= The Looming Tower (miniseries) =

2018 American drama TV miniseries

- Genre: Drama
- Created by: Dan Futterman; Alex Gibney; Lawrence Wright
- Based on: The Looming Tower by Lawrence Wright
- Starring: Jeff Daniels; Tahar Rahim; Wrenn Schmidt; Bill Camp; Louis Cancelmi; Virginia Kull; Ella Rae Peck; Sullivan Jones; Michael Stuhlbarg; Peter Sarsgaard
- Composer: Will Bates
- Country of origin: United States
- Original language: English
- No. of episodes: 10

Production
- Executive producers: Dan Futterman; Alex Gibney; Lawrence Wright; Craig Zisk; Adam Rapp
- Producers: Ali Soufan; Peter Feldman; Lauren Whitney
- Production locations: New York City; Johannesburg; Morocco
- Cinematography: Jim Denault; Frederick Elmes; Ivan Strasburg
- Editors: Daniel A. Valverde; Meg Reticker; Joe Hobeck
- Running time: 46–51 minutes
- Production companies: Wolf Moon Productions; South Slope Pictures; Jigsaw Productions; Legendary Television

Original release
- Network: Hulu
- Release: February 28 – April 18, 2018

The Looming Tower is an American drama television miniseries, based on Lawrence Wright's 2006 book of the same name, which premiered on Hulu on February 28, 2018. The 10-episode drama series was created and executive produced by Dan Futterman, Alex Gibney, and Wright. Futterman also acted as the series's showrunner and Gibney directed the first episode. The series stars an ensemble cast featuring Jeff Daniels, Tahar Rahim, Wrenn Schmidt, Bill Camp, Louis Cancelmi, Virginia Kull, Ella Rae Peck, Sullivan Jones, Michael Stuhlbarg, and Peter Sarsgaard.

== Premise ==
The Looming Tower traces the "rising threat of Osama bin Laden and al-Qaeda in the late 1990s and how the rivalry between the FBI and CIA during that time may have inadvertently contributed to the 9/11 attacks. It follows members of the I-49 Squad in New York and Alec Station in Washington, D.C., the counter-terrorism divisions of the FBI and CIA, respectively, as they travel the world fighting for ownership of information while seemingly working toward the same goal – trying to prevent an imminent attack on U.S. soil."

== Cast and characters ==
=== Main ===
- Jeff Daniels as John O'Neill, the chief of the New York FBI's Counterterrorism Center known as "I-49". He is convinced that the United States has been targeted for attack by al-Qaeda but is faced with hostility from other federal agencies, particularly the CIA.
- Tahar Rahim as Ali Soufan, a Muslim Lebanese-American FBI agent on John O'Neill's I-49 counterterrorism squad who eventually becomes his protégé. Soufan is infuriated by the perversion of Islam by enemies of the United States and goes so far as to go undercover in terrorists' gathering spaces in order to hunt al-Qaeda and prevent attacks.
- Wrenn Schmidt as Diane Marsh, a CIA analyst who works under Martin Schmidt. Similar to Schmidt, she believes the CIA is uniquely positioned to combat terrorist attacks and therefore decides to conceal information from the FBI. Marsh is a composite character of at least three people within the CIA, including Alfreda Frances Bikowsky.
- Bill Camp as Robert Chesney, an FBI veteran in New York's counterterrorism unit. About to retire, he uses his interrogation skills to extract important intelligence from suspects in the struggle against terrorist threats. Chesney has been described as the most composited of all the main characters; Soufan commented that Chesney is a composite of "at least four people."
- Louis Cancelmi as Vince Stuart, an FBI agent embedded into CIA's Alec Station. His assignment is to ensure that the FBI receives all the same intelligence the CIA does. His presence at the CIA is met with severe distrust. The character is based on FBI agent Mark Rossini.
- Virginia Kull as Kathy Shaughnessy, an FBI agent in the I-49 counterterrorism squad who works closely with Floyd Bennet.
- Ella Rae Peck as Heather, a special education teacher, originally from Ohio, who begins to see Soufan. Their dates are constantly interrupted by his work for the FBI, and she finds the secretive and dangerous nature of his job a difficult obstacle to overcome in their relationship.
- Sullivan Jones as Floyd Bennet, an FBI agent in the I-49 counterterrorism squad who works closely with Kathy Shaughnessy. He is a former member of the New York State Police SWAT Team.
- Michael Stuhlbarg as Richard Clarke, the National Coordinator for Security, Infrastructure Protection, and Counterterrorism and the chief counterterrorism adviser on the United States National Security Council.
- Peter Sarsgaard as Martin Schmidt, the chief of "Alec Station", a section of the CIA Counterterrorism Center. Schmidt butts heads with O'Neill after deciding to withhold information from him, believing that the CIA is the only agency prepared to combat potential terrorist threats. The character is based on former CIA Officer Michael Scheuer.

=== Recurring ===
- Jenny Paul as Maureen, a CIA analyst working in Alec Station.
- Erica Cho as Leigh, a CIA analyst working in Alec Station.
- Sharon Washington as Judith, a CIA analyst working in Alec Station.
- Katie Flahive as Amy, a CIA analyst working in Alec Station.
- Jamie Neumann as Toni-Ann Marino, an FBI agent in O'Neill's I-49 counterterrorism squad who is embedded into the CIA's Alec Station, alongside Vince Stuart.
- Tawfeek Barhom as Khalid al-Mihdhar, one of five hijackers of American Airlines Flight 77, which crashed into the Pentagon as part of the September 11 attacks.
- Samer Bisharat as Walid bin Attash, also known as Khallad, a Yemeni terrorist who helped in the preparation of the 1998 East Africa Embassy bombings and the USS Cole bombing, and acted as a bodyguard to Osama bin Laden.
- Annie Parisse as Liz, an English professor with whom O'Neill is having an affair in New York.
- Nasser Faris as Ayman al-Zawahiri, one of the co-founders of al-Qaeda.
- Michael Quinlan as General O'Keefe.
- Ken Arnold as General Stetson.
- Jordan Lage as Mr. Kearns, one of ten commissioners overseeing the 9/11 Commission in 2002.
- Kimberly S. Fairbanks as Ms. McCabe, one of ten commissioners overseeing the 9/11 Commission in 2002.
- July Namir as Hoda Hada, the wife of Khalid al-Mihdhar.
- Ibrahim Renno as Khalid Sheikh Mohammed, the leader of al-Qaeda's propaganda operations and the principal architect of the 9/11 attacks.
- Nebras Jamali as Nawaf al-Hazmi, one of five hijackers of American Airlines Flight 77, which crashed into the Pentagon as part of the September 11 attacks.
- Craig Wroe as Leonard Bliss, the CIA chief of the Near East Division, and Schmidt and Marsh's superior.
- Jill Dalton as Beverly.
- Alec Baldwin as George Tenet, the CIA Director.
- Yul Vazquez as Jason Sanchez, the assistant director of the FBI in the New York office and O'Neill's superior.
- Youssef Berouain as Mohamad al-Owhali, an al-Qaeda member who took part in the 1998 United States embassy bombings.
- Katie Finneran as Sheri, a woman with whom O'Neill is having an affair in Washington, D.C.
- Mohamad Ashraf as Walla.
- Ayman Samman as Anas al-Liby, a computer specialist for al-Qaeda who takes part in the 1998 United States embassy bombings.
- Zaki Youssef as Abu Jandal, a Yemeni member of al-Qaeda in Afghanistan.
- Tasha Lawrence as Maria O'Neill, John's wife and the mother of his two daughters.
- Ashley Leyva as Willa O'Neill, John's daughter.
- Angelina Leyva as Celia O'Neill, John's daughter.
- Jennifer Ehle as Barbara Bodine, U.S. ambassador to Yemen. She comes to dislike O'Neill, reports him to his superiors at the FBI, and has him expelled from Yemen.
- Dhaffer L'Abidine as Mohamed Atta, an Egyptian hijacker and one of the ringleaders of the September 11 attacks. He served as the hijacker-pilot of American Airlines Flight 11 and crashed the plane into the North Tower of the World Trade Center as part of the coordinated attacks.
- Joe Corrigall as John Chihoyne, a CIA agent stationed in Yemen.
- Eisa Davis as Condoleezza Rice, U.S. National Security Advisor to President George W. Bush.
- Ali Suliman as General Qamish, a Yemeni general who aids O'Neill and Soufan's investigation into the USS Cole bombing in Yemen.
- Sami Karim as Omar al-Bayoumi, an agent of the Saudi government who befriends al-Hazmi and al-Mihdhar.

=== Guest ===
- C. J. Wilson as John Miller, a reporter for ABC News who conducts an interview with Osama bin Laden in the Hindu Kush of Afghanistan.
- Vincent Ebrahim as Wadih el-Hage, an al-Qaeda member who acted as secretary for Osama bin Laden and who took part in the 1998 United States embassy bombings.
- Wendy Mae Brown as April Brightsky Ray, the wife of Wadih el-Hage.
- Eugene Wanangwa Khumbanyiwa as Trenton Okuru, a security guard at the American Embassy in Nairobi and witness as well as survivor to the Embassy bombing.
- Jennifer Dundas as Mary Jo White, the United States Attorney for the Southern District of New York.
- Barbara Rosenblat as Elaine Kaufman, the owner of the Manhattan restaurant Elaine's, where O'Neill frequently eats.
- Tony Curran as Barry James, an inspector in the Metropolitan Police Service at Scotland Yard in London, England.
- Osh Ghanimah as Abu Hamsa al-Masri.
- Nayef Rashed as Ahmed al-Hada, an al-Qaeda operative who acted as their "switchboard" host.
- Robert Vincent Smith as Cardinal James Hickey, an American Cardinal of the Roman Catholic Church and the Archbishop of Washington, D.C. He performed John and Maria O'Neill's marriage ceremony and John goes to see him about getting it annulled.
- Nezar Alderazi as Jamal Ahmad Mohammad Al Badawi, a Yemeni who helps plan the attack on the USS Cole.
- Bijan Daneshmand as Farouq Osman.
- Donald Sage Mackay as Commander Kirk Lippold, the Commanding Officer of the USS Cole.
- Stewart Steinberg as Larry Silverstein, the founder of Silverstein Properties that has leased the World Trade Center from the Port Authority. He hires O'Neill as head of security at the World Trade Center following his retirement from the FBI.

== Episodes ==
No.	Title	Directed by	Written by	Original release date
1	"Now It Begins..."	Alex Gibney	Story by : Dan Futterman & Alex Gibney & Lawrence Wright; Teleplay by : Dan Futterman	February 28, 2018
In August 1998, FBI agent Ali Soufan is asked to join John O'Neill's counterterrorism unit known as "I-49". As the squad fights to get information out of the CIA, the American embassies in Kenya and Tanzania are bombed.
2	"Losing My Religion"	John Dahl	Story by : Dan Futterman & Alex Gibney & Lawrence Wright; Teleplay by : Dan Futterman	February 28, 2018
Following the concurrent embassy bombings in Kenya and Tanzania, the FBI begins to investigate in Africa, while the CIA begins to devise a plan to strike back.
3	"Mistakes Were Made"	John Dahl	Bash Doran	February 28, 2018
Shaughnessy and Bennett capture Mohamad al-Owhali, who confesses to bombing the U.S. embassy in Nairobi after being interrogated by Chesney. O'Neill and Soufan search the home of a second suspect, Anas al-Liby, but do not have enough evidence to hold him. Stuart's minimal clearance at the CIA prevents them from building a stronger case. Schmidt convinces the President to retaliate by bombing an al-Qaeda training camp in Khost, Afghanistan.
4	"Mercury"	Ali Selim	Adam Rapp	March 7, 2018
I-49 obtains the phone number of Ahmed al-Hada, but their tap on the phone is taken over by the CIA. Alec Station learns of the Kuala Lumpur al-Qaeda Summit from this, but Schmidt clashes with his superiors over their reluctance to commit to further airstrikes. Schmidt is demoted leaving Marsh in charge of Alec Station.
5	"Y2K"	Ali Selim	Shannon Houston	March 14, 2018
Events continue through New Year's Eve and the transition past a potential coordinated terrorist attack to coincide with Year 2000 problem ("Y2K").
6	"Boys at War"	Michael Slovis	Dan Futterman	March 21, 2018
In Afghanistan, al-Zawahiri recruits Mohamed Atta to lead a hijacking on US soil. He also sends a young boy, who is a survivor of Operation Infinite Reach, to meet with two associates in Yemen. The three of them carry out the USS Cole bombing. O'Neill has his briefcase stolen while attending a mandatory retirement seminar in Florida and confesses the potential security breach to the bureau.
7	"The General"	Michael Slovis	Ali Selim	March 28, 2018
O'Neill and Soufan travel to Yemen to investigate the bombing of Cole and are able to implicate Tawfiq bin Attash, one of the architects of the Malaysia meeting. Marsh refuses to reveal Attash's last known whereabouts when Marino asks her. She hides the surveillance photos of al-Mihdhar and al-Hazmi, fearing their eventual discovery by the FBI.
8	"A Very Special Relationship"	Craig Zisk	Bash Doran	April 4, 2018
The FBI has O'Neill removed from Yemen at the request of Ambassador Bodine. Soufan stays behind and learns about the link to Malaysia. After several co-workers confront her, Marsh agrees to start sharing intelligence if the FBI can prove that it already knows enough to identify al-Mihdhar and al-Hazmi. Sanchez learns of an upcoming New York Times story about a stolen briefcase containing classified documents and fires O'Neill to save face.
9	"Tuesday"	Craig Zisk	Adam Rapp	April 11, 2018
After learning that a man has been flagged for ignoring the landing component of a flying lesson, I-49 requests a list of Arabs enrolled in American flight schools who have other aggravating factors. Marsh complies but obfuscates the fact that two of the men in her file are known al-Qaeda operatives. O'Neill starts working at the World Trade Center, while Atta's al-Qaeda cell decides to finalize its plans.
10	"9/11"	Craig Zisk	Dan Futterman & Ali Selim	April 18, 2018
Following the terrorist attacks on September 11, various members of O'Neill's squad try to get in contact with him. Meanwhile, Schmidt is reassigned back into his old position at Alec Station, and Soufan is finally given access to Abu Jandal and begins to interrogate him to confirm that al-Qaeda was behind the attacks. During the 9/11 Commission hearings, Marsh lies in her testimony regarding the handling of the Hazmi and Mihdhar files to save her own face.

== Production ==
=== Development ===
The project emanated from Ali Soufan and Lawrence Wright's realization that both of them were fielding offers from various studios and production companies regarding the rights to their books about the lead-up to the September 11 terrorist attacks. The pair met with filmmaker Alex Gibney, who had already adapted Wright's one-man show, My Trip to Al-Qaeda and book Going Clear for HBO. Wright said about the collaborations with Gibney, "He's a documentarian, and he understands the importance of truth. We've been in the trenches. I came to trust him, and that's what I wanted — someone I felt could handle and negotiate these really difficult moral questions." Following that partnership, the team began to interview potential showrunners. They soon landed on screenwriter Dan Futterman after one meeting, and then decided to work on their pitch for the series. After refining their pitch, they approached HBO, Netflix and Amazon with the project. As a courtesy, they also reached out to Hulu without really placing them into consideration due to the perception of the streaming service as merely a place to stream episodes of network television shows. However, during their meeting with Hulu they were offered a straight-to-series order, an abbreviated development process, a promise not to cave under pressure from the federal agencies portrayed in the series, and the largest financial commitment of any service or network they had previously met with. It was due to these terms and conditions that the producers ultimately decided to sign with the company.

During pre-production, producers spent months doing exhaustive homework. This involved interviewing the real-life counterparts of the characters they were bringing to life, including Ali Soufan and his wife; former National Security Council chief counterterrorism adviser Richard Clarke; former and current members of the FBI's I-49 squad; and former members of the CIA. Futterman has mentioned that in addition to adapting Wright's book, the series also drew from Soufan's book The Black Banners: The Inside Story of 9/11 and the War Against al-Qaeda and the 9/11 Commission Report.

In September 2016, Hulu ordered The Looming Tower to series from Legendary Television with executive producers including Alex Gibney, Dan Futterman, and Lawrence Wright. It was announced that the limited series would consist of ten episodes and premiere in 2017. It was later reported that Craig Zisk was also an executive producer for the series and would be directing as well. Ultimately, five different directors were chosen to helm the series' ten episodes: Zisk, Michael Slovis, John Dahl, Ali Selim and Alex Gibney. The show's first episode was directed by Gibney, episodes six and seven were directed by Slovis, and episodes eight, nine, and ten were directed by Zisk. The series' story requires multiple international locations with the first five episodes having scenes that are set in seven countries and ten cities. Early on in the development process, Zisk and Gibney went on several international location scouting missions, in order to give their fellow directors options to pick from for filming.

=== Casting ===
In January 2017, it was announced that Tahar Rahim was cast in one of the series' lead roles as Ali Soufan. In February 2017, Michael Stuhlbarg and Bill Camp were announced as series regulars and cast as Richard Clarke and Robert Chesney, respectively. In March 2017, Jeff Daniels was cast as John O'Neill. Also announced that month were the castings of Sullivan Jones, Virginia Kull, Louis Cancelmi, Peter Sarsgaard, and Wrenn Schmidt and Ella Rae Peck as series regulars. In May 2017, Alec Baldwin was cast as George Tenet in a guest role.

After being cast as the late O'Neill, Jeff Daniels struggled on how to approach playing the role. He ultimately credits significant research he did involving speaking with those who knew O'Neill. At one point, he spent an evening at a bar in Lower Manhattan with ten of O'Neill's colleagues, who'd worked with him for years. He commented, "I had a great meeting with those guys, walked out to the corner, turned to get a cab and there's the World Trade Center. To feel him, you need the spirit of what John is fighting for."

=== Filming ===
The series began filming on May 3, 2017 in New York City and it was expected that shooting would take place in a number of locations around the world. Ultimately, the production lasted six months and sprawled across three continents and six countries. Various places stood-in for the locales in which the story actually took place. For instance, scenes set in Yemen were filmed in Morocco, and drone and car travel shots of Pakistani landscapes were used to evoke Afghanistan. Johannesburg, South Africa served as the production base, and was where the bulk of filming took place. The city possessed the "visual variety" that the producers were seeking, and doubled for various places including Nairobi, Tanzania, England, Albania, and Las Vegas, Nevada. While there was an initial push to shoot the production all in South Africa, Zisk argued for filming the back half in Morocco. In August 2017, filming took place at the River Café in Brooklyn.

Production designer Lester Cohen credits Wright's and Gibney's list of contacts and the production's research team for allowing him to gather the material needed to recreate various settings. During the design period, a set dresser shared photos of his tour in Afghanistan and an art coordinator's daughter dove into the newspaper archives in Nairobi to help re-create the bombing site of the 1998 embassy attacks. Those details informed the design of the huge rubble pile that shut down the central business district in Cape Town for weeks. Also, as much of the story that takes place in the United States occurs in offices, practical sets were built, including Alec Station and the FBI office in New York.

== Release ==
The Looming Tower posters

Teaser poster

Official poster

=== Marketing ===
On December 19, 2017, Hulu released the first preview of the series through a collection of images and a "first-look" video featuring interviews with the cast and crew. On January 11, 2018, Hulu released the first official trailer for the series.

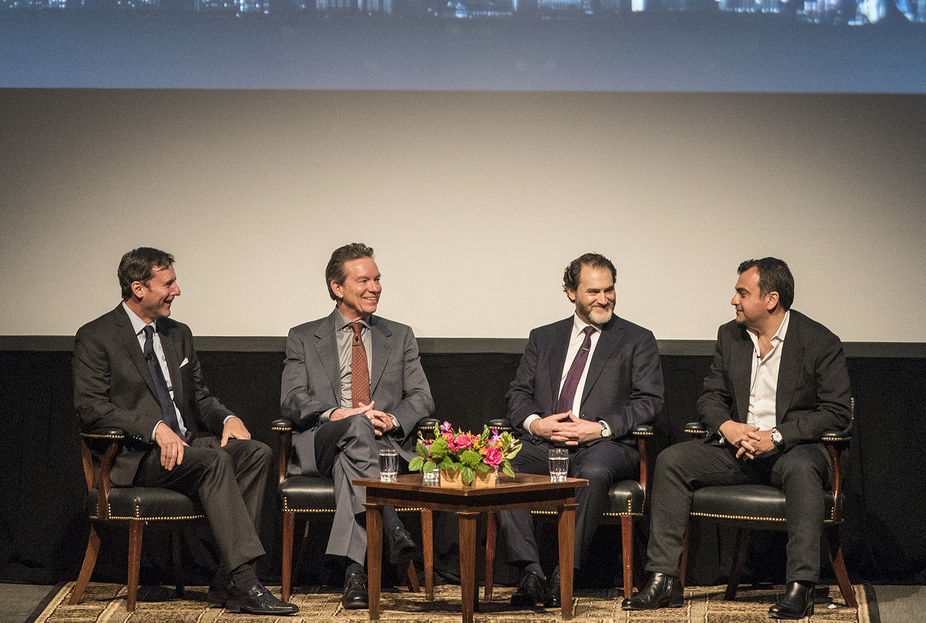
(L–R) Mark Updegrove, Lawrence Wright, Michael Stuhlbarg and Ali Soufan following a screening at the LBJ Presidential Library.

=== Premiere ===
On February 13, 2018, The Washington Post held a screening of the first episode. Following the screening, journalist David Ignatius moderated a question-and-answer session with Jeff Daniels, Tahar Rahim, Peter Sarsgaard, Wrenn Schmidt, Dan Futterman, Alex Gibney, Lawrence Wright, and Ali Soufan.

On February 15, 2018, the series had its official premiere at The Paris Theatre in New York City. On February 20, 2018, the series held its international premiere during the annual Berlin International Film Festival at the Zoo Palast cinema in Berlin.

On February 27, 2018, the LBJ Presidential Library held a screening of the first episode. Following the screening, LBJ Foundation president Mark K. Updegrove moderated a question-and-answer session with Lawrence Wright, Michael Stuhlbarg, and Ali Soufan. On May 1, 2018, episodes 1 and 2 were screened during the Series Mania Festival at the Le Majestic cinema in Lille, France. It appeared alongside seven other television programs in the festival's "Best of USA" series of shows.

=== Distribution ===
In all regions outside the United States, the series is distributed by Amazon Video. The series premiered on March 1, 2018, in the United Kingdom and subsequent episodes were released weekly for the following seven weeks, The series began airing weekly on April 26, 2019, on BBC Two, with catch-up availability on iPlayer. In Germany and Austria, the series premiered on March 9, 2018.

=== Home media ===
The Looming Tower was released on Blu-ray and DVD on September 18, 2018. The set includes four behind-the-scenes featurettes and audio commentaries on the premiere and finale episodes.

== Reception ==
=== Critical response ===
The Looming Tower was met with a positive response from critics. On the review aggregation website Rotten Tomatoes, the series holds an 88% approval rating with an average rating of 7.4 out of 10 based on 60 reviews. The website's critical consensus reads, "Well-acted and powerfully written, The Looming Tower delivers gripping counter-terrorism drama rendered even more soberingly effective through its roots in real-life events." Metacritic, which uses a weighted average, assigned the series a score of 74 out of 100 based on 25 critics, indicating "generally favorable reviews".

The Washington Post's Hank Stuever praised the series for its "coolly fascinating pace and tenor" and commented that "Tahar Rahim gives a smart and sincere performance as Ali Soufan, a Muslim American agent on O'Neill's squad." The Hollywood Reporter's Daniel Fienberg offered the series praise saying, "The Looming Tower demands a hasty combination of faith in the storytellers and half-forgotten knowledge of the history. Absent that, the series is essentially like a well-shot, brilliantly cast, fast-moving season of Homeland, which is better than the actual current season of Homeland." In a positive review, Variety's Maureen Ryan said that the show was an "accessible, illuminating series that does not downplay the petty and tragic elements of the tale." Time's Daniel D'Addario commended the show as "a series that's both gripping and relevant. It succeeds, with a project that restages the years before Sept. 11 and tells a darkly ironic story about the fecklessness of government." In a more negative review, Collider's Chris Cabin criticized the series calling it "a middling act of didacticism, an attempt to pass off facts as insight and characters as little more than the sum of their intellect. Rather than tracing the complicated personalities and ludicrous dick-measuring contests that led to Al-Qaeda carrying out the biggest terrorist attack in American history, Gibney, Wright, and the rest of the creative team boil down the personal drama to little more than a series of arguments and discussions in offices at varying volumes."

=== Awards and nominations ===
Award	Category	Nominee(s)	Result	Ref.
70th Primetime Emmy Awards	Outstanding Lead Actor in a Limited Series or Movie	Jeff Daniels	Nominated	
70th Primetime Emmy Awards	Outstanding Supporting Actor in a Limited Series or Movie	Michael Stuhlbarg	Nominated	
70th Primetime Emmy Awards	Outstanding Directing for a Limited Series, Movie or Dramatic Special	Craig Zisk (for "9/11")	Nominated	
70th Primetime Creative Arts Emmy Awards	Outstanding Casting for a Limited Series, Movie or Special	Avy Kaufman, Leo Davis, Lissy Holm, & Moonyeenn Lee	Nominated	
24th Critics' Choice Awards	Best Actor in a Limited Series or Movie Made for Television	Peter Sarsgaard	Nominated	
34th Artios Awards	Outstanding Achievement in Casting – Television Pilot and First Season – Drama	Avy Kaufman	Nominated	
71st Writers Guild of America Awards	Television: Long Form – Adapted	Bash Doran, Dan Futterman, Alex Gibney, Shannon Houston, Adam Rapp, Ali Selim, & Lawrence Wright	Nominated	
23rd Satellite Awards	Best Miniseries	The Looming Tower	Nominated	
23rd Satellite Awards	Best Actor – Miniseries or Television Film	Jeff Daniels	Nominated	

== Potential sequel ==
It has been reported that if the limited series is sufficiently successful, a sequel series could possibly be ordered. Early discussions among the producers have begun; their concept revolves around the birth of the Muslim Brotherhood.

== See also ==
- List of original programs distributed by Hulu
