= Alfreda Frances Bikowsky =

American CIA officer and counterterrorism analyst (born 1965)

- Born: 1965 (age 60–61)
- Occupations: Intelligence officer, life coach, businesswoman
- Spouse: Michael Scheuer (m. 2014)

Alfreda Frances Bikowsky (born 1965) is a former Central Intelligence Agency (CIA) officer who headed the Bin Laden Issue Station and the Global Jihad unit. Bikowsky's identity is not publicly acknowledged by the CIA, but was deduced by independent investigative journalists in 2011. In January 2014, the Washington Post named her and tied her to a pre-9/11 intelligence failure and the extraordinary rendition of Khalid El-Masri. Bikowsky is widely believed to be one of the CIA officers, if not the central one, on whom the character of the protagonist in the film Zero Dark Thirty is based. The Senate Intelligence Committee report on CIA torture, released in December 2014, showed that Bikowsky was not only a key part of the torture program but also one of its chief apologists, resulting in the media's giving her the moniker "The Unidentified Queen of Torture."

== CIA career ==
Bikowsky started her CIA career in the 1990s as a Soviet analyst. She was brought into the Bin Laden Issue Station when it was created in 1996 by its first chief, Michael Scheuer. Sometime after the USS Cole bombing in October 2000, she was promoted to Deputy Chief of the Bin Laden Issue Station. By March 2003, she had been appointed Chief of the station. The station was closed in late 2005.

Journalist Ken Silverstein reported that Bikowsky was a top candidate to be CIA Deputy Chief of Station in Baghdad in 2007. However, a CIA spokesman later wrote to Silverstein to say Bikowsky was not considered for the position and to dispute the characterization of her in the post.

In 2008, Jane Mayer reported that Bikowsky held "a top post handling sensitive matters in the Middle East." It was reported in 2011 that Bikowsky had been promoted to the head of the CIA's Global Jihad unit. She was characterized as a "top CIA official," equivalent to a general in the military.

According to the Senate Intelligence Committee report on CIA torture, Bikowsky was at the center of the CIA's effort to justify its use of "enhanced interrogation" techniques. She testified to the Senate Intelligence Committee in February 2007 that enhanced interrogation saved at least hundreds of American lives. The report listed three other claims Bikowsky made in that hearing, calling them all inaccurate. Bikowsky's pseudonym was redacted at least three dozen times in the report.

=== Blocking intelligence sharing before September 11, 2001 ===
Bikowsky was a senior staff member at the Bin Laden Issue Station in January 2000. She was the direct supervisor of Michael Anne Casey, a CIA staff operations officer who was assigned to track future 9/11 hijacker Khalid al-Mihdhar at an al-Qaeda operatives' meeting in Malaysia in early January 2000. Casey blocked a draft cable written by Doug Miller, an FBI agent detailed to the Bin Laden Issue Station, to the FBI warning that al-Mihdhar had a multiple-entry visa for travel to the U.S. Mark Rossini, another FBI agent first assigned to the Bin Laden Issue Station in 1999, testified that Casey also verbally ordered him to not share information with FBI headquarters about al-Mihdhar or Nawaf al-Hazmi, who was traveling with al-Mihdhar. Rossini further stated that Bikowsky told congressional investigators in 2002 that she hand-delivered al-Mihdhar's visa information to FBI headquarters. This was later proven false by FBI log books. The CIA shared some details about al-Mihdhar with the FBI at that time, but not that he had a valid visa to enter the U.S.

=== Rendition of Maher Arar ===
Former CIA officer John Kiriakou was interviewed about the arrest and extraordinary rendition of an innocent Canadian citizen Maher Arar, which occurred in September 2002 at John F. Kennedy International Airport. Kiriakou objected directly to a "senior female CIA counter-terrorism officer" (presumably Bikowsky), who did not know Arabic, after realizing that she confused Arar with another known Al-Qaeda operative whose name sounded similar in English but was completely different in Arabic. Kiriakou said that she overruled his objections and ordered the rendition anyway. Arar was sent to Syria, where he was tortured and held for almost one year. In reference to the episode, he referred to the film Zero Dark Thirty.

=== Interrogation of Khalid Sheikh Mohammed ===
Bikowsky has been identified as "the redheaded former Soviet analyst who had been in the Bin Laden Unit during Michael Scheuer's supervision" in Jane Mayer's book, The Dark Side. After Khalid Sheikh Mohammed was captured in March 2003, Mayer writes of Bikowsky:

Despite the CIA's insistence on the professionalism of its interrogation program, according to two well-informed Agency sources, one particularly overzealous female officer had to be reprimanded for her role. After Mohammed was captured, the woman, who headed the Al Qaeda unit in the CTC, was so excited she flew at government expense to the black site where Mohammed was held so that she could personally watch him being waterboarded. ... Coworkers said she had no legitimate reason to be present during Mohammed's interrogation. She was not an interrogator. "She thought it would be cool to be in the room," a former colleague said. (p. 273)

The Senate torture report claims Bikowsky participated in the interrogation and that claims she made about the results were "almost entirely inaccurate."

=== Rendition of Khalid El-Masri ===
In late January 2004, Bikowsky, as head of the Bin Laden Issue Station, made the decision to extraordinarily render Khalid El-Masri to Afghanistan for four months without any evidence in hand. El-Masri's name was a different transliteration of Khalid al-Masri, the name of a person who had supposedly met Ramzi bin al-Shibh and Marwan al-Shehhi on a train in Germany. Even after El-Masri's passport was checked and his identity as a different person was confirmed in March, Bikowsky still wanted him held in detention in Afghanistan. El-Masri was eventually released in late May on a country road in Albania. The CIA Inspector General determined that there was no legal justification for rendering El-Masri. Bikowsky received no reprimand for the incident, because then-CIA Director Michael Hayden said he didn't want to deter the initiative of counter-terrorism employees.

In 2015, the European Center for Constitutional and Human Rights, a German non-profit human rights organization, filed a criminal complaint in Germany asking for a federal criminal investigation of Bikowsky for the rendition and torture of El-Masri. Germany's Code of Crimes against International Law does not require the accused to be in Germany or the crime to have been committed there. The complaint cited the U.S. Senate Intelligence Committee report on torture as proof of Bikowsky's involvement.

== Who is Rich Blee? ==
In 2011, independent journalists Ray Nowosielski and John Duffy planned to release an audio documentary entitled Who is Rich Blee? The documentary focused on the CIA's Bin Laden Issue Station before 9/11 and how certain CIA officials blocked information on future 9/11 hijackers from reaching the FBI. They planned to be the first to reveal the identity of two CIA officers, including Bikowsky, who had previously only been identified as "Frances" in an AP news story from 2011 or as a red-headed CIA agent in Jane Mayer's The Dark Side. However, after receiving threats of prosecution from the CIA under the Intelligence Identities Protection Act, Duffy and Nowosielski decided to release the documentary with the names redacted. They claim that their webmaster later posted an email containing the identities by accident. The identities then spread to the wider Internet.

== Representations ==
Bikowsky's career and personality were the main models for the character Maya (portrayed by actress Jessica Chastain) in the film Zero Dark Thirty (2012), although Maya is a composite character of several women involved in finding Osama bin Laden. The film attracted controversy for its depiction of the use of torture to elicit information from terrorist suspects.

She is represented by the Corrine Whitman character in the film Rendition (2007), which is based on the true story of the Khalid El-Masri rendition.

She is also a basis for the character Diane Marsh (portrayed by Wrenn Schmidt) in the Hulu miniseries The Looming Tower (2018). In the dramatization, she is depicted as being one of the two people primarily responsible for the lack of intelligence sharing between the FBI and CIA in the lead up to 9/11.

In The Report, a film adaptation of the Senate Intelligence Committee report on CIA torture, a character played by Maura Tierney appears to be based on Bikowsky.

== Personal life ==
Bikowsky married Michael Scheuer in 2014. He was a fellow CIA employee and former Chief of the Bin Laden Issue Station. Under a variation of her married name, Freda Scheuer, she owns and operates her own business, YBeU Beauty, alternatively called YBeU Life Coaching for Women. As a life coach she "helps women look good, feel good, and do good."

== See also ==
- Bin Laden Issue Station
- Enhanced interrogation techniques
- Senate Intelligence Committee report on CIA torture
