= Abdussattar Shaikh =

FBI informant

Abdussattar Shaikh AKA Dr. Abdussattar “Sattar” Shaikh
- Born: India
- Occupations: San Diego, California-based FBI informant from 1994 to 2003
- Known for: Befriending 2 terrorists who commandeered planes in 9/11 attacks

Abdussattar Shaikh (ar عبد الستار شيخ) is a former FBI informant who was an asset of the FBI’s San Diego Field Office from May 14, 1994, to July 2003. He was called "The FBI's Best Chance to Uncover September 11th Before it Happened" by the Joint Inquiry into Intelligence Community Activities before and after the Terrorist Attacks of September 11, 2001.

== Role in 9/11 ==
In 2000, two of the hijackers in the September 11 attacks, Nawaf al-Hazmi and Khalid al-Mihdhar, rented a room in Shaikh's home in Lemon Grove, California. However, Shaikh did not provide his FBI contact Steven Butler with any information about the two; Butler claims that the names Nawaf and Khalid were only mentioned in casual conversation as two students who were boarders in his house. Butler later asked Shaikh for their surnames, but was not given them. He was not told they were pursuing flight training. He was told that the students were non-political and had done nothing to arouse suspicion. The CIA did not provide the terrorists' names to the FBI, which could have prevented 9-11.

"They were nice, but not what you call extroverted people" Shaikh told The San Diego Union-Tribune after the attacks. Still, he told reporters he bonded with Alhazmi, helping him open a bank account and place a personal ad on the World Wide Web. "He told me that he wanted to marry a Mexican girl," Shaikh told the Los Angeles Times. "The problem was that he didn't know any Spanish. So I taught him a few Spanish phrases."

Shaikh was described as an educator at academies for teaching English to foreigners before he retired, and Vice President for International Projects at American Commonwealth University (ACU).

== Citizens Review Board on Police Practices ==
Shaikh sat on San Diego's Citizens Review Board on Police Practices (CRBPP) during the time frame of his cooperation with the FBI. Ethical questions arose about his qualifications, as active police informants are precluded from employment on police oversight committees. Shaikh was later removed from the board.
