= Mohamed Rashed Daoud Al-Owhali =

Saudi Arabian terrorist

- Born: 18 January 1977 (age 49); Liverpool, England
- Detained at: USP Big Sandy
- Other names: Mohammed Akbar, Abdul Jabbar Ali Abdel-Latif, Khalid Salim Saleh Bin Rashid
- Alleged to be a member of: Al-Qaeda
- Charge(s): Murder; Conspiracy to commit murder Conspiracy to use a weapon of mass destruction
- Penalty: Life imprisonment without parole

Mohamed Rashed Daoud Al-Owhali (born 18 January 1977) is a British-born Saudi terrorist. Al-Owhali is one of the four al-Qaeda members sentenced in 2001 to life without parole for their parts in the 1998 United States embassy bombings. The others are Mohammed Saddiq Odeh, Khalfan Khamis Mohamed, and Wadih el-Hage.

== Militant activity ==
A Saudi from a wealthy family, al-Owhali attended Khalden training camp in 1996. He traveled to Kenya on a false passport under the name of Khalid Salim Saleh Bin Rashid, which he later claimed was provided by "Bilal", which is an alias of Abd al-Rahim al-Nashiri.

During the Nairobi bombing, he had initially sat in the passenger seat of the Toyota Dyna, and threw a stun grenade at embassy guards before exiting the vehicle which the driver detonated. Osama bin Laden later offered the explanation that it had been his intention to leap out and shoot the guards to clear a path for the truck, but that he had left his pistol in the truck and subsequently ran off.

== Arrest and imprisonment ==
Kenyan doctors attending to al-Owhali were suspicious of his role in the event, and noted that his injuries showed he had his back to the explosion and suggested he may have been running from the scene.

He was arrested August 12, 1998, and confessed to his role in the bombing. He cooperated with the FBI willingly, and gave them the telephone number he had called before and following the bombing: 967–1–200578. It was a phone number to a house in Yemen belonging to Ahmad Mohammad Ali al-Hada, the father-in-law of Khalid al-Mihdhar, one of five hijackers of American Airlines Flight 77, which was flown into the Pentagon as part of the September 11 attacks. The house turned out to be the key communications hub for al-Qaeda. Through this number the CIA learned about the upcoming Kuala Lumpur al-Qaeda Summit where the plans for 9/11 and USS Cole bombing were finalized.

In a successful bid to escape the death penalty, Al-Owhali's lawyers used a video clip from Madeleine Albright and courtroom testimony from Ramsey Clark and Dennis Halliday, attesting to the negative impact of sanctions against Iraq in the 1990s, which encouraged al-Owhali to become a participant in terrorism against the United States.

Al-Owhali was convicted of murder and was sentenced to life imprisonment without the possibility of parole. Federal prosecutors had been seeking a death sentence, but he was spared execution after jurors failed to unanimously agree on a death sentence. As of 2026, Al-Owhali is serving his life sentence at USP Big Sandy in Martin County, Kentucky, USA. His inmate register number is 42371–054.

== Provided evidence against other captives in the war on terror ==
Two Summary of Evidence memos prepared for the Combatant Status Review Tribunals of the fourteen "high-value detainees" mentioned al-Owhali:

name	notes
Walid bin Attash	One of the allegations against Walid bin Attash was: Mohammad Rashed Daoud Al-Owhali (Al-Owhali) stated that in approximately June or July 1998, the detainee told him that his (Al-Owhali's) mission was a martyrdom mission, where he would be driving a vehicle filled with explosives into a target which would result in his death. The detainee told Al-Owhali the target was a United States embassy in East Africa, but he was not told the exact country.
Abd al-Rahim al-Nashiri	One of the allegations against al-Nashiri was: Mohammad Rashid Daoud Al-Owhali (Al-Owhali), confessed and was later convicted in the United States District Court, Southern District of New York, for his role in the al Qaida bombings of the United States embassies in East Africa, which occurred on 7 August 1998. Al-Owhali obtained a Yemeni passport in the name of Khalid Salim Saleh Bin Rashid. Al-Owhali identified the individual who facilitated Al-Owhali's obtaining a Yemeni passport as Bilal, Bilal is known to Federal Bureau of Investigation investigators as Abdul Rahim al Nashiri, the detainee. Al-Owhali used this same Yemeni passport to travel to Nairobi, Kenya, arriving on 2 August 1998.
