= Saleh Ibn Abdul Rahman Hussayen =

Saudi Arabian government official

Saleh Ibn Abdul Rahman Hussayen (Arabic: صالح ابن عبدالرحمن الحصيّن) is a prominent Saudi government official who fell under suspicion following the Sept 11th attacks when it was discovered that three of the hijackers, Hani Hanjour, Khalid Almihdhar, and Nawaf Alhazmi had checked into the Marriott Residence Inn in Herndon, Virginia, the same hotel he was staying at, the night before the attacks.

On September 19, 2001, once the ban on International flights had been lifted, he was allowed to leave the United States and return to Saudi Arabia. Five months later he joined the Saudi government as President of the Affairs of the Holy Mosques Masjid al-Haram (Grand Mosque) in Mecca and Al-Masjid al-Nabawi (Prophet's Mosque) in Medina.

His nephew, Sami Omar Al-Hussayen, who was a graduate student at the University of Idaho, was arrested on charges of visa fraud, and later conspiring to provide material support to terrorists. He was not found guilty on any of the charges, and was willingly deported back to Saudi Arabia.
