= Mustafa al-Ansari =

Saudi terrorist

Mustafa Abdulkader Aabed al-Ansari (Arabic: مصطفى عبدالقادر عابد الأنصاري, Muṣṭafa ‘Abd al-Qader ‘Abed al-Ānṣarī) was a Saudi national who organized and died in the 2004 Yanbu attack in Saudi Arabia. He was also the son-in-law of Yemeni al Qaeda operative Ahmad Mohammad Ali al-Hada. During the 1990s he fought in Chechnya, Afghanistan and Bosnia.

== February 12, 2002 Yemeni terror alert ==
On February 11, 2002, al-Ansari was named in a suspected Yemen plot, for which he was among 17 suspected terrorists added to the FBI's third major "wanted" list, the "Seeking Information" list.

By February 2003, the FBI removed 6 suspects already jailed rearranged its wanted lists. al-Ansari was one of the remaining eleven Yemen plot suspects. By 2006, al-Ansari had been archived and removed from the FBI's current main wanted page, and were no longer included in the official count of suspects.

Whether foiled, aborted, or merely incorrect specific intelligence, the February 12, 2002 attack never occurred. However, other attacks and plots in Yemen soon followed.

== 2004 Yanbu attack ==
Al-Ansari was killed together with the three other attackers during the 2004 Yanbu attack which he organized in Saudi Arabia on May 1, 2004.
