= Yazid Sufaat =

Malaysian terrorist

Yazid Sufaat (born 20 January 1964), also known as Yazud bin Sufaat or Yazid Shufaat, is a Malaysian member of the extremist Islamist terrorist organisation Jemaah Islamiyah from shortly after its foundation in 1993 until his arrest by Malaysian authorities in December 2001. His speciality had been to develop anthrax as a weapon of bio-terrorism on behalf of the terror group al-Qaeda. Released in 2008, he was again detained on terrorist charges in Malaysia in 2013.

== Biography ==
=== Early life ===
Sufaat was born in Johor Lama, Malaysia on 20 January 1964. In 1987, he graduated from California State University, Sacramento with a degree in biochemistry. He then served in the Malaysian army as a medical technician, rising to the rank of captain.

=== Terrorist career ===
Sufaat is now believed to be one of al-Qaeda's main anthrax researchers. In 1993 Sufaat set up a pathology laboratory called Green Laboratory Medicine, at which he subsequently tried to weaponise anthrax on behalf of al-Qaeda. From 5 to 8 January 2000, a major meeting of al-Qaeda and JI personnel was held in Kuala Lumpur; four of those who attended stayed with Sufaat at his home. He is also suspected of providing employment documents to Zacarias Moussaoui, and providing lodging for two of the 11 September hijackers, namely Khalid al-Midhar and Nawaf al-Hazmi.

From the 9/11 Commission report:

The al-Qaeda-JI partnership yielded a number of proposals that would marry al-Qaeda's financial and technical strengths with JI's access to materials and local operatives. Here, Hambali played the critical role of coordinator, as he distributed al-Qaeda funds earmarked for joint operations. In one especially notable example, Atef turned to Hambali when al-Qaeda needed a scientist to take over its biological weapons program. Hambali obliged by introducing a U.S.-educated JI member, Yazid Sufaat, to Ayman al-Zawahiri in Kandahar. In 2001, Sufaat would spend several months attempting to cultivate anthrax for al-Qaeda in a laboratory he helped set up near the Kandahar airport.

Sufaat, through his company Green Laboratory Medicine, acquired four tonnes of ammonium nitrate for JI/MILF bomb-maker Fathur Rahman al-Ghozi. The intended bombing spree in Singapore (see Singapore embassies attack plot) was averted by the arrests in Singapore on 9 December 2001 and the capture of al-Ghozi in the Philippines the following month.

At the time of the 9/11 attacks, Sufaat was still in Afghanistan whence he fled via Pakistan to Malaysia where he was soon apprehended. He is still wanted by the United States in connection with 9/11.

His assets, under the name of Yazud bin Sufaat, were frozen on 5 September 2003 by the US Treasury's Office of Foreign Assets Control. Four days later, under the name Yazid Sufaat, he was embargoed by the United Nations Security Council Committee 1267 as an affiliate of al-Qaeda and the Taliban. His expired Malaysian passport carries number A10472263. As of April 2007 he was being held in the Kamuting prison under Malaysia's Internal Security Act (ISA), but he was released with no advanced notification by the Malaysian Government on 10 December 2008 with the Home Minister claiming that he was "sufficiently reformed". In early 2013, Sufaat was detained for a second time in Malaysia under the Security Offences (Special Measures) Act, the successor legislation for the ISA, for the recruitment of new members for the Islamic State in Iraq and the Levant. He was then sentenced for 4 years in prison where he was imprisoned at Tapah Prison.

In December 2017, he was re-arrested under the Prevention of Terrorism Act 2015 (POTA) after the Malaysian authorities found that he had been recruiting fellow inmates for al-Qaeda while he was in prison. As the allowed for the detention of a suspect without trial for two years, he was then released from the Simpang Renggam detention Centre on 19 November 2019. His release was decided by the Prevention of Terrorism Board and he was required to wear an electronic monitoring device and placed under house arrest.

Yazid was also required to be within the Bandar Ampang area in Hulu Langat and he was required to report at the Ampang police station twice a week, and he could only leave the designated area with a written permission from the Selangor police chief.
