= Walid bin Attash =

Yemeni Guantanamo Bay detainee (born 1978)

Walid bin Attash وليد بن عطاش
- Bin Attash in Guantanamo, 2021
- Born: Walid Muhammad Salih bin Mubarak bin Attash; 1978 (age 47–48); Azzan, Yemen
- Detained at: CIA black sites, Guantanamo
- Other names: Tawfiq bin Attash; Khallad; Silver
- ISN: 10014
- Charge: Charged before a military commission

Walid Muhammad Salih bin Mubarak bin Attash (Arabic: وليد محمد صالح بن مبارك بن عتش; born 1978) is a Yemeni prisoner held at the United States' Guantanamo Bay detention camp under terrorism-related charges and is suspected of playing a key role in the early stages of the 9/11 attacks. The Office of the Director of National Intelligence has described him as a "scion of a terrorist family". American prosecutors at the Guantanamo military commissions allege that he helped in the preparation of the 1998 East Africa Embassy bombings and the 2000 USS Cole bombing and acted as a bodyguard to Osama bin Laden, gaining himself the reputation of an "errand boy". He is formally charged with selecting and helping to train several of the hijackers of the September 11 attacks. On 31 July 2024, Attash agreed to plead guilty to avoid the death penalty. His plea deal was revoked by then-Secretary of Defense Lloyd Austin two days later.

== Life ==
Hailing from a prominent Saudi family on friendly terms with Osama bin Laden, Attash had several brothers fighting during the tumultuous 1990s in Afghanistan. His family was deported from Yemen based on his father's radical views, and he grew up in Saudi Arabia. In his youth, he ran afoul of Saudi authorities for using Hashish.

He studied at the University of Islamic Studies in Karachi, Pakistan.

Attash lost his right leg in 1997 while fighting against the Northern Alliance and wore a metal prosthesis in its place, leading to the nicknames "Father of the Leg" and Silver, the latter a reference to Long John Silver who similarly had only one real leg. His brother was killed in the same battle, and his death led Attash to join al-Qaeda.

He was asked to help obtain explosives to target the USS The Sullivans in 1999, as part of the intended 2000 millennium attack plots.

In late 1999, while using the nom de guerre Khallad, Attash phoned Khalid al-Mihdhar, informing him of the upcoming Kuala Lumpur al-Qaeda Summit. In January 2000, Attash flew to Malaysia, ostensibly to receive a new prosthetic leg, and attended the summit. On January 8, Malaysian Special Branch informed the CIA that Attash had flown to Bangkok together with al-Mihdhar and Nawaf al-Hazmi. While there, the FBI received a transcript of a phone call from Fahd al-Quso and one of the USS Cole bombers, which mentioned giving Attash $5,000 to purchase a new prosthesis. During later interrogation, al-Quso confessed that he was handing over $36,000, and that it wasn't actually meant to purchase a prosthesis.

In October 2000, Attash was identified as the mastermind behind the USS Cole bombing which took place in Aden, Yemen.

On September 11, 2002, his 17-year-old brother Hassan bin Attash was taken prisoner by Pakistani forces raiding the Tariq Road House, handed over to the Americans and sent to The Dark Prison.

== Alleged role in 9/11 attacks ==
In the spring of 1999, Bin Laden selected four individuals to serve as suicide operatives after discussing what U.S. targets to crash planes into. These operatives were identified as Walid bin Attash, Nawaf al-Hazmi, Khalid al-Mihdhar, and Abu Bara al Yemeni. Bin Laden directed Bin Attash to obtain a United States visa so that he could travel to the U.S. and obtain pilot training in order to participate in what Bin Attash termed the "Planes Operation." However, in April 1999 al-Mihdhar was unable to obtain a U.S. visa and returned to Afghanistan. Once back in Afghanistan, Bin Attash administered a forty-five day special course in hand-to-hand combat training at an al Qaeda camp in Logar, Afghanistan, in order to help select trainees for the "Planes Operation." al-Hazmi and al-Mihdhar (both eventual hijackers of American Airlines Flight 77) attended this course and would later be selected as "muscle" hijackers in the 9/11 attacks.

Still wanting Bin Attash to be involved in the planes operation, Khalid Sheikh Mohammed (KSM) split the operation into two parts. The first part involved the planned attacks in the US with the second part involving the hijacking of US-flagged commercial airlines over South East Asia and blowing them up. Bin Attash confirmed this part of the plot and state the intention was to hijack several airlines from various Southeast Asian countries. In December 1999, Bin Attash was trained by KSM in Karachi, Pakistan which involved learning basic English, interpreting and reading airline timetables/flight schedules, making travel arrangements, watching movies that featured hijackings, using flight simulator games and learning how to case flights. Near the end of December 1999, KSM directed Bin Attash to conduct a casing mission in support of the Planes Operation. Bin Attash was given a razor knife to assess airline security and carried this razor knife on flights to Kuala Lumpur, Malaysia, Bangkok, Thailand, and Hong Kong, China. On these flights, Bin Attash collected information on United States air carriers, such as the number of passengers on the flights that were in first class, business class, and economy class. During a January 1, 2000 flight from Bangkok to Hong Kong, Bin Attash flew aboard a U.S. airliner and tested security by carrying his razor onto the plane in his toiletries kit and realized that sitting in first class on that flight did not offer a good view of the cockpit.

Bin Attash traveled to Kuala Lumpur where he met with al-Hazmi and al-Mihdhar and discussed the surveillance obtained while casing flights, which included the security on the flights, secreting the razor knife on board the aircraft, and other flight information for use in the "Planes Operation." During this time Bin Attash was aware that al-Hazmi and al-Mihdhar were involved in an operation involving planes in the U.S. but denied knowing details of the plan. Upon his return to Karachi, Pakistan, Bin Attash prepared a written report and briefed KSM and Mohammed Atef (the military commander of al-Qaeda) on airline security and his ability to get the razor knife on board the flights. Bin Laden would cancel the East Asia portion of the plot in the spring of 2000 as he thought it would be too difficult to coordinate this part of the plan along with the operation in the U.S. Bin Attash would later provide future hijacker Hani Hanjour with an email address in order to contact al-Hazmi in the United States sometime in December 2000.

== Capture, tribunal ==
Attash was captured together with Ali Abdul Aziz Ali in Karachi, on 29 April 2003.

He was sent to The Dark Prison, and his brother was moved to Guantanamo Bay detention camps in 2003 or 2004. While there, he was interrogated under harsh circumstances and confessed that Abderraouf Jdey had been known to him. Despite having only one leg, he was forced to stand in stress positions, "an acutely difficult technique for him" as the Americans took away his false leg, forcing him to balance awkwardly on one foot until losing his balance and ripping at the tendons in his arms.

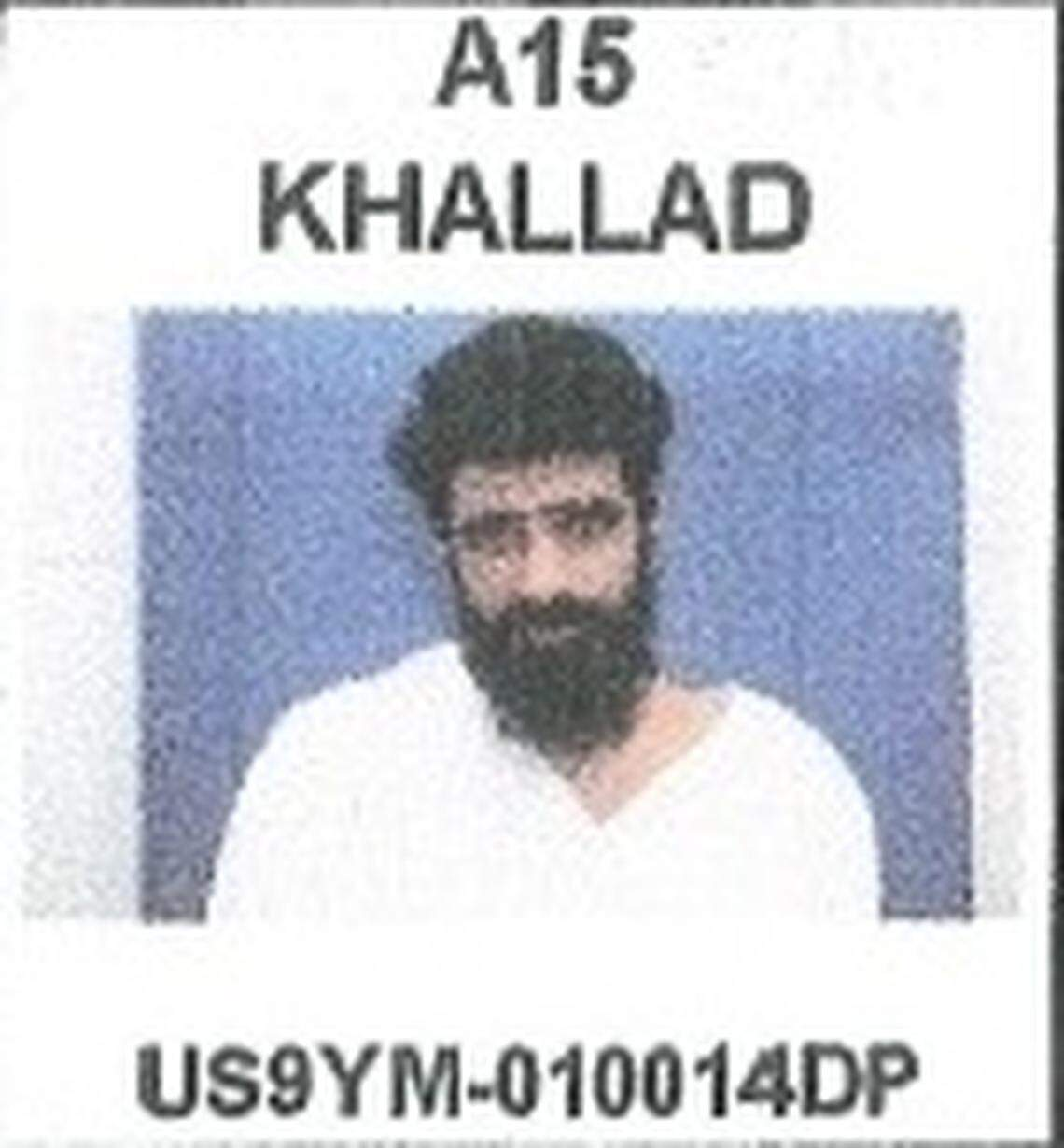
Mug shot of Walid bin Attash taken shortly after he was transferred to the Guantanamo Bay detention camp in September 2006. The photo was obtained by reporters of McClatchyDC.

He was transferred to Guantanamo on 6 September 2006, together with 13 other "high-level detainees" the CIA had been holding in secret detention. He was given victim status in Poland for his alleged torture by Americans in a CIA black site on Polish soil.

== Combatant Status Review Tribunal ==
Having been brought to Guantanamo from black sites, the new prisoners were accorded a new series of Combatant Status Review Tribunals, to determine whether the captives met the new definition of an "enemy combatant". They had been instituted in 2004 to mitigate the Supreme Court's findings that the holding of prisoners at Guantanamo Bay was unconstitutional.

Combatant Status Review Tribunals were held in a 3×5 trailer where the captive sat with his hands and feet shackled to a bolt in the floor. Unlike the 2004 CSR Tribunals the Press was not allowed to attend the 2007 Tribunals.

A Summary of Evidence memo was prepared for the tribunal, listing the alleged facts that led to his detainment. These included that Mohammad Rashed Daoud al-Owhali had stated that Attash had told him to prepare for a suicide carbombing against East African embassies of the United States a month or two before the attacks occurred. The memo alleged that Attash had trained in close-combat in the Lowgar training camp and seen Osama bin Laden give a speech to graduates of the camp. The memo also alleged that Attash used a Yemeni merchant's registration card that had been forged by "a suspect of the USS Cole bombing". An unnamed participant in the Cole bombing also confessed to being given a letter written by Attash which asked for his assistance with the bombing, and was the only reason he aided the bombers.

It also said that authorities knew of an al-Qaeda cell dubbed "Father of the Leg" that revolved around a senior member, and believed this was a reference to Attash due to his missing limb.

It also stated that a contact stored in the phone belonging to Attash was also listed as a contact in a notebook belonging to "a senior al Qaida operative", and that his University ID card had been found "at an alleged al Qaida residence" in Karachi. He was also "implicated" by a notebook found during a raid, which listed payments made to various al-Qaeda members. An unnamed source also claimed to have seen him at al Farouq training camp.

Bin Attash attended his Tribunal. A week after the March 12, 2007, tribunal, Attash was reported to have confessed to his role in preparing both the Cole and Embassy attacks. He confessed purchasing the explosives and small boat used in the Cole bombing, as well as recruiting the perpetrators, and planning the operation 18 months before the actual attack; he stated that he was in Kandahar, Afghanistan with bin Laden at the time of the Cole attack, and in Karachi at the time of the simultaneous embassy bombings meeting with the mastermind of the attack. The DoD was later to publish a ten-page transcript from the unclassified portion of the Tribunal:

I was the link between Usama bin Laden and his deputy Sheikh Abu Hafs al-Masri and the cell chief in Nairobi. I was the link that was available in Pakistan. I used to supply the cell with whatever documents they need from fake stamps to visas, whatever.

His Personal Representative met with him on February 13, and told the tribunal that Attash confirmed that many of the allegations were basically correct, but that he had never owned a telephone and that he had forged the Yemeni registration card himself.

== Military trial ==
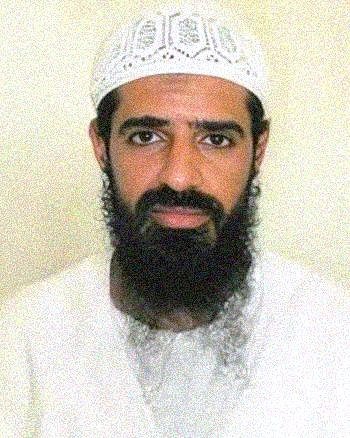
Walid bin Attash in 2010.

The US Department of Defense announced on 9 August 2007, that all fourteen of the "high-value detainees" who had been transferred to Guantanamo from the CIA's black sites, had been officially classified as "enemy combatants". Although judges Peter Brownback and Keith J. Allred had ruled two months earlier that only "illegal enemy combatants" could face military commissions, the Department of Defense waived the qualifier and said that all fourteen men could now face charges before Guantanamo military commissions.

Bin Attash, Khalid Sheikh Mohammed, Ammar al Baluchi chose to serve as their own attorney. They requested laptops, and internet access, in order to prepare their defenses. In October 2008, Ralph Kohlmann ruled that they be provided with the computers, but not the internet access.

On 8 December 2008, Khalid Sheikh Mohammed told the judge that he and the other four indictees wished to confess and plead guilty; however, the plea would be delayed until after mental competency hearings for Hawsawi and bin al-Shibh. Mohammed said, "We want everyone to plead together."

On 17 May 2010, Saba News Agency reported that Walid bin Attash, and four other Yemenis would face charges in the summer of 2010. Two of the other Yemenis Saba News reported would face charges were: Ramzi bin al-Shibh and Abd al-Rahim al-Nashiri.

On 31 May 2011, the Department of Defense announced that capital charges have been re-filed against Bin 'Attash and four other alleged co-conspirators for their alleged roles in the September 11th, 2001 attacks. The charges include: conspiracy, murder in violation of the law of war, attacking civilians, attacking civilian objects, intentionally causing serious bodily injury, destruction of property in violation of the law of war, hijacking aircraft and terrorism. As of December 2022, the case is still in the pretrial phase after years of delays. Reporting in late 2022 indicated that the Biden administration was weighing a possible plea deal with Bin 'Attash and the four other suspected terrorists' Military Commission Trial. On 31 July 2024, Attash agreed to plead guilty to avoid the death penalty. However, it was revoked by Defense Secretary Lloyd Austin two days later.
