= Mark Rossini =

FBI agent

Mark T. Rossini is a former agent with the Federal Bureau of Investigation (FBI) who played a major role in trying to track al-Qaeda before its attacks on the United States on September 11, 2001.

== Role in tracking al-Qaeda operatives in the US ==
"The Spy Factory", an episode of the PBS series Nova, included segments of interviews with Rossini, who described his experience serving as one of the two FBI liaisons to the CIA's Bin Laden Issue Station, an inter-agency team assigned to track Osama bin Laden and his associates. Rossini described being aware in January 2000 that two al-Qaeda members, Nawaf al-Hazmi and Khalid al-Mihdhar, had valid US visas. However, a CIA employee, Michael Anne Casey, reportedly stopped him from passing the information to FBI headquarters. Rossini knew that if he reported this information to his FBI colleagues he would be breaking the law. The two men turned out to be hijackers of American Airlines flight 77 on 9/11.

Rossini also claims Alfreda Frances Bikowsky, a manager at the Bin Laden Issue Station, covered for Casey by telling congressional investigators that she walked from her office to FBI Headquarters to deliver the information about al-Mihdhar having a US visa. FBI log books reportedly proved Bikowsky's claim false.

== Criminal conviction and resignation from FBI ==
In late 2008, Rossini pled guilty to five felony counts for criminally accessing records in an FBI database more than 40 times in 2007. Many of the records were related to a federal investigation of Anthony Pellicano, a former high-profile private investigator. At least one of the records was provided by Rossini to associates of Pellicano and was subsequently used in a court filing by Pellicano's attorneys, leading to the discovery of Rossini's involvement. Rossini resigned from the FBI and was sentenced to probation, community service, and a fine by U.S. Magistrate Judge John M. Facciola on May 14, 2009.

== Puerto Rico bribery allegations ==
In September 2022, Rossini was charged with conspiracy, federal programs bribery, and honest services wire fraud for allegedly having promised Puerto Rico's then-governor, Wanda Vázquez Garced, $300,000 for her re-election campaign in 2020 on the condition that the head of the Puerto Rico Office of the Commissioner of Financial Institutions be removed and replaced with someone chosen by international banker Julio Herrera Velutini.

On August 9, 2022, Rossini turned himself into U.S. authorities in Puerto Rico and declared himself not guilty.

On August 27, 2025, Rossini pleaded guilty to a violation of the Federal Election Campaign Act.

On January 15, 2026, Rossini received a presidential pardon from Donald Trump.

== See also ==
- List of people granted executive clemency in the second Trump presidency
