= Nawaf al-Hazmi =

Saudi terrorist and 9/11 hijacker (1976–2001)

- نواف الحازمي
- al-Hazmi in June 2001
- Born: August 9, 1976; Mecca, Saudi Arabia
- Died: September 11, 2001 (aged 25); Arlington County, Virginia, U.S.
- Cause of death: Suicide by plane crash against the Pentagon during the September 11 attacks
- Known for: Muscle hijacker of American Airlines Flight 77 as part of the September 11 attacks
- Relatives: Salem al-Hazmi (brother)

Nawaf Muhammad Salim al-Hazmi (Arabic: نواف محمد سالم الحازمي, romanized: Nawāf Muḥammad Sālim al-Ḥāzmī; August 9, 1976 – September 11, 2001) was a Saudi terrorist hijacker who was one of five hijackers of American Airlines Flight 77, which they crashed into the Pentagon as part of the September 11 attacks.

Al-Hazmi and a long-time friend, Khalid al-Mihdhar, left their homes in Saudi Arabia in 1995 to fight for Muslims in the Bosnian War. Al-Hazmi later traveled to Afghanistan to fight with the Taliban against the Afghan Northern Alliance. He returned to Saudi Arabia in early 1999.

Already long-time affiliates of al-Qaeda with extensive fighting experience, al-Hazmi and al-Mihdhar were chosen by Osama bin Laden for an ambitious terrorist plot to pilot commercial airliners into designated targets in the United States. Al-Hazmi arrived in Los Angeles, California, on 15 January 2000, alongside al-Mihdhar. The two settled in San Diego, staying at the Parkwood Apartments until May 2000. While in San Diego, they attended its mosque, led by Anwar al-Awlaki. The two took flying lessons in San Diego, but due to their poor English skills they did not perform well during their flight lessons and their flight instructor regarded them as suspicious.

Al-Mihdhar left al-Hazmi in California for Yemen in June 2000. Al-Hazmi stayed in California until he met up with Hani Hanjour in December 2000, and they both traveled to Phoenix, Arizona. They later moved to Falls Church, Virginia, in April 2001, where the rest of the hijackers began to join them. Al-Hazmi met frequently with Mohamed Atta, the ringleader of the attacks, during the summer of 2001. The CIA reportedly received al-Hazmi's name on a list of 19 persons suspected of planning an attack in the near future. Al-Hazmi was one of the four names on the list who were known for certain. A search for al-Hazmi and other suspected terrorists commenced, but they were not located until after the attacks.

The day before the September 11 attacks, al-Hazmi, al-Mihdhar, and Hanjour checked into a hotel in Herndon, Virginia. The next morning, al-Hazmi and four other terrorists, including al-Hazmi's younger brother, Salem al-Hazmi, boarded American Airlines Flight 77 at Dulles International Airport and hijacked the plane so that Hanjour could pilot and crash it into the Pentagon, as part of the attacks. The crash killed all 64 occupants aboard the aircraft and 125 in the Pentagon. Following the attacks, al-Hazmi's participation was initially dismissed as that of a "muscle hijacker", but he was later revealed to have played a larger role in the operational planning than previously believed.

== Early life and activities ==
Nawaf al-Hazmi was born in Mecca in Saudi Arabia to Muhammad Salim al-Hazmi, a grocer. He traveled to Afghanistan as a teenager in 1993. CNN's preliminary report following the attacks claimed that an unnamed acquaintance relayed '"He told me once that his father had tried to kill him when he was a child. He never told me why, but he had a long knife scar on his forearm", and claimed that his older brother was a police chief in Jizan.

In 1995, he and his childhood friend, Khalid al-Mihdhar, joined a group that went to fight alongside Bosnian Muslims in the Bosnian War. Afterwards, Nawaf al-Hazmi returned to Afghanistan along with his brother Salem, and al-Mihdhar. In Afghanistan, they fought alongside the Taliban against the Afghan Northern Alliance, and joined up with al-Qaeda. Al-Hazmi returned to Saudi Arabia in early 1999.

== Selected for the 9/11 plot ==
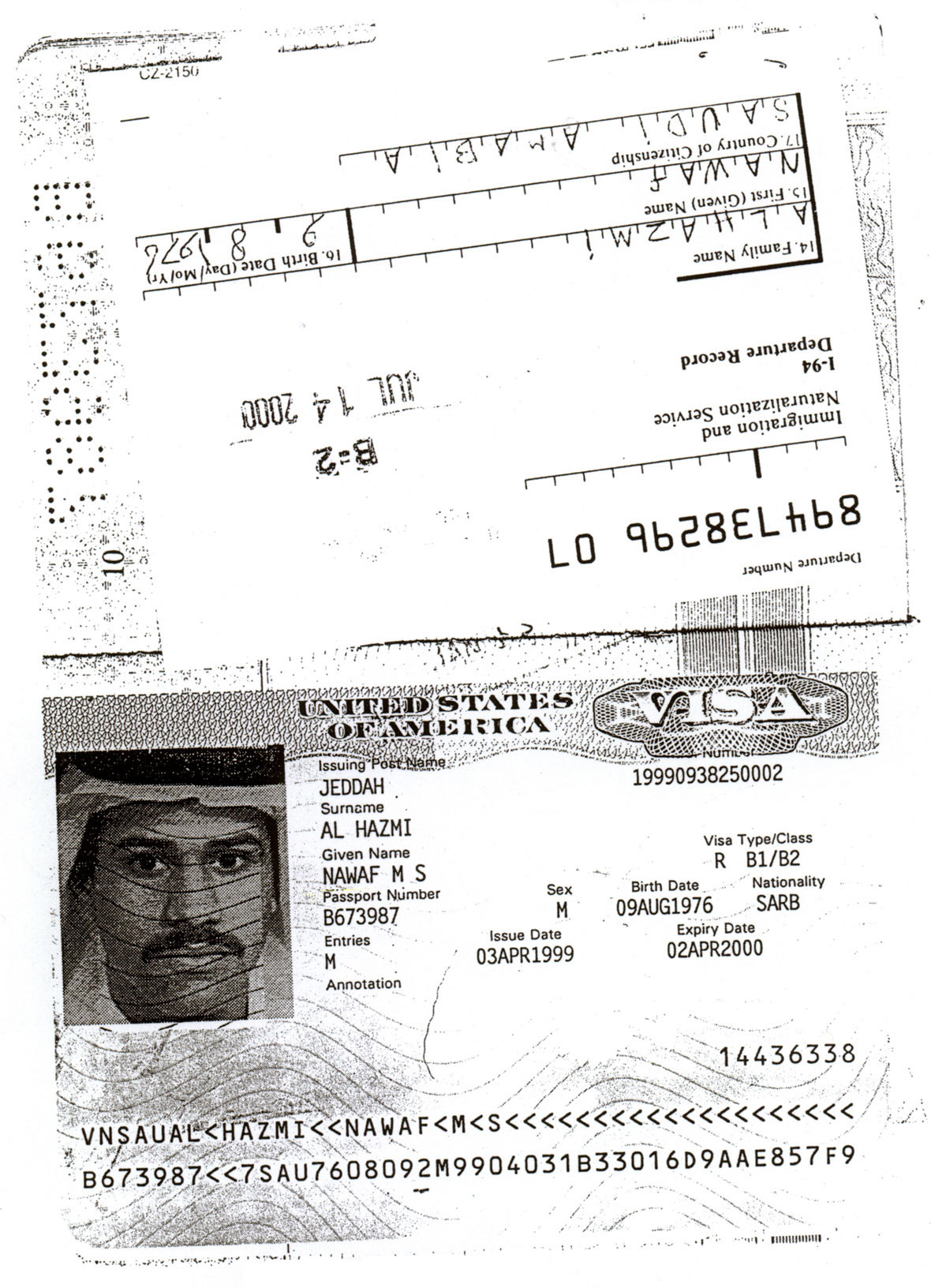
Nawaf al-Hazmi's U.S. visa and I-94 card

Osama bin Laden held al-Hazmi and al-Mihdhar in high respect, with their experience fighting during the 1990s in Bosnia and elsewhere. Al-Qaeda later referred to al-Hazmi as al-Mihdhar's "Second-in-command". When bin Laden committed to the "planes operation" plot in spring 1999, he personally selected al-Hazmi and al-Mihdhar to be involved in the plot as pilot hijackers. In addition to al-Hazmi and al-Mihdhar, two Yemenis were selected for a southeast Asia component of the plot, which was later scrapped for being too difficult to coordinate with the operations in the United States. Known as Rabi'ah al-Makki during the preparations, al-Hazmi had been so eager to participate in operations within the United States, he already had a US visa when bin Laden selected him. Al-Hazmi obtained a B-1/B-2 tourist visa on 3 April 1999, from the US consulate in Jeddah, Saudi Arabia, using a new passport he acquired a few weeks earlier. Al-Hazmi's passport did have indicators of al-Qaeda association, but immigration inspectors were not trained to look for those.

In the autumn of 1999, these four attended the Mes Aynak training camp in Afghanistan, which provided advanced training. Al-Hazmi went with the two Yemenis, Tawfiq bin Attash (Khallad) and Abu Bara al Yemeni, to Karachi, Pakistan, where Khalid Sheikh Mohammed, the plot's coordinator, instructed him on western culture, travel, as well as taught some basic English phrases. Al-Mihdhar did not go with him to Karachi, but instead left for Yemen. Khalid Sheikh Mohammed then sent al-Hazmi and the other men to Malaysia for a meeting. Before leaving for Malaysia, Khalid Sheikh Mohammed doctored al-Hazmi's Saudi passport in order to conceal his travel to Pakistan and Afghanistan, and make it appear that al-Hazmi had come to Malaysia from Saudi Arabia via Dubai.

After the attacks, the Associated Press would re-publish a "bizarre" story by the Cody Enterprise that quoted witnesses stating that al-Hazmi entered the United States during the autumn of 1999, crossing along the Canada–US border as one of two men delivering skylights to the local high school in Cody, Wyoming. Leaving the city 45 minutes later with the remaining cardboard boxes, the men allegedly asked "how to get to Florida".

=== Malaysia summit ===
Based on information uncovered by the FBI in the 1998 United States embassy bombings case, the National Security Agency (NSA) began tracking the communications of al-Mihdhar's father-in-law, Ahmad Muhammad Ali al-Hada, who was facilitating al-Qaeda communications, in 1999. Authorities also became aware of al-Hazmi, as a friend and associate of al-Mihdhar. Saudi Intelligence was also aware that Hazmi was associated with al-Qaeda, and associated with the 1998 African embassy bombings and attempts to smuggle arms into the kingdom in 1997. He also said that he revealed this to the CIA, saying "What we told them was these people were on our watch list from previous activities of al-Qaeda" The CIA strongly denies having received any such warning.

'[W]e've got to tell the Bureau about this. These guys clearly are bad. One of them, at least, has a multiple-entry visa to the U.S. We've got to tell the FBI.' And then [the CIA officer] said to me, 'No, it's not the FBI's case, not the FBI's jurisdiction.'

— Mark Rossini, "The Spy Factory"

In late 1999, the NSA informed the CIA of an upcoming meeting in Malaysia, which al-Hada mentioned would involve "Khalid", "Nawaf", and "Salem". On 5 January, al-Hazmi arrived in Kuala Lumpur, where he met up with al-Mihdhar, bin Attash, and Abu Bara. The group was in Malaysia to meet with Hambali for the 2000 al-Qaeda Summit, during which key details of the attacks may have been arranged. At this time, there was an East Asia component to the 11 September attacks plot, but bin Laden later canceled it for being too difficult to coordinate with operations in the United States. Ramzi bin al-Shibh was also at the summit, and Khalid Sheikh Mohammed possibly attended the summit. In Malaysia, the group stayed with Yazid Sufaat, a local member of Jemaah Islamiyah, who provided accommodations at request of Hambali. Both al-Mihdhar and al-Hazmi were secretly photographed at the meeting by Malaysian authorities, who provided surveillance at the request of the CIA. Malaysian authorities reported that al-Mihdhar spoke at length with Tawfiq bin Attash, one of the Yemenis, and others who were later involved in the USS Cole bombing. Al-Hazmi and al-Mihdhar also met with Fahd al-Quso, who was later involved in the USS Cole bombing. After the meeting, al-Mihdhar and al-Hazmi traveled to Bangkok in Thailand on 8 January, and left a week later on 15 January to travel to the United States.

== In the United States ==
=== Enters the United States with Mihdhar ===
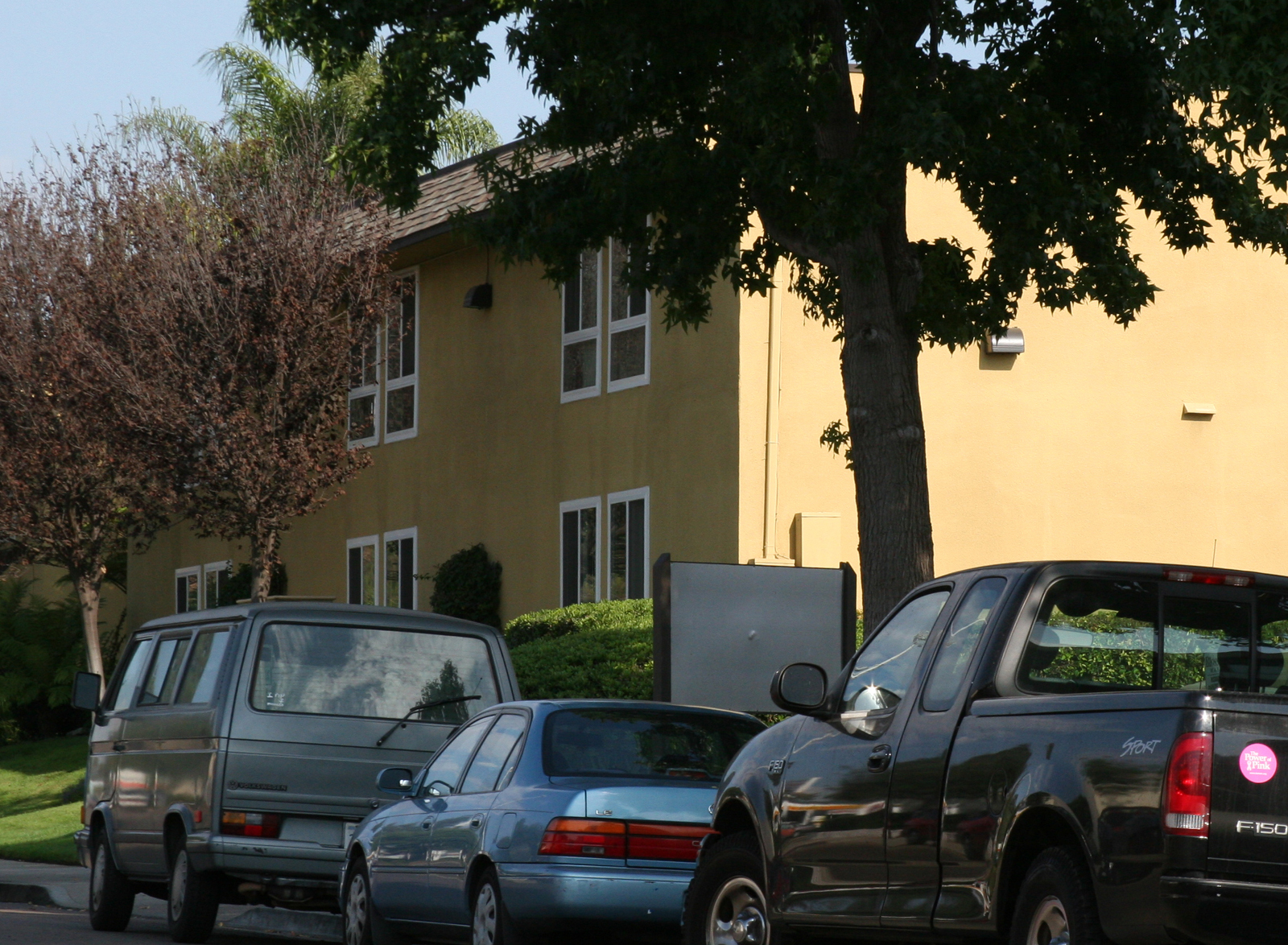
Between February and May 2000, al-Mihdhar and Nawaf al-Hazmi lived at the Parkwood Apartments complex in Clairemont Mesa, San Diego.

On January 15, 2000, al-Hazmi and al-Mihdhar arrived together at Los Angeles International Airport from Bangkok, and were admitted for a six-month period. On February 1, 2000—17 days upon entering the United States—the two men encountered Omar al-Bayoumi and Caysan Bin Don at a halal food restaurant on Venice Boulevard in Culver City. Al-Bayoumi claims he was merely being charitable in helping the two seemingly out-of-place Muslims to move to San Diego where he helped them find an apartment near his own, co-signed their lease, and gave them $1,500 to help pay their rent. FBI documents declassified in 2022 demonstrate that al-Bayoumi was an agent of Saudi intelligence, with the FBI concluding that there was a "50/50 chance" that he (and thus the Saudi government) had foreknowledge of the attacks.

In the beginning of February 2000, al-Mihdhar and al-Hazmi rented an apartment at the Parkwood Apartments, a 175-unit complex in the Clairemont Mesa section of San Diego, near the Balboa Drive Mosque. In February, al-Mihdhar purchased a used 1988 Toyota Corolla. While living at the Parkwood Apartments, neighbors thought that al-Mihdhar and al-Hazmi were odd. Months passed without them getting any furniture for the apartment. Instead, the men slept on mattresses on the floor, yet they carried briefcases, were frequently on their mobile phones, and were occasionally picked up by a limousine. After the attacks, their neighbors told the media that the pair constantly played flight simulator games. Authorities say the two regularly attended the Masjid Ar-Ribat al-Islami mosque that Anwar Al-Awlaki led as the imam in San Diego, having many closed-door meetings with the imam, although Al-Awlaki told authorities their conversations were trivial in nature. While in San Diego, witnesses told the FBI he and al-Mindhar had a close relationship with Anwar Al-Awlaki. Al-Hazmi got a part-time job through the mosque at a nearby car wash.

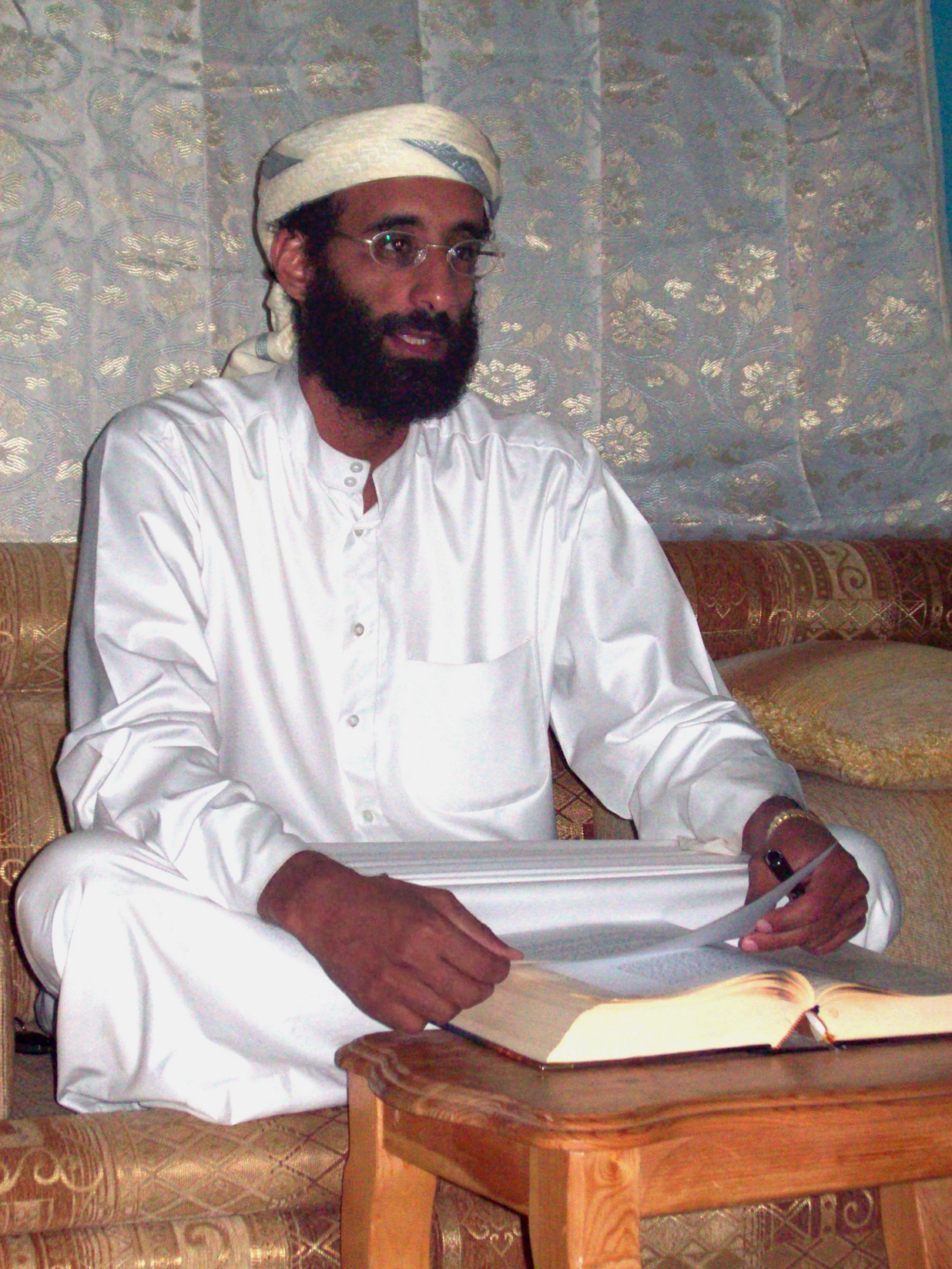
Anwar al-Awlaki in Yemen, 2008

al-Hazmi's California Driver's License application

al-Hazmi's California Driver's License photo taken on April 5, 2000

al-Hazmi's California DMV record

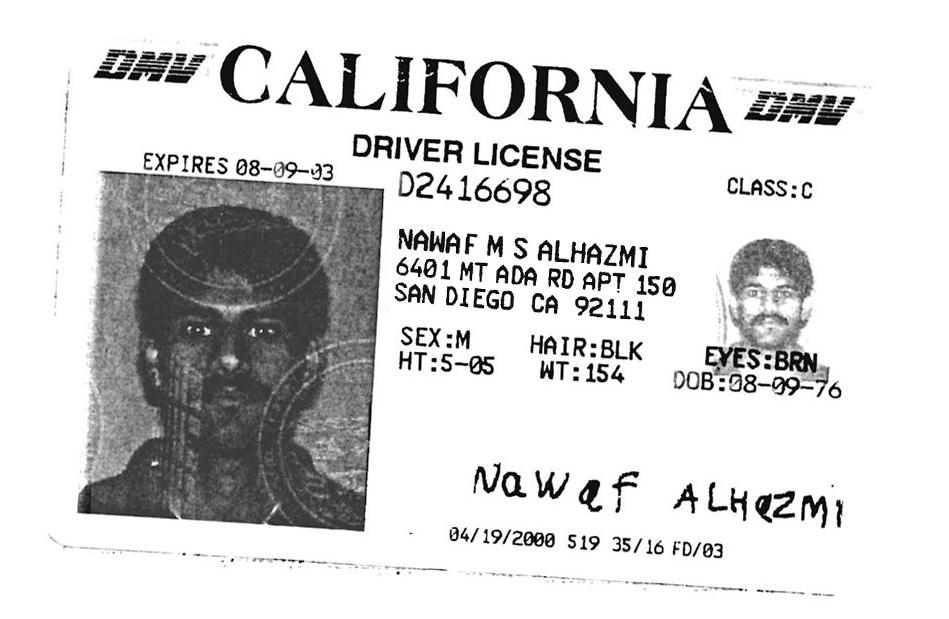
Nawaf al-Hazmi's California Driver's License

On 4 April 2000, al-Hazmi took a one-hour introductory flight lesson at the National Air College in San Diego. Both al-Mihdhar and al-Hazmi took flight lessons in May 2000 at the Sorbi Flying Club, located at Montgomery Field in San Diego. On 5 May, al-Hazmi and al-Mihdhar took a lesson for one hour, and additional lessons on 10 May at the Sorbi Flying Club, with al-Hazmi flying an aircraft for 30 minutes. However, their English skills were very poor, and they did not do well with flight lessons. The first day that they showed up, they told instructors that they wanted to learn how to fly Boeings. Al-Mihdhar and al-Hazmi raised some suspicion when they offered extra money to their flight instructor, Richard Garza, if he would train them to fly jets. Suspicious of the two men, Garza refused the offer but did not report them to authorities. Garza described the two men as "impatient students" who "wanted to learn to fly jets, specifically Boeings."

Adel Rafeea received a wire transfer of $5,000, on 18 April, from Ali Abdul Aziz Ali in the UAE, which he later claimed was money al-Hazmi had asked him to accept on his behalf.

At the end of May 2000, al-Hazmi and al-Mihdhar moved out of Parkwood Apartments, and moved to nearby Lemon Grove, California. Two days later—on 2 June—al-Mihdhar transferred his vehicle's registration to al-Hazmi, and departed the U.S. for Frankfurt, Germany on 10 June 2000. Al-Mihdhar returned to Yemen, which angered Khalid Sheikh Mohammed, who did not want al-Hazmi to be left alone in California.

On 12 July 2000, al-Hazmi filed for an extension of his visa, which was due to expire. His visa was extended until January 2001, though al-Hazmi never filed any further requests to extend it beyond that.

In September, al-Hamzi and al-Mihdhar both moved into the house of FBI informant Abdussattar Shaikh, although he did not report the pair as suspicious. Al-Mihdhar is believed to have left the apartment in early October, less than two weeks before the USS Cole bombing. Al-Hazmi continued living with Shaikh until December.

Hani Hanjour arrived in San Diego in early December 2000, where he joined al-Hazmi, but on 10 December they were seen leaving their Mount Vernon address. The two men traveled to Phoenix, Arizona, where Hanjour could take refresher flight training classes. On 12 December, they arrived at Mesa, Arizona. On 22 December, Hanjour and al-Hazmi signed a lease for an apartment in the Indian Springs Village complex in Mesa, moving in on 9 January 2001.

=== 2001 ===
In March, al-Hazmi received a shipment of VHS videos including videos about Boeing 747 and 777 flight decks and "how an airline captain should look and act" and later a road atlas, map of New York City and a World aeronautical chart.

On 30 March, al-Hazmi notified his utility company that he might be moving to another state or Saudi Arabia. He and Hanjour moved out before the apartment rental expired at the end of the month on their way to Virginia. Two days later on 1 April 2001, Oklahoma police officer C. L. Parkins pulled al-Hazmi over for speeding in their Corolla along with an additional citation for failing to use a seatbelt together totaling $138. A routine inspection of his California drivers license turned up no warrants or alerts, although his name was known to both the NSA and the CIA as a suspected terrorist.

Anwar al-Awlaki had already headed east and served as Imam at the Dar al-Hijrah mosque in the metropolitan Washington, DC area starting in January 2001. Shortly after this, his sermons were attended by three of the 9/11 hijackers (the new one being Hanjour).

By 3 April, he was likely with companion Hani Hanjour when he was recorded at an ATM in Front Royal, Virginia, arriving in Falls Church, Virginia, by 4 April. They met a man believed to be a Jordanian named Eyad Alrababah at a 7-11 that day. The 9/11 Commission wrote that al-Hazmi and Hanjour met Alrababah at the Dar al Hijra mosque who was a computer technician who had moved from West Paterson, New Jersey and was there to ask imam Anwar al-Awlaki about finding a job. He helped the pair rent an apartment in Alexandria where they moved in.

The 9/11 Commission concluded that two of the hijackers "reportedly respected al-Awlaki as a religious figure". Police found his telephone number in the contacts of Ramzi bin al-Shibh (the "20th hijacker") when they searched his Hamburg apartment while investigating the 9/11 attacks.

On 1 May 2001, al-Hazmi reported to police that a man tried to take his wallet outside his Fairfax, Virginia, residence, but before the county officer left, al-Hazmi signed a "statement of release" indicating he did not want the incident investigated.

The day after, on 2 May, two other hijackers, Ahmed al-Ghamdi and Majed Moqed, arrived in Virginia and moved in with them. On 8 May, Alrababah suggested that al-Hazmi and al-Mihdhar move with him to Fairfield, Connecticut, and helped all four hijackers move to a hotel there. They called area flight schools and after a few days Alrababah drove the four to Paterson, New Jersey, to show them around. Some FBI agents suspected that al-Awlaki gave Alrababah the job of helping al-Hazmi and Hanjour. Alrababah was later arrested as a witness convicted after 9/11 in a fraudulent driver's license scheme and deported to Jordan.

On 21 May, al-Hazmi moved in with Hanjour into an apartment in Paterson New Jersey. Mohamed Atta was living in the same city at another location.

On 30 June, al-Hazmi's car was involved in a minor traffic accident on the east-bound George Washington Bridge. On 25 June 2001, al-Hazmi obtained a drivers' license in Florida, providing an address in Delray Beach, Florida, and he obtained a USA ID card on 10 July.

On 20 July, al-Hazmi and fellow hijacker Hani Hanjour flew to the Montgomery County Airpark in Maryland from on a practice flight from Fairfield, New Jersey.

Al-Hazmi, along with at least five other future hijackers, traveled to Las Vegas, Nevada, at least six times in the summer of 2001. They reportedly drank alcohol, gambled, and paid strippers to perform lap dances for them.

Throughout the summer, al-Hazmi met with leader Mohamed Atta to discuss the status of the operation of a monthly basis.

On 23 August, Israeli Mossad reportedly gave his name to the CIA as one of 19 belonging to US residents who they said were planning to attack the United States in the near future. Only four of the names are known for certain, the other three belonging to fellow 9/11 hijackers Mohamed Atta, Marwan al-Shehhi, and Khalid al-Mihdhar, but it is not known if all 19 of the 9/11 hijackers' names were on the list or if the list had 19 names by sheer coincidence. Regardless, the connection was not made with previous contacts by local law enforcement. On the same day, he was added to an INS watch list, along with al-Mihdhar, to prevent entry into the US.

An internal review after 9/11 found that "everything was done [to find them] that could have been done." However, the search does not appear to have been particularly aggressive. A national motor vehicle index was reportedly checked, but al-Hazmi's speeding ticket was not detected for some reason. The FBI did not search credit card databases, bank account databases, or car registration, all of which would have produced positive results. Al-Hazmi was even listed in the 2000–2001 San Diego phone book, but this too was not searched until after the attacks. He had not been placed on terrorist watch lists, nor did the CIA or NSA alert the FBI, Customs and Immigration, or local police and enforcement agencies.

On 27 August, brothers Nawaf and Salem Al-Hazmi purchased flight tickets through Travelocity.com using Nawaf's Visa card.

On 1 September, Nawaf Al-Hazmi registered Room #7 at the Pin-Del Motel in Laurel, Maryland. On the registration, he listed his driver's license number as 3402142-D, and gave a New York hotel as his permanent residence. Ziad Jarrah had checked into the hotel on 27 August.

Al-Hazmi and al-Mihdhar purchased their 9/11 plane tickets online using a credit card with their real names. This raised no red flags, since the FAA had not been informed that the two were on a terrorist watchlist.

== Attacks ==
Nawaf and Salem at Dulles International Airport on September 11, 2001

On September 10, the day before the September 11 attacks, Hanjour, al-Mihdhar, and al-Hazmi checked into the Marriott Residence Inn in Herndon, Virginia, where Saleh Ibn Abdul Rahman Hussayen, a prominent Saudi government official, was staying – although no evidence was ever uncovered that they had met, or knew of each other's presence.

On the morning of September 11, al-Hazmi boarded American Airlines Flight 77. The flight was scheduled to depart at 08:10 but ended up departing 10 minutes late from Gate D26 at Dulles. The last normal radio communications from the aircraft to air traffic control occurred at 08:50:51. At 08:54, the hijackers sent pilots Charles Burlingame and David Charlesbois to the back of the plane. Flight 77 began to deviate from its normal, assigned flight path and turned south. The hijackers then set the flight's autopilot in the direction of Washington, D.C. Passenger Barbara Olson called her husband, United States Solicitor General Theodore Olson, and reported that the plane had been hijacked and that the assailants had box cutters and knives. At 09:37, American Airlines Flight 77 crashed into the west facade of the Pentagon, killing all 64 aboard (including the hijackers) along with 125 in the Pentagon.

== Aftermath ==
Nawaf al-Hazmi's 1988 blue Toyota Corolla was found on the next day in Dulles International Airport's hourly parking lot. Inside the vehicle, authorities found a letter written by Mohamed Atta, maps of Washington, D.C. and New York City, a cashier's check made out to a Phoenix flight school, four drawings of a Boeing 757 cockpit, a box cutter, and a page with notes and phone numbers.

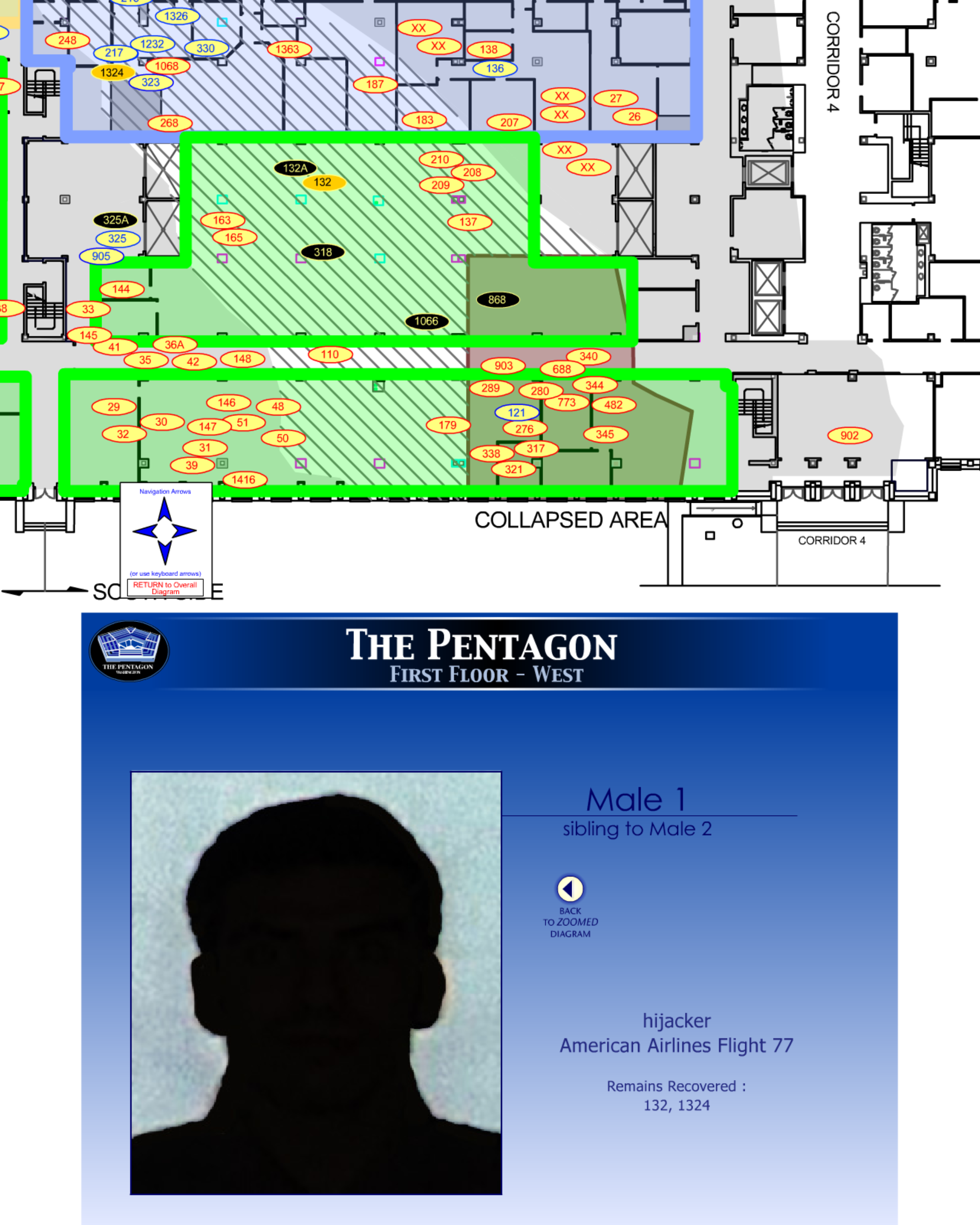
Information about the recovery of al-Hazmi's remains (132 and 1324) from a Moussaoui trial presentation.

In the recovery process at the Pentagon, remains of all five Flight 77 hijackers were identified through a process of elimination, as not matching any DNA samples for the victims, and put into custody of the FBI. Forensics teams confirmed that it seemed two of the hijackers were brothers, based on their DNA similarities.

Several weeks after the attacks, a Las Vegas Days Inn employee went to the FBI and stated that she recognized al-Hazmi's photographs from the media as being a man she had met at the hotel, who had asked for details on hotels near Los Angeles. She admitted that he never gave his name.

== Timeline in America ==
Late in 2005, Army Lt. Col. Kevin Shaffer and Congressman Curt Weldon alleged that the Defense Department data mining project Able Danger had kept Nawaf al-Hazmi, Khalid al-Mihdhar, Mohamed Atta and Marwan al-Shehhi all under surveillance as al-Qaeda agents.

- 15 January 2000: al-Hazmi and al-Mihdhar arrive in Los Angeles from Bangkok, Thailand.
- February 2000: al-Hazmi and al-Mihdhar move to San Diego.
- Autumn 2000: al-Hamzi works at a gas station while living in San Diego.
- March 2001: Nawaf al-Hazmi and Hani Hanjour move from Phoenix to Falls Church, Virginia.
- Mid-March 2001: Nawaf al-Hazmi, Ahmed al-Ghamdi, Majed Moqed, and Hani Hanjour stay for four days in the Fairfield Motor Inn, Fairfield, Connecticut. They meet with Eyad Alrababah, a Palestinian who may have provided false identification documents.

== In popular culture ==
- Arabic actor Massey Ahmar portrayed Nawaf al-Hazmi in the Canadian TV series Mayday Season 16: Episode 2 (2016) called "9/11: The Pentagon Attack" and Air Crash Investigation Special Report Season 2: Episode 1 (2019) called "Headline News".

== See also ==
- PENTTBOM
- Hijackers in the 11 September attacks
