= Kuala Lumpur al-Qaeda summit =

2000 meeting of the Islamist militant group

- Date: 5–8 January 2000
- Location: Kuala Lumpur, Malaysia

The 2000 Kuala Lumpur al-Qaeda Summit was a meeting of several high-level al-Qaeda members held in Kuala Lumpur, Malaysia from 5 to 8 January 2000. During this conference, the USS Cole bombing and September 11 attacks were planned. The CIA and Malaysian government came under fire for failing to identify members of the summit and arrest them before the attacks were successfully carried out.

== The summit ==
The three-day-long meeting was held in the hotel room of Yazid Sufaat, a former Malaysian Army captain and businessman, in a condo unit in Kuala Lumpur. The attendance consisted of Arab veterans of the Soviet–Afghan War, including Hambali, Ramzi bin al-Shibh, Nawaf al-Hazmi, Khalid al-Mihdhar and Tawfiq bin Attash.

Before the meeting, the United States intercepted a telephone call to Yemen by al-Mihdhar concerning arrangements for the trip. Osama bin Laden had called that number dozens of times.

== Intelligence failure ==
By request of the CIA, Malaysian authorities videotaped the meeting, without audio. The men were also photographed when they came out of the meeting. American investigators did not identify these men until much later.

Ramzi bin al-Shibh's attendance at the meeting was discovered by the investigators by looking into his credit card records. Sufaat was later arrested, but he denied that he knew any of the men and said that Hambali had arranged the meeting.

The men flew to Bangkok, where the CIA lost track of them. Several months later, in March 2000, the CIA found out that Hazmi had flown to Los Angeles. Unbeknownst to the CIA, al-Mihdhar arrived on the same flight. The FBI was never notified, and nothing more was done to locate the suspects.
