= Ahmad Mohammad Ali al-Hada =

Al-Qaeda operative from Yemen

- Born: Unknown; Dhamar Governorate, Yemen
- Occupation: al-Qaeda "switchboard" host
- Children: 1
- Military career
- Allegiance: Al-Qaeda: Al-Qaeda Central (1980s–1996); Islamic Jihad of Yemen (1996–2009); AQAP (2009–present)
- Service years: 1980s–?
- Rank: Officer of Al-Qaeda and communications supervisor
- Conflicts: Soviet–Afghan War; Yemen Insurgency; Yemeni Civil War ?

Ahmad Mohammad Ali al-Hada is an al-Qaeda operative from Yemen whose family was described by US government officials as a "supercell" within the al-Qaeda network. By February 2002, the "communications hub" which al-Hada running was no longer active following the death of his son, Samir.

== Early life and Al-Qaeda ==
Al-Hada is native of Dhamar Governorate, and is a veteran of Soviet–Afghan War, where he met Osama bin Laden. It's reported that al-Hada was a close friend of Bin Laden. From 1996 until 2006, he operated, along with his son, Samir Al-Hada, an al-Qaeda safe house and a communication center in Sana'a, which was the direct link from al-Qaeda central to Yemen. He was captured by the Yemeni government in 2006, but was set free, possibly after a tribal deal. As of 2007, his whereabouts are unknown.

== Family ==
Al-Hada's son-in-law, Khalid al-Mihdhar, was one of the hijackers that flew American Airlines Flight 77 into the Pentagon as part of the September 11 attacks. Another son-in-law, Mustafa Abdulkader, has been listed on FBI terror alerts. In February 2002, Al-Hada's son, Samir al-Hada, committed suicide using a hand grenade, to avoid questioning by security forces about the Cole bombing. Two of Ahmed Al-Hada’s brothers were killed in Afghanistan during operation “Absolute Justice” in the War in Afghanistan and a third brother, Abdullah Al-Hada, is wanted by the Yemen authorities for terror charges.

== USS Cole bombing ==
Al-Hada allegedly provided the telephone number in Yemen that served as the switchboard for al-Qaeda operations leading up to the USS Cole bombing and September 11 attacks. In The Looming Tower he was cited as being in Yemeni custody.
