= Khalid al-Mihdhar =

Saudi terrorist and 9/11 hijacker (1975–2001)

- خالد المحضار
- al-Mihdhar in April 2000
- Born: Khalid Muhammad Abdallah al-Mihdhar; May 16, 1975; Mecca, Saudi Arabia
- Died: September 11, 2001 (aged 26); Arlington County, Virginia, U.S.
- Cause of death: Suicide by plane crash against the Pentagon (September 11 attacks)
- Known for: Muscle hijacker of American Airlines Flight 77 as part of the September 11 attacks
- Spouse: Hoda al-Hada
- Children: 2 daughters
- Relatives: Ahmed al-Darbi (brother-in-law); Ahmad al-Hada (father-in-law)

Khalid Muhammad Abdallah al-Mihdhar (Arabic: خالد محمد عبد الله المحضار, romanized: Khālid al-Miḥḍār; also transliterated as AL Mihdhar; May 16, 1975 (Note: There is some discrepancy over Mihdhar's date of birth. The National Commission on Terrorist Attacks Upon the United States observes that "Mihdhar uses May 16, 1975 as his birthdate on his ID, as well as on his U.S. visa." See 9/11 and Terror Travel Archived 2008-10-05 at the Wayback Machine, p. 192 for ID card; see also copy of Mihdhar's visa. George Tenet gave testimony that "The CIA gave Mihdhar's birthdate as May 5, 1975" ("11 September 2001 Hijackers" (PDF). Testimony by George Tenet before the Joint Inquiry into Terrorist Attacks Against the United States. Federation of American Scientists (FAS). 18 June 2002. Archived (PDF) from the original on 5 October 2008.).) – September 11, 2001) was a Saudi terrorist hijacker. He was one of the five hijackers of American Airlines Flight 77, which was flown into the Pentagon as part of the September 11 attacks.

Al-Mihdhar was born in Saudi Arabia. In early 1999, he traveled to Afghanistan where, as an experienced and respected jihadist, he was selected by Osama bin Laden to participate in the attacks. Al-Mihdhar arrived in California with fellow hijacker Nawaf al-Hazmi in January 2000, after traveling to Malaysia for the Kuala Lumpur al-Qaeda Summit. At this point, the Central Intelligence Agency (CIA) was aware of al-Mihdhar, and he was photographed in Malaysia with another al-Qaeda member who was involved in the bombing of the USS Cole. The CIA did not inform the Federal Bureau of Investigation (FBI) when it learned that al-Mihdhar and al-Hazmi had entered the United States, and al-Mihdhar was not placed on any watchlists until late August 2001.

Upon arriving in San Diego County, California, al-Mihdhar and al-Hazmi were to train as pilots, but spoke English poorly and did not do well with flight lessons. In June 2000, al-Mihdhar left the United States for Yemen, leaving al-Hazmi behind in San Diego. Al-Mihdhar spent some time in Afghanistan in early 2001 and returned to the United States in early July 2001. He stayed in New Jersey in July and August, before arriving in the Washington, D.C., area at the beginning of September.

On the morning of 11 September 2001, al-Mihdhar boarded American Flight 77 and assisted in the hijacking of the plane, which was hijacked approximately 30 minutes after takeoff. Al-Mihdhar and his team of hijackers then deliberately crashed the plane into the Pentagon, killing themselves and all 59 people aboard the flight, in addition to 125 on the ground.

== Background ==
Al-Mihdhar was born on May 16, 1975, in Mecca, Saudi Arabia, to a prominent family that belonged to the Quraysh tribe of Mecca. Little is known about his life before the age of 20, when he and childhood friend Nawaf al-Hazmi went to Bosnia and Herzegovina to fight with the mujahideen in the Bosnian War. After the war, al-Mihdhar and al-Hazmi went to Afghanistan where they fought alongside the Taliban against the Northern Alliance, and al-Qaeda would later dub al-Hazmi his "second in command". In 1997, al-Mihdhar told his family that he was leaving to fight in Chechnya, though it is not certain that he actually went to Chechnya. The same year, both men attracted the attention of Saudi Intelligence, who believed they were involved in arms smuggling, and the following year they were eyed as possible collaborators in the 1998 United States embassy bombings in East Africa after it emerged that Mohamed Rashed Daoud Al-Owhali had given the FBI the phone number of al-Mihdhar's father-in-law; 967-1-200578, which turned out to be a key communications hub for al-Qaeda militants, and eventually tipped off the Americans about the upcoming Kuala Lumpur al-Qaeda Summit.

In the late 1990s, al-Mihdhar married Hoda al-Hada, who was the sister of a comrade from Yemen, and they had two daughters. Through marriage, al-Mihdhar was related to a number of individuals involved with al-Qaeda in some way. Al-Mihdhar's father-in-law, Ahmad Mohammad Ali al-Hada, helped facilitate al-Qaeda communications in Yemen, and in late 2001, al-Mihdhar's brother-in-law, Ahmed al-Darbi, was captured in Azerbaijan and sent to Guantanamo Bay on charges of supporting a plot to bomb ships in the Strait of Hormuz.

=== Selection for the attacks ===
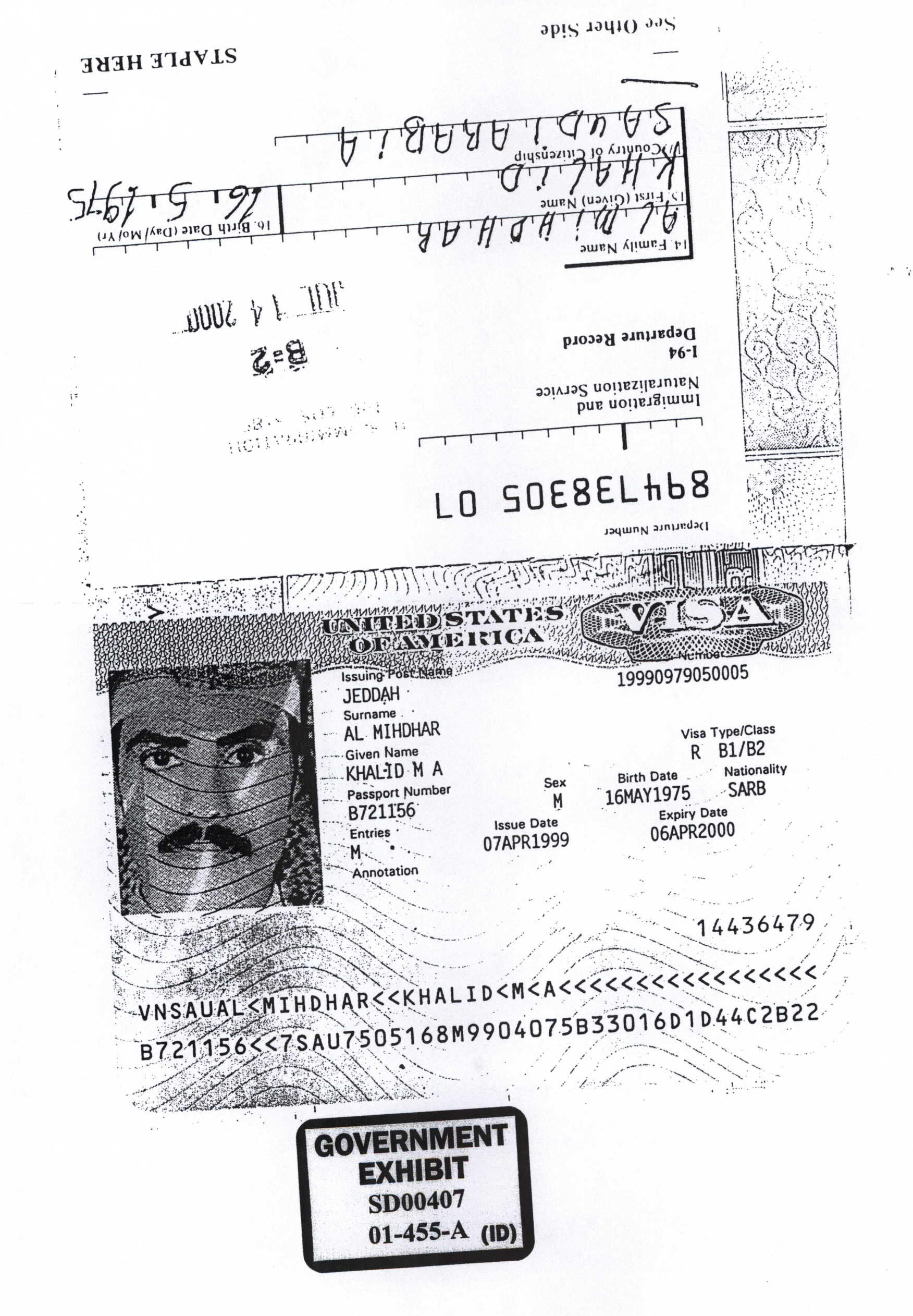
Khalid al-Mihdhar's first U.S. visa and I-94 card

In Spring 1999, al-Qaeda founder Osama bin Laden committed to support the 9/11 attacks plot, which was largely organized by prominent al-Qaeda member Khalid Sheikh Mohammed. Al-Mihdhar and al-Hazmi were among the first group of participants selected for the operation, along with Tawfiq bin Attash and Abu Bara al Yemeni, al-Qaeda members from Yemen. Al-Mihdhar, who had spent time in al-Qaeda camps in the 1990s, was known to and highly regarded by Bin Laden. Al-Mihdhar was so eager to participate in jihad operations in the United States that he had already obtained a one-year B-1/B-2 (tourist/business) multiple-entry visa from the consulate in Jeddah, Saudi Arabia, on April 7, 1999, one day after obtaining a new passport. Al-Mihdhar listed the Los Angeles Sheraton as his intended destination.

Once selected, al-Mihdhar and al-Hazmi were sent to the Mes Aynak training camp in Afghanistan. In late 1999, al-Hazmi, bin Attash and al Yemeni went to Karachi, Pakistan to see Mohammed, who instructed them on Western culture and travel; however, al-Mihdhar did not go to Karachi, instead returning to Yemen. He was known as Sinaan during the preparations.

== 2000 ==
=== Malaysia summit ===
The CIA was aware of al-Mihdhar and al-Hazmi's involvement with al-Qaeda, having been informed by Saudi intelligence during a 1999 meeting in Riyadh. Based on information uncovered by the FBI in the 1998 United States embassy bombings case, the National Security Agency (NSA) began tracking the communications of Hada, al-Mihdhar's father-in-law. In late 1999, the NSA informed the CIA of an upcoming meeting in Malaysia, which Hada mentioned would involve "Khalid", "Nawaf", and "Salem", who was al-Hazmi's younger brother, Salem al-Hazmi.

On 4 January 2000, al-Mihdhar left Yemen and flew to Dubai, United Arab Emirates, where he spent the night. The CIA broke into his hotel room and photocopied his passport, which gave them his full name, birth information and passport number for the first time, and alerted them that he held an entry visa to the United States. The photocopy was sent to the CIA's Alec Station, which was tracking al-Qaeda.

On 5 January 2000, al-Mihdhar traveled to Kuala Lumpur, where he joined al-Hazmi, bin Attash, and al-Yemeni, who were all arriving from Pakistan. Hamburg cell member Ramzi bin al-Shibh was also at the summit, and Mohammed possibly attended. The group was in Malaysia to meet with Hambali, the leader of Jemaah Islamiyah, an Asian al-Qaeda affiliate. During the Kuala Lumpur al-Qaeda Summit, many key details of the 9/11 attacks may have been arranged. At the time, the attacks plot had an additional component involving hijacking aircraft in Asia, as well as in the United States. Bin Attash and al-Yemeni were slated for this part of the plot. However, it was later canceled by bin Laden for being too difficult to coordinate with United States operations.

'[W]e've got to tell the Bureau about this. These guys clearly are bad. One of them, at least, has a multiple-entry visa to the U.S. We've got to tell the FBI.' And then [the CIA officer] said to me, 'No, it's not the FBI's case, not the FBI's jurisdiction.'

— Mark Rossini, "The Spy Factory"

In Malaysia, the group stayed with Yazid Sufaat, a local Jemaah Islamiyah member, who provided accommodation at Hambali's request. Both al-Mihdhar and al-Hazmi were secretly photographed at the meeting by Malaysian authorities, whom the CIA had asked to provide surveillance. The Malaysians reported that al-Mihdhar spoke at length with bin Attash, and he met with Fahd al-Quso and others who were later involved in the USS Cole bombing. After the meeting, al-Mihdhar and al-Hazmi traveled to Bangkok, Thailand, on 8 January and left a week later on 15 January for the United States.

=== United States entry ===
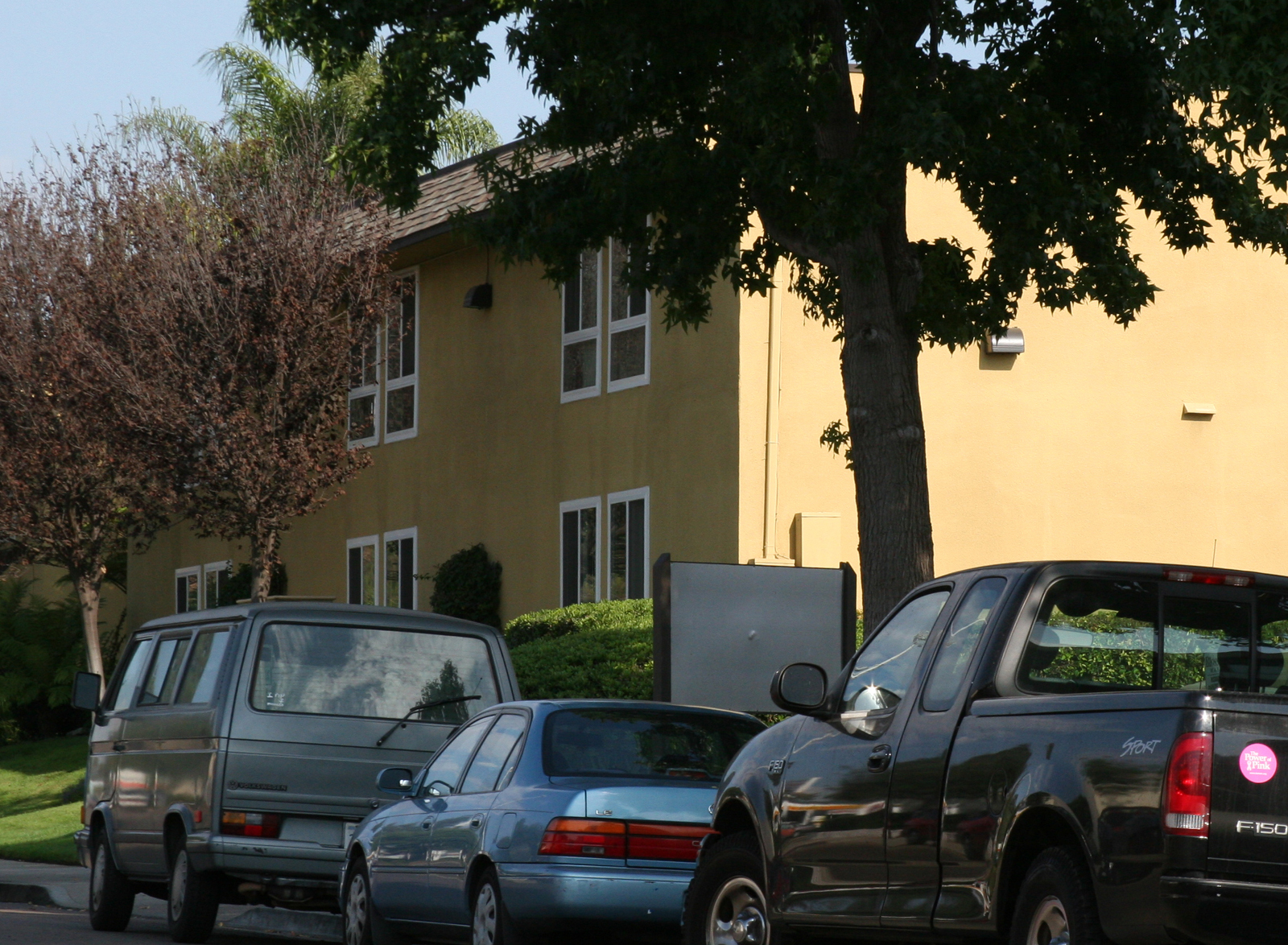
Parkwood Apartments complex, located in the Clairemont Mesa section of San Diego, where Mihdhar and Nawaf al-Hazmi lived from February until the end of May 2000

On 15 January 2000, al-Mihdhar and al-Hazmi arrived at Los Angeles International Airport from Bangkok and were admitted as tourists for a period of six months. On 1 February 2000–17 days upon entering the United States—the two men encountered Omar al-Bayoumi and Caysan Bin Don at a halal food restaurant on Venice Boulevard in Culver City. Al-Bayoumi claimed he was merely being charitable in assisting the two seemingly out-of-place Muslims with moving to San Diego, where he helped them find an apartment near his own, co-signed their lease, and gave them $1,500 to help pay their rent. Mohammed later claimed that he suggested San Diego as their destination, based on information gleaned from a San Diego phone book that listed language and flight schools. Mohammed also recommended that the two seek assistance from the local Muslim community, since neither spoke English nor had experience with Western culture.

While in San Diego, witnesses told the FBI he and al-Hazmi had a close relationship with Anwar al-Awlaki, an imam who served as their spiritual advisor. Authorities say the two regularly attended the Masjid Ar-Ribat al-Islami mosque al-Awlaki led in San Diego, and al-Awlaki had many closed-door meetings with them, which led investigators to believe al-Awlaki knew about the 9/11 attacks in advance.

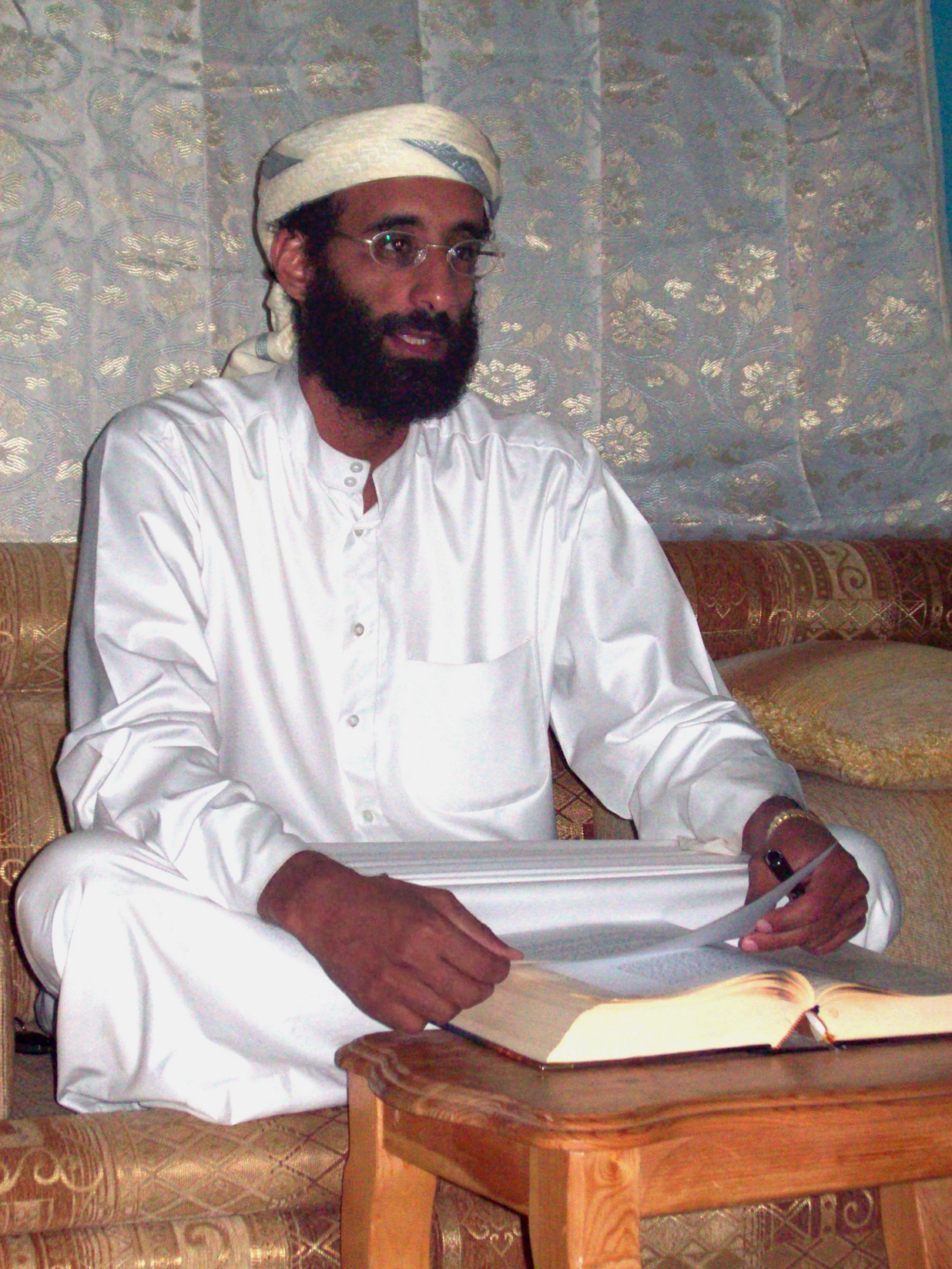
Anwar al-Awlaki in Yemen, 2008

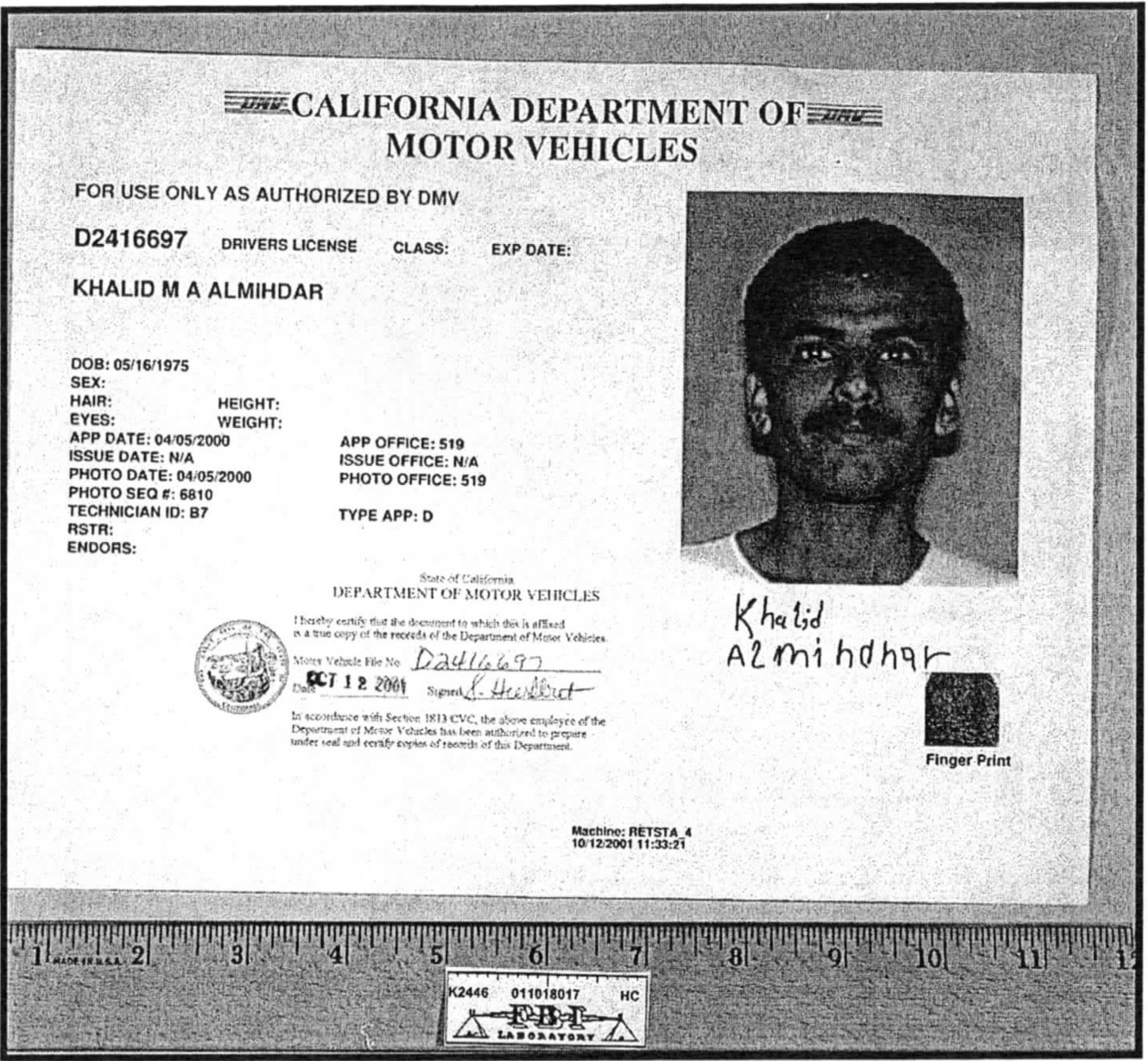
Khalid al-Mihdhar's California Driver's License record

In early February 2000, al-Mihdhar and al-Hazmi rented an apartment at the Parkwood Apartments complex in the Clairemont Mesa area of San Diego, and al-Mihdhar purchased a used 1988 Toyota Corolla. Neighbors thought that al-Mihdhar and al-Hazmi were odd because months passed without the men getting any furniture, and they slept on mattresses on the floor, yet they carried briefcases, were frequently on their mobile phones, and were occasionally picked up by a limousine. Those who met al-Mihdhar in San Diego described him as "dark and brooding, with a disdain for American culture". Neighbors also said that the pair constantly played flight simulator games.

Al-Mihdhar and al-Hazmi took flight lessons on 5 May 2000, at the Sorbi Flying Club in San Diego, with al-Mihdhar flying an aircraft for 42 minutes. They took additional lessons on 10 May; however, with poor English skills, they did not do well with flight lessons. Al-Mihdhar and Al-Hazmi raised some suspicion when they offered extra money to their flight instructor, Rick Garza, if he would train them to fly jets. Garza refused the offer but did not report them to authorities. After the 9/11 attacks, Garza described the two men as "impatient students" who "wanted to learn to fly jets, specifically Boeings".

=== Return to Yemen ===
Al-Mihdhar and al-Hazmi moved out of the Parkwood Apartments at the end of May 2000, and al-Mihdhar transferred registration for the Toyota Corolla to al-Hazmi. On 10 June 2000, al-Mihdhar left the United States and returned to Yemen to visit his wife, against the wishes of Mohammed who wanted him to remain in the United States to help al-Hazmi adapt. Mohammed was so angered by this that he decided to remove al-Mihdhar from the 9/11 plot, but he was overruled by bin Laden. Al-Mihdhar remained part of the plot as a muscle hijacker, who would help take over the aircraft. On 12 October 2000, the USS Cole was bombed by a small boat loaded with explosives. After the bombing, Yemeni Prime Minister Abdul Karim al-Iryani reported that al-Mihdhar had been one of the key planners of the attack and had been in the country at the time of the attacks. In late 2000, al-Mihdhar was back in Saudi Arabia, staying with a cousin in Mecca.

== 2001 ==
In February 2001, al-Mihdhar returned to Afghanistan for several months, possibly entering across the Iranian border after a flight from Syria. FBI director Robert Mueller later stated his belief that al-Mihdhar served as the coordinator and organizer for the muscle hijackers. He was the last of the muscle hijackers to return to the United States. On 10 June, he returned to Saudi Arabia for a month, where he applied to re-enter the United States through the Visa Express program, indicating that he intended to stay at a Marriott hotel in New York City. On his visa application, al-Mihdhar falsely stated that he had never previously traveled to the United States.

On 4 July, al-Mihdhar returned to the United States, arriving at New York City's John F. Kennedy International Airport, using a new passport obtained the previous month. A digital copy of one of al-Mihdhar's passports was later recovered during a search of an al-Qaeda safe house in Afghanistan, which held indicators, such as fake or altered passport stamps, that al-Mihdhar was a member of a known terrorist group. At the time when al-Mihdhar was admitted to the United States, immigration inspectors had not been trained to look for such indicators. Upon arriving, al-Mihdhar did not check into the Marriott but instead spent a night at another hotel in the city.

Al-Mihdhar bought a fake ID on 10 July from All Services Plus in Passaic County, New Jersey, which was in the business of selling counterfeit documents, including another ID to Flight 11 hijacker Abdulaziz al-Omari. On 1 August, al-Mihdhar and fellow Flight 77 hijacker Hani Hanjour drove to Virginia in order to obtain driver's licenses. Once they arrived, they scouted out a 7-Eleven convenience store and a dollar store in Falls Church, and found two Salvadoran immigrants who, for $50 each, were willing to vouch for al-Mihdhar and Hanjour as being Virginian residents. With notarized residency forms, al-Mihdhar and Hanjour were able to obtain driver's licenses at a Virginian motor vehicle office. Flight 77 hijackers Salem al-Hazmi and Majed Moqed, and United Airlines Flight 93 hijacker Ziad Jarrah used the same addresses obtained from the Salvadorans to obtain Virginian driver's licenses.

In August 2001, al-Mihdhar and al-Hazmi made several visits to the library at William Paterson University in Wayne, New Jersey, where they used computers to look up travel information and book flights. On 22 August, al-Mihdhar and al-Hazmi tried to purchase flight tickets from the American Airlines online ticket-merchant, but had technical difficulties and gave up. Al-Mihdhar and Moqed were able to make flight reservations for Flight 77 on 25 August, using Moqed's credit card; however, the transaction did not fully go through because the billing address and the shipment address for the tickets did not match.

On 31 August, al-Mihdhar closed an account at Hudson United Bank in New Jersey, having opened the account when he arrived in July, and was with Hanjour when he made a withdrawal from an ATM in Paterson on 1 September. The next day, al-Mihdhar, Moqed, and Hanjour traveled to Maryland, where they stayed at budget motels in Laurel. Al-Mihdhar was among the muscle hijackers who worked out at a Gold's Gym in Greenbelt in early September. On 5 September, al-Mihdhar and Moqed went to the American Airlines ticket counter at Baltimore-Washington International Airport to pick up their tickets for Flight 77, paying $2,300 in cash.

=== Intelligence leads ===
Despite knowledge of his entry into the United States for over a year, al-Mihdhar was not placed on a CIA watchlist until 21 August 2001, and a note was sent on 23 August to the Department of State and the Immigration and Naturalization Service (INS) suggesting that al-Mihdhar and al-Hazmi be added to their watchlists. The Federal Aviation Administration (FAA) was not notified about the two men. On 23 August, the CIA informed the FBI that al-Mihdhar had obtained a U.S. visa in Jeddah. The FBI headquarters received a copy of the Visa Express application from the Jeddah embassy on 24 August, showing the New York Marriott as al-Mihdhar's destination. On 23 August, the Mossad gave al-Mihdhar's name to the CIA as one of 19 belonging to US residents they suspected would imminently attack the country; only four of these names are known publicly, the others belonging to fellow 9/11 hijackers Mohamed Atta, Nawaf al-Hazmi, and Marwan al-Shehhi. It is not known if the list contained the names of all the 9/11 hijackers or if it were only coincidence that the list had as many names as there were hijackers in the 9/11 attacks.

On 28 August, the FBI New York field office requested that a criminal case be opened to determine whether al-Mihdhar was still in the United States, but the request was refused. The FBI ended up treating al-Mihdhar as an intelligence case, which meant that the FBI's criminal investigators could not work on the case, due to the barrier separating intelligence and criminal case operations. An agent in the New York office sent an e-mail to FBI headquarters saying, "Whatever has happened to this, someday someone will die, and the public will not understand why we were not more effective and throwing every resource we had at certain 'problems.'" The reply from headquarters was, "we [at headquarters] are all frustrated with this issue ... [t]hese are the rules. NSLU does not make them up."

The FBI contacted Marriott on 30 August, requesting that they check guest records, and on 5 September, they reported that no Marriott hotels had any record of al-Mihdhar checking in. The day before the attacks, Robert Fuller of the New York office requested that the Los Angeles FBI office check all local Sheraton Hotels, as well as Lufthansa and United Airlines bookings, because those were the two airlines al-Mihdhar had used to enter the country. Neither the Treasury Department's Financial Crimes Enforcement Network nor the FBI's Financial Review Group, which have access to credit card and other private financial records, were notified about al-Mihdhar prior to 11 September.

Regarding the CIA's refusal to inform the FBI about al-Mihdhar and al-Hazmi, author Lawrence Wright suggests the CIA wanted to protect its turf and was concerned about giving sensitive intelligence to FBI Agent John P. O'Neill, whom Alec Station chief Michael Scheuer described as duplicitous. Wright also speculates that the CIA may have been protecting intelligence operations overseas, and might have been eying al-Mihdhar and al-Hazmi as recruitment targets to obtain intelligence on al-Qaeda, although the CIA was not authorized to operate in the United States and might have been leaving them for Saudi intelligence to recruit.

== 9/11 attacks ==
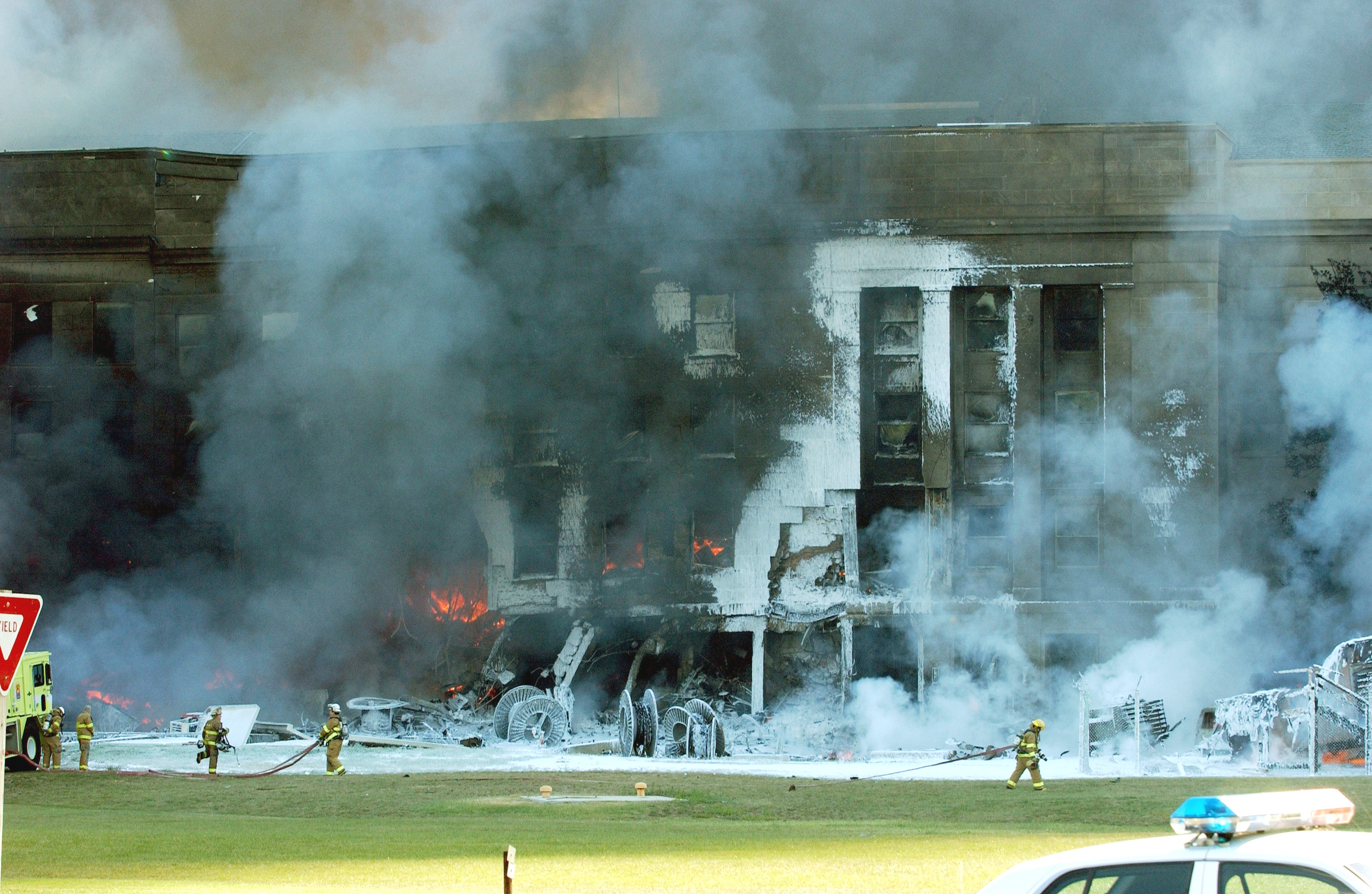
The Pentagon, minutes after American Airlines Flight 77 crashed into it

On 10 September 2001, al-Mihdhar and the other hijackers checked into the Marriott Residence Inn in Herndon, Virginia, near Washington Dulles International Airport. Saleh Ibn Abdul Rahman Hussayen, a prominent Saudi Arabian government official, was staying at the same hotel that night, although there is no evidence that they met or knew of each other's presence.

At 6:22 a.m. on 11 September 2001, the group checked out of the hotel and headed to Dulles airport. At 7:15 a.m., al-Mihdhar and Moqed checked in at the American Airlines ticket counter and arrived at the passenger security checkpoint at 7:20 a.m. Both men set off the metal detector and were put through secondary screening. Security video footage later released shows that Moqed was wanded, but the screener did not identify what set off the alarm, and both Moqed and al-Mihdhar were able to proceed without further hindrance. Al-Mihdhar was also selected by the Computer Assisted Passenger Prescreening System (CAPPS), which involved extra screening of his luggage; however, because al-Mihdhar did not check any luggage, this had no effect. By 7:50 a.m., al-Mihdhar and the other hijackers, carrying knives and box cutters, had made it through the airport security checkpoint and boarded Flight 77 to Los Angeles. Al-Mihdhar was seated in seat 12B, next to Moqed.

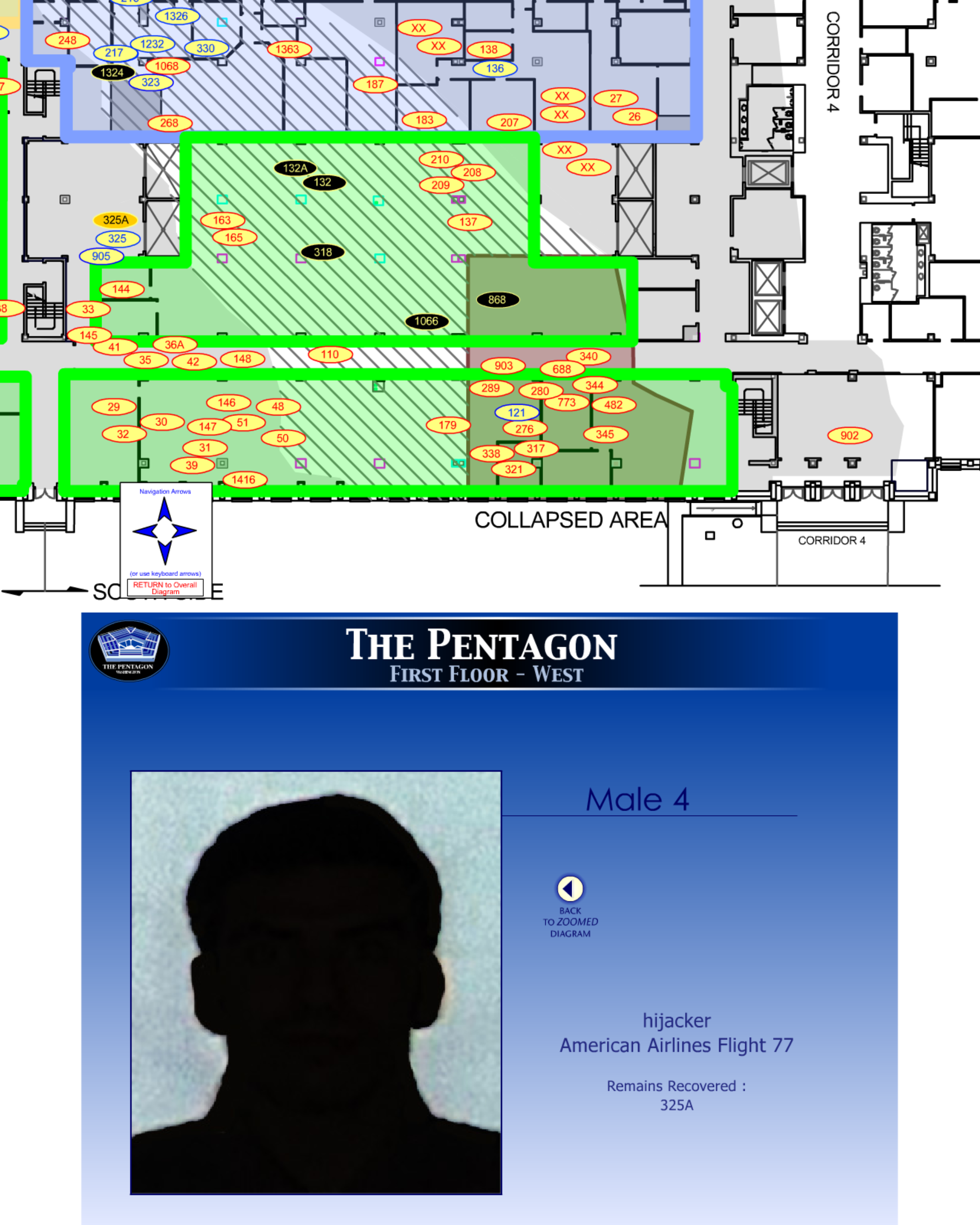
Information about the recovery of al-Mihdhar's remains (325A) from a Moussaoui trial presentation.

The flight was scheduled to depart from Gate D26 at 8:10 a.m. but was delayed by 10 minutes. The last routine radio communication from the plane to air traffic control occurred at 8:50:51 a.m. At 8:54 a.m., Flight 77 deviated from its assigned flight path and began to turn south, at which point the hijackers set the flight's autopilot setting for Washington, D.C. Passenger Barbara Olson called her husband, United States Solicitor General Ted Olson, and reported that the plane had been hijacked. At 9:37:45 a.m, Flight 77 crashed into the west facade of the Pentagon, killing all 64 people aboard, along with 125 in the Pentagon. In the recovery process, remains of the five hijackers were identified through a process of elimination, since their DNA did not match any from the victims, and put into the custody of the FBI.

== Aftermath ==
After the attacks, the identification of al-Mihdhar was one of the first links suggesting that bin Laden had played a role in their organization, since al-Mihdhar had been seen at the Malaysian conference speaking to bin Laden's associates. The FBI interrogated Quso, who was arrested following the USS Cole bombing and in custody in Yemen. Quso was able to identify al-Mihdhar, al-Hazmi and bin Attash in photos provided by the FBI, and he also knew Marwan al-Shehhi, a hijacker aboard United Airlines Flight 175. From Quso, the FBI was able to establish an al-Qaeda link to the attacks.

On 12 September 2001, the Toyota Corolla purchased by al-Mihdhar was found in Dulles International Airport's hourly parking lot. Inside the vehicle, authorities found a letter written by Mohamed Atta, a hijacker aboard American Airlines Flight 11; maps of Washington, D.C. and New York City; a cashier's check made out to a Phoenix, Arizona, flight school; four drawings of a Boeing 757 cockpit; a box cutter; and a page with notes and phone numbers, which contained evidence that led investigators to San Diego.

On 19 September 2001, the Federal Deposit Insurance Corporation (FDIC) distributed a special alert that listed al-Mihdhar as still alive, and other reports began suggesting that a number of the alleged hijackers were likewise still alive. For instance, on 23 September 2001, the BBC published an article that suggested al-Mihdhar and others named as hijackers were still at large. The German magazine Der Spiegel later investigated the BBC's claims of "living" hijackers and reported they were cases of mistaken identities. In 2002, Saudi Arabian officials stated that the names of the hijackers were correct and that 15 of the 19 hijackers were Saudi Arabian. In 2006, in response to 9/11 conspiracy theories surrounding its original news story, the BBC said that confusion had arisen with the common Arabic names, and that its later reports on the hijackers superseded its original story.

In 2005, U.S. Army Lt. Col. Anthony Shaffer and Congressman Curt Weldon alleged that the Defense Department data mining project Able Danger identified al-Mihdhar, al-Hazmi, al-Shehhi, and Atta as members of a Brooklyn-based al-Qaeda cell in early 2000. Shaffer largely based his allegations on the recollections of Navy Captain Scott Phillpott, who later recanted his recollection, telling investigators that he was "convinced that Atta was not on the chart that we had". Phillpott said that Shaffer was "relying on my recollection 100 percent", and the Defense Department Inspector General's report indicated that Philpott strongly supported the social network analysis techniques used in Able Danger, and might have exaggerated claims of identifying the hijackers.

== See also ==
- Hijackers in the September 11 attacks

== Sources ==
- "9/11 Commission Report" (PDF). National Commission on Terrorist Attacks Upon the United States. 2004. Archived (PDF) from the original on 8 September 2012.
- "9/11 and Terror Travel: Appendix" (PDF). National Commission on Terrorist Attacks Upon the United States. 2004. Archived (PDF) from the original on 5 October 2008.
- Aust, Stefan; Der Spiegel Magazine (2002). Inside 9-11: What Really Happened. Schnibben, Cordt. MacMillan. ISBN 0-312-98748-X.
- Burke, Jason (2004). Al-Qaeda: The True Story of Radical Islam. I.B. Tauris. ISBN 1-85043-666-5.
- Federal Bureau of Investigation (4 February 2008). "Hijackers' Timeline" (PDF). NEFA Foundation. Archived from the original (PDF) on 12 October 2008.
- Fouda, Yosri; Fielding, Nick (2003). Masterminds of Terror: The Truth Behind the Most Devastating Terrorist Attack the World Has Ever Seen. Arcade. ISBN 1-55970-708-9.
- McDermott, Terry (2005). Perfect Soldiers: The Hijackers: Who They Were, Why They Did It. HarperCollins. ISBN 0-06-058469-6.
- Smith, Paul J. (2005). Terrorism and Violence in Southeast Asia: Transnational Challenges to States and Regional Stability. M.E. Sharpe. ISBN 0-7656-1433-2.
- Wright, Lawrence (2006). The Looming Tower: Al Qaeda and the Road to 9/11. Alfred A. Knopf. ISBN 0-375-41486-X.
