= Abu Bara al Yemeni =

Yemeni attempted plane hijacker

- Other names: Zuhail Abdo Anam Said al Sharabi; Abu al Bara al Taizi; Abu Bara al-Taizi; Abu Suhaib al Taize; Suhail Shurabi; Barakat
- Known for: Was originally to have been one of the hijackers in the September 11 attacks

According to the 9/11 Commission Report, Abu Bara al Yemeni was a citizen of Yemen who was slated to participate in al Qaeda's attacks on the United States on September 11, 2001. Abu Bara al Yemeni did not end up participating in the attacks, because he was not able to get a U.S. travel visa.

In April 2011, the whistleblower organization WikiLeaks published formerly secret Joint Task Force Guantanamo detainee assessments. The assessment for Abd al-Rahman Abdu Abu Aghayth Sulayman listed his stay in a Kandahar guesthouse operated by Abu Suhaib al Taize, as a justification for his detention. The assessment said "Abu Suhaib al Taize" was an alias for Abu Bara al-Taizi, whose real name was Zuhail Abdo Anam Said al Sharabi.
