= Konsojaya Trading Company =

Shell company based in Malaysia

- Type: Shell company
- Industry: Import/export
- Founded: June 1994
- Founder: Riduan Isamuddin and Noralwizah Lee Abdullah
- Defunct: Unknown
- Fate: Defunct
- Headquarters: Kuala Lumpur, Malaysia
- Area served: Asia/Pacific region, Afghanistan, Saudi Arabia, Bahrain, Sudan
- Key people: Wali Khan Amin Shah; Mehdat Abdul Salam Shabana; Hemeid H. Algamdi; Amein Mohamed
- Products: Palm oil, Sudanese honey
- Revenue: Unknown
- Number of employees: Unknown

The Konsojaya Trading Company was a shell company cofounded by Jemaah Islamiyah leader Riduan Isamuddin, better known as "Hambali", and his Malaysian Chinese wife, Noralwizah Lee Abdullah in June 1994. The company was based in Kuala Lumpur, Malaysia.

An Afghan named Wali Khan Amin Shah was on the board of directors of the company. He also owned half (3,000) of the company's 6,000 shares. Another member of the board of directors was Afghan Mehdat Abdul Salam Shabana, who owned the other half of the company's shares. Another member was 30-year-old Hemeid H. Algamdi, a citizen of Jeddah, Saudi Arabia. Yemeni Amein Mohamed was the managing director of Konsojaya. A company profile that was circulated to suppliers and customers stated that he was the former marketing director of a Pakistan-based supplying agent for a company in Jeddah.

Konsojaya stated in its incorporation papers that it was an "import/export" company that shipped palm oil to Afghanistan from Malaysia. The organisation also dealt with the export of Sudanese honey. Its "principal objective" was to import and export products found in the Asia/Pacific region (East Asia, Southeast Asia, and Oceania) to Afghanistan, Saudi Arabia, Bahrain, and Sudan.

A man named Khalid Shaikh Mohammed, who was staying in Manila, Philippines, often travelled to several places, including Brazil, to promote Konsojaya.

Konsojaya actually funneled money and material assistance to several regional militant Islamic plots. The organisation also funneled money to an account owned by Omar Abu Omar, an employee of the International Relations and Information Centre, an organisation run by Mohammed Jamal Khalifa, who was married to one of Osama bin Laden's sisters. The money would then be siphoned into an account under the name of "Adam Salih", an alias of Ramzi Yousef, who was at the time planning Manila-based Operation Bojinka, an attack that would have destroyed eleven airliners.

Manila police discovered Operation Bojinka after an apartment fire led police to a suspect on January 6 and the morning of January 7, 1995.

According to corporate records in Kuala Lumpur, Konsojaya no longer exists.
