= Riduan Isamuddin =

Indonesian Islamist militant imprisoned by the US (born 1964)

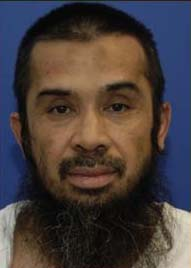
- Isamuddin in 2008
- Born: Encep Nurjaman; April 4, 1964 (age 62); Cianjur, West Java, Indonesia
- Arrested: August 11, 2003; Ayutthaya, Thailand
- Detained at: CIA black sites, Guantanamo
- Other name: Hambali Nurjaman Hambali Encep Nurjaman
- ISN: 10019
- Alleged to be a member of: Al-Qaeda; Jemaah Islamiyah
- Charge: Charged before a military commission in 2021

Riduan Isamuddin, (Note: Also transliterated as Riduan Isamudin, Riduan Isomuddin, and Riduan Isomudin.) also known by the nom de guerre Hambali (born April 4, 1964), is the former military leader of the Indonesian terrorist organization Jemaah Islamiyah (JI). He is currently in American custody at Guantanamo Bay detainment camp in Cuba. He is currently awaiting trial in a military commission.

Hambali was often described as "the Osama bin Laden of Southeast Asia". Some media reports describe him as bin Laden's lieutenant for Southeast Asian operations. Other reports describe him as an independent peer. He was highly trusted by al-Qaeda and was the main link between the two organisations. Hambali was a close friend of Khalid Sheikh Mohammed, who planned the Bojinka plot and the September 11 attacks. Hambali envisioned creating a Muslim state, in the form of an Islamic superpower (a theocracy) across Southeast Asia, with himself as its leader (Caliph). His ambition was to rule Indonesia, Malaysia, Singapore, Brunei and parts of the Philippines, Myanmar, and Thailand.

He received increasing attention in the aftermath of the 2002 Bali bombings, in which 202 people died. He was eventually apprehended in a joint operation by the CIA and Thai police in 2003. He is currently imprisoned in Guantanamo Bay detention camp in Cuba, after three years of CIA custody in a secret location.

== Early life ==
Riduan Isamuddin was born Encep Nurjaman in the rice belt of Sukamanah, a small village in Cianjur Regency, in the province of West Java, Indonesia. He was the son of a peasant farmer, and was the second of thirteen children. He first became involved with Jemaah Islamiyah as a teenager. He was a diligent student at his Islamic high school, Al-Ianah. He travelled to Afghanistan in 1983 to fight the Soviet Union during the Soviet–Afghan War. During his three years as a mujahid, from 1987 to 1990, he met Osama bin Laden. Friends and family in Indonesia say they did not know of his activities overseas.

His name has been transliterated into English text in several different ways over the years, including;

- His name was spelled Hambali, Riduan bin Isomuddin on the Summary of Evidence memo prepared for his Combatant Status Review.
- His name was spelled Ryuduan bin Isomuddin by Scott McClellan during a press briefing. McClellan spelled his name letter by letter.
- His name is spelled Riduan Isamuddin in the report of the 9/11 Commission.
- His name was spelled Nurjaman Riduan Isamuddin by the U.S. Treasury.

== Jemaah Islamiyah ==
In 1991, Nurjaman returned to Cianjur for one week, before going to Malaysia, where he met the two co-founders of JI, Abdullah Sungkar and Abubakar Bashir. The three lived in a housing compound in Kampung Sungai Manggis, Banting, Selangor. Nurjaman internationalized the terrorist group's activities and took on a new name in his permanent residence permit: Riduan Isamuddin. His nickname, Hambali, is an allusion to Hanbali, an Islamic school of jurisprudence.

The two co-founders sent their students to "study" in Afghanistan and Pakistan. The students actually fought the Soviets until the Soviets pulled out of Afghanistan. A woman named Noralwizah Lee Abdullah had gone to Malaysia for religious schooling. She secretly married Isamuddin after meeting him at the Luqmanul Hakiem School in Ulu Tiram, Johor. The school was founded by Sungkar and Bashir.

Initially, Isamuddin struggled to make a living for his family. He switched from selling kebabs to patenting medicines. He soon disappeared from his home for weeks at a time, and he received many visitors at home. He eventually came to own a red hatchback and several cell phones. Investigators say that many calls on those cell phones were made to Mohammed Jamal Khalifa, Osama bin Laden's brother in law, who had arrived back in Manila, Philippines in 1991.

After Arab visitors gave his family much money, he founded a shell company, Konsojaya, in June 1994. Ostensibly an import-export company trading in palm oil between Malaysia and Afghanistan, it was essentially a front company for terrorism. Wali Khan Amin Shah, who would become the financier of Operation Bojinka, was a director of Konsojaya. The company provided financial assistance to the project until it was discovered by investigators on a laptop computer after an apartment fire on January 6, 1995. Shah was arrested in the Philippines but escaped on a short order. Shah was arrested in Malaysia in December 1995. Both Shah and mastermind Ramzi Yousef, who escaped the Philippines but was arrested in Lahore, Pakistan, were extradited to the United States. They were both convicted and sentenced to life in prison for participating in the project.

== Hambali goes underground ==
Hambali's company attracted attention of investigators so his dealings went quiet for a while. He decided to preach, raise money, and recruit for his cause. He went underground in 2000 and started a wave of church-bombings in Indonesia. He always had a "hands-on" technique; he met his foot soldiers and came to them "with detailed plans, plenty of cash and two of his own bombmakers." He always fled before the bombing commenced. Meanwhile, the spiritual leader of Jemaah Islamiyah, Abu Bakr Bashir, was preaching jihad at his schools while denying links to Islamic militants.

Hambali planned and attended the January 2000 Al Qaeda Summit in Kuala Lumpur, Malaysia. Among the others present were two 9/11 hijackers, Khalid al-Mihdhar and Nawaf al-Hazmi. This gathering in Kuala Lumpur was observed by the CIA and Malaysian authorities, but what specifically was being said at the meetings was not picked up. Hambali also provided money and documents to Zacarias Moussaoui in October of that year. However claims by Singaporean security analyst Rohan Gunaratna that he had flown to Australia were dismissed by Australian authorities.

After the 2002 Bali bombings, in which 202 people were killed, Hambali received more attention from the United States. In the years leading up to the attack, the Indonesian government's action against Islamic militants had been minimal. Following the attack, Abu Bakr Bashir was arrested as part of a crack down on Jemaah Islamiyah. He was wanted in Indonesia for the bombings of several churches in the region, and wanted for the Bali bombings and a failed plot on several targets in Singapore.

== Capture ==
Hambali used a series of safe-houses throughout Southeast Asia, especially Thailand and Cambodia, to move around. While he was in Ayutthaya, Thailand, 75 kilometres north of Bangkok, he was planning a terrorist attack against several Thai hotels and the Asia Pacific Economic Cooperation summit (APEC) in Bangkok in October 2003. Hambali had used a false Spanish passport to enter Thailand while his wife used her Malaysian passport.

Thai police found him as part of a joint operation between the Thai police and the CIA on August 11, 2003. The twenty uniformed and undercover police smashed down the door to his one bedroom apartment in Ayutthaya, and arrested him and 33-year-old Noralwizah Lee Abdullah, a Chinese Malaysian who was considered to be his wife. Hambali was wearing a pair of jeans, a T-shirt, a baseball cap, and a pair of sunglasses. Police also seized explosives and firearms in the property. It marked the end of a 20-month hunt for Hambali, who was 37 years of age when he was captured.

According to a 2010 Associated Press report, by March 2004 Hambali was being held at a CIA black site in Rabat, Morocco, and by October of that year he had been transferred to a black site in Bucharest, Romania. On September 6, 2006, President George W. Bush confirmed that Hambali was being held by the CIA and revealed that he had been transferred to Guantanamo Bay. His wife is now in Malaysian custody.

On September 8, 2006, Indonesia formally requested access to Hambali to ensure a fair trial.

Hambali is also wanted in the Philippines for the transfer of explosives on Filipino soil in an attempt to transport them to Singapore.

== Detention, interrogation and torture ==
Following his capture the USA would not confirm or deny that he was in their custody. But on September 6, 2006, President George W. Bush acknowledged the existence of covert, overseas CIA interrogation centres (colloquially known as black sites) and announced that 14 high-profile members (al Qaeda and other related groups) had been transported from those sites to Guantanamo Bay. Those 14 include Hambali and an alleged lieutenant of his called Mohammed Nazir Bin Lep alias Lillie or Li-Li.

On August 11, 2003, the United States government subjected Hambali to almost three years of isolation, interrogation and torture. Within days of his arrest, he was taken to an undisclosed secret detention facility where he was subject to "enhanced interrogation techniques" (EITs) inflicted by the Central Intelligence Agency (CIA) for approximately three years as part of the notorious Rendition, Detention and Interrogation (RDI) program, which is now commonly known as the "Torture Program."

But a complete description of his torture as well as the locations in which it occurred remained classified by the United States government. Only limited amounts of information describing his torture have been released – first from the International Committee of the Red Cross Report on the Treatment of Fourteen 'High-Value Detainees' in CIA Custody dated February 2007 and later by the SSCI Report in 2014.

According to the 2014 Senate Intelligence Committee report, Hambali was told by an interrogator that he would never go to court: "We can never let the world know what I have done to you."

== Combatant Status Review ==
The Bush administration asserted that:

the protections of the Geneva Conventions did not extend to captured prisoners who are not members of the regular Afghan armed force nor meet the criteria for prisoner of war for voluntary forces.

Critics argued the Conventions obliged the U.S. to conduct competent tribunals to determine the status of prisoners. Subsequently, the U.S. Department of Defense instituted Combatant Status Review Tribunals (CSRTs), to determine whether detainees met the new definition of an "enemy combatant".

"Enemy combatant" was defined by the U.S. Department of Defense as:

an individual who was part of, or supporting, the Taliban, or al-Qaeda forces, or associated forces that are engaged in hostilities against the United States or its coalition partners. This includes any person who commits a belligerent act or has directly supported hostilities in aid of enemy armed forces.

The CSRTs are not bound by the rules of evidence that would normally apply in civilian court, and the government's evidence is presumed to be “genuine and accurate.” From July 2004 through March 2005, CSRTs were convened to determine whether each prisoner had been correctly classified as an "enemy combatant".

Riduan Isamuddin was among the 60% of prisoners who chose to participate in tribunal hearings. A Summary of Evidence memo was prepared for the tribunal of each detainee, listing the allegations that supported their detention as an "enemy combatant".

Riduan Isamuddin's memo accused him of the following:

The Department of Defense announced on August 9, 2007, that all fourteen of the "high-value detainees" who had been transferred to Guantanamo from the CIA's black sites, had been officially classified as "enemy combatants". Although judges Peter Brownback and Keith J. Allred had ruled two months earlier that only "illegal enemy combatants" could face military commissions, the Department of Defense waived the qualifier and said that all fourteen men could now face charges before Guantanamo military commissions.

== Possible transfer to Washington, D.C. for a civilian trial ==
According to Xinhua, the state-owned newspaper of the Chinese Communist Party, the Department of Justice was considering transferring Riduan Isamuddin to Washington, D.C. for a civilian trial.

== Joint Review Task Force ==
When he assumed office in January 2009, President Barack Obama made a number of promises about the future of Guantanamo. He promised the use of torture would cease at the camp. He promised to institute a new review system. That new review system was composed of officials from six departments, where the OARDEC reviews were conducted entirely by the Department of Defense. When it reported back, a year later, the Joint Review Task Force classified some individuals as too dangerous to be transferred from Guantanamo, even though there was no evidence to justify laying charges against them. On April 9, 2013, that document was made public after a Freedom of Information Act request. Riduan Isamuddin was one of the 71 individuals deemed too innocent to charge, but too dangerous to release. Although Obama promised that those deemed too innocent to charge, but too dangerous to release would start to receive reviews from a Periodic Review Board as less than a quarter of men have received a review. Isamuddin was denied approval for transfer on September 19, 2016.

== In popular culture ==
- Modernine TV discussed Hambali on TimeLine, 30 December 2018, in "Black Magic Operations".
- Hambali is portrayed by Indonesian actor/singer Surya Saputra in the movie Long Road to Heaven.
