= International Islamic Relief Organization =

Saudi Arabian charity

International Organization for Relief, Welfare and Development
- Abbreviation: IIRO, IIROSA, egatha, welfare
- Formation: 1978
- Type: International Charitable Organization
- Headquarters: Jeddah
- Location: Saudi Arabia
- Region served: Worldwide
- Members: ECOSOC
- General Secretary: Dr. Abdulaziz Ahmed Sarhan
- President: Muhammad Al-Issa
- Main organ: General Assembly, General Secretariat
- Parent organization: Muslim World League
- Affiliations: ECOSOC, IOM, ICVA, UNRWA, IICDR, OIC – See
- Website: egatha.org
- Remarks: International Islamic Relief Organization is not to be confused with Islamic Relief – UK (IR-UK), an English NGO with offices in about 15 different countries.
- Formerly called: International Islamic Relief Organization

International Organization for Relief, Welfare and Development (Welfare; Arabic: الهيئة العالمية للإغاثة والرعاية والتنمية), formerly known as the International Islamic Relief Organization or International Islamic Relief Organization of Saudi Arabia (IIROSA), is a charity based in Saudi Arabia founded by the Muslim World League in 1978. It is a full member of The Conference of NGOs, where it serves on the board. The IIRO is included in a list of some of the UNHCR's major NGO partners and has been involved in many joint programmes with UN Agencies and intergovernmental (such as the World Health Organization) and non-governmental organisations. It has enjoyed consultative status on the United Nations Economic and Social Council since 1995. It was the first Islamic NGO to gain observer status with the International Organisation for Migration (IOM). It used also to be a member of the International Humanitarian City based in Dubai, UAE.

Following the 9/11 terror attacks, it was alleged that one of Osama bin-Laden's brothers-in-law had utilised the IIRO Philippines and Indonesian branches to work with terrorist organizations worldwide, and that a brother of Al-Qaeda official Ayman al Zawahiri working for the IIRO in Albania had brought a number of members of the terror group Egyptian Islamic Jihad to work for IIRO in that European country. IIRO denies any wrongdoing.

== History ==
Welfare is an affiliate of the Muslim World League (MWL). A Saudi royal decree issued on January 29, 1979, approved the decision of MWL to form Welfare made in 1978.

It is a member of the International Islamic Council for Da'wah and Relief (IICDR), has observer status at Organisation of the Islamic Cooperation, consultative status at United Nations Economic and Social Council (ECOSOC) and links to Islamic Educational, Scientific and Cultural Organization (ISESCO) among many others.

IIRO maintains a website in both Arabic and English.

== Activities ==
In 2003 and 2004, approximately US$36 million was spent on 2258 projects involving 4,586,085 recipients in 81 countries. IIROSA's seven main programs received:

- Social Welfare: US$13 million.
- Engineering Department: About US$7 million.
- Society Development and Seasonal Projects: About US$6 million.
- Emergency Relief: About US$4 million.
- Health Care: US$2 million.
- Educational Care: US$2 million.
- Qur'an Memorization: US$1 million.

IIRO worked in shared projects with the World Health Organization, the United Nations International Children's Emergency Fund, the United Nations High Commission for Refugees and the World Food Program.

- IIRO provided assistance to the victims of 2005 earthquake in the affected areas and regions of Pakistan which were virtually isolated and inaccessible.

In 2012/2013 approximately SAR 127 million riyals was spent on 1,294 projects which benefited 7,056,349 individuals in 58 countries. IIROSA's seven main programs received:

- Emergency Relief Program: SAR 54.5 million riyals.
- Community Development & Seasonal Projects Program: SAR 25 million riyals.
- Educational Welfare Program: SAR 12.4 million riyals.
- Social Welfare Program: SAR 11.8 million riyals
- Engineering Department: SAR 9.9 million riyals.
- Health Care Program: SAR 7.8 million riyals.
- Holy Qur'an and Da'wa Program: SAR 4 million riyals.

IIRO activities during this period were based in 58 countries, as follows:

=== Countries of activities ===
Middle Eastern and Asian Countries: Saudi Arabia, Azerbaijan, Kyrgyzstan, Jordan, Syria, Palestine, Afghanistan, United Arab Emirates, Indonesia, Pakistan, Nepal, India, Bangladesh, Thailand, Sri Lanka, Philippines, China, Iraq, Lebanon and Yemen. African Countries: Uganda, Chad, Tanzania, Comoros, South Africa, Lesotho, South Sudan, Mozambique, Niger, Benin, Djibouti, Senegal, Cote d'Ivoire, Burkina Faso, Burundi, Guinea Bissau, Guinea Conakry, Cameroon, Sudan, Ethiopia, Eritrea, Somalia, Togo, Gambia, Ghana Kenya, Mali, Egypt, Mauritania and Nigeria. European Countries: Germany, Switzerland, Albania, Bulgaria, Bosnia-Herzegovina, Kosova and Macedonia. South American Countries: Brazil.

== Controversy ==
=== Southeast Asia ===
In the wake of the 9/11 destruction of the World Trade Centre twin towers, it was alleged that one of Osama bin-Laden's brothers-in-law (Mohammed Jamal Khalifa who was subsequently murdered in Madagascar in 2007) utilised the IIRO Philippines and Indonesian Branches to work with terrorist organizations in the Philippines, Indonesia and elsewhere. Khalifa came to the Philippines in 1987 or 1988 as the first head of the Philippine branch of IIRO. He was also the IIRO's Southeast Asia regional director. According to researcher Zachary Abuza, Khalifa established several charities and Islamic organizations in the Philippines ostensibly for charity and religious work but which channeled money to extremist groups. According to the Philippines National Security Advisor, Roilo Golez, Khalifa "built up the good will of the community through charity and then turned segments of the population into agents."

Amongst other organizations, Khalifa established the "International Relations and Information Center", which served as the "primary funding mechanism" for the "Bojinka plan" of Khalid Sheikh Mohammed and Ramzi Yousef to assassinate Pope John Paul II and blow up eleven American jetliners (killing some 4000 passengers and bringing air travel to a standstill) in early 1995. (The plan was aborted after a chemical fire drew the Philippine National Police's (PNP) attention on January 6–7, 1995.) A Philippines intelligence report claimed that while the IIRO "claims to be a relief institution" it "is being utilized by foreign extremists as a pipeline through which funding for the local extremists" travels. A defector from the Abu Sayyaf terror group told authorities, "the IIRO was behind the construction of mosques, school buildings and other livelihood projects", but only "in areas penetrated, highly influenced and controlled by the Abu Sayyaf." According to the defector, "only 10 to 30% of the foreign funding goes to the legitimate relief and livelihood projects and the rest go to terrorist operations." According to Abuza, while Philippine government claimed to have shut down all the charities run by Khalifa to finance Abu Sayyaf, a senior Philippine intelligence official complained to him that, "we could not touch the IIRO." The IIRO stayed open until it was taken over by another Islamic charity, the Islamic Wisdom Worldwide Mission in 1995. According to Abuza, "intense diplomatic pressure" from Saudi Arabia kept the charity open. "Their most important source of leverage was the visas and jobs for several hundred thousand Filipino guest workers."

On August 3, 2006, the U.S. Treasury Department designated the Philippines and Indonesian branch offices of IIRO as terrorist entities. Consequently, in August 2006 the United Nations Security Council listed IIRO's branch offices in Indonesia and the Philippines as belonging to or associated with al-Qaeda – and then after a petition had been made to the UN Ombudsperson, delisted them in 2014. Subsequently, the Philippines and Indonesian branch offices of IIRO were delisted by the US Treasury Department on the 16 August 2016.

At the National Commission on Terrorist Attacks upon the United States, Steven Emerson, identified IIRO as a major radical Islamic institution, in part, "responsible for fueling Islamic militancy around the world", and, Rohan Gunaratna, Institute for Defense and Strategic Studies, Singapore, stated, "... Mohammed Jamal Khalifa is the brother-in-law of Osama bin Laden. He arrived in the Philippines in 1988 and he became the founding director of the International Islamic Relief Organization of Saudi Arabia. He used the IIRO to funnel al Qaeda funds to the Abu Sayyaf group and the Moro Islamic Liberation Front."

As well as being designated by the US Treasury in 2006, the Philippines and Indonesian branches of IIRO were also included in the UN list maintained by United Nations Security Council Committee 1267 – which subsequently delisted them in 2014. The Philippines and Indonesian branch offices of IIRO were also delisted by the US Treasury Department on the 16 August 2016.

Neither the Philippines nor the Indonesian branch offices of IIRO have ever been prosecuted by the Philippines or Indonesian authorities.

=== Albania ===
Another country where IIRO is alleged to have aided and abetted bringing in foreign terrorists was the former Communist country of Albania. In 1992, with the support of the government of Sali Berisha "turned to Saudi Arabia for financial support". Among the thirty Islamic NGOs and Islamic associations worked toward re-Islamization Albania was the IIRO. Muhammad al Zawahiri, (the brother of Ayman al Zawahiri, the leader of the Egyptian Islamic Jihad movement and Osama bin Laden's key lieutenant) as an accountant for the International Islamic Relief Organization (IIRO). In addition to helping with relief and spreading correct Islam, IIRO was secretly helping other members of Islamic Jihad find jobs within "charitable organizations building mosques, orphanages and clinics" in Albania. They included the architect Muhammad Hassan Tita, who was assigning him collecting 20% of the salaries earned by Islamic Jihad members employed by NGOs. By the mid-1980s, there were 13 members of Islamic Jihad in Albania's capital Tirana. Shawki Salama Attiya, a former instructor in Afghan camps in the 1980s, who specialized in false identity documents came to Albania under the pseudonym of Majed Mustafa, and Ahmed Osman Saleh, who was wanted by the Egyptian authorities on suspicion of involvement in the attempted assassination of Egypt's Prime minister Atef Sidiqi in 1993. This conspiracy was later exposed during an investigation carried out by the American and Albanian secret services, and several Egyptian Islamist accused of terrorist activities were arrested in 1998, particularly after the 1998 United States embassy bombings.

=== Responses from IIRO ===
IIRO has always denied that it, or any of its branch offices, has ever supported in any manner, and whether directly or indirectly, Al Qaida or any terrorist group.

The accuracy, reliability and veracity of the allegations particularly the role of Mohammed Jamal Khalifa, has always been strongly disputed by IIRO, especially since IIRO was in fact founded in Saudi Arabia in 1978, 10 years before Mohammed Jamal Khalifa is alleged to have been one of its founding directors in the Philippines. In addition, IIRO had closed its Philippines branch in 2004, more than two years before it was designated. Although Mohammed Jamal Khalifa was an employee of IIRO between 1991 and 1993, he was never a director of IIRO. More than 10 years after he ceased to be employed by IIRO, Mohammed Jamal Khalifa was dismissed from the 9/11 lawsuits by the US district court. He was murdered in Madagascar in 2007.

It has also been alleged that Abd al Hamid Sulaiman Muhammed al-Mujil, who was the regional manager of the eastern office of IIRO in Saudi Arabia between 1986 and 2006 was involved in financing terrorism via both the Philippines and the Indonesian branches of IIRO. The accuracy, reliability and veracity of this accusations has always been strongly denied both by IIRO and by Abd al Hamid Sulaiman Muhammed al-Mujil – who after presenting a petition to the UN Ombudsperson was removed from the UN Security Council Al-Qaida Sanctions Committee's Sanctions List on July 1, 2013, more than 6 years after he had ceased to be employed by IIRO.

IIRO has always maintained that it has only ever been solely concerned with providing humanitarian aid wherever it is most needed irrespective of ethnic background, nationality, social status or belief.

=== De-listing from suspected terror list ===
In 2009, IIRO petitioned the Security Council for removal of these two branches from the list in January 2010, and as a result on January 6, 2014, the Security Council Committee removed the IIRO offices in Indonesia and the Philippines from this Al-Qaida Sanctions List after concluding its consideration of the delisting requests for these names submitted through the Office of the UN Ombudsperson established pursuant to Security Council resolution 1904 (2009), and after considering the Comprehensive Reports of the Ombudsperson on these delisting requests. As a result of the UN delisting, the EU also delisted the Indonesia and Philippines Branch Offices of IIRO. and the United Kingdom HM Treasury Financial Sanctions Notice (dated January 14, 2014) confirmed the deletion of IIRO Philippines and Indonesia branches from its consolidated list of persons and entities having a connection with Al-Qaida.

None of the member states represented on the Committee appears to have objected to the de-listing.

Subsequently, the Philippines and Indonesian branch offices of IIRO were delisted by the US Treasury Department on August 16, 2016.

== Current status ==
In 2014 The International Organization for Relief, Welfare and Development "formerly the International Islamic Relief Organization (IIROSA)" signed a memorandum of understanding with United Nations Relief and Works Agency (UNRWA) to establish a mutual cooperation framework to provide assistance to Palestinian refugees. Remarking on the occasion Peter Ford, Representative of the Commissioner-General of UNRWA, said: "We are very pleased to be renewing and intensifying our cooperation with IIROSA, which has a high reputation for professionalism as well as humanitarian concern. We have worked together in the past and will be delighted to breathe new life into our cooperation for the benefit of Palestine refugees who continue to suffer, especially the 2 million living under occupation and the almost half million suffering from the fallout of the Syrian conflict."
