= Casio F-91W =

Digital watch produced since 1989

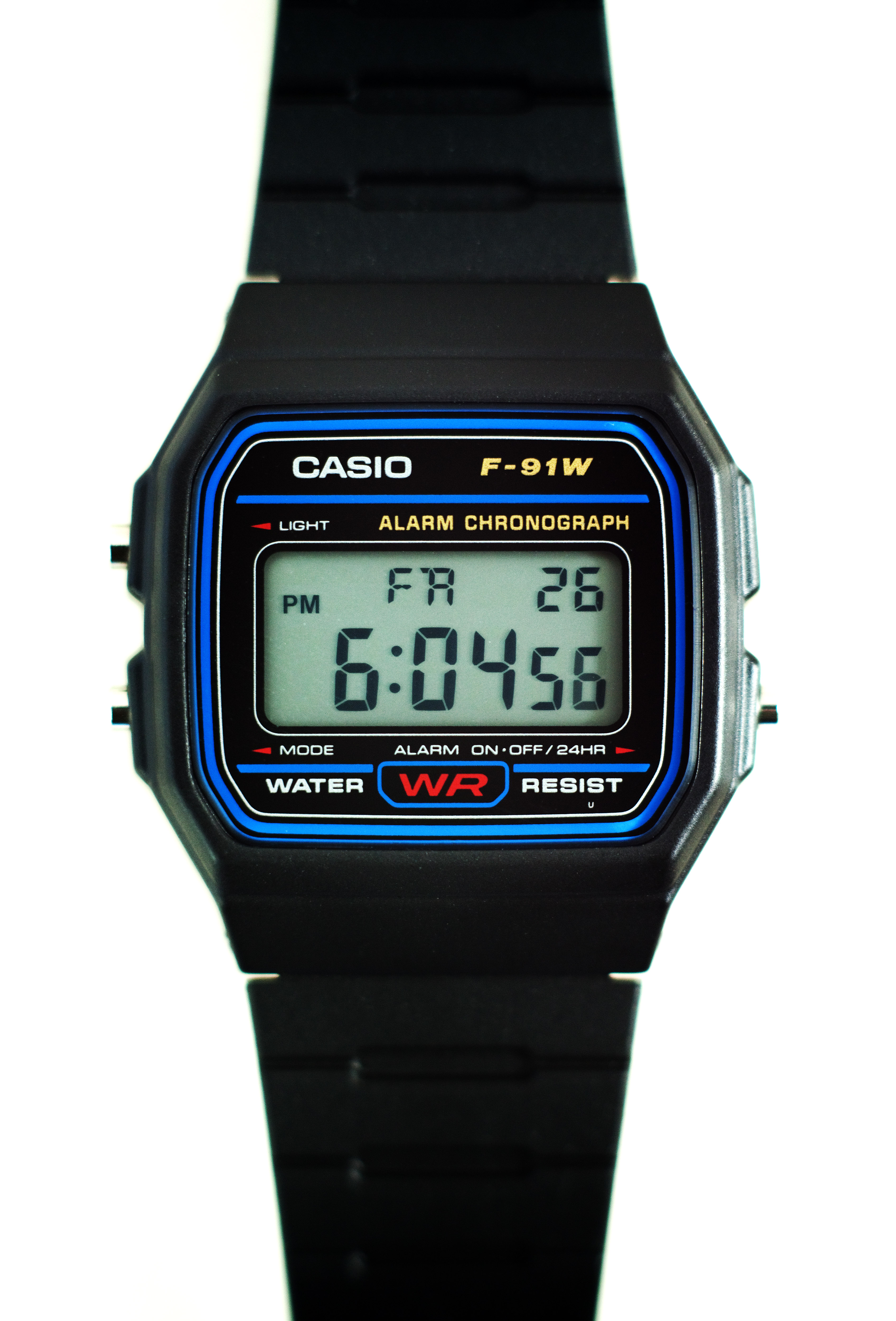
- Casio F-91W-1 watch with a resin case and resin strap
- Manufacturer: Casio
- Type: Quartz
- Display: Digital
- Introduced: June 1989

The Casio F-91W is a digital watch manufactured by Japanese electronics company Casio Computer Co., Ltd. Introduced in June 1989 (Note: The Wikipedia article had previously, since March 2009, reported an incorrect release year of 1991, which was repeated in a BBC article suspected of sourcing the date from Wikipedia (an example of circular reporting). The false release year was finally corrected in 2019, citing an article by KSNV about the error as a source.) as a successor of the F-87W, it is popular for its low price, long battery life, and iconic design. As of 2026, production of the watch was 100 million, which made it the most sold watch in the world.

== Specifications ==
=== Design ===
Designed by Ryūsuke Moriai as his first design for Casio, the case of the F-91W measures 38.2 by 35.2 by 8.5 millimetres (1.50 by 1.39 by 0.33 in). The case is primarily made of resin, with a stainless steel caseback and buttons, with the manufacturer's module number, 593, stamped on the caseback. The resin strap is 18 millimetres (0.71 in) at the fitting and 22 mm across the widest part of the lugs, fitting wrists of 145–200 millimetres (5.7–7.9 in). The total weight is 21 grams (0.74 oz).

=== Features ===
The F-91W has a chronograph, featuring precision of 1/100 seconds with a count up to 59:59.99 (nearly one hour). The chronograph is also able to mark net and split times (i.e., laps). Other features include an hourly time beep, a single daily alarm lasting 20 seconds and an annual calendar. The watch does not make allowances for leap years as there is no provision to record the year. Due to this, the month of February is always counted as 28 days. The watch uses a faint green LED backlight located at the left of the display for illumination (in earlier units it was an amber microlight). According to the manufacturer estimates, the watch is reported to be accurate to ±30 seconds per month.

The quartz movement, designated Module 593, is powered by a single CR2016 3-volt lithium button cell rated to a stated battery life of 7 years.

=== Water resistance ===
The front of the watch is marked "Water Resist". The black version (F91W-1) is "30 meter / 3 bar" (i.e., 100 feet / 44 psi), the ISO standard meaning of which is: "Suitable for everyday use. Splash/rain resistant. NOT suitable for showering, bathing, swimming, snorkeling, water related work and fishing".

== Operation ==
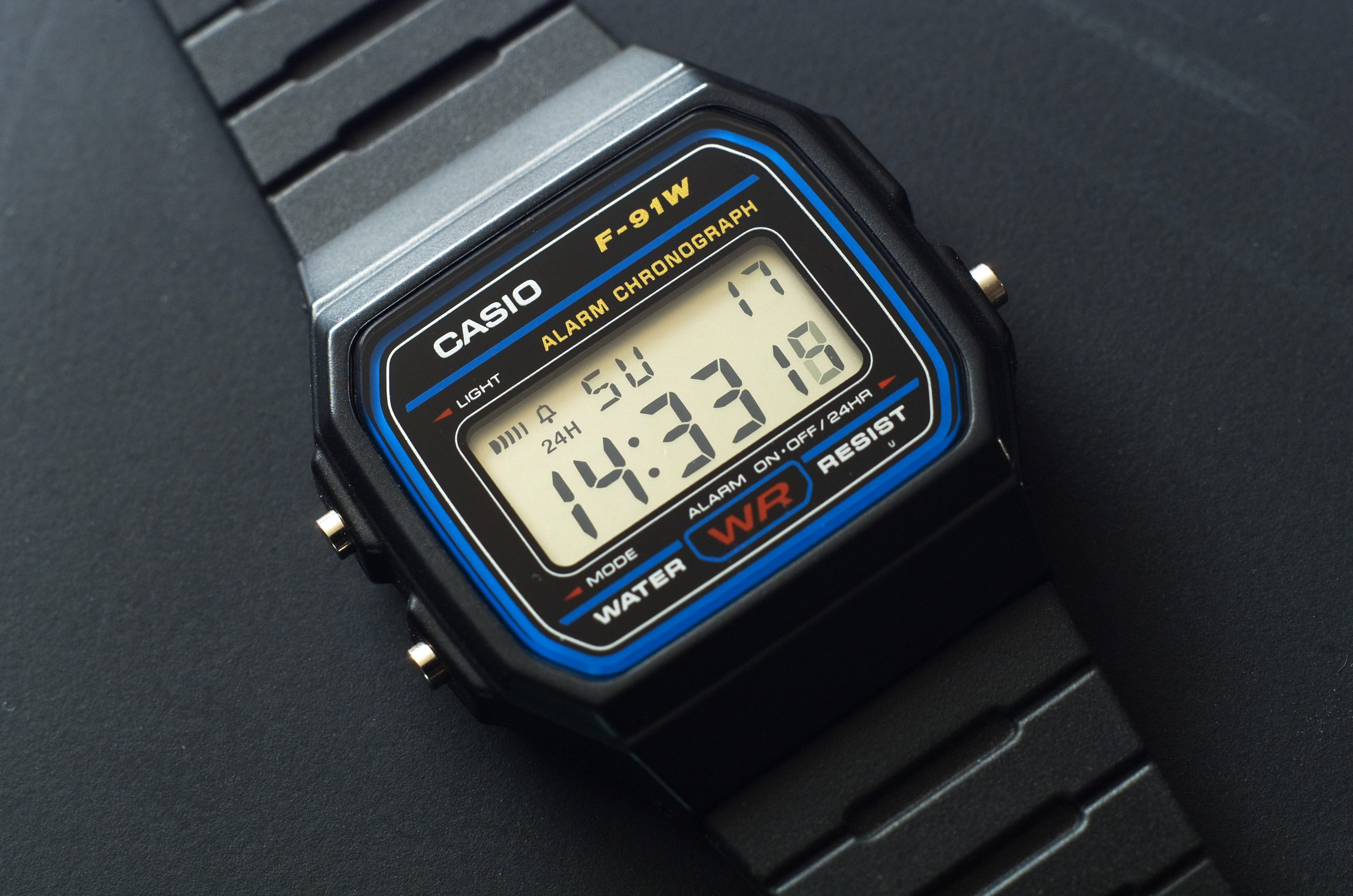
Casio F-91W, in regular timekeeping mode and using the 24-hour display option. The watch is currently set to sound the alarm and hourly chime

The watch is controlled by three side-mounted push-buttons.

- The upper left button, labeled "Light" and designated as "L" in the manual, activates the backlight, cancels the alarm, resets the stopwatch or records a split (lap) time, and is used to navigate settings.
- The lower left button, labeled "Mode" and designated as "C," cycles the modes: time display, alarm, stopwatch, and time/date adjustment.
- The right button, labeled "Alarm On-Off/24hr" and designated as "A," serves as the primary function button: it starts and stops the stopwatch, changes the setting currently being adjusted, or switches between the 12- and 24-hour configurations. These actions depend on what mode the watch is currently in.

The time or date is adjusted by pressing the lower left button three times to bring the watch to time adjustment mode. The top left button is used to cycle through seconds, hours, minutes, month, date, day and normal mode. The right button is used to adjust the flashing value displayed. Unlike any other value, the seconds can only be zeroed. Should this happen before 30 seconds, the watch will zero in at the beginning of the current minute. After 30 seconds it will start the next minute as displayed. When the adjustments are finished, the bottom left button can be pressed once to return the watch to normal mode.

The watch display shows the day of the week, day of the month, hour, minute, seconds and the signs PM in the afternoon – or 24H (24-hour clock) – at all times, the alarm signal status (bar of vertical lines), and the hourly signal status (double beep on the hour, shown as a bell) are present when activated in the alarm mode.

In stopwatch mode, minutes, seconds and hundredths of a second are shown.

== Usage in terrorism ==
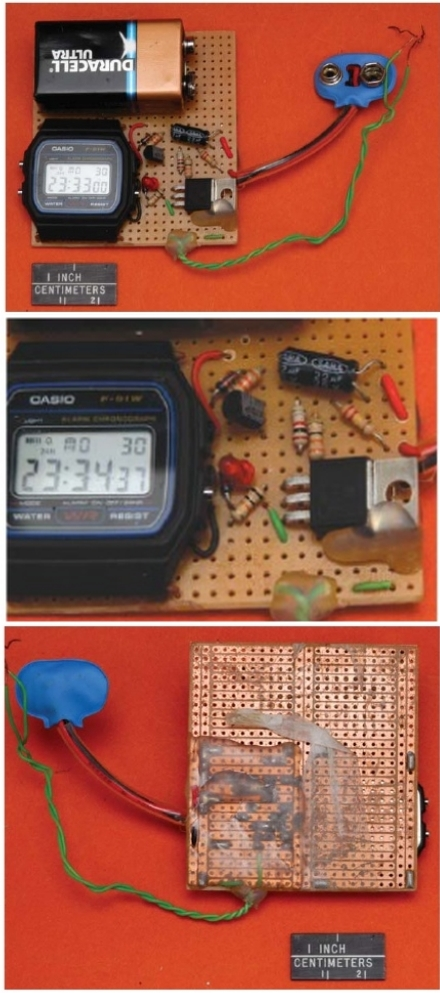
This improvised timer for a time bomb was captured in the early 2000s.

The US government became suspicious of Afghans who wore Casio watches due to their ability to be used as timers for improvised explosive devices, a tactic favored by al-Qaeda.

According to secret documents issued to interrogators at Guantanamo Bay, obtained and released by The Guardian, "the Casio F-91W digital watch was declared to be 'the sign of al-Qaeda' and a contributing factor to continued detention of prisoners by the analysts stationed at Guantanamo Bay. Briefing documents used to train staff in assessing the threat level of new detainees advise that possession of the F-91W and the A159W, available online for as little as £4, suggests the wearer has been trained in bomb making by al-Qaeda in Afghanistan." United States military intelligence officials have identified the F-91W as a watch that terrorists use in constructing time bombs.

This association was highlighted in the Denbeaux study, and may have been used in some cases at Guantanamo Bay. An article published in The Washington Post in 1996 reported that Abdul Hakim Murad, Wali Khan Amin Shah, and Ramzi Ahmed Yousef had developed techniques to use commonly available Casio digital watches to detonate time bombs. Casio watches were mentioned almost 150 times in prisoner assessments from Guantanamo.

On 12 July 2006, the magazine Mother Jones provided excerpts from the transcripts of a selection of the Guantanamo detainees. The article informed readers:

More than a dozen detainees were cited for owning cheap digital watches, particularly "the infamous Casio watch of the type used by Al Qaeda members for bomb detonators".

The article quoted Guantanamo Bay detainee Abdullah Kamel Abdullah Kamel Al Kandari:

When they told me that Casios were used by Al Qaeda and the watch was for explosives, I was shocked ... If I had known that, I would have thrown it away. I'm not stupid. We have four chaplains [at Guantanamo]; all of them wear this watch.

== Variants ==
Model name	Description
F-91W-1xx	Essentially the standard black F-91W-1 model with minor regional differences, usually to do with packaging.: JF (Japan): Standard Japanese market version.; DG (Germany/Europe): Standard European market version; YER (Europe): European version, potentially with a better screen/glass.; XY other international markets.; NB unable to verify on Casio site, info based on Reddit discussions.
F-91W-3, F-91WG-9	Similar to the original F-91W, but including a green and gold trim respectively on the face. Gold variant has gold colored function buttons
F-91-WB series	Simplified case print, print on face and strap: blue-gray on black, bronze on black, white on blue, gray on white.
F-91-WC series	Neon colors for case, face and strap: orange, blue, green, pink, beige and yellow.
F-91-WM series	Metallic colored cases with black straps: grey, army green, blue, silver and gold.
F-91-WS series	Translucent straps with muted case colors: blue, pink, white, and grey
F-84W	Japanese Domestic Market (JDM) model. Uses the same 593 module, but the case design is more similar to the older F-28W and F-87W. It has lugs instead of an embedded strap.
F-94W	Circular icon arrangement in the display.
W-59	Black case with rounded corners and blue accents on the face. Waterproof up to 50 meters.
A158W, A159W, A163W, A164W	Chrome plated case, stainless steel band.
A159WGEA-1	Ion plated gold stainless steel band, gold colored chrome plated case.
F-105W, A168, A168W, A168WG, A168WEGM, A168WEM, W-86	Equipped with electroluminescent backlighting instead of the LED backlight in the other variants. Available in black with a resin strap or in silver or gold colors with a stainless steel bracelet. Slightly different icon arrangement on the display and a thicker case due to the backlight system. Some versions also feature a negative display.
LA680	A smaller variant, marketed towards women

== Counterfeits ==
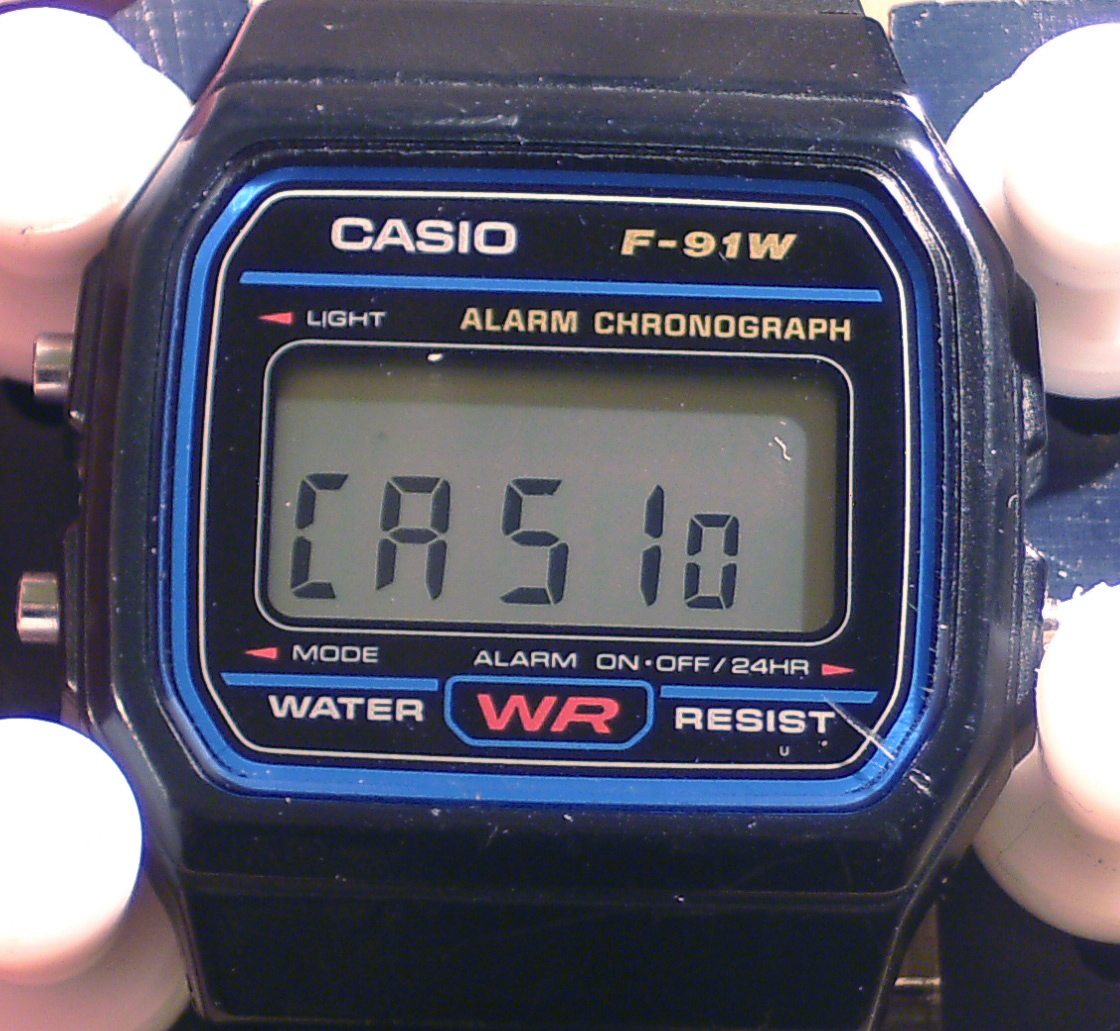
Holding the right button for 3 seconds in the main timekeeping mode leads the display to show "CASIo", which is useful to spot a counterfeit model (applicable for newer models of the F-91W and its variants, including F-94W and A158W)

Despite its low price, counterfeits of the F-91W are very common. These counterfeits usually have lower-quality plastic, narrower LCD viewing angles, louder and higher-pitched beeps, and less accurate timekeeping than genuine models. On newer versions with the green LED light, holding the right button for more than 3 seconds in the main timekeeping mode will make the display show "CASIo" as a quick authenticity check. However, some counterfeit models have been designed to mimic this feature. Another way to check is by pressing all three buttons at once to enter test mode. In some fake modules, an extra dot appears on the display, or, if the extra dot is not there, another indication is if the dot is too far from the letters indicating the day of the week.
