= Bojinka plot =

Terrorist attack planned for January 1995

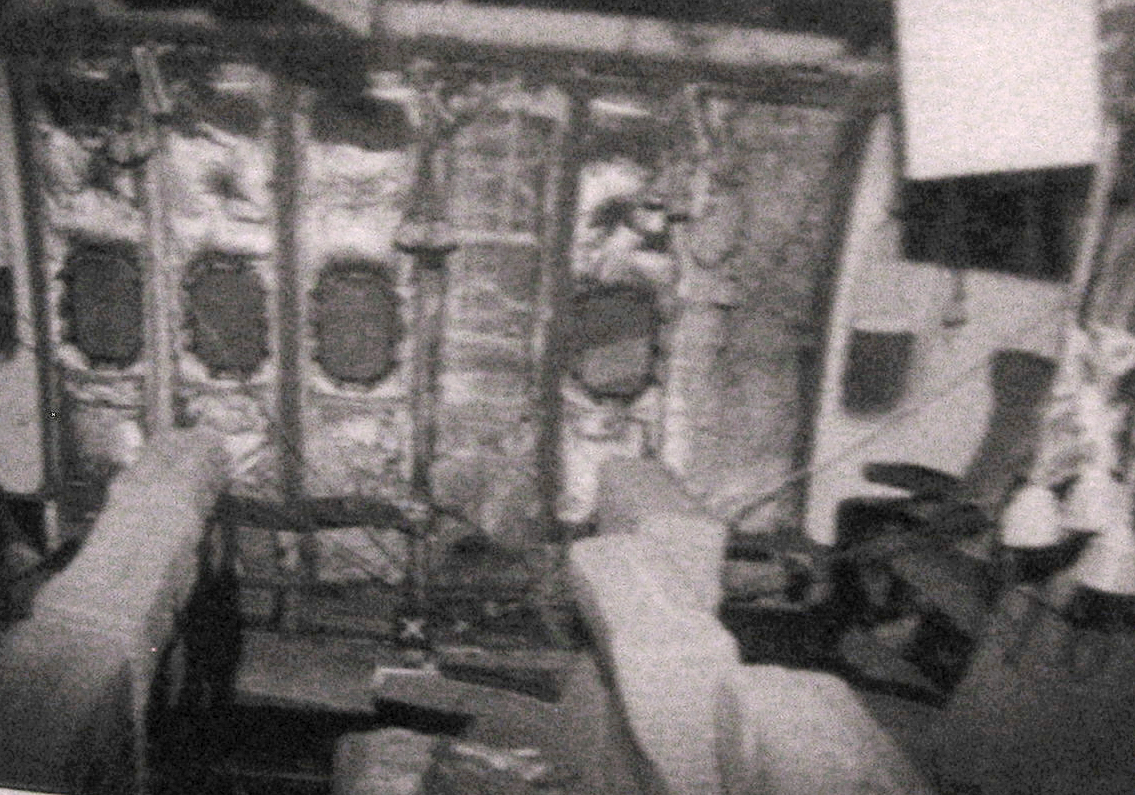
- Aftermath of the fatal Philippine Airlines Flight 434 bombing
- Location: Makati, Philippines (Phase I); Airspace (Phase II); Langley, Virginia, U.S. (Phase III)
- Date: Planned to be executed January 15–22, 1995; foiled on January 6, 1995
- Target: Pope John Paul II (Phase I); American airliners (Phase II); CIA Headquarters (Phase III)
- Attack type: Suicide attack, bombing and aircraft hijacking
- Weapons: Improvised explosive device Cessna aircraft
- Deaths: 1 (test bomb in Philippine Airlines Flight 434)
- Injuries: 10 (test bomb in Philippine Airlines Flight 434)
- Perpetrators: Al-Qaeda and Jemaah Islamiyah
- Motive: Retaliation against U.S. foreign policy; Distraction from the following phases of the plan (assassination of the Pope)
- Accused: Khalid Sheikh Mohammed
- Convicted: Ramzi Yousef; Abdul Hakim Murad; Wali Khan Amin Shah

The Bojinka plot (/boʊˈdʒɪŋkə/ boh-JING-kə; Arabic: بوجينكا) was a failed large-scale, three-phase terrorist attack planned by Ramzi Yousef and Khalid Sheikh Mohammed for January 1995. They intended to assassinate Pope John Paul II; blow up 11 airliners in flight from Asia to the United States, with the goal of killing approximately 4,000 passengers and shutting down air travel around the world; and crash a plane into the headquarters of the United States Central Intelligence Agency (CIA) in Langley, Virginia.

Despite careful planning, the Bojinka plot was disrupted after a chemical fire drew the attention of the Philippine National Police on January 6–7, 1995. Yousef and Mohammed were unable to stage any of the three attacks. The only fatality resulted from a test bomb planted by Yousef on Philippine Airlines Flight 434, which killed one person and injured 10 others. They also planted two other bombs in a shopping mall and theater in the southern Philippines. Elements of the Bojinka plot (including the plan to crash a plane into the CIA headquarters) would be used in the September 11 attacks on the World Trade Center and the Pentagon, six years later.

== Terminology and etymology ==
The plot is also known as Oplan Bojinka, Operation Bojinka, Project Bojinka, and Bojinga. FBI officials described Operation Bojinka as an intended "48 hours of terror."

Several news media outlets, including Time Asia, incorrectly stated that the word Bojinka means "loud bang" or "explosion" in the Croatian language. The 9/11 Commission Report states that Khalid Sheikh Mohammed said "bojinka is not Croatian for 'big bang', as has been widely reported, but rather a nonsense word he adopted after hearing it on the front lines in Afghanistan."

== Financing ==
Funding for the Bojinka plot came from Osama bin Laden, Hambali, and front organizations operated by Mohammed Jamal Khalifa (bin Laden's brother-in-law).

Wali Khan Amin Shah was the financier of the plot. He funded the plot by laundering money through his girlfriend and other Manila women, several of whom were bar hostesses and one of whom was an employee at a KFC restaurant. They were bribed with gifts and holiday trips so that they would open bank accounts to stash funds.

The transfers were small, equivalent to about 12,000 to 24,000 Philippine pesos ($500 to $1,000 US), and would be handed over each night at a Wendy's or a karaoke bar. The funds went to "Adam Sali," an alias used by Ramzi Yousef. The money came through a Filipino bank account owned by Syrian-born Omar Abu Omar, who worked at the International Relations and Information Centre, an Islamic organization run by Mohammed Jamal Khalifa.

A company called Konsojaya also provided financial assistance to the Manila cell by laundering money to it. Konsojaya was a front company that was started by the head of the group Jemaah Islamiyah, an Indonesian named Riduan Isamuddin, also known as Hambali. Shah was on the board of directors of the company.

== Planning ==
The Philippines, the operating base for Bojinka

As soon as Ramzi Yousef arrived in Manila, along with other "Arab Afghans" who were creating cells in Manila, he began work making bombs. Yousef had shown up in Singapore with Shah earlier in the autumn of 1994. The two got their Philippine visas in Singapore.

In 1994, Yousef and Khalid Sheikh Mohammed started testing airport security. Yousef booked a flight between Kai Tak International Airport in Hong Kong and Taiwan Taoyuan International Airport near Taipei. Mohammed booked a flight between Ninoy Aquino International Airport near Manila and Kimpo International Airport near Seoul. The two had already converted 14 bottles of contact lens solution into bottles containing nitroglycerin, which was readily available in the Philippines. Yousef had taped a metal rod to the arch of his foot, which would serve as a detonator. The two wore jewelry and clothing with metal to confuse airport security. To support their claim that they were meeting women, they packed condoms in their bags.

On December 8, Yousef moved into the Doña Josefa Apartments (later known simply as the Josefa Apartments and eventually converted to a hotel in 2019 under the name "Mannra Hotel") in the Malate district under the alias "Najy Awaita Haddad," using a fake Moroccan identity. He booked Unit 603 in advance with a ₱80,000 deposit and an additional ₱40,000. Mohammed claimed to be a Saudi or Qatari plywood exporter named "Abdul Majid." Upon settling in the unit, both men had already started planning Operation Bojinka.

Edith Guerrera, the manager, jokingly claimed with the receptionist after the two men asked for new registration forms, that "they have forgotten their names," adding that the first ones were torn up, but nevertheless gave in to their requests. Unknown to them, Yousef had accidentally put his actual name on the first form.

The apartment was chosen because of its location; it was 200 meters (660 ft) away from the Apostolic Nunciature, the Holy See's diplomatic mission in the Philippines, and 500 meters (1,600 ft) down the street from Manila Police Station No. 9 on Quirino Avenue. One of the windows of the unit looks down on the path that the papal motorcade was to take. A conspirator named Abdul Hakim Murad went to Manila with Yousef and stayed at the same apartment.

People were suspicious of the men in Unit 603, who were described as being very secretive. According to Guerrera, the men gave the impression that they were in the Philippines to study, adding that "they looked like students." She also revealed that they double-locked the door when they were inside or out and never asked for a cleaning crew to clear up the room, also adding that they "had chemical burns on their hands," carried boxes, and never hired other people to help them. Also unknown to them, the boxes contained chemicals bought from suppliers in Manila and Quezon City in Metro Manila, which Yousef used to make his bombs.

According to Abdul Hakim Murad, he gave Yousef an idea for crashing a plane into the CIA's headquarters; Yousef took this suggestion but did not draft plots for it at the moment, before heading off with Mohammed to Puerto Galera for scuba diving.

== Test bombs: mall, theater, Flight 434 ==
Yousef's first operational test of his bomb was inside a mall in Cebu City. The bomb detonated several hours after he put it in a generator room. It caused little damage, but it proved to Yousef that his bomb was workable. On December 1, 1994, Yousef placed a bomb under a seat in the Greenbelt Theatre in Makati City near Manila to test what would happen if a bomb exploded under an airline seat. The bomb successfully went off, injuring several patrons.

Following this incident, Yousef booked the Manila-Cebu leg of the Narita-bound Philippine Airlines Flight 434 under the alias Armaldo Forlani, using a forged Italian passport. During this leg, he built another bomb, which had one-tenth of the power that his final bombs were planned to have, in the lavatory of the aircraft, setting the timer for four hours. Yousef planted the bomb inside the life jacket pouch of seat 26K, which he moved into after takeoff, and disembarked in Cebu.

The bomb exploded while the aircraft was over Japan's Minamidaitō Island, part of Okinawa Prefecture, killing Haruki Ikegami, a Japanese citizen occupying the seat; an additional 10 passengers were injured. The flight was carrying 273 passengers. The blast blew a hole in the floor, and the cabin's rapid expansion severed several control cables in the ceiling, cutting off control of the plane's right aileron, as well as both the captain's and first officer's steering controls. Usually, 26K, the seat that Yousef chose to plant the bomb, would be positioned directly over the centre fuel tank, and the detonation of the bomb would have caused a crippling explosion, but on this particular airframe, a former Scandinavian Airlines aircraft, the seat was two rows forward from normal. The flight crew kept control of the Boeing 747-200 and brought it into an emergency landing at Okinawa's Naha Airport. Satisfied with the deadly results of the attack, Yousef then planned which flights to attack for "Phase II" of the plot.

== Phase I: Pope assassination plot ==
The first plan was to assassinate Pope John Paul II when he visited the Philippines during the World Youth Day celebrations in January 1995. On January 15 of that year, a suicide bomber would dress up as a priest while John Paul II passed in his motorcade on his way to the San Carlos Seminary in Makati. The assassin planned to get close to the Pope and detonate the bomb. The planned assassination of the Pope was intended to divert attention from the next phase of the operation. About 20 men had been trained by Yousef to carry out this act prior to January 1995.

The details of Phase I were found in the evidence discovered in the investigation into Unit 603 in the Doña Josefa.

== Phase II: Airline bombing plot ==
The next plan would have involved at least five terrorists, including Yousef, Shah, Murad, and two more unknown operatives. Beginning on January 21, 1995, and ending on January 22, 1995, they would have placed bombs on 11 United States–bound airliners that had stopovers scattered throughout East Asia and Southeast Asia. U.S. airlines were chosen instead of Asian airlines to maximize the shock to Americans. The flights targeted were listed under operatives with codenames: "Zyed", "Majbos", "Markoa", "Mirqas", and "Obaid".

Each of the intended flights had two legs; the bombs would be planted inside life jackets under seats on the first leg, and each bomber would then disembark. Each conspirator would plant bombs on at least two flights in this way, then catch a flight to Pakistan. They would set timers for the bombs to explode over the Pacific Ocean and the South China Sea almost simultaneously, intending to immediately shut down air travel worldwide. The U.S. government estimated the prospective death toll to be about 4,000 if the plot had been executed, as compared to almost 3,000 killed during the September 11 attacks in the United States.

=== Bombs ===
The "Mark II microbombs" would have Casio digital watches as the timers, stabilizers that looked like cotton balls, and an undetectable quantity of nitroglycerin as the explosive. Other ingredients included glycerin, nitric and sulfuric acid, and minute concentrations of nitrobenzene, silver azide (silver trinitride), and liquid acetone. Two 9-volt batteries in each bomb were used as a power source, connected to light bulb filaments that would detonate the bomb. Murad and Yousef wired a silicon controlled rectifier as the switch to trigger the filaments to detonate the bomb. There was an external socket hidden when the wires were pushed under the watch base as the bomber would wear it; this alteration was so small that the watch could still be worn in a normal manner.

Yousef got batteries and detonator wires past airport security during his December 11 test bombing of Philippine Airlines Flight 434 by hiding them in hollowed-out heels of his shoes. As most airport metal detectors at the time could only detect metal above the ankles, Yousef's shoes failed to set them off. He smuggled the nitroglycerin on board by putting it inside a small container, supposedly an empty contact lens cleaning solution bottle.

=== Airports planned to be targeted ===
==== Asia ====
- Kai Tak Airport in British Hong Kong
- Narita International Airport in Tokyo, Japan
- Ninoy Aquino International Airport in Manila, Philippines
- Chiang Kai-shek (Taoyuan) International Airport in Taipei, Taiwan
- Singapore Changi Airport in Singapore
- Gimpo International Airport in Seoul, South Korea
- Bangkok (Don Mueang) International Airport in Bangkok, Thailand

==== United States ====
- Honolulu International Airport, Honolulu, Hawaii
- John F. Kennedy International Airport, New York City
- Los Angeles International Airport, Los Angeles
- Chicago O'Hare International Airport, Chicago
- San Francisco International Airport, San Francisco

=== Targeted flights ===
- "Zyed" was to plant bombs on a Northwest Airlines Manila–Seoul–Los Angeles flight, a United Airlines Seoul–Taipei–Honolulu flight, and a United Bangkok–Taipei–San Francisco flight.
- "Majbos" was to plant bombs on a United Airlines Taipei–Tokyo–Los Angeles flight, and a United Tokyo–Hong Kong–New York flight.
- "Maroka" was to plant bombs on a Northwest Airlines Manila–Tokyo–Chicago flight, and a Northwest Tokyo–Hong Kong–New York flight.
- "Mirqas" was to plant bombs on a United Airlines Manila–Seoul–San Francisco flight, and a Delta Air Lines Seoul–Taipei–Bangkok flight.
- "Obaida" was to plant bombs on a United Airlines Singapore–Hong Kong–Los Angeles flight, and a United Airlines plane which would return to Singapore for a Singapore–Hong Kong–San Francisco flight.

Each of them would disembark from each plane before the final (fatal) leg of the flight, then fly to Pakistan after planting their last bomb.

== Phase III: CIA plane crash plot ==
Murad's confession detailed Phase III in his interrogation by the Manila police after his capture.

Phase III would have involved Murad either renting, buying, or hijacking a small airplane, preferably a Cessna. The airplane would be filled with explosives. He would then crash it into the Central Intelligence Agency headquarters in the Langley area in Fairfax County, Virginia. Murad had been trained as a pilot in North Carolina, and was slated to be a suicide pilot.

There were alternate plans to hijack a 12th commercial airliner and use that instead of the small aircraft, probably due to the Manila cell's growing frustration with explosives, as they knew testing them in a house or apartment was dangerous and could easily give away the terrorist plot. Khalid Sheikh Mohammed likely made the alternate plan.

A report from the Philippines to the United States on January 20, 1995, stated, "What the subject has in his mind is that he will board any American commercial aircraft pretending to be an ordinary passenger. Then he will hijack said aircraft, control its cockpit, and dive it at the CIA headquarters."

Another plot that was considered would have involved the hijacking of more airplanes. The World Trade Center (New York City, New York), the Pentagon (Arlington, Virginia), the United States Capitol (Washington, D.C.), the White House (Washington, D.C.), the Sears Tower (Chicago, Illinois), the U.S. Bank Tower (Los Angeles, California), the Renaissance Center (Detroit, Michigan) and the Transamerica Pyramid (San Francisco, California) would have been the likely targets. In his confession to Filipino investigators, prior to the foiling of Operation Bojinka, Murad said that this part of the plot was dropped since the Manila cell could not recruit enough people to implement other hijackings. This plot would eventually be the base plot for the September 11 attacks, which involved hijacking commercial airliners as opposed to small aircraft loaded with explosives and crashing them into their intended targets. However, only the World Trade Center (which was destroyed) and The Pentagon (which suffered partial damage) were hit. The original plan for the September 11 attacks was to hijack ten airplanes, with one of them confirmed to have been planned to crash into the U.S. Bank Tower in Los Angeles. Additionally, the United States Capitol and the White House were the potential targets of United Airlines Flight 93 but were never hit due to passengers revolting against the hijackers, which caused the hijacked plane to crash into a field near Shanksville, Pennsylvania.

== Discovery and termination ==
The plot was abandoned after an apartment fire at the six-story Doña Josefa apartments occurred in Manila, Philippines, on the evening of Friday, January 6, 1995. The fire occurred before Pope John Paul II was scheduled to visit the Philippines on January 12.

According to the initial accounts of the Philippine authorities, Murad started a chemical fire in the kitchen sink in Room 603 on the sixth floor of the Doña Josefa apartment by pouring water on a substance. The fire was spotted at about 11:00 p.m. after residents complained about a strange odour. Edith Guerrera, the owner of the apartments, called the fire brigade, but the fire went out unassisted. Yousef and Murad had told the firefighters to stay away before they fled. Police Major Francisco F. Bautista and his staff, including watch commander Aida D. Fariscal, decided to investigate the situation and saw four hot plates in their packing crates, what looked like cotton batting soaked in a beige solution, and loops of green, red, blue, and yellow electrical wiring. The telephone rang, and the police ran downstairs, thinking that it was a trap. Fariscal had been suspicious of the men in Room 603 due to the recent wave of bombings (committed by Yousef) that hit Metro Manila and Philippine Airlines Flight 434. Seeking a search warrant, they left and asked 11 judges before finding one that would grant a warrant.

A 2002 Los Angeles Times article stated that the police deliberately set a fire to rouse the men out of their apartment.

After police discovered the evidence, they arrested a man who called himself "Ahmed Saeed". "Saeed", who later proved to be Murad, claimed that he was a commercial pilot who was on his way to the precinct house to explain that what he claimed to be firecrackers had gone off. Murad initially tried to run away, but he was arrested after he tripped over a tree root. The arresting officer, having lost his handcuffs, improvised a solution by tying Murad's hands with the elastic cord taken from the officer's raincoat. Murad was hauled to the precinct in a taxi van with the help of two other people. He offered 110,740 Philippine pesos (US$2,000) to the policemen if they would agree to let him go, but the officers refused. At the precinct, Murad signed a statement saying that he was innocent and that he was a tourist visiting his friend in his chemical import/export business. He then mumbled about "two Satans that must be destroyed: the Pope and America."

Fariscal was later depicted in the 2006 docudrama The Path to 9/11, in which US agencies in the script gave her much credit. An actress portrays her in the Mayday episode "Bomb on Board". The widow of a slain police officer, she had spent 17 years as a homemaker before enrolling in the police department in 1977. She became well known in her home nation, which awarded her the equivalent of 33,222 pesos ($700) and a trip to Taiwan. The CIA awarded her a certificate reading "In recognition of your personal outstanding efforts and co-operation". Her decision to investigate the fire was key to disrupting the plot and forcing Yousef to flee.

== Evidence in Room 603 ==
When the officers returned to Suite 603 at 2:30 a.m. on January 7, they found street maps of Manila with routes plotting the papal motorcade, a rosary, a photograph of the pontiff, bibles, crucifixes, papal confessions, and priest clothing, including robes and collars. This collection of objects and a phone message from a tailor reminding the occupant that "the cassock was ready to be tried on," along with the fact of the Pope's impending visit, were enough for Police Major Francisco F. Bautista to infer that an assassination plot had been interrupted. A search warrant was granted by 4:00 a.m. on January 7.

More chemicals, such as gallons of sulfuric acid, picric acid, nitric acid, glycerin, acetone, sodium chlorate, nitrobenzene, ammonia, silver nitrate, methenamine, and ANFO were found. Several cans of gasoline and two large Welch's grape juice bottles containing nitroglycerin were found. Equipment such as thermometers, graduated cylinders, large cooking kettles, funnels, fuses, filters, soldering irons, beakers, mortars, pestles, different electronic fusing systems, timers, switches, and circuit breakers were found. Also discovered in the search was a finished remote-controlled brass pipe bomb, as well as another pipe bomb that was about to be packed. The apartment also contained a chemistry textbook and chemical dictionary, a Time magazine with the cover story on international terrorism, as well as a pharmacy receipt and bottle of contact lens solution. In a cupboard under the sink, a finished time bomb and other Casio F-91W watches were found.

The most conclusive piece of evidence found was a manual written in Arabic on how to build a liquid bomb.

Stacks of 12 false passports, including Norwegian, Afghan, Saudi, and Pakistani were also found in the apartment. Investigators found a business card from Mohammed Jamal Khalifa; Saeed apparently possessed five telephone numbers from Khalifa. Investigators also found telephone numbers for Rose Masquera, Mohammed's girlfriend.

=== Yousef's computer ===
Yousef's project was discovered on four floppy disks and an off-white Toshiba laptop inside his apartment, two weeks before the plot would have been implemented. Several encrypted files on the hard drive contained flight schedules, calculations of detonation times, and other items. The first string of text in one of the files states, "All people who support the U.S. government are our targets in our future plans and that is because all those people are responsible for their government's actions and they support the U.S. foreign policy and are satisfied with it. We will hit all U.S. nuclear targets. If the U.S. government keeps supporting Israel, then we will continue to carry out operations inside and outside the United States to include ..." which is where the text ended.

A file named "Bojinka" lists the 11 flights between Asia and the United States, which were grouped under five codenames. Strings were found, such as "SETTING: 9:30 pm to 10:30 pm TIMER: 23HR. BOJINKA: 20:30-21:30 NRT Date 5" (for United flight 80), and "SETTING: 8:30-9:00. TIMER: 10HR. BOJINKA: 19:30-20:00 NRT Date 4" (for Northwest Flight 30).

The laptop had names of dozens of associates, including some photographs of a few of them and including contact information for Mohammed Jamal Khalifa. They contained records of information about five-star hotels, dealings with a London trading corporation, a meat market owner in Malaysia, and an Islamic center in Tucson, Arizona. Information about how money moved through an Abu Dhabi banking firm was found.

A communication signed "Khalid Shaikh + Bojinka" was also found on Yousef's computer that threatened to attack targets "in response to the financial, political and military assistance given to the Jewish state in the occupied land of Palestine by the United States Government." The letter also said that the bombers claimed to have the "ability to make and use chemicals and poisonous gas ... for use against vital institutions and populations and the sources of drinking water."

The letter also threatened to assassinate Fidel V. Ramos, then-President of the Philippines, as well as attack aircraft if the United States did not meet the group's demands. The letter said that the group claiming responsibility was the "Fifth Division of the Liberation Army."

The evidence found at the Doña Josefa filled three police vans.

== Murad's confession ==
Sometime after police arrested Saeed, he had called Ramzi Yousef's cellular phone.

Saeed turned out to be Murad, who was sent to the apartment to retrieve the computer after the fire. Murad was sent to Camp Crame, the headquarters of the Philippine National Police. Murad at first taunted investigators. For 67 days, he endured "tactical interrogation" by Filipino investigators.

According to journalists Marites Dañguilan Vitug and Glenda M. Gloria, authors of the book Under the Crescent Moon: Rebellion in Mindanao, agents hit Murad with a chair and club of wood when he did not talk. They forced water into his mouth and crushed out lit cigarettes on his genitals. Murad's ribs were completely cracked. Agents were surprised that he survived. According to an investigator, he finally confessed after an agent masquerading as a member of the Mossad told him that he was being sent to Israel.

Murad admitted in his interrogations, "This is my — the best thing. I enjoy it," and "because the United States is the first country in this world making trouble for us, for Muslims, and for our people."

He talked about the bombs. "Nobody [would] think that it's [an] explosive," he said, referring to the watches Yousef planned to put on the airliners. He said that the nitroglycerin "which even if you'll put in the X-ray, you will never, nobody can" detect it.

Murad confessed that he was on a quest to be a martyr. He confessed to being the hijacker as part of Phase II of his plan. Murad was extradited to the United States on April 12, 1995. His testimony helped convict Yousef.

== Manhunt ==
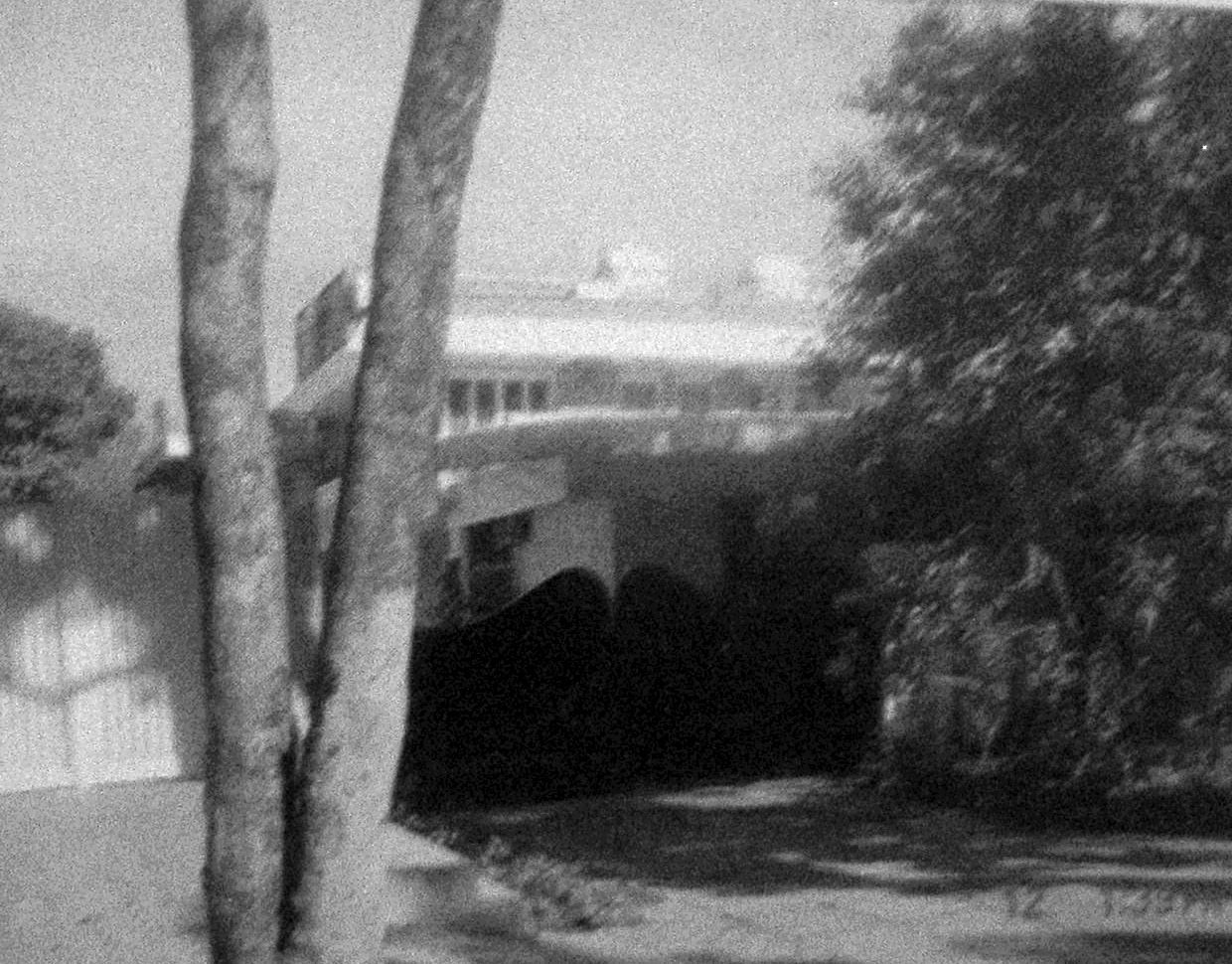
Islamabad guesthouse where Yousef was captured in February 1995

Shah was arrested at an apartment complex on January 11 after police saw that a pager called by Yousef was registered in the name of Shah's girlfriend. Shah escaped from custody about 77 hours later. Shah was found to be a conspirator after authorities saw photos of him scanned on the laptop that contained information about the plot, and cell phone numbers that led investigators to the apartment. Yousef and Mohammed were able to escape from the Philippines to Pakistan. On January 31, 1995, Yousef flew from Pakistan to Thailand in an attempt to place suitcase bombs on a Delta Air Lines and United Airlines aircraft. When that failed, he flew back to Pakistan.

After receiving Murad's phone call, Yousef made plans to leave and flew to Singapore about five hours after Murad's arrest. One day after Bojinka was discovered, Yousef made his way to Pakistan. Mohammed went to Pakistan days or weeks afterwards.

The Philippines forwarded details on the Bojinka plot to the United States in April 1995. Konsojaya was heard via wiretaps to be frequently in contact with Mohammed Jamal Khalifa's charitable organization until the plot was discovered.

Yousef was arrested in the Su-Casa guest house in Islamabad, Pakistan on February 7, 1995, after a 23-day manhunt. Yousef later boasted to U.S. Secret Service agent Brian Parr about his plan. Shah was picked up in Malaysia in December 1995. His identity was revealed after he was fingerprinted. Shah was also extradited to the United States.

All three conspirators received life sentences for participating in the plot. Yousef also received a 240-year sentence along with his life sentence for the 1993 World Trade Center bombing. Yousef was sentenced on January 8, 1998, and Murad was sentenced on May 16, 1998. Shah has been cooperating with the government since August 1998.

Mohammed Jamal Khalifa, a businessman from Jeddah who was married to one of Osama bin Laden's sisters, was in the Philippines earlier in 1994. He was arrested in 1994 in Mountain View, California, for conspiring in the 1993 World Trade Center bombing. He was financing the Bojinka plot, according to the content that the Filipino investigators forwarded to the United States. The United States Immigration and Naturalization Service deported Khalifa to Jordan in May 1995. He was acquitted by the Jordanian court and moved to Saudi Arabia. He was murdered in his hotel room in January 2007 in Madagascar.

== Aftermath ==
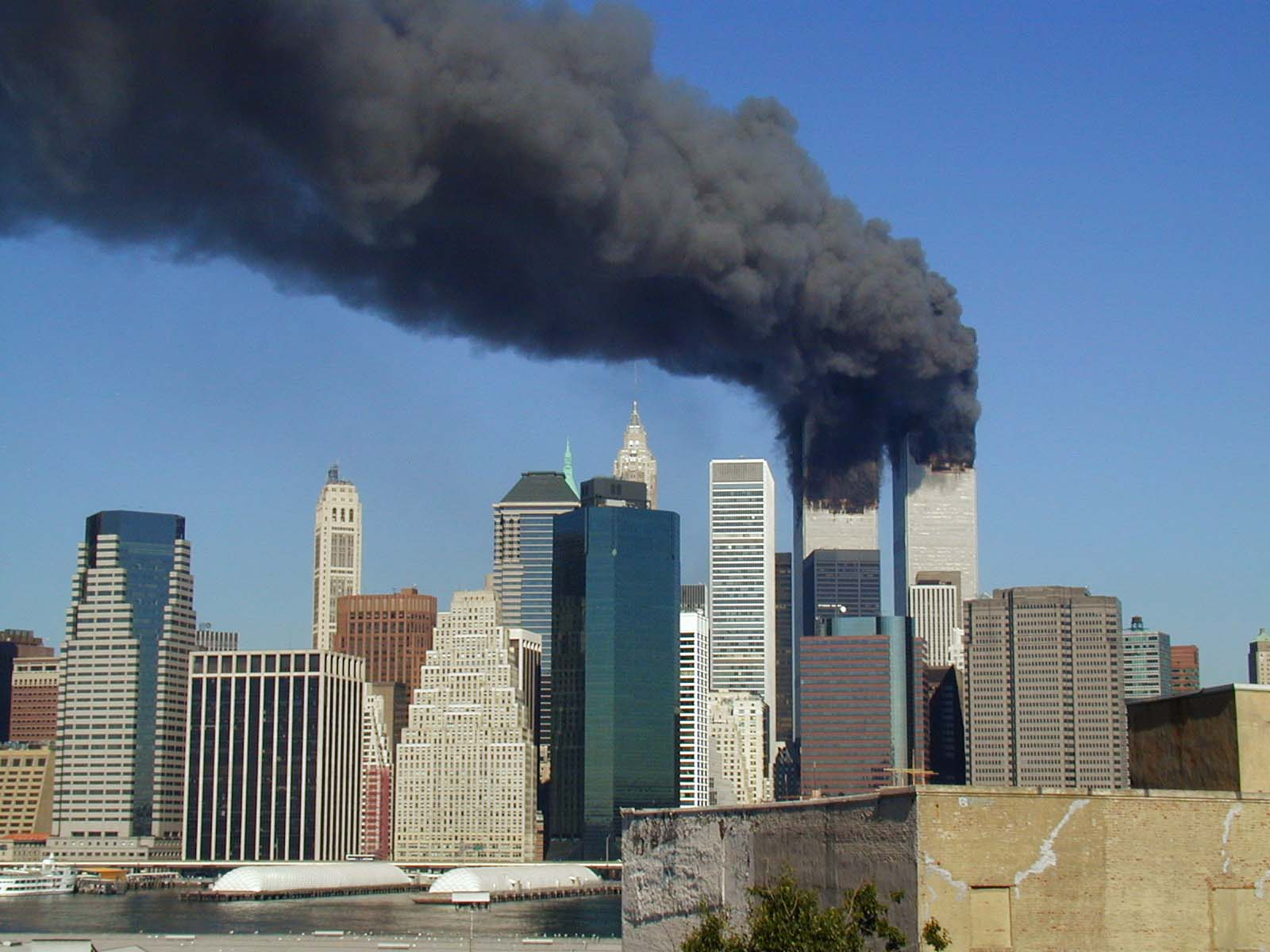
The September 11 attacks evolved from the original Bojinka plot.

U.S. investigators did not find the connection with Mohammed to al-Qaeda until several years later.

Mohammed decided that explosives were too risky to use in his next plot and chose instead to use airplanes. The plot was later revised and executed during the September 11 attacks. Mohammed was arrested in Rawalpindi, Pakistan in 2003.

Yousef filed a motion for a new trial in 2001. The United States Court of Appeals for the Second Circuit heard the case on May 3, 2002, and announced on April 3, 2003, the decision that Yousef and his partners were to remain incarcerated.

Fox News anchorman Jon Scott, a licensed pilot, admitted to referencing Bojinka during their network's coverage of the September 11, 2001 attacks, as he had studied the plot and was able to attribute the attack to Osama bin Laden less than a minute after United Airlines flight 175 struck. "I was reading everything I could get my hands on regarding aviation. Well, I read about something called the Bojinka plot, which was a plot that Ramzi Yousef had hatched with Usama bin Laden ... they wanted to kill the Pope and they wanted to blow up 11 airliners as they flew across the Pacific toward the United States. ... That plot had been disrupted and the FBI was looking for bin Laden as a result of that plot, and I knew that just from my aviation pursuits. So, when a couple of airplanes flew into the World Trade Center, the first suspect that came to mind was Usama bin Laden."

Bojinka was included in a number of 9/11 documentaries and miniseries, including The Path to 9/11 and The Secret History of 9/11.

== See also ==
- Pan Am Flight 103, Pan Am plane destroyed by pentaerythritol tetranitrate (PETN) bomb, killing 270 people
- 2001 failed shoe bomb attempt, failed al-Qaeda PETN bombing of plane
- 2006 transatlantic aircraft plot, failed plot to blow up at least 10 planes as they flew from the U.K. to the U.S. and Canada
- Debt of Honor, a 1994 Tom Clancy novel in which a JAL 747 is used as a weapon against Washington, D.C.
- Cargo planes bomb plot, failed al-Qaeda PETN bombing of plane
- Executive Decision, a 1996 Kurt Russell movie in which a 747 is used as a weapon targeting Washington, D.C.
- List of terrorist incidents, 1995
- Northwest Airlines Flight 253, failed al-Qaeda PETN bombing of plane
