= Mohammed Jamal Khalifa =

Saudi Arabian businessman (1957–2007)

Mohammed Jamal Khalifa محمد جمال خليفه
- Born: 1 February 1957; Jeddah, Saudi Arabia
- Died: 31 January 2007 (aged 49); Madagascar
- Occupation: Businessman

Mohammed Jamal Khalifa (Arabic: محمد جمال خليفه) (1 February 1957 – 31 January 2007) was a Saudi businessman from Jeddah who married one of Osama bin Laden's sisters. He was accused of funding terror plots and groups in the Philippines in the 1990s while head of the International Islamic Relief Organization branch there. He was murdered in Madagascar in 2007.

== Biography ==
Khalifa trained with Osama bin Laden in the mujahideen camps of the Afghan mujahideen in Afghanistan during the Soviet–Afghan War.

=== Philippines ===
Khalifa came to the Philippines in 1987 or 1988. He was the first head of the International Islamic Relief Organization’s Philippine branch, and also the IIRO's regional director for all of Southeast Asia.

Khalifa married a local woman, Alice "Jameelah" Yabo, and frequently exited and entered the country for "business" reasons. Yabo was the sister of Ahmad al-Hamwi, better known as Abu Omar who was a top leader in the militant group Abu Sayyaf.

According to Zachary Abuza, Khalifa established several charities and Islamic organizations in the Philippines ostensibly for charity and religious reasons, but which channelled money to extremist groups. According to Newsweek, Filipino officials said Khalifa raised several hundred thousand dollars during his eight years in the Philippines, but most of the money (as much as 70 percent, according to Wahab Akbar, governor of the Basilan region where the Abu Sayyaf is based) was spent funding Islamic extremists like Abu Sayyaf. One example of his syphoning off of charitable funds, according to Newsweek, was his reporting to his "Saudi sponsors" that he had built 33 orphanages across the southern Philippines when in fact Khalifa had set up only one institution for orphans.

Khalifa founded the "Benevolence International Corporation" (BIC) in the Philippines in 1988, apparently to recruit people for the Afghan jihad against the Soviets. The BIC claimed to be an import-export company. In 1992, that group folded visible operations while another group known as the Islamic Benevolence Committee renamed itself to Benevolence International Foundation. What was left of the Benevolence International Corporation allegedly gave logistical support to terrorists, and has been accused of assisting the 1993 World Trade Center bombing and the Bojinka plot (of Khalid Sheikh Mohammed, Ramzi Yousef to blow up 11 American jetliners killing 4,000 people in early 1995).

Another organization founded by Khalifa, the International Relations and Information Center, has been called (by Zachary Abuza) the "primary funding mechanism" for the Bojinka plan. Money was embezzled from the International Relations and Information Center through the bank account of Omar Abu Omar, an employee at the center, to an account under the name of Adel Sabah, an alias of Ramzi Yousef.

According to the Philippines National Security Advisor, Roilo Golez, Khalifa "built up the good will of the community through charity and then turned segments of the population into agents." A Philippines intelligence report claimed that "the IIRO which claims to be a relief institution is being utilized by foreign extremist as a pipeline through which funding for the local extremists are being coursed through".

A defector from the Abu Sayyaf Group (ASG) told authorities "The IIRO was behind the construction of Mosques, school buildings and other livelihood projects" but only "in areas penetrated, highly influenced and controlled by the Abu Sayyaf." According to the defector "Only 10 to 30% of the foreign funding goes to the legitimate relief and livelihood projects and the rest go to terrorist operations."

According to Rohan Gunaratna, Khalifa dispatched at least one Filipino youth to Tripoli, Libya, on an eight-month training course and on his return in 1990 urged him to join ASG. He sent other ASG members for religious training to the International Islamic University in Pakistan and for military training with Al Qaeda's International Islamic Brigade in Afghanistan, their visits being financed by IIRO.

From the Philippines, he "established links with Islamists in Iraq, Jordan, Turkey, Russia, Malaysia, the UAE, Romania, Lebanon, Syria, Pakistan, Albania, the Netherlands and Morocco, enabling the ASG to develop relationships with terrorist groups" throughout the Middle East and Asia.

According to Abuza, while Philippine government claimed to have shut down all the charities run by Khalifa to finance Abu Sayyaf, a senior Philippine intelligence official complained to him, "We could not touch the IIRO" because "intense diplomatic pressure" from Saudi Arabia kept the charity open. "Their most important source of leverage was the visas and jobs for several hundred thousand Filipino guest workers", which they could withhold if the Philippine government angered them.

=== Deportation and release ===
The first record U.S. authorities had of Khalifa reportedly came in 1992, when his alias "Barra" appeared on a bomb-making manual carried by Ahmed Ajaj who entered the United States on a false passport.

On 1 December 1994, Khalifa met Mohamed Loay Bayazid, the president of Benevolence International Foundation, in the United States. Khalifa and Bayazid were arrested on December 14, 1994, in Mountain View, California on charges related to the 1993 World Trade Center bombing. Khalifa was planning to fly to the Philippines.

When the FBI looked inside Khalifa's luggage, they found manuals in Arabic on training terrorists, which covered subjects such as bomb-making and other violent activities. Khalifa claims that his possession of the materials was innocent. They found a personal organizer with several contacts. One phone number was for Wali Khan Amin Shah, a member of the Manila cell, which was plotting Operation Bojinka at the time. There was also a listing for an unknown man, who might have been Khalid Sheik Mohammed. Khalifa was placed in solitary confinement and the contents of his luggage were logged and edited.

Khalifa was held without bail for several months, before being deported to Jordan. In Jordan, a court had convicted Khalifa in absentia for a string of theatre bombings. Khalifa faced a possible death sentence as a result. Khalifa first fought his deportation by suing the government.

On 6–7 January 1995, Operation Bojinka was discovered after a fire at Ramzi Yousef's Manila apartment. Investigators found evidence related to the plot. Abdul Hakim Murad, who was arrested at the apartment, had five phone numbers pointing to Khalifa. They also found logs of phone calls to and from Khalifa before his arrest and contact information on Yousef's computer.

Despite this evidence, forwarded to the United States from the Philippines in March 1995, suggesting Khalifa was funding the foiled Operation Bojinka plot, Khalifa was not arrested but his belongings were returned and he was deported to Jordan on May 5 by the INS as he requested. (Despite the fact that on 18 April, the conviction in Jordan was overturned as a key witness recanted his testimony.) In Jordan, a court acquitted Khalifa. Bayazid was also let go. Khalifa left for the Philippines and returned to Saudi Arabia. The US deported him to Lebanon where he had already been sentenced to death in absentia for conspiracy to carry out terrorist acts. He was re-tried and acquitted, then released to Saudi Arabia.

Khalifa was arrested in Saudi Arabia shortly after the September 11, 2001 attacks, but was released without charges being filed. Later that year, he publicly condemned Osama Bin Laden and publicly distanced himself from Al Qaeda.

=== Death ===
On 31 January 2007, the day before his 50th birthday, Khalifa was killed while visiting a gemstone mine he owned in Sakamilko, near the town of Sakaraha in southern Madagascar. Reports state that around 25 to 30 armed men raided Khalifa's residence in the middle of the night, attacked him with various weapons, and removed his computer and other intelligence materials. His family came to believe that he was assassinated by operators from the Joint Special Operations Command.
