= Aida Fariscal =

Filipino police officer

Aida D. Fariscal (born c. 1940) was a Filipino police officer and watch commander in the Manila Police Department.

Fariscal spent seventeen years as a homemaker before enrolling in the police department in 1977. The widow of a slain police officer, she rose through the ranks of the Manila Police Department, and in 1983 won an award for arresting three murder suspects on Mindoro Island.

== Antiterrorism ==
On the night of January 6, 1995, she was suspicious about a small fire that went out unassisted at the Doña Josefa Apartments; her suspicions were augmented by a wave of bombings that hit Metro Manila, and Philippine Airlines Flight 434. This led her to uncover a terrorist plot made by alleged Al Qaida agents named Operation Bojinka. She came to the apartment with a partner, looked around, and left after a telephone rang, fearing that it might be a remote trigger for an explosive.

She had to ask 11 judges to find one that would grant her a search warrant. She, along with a group of investigators and police then uncovered evidence, before arresting a suspect who called himself Ahmed Saeed. She refused to let go of the suspect, who turned out to be Abdul Hakim Murad, after he offered her 110,740 Philippine pesos ($2,000 U.S. dollars).

Her decision to investigate the fire possibly saved thousands of lives, including possibly that of Pope John Paul II. She received a monetary award of the equivalent of 33,222 pesos ($700) and a trip to Taiwan from the government. She also won a laminated award from the CIA for her action. The certificate reads, "Awarded to Senior Inspector Aida D. Fariscal, in recognition of your personal outstanding efforts and co-operation." After she foiled the plot, the Philippine police assigned her two bodyguards for five years. The bodyguard service ended shortly before September 11, 2001.

She died of an illness in April 2006.

== In popular culture ==
She is depicted in the 2006 docudrama The Path to 9/11, although by a much younger actress. An actress portrays her in the Mayday (Air Emergency, Air Crash Investigation) episode "Bomb on Board."
