= Philippine Airlines Flight 434 =

1994 aircraft bombing over the Philippine Sea

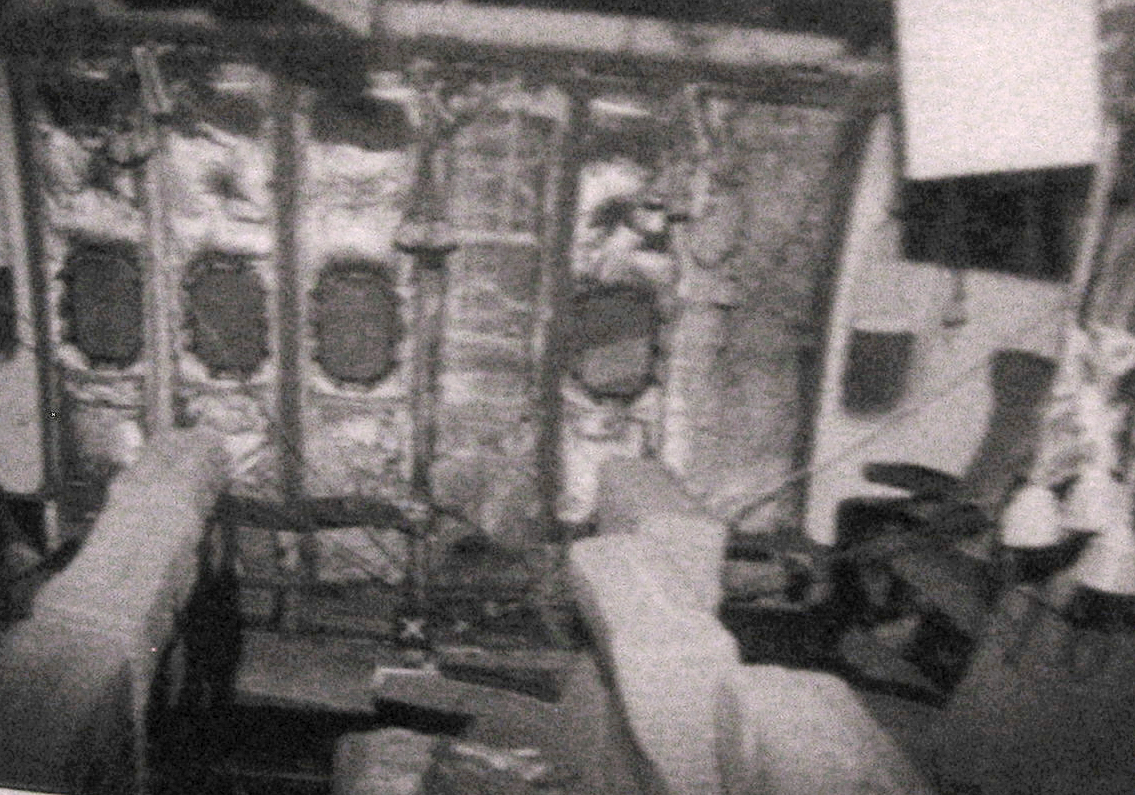
- The interior of the aircraft after the bombing

Bombing
- Date: 11 December 1994
- Summary: Bomb planted by Ramzi Yousef as a test for the Bojinka plot
- Site: Minami Daito Island, Okinawa, Japan; 25°50′45″N 131°14′30″E

Aircraft
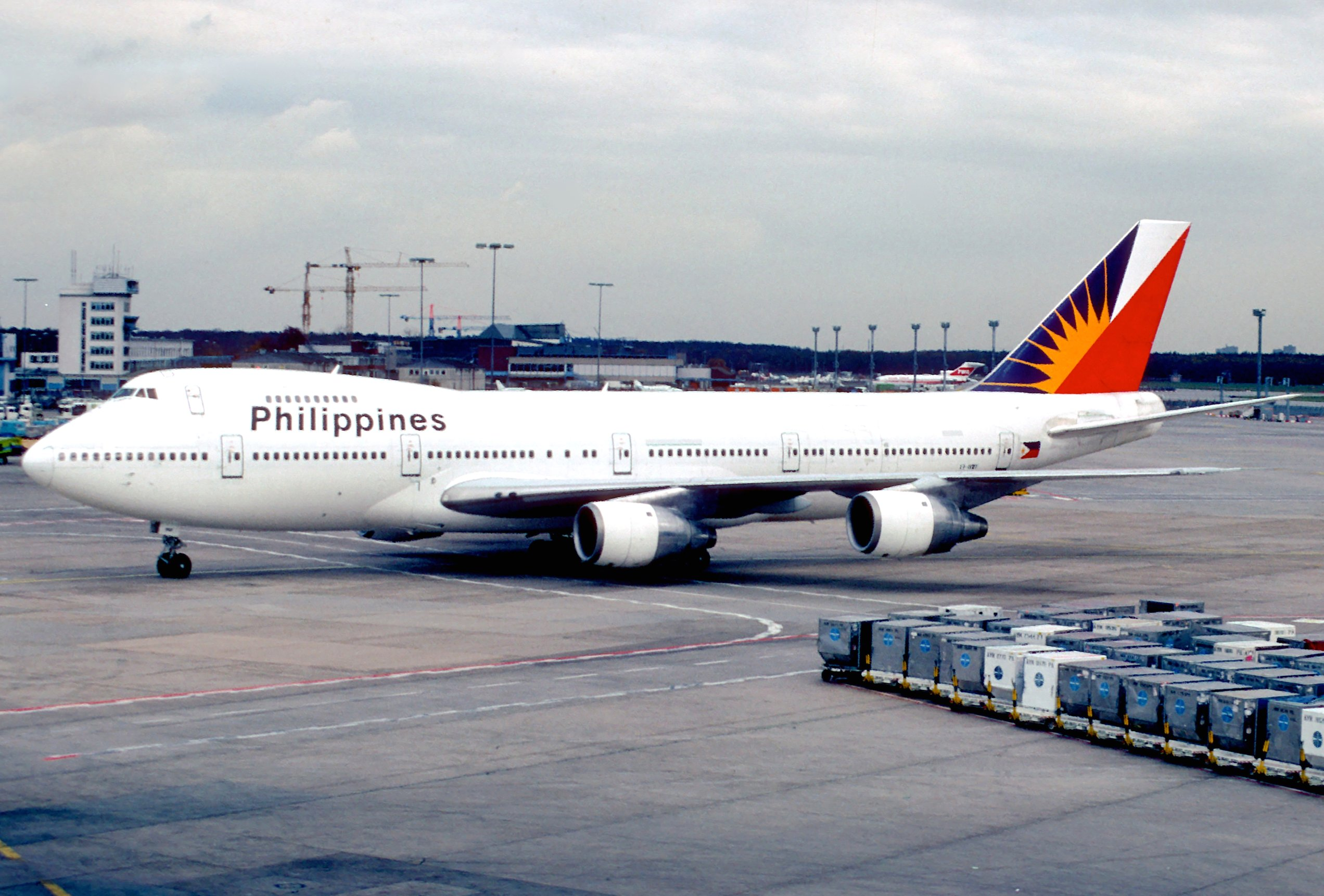
- EI-BWF, the aircraft involved, pictured in 1988
- Aircraft type: Boeing 747-283BM Combi
- Operator: Philippine Airlines
- IATA flight No.: PR434
- ICAO flight No.: PAL434
- Call sign: PHILIPPINE 434
- Registration: EI-BWF
- Flight origin: Ninoy Aquino International Airport, Pasay, Philippines
- Stopover: Mactan–Cebu International Airport, Cebu, Philippines
- Destination: Narita International Airport, Tokyo, Japan
- Occupants: 293
- Passengers: 273
- Crew: 20
- Fatalities: 1
- Injuries: 10
- Survivors: 292

Philippine Airlines Flight 434 (sometimes referred to as PAL434 or PR434) was a scheduled flight on December 11, 1994, from Manila to Tokyo with a quick stopover in Cebu on a Boeing 747-200 that was seriously damaged by a bomb, killing one passenger and damaging vital control systems, although the plane was in a repairable state. The bombing was a test run of the unsuccessful Bojinka terrorist attacks. The Boeing 747 was flying the second leg of a route from Mactan–Cebu International Airport in Cebu, Philippines to Narita International Airport, in Tokyo, Japan. After the bomb detonated, 58-year-old veteran pilot Captain Eduardo "Ed" Reyes was able to land the aircraft, saving it and the remaining passengers and crew.

Authorities later discovered that Ramzi Yousef, a passenger on the aircraft's prior flight leg from Manila's Ninoy Aquino International Airport, had placed the explosive. In order to not get caught, Yousef boarded the flight under the false name "Armaldo Forlani", which was an incorrect spelling of Arnaldo Forlani, the Prime Minister of Italy from 1980–1981. Yousef was later convicted of committing the 1993 World Trade Center bombing in New York City.

== Background ==
=== Aircraft ===
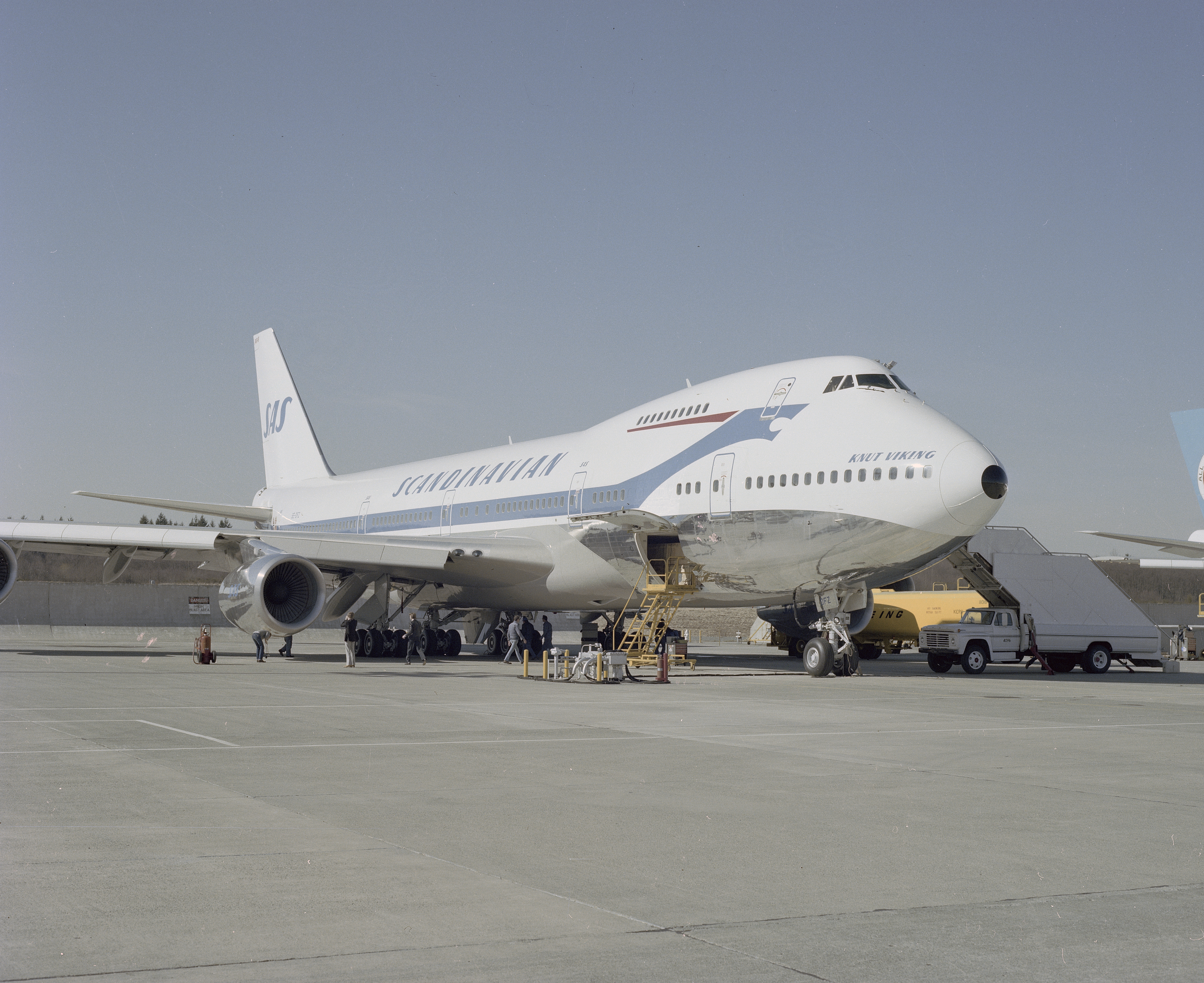
The aircraft involved while in service with SAS. SAS' unconventional placement of seat 26K ahead of the fuel tank mitigated the effects of the explosion.

The aircraft operating Flight 434 was a 15-year-old Boeing 747-283BM Combi owned by Guinness Peat Aviation (GPA), registered as EI-BWF, serial number 21575. It first flew on February 17, 1979, and was delivered to Scandinavian Airlines (SAS) on March 2, 1979, as SE-DFZ, operating the plane as "Knut Viking". After its SAS service, the aircraft was sold to Guinness Peat Aviation and leased to Philippine Airlines on September 7, 1988.

=== Crew ===
The flight crew consisted of the following:

- Captain Eduardo "Ed" Reyes (1936 – 14 February 2007), a 58-year-old veteran pilot who served in the Philippine Air Force from 1958 to 1964, and had flown with Philippine Airlines since 1964. Reyes was previously involved in an incident documented on January 16, 1990, when all four engines of a Boeing 747-200 operating as Philippine Airlines Flight 104, a flight to Honolulu, shut down at 37,000 feet (11,000 m), causing the aircraft to go into unpowered flight until Reyes and his crew restarted the engines at 25,500 feet (7,800 m) and safely landed at Honolulu without further incident.
- First Officer Jaime Herrera (1948 – 27 March 2021), also a veteran pilot who had flown with Philippine Airlines since 1970. Herrera was 46 years old and was serving as co-pilot at the time of the bombing.
- Flight Engineer Dexter Comendador (born 6 November 1960), who, like Reyes, was also a Philippine Air Force pilot, serving from 1983 to 1992. He had flown with Philippine Airlines since 1992. Comendador was 34 years old at that time.

== Bombing ==
=== Setting the bomb ===
Ramzi Yousef boarded the aircraft for the Manila to Cebu leg of the flight. The plane departed from Manila at 5:35 a.m. (UTC+08:00) After the plane was airborne, he went into the lavatory with his toiletry bag in hand and took off his shoes to get out the batteries, wiring, and spark source hidden in the heel below a level where metal detectors in use at the time couldn't detect. Yousef removed a modified Casio F-91W digital watch from his wrist to use as a timer, unpacked the remaining materials from his toiletry bag, and assembled his bomb. He set the timer for four hours later, long after he disembarked and the plane would be far out over the ocean, en route to Tokyo during the next leg of its journey. Once assembled, Yousef put the entire bomb back into his bag, and returned to his assigned seat.

After moving to seat 26K following permission granted by a flight attendant due to his claim that he could get a better view from that seat, Yousef tucked the assembled bomb into the life vest pocket underneath. He had chosen this location based on a misunderstanding of where the fuel tanks were located on that specific 747 configuration. In some 747 configurations, the fuel tank is located underneath the center of the plane – where placement of the bomb would likely have resulted in considerable damage and could have even brought the plane down (similar to the bombing of Pan Am Flight 103 six years earlier). However, the 747 performing the flight had the fuel tank farther back due to its cabin configuration, making seat 26K two rows forward of the center fuel tank. After he had finished planting the bomb, Yousef exited the aircraft in Cebu. Philippine domestic Flight Attendant Maria De La Cruz noticed that Yousef had switched seats during the Manila to Cebu flight and had exited the plane in Cebu alongside the domestic cabin crew, but did not pass this information along to the international flight crew which boarded at Cebu for the trip to Tokyo. In addition to Yousef, 25 other passengers also exited the plane at Cebu, where 256 more passengers and a new cabin crew boarded the plane for the final leg of the flight to Tokyo.

=== Explosion ===
Flight 434 landed in Cebu at 6:50 a.m., after a flight time of 1 hour 15 minutes. At 8:38 a.m., after a 38-minute delay due to airport congestion, the plane took off with a total of 273 passengers on board. Among them was 24-year-old Haruki Ikegami (池上春樹, Ikegami Haruki), a Japanese industrial sewing machine maker returning from a business trip to Cebu, occupying seat 26K. At 11:43 a.m. Japan Standard Time, four hours after Yousef planted his bomb, the device exploded underneath Ikegami's seat, injuring an additional ten passengers in the adjacent seats in front of and behind seat 26K. The blast also blew off a two-square-foot (0.2 m^{2}) portion of the cabin floor leaving a gaping hole leading to the cargo hold location, and the cabin's rapid expansion from the explosion severed a number of control cables in the ceiling that controlled the plane's right aileron, as well as cables that connected to the steering controls of both the Captain and First Officer. Assistant purser Fernando Bayot tried to pull Ikegami out of the hole created by the explosion, but soon Bayot realized that part of Ikegami's lower body was missing, and that Ikegami had died. In order to prevent additional panic, Bayot called another flight attendant over to give the appearance that they were tending to Ikegami's needs with a blanket and oxygen mask, then reported the extent of the passenger injuries to the cockpit.

Masaharu Mochizuki, a passenger on the flight, recalled that passengers, both injured and uninjured, tried to move away from the blast site, but cabin crew told passengers to remain in place until an assessment of the situation could be made. Of the ten passengers who were injured, one needed urgent medical care.

The severity of the disaster was reduced by several mitigating factors. With the 747 utilized on the sector having a modified seating arrangement instead of the standard layout, the hole in the floor beneath the seat punched through to the cargo hold instead of the fuel tank, sparing the plane from exploding. The bomb's orientation, positioned front-to-back and upward angled from horizontal, caused the blast to expand vertically and lengthwise. This spared the plane's outer structure, as Ikegami's body absorbed most of the blast force; the lower half of his body fell into the cargo hold. Additionally, due to the 38-minute delay in takeoff from Cebu, the plane was not as far out to sea as anticipated, which contributed to the captain's available options for an emergency landing.

=== Landing ===
Immediately after the bombing, the aircraft banked hard to the right, but the autopilot quickly fixed the bank. After the blast, Captain Reyes asked Systems Engineer Dexter Comendador to survey the blast area to check for damage. Reyes placed the mayday call, requesting landing at Naha Airport, Okinawa Island, Okinawa Prefecture. The Japanese air traffic controller experienced difficulty in understanding Reyes' request, so American air traffic controllers from a U.S. military base on Okinawa took over and processed Reyes' landing. They directed a USAF Learjet towards PAL 434 to visually check for damage of the outer fuselage and to verify that the landing gear was in place. The autopilot had stopped responding to Reyes' commands and the aircraft flew past Okinawa.

Reyes said in an interview for the Canadian television series Mayday that when he disengaged the autopilot, he feared that the aircraft would bank right again and the crew would lose control of the aircraft; because of the pressing need to land quickly to attend to the injured and inspect the plane for additional damage, however, Reyes instructed First Officer Jaime Herrera to take hold of his own controls and then Reyes deactivated the autopilot. The aircraft did not bank after the disengagement of the autopilot, but neither would it respond to steering inputs from either controller due to the control cable damage caused by the bomb. The crew struggled to use the ailerons, which could allow the aircraft to roll but were still unable to change the plane's direction. After thinking through the different hypothetical methods of control, the crew settled on using asymmetric thrust to control the jet, in a very similar fashion to United Airlines Flight 232's crew five years earlier, because other methods of control were either deemed too risky to attempt, or would not have as much effect.

By using the throttles to steer the plane, reducing air speed to both control the radius of turns and to allow the plane to descend, and dumping fuel to lessen the strain on the landing gear, the captain landed the damaged 747 at Naha Airport at 12:45 p.m., one hour after the bomb exploded. The aircraft's other 272 passengers and 20 crew members survived.

== The bomb ==
U.S. prosecutors said the device was a "Mark II" PETN "microbomb" constructed using Casio digital watches as described in Phase I of the Bojinka plot, for which this was a test. On Flight 434, Yousef used one tenth of the explosive power he planned to use on eleven U.S. airliners in January 1995. All of the bombs components were designed to slip through airport security checks undetected, then be assembled on the flight. The explosive used was liquid nitroglycerin, which was concealed in a bottle of contact lens cleaner fluid.

== Aftermath ==
Manila police were able to track the batteries used in the bomb and many of its contents from Okinawa back to Manila. Police uncovered Yousef's plan on the night of January 6 and the early morning of January 7, 1995, and Yousef was arrested a month later in Pakistan. He was extradited back to the United States to face trial wherein the New York Supreme Court gave him a life sentence with an additional 240 years. Yousef concurrently serves his terms at the ADX Florence prison. Ramzi Yousef's accomplices also received 240 years in prison.

The flight deck and cabin crew members were commended by President Fidel Ramos for their "professional handling of a potentially disastrous situation" and went their separate ways following the incident. Ed Reyes transferred to Cebu Pacific to work as an Administrative Check Pilot, flight instructor, and DC-9 captain until his retirement in 2002. He served as Board Secretary and Director of Airlink International Aviation School, also working as an aviation course professor in the same institution until his death on February 14, 2007, from prostate cancer. First Officer Jaime Herrera was later promoted to Captain and continued to fly for Philippine Airlines until his retirement in 2008. He died on March 27, 2021, at the age of 73. Systems Engineer Dexter Comendador also moved to Cebu Pacific in 1998 and served as a management pilot in that company, then moved to Philippines AirAsia in 2011 where he served as COO and was later appointed as interim CEO in July 2016 and CEO in January 2017. Comendador retired in July 2019.

The aircraft, then registered as EI-BWF, was later converted to a cargo configuration as Boeing 747-283B(SF). It subsequently changed hands several times, always to air cargo companies, and was finally placed in storage in 2007 at Châteauroux-Centre "Marcel Dassault" Airport.

== In popular culture ==
The events of Flight 434 were featured in "Bomb on Board", a Season 3 episode of the Canadian TV series Mayday (called Air Emergency and Air Disasters in the United States and Air Crash Investigation in the UK and elsewhere around the world). Filipino Canadian actor Von Flores portrayed Captain Reyes while Canadian actor and comedian Sam Kalilieh played Ramzi Yousef.

== See also ==
- Thai Airways International Flight 620, a similar incident occurred on a journey from the Philippines to Japan.
- Pan Am Flight 103, Pan Am plane destroyed by bomb, killing 270 people
- 2001 failed shoe bomb attempt, failed al-Qaeda PETN bombing of plane
- 2006 transatlantic aircraft plot, failed plot to blow up at least 10 planes as they flew from Great Britain to the United States and Canada
- Aircraft flight control system
- Cargo planes bomb plot, failed al-Qaeda PETN bombing of plane
- List of terrorist incidents in 1994
- Northwest Airlines Flight 253, failed al-Qaeda PETN bombing of plane
- Pan Am Flight 830, a similar incident that occurred 12 years earlier
