= Abdul Hakim Murad (militant) =

Pakistani terrorist (born 1968)

- عبد الحكيم مراد
- Born: Abdul Hakim Ali Hashim Murad; April 11, 1968 (age 58); Kuwait
- Other name: Ahmed Saeed
- Known for: The Bojinka plot
- Convictions: Conspiracy (x7); Attempting to bomb an aircraft (x12)
- Penalty: Life imprisonment

Details
- Imprisoned at: USP Victorville

Abdul Hakim Ali Hashim Murad (Arabic: عبد الحكيم علي هشام مراد; born April 11, 1968) is a Pakistani Islamist terrorist, who was a co-conspirator in the Bojinka plot—the forerunner to the September 11 attacks. In 1996, he was convicted in the United States of trying to blow up a dozen airliners and was sentenced to life in prison.

He was found to have many aliases. A Pakistani passport found had "Abdul Hakim, student, age 26, Pakistani passport No. C665334, issued in Kuwait." He used the alias Ahmed Saeed when Manila police apprehended him. He was mentioned on Ramzi Yousef's laptop personal computer as Obaid.

He was designated by the Al-Qaida and Taliban Sanctions Committee of the Security Council in 2003.

== Life ==
Murad was born in Kuwait, where his father worked as a crane operator for a petroleum company. After graduating from a Kuwaiti high school, he attained his commercial pilot's license at the Continental Flying School in the Philippines from November 1990 to January 1991, and continued his studies at the Emirates Flying School in the United Arab Emirates in November 1991.

Ramzi Yousef, a friend of Murad's who attended Afghan training camps, taught Murad how to make bombs in Lahore, Pakistan. During one of the practice sessions, a bomb exploded in Yousef's face, impairing vision in one eye.

While they were in Metro Manila in the Philippines, Murad and Yousef often went to two karaoke bars, the XO on Adriatico Street, and the Firehouse on Roxas Boulevard in Pasay. According to Murad, they never went to the mosque.

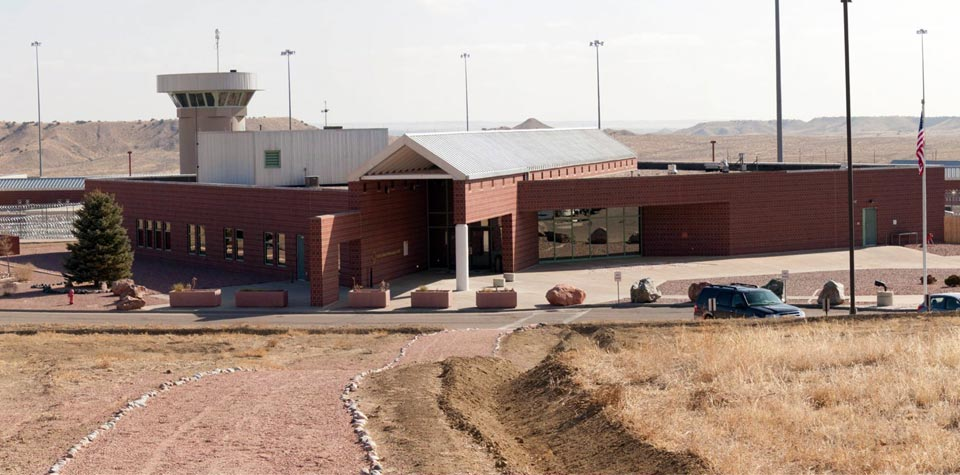
Florence ADMAX USP, where Murad was incarcerated

He attended a series of flight schools, including Emirates Flying School in Dubai, United Arab Emirates, the Alpha Tango Flying Service in San Antonio, Texas, and others in Schenectady, New York; New Bern, North Carolina; Louisiana, and Pasay, Philippines. He later told officials he had attended four different American flight schools. On June 8, 1992, he received a Commercial Pilot certificate while at Coastal Aviation Incorporated, after completing 275 hours of required flight time.

== Bojinka plot ==
Murad was a co-conspirator with Ramzi Yousef who was one of the main perpetrators and creator of the bomb for the 1993 World Trade Center bombing. After moving to the Philippines under the direction of Yousef's uncle Khalid Sheikh Mohammed, they planned the unsuccessful Bojinka Plot which would set the pattern for the later Al Qaeda September 11 attacks. The plan involved assassinating Pope John Paul II during a visit to the Philippines then, while attention was drawn to the Pope's death, bombs would be placed inside toy cars and planted on airline flights out of Bangkok, killing thousands.

After successfully testing and detonating his deadly bomb on Philippine Airlines Flight 434, Yousef returned to Manila and began preparing at least a dozen bombs each with a higher concentration of explosive materials. But just weeks before the Bojinka Plot was due to be launched, Murad was mixing chemicals which started a fire on January 6, 1995. Yousef and Murad fled the fire, but Murad was sent back to retrieve the laptop computer in the apartment, which contained the plans for the attack. He called himself Ahmed Saeed as he was being arrested. He offered 110,740 Philippine pesos ($2,000 U.S. dollars) to the Manila police if they let him go. Although they did not make that much money in a year, Aida Fariscal, the watch commander, refused to let him go. Police grew suspicious after "Saeed" mumbled that, "two Satans that must be destroyed: the Pope and America." This led a further search of room 603, where they found a bomb factory and a computer with data relating to the plot.

Over the course of many weeks, his interrogations by Philippine National Police Intelligence consisted of waterboarding, being beaten with chairs and lumber, and having cigarettes extinguished on his penis and testicles. A Philippine National Police raid in another Manila apartment also revealed evidence that Abdul Murad, Khalid Sheikh Mohammed and Yousef had drawn up plans for flying an airplane into the CIA headquarters. The information was passed on to the FAA who warned individual airlines. As part of the Bojinka plot, Murad was slated to bomb two United Airlines aircraft, and was also slated to be the suicide pilot who would fly a small plane filled with explosives into the CIA headquarters in Langley, Virginia.

Information about plane bombings was sent to the FBI. Abdul Hakim Murad was sent to the United States on April 12, 1995, and would later help convict Yousef based on Murad's testimony. Murad was convicted on September 5, 1996, of seven counts of conspiring and attempting to bomb 12 planes. On May 16, 1998, Murad received a life sentence to prison. Murad, Federal Bureau of Prisons #37437-054, is currently serving his time in USP Victorville, having previously been incarcerated at ADX Florence.
