= Wali Khan Amin Shah =

Saudi born convicted terrorist

- Born: 1967 (age 58–59)
- Released: 3 December 2021
- Citizenship: State less person
- Detained at: FCI Pekin
- Other names: Osama Turkestani; Osama Azmurai; Grabi Ibrahim Hahse

Wali Khan Amin Shah (Arabic: والي خان أمين شاه) (also known as Osama Turkestani, Osama Azmurai, and Grabi Ibrahim Hahsen) is a Saudi man who fought with the Afghan Arabs in Afghanistan, and called for the jihad movement to focus on attacking the United States. He had a role in the foiled Bojinka plot. He was convicted of terrorism and imprisoned on these charges from 1995 to 2021.

== Background ==
Shah was born in Turkestan (now Uzbekistan), having fled with his family to escape the Soviet invasion and settled in Saudi Arabia where he was a stateless person. Shah says he was sent by the Saudi government to fight in Afghanistan and Pakistan.

== Attack on Philippines ==
Shah bombed the Greenbelt Theatre in Manila on December 1, injuring several people. In January 1995, Shah traveled from Pakistan to Manila via Kuala Lumpur and Singapore to rendezvous with Ramzi Yousef.

== Capture and re-capture ==
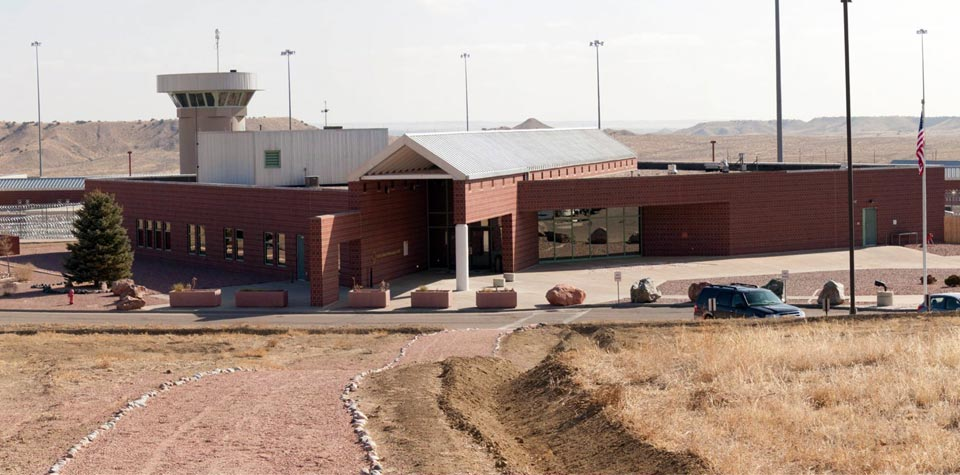
Florence ADMAX USP, where Shah was incarcerated

The Bojinka plot was discovered by police on January 6, 1995. He was arrested by Manila police at an apartment on Singalong Street, which Yousef had set up in case the plot failed, on January 11, but he escaped police custody roughly 77 hours later. After obtaining a fraudulent passport bearing the name Osama Turkestani, he lived on the nearby island of Langkawi until his December 1995 re-arrest in Malaysia. After the re-arrest, he was handed over to United States authorities.

Khan's capture was initially a closely guarded secret, but ABC News correspondent John Miller revealed the news of his arrest during a 1998 interview with Osama bin Laden at an al-Qaeda training camp in Afghanistan. FBI Special Agent John P. O'Neill was initially suspected of leaking the information to his friend Christopher Isham and was nearly indicted by Assistant U.S. Attorney Patrick Fitzgerald, but ABC denied that O'Neill was the source of the information.

Shah was reported to have made an unsuccessful escape attempt from the Metropolitan Correctional Center in Manhattan.

Shah was sentenced to 30 years in federal prison having spent his first 14 years in solitary confinement under very severe conditions due to Special Administrative Measures (SAMs) in ADX Florence, and was later transferred to the Communication Management Unit (CMU) a little less severe in Marion, Illinois.

Shah cooperated with the United States Government since August 1998. Shah, Federal Bureau of Prisons # 42799-054, previously incarcerated at Marion USP, was held at FCI Terre Haute. He was released on September 3, 2021. Since he is a stateless person, Shah will likely remain detained throughout lengthy deportation proceedings, although after six months of detention, the burden shifts to the US government to prove that his removal is possible in the reasonably foreseeable future.On February 15, 2023, Shah was deported to Qatar.

== See also ==
- Mohammed Jamal Khalifa
- Riduan Isamuddin
