= United States v. Khalid Sheikh Mohammed =

Trial of alleged September 11, 2001 attackers

KSM II
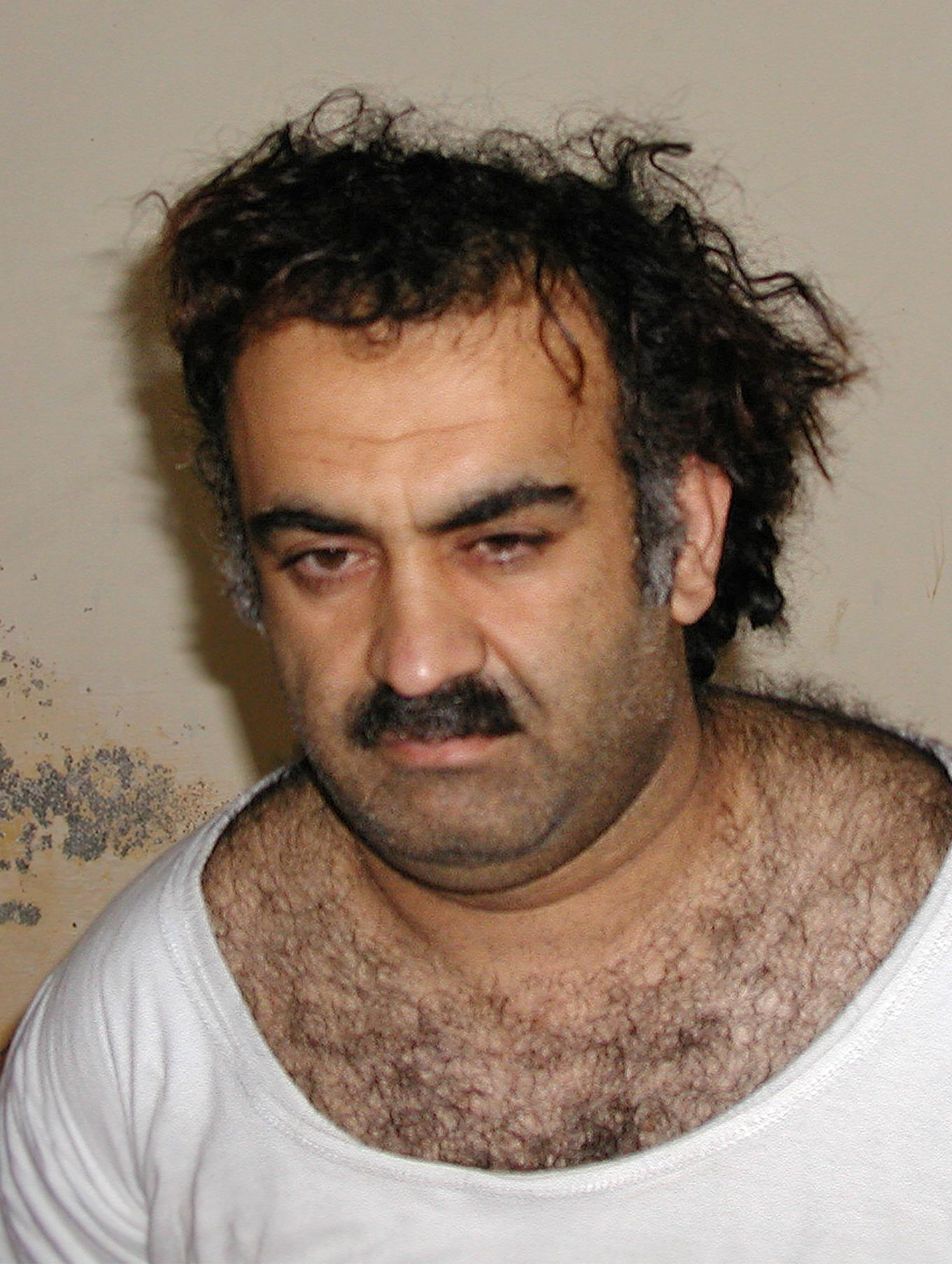
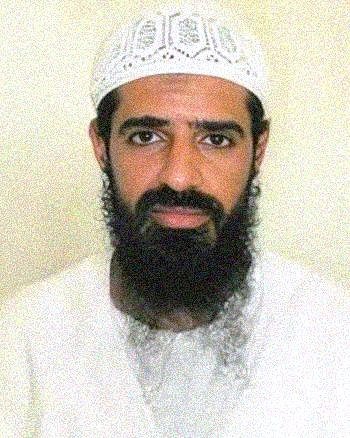
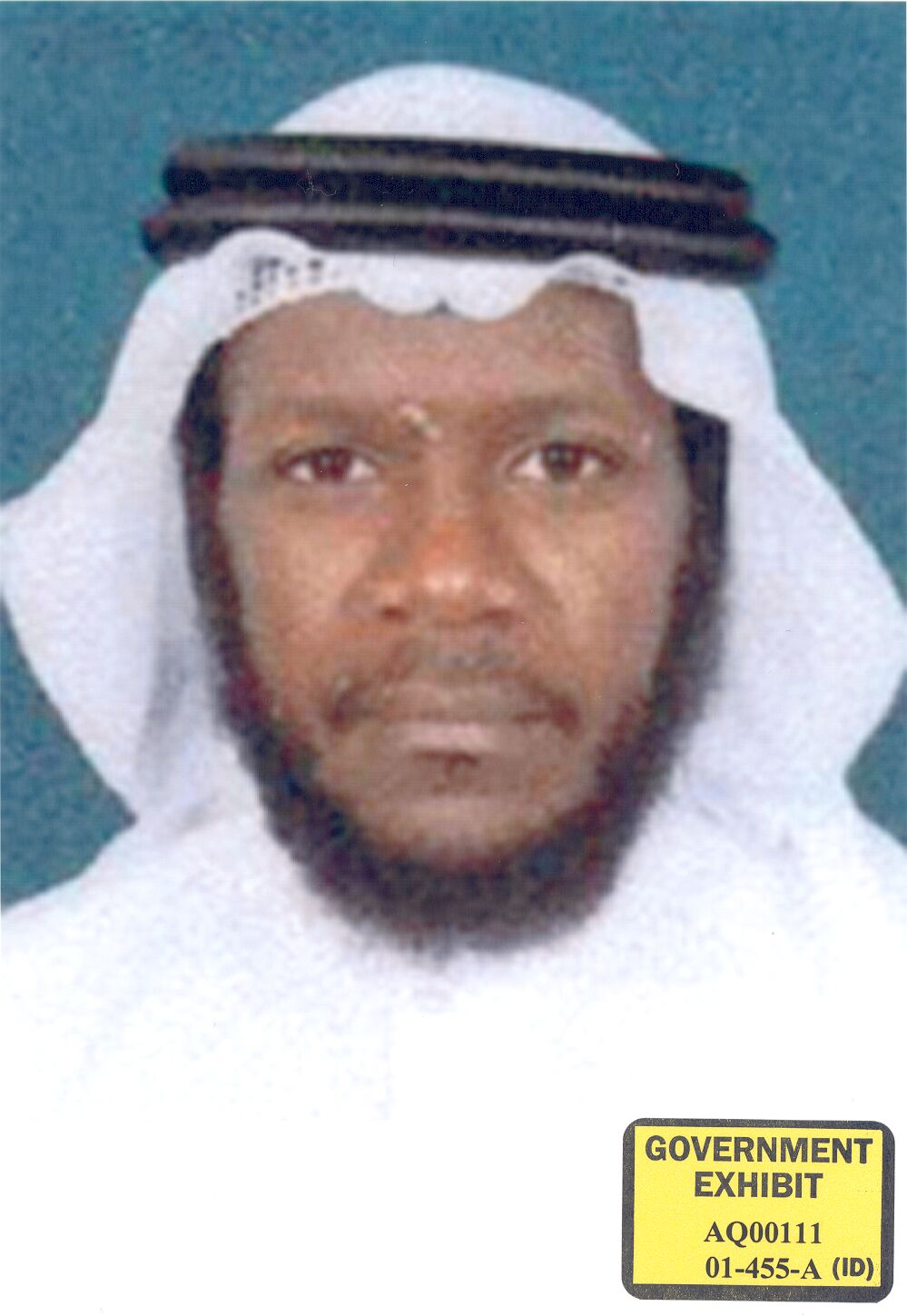
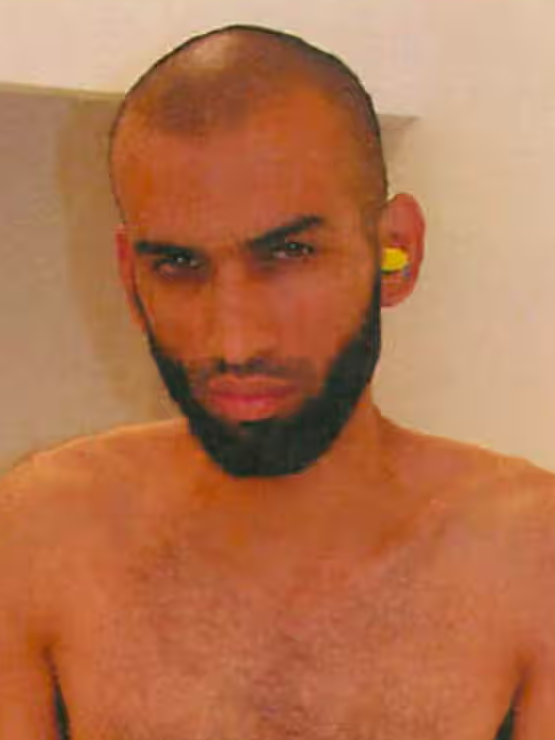
- In order (left to right): Khalid Sheikh Mohammed, Walid bin Attash, Mustafa al-Hawsawi, and Ammar al-Baluchi
- Court: Expeditionary Legal Complex, Guantanamo Bay, Cuba
- Full case name: 9/11: Khalid Shaikh Mohammad et al. (2)

United States v. Khalid Sheikh Mohammed, et al. or KSM II (Note: officially 9/11: Khalid Shaikh Mohammad et al. (2)) is the military commission prosecution of five alleged al-Qaeda members accused of orchestrating the September 11, 2001, attacks. Although initial charges were announced at the Pentagon in February, 2008, the case was refiled in 2011 following a failed attempt to transfer the prosecution to civilian court. The accused are Khalid Sheikh Mohammed, Walid bin Attash, Ramzi bin al-Shibh, Ammar al-Baluchi and Mustafa al-Hawsawi; bin al-Shibh's case was later severed due to competency issues.

The proceedings are held before a U.S. military commission at the Expeditionary Legal Complex in Guantanamo Bay, Cuba. In 2009, the Obama administration planned to transfer the case to the U.S. District Court for the Southern District of New York, but the transfer was effectively barred by congressional restrictions enacted in the 2011 National Defense Authorization Act. The defendants were arraigned in Guantanamo Bay on May 5, 2012. As of 2026, the pretrial proceedings are still ongoing, and with a tentative trial date set for June 5, 2028.

== Charges ==
The five individuals are charged under the military commission system, as established by Congress under the Military Commissions Act of 2006. The charges, which were brought in 2011, are the following: attacking civilians, attacking civilian objects, intentionally causing serious bodily injury, murder in violation of the law of war, destruction of property in violation of the law of war, hijacking or hazarding a vessel or aircraft, terrorism, and providing material support for terrorism. If convicted, they may face the death penalty.

The murder charge involves 2,977 individual counts of murder – one for each person killed in the 9/11 attacks (not including the terrorists that orchestrated the attacks).

== The trial in a military commission ==
This image, the first to be made public following Khalid Sheikh Mohammed's capture, stirred controversy because Janet Hamlin, the courtroom illustrator, was called upon to redraw the image when Mohammed said the original version made his nose too large.

On February 11, 2008, at a Pentagon press briefing, original charges were announced by Brigadier General Thomas W. Hartmann against six accused. By the time charges were "referred" (the military procedural equivalent of an indictment) in May 2008, there were only five accused. Later, it was revealed that the military commission Convening Authority (Susan Crawford, at the time) who referred the charges had seen evidence that the additional detainee originally charged, Mohammed al-Qahtani, had been tortured in military custody. Crawford determined that, as a result, he could not be prosecuted.

The trial was first presided over by military judge Colonel Ralph Kohlmann. The trial began on June 5, 2008, with the arraignment. Court personnel, prosecutors, defense attorneys, victims and family members of victims, as well as members of the press and non-governmental organizations, all traveled to Guantanamo Naval Station for the arraignment.

The U.S. Department of Defense has built a $12 million "Expeditionary Legal Complex" in Guantánamo with a courtroom designed to protect classified information, and capable of trying the alleged co-conspirators before one judge and jury. Only members of the defense teams of each of the five defendants, the prosecution team, court staff, and jury members may enter the courtroom itself. Media and other observers may watch unclassified proceedings only, sequestered in a room behind thick glass, located at the back of the large court facility. The sound from the courtroom to the spectator gallery is delayed 40 seconds, to allow the judge or court security officer to cut the sound feed, when necessary to protect classified information.

The death penalty against any of the accused requires the unanimous agreement of the members of the commission. Members of a military commission must all be active duty U.S. military officers.

At the 2008 arraignment, Mohammed insisted he would not be represented by any attorneys. The other detainees quickly followed suit and said they too wanted to represent themselves, although the judge did not allow them to do so. One of the civilian attorneys Mohammed spurned, David Nevin, later told the Associated Press that he would attempt to meet with Mohammed to "hear him out and see if we can give him information that is helpful".

Mohammed lost his composure after the judge ordered several defense attorneys to keep quiet, saying in broken English, "It's an inquisition. It's not a trial. After torturing they transfer us to inquisition-land in Guantanamo."

Mohammed stated that he believes only in Sharia law and railed against U.S. president George W. Bush for waging a "crusade war". When the judge warned Mohammed that he will face execution if convicted of organizing the attacks, Mohammed said he welcomes the death penalty, stating that "Yes, this is what I wish, to be a martyr for a long time. I will, God willing, have this, by you."

A sound feed to journalists from the courtroom was turned off twice.

The sound was also turned off when another defendant discussed early days of his imprisonment. Judge Ralph Kohlmann said that in both cases the sound was turned off because classified information was discussed.

On September 23, 2008, in the voir dire process, Mohammed questioned the judge on his potential bias at trial.

On October 12, 2008, Kohlmann ruled that Mohammed and his four co-charged should be provided with laptops so they can work on their defenses.

== Kohlmann unexpectedly replaced ==
Kohlmann was scheduled to retire in 2009. In November 2008, he was unexpectedly replaced by Stephen Henley.

== Revoked guilty plea ==
On December 8, 2008, Khalid Sheikh Mohammed and his four co-defendants told the judge that they wished to confess and plead guilty to all charges. The plea was to be delayed until mental competency hearings for Mustafa Ahmad al-Hawsawi and Ramzi bin al-Shibh could be held regarding which Mohammed said, "We want everyone to plead together." Spencer Ackerman, writing in the Washington Independent, reported that Presiding Officer Stephen Henley had to consider whether he was authorized to accept guilty pleas.

On July 31, 2024, Mohammed, Attash, and al-Hawsawi agreed to plead guilty. Their plea deals were revoked by secretary of defense Lloyd Austin two days later.

== Transfer of the case to a civilian court ==
In July 2009, US attorney general Eric Holder assigned eight experienced criminal prosecutors to build the best criminal case they could against Khalid Sheikh Mohammed and his co-conspirators. His prosecutors, Holder said, had "constructed a case that uses materials and evidence that does not derive from the techniques that were controversial", which would "maximize our chances for success". It was a major concern to Holder that the case not rest on torture. "It's a statement about what this Administration is about", he said. "It's a statement about this Attorney General. We are not going to use the products of interrogation techniques that this President has banned."

On November 13, 2009, Eric Holder announced that Khalid Sheikh Mohammed, Ramzi bin al-Shibh, Walid bin Attash, Ali Abdul Aziz Ali and Mustafa Ahmed al-Hawsawi will all be transferred to the U.S. District Court for the Southern District of New York for trial. He also expressed confidence that an impartial jury would be found "to ensure a fair trial in New York".

A rally near the federal court building in Foley Square, in lower Manhattan, was held on December 5, 2010, at which the decision to transfer the case to a civilian court was severely criticized. It was organized, in part, by Debra Burlingame, the sister of the pilot Charles Burlingame, who was killed when Al Qaeda hijackers crashed the plane he had been flying into the Pentagon. Burlingame is one of the three founders of Keep America Safe, a political-advocacy group. Andrew McCarthy, the former Chief Assistant U.S. Attorney who led the prosecution of the 1993 World Trade Center attack, spoke at this rally declaring that Eric Holder didn't "understand what rule of law has always been in wartime". He said, "It's military commissions. It's not to wrap our enemies in our Bill of Rights."

In a letter to President Barack Obama, Dianne Feinstein, the chair of the Senate Intelligence Committee, suggested that holding a trial in New York was dangerous. "New York City has been a high-priority target since at least the first World Trade Center bombing", she wrote. "The trial of the most significant terrorist in custody would add to the threat."

On January 21, 2010, all charges have been withdrawn in the military commissions against the five suspects in the September 11, 2001, terror attacks being held at Guantanamo Bay. The charges were dropped "without prejudice" – a procedural move that allows federal officials to transfer the individuals to trial in a civilian court and also allows for the possibility, if necessary, of bringing charges again in military commissions.

In February 2010, White House spokesman Robert Gibbs on CNN said that he expects Mohammed to be found guilty and executed. "Khalid Sheikh Mohammed is going to meet justice and he's going to meet his maker. He will be brought to justice and he's likely to be executed for the heinous crimes he committed." The White House spokesperson's statement has been criticized as violating the principle of the presumption of innocence and has been characterized as egregious by an attorney of Guantanamo Bay detainees.

In February 2010, Fox News reported that the legal counsel of Khalid Sheikh Mohammed, and the legal counsel of several other captives, was halted without warning. The attorneys had made the trip to Guantanamo in the usual manner, advising authorities of the purpose of their trip. However, upon their arrival in Guantanamo, they were informed they were no longer allowed to see their clients. They were told that letters they had written to their clients could not be delivered, as they were no longer authorized to write to their clients. Camp authorities told them that since the charges against their clients had been dropped while the Department of Justice determined where to charge them, they no longer needed legal counsel. Camp authorities told them that all future access to the captives had to be approved by Jeh Johnson, the Department of Defense's General Counsel. Fox reported that during earlier periods when the charges had been dropped the captives had still been allowed to see their attorneys. Fox claimed that questions they asked camp authorities lead to the captives' access to their attorneys being restored.

== Transfer of the case back to a military commission ==
On January 7, 2011, US president Barack Obama signed the National Defense Authorization Act which explicitly prohibits the use of US Defense Department funds to transfer detainees from Guantanamo Bay to the United States or other countries. It also bars Pentagon funds from being used to build facilities in the United States to house detainees, as the president originally suggested. The move essentially barred the administration from trying detainees in civilian courts. The president objected to the provision in the bill before signing it, calling it "a dangerous and unprecedented challenge to critical executive branch authority" but also said his team would work with the US Congress to "seek repeal of these restrictions".

On April 4, 2011, Attorney General Eric Holder announced that Khalid Sheikh Mohammed and four other 9/11 terror suspects will face a military trial at the Guantanamo Bay detention facility. In announcing his decision, Holder criticized Congress for imposing restrictions on the Justice Department's ability to bring the men to New York for civilian trials. "After thoroughly studying the case, it became clear to me that the best venue for prosecution was in federal court. I stand by that decision today", Holder said. "As the president has said, those unwise and unwarranted restrictions (imposed by Congress) undermine our counterterrorism efforts and could harm our national security. Decisions about who, where and how to prosecute have always been – and must remain – the responsibility of the executive branch." Holder insisted, "We were prepared to bring a powerful case against Khalid Sheikh Mohammed and his four co-conspirators – one of the most well-researched and documented cases I have ever seen in my decades of experience as a prosecutor." He added, "Had this case proceeded in Manhattan or in an alternative venue in the United States, as I seriously explored in the past year, I am confident that our justice system would have performed with the same distinction that has been its hallmark for over 200 years." Holder had promised to seek the death penalty for each of the five men and on 4 April he warned that it is an "open question" if such a penalty can be imposed by a military commission if the defendants plead guilty.

=== Pretrial (2012-Present) ===
On May 5, 2012, the defendants were arraigned. A small number of 9/11 victims' relatives were attending the hearing. Proceedings were delayed as one of the defendants, Waleed bin Attash, appeared in court while restrained in his chair. The restraints were later removed after defense counsel had given assurances that he would "behave". Khalid Sheikh Mohammed refused to answer the judge's questions. All the defendants refused to wear earphones providing translation into Arabic; the hearing was delayed and could only be resumed upon the arrival of an Arabic translator.

The trial is conducted in a specially-built courtroom at Guantanamo. Witnesses may see the proceedings through soundproof glass and hear an audio feed that is time-delayed 40 seconds. When classified material is mentioned in the court, the Court can press a censorship button to cut the audio feed to the observers and "illuminate a red light on the judge's bench".

On August 10, 2012, the government filed a pleading describing an ex parte motion seeking permission of the military commission to destroy a military black site where the accused were imprisoned. In response, the defense filed dozens of discovery requests and motions to compel. On August 12, 2013, the military commission ruled that information related to the black site would be admissible as evidence in court, and protected under the law as such.

On January 28, 2013, during a pretrial hearing, "the sound system in the courtroom was suddenly cut, to the surprise of even the judge", as if the "censorship button" was pressed, audio feed was cut and the red light was illuminated. When the audio feed resumed, trial judge Col. James L. Pohl said, "Note for the record that the 40-second delay was initiated not by me. I'm curious as to why. If some external body is turning the commission off under their own view what ought to be with no reason or explanation, then we are going to have a little meeting about who turns that light on or off." The external agency was later revealed to be the CIA. The Miami Herald reported that "the judge ... was clearly furious."

All four accused refused to enter a plea and Khalid Sheikh Mohammed refused to answer the judge's questions, which his lawyer said he was doing in protest at his alleged torture, and because he believed the tribunal was unfair.

In August 2013, defense attorneys refused to sign a Memorandum of Understanding that would have required them to treat their clients' accounts of torture as classified, arguing that it would violate the United Nations Convention Against Torture. [https://yalelawjournal.org/pdf/1194_9kewy88j.pdf]

In January 2014, a 36-page manifesto by Mohammed was published by the Huffington Post. On March 3, the prosecutor asked Pohl to investigate “how this letter was released, and to take action to ensure that the Commission process cannot be used to inappropriately disseminate propaganda.”

In April 2014, it was revealed that the FBI approached a member of the defense team of al-Shibh and had the contractor sign an agreement. The defense asked Pohl to delay the pretrial hearings and start investigating the FBI’s involvement. The pretrial hearings were halted. Judge Pohl ordered the appointment of a conflict-free Independent Counsel for defendant Ramzi bin al-Shibh, tasked with advising bin al-Shibh on the potential conflict of interest arising from the FBI's investigation. [https://www.nimj.org/uploads/1/3/5/5/135587129/nimj_vol_6_carpenter_edit_nov_29.pdf] The defense lawyers asked the judge how can they advise their clients at all if they are uncertain whether serious conflicts of interests (such as an FBI investigation of the lawyers) might prevent them from giving the clients unbiased and confidential advice.

In June 2014, the military commission issued an ex parte order authorizing the substitution of documented evidence provided by the government, in lieu of preserving the black site for further investigation. The military commission also required that the defense team be notified of the impending destruction of the CIA "black site" secret prison and the evidence around it. However, the black site was destroyed in 2014, and the defense team was not notified until 2016. In response, the prosecution stated this error was "simple miscommunication, resulting in inaction", between the military commission and government, each believing the task of notifying the defense team was that of the other.

In October 2014, Mohammed and his four codefendants petitioned the commission to ban female guards from touching them. Attorneys for Mohammad and his codefendants argued that their Muslim faith forbids any contact between them and women other than their wives and immediate female relatives; therefore, physical contact with female guards limits the accused free exercise of religion and causes undue physical and mental harm. The defense argued the use of female guards is in violation of statutory and constitutional protections under domestic law, as well as additional protections under international humanitarian law. Request for relief was explicitly sought under the Religious Freedom Restoration Act of 1993, which states that "the Government may not 'substantially burden' an individual's free exercise of religion except when the burden is in furtherance of a 'compelling governmental interest' and is the 'least restrictive means' of pursuing the compelling interest".

On January 7, 2015, presiding Judge Col. James L. Pohl granted a temporary order "limiting the use of female guards to physically touch" Mohammad and his codefendants, "during movements to and from attorney-client meetings and Commission hearings, absent exigent circumstances, until such time the Commission makes a final ruling".

On July 8, 2016, Judge Pohl rescinded the temporary order, citing that under the Religious Freedom Restoration Act, the United States government has legitimate interests in "gender-neutral staffing to promote detention facility security, full integration of women into the Armed Forces, and prevention of gender discrimination".

On May 10, 2016, defense attorneys for Mohammad filed a motion for recusal of the military judge and current prosecution team, in response to the ex parte order leading to the "secret destruction of evidence with important guilt phase and mitigation value, despite a public order not to". On August 19, 2016, defense attorneys submitted a request "seeking all documents and information regarding the authorization for and destruction of the black site" including all actions taken by the government concerning the issue, communications between all parties involved, and documentation regarding any efforts taken by the government to notify the defense team about destruction of the black site. The motion was denied.

On September 28, 2016, the defense team filed a subject motion to compel discovery, or to dismiss all charges. On January 17, 2017, Judge Pohl granted this motion in part: the government is to provide the defense team with specified information from a limited number of classified documents pertaining to the decommission of the black site. All other requests for compelling discovery were denied, as was the request for dismissal of charges.

On August 8, 2017, the U.S. Court of Appeals for the D.C. Circuit unanimously ordered the disqualification and recusal of Judge Scott L. Silliman from the Guantánamo military commission appeals panel. The court ruled that his past media statements, including a 2010 interview referring to Mohammed and his co-defendants as major conspirators, created an appearance of bias regarding the guilt of the 9/11 defendants, explicitly violating the Rules for Military Commissions as established in the Military Commissions Act.

On February 5, 2018, Defense Secretary James Mattis fired the Convening Authority, Harvey Rishikof, as he was exploring plea deals to end the death penalty. The defense argued this was unlawful command influence. [https://www.mc.mil/Portals/0/pdfs/KSM2/KSM%20II%20(AE555EEE).pdf]

In August 2018, Judge Pohl ruled that because the government had blocked the defense from investigating the CIA's torture program, the government could not use the FBI "Clean Team" confessions against the defendants. He shortly retired from the military and the case. The blanket ban was effectively set aside to be litigated defendant-by-defendant, dragging the proceedings out for several more years.

Marine Col. Keith A. Parrella replaced Army Col. James L. Pohl in August 2018 to preside over the case. However, defense lawyers challenged Judge Parrella’s appointment for a conflict of interest as he was a DOJ Counterterrorism Section fellow between July 2014 to July 2015. [https://www.mc.mil/Portals/0/pdfs/KSM2/KSM%20II%20(AE001B((Col%20Parrella%20Bio)).pdf] Parrella left the case in June 2019 and was replaced by Col. Shane Cohen.

On August 30, 2019, Judge W. Shane Cohen set the trial to begin on January 11, 2021. Finding that the case "will face a host of administrative and logistics challenges requiring coordination between [the prosecution, the defense], the Convening Authority, classified information equity holders, and installation management officials", the commission also introduced a scheduling order for the trial.

In January 2020, CIA psychologist Dr. James Mitchell testified in open court, and his partner, Dr. Bruce Jessen, testified during subsequent hearings. The two former military psychologists were contracted by the CIA in 2002 to design and implement the enhanced interrogation techniques used at black sites.

In March 2020, Judge Cohen resigned, citing family concerns. The chief judge of the military commissions judiciary, Army Col. Douglas K. Watkins oversaw it on a temporary basis until Col. Stephen F. Keane was assigned to the case on September 7. However, he recused himself on October 2. Watkins oversaw the case again temporarily, briefly appointing Army Col. Matthew N. McCall in October 2020; however, McCall was disqualified because he did not meet the requirement of having two full years of prior judicial experience. Watkins then reappointed himself to run the bench through early 2021, until McCall took over the case permanently in September 2021 after gaining the required judicial experience.

On September 7, 2021, pre-trial hearings resumed after a break of a year and a half due to the COVID-19 pandemic and personnel changes.

In December 2022, hearings were further postponed into 2023, with speculation that they may be delayed even more as the Biden administration weighs a possible plea deal that would take the death penalty off the table. This news attracted criticism from Republicans, with US Representative Jim Jordan tweeting, "Joe Biden's allies are negotiating lesser sentences for 9/11 attackers. If they won't punish terrorists, how can we trust them to lock up criminals in your neighborhood?"

In a letter dated August 1, 2023, Pentagon officials informed families of 9/11 victims of the possibility of a plea agreement which would spare the lives of the accused.

On September 21, 2023, Air Force Col. Matthew McCall severed Ramzi bin al-Shibh from the case after a three-member panel of mental health professionals found him incompetent to stand trial due to PTSD and persecutory delusion, leaving four defendants. He has remained in detention indefinitely.

On July 31, 2024, the US Department of Defense announced that plea agreements have been reached with the remaining four defendants. As part of the agreements, the defendants would withdraw certain motions and waive all waivable motions, and the government agreed not to seek the death penalty.

On August 2, 2024, the US Secretary of Defense Lloyd J. Austin III announced in a memo that he has the sole authority to enter into pretrial agreements, and withdrew from the agreements on July 31. It generated controversy, with some legal scholars such as Yale Law School's Eugene R. Fidell describing the action as illegal.

On November 6, 2024, Col. Matthew N. McCall, a military court judge, ruled that Austin acted too late and outside his authority when he rescinded the plea deals.

On December 30, 2024, the U.S. Court of Military Commission Review, the intermediate military appeals court, affirmed McCall's ruling.

The prosecution appealed to the U.S. Court of Appeals for the D.C. Circuit. On January 9, 2025, the DC Circuit granted an emergency stay.

On April 11, 2025, Judge McCall issued a 111-page decision throwing out the January 2007 confessions al-Baluchi made to FBI "clean teams" at Guantánamo Bay, ruling that the prosecution had failed to prove the confessions were voluntary. Prosecutors appealed McCall's decision to the U.S. Court of Military Commission Review (USCMCR), which heard oral arguments on February 27, 2026. The appeal remained pending as of May 2026.

On July 11, 2025, the US Court of Appeals for the DC Circuit reversed both rulings by the lower courts in a 2-1 decision, ruling that Austin had the legal authority to withdraw from the pretrial agreements. Judges Patricia Millett and Neomi Rao concurred, and Judge Robert Wilkins dissented.

On January 7, 2026, the U.S. Court of Appeals for the District of Columbia Circuit declined to reconsider a ruling that threw out previous plea agreements. This decision left the 2025 appellate ruling in place that allowed the Pentagon to withdraw the earlier plea deals. Following this, the Supreme Court is the final potential venue for defense appeals to reinstate the plea deal.

On March 25, 2026, defense lawyers filed an application with the Supreme Court seeking an extension to file a petition for a writ of certiorari, aiming to extend the filing deadline from April 6, 2026, to June 5, 2026.

On August 28, 2026, the trial judge, Lt. Col. Michael Schrama, ruled that statements Mohammed made to FBI "clean team" agents at Guantánamo Bay in 2007 were not given voluntarily and could not be used against him at trial. Prosecutors had described those interrogations as the government's most important evidence in the case. In a 45-page ruling that was not immediately released publicly, Schrama wrote that the prosecution had "failed to prove by a preponderance of the evidence that Mr. Mohammad's statements to the FBI were voluntarily given", citing an "unbroken continuation of the CIA's psychological conditioning and severe coercion" at the time of the 2007 questioning and finding that FBI agents had intentionally failed to tell Mohammed explicitly that he had a right to remain silent and to consult a lawyer and that what he said could be used against him at a trial.

The chief prosecutor, Rear Admiral Aaron C. Rugh, said his office would review the ruling and decide whether to appeal. Schrama gave prosecutors five days to make that decision, with the option of requesting five more, and had not yet ruled on the admissibility of statements made by bin Attash and al-Hawsawi. The prosecutorial team declined not to appeal the ruling to avoid potential trial delays.

On October 2, Judge Schrama suppressed al-Hawsawi's January 2007 FBI confessions, and also suppressed bin Attash's 2007 and 2008 statements made to federal agents on October 7. Thus, the prosecution has lost the FBI "clean team" confessions for all four defendants facing capital prosecution, as Ammar al-Baluchi’s confession was suppressed in April 2025; KSM on August 28, 2026; al-Hawsawi on October 2, 2026; and bin Attash on October 7, 2026.

On October 19, 2026, the U.S. Supreme Court issued an unsigned order declining to hear the appeal of 9/11 defendants Khalid Sheikh Mohammed, Walid bin 'Atash, and Mustafa al-Hawsawi, leaving in place a lower court ruling that blocked their 2024 plea agreements.

As of October 2026, the case remains in the pretrial phase.

== Resignation of Major Jason Wright ==
In 2011, US Army Captain Jason Wright was appointed to serve as Mohammed's military counsel. In April 2014, Wright went on record that he felt the United States Army was making him choose between his military career and his responsibilities to his client when it sought to reassign him. Wright described how he had spent the previous three years building a rapport with Mohammed, and that the military would undermine his right to a fair trial by reassigning him. Wright said he had no choice under the Sixth Amendment's right to counsel other than to resign his Army commission and continue to represent Mohammed as a civilian.

Wright was promoted from Captain to Major in September 2012. Army lawyers normally attend a year of graduate school, when they are promoted to Major. While most officers take that year of schooling immediately, Wright followed the procedure to apply for a deferral of his training. He received a one-year deferral but was denied a referral by The Judge Advocate General the next year after Jason Wright and the 9/11 capital defense teams discovered and spoke out against allegations of governmental misconduct, to include "the release of a half-million defense attorney emails to prosecutors, the discovery of hidden microphones placed by the FBI in attorney-client conference rooms, and allegations that FBI agents have been spying on defense teams.

== Role of Gina Haspel ==
On January 8, 2019, Carol Rosenberg of the Miami Herald reported that partially redacted transcripts from a pre-trial hearing seemed to indicate that Gina Haspel had been the "Chief of Base" of a clandestine CIA detention site at the Guantanamo Bay Naval Station in the 2003–2004 period.
