= Jalozai =

Place in Khyber Pakhtunkhwa, Pakistan

- Location within Khyber Pakhtunkhwa Location within Pakistan
- Country: Pakistan
- Province: Khyber-Pakhtunkhwa
- District: Nowshera District
- Time zone: UTC+5 (PST)

Jalozai (Pashto: جلوزی), also Jallozai, Jailozai, and Jelazee, is a new housing scheme in Nowshera District of Khyber Pakhtunkhwa, Pakistan, located about 35 kilometres southeast of Peshawar near the Afghanistan–Pakistan border. It was used before 2008 as an Afghan refugee camp.

== Overview ==
Jalozai is located in Pabbi Tehsil of Nowshera District in Khyber Pakhtunkhwa Pakistan. The most notable attraction of Jalozai are the University of Engineering and Technology Peshawar campus, which was constructed at the cost of Rs.5.56 Billion on a 400-acre land, and the Jalozai Refugee Camp.

== Jalozai Refugee Camp ==
It was one of the largest of 150 refugee or transit camps in Pakistan, holding Afghan refugees from the 1980s Soviet invasion of Afghanistan. It had an estimated 70,000 refugees at its peak. New Jalozai adjoined the original Jalozai camp in November 2000, taking in a new wave of arriving Afghan refugees. The camps briefly received an additional influx of refugees in the period after 9/11, leading up to the United States invasion of Afghanistan in October 2001. After the fall of the Taliban, the vast majority of refugees in the Jalozai camp returned home or were relocated elsewhere. In February 2002, with a remaining population of 800, Jalozai camp was formally closed. But some problem elements remained through at least 2003, necessitating Pakistani military raids on the former camp that year. By 2012 Pakistan banned extensions to all foreign visas and continued its effort to close the remaining refugee camps.

American intelligence analysts alleged, during the Administrative Review Board hearing of Guantanamo detainee Adel Hassan Hamad, that the camp was directed by Zahid Al-Sheikh, an older brother of senior al Qaeda planner Khalid Sheikh Mohammed. American analysts allege that Zahid Al-Sheikh was also an extremist with ties to terrorism.

Hamad acknowledged that when he first started working for the Hira Islamic Institute Al-Sheikh was the director of Lajnat Al-Da'wa al Islamia, and his ultimate boss, but he was never the director of the Jelazee Refugee Camp. He said that while his relationship with him was a distant business relationship he never saw any clue that Al-Sheikh was an extremist, or tied to terrorism.

Médecins Sans Frontières reported that the camp was closed in early 2002. It called the camp "infamous", and recounted that it had been known as "a living cemetery".

In a report in the Pakistani newspaper Dawn, published in late December 2001, an Afghan refugee named Haji Dost Mohammad, who was then in charge of the camp's security, reported that Osama bin Laden had made a food delivery to the camp in the late 1980s.

“He may have lived in Peshawar, but I never had close contacts with him. Once he came to the camp, 14 years ago, to deliver dates. He came only once. I haven’t seen him since, and at the time I didn’t know who he was.”

== 1979 Soviet invasion ==
After 1979, Peshawar served as a political centre for anti-Soviet Mujahideen, and became surrounded by huge camps of Afghan refugees. Many of the Afghan refugees fled through the historic Khyber Pass, near Peshawar. That major border city of a million people then replaced Kabul and Kandahar as the centre of ethnic Pashtuns (Pakhtuns) cultural development during the 1980s.

Osama bin Laden was identified as a visitor to the Jalozai camp in the 1980s on one occasion. Bin Laden had been based around Peshawar since 1981, where he and Dr. Abdullah Yusuf Azzam were running a large contingent of foreign Arabs and material support involved in the Afghan resistance. Haji Dost Mohammad, the Jalozai security chief, and also a resident of Peshawar since 1979, recalled in a Reuters interview in 2001 that Osama bin Laden had visited Jalozai camp in 1987. According to Mr. Mohammad, "Once he came to the camp, 14 years ago, to deliver dates. He came only once. I haven't seen him since, and at the time I didn't know who he was."

After the Soviet defeat in 1989, many of the Afghan refugees remained in Jalozai and in other Pakistan camps throughout the subsequent civil war and ensuing Afghan rule by the Taliban.

=== November 2000 New Jalozai ===
In October 2000, the USS Cole bombing by al-Qaeda brought many relief agencies to Pakistan, in anticipation of a new exodus of Afghan refugees. The expected retaliation from the United States government then came. Though it was limited to cruise missiles fired into al-Qaeda training camps in the mountains of eastern Afghanistan, the expected wave of new refugees also followed.

The old Jalozai camp continued to contain thousands of refugees from the 1980s and 1990s conflicts. But in November 2000, the "New Jalozai" camp was also established, next to the existing old Jalozai camp. Doctors Without Borders/Médecins Sans Frontières (MSF) began working in New Jalozai in November 2000. Since that time, an additional 50,000 refugees arrived in the Peshawar area, and had settled in the New Jalozai refugee camp through the nine months ending in July 2001.

At the start of 2001, there were nearly 150 refugee camps in Pakistan with some 1.1 million Afghan residents in the camps. Just over 3 million Afghans lived in Pakistan overall, including the camps.

By late 2001, the combined Jalozai refugee camps were estimated by Reuters to have been home to 300,000 Afghans in total during various times over more than two decades. Most sources put the camp population at 70,000 refugees at its peak.

But through July 2001, the combined Jalozai camp was still merely a makeshift transit point. It did not have formal UN status as a refugee camp. No registration had ever taken place in the camp, so substandard living conditions prevailed for the tens of thousands of refugees at Jalozai.

In mid-2001, before the September 11, 2001 attacks on the United States, 10,000 of the Afghans in the Jalozai camp were recognized and registered as genuine refugees by the United Nations High Commissioner for Refugees (UNHCR) and transferred to the new Shamshatoo refugee camp outside the city of Peshawar according to UNHCR spokesperson Melita Sunjic.

=== 2002 camp closures and returnees ===
By early 2002, 50,000 had been relocated from Jalozai camp. Many of those had returned home to Afghanistan following the removal of the Taliban from power in late 2001.

Most of the other former residents of the Jalozai camp had relocated to six new camps built in Pakistan's Khyber Pakhtunkhwa since September 11, 2001, including Kotkai, Bajaur, Shalman, Old Bagzai, Basu, and Ashgaru.

On February 11, 2002, the UNHCR said that the Jalozai refugee camp would be closed the next day, on February 12, 2002. Then a statement by the United Nations refugee agency said that UNHCR deputy representative to Pakistan Eva Demant and commissioner for Afghan refugees would officially close the site.

As of February 11, 2002, the roughly 800 refugees remaining in Jalozai were scheduled to be transferred to Barkili close to the Afghan border on the following day.

In March 2002, the UN refugee agency began a voluntary repatriation campaign in Pakistan. By the end of 2002, UNHCR had repatriated 1.53 million Afghan refugees from Pakistan, including 1.4 million from Khyber Pakhtunkhwa. 82% were from urban areas; only 3% were from new camps, which had been created in anticipation of the October 2001 US coalition invasion.

UNHCR emphasis in 2003 was on repatriation from old camps and cities in Pakistan to rural areas in Afghanistan. 70% of returnees from Pakistan were from cities and 30% from camps.

On March 9, 2003, Pakistani security forces carried out raids in Jalozai refugee camp near Peshawar. The forces also raided nearby Shamshatoo camp. No one was detained.

2004 returnees were 385,000 from Pakistan.

2005 UNHCR plans called for 400,000 Afghan refugees to return home from Pakistan. As of early April 2005, 11,000 Afghans had returned home. 7,000 returned from Pakistan since assisted returns resumed in March. Returns were climbing closer to 500 a day from 250 in March. Numbers were expected to swell as the weather warmed into the summer. UNHCR was then planning, with Pakistan, for perhaps 1.5 million refugees who would stay after termination of the tripartite refugee return agreement in March 2006.

In 2005, with more Afghans drawn home by improving conditions, all the "new" camps in Pakistan established to shelter Afghans anticipated to be fleeing the 2001 war in Afghanistan had been closed. More than 580,000 Afghans had gone home from the camps since the UN's voluntary repatriation programme began in 2002.

As of 2005, camp closures continued in parallel with the UNHCR repatriation operation that began in March 2002 and helped 2.4 million Afghan refugees from Pakistan to go home, the agency's largest such programme anywhere in the world.

The region was rocked severely by the catastrophic 2005 Kashmir earthquake.

In 2012 Pakistan continued its effort to close the remaining refugee camps in the country and banned extensions of all foreign visas, including Afghanistan, leading to a mass number of returnees.

== Jalozai Special Economic Zone ==
In July 2020, KP Chief Minister Mehmood Khan officially launched the Jalozai Special Economic Zone in the Nowshera District.

== See also ==
- Afghan refugees
- United Nations High Commissioner for Refugees (UNHCR)
- Demography of Pakistan
