= Lajnat Al-Da'wa al Islamia =

Islamic organization of Kuwait

Lajnat Al-Da'wa al Islamia (LDI, also known as the “Islamic Call Committee”) is a Muslim non-governmental organization based in Kuwait. It says that it is a humanitarian aid organization. It has provided aid in Afghanistan and other areas of western Asia.

In the fall of 2001 United States President George W. Bush issued Executive Order 13224, which listed several dozen organizations that American intelligence analysts asserted were tied to terrorism. This included Lajnat Al-Da'wa al Islamia' (LDI), which American intelligence analysts said had provided logistic support to terrorist groups.

== LDI and the Guantanamo captives ==
Because of these assertions, American intelligence analysts used individual's ties to Lajnat Al-Da'wa al Islamia as among justifications for detention at Guantanamo Bay detention camp. It transferred terrorist suspects here after the invasion of Afghanistan in fall 2001.

For instance, during the Administrative Review Board hearing of Adel Hassan Hamad, Zahid Al-Sheikh was alleged to have been one of the directors of LDI. The ARB was told that Zahid was one of the older brothers of Khalid Sheikh Mohammed, known to be a member of the senior leadership of Al Qaeda.

On April 25, 2011, the whistleblower organization WikiLeaks published a formerly secret assessment of Muhamed Hussein Abdallah, a detainee from Somalia. The assessment noted that in 1986 Abdallah worked as teacher at the Jalozai refugee camp, at a school sponsored by the LDI, at a time when Zahid Al-Sheikh was a director of the organization.

== Lajnat Al-Da'wa al Islamia leadership ==
According to a press release from the Saudi Ministry of Islamic Affairs, Endowments, Call and Guidance, Prince Dr. Bandar bin Salman bin Mohammed Al-Saud was identified as the Head of (Islamic) Call Committee in Africa.
