= Ammar al-Baluchi =

Prisoner at Guantanamo Bay detention camp

Ammar al-Baluchi عمار البلوچی
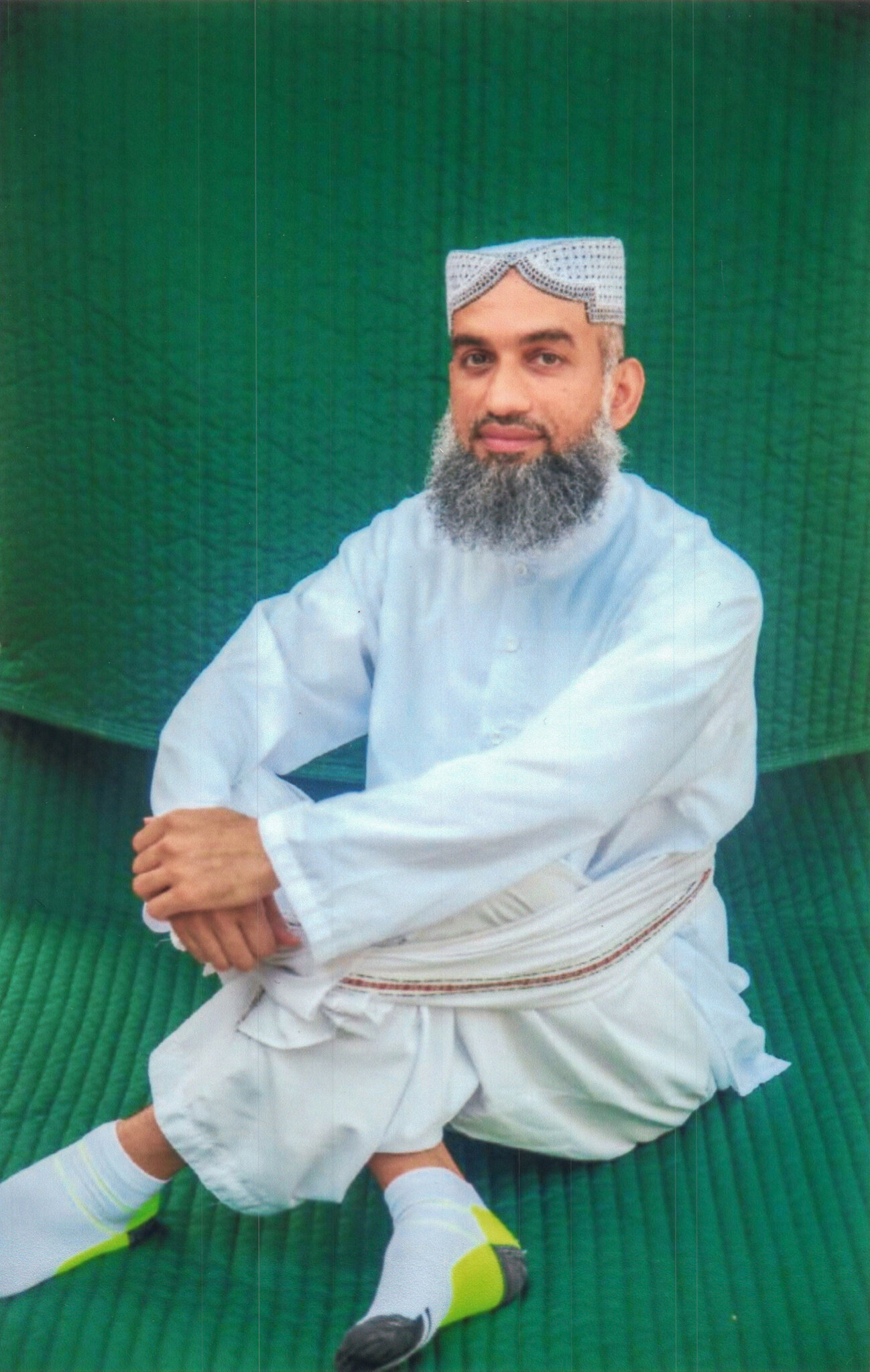
- al-Baluchi in 2022
- Born: Ali Abdul Aziz Ali; 29 August 1977 (age 49); Al Ahmadi, Kuwait
- Arrested: 29 April 2003; Karachi, Pakistan
- Citizenship: Pakistani, Kuwait (possibly)
- Detained at: Guantánamo Bay, Cuba
- ISN: 10018
- Occupation: Computer technician
- Spouse: Aafia Siddiqui (m. 2003; div. 2003)
- Relatives: Khalid Sheikh Mohammed (uncle); Zahid al-Sheikh (uncle); Ramzi Ahmed Yousef (cousin)

Ammar al-Baluchi (Note: Urdu: عمار البلوچی) (born Ali Abdul Aziz Ali; (Note: Urdu: علی عبدال عزیز علی) 29 August 1977) is a Kuwaiti-born Pakistani citizen who has been in American custody at the Guantanamo Bay detention camp since 2006. He was arrested in the Pakistani former capital city of Karachi in 2003 before being transferred; the series of criminal charges against him include: "facilitating the 9/11 attackers, acting as a courier for Osama bin Laden and plotting to crash a plane packed with explosives into the U.S. consulate in Karachi." He is a nephew of the Pakistani terrorist Khalid Sheikh Mohammed, who served as a senior official of al-Qaeda between the late 1980s and early 2000s; and a cousin of the Pakistani terrorist Ramzi Ahmed Yousef, who played a key role in the 1993 World Trade Center bombing, the Philippine Airlines Flight 434 bombing, and the high-profile Bojinka plot.

American authorities have stated that al-Baluchi was a "key lieutenant" of his uncle Khalid Sheikh Mohammed during al-Qaeda's preparation for the 9/11 attacks, and that he had told investigators that he had sought help in al-Qaeda's efforts to develop biological weapons to use against enemy forces and other targets. al-Baluchi's ex-wife Aafia Siddiqui, a Pakistani cognitive neuroscientist, was arrested by Afghan police in Ghazni Province in 2008 and subsequently transferred to American custody at FMC Carswell, where she remains incarcerated on terrorism charges. Siddiqui's family has denied that she was ever married to al-Baluchi, but the marriage has been attested by Pakistani and American intelligence personnel, Mohammed, and Siddiqui herself.

Baluchi's detainee assessment memorandum by the U.S. Department of Defense, 8 December 2006

After being arrested in Karachi, al-Baluchi was transferred to Afghanistan and detained at the Salt Pit, a now-defunct CIA black site near Bagram Airfield. It has been reported that he was tortured extensively, being used as a "training prop" to teach enhanced interrogation techniques to new agents; trainees took turns shoving his head into a wall in sessions that lasted for hours, inflicting considerable brain damage. He was also doused with icy water and kept in stress positions, though these techniques ultimately failed to contribute to the acquisition of any useful intelligence. In 2018, the United Nations released a public announcement stating that al-Baluchi's ongoing captivity "breaches human rights law" and called on American authorities to immediately end his arbitrary detention.

== Early life and education ==
Ammar al-Baluchi was born on 29 August 1977, in Al Ahmadi, Kuwait. He is the nephew on his mother's side of Khalid Sheikh Mohammed (the organizer of the September 11 attacks) and the cousin of Ramzi Yousef, the organizer of the 1993 World Trade Center bombing. His family was of ethnic Baluch origin, originally from Balochistan, Pakistan. As such, his name "al-Baluchi" also comes from his ethnic identity. The family patriarch and his brother were lay Deobandi preachers. They moved the family to Kuwait in the 1960s.

Baluchi grew up in Kuwait but spent most of his teenage years in Iranian Baluchistan. He is a citizen of Pakistan. Trained as a computer technician, he dressed in Western clothes and "introduced himself as a businessman", but had been "groomed ... since boyhood" by his cousins and uncles "to join their clandestine war," according to journalist Deborah Scroggins. According to a U.S. government biography, his "chief mentor" was his cousin and 1993 World Trade Center bombing orchestrator Ramzi Yousef, "who taught him in the early 1990s in Iran about the importance of war against the West."

He is fluent in English and worked at Mohammed's honey-processing company in Karachi for a while before being hired in 1998 as a computer technician for Modern Electronics Corporation in Dubai. According to some evidence given at the Combatant Status Review Tribunal, he was "very open-minded and western-oriented", while his ex-wife told investigators he was "a very strict Muslim" who opposed his wife's leaving the home.

== Career ==
=== Preparation for the 9/11 attacks ===
According to a U.S. government biography, al-Baluchi "volunteered his services" to his uncle, Khalid Sheikh Mohammed, in 1997.

According to U.S. officials, the majority of money that came to the Saudi hijackers for the September 11 attacks was transferred through al-Baluchi and Mustafa al-Hawsawi. The 9/11 Commission reported that he "helped them with plane tickets, traveler's checks, and hotel reservations", and "taught them about everyday aspects of life in the West, such as purchasing clothes and ordering food". In his defence, al-Baluchi claims that he often helped people in Dubai with such things to supplement his income, and he had no way of knowing whether any of them were criminals.

On 10 October 1998, al-Baluchi used his passport to open a bank account with the Emirates Bank International, using the name "Ali" based on his nasab Ibn Abdulaziz Ali and listing his employer's address with PO box 16958, Jebel Ali, Dubai.

He was then introduced to Marwan al-Shehhi by his uncle, and Shehhi allegedly asked him to help transfer money from Shehhi's company in Dubai to his company in the United States, ostensibly to help avoid banking fees if he transferred the money himself.

In January 2000, an order using Shehhi's credit card had a Boeing 747-400 flight simulator program, a Boeing 767 flight deck video, and some flight attendant literature and flight manuals shipped to al-Baluchi's work address. al-Baluchi then shipped them to his uncle to pass onto Shehhi.

On 18 April, al-Baluchi sent a wire transfer of $5,000 to Adel Rafeea, the administrator of the Islamic Center of San Diego, from the Wall Street Exchange Centre in Dubai, using his PO Box, passport and listing his phone number as 0506745651. Rafeaa later claimed that Nawaf al-Hazmi had asked him to accept the money on his behalf.

Tracing the calls made to al-Baluchi's phone number, authorities discovered that he had received 16 calls from 28 to 30 June from a pre-paid Voicestream mobile purchased in Manhattan on 4 June. The phone was deactivated on 11 July, and authorities allege it belonged to Atta, while al-Baluchi insisted that he only ever spoke with Shehhi, who had hired him. Around this time, al-Baluchi complained to Mohammed that he couldn't do all this additional work himself, and his uncle told him that Mustafa al-Hawsawi would co-ordinate with him to act as an assistant.

On 29 June, a man named "Isam Mansur" wired $5,000 to the Western Union at 1440 Broadway in New York, where Shehhi picked it up. This is alleged to have been al-Baluchi, since two later direct payments into Shehhi's Sun Trust account from the Exchange Center, a $10,000 payment to Shehhi on 18 July from "Isam Mansur" and a $9,500 5 August payment from "Isam Mansour", gave al-Baluchi's PO Box number.

On 8 August, al-Baluchi opened a bank account at Dubai Islamic Bank, using his name, passport and phone number. A $20,000 payment from al-Baluchi's bank account to Shehhi's Sun Trust account on 29 August gave a phone number one digit different from the one given by Isam Mansour on 5 August.

A $70,000 payment was made to Shehhi's account by "Hani (Fawaz Trading)" on 17 September from the same exchange centre. Hani gave a telephone number one digit removed from the one al-Baluchi used on the transfer from his bank account on 29 August.

In September, Hani Hanjour went to Dubai, where al-Baluchi gave him $3,000 to open a new bank account, and later deposited $5,000 in the account which Hanjour later accessed from ATMs in the United States. When Ahmed al-Ghamdi went to Dubai, al-Baluchi helped him purchase a cell phone. It is believed nine of the hijackers met with him in Dubai and received various levels of aid.

The 9/11 Commission Report stated that he "relied on the unremarkable nature of his transactions, which were essentially invisible amid the billions of dollars flowing daily across the globe."

On 27 August 2001, al-Baluchi applied for a visa to travel to the United States for a week after his employer announced the closing of their Dubai branch, and the government had sent notices informing the employees their work permits had been rescinded and they had to leave the country. He was declined since he appeared to be an economic immigrant, and instead moved back home to Pakistan a few days before the attacks.

=== Post-9/11 period ===
Moving back in with his parents in Karachi, Pakistan, al-Baluchi saw his uncle several times when he came to visit. According to a short biography written by the United States government's Central Intelligence Agency (CIA), after the Taliban was initially driven from power after the 9/11 attack, al-Baluchi assisted KSM in organizing the movement of al-Qaeda operatives and their families to safehouses in Pakistan.

- According to US government information, KSM had Baluchi be the "communications intermediary" between al-Qaeda and "shoe bombers" Richard Reid and Saajid Badat. In early 2002 Baluchi helped his uncle "prepare operatives" for travel from Pakistan to the United States, "ostensibly to carry out attacks".
- Another plan was to hijack airliners and crash them into London's Heathrow airport, but this plan was set aside in order to focus on a plan to bomb the US Consulate and other Western targets in Karachi.
- He also worked with his uncle to prepare Majid Khan and others for travel to the United States to conduct terrorist operations.
- Baluchi reportedly sent Majid Khan to Thailand in late 2002 to deliver $50,000 to finance a plan by Jemaah Islamiya leader Hambali (Riduan Isamuddin) to attack US and Israeli targets in Southeast Asia.

He later told investigators he helped his uncle arrange travel visas for people, but didn't know whether any of them were militants or not. In August 2002, the FBI questioned Abdul Samad Din Mohammed, the brother-in-law of Khalid Sheikh Mohammed. He reported that al-Baluchi was often in the company of his uncle, and would pick people up from the airport. His uncle KSM was arrested in Rawalpindi on 1 March 2003. al-Baluchi spent the next two months with Walid bin 'Attash. According to US reports, following his uncle's arrest al-Baluchi took charge of some of the new attacks being planned.

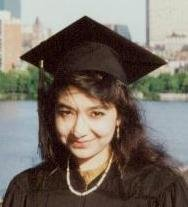
Pakistani cognitive neuroscientist Aafia Siddiqui, who was married to al-Baluchi from February 2003 to April/May 2003. She is currently incarcerated at FMC Carswell in the United States.

==== Marriage to Aafia Siddiqui ====
al-Baluchi also married Aafia Siddiqui. She was accused of being an al-Qaeda member and in February 2010 was convicted of assaulting with a deadly weapon and attempting to kill U.S. soldiers and FBI agents who were seeking to interrogate her while she was in custody, claimed to be married to al-Baluchi. The marriage was confirmed by Pakistani and US intelligence, a defense psychologist, and Khalid Sheikh Mohammed's family, while Siddiqui's own family denies she was married to al-Baluchi.

According to the FBI, after her arrest, Aafia Siddiqui told them that after she learned she was wanted by the US government she had gone into hiding around late March 2003 with the al-Baluchi clan. Divorced at the time, she stated she married al-Baluchi out of religious piety, since she "could not live in the same house with an unmarried male" (namely al-Baluchi). Their marriage was held in Hub Chowki outside of Karachi in the inner courtyard of al-Baluchi's house, with female al-Baluchi family members present. Siddiqui describes al-Baluchi as very kind to her, "a good man who is wrongly accused"; however, Siddiqui later repudiated all statements given by her to the FBI.

The marriage lasted only a couple of months. According to one of KSM's uncles, Mohammed Hussein, al-Baluchi felt alienated by Aafia's "liberal way of life". Aafia told the FBI that al-Baluchi divorced her after he was arrested.

== Arrest by U.S. authorities in Pakistan ==
Siddiqui was arrested 29 April 2003 in Karachi along with al-Attash. al-Baluchi had a copy of a letter to Osama bin Laden from Saudi scholars in his pocket, a computer disk containing a draft of a letter to bin Laden, two images of the September 11 attacks, and a perfume bottle containing low-concentration cyanide used to bleach and perfume clothes. al-Baluchi was also accused of discussing the possibility of exporting explosives to the United States through textile companies, but claims to have no knowledge of what conversation is being referenced. The arrests led to the arrests of Jawad al-Bashar and Farzand Shah. On 7 November 2003, a detainee was interrogated and said that Mohamed Atta and Ramzi bin al-Shibh spoke briefly in August 2000 about a "Losh" who had asked Atta if he could travel to the United States to help with any potential plots, having already asked Mohammed three months earlier. Authorities allege this is a reference to al-Baluchi.

=== Custody at CIA black sites in Afghanistan ===
Baluchi was extensively tortured by the CIA after his arrest, while being held at a CIA black site north of Kabul, Afghanistan. The extent of his torture was detailed in a 2008 report by the CIA's inspector general, declassified in March 2022. According to the inspector general, al-Baluchi was held there "extra-legally" as he was a Pakistani citizen who no longer presented a terrorist threat, and it was not clear to him whether al-Baluchi's torture was even intended to elicit information; the inspector general concluded that al-Baluchi's torture ultimately yielded no useful intelligence.

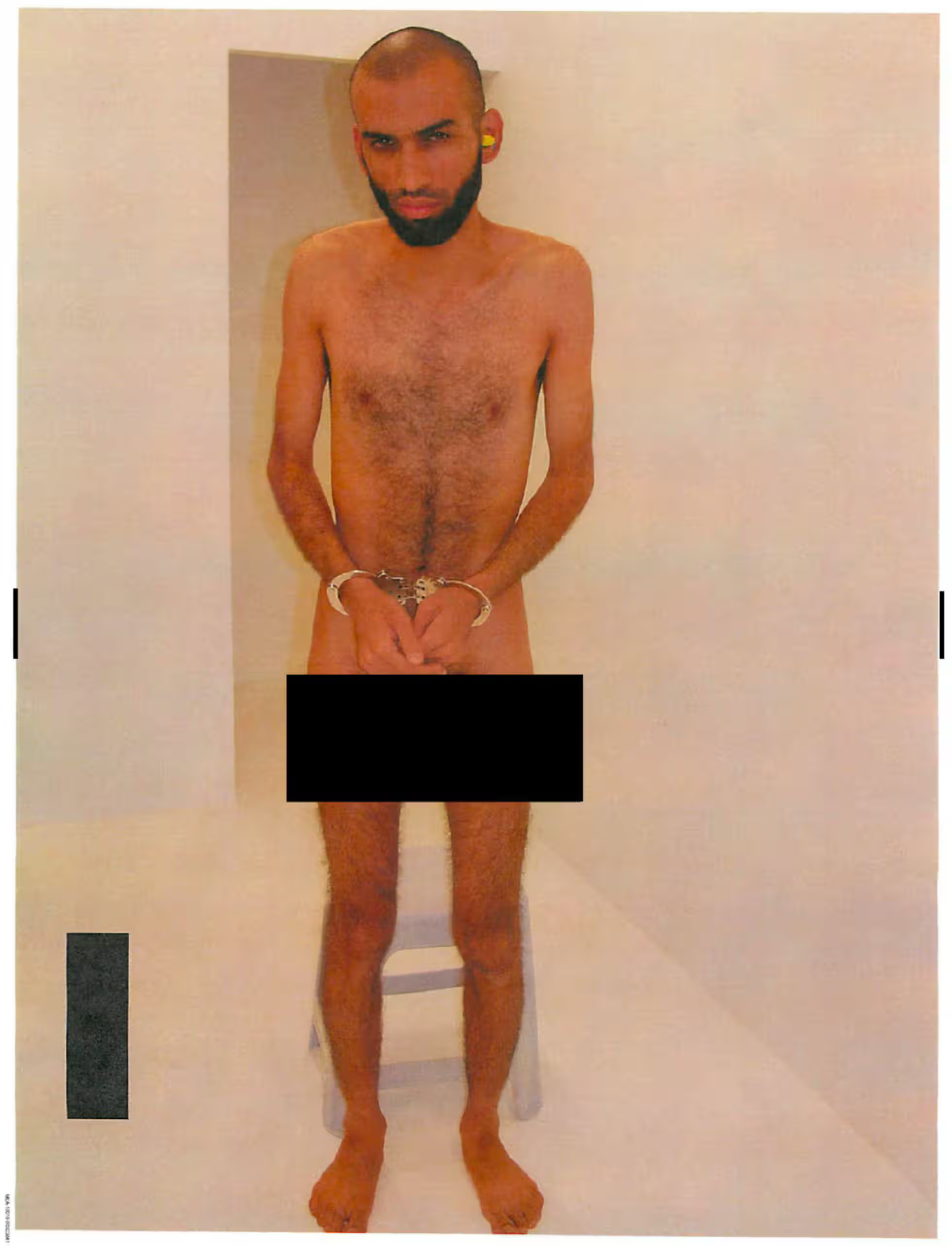
al-Baluchi being forced to be nude at a CIA black site in Romania, 2004

While in CIA custody, al-Baluchi served as a "training prop" to teach torture techniques to trainee CIA interrogators. One torture technique, known as "walling", was often practiced on al-Baluchi. In it, trainees would line up and take turns "shoving" a naked and tied-up al-Baluchi head-first into a plywood wall behind him, with sessions typically lasting for a few hours each. One of the instructors identified the goal being to "bounce" al-Baluchi's head off the wall. Analysis carried out by a neuropsychologist in 2018 found "abnormalities indicating moderate to severe brain damage" consistent with traumatic brain injury in al-Baluchi's brain. In addition, the inspector general said that interrogators in the black site also carried out torture that went beyond the CIA's guidelines, including dousing him with ice water and forcing him to kneel backwards with a stick behind his knees in a stress position. In a senate report from 2014, officials noted: "al-Baluchi was tortured and forcibly dunked into a tub filled with ice water. CIA interrogators forcibly kept his head under water while he struggled to breathe and beat him repeatedly with a truncheon-like object hitting him and smashing his head against a wall."

==== Discovery of other plots to attack civilian targets ====
According to US investigators, al-Baluchi told them that al-Qaeda had set up a biological weapons lab and he asked Aafia Siddiqui (who has a biology degree from MIT) advice on how long it would take to develop such weapons and whether the man in charge was capable of developing the weapons. Siddiqui replied that she "was willing to participate in a biological weapons (BW) project if al-Qaida tasked her to do so".

Another plot involving al-Baluchi alleged by US investigators involved Heathrow airport.

According to al-Baluchi's file, he told interrogators that he became aware of a plan to attack Heathrow airport in January 2003 and had intended to seek help from a more senior al-Qaida operative, Walid bin Attash, to carry it out. An "analyst note" in the files notes that the plot called for "crashing numerous airplanes into Heathrow, with a secondary explosion immediately outside of the airport as a diversion". It collapsed after KSM was arrested in March 2003.

== Transfer to the U.S. Guantánamo Bay prison in Cuba ==
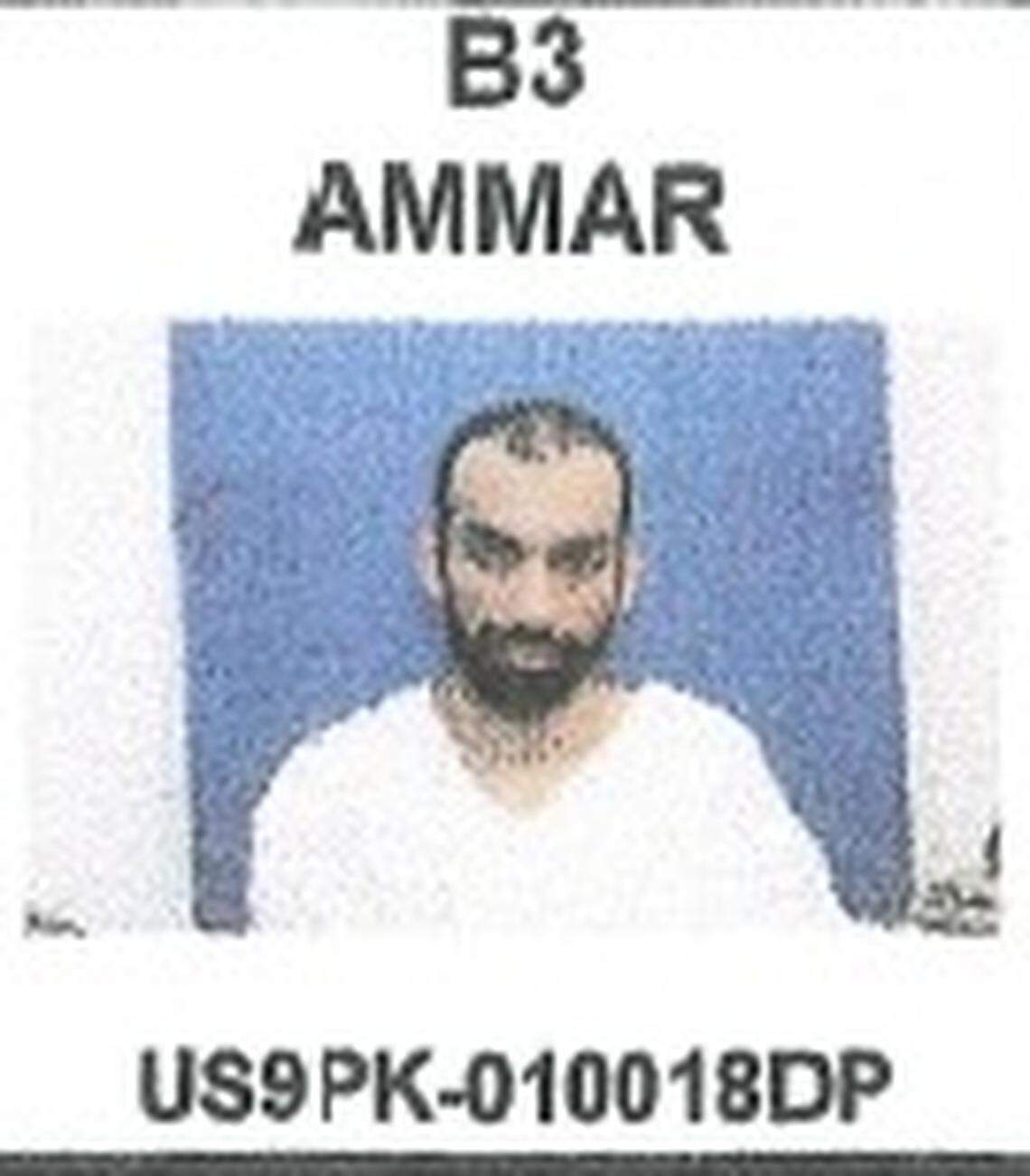
Mug shot of Ammar al-Baluchi taken shortly after he was transferred to the Guantanamo Bay detention camp in September 2006. The photo was obtained by reporters of McClatchyDC.

In December 2005, Human Rights Watch listed al-Baluchi as a "ghost detainee" held in the CIA prison system. al-Baluchi was kept in CIA custody until 6 September 2006, when he was transferred to Guantanamo Bay Prison in Cuba. On 6 September 2006, al-Baluchi was transferred from a black site location to Guantanamo Bay detention camp. He was given the Internment Serial Number 10018 and is currently detained at a top-secret site at the Guantanamo base that allegedly houses approximately 15 "high-value" prisoners. Its location and the conditions inside are withheld from public knowledge and there are suspected grave human rights concerns regarding its conditions. Al-Baluchi's attorney James G. Connell III visited him there in August 2013 under an order issued by the military commission.

As of 2023, al-Baluchi was stuck in a state of legal limbo, yet to face trial. No journalist has been able to talk to him since his detention, due to strict restrictions imposed by the US government. Declassified CIA documents revealed that the CIA had been using al-Baluchi as a human experiment for interrogators learning torture techniques. He was subjected to water dousing, cramped confinement, sleep deprivation, put in stress positions and walling. Medical professionals examining al-Baluchi reported serious consequences like brain damage, traumatic brain injury and post-traumatic stress disorder as a result of torture.

=== Combatant Status Review Tribunal (2007) ===
US District Court Justice Joyce Hens Green ruled that the Combatant Status Review Tribunals were unconstitutional. Nevertheless, the Department of Defense scheduled Tribunals for the 14 high-value captives who were transferred from covert CIA custody, on 6 September 2006, for early winter of 2007.

The Summary of Evidence memo for al-Baluchi's Combatant Status Review Tribunal was drafted on 8 February 2007.

Al-Baluchi cooperated with his tribunal. Although he was not able to call Khalid Sheikh Mohammed, Saifullah Paracha or Ramzi bin al-Shibh to testify about his lack of connection to al-Qaeda, he was permitted to have his legal representative field statements they had made. He chose to put forward the statements by Mohammed and bin al-Shibh as evidence, but not the statement by Paracha.

Baluchi requested statements be garnered from Modern Electronics Corporation personnel, including Samir Sharin, Mohammed Mayer, Asraf Mayer, Ammar al-Tesqui and Sayed Tesqui that would testify he had no connections to militant forces, and that his employee records would show that he left several days before the attacks because his work permit had expired when MEC closed its Dubai branch. The tribunal judge ruled that although al-Baluchi's leaving Dubai a few days prior to the attacks was among the reasons for his capture, it was not relevant to seek records from his employer. Since the tribunal did not locate the individuals, al-Baluchi submitted two statements he had written himself as what he believed his coworkers would say, and what he believed his Israeli roommates would say.

In his defence, al-Baluchi argued that he often acted as a "businessman" to supplement his income, and thus his signature, telephone number and similar details were easily obtained in Dubai. He admitted dealing with Marwan al-Shehhi, but said that "when [he] approached me, he never declared himself as 'hijacker Marwan al Shehhi'. He approached me the same way he approached other individuals and companies in the U.S.: a man wanting to do business".

The Department of Defense announced on August 9, 2007 that all fourteen of the "high-value detainees" who had been transferred to Guantanamo from the CIA's black sites, had been officially classified as "enemy combatants". Although judges Peter Brownback and Keith J. Allred had ruled two months earlier that only "illegal enemy combatants" could face military commissions, the Department of Defense waived the qualifier and said that all fourteen men could now face charges before Guantanamo military commissions.

=== First military commission (2008) ===
In February 2008, al-Baluchi was committed to a joint trial, charged with conspiracy, attacking civilians and civilian objects, causing serious bodily injury, murder, destruction of property, hijacking, terrorism and providing material support for terrorism.

al-Baluchi, Walid Bin Attash, and Khalid Sheikh Mohammed chose to serve as their own attorney. They requested laptops, and internet access, in order to prepare their defences. In October 2008, Ralph Kohlmann ruled that the men be provided with the computers, but not the internet access. al-Baluchi's request said he was a Microsoft Certified software engineer.

On 8 December 2008, Khalid Sheikh Mohammed told the judge that he and the other four indictees wished to plead guilty; however, the plea would be delayed until after mental competency hearings for Hawsawi and bin al-Shibh. Mohammed said, "We want everyone to plead together."

=== Executive Order 13492 of Barack Obama (2009) ===
On 22 January 2009, United States President Barack Obama issued Executive Order 13492, ordering a halt to the Guantanamo military commission as part of the overall closure of Guantanamo Bay Detention Camp. On 21 April 2009, United States Senate minority leader Mitch McConnell cited "Ali Abd al-Azeez Ali" as an example of the kind of captive United States President Barack Obama might free in the United States when he closes the camp in January 2010, because he didn't know what else to do with him.

=== Second military commission (2011) ===
In October 2011, in an operation called the "baseline review," the prison seized all legal materials belonging to "high-value detainees," starting with Abd al-Rahim al-Nashiri. The prison also announced that it would change its previous policy and begin reviewing legal mail for its content. In response, the Chief Defense Counsel (United States) ordered the attorneys under his supervision to stop sending privileged communications to Guantanamo prisoners. Under the Chief Defense Counsel (United States) policy, Al-Baluchi could not receive mail from his attorneys until November 2013.

On 4 April 2012, the Department of Defense referred Guantanamo military commission charges against al-Baluchi and four other men for participation in the conspiracy leading up to the September 11 attacks. On 5 May 2012, Military Judge James Pohl arraigned al al-Baluchi, and appointed attorneys to represent him.

=== Preliminary hearing on admissibility of clean team evidence (2019) ===
During a preliminary hearing, held on 17 September 2019, the prosecution released a transcript from a conversation al-Baluchi had with another captive, when they were in two nearby recreation yards. It had not been known, until the release of this transcript, that the recreation yards contained hidden listening devices. According to an article by Carol Rosenberg, published in The New York Times, Camp Seven had at least two recreation yards. Captives got a whole recreation yard to themselves, during their outdoor recreation time. But they could hear other captives in nearby yards, and could communicate with them, by yelling.

Prosecutors claimed the transcript's discussion of a confession al-Baluchi was considering, drafted for him by fellow captive Ramzi bin al-Shibh, was evidence of al-Baluchi's guilt. His defense attorneys argued that his willingness to consider a confession was an after effect of his years of torture.

The purpose of the hearing was to help a new judge, W. Shane Cohen, make a decision as to whether confessions given to the "clean team" were still compromised by al-Baluchi's torture.

On 11 April 2025, the military commission suppressed al-Baluchi's statements to the Federal Bureau of Investigation on the basis that they were involuntary and obtained by torture.

== History of Judges ==
On July 23, 2025, Lt. Col Schrama is the fifth judge to enter the case after the departure of Judge McCall and is the current presiding judge. Schrama has not set the current trial date, although the prosecutors want jury selection to start by January 2027. Schrama has been ruling motions over the summer of 2026. He is a part of GTMO’s line of judges on the case who include Col. James L. Pohl, Col. W. Shane Cohen, Marine Col. Stephen F. Keane, Air Force Col. Matthew N. McCall, and now currently (2026) Air Force Lt. Col. Michael Schrama.

== In popular culture ==
=== Zero Dark Thirty (2012) ===
A fictionalized account of al-Baluchi's interrogation at black sites is depicted in the 2012 film Zero Dark Thirty. The character Ammar is portrayed by Reda Kateb. Al-Baluchi has complained that the United States has provided more information to the filmmakers Kathryn Bigelow and Mark Boal about al-Baluchi's treatment in CIA custody than it has to al-Baluchi's own attorneys.

==== CIA acknowledgement ====
The CIA acknowledged that the character Ammar is based on al-Baluchi. In the film, CIA interrogator Dan Fuller and other characters repeatedly describe Ammar as Khalid Sheikh Mohammed's nephew. Fuller also references the arrest of Ammar and describes his role as the financial facilitator in the 9/11 attacks. "The first 25 minutes of the movie are largely taken up with torture: Ammar is strung up, beaten, water boarded and kept awake for 96 hours straight."

In addition Al Baluchi's defense team claimed producers could not develop and depict information so explicit without relying on classified materials. They discovered that the CIA had a year long cooperation with the film makers, and during that time the agency shared details of Al Baluchi's torture during his time in the black site. The same information that was used in the film was being withheld from the team as it was deemed "too secret to be divulged."
