= James L. Pohl =

American lawyer

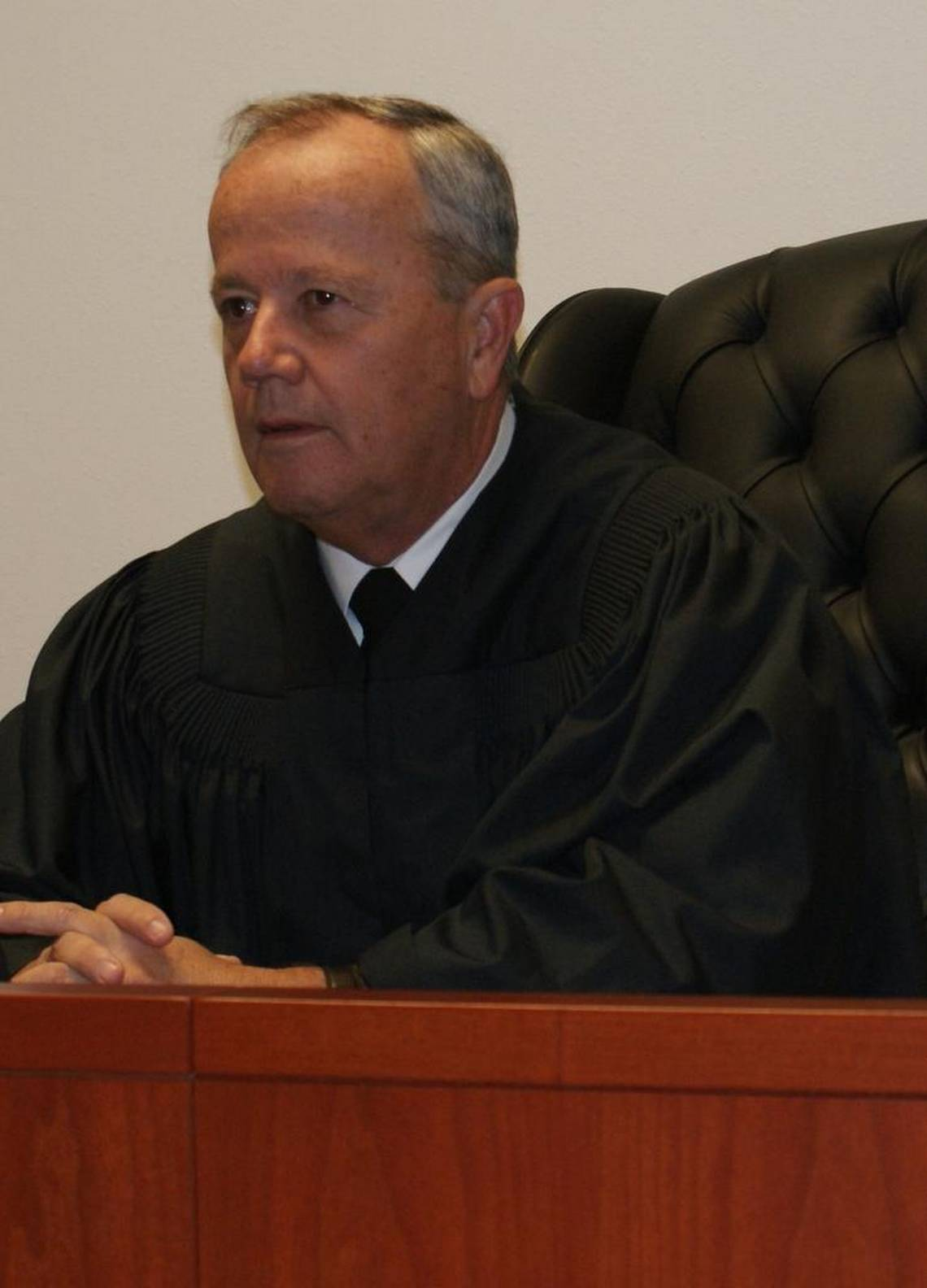
James Pohl, in court, in Guantanamo

Colonel James L. Pohl is an American lawyer and officer in the United States Army.

He is notable for having been appointed as a judge on a Guantanamo military commission. He is presiding over the commission of Khalid Sheikh Mohammad, Walid bin Attash, Ramzi bin al-Shibh, Ammar al-Baluchi, and Mustafa al-Hawsawi. From November 2011 to July 2014, Pohl also presided over the military commission of Abd el-Rahim al-Nashiri.

He is notable for serving as the judge of several of the GIs in the Abu Ghraib torture and prisoner abuse cases, and barring the demolition of Abu Ghraib prison because he had ruled it a crime scene.

In December 2008, Pohl was appointed to replace Ralph Kohlmann as the chief presiding officer for the military commissions.

Pohl received his J.D. from Pepperdine University in 1978.

== Suspension of Guantanamo Hearings ==
On January 29, 2009, Pohl denied the request of the Obama administration to delay proceeding for 120 days in the case of Abd al-Rahim al-Nashiri. Pohl argued that tribunal rules give the judges sole authority to delay cases and that postponing proceedings against Abd al-Rahim al-Nashiri was not reasonable and "does not serve the interest of justice". According to Carol Rosenberg, writing in the Miami Herald, Pohl's ruling stated:

- "The Commission is bound by the law as it currently exists not as it may change in the future."
- "The public interest in a speedy trial will be harmed by the delay in the arraignment."

According to Guantanamo spokesman Commander Jeffrey Gordon: "The Department of Defense is currently reviewing Judge Pohl's ruling. We will be in compliance with the president's orders regarding Guantánamo." According to Fox News, Pentagon spokesman Geoff Morrell said that Pohl would be directed to comply with Obama's executive order.

On February 5, 2009, the charges were dismissed without prejudice by the convening authority.

== Assigned to investigate the Fort Hood shootings ==
Pohl was assigned to serve as the investigating officer for the article 32 hearing for Nidal Hasan, the perpetrator of the 2009 Fort Hood shooting.

== Assigned to Brigadier General Sinclair Court-Martial ==
Pohl was assigned to preside over the court martial of Brigadier General Jeffrey A. Sinclair, a former deputy commander of the 82nd Airborne Division, charged with sodomy. Following acceptance of Sinclair's guilty pleas on some (but not all) of the charges he faced (including adultery with three different women, violating a general order by possessing pornography in the Afghan theater of operations, and conduct unbecoming an officer), Pohl sentenced Sinclair to a reprimand and forfeiture of five thousand dollars a month for four months ($20,000 total).
