= Walling =

Method of torture

Walling is a method of torture used by the CIA in which a person's neck is encircled by a collar, and is then used to slam the person against a wall. According to information gathered by the International Committee of the Red Cross from six detainees, "walling" meant "beating by use of a collar", in at least one instance against a concrete wall.

Prompted to explain their interrogation techniques to the United States Department of Justice in 2005, the CIA provided a series of memos to the department's Office of Legal Counsel, one of which described "walling". The memo states that walling "involves the use of a flexible, false wall ... the interrogator pulls the individual forward and then quickly and firmly pushes the individual into the wall. It is the individual's shoulder blades that hit the wall. During this motion, the head and neck are supported with a rolled hood or towel".

Steven G. Bradbury, a Principal Deputy Assistant Attorney General during the Bush administration, said that walling "involves what may be characterized as rough handling".

According to a report by the CIA Inspector General, Ammar al-Baluchi suffered brain damage after being used as a "training prop" for interrogators.
