= Ali Khan (activist) =

ALi Khan AK (fl. 2003–2006) is a citizen of Pakistan, and a permanent resident of the United States. One of his sons, Majid Khan, was held in extrajudicial detention, in secret interrogation centers, run by the CIA, for four years. On September 6, 2006, his son Majid was transferred to military custody in the Guantanamo Bay detention camps, in Cuba.

Ali Khan AK released an affidavit alleging torture inflicted on his son by US counterterrorism interrogators, and on other individuals.

== Life in Maryland ==
Khan brought his family to Maryland, where some of his children, including Majid, attended American schools.

Some of his children, including Majid, returned to Pakistan, when they became adults.

== Majid and Mohammed's capture ==
His sons, Majid and Mohammed, and Mohammed's wife and infant child, were captured in Pakistan on March 5, 2003. Mohammed, his wife, his child, were released after a month. Majid had been threatened with transfer to Guantanamo Bay detention camp. When Mohammed was released the Khans lost all contact with Majid, and didn't know where he was, or if he was still alive, until President Bush announced that Majid had been transferred to Guantanamo together with 13 men suspected of being the most senior members of al Qaeda to be in US custody.

== Ali Khan's affidavit ==
Ali Khan's affidavit contains new allegations. According to Ali Khan:

- His son Mohammed reported that Khalid Sheikh Mohammed's had been subjected to abusive interrogations:
  "Also according to Mohammed, he and Majid were detained in the same place where two of Khalid Sheik Mohammed’s young children, ages about 6 and 8, were held. The Pakistani guards told my son that the boys were kept in a separate area upstairs, and were denied food and water by other guards. They were also mentally tortured by having ants or other creatures put on their legs to scare them and get them to say where their father was hiding."
- His son Mohammed had been allowed to talk to Majid, during his detention, and reported that Majid reported being subjected to abusive interrogation by Americans.
- Ali Khan asked the Tribunal why his son Majid was facing allegations that his family members had asserted that he had become a religious fanatic. He disputed that his son was a religious fanatic, and that member of his family had ever asserted that he was a religious fanatic.
- Ali Khan said that Mohammed reported that Majid had been subjected to twenty days of beatings, binding in stress positions during day-long interrogations, sleep deprivation, and confinement to a space too small to lie down or sit up, when he wasn't being interrogated.
