= Zahid Al-Sheikh =

Soldier and brother of 9/11 mastermind

- ظاہد الشیخ
- Born: Kuwait
- Occupation: Charity worker
- Known for: Older brother of Khalid Sheikh Mohammed

Zahid Al-Sheikh (Urdu: ظاہد الشیخ) is an elder brother of 9/11 mastermind Khalid Sheikh Mohammad. He volunteered to travel to Afghanistan to fight the Soviet occupation of Afghanistan. Following the ouster of the Soviet forces, Zahid is reported to have played a role in planning terrorist projects. He is also reported to have shifted careers to the direction of non-governmental organizations that provided aid to refugees.

Zahid and two of his brothers traveled to Afghanistan in the mid-1980s. His two brothers are believed to have been killed in combat. His youngest brother, Khalid Shaikh Mohammed, who was later to play a senior role in al Qaeda's leadership arrived in 1987. Zahid is reported to have introduced his younger brother to leading anti-Soviet fighters.

According to the 9/11 Commission,

Visiting Pakistan for the first time in early 1987, he traveled to Peshawar, where his brother Zahid introduced him to the famous Afghan mujahid Abdul Rasul Sayyaf, head of the Hizbul-Ittihad El-Islami (Islamic Union Party).

The USA sought Zahid for questioning about whether he played a role in the 1993 World Trade Center bombing.

Zahid is reported to have collaborated with Khalid Sheikh Mohammed in planning Operation Bojinka, a 1995 plan to hijack 12 airplanes over the Pacific.

On September 26, 2001, shortly after al Qaeda's 2001 attacks on the World Trade Center, The Guardian published a report on their investigation as to whether there was evidence of a real link between Osama bin Laden and Mercy International, the charity Zahid helped run. They reported they could find no evidence of a link, but called for a more detailed investigation—to reassure the public.

American intelligence analysts alleged, during Adel Hassan Hamad's Combatant Status Review Tribunal and Administrative Review Board hearing, that Zahid was tied to terrorism and that Hamad's acquaintanceship with him was one of the factors in favor of his continued detention. American intelligence analysts alleged that Zahid was the director of the Jelazee Refugee Camp and Lajnat Al-Da'wa al Islamia (LDI) in Pakistan. Hamad confirmed that Zahid had been a director of LDI and not a director of Jelazee Refugee Camp supported by LDI. American intelligence analysts told Hamad's hearing that "other sources" identified Zahid as holding extremist views. Hamad replied that his relationship with Zahid was a purely administrative one, but he did not believe Zahid was an extremist.
