= List of Sudanese detainees at Guantanamo Bay =

The United States Department of Defense acknowledges holding twelve Sudanese captives in Guantanamo. A total of 779 captives have been held in extrajudicial detention in the Guantanamo Bay detention camps, in Cuba since the camps opened on January 11, 2002, The camp population peaked in 2004 at approximately 660. Only nineteen new captives, all "high value detainees" have been transferred there since the United States Supreme Court's ruling in Rasul v. Bush. As of December 2013 the camp population stands at approximately 160.

== List of Sudanese citizen at Guantanamo ==
| isn | name | arrival date | transfer date | notes |
|---|---|---|---|---|
| 36 | Ibrahim Othman Ibrahim Idris | 2002-01-11 | 2013-12-18 | Released with Noor Uthman Muhammed. |
| 54 | Ibrahim Ahmed Mahmoud Al Qosi | 2002-06-12 | 2012-07-10 | Faced charges before the first set of Presidentially authorized Guantanamo military commissions.; Agreed to plead guilty in 2010. |
| 81 | Walid Mohammad Haj Mohammad Ali | 2002-01-21 | 2008-04-30 | |
| 345 | Sami al-Hajj | 2002-06-14 | 2008-04-30 | Cameraman for Al Jazeera when he was arrested on the border between Pakistan and Afghanistan. |
| 700 | Muhammed Al Ghazali Babaker Mahjoub | 2002-08-05 | 2004-03-31 | |
| 707 | Noor Uthman Muhammaed | 2002-08-05 | 2013-12-18 | In February 2011 agreed to a negotiated plea agreement that guaranteed him a fixed release date in return for a guilty plea. |
| 710 | Salim Mahmoud Adem Mohammed Bani Amir | 2002-08-05 | 2007-12-12 | |
| 712 | Hammad Ali Amno Gadallah | 2002-08-05 | 2005-07-19 | Determined not to have been an enemy combatant during his Combatant Status Review Tribunal. |
| 714 | Al Rachid Hasan Ahmad Abdul Raheem | 2002-08-05 | 2004-03-31 | |
| 719 | Mustafa Ibrahim Mustafa Al Hassan | 2002-08-05 | 2006-10-06 | Allegedly associated with the Dawa wa Irshad [sic] a non-governmental organization American counter-terrorism analysts suspect has ties to terrorism.; Repatriated on 2008 October 8.; Reported Koran desecration. |
| 720 | Amir Yakoub Mohammed Al Amir Mahmoud | 2002-08-05 | 2008-04-30 | |
| 940 | Adel Hassan | 2003-03-23 | 2007-12-12 | |
