= W. Shane Cohen =

American lawyer and U.S Air force officer

Shane Cohen
- Other names: W. Shane Cohen
- Education: Brigham Young University (BA, JD); George Washington University (LLM)
- Occupation(s): Lawyer, Military officer
- Known for: his resignation delayed the prosecution of those charged with masterminding 9-11

Colonel Shane Cohen is an American lawyer, and officer in the United States Air Force. He was appointed the third Presiding Officer—essentially the judge—of the highest profile Military Commission, the one where Khalid Sheikh Mohammed, and four other suspects, faced charges for Al Qaeda's attacks on September 11, 2001.

Cohen told the public they could anticipate the trial to begin by January 11, 2021—the twentieth anniversary of the opening of the Guantanamo detention camps. However, on March 23, 2020 he announced his retirement from the Air Force after releasing a learned counsel from the case due to health issues, a decision which could further delay the trial. His official retirement date was July 1, 2020, but due to his entitlement to use up his accumulated unused leave (known as terminal leave when ending military service), his last working day was April 24, 2020. Cohen attributes his success to the age old adages; "You can observe a lot by just watching" and "The future ain’t what it used to be," and prefers his puns intended.
