= Ralph Kohlmann =

American Lawyer and Army officer

Ralph H. Kohlmann
- Born: Paterson, New Jersey
- Military career
- Branch: United States Marine Corps
- Service years: 1980–2009
- Rank: Colonel

Ralph Harold Kohlmann is an American lawyer and retired United States Marine Corps officer.

== Education ==
Raised in Wyckoff, New Jersey, Kohlmann is a 1976 graduate of Ramapo High School.

Education
date	institution
1980	Bachelor of Science, United States Naval Academy
1987	Juris Doctor, The Delaware Law School, Widener University
1994	Master of Law (Military Law), The Judge Advocate General's School, U.S. Army
2002	Master of Arts (National Security and Strategic Studies), United States Naval War College

== Military career ==
For his first seven years as an officer, Kohlmann served as a combat engineer. He switched to the Judge Advocate General Corps in 1987.

=== Service in Guantanamo for the Office of Military Commissions ===
On December 18, 2005, Kohlmann was announced as a Presiding Officer for the Guantanamo Military Commissions.

On Friday January 6, 2006 the Department of Defense officially appointed Kohlmann to preside over Binyam Mohammed's military commission. In its ruling in Hamdan v. Rumsfeld the United States Supreme Court ruled that President George W. Bush lacked the constitutional authority to create military commissions.

The Supreme Court had ruled that the United States Congress did have the constitutional authority to create military commissions, and Congress subsequently passed the Military Commissions Act of 2006 a few months later, re-instituting military commissions very similar to the earlier presidentially authorized commissions.

On December 13, 2007, The New York Times reported that Kohlmann was appointed to serve as a Chief judge by the Office of Military Commissions.

== Ordered Peter Brownback's replacement ==
On May 29, 2008, an e-mail from Kohlmann announced that a new officer was appointed to replace Peter Brownback. The initial lack of explanation triggered commentators to question Brownback's firing. Captain Andre Kok, a spokesperson for the Office of Military Commissions, claimed there had been "a mutual decision between Col. Brownback and the Army that he revert to his retired status when his current active-duty orders expire in June."

Commenting on this issue, the American Civil Liberties Union pointed to Brownback's decision to wait until the Prosecution complied with his order to make public Khadr's detention records—which may have substantiated his claims his incriminating statements were the product of abuse. They wrote the Pentagon "is unwilling to let judges exercise independence if it means a ruling against the government."

In writing about Kohlmann's reassignment of the Khadr case, The Washington Post asked readers to:

Imagine if, during the O.J. Simpson murder trial, Judge Lance Ito ordered the district attorney's office to hand over DNA samples and logs of O.J.'s stay in county jail after his arrest. Then imagine that the prosecutors refused to do so. And that, instead of being fined for contempt of court (or thrown in jail themselves), these same prosecutors somehow got their boss to get Ito tossed off the bench. And then the D.A.'s office worked behind the scenes to replace Ito with a more, shall we say, compliant judge.

Subsequently, The Pentagon claimed that the decision that Brownback would resign was mutual. But Kohlmann issued a statement on June 2, 2008, that Brownback had been willing to continue to serve as a military judge. Brownback was a retired officer who had been recalled to active duty in 2004 to serve as the first judge on the first Military Commissions. Kohlmann said "My detailing of another judge was completely unrelated to any actions that Col. Brownback has taken in this or any other case. Any suggestion that Col. Brownback asked to return to retired status before the case of US v. Khadr was completed is also incorrect."

Lieutenant Commander William Kuebler, Omar Khadr's assigned military lawyer, noted that authorities had been advertising for new officers to volunteer to serve on the Military Commissions, and called the decision "odd to say the least". According to Carol J. Williams, writing in the Los Angeles Times Kuebler said:

We need to investigate the matter further. Whatever the case, this seriously undermines whatever integrity these proceedings possessed before.

== Khalid Sheikh Mohammed trial ==
In September 2008, he presided as the judge at the trial of Khalid Sheikh Mohammed.

== Marine Corps Retirement ==
In November 2008, Department of Defence officials announced that Kohlmann was relinquishing his duties as the Military Judge in the military commissions of the 9-11 hijackers. Due to his impending retirement, Kohlmann detailed Colonel Stephen Henley, U.S. Army, to replace him as the Military Judge in the 9-11 cases. Kohlmann continued to serve as the Chief Judge of the Military Commissions until December 2008. He was succeeded in that position by Colonel James Pohl, U.S. Army. Kohlmann accepted a position as a civilian attorney in the Department of the Navy Office of General Counsel in January 2009.

== Civilian life ==
At it 2012 annual meeting the American Bar Association hosted a presentation entitled "The Renewed Trials by Military Commission Under the Obama Administration: An Historical Perspective". Kohlmann and several other current and former key figures in the military commission system participated in the presentation.

== See also ==
- Guantanamo military commission Presiding Officers
