= Adel Hassan Hamad =

- Born: 1958; Port Sudan, Sudan
- Arrested: July 18, 2002
- Died: 6 March 2026 (aged 67–68); Port Sudan, Sudan
- Detained at: Guantanamo
- ISN: 940
- Charge: No charge
- Status: Repatriated
- Occupation: Hospital administrator

Adel Hassan Hamad was a citizen of Sudan, who was held in the United States Guantanamo Bay detention camp, in Cuba. Joint Task Force Guantanamo counter-terrorism analysts estimate he was born in 1958, in Port Sudan, Sudan. Adel Hassan was repatriated to Sudan without charges on December 12, 2007.

== Representing Adel: The Case of Guantanamo Detainee 940 ==
William Teesdale, a Portland, Oregon public defender, who is part of a team defending several Guantanamo captives, wrote a description of his team's work representing Adel. He wrote:

"Then, in May, 2005, the Government produced the factual return, as ordered by the District Court. We learned something stunning. There was a dissenting voice on the military CSRT panel that declared Adel an Enemy Combatant. An army major, whose name is classified, had the courage to file a dissenting report calling the result in Adel’s case 'unconscionable.'"

Teesdale described traveling to Afghanistan, and searching for witnesses who could prove Adel's innocence. Teesdale wrote:

"All of the information gathered in this investigation was filed with the court in Mr. Hamad’s case in the form of a motion for summary judgment. On October 17, 2006 President Bush signed the Military Commissions Act, which attempts to strip the federal courts of jurisdiction to hear Guantanamo detainee habeas cases. All of our cases are presently stayed pending resolution of this issue."

== Habeas corpus ==
On October 5, 2007 the lawyers for Adel Hassan Hamad filed an affidavit from an officer who had served with OARDEC who had criticisms of the process. The officer, an Army reservist whose name was redacted, was a prosecutor in civilian life. He wrote of the Tribunals: ``"training was minimal" -and- ``"the process was not well defined". The officer had sat on 49 Tribunals.

CBS News reports that the unnamed officer is a Major, who participated in meetings with the admiral in charge of OARDEC to discuss six instances where Tribunals that had determined captives were innocent had those determinations reversed by extraordinary second Tribunals. CBS News speculated that the Army major was the Tribunal member who recorded a minority opinion in Adel Hassan Hamad's case, calling his detention "unconscionable" because it was not based on sufficient evidence.

The Army major has described "acrimony" at a meeting convened to discuss why some Tribunals determined Uyghur captives in Guantanamo were not enemy combatants, when other Tribunals determined they were, even though the Uyghurs cases were so similar.

James R. Crisfield, the Legal Advisor who reviewed Tribunal determinations for "legal sufficiency" commented on the reasoning of the "dissenting Tribunal member":

The dissenting tribunal member also opined that there was insufficient evidence to prove that the detainee was part of or supporting al Qaeda forces engaged in hostilities against the U.S. or its coalition partners. In analyzing whether there was sufficient evidence to support a Tribunal's decision I have customarily used the test of whether there was sufficient evidence for a reasonable finder of fact to have found the detainee was an enemy combatant by a preponderance of the evidence. Given the low evidentiary hurdle posed by a preponderance of the evidence standard and the rebuttable presumption of genuiness and accuracy that attaches to the Government evidence, I believe that that the test is satisfied in this case. That is to say that reasonable finders of face could determine that this detainee meets the definition of "enemy combatant" based on the evidence presented.

== Release ==
He and fellow Sudanese Salim Mahmud Adam were repatriated on December 13, 2007.

== Lawsuit ==
On May 14, 2008 the Daily Times of Pakistan reported that "Salim Mahmud Adam" and "Adel Hasan Hamad" had announced plans to sue the United States government over their detention. The article reports that he told the Daily Times that his 2004 Combatant Status Review Tribunal had cleared him of the allegation that he was an "enemy combatant".

Hassan filed suit against the government and several individuals in federal district court in Seattle in April, 2010. His case was bolstered by an affidavit from Colonel Lawrence Wilkerson, a former aide to Secretary of State Colin Powell, who stated that top U.S. officials, including George W. Bush, Dick Cheney, and Donald Rumsfeld, had known that the majority of the detainees initially sent to Guantánamo were innocent, but that the detainees had been kept there for reasons of political expedience.

== Family ==
Hamad had a daughter who was born after his arrest and who died before his release for lack of medical care.

== Death ==
Hamad died in Port Sudan on 6 March 2026 of injuries related to a fall. He was 67.

== See also ==
- Bagram torture and prisoner abuse
