= Khalid Sheikh Mohammed =

Pakistani militant (born 1965)

Khalid Sheikh Mohammed خالد شیخ محمد
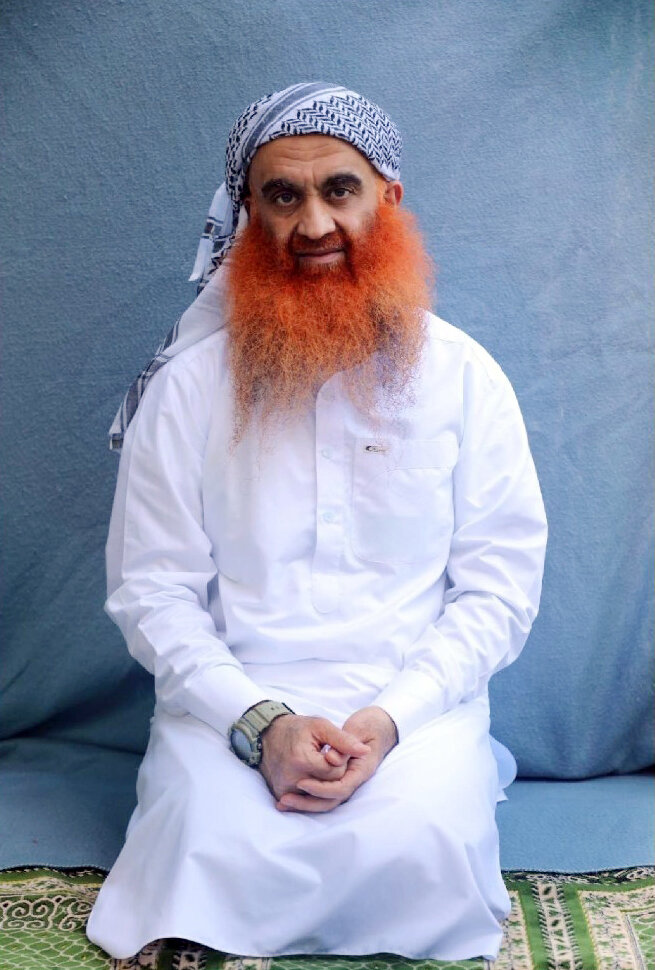
- Mohammed in Guantanamo, 2022
- Born: 14 April 1965 (age 61); Kuwait City, Kuwait
- Arrested: 1 March 2003; Rawalpindi, Pakistan
- Detained at: Guantanamo Bay detention camp
- ISN: 10024
- Charges: First-degree murder (2,977 counts); Attacking civilians; Attacking civilian objects; Intentionally causing serious bodily injury; Murder in violation of the law of war; Destruction of property in violation of the law of war; Hijacking or hazarding a vessel or aircraft; Terrorism; Providing material support for terrorism
- Status: Detained; awaiting trial
- Children: 8
- Relatives: Zahid Al-Sheikh (brother); Ramzi Yousef (nephew); Ammar al-Baluchi (nephew)

Khalid Sheikh Mohammed (born 14 April 1965; Urdu: خالد شیخ محمد; sometimes also spelled Shaykh; and known by at least 50 pseudonyms including his initials KSM) is a Kuwaiti-born Pakistani militant, and the former head of propaganda for al-Qaeda. As of 2026, he is held by the United States at the Guantanamo Bay detention camp under terrorism-related charges. He was named as "the principal architect of the 9/11 attacks" in the 2004 9/11 Commission Report.

Mohammed was a member of Osama bin Laden's militant organisation al-Qaeda, leading al-Qaeda's propaganda operations from around 1999 until late 2001. Mohammed was captured on 1 March 2003, in the Pakistani city of Rawalpindi by a combined operation of the U.S. Central Intelligence Agency (CIA) and Pakistan's Inter-Services Intelligence (ISI). Immediately after his capture, Mohammed was taken to secret CIA prison sites in Afghanistan, then Poland, where he was interrogated by U.S. operatives. By December 2006, he had been transferred to military custody at Guantanamo Bay detention camp.

Mohammed is widely regarded as the chief planner of the September 11 attacks. The United States government has alleged that he further participated in planning Richard Reid's shoe bombing attempt to attack an airliner; the 2002 Bali bombings in Indonesia; the 1993 World Trade Center bombing; the murder of Daniel Pearl and various foiled attacks as well as numerous other crimes. These claims have been criticised by others, such as military prosecutor Moe Davis and journalist Andrew Brown, as inadmissible due to being obtained through torture. He was charged in February 2008 with war crimes and murder by a U.S. military commission at the Guantanamo Bay detention camp, which could carry the death penalty if convicted. A 2008 decision by the United States Supreme Court had also drawn into question the legality of the methods used to gain such admissions and the admissibility of such admissions as evidence in a criminal proceeding.

On 30 August 2019, a military judge set a date of 11 January 2021 for Mohammed's death penalty trial. His trial was further postponed on 18 December 2020, due to the COVID-19 pandemic. Mohammed's trial restarted on 7 September 2021 but was postponed again for years of plea deal negotiations. On 31 July 2024, Mohammed agreed to plead guilty in exchange for a life sentence rather than a death-penalty trial. His plea deal was revoked by Secretary of Defense Lloyd Austin two days later. In July 2025, the plea deal was voided by a D.C. appeals court in a 2–1 ruling.

== Early life and education ==
Mohammed was born on 14 April 1965 in Kuwait, to Pakistani parents of Balochistan province. His father, Shaikh Muhammad Ali Dustin al-Baluchi, was a Deobandi imam in Al Ahmadi, who moved with his family from Balochistan, Pakistan to Kuwait in the 1950s. His mother was Halema Mohammed. Mohammed was raised in Badawiya, a neighbourhood of the Fahaheel suburb of Kuwait City. Mohammed is the uncle of Ramzi Yousef, who was convicted on terrorism charges for his part in the 1993 World Trade Center bombing, and Ammar Al Baluchi, who is accused of involvement in multiple terror plots. Khalid Sheikh Mohammed is one of at least five siblings -- four boys and a girl. His brothers' names are Zahed (pious); Abed (worshipper), and Aref (knowledgeable). Mohammed is fluent in Balochi, Urdu, Arabic, and English.

According to U.S. federal documents, in 1982 he had heard Abdulrab Rasul Sayyaf's speech in which a call for jihad against the Soviets was declared. At age 16, he joined the Muslim Brotherhood. After graduating from high school in 1983, Mohammed travelled to the United States and enrolled at Chowan University in Murfreesboro, North Carolina. He later transferred to North Carolina Agricultural and Technical State University and received a Bachelor of Science (BS) in mechanical engineering in 1986.

The following year, he went to Peshawar, Pakistan, where he and his brothers, including Zahed, joined the mujahideen forces engaged in the Soviet–Afghan War. He attended the Sada training camp run by the Arab jihadist Abdallah Azzam, and after that he worked for the magazine al-Bunyan al-Marsous, produced by Sayyaf's rebel group, the Islamic Union for the Liberation of Afghanistan. In 1992, he received a master's degree in Islamic Culture and History through correspondence classes from Punjab University in Pakistan. He gained combat experience in Bosnia where he fought for the mujahideen. By 1993, Mohammed had married and moved his family to Qatar, where he took a position as project engineer with the Qatari Ministry of Electricity and Water. He began to travel to different countries from that time onward.

The U.S.' 9/11 Commission Report notes that, "By his own account, KSM's animosity toward the United States stemmed not from his experiences there as a student, but rather from his violent disagreement with U.S. foreign policy favoring Israel."

However, on 29 August 2009, The Washington Post reported from U.S. intelligence sources that Mohammed's time in the U.S. contributed to his radicalisation:

"KSM's limited and negative experience in the United States—which included a brief jail stay because of unpaid bills—almost certainly helped propel him on his path to becoming a terrorist," according to this intelligence summary. "He stated that his contact with Americans, while minimal, confirmed his view that the United States was a debauched and racist country."

== Terrorist activities ==
=== Operation Bojinka ===
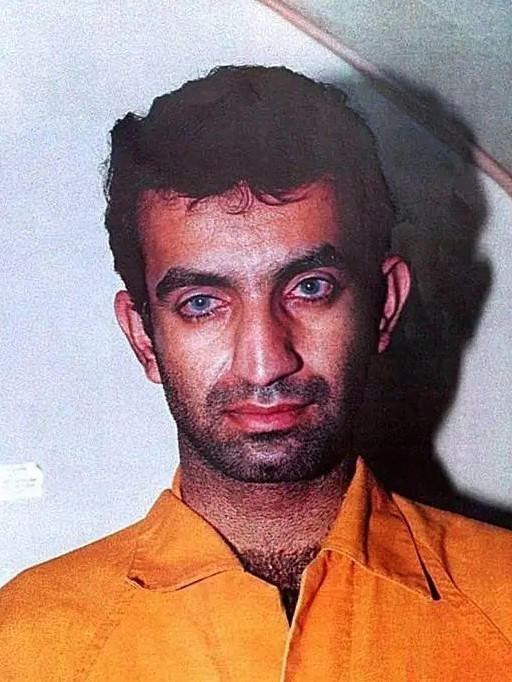
Ramzi Yousef

Mohammed travelled to the Philippines in 1994 to work with his nephew Ramzi Yousef on the Bojinka plot, a Manila-based plot to destroy 12 commercial airliners flying routes between the United States, East Asia, and Southeast Asia. He identified as a Saudi or a Qatari plywood exporter and used the aliases "Abdul Majid" and "Salem Ali." The 9/11 Commission Report says that "this marked the first time KSM took part in the actual planning of a terrorist operation."

Using airline timetables, Khalid Sheikh Mohammed and Ramzi Yousef devised a scheme whereby five men could, in a single day, board 12 flights—two each for three of the men, three each for the other two—assemble and deposit their bombs and exit the planes, leaving timers to ignite the bombs up to several days afterward. By the time the bombs exploded, the men would be far away and far from reasonable suspicion. The math was simple: 12 flights with at least 400 people per flight. Somewhere in the neighborhood of 5,000 deaths. It would be a day of glory for them, calamity for the Americans they supposed would fill the aircraft.

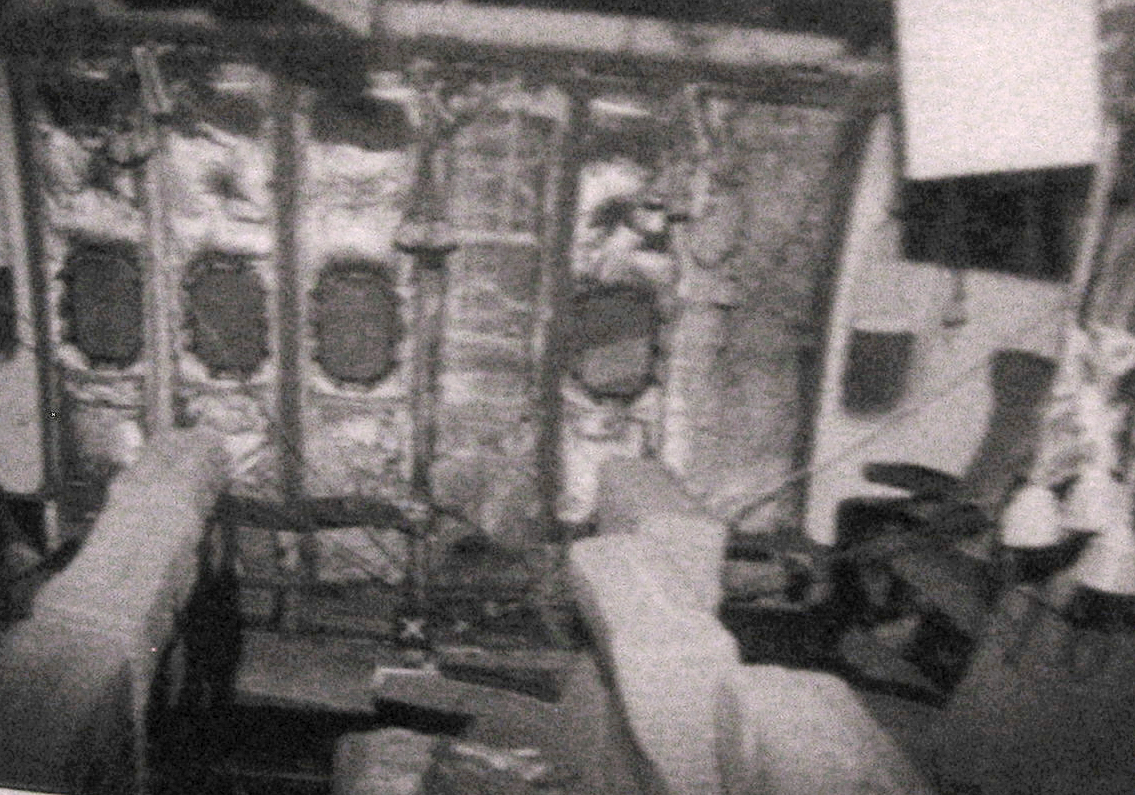
The interior of Philippine Airlines Flight 434 after its bombing

In December 1994, Ramzi Yousef had engaged in a test of a bomb on Philippine Airlines Flight 434 using only about ten per cent of the explosives that were to be used in each of the bombs to be planted on U.S. airliners. The test resulted in the death of a Japanese national on board a flight from the Philippines to Japan. Mohammed conspired with Yousef in the plot until it was uncovered on 6 January 1995. Yousef was captured 7 February of that same year.

Mohammed was indicted on terrorism charges in the United States District Court for the Southern District of New York in January 1996 for his alleged involvement in Operation Bojinka, and was subsequently on 10 October 2001 listed as one of the FBI's 22 Most Wanted Terrorists. In early 1996, Mohammed returned to Afghanistan to avoid capture by U.S. authorities. In his flight from Qatar, he was sheltered by Sheikh Abdullah Al Thani, who was the Qatari Minister of Religious Affairs in 1996.

=== Relationship with Osama bin Laden ===
By the time the Bojinka plot was discovered, Mohammed had returned to Qatar and his job as a project engineer at the country's Ministry of Electricity and Water. He travelled in 1995 to Sudan, Yemen, Malaysia, and Brazil to visit elements of the worldwide jihadist community, although no evidence connects him to specific terrorist actions in any of those locations. On his trip to Sudan, he attempted to meet with Osama bin Laden, who was at the time living there, aided by Sudanese political leader Hassan al-Turabi. After the U.S. asked the Qatari government to arrest Mohammed in January 1996, he fled to Afghanistan, where he renewed his alliance with Abdul Rasul Sayyaf. Later that year, he formed a working relationship with Bin Laden, who had settled there.

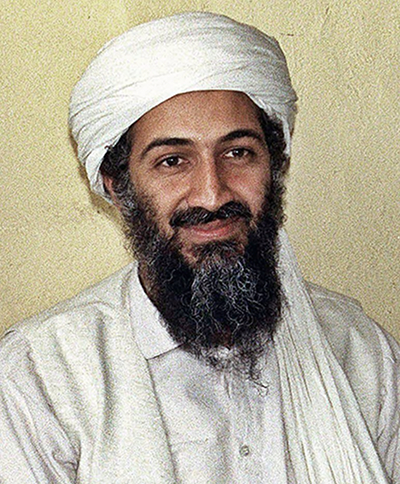
Osama bin Laden

Bin Laden and his colleagues relocated their operations to Afghanistan at this time. Mohammed Atef, bin Laden's chief of operations and also known at the time as Abu Hafs al-Masri, arranged a meeting between bin Laden and Mohammed in Tora Bora sometime in mid-1996, in which Mohammed outlined a plan that would eventually become the quadruple hijackings in 2001. Bin Laden urged Mohammed to become a fully fledged member of al-Qaeda, but he continued to refuse such a commitment until around early 1999, after the 1998 U.S. embassy bombings in Nairobi and Dar es Salaam.

In 1997, Mohammed moved his family from Iran to Karachi, Pakistan. That year, he tried unsuccessfully to join mujahideen leader Ibn al-Khattab in Chechnya, another area of special interest to Mohammed. Unable to travel to Chechnya, he returned to Afghanistan. He ultimately accepted bin Laden's invitation to move to Kandahar and join al-Qaeda as a fully fledged member. Eventually, he became leader of al-Qaeda's media committee.

=== Plan for the 11 September attacks ===
The first hijack plan that Mohammed presented to the leadership of al-Qaeda called for several aeroplanes on both US east and west coasts to be hijacked and flown into targets. His plan evolved from an earlier foiled plot known as the Bojinka plot (see above). Bin Laden rejected some potential targets suggested by Mohammed, such as the U.S. Bank Tower in Los Angeles, as he wished to simplify the attacks.

In late 1998 or early 1999, bin Laden approved for Mohammed to organise the plot. Meetings in early 1999 took place with Khalid Sheikh Mohammed, Osama bin Laden, and his military chief, Mohammed Atef. Bin Laden led the plot and provided financial support. He was also involved in selecting the participants, including choosing Mohamed Atta as the lead hijacker. Khalid Sheikh provided operational support, such as selecting targets and helping arrange travel for the hijackers. Atef directed the hijackers' actions.

After Atta was chosen as the leader of the mission, "he met with Bin Laden to discuss the targets: the World Trade Center, which represented the U.S. economy; the Pentagon, a symbol of the U.S. military; and the U.S. Capitol, the perceived source of U.S. policy in support of Israel. The White House was also on the list, as Bin Laden considered it a political symbol and wanted to attack it as well." If any pilot could not reach his intended target, he was to crash the plane.

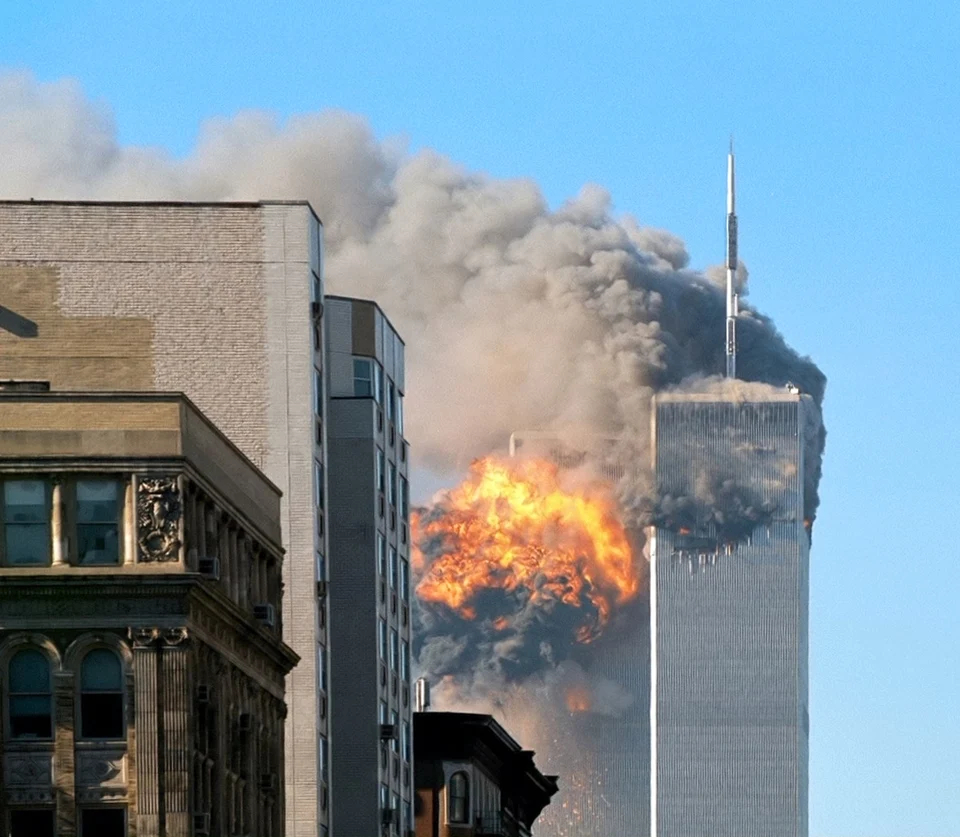
United Airlines Flight 175 crashes into 2 WTC, while 1 WTC burns from American Airlines Flight 11's prior crash

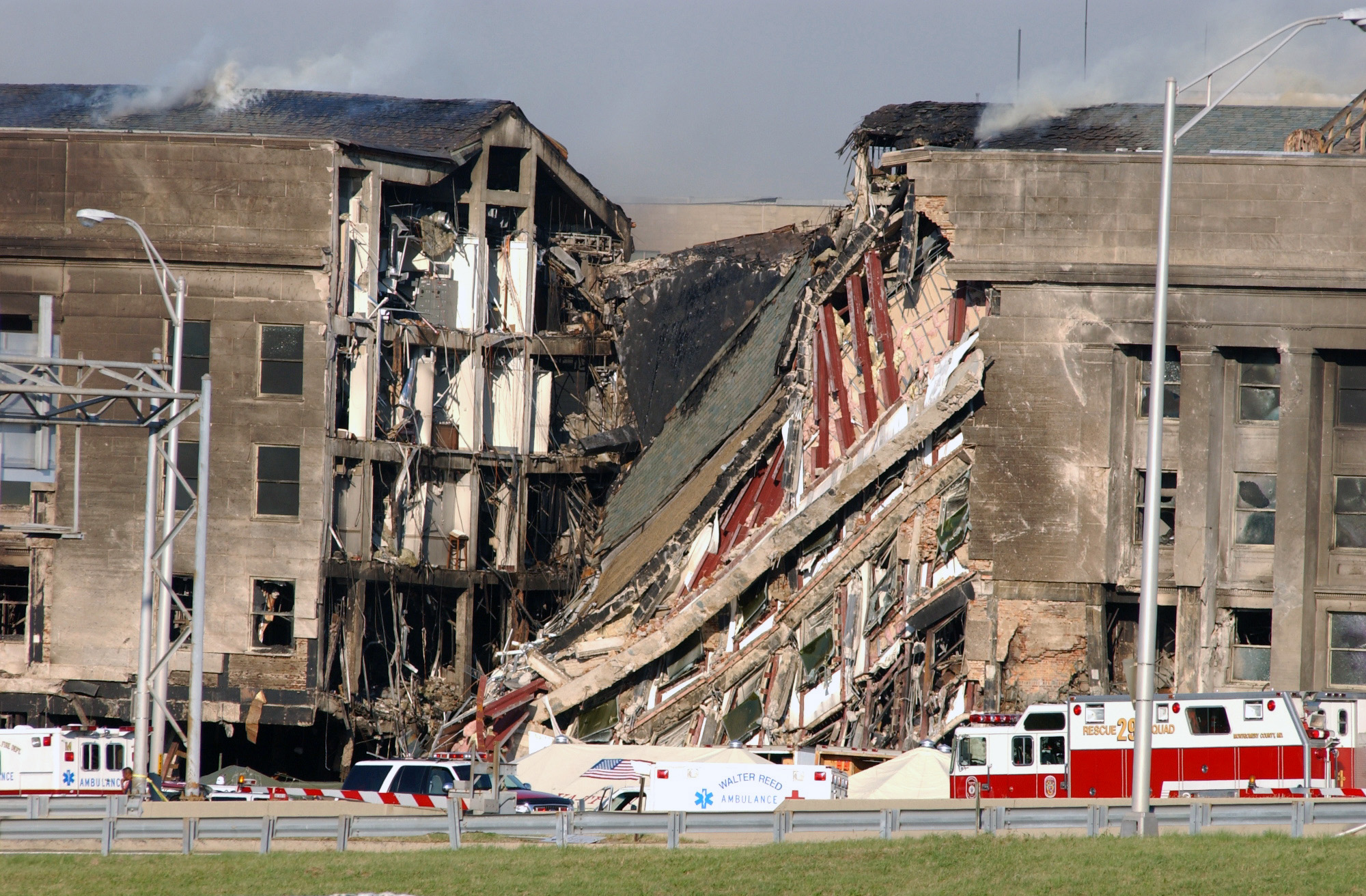
Damage to the Pentagon in Arlington, Virginia, after American Airlines Flight 77's crash

According to testimony by Philip Zelikow, bin Laden was motivated by a desire to punish the USA for supporting Israel and wanted to move up the attack date. Mohammed argued for ensuring the teams were prepared:

[Bin Laden] allegedly told KSM it would be sufficient simply to down the planes and not hit specific targets. KSM stood his ground, arguing that the operation would not be successful unless the pilots were fully trained and the hijacking teams were larger.

In a 2002 interview with Al Jazeera journalist Yosri Fouda, Mohammed admitted that he and Ramzi bin al-Shibh were involved in the "Holy Tuesday operation". ("Holy Tuesday operation" was the terrorists' code name for the 9/11 attacks, which took place on a Tuesday.) KSM, however, disputes this claim via his Personal Representative: "I never stated to the Al Jazeera reporter that I was the head of the al-Qaeda military committee."

In another interview, in April 2002, with Yosri Fouda, Mohammed and al-Shibh described the preparations for 9/11 attacks and said that they first thought of "striking at a couple of nuclear facilities" in the U.S. but then "it was eventually decided to leave out nuclear targets for now."

=== Daniel Pearl murder ===
According to intelligence expert Rohan Gunaratna, "Daniel Pearl was going in search of the al-Qaeda network that was operational in Karachi, and it was at the instruction of Khalid Sheikh Mohammed that Daniel Pearl was killed." On 12 October 2006, Time magazine reported that "KSM confessed under CIA interrogation that he personally committed the murder." On 15 March 2007, the Pentagon stated that Mohammed had confessed to the murder. The statement quoted Mohammed as saying, "I decapitated with my blessed right hand the head of the American Jew, Daniel Pearl ... For those who would like to confirm, there are pictures of me on the Internet holding his head." This confession was gained under torture, and Mohammed listed many other crimes at the same time.

The Federal Bureau of Investigation used vein matching to determine that the perpetrator in the video of the killing of Pearl was most likely Mohammed, notably through identifying a "bulging vein" running across his hand. Concerned that the confession obtained through waterboarding would not hold up in court, federal officials used this forensic evidence to bolster their case.

== Capture, interrogation, and torture (2003–2006) ==
On 11 September 2002, members of Pakistani Inter-Services Intelligence (ISI) claimed to have killed or captured Sheikh Mohammed during a raid in Karachi that resulted in bin al-Shibh's capture. This claim was then subsequently proven as baseless.

In January 2003, Sheikh Mohammed visited Osama bin Laden in the Swat District where he lived with his youngest wife Amal.

Mohammed was captured in Rawalpindi, Pakistan (about 20 kilometres south-west of Islamabad), on 1 March 2003, by the Pakistani ISI, possibly in a joint action with the CIA's Special Activities Division paramilitary operatives and officers of the American Diplomatic Security Service. He has been in U.S. custody since that time. Initially held in the CIA's Salt Pit (Cobalt) prison in Afghanistan, after just a "few minutes" of questioning at Cobalt, he was subject to "enhanced interrogation techniques." He was slapped, grabbed in the face, placed in stress positions, placed in standing sleep deprivation, doused with water, and subjected to rectal rehydration multiple times, without a determination of medical need.

The International Red Cross and Human Rights Watch consider that the harsh interrogation techniques, including waterboarding, which he received from U.S. agents amount to torture. Mohammed was also subject to sleep deprivation for a period of 7 1/2 days, during much of which he was forced to stand.

According to later reports, Mohammed initially told American interrogators he would not answer any questions until he was provided with a lawyer, which was refused. He claims to have been kept naked for more than a month during his isolation and interrogations, and said he was "questioned by an unusual number of female handlers".

A CIA document reveals that Jane Harman and Porter Goss of the House Intelligence Committee were briefed on 13 July 2004, by the CIA deputy director for operations James Pavitt, General Counsel Scott Muller, and CIA Inspector General John L. Helgerson on the status of the interrogation process of Mohammed. The document states:

... the CIA was seeking renewed policy approval from the NSC Principals to continue using the enhanced interrogation techniques.

On 12 October 2004, Human Rights Watch reported that 11 suspects, including Khalid Sheikh Mohammed, had "disappeared" to a semi-secret prison in Jordan, and may have been tortured there under the direction of the CIA. At the time, Jordanian and American officials denied those allegations.

In October 2006, Mohammed described his mistreatment and torture in detention, including the waterboarding, to a representative of the Red Cross. Mohammed said that he had provided a lot of false information, which he had supposed the interrogators wanted to hear, in order to stop the mistreatment. During his 2006 interview with the Red Cross, Mohammed claimed to have been waterboarded in five different sessions during the first month of interrogation in his third place of detention.

During 2003, Mohammed was held at a secret CIA prison, or black site, in Poland, where the CIA waterboarded him at least 183 times. He was then transferred to another secret CIA prison in Romania. While the Justice Department memos did not explain exactly what the numbers represented, a U.S. official with knowledge of the interrogation programmes explained the 183 figure represented the number of times water was applied to the detainee's face during the waterboarding sessions, rather than separate sessions.

== Guantanamo Bay and legal proceedings (2006–present) ==
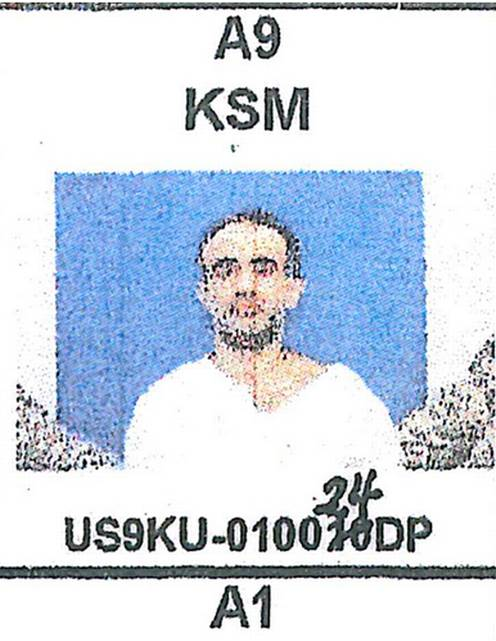
Mohammed's mug shot shortly after his transfer to the Guantanamo Bay detention camp in September 2006. The photo was obtained by reporters of McClatchyDC.

In September 2006, the U.S. government announced it had moved Mohammed from a secret CIA prison (or black site) to military custody at the Guantanamo Bay detention camp. On 6 September 2006, U.S. president George W. Bush confirmed, for the first time, that the CIA had held "high-value detainees" for interrogation in secret prisons around the world. He also announced that 14 senior captives, including Khalid Sheikh Mohammed, were being transferred from CIA custody, to military custody, at Guantanamo Bay detention camp and that these 14 captives could now expect to face charges before Guantanamo military commissions.

The Department of Defense announced on 9 August 2007, that all 14 of the "high-value detainees" who had been transferred to Guantanamo from the CIA's black sites, had been officially classified as "enemy combatants". Although judges Peter Brownback and Keith J. Allred had ruled two months earlier that only "illegal enemy combatants" could face military commissions, the Department of Defense waived the qualifier and said that all 14 men could now face charges before Guantanamo military commissions.

In March 2007, after four years in captivity, including six months of detention and alleged torture at Guantanamo Bay, Mohammed—as alleged by a Combatant Status Review Tribunal at the camp—stated that he masterminded the 11 September attacks, and confessed to the 1993 World Trade Center bombing, the 2002 Bali bombings in Indonesia, and various foiled attacks, such as Richard Reid's attempt to destroy an airliner using a bomb hidden in his shoe. A statement he read during a Combatant Status Review Tribunal stated: "I was responsible for the 9/11 operation from A to Z".

According to the "unclassified summary of evidence" presented during the CSRT hearing, a computer hard drive seized during the capture of Khalid Sheikh Mohammed contained the following:

- information about the four aeroplanes hijacked on 11 September 2001, including code names, airline company, flight number, target, pilot name and background information, and names of the hijackers
- photographs of 19 individuals identified as the 11 September hijackers
- a document that listed the pilot licence fees for Mohamed Atta and biographies for some of the 11 September hijackers
- images of passports and an image of Mohamed Atta
- transcripts of chat sessions belonging to at least one of the 11 September hijackers
- three letters from Osama bin Laden
- spreadsheets that describe financial assistance to families of known al-Qaeda members
- a letter to the United Arab Emirates threatening attack if their government continued to help the United States
- a document that summarised operational procedures and training requirements of an al-Qaeda cell
- a list of killed and wounded al-Qaeda militants.

At the hearing, Khalid Sheikh Mohammed said the computer belonged not to him, but to Mustafa Ahmad al-Hawsawi, arrested together with him.

On 5 February 2008, the CIA director Michael Hayden told a Senate committee that his agents had used waterboarding on Khalid Sheikh Mohammed. In June 2008, anonymous CA officers told the New York Times that Mohammed had been held in a black site or secret facility in Poland near Szymany Airport, about 100 miles north of Warsaw. There he was interrogated under waterboarding before he began to "cooperate".

In 2009, Mohammed described his actions and motivations in a document publicly released and known as The Islamic Response to the Government's Nine Accusations. On 9 September 2009, photographs of Khalid Sheikh Mohammed and Ammar al Baluchi were published on the Internet and widely in US and international media.

In 2009, the French government decided to try Khalid Sheikh Mohammed in absentia on terrorism charges with respect to the Ghriba synagogue bombing on the Tunisian island of Djerba in 2002, which killed 14 German tourists, five Tunisians and two French nationals. They intended to charge him along with the captured German national Christian Ganczarski and Tunisian Walid Nawar. French judges later decided to separate Khalid Sheikh Mohammed's case from those of Ganczarski and Nawar and try him separately at a later date.

In April 2011, the British newspaper The Telegraph said it received leaked documents regarding the Guantanamo Bay interrogations of Khalid Sheikh Mohammed. The documents cited Mohammed as saying that, if bin Laden is captured or killed by the Coalition of the Willing, an al-Qaeda sleeper cell would detonate a "weapon of mass destruction" in a "secret location" in Europe, and promised it would be "a nuclear hellstorm".

In January 2014, a 36-page "nonviolence manifesto" written by KSM was declassified and released by the US government. The title is "Khalid Sheikh Mohammad's Statement to the Crusaders of the Military Commissions in Guantanamo." The document outlines 3 parts, but appears to be just the first section, describing "the path to happiness." The subject writes to his captors and appears interested in converting his wider audience to Islam. The notes contain eight books with three Western authors and pencilled initials with the date 31 October 2013.

In November 2014, a Turkish manufacturer of over-the-counter hair removal cream was found to be using an image of a dishevelled Mohammed in adverts for their product.

=== Report that interrogators abused his children ===
Ali Khan, the father of Majid Khan, another one of the 14 "high-value detainees", released an unsubstantiated affidavit on 16 April 2006, that reported that interrogators subjected Khalid Sheikh Mohammed's young children to abusive interrogation.

Khan's affidavit quoted another of his sons, Mohammed Khan:

The Pakistani guards told my son that the boys were kept in a separate area upstairs, and were denied food and water by other guards. They were also mentally tortured by having ants or other creatures put on their legs to scare them and get them to say where their father was hiding.

=== Combatant Status Review Tribunal ===
In March 2007, Mohammed testified before a closed-door hearing in Guantanamo Bay. According to transcripts of the hearing released by the Pentagon, he said, "I was responsible for the 9/11 operation, from A to Z." The transcripts also show him confessing to:

- Organising the 1993 World Trade Center bombing
- The Bali nightclub bombings
- Richard Reid's attempted shoe bombing
- Planning the attacks on Heathrow Airport and Big Ben clock tower in London
- Daniel Pearl's murder in 2002
- Planned assassination attempts on Pope John Paul II, Pervez Musharraf and Bill Clinton

On 15 March 2007, BBC News reported that "Transcripts of his testimony were translated from Arabic and edited by the U.S. Department of Defense to remove sensitive intelligence material before release. It appeared, from a judge's question, that Khalid Sheikh Mohammed had made allegations of torture in US custody." In the Defense Department transcript, Mohammed said his statement was not made under duress but Mohammed and human rights advocates have alleged that he was tortured. CIA officials previously stated that "Mohammed lasted the longest under waterboarding, two and a half minutes, before beginning to talk." Legal experts say this could taint all his statements. Forensic psychiatrist Michael Welner, M.D., an expert in false confessions, observed from the testimony transcript that his concerns about his family may have been far more influential in soliciting Mohammed's cooperation than any earlier reported mistreatment.

One CIA official cautioned that "many of Mohammed's claims during interrogation were 'white noise' designed to send the U.S. on wild goose chases or to get him through the day's interrogation session." For example, according to Mike Rogers, a former FBI agent and the top Republican on the terrorism panel of the House Intelligence Committee, he admitted responsibility for the Bali nightclub bombing, but his involvement "could have been as small as arranging a safe house for travel. It could have been arranging finance." Mohammed also made the admission that he was "responsible for the 1993 World Trade Center Operation," which killed six and injured more than 1,000 when a bomb was detonated in an underground garage, Mohammed did not plan the attack, but he may have supported it. Michael Welner noted that by offering legitimate information to interrogators, Mohammed had secured the leverage to provide misinformation as well.

As an example of this the article discloses that although the George W. Bush administration made claims that the water-boarding (simulated drowning) of Mohammed produced vital information that allowed them to break up a plot to attack the U.S. Bank Tower (formerly Library Tower and First Interstate Bank World Center) in Los Angeles in 2002, this has been proven to be untrue. In 2002, Mohammed was busy evading capture in Pakistan. The claims by former Attorney General Michael Mukasey and former CIA director of the National Clandestine Service, Jose Rodriguez, that the torture of Khalid Sheikh Mohammed produced the most significant lead in finding bin Laden was rejected by U.S. Senator John McCain, "The trail to bin Laden did not begin with a disclosure from Khalid Sheikh Mohammed, who was waterboarded 183 times ... not only did the use of 'enhanced interrogation techniques' on Khalid Sheikh Mohammed not provide us with key leads on bin Laden's courier, Abu Ahmed; it actually produced false and misleading information."

In a 29 September 2006, speech, Bush stated:

Once captured, Abu Zubaydah, Ramzi bin al Shibh, and Khalid Sheikh Mohammed were taken into custody of the Central Intelligence Agency. The questioning of these and other suspected terrorists provided information that helped us protect the American people. They helped us break up a cell of Southeast Asian terrorist operatives that had been groomed for attacks inside the United States. They helped us disrupt an al-Qaeda operation to develop anthrax for terrorist attacks. They helped us stop a planned strike on a U.S. Marine camp in Djibouti, and to prevent a planned attack on the U.S. Consulate in Karachi, and to foil a plot to hijack passenger planes and to fly them into Heathrow Airport and London's Canary Wharf.

==== List of confessions ====
Mohammed has made at least 31 confessions:

- The February 1993 bombing of the World Trade Center in New York City
- The September 11 attacks on the World Trade Center and the Pentagon using hijacked commercial airliners
- A failed "shoe bomber" operation
- The October 2002 attack in Kuwait
- The beheading of Wall Street Journal reporter Daniel Pearl
- The 2002 Bali bombings, Pady's and Sari's club bombings in Bali, Indonesia
- A plan for a "second wave" of attacks on major U.S. landmarks after the 9/11 attacks, including the Library Tower in Los Angeles, the Willis Tower (formerly Sears Tower) in Chicago, the Empire State Building in New York City, and what has been reported as the Plaza Bank Building in Seattle, although there is no Plaza Bank Building; there is a Safeco Plaza and Columbia Center, the city's tallest skyscraper
- Plots to attack oil tankers and U.S. naval ships in the Straits of Hormuz, the Straits of Gibraltar and in Singapore
- A plan to blow up the Panama Canal
- Plans to assassinate Jimmy Carter
- A plot to blow up suspension bridges in New York City
- A plan to destroy the Sears Tower in Chicago with burning fuel trucks
- Plans to destroy London Heathrow Airport, Canary Wharf and Big Ben in London
- A planned attack on many nightclubs in Thailand
- A plot targeting the New York Stock Exchange and other U.S. financial targets
- A plan to destroy buildings in Eilat, Israel
- Plans to destroy U.S. embassies in Indonesia, Australia and Japan in 2002
- Plots to destroy Israeli embassies in India, Azerbaijan, the Philippines and Australia
- Surveying and financing an attack on an Israeli El-Al flight from Bangkok
- Sending several "mujahideen" into Israel to survey "strategic targets" with the intention of attacking them
- The November 2002 suicide bombing of a hotel in Mombasa, Kenya, and failed attempt to shoot down an Israeli passenger jet leaving Mombasa Airport
- Plans to attack U.S. targets in Korea
- Providing financial support for a plan to attack U.S., British and Jewish targets in Turkey
- Surveillance of U.S. nuclear power plants in order to attack them
- A plot to attack NATO's headquarters in Europe
- Planning and surveillance in a 1995 plan (the "Bojinka plot") to bomb 12 American passenger jets
- The planned assassination attempt against then-U.S. president Bill Clinton during a mid-1990s trip to the Philippines
- "Shared responsibility" for a plot to kill Pope John Paul II
- Plans to assassinate Pakistani President Pervez Musharraf
- An attempt to attack a U.S. oil company in Sumatra, Indonesia, "owned by the Jewish former [U.S.] Secretary of State Henry Kissinger"

After Mohammed arrived at Guantanamo, a team of FBI and military interrogators tried to elicit from him the same confessions that the CIA had obtained about the 9/11 plot, but by using only legal means of interrogation. By 2008, the Bush administration believed that this so-called "Clean Team" had compiled sufficient evidence to charge Mohammed and the others with capital murder.

== Trial for role in the 11 September attacks ==
On 11 February 2008, the United States Department of Defense charged Mohammed, Ramzi bin al-Shibh, Mustafa Ahmad al-Hawsawi, Ali Abd al-Aziz Ali and Walid Bin Attash for the 11 September 2001 attacks under the military commission system, as established under the Military Commissions Act of 2006. They have reportedly been charged with the murder of almost 3,000 people, terrorism and providing material support for terrorism and plane hijacking; as well as attacking civilian objects, intentionally causing serious bodily injury and destruction of property in violation of the law of war. The charges against them list 169 overt acts allegedly committed by the defendants in furtherance of the 11 September events.

The charges include 2,977 individual counts of murder—one for each person killed in the 9/11 attacks. The prosecution is seeking the death penalty, which would require the unanimous agreement of the commission judges.

Human rights groups, including Amnesty International, Human Rights Watch and the Center for Constitutional Rights, and U.S. military defence lawyers have criticised the military commissions for lacking due process for a fair trial. Critics generally argue for the trials to be held in a federal district court, with defendants treated as criminal suspects, or by court-martial as a prisoner under the Geneva Conventions, which prohibit civilian trials for prisoners of war. Mohammed could face the death penalty under any of these systems.

Mohammed, in a letter submitted to the court on 26 July 2019, communicated the willingness to help the 9/11 attack victims and their families in their lawsuit against Saudi Arabia in exchange for the elimination of his death sentence.

The case is progressing through the legal system. In August 2019, the trial date was tentatively set for 11 January 2021, by Judge W. Shane Cohen, but this date was postponed on 18 December 2020, due to the COVID-19 pandemic. Mohammed's trial restarted on 7 September 2021.

On 31 July 2024, a guilty plea was reached with U.S. officials, which spared him from the death penalty in exchange for life in prison at ADX Florence. However, the plea deal was rescinded by Defense Secretary Lloyd Austin two days later. The plea deal was reinstated in November 2024, since the defense secretary did not have the required authority to revoke them and furthermore acted too late according to a military judge.

In July 2025, the plea deal was voided by a D.C. appeals court in a 2–1 ruling.

In August 2026, a trial date was scheduled for 5 June 2028.

On 28 August 2026, the trial judge, Lt. Col. Michael Schrama, ruled that statements Mohammed had made to FBI interrogators at Guantanamo Bay in 2007, which prosecutors had described as the government's most important evidence in the case, were not given voluntarily and could not be used against him at trial. Schrama cited an "unbroken continuation of the CIA's psychological conditioning and severe coercion" at the time of the questioning, and found that FBI agents had intentionally failed to tell Mohammed that he had a right to remain silent and to consult a lawyer. Prosecutors were given five days to decide whether to appeal.

== Khalid Sheikh Mohammed and Sulaiman Abu Ghaith ==
Khalid Sheikh Mohammed has participated as a witness in the trials of two alleged al-Qaeda members, Zacarias Moussaoui and Salim Hamdan. Los Angeles Times reporter Richard Serrano wrote:

"In 2006, his interrogation summaries were read aloud in the capital murder trial of Zacarias Moussaoui, the so-called 20th hijacker, and Moussaoui was spared the death penalty. Two years later, different Mohammed statements were read in a military commission trial, or tribunal, that led to the release from Guantanamo Bay of Osama bin Laden's chauffeur, Salim Hamdan."

Stanley Cohen, an attorney for Sulaiman Abu Ghaith, requested to interview Mohammed, who they described as "the most qualified person alive" to assist in Abu Gaith's defence. Mohammed, through his attorney David Nevin, agreed to be interviewed, but only "in the absence of government personnel whether physically present or by listening or recording remotely."

Mohammed instead drafted a 14-page statement response to 451 interrogatories submitted by Cohen. In the response, Mohammed called Abu Ghaith, a "pious man" and "spellbinding speaker" who, to the best of his knowledge, did not play any military role in al-Qaeda operations and had no military training. Mohammed argued that Western foreign policy has been hypocritical in that it allowed for the rise of the Mujahideen in the Soviet War, but that Western media has since branded the Mujahideen "terrorists" or "foreign fighters". He further claimed that the Taliban's strict Islamic rule had restored security to Afghanistan in the 1990s. U.S. District Judge Lewis A. Kaplan ruled that neither Mohammed's statement nor testimony were relevant to Abu Ghaith's trial, and thus inadmissible.

== See also ==
- Shaker Aamer – Saudi citizen held in Guantanamo Bay from 2001–2015
- The Report
