= Timeline beyond October following the September 11 attacks =

The following list contains dates beyond October 2001 involving the September 11 attacks.

== 2001 ==
=== November ===
==== Thursday, November 1, 2001 ====
- Afternoon: Deputy Mayor Anthony P. Coles meets with the two firefighter union leaders, Fire Capt. Peter L. Gorman, president of the Uniformed Fire Officers Association and Kevin E. Gallagher, president of the Uniformed Firefighters Association, at New York City Hall to discuss the firefighters' unhappiness with the October 31 decision.
- Night: The unions fax a notice to the New York firefighters to hold a demonstration on Friday morning.
- Near midnight: Rudy Giuliani calls from Yankee Stadium at the World Series to Fire Commissioner Thomas von Essen about talk of a protest.

==== Friday, November 2, 2001 ====
- At approximately 10:30 a.m. EST., emotions spilled over into violence at a two-hour protest by several hundred to a thousand firefighters near City Hall, beginning at West and Chambers Streets, to protest Giuliani's October 31st ruling to reduce the number of firefighters permitted at the World Trade Center site from 64 to 25. After firefighter Mike Heffernan, brother of John Heffernan, retired fire captain Bill Butler, father of Tommy Butler, and Kevin E. Gallagher, the president of the Uniformed Firefighters Association, speak, the assembled protesters push aside a barricade and begin walking south down West Street. At the next barricade the police move in, punches are thrown, and firefighters handcuffed. Both sides shout for understanding, and the conflict quickly subsides. The firefighters then march out to the applause of construction workers, the protest breaking up around 12:30 p.m.
- 12 firefighters (including four ranking fire officers and one fire marshal) are arrested and taken to the 28th Precinct station house in central Harlem. 5 police officers are injured, two with black eyes and facial trauma, three with neck, shoulder and back injuries.

==== Monday, November 12, 2001 ====
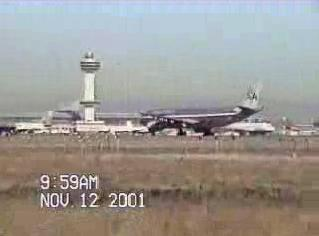
American Airlines Flight 587, moments before taking off on its final flight. The crash of Flight 587, which was as a result of pilot error, resulted in renewed fears of terrorist activity.

- Approximately 9:16 a.m. EST - American Airlines Flight 587 crashes in Belle Harbor, Queens, New York. 265 people, 260 on the plane, are killed. Originally thought to be terrorism and claimed as a victory by Al-Qaeda, an NTSB investigation finds the cause of the crash to be pilot error as a result of misuse of the aircraft's rudder; the Airbus A300 had taken off moments after a Japan Airlines Boeing 747 had taken off from the same runway at John F. Kennedy International Airport, which caused the Airbus A300 to be affected by the 747's wake turbulence. In an attempt to fight against the turbulence, the first officer repeatedly and aggressively moved the plane's rudder from extreme left to right, inflicting enough metal fatigue to cause the entire vertical stabiliser to shear off, rendering the aircraft uncontrollable. As a precaution, the Empire State Building and UN headquarters are evacuated. Months later, Abderraouf Jdey is named by Al-Qaeda operative Mohammed Jabarah as the person responsible for the disaster, but this cannot be confirmed by any source investigating the crash.

==== Monday, November 19, 2001 ====
- The Transportation Security Administration, also known as TSA, is formed.

=== December ===
==== Sunday, December 16, 2001 ====
- The last remnants of the North Tower's facade are cut down.

==== Thursday, December 20, 2001 ====
- The last fires at the World Trade Center site are extinguished.

== 2002 ==
=== February ===
==== Sunday, February 3, 2002 ====
- Super Bowl XXXVI is held in New Orleans, becoming the first sporting event designated by the Department of Homeland Security as a National Special Security Event. The pregame ceremonies and the halftime show honor the victims of 9/11.

==== Friday, February 8, 2002 ====
- At the opening ceremony of the 2002 Winter Olympics in Salt Lake City, a tattered American flag recovered from the World Trade Center site is carried into the stadium by American athletes, members of the Port Authority police, and members of the New York City police and fire departments.

=== March ===
==== Monday, March 11, 2002 ====
- Six months after the attack, numerous ceremonies of remembrance take place.
- Huffman Aviation receives a letter from the Immigration and Naturalization Service saying that Mohamed Atta and Marwan al-Shehhi had been approved for student visas to study there.
- The Tribute in Light project begins. The project goes for a month and is re-launched on September 11, 2003, to mark the second anniversary of the attack. The Tribute in Light is now done every year on September 11.

==== Tuesday, March 12, 2002 ====
- The remains of at least 11 firefighters and several civilians are found when recovery workers reach the site of what had been the South Tower lobby.

=== May ===
==== Tuesday, May 28, 2002 ====
- The last steel beam standing at the World Trade Center site is cut down and placed on a flatbed truck in a quiet ceremony, marking the end of the clean up at Ground Zero.

=== June ===
==== Tuesday, June 4, 2002 ====
- As a sign of saying thank you for the support Britain gave in the days immediately following the attacks, New York City lit the Empire State Building in purple and gold to mark the Golden Jubilee celebrations for Queen Elizabeth II.

=== August ===
==== Monday, August 19, 2002 ====
- The New York City Medical Examiner releases an updated list of World Trade Center casualties. There were 2,819 killed or missing, 4 less than the Police Department list which had been the best official tally publicly released. One name removed was that of a woman who had been listed under both her maiden and married names. The other three were of people reported missing once by people who had since not been in contact with New York City officials.

==== Tuesday, August 20, 2002 ====
- Police determine that Albert John Vaughan, 45, and George V. Sims, 46, missing and presumed dead, are alive. Vaughan has been a patient at the Rockland Psychiatric Center in Orangeburg, N.Y. Sims is a patient with amnesia and schizophrenia at a Manhattan hospital.

==== Tuesday, August 27, 2002 ====
- The Newark Star-Ledger reports that George V. Sims is alive. By this point at least 7 people on the August 19 list have been found; there are now 2,812 killed or presumed dead.

=== September ===
==== Saturday, September 7, 2002 ====
- The New York City Medical Examiner releases a new list of World Trade Center deaths. The new list has 22 fewer names than the previous one. The death toll now stands at 2801, including the dead on the airplanes but not the 10 hijackers.

==== Tuesday, September 10, 2002 ====
- The United States goes on high security alert as anniversary approaches. Other countries such as Great Britain go on similar alert status.
- Al-Jazeera releases videotapes of four of the September 11 hijackers - Ahmed al-Nami, Hamza al-Ghamdi, Ahmed al-Ghamdi and Wail al-Shehri. All four are seen talking to the camera.

==== Wednesday, September 11, 2002 ====
- Remembrance services are held throughout the USA for the first time it becomes an annual event, that becomes Patriot Day.
- The ceremony at New York City, broadcast throughout the world, falls an hour behind schedule, but is well attended. The ceremony included the reading out of the names of all the persons who died there (on both the planes and the World Trade Center) and the recitals of American historical speeches such as the Gettysburg Address. Moments of silence are observed at 8:46 a.m. and 9:03 a.m., the moments when the two planes struck the two towers, and church bells ring at 9:59 a.m. and 10:29 a.m., the moment at which the South and North towers respectively collapsed. Foreign dignitaries gather in Battery Park for the lighting of the eternal flame at sunset. President George W. Bush addresses the nation from Ellis Island an hour and a half after the lighting of the eternal flame.
- The private ceremony at The Pentagon is also well-attended, and included the President amongst its participants. A prayer is said at the end that referred to Todd Beamer's "Let's roll" remark.
- The public ceremony at Shanksville also had a large turnout. It included two flybys and a release of doves. President George W. Bush attends a private follow up service for the families of Flight 93's victims in the afternoon.
- In Karachi, wanted terrorist Ramzi bin al-Shibh (also known as Ramzi Omar) is among five alleged terrorists captured by Pakistani authorities at a Defence Housing Authority estate. Bin al-Shibh is wanted by US authorities in relation to the September 11 attacks. His capture does not become public knowledge for two days, but photographs featuring him being led away blindfolded are published on the day.

==== Thursday, September 26, 2002 ====
- The Lower Manhattan Development Corporation selects six new design teams from around the globe for the World Trade Center site.

==== Friday, September 27, 2002 ====
- The City of New York renames 81 streets, 79 in Staten Island and two in Manhattan, after victims.
- The New York Department of Environmental Conservation announces that construction equipment at the World Trade Center site will have to use ultra-low sulfur diesel fuel.

== 2003 ==
=== February ===
==== Wednesday, February 26, 2003 ====
- Daniel Libeskind's design is announced as the winner and future occupant of the former World Trade Center site. The design includes an office building and a Wedge of Light which will honor the victims of the terrorist attacks by shutting down its lights between 8:46AM and 10:28AM EST every September 11. It will also use the WTC's foundations.

=== March ===
==== March 1, 2003 ====
- Khalid Sheikh Mohammed, the mastermind of the attacks, is captured by the Pakistani ISI in Rawalpindi and handed into U.S. custody.

== 2004 ==
=== July ===
==== Sunday, July 4, 2004 ====
- The cornerstone of One World Trade Center, a building designed to replace the Twin Towers, is laid.

==== Thursday, July 22, 2004 ====
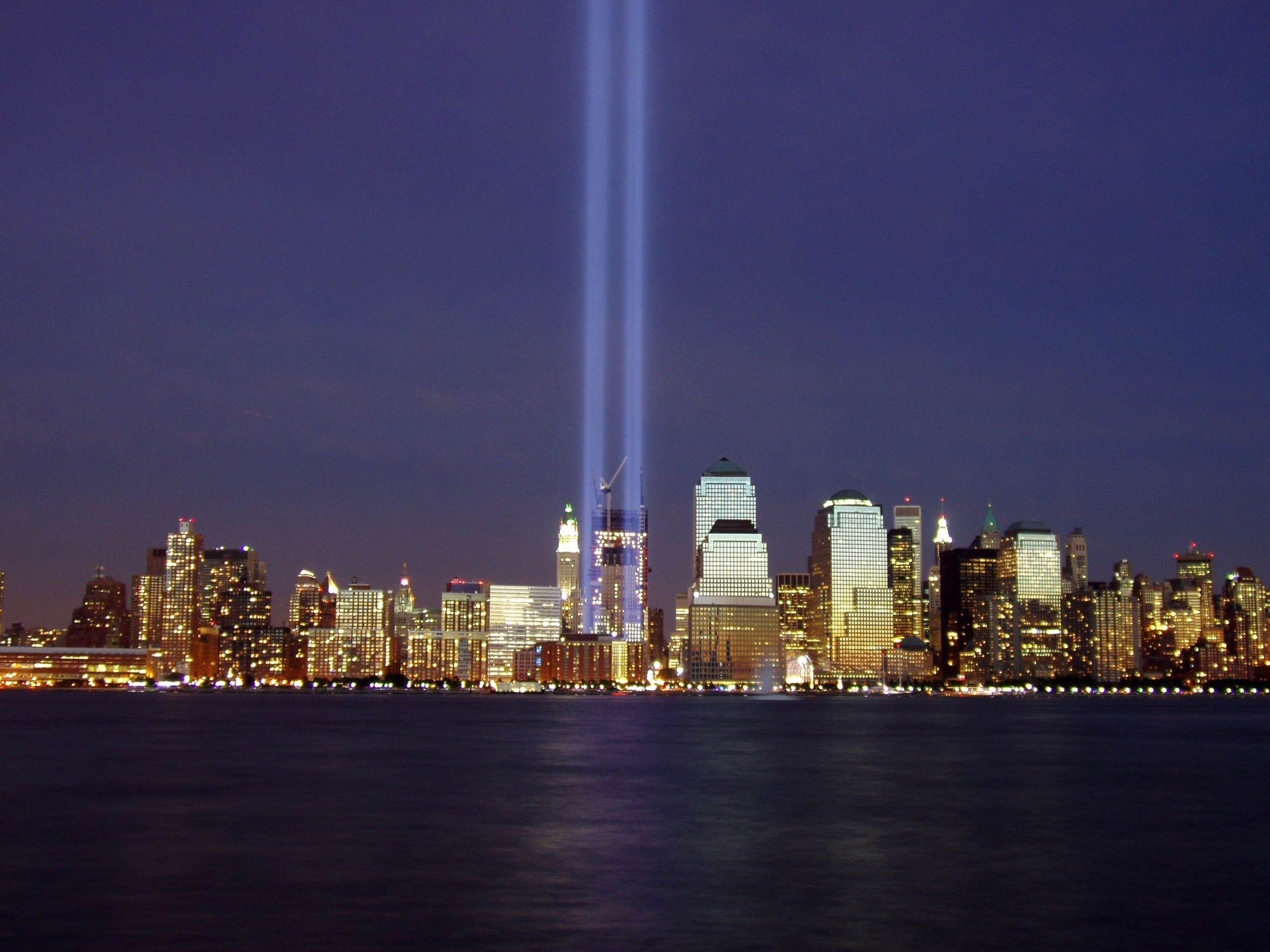
Two beams of light represent the former Twin Towers of the World Trade Center during the 2004 memorial of the September 11, 2001 attacks.

- The 9/11 Commission Report is published.

== 2005 ==
=== Monday, September 5, 2005 ===
The World Trade Center Transportation Hub begins construction at the World Trade Center site, marking the beginning of major reconstruction at the site since the September 11 attacks. The $2.2 billion transportation hub, designed by architect Santiago Calatrava, was intended to connect the PATH commuter rail system with the New York City Subway and other transportation services.

=== Tuesday, June 28, 2005 ===
The final design for One World Trade Center, then known as the Freedom Tower, is formally unveiled. The revised design incorporates a reinforced concrete base and other security measures following concerns raised by the New York City Police Department.

=== Monday, September 12, 2005 ===
The U.S. District Court for the Eastern District of Virginia begins the sentencing phase of the trial of Zacarias Moussaoui, who had pleaded guilty to conspiring to hijack aircraft and was prosecuted in connection with the September 11 attacks. The proceedings continue into 2006, when Moussaoui is sentenced to life imprisonment without the possibility of parole.

== 2006 ==
=== April ===
==== Thursday, April 27, 2006 ====
The construction of One World Trade Center commences.

=== May ===
==== Tuesday, May 23, 2006 ====
The new 7 World Trade Center opens in New York City.

=== September ===
==== Monday, September 11, 2006 ====
Between the hours of 8:30 a.m. and midnight on September 11, 2006, on CNN, viewers could watch CNN footage of the attacks, as it happened as it was broadcast on that day. At 8:49 a.m. ET, during American Morning, CNN rebroadcast the first minute of its coverage, as it was the moment it broke the news.

MSNBC broadcasts national NBC News coverage from 8:52 to 12:00 ET, branding it as a "Living History Event". They would do it again annually since then.

== 2007 ==
=== Tuesday, September 11, 2007 ===
Ceremonies are held across the United States to mark the sixth anniversary of the September 11 attacks. In New York City, the main commemoration is held at Zuccotti Park because the World Trade Center site is undergoing reconstruction. Relatives of victims are permitted to enter the site to lay flowers and pay their respects. The names of those killed in the attacks are read aloud, with moments of silence observed at the times the aircraft struck the World Trade Center and when the towers collapsed.

== 2008 ==
=== Monday, February 11, 2008 ===
The United States announces charges for Khalid Sheikh Mohammed and four other conspirators, and that it will seek the death penalty in the case.

=== Sunday, April 20, 2008 ===
Pope Benedict XVI makes a visit to the World Trade Center site during his visit to the United States. He is the first pope to visit the site since the attacks.

=== Saturday, May 17, 2008 ===
One World Trade Center reaches ground level.

=== Thursday, September 11, 2008 ===
George W. Bush dedicates the Pentagon Memorial to the public on the occasion of the seventh anniversary of the September 11 attacks.

== 2009 ==
=== Friday, November 13, 2009 ===
U.S. Attorney General Eric Holder announces that Khalid Sheikh Mohammed's trial will be transferred from a military commission to the civilian U.S. District Court for the Southern District of New York.

== 2010 ==
=== Wednesday, June 23, 2010 ===
District Judge Alvin Hellerstein approves a $700 million settlement between the World Trade Center Captive Insurance Company and 95 percent of plaintiffs for reimbursement of 9/11 first responders exposed to toxic dust at Ground Zero.

== 2011 ==
=== Sunday, January 2, 2011 ===
President Barack Obama signs the James Zadroga 9/11 Health and Compensation Act creating the World Trade Center Health Program for 9/11 victims.

=== Tuesday, April 5, 2011 ===
Attorney General Holder transfers the KSM trial back to military jurisdiction.

=== Monday, May 2, 2011 ===
Osama bin Laden, the founder of the terrorist organization al-Qaeda who was responsible for the September 11 attacks, is killed by U.S. Navy SEALs in Abbottabad, Pakistan. The death of bin Laden is announced by the President of the United States Barack Obama in a nationwide address.

=== Sunday, September 11, 2011 ===
Ceremonies are held across the United States and the world to mark the tenth anniversary of the attacks. The National September 11 Memorial at the World Trade Center site is dedicated in a ceremony attended by President Obama, former President Bush, their respective First Ladies, and several federal, state, and local government officials. One day earlier, the Flight 93 National Memorial in Shanksville, Pennsylvania was inaugurated in a ceremony attended by Vice President Joe Biden.

The NFL also saw its first Sunday set of games be scheduled for the first time following the attacks. There was initial speculation that both New York based teams would play against each other, as they were scheduled to play that season. Instead, the New York Giants visited the Washington Redskins as the marquee matchup that Sunday. Meanwhile, the Dallas Cowboys visited the New York Jets later that night. Moments of silence were held before each game’s kickoff.

== 2012 ==
=== Saturday, May 5, 2012 ===
Khalid Sheikh Mohammed and five other alleged conspirators of the September 11 attacks are arraigned by a U.S. military court presided by Colonel James L. Pohl.

=== Thursday, August 30, 2012 ===
Construction of 1 World Trade Center's main structure tops out at 104 floors.

=== Wednesday, December 19, 2012 ===
The Journal of the American Medical Association publishes an article indicating an increased risk of cancer from exposure to the 9/11 attacks.

== 2013 ==
=== Friday, May 10, 2013 ===
Construction of the new One World Trade Center is completed with the installation of the spire at 1,776 feet, making it the tallest building in both the United States and the Western Hemisphere.

=== Wednesday, November 13, 2013 ===
The new 4 World Trade Center opens.

== 2014 ==
=== May ===
==== Friday, May 2, 2014 ====
The U.S. Court of Appeals for the Second Circuit rules in a lawsuit from Cedar & Washington Associates that American Airlines Group Inc., United Continental Holdings, the Port Authority of New York & New Jersey, and Larry Silverstein are exempt from having to pay for environmental damage from 9/11 under the Comprehensive Environmental Response, Compensation, and Liability Act of 1980 since the attacks were an act of war.

==== Thursday, May 15, 2014 ====
The museum at the National September 11 Memorial at the World Trade Center site, which includes a repository for unidentified remains from the attacks, is inaugurated during a private ceremony with victims' families and friends. The facility is opened to the public six days later.

=== November ===
==== Monday, November 3, 2014 ====
One World Trade Center formally opens to new tenants with Condé Nast moving in.

=== December ===
==== Thursday, December 4, 2014 ====
The U.S. Supreme Court rejects Cedar & Washington's appeal in its lawsuit.

== 2015 ==
=== Thursday, September 10, 2015 ===
The Flight 93 National Memorial in Somerset County, Pennsylvania, opens its new visitor center, providing exhibits and information about United Airlines Flight 93 and the passengers and crew who died during the September 11 attacks.

== 2016 ==
=== March ===
==== Thursday, March 3, 2016 ====
The World Trade Center Transportation Hub opens.

=== June ===
==== Friday, June 10, 2016 ====
Liberty Park opens at the World Trade Center site.

=== July ===
==== Friday, July 15, 2016 ====
The U.S. federal government declassifies the redacted "28 pages" of the Joint Inquiry into Intelligence Community Activities before and after the Terrorist Attacks of September 11, 2001 revealing that al-Qaeda was assisted by individuals affiliated with the Saudi government.

=== September ===
==== Sunday, September 11, 2016 ====
Ceremonies are held across the United States and the world to mark the 15th anniversary of the attacks, including a vigil at the World Trade Center site attended by both major candidates of the 2016 United States presidential election, Donald Trump and Hillary Clinton.

Once again, the NFL hosted its first Sunday set of games on the 11th. The Cincinnati Bengals visited the New York Jets early in the day. Meanwhile, most of the nation saw New York Giants visit the Dallas Cowboys. The Pittsburgh Steelers visited the Washington Redskins the following night in front of a prime-time audience.

==== Wednesday, September 28, 2016 ====
Congress passes the Justice Against Sponsors of Terrorism Act, overturning President Barack Obama's veto for the only time in his presidency, allowing victims of the September 11 attacks to sue the Government of Saudi Arabia for the attacks.

== 2017 ==
=== Tuesday, May 30, 2017 ===
A ceremony is held at the National September 11 Memorial & Museum to mark the 15th anniversary of the completion of the rescue and recovery operations at Ground Zero. The ceremony honors the first responders, rescue and recovery workers, survivors, and others who participated in the nine-month recovery operation, during which approximately 1.8 million tons of material were removed from the World Trade Center site. A planned permanent tribute to rescue and recovery workers and those suffering from 9/11-related illnesses is also announced.

== 2018 ==
=== Monday, June 11, 2018 ===
The new 3 World Trade Center opens.

=== Saturday, September 8, 2018 ===
The WTC Cortlandt station destroyed in the attacks is reopened after reconstruction is completed.

== 2019 ==
=== Monday, July 29, 2019 ===
President Donald Trump signs the Never Forget the Heroes Act permanently authorizing the September 11th Victim Compensation Fund.

=== Friday, August 30, 2019 ===
The United States v. Khalid Sheikh Mohammed trial is scheduled for January 11, 2021.

== 2020 ==
=== Friday, December 18, 2020 ===
After being repeatedly delayed because of the COVID-19 pandemic, a judge indefinitely postpones the U.S. vs. KSM trial.

== 2021 ==
=== September ===
==== Friday, September 10, 2021 ====
After numerous delays, St. Nicholas Greek Orthodox Church is partially reopened and illuminated for an outdoor memorial service ahead of 20th anniversary commemorations the follow day.

==== Saturday, September 11, 2021 ====
Ceremonies are held across the United States and the world to commemorate the 20th anniversary of the attacks. President Joe Biden, First Lady Jill Biden, former presidents Bill Clinton and Barack Obama accompanied with their respective spouses, and several federal, state, local officials attend a remembrance ceremony at the National September 11 Memorial & Museum in New York. Vice President Kamala Harris and former president George W. Bush speak at a memorial service held the Flight 93 National Memorial in Somerset County, Pennsylvania. Secretary of Defense Lloyd Austin and Chairman of the Joint Chiefs of Staff Mark Milley also preside over a memorial service at the Pentagon Memorial, which was held concurrently with the aforementioned events.

== 2022 ==
=== Sunday, July 31, 2022 ===
The second emir of Al-Qaeda, Ayman al-Zawahiri, who helped plan the September 11 attacks, is killed in a drone strike at his home in Kabul, Afghanistan. President Biden announces al-Zawahiri's death in a statement the day after on August 1.

=== Tuesday, December 6, 2022 ===
St. Nicholas Greek Orthodox Church is fully opened for regular services on December 6, 2022, the Feast of Saint Nicholas.

== 2023 ==
=== Wednesday, September 13, 2023 ===
The Ronald O. Perelman Performing Arts Center opens at the World Trade Center.

== 2024 ==
=== Friday, August 2, 2024 ===
In United States v. Khalid Sheikh Mohammed, Secretary of Defense Lloyd Austin revokes a plea deal with three men who are accused of plotting the September 11 attacks, effectively reinstating it as a death penalty case.

=== Monday, August 12, 2024 ===
Joseph W. Pfeifer retires from the FDNY when Robert S. Tucker was appointed by Mayor Eric Adams.

== 2025 ==
=== Friday, July 11, 2025 ===
The United States Court of Appeals for the District of Columbia Circuit rules that former Secretary of Defense Lloyd Austin had the authority to revoke plea agreements reached with Khalid Sheikh Mohammed, Walid bin Attash, and Mustafa al-Hawsawi, three men accused of plotting the September 11 attacks. The ruling overturns earlier military court decisions that had upheld the agreements and allows prosecutors to continue seeking the death penalty in the case.

== 2026 ==
=== Wednesday, February 25, 2026 ===
American Express announces plans to build its new global headquarters at 2 World Trade Center, becoming the building's anchor tenant and owner. The 55-story tower, designed by Foster + Partners, is planned to contain nearly 2 million square feet of office space and will be the final commercial office tower in the redevelopment of the World Trade Center site.

=== Thursday, July 9, 2026 ===
A groundbreaking ceremony is held for 2 World Trade Center at the World Trade Center site. Developed by Silverstein Properties and designed by Foster + Partners, the 55-story, 1,226-foot tower will become the new global headquarters of American Express and is expected to be completed in 2031. It is the final commercial office tower planned for the World Trade Center campus and occupies part of the site of the original World Trade Center complex destroyed in the September 11 attacks.

=== Friday, September 11, 2026 ===
The United States marks the 25th anniversary of the September 11, 2001 attacks. At the 9/11 Memorial in Lower Manhattan, family members of victims gather for the annual commemoration ceremony and read aloud the names of those killed in the 2001 attacks and the 1993 World Trade Center bombing. The ceremony includes seven moments of silence marking the attacks and the collapses of the World Trade Center towers, the attack on the Pentagon, the crash of United Airlines Flight 93, and, for the first time, those who later died from 9/11-related illnesses and injuries.

President Donald Trump and First Lady Melania Trump attend a remembrance ceremony at the Pentagon honoring the 184 people killed there in the September 11 attacks, while Vice President JD Vance and former presidents attend the commemoration in New York City.

The Central Intelligence Agency marks the 25th anniversary with a retrospective on its response to the September 11 attacks and its counterterrorism efforts in the years that followed.

At the night before, in Lower Manhattan, 2,977 drones flew in the air, forming the shape of the original World Trade Center, making a light show, during the Tribute in Light.

== 2031 ==
The new 2 World Trade Center is scheduled to be completed.
