= Alleged Saudi role in the September 11 attacks =

Since the September 11 attacks in the United States in 2001, allegations of Saudi government involvement in the attacks have been made, with Saudi Arabia regularly denying such claims.

The 9/11 Commission Report, issued by the 9/11 Commission on July 22, 2004, "found no evidence that the Saudi government as an institution or senior Saudi officials individually funded Al-Qaeda" to conspire in the attacks, or that it funded the attackers; however, according to the BBC, the report identified Saudi Arabia as the primary funding location for Al-Qaeda, and that 15 of the 19 hijackers were Saudi citizens.

In 2012, the FBI stated that it had evidence that Saudi diplomat Fahad al-Thumairy, a Saudi Ministry of Islamic Affairs official and radical cleric who served at the King Fahd Mosque in Los Angeles, and Omar al-Bayoumi (OAB), a suspected Saudi government agent, had supported the 9/11 hijackers. In 2021, the FBI stated that Omar al-Bayoumi was a Saudi intelligence agent with ties to 9/11 hijackers Nawaf al-Hazmi and Khalid al-Mihdhar when they initially entered into the US. In 2022, the FBI stated that "there is a 50/50 chance al-Bayoumi had advanced knowledge the 9/11 attacks were to occur". Al-Bayoumi also helped the hijackers find housing in San Diego. Al-Bayoumi stated that he simply befriended the hijackers and also denied being a Saudi government agent. The Saudi government also denied that Al-Bayoumi was an agent.

The Saudi government had broad immunity from lawsuits in the US under the Foreign Sovereign Immunity Act until it was amended in 2016 by the Justice Against Sponsors of Terrorism Act (JASTA). In 2018 a federal judge ruled that a lawsuit brought forward by survivors of, and the families of victims of, the 9/11 attacks, had "a reasonable basis" under JASTA and allowed it to move forward.

== Alleged evidence ==
=== Origin of the perpetrators ===
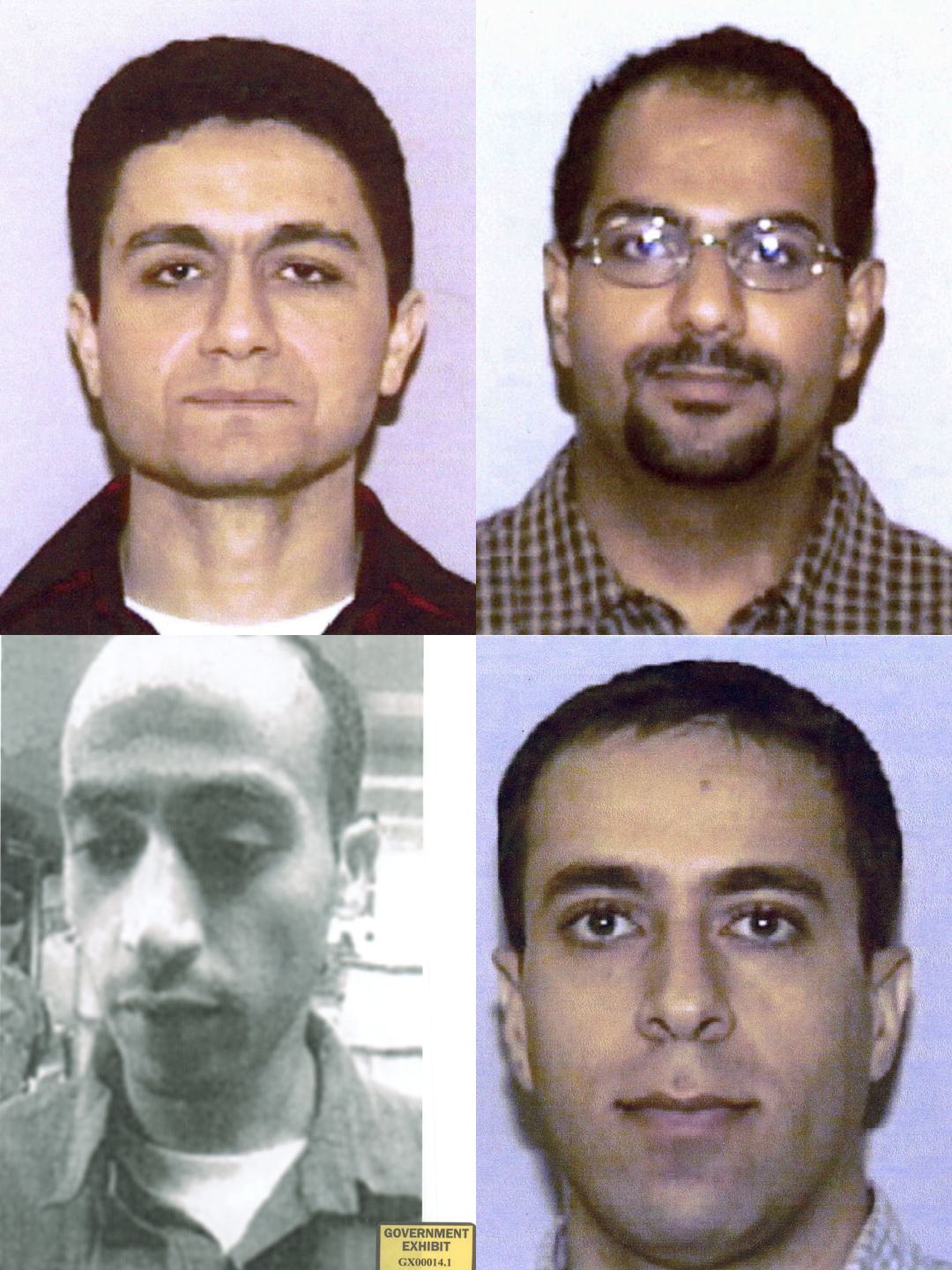
The four lead hijackers of the September 11 attacks, Mohamed Atta, Marwan al-Shehhi, Hani Hanjour, and Ziad Jarrah

Origins of the 19 hijackers
Nationality	Number
Saudi Arabia	15
United Arab Emirates	2
Egypt	1
Lebanon	1

In the attacks of September 11, 2001, four hijacked commercial airliners were used to attack targets in New York and Washington, D.C. The 19 hijackers belonged to the terrorist network Al-Qaeda and came from four countries: 15 of them were Saudi citizens. In addition, there were two from the United Arab Emirates and one each from Egypt and Lebanon. This striking concentration of Saudi origins – as well as the Saudi nationality of al-Qaeda leader Osama bin Laden – early on raised suspicions of possible links to Saudi Arabia. Most of the Saudi attackers came from conservative Islamic regions of Saudi Arabia and some had been socialized in radical religious circles. Saudi Arabia, a close ally of the US, came under political pressure to distance itself from the perpetrators and al-Qaeda. Official representatives of Saudi Arabia repeatedly emphasized that they had neither known about nor supported the attack plans and categorically rejected any responsibility.

=== Links between the Saudi royal family and the Saudi intelligence service to the hijackers ===
After the attacks, suspicions arose about contacts between the 9/11 perpetrators and members of the Saudi government. Much of this evidence focuses on two Saudi citizens in the US: Omar al-Bayoumi and Fahad al-Thumairy. Al-Thumairy was a diplomatic employee at the Saudi Arabian Consulate General in Los Angeles (and also imam of the King Fahd Mosque in Culver City), and al-Bayoumi was considered a well-connected member of the Saudi community in California. Both met the first two hijackers after they arrived in California in early 2000, Nawaf al-Hazmi and Khalid al-Mihdhar, helped them find apartments in San Diego, and provided them with support. Al-Bayoumi paid the first two months' rent for the two men and helped them set up bank accounts. Subsequent FBI investigations revealed that al-Bayoumi was in close contact with Saudi government agencies: the telephone numbers of employees of the Saudi embassy who worked in the Islamic affairs office were found in his apartment. Phone records also show dozens of calls made by al-Bayoumi to the Saudi consulate in Los Angeles, the embassy in Washington, D.C., and the Saudi cultural mission during the period when he was assisting the attackers. Al-Thumairy, in turn, was suspected of providing behind-the-scenes support to Hazmi and Mihdhar; according to FBI documents, a high-ranking Saudi embassy employee in Washington, Musaed al-Jarrah, (code name “MAJ”) allegedly tasked the two with supporting the 9/11 perpetrators.

There is much to suggest that al-Bayoumi was operating as a Saudi agent. It was not until 20 years after the attacks – through the release of previously classified FBI documents – that the US federal police confirmed internally that al-Bayoumi was working for the Saudi secret service (General Intelligence Presidency, GIP). From 1998 to 2001, as a “contact person” for the Saudi intelligence services, he received a monthly salary paid through a Saudi government agency or front company and the embassy in Washington (under Ambassador Prince Bandar bin Sultan Al Saud). Al-Bayoumi provided the Saudi ambassador with reports on Saudi “persons of interest” in Los Angeles and San Diego, which were then forwarded to the intelligence service in Riyadh. FBI findings also indicate that al-Bayoumi met with a Saudi consulate employee shortly before his first meeting with Hazmi and Mihdhar and was seen with Thumairy at the mosque immediately after the meeting. In the months that followed, al-Bayoumi regularly spoke on the phone with Thumairy – including during the very period when he was helping the two future attackers move into San Diego – and was also in contact with Anwar al-Awlaki, a Yemeni-American imam in San Diego who later became known as an al-Qaeda terrorist himself.

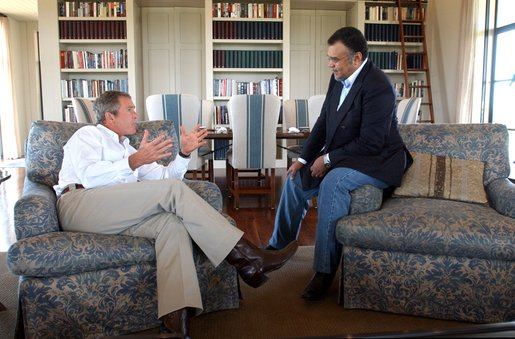
Prince Bandar bin Sultan with G.W. Bush (2002)

Connections to the Saudi leadership arose primarily through the long-time Saudi ambassador to the US, Prince Bandar bin Sultan, and his wife, Princess Haifa. The US congressional document “File 17” (published in 2016) lists over three dozen names – including Bandar, Haifa, Thumairy, Bayoumi, and Osama Bassnan – and identifies numerous personal links between Saudi Arabia and the 9/11 attackers. Bandar himself came under scrutiny when it became known that at least $15,000 had been transferred directly from his personal bank account in Washington to the family of a Saudi in California. This Saudi was Omar al-Bayoumi – the “contact man” for the hijackers suspected by the FBI – or someone close to him. Meanwhile, the ambassador's wife, Haifa, was suspected of indirectly financing the attackers' accommodation. Between 1999 and 2002, Princess Haifa transferred around $74,000 in monthly checks to the California-based wife of Osama Bassnan, an acquaintance of al-Bayoumi. Bassnan and al-Bayoumi lived on the same street in San Diego and were friends; Bassnan had submitted a request for assistance to the ambassadorial couple in 1998, claiming that his wife (Majeda Dweikat) needed expensive thyroid surgery. Haifa initially approved a one-time payment of $15,000 and, shortly thereafter, ongoing monthly assistance of $2,000 to Bassnan's family. Bassnan passed on a significant portion of these checks to third parties, including Manal Bajadr, the wife of Omar al-Bayoumi. In addition, al-Bayoumi himself paid Hazmi and Mihdhar's living expenses at times, which was allegedly “offset” later by cash payments.

Both Princess Haifa and Prince Bandar denied ever knowingly funneling money to terrorists. A spokesperson for the embassy emphasized that Haifa's payments were purely humanitarian and that “the claim that the princess supported terrorism is simply false and irresponsible.” A subsequent review by the 9/11 Commission also found “no evidence” that Haifa's funds flowed directly or indirectly into the attack plans. Regardless, observers see the transactions of the ambassadorial couple and Bandar's proximity to al-Bayoumi (who reported to Bandar as an informant) as evidence that at least parts of the Saudi elite had connections to the attackers. For example, the phone book of al-Qaeda member Abu Zubaydah, who was arrested in March 2002, contained the secret phone number of a company in Colorado that managed Prince Bandar's country estate, as well as the number of one of Bandar's employees (a bodyguard at the embassy). These findings were interpreted as a possible indirect “link” between al-Qaeda and the Saudi royal family, which the latter denied.

Ten days before the attacks, Turki ibn Faisal unexpectedly resigned as head of the Saudi secret service GIP, a position he had held since 1979. Prince Turki's resignation came as a surprise, as his term of office had only been extended for another four years in May 2001. The New York Times later wrote: “The timing of Turki's dismissal – August 31 – and his links to the Taliban raise the question: Did the Saudi regime know that Bin Laden was planning an attack on the US?” In 2005, Prince Turki succeeded Bandar bin Sultan as Saudi ambassador in Washington.

=== Financing of Al-Qaeda ===
Financial flows played a central role in the analysis of possible Saudi involvement. Before 2001, al-Qaeda was largely financed by donations from private donors in the Middle East, particularly Saudi Arabia. The 9/11 Commission found that wealthy Saudi individuals and Islamic charities had provided a "highly fertile ground for fundraising" for al-Qaeda for years. Financing was often indirect: donations to formally charitable foundations with Saudi state involvement were partly diverted into channels that ultimately benefited al-Qaeda. At the same time, names of alleged Saudi financial backers of al-Qaeda were circulating: the so-called "Golden Chain" includes the names of wealthy individuals – mostly from Saudi Arabia or other Gulf states – who are said to have provided financial support to Bin Laden. Among them are suspected members of the extensive Bin Laden family and Saudi Arabian businessmen. Zacarias Moussaoui, who was convicted of terrorism, testified under oath that members of the royal family, including Bandar bin Sultan, had donated money to al-Qaeda and contributed to the financing of the September 11 attacks. Official Saudi Arabian sources, however, insisted that they had stopped all known donations to al-Qaeda after 1993 and, especially after 9/11, reformed or closed numerous aid organizations in order to prevent terrorist financing.

=== Role of the Bin Laden family ===
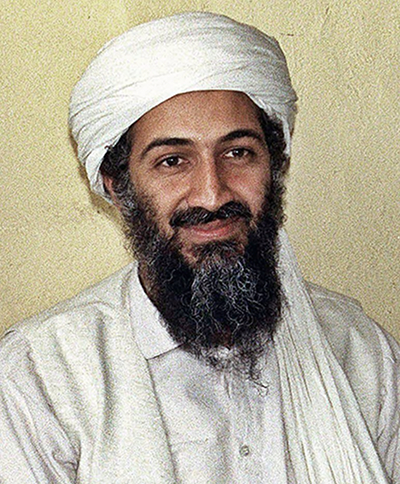
Osama bin Laden (1997)

The Bin Laden family (one of Saudi Arabia's richest business families) played a special role in the public debate after 9/11. Osama bin Laden came from this widely ramified family, which controls an international construction empire (the Saudi Binladin Group) and traditionally maintains close ties to the Saudi ruling family. Saudi Arabia had already revoked Osama's citizenship in 1994, and the family officially distanced itself from him. Nevertheless, the treatment of Bin Laden's relatives living in the US after the attacks sparked criticism. Immediately after 9/11, the Saudi embassy received permission to remove dozens of Saudi citizens – including around two dozen members of the Bin Laden family – from the country. Between September 14 and 24, 2001, a total of nine charter flights took place within the US and to Saudi Arabia, evacuating approximately 160 Saudis. A flight on September 20 picked up 26 people across the country, 22 of whom were close relatives of Osama bin Laden. This special treatment during the general flight ban in effect at the time sparked speculation that the US government may have given preferential treatment to the Saudis. Films such as Fahrenheit 9/11 (2004) and books such as House of Bush, House of Saud accused the FBI and the Bush administration of putting Saudi interests above the investigation.

The 9/11 Commission investigated these allegations in detail and concluded that there was no misconduct on the part of the authorities during the departures. According to the final report, no Saudi flights took off before the general flight ban was lifted on September 13, and the approvals were granted bureaucratically (by counterterrorism official Richard Clarke) rather than through political intervention from above. The FBI thoroughly interrogated most of the Saudi passengers before their departure – 22 of the 26 Bin Laden relatives on the September 20 flight were questioned, with "many detailed questions" being asked. Investigators found no evidence that any of the Saudis who left the country had prior knowledge or involvement in the attacks. On the contrary, the commission noted that grouping the Saudi witnesses on a few flights had actually been beneficial to the FBI's questioning—if they had been allowed to leave individually on regular routes, many would not have been interviewed at all. Critics remained skeptical, however, arguing that it was unclear how intensive the questioning really was and whether all relevant individuals had been interviewed. Even during the flight ban on September 13, three Saudis were flown out, which the US government initially denied, but the airline admitted this in June 2004.

In addition, the fact that the wealthy Bin Laden dynasty had good business connections in the US (including investments in US companies) fueled conspiracy theories about alleged backroom deals. For example, Osama bin Laden's brother, Shafiq bin Laden, met with George H. W. Bush, the father of President George W. Bush, at an investor meeting of the Carlyle Group on the morning of September 11.

=== Further evidence ===
Beyond the aspects mentioned above, further evidence has come to light over time that raises questions about Saudi links to 9/11. For example, investigative research in Florida revealed that a wealthy Saudi family with ties to the royal family had been living in Sarasota until August 2001, immediately before the attacks, and then left the country in a hurry. The family of Abdul Aziz and Anoud al-Hijji left their house, cars, and belongings (including family jewels) behind and returned to Saudi Arabia. Later FBI investigations (which only became known years later) revealed that several 9/11 attackers had visited the family's secluded residential area while they were living there. In particular, hijackers Mohamed Atta, Marwan al-Shehhi, and Ziad Jarrah, who were training to fly in Venice, Florida, are said to have entered and left the al-Hijji residence in the gated community of "Prestancia" in Sarasota. The FBI also linked the family's sudden disappearance to another bizarre discovery: in October 2001, a Tunisian man was arrested nearby after throwing Islamist propaganda material, an airport map, and a will into a trash container—this man was linked to the missing family. Curiously, none of these findings made it into the final report of the 9/11 Commission. It was only after inquiries from journalists and pressure from former Senator Bob Graham that the Sarasota information was released years later. However, the FBI emphasized that no relevant connections to the attacks had been found in Sarasota – which in turn is doubted by critics who speak of a cover-up.

Another piece of evidence in the debate is a suspected "dry run" two years before 9/11: In November 1999, two Saudi citizens – students Ahmed al-Qudhaeein and Hamad al-Shalawi – caused an incident on an American Airlines domestic flight by repeatedly attempting to enter the cockpit. Their conspicuous behavior led to an unscheduled landing in Ohio and questioning by the FBI. The two were released due to lack of concrete evidence. However, in the course of a lawsuit filed against Saudi Arabia by surviving relatives in 2017, it emerged that, according to FBI files, these men had links to al-Qaeda and were supported by the Saudi state apparatus. According to the lawsuit, which cites FBI investigations, Qudhaeein and Shalawi were deliberately sent to the US in 1999 with funding from the Saudi embassy in Washington to scout out security on civilian aircraft. Both had trained in Afghanistan at the same time as the perpetrators of the 9/11 attacks, learning how to use weapons and explosives, and had "worked for the Saudi Arabian government," one of them even in the Ministry of Islamic Affairs.

Finally, several new revelations from FBI files attracted attention in 2020–2022. In 2020, an oversight revealed the name of the mysterious Saudi mastermind known as "MAJ": Mussaed Ahmed al-Jarrah, a diplomat with the rank of embassy secretary who worked at the Saudi embassy in Washington from 1999 to 2000. Al-Jarrah reported to Ambassador Prince Bandar and coordinated Islamic affairs, including the deployment and supervision of Saudi religious officials in the US. According to the FBI, investigators suspect that Jarrah was the one who instructed Thumairy and al-Bayoumi in Los Angeles to take care of Hazmi and Mihdhar. This connection—a possible channel of command from the embassy to the attackers' helpers—had long been blacked out in public reports and reinforced suspicions that at least some individuals from the middle ranks of the Saudi bureaucracy had been involved in the preparations for 9/11.

== Investigations and reports ==
=== 2004 – 9/11 Commission Report ===
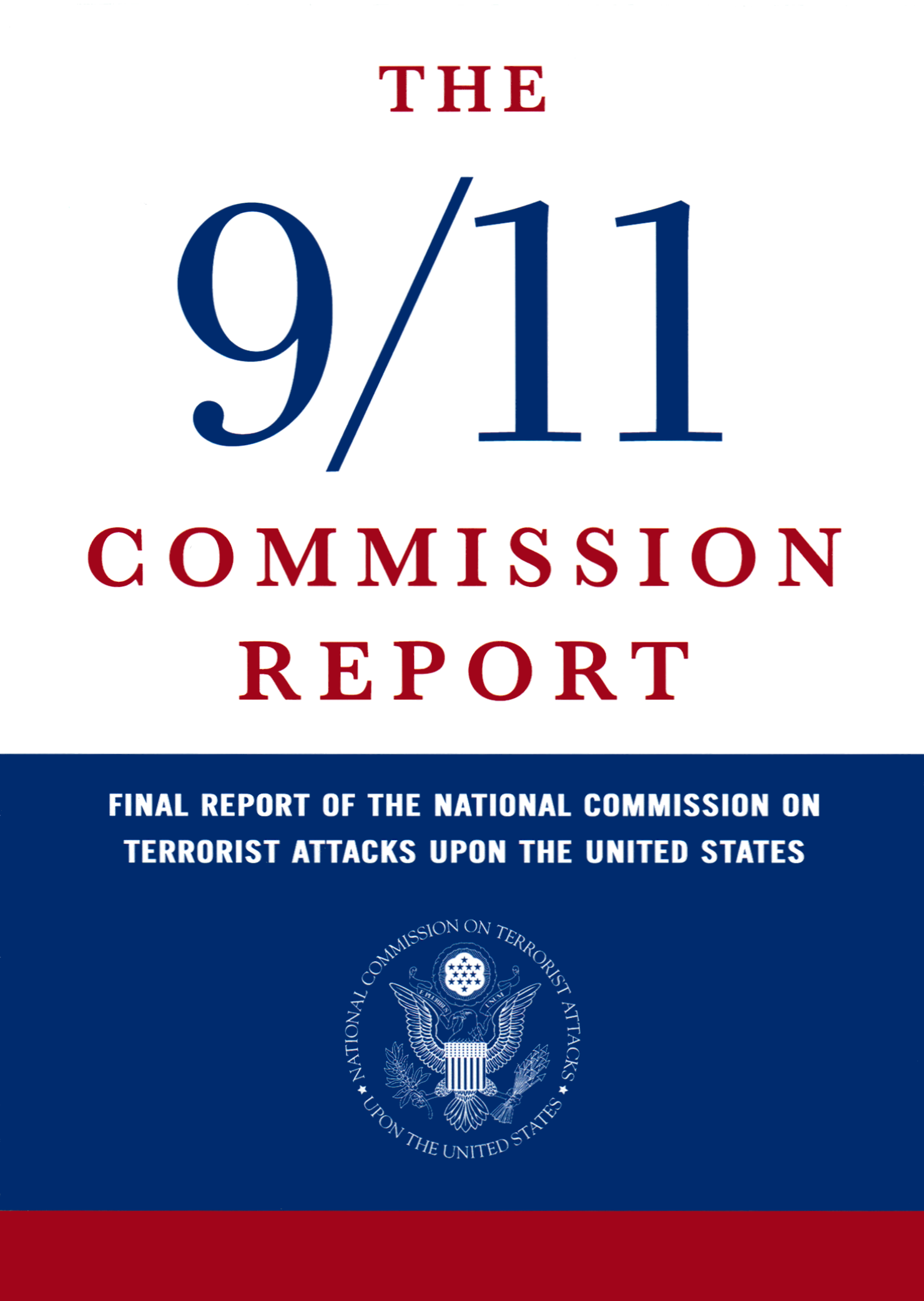
9/11 Commission Report cover

The 9/11 Commission's final report, the 9/11 Commission Report, published in July 2004 at the request of Bush administration and the U.S Congress, concluded that there was "no evidence" linking Saudi Arabian government or its senior officials to the September 11 attacks.

The Commission noted the presence of numerous private donors and sources of fundraising in Saudi Arabia and other Gulf States for Al-Qaeda before 9/11.

=== April 2016 – The 28 pages ===
The alleged Saudi role in the September 11 attacks gained new attention after Bob Graham and Porter Goss, former U.S. congressmen and co-chairmen of the congressional inquiry into the attacks, told CBS in April 2016 that the redacted 28 pages of the congressional inquiry's report refer to evidence of Saudi Arabia's substantial involvement in the execution of the attacks, and calls renewed to have the redacted pages released.

The panel's findings 'did not discover' any role by 'senior, high-level' Saudi government officials, but the "commission's narrow wording", according to critics, suggests the possibility that "less senior officials or parts of the Saudi government could have played a role". Florida Democratic Senator Bob Graham, who chaired the United States Senate Select Committee on Intelligence at the time of the report said in his sworn statements that "there was evidence of support from the Saudi government for the terrorists."

In 2017 a New York lawyer, Jim Kreindler, said that he had found "a link between Saudi officials and the hijackers."

=== July 2016 – File 17 ===
In July 2016, the U.S. government released a document, compiled by Dana Lesemann and Michael Jacobson, known as "File 17", which contains a list naming three dozen people, including Fahad al-Thumairy, Omar al-Bayoumi, Osama Bassnan, and Mohdhar Abdullah, which connects Saudi Arabia to the hijackers. According to the former Democratic US Senator Bob Graham, "Much of the information upon which File 17 was written was based on what's in the 28 pages."

=== 2017 'dry-run' lawsuit ===
According to the New York Post in 2017, the Saudi embassy in Washington DC was accused of performing a "dry run" by paying two Saudi nationals, al-Qudhaeein and Hamdan al-Shalawi, "living undercover in the US as students, to fly from Phoenix to Washington," two years before the attacks. According to journalist Rachael Revesz, "evidence submitted" to a lawsuit against the Saudi government claimed that the Saudi embassy in Washington DC may have funded flights to these students in 1999 to research about the flight deck security. Specifically, the suit, citing the FBI documents, alleges the Saudi government funded two individuals who asked flight attendants technical questions and tried to enter the cockpit of a domestic flight in the US, which caused the flight to make an emergency landing in Ohio and the individuals to be interrogated by the FBI. The two individuals were later released after initial interrogation by the FBI. Mentioning FBI documents, the complaint alleged that the students were part of a network of Saudi Arabian agents in the US, and "participated in the terrorist conspiracy". The documents stated that Qudhaeein and Shalawi were trained in Afghanistan at the same time with some other al-Qaeda operatives that participated in the 9/11 attacks and that "both worked for and received money from the Saudi government, with Qudhaeein employed at the Ministry of Islamic Affairs."

=== 2020 FBI file release ===
In April 2020, the FBI neglected to redact one of the several instances of the Saudi diplomat name, Mussaed Ahmed al-Jarrah (MAJ), in a court filing in the lawsuit brought by 9/11 families. Over the course of 1999–2000 MAJ was a mid-level Saudi Foreign Ministry official who was working in the Saudi Embassy in Washington, DC. Former embassy officials said MAJ reported to the Saudi ambassador to the U.S., Prince Bandar, and managed employees of the Ministry of Islamic Affairs at Saudi-funded mosques and Islamic centers.

The October 2012 FBI update to the FBI's own investigation of possible Saudi involvement in the 9/11 attacks stated that FBI agents had uncovered evidence that Saudi diplomat Fahad al-Thumairy, a Saudi Ministry of Islamic Affairs official and radical cleric who served as the imam of the King Fahd Mosque in Los Angeles, and Omar al-Bayoumi (OAB) a suspected Saudi government agent, had been tasked to support the 9/11 hijackers by another individual; referred to as MAJ, whose name was redacted in the October 2012 update document in all but one instance. FBI agents suspected that MAJ had directed crucial support towards two of 9/11 hijackers; Khalid al-Mihdhar and Nawaf al-Hazmi, who participated on 9/11 in the hijacking of American Airlines Flight 77. After Khalid al-Mihdhar and Nawaf al-Hazmi arrived in Los Angeles on January 15, 2000; FBI agents suspected that they were allegedly assisted by Saudi diplomat Fahad al-Thumairy and by OAB, with OAB finding them an apartment, lending them money and setting them up with bank accounts. According to a sworn statement from former LA-based FBI agent Catherine Hunt; during the investigation by the 9/11 Commission the FBI believed that MAJ was engaged in supporting and maintaining al-Thumairy.

On September 11, 2020, US Magistrate Judge Sarah Netburn ordered two members of the Saudi royal family, including Prince Bandar bin Sultan, to answer questions raised by the 9/11 lawsuit. The victims have called it a turning point in a long-running lawsuit. Relatives of the September 11 attack victims claim that the agents of Saudi Arabia knowingly supported al-Qaeda and its leader Osama bin Laden, before hijacking and crashing the planes into New York's World Trade Center Twin Towers.

=== 2021 FBI file release ===
On September 11, 2021, following an executive order by Joe Biden, the FBI started releasing a series of redacted documents which were related to alleged links of Saudi officials to 9/11 attacks, over a period of six months.

The first of these documents, a 16-page FBI report dated to 2016, is heavily redacted. The document found no evidence linking the Saudi government to the September 11 attacks. The document asserted that Omar al-Bayoumi was a frequent visitor to the Saudi Consulate in Los Angeles who had provided "significant logistical support" and financial assistance to 9/11 hijackers Nawaf al-Hazmi and Khalid al-Mihdhar upon their arrival in the US.

Welcoming the release of the document, the Saudi Embassy in Washington DC issued a statement: "No evidence has ever emerged to indicate that the Saudi government or its officials had previous knowledge of the terrorist attack or were in any way involved in its planning or execution... Any allegation that Saudi Arabia is complicit in the September 11 attacks is categorically false".

=== 2022 FBI file release ===
The United States Justice Department admitted on March 10 that it would miss a deadline specified by President Joe Biden's executive order to examine and reveal records from the FBI's investigation into the attack.

In March 2022, the FBI declassified a 510-page report about 9/11 that it produced in 2017. The report found that "there is a 50/50 chance al-Bayoumi had advanced knowledge the 9/11 attacks were to occur," from the two Islamists he befriended that were involved in plotting 9/11. Al-Bayoumi also helped the Islamists find housing in San Diego. In response, 9/11 Commission chairman and former New Jersey governor Tom Kean said that "If that's true I'd be upset by it", adding, "The FBI said it wasn't withholding anything and we believed them."

Al-Bayoumi stated that he didn't know anything about the hijackers' plans and just befriended them after randomly meeting them. Saudi Arabia stated that al-Bayoumi was not an agent of theirs.

== Aftermath ==
The Saudi government has long denied any connection. Relatives of victims have tried to use the courts to hold Saudi royals, banks, or charities responsible, but these efforts have been thwarted partly by the 1976 Foreign Sovereign Immunities Act. According to Gawdat Bahgat, a professor of political science, following the September 11 attacks the so-called "Saudi policy of promoting terrorism and funding hatred" faced strong criticism by several "influential policy-makers and think-tanks in Washington".

According to Caleb Hanna, the US government collaborated with Saudi Arabia in suppressing the revelation of evidence related to alleged Saudi links to the attacks, denying FOIA requests and allegedly supplying inside information to the lawyers representing the Saudis involved. Bob Graham characterised the strategy as not a 'cover up' but "aggressive deception".

=== JASTA ===
In March 2016, Saudi Arabia threatened the Obama administration to sell US$750 billion worth of American assets owned by Saudi Arabia if the Justice Against Sponsors of Terrorism Act (JASTA) designed to create an exception to the 1976 Foreign Sovereign Immunity Act was enacted, which caused fears of destabilizing the US dollar. U.S. president Barack Obama also warned against "unintended consequences", while other economic analysts believed that this action would damage the Saudi government.

In March 2018, a US judge allowed a suit to move forward against Saudi Arabia brought by 9/11 survivors and victims' families, that the government should pay billions of dollars in damages to victims. The lawsuit is still ongoing as of 2025.

=== Operation Encore ===
Operation Encore was a secret FBI investigation launched in 2007 to investigate the alleged links of Saudi officials to the September 11 hijackers. According to The New York Times, "circumstantial evidence" was uncovered but no direct links were established. Potential leads were not initially pursued and some FBI agents believe that the CIA interfered with its attempt to place two Saudis under surveillance.

== See also ==
- Saudi Arabia and state-sponsored terrorism
- Zacarias Moussaoui
