= In re Terrorist Attacks on September 11, 2001 =

American civil court case

- Docket nos.: 1:03-md-01570

In re Terrorist Attacks on September 11, 2001 is a multidistrict litigation (MDL) lawsuit that seeks redress for the victims of the September 11 terrorist attacks and their families. The suit is currently pending in the United States District Court for the Southern District of New York. It was originally filed in 2002 in the United States District Court for the District of Columbia as Burnett v. Al Baraka Banking and Investment on behalf of a group of 600 9/11 survivors and family members who called themselves the 9/11 Families United to Bankrupt Terrorism. The plaintiffs' group eventually grew to include more than 6,500 members.

The case has had so many delays that it has been compared to Jarndyce v. Jarndyce, an endless legal dispute that was the subject of the novel Bleak House by Charles Dickens. Since 2013 the case has focused mainly on alleged connections between the 9/11 attacks and the government of Saudi Arabia.

Motley Rice, a law firm that represented the plaintiffs, at one point helped to form the investigative firm Rosetta Research and Consulting in order to research links between the September 11 plot and the Saudi royal family. Rosetta became involved in operations with the Federal Bureau of Investigation and the Drug Enforcement Administration (DEA). In 2005, Rosetta helped convince Haji Bashir Noorzai, an Afghan drug lord, to come to New York, where he was quickly arrested by the DEA.

In 2016, Congress passed the Justice Against Sponsors of Terrorism Act.

In 2025, Judge George B. Daniels rejected Saudi Arabia's bid to dismiss the case.

== See also ==
- Foreign Sovereign Immunities Act
- 9/11 Commission Report
- Alleged Saudi role in the September 11 attacks
- Afghan frozen assets
