= Ministry of Islamic Affairs, Dawah and Guidance =

Government ministry of Saudi Arabia

- وزارة الشؤون الإسلامية والدعوة والإرشاد

Agency overview
- Formed: July 10, 1993; 33 years ago
- Jurisdiction: Government of Saudi Arabia
- Headquarters: Riyadh
- Minister responsible: Abdullatif Al-Sheikh
- Deputy Minister responsible: Yusuf bin Muhammad
- Website: Official Website

The Ministry of Islamic Affairs, Dawah and Guidance (Note: Arabic: وزارة الشؤون الإسلامية والدعوة والإرشاد) is a government ministry in Saudi Arabia responsible for overseeing Islamic affairs in the Kingdom. It supervises and regulates mosques across the country and manages matters related to religious guidance and dawah (preaching Islam).

== History ==
The Ministry of Islamic Affairs, Awqaf, Dawah and Guidance was established by royal decree on 10 July 1993 during the reign of King Fahd. It was created to centralize the supervision of Islamic affairs and religious endowments (awqaf) under a single administrative body, consolidating responsibilities previously overseen by the Ministry of Hajj and Endowments.

In the years following its establishment, the ministry's organizational structure was revised to separate the administration of religious endowments (awqaf) from its religious and outreach functions. This restructuring led to the creation of the General Authority for Awqaf as an independent entity responsible for managing endowments (awqaf). In 2016, after the transfer of endowment (awqaf) responsibilities, the ministry's name was changed to the Ministry of Islamic Affairs, Dawah and Guidance.

=== Overseas activities ===
The ministry was alleged to have been dominated in the 1990s by clerics who espoused a radical view of Sunni Islam and exported it around the world. It spent hundreds of millions of dollars worldwide building mosques, and sent dozens of officials to the US, some of whom oversaw a network of preachers with hard-line views. Some ministry officials had links to Omar al-Bayoumi, who is alleged to have assisted two of the hijackers in the September 11 attacks, Nawaf al-Hazmi and Khalid al-Mihdhar. The allegations are at the heart of a $1 trillion (£733bn) lawsuit brought by 9/11 families.

== List of ministers ==
| No. | Portrait | Minister | Took office | Left office | Time in office |
|---|---|---|---|---|---|
| 1 | | Abdullah Al-Turki | 9 August 1993 | 16 July 1999 | 5 years, 341 days |
| 2 | | Saleh Al al-Sheikh | 16 July 1999 | 8 December 2014 | 15 years, 145 days |
| 3 | | Suleiman bin Abdullah | 8 December 2014 | 29 January 2015 | 1 month, 21 days |
| 4 | | Saleh Al al-Sheikh | 29 January 2015 | 2 June 2018 | 3 years, 124 days |
| 5 | | Abdullatif Al al-Sheikh | 2 June 2018 | Incumbent | |

== See also ==
- Ministries of Saudi Arabia
