= George B. Daniels =

American judge (born 1953)

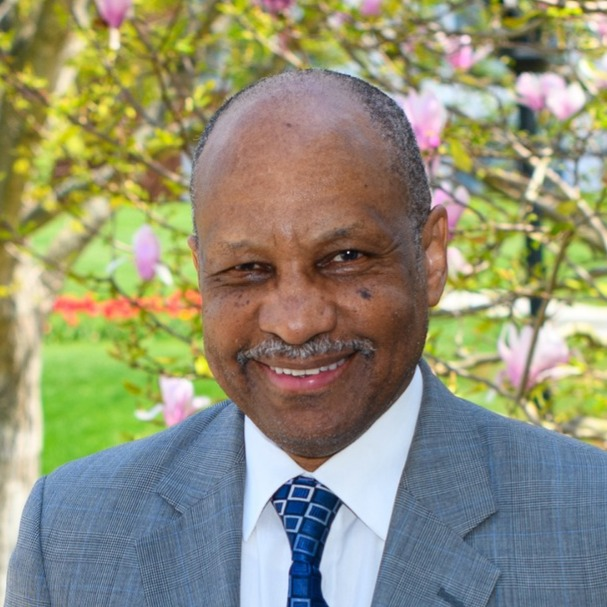

Senior Judge of the United States District Court for the Southern District of New York
- Incumbent
- Assumed office May 1, 2021

Judge of the United States District Court for the Southern District of New York
- In office March 9, 2000 – May 1, 2021
- Appointed by: Bill Clinton
- Preceded by: Robert P. Patterson Jr.
- Succeeded by: Jennifer L. Rochon

Personal details
- Born: George Benjamin Daniels Allendale, South Carolina, U.S.
- Education: Yale University (BA); University of California, Berkeley (JD)

George Benjamin Daniels (born in 1953) is a senior United States district judge of the United States District Court for the Southern District of New York.

== Early life and education ==
Daniels was born in Allendale, South Carolina. He graduated from Suffield Academy in 1971, and received a Bachelor of Arts degree from Yale University in 1975. He received a Juris Doctor from the UC Berkeley School of Law in 1978.

== Career ==
=== Early legal career ===
After law school, Daniels served as a criminal defense trial attorney for the Legal Aid Society of New York City from 1978 to 1980, representing low-income clients. He then clerked for Chief Justice Rose Bird of the California Supreme Court from 1980 to 1981. Bird was the first woman to serve as Chief Justice of California; she was later recalled by voters in 1986 largely due to her opposition to the death penalty. During this period, Daniels also worked as a part-time bar review instructor at the University of California Hastings College of the Law.

From 1981 to 1983, Daniels was a litigation associate at the New York City law firm of Skadden, Arps, Slate, Meagher & Flom.

He then served as an Assistant United States Attorney for the Eastern District of New York from 1983 to 1989, prosecuting federal criminal cases for six years. Concurrently, he was an adjunct professor of law at Brooklyn Law School from 1988 to 1991, where he taught trial advocacy.

=== New York State judicial career ===
In 1989, near the end of his third term, Mayor Ed Koch appointed Daniels a judge of the Criminal Court of the City of New York. He stepped down from the bench in 1990 to serve as Counsel to Mayor David Dinkins—the first Black mayor of New York City. The role of Counsel to the Mayor is a confidential advisory position, distinct from the Corporation Counsel, in which the officeholder serves as the mayor's personal legal adviser on policy, appointments, and politically sensitive matters. Daniels served in that capacity through 1993. Mayor Dinkins subsequently re-appointed him to the Criminal Court in 1993.

In 1995, Daniels was elected a justice of the Supreme Court of the State of New York, the state's general trial court of unlimited jurisdiction, and served until his elevation to the federal bench in 2000.

=== Federal judicial service ===
Daniels was nominated by President Bill Clinton on August 5, 1999, to a seat on the United States District Court for the Southern District of New York, vacated by Judge Robert P. Patterson, Jr. His nomination was supported by Senators Daniel Patrick Moynihan and Chuck Schumer. The Senate Judiciary Committee held a hearing on November 10, 1999, and reported his nomination favorably on November 17, 1999. He was confirmed by the United States Senate on February 24, 2000, by a unanimous 98–0 vote, and received his commission on March 9, 2000.

Daniels assumed senior status on May 1, 2021. His courtroom is in the Daniel Patrick Moynihan United States Courthouse at 500 Pearl Street in Lower Manhattan.

=== Notable cases ===
==== September 11 multi-district litigation (2003–) ====
Since 2003, Daniels has presided over MDL 1570 (In re Terrorist Attacks on September 11, 2001), a massive consolidated multi-district litigation encompassing thousands of civil lawsuits filed by victims, survivors, and their families arising from the September 11 attacks. The docket is among the most complex and long-running in the Southern District's history.

On December 15, 2011, in the Havlish group of plaintiffs, Daniels held a three-hour evidentiary hearing and issued 276 Findings of Fact and 35 Conclusions of Law, ruling that Iran, Ayatollah Khamenei, former President Rafsanjani, the Islamic Revolutionary Guard Corps, the Ministry of Intelligence and Security, and Hezbollah were liable for providing material support to al-Qaeda in connection with the September 11 attacks. The evidence included sworn videotaped testimony from three Iranian military-intelligence defectors and affidavits from ten experts, including three former 9/11 Commission staff members. He entered a default judgment awarding approximately $6 billion in damages to the families of 47 victims, including $4.69 billion in punitive damages.

On March 9, 2016, Daniels issued a further default judgment against Iran ordering it to pay $7.5 billion in compensatory damages to families of victims—$12.5 million per spouse, $8.5 million per parent, $8.5 million per child, and $4.25 million per sibling—and $3 billion to insurers such as Chubb Limited that paid claims resulting from the attacks. The plaintiffs argued that Iran had provided material support and training to al-Qaeda members, including the hijackers, through Hezbollah prior to the attacks. Earlier, in September 2015, Daniels had ruled that Saudi Arabia was entitled to sovereign immunity under the Foreign Sovereign Immunities Act and dismissed all claims against the kingdom for its alleged role in the attacks.

In 2023, Daniels entered judgments requiring both the Taliban and Iran to pay a combined $144.7 billion to more than 6,000 people injured or bereaved in the attacks—one of the largest civil judgments in United States history.

On August 28, 2025, following the enactment of the Justice Against Sponsors of Terrorism Act (JASTA), Daniels denied Saudi Arabia's renewed motion to dismiss. He ruled that plaintiffs had provided "reasonable evidence" that two Saudi government employees—Omar al-Bayoumi and Fahad al-Thumairy—were sent by the Saudi government to assist the hijackers, finding "a high probability as to Bayoumi and Thumairy's roles in the hijackers' plans, and the related role of their employer." Among the evidence credited by the court were drawings in Bayoumi's notebook that appeared to depict how a plane might strike a ground target, and a Washington surveillance video that plaintiffs argued showed Bayoumi surveilling Capitol security. The ruling allowed the lawsuit against Saudi Arabia to proceed toward trial.

==== Operation Wooden Nickel (2006–2009) ====
Between 2006 and 2009, Daniels entered orders against 36 defendants imposing more than $50 million in total restitution and civil monetary penalties in connection with a CFTC, FBI, and DOJ cooperative sting operation targeting illegal foreign currency futures fraud.

==== SEC v. Lee (2010) ====
On June 18, 2010, Daniels outlined the contours of the in pari delicto doctrine under New York law in SEC v. Lee, 720 F. Supp. 2d 305, holding that a plaintiff invoking the doctrine "must be an active, voluntary participant in the wrongful conduct" and that "the plaintiff's wrongdoing must be at least substantially equal to that of the defendant." He articulated two exceptions: the "adverse interest" exception, applying when an agent defrauds the principal exclusively for the agent's own benefit, and the "innocent insider" exception, applying when another corporate agent had the will and ability to stop the fraud.

==== JPMorgan "London Whale" securities litigation (2016) ====
Daniels presided over the shareholder class action arising from JPMorgan Chase's 2012 "London Whale" trading losses, in which the bank's Chief Investment Office lost approximately $6 billion through failed credit derivatives trades. On January 19, 2016, he approved a $150 million settlement resolving claims that JPMorgan had misled investors about its trading risk. Lead plaintiffs in the case included the Arkansas Teacher Retirement System and the Oregon State Treasurer.

==== CREW v. Trump (2017–2021) ====
On December 21, 2017, Daniels granted the government's motion to dismiss CREW v. Trump, a lawsuit filed by Citizens for Responsibility and Ethics in Washington challenging President Donald Trump's business activities under the Domestic and Foreign Emoluments Clauses of the United States Constitution, which bar the president from accepting gifts or payments from foreign governments or from the states without congressional consent. Daniels held that the plaintiffs lacked standing and wrote: "This case involves a conflict between Congress and the President in which this Court should not interfere unless and until Congress has asserted its authority."

On September 13, 2019, the United States Court of Appeals for the Second Circuit vacated and remanded Daniels's decision in a 2–1 ruling, holding that at least one plaintiff had standing. The case was ultimately rendered moot in January 2021, when the Supreme Court of the United States dismissed it following the end of Trump's first term.

==== Public charge rule (2020) ====
On July 29, 2020, Daniels blocked the Trump administration's expanded "public charge" immigration rule—which made it easier to deny green cards to immigrants who had used public benefits such as Medicaid or food stamps—finding that states and nonprofit organizations challenging the rule had provided "ample evidence" that the policy was deterring immigrants from seeking COVID-19 testing during the pandemic.

==== Columbia University ERISA litigation (2021) ====
Daniels presided over a class action involving approximately 28,000 current and former Columbia University employees alleging that the university had mismanaged two employee retirement plans in violation of the Employee Retirement Income Security Act (ERISA). Columbia ultimately settled the case for $13 million.

==== DoorDash, Inc. v. City of New York (2026) ====
On January 24, 2026, Daniels denied a motion for a preliminary injunction brought by DoorDash and Uber Technologies seeking to block two New York City laws requiring food delivery applications to present a tipping option to customers at or before checkout—rather than after delivery—and to include suggested tip amounts starting at a minimum of 10 percent. The laws were enacted after the companies moved their tipping prompts to a post-checkout screen and raised service fees following New York City's 2023 minimum wage law, which set delivery worker pay at a minimum of $21.44 per hour.

DoorDash and Uber argued the laws violated their First Amendment rights by dictating how their applications communicate with consumers about tipping. Daniels rejected this claim, finding that the laws likely implicate only commercial speech, which receives more limited constitutional protection, and that the requirements were "not overly burdensome" and advanced the city's legitimate goals of enhancing cost transparency and protecting delivery workers. He further found that the companies had failed to demonstrate irreparable harm. Both companies immediately appealed the decision.

== Publications ==
Daniels is a co-author of New York Criminal Law (West Publishing Co., 1996), part of West's New York Practice Series, a comprehensive treatise on New York criminal law published while he was a sitting state court judge.

== Teaching and international judicial training ==
Throughout his career, Daniels has been active in legal education and international judicial training. In addition to his adjunct professorship at Brooklyn Law School (1988–1991), he has served as a trial advocacy instructor at Hofstra Law School, the Benjamin N. Cardozo School of Law, the National Institute for Trial Advocacy (NITA), and the United States Attorney General's Advocacy Institute.

Internationally, Daniels has participated in judicial training programs in several countries:

- Liberia: Through Lawyers Without Borders, he led a trial advocacy training program for approximately 40 Liberian prosecutors, public defenders, and magistrate judges. Of the work, he said: "The problems are so serious; you recognize it doesn't take a lot to make a difference."
- Tanzania: Served as a trial advocacy instructor at the International Criminal Tribunal for Rwanda in Arusha.
- Namibia: Taught intellectual property law to judges from the southern African region.

== Civic roles and honors ==
=== Bar associations and judicial organizations ===
Daniels has served as Vice President of the New York City Bar Association and as a member of the Board of Directors of the New York City Bar Fund, the Association's charitable arm supporting legal services for low-income New Yorkers. He has also served on the committee of the Cyrus R. Vance Center for International Justice, a program of the NYCBA that coordinates pro bono legal representation for civil society organizations around the world.

He serves as a Commissioner on the New York courts' Franklin H. Williams Judicial Commission, which works to advance racial and ethnic fairness in the state judiciary. In September 2024, the Commission hosted a program at the Daniel Patrick Moynihan United States Courthouse celebrating Daniels's 25 years of service on the federal bench; the event included a panel, moderated by Daniels, titled "Becoming a Federal Judge," providing guidance to diverse attorneys on navigating the judicial nomination process.

Daniels is active in the Network of Bar Leaders (NOBL), a coalition of bar association leaders in New York; he delivered the keynote address at NOBL's 2019 Presidents' Dinner and swore in new board members at the organization's September 2021 Induction and Installation Ceremony. He has also sworn in officers of the Metropolitan Black Bar Association.

== Judicial philosophy ==
In a 2019 interview with the American Bar Association Litigation Section, alongside Judges Denny Chin, Joseph Greenaway, and Theodore McKee, Daniels described objectivity as the most important quality of a good judge, saying the greatest challenge is "learning to see the world through eyes other than your own." He advised aspiring judges that "success is usually when skill and opportunity meet."

== See also ==
- In re Terrorist Attacks on September 11, 2001
- Justice Against Sponsors of Terrorism Act
- List of African-American federal judges
- List of African-American jurists

Legal offices
Preceded by Robert P. Patterson, Jr.	Judge of the United States District Court for the Southern District of New York; 2000–2021	Succeeded by Jennifer L. Rochon
