= Saleh Al al-Sheikh =

Saudi Arabian politician

- صالح بن عبد العزيز آل الشيخ
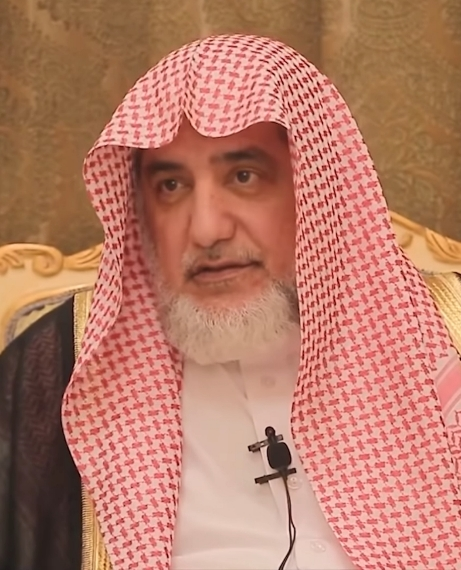
- Al-Sheikh in 2021

Minister of Islamic Affairs, Dawah, and Guidance
- In office 16 July 1999 – 8 December 2014
- Succeeded by: Suleiman bin Abdullah Aba Al Khail

Personal details
- Born: 1959 (age 66–67) Riyadh, Saudi Arabia
- Education: Imam Mohammad Ibn Saud Islamic University
- Website: http://saleh.af.org.sa/

Saleh bin Abdul-Aziz Al al-Sheikh (born 1959) is a Saudi cleric who served as the minister of Islamic affairs, endowments, call and guidance of Saudi Arabia between 1996 and 2014, and again since 2015. He is a member of the Al ash-Sheikh, the influential Saudi religious family.

== Background and career ==
Saleh bin Abdul-Aziz Al al-Sheikh is a member of a noted family of Saudi religious scholars, the Al al-Sheikh. The Sheikh is well known for his studies of the fatwas of his grandfather, Sheikh Muhammad bin Ibrahim. He is a graduate from Imam Muhammad ibn Saud Islamic University in Riyadh, from the Faculty of Fundamentals of Islamic Religion and wrote several books on various topics of Islamic Sciences.

He has been minister of Islamic affairs, endowments, call and guidance since 2000. His term as minister of Islamic affairs, endowments, call and guidance ended on 8 December 2014 when Suleiman bin Abdullah Aba Al Khail replaced him in the post, but only for a short time. He was re-appointed in February 2015.

In July 2016, he met with the Minister of Civil Affairs of Bosnia, Adil Osmanovic, to discuss possible cooperation in educational reforms and investments in culture, economic development, and infrastructure. During the same month, the Sheikh met with Pakistani Minister of Religious Affairs and Inter-faith Harmony Sardar Mohammed Yousaf to strengthen the ties between Saudi Arabia and Pakistan.

In July 2017, Al al-Sheikh called upon Qatar to change the name of the main mosque in Doha, the mosque Imam Abdul Wahaab, claiming that the Sheikh Hamad bin Khalifa Al Thani, then the Emir of Qatar, had wrongly claimed himself as a descendant of Imam Abdul Wahaab. In January 2018, Al al-Sheikh called for the defense of a Muslim Jerusalem, and publicly stated his support for the Palestinian cause.

== Religious work ==
He is upon the Hanbali school of thought in Islam, and wrote extensively on Islamic faith and practice. In his essay This is Islam, he explains in detail Islam's role in daily life, particularly in the realms of Aqidah (referring to matters which are believed wholeheartedly and with conviction), worship, Sharia (Islamic Law), system of government, morals, wealth and economy activity, international relations, civilization, disagreement and dialogue, and moderation.

In Islamic Principles for the Muslim's Attitude During Fitan (Trials, Tribulations, Afflictions, and Calamities), the Sheikh describes the best practices for Muslims when faced with strife and conflict. He lays out nine principles to be used in such moments, which pertain to ways of conducting oneself, as well as general guidelines which must be respected.

Saleh bin Abdul-Aziz Al al-Sheikh also wrote Clarification of Some Common Mistakes in which the chapter 40 Common Mistakes in Salaat [Prayer] outlines common mistakes performed during the Islamic prayer and how to rectify them, including body positioning and recitations.

== Publications ==
- Islamic Principles for the Muslim’s Attitude During Fitan (Trials, Tribulations, Afflictions, and Calamities), Quran Sunnah Educational Programs, 1411 Hijri/October 1990
- Clarification of Some Common Mistakes, 1413 Hijri/1992
- Explanation The Book of Tawheed, 1424 Hijri/2003
- Explanation of the Four Fundamentals, 1433 Hijri/2014

== See also ==
- Council of Ministers of Saudi Arabia
- Politics of Saudi Arabia
