= Jennifer L. Rochon =

American judge (born 1970)

Jennifer Rochon
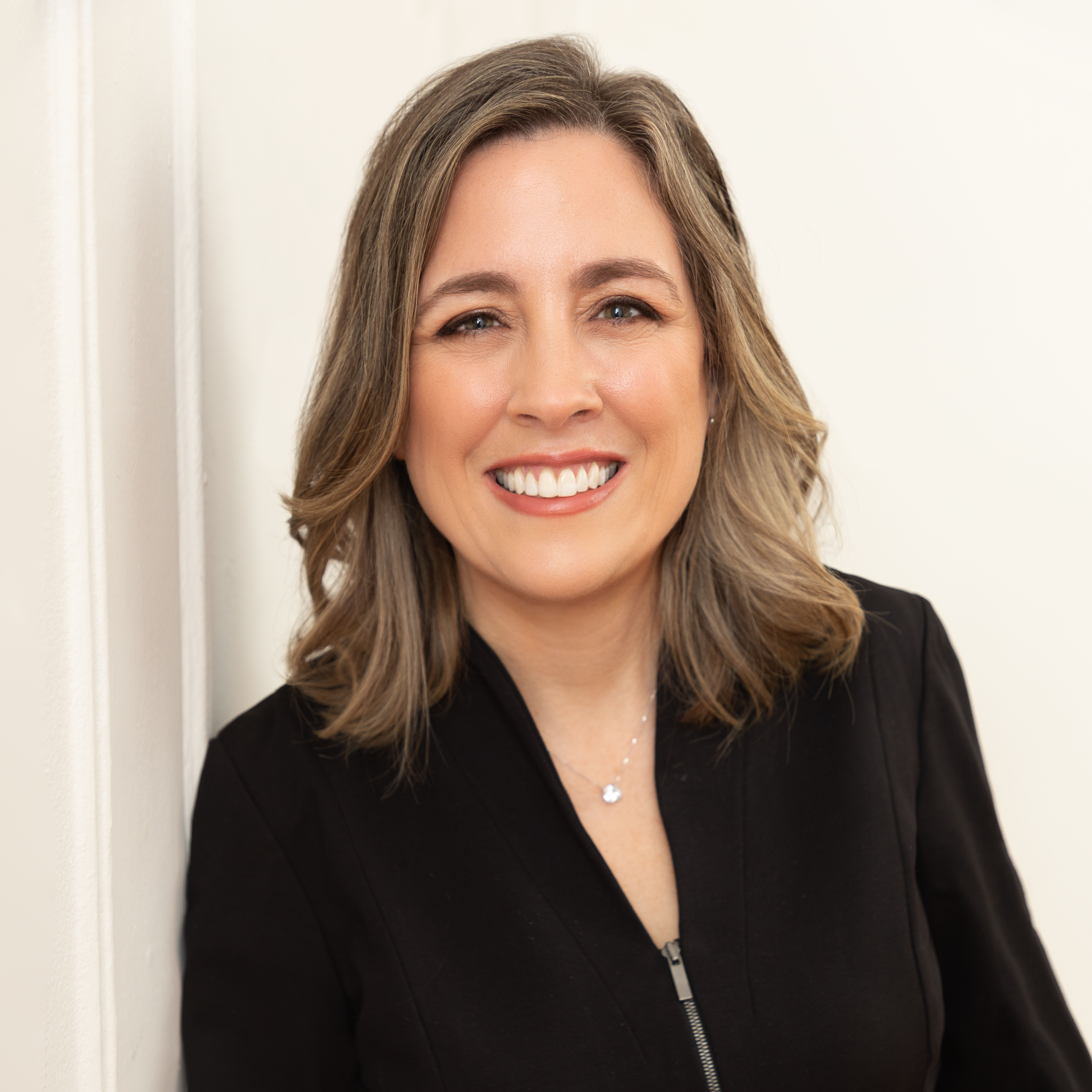

Judge of the United States District Court for the Southern District of New York
- Incumbent
- Assumed office June 13, 2022
- Appointed by: Joe Biden
- Preceded by: George B. Daniels

Personal details
- Born: 1970 (age 55–56) St. Clair, Michigan, U.S.
- Education: University of Michigan (BA); New York University (JD)

Jennifer Louise Rochon (born 1970) is an American lawyer serving as a United States district judge of the United States District Court for the Southern District of New York since 2022. From 2013 to 2022, she was general counsel of the Girl Scouts of the USA.

== Early life and education ==
Rochon was born in St. Clair, Michigan. She graduated from the University of Michigan in 1992 with a Bachelor of Arts, then spent two years in the Peace Corps as a mathematics teacher in Antigua. She then attended the New York University School of Law, where she was a notes and comment editor of the New York University Law Review and a semi-finalist in the school's moot court competition. She graduated in 1997 with a Juris Doctor.

== Career ==
From 1997 to 2000, Rochon served as a law clerk for Judge Maryanne Trump Barry of the United States District Court for the District of New Jersey and United States Court of Appeals for the Third Circuit. Rochon was an associate at Kramer Levin Naftalis & Frankel from 2000 to 2006 and a partner from 2006 to 2013. Rochon represented immigration organizations as amici in constitutional challenges to the Immigration and Nationality Act. From 2013 to 2022, she worked as General Counsel for Girl Scouts of the USA.

=== Federal judicial service ===
On December 15, 2021, President Joe Biden nominated Rochon to serve as a United States district judge of the United States District Court for the Southern District of New York. President Biden nominated Rochon to the seat vacated by Judge George B. Daniels, who assumed senior status on May 1, 2021. On February 1, 2022, a hearing on her nomination was held before the Senate Judiciary Committee. On March 10, 2022, her nomination was reported out of committee by a 12–10 vote. On May 17, 2022, the United States Senate invoked cloture on her nomination by a 51–47 vote. On May 18, 2022, her nomination was confirmed by a 51–47 vote. She received her judicial commission on June 13, 2022.

Legal offices
Preceded by George B. Daniels	United States District Court for the Southern District of New York; 2022–present	Incumbent
