= Abdullatif bin Abdulaziz Al-Sheikh =

Saudi Arabian politician

His Excellency Abdullatif bin Abdulaziz Al-Sheikh
- عبد اللطيف بن عبد العزيز آل الشيخ
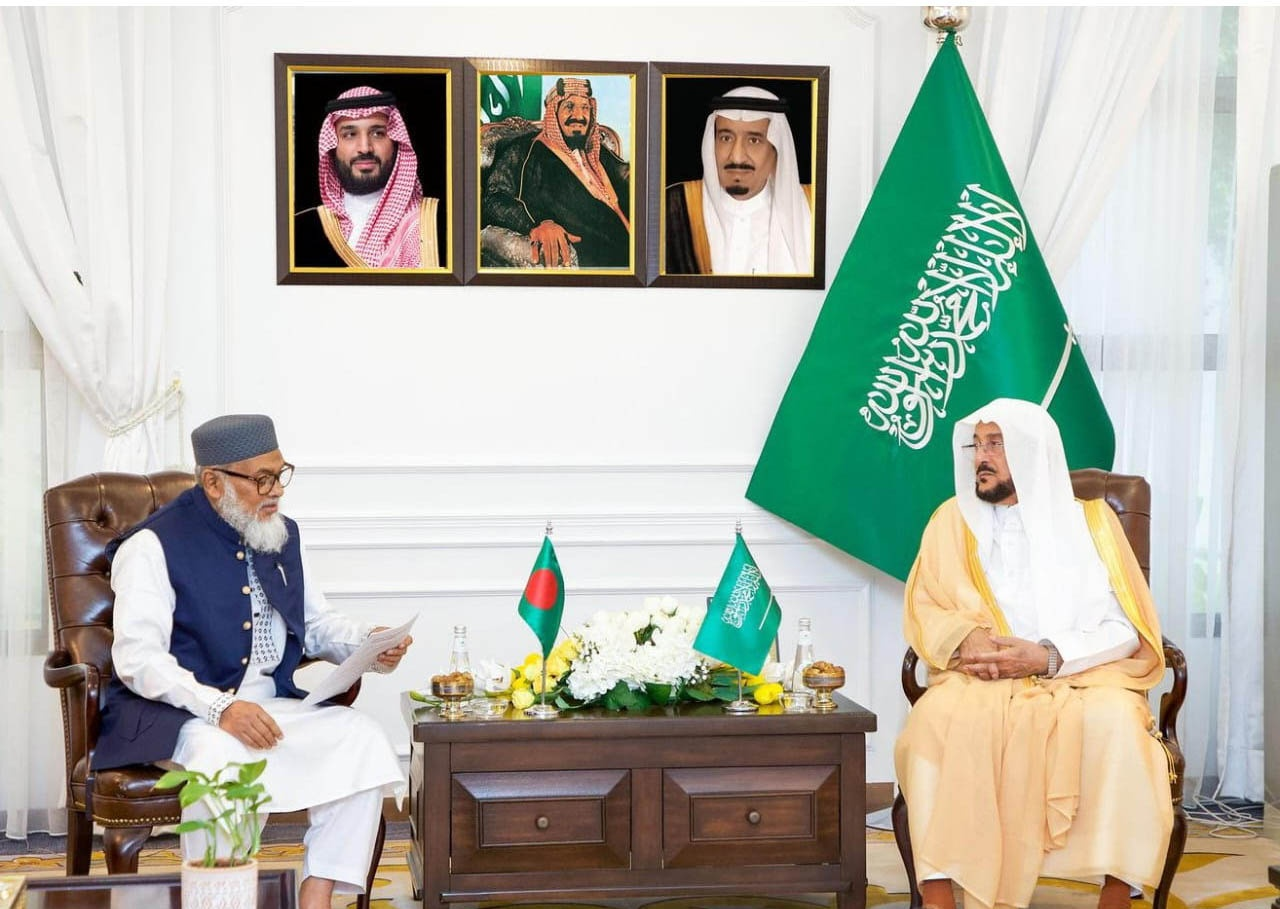

Minister of Islamic Affairs, Dawah, and Guidance
- Incumbent
- Assumed office June 2018

Abdullatif bin Abdulaziz Al-Sheikh (Arabic: عبد اللطيف بن عبد العزيز آل الشيخ) is the current Minister of Islamic Affairs, Dawah, and Guidance in Saudi Arabia since June 2018.
