= The 28 pages =

Portion of US Congressional report on 9/11 attacks

The 28 pages refers to the final section of the December 2002 report of the Joint Inquiry into Intelligence Community Activities before and after the Terrorist Attacks of September 11, 2001, conducted by the Senate Select Committee on Intelligence and the House Permanent Select Committee on Intelligence. This section is titled "Part IV: Finding, Discussion and Narrative Regarding Certain Sensitive National Security Matters," and summarizes investigative leads describing financial, logistical and other support provided to the hijackers and their associates by Saudi Arabian officials and others suspected of being Saudi agents. It was declassified on July 15, 2016.

== Contents ==
Declassified 28 pages

The 28 pages state that some of the 9/11 hijackers received financial support from individuals connected to the Saudi government. FBI sources believed that at least two of those individuals were officers in the General Intelligence Presidency, the primary intelligence agency of Saudi Arabia. The United States Intelligence Community believed that individuals associated with the Saudi government had ties to al-Qaeda.

Plaintiffs in a 9/11 civil suit against Saudi Arabia have alleged that a November 1999 attempt by two men with longstanding ties to the Saudi government—Mohammed al-Qudhaeein and Hamdan al-Shalawi—to get inside an America West Airlines plane's cockpit was "a dry run for the 9/11 attacks." The FBI confirmed that the Embassy of Saudi Arabia in Washington, D.C. paid for Qudhaeein and Shalawi's tickets to board that flight. The 28 pages quoted a document from the FBI's Phoenix Field Office as stating: "Phoenix FBI now believes both men were specifically attempting to test the security procedures of America West Airlines in preparation for and in furtherance of UBL [Osama bin Laden]/Al Qaeda operations." A report in the Arizona Daily Wildcat from November 30, 1999, said that "Language analysis doctoral student Muhammad Al-Qudhaieen" and a friend were considering suing the FBI for alleged ethnic discrimination over having been handcuffed in front of fellow passengers 11 days earlier, November 19, 1999, during an "aircraft inspection" in Columbus, Ohio. (This newspaper report documents the date of the incident and the airport used for the emergency landing.)

Some leaked information from CIA and FBI documents alleges that there is "incontrovertible evidence" that Saudi government officials, including from the Saudi embassy in Washington and consulate in Los Angeles, gave the hijackers both financial and logistical aid. Among those named were then-Saudi Ambassador Prince Bandar and Osama Bassnan, a Saudi agent, as well as American al-Qaeda cleric Anwar al-Awlaki, 9/11 ringleader Mohamed Atta, and Esam Ghazzawi, a Saudi adviser to the nephew of King Fahd.

== Classification decision ==
When the congressional joint inquiry report was published in July 2003, the 28-page section on possible Saudi links to the attacks was completely redacted at the insistence of the George W. Bush administration. President Bush claimed that releasing the material would "reveal sources and methods that would make it harder for us to win the war on terror."

== Movement to declassify the pages ==
In July 2003, Senator Bob Graham pressed the Senate Select Committee on Intelligence to release the material, in accordance with its authority under Senate Resolution 400, which established the Committee in 1976. However, the committee did not vote, and his request was merely denied. Then-chair Senator Pat Roberts and Senator Jay Rockefeller wrote Graham that "it is our view that release of additional information from Part Four could adversely affect ongoing counterterrorism efforts." Graham later said the response showed that the Intelligence Committee had shown "a strong deference to the executive branch." In the same month, Senator Sam Brownback (R-Kan.) joined approximately 42 Democratic senators in calling on President Bush to release the 28-page section which was censored for "national security reasons". Senator Graham stated the refusal "is a continuation of the pattern of the last seven months—a pattern of delay and excessive use of national security standards to deny the people the knowledge of their vulnerability."

Members of Congress periodically tried to effect the declassification of the 28 pages. In 2013, Representatives Walter B. Jones, Jr. and Stephen Lynch introduced a resolution urging President Barack Obama to declassify the pages; Representatives Jones, Lynch and Massie introduced a similar resolution in 2015, which amassed 71 cosponsors. In the same year, Senator Rand Paul introduced a bill to compel Obama to release the pages, and Senators Ron Wyden and Kirsten Gillibrand joined as cosponsors.

In 2015, the U.S. government released a 9/11 Commission document, compiled by Dana Lesemann and Michael Jacobson, known as "Document 17." It was an overview of individuals of interest to investigators pursuing potential links to the Saudi government. Among dozens of named individuals are Fahad al-Thumairy, Omar al-Bayoumi, Osama Bassnan and Mohdhar Abdullah. Document 17 was first brought to public attention on April 19, 2016, on the website 28Pages.org. According to then-former Senator Bob Graham, "Much of the information upon which File 17 was written was based on what's in the 28 pages."

In April 2016, 60 Minutes aired a segment on the drive to declassify the 28 pages, featuring interviews with former Senator Graham, former Congressman and 9/11 Commission member Tim Roemer, and former 9/11 Commission member John Lehman, as well as attorneys representing 9/11 family members, survivors, and insurers. On the afternoon before the 60 Minutes segment aired, House Democratic Leader Nancy Pelosi issued a statement urging the release of the pages. The Saudi government voiced support for the declassification of the 28 pages, saying it would "allow us to respond to any allegations in a clear and credible manner". Congressman Stephen Lynch said, "I think there may be some duplicity on the part of the Saudis in terms of them desiring this to be disclosed."

In July 2016, during the 2016 Republican National Convention, a proposed plank supporting the declassification of the 28 pages advanced from the national security subcommittee of the convention's platform committee. A motion to kill the plank was approved by the subsequent meeting of the full committee Steve Yates led the successful effort to remove the plank.

== Declassification ==
In 2016, following a declassification review, the Obama administration approved the declassification of the partially redacted 28 pages, the joint inquiry's only wholly classified section. The document was then sent to congressional leadership and on July 15, 2016, the House Permanent Select Committee on Intelligence approved publication of the newly declassified section.

This declassification followed years of lobbying by families of those killed in the September 11 attacks, insurance companies and others. One influential figure in this effort was Bob Graham, who was a member of the Joint Inquiry into Intelligence Community Activities before and after the Terrorist Attacks of September 11, 2001 as a senator from Florida. Among other things, he said, "the F.B.I. has gone beyond just covering up ... into what I call aggressive deception."

In addition to the events documented in "the 28 pages", U.S. federal government agencies seem to have had three other apparently independent sources of advance warning of the September 11 attacks that were not reported to the Joint Inquiry into Intelligence Community Activities before and after the Terrorist Attacks of September 11, 2001. One was a Saudi family in Sarasota, Florida, which was known by the FBI to have had multiple contacts with the hijackers-to-be training nearby, until the family fled just before the attacks. Another was the Able Danger data mining operation, which reportedly identified two of the three terrorist cells, who subsequently executed the September 11 attacks. A third was an Iranian expatriate, who had warned the FBI multiple times of the impending September 11 attacks. Sibel Edmonds was reportedly fired for insisting that the evidence they had not be suppressed as she says it was.

== Location of the 28 pages ==
The document is kept in a sensitive compartmented information facility (SCIF) in the basement of the Capitol building in Washington, D.C.

== See also ==
- Sibel Edmonds, who was a translator for the FBI from late September 2001 until March 2002. She said that in that capacity she saw documentation of advanced warnings of the September 11 attacks that were completely independent of "The 28 pages", which FBI personnel were ordered to cover up.
- Able Danger
- Alleged Saudi government role in the September 11 attacks
- 9/11 conspiracy theories
