= Yusuf bin Muhammad bin Saeed =

Deputy Minister of Islamic Affairs, Dawah, and Guidance
- Incumbent
- Assumed office 27 December 2018

Personal details
- Occupation: Preacher, Imam

Yusuf bin Muhammad bin Saeed (Arabic: يوسف بن محمد بن سعيد) is the deputy minister in the Ministry of Islamic Affairs, Dawah, and Guidance in Saudi Arabia since 27 December 2018. On 18 October 2020, a royal decree was issued appointing him a member of the Council of Senior Scholars. Later on the approval of the General Presidency of Haramain he became a member of the Council of Senior Scholars while delivering a sermon on the Day of Arafah, 2023 respectively.
