= On Native Soil =

On Native Soil is a 2006 documentary by Linda Ellman narrated by Kevin Costner and Hilary Swank. The film analyzes the efforts by the families of 9/11 victims to create the 9/11 Commission and what information was revealed by it in the 9/11 Commission Report.
