= King Fahad Mosque (Culver City) =

Mosque in Los Angeles County, California

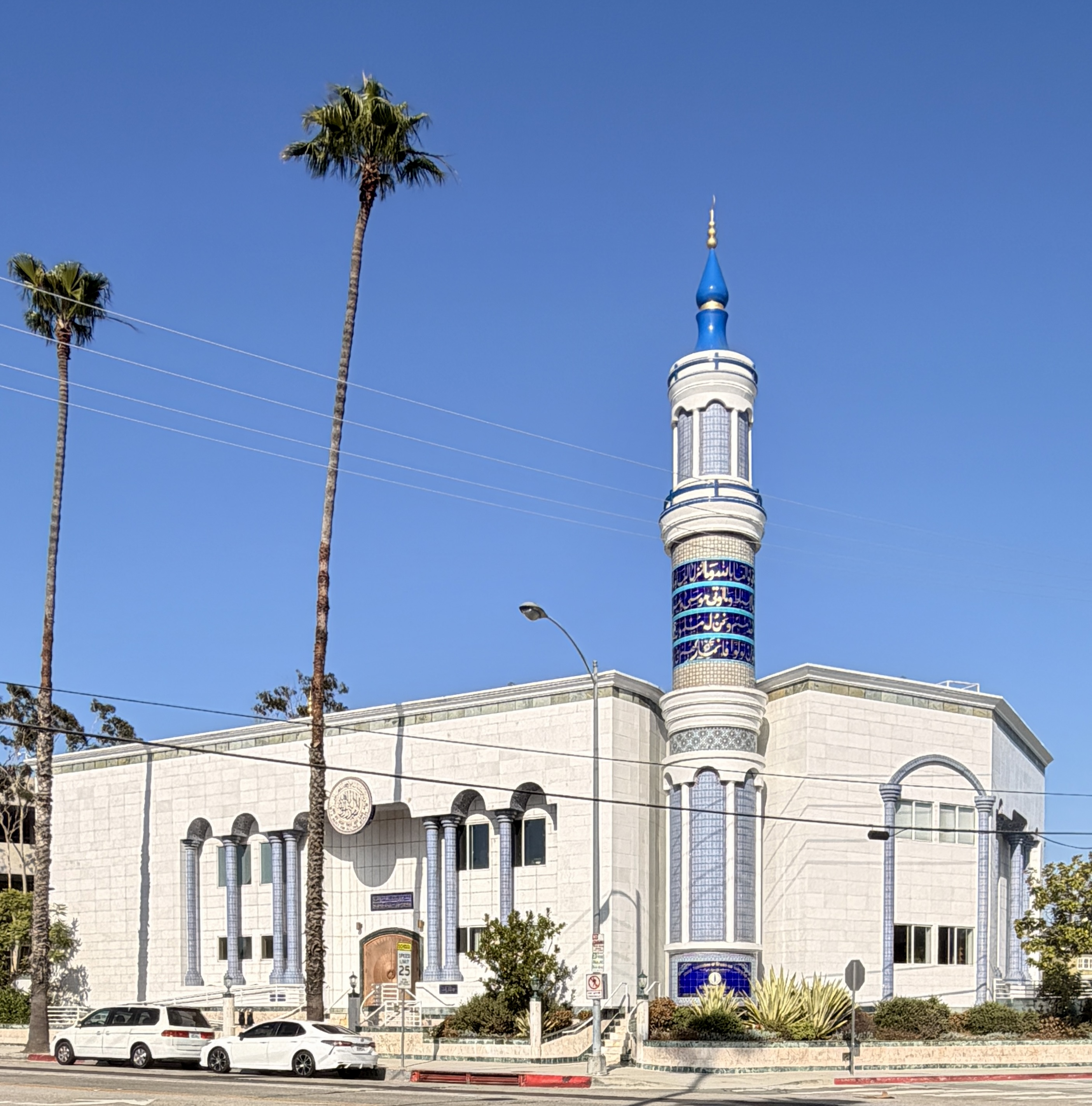

- Location in California

Religion
- Affiliation: Islam
- Branch/tradition: Sunni

Location
- Location: 10980 Washington Blvd, Culver City, California 90232, US
- Coordinates: 34.011522°N 118.410197°W

Architecture
- Type: Mosque
- Style: Islamic Architecture
- Established: 1998
- Construction cost: $2.16-$8 million

Specifications
- Capacity: 2,000
- Dome: 2
- Minaret: 1

Website
- Official Website

The King Fahad Mosque (also King Fahd Mosque) is a mosque located in Culver City, California in Los Angeles County, US. The mosque has a capacity of 2,000 worshippers and a 72-foot high (22 m) minaret. The complex on about 77,500 square feet (7,200 m^{2}) of land contains other facilities including a lecture and meeting hall and classrooms.

The mosque was financed by Saudi Arabia, specifically by Fahd of Saudi Arabia, after whom it is named. It cost $2.16 million according to the Embassy of Saudi Arabia, and $8 million according to Washington Post.

Prince Abdulaziz Bin Fahad Bin Abdulaziz Al-Saud, who was Minister of State and a Saudi cabinet member, provided funding for the land in 1993. King Fahad pledged funds for the construction of the building in 1995. Work began on the mosque in April 1996 and was opened in July 1998, with a ceremony and dinner attended by former chief of the White House staff John Sununu.

The mosque is owned and managed by The Islamic Foundation of Shaikh Ibn Taymiyyah.

== The Islamic Foundation of Shaikh Ibn Taymiyyah ==
The Islamic Foundation of Shaikh Ibn Taymiyyah preceded the mosque. It supervised its planning, design, etc., and now owns and operates the mosque (as well as that of two other Southern California mosques — Masjid al Salam in central Los Angeles, and Islamic Center of Riverside, California — and supervises "Zamzam Schools" for "girls' education and the memorization of the Qur'an"). The foundation was established in 1980 (1400 AH). It began as the "Muslim Student House" in the western Los Angeles area. As the Muslim population and Saudi funding grew, a house was purchased in the same area for prayers, lectures and Dawa activities. The foundation is now located at 11004 Washington Boulevard, across Huron Ave from the Mosque.

Named after the 14th century Islamic jurist, Ibn Taymiyyah, the foundation is an Islamic charity organization under US law, and as such is exempt from taxes, entitled to own property and practice religious, educational, informational and intellectual activities throughout the US. As of 2017 it reported revenues of $320,000 and five employees.

The foundation's stated objectives include propagating Islam, unifying Muslims, building mosques, schools and colleges, holding conferences and publishing books.

== 9/11 investigation ==
According to FBI documents and a CIA memo noted in the Congressional report into the September 11, 2001 attacks, the hijackers Khalid al-Midhar and Nawaf al-Hazmi may have been in contact with Saudi diplomat Shaykh Fahad al-Thumairy, who was the chief imam at the King Fahad Mosque (most of the 9/11 hijackers were Saudi nationals and several were not fluent in English and had little experience living in the West). According to the congressional report, the mosque was identified by the FBI as a site of “extremist-related activity both before and after September 11”. According to the commission, “several subjects of FBI investigations prior to September 11 had close connections to the mosque and are believed to have laundered money through this mosque to nonprofit organizations overseas affiliated with Usama Bin Ladin.”

In May 2003, the US State Department refused to allow Fahad al Thumairy to reenter the United States. According to the 9/11 Commission Report (issued July 2004), the U.S. State Department had determined "he might be connected with terrorist activity."

However, "later investigations found no evidence that the Saudi government or senior Saudi officials knowingly supported those who orchestrated the attacks," according to CBS News. Saudi Foreign Minister Adel Aljubeir said he hopes the congressional report will “bring an end to the speculation and conspiracy theories.” A small demonstration by conservatives was held "challenged the mosque to issue a fatwa repudiating Osama bin Laden and other terrorists by name" in September 2006.

== See also ==
- List of mosques in the Americas
- Lists of mosques
- List of mosques in the United States
- International propagation of Salafism and Wahhabism
