= Omar al-Bayoumi =

Saudi national terror suspect

- عمر البيومي
- Born: 1957 (age 68–69); Al Hijra, Jeddah, Saudi Arabia

Omar Moustafa al-Bayoumi (Arabic: عمر البيومي, romanized: ʿUmar al-Bayyūmī) is a Saudi national who provided significant support in the United States to Nawaf al-Hazmi and Khalid al-Mihdhar, two of the 9/11 hijackers. He also had links to key al-Qaeda organizer Anwar al-Awlaki who led Al-Qaeda in the Arabian Peninsula. Despite extensive ties to the Saudi Arabian government and its ministries, the country claims al-Bayoumi is not a spy.

== Life ==
Declassified FBI files describe him as being from an Egyptian family that migrated to Saudi Arabia. Until 1994, he lived in Saudi Arabia, working for the Saudi Ministry of Defense and Aviation, a department headed by Prince Sultan bin Abdul Aziz.

In August 1994, al-Bayoumi moved to the United States and settled in San Diego, California, where he became involved in the local Muslim community. He was perceived as being very inquisitive, and was known to always carry around a video camera. According to several sources, al-Bayoumi was strongly suspected by many residents to be a Saudi government spy. The man the FBI considered their "best source" in San Diego said that al-Bayoumi "must be an intelligence officer for Saudi Arabia or another foreign power," according to Newsweek magazine.

During this time, al-Bayoumi was purportedly a San Diego State University student learning remedial English in the United States as part of a Saudi work-study program. In fact, he only attended the fall, 1994 semester.

=== Income ===
The Saudi General Authority of Civil Aviation paid al-Bayoumi's salary through a government contractor. When the contractor proposed terminating its relationship with al-Bayoumi in 1999, a Saudi government official replied with a letter marked "extremely urgent" that the government wanted al-Bayoumi's contract renewed "as quickly as possible." As a result, Al-Bayoumi's employment with the project continued.

When interviewed by the FBI in 2003, al-Bayoumi stated he worked for Saudi aviation company Dallah AVCO. Witnesses at Dallah AVCO describe al-Bayoumi as one of 50 "ghost employees" who were paid by the company despite never showing up for work. One witness described al-Bayoumi accruing such outrageous expenses that at one point AVCO refused to pay him.

Al-Bayoumi came to the FBI’s attention in 1998 when his apartment manager reported him receiving packages from the Middle East containing exposed wiring and hosting large gatherings of Middle Eastern men at his residence.

Some time in late 1999 or early 2000, al-Bayoumi began receiving another monthly payment; this one from Princess Haifa bint Faisal, the wife of Bandar bin Sultan, the Saudi ambassador to the U.S. Cheques for between $2,000 and $3,000 were sent monthly from the princess, through two or three intermediaries, to al-Bayoumi. The payments continued for several years, totalling between $50,000 and $75,000. According to the documents of the 2002 congressional inquiry into the September 11 attacks, al-Bayoumi was not the direct recipient of the checks; Osama Bassnan's wife was. Bassnan was a close associate of al-Bayoumi, and commented to an FBI source "that he did more for the hijackers than al-Bayoumi did." The report further states that, although the money was ostensibly meant for Bassnan, al-Bayoumi's wife had attempted to deposit three of the cheques into her own account.

=== Connection with hijackers Al-Hazmi and Al-Mihdhar ===
On 15 January 2000, after attending the 2000 al-Qaeda summit for Al Qaeda members in Kuala Lumpur, Malaysia, future 9/11 hijackers Nawaf al-Hazmi and Khalid al-Mihdhar flew from Bangkok, Thailand to Los Angeles, California. Al-Bayoumi reportedly helped these two hijackers to settle in the United States, eventually finding them housing in the neighborhood where he resided. During the period that he did so, his salary greatly increased.

The final 9/11 Commission Report noted:

"Hazmi and Mihdhar were ill-prepared for a mission in the United States. ... Neither had spent any substantial time in the West, and neither spoke much, if any, English. It would therefore be plausible that they or [Khalid Sheikh Mohammed] would have tried to identify, in advance, a friendly contact for them in the United States. ... We believe it unlikely that Hazmi and Mihdhar ... would have come to the United States without arranging to receive assistance from one or more individuals informed in advance of their arrival."

After they landed, Al-Bayoumi met them at the Mediterranean Gourmet Restaurant on Venice Boulevard. He invited them to move to San Diego with him, where he found them an apartment, co-signed the lease, and advanced them $1,500 to help pay for their rent. (The 9/11 Commission, however, concluded that "[n]either then nor later did Bayoumi give money to either Hazmi or Mihdhar.") Al-Bayoumi also helped them obtain driver's licenses, rides to the Social Security office, and information on flight schools. Living nearby al-Bayoumi, they were constantly seen by neighbors playing flight simulator games and being picked up by limousines in the middle of the night. Their neighbors later said they perceived them as strange. They later moved into the house of Abdussattar Shaikh, a friend of al-Bayoumi's, who was secretly working as an FBI informant at the time.

An October 2012 FBI report (declassified several years after it was written) named Fahad al-Thumairy, a Saudi Islamic Affairs official and King Fahd Mosque imam, as having worked with al-Bayoumi. The report also named another Saudi embassy official, Mussaed Ahmed al-Jarrah, who allegedly had ordered al-Bayoumi and al-Thumairy to assist the hijackers; this man's name was not declassified, but was accidentally revealed when the FBI neglected to redact his name from a document filed in April 2020.

Al-Bayoumi claims he met them by happenstance, was being kind to fellow Muslims in need, and had no idea of their plans. Some FBI officials concluded that al-Bayoumi was an unwitting accomplice of the hijackers. As one explained: "We could not find any contact between him and terrorists, any involvement (with al-Qaeda). There was nothing to indicate he's any different from any of the hundreds of people who had contact with the hijackers, who were unwitting to the fact that they were going to be hijackers. It just wasn't there." But one former top FBI official told Newsweek: "We firmly believed that he had knowledge [of the 9/11 plot] and that his meeting with them that day was more than coincidence."

According to an FBI report from 2016, declassified by President Biden on September 12, 2021, the FBI said al-Thumairy "tasked" al-Bayoumi with providing assistance to the two hijackers. al-Thumairy also told al-Bayoumi that al-Hazmi and al-Mihdhar were, "two very significant people," more than a year before the attacks. The report goes on to state that despite al-Bayoumi's characterization of the meeting with the two hijackers as coincidental, "Caisin Bin Don", a US citizen formerly known as Clayton Morgan, reported al-Bayoumi waiting by the window of the Mediterranean Gourmet Restaurant for the hijackers to arrive, and had a lengthy conversation with them in Arabic. Another witness reports al-Bayoumi was often saying the Islamic community needed to "take action" and that the community was "at jihad."

The declassified documents also released transcripts of FBI interviews with the-then-landlady of al-Bayoumi. She would be first interviewed by the FBI in October of 2001. The landlady to the 9/11 hijackers and new property manager of Parkwood Apartments, Holly Ratchford, disputes al-Bayoumi's claims the relationship with the eventual hijackers were fleeting and insignificant. In a 2026 interview with the BBC, Ratchford stated Bayoumi asked her on multiple occasions to find housing for the two. She also stated having seen them frequent Bayoumi's flat throughout the weeks, even saying she had cookies and tea with the pair. Ratchford said she originally denied them housing as they didn't meet the income criteria. The next day Bayoumi would take them to the nearest bank and open a bank account for them. To get around the income requirements, Bayoumi would co-sign their lease. Bayoumi's external income would more than double while the two stayed in San Diego and decreased after they left.

In June 2024, a federal court unsealed video footage dated between June and July 1999 and recorded over several days by al-Bayoumi in Washington D.C., showing various landmarks, notably the U.S. Capitol. In the video al-Bayoumi, who was allegedly accompanied by two Saudi diplomats, can be heard mentioning some "plan" and promising to someone "I will report you in detail what is there".

=== 2001 arrest and release ===
On June 14, 2001, Al-Sudairy was recorded at an address in Falls Church, Virginia, the same area where Hazmi, Midhar, Aulaqi, and Hani Hanjour established residence later in the evolution of the 9/11 plot. In July 2001, al-Bayoumi moved to Birmingham, England to pursue a Saudi Government-funded PhD at Aston University.

Ten days after the September 11 attacks, al-Bayoumi was arrested by British authorities working with the FBI, who had shared intelligence suggesting Bayoumi was one of the September 11 conspirators. He was held on an immigration charge while the FBI and Scotland Yard investigated him. When questioned, Bayoumi initially denied knowing any of the hijackers. He said he had often helped people find housing but claimed not to remember the names of anyone for whom he served as the legal guarantor for an apartment. A day later, Bayoumi said he remembered helping "Nawaf" and "Khalid"—the first names of al-Hazmi and al-Mihdhar—and admitted that they were the only two people he had given such extensive support to, but claimed he avoided them after helping them move in and then left town. Holly Ratchford, the property manager of the trio, called these claims "bullshit" and said of Bayoumi "I can't believe he got away."

According to an FBI report based on subsequently available information in 2016, and declassified in 2021, phone numbers linked to a known Tier 1 Terrorist Support Entity as well as numbers associated with the spiritual advisor to Osama bin Laden and Abu Zubaydah were found on al-Bayoumi's phone by Scotland Yard at the time. Most directly, the phone number of Mutaib Al-Sudairy, roommate of a key bin Laden logistics facilitator, Ziyad Khaleel, was found on his phone. Bayoumi called this number 5 times, each call coinciding with significant logistic support of the hijackers. Specifically,

- on January 24–30, 2000 in the days before he first met the hijackers;
- the day immediately after Bayoumi met the hijackers in February 2000;
- on February 7, 2000 immediately after the apartment lease and living arrangements for Hazmi and Midhar had been finalized and funds fronted by Bayoumi.

In Bayoumi's property in Birmingham, West Midlands Police investigators also found a crude sketch of an airplane and calculations which may have been for its descent, and a collection of home videos which included footage of Bayoumi meeting Hazmi and Mihdhar and of security measures at the U.S. Capitol. This evidence were labeled critical and immediately copied and passed to the FBI.

At Paddington Green station, Bayoumi was interrogated by Metropolitan Police detectives, who suspected that he may have been involved and were given some of the evidence from his home by the FBI. However, the interrogators were not shown the possibly-incriminating sketch and videos. The Terrorism Act 2000 stipulated that suspects must be charged or released within 7 days of arrest, and Bayoumi was released after the Department of Justice told the Metropolitan Police detectives assigned to Bayoumi that evidence for extradition to the US was insufficient. After his release from custody, Bayoumi returned to Aston University, where he left with a master's degree in management research on July 31, 2002 before returning to Saudi Arabia in August. He was given back all of the evidence which had been seized from his house, including the aircraft sketch and videos. His current whereabouts are unknown.

The copied evidence from Bayoumi's apartment, including the sketch and videos, was deposited in a storeroom in Washington, and was not shown to the 9/11 Commission. CIA director George Tenet also said that he had never been shown the evidence. It was uncovered in 2012 and became public in 2021. In 2025, Conservative MP David Davis stated that "the Metropolitan Police were forced to release Omar al-Bayoumi [...] because the FBI withheld evidence."

== 9/11 Commission Report ==
In 2004, the 9/11 Commission attributed al-Bayoumi meeting the hijackers to a chance encounter at a Culver City, Los Angeles restaurant, where al-Bayoumi allegedly heard the hijackers speak Gulf-Arabic and struck up a conversation. According to the 9/11 Commission Report, there is no evidence al-Bayoumi made contributions (monetary or otherwise) beyond helping them find an apartment, help fill out the lease, and similar. There are witness descriptions of the group's restaurant visit, and later a house party at al-Hazmi's and al-Mihdhar's place, organized by al-Bayoumi. The Commission report concludes by "we have seen no credible evidence that [al-Bayoumi] believed in violent extremism or knowingly aided extremist groups." Holly Ratchford, then-landlady in San Diego to al-Bayoumi and the two hijackers, stated to the FBI that al-Bayoumi sometimes paid their rent for them. Al-Bayoumi never went to work, accrued "outrageous" expenses and was paid $90,000 by two companies linked to the Saudi Ministry of Defence. His pay more than doubled just after the two hijackers' arrival in San Diego, then returned to normal after they left.

== 2021 FBI report ==
In 2021, a 28-page FBI report was released that indicates al-Bayoumi could have been a Saudi intelligence asset. The so-called "Encore report" was created in 2016, as part of "Operation Encore", a renewed FBI investigation into potential ties of Saudi Arabia to the 9/11 hijackers. The report describes several indicators of al-Bayoumi's and Saudi Arabia's role. Phone records show al-Bayoumi had frequent contact with Fahad al-Thumairy, a local imam who also worked at the Saudi Arabia Los Angeles consulate. He also repeatedly contacted people at the Saudi Ministry of Islamic Affairs in Riyadh, and people in the Saudi intelligence community in Riyadh. A single confidential human source (CHS) told the FBI that it was common knowledge in the local Saudi community that he was "in constant contact with Saudi officials" and "everyone knew" he was some sort of government asset or intelligence monitor.

Another FBI report, declassified in March 2022, states that "there is a 50/50 chance [al-Bayoumi] had advanced knowledge the 9/11 attacks were to occur."

According to previously-classified memoranda released by the National Archives in May 2016, by 6 June 2003, the FBI suspected al-Bayoumi and "believes it is possible that he was an agent of the Saudi Government and that he may have been reporting on the local [Saudi] community to the Saudi Government officials. In addition, during its investigation, the FBI discovered that al-Bayoumi has ties to terrorist elements as well."

It is currently not known to what extent al-Bayoumi could have contributed to the hijackers, knowingly or unknowingly, besides what is documented in the 9/11 Commission Report.

The 9/11 Commission concluded in 2004 “found no evidence that the Saudi government as an institution or senior Saudi officials individually funded [al-Qaida].”

== Follow-up investigations and new evidence ==
On August 18, 2003, interrogators asked Khalid Sheikh Mohammed, the mastermind of the 9/11 attacks, whether he knew al-Bayoumi, and KSM said that he did not.

The issue was reopened early September 2003, when the potential links between al-Bayoumi and the Saudi Embassy were reported in the press. Under pressure from Congress, the FBI re-examined the case, but again concluded that the allegations were "without merit," and they "abandoned further investigation." However, contemporary news accounts reported that "countless intelligence leads that might help solve [the case] appear to have been under-investigated or completely overlooked by the FBI."

The final 9/11 Commission reports stated "we have seen no credible evidence that he believed in violent extremism, or knowingly aided extremist groups." Despite this, the FBI reached a much different conclusion in 2016 during Operation Encore. In a report, declassified on September 12, 2021, FBI agents stated that Fahad al-Thumairy "tasked" al-Bayoumi with assisting the two hijackers upon their arrival in Los Angeles, and said they were, "two very significant people," more than a year before the attacks. Rather than the chance meeting al-Bayoumi previously described to investigators, in which al-Bayoumi was seen with Hazmi and Mihdhar at a restaurant, a witness told the FBI that al-Bayoumi had been waiting at the window for their arrival, and had a lengthy conversation with them. The report says a woman told investigators that al-Bayoumi was often saying the Islamic community needs to "take action," and that the community was, "at jihad".

Per previously-classified memoranda released by the National Archives in 2016, the FBI believed that he may have been an agent of the Saudi Government and was reporting on the local community to Saudi government officials.

In March 2022, the FBI declassified a 510-page report about 9/11 that it produced in 2017. The report found that "there is a 50/50 chance [al-Bayoumi] had advanced knowledge the 9/11 attacks were to occur" from the two hijackers Hazmi and Midhar for whom he had arranged housing in San Diego. In response, 9/11 Commission chairman and former New Jersey New Jersey governor Tom Kean said in 2022 that "If that's true I'd be upset by it", adding "The FBI said it wasn't withholding anything and we believed them."

Evidence collected in 2001 by British authorities, which came from al-Bayoumi's home in Birmingham, England, was made public in August of 2024, in connection with a lawsuit that has been brought against the Saudi kingdom's government by some of the surviving families of the 9/11 attacks. The evidence includes a video taken by al-Bayoumi of the U.S. Capitol Building, which shows where security guards are located, and a document featuring an airplane sketch and an equation. The sketch was stashed away for more than a decade in a box labeled with Bayoumi's name until 2012, and was saved before it was to be destroyed. According to The New York Times, "None of the new evidence from Mr. al-Bayoumi's home conclusively proves that the Saudi government enabled the attacks, but it adds to a growing circumstantial case." Jeffrey Breinholt, former deputy director of counter-terrorism at the Department of Justice who oversaw terrorism prosecutions after 9/11, told the BBC: "We've convicted people for less."

On 28 August 2025, a US federal judge rejected Saudi Arabia’s attempt to dismiss a lawsuit by the families of 9/11 victims.
