= The 9/11 Commission Report =

U.S. government report on the September 11, 2001, terrorist attacks

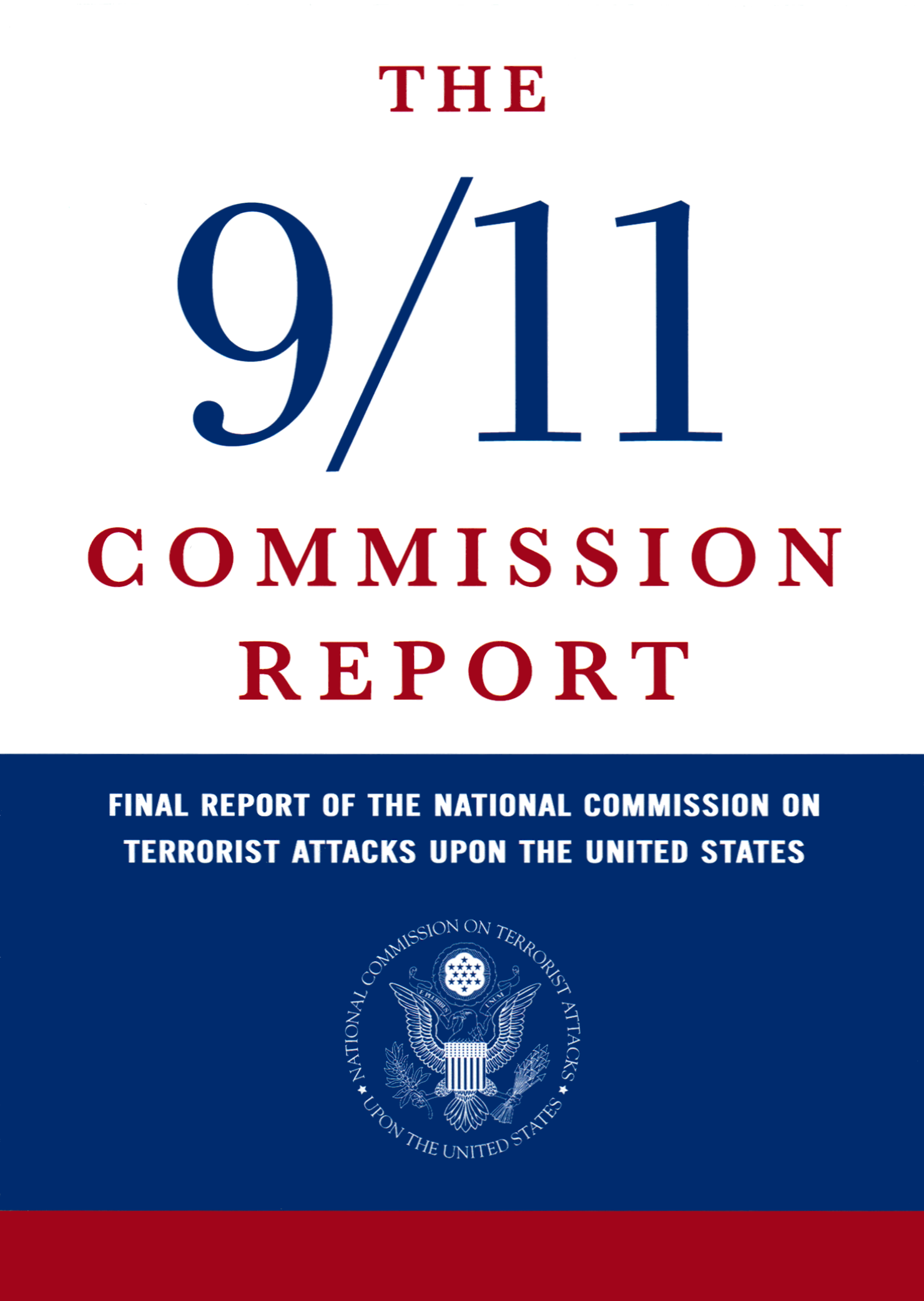
The cover of The 9/11 Commission Report, a 585-page report released July 22, 2004 by the 9/11 Commission on events leading up to the September 11 attacks and steps recommended to avoid a future terrorist attack

The 9/11 Commission Report, officially the Final Report of the National Commission on Terrorist Attacks Upon the United States, is the official report into the events leading up to the September 11, 2001, terrorist attacks. It was prepared by the 9/11 Commission, chaired by former New Jersey governor Thomas Kean, at the request of U.S. president George W. Bush and Congress.

The commission was established on November 27, 2002, 442 days after the September 11 attacks. The report, which is 585 pages in length, was originally scheduled for release on May 27, 2004, but Speaker of the House Dennis Hastert approved the commission's request for a sixty-day extension through July 26. The report was released on July 22, 2004, immediately to the public, and remains available for sale or free download.

== Findings ==
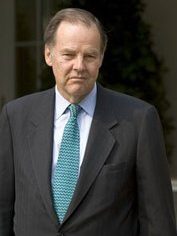
Thomas Kean, chair of the 9/11 Commission

The 9/11 Commission interviewed over 1,200 people in 10 countries and reviewed over two and a half million pages of documents, including some closely guarded classified national security documents. The commission also relied heavily on the FBI's PENTTBOM investigation. Before it was released by the commission, the final public report was screened for any potentially classified information and edited as needed.

After releasing the report, commission chair Thomas Kean declared that both presidents Bill Clinton and George W. Bush were "not well served" by the FBI and CIA.

In addition to identifying intelligence failures occurring before the attacks, the report provided evidence of the following:

- Airport security footage of the hijackers as they passed through airport security;
- Excerpts from the United Airlines Flight 93 cockpit voice recording, which recorded the sounds of the hijackers in the cockpit and the passengers' attempts to regain control; and
- Eyewitness testimony of passengers as they described their own final moments to family members and authorities on airphones and cellphones from the cabins of doomed airliners.

The commission also concluded 15 of the 19 hijackers who carried out the attacks were from Saudi Arabia, but the commission "found no evidence that the Saudi government as an institution or senior Saudi officials individually funded the organization" to conspire in the attacks, or that it funded the attackers even though the report identifies that "Saudi Arabia has long been considered the primary source of al-Qaeda funding". Mohamed Atta, the leader of the attacks, was from Egypt. Two hijackers were from the United Arab Emirates, and one was from Lebanon. According to the commission, all 19 hijackers were members of the al-Qaeda terrorist organization, led by Osama bin Laden. In addition, while meetings between al-Qaeda representatives and Iraqi government officials had taken place, the panel had no credible evidence that Saddam Hussein had assisted al-Qaeda in preparing or executing the 9/11 attacks.

The commission's final report also offered new evidence of increased contact between Iran and al-Qaeda. The report contains information about how "at least eight" of the 9/11 hijackers passed through Iran, and indicates that officials in Iran did not place entry stamps in their passports. However, according to the report (Chapter 7), there is no evidence that Iran was aware of the actual 9/11 plot.

The commission report chose to place blame for failure to notify the military squarely upon the Federal Aviation Administration (FAA). Ben Sliney, FAA operations manager at Herndon, Virginia, and Monte Belger, FAA acting deputy administrator on 9/11, both stated to the commission that military liaisons were present and participating in Herndon's response as the events of 9/11 unfolded. Sliney stated that everyone who needed to be notified, including the military, was.

In addition to its findings, the report made extensive recommendations for changes that can be made to help prevent a similar attack. These include the creation of a National Intelligence Director over both the CIA and the FBI, and many changes in border security and immigration policy.

=== Public diplomacy and war on terror ===
The 9/11 Commission Report stated that "long-term success demands the use of all the elements of national power: diplomacy, intelligence, covert action, law enforcement, economic policy, foreign aid, public diplomacy, and homeland defense." Quantitative numbers alone would not defeat the terrorists and insurgents, the report stated. The objectives of defeating the enemy needed to be specific enough so that the public could determine whether the goals were being met. The 9/11 Commission Report emphasized that in order to defeat an insurgency, one needed to promote a stronger ideology, value system, and security environment, than the opposition. The 9/11 Commission also emphasized the use of public diplomacy. Furthermore, the report stated that defeating insurgents and terrorists "is not based on traditional war tactics, but encompasses a national strategic effort that employs all elements of national power."

In 2003, the U.S. government began to prioritize political and cultural support for the counterinsurgency efforts in Afghanistan. An Afghan regional official claimed that Afghanistan was on the right track for a stable government and begged the United States not to leave the theater, claiming that Afghanistan would lose progress if the U.S. withdrew their political support and local outreach to the public.

According to the 9/11 Commission, conducting public diplomacy with the local population of Afghanistan was necessary for long-term success within the country. The report stated that, "A former under secretary of the state for public diplomacy and both chairmen of the 9/11 Commission expressed the view that public diplomacy tools are at least as important in the war on terrorism as military tools and should be given equal state and increased funding."

The 9/11 Commission stated that the United States envisioned an eventual Afghan government that was able to build a national army, coordinate infrastructure, and coordinate public services in major provinces throughout the country. The 9/11 Commission also suggested an increased effort in the U.S. State Department and the international community to "become involved with the rule of law and to contain the rampant crime and narcotics trafficking in the area." However, in order to carry out these long-term goals the U.S. should rely on civilian-military teams to reach out to the local population and listen to their concerns and implement them with the Afghan government effectively, the report stated.

At the time of the release of The 9/11 Commission Report, there was a strong realization that negative public opinion about the U.S. could directly relate to how friendly countries in the Middle East would be in the war on terror, mainly in Afghanistan. At the time, American involvement in the Middle East had not been accepted well; support for the United States had plummeted. The 9/11 Commission showed that favorable ratings for the United States had fallen from 61 to 15 percent in Indonesia and from 71 to 38 percent among Muslims in Nigeria. It also stated that many disgruntled views about the U.S. developed from uninformed minds about America and that they were distorted by cartoon ideologies. Local newspapers in Middle Eastern countries that reinforced the Jihadist theme, portraying the U.S. as anti-Muslim, "influenced these fragile views", the reports stressed. These ideas needed to be effectively countered in order to win the U.S. counterinsurgency efforts in Afghanistan and the ideological war against Muslim extremism.

The commission claimed that it was possible, through the use of public diplomacy, to drive a wedge between moderate Muslims and the violent terrorists or insurgents. It also stressed the need for the United States to stand for a better future and act as a role model to the local population in Afghanistan and to the Muslim community. The U.S. needed to take the moral leadership role in Afghanistan and throughout the world. For parents, insurgents in Afghanistan could only offer their children violence and death, the commission claimed. The U.S. should utilize public diplomacy to counter the insurgent ideology.

The 9/11 Commission also claimed that American values and ideals were something that the Muslim population could connect to, agree with, and feel secure with. The commission advised that the U.S. stands up for its values and ideals to prevent the insurgents from distorting the ideology of liberty to persuade the Muslim world into the insurgent or terrorist ideology. Only through use of public diplomacy could the U.S. counter these political and ideological distortions, the commission claimed. And thus explaining and making clear the U.S. stance on morality, freedom, and liberty to the local populations in the Middle East would allow the U.S. to promote the American counterinsurgency effort in Afghanistan.

The 9/11 Commission also elaborated on the example of humane treatment of prisoners of war, stating that the U.S. and its allies needed to project a higher image of morality by the civil and humane treatment of terrorists that were captured to the local populations of countries like Afghanistan. Accusations that the U.S. abused its prisoners made it more difficult to win political, social, and diplomatic relations in its civilian-military operations in Afghanistan. Without careful prevention of derogatory use of information by the enemy, the United States would become a victim of the enemy's use of public diplomacy in war, the report stated.

The 9/11 Commission believed that public diplomacy should be viewed as a dialogue with Arab populations, to enable a greater understanding between cultures and societies and to build those long-term relationships and trust that was needed to be successful at counterinsurgency warfare. "If we don't have long-term relationships with Muslim populations, we cannot have trust. Without trust, public diplomacy is ineffective."

== Criticism ==
In a 2004 article titled, "Whitewash as Public Service: How the 9/11 Commission Report Defrauds the Nation", Harper's Magazine writer Benjamin DeMott wrote:

The plain, sad reality—I report this following four full days studying the work—is that The 9/11 Commission Report, despite the vast quantity of labor behind it, is a cheat and a fraud. It stands as a series of evasive maneuvers that infantilize the audience, transform candor into iniquity, and conceal realities that demand immediate inspection and confrontation. Because it is continuously engaged in scotching all attempts to distinguish better from worse leadership responses, the Commission can't discharge its duty to educate the audience about the habits of mind and temperament essential in those chosen to discharge command responsibility during crises.

Other sources have criticized the commission for not digging deep enough to get to the core of the issues. In a 2004 interview with Bernard Gwertzman of the Council on Foreign Relations, Anthony H. Cordesman of the Center for Strategic and International Studies in Washington, D.C., said:

Again, one of the great problems in the commission report is that it looked at exactly one issue—counterterrorism—and none of the others. But [U.S.] intelligence users consist of more than one million people, many of them in uniform, and when you talk about budgeting and programming authority, you have to consider that.... Many of these conclusions are probably very valuable. But this is a 13-chapter report. Eleven chapters are a masterful description of what happened and what went wrong that led to the 9/11 attack. There is no chapter that explains what people did after 9/11. There is no chapter that qualifies that this is only one of many problems in intelligence and intelligence reform."

FAA counterterrorism expert Bogdan Dzakovic believes that the security failures at airports that allowed the hijackers to board the planes were not due to the failures in the system that the report identified. Furthermore, he stated that "Many of the FAA bureaucrats that actively thwarted improvements in security prior to 9/11 have been promoted by FAA or the Transportation Security Administration." The report did not mention his name, despite Dzakovic giving the following testimony to the commission regarding his undercover checks on airport security prior to 9/11:

We breached security up to 90 percent of the time. The FAA suppressed these warnings. Instead, we were ordered not to write up our reports and not to retest airports where we found particularly egregious vulnerabilities, to see if the problems had been fixed. Finally, the agency started providing advance notification of when we would be conducting our "undercover" tests and what we would be "checking."... What happened on 9/11 was not a failure in the system. Our airports are not safer now than before 9/11. The main difference between then and now is that life is now more miserable for passengers.

The report has been accused of not giving the whole story about the warnings the U.S. received prior to the attacks. While the report did describe that "the system was blinking red" and that an al-Qaeda attack was imminent, it did not include the testimony of former CIA director George Tenet to the commission in January 2004, in which he claimed to have given a specific warning to the Administration in a July 2001 meeting with National Security Advisor Condoleezza Rice. Commission members Thomas Kean and Lee Hamilton stated that they had not been told about the meeting. But the Boston Globe reported that "it turns out that the panel was, in fact, told about the meeting, according to the interview transcript and Democratic commission member Richard Ben-Veniste, who sat in on the interview with Tenet."

In July 2024, over 200 exhibits were unsealed in federal court, including a video filmed by Saudi intelligence service operative Omar al-Bayoumi in 1999. Bayoumi, whom the FBI linked to two 9/11 hijackers, was pointing out the locations of several Washington D.C. landmarks like the U.S. Capitol. Brett Eagleson, president of 9/11 Justice, said on CNN that the 9/11 Commission had not seen this video when it concluded that the Saudi government had not been involved in planning the attacks. Eagleson said his organization therefore considered the 9/11 Commission report "null and void."

== Literary praise ==
The 9/11 Commission Report garnered praise in some quarters for its literary qualities. In 2004, Richard Posner, writing for The New York Times, praised it as "uncommonly lucid, even riveting" and called it "an improbable literary triumph." The report rose to the top of several bestseller lists, and became one of the best-selling government reports of all time. Also in 2004, the National Book Foundation named The 9/11 Commission Report a finalist in its National Book Awards' non-fiction category.

== Translations ==
Kazusada Sumiyama (住山 一貞, Sumiyama Kazusada), father of September 11 victim Yoichi Sugiyama (杉山 陽一, Sugiyama Yōichi), translated the report into Japanese, with the title "9/11レポート: 2001年米国同時多発テロ調査委員会報告書". Sumiyama took about ten years to create his translation. It was published by Korocolor Publishers (出版社ころから), which then used a crowdfunding program to recoup the costs of the translation.

== Adaptations ==
In 2006, The 9/11 Commission Report, a straight-to-DVD movie, was released by The Asylum. It is based on the findings of the original 9/11 Commission Reports, although it does fictionalize some elements. The report inspired a controversial television miniseries, The Path to 9/11. Dramatizing many specific scenes in the report, it is a synthesis of multiple (and in some cases partisan) sources in addition to the report itself. The 9/11 Report: A Graphic Adaptation (ISBN 0-8090-5739-5), by Sid Jacobson and Ernie Colón, and published by Hill & Wang, is an abridged graphic novel adaptation of the report. On Native Soil is a documentary of The 9/11 Commission Report narrated by Kevin Costner and Hilary Swank. In 2006, director Paul Greengrass adapted portions of The 9/11 Commission Report chronicling the events of United Airlines Flight 93 into the two-time Academy Award-nominated film United 93. Select testimonies of the report were adapted as a flash-forward storytelling device in Hulu's 2018 miniseries The Looming Tower.

== See also ==
- 9/11 Public Discourse Project
- US Congressional Inquiry

Similar attacks

- Pacific Air Lines Flight 773 – 1964 cockpit attack (resulted in 44 deaths)
- Federal Express Flight 705 – 1994 cockpit attack
- Operation Bojinka – plot by Ramzi Yousef and Khalid Shaikh Mohammed, foiled in 1995, to, in part, attack multiple airliners and crash a plane into the CIA headquarters
- Southwest Airlines Flight 1763 – August 2000 cockpit attack

Media

- Debt of Honor – 1994 Tom Clancy novel where a 747 is crashed into the U.S. Capitol
- Executive Decision – 1996 Kurt Russell movie where a 747 is used as a weapon targeting Washington, D.C.
