= Joint Inquiry into Intelligence Community Activities before and after the Terrorist Attacks of September 11, 2001 =

Report

The Joint Inquiry into Intelligence Community Activities before and after the Terrorist Attacks of September 11, 2001, is the official name of the inquiry conducted by the Senate Select Committee on Intelligence and the House Permanent Select Committee on Intelligence into the activities of the U.S. Intelligence Community in connection with the attacks of September 11, 2001. The investigation began in February 2002 and the final report was released in December 2002.

== Calls for inquiry ==
The White House, Senator Bob Graham (D-Fla.), chair of the Select Committee on Intelligence, and Representative Porter Goss (R-Fla.), chair of the House Intelligence Committee, originally rebuffed calls for an inquiry following the September 11 attacks. After December 2001, initial resolutions in the Senate called for the establishment of an independent bipartisan commission. The joint inquiry was announced February 14, 2002, with Senator Graham saying it would not play "the blame game about what went wrong from an intelligence perspective", and Representative Goss saying, "This particular effort focuses on the broader issues of terrorism worldwide, our capacity to counter terrorist activities and our preparedness to protect the American people at home and abroad."

== Investigation ==
Senator Graham and Representative Goss, accompanied by their respective committee ranking minority members, Republican Senator Richard Shelby and Democratic Representative Nancy Pelosi, led the joint inquiry. L. Britt Snider, the former inspector general of the CIA, was staff director. He hired a 30-person investigative staff to gather evidence and interview Central Intelligence Agency, Federal Bureau of Investigation and other intelligence and law enforcement agencies.

However, the committee quickly ran into stonewalling, delays and attacks from Vice President Dick Cheney and United States Secretary of Defense Donald Rumsfeld, especially after an alleged leak from the committee. CNN had reported classified information that the National Security Agency had received warning of the attacks on September 10 but failed to translate and forward them. Staff director L. Britt Snider was pressured to resign in April 2002 because of questions about whether one or more of his hires had lacked proper clearance to view classified material.

The Washington Post reported in May 2002 that Representative Goss dismissed as "a lot of nonsense" reports that five weeks before the attacks a CIA briefing had alerted President Bush about possible Osama bin Laden associates' plans to highjack aircraft; he said the investigation focus would be on why the United States intelligence bureaucracy composed of 13 agencies failed to detect the hijackers. Senator Graham said the question was why wasn't the intelligence precise. Critics on and off of Capitol Hill complained that Goss was too aligned with the CIA and Graham was insufficiently assertive.

In August 2002 unnamed individuals who had read the report revealed it contained accusations of links between the government of Saudi Arabia and the attacks. The Saudis denied this and asked that the section be made public, but President Bush refused. In December 2002 Senator Graham himself revealed in a PBS interview that "I was surprised at the evidence that there were foreign governments involved in facilitating the activities of at least some of the terrorists in the United States."

== The report ==
The joint inquiry released their findings in December 2002. The 832-page report (available as both S. Rept. 107-351 and H. Rept. 107-792) presents the joint inquiry’s findings and conclusions, an accompanying narrative, and a series of recommendations. The critical and comprehensive report detailed failings of the FBI and CIA to use available information, including about terrorists the CIA knew were in the United States, in order to disrupt the plots.

=== Redacted sections ===
The 28 pages refers to a small section at the end of the inquiry commission report on the September 11 attacks that includes the details of foreign state sponsor support for al-Qaeda prior to the attack and the possible Saudi connection with the terrorists. This part of the congressional report was classified by the George W. Bush administration. Since then, attempts were made to declassify the redacted pages by senators and political activists, among them former chairman of the Senate Intelligence Committee and the co-chairman of the joint congressional panel, Bob Graham. United States' intelligence agencies declassified the pages, and Congress publicly released the pages with some parts redacted on July 15, 2016.

== Aftermath ==
September 11 victim families were frustrated by the unanswered questions and redacted material and demanded an independent commission. In late 2002, President George W. Bush and Congress established the 9/11 Commission, an independent bipartisan commission charged with investigating the September 11 attacks.

In 2004, Senator Graham released his book Intelligence Matters: The CIA, the FBI, Saudi Arabia, and the Failure of America's War on Terror that dealt with issues raised by the investigation. In April 2016, both co-chairmen of the Inquiry, Bob Graham and Porter Goss, later director of the CIA, as well as other former U.S. officials, who are familiar with the entire text of the joint inquiry′s report, aired their belief that the U.S. government was persisting in its coverup on the Saudi Arabian government officials′ substantial aid provided to the perpetrators of the 9/11 attack and urged the Obama administration to declassify the bowdlerized pages of the report. A bipartisan effort led by Walter Jones and Stephen Lynch to make the document fully available to the public resulted in publication of the 28 pages on July 15, 2016.

In 2015, efforts began in the U.S. Senate to pass a bill that would allow victims to sue foreign powers that fund terrorist groups, such as Al Qaeda, to kill Americans on American soil. This bill became law on September 28, 2016, as the Justice Against Sponsors of Terrorism Act.
