= September 11 attacks =

2001 terror attacks in the United States

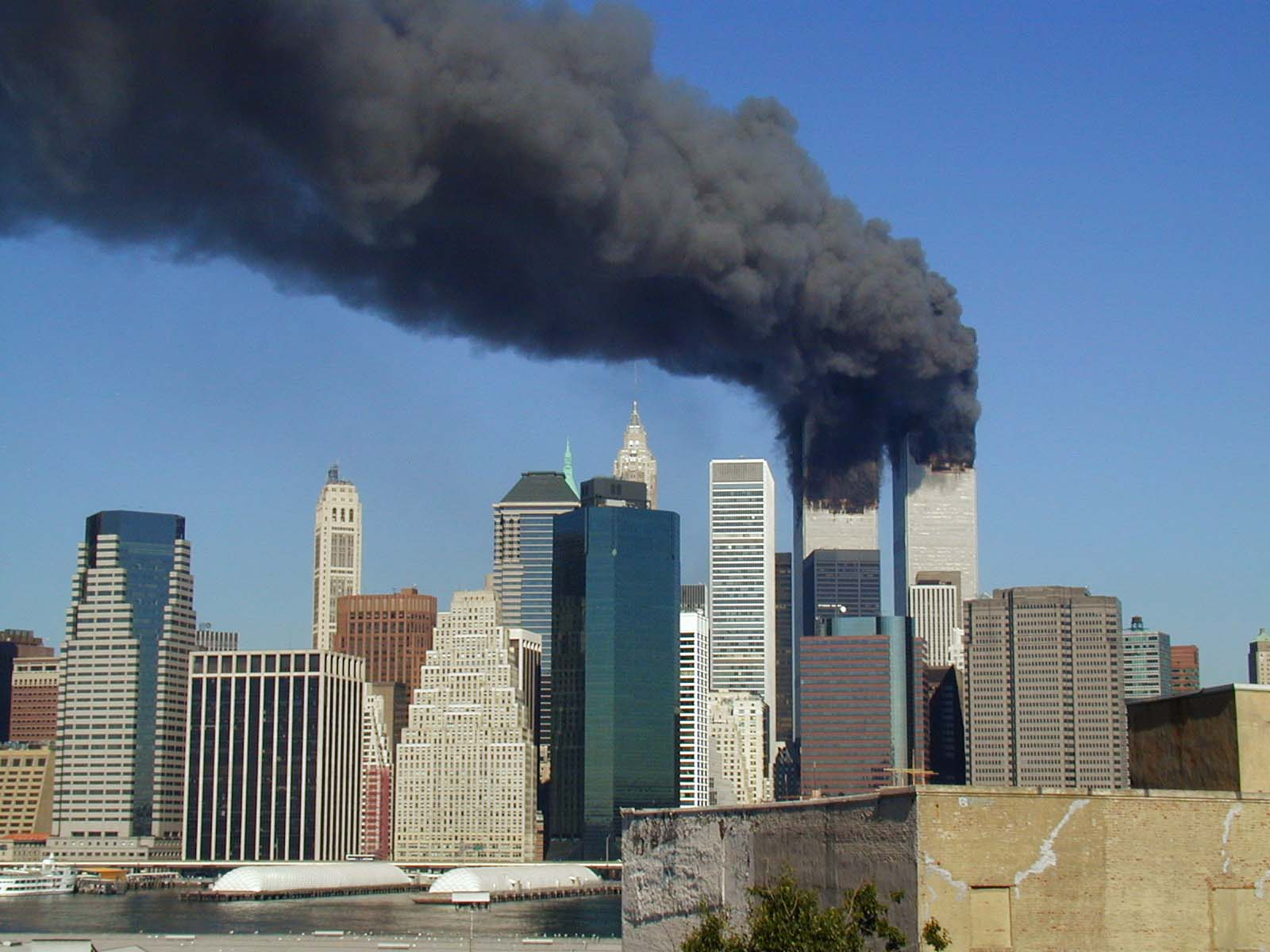
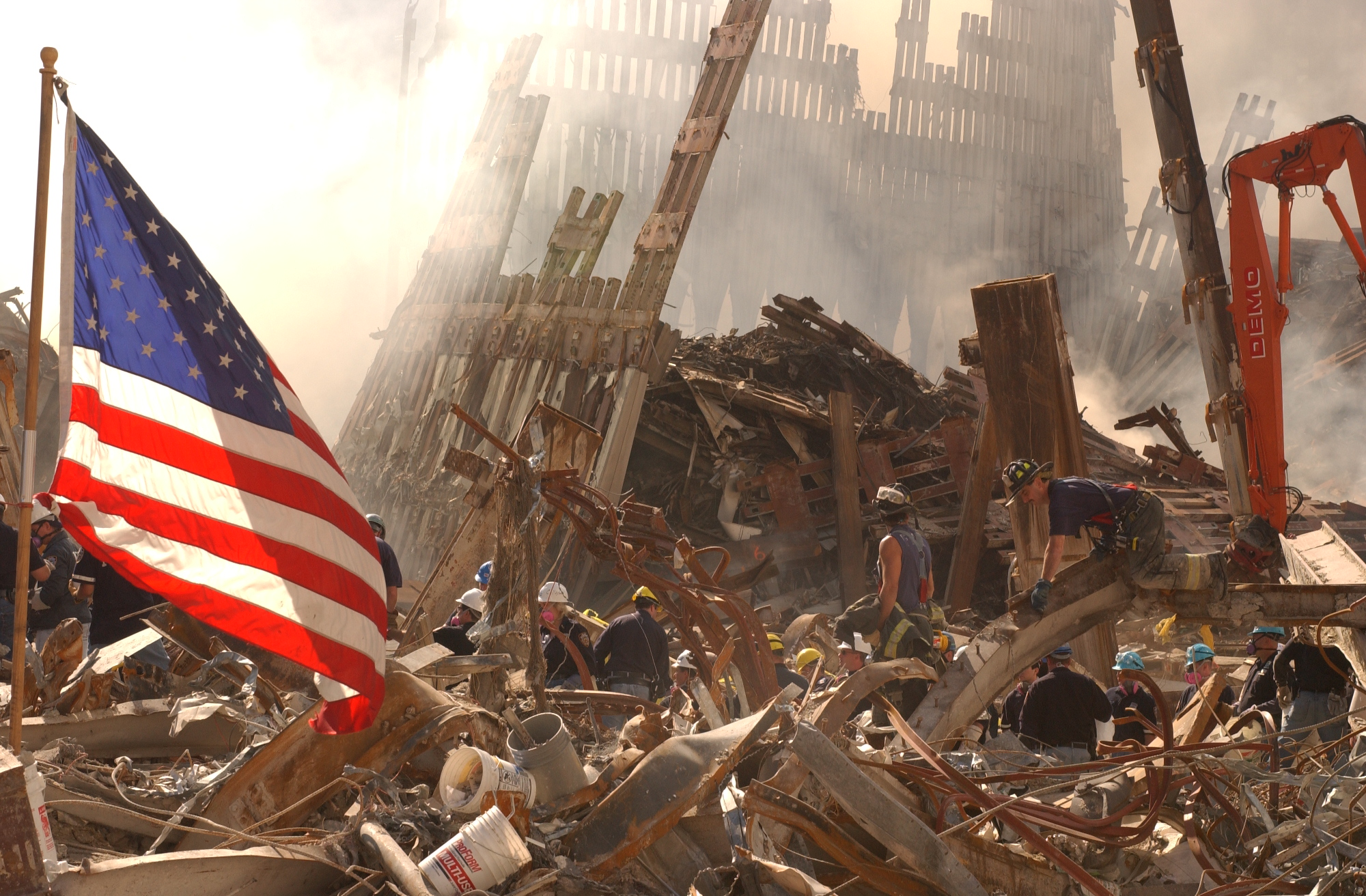
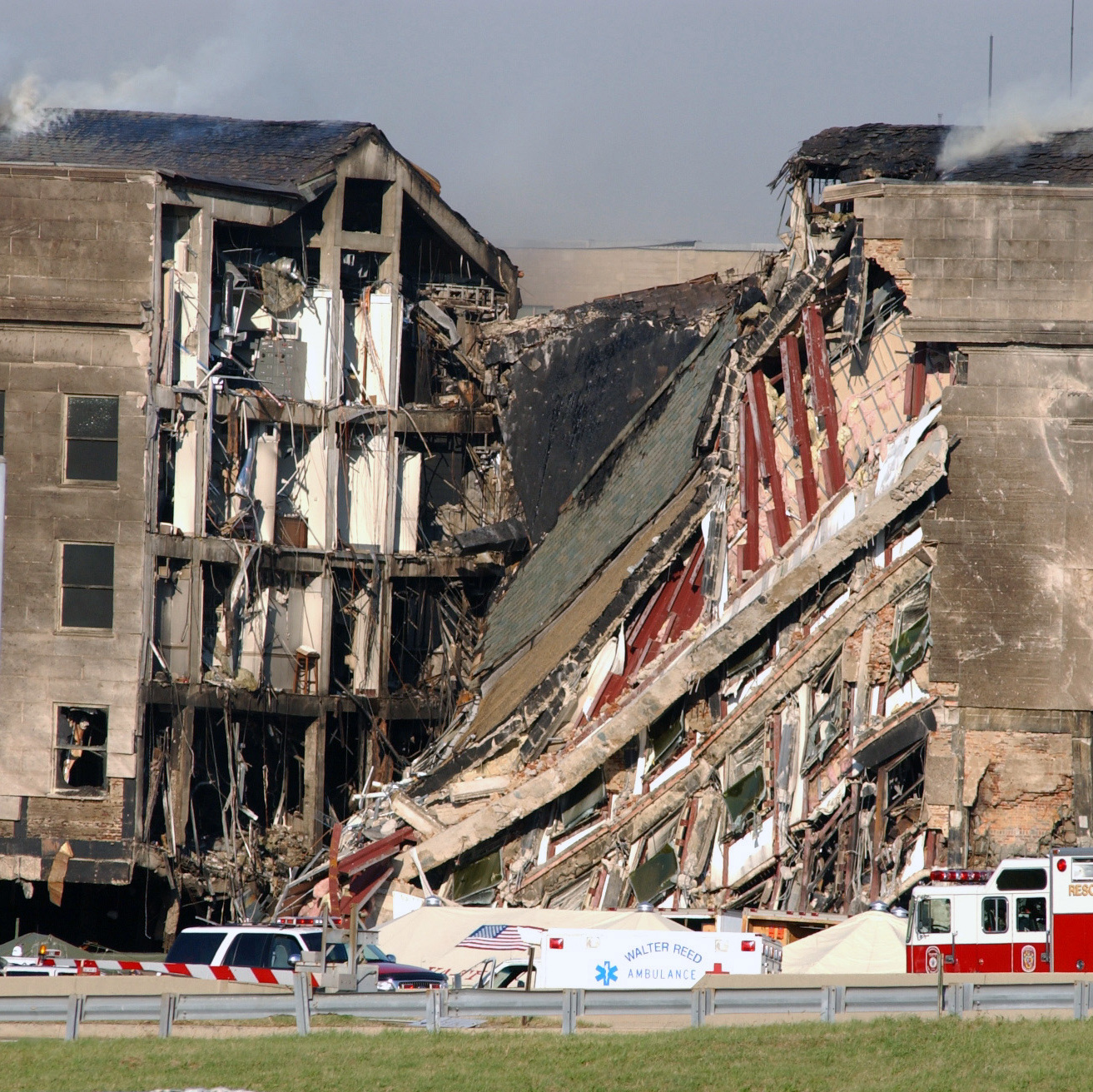
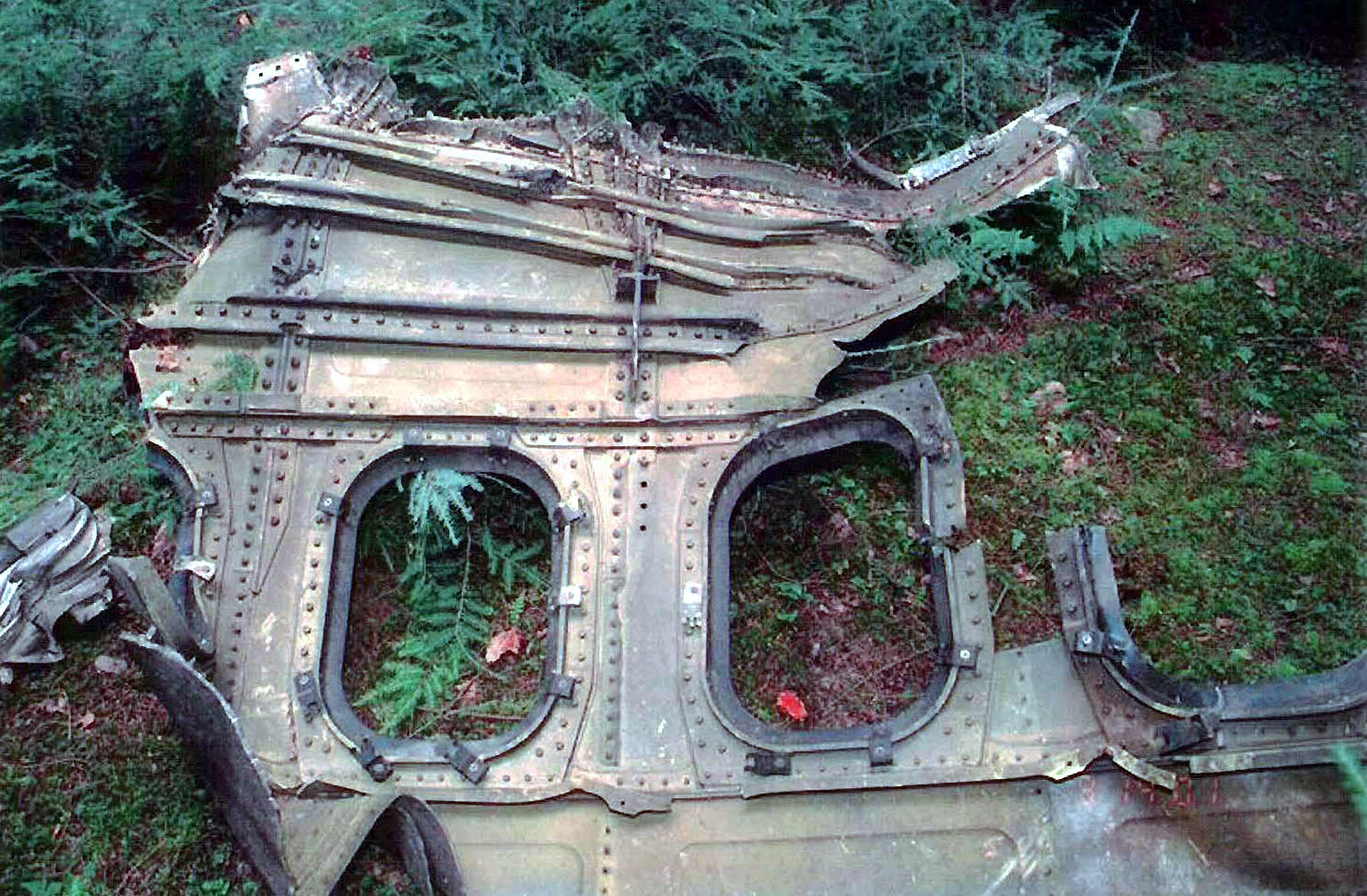
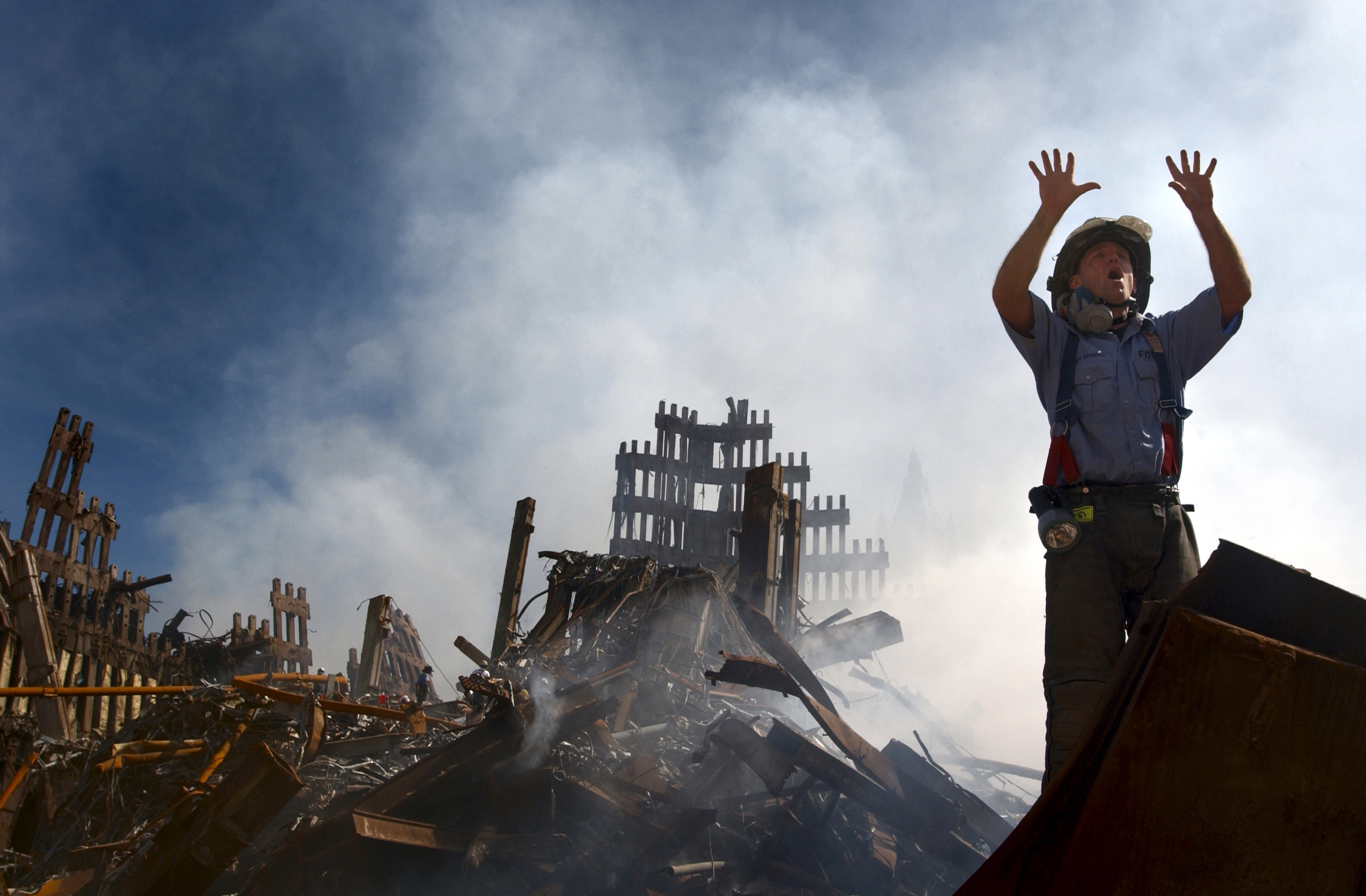
- From top, left to right: The Twin Towers burning; Rescue workers at Ground Zero; Collapsed section of the Pentagon; Fragment of the Flight 93 fuselage; A firefighter at Ground Zero
- Location: Financial District, Lower Manhattan, New York; Arlington County, Virginia; Stonycreek Township, Pennsylvania (Note: Other, secondary attack locations include the airspaces of Massachusetts, New Jersey, Ohio, Kentucky and West Virginia.)
- Date: September 11, 2001; 25 years ago
- Target: World Trade Center (AA 11 and UA 175); The Pentagon (AA 77); U.S. Capitol Building or the White House (UA 93; unsuccessful due to passenger revolt)
- Attack type: Islamic terrorism; aircraft hijacking; suicide attack; mass murder
- Deaths: 12,000+ total: 2,996 in the attacks (2,977 victims and 19 hijackers); 9,000+ estimated to have died of health issues related to the attacks
- Injuries: 6,000–25,000+ (Note: Sources vary regarding the number of injuries―some say 6,000 while others go as high as 25,000.)
- Perpetrators: Al-Qaeda led by Osama bin Laden; The Hamburg cell (see also: responsibility)
- No. of participants: 19
- Motive: Several; see Motives for the September 11 attacks and fatwas of Osama bin Laden
- Accused: Khalid Sheikh Mohammed
- Convicted: Zacarias Moussaoui; Imad Yarkas; Mounir el-Motassadeq (see also: Trials related to the September 11 attacks)

The September 11 attacks, (Note: Al-Qaeda's name for the events is the Manhattan Raid; an example, perhaps the earliest known or knowable example, is found in a September 2006–produced video.) colloquially known as 9/11, (Note: Pronounced "nine eleven") were a coordinated series of suicide attacks perpetrated by the Islamic terrorist organization al-Qaeda against the United States in 2001. A total of 19 hijackers commandeered four commercial passenger airliners. The first two planes were flown into each of the Twin Towers at the World Trade Center in New York City, while the third plane crashed into the Pentagon, the headquarters of the United States Department of Defense, in Arlington County, Virginia. The fourth plane crashed in a rural field in Pennsylvania during a passenger revolt. The United States responded by invading Afghanistan, Iraq, and other countries, which is called the "Global War on Terror".

The ringleader, Mohamed Atta, flew American Airlines Flight 11 into the North Tower of the World Trade Center at 8:46 a.m. At 9:03 a.m. (Note: The exact time is disputed. The 9/11 Commission Report states that Flight 175 struck the South Tower at 09:03:11 a.m., NIST reports 09:02:59 a.m., and some other sources claim 09:03:02 a.m. In any case, the 16-minute gap between each impact is rounded to 17.) Marwan al-Shehhi flew United Airlines Flight 175 into the South Tower. Both collapsed within an hour and forty-two minutes, (Note: While NIST and the 9/11 Commission give differing accounts of the exact second of the North Tower's collapse initiation, with NIST placing it at 10:28:22 a.m. and the commission at 10:28:25 a.m., it is generally accepted that Flight 11 did not strike the North Tower any sooner than 8:46:26 a.m., so the time it took for the North Tower to start to collapse was just shy of 102 minutes either way.) destroying the remaining five structures in the complex. Hani Hanjour flew American Airlines Flight 77 into the Pentagon at 9:37 a.m., causing a partial collapse. United Airlines Flight 93, hijacked by Ziad Jarrah, was believed to target either the United States Capitol or the White House. Alerted to the previous attacks, the passengers revolted and the hijackers crashed the aircraft into a field near Shanksville, Pennsylvania, at 10:03 a.m. The Federal Aviation Administration ordered a ground stop for all traffic in U.S. airspace, requiring all airborne aircraft to return to their point of origin or divert to Canada. The actions undertaken in Canada to support incoming aircraft and their occupants were collectively titled Operation Yellow Ribbon.

That evening, the Central Intelligence Agency informed President George W. Bush that its Counterterrorism Center had identified the attacks as having been the work of al-Qaeda under Osama bin Laden. The United States responded by invading Afghanistan and launching its Global War on Terror, with the stated goal of eliminating hostile groups it deemed terrorist organizations and the governments the United States identified as supporting them. NATO's invocation of Article 5 of the North Atlantic Treaty—its only usage to date—called upon allies to fight al-Qaeda as well. As U.S. and allied invasion forces swept through Afghanistan, bin Laden eluded them. He denied any involvement until 2004, when excerpts of a taped statement in which he accepted responsibility for the attacks were released. Al-Qaeda's cited motivations included U.S. support of Israel, the presence of U.S. military bases in Saudi Arabia, and sanctions against Iraq. The nearly decade-long manhunt for bin Laden concluded in May 2011, when he was killed during a U.S. military raid in Abbottabad, Pakistan. The war in Afghanistan continued for another decade.

The attacks killed 2,977 people, injured thousands more, (Note: Excluding the hijackers) and gave rise to long-term health consequences while causing at least US$10 billion in infrastructure and property damage. It remains the deadliest terrorist attack in history, as well as the deadliest incident for firefighters and law enforcement personnel in American history, killing 343 and 72 members, respectively. The crashes of Flight 11 and Flight 175 were the deadliest aviation disasters of all time, and the collision of Flight 77 with the Pentagon resulted in the fourth-highest number of ground fatalities in a plane crash in history. The destruction of the World Trade Center and its environs seriously harmed the U.S. economy and induced global market shocks. Many other countries tightened airport security, strengthened anti-terrorism legislation and expanded their powers of law enforcement and intelligence agencies. The total number of deaths caused by the attacks, combined with the death tolls from the conflicts they directly triggered, has been estimated by the Costs of War Project to be more than 4.5 million.

Cleanup of the World Trade Center site (colloquially known as "Ground Zero") was completed in May 2002, while the Pentagon was repaired within a year. After delays in the design of a replacement complex, six new buildings were planned to replace the lost towers at the World Trade Center site, along with a museum and memorial dedicated to those who were killed or injured in the attacks. The tallest building, One World Trade Center, began construction in 2006 and opened in 2014. Memorials to the attacks include the National September 11 Memorial & Museum in New York City; the Pentagon Memorial in Arlington County, Virginia; and the Flight 93 National Memorial at the Pennsylvania crash site.

== Background ==
=== Osama bin Laden ===
In 1996, Osama bin Laden, leading the jihadist organization al-Qaeda, issued his first fatwa, which declared jihad against the United States and demanded expulsion of all American troops stationed in Arabia. Bin Laden interpreted Muhammad as banning non-Muslims from Arabia. He thus considered the U.S. troop presence a provocation to all Muslims. Regarding his holy war, bin Laden stated, "We do not differentiate between those dressed in military uniforms, and civilians; they are all targets of this fatwa."

Bin Laden was living in Sudan prior to 1996. When the Sudanese government exiled him after Saudi and U.S. pressure, bin Laden returned to Afghanistan, which was run by the Taliban. They allowed al-Qaeda to use the country as its base of operations. He then orchestrated the 9/11 attacks on the U.S. He personally told his participants to target the World Trade Center and the Pentagon with hijacked planes. He initially denied his role in the attacks, but later recanted his denial.

U.S. forces recovered a videotape in which bin Laden, talking to Khaled al-Harbi, admitted foreknowledge of the attacks. In a 2004 video, he confirmed that he had organized 9/11. A video by Al Jazeera in 2006 shows bin Laden with one of the attacks' chief planners, Ramzi bin al-Shibh, as well as hijackers Hamza al-Ghamdi and Wail al-Shehri.

==== Motives ====
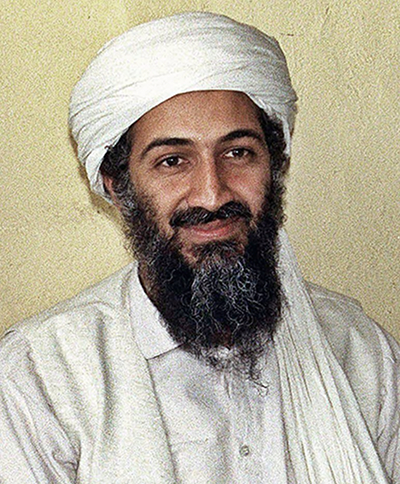
Osama bin Laden

Bin Laden's 1996 fatwa, in addition to similar statements that called for the killing of Americans, are seen by investigators as evidence of his motivation for the attacks. In a second fatwa in 1998, he outlined more of his objections to American foreign policy, such as American support of Israel and the U.S. and other nations' sanctions against Iraq, condemning the "protracted blockade." He claimed that the U.S. was being directed by an international Jewish conspiracy into killing as many Muslims as possible, and that all Muslims must wage a defensive war against the U.S. This was to be done until the aggression against them ceased. Bin Laden further claimed it would send a message to the American people, forcing the U.S. to reevaluate its policies. In a 1998 interview with American journalist John Miller, he stated:

American history does not distinguish between civilians and military, not even women and children. They are the ones who used [a nuclear bomb] against Nagasaki. Can these bombs distinguish between infants and military? America does not have a religion that will prevent it from destroying all people. So we tell the Americans as people [...] that if they value their lives and the lives of their children, to find a nationalist government that will look after their interests and not the interests of the Jews.

After 9/11, bin Laden maintained that women and children were not targeted in the attack—rather, symbols of America's "economic and military power." In December 2001, a video of bin Laden was released in which he did not admit responsibility for 9/11, but instead said:

It has become clear that the West in general and America in particular have an unspeakable hatred for Islam. [...] It is the hatred of crusaders. Terrorism against America deserves to be praised because it was a response to injustice, aimed at forcing America to stop its support for Israel, which kills our people. [...] We say that the end of the United States is imminent, whether bin Laden or his followers are alive or dead, for the awakening of the Muslim ummah [nation] has occurred. [...] It is important to hit the economy [of the U.S.], which is the base of its military power... If the economy is hit, they will become reoccupied.

In a 2002 manifesto, he listed multiple factors implied to have motivated 9/11, including U.S. support of Israel against Lebanon during their occupation of Southern Lebanon and Palestinians during the Second Intifada, support of the Philippines against Muslim militants, support of Russia against Muslim militants, and support of India against Muslim civilians in Kashmir. He also listed the former U.S.-led intervention against Muslim militants in Somalia, pollution caused by the U.S., and the U.S.' refusal to ratify the Kyoto Protocol. (Note: * Bergen (2001), p. 3: "US pulls out of Saudi Arabia". BBC News. April 29, 2003. Archived from the original on December 25, 2018.; "Full transcript of bin Ladin's speech". Al Jazeera. November 1, 2004. Archived from the original on January 1, 2016.; Mearsheimer (2007), p. 67; Murdico (2003), p. 64; Kelley (2006), p. 207; Ibrahim & bin Laden (2007), p. 276; Berner (2007), p. 80; Moench, Mallory; Shah, Simmone (November 16, 2023). "Why Osama bin Laden's 'Letter to America' Went Viral on TikTok". Time. Archived from the original on November 17, 2023.; Tolentino, Daysia (November 17, 2023). "TikTok removes hashtag for Osama bin Laden's 'Letter to America' after viral videos circulate". NBC News. Archived from the original on November 17, 2023.; Bergen, Peter (September 23, 2006). "What were the causes of 9/11?". Prospect. ISSN 2059-6731. Archived from the original on December 13, 2025.; "Full text: bin Laden's 'letter to America'". The Guardian. London. November 24, 2002. ISSN 1756-3224. Archived from the original on April 18, 2010.) In the 2004 video, he said he was inspired to destroy the World Trade Center's Twin Towers after watching the destruction of towers in Lebanon by Israel during the 1982 Lebanon War.

"God knows it did not cross our minds to attack the towers, but after [witnessing] [...] the destroyed towers in Lebanon, it occurred to me [to] punish the unjust the same way: to destroy towers in America, so it could taste some of what we are tasting, and to stop killing our children and women."

Other motives have been suggested in addition to those stated by him and other al-Qaeda members. Some authors suggested the "humiliation" that resulted from the Islamic world falling behind the Western world—this discrepancy was rendered especially visible by globalization—as well as a desire to provoke the U.S. into a broader war against the Islamic world in the hope of motivating more allies to support al-Qaeda. Similarly, others have argued the 9/11 attacks were a strategic move to provoke America into a war that would incite a pan-Islamic revolution.

=== Khalid Sheikh Mohammed and other al-Qaeda members ===
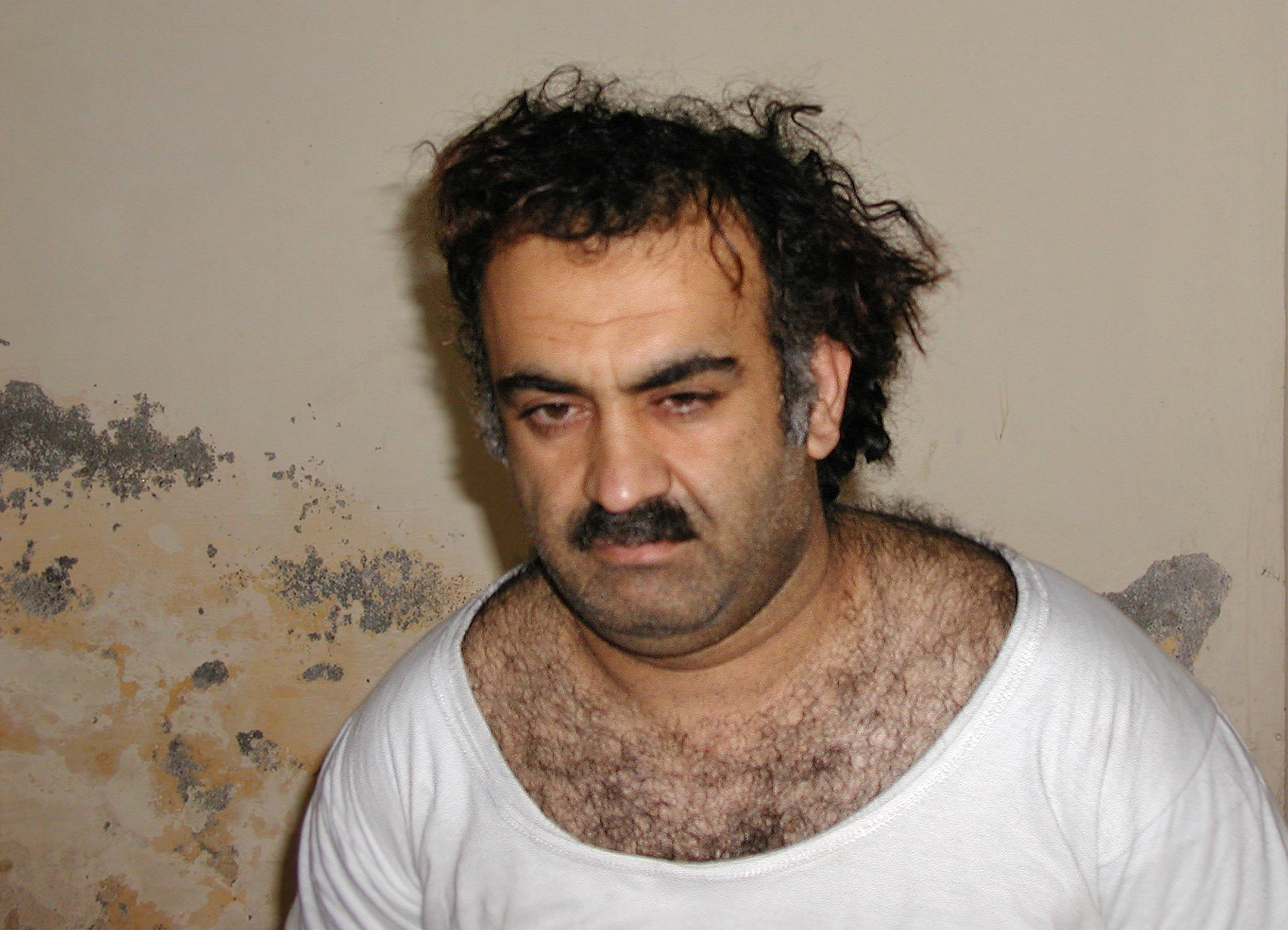
Khalid Sheikh Mohammed after his 2003 capture in Rawalpindi, Pakistan

In April 2002, Yosri Fouda of Al Jazeera met al-Qaeda member Khalid Sheikh Mohammed and bin al-Shibh, who were in hiding, and they admitted to him their involvement in the attacks. Mohammed had been an organizer and financier of al-Qaeda's 1993 bombing of the World Trade Center, and he was the uncle of Ramzi Yousef, the lead bomber in that attack. Mohammed and Yousef planned another terrorist attack, the Bojinka plot, for January 1995. Despite its failure, and Yousef's imprisonment by the U.S. afterwards, the plot would influence the later September 11 attacks. The 2004 9/11 Commission Report determined that the animosity that Mohammed, the principal architect of 9/11, felt towards the U.S. had stemmed from his "violent disagreement with U.S. foreign policy favoring Israel."

=== Planning ===
Documents seized during the 2011 operation that killed bin Laden included notes handwritten by bin Laden in September 2002 with the heading "The Birth of the Idea of September 11." He describes how he was inspired by the crash of EgyptAir Flight 990 in October 1999, which was deliberately crashed by co-pilot Gameel Al-Batouti, killing more than 200 passengers. "This is how the idea of 9/11 was conceived and developed in my head, and that is when we began the planning" bin Laden continued, adding that no one but Mohammed Atef and Abu al-Khair knew about it at the time. The 9/11 Commission Report identified Khalid Sheikh Mohammed as the architect of 9/11, but he is not mentioned in bin Laden's notes.

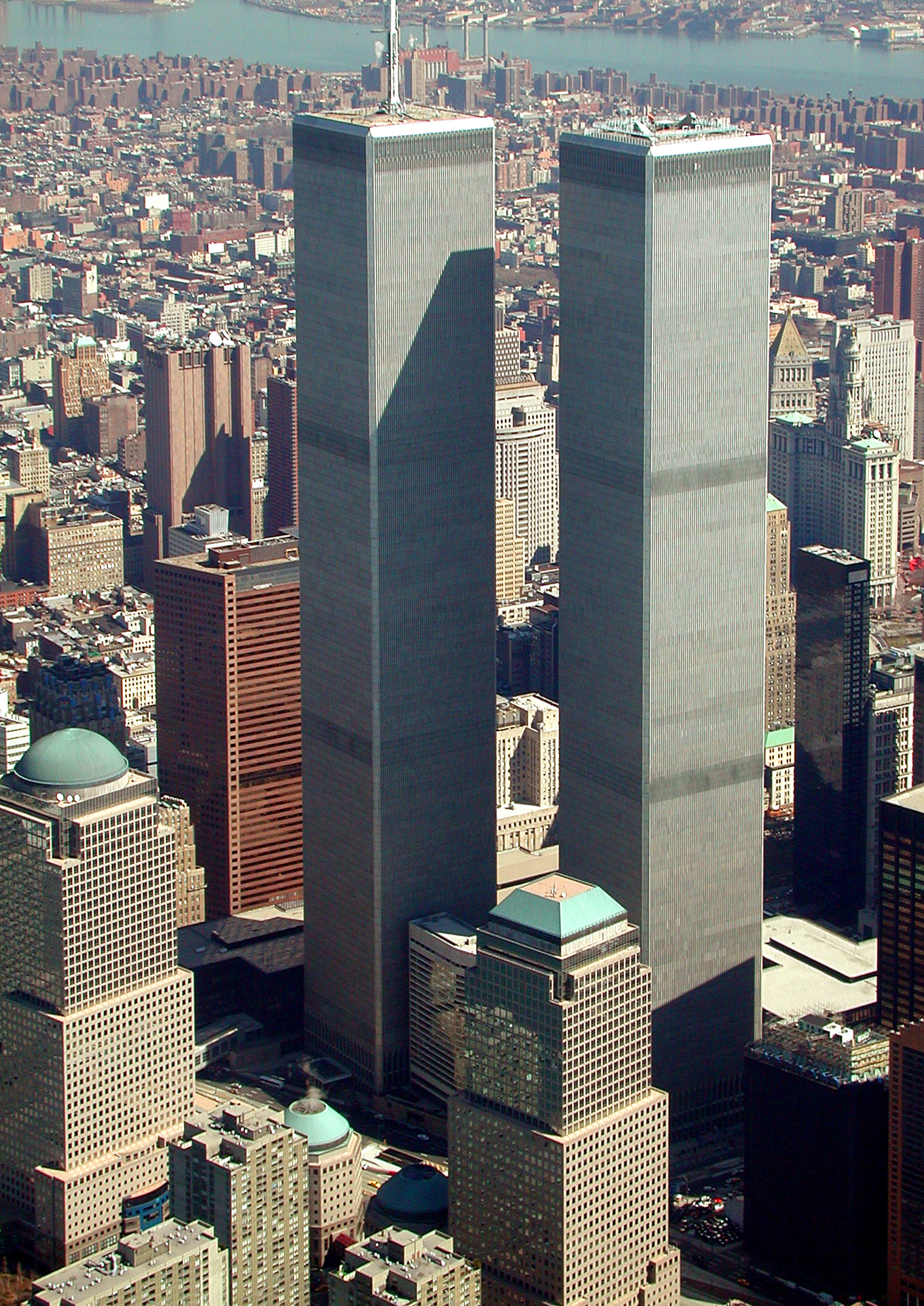
The twin towers of the original World Trade Center complex as seen in March 2001

During the trial of alleged 9/11 conspirator Zacarias Moussaoui, the U.S. government identified five people as having been completely aware of the operation's details; bin Laden, Mohammed, Mohammed Atef, Abu Turab al-Urduni, and bin al-Shibh. The attacks were conceived by Khalid Sheikh Mohammed, who first presented it to bin Laden in 1996. Many targets were listed that al-Qaeda hijackers could crash planes into, including the Library Tower (now the U.S. Bank Tower) in Los Angeles. Al-Qaeda's first attacks against the U.S. after Bin Laden's 1998 fatwa were the 1998 African embassy bombings. In late 1998 or early 1999, bin Laden approved Mohammed to go forward with a new version of the 1996 plan.

Bin Laden provided leadership and financial support, and was involved in selecting participants. Atef provided operational support, including target selections and helping arrange travel for the hijackers. He initially selected Nawaf al-Hazmi and Khalid al-Mihdhar, both experienced jihadists who had fought in the Bosnian war. The two arrived in the United States in mid-January 2000. In early 2000, they took flying lessons in San Diego, California. Both spoke little English. They performed poorly in flying lessons, and so they eventually served as secondary "muscle" hijackers.

The Hamburg cell in Germany included Islamists who were key operatives in the 9/11 attacks. In late 1999, cell members bin al-Shibh, Mohamed Atta, Marwan al-Shehhi, and Ziad Jarrah arrived to meet al-Qaeda in Afghanistan. Bin Laden selected these men because they were educated, could speak English, and had experience living in the West. New recruits were routinely screened for special skills and al-Qaeda leaders consequently discovered that Hani Hanjour already had a commercial pilot's license.

Hanjour arrived in San Diego on December 8, 2000, joining al-Hazmi. They soon left for Arizona, where Hanjour took refresher training. Marwan al-Shehhi arrived at the end of May 2000, while Atta arrived on June 3, 2000, and Jarrah arrived on June 27, 2000. Bin al-Shibh applied several times for a visa to the United States, but as a Yemeni, he was rejected out of concerns he would overstay his visa. Bin al-Shibh stayed in Hamburg, providing coordination between Atta and Mohammed. The three Hamburg cell members all took pilot training in South Florida at Huffman Aviation.

In the spring of 2001, the secondary hijackers began arriving in the United States. In July 2001, Atta met with bin al-Shibh in Spain, where they coordinated details of the plot, including final target selection. Bin al-Shibh passed along bin Laden's wish for the attacks to be carried out as soon as possible. Some of the hijackers received passports from corrupt Saudi officials who were family members or used fraudulent passports to gain entry.

=== Prior intelligence ===
In late 1999, al-Qaeda associate Walid bin Attash ("Khallad") contacted al-Mihdhar and told him to meet in Kuala Lumpur, Malaysia; al-Hazmi and Abu Bara al Yemeni would also be in attendance. The NSA intercepted a telephone call mentioning the meeting, al-Mihdhar, and the name "Nawaf" (al-Hazmi); while the agency feared "Something nefarious might be afoot", it took no further action.

The CIA had already been alerted by Saudi intelligence about al-Mihdhar and al-Hazmi being al-Qaeda members. A CIA team broke into al-Mihdhar's Dubai hotel room and discovered that Mihdhar had a U.S. visa. While Alec Station alerted intelligence agencies worldwide, it did not share this information with the FBI. The Malaysian Special Branch observed the January 5, 2000, meeting of the two al-Qaeda members and informed the CIA that al-Mihdhar, al-Hazmi, and Khallad were flying to Bangkok, but the CIA never notified other agencies of this, nor did it ask the State Department to put al-Mihdhar on its watchlist. An FBI liaison asked permission to inform the FBI of the meeting but was told: "This is not a matter for the FBI."

By late June, senior counter-terrorism official Richard Clarke and CIA director George Tenet were "convinced that a major series of attacks was about to come", although the CIA believed the attacks would likely occur in Saudi Arabia or Israel. In early July, Clarke put domestic agencies on "full alert", telling them, "Something spectacular is going to happen here, and it's going to happen soon." He asked the FBI and the State Department to alert the embassies and police departments, and the Defense Department to go to "Threat Condition Delta." Clarke later wrote:

Somewhere in CIA there was information that two known al-Qaeda terrorists had come into the United States. Somewhere in the FBI, there was information that strange things had been going on at flight schools in the United States. [...] They had specific information about individual terrorists from which one could have deduced what was about to happen. None of that information got to me or the White House.

[...] by July [2001], with word spreading of a coming attack, a schism emerged among the senior leadership of al Qaeda. Several senior members reportedly agreed with Mullah Omar. Those who reportedly sided with bin Ladin included Atef, Sulayman Abu Ghayth, and Khalid Sheikh Mohammed. But those said to have opposed him were weighty figures in the organization-including Abu Hafs the Mauritanian, Sheikh Saeed al Masri, and Sayf al Adl. One senior al Qaeda operative claims to recall Bin Ladin arguing that attacks against the United States needed to be carried out immediately to support insurgency in the Israeli-occupied territories and protest the presence of U.S. forces in Saudi Arabia.

— 9/11 Commission Report, p. 251

On July 13, Tom Wilshire, a CIA agent assigned to the FBI's international terrorism division, emailed his superiors at the CIA's Counterterrorism Center (CTC) requesting permission to inform the FBI that Hazmi was in the country and that Mihdhar had a U.S. visa. The CIA never responded.

The same day, Margarette Gillespie, an FBI analyst working in the CTC, was told to review material about the Malaysia meeting. She was not told of the participant's presence in the U.S. The CIA gave Gillespie surveillance photos of Mihdhar and Hazmi from the meeting to show to FBI counterterrorism but did not tell her their significance. The Intelink database informed her not to share intelligence material with criminal investigators. When shown the photos, the FBI refused more details on their significance, and they were not given Mihdhar's date of birth or passport number. In late August 2001, Gillespie told the INS, the State Department, the Customs Service, and the FBI to put Hazmi and Mihdhar on their watchlists, but the FBI was prohibited from using criminal agents in searching for the duo, hindering their efforts.

Also in July, a Phoenix-based FBI agent sent a message to FBI headquarters, Alec Station, and FBI agents in New York alerting them to "the possibility of a coordinated effort by Osama bin Laden to send students to the United States to attend civil aviation universities and colleges." The agent, Kenneth Williams, suggested the need to interview flight school managers and identify all Arab students seeking flight training. In July, Jordan alerted the U.S. that al-Qaeda was planning an attack on the U.S.; "months later", Jordan notified the U.S. that the attack's codename was "The Big Wedding" and that it involved airplanes.

On August 6, 2001, the CIA's Presidential Daily Brief, designated "For the President Only", was entitled Bin Ladin Determined To Strike in US. The memo noted that FBI information "indicates patterns of suspicious activity in this country consistent with preparations for hijackings or other types of attacks."

In mid-August, one Minnesota flight school alerted the FBI about Zacarias Moussaoui, who had asked "suspicious questions." The FBI found that Moussaoui was a radical who had traveled to Pakistan, and the INS arrested him for overstaying his French visa. Their request to search his laptop was denied by FBI headquarters due to the lack of probable cause.

The failures in intelligence-sharing were attributed to 1995 Justice Department policies limiting intelligence-sharing, combined with CIA and NSA reluctance to reveal "sensitive sources and methods" such as tapped phones. Testifying before the 9/11 Commission in April 2004, then-Attorney General John Ashcroft recalled that the "single greatest structural cause for the September 11th problem was the wall that segregated or separated criminal investigators and intelligence agents." Clarke also wrote: "[T]here were ... failures to get information to the right place at the right time."

== Attacks ==
Early on the morning of September 11, 2001, nineteen hijackers took control of four commercial airliners (two Boeing 757s and two Boeing 767s). Large planes with long flights were selected for hijacking because they would have more fuel. Nobody on the planes survived.

Key information about the four flights
Operator	Flight number	Aircraft type	Time of departure (Note: Eastern Daylight Time (UTC−04:00))	Time of crash	Departed from	En route to	Crash site	Fatalities				
Operator	Flight number	Aircraft type	Time of departure	Time of crash	Departed from	En route to	Crash site	Crew	Passengers (Note: Excluding hijackers)	Ground (Note: Including emergency workers)	Hijackers	Total (Note: Including hijackers)
American Airlines	11	Boeing 767-223(ER) (Note: The aircraft was a Boeing 767-200(Extended Range "ER") model; Boeing assigns a unique code for each company that buys one of its aircraft, which is applied as an infix to the model number at the time the aircraft is built, hence "767-223(ER)" designates a 767-200 built for American Airlines (customer code 23).)	7:59 a.m.	8:46 a.m.	Logan International Airport	Los Angeles International Airport	North Tower of the World Trade Center, floors 93 to 99	11	76	2,606	5	2,763
United Airlines	175	Boeing 767–222 (Note: The aircraft was a Boeing 767-200 model; Boeing assigns a unique code for each company that buys one of its aircraft, which is applied as an infix to the model number at the time the aircraft is built, hence "767-222" designates a 767-200 built for United Airlines (customer code 22).)	8:14 a.m.	9:03 a.m.	Logan International Airport	Los Angeles International Airport	South Tower of the World Trade Center, floors 77 to 85	9	51	2,606	5	2,763
American Airlines	77	Boeing 757–223 (Note: The aircraft was a Boeing 757-200 model; Boeing assigns a unique code for each company that buys one of its aircraft, which is applied as an infix to the model number at the time the aircraft is built, hence "757-223" designates a 757-200 built for American Airlines (customer code 23).)	8:20 a.m.	9:37 a.m.	Washington Dulles International Airport	Los Angeles International Airport	West wall of Pentagon	6	53	125	5	189
United Airlines	93	Boeing 757–222 (Note: The aircraft was a Boeing 757-200 model; Boeing assigns a unique code for each company that buys one of its aircraft, which is applied as an infix to the model number at the time the aircraft is built, hence "757-222" designates a 757-200 built for United Airlines (customer code 22).)	8:42 a.m.	10:03 a.m.	Newark International Airport	San Francisco International Airport	Field in Stonycreek Township near Shanksville	7	33	0	4	44
Totals								33	213	2,731	19	2,996

=== Crashes ===
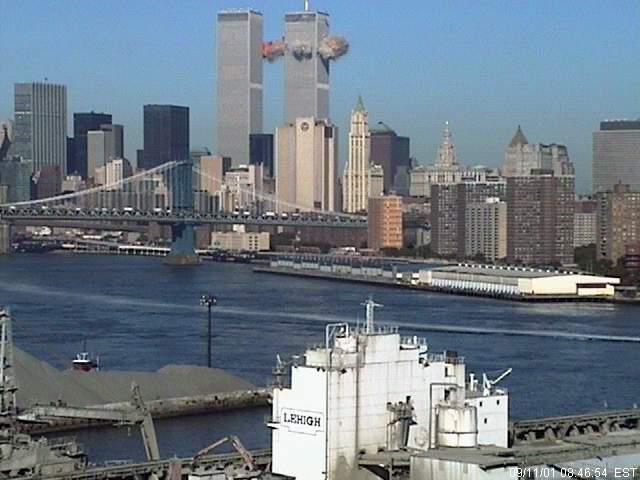
The North Tower (right) shortly after impact from American Airlines Flight 11, the day's first attack

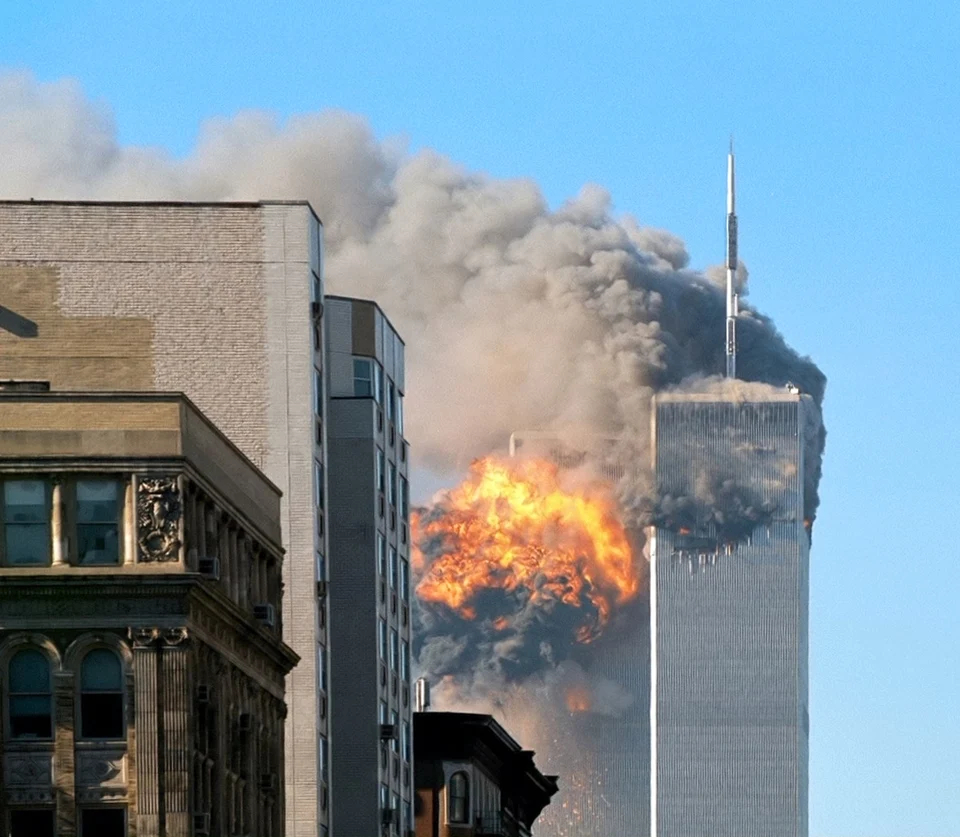
The South Tower (left) shortly after impact from United Airlines Flight 175, the day's second attack

Security camera footage of American Airlines Flight 77 crashing into the Pentagon, the third attack. The plane collides with the Pentagon approximately 86 seconds after the start of the recording.

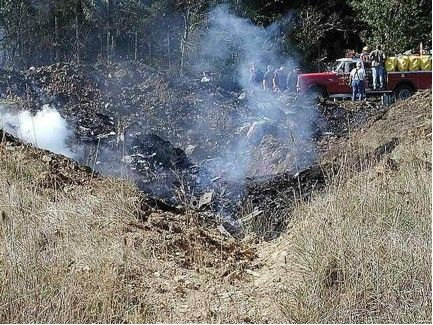
The crash site of United Airlines Flight 93, near Stonycreek Township shortly after the crash, the final attack

At 7:59 a.m., American Airlines Flight 11 took off from Logan International Airport in Boston. About fifteen minutes into the flight, five hijackers armed with boxcutters took over the plane, injuring at least three people and possibly killing one, before forcing their way into the cockpit. The terrorists also displayed an apparent explosive and sprayed mace into the cabin, to frighten the hostages into submission and further hinder resistance. Back at Logan, United Airlines Flight 175 took off at 8:14 a.m. Hundreds of miles southwest at Dulles International Airport, American Airlines Flight 77 left the runway at 8:20 a.m.

Flight 175's journey proceeded normally for 28 minutes until 8:42 am, when a group of five hijacked the plane, murdering both pilots and stabbing several crew members before assuming control of the aircraft. These hijackers also used bomb threats to instill fear into the passengers and crew, also spraying "tear gas, pepper spray or another irritant" in the cabin to force passengers and flight attendants to the rear of the cabin. Concurrently, United Airlines Flight 93 departed from Newark International Airport in New Jersey; originally scheduled to pull away from the gate at 8:00 a.m., the plane was running 42 minutes late.

At 8:46 a.m., Flight 11 was deliberately crashed into the north face of the World Trade Center's North Tower between the 93rd and 99th floors. The initial presumption by many was that it was an accident. At 8:51 a.m., American Airlines Flight 77 was also taken over by five hijackers who forcibly entered the cockpit 31 minutes after take-off. Although they were equipped with knives, there were no reports of anyone on board being stabbed, nor did the two people who made phone calls mention the use of mace or a bomb threat. Flight 175 was flown into the South Tower's southern facade (2 WTC) between the 77th and 85th floors at 9:03 a.m., demonstrating that the first crash was a deliberate act of terrorism.

Four men aboard Flight 93 struck suddenly, killing at least one passenger, after having waited 46 minutes—a holdup that proved disastrous for the terrorists when combined with the delayed takeoff. They stormed the cockpit and seized control of the plane at 9:28 a.m., turning the plane eastbound towards Washington, D.C. Much like their counterparts on the first two flights, the fourth team used bomb threats and filled the cabin with mace.

Nine minutes after Flight 93 was hijacked, Flight 77 crashed into the west side of the Pentagon at 9:37 a.m. Because of the two delays, the passengers and crew of Flight 93 had time to learn of the previous attacks through phone calls to the ground, and, as a result, an uprising was hastily organized to take control of the aircraft at 9:57 a.m. Passengers and crew began a counterattack to retake control of the aircraft. As the revolt reached the cockpit door, the hijacker-pilot began violently pitching and rolling the aircraft to disrupt the assault. The struggle continued until 10:03:11 a.m., when the aircraft crashed into a field in Stonycreek Township, near Shanksville, Pennsylvania, following a final roll onto its back, failing to reach the hijackers' intended target in Washington, D.C. The plane was about twenty minutes away from reaching D.C. at the time of the crash, and its target is believed to have been either the Capitol Building or the White House.

Some passengers and crew who called from the aircraft using the cabin air phone service and mobile phones provided details: several hijackers were aboard each plane; they used mace, tear gas, or pepper spray to overcome attendants; and some people aboard had been stabbed. Reports indicated hijackers stabbed and killed pilots, flight attendants, and one or more passengers. According to the 9/11 Commission's final report, the hijackers had recently purchased multi-function hand tools and assorted Leatherman-type utility knives with locking blades, which were not forbidden to passengers at the time, but these were not found among the possessions left behind by the hijackers.

A flight attendant on Flight 11, a passenger on Flight 175, and passengers on Flight 93 said the hijackers had bombs, but one of the passengers said he thought the bombs were fake. The FBI found no traces of explosives at the crash sites, and the 9/11 Commission concluded that the bombs were probably fake. On at least two of the hijacked flights—American 11 and United 93—the terrorists claimed over the PA system that they were taking hostages and were returning to the airport to have a ransom demand met, which the 9/11 Commission concluded was intended to prevent passengers from resisting. Both attempts failed, however, as both hijacker pilots in these instances (Atta and Jarrah, respectively) mistakenly transmitted their messages to ATC instead of the people on the plane as intended, tipping off the flight controllers that the planes had been hijacked.

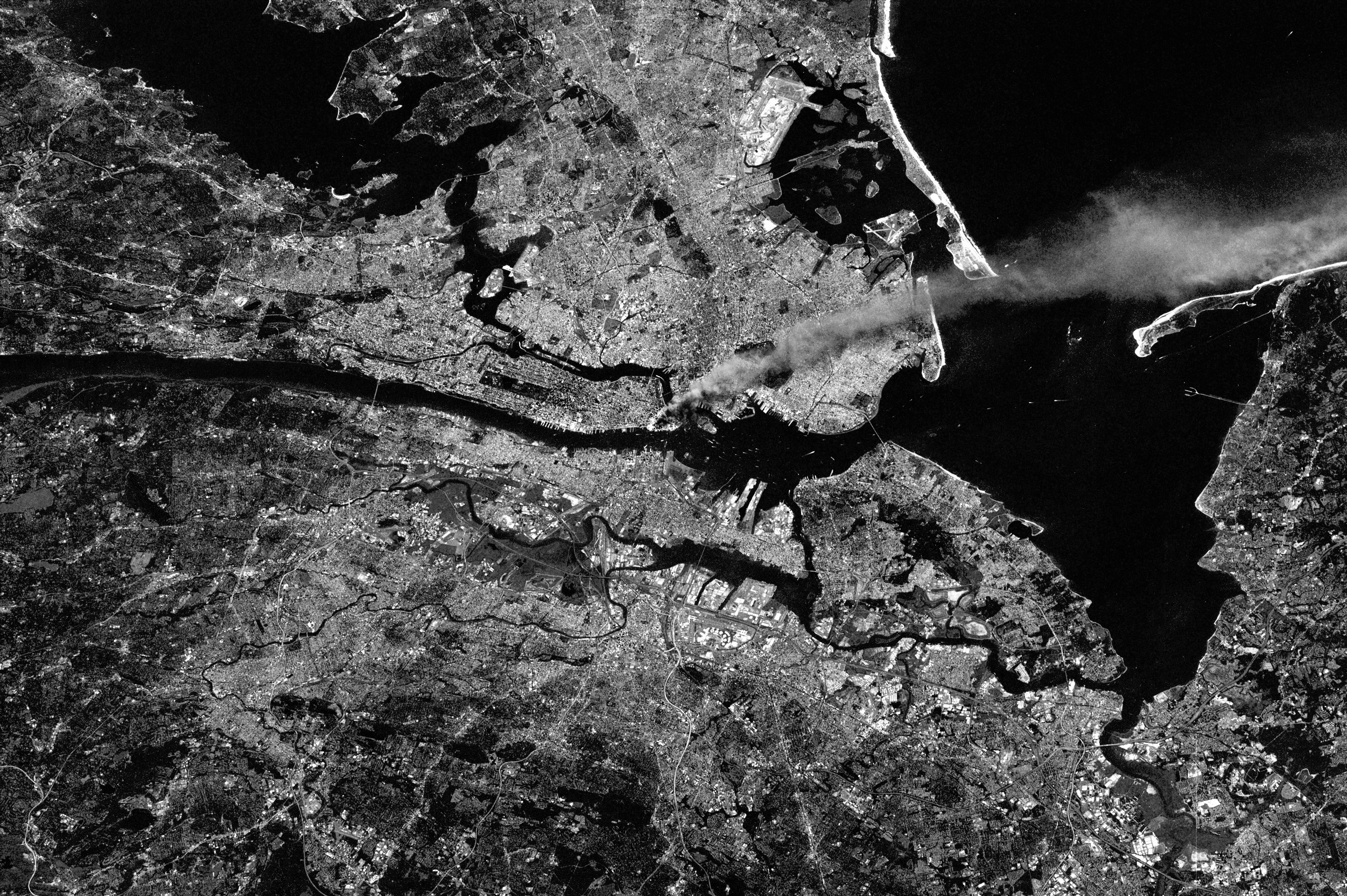
An image taken from the International Space Station showing the extent of the smoke plume

Three buildings in the World Trade Center collapsed due to fire-induced structural failure. Although the South Tower was struck around seventeen minutes after the North Tower, the plane's impact zone was far lower, at a much faster speed, and into a corner, with the unevenly-balanced additional structural weight causing it to collapse first at 9:59 a.m., having burned for 56 minutes (Note: NIST and the 9/11 Commission both state that the collapse began at 9:58:59 a.m., which is rounded to 9:59 for simplicity. If the commission's claim that the South Tower was struck at 9:03:11 is to be believed, then the collapse began 55 minutes and 48 seconds after the crash, not 56 minutes.) in the fire caused by the crash of United Airlines Flight 175 and the explosion of its fuel. The North Tower lasted just under 29 and a half minutes longer, before collapsing at 10:28 a.m., (Note: The exact time of the North Tower's collapse initiation is disputed, with NIST dubbing the moment it began to collapse as being 10:28:22 a.m. and the 9/11 Commission recording the time as 10:28:25.) just under one hour and forty-two minutes after being struck by American Airlines Flight 11.

When the North Tower collapsed, debris fell on the nearby 7 World Trade Center building (7 WTC), damaging the building and starting fires. These fires burned for nearly seven hours, compromising the building's structural integrity, and 7 WTC collapsed at 5:21 p.m. The west side of the Pentagon sustained significant damage. At 9:42 a.m., the Federal Aviation Administration (FAA) grounded all civilian aircraft within the continental U.S., and civilian aircraft already in flight were told to land immediately. All international civilian aircraft were either turned back or redirected to airports in Canada or Mexico, and were banned from landing on United States territory for three days.

The attacks created widespread confusion among news organizations and air traffic controllers. Among unconfirmed and often contradictory news reports aired throughout the day, one of the most prevalent claimed a car bomb had been detonated at the U.S. State Department's headquarters in Washington, D.C., but the report was retracted. Another jet (Delta Air Lines Flight 1989) was suspected of having been hijacked, but the aircraft responded to controllers and landed safely in Cleveland, Ohio.

Korean Air flight 085 diverted to Whitehorse, Yukon, Canada, surrounded by police snipers and Whitehorse airport and downtown evacuated after it responded to air traffic control to transmit a hijacking code but air traffic control interpreted it to mean an actual hijack and not merely a response to air traffic request. Prime Minister Jean Chretien of Canada had given the authorization to shoot down the Korean Air Boeing 747 if necessary. A single exception to the FAA's grounding order came on September 12, when a flight was authorized from Fort Lauderdale, to San Diego, and on to Miami to retrieve a rare antivenom for a professional snake handler who had been bitten by an inland taipan.

In an April 2002 interview, Mohammed and bin al-Shibh, who are believed to have organized the attacks, said Flight 93's intended target was the United States Capitol, not the White House. During the planning stage of the attacks, Atta thought the White House might be too tough a target and sought an assessment from Hanjour. Mohammed said al-Qaeda initially planned to target nuclear installations rather than the World Trade Center and the Pentagon, but decided against it, fearing things could "get out of control." Final decisions on targets, according to Mohammed, were left in the hands of the pilots. If any pilot could not reach his intended target, he was to crash the plane.

=== Casualties ===
The attack on the World Trade Center's North Tower alone (Note: The massacre at Camp Speicher―often described as the second deadliest act of terrorism in history after 9/11―is said to have killed between 1,095 and 1,700 people. The upper estimate would tie it with the attack on the World Trade Center's North Tower, but until the true death toll of the massacre becomes known, then the hijacking and crash of Flight 11 was the deadliest act of terrorism on record.) made 9/11 the deadliest act of terrorism in history. Taken together, the four crashes killed 2,996 people (including the hijackers) and injured thousands more. The death toll included 265 on the four planes (from which there were no survivors); 2,606 in the World Trade Center and the surrounding area; and 125 at the Pentagon. Most who died were civilians, as well as 343 firefighters, 72 law enforcement officers, 55 military personnel, and the 19 terrorists. More than 90 countries lost citizens in the attacks.

In New York City, more than 90% of those who died in the towers had been at or above the points of impact. In the North Tower, between 1,344 and 1,402 people were at, above or one floor below the point of impact and all died. Hundreds were killed instantly when the plane struck. The estimated 800 people who survived the impact were trapped and died in the fires or from smoke inhalation, fell or jumped from the tower to escape the smoke and flames, or were killed in the building's collapse. The destruction of all three staircases in the North Tower when Flight 11 hit made it impossible for anyone from the impact zone upward to escape. 107 people not trapped by the impact died. When Flight 11 struck between floors 93 and 99, the 92nd floor was rendered inescapable: the crash severed all elevator shafts while falling debris blocked the stairwells, ensuring the deaths of all 69 workers on the floor.

In the South Tower, around 600 people were on or above the 77th floor when Flight 175 struck; few survived. As with the North Tower, hundreds were killed at the moment of impact. Unlike those in the North Tower, the estimated 300 survivors of the crash were not technically trapped, but most were either unaware that a means of escape still existed or were unable to use it. One stairway, Stairwell A, narrowly avoided being destroyed, allowing 14 people located on the floors of impact, including Stanley Praimnath, a man who saw the plane coming at him, and four more from the floors above to escape. New York City 9-1-1 operators who received calls from people inside the tower were not well informed of the situation as it rapidly unfolded and as a result, told callers not to descend the tower on their own. In total, 630 people died in the South Tower, fewer than half the number killed in the North Tower. Of the 100–200 people witnessed jumping or falling to their deaths, only three recorded sightings were from the South Tower.

Casualties in the South Tower were significantly reduced because some occupants decided to leave the building immediately following the first crash or after witnessing North Tower occupants falling to their deaths, and because Eric Eisenberg, an executive at AON Insurance, decided to evacuate the floors occupied by AON (92 and 98–105) following the impact of Flight 11. The 17-minute gap allowed more than 900 of the 1,100 AON employees present to evacuate from above the 77th floor before the South Tower was struck. Eisenberg was among the nearly 200 who did not escape. Similar pre-impact evacuations were carried out by Fiduciary Trust, CSC, and Euro Brokers, all of whom had offices on floors above the point of impact. The failure to order a full evacuation of the South Tower after the first plane crash into the North Tower was described by USA Today as "one of the day's great tragedies."

As exemplified in the photograph The Falling Man, more than 200 people fell to their deaths from the burning towers, most of whom were forced to jump to escape the extreme heat, fire and smoke. Some occupants of each tower above the point of impact made their way toward the roof in the hope of helicopter rescue, but the roof access doors were locked. No plan existed for helicopter rescues, and the combination of roof equipment, thick smoke and intense heat prevented helicopters from approaching.

At the World Trade Center complex, 414 emergency workers died as they tried to rescue people and fight fires. Another law enforcement officer was killed when United 93 crashed. 343 firefighters of the New York City Fire Department (FDNY) died, including a chaplain and two paramedics. 23 officers of New York City Police Department (NYPD) died. 37 officers of the Port Authority Police Department (PAPD) died. Eight emergency medical technicians and paramedics from private emergency medical services units were killed. Almost all of the emergency personnel who died at the scene were killed as a result of the towers collapsing, with the exception of one who was struck by a civilian falling from the South Tower.

658 employees from Cantor Fitzgerald L.P., an investment bank on the North Tower's 101st–105th floors, died, considerably more than any other employer. 358 employees from Marsh Inc., located immediately below Cantor Fitzgerald on floors 93–100, died. 176 employees from Aon Corporation died. The National Institute of Standards and Technology (NIST) estimated that about 17,400 civilians were in the World Trade Center complex at the time of the attacks. Turnstile counts from the Port Authority suggest 14,154 people were typically in the Twin Towers by 8:45 a.m. Most people below the impact zone safely evacuated.

In Arlington County, Virginia, 125 Pentagon workers died when Flight 77 crashed into the building's western side. Seventy were civilians and 55 were military personnel, many of whom worked for the United States Army or the United States Navy. 47 civilian employees, six civilian contractors, and 22 soldiers working for the Army died, while six civilian employees, three civilian contractors, and 33 sailors working for the Navy died. Seven Defense Intelligence Agency (DIA) civilian employees and one Office of the Secretary of Defense contractor died. Timothy Maude, a Lieutenant General and Army Deputy Chief of Staff, was the highest-ranking military official killed at the Pentagon.

Weeks after the attack, the death toll was estimated to be over 6,000, more than twice the number of deaths eventually confirmed. The city was only able to identify remains for about 1,600 of the World Trade Center victims. The medical examiner's office collected "about 10,000 unidentified bone and tissue fragments that cannot be matched to the list of the dead." Bone fragments were still being found in 2006 by workers who were preparing to demolish the damaged Deutsche Bank Building.

In 2010, a team of anthropologists and archaeologists searched for human remains and personal items at the Fresh Kills Landfill, where 72 more human remains were recovered, bringing the total found to 1,845. As of 2011, DNA profiling was ongoing in an attempt to identify additional victims. In 2014, three coffin-size cases carrying 7,930 unidentified remains were transferred to a medical examiner's repository located at the same site as the National September 11 Memorial & Museum. Victims' families are permitted to visit a private "reflection room" which is closed to the public. The choice to place the remains in an underground area attached to a museum has been controversial; families of some victims have attempted to have the remains instead interred in a separate, above-ground monument.

In August 2017, the 1,641st victim was identified as a result of newly available DNA technology, and a 1,642nd during July 2018. Three more victims were identified in October 2019, two in September 2021 and an additional two in September 2023. As of 2025, 1,103 victims remain unidentified, amounting to 40% of the deaths in the World Trade Center attacks. On September 25, 2023, the FDNY reported that the department had now lost the same number of members to 9/11-related illnesses as it did on the day of the attacks.

=== Damage ===
A view directly above the attack on the World Trade Center. Showing the planes' position upon impact.

Location of debris from the two planes to impact the World Trade Center

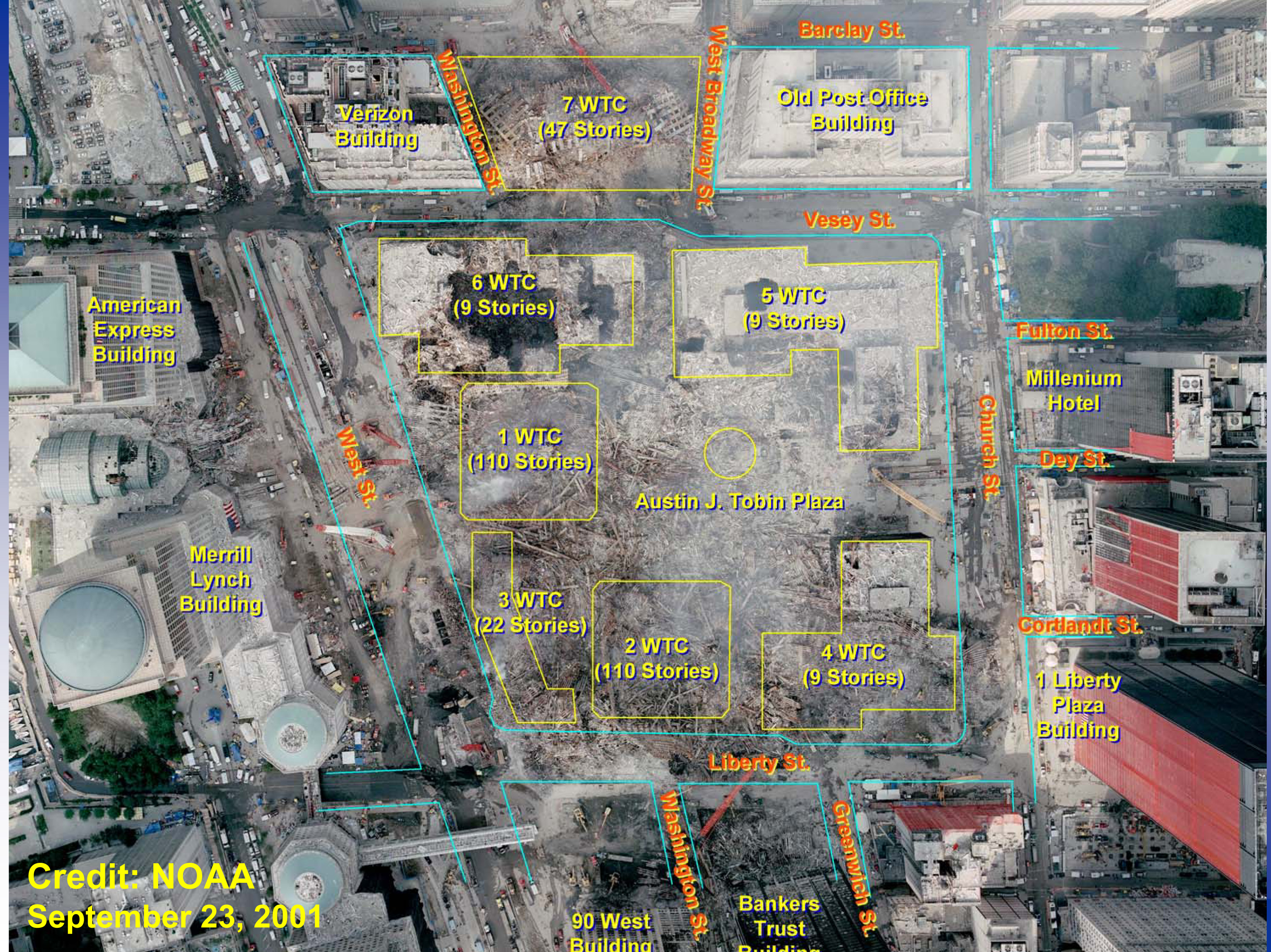
The World Trade Center site, referred to as Ground Zero, with an overlay showing the locations of the original buildings

The Twin Towers, Marriott World Trade Center (3 WTC), 7 WTC, and St. Nicholas Greek Orthodox Church were destroyed. The U.S. Customs House (6 World Trade Center), 4 World Trade Center, 5 World Trade Center, and both pedestrian bridges connecting buildings were severely damaged. All surrounding streets were in ruins. The last fires at the World Trade Center site were extinguished on December 20.

The Deutsche Bank Building was damaged and was later condemned as uninhabitable because of toxic conditions; it was deconstructed starting in 2007. Buildings of the World Financial Center were damaged. The Borough of Manhattan Community College's Fiterman Hall was condemned due to extensive damage, and then reopened in 2012.

Other neighboring buildings (including 90 West Street and the Verizon Building) suffered major damage but have been restored. World Financial Center buildings, One Liberty Plaza, the Millennium Hilton, and 90 Church Street had moderate damage and have been restored. Communications equipment on top of the North Tower was also destroyed, with only WCBS-TV maintaining a backup transmitter on the Empire State Building, but media stations were quickly able to reroute the signals and resume their broadcasts.

The PATH train system's World Trade Center station was located under the complex and was demolished when the towers collapsed. The tunnels leading to Exchange Place station in Jersey City were flooded with water. The station was rebuilt as the $4 billion World Trade Center Transportation Hub, which reopened in March 2015. The Cortlandt Street station on the New York City Subway's IRT Broadway–Seventh Avenue Line was also in close proximity to the World Trade Center complex, and the entire station, along with the surrounding track, was reduced to rubble. The station was rebuilt and reopened to the public on September 8, 2018.

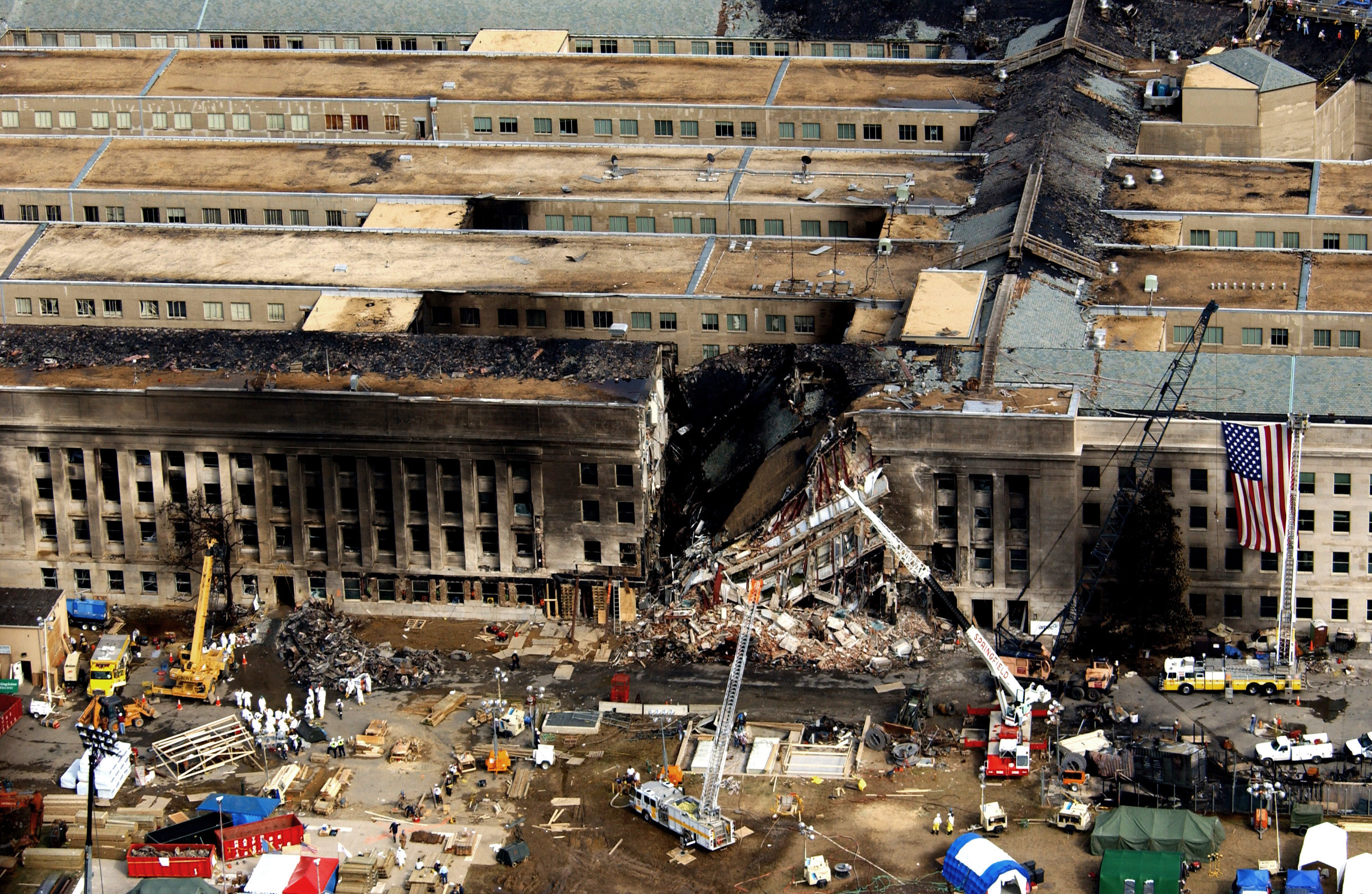
A September 14 aerial view of the Pentagon during cleanup operations

The Pentagon was extensively damaged, causing one section of the building's E ring to collapse. The plane hit the Pentagon at the first-floor level. The front part of the fuselage disintegrated on impact; debris from the tail section penetrated the furthest into the building, breaking through 310 feet (94 m) of the three outermost of the building's five rings.

=== Rescue efforts ===
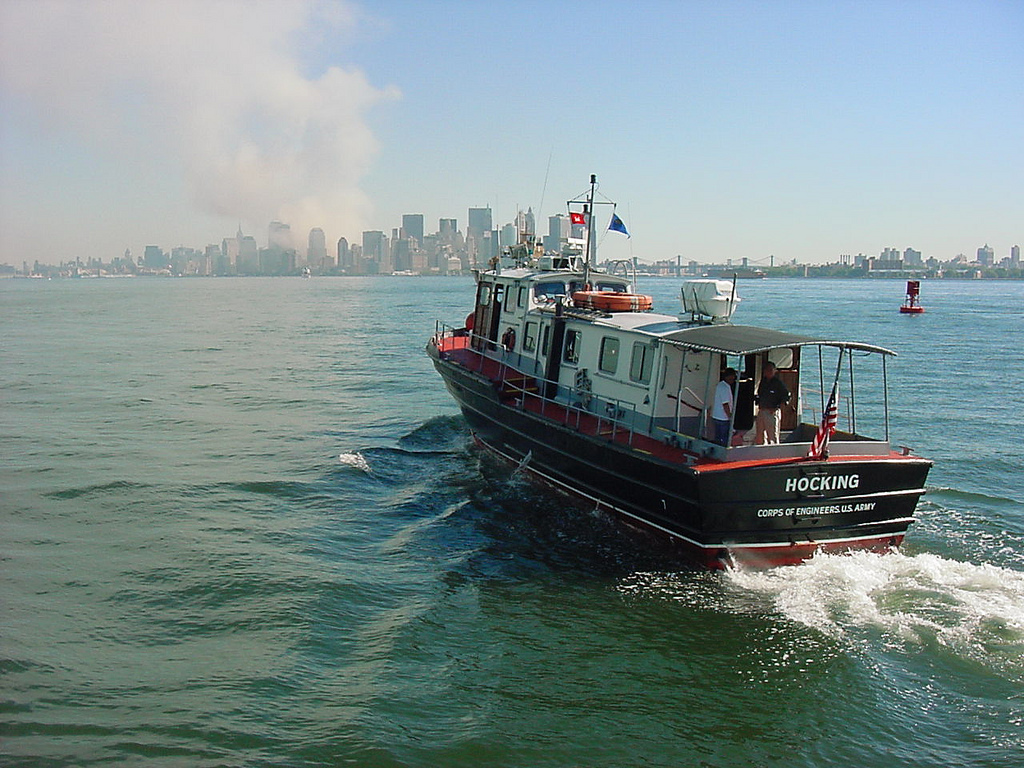
Patrol Boat Hocking of the U.S. Army Corps of Engineers on its way to assist in emergency relief efforts

The FDNY deployed more than 200 units (approximately half of the department) to the World Trade Center. Their efforts were supplemented by off-duty firefighters, Hatzolah, and emergency medical technicians. The NYPD sent its Emergency Service Units and other police personnel and deployed its aviation unit, which determined that helicopter rescues from the towers were not feasible. Numerous police officers of the Port Authority Police Department (PAPD) also participated in rescue efforts. Once on the scene, the FDNY, the NYPD, and the PAPD did not coordinate efforts and performed redundant searches for civilians.

As conditions deteriorated, the NYPD aviation unit relayed information to police commanders, who issued orders for personnel to evacuate the towers; most NYPD officers were able to evacuate before the buildings collapsed. With separate command posts set up and incompatible radio communications between the agencies, warnings were not passed along to FDNY commanders.

After the first tower collapsed, FDNY commanders issued evacuation warnings. Due to malfunctioning radio repeater systems, many firefighters never heard the evacuation orders. 9-1-1 dispatchers also received information from callers that was not passed along to commanders on the scene.

== Reactions ==
The 9/11 attacks resulted in immediate responses, including domestic reactions; closings and cancellations; hate crimes; international responses; and military responses. Shortly after the attacks, the September 11th Victim Compensation Fund was created by an Act of Congress. The purpose of the fund was to compensate the victims of the attacks and their families with their agreement not to file lawsuits against the airlines involved. Legislation authorizes the fund to disburse a maximum of $7.375 billion, including operational and administrative costs, of U.S. government funds. The fund was set to expire by 2020 but was prolonged in 2019 to allow claims to be filed until October 2090.

=== Immediate response ===
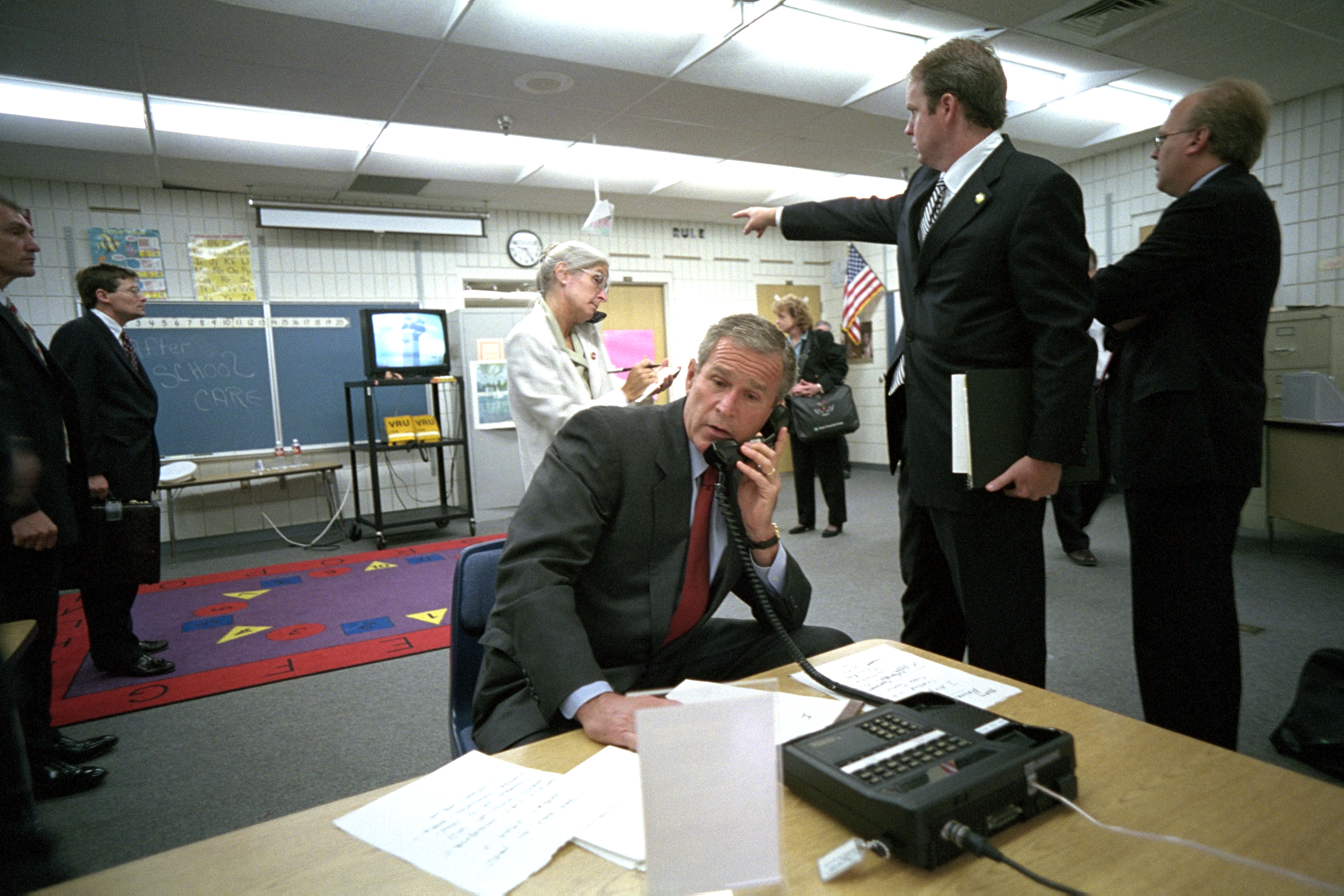
President George W. Bush is briefed in Sarasota, Florida, where he learned of the attacks unfolding while visiting the Emma E. Brooker elementary school during the morning.

Eight hours after the attacks, U.S. Secretary of Defense Donald Rumsfeld declares "The Pentagon is functioning"

At 8:32 a.m., FAA officials were notified Flight 11 had been hijacked, and they notified the North American Aerospace Defense Command (NORAD). NORAD scrambled two F-15s from Otis Air National Guard Base in Massachusetts; they were airborne by 8:53 a.m. Because of slow and confused communication from FAA officials, NORAD had nine minutes' notice, and no notice about any of the other flights before they crashed.

After both of the Twin Towers had been hit, more fighters were scrambled from Langley Air Force Base in Virginia at 9:30 a.m. At 10:20 am, Vice President Dick Cheney issued orders to shoot down any commercial aircraft that could be positively identified as being hijacked. These instructions were not relayed in time for the fighters to take action. Some fighters took to the air without live ammunition, knowing that to prevent the hijackers from striking their intended targets, the pilots might have to intercept and crash their fighters into the hijacked planes, possibly ejecting at the last moment.

For the first time in U.S. history, the emergency preparedness plan Security Control of Air Traffic and Air Navigation Aids (SCATANA) was invoked, stranding tens of thousands of passengers across the world. Ben Sliney, in his first day as the National Operations Manager of the FAA, ordered that American airspace be closed to all international flights, causing about 500 flights to be turned back or redirected to other countries. Canada received 226 of the diverted flights and launched Operation Yellow Ribbon to deal with the large numbers of grounded planes and stranded passengers.

The 9/11 attacks had immediate effects on the American people. Police and rescue workers from around the country traveled to New York City to help recover bodies from the remnants of the Twin Towers. More than 3,000 children lost a parent in the attacks. Blood donations across the U.S. surged in the weeks after 9/11.

=== Domestic reactions ===
President Bush addressing the nation from the White House at 8:30 pm ET

Bush speaking to rescue workers at Ground Zero on September 14 next to firefighter Bob Beckwith

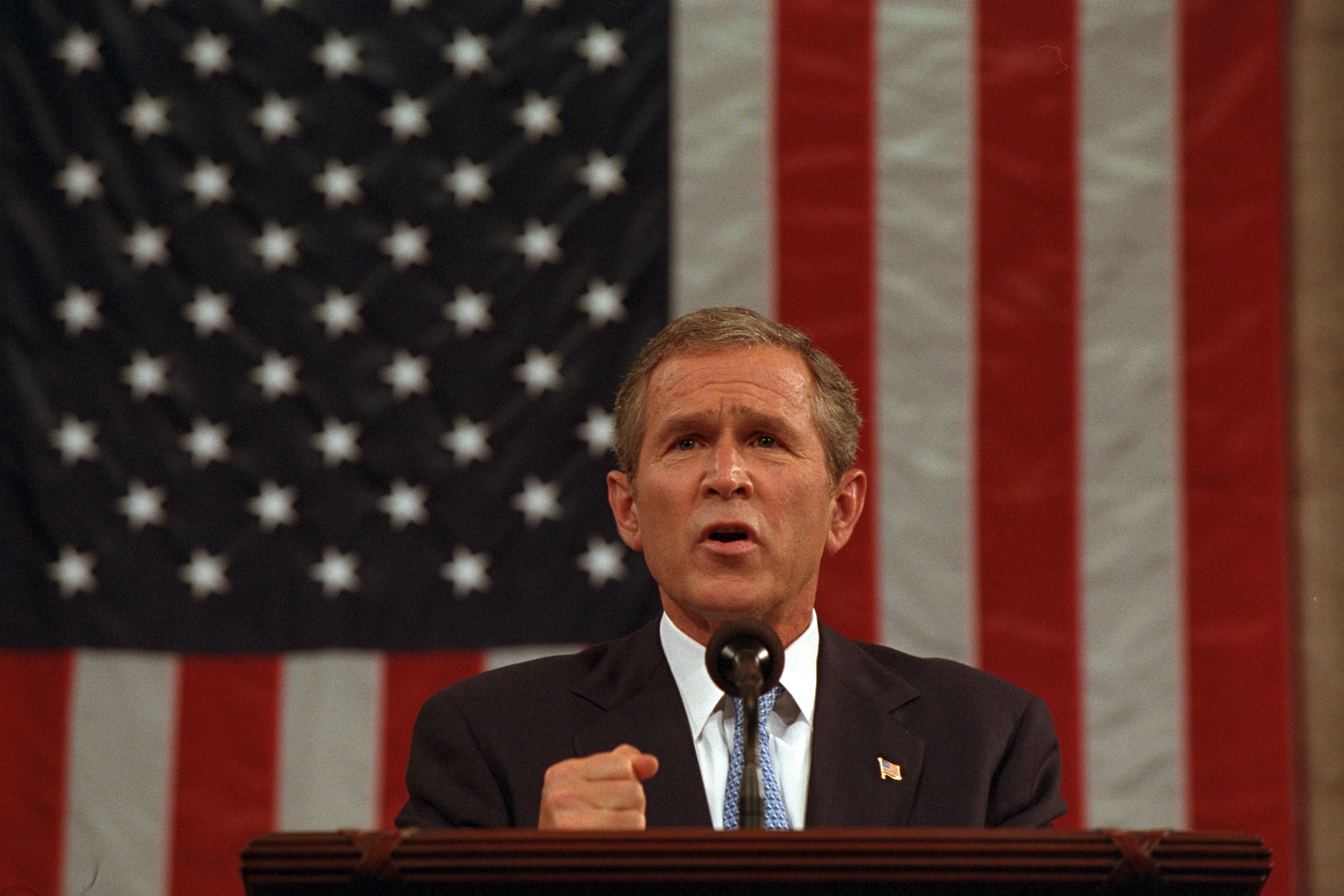

During a speech to a joint session of Congress, President George W. Bush pledges "to defend freedom against terrorism". September 20, 2001 (audio only)

Following the attacks, Bush's approval rating increased to 90%. On September 20, he addressed the nation and a joint session of Congress regarding the events, the rescue and recovery efforts, and his intended response to the attacks. New York City mayor Rudy Giuliani's highly visible role resulted in praise in New York and nationally.

Many relief funds were immediately set up to provide financial assistance to the survivors of the attacks and the victims' families. By the deadline for victims' compensation on September 11, 2003, 2,833 applications had been received from the families of those killed. Contingency plans for the continuity of government and the evacuation of leaders were implemented soon after the attacks. Congress was not told that the United States had been under a continuity of government status until February 2002. In the largest restructuring of the U.S. government in contemporary history, the United States enacted the Homeland Security Act of 2002, creating the U.S. Department of Homeland Security. Congress also passed the USA PATRIOT Act, saying it would help detect and prosecute terrorism and other crimes. Civil liberties groups have criticized the PATRIOT Act, saying it allows law enforcement to invade citizens' privacy and that it eliminates judicial oversight of law enforcement and domestic intelligence.

To effectively combat future acts of terrorism, the National Security Agency (NSA) was given broad powers. The NSA commenced warrantless surveillance of telecommunications, which was sometimes criticized as permitting the agency "to eavesdrop on telephone and e-mail communications between the United States and people overseas without a warrant." In response to requests by intelligence agencies, the United States Foreign Intelligence Surveillance Court permitted an expansion of powers by the U.S. government in seeking, obtaining, and sharing information on U.S. citizens, as well as non-Americans around the world.

==== Hate crimes ====
Six days after the attacks, President Bush made a public appearance at Washington, D.C.'s largest Islamic Center where he acknowledged the "incredibly valuable contribution" of American Muslims and called for them "to be treated with respect." Numerous incidents of harassment and hate crimes against Muslims and South Asians were reported in the days following the attacks.

Sikhs were also targeted due to their use of turbans, which are stereotypically associated with Muslims. There were reports of attacks on mosques and other religious buildings (including the firebombing of a Hindu temple), and assaults on individuals, including one murder: Balbir Singh Sodhi, a Sikh mistaken for a Muslim, who was fatally shot on September 15, 2001, in Mesa, Arizona. Two dozen members of Osama bin Laden's family were urgently evacuated out of the country on a private charter plane under FBI supervision three days after the attacks.

According to an academic study, people perceived to be Middle Eastern were as likely to be victims of hate crimes as followers of Islam during this time. The study also found a similar increase in hate crimes against people who may have been perceived as Muslims, Arabs, and others thought to be of Middle Eastern origin. A report by the South Asian American advocacy group South Asian Americans Leading Together documented media coverage of 645 bias incidents against Americans of South Asian or Middle Eastern descent between September 11 and 17, 2001. Crimes such as vandalism, arson, assault, shootings, harassment, and threats in numerous places were documented. Women wearing the hijab were also targeted.

==== Discrimination and racial profiling ====
A poll of Arab-Americans in May 2002 found that 20% had personally experienced discrimination since September 11. A July 2002 poll of Muslim Americans found that 48% believed their lives had changed for the worse since September 11, and 57% had experienced an act of bias or discrimination. Following the September 11 attacks, many Pakistani Americans identified themselves as Indians to avoid potential discrimination and obtain jobs.

By May 2002, there were 488 complaints of employment discrimination reported to the U.S. Equal Employment Opportunity Commission (EEOC). 301 of those were complaints from people fired from their jobs. Similarly, by June 2002, the U.S. Department of Transportation (DOT) had investigated 111 September 11th-related complaints from airline passengers purporting that their religious or ethnic appearance caused them to be singled out at security screenings in addition to 31 complaints from people who alleged they were blocked from boarding airplanes on the same grounds.

==== Muslim American response ====
Muslim organizations in the United States were swift to condemn the attacks and called "upon Muslim Americans to come forward with their skills and resources to help alleviate the sufferings of the affected people and their families." These organizations included the Islamic Society of North America, American Muslim Alliance, American Muslim Council, Council on American-Islamic Relations, Islamic Circle of North America, and the Shari'a Scholars Association of North America. Along with monetary donations, many Islamic organizations launched blood drives and provided medical assistance, food, and shelter for victims.

==== Interfaith efforts ====
Curiosity about Islam increased after the attacks. As a result, many mosques and Islamic centers began holding open houses and participating in outreach efforts to educate non-Muslims about the faith. In the first 10 years after the attacks, interfaith community service increased from 8 to 20 percent, and the percentage of U.S. congregations involved in interfaith worship doubled from 7 to 14 percent.

=== International reactions ===
The attacks were denounced by mass media and governments worldwide. Nations offered pro-American support and solidarity. Leaders in most Middle Eastern countries, as well as Libya and Afghanistan, condemned the attacks. Iraq was a notable exception, with an immediate official statement that "the American cowboys are reaping the fruit of their crimes against humanity." The government of Saudi Arabia officially condemned the attacks, but privately many Saudis favored bin Laden's cause.

Although Palestinian Authority (PA) president Yasser Arafat also condemned the attacks, there were reports of celebrations of disputed size in the West Bank, Gaza Strip, and East Jerusalem. Arafat ordered his security services to break up the celebrations and tried to obstruct news organizations from showing them. The PA claimed that such celebrations do not represent Palestinian sentiment overall. Footage by CNN and other news outlets were suggested by a report originating at a Brazilian university to be from 1991; this was later proven to be a false accusation. As in the United States, the aftermath of the attacks saw tensions increase in other countries between Muslims and non-Muslims.

United Nations Security Council Resolution 1368 condemned the attacks and expressed readiness to take all necessary steps to respond and combat terrorism in accordance with their Charter. Numerous countries introduced anti-terrorism legislation and froze bank accounts they suspected of al-Qaeda ties. Law enforcement and intelligence agencies in a number of countries arrested alleged terrorists.

British Prime Minister Tony Blair said Britain stood "shoulder to shoulder" with the United States. In a speech to Congress nine days after the attacks, which Blair attended as a guest, President Bush declared "America has no truer friend than Great Britain." Subsequently, Prime Minister Blair embarked on two months of diplomacy to rally international support for military action; he held 54 meetings with world leaders.

The U.S. set up the Guantanamo Bay detention camp to hold inmates they defined as "illegal enemy combatants." The legitimacy of these detentions has been questioned by the European Union and human rights organizations.

On September 25, 2001, Iran's president Mohammad Khatami, meeting British Foreign Secretary Jack Straw, said: "Iran fully understands the feelings of the Americans about the terrorist attacks in New York and Washington on September 11." He said although the American administrations had been at best indifferent about terrorist operations in Iran, the Iranians felt differently and had expressed their sympathetic feelings with bereaved Americans in the tragic incidents in the two cities. He also stated that "Nations should not be punished in place of terrorists."

According to Radio Farda's website, when the news of the attacks was released, some Iranian citizens gathered in front of the Embassy of Switzerland in Tehran, which serves as the protecting power of the United States in Iran, to express their sympathy, and some of them lit candles as a symbol of mourning. Radio Farda's website also states that in 2011, on the anniversary of the attacks, the United States Department of State published a post on its blog, in which the Department thanked the Iranian people for their sympathy and stated that it would never forget Iranian people's kindness. After the attacks, both the President and the Supreme Leader of Iran condemned the attacks. The BBC and Time magazine published reports on holding candlelit vigils for the victims by Iranian citizens on their websites. According to Politico Magazine, following the attacks, Ali Khamenei, the Supreme Leader of Iran, "suspended the usual 'Death to America' chants at Friday prayers" temporarily.

=== Military operations ===
An Army National Guard soldier and an FDNY firefighter searching debris at the World Trade Center site on September 18, 2001.

At 2:40 pm on September 11, Secretary of Defense Donald Rumsfeld was issuing orders to his aides to look for evidence of Iraqi involvement. According to notes taken by senior policy official Stephen Cambone, Rumsfeld asked for, "Best info fast. Judge whether they are good enough to hit S.H. at the same time. Not only OBL." Hours after the attacks, New York Governor George Pataki mobilized elements of the New York National Guard and ordered them to lower Manhattan. By nightfall, soldiers from the 42nd Infantry Division arrived at the WTC site and established a security perimeter around the piles of rubble that had once been the WTC complex. The 42nd Division later assumed command of the New York National Guard joint task force for response and recovery in lower Manhattan.

The District of Columbia Air National Guard's 113th Wing at Andrews Air Force Base was not part of the North American Aerospace Defense Command (NORAD) network tasked with domestic airspace monitoring. Following a direct inquiry to the Secret Service regarding airspace restrictions, the Secret Service bypassed the standard military chain of command to request an immediate fighter scramble from the White House.

Lt. Col. Marc Sasseville and 1st Lt. Heather Penney scrambled their F-16s without ammunition or live missiles, operating under ad-hoc orders to protect the capital using whatever force necessary—including intentional mid-air ramming maneuvers if United Airlines Flight 93 threatened the U.S. Capitol or White House. Later that afternoon, these air defense patrols over Washington, D.C., and New York City were formalized under the newly launched Operation Noble Eagle.

In a meeting at Camp David on September 15 the Bush administration rejected the idea of attacking Iraq in response to the September 11 attacks. Nonetheless, they later invaded the country with allies, citing "Saddam Hussein's support for terrorism." At the time, as many as seven in ten Americans believed the Iraqi president played a role in the 9/11 attacks. Three years later, Bush conceded that he had not.

The NATO council declared that the terrorist attacks on the United States were an attack on all NATO nations that satisfied Article 5 of the NATO charter. This marked the first invocation of Article 5, which had been written during the Cold War with an attack by the Soviet Union in mind. Australian Prime Minister John Howard, who was in Washington, D.C., during the attacks, invoked Article IV of the ANZUS treaty. The Bush administration announced a war on terror, with the stated goals of bringing bin Laden and al-Qaeda to justice and preventing the emergence of other terrorist networks. These goals would be accomplished by imposing economic and military sanctions against states harboring terrorists, and increasing global surveillance and intelligence sharing.

On September 14, 2001, the U.S. Congress passed the Authorization for the use of Military Force Against Terrorists, which grants the President the authority to use all "necessary and appropriate force" against those whom he determined "planned, authorized, committed or aided" the September 11 attacks or who harbored said persons or groups. It is still in effect.

On October 7, 2001, the war in Afghanistan began when U.S. and British forces initiated aerial bombing campaigns targeting Taliban and al-Qaeda camps, then later invaded Afghanistan with ground troops of the Special Forces. This eventually led to the overthrow of the Taliban's rule of Afghanistan with the Fall of Kandahar on December 7, by U.S.-led coalition forces.

Al-Qaeda leader Osama bin Laden, who went into hiding in the White Mountains, was targeted by U.S. coalition forces in the Battle of Tora Bora, but he escaped across the Pakistani border and remained out of sight for almost ten years. In an interview with Tayseer Allouni on October 21, 2001, bin Laden stated:

The events proved the extent of terrorism that America exercises in the world. Bush stated that the world has to be divided in two: Bush and his supporters, and any country that doesn't get into the global crusade is with the terrorists. What terrorism is clearer than this? Many governments were forced to support this "new terrorism"... America wouldn't live in security until we live it truly in Palestine. This showed the reality of America, which puts Israel's interest above its own people's interest. America won't get out of this crisis until it gets out of the Arabian Peninsula, and until it stops its support of Israel.

== Aftermath ==
=== Health issues ===
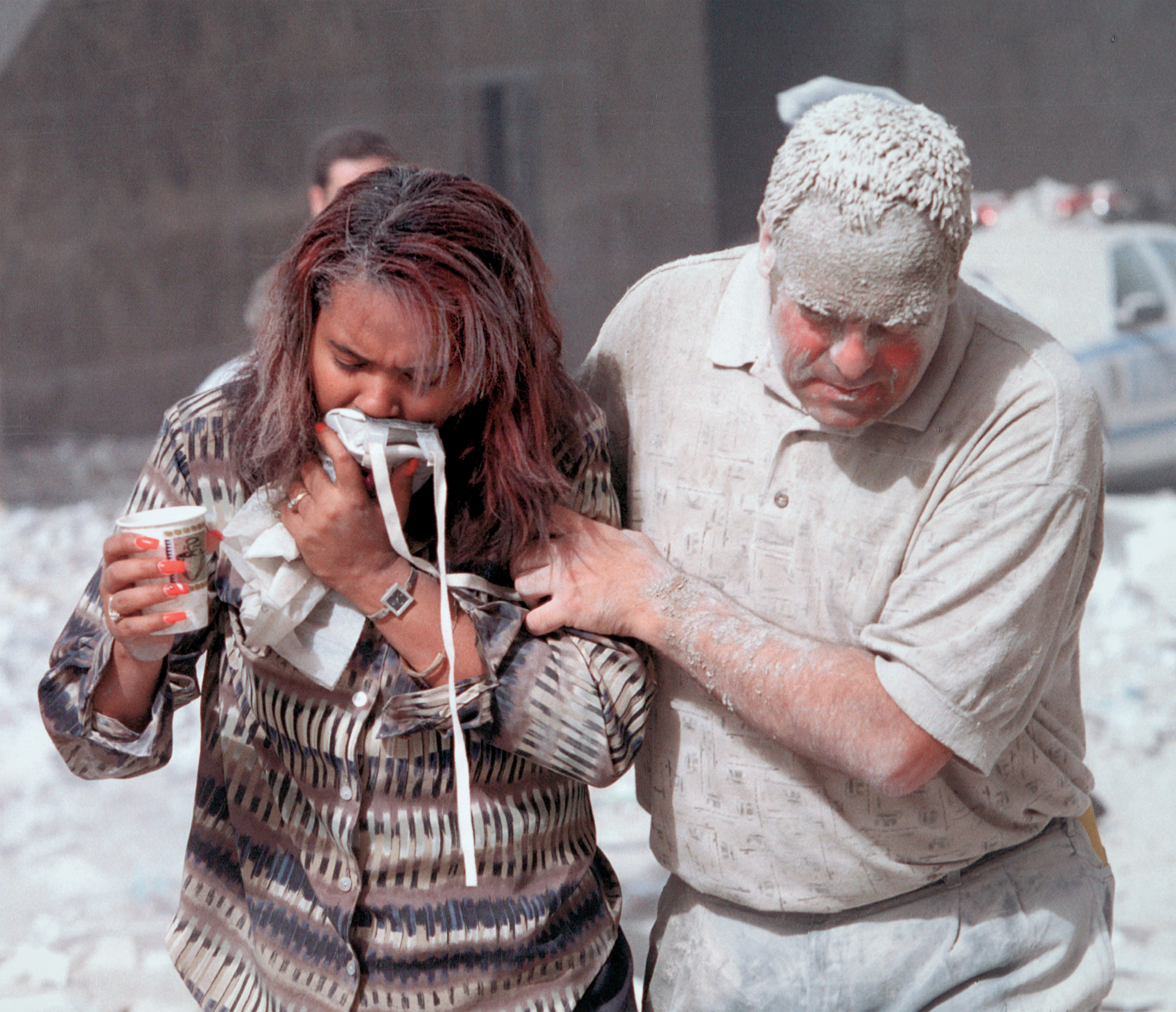
Survivors covered in dust after the collapse of the World Trade towers. A photograph of another dust-covered victim, Marcy Borders, subsequently gained much attention.

Hundreds of thousands of tons of toxic debris containing more than 2,500 contaminants and known carcinogens were spread across Lower Manhattan when the towers collapsed. Exposure to the toxins in the debris is alleged to have contributed to fatal or debilitating illnesses among people who were at Ground Zero. The Bush administration ordered the Environmental Protection Agency (EPA) to issue reassuring statements regarding air quality in the aftermath of the attacks, citing national security, but the EPA did not determine that air quality had returned to pre–September 11 levels until June 2002.

Health effects extended to residents, students, and office workers in Lower Manhattan and nearby Chinatown. Several deaths have been linked to the toxic dust, and victims' names were included in the World Trade Center memorial. An estimated 18,000 people have developed illnesses as a result of the toxic dust. There is also scientific speculation that exposure to toxic products in the air may have negative effects on fetal development. A study of rescue workers released in April 2010 found that all those studied had impaired lung function.

Years after the attacks, legal disputes over the costs of related illnesses were still in the court system. In 2006, a federal judge rejected New York City's refusal to pay for health costs for rescue workers, allowing for the possibility of suits against the city. Government officials have been faulted for urging the public to return to lower Manhattan in the weeks shortly after the attacks. Christine Todd Whitman, administrator of the EPA in the attacks' aftermath, was criticized by U.S. District Judge Deborah Batts, who wrote that Whitman's assurances about air quality were "without question conscience-shocking." Mayor Giuliani was criticized for urging financial industry personnel to return quickly to the greater Wall Street area.

The James L. Zadroga 9/11 Health and Compensation Act (2010) allocated $4.2 billion to create the World Trade Center Health Program, which provides testing and treatment for people with long-term health problems related to the 9/11 attacks. The WTC Health Program replaced preexisting 9/11-related health programs such as the Medical Monitoring and Treatment Program and the WTC Environmental Health Center program.

In 2020, the NYPD confirmed that 247 NYPD police officers had died due to 9/11-related illnesses. In September 2022, the FDNY confirmed that 299 firefighters had died due to 9/11-related illnesses. Both agencies believe that the death toll will rise dramatically in the coming years. The Port Authority of New York and New Jersey Police Department (PAPD), the law enforcement agency with jurisdiction over the World Trade Center, confirmed that four of its police officers have died of 9/11-related illnesses. The chief of the PAPD at the time, Joseph Morris, made sure that industrial-grade respirators were provided to all PAPD police officers within 48 hours and decided that the same 30 to 40 police officers would be stationed at the World Trade Center pile, drastically lowering the number of total PAPD personnel who would be exposed to the air. The FDNY and NYPD had rotated hundreds, if not thousands, of different personnel from all over New York City to the pile without adequate respirators and breathing equipment that could have prevented future diseases.

=== Economic ===
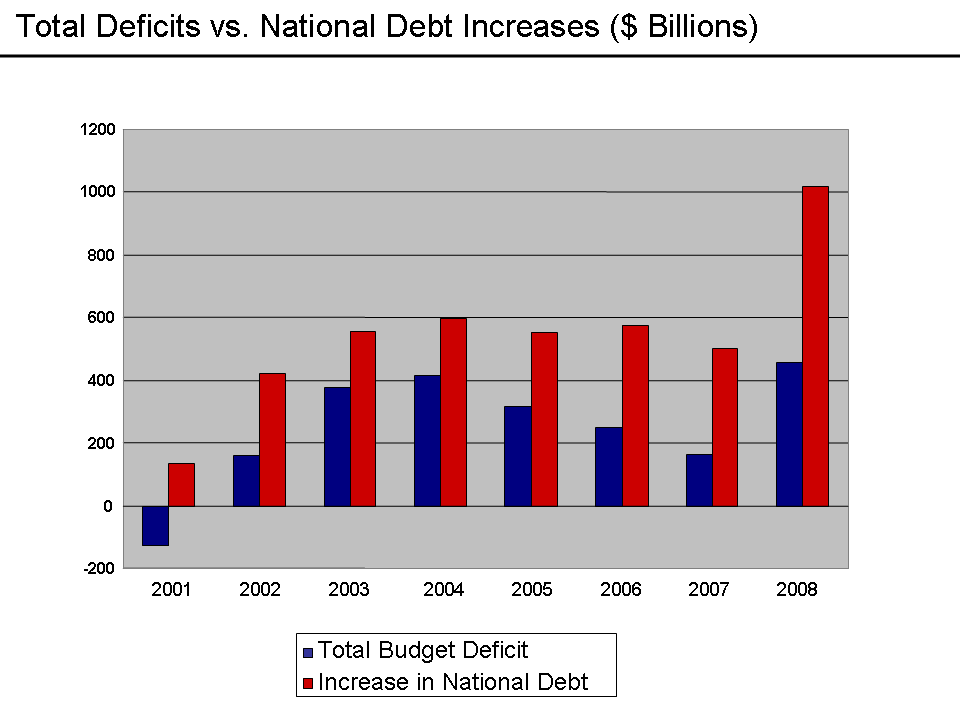
U.S. deficit and debt increases in the seven years following the attacks from 2001 to 2008

The attacks had a significant economic impact on the U.S. and world markets. The stock exchanges did not open on September 11 and remained closed until September 17. Reopening, the Dow Jones Industrial Average (DJIA) fell 684 points, or 7.1%, to 8921, a record-setting one-day point decline. By the end of the week, the DJIA had fallen 1,369.7 points (14.3%), at the time its largest one-week point drop in history. In 2001 dollars, U.S. stocks lost US$1.4 trillion in valuation for the week.

In New York City, about 430,000 job months and US$2.8 billion in wages were lost in the first three months after the attacks. The economic effects were mainly on the economy's export sectors. The city's GDP was estimated to have declined by US$27.3 billion for the last three months of 2001 and all of 2002. The U.S. government provided US$11.2 billion in immediate assistance to the Government of New York City in September 2001, and US$10.5 billion in early 2002 for economic development and infrastructure needs.

Also hurt were small businesses in Lower Manhattan near the World Trade Center (18,000 of which were destroyed or displaced), resulting in lost jobs and wages. Assistance was provided by Small Business Administration loans; federal government Community Development Block Grants; and Economic Injury Disaster Loans. Some 31,900,000 square feet (2,960,000 m^{2}) of Lower Manhattan office space was damaged or destroyed. Many wondered whether these jobs would return, and if the damaged tax base would recover. Studies of 9/11's economic effects show the Manhattan office real-estate market and office employment were less affected than first feared, because of the financial services industry's need for face-to-face interaction.

North American air space was closed for several days after the attacks and air travel decreased upon its reopening, leading to a nearly 20% cutback in air travel capacity, and exacerbating financial problems in the struggling U.S. airline industry.

The September 11 attacks also led to the U.S. wars in Afghanistan and Iraq, as well as additional homeland security spending, totaling at least US$5 trillion.

=== Effects in Afghanistan ===
If Americans are clamouring to bomb Afghanistan back to the Stone Age, they ought to know that this nation does not have so far to go. This is a post-apocalyptic place of felled cities, parched land and downtrodden people.

— Barry Bearak, The New York Times, September 13, 2001

Most of the Afghan population was already going hungry at the time of the attacks. In the aftermath of the attacks, tens of thousands of people attempted to flee Afghanistan due to the possibility of military retaliation by the U.S. and Pakistan, already home to many Afghan refugees from previous conflicts, closed its border with Afghanistan on September 17, 2001. Thousands of Afghans also fled to the frontier with Tajikistan but were denied entry. The Taliban leaders in Afghanistan pleaded against military action, saying "We appeal to the United States not to put Afghanistan into more misery because our people have suffered so much", referring to two decades of conflict and the humanitarian crisis attached to it.

All United Nations expatriates had left Afghanistan after the attacks and no national or international aid workers were at their post. Workers were instead preparing in bordering countries like Pakistan, China and Uzbekistan to prevent a potential "humanitarian catastrophe", amid a critically low food stock for the Afghan population. The World Food Programme stopped importing wheat to Afghanistan on September 12 due to security risks.

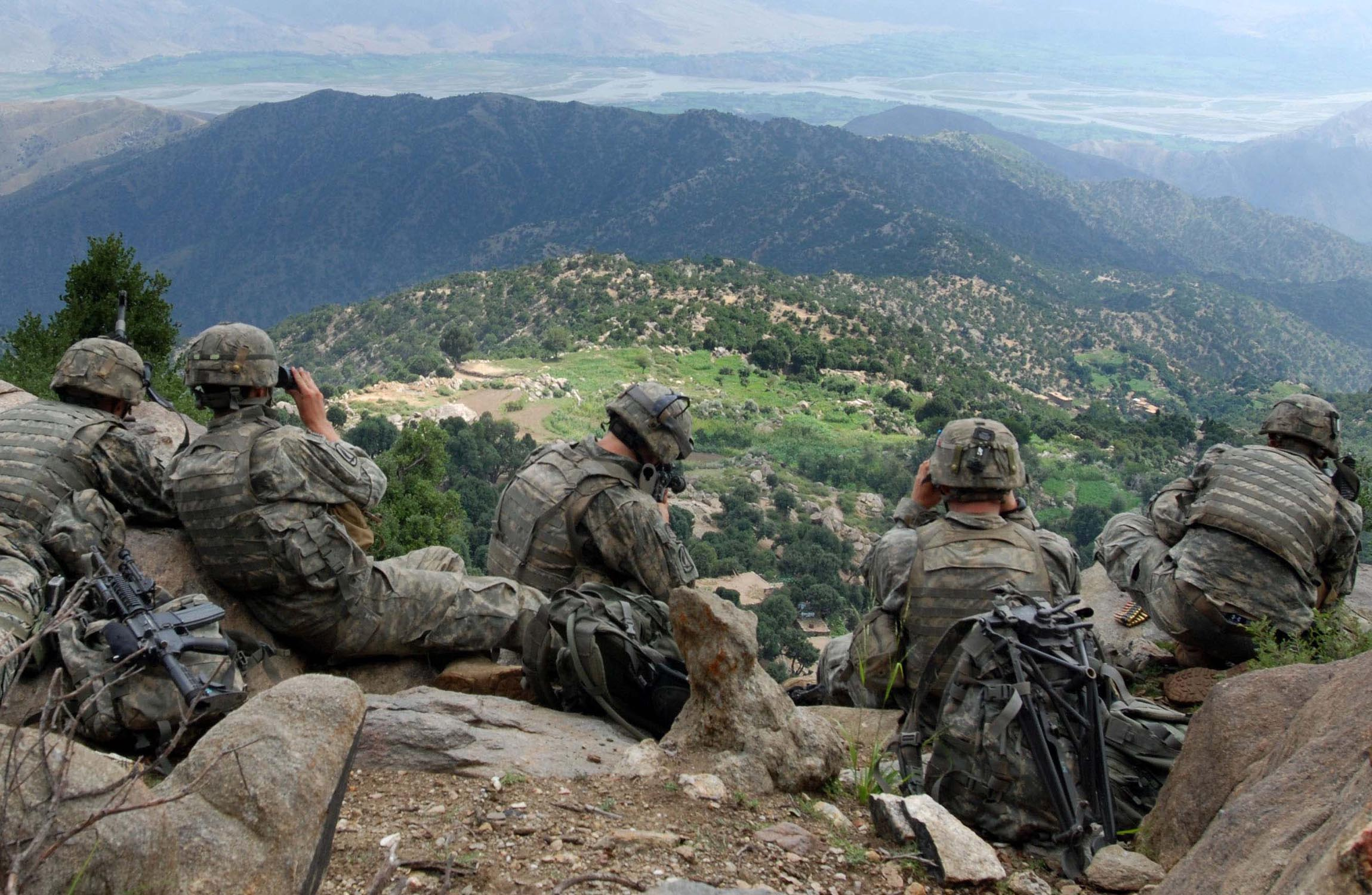
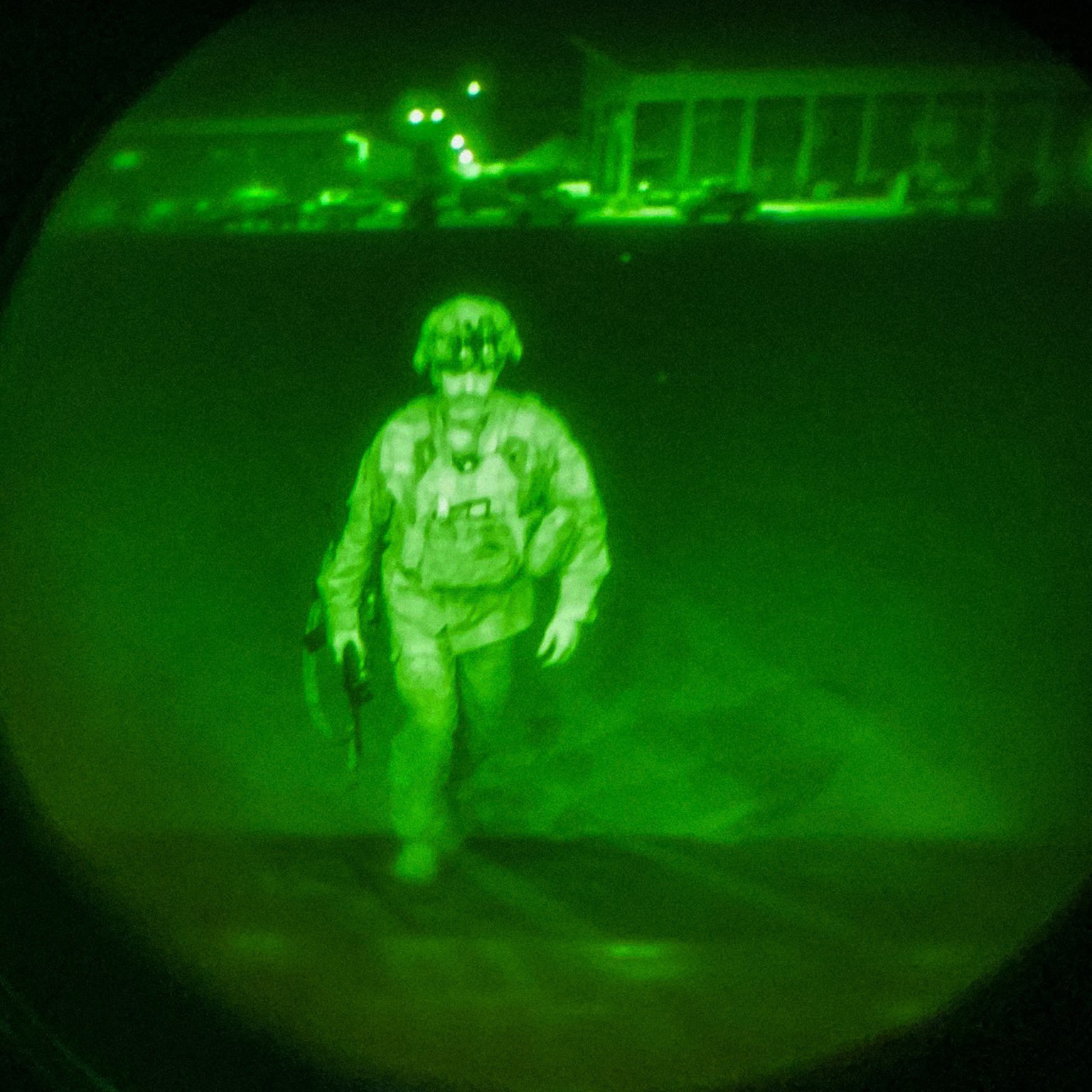
From left to right: U.S. soldiers engaged in the war on terror in Afghanistan in May 2006 • Army Major General Chris Donahue left Afghanistan as the final American soldier on August 30, 2021.

Approximately one month after the attacks, the United States led a broad coalition of international forces to overthrow the Taliban regime from Afghanistan for their harboring of al-Qaeda. Though Pakistani authorities were initially reluctant to align themselves with the U.S. against the Taliban, they permitted the coalition access to their military bases, and arrested and handed over to the U.S. more than 600 suspected al-Qaeda members.

In 2011, the U.S. and NATO under President Obama initiated a drawdown of troops in Afghanistan finalized in 2016. During the presidencies of Donald Trump and Joe Biden in 2020 and 2021, the United States alongside its NATO allies withdrew all troops from Afghanistan, completing the withdrawal of all regular U.S. troops on August 30, 2021. The withdrawal marked the end of the 2001–2021 war in Afghanistan. Biden said that after nearly 20 years of war, it was clear that the U.S. military could not transform Afghanistan into a modern democracy.

=== Cultural influence ===
Immediate responses to 9/11 included greater focus on home life and time spent with family, higher church attendance, and increased expressions of patriotism such as the flying of American flags. The radio industry responded by removing certain songs from playlists, and the attacks have subsequently been used as background, narrative, or thematic elements in film, music, literature, and humour. Already-running television shows as well as programs developed after 9/11 have reflected post-9/11 cultural concerns.

9/11 conspiracy theories have become a social phenomenon, despite a lack of support from expert scientists, engineers, and historians. 9/11 has also had a major impact on the religious faith of many individuals; for some it strengthened, to find consolation to cope with the loss of loved ones and overcome their grief; others started to question their faith or lose it entirely because they could not reconcile it with their view of religion.

The culture of the United States, after the attacks, is noted for heightened security and an increased demand thereof, as well as paranoia and anxiety regarding future terrorist attacks against most of the nation. Psychologists have also confirmed that there has been an increased amount of national anxiety in commercial air travel. Anti-Muslim hate crimes rose nearly ten-fold in 2001 and have subsequently remained "roughly five times higher than the pre-9/11 rate."

=== Government policies towards terrorism ===
Alleged "extraordinary rendition" illegal flights of the CIA, as reported by Polish newspaper Rzeczpospolita

The September 11 attacks introduced foreign terrorism as a major security issue to the U.S., as they indicated smaller states and terrorist organizations had become increasingly capable even against major global powers. Many governments across the world passed legislation to combat terrorism as a result to the attacks. In Germany, where several of the 9/11 terrorists had resided and taken advantage of that country's liberal asylum policies, two major anti-terrorism packages were enacted. The first removed legal loopholes that permitted terrorists to live and raise money in Germany. The second addressed the effectiveness and communication of intelligence and law enforcement. Canada passed the Canadian Anti-Terrorism Act, their first anti-terrorism law. The United Kingdom passed the Anti-terrorism, Crime and Security Act 2001 and the Prevention of Terrorism Act 2005. New Zealand enacted the Terrorism Suppression Act 2002.

In the United States, the Department of Homeland Security was created by the Homeland Security Act of 2002 to coordinate domestic anti-terrorism efforts. The USA Patriot Act gave the federal government greater powers, including the authority to detain foreign terror suspects for a week without charge; to monitor terror suspects' telephone communications, e-mail, and Internet use; and to prosecute suspected terrorists without time restrictions. The FAA ordered that airplane cockpits be reinforced with a secondary flight deck to prevent terrorists from gaining control of planes and assigned sky marshals to flights.

The Aviation and Transportation Security Act made the federal government, rather than airports, responsible for airport security. The law created the Transportation Security Administration to inspect passengers and luggage, causing long delays and concern over passenger privacy. After suspected abuses of the USA Patriot Act were brought to light in June 2013 with articles about the collection of American call records by the NSA and the PRISM program, Representative Jim Sensenbrenner (of Wisconsin), who introduced the Patriot Act in 2001, said that the NSA overstepped its bounds.

Criticism of the war on terror has focused on its morality, efficiency, and cost. According to a 2021 report by the Costs of War Project, the several post-9/11 wars participated in by the United States in its war on terror have caused the displacement, conservatively calculated, of 38 million people in Afghanistan, Pakistan, Iraq, Libya, Syria, Yemen, Somalia, and the Philippines. They estimated these wars caused the deaths of 897,000 to 929,000 people directly and cost US$8 trillion.

In a 2023 report, the Costs of War Project estimated that there have been between 3.6 and 3.7 million indirect deaths in the post-9/11 war zones, with the total death toll being 4.5 to 4.6 million. The report defined post-9/11 war zones as conflicts that included significant United States counter-terrorism operations since 9/11, which in addition to the wars in Iraq, Afghanistan and Pakistan, also includes the civil wars in Syria, Yemen, Libya and Somalia. The report derived its estimate of indirect deaths using a calculation from the Geneva Declaration of Secretariat which estimates that for every person directly killed by war, four more die from the indirect consequences of war.

The U.S. Constitution and U.S. law prohibits the use of torture, yet such human rights violations occurred during the war on terror under the euphemism "enhanced interrogation." In 2005, The Washington Post and Human Rights Watch (HRW) published revelations concerning CIA flights and "black sites", covert prisons operated by the CIA. The term "torture by proxy" is used by some critics to describe situations in which the CIA and other U.S. agencies have transferred suspected terrorists to countries known to employ torture.

=== Legal proceedings ===
President Obama's address to the U.S. after the killing of bin Laden Also available: Audio only

As all 19 hijackers died in the attacks, they were never prosecuted. Osama bin Laden was never formally indicted; he was ultimately killed by U.S. special operations forces on May 2, 2011, in his compound in Abbottabad, Pakistan, after a 10-year manhunt. (Note: President Barack Obama announced his death on May 1. At the time of the raid, it was early morning of May 2 in Pakistan and late afternoon of May 1 in the U.S.) The main trial of the attacks against Mohammed and his co-conspirators Walid bin Attash, Ramzi bin al-Shibh, Ammar al-Baluchi, and Mustafa Ahmad al-Hawsawi remains unresolved. Khalid Sheikh Mohammed was arrested on March 1, 2003, in Rawalpindi, Pakistan, by Pakistani security officials working with the CIA. He was then held at multiple CIA secret prisons and Guantanamo Bay detention camp, where he was interrogated and tortured with methods including waterboarding.

In 2003, al-Hawsawi and Abd al-Aziz Ali were arrested and transferred to U.S. custody. Both would later be accused of providing money and travel assistance to the hijackers. During U.S. hearings at Guantanamo Bay in March 2007, Mohammed again confessed his responsibility for the attacks, stating he "was responsible for the 9/11 operation from A to Z" and that his statement was not made under duress. In January 2023, the U.S. government opened up about a potential plea deal, with Biden giving up on the effort in September that year.

To date, only peripheral persons have thus been convicted for charges in connection with the attacks. These include:

- Zacarias Moussaoui who was indicted in December 2001 and sentenced to life in prison without the possibility of parole in May 2006 by a U.S. federal jury
- Mounir el-Motassadeq who was first convicted in February 2003 by a Federal Court of Justice in Germany and was deported to Morocco in October 2018 after serving his sentence
- Abu Dahdah who was arrested in November 2001, sentenced by a Spanish High Court and released from prison in May 2013.

In July 2024, The New York Times reported that Mohammed, bin Attash, and al-Hawsawi had agreed to plead guilty to conspiracy in exchange for life sentences, avoiding trial and execution. However, U.S. Defense Secretary Lloyd Austin revoked a plea agreement with Mohammed days later.

== Investigations ==
=== FBI ===
Immediately after the attacks, the Federal Bureau of Investigation (FBI) started PENTTBOM, the largest criminal inquiry in U.S. history. At its height, more than half of the FBI's agents worked on the investigation and followed a half-million leads. The FBI concluded that there was "clear and irrefutable" evidence linking al-Qaeda and bin Laden to the attacks.

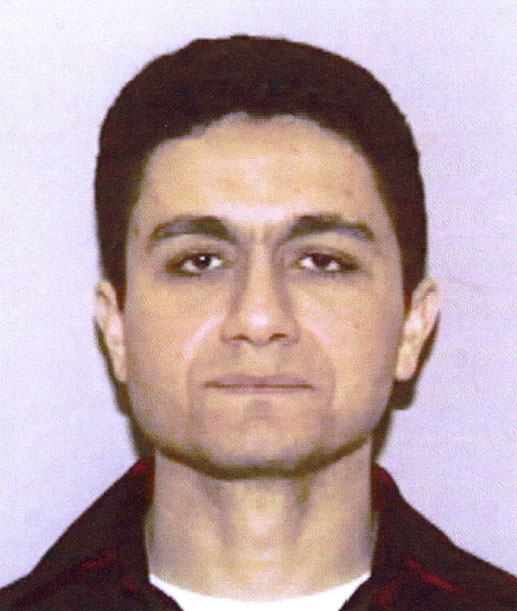
Mohammed Atta

The FBI quickly identified the hijackers, including leader Atta, when his luggage was discovered at Boston's Logan Airport. Atta had been forced to check two of his three bags due to space limitations on the 19-seat commuter flight he took to Boston. Due to a new policy instituted to prevent flight delays, the luggage failed to make it aboard American Airlines Flight 11 as planned. The luggage contained the hijackers' names, assignments, and al-Qaeda connections. "It had all these Arab-language [sic] papers that amounted to the Rosetta stone of the investigation," said one FBI agent.

Within hours of the attacks, the FBI released the names and in many cases the personal details of the suspected pilots and hijackers. Abu Jandal, who served as bin Laden's chief bodyguard for years, confirmed the identity of seven hijackers as al-Qaeda members during interrogations with the FBI on September 17. He had been jailed in a Yemeni prison since 2000. On September 27, photos of all 19 hijackers were released, along with information about possible nationalities and aliases. Fifteen of the men were from Saudi Arabia, two were from the United Arab Emirates, one was from Egypt, and one was from Lebanon.

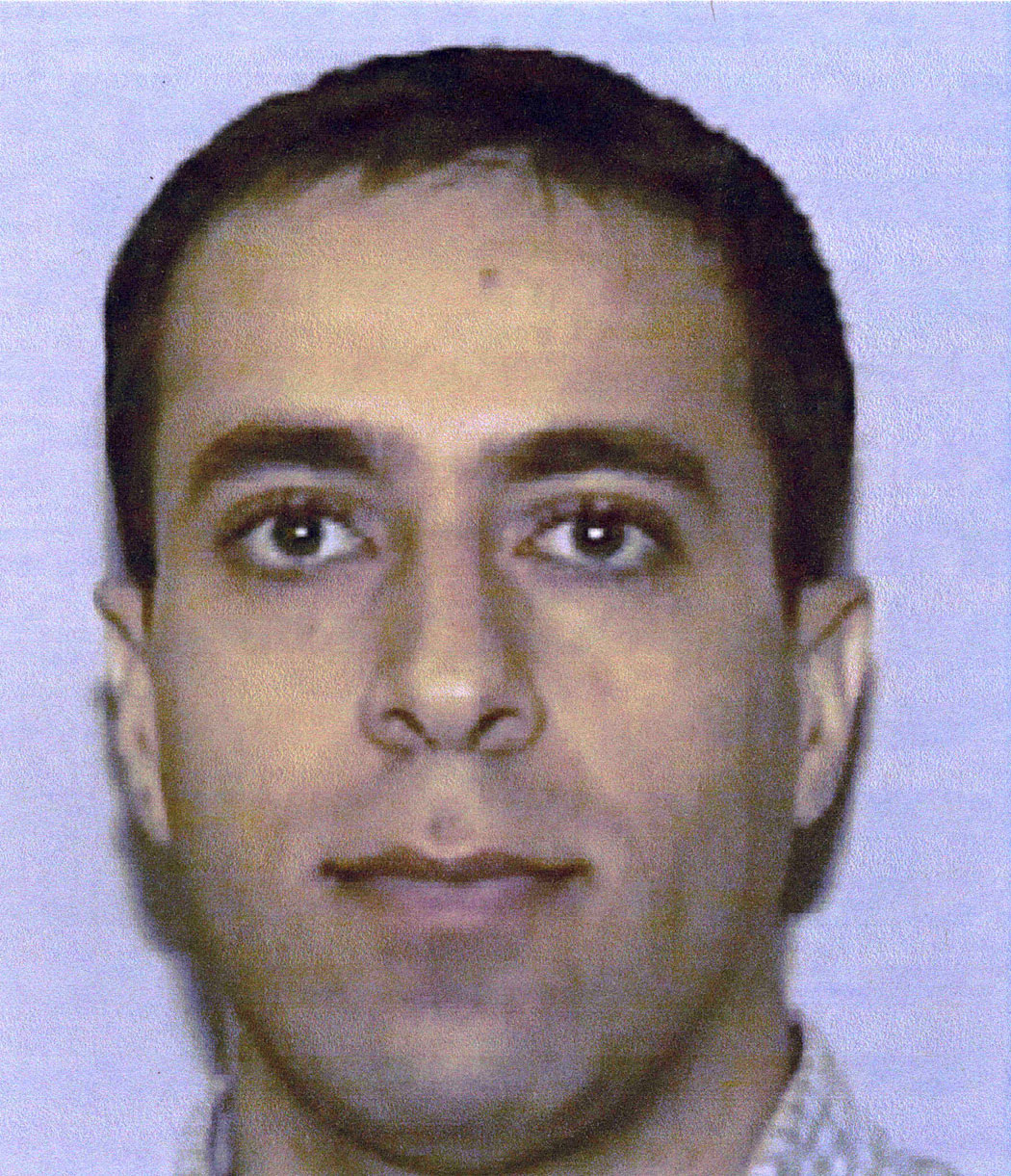
Ziad Jarrah

By midday, the U.S. National Security Agency and German intelligence agencies had intercepted communications pointing to Osama bin Laden. Two of the hijackers were known to have traveled with a bin Laden associate to Malaysia in 2000 and Atta had previously gone to Afghanistan. He and others were part of a terrorist cell in Hamburg, Germany. One of the members of the Hamburg cell in Germany was discovered to have been in communication with Khalid Sheikh Mohammed who was identified as a member of al-Qaeda.

Authorities in the United States and the United Kingdom also obtained electronic intercepts, including telephone conversations and electronic bank transfers, which indicated that Mohammed Atef was a key figure in the planning of the 9/11 attacks. Intercepts were also obtained of conversations that took place days before September 11 between bin Laden and an associate in Pakistan referring to "an incident that would take place in America on, or around, September 11" and discussing potential repercussions. In another conversation with an associate in Afghanistan, bin Laden discussed the "scale and effects of a forthcoming operation." These conversations did not specifically mention the World Trade Center, the Pentagon, or other specifics.

Origins of the 19 hijackers
Nationality	Number
Saudi Arabia	15
United Arab Emirates	2
Egypt	1
Lebanon	1

In their annual violent crime index for the year 2001, the FBI recorded the deaths from the attacks as murder, in separate tables so as not to mix them with other reported crimes for that year. In a disclaimer, the FBI stated that "the number of deaths is so great that combining it with the traditional crime statistics will have an outlier effect that falsely skews all types of measurements in the program's analyses." New York City also did not include the deaths in their annual crime statistics for 2001.

=== CIA ===
In 2004, John L. Helgerson, the Inspector General of the Central Intelligence Agency (CIA), conducted an internal review of the agency's pre-9/11 performance and was harshly critical of senior CIA officials for not doing everything possible to confront terrorism. According to Philip Giraldi in The American Conservative, Helgerson criticized their failure to stop two of the 9/11 hijackers, Nawaf al-Hazmi and Khalid al-Mihdhar, as they entered the United States and their failure to share information on the two men with the FBI.

In May 2007, senators from both major U.S. political parties (the Republican and Democratic parties) drafted legislation to make the review public. One of the backers, Senator Ron Wyden said, "The American people have a right to know what the Central Intelligence Agency was doing in those critical months before 9/11." The report was released in 2009 by President Barack Obama.

=== Congressional inquiry ===
In February 2002, the Senate Select Committee on Intelligence and the House Permanent Select Committee on Intelligence formed a joint inquiry into the performance of the U.S. Intelligence Community. Their 832-page report released in December 2002 detailed failings of the FBI and CIA to use available information, including about terrorists the CIA knew were in the United States, to disrupt the plots. The joint inquiry developed its information about possible involvement of Saudi Arabian government officials from non-classified sources. The Bush administration demanded 28 related pages remain classified.

In December 2002, the inquiry's chair Bob Graham revealed in an interview that there was "evidence that there were foreign governments involved in facilitating the activities of at least some of the terrorists in the United States." Victim families were frustrated by the unanswered questions and redacted material from the congressional inquiry and demanded an independent commission. September 11 victim families, members of Congress and the Saudi Arabian government are still seeking the release of the documents. In June 2016, CIA chief John Brennan said that he believes 28 redacted pages of a congressional inquiry into 9/11 will soon be made public, and that they will prove that the government of Saudi Arabia had no involvement in the September 11 attacks.

In September 2016, Congress passed the Justice Against Sponsors of Terrorism Act that would allow relatives of victims of the September 11 attacks to sue Saudi Arabia for its government's alleged role in the attacks.

=== 9/11 Commission ===
The National Commission on Terrorist Attacks Upon the United States, popularly known as the 9/11 Commission, chaired by Thomas Kean, (Note: Former Secretary of State Henry Kissinger was initially appointed to head the commission but resigned only weeks after being appointed, to avoid conflicts of interest. Former U.S. Senator George Mitchell was originally appointed as the vice chairman, but he stepped down on December 10, 2002, not wanting to sever ties to his law firm. On December 15, 2002, Bush appointed former New Jersey governor Thomas Kean to head the commission.) was formed in late 2002 to prepare a thorough account of the circumstances surrounding the attacks, including preparedness for and the immediate response to the attacks. The commission issued the 9/11 Commission Report in July 2004, a 585-page report based on its investigations. The report detailed the events leading up to the attacks, concluding that they were carried out by al-Qaeda. The commission also examined how security and intelligence agencies were inadequately coordinated to prevent the attacks.

According to the report, "We believe the 9/11 attacks revealed four kinds of failures: in imagination, policy, capabilities, and management." The commission made numerous recommendations on how to prevent future attacks, and in 2011 was dismayed that several of its recommendations had yet to be implemented.

=== National Institute of Standards and Technology ===
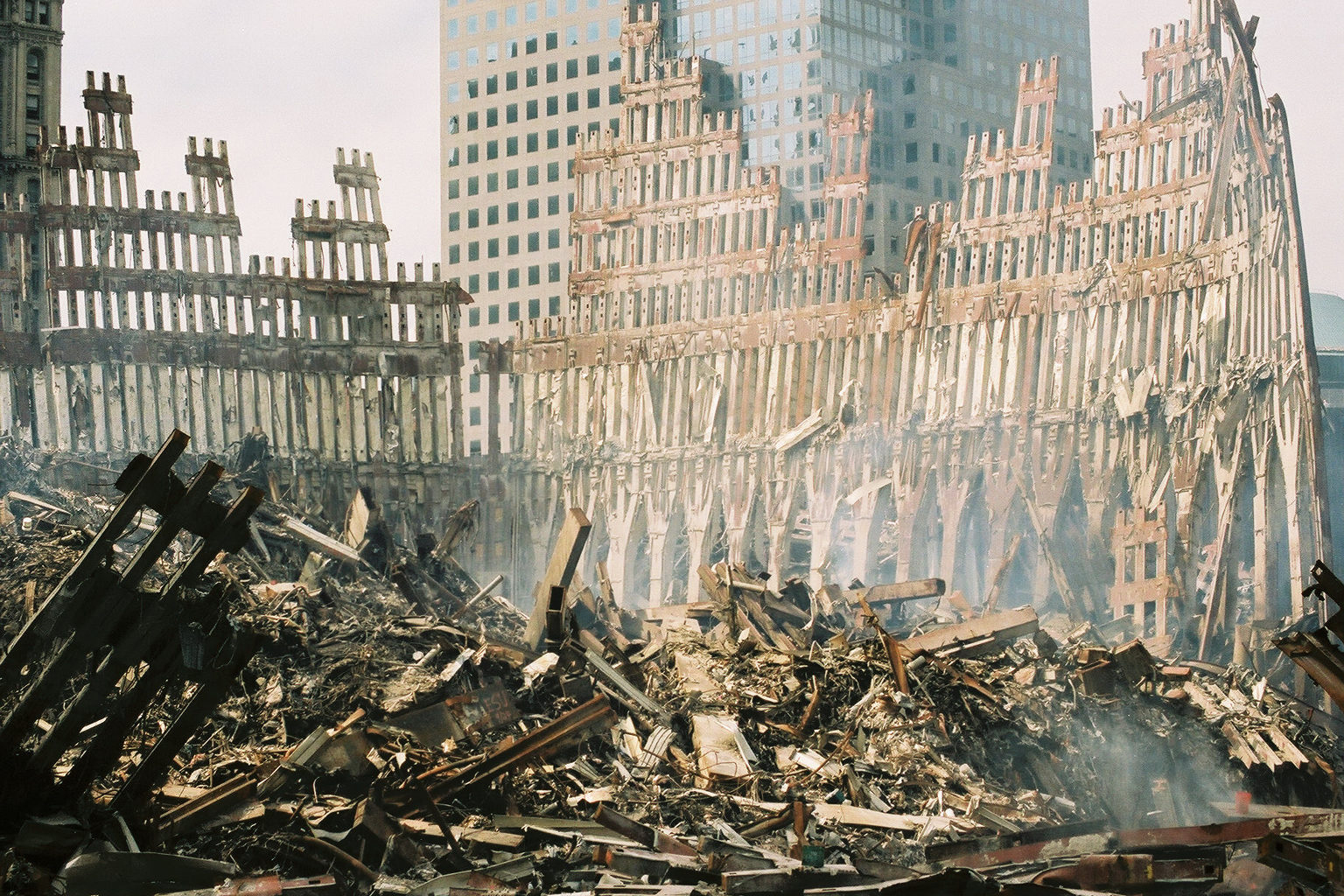
The exterior support columns from the South Tower remained standing after the building collapsed

The U.S. National Institute of Standards and Technology investigated the collapses of the Twin Towers and 7 WTC. The investigations examined why the buildings collapsed and what fire protection measures were in place, and evaluated how fire protection systems might be improved in future construction. The investigation into the collapse of 1 WTC and 2 WTC was concluded in October 2005 and that of 7 WTC was completed in August 2008.

NIST found that the fireproofing on the Twin Towers' steel infrastructures was blown off by the initial impact of the planes and that had this not occurred, the towers likely would have remained standing. A 2007 study of the north tower's collapse published by researchers at Purdue University determined that since the plane's impact had stripped off much of the structure's thermal insulation, the heat from a typical office fire would have softened and weakened the exposed girders and columns enough to initiate the collapse regardless of the number of columns cut or damaged by the impact.

The director of the original investigation stated that "the towers did amazingly well. The terrorist aircraft didn't bring the buildings down; it was the fire that followed. It was proven that you could take out two-thirds of the columns in a tower and the building would still stand." The fires weakened the trusses supporting the floors, making the floors sag. The sagging floors pulled on the exterior steel columns causing the exterior columns to bow inward.

With the damage to the core columns, the buckling exterior columns could no longer support the buildings, causing them to collapse. Additionally, the report found the towers' stairwells were not properly reinforced to provide adequate emergency escape for people above the impact zones. NIST concluded that uncontrolled fires in 7 WTC caused floor beams and girders to heat and subsequently "caused a critical support column to fail, initiating a fire-induced progressive collapse that brought the building down."

=== Alleged Saudi government role ===
The Obama administration released a document compiled by U.S. investigators Dana Lesemann and Michael Jacobson, known as "File 17," which contains a list naming three dozen people, including the suspected Saudi intelligence officers attached to Saudi Arabia's embassy in Washington, D.C., which connects Saudi Arabia to the hijackers.

Congress passed the Justice Against Sponsors of Terrorism Act. The practical effect of the legislation was to allow the continuation of a longstanding civil lawsuit brought by families of victims of the September 11 attacks against Saudi Arabia for its government's alleged role in the attacks. A U.S. judge formally allowed a suit to move forward against the government of Saudi Arabia brought by 9/11 survivors and victims' families.

The families of some 9/11 victims obtained two videos and a notepad seized from Saudi national Omar al-Bayoumi by the British courts. The first video showed him hosting a party in San Diego for Nawaf al-Hazmi and Khalid al-Mihdhar, the first two hijackers to arrive in the U.S. The other video showed al-Bayoumi greeting the cleric Anwar al-Awlaki, who was blamed for radicalizing Americans and later killed in a CIA drone strike. The notepad depicted a hand-drawn airplane and some mathematical equations that, according to a pilot's court statement, might have been used to calculate the rate of descent to get to a target. According to a 2017 FBI memo, from the late 1990s until the 9/11 attack, al-Bayoumi was a paid cooptee of the Saudi General Intelligence Presidency. As of April 2022 he is believed to be living in Saudi Arabia, which has denied any involvement in 9/11.

== Rebuilding and memorials ==
=== Reconstruction ===
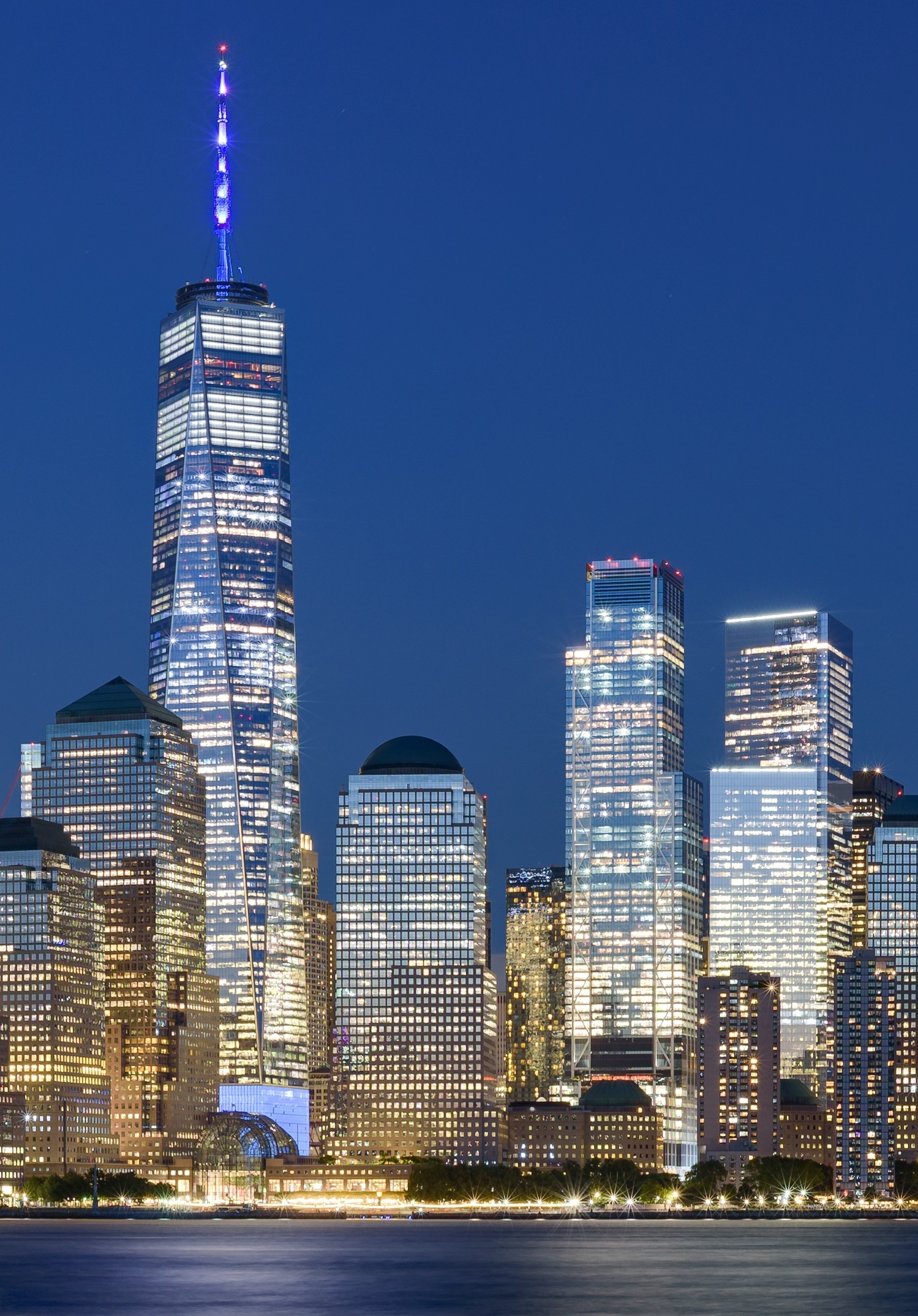
The rebuilt World Trade Center, September 2020

Within hours of the attack, a search and rescue operation was launched. After months of around-the-clock operations, the World Trade Center site was cleared by the end of May 2002. The damaged section of the Pentagon was rebuilt and occupied within a year of the attacks. The temporary World Trade Center PATH station opened in late 2003 and construction of the new 7 World Trade Center was completed in 2006. Work on rebuilding the main World Trade Center site was delayed until late 2006 when leaseholder Larry Silverstein and the Port Authority of New York and New Jersey agreed on financing. The construction of One World Trade Center began in April 2006, and reached its full height in May 2013. The spire was installed atop the building at that date, putting One WTC's height at 1,776 feet (541 m), making it the tallest building in the Western Hemisphere. One WTC finished construction and opened on November 3, 2014.

On the World Trade Center site, three more office towers were to be built one block east of where the original towers stood. 4 WTC, meanwhile, opened in November 2013, making it the second tower on the site to open behind 7 World Trade Center, as well as the first building on the Port Authority property. 3 WTC opened in June 2018, becoming the fourth skyscraper at the site to be completed. In December 2022, the Nicholas Greek Orthodox Church fully reopened for regular services, followed by the opening of the Ronald O. Perelman Performing Arts Center in September 2023. With construction beginning in 2008, 2 World Trade Center remains as of 2026 unfinished. Scale models of the building were publicly revealed in September 2024, although Silverstein Properties was still trying to secure funding for the tower at the time.

=== Memorials ===
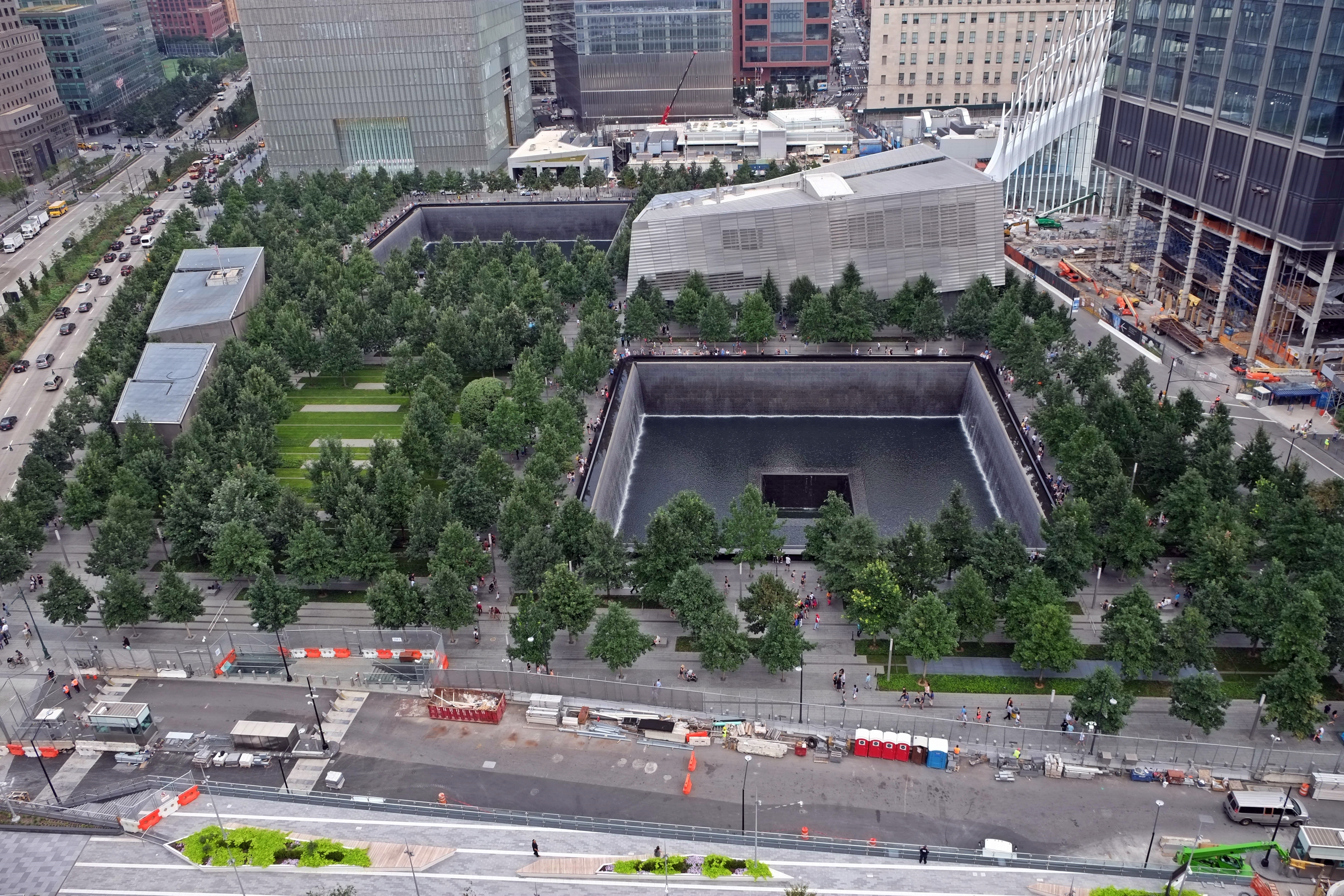
The National September 11 Memorial and Museum in Lower Manhattan, August 2016

In the days following the attacks, many memorials and vigils were held around the world, and photographs of the dead and missing were posted around Ground Zero. A witness described being unable to "get away from faces of innocent victims who were killed. Their pictures are everywhere, on phone booths, street lights, and walls of subway stations. Everything reminded me of a huge funeral, people were quiet and sad, but also very nice. Before, New York gave me a cold feeling; now people were reaching out to help each other." President Bush proclaimed Friday, September 14, 2001, as Patriot Day.

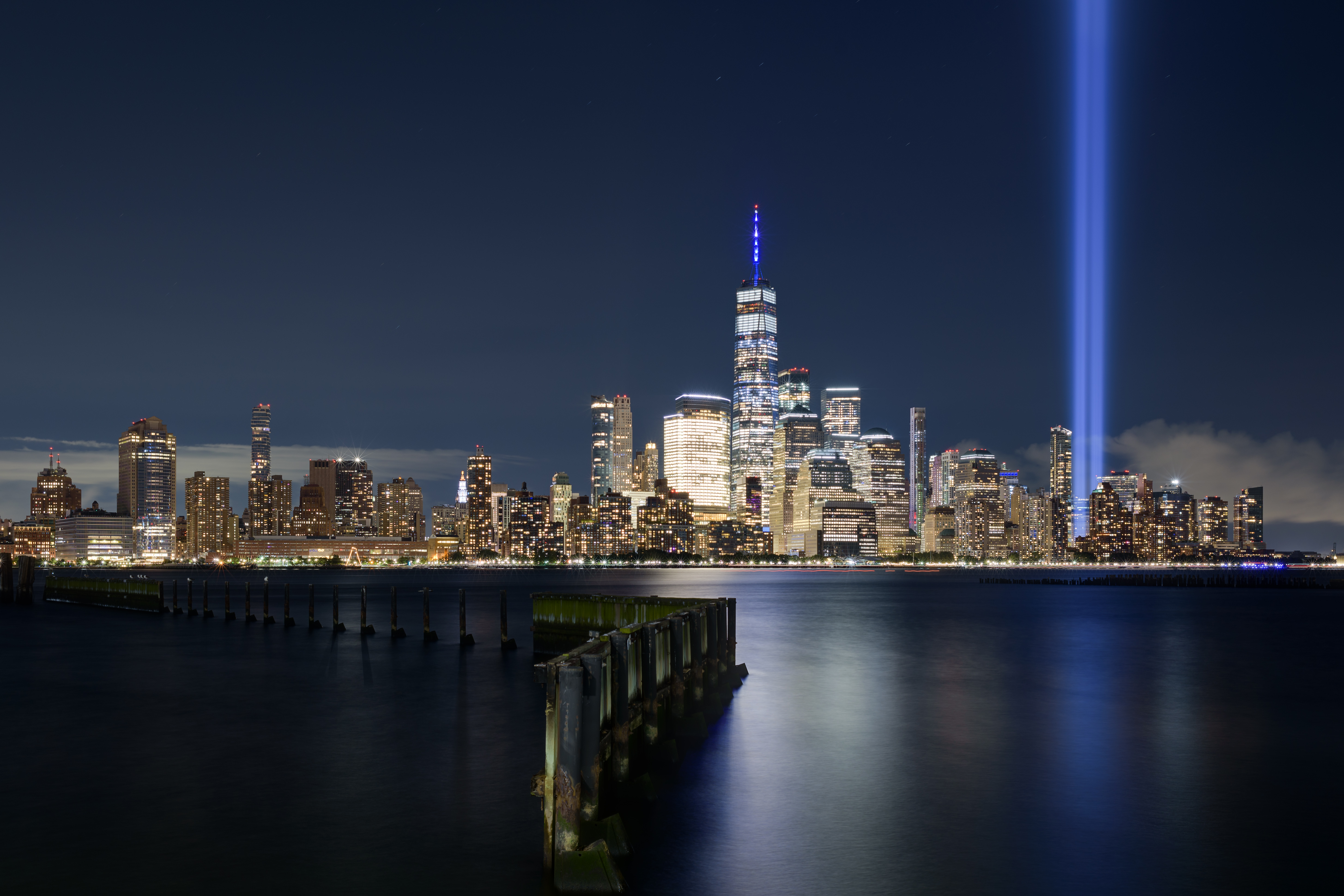
Tribute in Light, featuring two columns of light representing the Twin Towers, September 2020

One of the first memorials was the Tribute in Light, an installation of 88 searchlights at the footprints of the World Trade Center towers. In New York City, the World Trade Center Site Memorial Competition was held to design an appropriate memorial on the site. The winning design, Reflecting Absence, was selected in August 2006, and consists of a pair of reflecting pools in the footprints of the towers, surrounded by a list of the victims' names in an underground memorial space. The memorial was completed on the 10th anniversary of the attacks in 2011; a museum also opened on site in May 2014.

The Sphere by the German sculptor Fritz Koenig is the world's largest bronze sculpture of modern times, and stood between the Twin Towers on the Austin J. Tobin Plaza from 1971 until the attacks. The sculpture, weighing more than 20 tons, was the only remaining work of art to be recovered largely intact from the ruins of the towers. Since then, the work of art, known in the U.S. as The Sphere, has been transformed into a symbolic monument of 9/11 commemoration. After being dismantled and stored near a hangar at John F. Kennedy International Airport, the sculpture was the subject of the 2001 documentary The Sphere by filmmaker Percy Adlon. In August 2017, the work was installed at Liberty Park, close to the new World Trade Center aerial and the 9/11 Memorial.

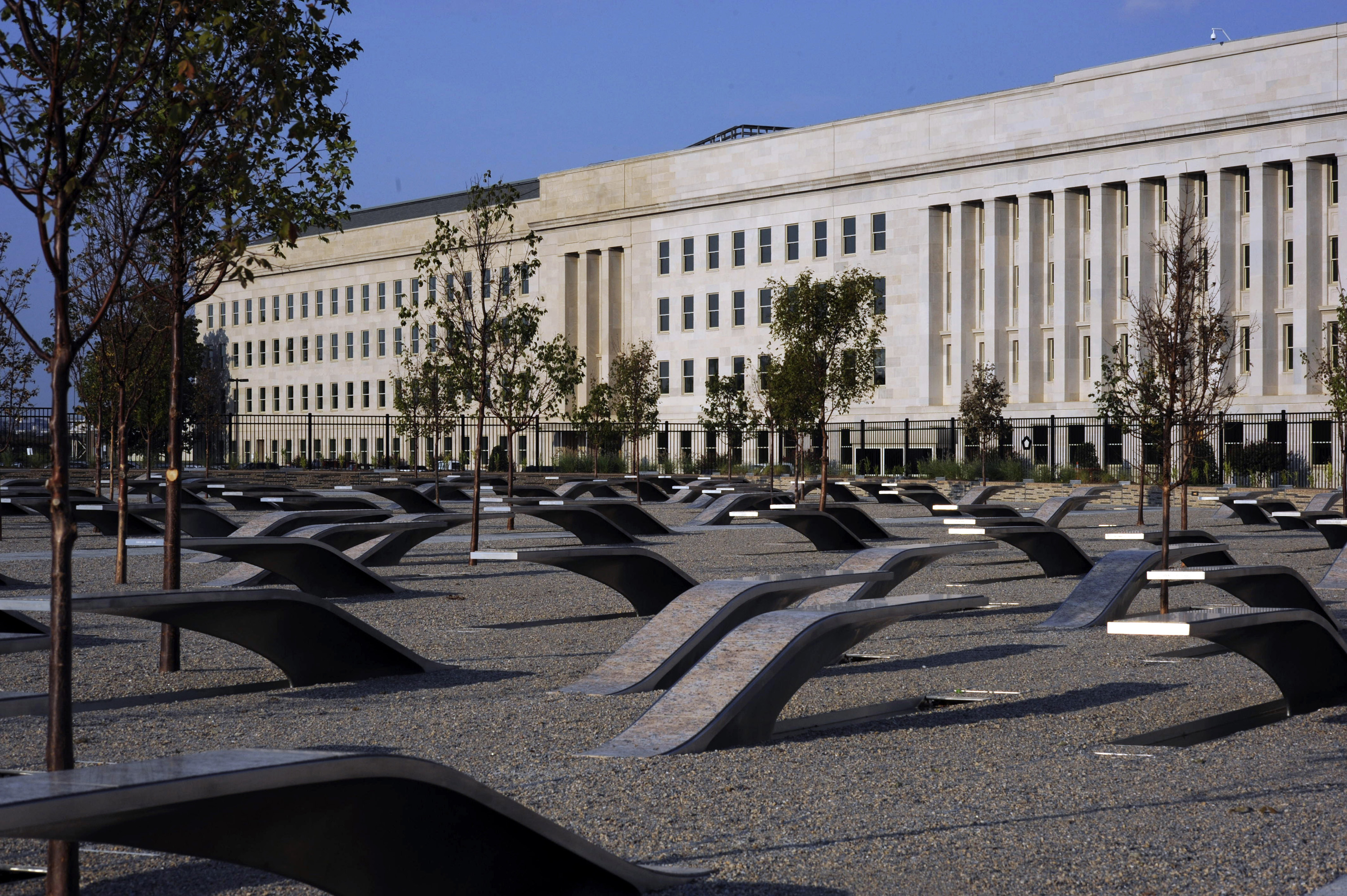
The National 9/11 Pentagon Memorial in Arlington County, Virginia, September 2008

In Arlington County, the Pentagon Memorial was completed and opened to the public on the seventh anniversary of the attacks in 2008. It consists of a landscaped park with 184 benches facing the Pentagon. When the Pentagon was repaired in 2001–2002, a private chapel and indoor memorial were included at the area where Flight 77 crashed into the building.

In Shanksville, a concrete-and-glass visitor center was opened in 2015, situated on a hill overlooking the crash site and the white marble Wall of Names. An observation platform at the visitor center and the white marble wall are both aligned beneath the path of Flight 93. New York City firefighters donated a cross made of steel from the World Trade Center and mounted on top of a platform shaped like the Pentagon. It was installed outside the firehouse on August 25, 2008. Many other permanent memorials are elsewhere. Scholarships and charities have been established by the victims' families and by many other organizations and private figures.

On every anniversary in New York City, the names of the victims who died there are read out over music. The President of the United States attends a memorial service at the Pentagon, and asks Americans to observe Patriot Day with a moment of silence. Smaller services are held in Shanksville, Pennsylvania, which are usually attended by the First Lady. In 2023, Joe Biden did not attend services in the affected areas, instead marking the day in Anchorage, Alaska, the only U.S. president to do so since the attacks.

== See also ==
- Attacks on the United States and terrorism in the United States
  - Attack on Pearl Harbor – Previously the deadliest attack on US soil
  - Oklahoma City bombing – 1995 terrorist attack in Oklahoma City
- Air India Flight 182 – 1985 aircraft bombing over the Atlantic Ocean
- Kamikaze – Japanese use of deliberate plane crashes as suicide attacks during World War II
- Khobar Towers bombing – 1996 terrorist attack in Khobar, Saudi Arabia
- Korean 085 – Another flight that was falsely suspected of being hijacked as part of the September 11 attacks
- Tokyo subway sarin attack – 1995 terrorist attack by Aum Shinrikyo
- Beslan school siege – 2004 Russian hostage crisis and massacre
- USS Cole bombing – 2000 suicide attack by al-Qaeda
- 1973 Chilean coup d'état – sometimes known as the other 9/11
- 2008 Mumbai attacks – Islamist terror attacks in Mumbai, India

=== Lists ===
- List of aviation incidents involving terrorism
- List of cultural references to the September 11 attacks
- List of deadliest terrorist attacks in the United States
- List of Islamist terrorist attacks
- List of major terrorist incidents
- List of terrorist incidents in 2001
- List of terrorist incidents in New York City
- List of unsuccessful terrorist plots in the United States post-9/11

=== Timelines ===
- Timeline of al-Qaeda attacks
- Timeline of the September 11 attacks

== Bibliography ==
- "'We Have Some Planes': Inside the Four Flights" (PDF). 9/11 Commission Report (Report). National Commission on Terrorist Attacks Upon the United States. 2004.
- Alavosius, Mark P.; Rodriquez, Nischal J. (2005). "Unity of Purpose/Unity of effort: Private-Sector Preparedness in Times of Terror". Disaster Prevention and Management. 14 (5): 666. Bibcode:2005DisPM..14..666A. doi:10.1108/09653560510634098.
- "American Airlines Flight 77 FDR Report" (PDF). National Transportation Safety Board. January 31, 2002.
- Averill, Jason D. (2005). Final Reports of the Federal Building and Fire Investigation of the World Trade Center Disaster (PDF) (Report). National Institute of Standards and Technology (NIST). Archived from the original (PDF) on May 9, 2009.
- Bergen, Peter L. (2001). Holy War, Inc.: Inside the Secret World of Osama Bin Laden. Simon & Schuster. ISBN 978-0-7432-3467-2.
- Bergen, Peter (2006). The Osama Bin Laden I Know: An Oral History of Al Qaeda's Leader. Simon & Schuster. ISBN 978-0-7432-9592-5. OCLC 1245630388.
- Berner, Brad (2007). The World According to Al Qaeda. Peacock. ISBN 978-81-248-0114-7. OCLC 213883522.
- Bodnar, John. Divided by Terror: American Patriotism after 9/11 (University of North Carolina Press, 2021)
- Clarke, Richard (2004). Against All Enemies: Inside America's War on Terror. New York: Free Press. ISBN 978-0-7432-6024-4.
- Dwyer, Jim; Flynn, Kevin (2005). 102 Minutes. Times. ISBN 978-0-8050-7682-0.
- Final Report on the Collapse of World Trade Center Building 7 (Report). National Institute of Standards and Technology. November 2008.
- "Flight Path Study – American Airlines Flight 77" (PDF). National Transportation Safety Board. February 19, 2002.
- Fouda, Yosri; Fielding, Nick (2004). Masterminds of Terror: The Truth Behind the Most Devastating Terrorist Attack the World Has Ever Seen. Arcade. ISBN 978-1-55970-717-6.
- Goldberg, Alfred; et al. (2007). Pentagon 9/11. Washington, D.C.: Government Printing Office. ISBN 978-0-16-078328-9.
- Graff, Garrett M. (2019). The Only Plane in the Sky: An Oral History of 9/11. New York: Avid Reader. ISBN 978-1-5011-8220-4.
- Gunaratna, Ronan (2002). Inside Al Qaeda: global network of terror. Columbia University Press. ISBN 978-0-231-12692-2.
- Holmes, Stephen (2006). "Al Qaeda, September 11, 2001". In Gambetta, Diego (ed.). Making sense of suicide missions. Oxford University Press. ISBN 978-0-19-929797-9.
- Ibrahim, Raymond; bin Laden, Osama (2007). The Al Qaeda reader. Random House. ISBN 978-0-385-51655-6.
- Javorsek, Daniel II; Rose, John; Marshall, Christopher; Leitner, Peter (August 5, 2015). "A Formal Risk-Effectiveness Analysis Proposal for the Compartmentalized Intelligence Security Structure". International Journal of Intelligence and CounterIntelligence. 28 (4): 734–761. doi:10.1080/08850607.2015.1051830. S2CID 152911592.
- Jessee, Devin (2006). "Tactical Means, Strategic Ends: Al Qaeda's Use of Denial and Deception" (PDF). International Journal of Intelligence and CounterIntelligence. 18 (3): 367–388. doi:10.1080/09546550600751941. S2CID 144349098. Archived (PDF) from the original on November 21, 2021.
- Kelley, Christopher (2006). Executing the Constitution: putting the president back into the Constitution. SUNY Press. ISBN 978-0-7914-6727-5.
- Keppel, Gilles; Milelli, Jean-Pierre; Ghazaleh, Pascale (2008). Al Qaeda in its own words. Harvard University Press. ISBN 978-0-674-02804-3.
- Lawrence, Bruce (2005). Messages to the world: the statements of Osama Bin Laden. Verso. ISBN 978-1-84467-045-1.
- Martin, Gus (2011). The SAGE Encyclopedia of Terrorism, Second Edition. Sage. ISBN 978-1-4129-8017-3.
- McDermott, Terry (2005). Perfect Soldiers: The 9/11 Hijackers. HarperCollins. pp. 191–192. ISBN 978-0-06-058470-2.
- "McKinsey Report". FDNY / McKinsey & Company. August 9, 2002. Archived from the original on June 3, 2010.
- Mearsheimer, John J. (2007). The Israel Lobby and U.S. Foreign Policy. Macmillan. ISBN 978-0-374-17772-0.
- Murdico, Suzanne (2003). Osama Bin Laden. Rosen. ISBN 978-0-8239-4467-5.
- "The Pentagon Building Performance Report" (PDF). American Society of Civil Engineers (ASCE). January 2003. Archived from the original (PDF) on July 21, 2011.
- Summers, Anthony; Swan, Robbyn (2011). The Eleventh Day: The Full Story of 9/11 and Osama Bin Laden. New York: Ballantine. ISBN 978-1-4000-6659-9.
- Sunder, Shyam S. (September 2005). Final Report on the Collapse of the World Trade Center Towers. National Institute of Standards and Technology. NIST NCSTAR 1.
- "World Trade Center Building Performance Study – Bankers Trust Building" (PDF). Federal Emergency Management Agency. May 2002.
- "World Trade Center Building Performance Study – Peripheral Buildings" (PDF). Federal Emergency Management Agency. May 2002.
- "World Trade Center Building Performance Study" (PDF). Federal Emergency Management Agency. 2002.
- Wright, Lawrence (2006). The Looming Tower: Al-Qaeda and the Road to 9/11. New York: Alfred A. Knopf. ISBN 978-0-375-41486-2. OCLC 232254274.
- Yitzhak, Ronen (Summer 2016). "The War Against Terrorism and For Stability of the Hashemite Regime: Jordanian Intelligence Challenges in the 21st Century". International Journal of Intelligence and CounterIntelligence. 29 (2): 213–235. doi:10.1080/08850607.2016.1121038. S2CID 155138286.
