= Timeline of the September 11 attacks =

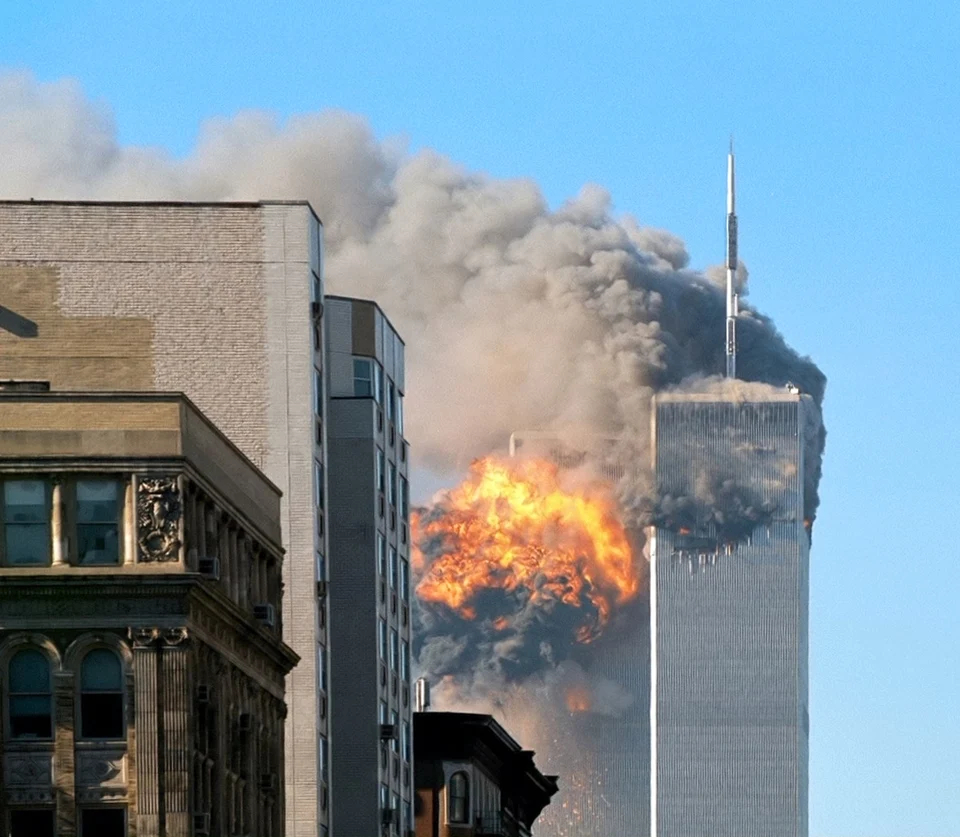
United Airlines Flight 175 crashes into the South Tower of the World Trade Center in New York City during the September 11 attacks.

The following timeline is a chronological list of all the major events leading up to, during, and following the September 11 attacks against the United States in 2001, through the first anniversary of the attacks in 2002.

== Background history ==
Day	Month	Year(s)	Location	Notes
-	-	1950	Egypt	Sayyid Qutb returns to Egypt from a two-year visit to the United States sponsored by the Ministry of Education, and joins the Muslim Brotherhood due to his disgust towards American culture.
-	-	1951-1965		Qutb writes the book Fi Zilal al-Quran while in prison for an assassination attempt against Gamal Abdel Nasser. The book claims that Israel and the Arab states of the Persian Gulf are American satellite states and calls for an Islamist revolution against secularism—including Arab nationalism, socialism, and liberal democracy—to establish a Middle Eastern theocracy rooted in sharia law. The book also concludes that any Muslims who support secularism are kuffar. The book becomes highly influential towards Islamic terrorists.
-	-	1966	Egypt	Sayyid Qutb is executed in Egypt and his brother Muhammad Qutb flees to Saudi Arabia, acquiring a teaching position at King Abdulaziz University in Jeddah.
-	-	1973	Lower Manhattan in New York City, United States	Work is completed on the original World Trade Center.
-	-	1976	Jeddah, Saudi Arabia	Osama bin Laden, son of Saudi billionaire businessman Mohammed bin Laden, is radicalized by Qutb while attending King Abdulaziz University for business administration.
-	-	1979	United States	The United States first becomes concerned over Islamic extremism after the Iranian Revolution, the Iran hostage crisis, and the Grand Mosque seizure.
-	-	1980	Jeddah, Saudi Arabia	Bin Laden completes university.
-	-	1980	Pakistan	Bin Laden travels to Pakistan to volunteer and assist the Sunni Mujahideen during the Soviet–Afghan War. He will become increasingly radicalised over the course of his participation in the conflict.
-	-	1981		Bin Laden's future deputy Ayman al-Zawahiri, the leader of Jama At al-Jihad, is arrested for his role in the assassination of Anwar Sadat and imprisoned for three years.
-	-	1983	United States Marine Corps barracks, Beirut Airport 'Drakkar' barracks of French 1st Parachute Chasseur Regiment and 9th Parachute Chasseur Regiment, Ramlet al Baida, Beirut	The 1983 Beirut barracks bombings targeting the Multinational Force in Lebanon during the Lebanese Civil War provides inspiration for Bin Laden.
-	Oct	1984	Republic of Afghanistan (1978–1992) and Pakistan	Bin Laden cofounds a network, the Maktab al-Khidamat, with Abdullah Yusuf Azzam in Afghanistan and Pakistan to recruit Muslims for the Afghan resistance.
-	-	1986	Republic of Afghanistan (1978–1992)	Bin Laden travels to Afghanistan to lead MAK forces in combat.
-	Feb	1987	Republic of Afghanistan (1978–1992)	Al-Qaeda establishes its first training camps in Afghanistan.
25	May	1987	Paktia Province, Republic of Afghanistan (1978–1992)	Bin Laden withstands a Soviet attack during the Battle of Jaji, establishing his reputation in the Arab world.
8	Dec	1987	Israel and Occupied Palestinian Territory	The First Intifada begins in Palestine. Bin Laden expresses vocal support for the conflict, and begins to advocate in favor of jihad against the West.
-	-	1988		Osama bin Laden forms a computer database of Islamist militants, founding Al-Qaeda. He declares that Muslims must protect the holy sites of Mecca and Medina from foreign control as a religious duty.
15	Feb	1989	Republic of Afghanistan (1978–1992)	The Soviet Army completes its withdrawal from Afghanistan, and bin Laden advocates transforming al-Qaeda into a global network to fund jihad. Azzam prefers to focus on the Afghan Civil War and the Israeli–Palestinian conflict.
-	May-June	1989	Jalalabad, Republic of Afghanistan (1978–1992)	Al-Qaeda forces are badly defeated by the Afghan National Army in the Battle of Jalalabad, leading to a drop in membership and reorientation of tactics.
30	Jun	1989	Sudan, North Africa	Omar al-Bashir and Hassan Al-Turabi's National Islamic Front seize control of Sudan in a coup d'état. Al-Turabi would invite bin Laden to stay in the country.
-	Nov	1989	Saudi Arabia	Bin Laden returns to Saudi Arabia and Prince Turki bin Faisal rejects his offer to send al-Qaeda to overthrow the Communist government in South Yemen.
24	Nov	1989	Peshawar, Pakistan	Azzam is assassinated in a car bombing, allowing bin Laden to dominate the organization.
22	May	1990	South and North Yemen	The governments of South and North Yemen merge into the unified Republic of Yemen. Bin Laden runs afoul of the Saudi Interior Ministry for attempting to violently disrupt the unification process.
2	Aug	1990	Kuwait, West Asia	Ba'athist Iraq invades and annexes Kuwait. Fearing an Iraqi threat to Eastern Province oilfields, King Fahd rapidly accepts American military assistance to the opposition of bin Laden.
-	Sept	1990		Bin Laden makes an offer to Sultan bin Abdulaziz Al Saud to defend Saudi Arabia from Ba'athist Iraq with 100,000 fighters after the Iraqi invasion of Kuwait. He is turned down, and becomes embittered by the intervention of non-Islamic troops from the U.S.-led international coalition in the Gulf War.
5	Nov	1990	New York Marriott East Side, Midtown Manhattan, New York City	El Sayyid Nosair commits the assassination of Meir Kahane at the New York Marriott East Side, one of the first Islamist terrorist attacks in the United States. The FBI subsequently finds documents linking the attack to al-Qaeda, making it the organization's first involvement in attacks in the United States.
-	Apr	1991	Sudan, East Africa	Bin Laden moves to Sudan and begins expanding al-Qaeda using legitimate businesses as front organizations.
-	-	1992	Arabian Peninsula and Horn of Africa	Bin Laden begins to target U.S. military forces in the Arabian Peninsula and the Horn of Africa, as well as to consider alliances with Shiite Iranian-backed organizations such as Hezbollah.
27	Apr	1992	Republic of Afghanistan (1978–1992)	The Democratic Republic of Afghanistan collapses after Hezb-e Islami Gulbuddin seizes Kabul, but a new stage of civil war begins when the Peshawar Accords collapse.
29	Dec	1992	Aden, Yemen, West Asia	Al-Qaeda attacks U.S. military forces for the first time in the Yemen hotel bombings in Aden.
26	Feb	1993	World Trade Center, New York City, New York, U.S.	Ramzi Yousef carries out the 1993 World Trade Center bombing.
3-4	Oct	1993	Mogadishu, Somalia, Horn of Africa	18 American servicemen are killed by al-Qaeda-trained forces in the Battle of Mogadishu.
9	Apr	1994		Bin Laden's Saudi citizenship is revoked.
-	Sept	1994	Kandahar, Kandahar Province, Islamic State of Afghanistan	Mohammed Omar founds the Taliban in Kandahar.
11	Dec	1994	Minami Daito Island, Okinawa, Japan	Philippine Airlines Flight 434 is exploded mid-air over the Philippine Sea where Ramzi Yousef planted a bomb on a first leg of the journey that would lead a test of a planned Operation Bojinka plot.
24-26	Dec	1994	Houari Boumediene Airport, Algiers, Algeria and Marseille Provence Airport, Marseille, France	Armed Islamic Group of Algeria militants attempt to crash Air France Flight 8969 into the Eiffel Tower, influencing al-Qaeda's future planning.
6	Jan	1995	Doña Josefa apartments in Manila, Philippines	Operation Bojinka is discovered by the Filipino police in Manila on a laptop computer in an apartment after a fire. This foils the scheduled World Youth Day 1995 being held in Manila and attempted airline bombings.
7	Feb	1995	Pakistan	Ramzi Yousef is arrested in Pakistan, and is discovered to have financial links to Bin Laden.
-	Jun	1995		U.S. intelligence links al-Qaeda to an unsuccessful assassination attempt against Egyptian President Hosni Mubarak in Addis Ababa, Ethiopia.
8	Jan	1996		As bin Laden makes bellicose statements regarding United States and Saudi Arabia. Michael Scheuer creates a CIA unit, the Bin Laden Issue Station, to gather intelligence on Bin Laden.
18	May	1996	Islamic State of Afghanistan	Heading from Africa to Asia, bin Laden moves to Afghanistan providing him a safe haven for al-Qaeda activities.
25	Jun	1996	Khobar Towers, Khobar, Saudi Arabia	Al-Qaeda commits the Khobar Towers bombing targeting American servicemen in Saudi Arabia to participate in Operation Southern Watch.
23	Aug	1996		Bin Ladin issues a fatwa declaring war on the United States, which is published in the Arabic-language newspaper Al-Quds Al-Arabi in London. The FBI and the U.S. Attorney for the Southern District of New York open a criminal file on him under the charge of seditious conspiracy.
27	Sept	1996	Islamic Emirate of Afghanistan	The Taliban, a radical Islamic movement, rises to power by conquering Kabul and declares the Islamic Emirate of Afghanistan.
-	Nov	1996		Informant Jamal al-Fadl reveals the existence of al-Qaeda to the FBI.
23	Nov	1996	Grande Comore, Comoros	Attackers hijack Ethiopian Airlines Flight 961 and most of the passengers die in the resulting crash landing.
-	-	1998	Hamburg, Germany	9/11 hijacker Mohamed Atta and associates are monitored some by US and Germany in their Hamburg apartment.
-	Feb	1998		Bin Laden expands religious edict against US and allies by issuing a second fatwa calling on Muslims to join a jihad against Jews and Christians until the United States and Israel evacuate the Middle East, and reiterates the themes in a televised interview with ABC News.
8	Jun	1998		A U.S. grand jury delivers a sealed indictment of bin Laden for "conspiracy to attack defense utilities of the United States."
7	Aug	1998	Nairobi, Kenya and Dar es Salaam, Tanzania	The 1998 U.S. embassy bombings in Kenya and Tanzania bring al-Qaeda to US public attention for the first time.
8-10	Aug	1998	Mazar-i-Sharif, Balkh, Islamic Emirate of Afghanistan	In Mazar-i-Sharif, the Taliban and Al Qaeda's 055 Brigade massacre between 4,000 and 8,000 people, including 11 Iranian diplomats. Iran threatens to intervene, but relents after mediation by the United Nations.
20	Aug	1998	Islamic Emirate of Afghanistan	Operation Infinite Reach, U.S. cruise missile strikes an Al-Qaeda training camp in Khost, Afghanistan, in retaliation of Al-Qaeda's U.S. embassy bombings two weeks earlier.
8	Oct	1999	United States	Al-Qaeda is designated as a Foreign Terrorist Organisation by the U.S. State Department. The Federal Aviation Administration instructs airlines to maintain "a high degree of alertness" against the organization.
15	Oct	1999	New York City, New York, United States	The United Nations Security Council passes a resolution demanding that the Taliban extradite bin Ladin.
31	Oct	1999	Atlantic Ocean, 100 km (62 mi; 54 nmi) south of Nantucket	Suicide pilot crashes EgyptAir Flight 990 into the ocean.
-	Nov-Dec	1999		The 2000 millennium attack plots for bombings in Jordan and Los Angeles International Airport are discovered and prevented.
24	Dec	1999	Hijacked in Indian airspace between Kathmandu, Nepal and Delhi, India; landed at Amritsar, India; Lahore, Pakistan; Dubai, United Arab Emirates; and Kandahar, Afghanistan.	Indian Airlines Flight 814 hijacked. One passenger dies while the others are released.
12	Oct	2000	Yemen, West Africa	The USS Cole is bombed in Yemen by Al-Qaeda.
10	Jul	2001		FBI Agent Kenneth Williams writes a memo warning that al-Qaeda members are training at flight schools in the United States, and CIA Director George Tenet briefs officials such as National Security Advisor Condoleezza Rice.
19	Jul	2001		At the G8 summit in Genoa, anti-aircraft missile batteries were installed following intelligence reports that Osama bin Laden would try to crash a plane into a building to kill George Bush.
6	Aug	2001		President George W. Bush receives the President's Daily Brief Bin Ladin Determined To Strike in US warning of an imminent attack on the United States by al-Qaeda.
4	Sept	2001		The United States National Security Council prepares a $200 million plan to aid opponents of the Taliban in the Afghan Civil War, but it is not presented to President Bush.
9	Sept	Khwājah Bahā ud Dīn (Khvājeh Bahāuḏḏīn), Takhar Province in northeastern Afghanistan	Al-Qaeda assassinates Ahmad Shah Massoud, commander of the Northern Alliance.	

== Planning ==
Day	Month	Year(s)	Location	Notes
-	-	1992	Germany	Mohamed Atta arrives in Germany.
-	-	1994	Philippines	Planning on Operation Bojinka begins.
-	-	1995	Germany	Operation Bojinka foiled, Said Bahaji and Ramzi bin al-Shibh arrive in Germany.
-	-	1996	Germany	Marwan al-Shehhi and Ziad Jarrah arrive in Germany.
-	-	1997	Germany	Zakariyah Essabar arrives in Germany.
-	-	1998	Germany	Recruitment of terrorists in Germany starts.
4	Dec	1998	United States	Bill Clinton warned bin Laden preparing to hijack US aircraft' inside US.
-	-	1999	Hamburg, Germany	Hamburg cell is fully formed.
-	-	1999	Germany	German authorities monitors call to 9/11 hijacker al-Shehhi, shares information with CIA.
-	-	1999	Germany	Germans monitor call mentioning key al-Qaeda Hamburg cell members, including 9/11 hijacker Atta's full name and number.
-	-	1999		9/11 hijacker Jarrah has unofficial wedding; photograph later suggests German intelligence has informant.
-	-	1999		Three 9/11 hijackers obtain US visas.
15	Apr	1999		Hani Hanjour obtains pilot's license despite dubious skills.
-	-	1999	Germany	German intelligence records calls between 9/11 hijacker al-Shehhi and others linked to al-Qaeda.
-	-	1999	United States	President Clinton warned about al-Qaeda operatives living in US.
-	-	1999		Watch list importance is stressed but procedures are not followed.
-	-	1999	United States	NSA tells CIA about planned al-Qaeda summit involving future hijackers.
-	-	2000	Malaysia and United States	2000 al-Qaeda Summit in Malaysia, pilots head to the United States and attend flight training schools.
-	-			Saudi ambassador's wife gives funds that are possibly passed to 9/11 hijackers.
-	-	2001	United States	Remaining hijackers go to the United States, Zacarias Moussaoui goes to the United States and is arrested, other cell members flee Germany.

== September 11, 2001 ==
All times are in local time (EDT or UTC−4).

Time (a.m) H:M:	Location	Notes
7:59	Logan International Airport, Boston, Massachusetts	American Airlines Flight 11 takes off from Boston Logan, bound for Los Angeles International Airport near Los Angeles.
8:14	Logan International Airport, Boston, Massachusetts	United Airlines Flight 175 takes off from Boston Logan, also bound for Los Angeles.
8:14–8:18	United States airspace over Franklin County, Massachusetts	Flight 11 is hijacked.
8:20	Washington Dulles International Airport, Dulles, Virginia	American Airlines Flight 77 takes off from Dulles International Airport, also bound for Los Angeles.
8:42	Newark International Airport, Newark and Elizabeth, New Jersey	United Airlines Flight 93 takes off from Newark International Airport, bound for San Francisco International Airport.
8:42–8:46	United States airspace over Bergen County and Passaic County, New Jersey	Flight 175 is hijacked.
8:46:40	North Tower, World Trade Center, New York City, New York	Flight 11 crashes into the North Tower of the World Trade Center between the 93rd and 99th floors.
8:51–8:54	United States airspace over Gallia County and Lawrence County, Ohio	Flight 77 is hijacked.
9:03:11	South Tower, World Trade Center, New York City, New York	Flight 175 crashes into the South Tower of the World Trade Center between the 77th and 85th floors.
9:28	United States airspace over Cuyahoga County and Lorain County, Ohio	Flight 93 is hijacked.
9:37:46	The Pentagon, Arlington, Virginia	Flight 77 crashes into the western side of The Pentagon.
9:58:59	South Tower, World Trade Center, New York City, New York	The South Tower collapses.
10:03:11	Somerset County, Pennsylvania	Flight 93 crashes into a field in a tiny borough of Shanksville, Pennsylvania.
10:28:25	North Tower, World Trade Center, New York City, New York	The North Tower collapses.

== Rest of September ==
- September 13: On the personal orders of Queen Elizabeth II, "The Star-Spangled Banner" is played during the Changing of the Guard at Buckingham Palace in London, marking the first time a foreign national anthem is played outside Buckingham Palace on an occasion other than a state visit. Russia observes a minute's silence.
- September 14 to September 21: Worldwide stock markets plummet.
- September 15: CIA director George Tenet presents the Worldwide Attack Matrix.
- September 20: George W. Bush announces that the US is at war.

== October ==
- October 1: Rudy Giuliani speaks to the United Nations General Assembly.
- October 7: U.S. attack on Afghanistan commences.

== Beyond October ==
- March 2002: The Tribute in Light project begins.
- September 11, 2002: First anniversary of the September 11, 2001 attacks commemorations are held throughout the world, particularly the U.S.
- September 11, 2008: Pentagon Memorial opens and is dedicated for the victims of The Pentagon and American Airlines Flight 77.
- September 10, 2011: Flight 93 National Memorial is inaugurated and opens to the public dedicated for the victims of United Airlines Flight 93.
- September 11, 2011: National September 11 Memorial opens for victims' families, dedicated for all of the 2,977 victims including The Pentagon, Flight 77, and Flight 93, plus the six victims of the 1993 bombing. It would open in public the next day.
- May 15, 2014: National September 11 Museum is inaugurated for a private ceremony for the victims' families. It would open in public six days later.
