= Ziad Jarrah =

Lebanese terrorist and 9/11 hijacker (1975–2001)

- زياد جراح
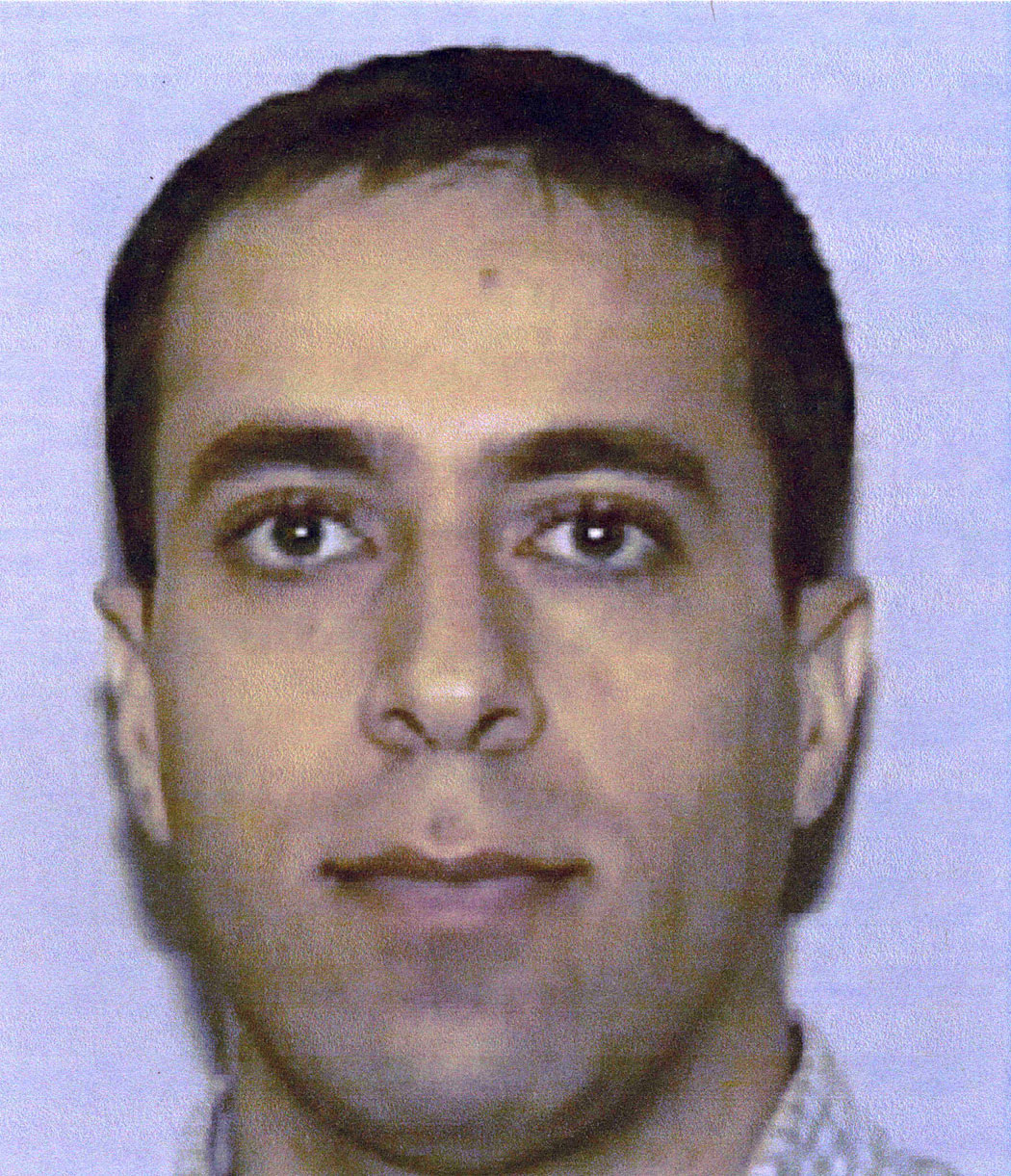
- Jarrah in July 2001
- Born: Ziad Samir Jarrah; May 11, 1975; Beirut, Lebanon
- Died: September 11, 2001 (aged 26); Stonycreek Township, Somerset County, Pennsylvania, U.S.
- Cause of death: Suicide by plane crash during the September 11 attacks
- Other name: Ziad al-Jarrah
- Education: University of Greifswald; Hamburg University of Applied Sciences
- Organization(s): Al-Qaeda; Hamburg cell (1990s–2001)
- Known for: Hijacking United Airlines Flight 93 during the September 11 attacks
- Relatives: Jamal Jarrah (uncle); Assem Jarrah (cousin)
- Accomplices: Ahmed al-Haznawi, Ahmed al-Nami, and Saeed al-Ghamdi

Details
- Date: September 11, 2001; 10:03 a.m. (EDT)
- Country: United States
- State: Pennsylvania
- Target: Likely the U.S. Capitol or the White House
- Killed: 40
- Weapon: Hijacked Boeing 757-222
- Ziad Jarrah's voice Jarrah's second announcement on air traffic radio Recorded September 11, 2001

Ziad Samir Jarrah (Note: Arabic: زياد سمير جراح, romanized: Ziyād Samīr Jarrāḥ; also known as Ziad al-Jarrah) (May 11, 1975 – September 11, 2001) was a Lebanese engineering student and terrorist hijacker for al-Qaeda. He was one of four hijackers who hijacked United Airlines Flight 93 as part of the September 11 attacks. The flight, which was traveling from Newark, New Jersey, to San Francisco, crashed near Shanksville, Pennsylvania, after passengers and crew attempted to regain control of the aircraft, preventing the hijackers from reaching their intended target.

Jarrah was born in a secular and wealthy family living in Beirut during the Lebanese Civil War. In 1996, he moved to Germany to study aerospace engineering at the Hamburg University of Applied Sciences. In Hamburg, he became part of a clandestine cell system known as the Hamburg cell with fellow hijackers Mohamed Atta and Marwan al-Shehhi, among many others. In 1999, member Ramzi bin al-Shibh took the cell to Afghanistan to meet al-Qaeda's leader, Osama bin Laden, where they were instructed to receive flight training. In 2000, Jarrah enrolled in a flight school in Florida.

In September 2001, Jarrah, Ahmed al-Haznawi, Ahmed al-Nami, and Saeed al-Ghamdi boarded Flight 93 at Newark International Airport. Mid-flight, they took control of the cockpit, injuring or killing the pilots, and Jarrah began flying it towards Washington, D.C. His group likely planned to crash the flight into either the U.S. Capitol or the White House. (Note: Various sources have speculated that the White House was the target of Flight 93; the 9/11 Commission Report, based on information derived from the interrogations of Khalid Sheikh Mohammed, confidently asserts that it was, in fact, the Capitol Building that was targeted. Additionally, before he was captured, Sheikh Mohammed, along with bin al-Shibh, told an Al Jazeera reporter (who was taken blindfolded to his hideout) back in 2002 that the fourth target was in fact the Capitol Building.) Their plan failed when the passengers then tried storming the cockpit to take back the plane, which caused it to crash in a field near Shanksville, Pennsylvania, killing everyone on board who was still alive.

== Early life ==
Ziad Samir Jarrah was born on May 11, 1975, in the Mazraa neighborhood of Beirut, Lebanon. He was raised by a wealthy and respected Arab family at an apartment in Beirut's working class neighborhood of Tanak, and a house with a 25-acre farm in the rural town of Marj. He went to school in the city. Jarrah's father Samir worked for the Lebanese government as a social service inspector, while his mother Nafissa was a principal at an elementary school. His uncle Jamal later became a banker, a campaigner for Lebanese prime minister Rafik Hariri and a member of the Parliament of Lebanon. In his youth, Jarrah played football and trained in martial arts. He also expressed a strong interest in pursuing aviation, the latter of which his family opposed. His father later recalled: "I stopped him from being a pilot. I only have one son and I was afraid that he would crash."

Jarrah grew up amidst fighting in Beirut during the Lebanese Civil War (1975–1990), which saw religiously motivated conflict between Muslim, Christian, and Druze populations. Syria, Israel, the United States, France, and Italy also sent troops to the country. The St. Petersburg Times' Sydney Freedberg wrote that Lebanon went from a peaceful country to "a bloody orgy of assassinations, car bombings, kidnappings and massacres". Tanak was near the front lines of Muslim and Christian factions, and its residents learned to avoid sniper fire. When it was safe, Jarrah's family would take him out to Marj, to "release pent-up tensions" caused by the warfare. During the war, Marj's surrounding Beqaa Valley developed a reputation among analysts as a "haven for [Muslim] terrorists", while Jarrah was neither passionate about Islam nor politically extremist then. Although his parents were self-described Sunnis, they did not significantly observe Islamic customs, and his mother worked at a Christian school.

In 1995 and 1996, while Jarrah is officially known to have lived in Lebanon, a person bearing his name rented an apartment in Brooklyn in New York City. Following the 2001 death of Lebanon's Jarrah, the apartment's landlords identified the tenant Jarrah as matching photographs of the former released by the FBI.

== Education ==
Sources disagree on Jarrah's level of intelligence and success in schooling across his life. According to one of his teachers in Beirut, he had below-average grades. However, his cousin Assem said of his college studies in Greifswald, Germany: "No, normal is not the right word. Ziad was brilliant. He finished his language course in two semesters when it usually takes four. Ziad was ambitious and wanted to establish himself." The 9/11 Commission Report (2004) and Jarrah's fiancée Aysel Şengün claimed that by the end of his life, he learned to speak at least four languages at a high level: Arabic, French, German, and English. However, he might have been lying to people about the extent of his English skills.

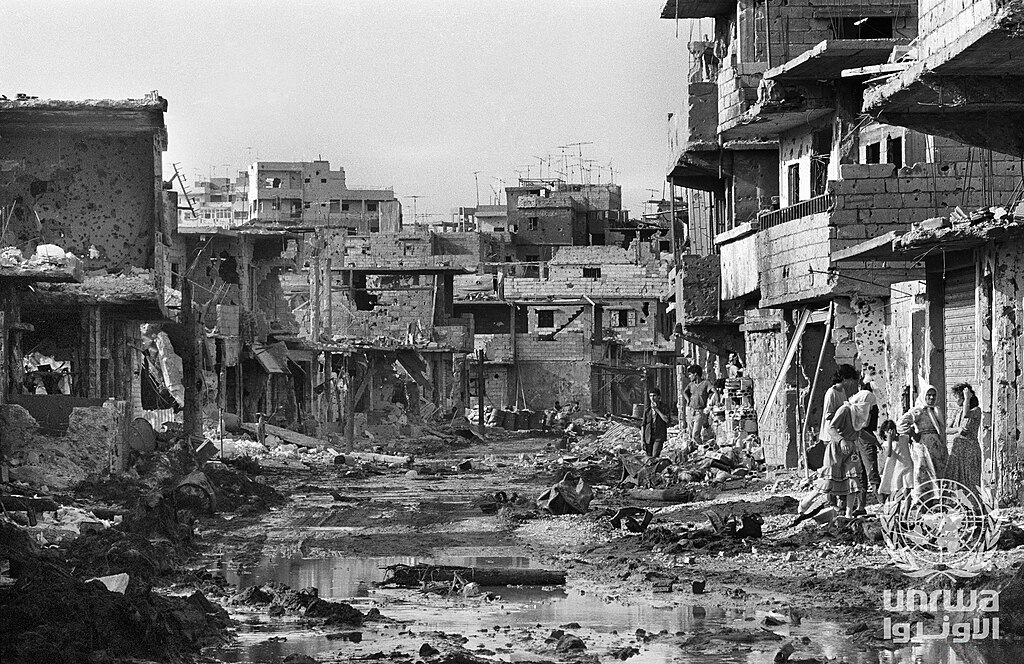
The aftermath of fighting at the Shatila refugee camp in eastern Beirut in 1986, when Jarrah visited the nearby area to go to school

Most children in Tanak went to an affordable Islamic school in the neighborhood named al-Farouk. However, starting in 1981, Jarrah attended an expensive Christian school, al-Hikmeh, in an upper middle class neighborhood of east Beirut named Achrafieh. In 1986 and 1987, his commute to al-Hikmeh saw sniper activity, as it was nearby the neighborhood of Sabra and the Shatila refugee camp, which became targets in the war due to their Palestinian refugee populations. His childhood friend, Ziad Touba, later recalled:

"[When] Ziad and I were out late, I would have to sleep at his house to avoid the snipers [in Tanak]. On those occasions, we would spend our time talking about his flings with girls from the other side [of Beirut, the east], a place unknown to me. [...] He also used to show me his martial arts skills. More than once I went to watch him learn street fighting at his school. He was both aggressive and gentle."

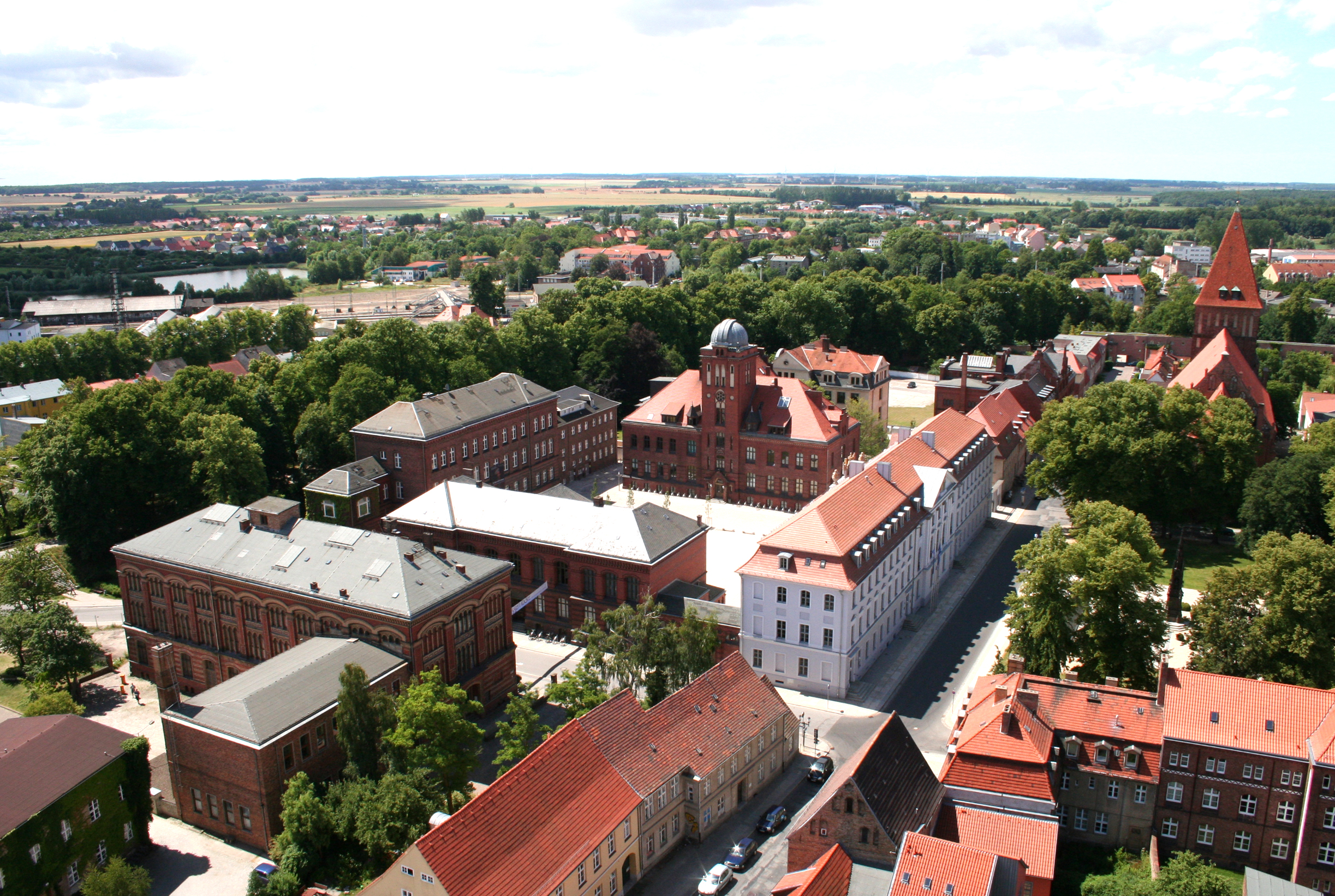
The University of Greifswald in 2006

Jarrah later enrolled at Mar Elias Batina, another costly school, in the western neighborhood of Wata al-Msaytbeh. In the 1990s, his parents forced him out of their home, while giving him a choice of studying in Germany or Canada. He felt Canada was too far away, and he predicted his parents would ask him to marry a cousin of his that lived there. In April 1996, after obtaining a student visa, Jarrah moved into an apartment in Germany so he could enroll in a German-language certificate program at the nearby University of Greifswald. A course in the language was a prerequisite for non-native speakers pursuing higher education in the country.

He lived in Greifswald with his cousins Assem and Salim Ghazi Jarrah. Assem, who was staying in Germany while his wife worked on a gynecology degree, was put in charge of the other two. He said of Ziad that, aside from doing well in school, "he was also a playboy, who loved women, discos, and bars. He often remarked how stuck in the 1950s Greifswald was." Jarrah then formed a close friendship with Aysel Şengün, a German citizen of Turkish descent studying dentistry. They had a romantic relationship for the rest of his life, and briefly lived together. Jarrah then planned to study dentistry as well.

== Radicalization ==
Şengün later recalled that after Jarrah returned to Greifswald from a trip to Beirut in winter 1996, "he seemed changed". He was more somber, and started reading al-Jihad, a radical Islamist publication. He also started visiting Greifswald's mosque, becoming friends with the proprietor, Abdul Rahman al-Makhadi. He was a Yemeni man who enforced behavior compliant with Islamic morality among the visitors, and became a local "spokesman for radical Islam". He was also being surveilled by German intelligence for giving money to Hamas. He and Jarrah traveled across Germany, and he introduced Jarrah to his Muslim friends. One of them, a man known as Marcel "Hussein" K., was the vice president of the Münster Islamic Centre in North Rhine-Westphalia, and he became Jarrah's confidant for the rest of Jarrah's life. In 2000 and 2001, he would often call Marcel for advice right before he made important decisions.

In September 1997, Jarrah moved to Hamburg to pursue a degree in aerospace engineering at the Hamburg University of Applied Sciences. This was a sudden change from his plan to enter dentistry; he explained to Şengün that he was interested in aviation since he was a kid, and to Assem that no medical school would accept him. Concurrently, he worked at a Volkswagen paint shop in nearby Wolfsburg. Jarrah started visiting the al-Quds Mosque, which preached Salafi Islam. There, he met a group of friends who also enforced Islamic morality among the visitors. Jarrah himself started enforcing it with Şengün, criticizing her friends and clothes. He made her wear a veil, demanded she cover her hands, and did not let her meet any of his friends. Their arguments caused them to separate, but they later got back together. In early 1999, Jarrah told her there was no greater honor in life than dying for Allah, and that he was going to wage jihad, which scared her. Meanwhile, he stopped writing home. Jarrah's extremist behavior concerned his family, who sent "emissaries" to his location to plead with him to return to Beirut. His father also threatened to cut off his monthly allowance of $2000.

== Hamburg cell ==
By meeting people at the mosque, Jarrah joined the Hamburg cell, a clandestine cell system of Islamist terrorists whose members eventually committed or planned al-Qaeda's September 11 attacks against the United States. Nineteen hijackers, including Jarrah, hijacked four American commercial flights as part of the September 11 attacks. American Airlines Flight 11 and United Airlines Flight 175 were flown into the North and South Towers of the World Trade Center in New York City, while American Airlines Flight 77 was flown into the Pentagon near Washington, D.C. Jarrah was the hijacker-pilot of United Airlines Flight 93, which crashed in a field near Shanksville, Pennsylvania, after passengers and crew attempted to regain control of the aircraft, preventing the hijackers from reaching their intended target. 2,977 people were killed as a result of the attacks. The plan for the attack was formulated by Osama bin Laden and Khalid Sheikh Mohammed.

The cell's leader was Mohamed Atta, who moved to Hamburg for education, just like Jarrah and members Marwan al-Shehhi and Zakariya Essabar. Atta was the eventual hijacker-pilot of Flight 11, and al-Shehhi, the hijacker-pilot of Flight 175. The other members were Ramzi bin al-Shibh, Abdelghani Mzoudi, Ahmed Taleb, Mamoun Darkazanli, Mohammed Haydar Zammar, Mounir el-Motassadeq, Naamen Meziche, and Said Bahaji. Jarrah's closest friend in the group was bin al-Shibh. Bahaji and Zammar have both been described as the one who brought them all together.

In late 1999, the cell decided to travel to Chechnya, to help jihadist rebels fight Russia's forces in the Second Chechen War. Right before they went, however, Khalid al-Masri and Mohamedou Ould Slahi persuaded them to instead travel to Afghanistan. Jarrah called Marcel K. before going. Jarrah, Atta, al-Shehhi, and bin al-Shibh then entered Afghanistan separately to meet with al-Qaeda's leaders, including bin Laden. They were taught how to be jihadist terrorists, and were briefed on the plan to hijack American airliners. Some of the members eventually met up there. A video with the timestamp of January 8, 2000, shows Jarrah, Atta, bin al-Shibh, and others watching bin Laden speak at al-Qaeda's Tarnak Farms base. Another video, timestamped January 18, shows Jarrah and Atta stating their last wills and testaments, and discussing unspecified sheets of paper on the floor next to them; the discussion is inaudible. Şengün did not completely know about Jarrah's trip, but told his family that she feared he had gone to Afghanistan.

== Planning of the September 11 attacks ==
=== Return to Hamburg ===
The Hamburg cell members who visited Afghanistan eventually returned to Hamburg to start working on the hijacking plan. After Jarrah returned, he explained to Şengün and his family that he had simply been moving his belongings from Greifswald to Hamburg. The cell worked out the plan's details in Atta's apartment while Bahaji, bin al-Shibh, and Essabar lived there at different points. It is debatable if Jarrah lived there as well.

El-Motassadeq paid the tuition and other bills of the students in the cell, like Jarrah. After the cell members moved to the U.S., he kept paying the rent on their homes in Germany to make it look like they planned to come back. The cell attempted to hide their extremism and blend in with the population; according to Şengün, Jarrah shaved his beard, and began to act in a more secular manner. To hide his time in Afghanistan from security officials at international airports, in February 2000, he reported his passport as stolen and received a blank duplicate—just as Atta and al-Shehhi had done the previous month. All the members stopped contacting their families, except Jarrah, who may have had doubts about participating in the attack.

=== 2000 and early 2001 in the U.S. ===
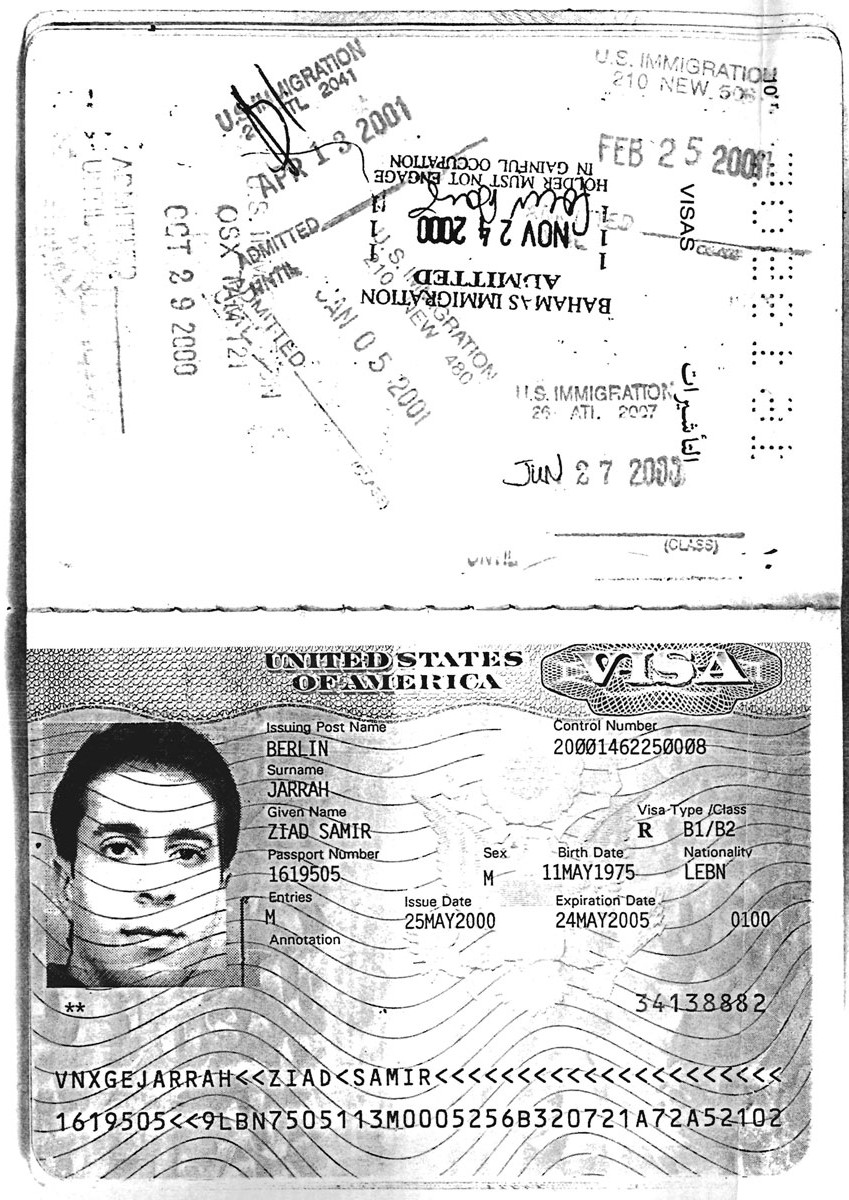
Photocopy of Jarrah's U.S. visa (copy was made in June 2001)

In the years before the 11 September attacks, Jarrah likely entered the U.S. on seven occasions, more than any other hijacker. On 25 May 2000, in Berlin, he applied for and received a five-year B-1/B-2 visa to enter the country. On 27 June, Jarrah arrived there for the first time, landing at Newark International Airport in Newark, New Jersey, after departing from Munich.

Jarrah, al-Shehhi, and Atta then went to Florida, where they enrolled full-time at Huffman Aviation in Venice. Jarrah did not subsequently exchange his tourist visa for a student visa, thus violating his immigration status. He attended the school until 15 January 2001. After the attacks, many of his classmates remembered him fondly, describing him as kind and trustworthy. He obtained his license to fly small aircraft in August 2000, and began training to fly large jets later that year. In Venice, he lived with a fellow student pilot named Thorsten Biermann, who did not have any confirmed connection to al-Qaeda, but was put on the FBI's watchlist after the attacks, as he arrived in the U.S. from Hamburg around the same time as the hijackers. Jarrah called Marcel K. at the start of and during his training.

=== Germany and Lebanon trips ===
Jarrah then visited Beirut to see his family, and to Germany to visit Şengün. He brought her back to the U.S. for a ten-day visit, and she even attended a flight training session with him. In late January 2001, he flew back to Beirut to visit his father, who was ill, and then to Germany to see his girlfriend again. These trips displayed a notable difference between Jarrah and the other hijackers—the latter having broken off all their familial and romantic relationships during the planning of the attacks. Ziad Touba said that on one of Jarrah's Lebanon visits, Jarrah told him that he was moving to the U.S., and that he gained a new passion for aviation. Touba later recalled: "What struck me most was the change in his demeanor. He was calmer. He seemed happy and content, not aggressive and stubborn as he had been."

In late February 2001, Jarrah came back to the U.S. According to officials from the United Arab Emirates, on 30 January, as Jarrah passed through the Emirates on his way back, he was interviewed by local authorities—at the request of the CIA—regarding his travel history. In the interview, he allegedly admitted to having been to Afghanistan and Pakistan. The CIA denies that he said this, and the 9/11 Commission Report does not mention the moment.

=== May and June 2001 in the U.S. ===
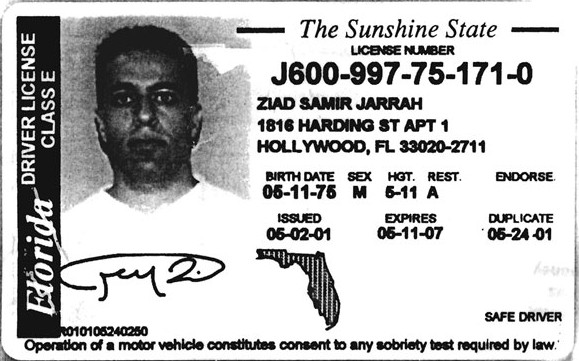
Jarrah's Florida driver's license, which he received in May 2001

Jarrah and Atta got Florida driver's licenses on 2 May 2001. On the 6th, they and Marwan al-Shehhi registered for a two-month membership at the US1 Fitness Center gym in Dania Beach. Before the membership ran out, they renewed it for another two months, and eventually had lessons in close-quarters combat. Jarrah's eventual partner on the United Airlines Flight 93 hijacking, Ahmed al-Haznawi, arrived in Florida on June 8. He moved in with Jarrah, probably later that month. Sometime after, Jarrah rented a new apartment in Lauderdale-by-the-Sea, Florida, and the two men gave the landlord photocopies of their German passports; the landlord turned these over to the FBI after the September attacks.

=== Last Germany trip and brief exit from the plan ===
At some point in the months before the attacks, Jarrah decided to leave al-Qaeda's plan, but then rejoined soon after; he might have done this twice. A staffer on the 9/11 Commission, Dietrich Snell, later said Jarrah was "the last best opportunity the U.S. intelligence community had to avert 11 September", as he was "the most susceptible to turn" out of all the hijackers. Around that time, Atta complained to Ramzi bin al-Shibh about his difficulty in getting through to Jarrah amid tensions between them over the viability of the plan. Atta feared Jarrah might withdraw from the plot completely. On 25 July, Jarrah flew to Germany on a one-way ticket to meet with Şengün again. This was the last time she saw him, but they spoke on the telephone at least once more, in September. He then met with bin al-Shibh, who convinced him to go through with the operation. Jarrah called Marcel K. around this time.

Also around then, Ziad's uncle Nazer Jarrah contacted the Lebanese government and the American embassy in Lebanon, telling them "something very dangerous and serious was afoot with Ziad", and that "Ziad and his friends were up to something"; nobody paid attention.

=== August and September 2001 in the U.S. ===
Jarrah may have arrived back in the U.S. on 5 August 2001, though some sources indicate he took his pilot's test in the country on 2 August, having missed his sister's wedding to do so. For a few nights around late August and early September, he rented a room at the Pin-Del Motel in Laurel, Maryland; at the same time, Flight 77 hijacker Nawaf al-Hazmi rented a separate room, having booked his independently from Jarrah. They were only a mile away from the Valencia Motel, where four other hijackers stayed.

Jarrah returned to Florida by 7 September. In early September, he called his father Samir, and asked for money for flight training. Samir asked him how his English skills were developing, to which Ziad replied that there were so many Arabs at the flight school that he was able to exclusively speak in Arabic. His father gave him $2000 USD, which investigators believe did not pay for the training, but rather for plane tickets for Flight 93—for Ziad, al-Haznawi, and the other two hijackers of the flight, Saeed al-Ghamdi and Ahmed al-Nami. On the 7th, Jarrah and the three other Flight 93 hijackers flew from Fort Lauderdale, Florida, to Newark International Airport. Just before the attacks, Jarrah possibly set up a large mock cockpit made of cardboard boxes in his apartment.

On 9 September, Jarrah called his family, including Jamal. The latter recalled after the attacks that Ziad said he would go to his cousin's wedding on the 22nd, and buy a suit for the occasion. However, Nazer Jarrah recalled that Ziad phoned him on the 9th, and was non-committal about going to the wedding. Nazer said when they last talked on the phone (not specifying the date), Ziad asked him for more money; Nazer obliged, then felt disturbed at funding whatever his nephew was planning. On the 10th, Jarrah spent the evening writing a letter to Şengün, who recently became his fiancée. Investigators consider the letter to be a suicide note. It did not reach her apartment in Germany until after she moved out of it. Jarrah cryptically wrote that "I did what I had to", and that "it is a great honour and you will see the result, and everyone will be celebrating."

== September 11 attacks ==
=== Early morning ===
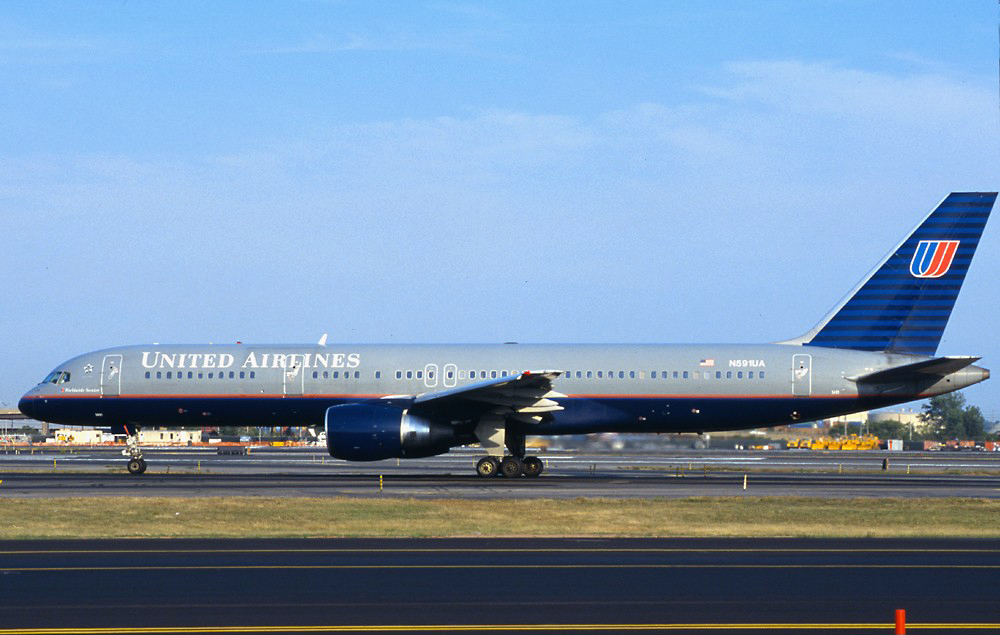
N591UA, the plane that crashed as United Airlines Flight 93

On the morning of September 11, 2001, Jarrah, Saeed al-Ghamdi, Ahmed al-Haznawi, and Ahmed al-Nami were in New Jersey to board United Airlines Flight 93, scheduled to depart Newark International Airport for San Francisco International Airport. They likely planned to crash the plane into either the U.S. Capitol Building or the White House in Washington, D.C. At 5:01 a.m. ET, Jarrah phoned Marwan al-Shehhi, who was in Boston to board United Airlines Flight 175. They spoke for less than a minute, likely to confirm that the plan for the attacks was ready to proceed. He made a similar call to Atta, planning to board American Airlines Flight 11—but not to the other hijacker-pilot, American Airlines Flight 77's Hani Hanjour, who was in Virginia. Jarrah also called Şengün, and told her he loved her three times. She asked what was up with him, and he hung up soon after.

=== United Airlines Flight 93 hijacking ===
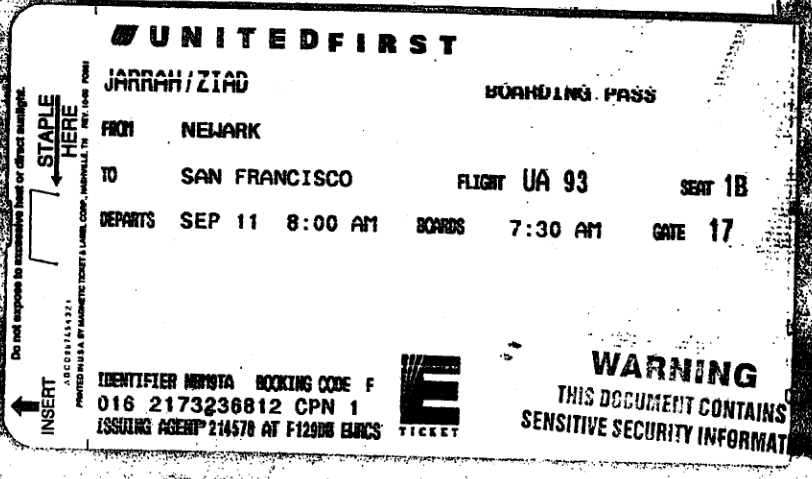
Ziad Jarrah's boarding pass for Flight 93

Jarrah's group boarded without incident. The plane had 44 occupants: 37 passengers (including the hijackers) and seven crew members. The hijackers sat in their first class seats, and the plane took off at 8:42 a.m. Flights 11 and 175 crashed into 1 and 2 World Trade Center at 8:46 and 9:03, respectively. Air traffic control notified Flight 93's pilots of the incidents, and told them to be on alert for hijackers. The message was forwarded to the other crew members. Around 9:28, 46 minutes after take off, Jarrah's group hijacked the plane, and he took over its controls. They tied red scarves around their heads. The United pilots were likely injured, and at least one was possibly still alive by 9:45. Cellphone calls made by passengers indicate that at some point, either al-Haznawi or al-Nami tied a box around their own torso and told the cabin there was a bomb inside of it; they were probably lying to seem threatening.

Flight 93 (Jarrah) at 9:31 a.m.:
Ladies and gentlemen: here the captain. Please sit down, keep remaining seating. We have a bomb on board. So sit. [sic]

Cleveland ARTCC at 9:32:
Er, uh… calling Cleveland Center… You're unreadable. Say again slowly.

Flight 93 (Jarrah or the other hijackers) at 9:32 to 33:
Don't move. Shut up. Come on, come. Shut up. Don't move. Stop. Sit, sit, sit down. Sit down. [Unintelligible]
[Arabic] ...the brother.
[English] Stop. No more. Sit down.
[Arabic] That's it, that's it, that's it...
[English] ...down, down. Shut up. [Unintelligible]

Cleveland ARTCC at 9:33:
We just, we didn't get it clear… is that United 93 calling?

— Full Flight 93 and ATC radio transcript

At 9:31, Jarrah spoke in English into a voice recorder in the cockpit, attempting to message the cabin: "Ladies and gentlemen: here the captain. [sic] Please sit down, keep remaining seating. [sic] We have a bomb on board. So sit." However, the recorder was for the plane's airband radio frequency, meaning his audio instead went to the air traffic controllers at Cleveland ARTCC. He or the other hijackers continued sounding on the frequency. At 9:34, a warning bell was heard, indicating Jarrah was trying to disconnect the plane's autopilot to change the plane's destination. He instead reset the autopilot so he could tell it to turn Flight 93 east to Washington, D.C.

At 9:42 a.m., in response to the hijackings of Flights 11, 77, and 175, the Federal Aviation Administration ordered a ground stop on almost all planes nationwide, and for flights in progress to land at the closest available airport. Those in the air were monitored for suspicious activity. At the start of the hijacking, Jarrah had turned off the plane's transponder, thinking it would stop air traffic control from monitoring his turn towards Washington D.C. However, he left on other devices that broadcast the plane's flight path and altitude, so Cleveland noticed Flight 93's turn, and started tracking it. A woman, possibly flight attendant Debbie Welsh, was then heard struggling with the hijackers for less than a minute, and was killed or otherwise silenced.

Flight 93's radio at 9:31:57 a.m.
Jarrah's first attempt to speak to the cabin

Flight 93's radio at 9:39:11 a.m.
His second attempt

Meanwhile, at 9:37, Flight 77 crashed into the Pentagon near Washington, D.C. Two minutes later, Jarrah attempted to speak to the cabin again: "This is the captain. Would like you all to remain seated. There is a bomb on board, and we are going back to the airport, and to have our demands, so please remain quiet. [sic]" Flight 93 then descended 20,000 feet (from a peak of 40,700 feet) until stabilizing at 9:46. Apparently worried it was losing altitude too quickly, Jarrah jerked the plane's nose upward, then began another gradual descent. At 9:45, another hijacker asked him whether to open the cockpit door to the other two hijackers; Jarrah replied: "Inform them, and tell him to talk to the pilot; bring the pilot back".

=== Passenger revolt and crash ===
Through phone calls made from 9:35 to 9:55 a.m., Flight 93's passengers and surviving crew learned of the other planes' fates. To avoid a similar crash landing, a group of them started discussing a plan to revolt and take back the plane. They voted to go through with it. The hijackers began preparing for the revolt, either overhearing the plan or sensing it. At 9:57, some passengers started trying to break into the cockpit, but had trouble getting through the door; for the next six minutes, they fought some of the hijackers, excluding at least Jarrah, who stayed inside. He started rolling the plane left and right to knock the passengers and crew off balance, causing the plane to leave its Washington, D.C. course. The revolt nonetheless continued. Jarrah then learned how many people were involved in it, exclaiming, "there are some guys; all those guys"; he instead decided to pitch the plane's nose up and down.

Flight 93's path from New Jersey to Pennsylvania

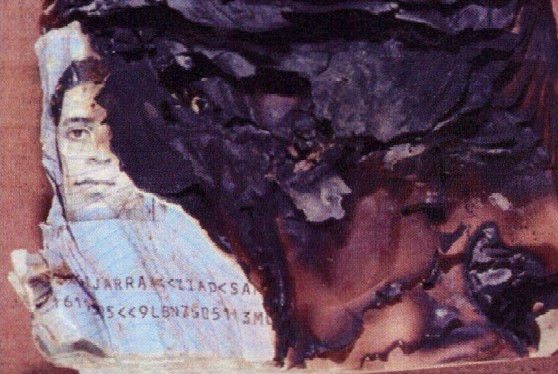
Jarrah's charred passport and visa found among the wreckage of Flight 93

Around 10 a.m., Flight 93 was seen erratically flying low to the ground over southwest Pennsylvania. Inside, the passengers and crew started using a food cart as a battering ram against the door. Jarrah instructed al-Ghamdi, who was inside the cockpit by then, to continue the pitching for him. A minute later, the pitching stopped, and Jarrah yelled at him to cut off the oxygen in the cabin. Jarrah then repeated "give it to me!" in Arabic, possibly referring to the plane's yoke. Moments later, at 10:03, the plane crashed at 563 miles per hour (906 km/h) into a field in Stonycreek Township in Somerset County, Pennsylvania. All the people on board who were still alive died instantly. It is likely that the hijackers intentionally crashed the plane into the ground as a response to the revolt.

== Aftermath ==
Shortly after 11 September, Şengün filed a missing persons report for Jarrah in Bochum, Germany. Over in the U.S., he became a suspect in Flight 93's hijacking when FBI agents found a "Ziad Jarrahi" [sic] on the flight manifest. His passport was also at the crash site. Most of it was charred. On 6 October, The Dallas Morning News reporter Tod Robberson visited the home of Jarrah's family in Mazraa, and recalled the scene in 2011:

"Cigarettes, prescription drugs and lots of bottles of whiskey were everywhere. Ziad's father, Samir, was visibly wrought and still trying to make sense of everything. It was obvious that a lot of hard drinking had been going on during the previous days as Ziad's name leaked as one of the 9/11 hijacking suspects."

Şengün entered witness protection, leaving her apartment unattended when Jarrah's 9 September letter finally arrived. The German postal service returned it to the U.S., where it was discovered and delivered to the FBI.

The remains of Jarrah were later identified and turned over to the Federal Bureau of Investigation (FBI) as evidence after DNA samples submitted by Şengün were matched to remains recovered in the crash site.

=== Innocence claims ===
Starting in late September 2001, Jarrah's family members either claimed he was an innocent passenger on Flight 93, rather than a hijacker—or was not present on the plane at all, and that the hijackers stole his identity. They said he did not display the same "smoldering political resentments" or cultural conservatism as the other perpetrators. His mother said, "we know the person we have raised, and I know he is not capable of such horror", and Jamal Jarrah said "it makes no sense", noting Ziad's promise on 9 September to go to his cousin's wedding. Şengün claimed her conversation with Ziad on the 11th was "pleasant" and "normal", and that he never mentioned any names of the other hijackers during it.

In October 2001, authorities contradicted each others' findings on Jarrah: U.S. attorney general John Ashcroft stated that Jarrah lived in Mohamed Atta's apartment while the Hamburg cell was active, while German investigators found he did not. The 9/11 Commission Report, published in 2004, concluded with certainty that Jarrah was a hijacker. Further doubt was cast on his family's claims in 2006, when U.S. authorities released the videos of him and Atta in Afghanistan in January 2000.

== In popular culture ==
Jarrah has been portrayed in multiple films about the 11 September attacks: by Karim Saleh in The Hamburg Cell (2004), Pej Vahdat in The Flight That Fought Back (2005), Dominic Rains in Flight 93 (2006), and Khalid Abdalla in United 93 (2006). The 2021 film Copilot is based on Jarrah's relationship with Şengün prior to the attack. He is portrayed by Roger Azar. The 2016 album Media in the Service of Terror by Vatican Shadow opens with the track "Ziad Jarrah Studied Mathematics".

== Bibliography ==
- Baer, Robert (2002). See No Evil: The True Story of a Ground Soldier in the CIA's War on Terrorism. New York: Three Rivers Press.
- Ruthven, Malise (2004). A Fury for God: The Islamist Attack on America. Granta. ISBN 9781862075733.
- Rodriguez, Bert (2013). Face Fear, Create Courage. Indianapolis, Ind.: Dog Ear Publishing.
- Collins, Susan M. (8 September 2004). "Building an Agile Intelligence Community to Fight Terrorism and Emerging Threats". Senate Committee on Governmental Affairs. Archived from the original on 13 August 2009.
- FBI National Press Office (27 September 2001). "The FBI releases 19 photographs of individuals believed to be the hijackers of the four airliners that crashed on September 11, 01". Federal Bureau of Investigation (Press release). Washington, D.C. Archived from the original on 1 October 2001.
- "Government's submission regarding relevance of cockpit voice recorders" (PDF). United States district court for the eastern district of Virginia. 13 September 2002. Archived from the original (PDF) on 31 May 2004.
- Kakutani, Michiko (20 May 2005). "Ordinary but for the Evil They Wrought". The New York Times.
- McDermott, Terry (2005). Perfect Soldiers: The Hijackers: Who They Were, Why They Did It. HarperCollins. ISBN 978-0-06-058469-6.
