= Hamburg cell =

Group of radical Islamists in Germany

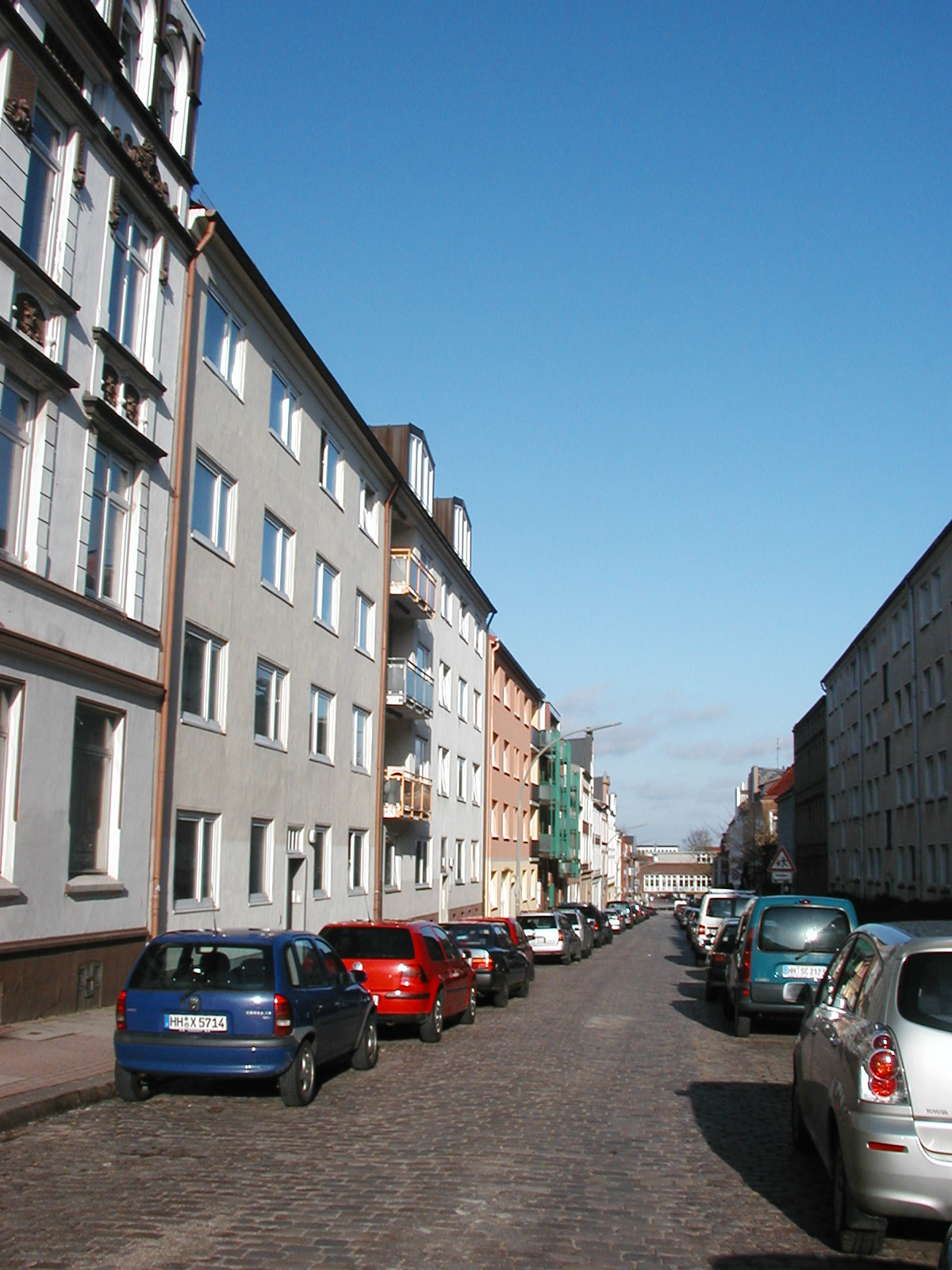
Mohamed Atta's apartment (front left) at No. 54 on Marienstraße in Hamburg, where he lived from 1998 to 2000 (shot from 2010)

The Hamburg cell (German: Hamburger Zelle; Arabic: خلية هامبورغ, Khaliyyat Hāmbūrġ) was a network of radical Islamist university students based in Hamburg, Germany, during the second half of the 1990s. The members had come to Germany to pursue higher education in fields such as engineering, mathematics, and the applied sciences. This cell played a central role in the operational planning of the September 11 attacks carried out by al-Qaeda against the United States. Three of the pilots of the four hijacked planes involved in these coordinated attacks—Mohamed Atta, Marwan al-Shehhi, and Ziad Jarrah—were members of this cell.

In 1999, the cell left Hamburg to join the Chechen jihadists fighting Russia in the Second Chechen War, but redirected to Afghanistan to meet al-Qaeda's leadership. They then worked on the hijacking plan at a Hamburg apartment owned by the cell's ringleader, Mohamed Atta. Twelve men were members: Atta, Marwan al-Shehhi, and Ziad Jarrah—who died as the hijacker-pilots of American Airlines Flight 11, United Airlines Flight 175, and United Airlines Flight 93, respectively—plus Abdelghani Mzoudi, Ahmed Taleb, Mamoun Darkazanli, Mohammed Haydar Zammar, Mounir el-Motassadeq, Naamen Meziche, Ramzi bin al-Shibh, Said Bahaji, and Zakariya Essabar.

As the cell dissolved and 9/11 was carried out, four members disappeared in Afghanistan and Pakistan, while the others were captured or arrested in various countries. Most were imprisoned, while Mzoudi was acquitted, and bin al-Shibh and Darkazanli never faced full trials. The U.S. accused Mohamedou Ould Slahi, a Mauritanian businessman, of helping the cell visit al-Qaeda in Afghanistan. He was arrested, sent to the U.S. detention camp at Guantanamo Bay in Cuba, and tortured by camp officials. After 14 years, he was freed when a court found him to be innocent. Bin al-Shibh, who currently remains at Guantanamo Bay, was also tortured there and in various CIA Black Sites in Europe and Asia.

== Background ==
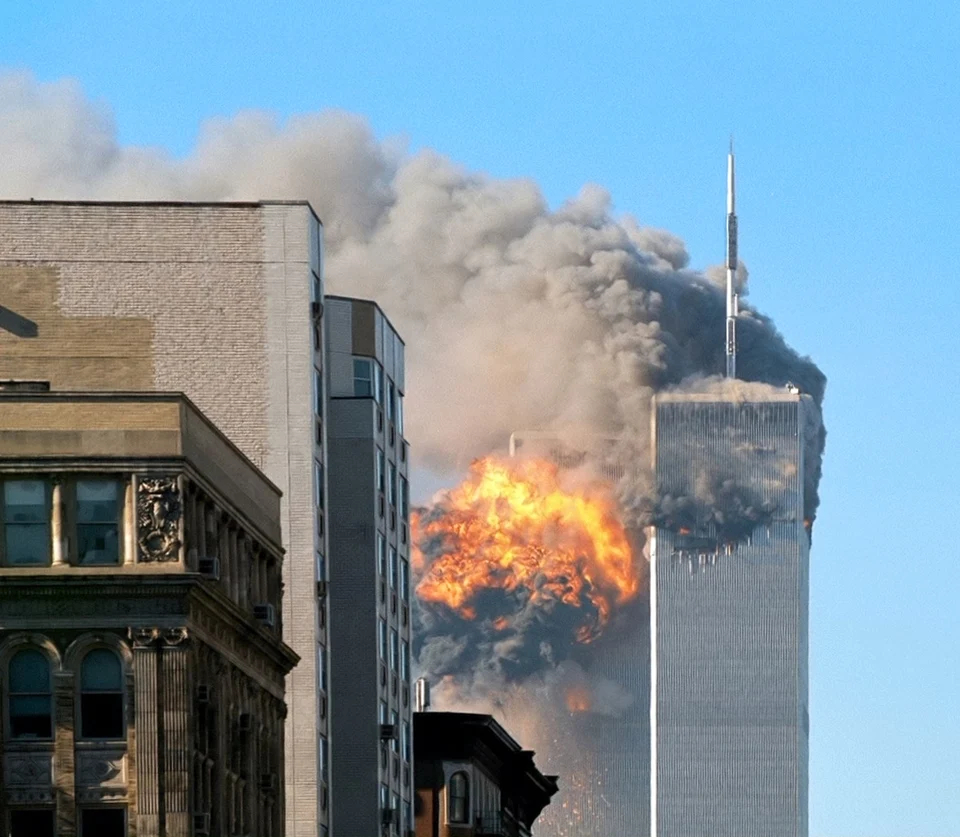
On 9/11, United Airlines Flight 175 crashes into 2 WTC (center), while 1 WTC (right) is damaged from the impact of American Airlines Flight 11

In the 11 September 2001 attacks against the United States, 19 members of the Islamist militant organization al-Qaeda hijacked four American commercial flights in an attempt to crash them into national landmarks. American Airlines Flight 11 and United Airlines Flight 175 were crashed into 1 and 2 World Trade Center (WTC) in New York City. Both towers soon collapsed as a result. American Airlines Flight 77 crashed into the Pentagon near Washington, D.C. United Airlines Flight 93 crashed in a field in Pennsylvania; the hijackers had redirected the plane towards Washington, D.C., but then the other passengers and crew fought the hijackers, causing the crash. Al-Qaeda, founded by Osama bin Laden, organized the attacks.

While bin Laden is considered the main perpetrator of 9/11, Khalid Sheikh Mohammed was the principal designer of the attack plan. Mohammed has detailed the plot to journalists and investigators since 2002. In the early 1990s, Mohammed was involved in the Bojinka plot: al-Qaeda's plan for eleven planes, flying from Asia to the U.S., to be bombed over the Pacific Ocean. Pope John Paul II would concurrently be assassinated. The plot was foiled, but it evolved into the plan for 9/11. In 1996, Mohammed went to bin Laden, who was living in Afghanistan, where the Taliban government allowed al-Qaeda to operate. Mohammed detailed a plan to fly ten planes into American buildings. Bin Laden said it was too elaborate, and it was redesigned around 1999.

== History ==
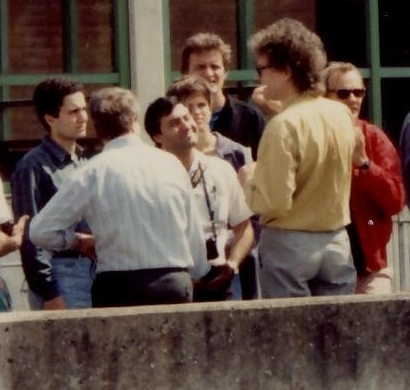
Mohamed Atta (left) talking to fellow students in Germany in 1993

=== Start of the Hamburg cell ===
In 1992, Mohamed Atta, an architect from Egypt, moved to Hamburg, Germany, to study urban planning at university there. Four years later, he began attending the local al-Quds Mosque, which had Muslim visitors from around the world. There, many young men were Islamists, and they enforced Islamic morality in the behavior of the other worshipers. Atta was radicalized towards Islamism, either by meeting those men, or being directly contacted by an agent of bin Laden. He subsequently became the ringleader of the Hamburg cell, a clandestine cell system of Islamic extremist terrorists who lived in the city in 1998 and 1999. Likely, they were planning their own jihadist activities when they met al-Qaeda's leadership, and then joined al-Qaeda in late 1999 to work on the details of the redesigned hijacking plan.

Cell member Ramzi bin al-Shibh was from Yemen. He maintained his Germany residency status by continuously enrolling into college classes that he rarely showed up to. Around 2003, in a statement released by his lawyer, bin al-Shibh listed himself, Atta, Marwan al-Shehhi, and Ziad Jarrah as members. The latter three hijacked separate planes on 9/11—Flights 11, 175, and 93, respectively—and were those who in their respective hijacker groups who flew the planes after the cockpits were taken over. Hani Hanjour, the hijacker-pilot of Flight 77, was not in the cell. Besides those whom bin al-Shibh listed, investigators have determined other men to be members.

Some of the first members Atta reportedly met at the mosque were al-Shehhi, Jarrah, Mounir el-Motassadeq, and Said Bahaji. Al-Shehhi was a devoted Muslim from the United Arab Emirates, and was studying in Hamburg via a scholarship program ran by the Emirati military. Jarrah was from a Lebanese Muslim family, but was mostly secular when he arrived to study in the city. He started observing Islamic rules after visiting the mosque. El-Motassadeq and Bahaji were from Morocco. The latter had served five months in the German Army until he was discharged for medical reasons.

Mamoun Darkazanli, who ran the al-Quds Mosque, was also a member. At some point before 9/11, the U.S. became aware that Darkazanli was associated with al-Qaeda, and asked German authorities to stop him. However, Germany had no laws at the time prohibiting being part of a foreign terrorist organization, so they did not.

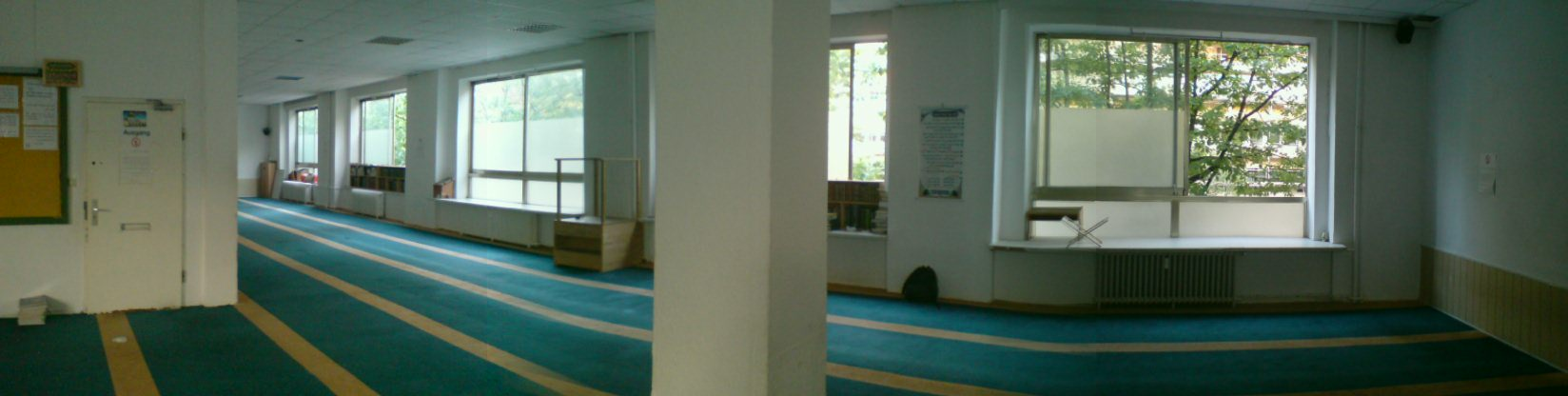
The interior of al-Quds Mosque in 2009

The two other Moroccan members included Zakariya Essabar, who moved to Germany for education, and was radicalized at the mosque. Abdelghani Mzoudi was el-Motassadeq's friend. There were two members from Algeria. Naamen Meziche was born in Algeria, and was a French national when he joined the cell. He was married to the daughter of an Islamic extremist preacher named Mohammed El Fazazi. Little is confirmed about member Ahmed Taleb before he joined, other than his Algerian origin. He was 48 in August 2001—older than the other members. He may have been in contact with Abu Zubaydah, whose membership of Al-Qaeda is disputed.

When Bahaji joined, German authorities were investigating him for associating with an Islamic extremist from Syria named Mohammed Haydar Zammar. The investigation was closed, as they could not find evidence of the pair committing crimes. Bahaji's Islamist and jihadist beliefs came from Zammar. The latter was a local cleric and auto mechanic, who had been a member of the Muslim Brotherhood in Syria, as well as a jihadist fighter in the Bosnian War (1992–1995) and a war in Afghanistan. He was still interested in violent jihad when he joined. Similar to Bahaji, he was being surveilled by the German Federal Criminal Police Office (BKA) and the CIA, which he was unaware of. The BKA and CIA's efforts were not thorough enough to catch the cell planning 9/11. Authorities have described both men as the singular person who brought the cell's members together.

=== Chechnya plan ===
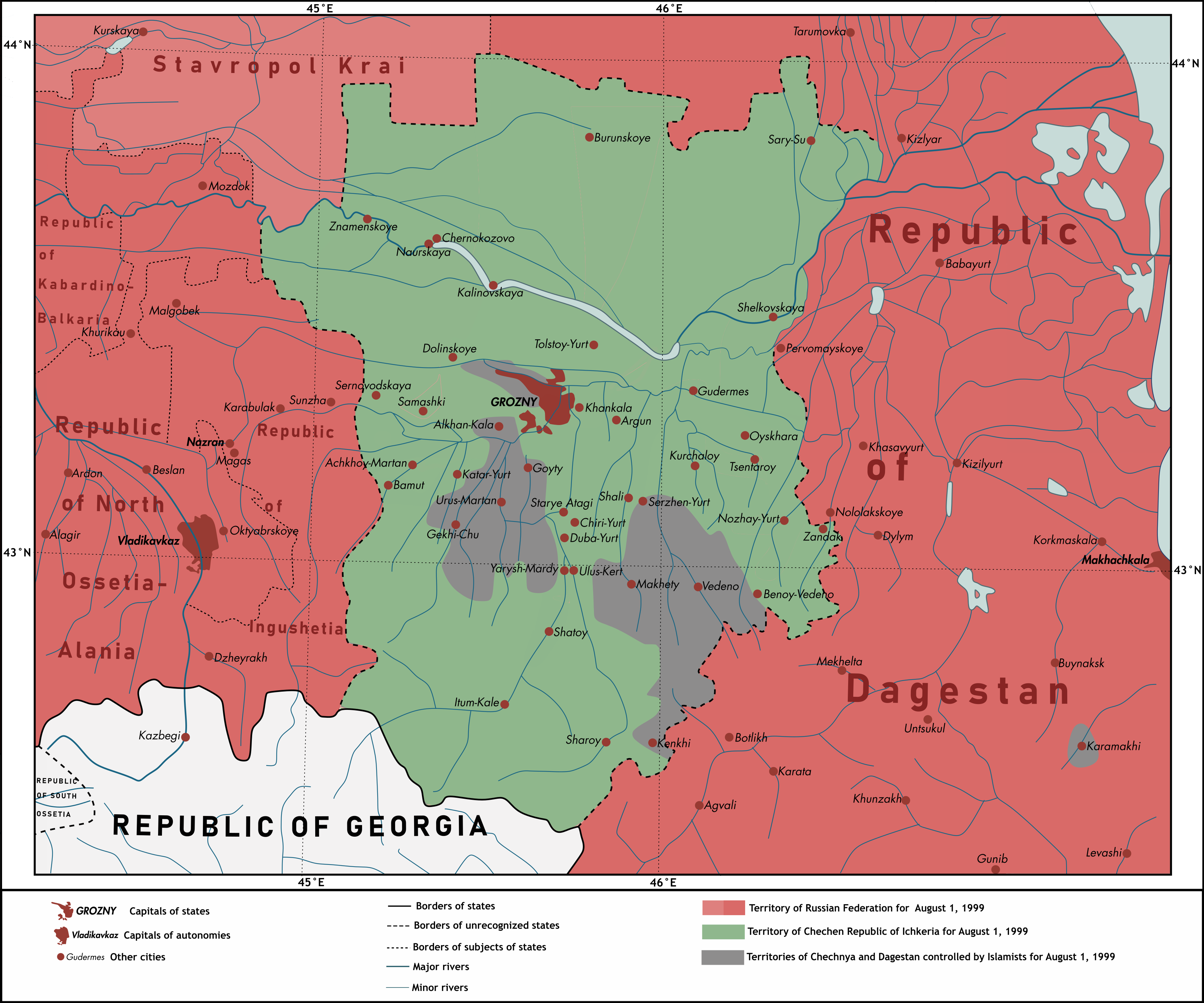
De facto control of Chechnya at the start of the Second Chechen War, showing Russian control (red), the unrecognized Chechen Republic of Ichkeria (green), and the Islamists inside it (grey)

Over a few months in 1999, the cell members watched footage of jihadists fighting in Afghanistan, Bosnia, and Chechnya. The latter region was internationally recognized as a republic of Russia, but was populated by separatist groups. A military of the unrecognized breakaway state named the Chechen Republic of Ichkeria, as well as Islamist Chechen militants, rebelled against Russia during the Second Chechen War (1999–2009). Watching the Islamists fight, the members became motivated to join them in-person. Almost all the members stopped contacting their families. No women were present at Bahaji's wedding at the al-Quds Mosque in October 1999—not even his bride. Atta, al-Shehhi, bin al-Shibh, and Jarrah were in attendance. bin al-Shibh was the event's principal speaker, and he urged the other guests to fight against Jews.

Shortly after 9/11, German authorities found that the cell came up with the plan to hijack U.S. planes independently of al-Qaeda, and that they joined a similar plan of al-Qaeda's partway through. This was refuted in 2004 by the U.S. government's 9/11 Commission, who based their conclusion on interrogations of bin al-Shibh after his capture in 2002. The commission claimed that in late 1999, the cell members boarded a train going east—the direction of Chechnya—and by chance, an al-Qaeda member named Khalid al-Masri was on board the train at the same time. He met the cell, then convinced them to join the organization. Beforehand, the cell had supposedly no connection to al-Qaeda, and no intentions of attacking the U.S. German intelligence official Manfred Murck said the findings helped him understand why Germany's pre-9/11 surveillance of domestic Islamic extremists did not catch the plan; it was not made in Hamburg.

=== Afghanistan visits ===
After meeting al-Masri; Atta, al-Shehhi, bin al-Shibh, and Jarrah entered Afghanistan separately to meet with al-Qaeda's leadership. The four were trained to be jihadist terrorists, and briefed on the plan to hijack American airliners. Some of the members eventually met up in Afghanistan. Raw footage with the timestamp of 8 January shows multiple people watching bin Laden speak at al-Qaeda's Tarnak Farms training base in the country. They include Atta; bin al-Shibh; Jarrah; al-Qaeda officers Abu Faraj al-Libbi and Saif al Adel; and Fahid Mohammed Ally Msalam, the latter of whom was wanted for participating in al-Qaeda's 1998 bombing of U.S. embassies in East Africa. Similar footage timestamped 18 January shows Atta and Jarrah stating their last wills and testaments, and discussing unspecified sheets of paper on the floor next to them. The former recording was likely to be used in an official al-Qaeda propaganda video. Both recordings were released in 2006; subsequent attempts by authorities to lip read Atta and Jarrah's discussion of the papers were futile. The cell members who visited Afghanistan eventually returned to Hamburg.

=== Planning of the September 11 attacks ===
At different times between 1998 and 2000, Bahaji, bin al-Shibh, and Essabar lived with Atta in his apartment on Marienstraße (Marien Street) in Hamburg. There, the cell worked out the details of al-Qaeda's hijacking plan. Investigators disagree if Jarrah ever lived there. Notably, Jarrah was the only member who stayed in contact with family during the attacks' planning stage. His family tried to influence him away from Islamism, and he may have even had doubts about participating in the hijackings. In mid-2001, while living in the U.S., he briefly left his role as a presumptive hijacker, either once or twice.

Bin al-Shibh had been selected by al-Qaeda's higher-ups to be a hijacker, and he made a video where he proclaimed he was going to be a martyr. However, he was unable to get an American travel visa, so he instead acted as a liaison between the cell and al-Qaeda's leadership. This involved multiple jobs, including notifying the cell of wire transfers from the higher-ups. El-Motassadeq helped with logistics, and paid some members' bills, such as the students' tuitions. He also had power of attorney over al-Shehhi's bank account, and signed Atta's will. Bahaji was the cell's computer expert, and Essabar helped them tamper with and forge passports.

In January 2000, to hide their time in Afghanistan from security officials at international airports, Atta and al-Shehhi reported their passports as stolen and received blank duplicates; Jarrah did the same in February. The three left Germany for the U.S. later that year, and enrolled at Huffman Aviation, a flight school in Venice, Florida. Bin al-Shibh helped the three men find the school, and sent them $120,000 USD for living expenses in America, including going to the school. el-Motassadeq kept paying the rent on their homes in Germany to make it look like they planned to come back. Essabar left Hamburg for Pakistan on 30 August 2001, so he could cross the Afghanistan border to tell the leaders of al-Qaeda the date of the attacks. Bahaji left for Pakistan on 3 September, and possibly stayed there.

== Aftermath ==
On 9/11, Atta, al-Shehhi, and Jarrah died from their respective hijackings. 2,977 people were killed in the attacks. The U.S. then began the "war on terror", a worldwide military and law enforcement campaign against Islamist terrorism. Around 2002, at the start of an international manhunt for bin Laden, he secretly fled to Pakistan. He likely stayed there until 2011, when he was killed in a raid by American soldiers. One theater of the manhunt was the War in Afghanistan, in which the U.S. dissolved and replaced the Taliban's government. The Taliban fought back and reformed the government in 2021. Khalid Sheikh Mohammed also hid in Pakistan, where in 2002, he first confessed to his involvement in 9/11. He was captured in 2003, and put in U.S. custody. He was sent to the Guantanamo Bay detention camp in Cuba, which the U.S. opened in 2002 to house confirmed or suspected militants and terrorists.

The 2001 Hamburg state election in Germany, held less than two weeks after 9/11, saw a great surge for right-wing populist party Party for a Rule of Law Offensive led by local judge Ronald Schill who often applied maximum penalties during his rulings, in the general feeling of vulnerability and insecurity, as three of the suicide terrorists had lived in Hamburg in the 1990s. It resulted in the end 44 years of Hamburg's SPD-led (center-)left-wing governments.

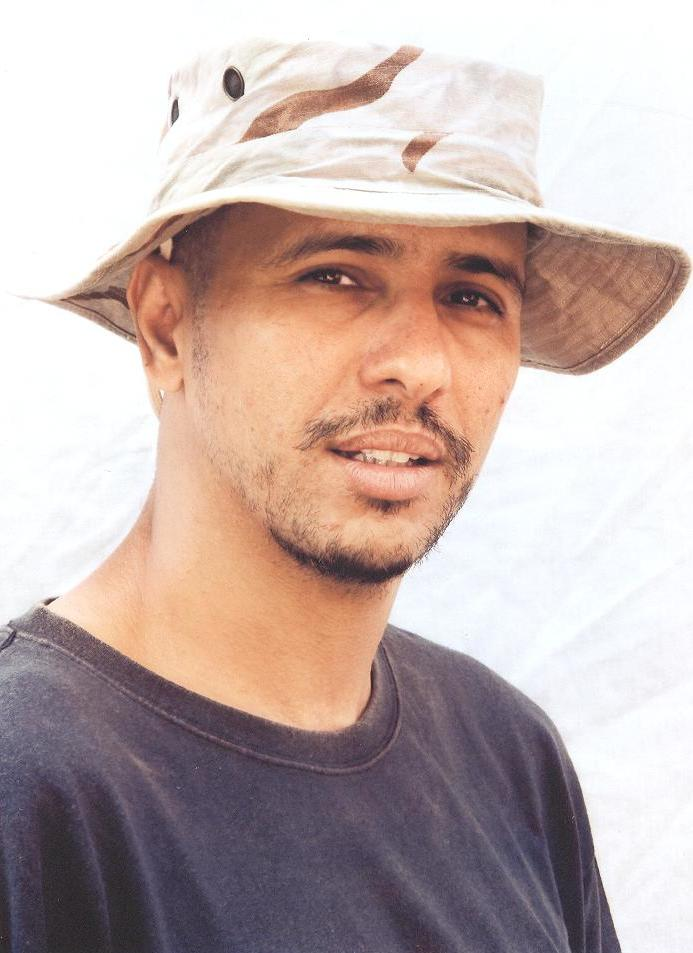
Mohamedou Ould Slahi was falsely accused of introducing the cell to al-Qaeda.

=== Mohamedou Ould Slahi ===
In 2004, the 9/11 Commission claimed that Mohamedou Ould Slahi, a Mauritanian man, played a role in the cell traveling to Afghanistan after meeting al-Masri on the train to Chechnya. While the cell were active, German and American intelligence believed Slahi was connected to al-Qaeda, but did not know he was living in Germany. He was running an import-export business in Duisburg, and the commission alleged that on the train, al-Masri asked the cell to visit a man named "Abu Musab"—Slahi—in the city. There, Slahi supposedly warned them it was hard to cross the border into Chechnya, and said they should instead go to Pakistan, to rendezvous with al-Qaeda operatives who could get them across the Afghan border. Soon after 9/11, Slahi was captured by the U.S., who sent him to Guantanamo. He was imprisoned there until 2016, when a court at the camp found that the 9/11 Commission's findings regarding him were false. During the presidency of George W. Bush, Slahi was subject to "enhanced interrogation techniques", the administration's name for the systematic torture of inmates at American detention centers across the world.

=== Ramzi bin al-Shibh ===
In July 2001, Atta met Ramzi bin al-Shibh in Spain to go over details of the plot, and make the final decision of what the hijackers' targets were. Bin al-Shibh told him that bin Laden wanted the attacks to happen as soon as possible. Shortly after 9/11, German officials stated bin al-Shibh likely moved to Pakistan or Afghanistan, while Pakistani officials said they had no record of him entering the country. The U.S. announced he was wanted for connections to the cell.

In 2002, bin al-Shibh was captured by Pakistan in Karachi, and then given to the U.S. Bin al-Shibh was put in custody of the CIA, who, for four years, tortured him at various black sites they were operating worldwide. While in custody, his lawyer put out the aforementioned statement from him that the Hamburg cell's only members were him, Atta, al-Shehhi, and Jarrah. This is mentioned in a CBSNews.com article timestamped 2002, but the article was likely written in 2004, and suggests the statement was released in August 2003.

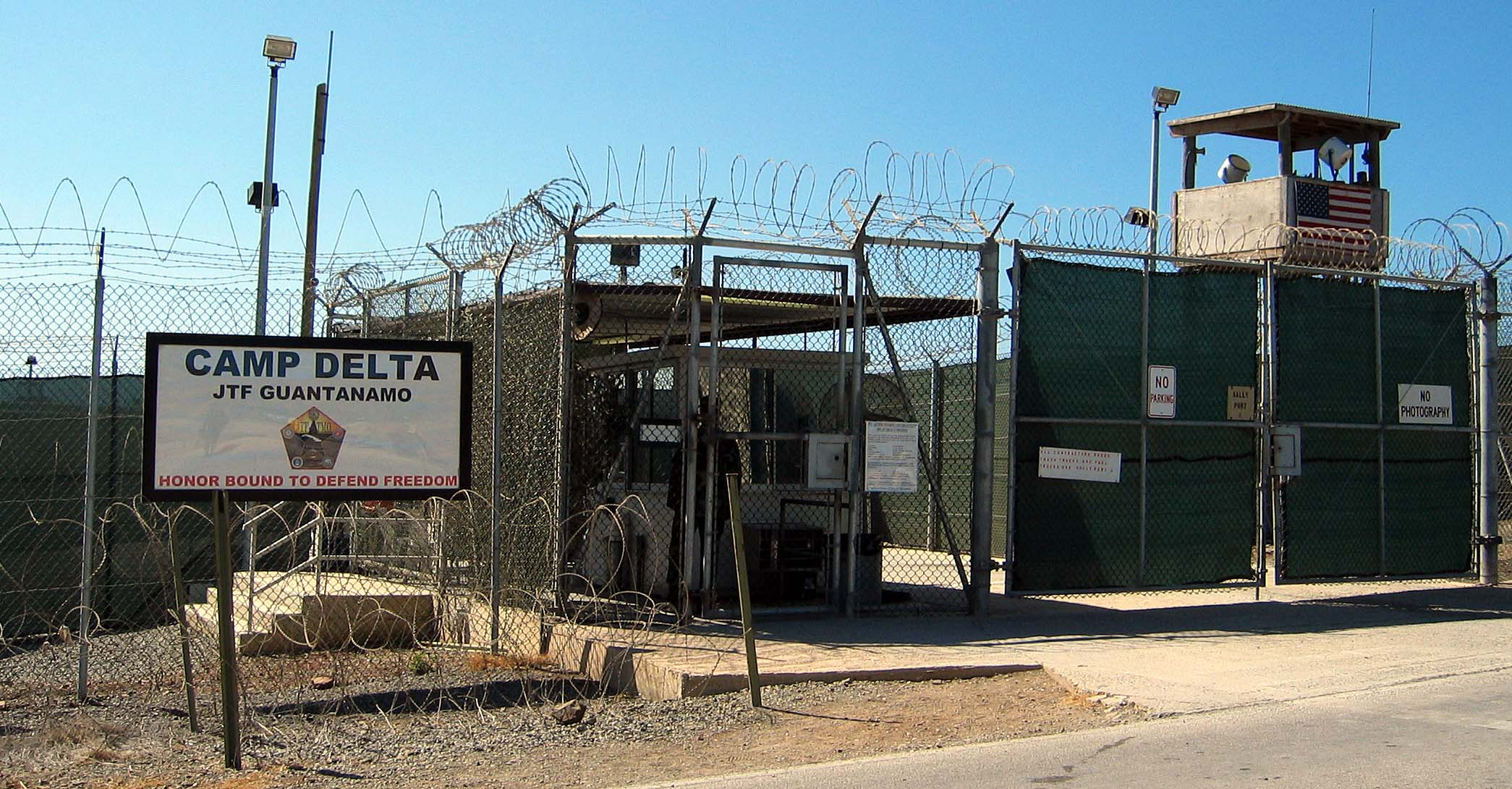
Ramzi bin al-Shibh was detained at Camp Delta within the Guantanamo Bay detention camp.

In 2006, the CIA sent bin al-Shibh to Guantanamo. Like Slahi, he was tortured by camp officials. In 2008, he was charged at the camp's court for being involved in the cell. He planned to defend himself in a subsequent trial, despite having admitted to being a member. In a trial that started in 2012 and continued for years, he was jointly prosecuted with four other accused planners of 9/11: Khalid Sheikh Mohammed, Ammar al-Baluchi, Mustafa al-Hawsawi, and Walid bin Attash. In 2023, bin al-Shibh's lawyers successfully argued he was not mentally able to defend himself in a joint case due to psychological strain from years of torture by the CIA and camp officials. A judge then moved him to a separate trial, which is still planned to happen as of 2025.

=== Mounir el-Motassadeq and Abdelghani Mzoudi ===
Mounir el-Motassadeq was arrested in Germany two months after 9/11, and charged him with being involved in the cell. Around that time, his friend Abdelghani Mzoudi was also arrested there. Sometime after the U.S. had captured both bin al-Shibh and Khalid Sheikh Mohammed, German prosecutors requested the U.S. that both of them be made to testify in el-Motassadeq's trial. The U.S. refused. Still, he was found guilty, and later in 2003, was sentenced to 15 years in prison. However, his conviction was then thrown out, when a court determined his trial should have included the aforementioned testimonies. El-Motassadeq was released from prison, then arrested again, and a new trial began. The U.S. similarly did not allow bin al-Shibh and Mohammed to testify in Mzoudi's trial. He was acquitted in 2004, as without the testimonies, prosecutors did not have a strong enough case against him. He was deported to Morocco in 2005. El-Motassadeq was convicted in 2006, and imprisoned from 2007 to 2018. Upon his release, he was also deported to Morocco.

=== Mohammed Haydar Zammar ===
After 9/11, Germany believed Mohammed Haydar Zammar had connections to the attacks, but when he made plans to visit Morocco in October, German authorities did not have enough evidence on him to deny him a temporary passport. He left for Morocco on 27 October, and disappeared from German intelligence's view until June 2002, when Morocco announced they had arrested Zammar, and that the U.S. helped them to deport him to Syria for interrogation by American officials. Syria had allied the U.S. in the war on terror to help with their significant terrorist problem. German authorities disliked the U.S. not telling them they were sending a German citizen to a country where human rights were not really considered by its concurrent government. Zammar was imprisoned there until 2014, when he was released in a prisoner exchange between Syria and Islamic militant group Ahrar al-Sham. He then joined the Islamic State, a militant organization who had de facto control of northern Iraq and Syria in the mid-2010s, and did numerous jobs for them. In 2018, he was captured in Syria, and imprisoned there again.

=== Said Bahaji, Zakariya Essabar, and Ahmed Taleb ===
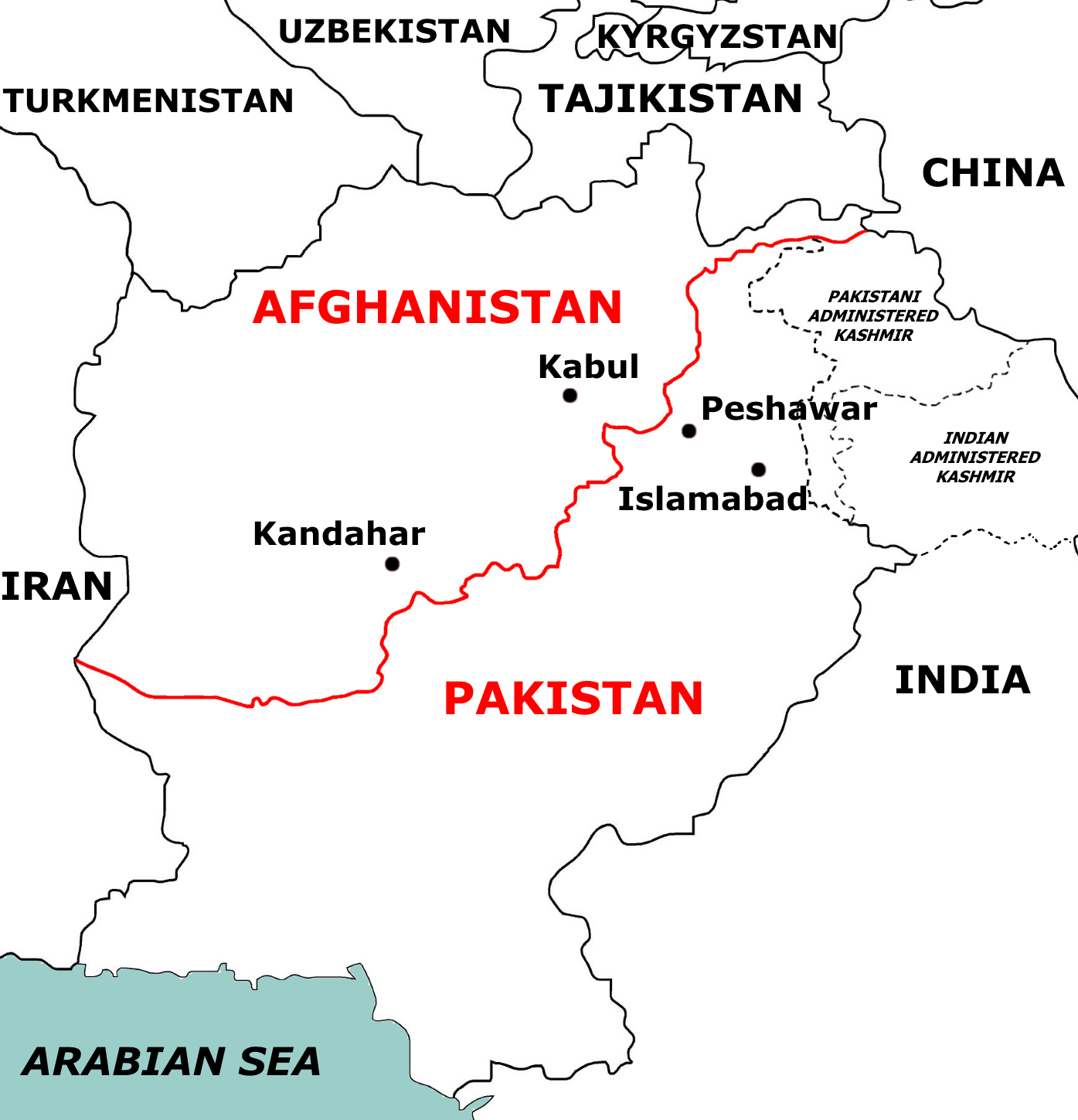
The Pakistani Taliban have taken territory along the Afghanistan–Pakistan border, including a town Said Bahaji may have been in 2009.

Like with bin al-Shibh, shortly after the attacks: Germany stated Said Bahaji had likely moved to Pakistan or Afghanistan, Pakistan said they had no record of him coming there, and the U.S. announced he was wanted. By 2010, Germany and Spain issued warrants for Bahaji's arrest. From 2001 to 2010, evidence was found supporting his entry into Pakistan. Between 9/11 and 2004, he sent letters and emails to relatives in Germany; they were discovered by authorities, who traced them back to Pakistan, though not to a specific address. At some point, he may have associated with the Pakistani Taliban, who, during the war on terror, captured ungoverned de facto territory of the Afghan and Pakistani governments along their border; during the skirmishes there in 2009, Pakistani authorities took back a Taliban-controlled town, and found there a supposed Pakistani passport issued to Bahaji. According to the U.N. Security Council, he then died at the border in 2013. However, as of 2025, Germany still has an active arrest warrant for him.

Zakariya Essabar was the third cell member that Germany stated was likely in Afghanistan or Pakistan, and that the U.S. announced was wanted. These statements came from a Washington Post article on the 23rd; unlike bin al-Shibh and Bahaji, the article did not mention if Pakistan had a record of Essabar entering their borders. Germany issued a warrant for Essabar's arrest by 2004, and as of 2011, his whereabouts are still unknown.

On 3 September 2001, Bahaji took a flight from Hamburg to Istanbul, alongside two male passengers named on the flight manifest as "Abdellah Hosayni" and "Ammar Moula"; these were likely not their real names, as their passports—French and Belgian, respectively—were found to be fake. German investigators believe "Moula" was Ahmed Taleb, and "Hosayni" was Ismail Ben Mrabete—both were Algerian men in their late 40s, who were alleged by an informant to German police to have been at an al-Qaeda camp in Afghanistan alongside Bahaji and Essabar after 9/11. The flight tickets for "Hosayni" and "Moula" were notably purchased long before 9/11—on 14 August. It is known that after the flight, Taleb traveled to Karachi and Quetta, Pakistan. In Karachi, he stayed at the Karachi Embassy Hotel alongside Bahaji, Mrabete, and Mohammed Belfatmi, an al-Qaeda member from Algeria. Quetta is located near the Afghan border, and was a "popular jumping-off point" for people who wanted to travel into Afghanistan for terrorist activities.

=== Naamen Meziche ===
At some point on or around 9/11, Naamen Meziche left Hamburg for Afghanistan, and by 2011, he was rumored to have died there.

=== Mamoun Darkazanli ===
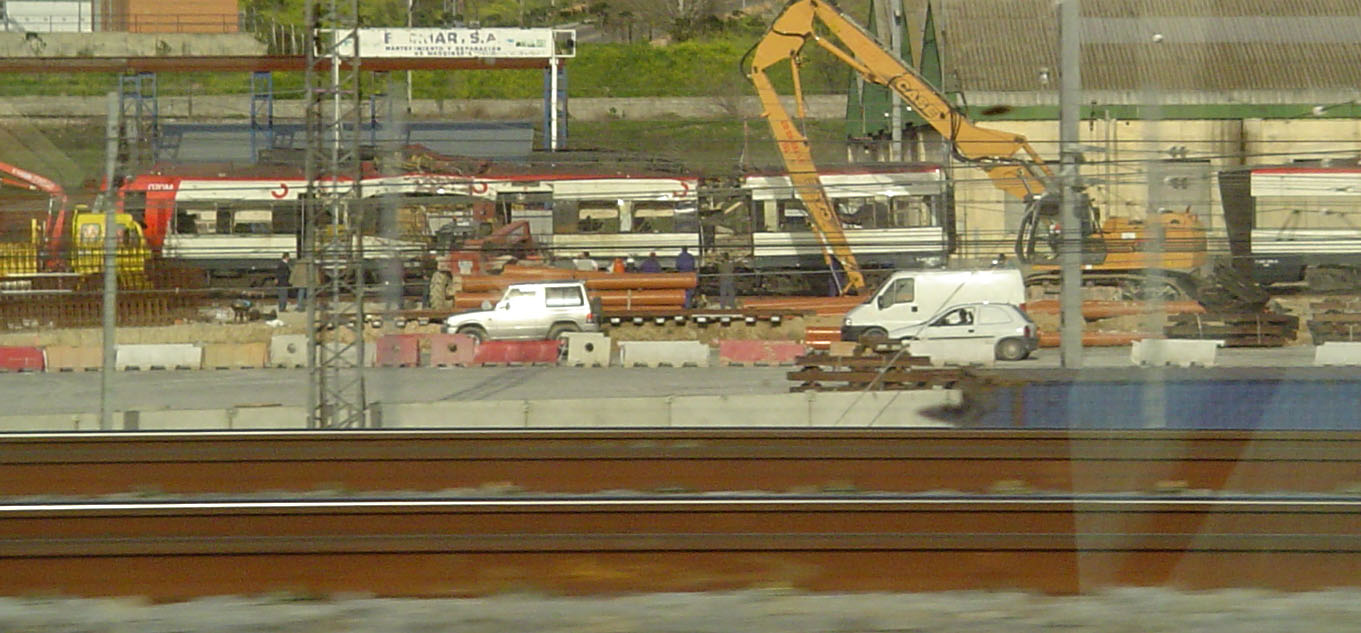
Spain accused Mamoun Darkazanli of being involved in the 2004 bombings of multiple trains in Madrid; pictured is the aftermath of one of them.

Mamoun Darkazanli was not arrested for being in the Hamburg cell. Instead, in 2004, Spain issued a European Union (EU) warrant for his arrest, alleging he was involved in a different al-Qaeda cell that supposedly committed the Madrid train bombings earlier that year. An attempt to extradite Darkazanli back to Spain was blocked by a judge in Germany, and then German authorities found that the EU arrest warrant violated Germany's constitution, so in 2005, he was freed. In 2006, Spain concluded that the Madrid bombings were not done by an al-Qaeda cell, but rather an independent group.

=== al-Quds Mosque ===
The al-Quds Mosque stayed open after 9/11, despite Germany knowing it had ties to jihadist terrorism. During this time, it possibly continued having a connection to al-Qaeda via a frequent visitor named Ahmad Sidiqi. He lived in Hamburg from 2001 to 2009, and then left for Pakistan, where he trained at multiple Islamic militant camps. In July 2010, Sidiqi was captured in Afghanistan, and interrogated at Bagram prison there. Notably, the U.S. tortured Bagram's prisoners in the 2000s, and might have still done so by 2012. According to the U.S., Sidiqi told them that bin Laden had recently ordered al-Qaeda to conduct terrorist attacks across Europe, which would be similar to the 2008 Mumbai attacks done by Lashkar e-Taiba. Sidiqi supposedly also said that at one training camp, he met Bahaji. In August 2010, German authorities raided and shut down the mosque for links to terrorism. In October, a drone strike killed five people in Pakistan; the perpetrators are unknown, but before Sidiqi's capture, he may have provided the target location to al-Qaeda. Bin Laden's plot was ultimately foiled by European authorities.

== Members ==
The following is a list of all cell members described by officials in Germany, the U.S., and Spain, detailing what happened to them during or after the attacks, and if other sources describe them a member:

Cell members according to international investigators
Member	Birth/citizenship countries	Fate or current status	Ref.
Mohamed Atta 1968–2001	Egypt	Died as the hijacker-pilot of American Airlines Flight 11 on 9/11	
Marwan al-Shehhi 1978–2001	United Arab Emirates	Died as the hijacker-pilot of United Airlines Flight 175 on 9/11	
Ziad Jarrah 1975–2001	Lebanon	Died as the hijacker-pilot of United Airlines Flight 93 on 9/11	
Ramzi bin al-Shibh b. 1972	Yemen	Captured by Pakistan and given to the U.S. in 2002; Held in CIA custody until transfer to Guantanamo Bay in 2006; Tortured by American officials at CIA black sites and Guantanamo; First appeared in court in 2008 on charges of planning 9/11; Has been on trial since 2012	
Mamoun Darkazanli b. 1958	Syria (Birth country); Germany	Arrested by Germany for allegedly participating in the 2004 Madrid bombings in Spain; Extradition back to Spain was blocked by a judge; Released in Germany in 2005	
Mohammed Haydar Zammar b. 1961	Syria (Birth country); Germany	Arrested by Morocco after 9/11 and extradited to Syria; Released in 2014 as part of a prisoner exchange; Joined the Islamic State soon after, and was captured in 2018; Imprisoned in Syria again that year	
Naamen Meziche	Algeria (Birth country); France	Captured in Pakistan; Extradited to France in 2013	
Said Bahaji 1975–prob. 2013	Germany (Birth country); Morocco	Fled Germany to Pakistan on 3 September 2001, and possibly stayed there; In 2009, a supposed Pakistani passport of his was found in a previously Taliban-controlled town; Died at the Afghanistan-Pakistan border in 2013, according to the United Nations; Still has an active arrest warrant by Germany	
Zakariya Essabar b. 1977	Morocco	Fled Germany to Pakistan in August 2001, and then went to Afghanistan to communicate with al-Qaeda; Possibly killed fighting with al-Qaeda against American forces in Afghanistan in 2003, yet this has never been independently confirmed; At large as of 2011	
Mounir el-Motassadeq b. 1974	Morocco	Arrested by Germany months after 9/11, and was charged with being in the cell; Convicted in 2003 and sentenced to 15 years in prison, but after being imprisoned, the case was thrown out; Was then freed, arrested by Germany again, then put on trial for a second time; Convicted in 2006, and imprisoned from 2007 to 2018; Deported to Morocco in 2018	
Abdelghani Mzoudi b. 1972	Morocco	Arrested by Germany after 9/11, put on trial, and was acquitted in 2004; Deported to Morocco in 2005	
Ahmed Taleb b. 1952/53	Birth country N/A; from Algeria	Allegedly left Germany for Turkey on 3 September 2001; Flew to Pakistan, then disappeared; perhaps crossed the border into Afghanistan; Alleged by a witness to have been at an al-Qaeda camp in Afghanistan	

== In popular culture ==
The film Hamburg Cell is a 2004 docudrama film on the planning and execution of 9/11.

The 2021 film The Mauritanian portrays Slahi's false arrest, imprisonment, and torture at Guantanamo.

== See also ==
- Brussels Islamic State terror cell
