= Abdelghani Mzoudi =

Moroccan terrorist

- Born: December 6, 1972 (age 53); Marrakesh, Morocco
- Arrested: Germany
- Citizenship: Morocco
- Alleged to be a member of: Hamburg cell

Abdelghani Mzoudi (/ɑːbdɛlˈɡɑːniː mˈzaʊdiː/; Arabic: عبد الغني مزودي; born 6 December 1972), also transliterated as Abdul Ghani Mzoudi, is an alleged member of al-Qaeda and an associate of Mohamed Atta, the ringleader of the September 11 attacks who also served as the hijacker-pilot of American Airlines Flight 11.

== Life ==
In 1999, Mzoudi lived in the Hamburg cell, an apartment owned by Atta, where many of the organizers of the September 11 attacks met and planned their future. His specific role in the attacks has not been determined, but he does not seem to have attempted to enter the United States at any time.

Mzoudi was captured and tried in Germany, along with Mounir el-Motassadeq, on charges relating to the 9/11 attacks. In their trials, both claimed Ramzi bin al-Shibh, a key planner of the attacks, would have given statements indicating their innocence. Both asked for the United States to present bin al-Shibh as a witness, and the judge agreed that this was a reasonable request. Although the German Justice Ministry pressed the U.S. to present bin al-Shibh, the United States refused, and Mzoudi was thereby acquitted in February 2004. Some observers believe that he would have been convicted had bin al-Shibh been made available as a witness. Ziad Jarrah's fiancée Aysel Sengün testified at Mzoudi's trial.

In June 2005, a German federal appeals court upheld the acquittal due to insufficient evidence for retrial. The German Interior Ministry was seeking to deport Mzoudi, though the defense team was considering asking for asylum.

Mzoudi was finally deported to Morocco where he now lives as a free man.
