= Said Bahaji =

German–Moroccan terrorist

- سعيد بحجي
- Born: 15 July 1975; Haselünne, Lower Saxony, West Germany
- Died: September 2013 (aged 38); Afghanistan–Pakistan border
- Citizenship: German, Moroccan
- Education: Technical University of Hamburg
- Occupations: Electrical engineer Computer technician al-Qaeda facilitator terrorist

Said Bahaji (Arabic: سعيد بحجي, also transliterated as Saeed Bahaji, also known as Zuhayr al-Maghribi, 15 July 1975 in Haselünne, Lower Saxony – sometime in September 2013), was a citizen of Germany, electrical engineer, and an alleged member of the Hamburg cell that provided money and material support to the perpetrators of the September 11 attacks.

== History ==
Bahaji was a German citizen, born in 1975 to a Moroccan father and a German mother. Raised in a small town in Lower Saxony, he moved with his family when he was nine years old to Morocco, where he completed his education. He came to Hamburg in 1995. He enrolled in an electrical engineering program at a technical university in 1996. He spent five months in the German army and then received a medical discharge. He lived in a student home during the weekdays and he spent weekends with his aunt, Barbara Arens. Both of them loved computers, and he called her his "high-tech aunt". She saw that he was secular until other students introduced him to radical Islam. She later put an end to the weekend visits.

On November 1, 1998, he moved into an apartment in Germany with future hijackers Mohamed Atta and Ramzi bin al-Shibh. The Hamburg cell was born at this apartment. They met three or four times a week to discuss their anti-American feelings and plot possible attacks. Many al-Qaeda members lived in this apartment at various times, including hijacker Marwan al-Shehhi, Zakariya Essabar, and others. He served as the group's Internet expert.

He had already been under investigation by German intelligence for his connections with Mohammed Haydar Zammar, a radical Islamic cleric. Through this, German intelligence was able to learn some of the activities of Atta and others, but the investigation was eventually dropped for lack of evidence.

In October 1999, he got married at the Al-Quds Mosque in Hamburg. Atta, Jarrah, Shehhi, Zammar, and bin al-Shibh all attended his wedding.

In late 1999, Atta, Shehhi, Jarrah, and bin al-Shibh decided to travel to Chechnya to fight against the Russians, but were convinced by Khalid al-Masri and Mohamedou Ould Slahi at the last minute to change their plans. They instead traveled to Afghanistan to meet with Osama bin Laden and train for terrorist attacks. There are conflicting reports as to whether he went with them; some news reports say that he went, but the 9/11 Commission Report says he stayed in Germany and helped cover for them in their absence. When the group returned to Germany, he was put on a border patrol watch list.

He told his employer in June 2001 that he was going to an internship for a software company in Pakistan. His aunt, Barbara Arens, says that she was suspicious and that she went to the police and pleaded to them "to do something." She says that police took no action against him. Al-Qaeda leader Khalid Sheikh Mohammed told him in August that if he wanted to go to Afghanistan, he should go in the next few weeks, because it would soon become more difficult. He left Germany on September 4, 2001, just a week before the attacks, and flew to Karachi via Istanbul.

== Aftermath of the attacks ==
He and Ramzi bin al-Shibh were charged with 5,000 counts of murder by German officials. Bin al-Shibh was arrested on 11 September 2002, but Bahaji was still at large at the time.

It is reported that Bahaji's leg was injured in fighting with Coalition forces in Afghanistan in late 2001. In the following years, it was reported that Bahaji was working for As-Sahab, the media wing of al-Qaeda.

During the October 2009, Pakistan military operation against terrorists in South Waziristan, his German passport was found in a captured militant town. This region, part of the tribal areas, had become a sanctuary for al-Qaeda and other jihadist groups following the collapse of the Taliban regime in Afghanistan in late 2001.

In mid-2010, Bahaji reportedly reunited with Naamen Meziche, a longtime acquaintance from Hamburg. According to Der Spiegel, the meeting was described as a joyful gathering of old veterans. In the same meeting Bahaji met with Ahmad Wali Sidiqi, who was implicated in the 2010 European terror plot. During interrogation by German and American intelligence at Bagram Airfield in Afghanistan, Sidiqi revealed that Bahaji was walking with a limp, likely from the leg injury sustained in fighting.

== Death ==
In August 2017, the Associated Press reported that al-Qaeda leader Ayman al-Zawahiri announced in an audio message that Bahaji (referring to him by his alias "Zuhayr al-Maghrebi") had died but did not say when or how he died. In a list published by the United Nations Security Council of people and entities against whom there are sanctions, Bahaji is said to be "reportedly deceased in September 2013 in the Afghanistan/Pakistan border area."

However, the German BKA still maintains an active wanted notice for Bahaji, which was last updated in June 2024.
