= Mounir el-Motassadeq =

Moroccan al-Qaeda member (born 1974)

Mounir el-Motassadeq (Arabic: منير المتصدق; born 3 April 1974) is a Moroccan former member of al-Qaeda. He was convicted by a German court of being a member of al-Qaeda and of assisting some of the hijackers in the September 11 attacks. He was initially convicted of involvement in the attack, but his sentence was set aside on appeal, then reinstated on further appeal. On 8 January 2007, he was sentenced to serve 15 years by the court of Hanseatisches Oberlandesgericht, Hamburg, because of 246 counts of accessory to murder in coincidence with membership in a terrorist organisation. On 15 October 2018, el-Motassadeq was deported to Morocco after serving his sentence.

== Biography ==
Motassadeq first came to Germany from Morocco in 1993 and moved to Hamburg in 1995, where he studied electrical engineering in college. Not much is known of his activities at this time, but he did move into the Hamburg cell apartment owned by Mohamed Atta and lived with several other people who would later be accused by the U.S. and German authorities of leading the September 11, 2001, attacks.

On 22 May 2000, Motassadeq flew to Istanbul, and from there to Afghanistan. He soon returned. When the four 9/11 leaders went from Germany to Afghanistan to train, Motassadeq remained in Germany. German police wiretapped Motassadeq, but did not discover any incriminating information initially. He claims his innocence, "There never was a terrorist organization in Hamburg," he stated.

== Legal proceedings ==
At Motassadeq's trial, Aysel Sengün, the girlfriend of one of the hijackers, Ziad Jarrah, was called to testify regarding her relationship with Jarrah and his role in the plot. Motassadeq said he did not know anything about a plot and the trial never established that Motassadeq had knowledge of the details of the attacks. Nevertheless, the judge stated that he had assisted the plot by paying his friends' tuition and rent to keep up their appearance of being students. Mounir el Motassadeq was a friend of Mohamed Atta, Marwan al-Shehhi and Ziad Jarrah and "a member of their prayer group".

In February 2003, he was convicted in Germany of 3,066 counts of accessory to murder. He was convicted in direct relation to the September 11 attacks, but the conviction was rejected on appeal. Though the German Justice Ministry pressed the United States to allow Ramzi bin al-Shibh to testify, the U.S. refused, and the verdict and sentence were set aside.

Motassadeq was re-tried and convicted on August 19, 2005, of "membership in a "terrorist organization". That conviction was also rejected on appeal.

On 7 February 2006, Germany's Federal Constitutional Court ordered an early release of Motassadeq. The highest court of Germany ruled there was an absence of proof that Motassadeq was informed about the September 11 terrorist plot.

On 15 November 2006, the German Federal Court of Justice ruled on the appeals: They considered the evidence as sufficient to prove that Motassadeq knew about and was involved in the preparation of the plan to hijack the planes and was hence guilty as an accessory in 246 counts of murder. This is the number of victims that allegedly died in the plane crashes, but does not include the victims on the ground. The Oberlandesgericht (state high court) in Hamburg then took up the trial again in order to decide on the sentencing. Two days later, the Federal Court of Justice also revoked the release order, and Motassadeq was arrested again. On January 8, 2007, he was sentenced by the Oberlandesgericht Hamburg to 15 years in prison. The Federal Constitutional Court of Germany refused to revise his sentence. On May 2, the German Federal Court of Justice rejected a plea for revision. As of 2011, his lawyers were considering both appealing to the European Court of Human Rights and trying to get the case reopened – his two remaining legal options.

Ahmad Wali Siddiqui, whose interrogation triggered a 2010 terror alert, was a friend of Motassadeq since 1997 who also patronized the mosque attended by many other alleged Hamburg-based 9/11 plotters. The al-Quds or Taiba mosque was closed down by officials in August 2010 because it allegedly became an attraction for Muslim extremists.

On 15 October 2018, el-Motassadeq was deported via Hamburg Airport to Morocco, where his family lives, after he had served his sentence imprisoned in JVA Fuhlsbüttel prison, Hamburg.

== See also ==
- Planning of the September 11 attacks
