= Al-Quds Mosque =

Mosque in Hamburg, Germany

al-Quds Mosque
- Arabic: مسجد القدس; German: al-Quds-Moschee
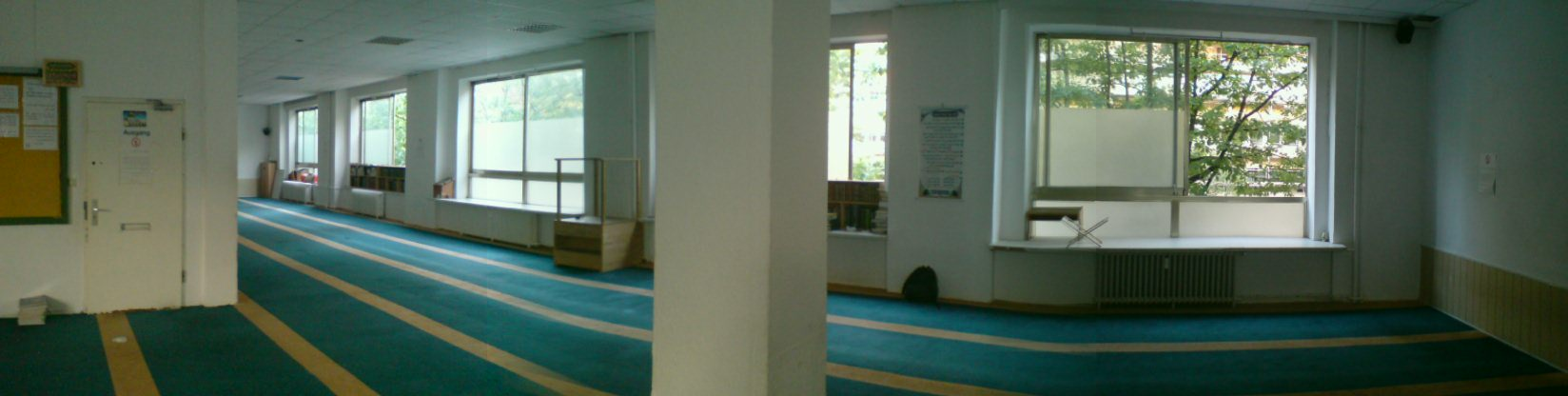
- Panoramic interior of al-Quds, in 2009, prior to its closure

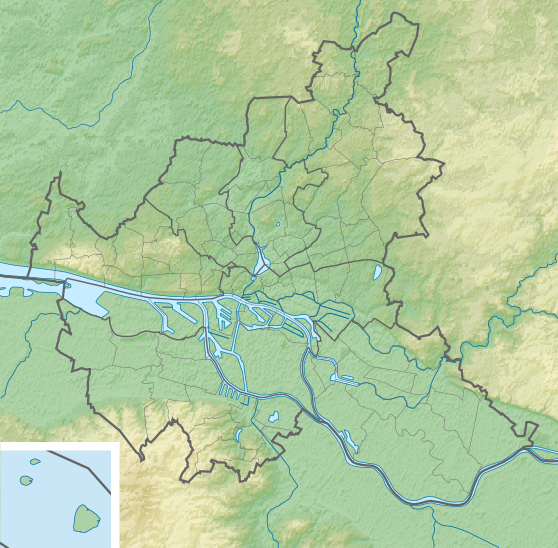
- Location of the former mosque in Hamburg

Religion
- Affiliation: Sunni Islam (former)
- Ecclesiastical or organisational status: Mosque (1993–2010)
- Status: Closed

Location
- Location: St. Georg, Hamburg
- Country: Germany
- Coordinates: 53°33′25″N 10°01′10″E

Architecture
- Type: Mosque architecture
- Completed: 1993
- Capacity: 400 male worshippers

The al-Quds Mosque (Arabic: مسجد القدس, romanized: Masjid al-Quds, lit. 'The Jerusalem Mosque'; German: al-Quds-Moschee) was a Sunni Muslim mosque, located in Hamburg, Germany. The mosque was opened in 1993 and operated until 2010 when it was shut down by German security officials.

The mosque was known for preaching a radical form of Sunni Islam. The al-Quds Mosque was attended by some of the September 11 attackers including Mohamed Atta, Marwan al-Shehhi, Ramzi bin al-Shibh, and Ziad Jarrah who formed the Hamburg cell.

== History ==
The mosque opened in 1993 and was run by the Taiba German-Arab Cultural Association. It occupied a three-story building near the Hamburg Hauptbahnhof rail station in a red-light district, in the St. Georg section of Hamburg.

Unlike many other mosques in Hamburg which cater to the Turkish and Kurdish populations, al-Quds served Hamburg's smaller Arab population. Under the leadership of Imam Muhammad Fizazi (fr), the mosque preached a radical militant version of Sunni Islam. Other leaders at the mosque have included Sheikh Azid al-Kirani.

== Overview ==
The prayer room for men was located on the first floor and was able to accommodate up to 400. There was a separate prayer room for women, which was unpainted and uncarpeted. On Fridays, the mosque usually had around 250 in attendance.

By 2004, the mosque had, according to security authorities, become a meeting point for North Africans and Iraqi proponents of jihadism. By 2009, the mosque had become a place where members of the Salafi movement traveled to meet.

== Shutdown ==
The mosque was shut down by German security officials in August 2010 amid suspicion that the mosque was again being used as a meeting place for Islamic extremists involved in the 2010 European terror plot. German authorities discovered that ten members of the mosque had traveled to the border region of Pakistan and Afghanistan, and Shahab D., an Iranian at the mosque, had joined the Islamic Movement of Uzbekistan.

== See also ==
- Islam in Germany
- List of mosques in Europe § Germany
