= Assem Jarrah =

Lebanese spy

Assem Omar Jarrah (Arabic: عاصم جراح, ‘Āsim Jarrāḥ; born 1962 in Lebanon) is conflictingly reported as either the great-uncle or distant cousin of Ziad Jarrah, one of the hijackers of the September 11 attacks. His work permit was found in the smouldering remains of United Airlines Flight 93 along with Ziad's charred passport.

Jarrah enrolled in Hamburg University in 1982.

In autumn 1985 he signed up for pharmacy in University of Greifswald (East Germany) and graduated in 1990. Later he became a manager with the Lebanon division of Fresenius (company). His work included the sale of chemical and medical equipment to national governments.

In the 1980s, Assem had served with Libyan intelligence, and worked alongside Abu Nidal, before aligning himself with Stasi where he was codenamed Karsten Berg.

He disappeared in July 2001, after claiming that he was returning to Lebanon - and resurfaced after the attacks, claiming that he was going to sue Der Spiegel for libel, for their report that he had worked with intelligence agencies.
