= Mamoun Darkazanli =

Syrian–German member of al-Qaeda

Mamoun Darkazanli (Arabic: مأمون داركازنلي; born August 4, 1958, in Aleppo, Syria) is a citizen of Germany and Syria who is wanted in Spain on terrorism charges.

He was arrested on October 15, 2004 in Hamburg on a Spanish warrant, but freed on July 18, 2005 after a ruling by the Federal Constitutional Court of Germany. Darkazanli is under sanction, as affiliate or supporter of al-Qaeda, by the United Nations, by the European Union, and by the United States Treasury as a Specially Designated Global Terrorist. His company in Hamburg, called Mamoun Darkazanli Import-Export Company or Darkazanli Export-Import Sonderposten, until recently was listed as well.
