= Ramzi bin al-Shibh =

Yemeni terrorist (born 1972)

- رمزي بن الشيبة
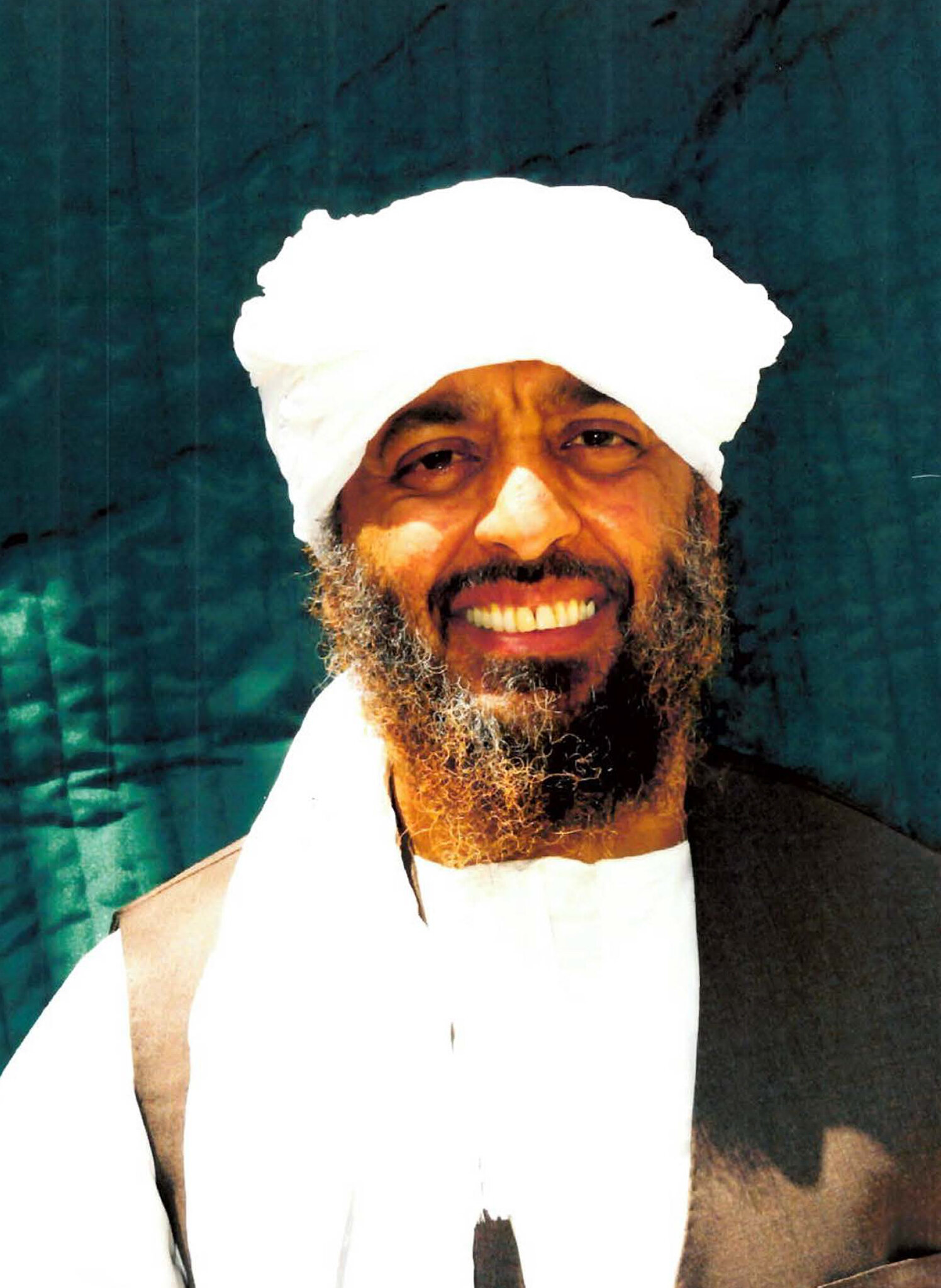
- Bin al-Shibh in Guantanamo, circa 2023
- Born: Ramzi Mohammed Abdullah bin al-Shibh; May 1, 1972 (age 54); Ghayl Ba Wazir, Yemen
- Other name: Abu Ubaidah
- Criminal charges: Charged before a military commission in 2008; trial started in October 2012
- Criminal status: At the Guantanamo Bay detention camp since 2002
- Military career
- Allegiance: Al-Qaeda
- Service years: 1990s–2002
- Rank: Communication officer: Afghan Civil War; War in North-West Pakistan

Ramzi Mohammed Abdullah bin al-Shibh (Arabic: رمزي محمد عبد الله بن الشيبة, romanized: Ramzī Muḥammad ʻAbd Allāh bin al-Shībh; born May 1, 1972) is a Yemeni terrorist who served as al-Qaeda's communications officer. He has been detained by the United States in the Guantanamo Bay detention camp (NSGB) since 2006. He was a "key facilitator" of the September 11 attacks in 2001.

In the mid-1990s, bin al-Shibh moved to Hamburg, Germany, for studies. There, he became close friends with September 11 hijackers Mohamed Atta, Ziad Jarrah, and Marwan al-Shehhi. They were members of the Hamburg cell, which planned the details of the attacks. bin al-Shibh was the only one of the four who failed to obtain a U.S. visa; he acted as an intermediary for the hijackers in the United States, by wiring money and passing on information from key al-Qaeda figures. After the attacks, bin al-Shibh was the first to be publicly identified by the U.S. as the "20th hijacker", for whom there have been several more possible candidates.

Bin al-Shibh has been in United States custody since he was captured in Karachi, Pakistan, in 2002. He was in custody of the Central Intelligence Agency (CIA) before being transferred to Guantanamo Bay in 2006. Finally charged in 2008 before a military commission, he and several others suspected in the 9/11 attacks went to trial beginning in May 2012. In 2023, a U.S. military judge ruled him too psychologically damaged to defend himself after CIA torture.

== Early life ==
Ramzi bin al-Shibh was born on May 1, 1972, in Ghayl Ba Wazir, Hadhramaut, South Yemen. When he was young, his family moved to a working-class neighborhood in the capital, Sanaa. In 1987, his father died. He was cared for by his older brother, Ahmed, and his mother.

In 1987, while still in high school, bin al-Shibh began working part-time as a clerk for the International Bank of Yemen. He continued working there until 1995.

Bin al-Shibh applied for a U.S. visa in 1995, but his request was denied. He instead went to Germany, where he requested political asylum, claiming that he was a political refugee from Sudan. He lived in Hamburg until 1997, when a judge refused his asylum request.

Bin al-Shibh returned to the Hadramaut region of Yemen. A short while later he received a German visa under his real name. While he was in Germany, bin al-Shibh used the name Ramzi Omar. In 1997, bin al-Shibh met Mohamed Atta at the al-Quds Mosque; he was the leader of the Hamburg cell. For two years, Atta and bin al-Shibh were roommates in Germany.

== Connections to 9/11 attacks ==
In late 1999, bin al-Shibh traveled to Kandahar in Afghanistan, where he received training at al-Qaeda camps and met others involved in planning the September 11 attacks such as Khalid Sheikh Mohammed.

Original plans for the 9/11 attacks called for bin al-Shibh to be one of the hijacker pilots, along with three other members of the Hamburg cell, including Atta, Marwan al-Shehhi, and Ziad Jarrah. From Hamburg, bin al-Shibh applied to take flight training in the United States. At that time, he also applied to Aviation Language Services, which provides language training for student pilots. Bin al-Shibh applied four times for an entry visa to the United States and was refused each time. He made visa applications in Germany on May 17, 2000, again in June, and on September 16 and October 25, 2000.

According to the 9/11 Commission, this refusal of a visa was motivated by general concern by U.S. officials at the time that people from Yemen, which was struggling economically, would illegally overstay their visit and seek work in the United States. His friend, Zakariyah Essabar, was also denied visas. After failing to gain a visa to enter the United States, bin al-Shibh took on a "coordinator" role in the plot, serving as a link between Atta in the United States and Khalid Sheikh Mohammed in Afghanistan. Bin al-Shibh was the first to be publicly identified by the United States as the "20th hijacker," someone who was thought to have been tasked to fill out the single missing slot among the four terrorist five-person teams. This spot was never filled. United Airlines Flight 93 had four hijackers, not five, which is believed in part to have led to the success of the passenger revolt — the crash of the plane near Shanksville, Pennsylvania was likely caused by the passengers.

Bin al-Shibh interacted extensively with the hijackers. In August 2000, Ziad Jarrah tried to enroll bin al-Shibh in a Florida flight school. Bin al-Shibh sent money via wire transfer on September 25, 2000, to Marwan al-Shehhi in Florida. In August 2001, bin al-Shibh sent approximately $14,000 to Zacarias Moussaoui, using the alias Ahad Sabet, a few days after receiving transfer of $15,000 from Hashim Abdulrahman in the United Arab Emirates.

Three weeks prior to the attacks, Saeed al-Ghamdi is believed to have used the name "Abdul Rahman" to message bin al-Shibh online (who was posing as a girlfriend), writing a reference to two military/governmental targets and two civilian targets, 19 hijackers and 4 hijacked planes:

The first semester commences in three weeks. Two high schools and two universities. ... This summer will surely be hot ...19 certificates for private education and four exams. Regards to the professor. Goodbye.

Bin al-Shibh later said that Atta had phoned him on the morning of August 29 to give a similar coded message revealing the date of the attacks.

== Other terrorism activities ==
Bin al-Shibh is suspected of having been involved in the 2000 USS Cole bombing, and the 2002 Ghriba synagogue bombing in Tunisia.

After January 14, 2002, bin al-Shibh was featured among five suspected al-Qaeda members on videos delivering what United States Attorney General John Ashcroft described as "martyrdom messages from suicide terrorists." Ashcroft said the five videotapes, shown by the FBI without sound, had been recovered from the rubble of the home of Mohammad Atef outside Kabul, Afghanistan. Ashcroft called upon people worldwide to help "identify, locate and incapacitate terrorists who are suspected of planning additional attacks against innocent civilians." The sound was left out to guard against the possibility that the messages contained signals for other terrorists. Ashcroft added that an analysis of the audio suggested "the men may be trained and prepared to commit future suicide terrorist acts." Ashcroft said not much was known about any of them except bin al-Shibh. The other three are still featured in compiled video clips, in order of appearance, Muhammad Sa'id Ali Hasan, Abd al-Rahim, and Khalid Ibn Muhammad al-Juhani. The fifth was identified a week later as Abderraouf Jdey, alias Al-Rauf bin al-Habib bin Yousef al-Jiddi.

On January 17, 2002, the FBI published the first Most Wanted Terrorists Seeking Information list (now known as the FBI Seeking Information – Terrorism list). They identified the five wanted terrorists, about whom little was known but who were suspected of plotting additional terrorist attacks in martyrdom operations. (see current version displaying photos of five terrorists on the remaining martyrdom videos FBI list, as of June 2006) Ramzi bin al-Shibh was one of the four men among the five whose names were known.

On September 8, 2006, al-Qaeda released a video that shows Osama bin Laden and some of the 9/11 hijackers. The tape identifies bin al-Shibh as the "coordinator of the 9/11 attacks" in its English subtitles. The video shows bin al-Shibh and other hijackers training in kickboxing, as well as disarming and concealing weapons at a terrorist training camp in or near Kandahar, Afghanistan.

== Capture and detention ==
Bin al-Shibh was captured in Pakistan on September 11, 2002, after a gun battle in Karachi with the Pakistani ISI and the CIA's Special Activities Division. On September 14, 2002, he was transferred to the United States. CIA officers transported him by extraordinary rendition to a secret black site in Morocco for interrogation. The CIA admitted in August 2010 that it has video tapes of these interrogations.

His profile was removed from the FBI Seeking Information wanted list by October 17, 2002. Bin al-Shibh was held by the U.S. at an undisclosed CIA-led location until September 2006. On September 6, 2006, U.S. president George W. Bush announced that bin al-Shibh and thirteen other CIA-held, high-value detainees had been transferred to Guantanamo Bay detention camp.

Bin al-Shibh is also wanted by German courts; he had shared a Hamburg apartment with Mohamed Atta, the suspected ringleader of the September 11 hijackers. In 2005, the USA denied a German request for bin al-Shibh's extradition. In an earlier extradition and trial, Abdelghani Mzoudi, a 9/11 suspect, was acquitted of German charges.

On June 12, 2008, the U.S. Supreme Court ruled, in Boumediene v. Bush (2008), that detainees had the right to access the federal court system in habeas challenges to their detention. It ruled that the Military Commissions Act of 2006, which had restricted their exercise of habeas corpus outside the military commission system, was unconstitutional in this respect. The first 22 captives who had pending habeas petitions in 2006 when the Act was passed, were allowed to re-initiate their petitions in August 2008.

=== Guantanamo military commission ===
Bin al-Shibh and four other captives classified as high value detainees (Khalid Sheikh Mohammed, Mustafa al-Hawsawi, Ammar al-Baluchi and Walid Bin Attash) were charged in Guantanamo military commissions in Spring 2008. The men triggered controversy when they announced that they did not want US-appointed attorneys and they planned to boycott their commissions. The military commissions, as authorized by George W. Bush, did not permit suspects to forgo legal representation, to act as their own attorneys, or to boycott their commissions. The commissions authorized by the Military Commissions Act of 2006, did authorize suspects to serve as their own attorneys.

The other four men eventually agreed to attend their commissions. Bin al-Shibh, however, has continued to refuse to attend. His appointed attorneys had expressed concern about him and his state of mental health. The top-secret location of Camp 7, where the high-value detainees are held, had been off limits to military attorneys. The individual detainees are hooded when they travel from the camp to their commission hearings.

Suzanne Lachelier, one of the attorneys and a reserve officer in the Judge Advocate General Corps, offered to wear a hood, in order to be taken to him when the camp authorities initially refused her examination of the prison. She finally gained approval from the military commission judge to see the prison in the autumn of 2008. To get to the prison, Lachelier and her co-counsel, Rich Federico, were taken in a windowless van that was used to transport detainees. They were the first defense lawyers to visit Camp 7.

The judge presiding over the commission's pre-trial motions ordered bin al-Shibh and Mustafa al-Hawsawi to undergo mental competency hearings. On December 8, 2008, Khalid Sheikh Mohammed told the judge that he, along with the other four men who had been indicted, wished to confess and plead guilty; however, they wished to delay their plea until after the competency hearings of bin al-Shibh and Hawsawi, because all five men wanted to make their pleas together.

On May 17, 2010, Saba News reported that Bin al-Shibh and four other Yemenis would face charges in the summer of 2010. Two other Yemenis to face charges were: Walid Bin Atash and Abdul Rahim Al-Nasheri. Saba News did not name the fourth and fifth individuals.

In 2011, the lawyers of Bin al-Shibh argued that he may be unfit to stand trial and participate in his own defense. They have asked that the proceedings against him and his four co-accused be stayed until his mental state is determined. They say he has been prescribed psychotropic drugs of the sort that are used to treat schizophrenia. Bin al-Shibh claims that he is mentally fit, has denounced his lawyers, and says that he wants to represent himself before the commissions.

In October 2012, the U.S. began the trials of al-Shibh and the other four 9/11 defendants. On January 31, 2014, Carol Rosenberg, reporting in the Miami Herald, wrote that Pohl had to delay al-Shibh's trial again, because the panel of three military psychiatrists who tried to determine whether he was mentally competent to stand trial had not been able to reach a conclusion. Al-Shibh had not been prepared to answer the doctor's questions.

On August 24, 2023, Al-Shibh was declared unfit to stand trial by a U.S. tribunal when a military judge ruled him too psychologically damaged to defend himself due to his mental state, after lawyers argued 'CIA torture made him delusional and psychotic'. In January 2026, a military judge rejected a government request to restart death-penalty proceedings against bin al-Shibh.

== See also ==
- Shaker Aamer
