= Naamen Meziche =

French–Algerian member of al-Qaeda

- Organization: Al-Qaeda

Naamen Meziche is a French national of Algerian origin. According to Pakistani intelligence, he was a leader of al-Qaeda and is associated with terrorist groups in Europe.

Pakistani sources say that Meziche had worked closely with Younis al-Mauritani, an Al-Qaeda leader.

== Capture ==
Pakistan officials captured Naamen Meziche in a raid near the border with Iran sometime in the middle of June 2012.

Meziche was extradited to France in October 2013.
