= Zakariya Essabar =

Moroccan al-Qaeda member

- زكريا الصبار
- Born: 3 April 1977; Essaouira, Morocco
- Died: 2003 (aged 25–26); Shinkay District, Afghanistan
- Education: Hamburg University of Technology
- Years active: 1997–?
- Organization: Al-Qaeda

Zakariya Essabar (Arabic: زكريا الصبار, romanized: Zakariyā aṣ-Ṣabār) (3 April 1977–2003) was a Moroccan member of al-Qaeda who helped organize the September 11, 2001 attacks on the United States as part of the Hamburg cell.

Essabar was born in Morocco on 3 April 1977 and immigrated to Germany in 1997. In 1998, he studied medical technology at Hamburg University of Technology. Through the Muslim religious community there he met Ramzi bin al-Shibh and other members of the Hamburg cell. Essabar quickly became more religious while in Germany. He lived for some time at the Hamburg cell apartment. He reportedly pressured one acquaintance with force to become more religious and to compel their wife to convert to Islam. Essabar's parents tried unsuccessfully to turn him away from radicalization.

After being radicalized in 1999, Essabar trained in Afghanistan where he learned combat skills and passport alteration. He returned to the training camps in early 2000 and returned to Germany in August 2000. According to the 9/11 Commission report, it is possible that Essabar was initially intended to replace Ramzi bin al-Shibh as a hijacker after bin al-Shibh failed to get a United States visa. After bin al-Shibh's fourth attempt to get a U.S. Visa was declined in late 2000, Essabar made two unsuccessful U.S.visa applications, stating that he wished to visit the United States in February 2001.

On 30 August 2001, Essabar left Hamburg for Afghanistan via Karachi, Pakistan. Ramzi bin al-Shibh later said that Essabar delivered the cryptic message to Khalid Sheikh Mohammed, indicating the date that the September 11 attacks would be carried out, although bin al-Shibh's claim is in doubt. Essabar may not have known the significance of the date, but he did relay the message. The truth of bin al-Shibh's claims is in doubt, due to "inconsistent statements". Khalid Sheikh Mohammed insists that he learned of the date of the attacks in a letter delivered by Essabar.

Upon arriving in Afghanistan, Essabar disappeared, presumably re-joining remnants of Al-Qaeda in Afghanistan. After the September 11th attacks, he became subject to a German arrest warrant. In 2002 he was added to the United Nations Security Council sanctions list. According to al-Qaeda, Essabar became a prominent Al-Qaeda field commander in charge of foreign fighters operating in the Waziristan region of Pakistan. He was associated with Abu al-Layth al-Libi group of fighters. According to a 2008 publication by Al-Qaeda, Essabar was killed in Afghanistan in mid-2003 when fighting American soldiers in the Shinkay District. However, in 2011 the European Union added Essabar to the sanctions list, which would imply that he was still alive. The fate of Essabar has never been independently confirmed.

== See also ==
- Planning of the September 11 attacks
