= Richard Zuley =

American intelligence official and torture expert

- Born: Richard Patrick Zuley; October 3, 1946 (age 79)
- Occupation: Homicide detective
- Known for: Identified as the official in charge of the interrogation of Guantanamo captive Mohammedou Ould Slahi

Richard Patrick Zuley (born October 3, 1946) is a former homicide detective in the United States who had a 37-year career in the Chicago Police Department. He is most known for obtaining confessions from suspects by torture. Since the early 2000s, some of these convictions have been investigated and overturned as wrongful, following allegations that he had tortured and/or framed suspects. Since 2013 he has been the subject of several civil suits from inmates claiming abuse and frame-ups to gain convictions.

Zuley also served as an officer in the United States Navy Reserve. In 2014 it was reported that he was called into service and assigned to the Guantánamo Bay detention camp in 2003, where as a lieutenant he led the interrogation of Mohamedou Ould Slahi, classified as a high-profile detainee. Slahi was one of a small number of Guantanamo prisoners for whom the U. S. Secretary of Defense authorized the use of so-called extended interrogation techniques in this period. Legal scholars and human rights critics have since characterized these methods as torture. In January 2015, Slahi published his memoir, Guantanamo Diary, which detailed his torture. He has since been released being innocent of all alleged crimes and posing no threat to the United States. The Guardian said in 2015 that Zuley had applied practices to American suspects in Chicago that he later used against Slahi at Guantanamo. Slahi's book is now a major motion picture starring Jodie Foster called, "The Mauritanian." Zuley's character is called Captain Collins, Zuley's pseudonym at Guantanamo.

== Police career ==
Zuley served for 37 years as an officer in the Chicago Police Department, 25 of those years as a detective. He served mostly on Chicago's North Side. (Reporter Spencer Ackerman gives his dates of service as 1977–2007.) During his last 18 months of service, Zuley was an instructor at the department's training academy, where he helped found a highly regarded counter-terrorism training division.

Zuley was wounded on June 6, 1980, when he came across a robbery in progress and tried to apprehend four burglars. On January 30, 1990, the Chicago Tribune covered Zuley's investigation of the murder of a young Asian refugee.

Since the 1990s, the Police Department, city of Chicago and Cook County have been dealing with multiple investigations of officers accused of having tortured suspects to gain confessions. In some cases, where convictions relied on such confessions, they have been overturned and inmates have been freed. After Zuley retired, there were multiple inquiries into overturned convictions that had relied on confessions he coerced or evidence he planted. Under Cook County State's Attorney Anita Alvarez, the Conviction Integrity Unit in 2015 planned to subpoena Zuley's entire complaint history. Among these cases was that of Lathierial Boyd, who was exonerated as innocent and freed in 2013 based on wrongful conviction, after serving 23 years in prison.

Upon his retirement Zuley accepted a position as an emergency manager at the Chicago Department of Public Health.

== Torture investigations ==
In the late 1990s and early 2000s, the issue of torture in the Chicago Police Department, particularly under the supervision of Area 2 commander Jon Burge, resulted in investigations and the establishment of the Illinois Torture Inquiry Relief Commission. It was originally authorized to screen incidents related to Burge and his cohort, but more than 130 people claimed incidents of torture by other officers and claimed that they had been convicted on the basis of coerced confessions. In 2015 the City of Chicago established a $5.5 million reparations fund for victims of police torture and their families. In addition to making direct payments, it provides for psychological counseling for victims and their families, free classes at the city college for children and grandchildren, and other services.

Zuley has also become the subject of investigations into his use of torture. Multiple civil suits have been filed against him from inmates who claim he framed them, or beat confessions from them. One of his subjects, Lathierial Boyd, was freed in 2013 after Cook County State's Attorney Anita Alvarez reviewed his case when new evidence was introduced; her office dropped all charges against him and said he should never have been prosecuted. Boyd served 23 years in prison on a wrongful conviction for murder due to evidence by Zuley. Boyd filed a civil suit for damages against Zuley, claiming that the former detective had framed him for a 1990 killing outside the Exodus nightclub. He received compensation from the state.

Other suits and requests for reviews of convictions have been filed by:

- Anthony Garrett, who was sentenced to 100 years in prison in the murder of a seven-year-old boy, alleges that Zuley beat a confession from him. Others allege that he kept them shackled in stress positions, used other physical torture, and threatened their families.
- Griggs
- Lee Harris
- Benita Johnson

The Indiana Daily Student reported The Guardian revelations, writing that Zuley had run a covert interrogation site at the Homan Square facility while in the Chicago Police Department that has been likened to the CIA covert black site interrogation sites.

== Guantanamo service ==
In late 2002 Zuley was called into service in the Naval Reserve to serve as an interrogator at the Guantanamo detainee camp established by President George W. Bush. In 2003 he took over the interrogation of Mohamedou Ould Slahi (Mohamedou Ould Salahi). Salahi was one of a small number of high-profile Guantanamo captives for whom the Secretary of Defense authorized the use of so-called extended interrogation techniques; legal scholars and human rights critics have since characterized these methods as torture.

On February 18, 2015, Spencer Ackerman, reporting in a two-part series in The Guardian, covered Zuley's alleged involvement in the torture and forced confessions of several homicide suspects in Chicago. The cases were receiving renewed attention as inmates worked to overturn convictions. Later in 2015 the City of Chicago set up a $5.5 million reparations fund for victims of police torture. Ackerman revealed additional details of Zuley's part in the interrogation and torture of Guantanamo prisoner Mohamedou Ould Slahi, whose memoir Guantanamo Diary had just been published in January. The Guardian characterized Zuley's use of torture as "brutal and ineffective."

Slahi's memoir described physical torture and psychological techniques. These included being "force-fed seawater, sexually molested, subjected to a mock execution and repeatedly beaten, kicked and smashed across the face, all spiced with threats that his mother will be brought to Guantánamo and gang-raped." It was widely read and discussed, becoming an international bestseller.

Ackerman based his account in part on the Senate Intelligence Committee report on CIA torture, which had quoted from Zuley's memos at Guantanamo. Zuley described using "stress positions"—the shackling of interrogation subjects in painful postures for extended periods of time. The Senate report also described Zuley threatening to harm Slahi's family members. Slahi's 2004 testimony before his Combatant Status Review Tribunal, and his 2015 memoir, describe Zuley threatening to bring Slahi's mother to Guantanamo, where the interrogator said she would be raped. During his 2004 CSR Tribunal, Slahi testified that Zuley described a dream where he saw Slahi's corpse being buried.

Reportedly Zuley wanted to blindfold Slahi, load him on a plane, take him on a long flight circling Guantanamo, but tell him, when he landed, that he was in an Arab country allied to the US, where even more brutal torture was routine. But funds were not made available to charter a plane, so Zuley arranged to blindfold the prisoner and take him on a boat, threatening to drown him.
