= Robert L. Swann (military lawyer) =

American lawyer

Robert L. Swann is an American lawyer and retired career Army colonel. He was the second Chief Prosecutor of the Military Commission at Guantanamo Bay detention camp, serving 2004 to 2006. He followed Fred Borch, who resigned in disgrace, and William Lietzau, acting Chief Prosecutor.

After active duty officer Morris Davis became Chief Prosecutor, Swann remained on the prosecution team. In 2008 he was the lead prosecutor for the Department of Defense in military commission cases of Khalid Sheik Muhammed and Mustafa Ahmed al-Hawsawi. These were put on hold pending 2009 amendments to the Military Commissions Act. The charges were dropped in 2009 when the administration intended to transfer the cases to federal court. Swann intended to try to be appointed to prosecute when the cases were transferred to the civilian justice system. Following the refusal of Congress to go along with a federal trial in New York, the government in 2012 began prosecution of military commissions again.

== Guantanamo military commissions ==
Swann was appointed as the second Chief Prosecutor of the Guantanamo military commissions, replacing Fred Borch in 2004.

=== Internal criticisms of Borch ===
Australian newspapers broke the story in the summer of 2005, that three military lawyers on the prosecution team had criticised Borch's conduct of the prosecution, saying that he was not ensuring due process to defendants. The three prosecutors whose memos were leaked were: Robert Preston, John Carr, and Carrie Wolf. Their memos, written in 2003, were leaked in 2005. Those memos stated:

- That Borch had assured the prosecution team that the officers sitting in judgment on the commission would be handpicked to be sure to convict, so prosecutors didn't have to worry about doing a good job.
- That Borch had assured the prosecution team that any exculpatory evidence in favor of the suspects would be classified, so it wouldn't be made available to the suspect, or his defense team.

Preston, Carr and Wolf were all reassigned, as they requested. All three were subsequently promoted.

After the memos were written, the Department of Defense investigated, and said the allegations were unfounded. Although Borch denied their allegations, he resigned his commission in April 2004.

The Department of Defense revised the structure of the Military commission, changes which Swann supported the revisions. In addition, Swann and the new Presiding Officer recommended removal of two other original Commission panel members.

After the memos were leaked in 2005, there was renewed attention to the military commission, but Defense stated that it had already made substantive changes and replaced the top personnel.

== Prosecutor complaints about Swann ==
On March 31, 2007 The Wall Street Journal published a long article about Stuart Couch, a military prosecutor who had worked under Swann. According to The Wall Street Journal, Couch considered requesting reassignment from the prosecution team, but ultimately requested reassignment from the prosecution of Mohamedou Ould Slahi. While Couch believed that Slahi was guilty, he had come to believe that the confessions and other evidence against Slahi were too tainted by having been obtained by abusive interrogation techniques for them to be admissible as evidence in court. Couch thought that the interrogation techniques had violated the Uniform Code of Military Justice, the United States' own laws, and International treaties to which the United States was a signatory.

Couch and Swann reportedly had a loud and acrimonious confrontation over his decision. The WSG reported that when Swann learned of Couch's moral reservations, he demanded:

What makes you think you're so much better than the rest of us around here?" Further, "An impassioned debate followed, the prosecutor recalls. Col. Swann said the Torture Convention didn't apply to military commissions. Col. Couch asked his superior to cite legal precedent that would allow the president to disregard a treaty.

In 2008 Swann was appointed as the lead prosecutor in what were to be military commission trials of Sheikh Khalid Mohammed and Mustafa Ahmed al-Hawsawi.
