= Guantanamo Diary =

Guantanamo Diary may refer to:

- Guantanamo Diary (memoir)
- Guantanamo Diary (film)
