= The Sixties (disambiguation) =

The Sixties, shortened from "the 1960s", was a recent decade. It may also refer to:

- The Sixties: Years of Hope, Days of Rage, 1987 book by Todd Gitlin
- The Sixties (miniseries), 2014 documentary miniseries by CNN
- The '60s, a 1999 miniseries directed by Mark Piznarski
