= Lathierial Boyd =

African-American man from Chicago

- Occupation: Realtor
- Known for: Wrongfully convicted and imprisoned for 23 years

Lathierial Boyd is an African-American man from Chicago who was wrongfully convicted of murder in 1990 and served 23 years in prison. His appeals were turned down. An investigation by WGN-TV television in 2001 helped document new evidence in his case.

A review by the Cook County State's Attorney office in 2012-13 found that the police work on his case was flawed. His conviction was overturned; Boyd was fully exonerated and freed in September 2013.

In 2013 Boyd sued the city of Chicago and various named officials including the detectives that worked his case. Although his suit was dismissed in a summary judgement issued by federal judge Robert Gettleman he did receive $213,624 in compensation from the State of Illinois.

== Background and case ==
Lathierial Boyd was born and grew up in Chicago. He later admitted to having sold drugs when he was young, but put his life in order, becoming a successful realtor. At age 24, he had a loft in Chicago.

In March 1990, learning that the police were looking for him, the 24-year-old Boyd went to a police station and agreed to be in a line-up. His name had come up when police talked with Ricky Warner, the severely wounded survivor of a February shooting at the Exodus club in Wrigleyville. Warner did not see the fatal shooting of Michael Fleming, as both men were both shot in the back. They were outside the Exodus club and apparently involved in a drug deal.

Boyd did not match the eyewitness descriptions from the murder. He was fifty pounds heavier and several inches taller than the witness description. He lacked the facial hair which eyewitnesses described of the suspect, and had different skin tone.

He also had an alibi, as he was staying that night 20 miles away from the scene of the shooting, at the home of his sister and brother-in-law. His brother-in-law, a deputy sheriff in Cook County, described having seen Boyd sleeping when he went to the bathroom at 1:30 am, shortly before the murder. No eyewitnesses to the shooting, of which there were several, identified Boyd as the shooter in a lineup. "There was no physical or forensic evidence tying Boyd to the crime scene, and none of the more than a dozen witnesses to the shooting identified Boyd." But once the police arrested Boyd, based on other identification by Warner and his father, they stopped looking at other suspects.

Boyd gave the police permission to search his loft, and Richard Zuley, a white homicide detective, left him shackled to a wall in the precinct station for several hours while he was gone. When he returned, according to Boyd, Zuley said, "“No nigger is supposed to live like this." Later Zuley cobbled together a case that was prosecuted, in part by Zuley's suppressing exculpatory evidence, such as Boyd not matching descriptions of several eyewitnesses of the shooter.

Boyd had a public defender. He agreed to a bench trial in October 1990 and was convicted by the judge, based on what the prosecution presented as eyewitness identification by Warner. Boyd's defense failed to make the case for him, to show that Warner could not have seen the shooter, to present his alibi, and other errors.

Boyd was sentenced to 82 years in prison, with no hope for release until serving half of his sentence. He appealed his conviction but was unsuccessful. The Illinois Supreme Court declined to hear his case in 2000.

By 2001, the television station WGNTV in Chicago had learned about Boyd's case and began its own investigation, including interviews of seven of the nine eyewitnesses. With the aid of material and petitions gathered by WGN, on February 6, 2008, Boyd filed "a petition for executive clemency with the Illinois Prisoner Review Board. The petition is based on the argument that the evidence supports the pardoning of Boyd based on his actual innocence of the Exodus shootings.

== 2013 Exoneration and freedom ==
Anita Alvarez, Cook County State's Attorney, determined Boyd was innocent. Her Conviction Integrity Unit conducted a routine review of his case history beginning in 2011 after new evidence about the eyewitnesses was introduced by Boyd's new attorney Kathleen Zellner. They said he should never have been prosecuted. He received his certificate of innocence on September 25, 2013. Boyd's conviction due to Zuley's questionable means for assembling evidence lead Alvarez to subpoena the entire history of complaints against Zuley.

In October 2013 Boyd "sued Chicago, six named police officers and several unknown individuals in the Eastern Division of the Northern District of Illinois." After depositions were taken from all the parties, and following multiple motions, Federal Judge Robert Gettleman dismissed Boyd's suit in a summary judgement. In his 33-page opinion issued on December 6, 2016, Judge Gettleman stated "he (Boyd) failed to provide even a scintilla of evidence to support Boyd's claim." Boyd v. City Of Chicago et al, No. 1:2013cv07152 - Document 140 (N.D. Ill. 2016) In his finding, Judge Gettleman also noted that in his own deposition, Boyd had refuted claims he made against the police, pointing out that although Boyd claimed evidence in the form of a hand-written note, it had been manufactured and planted, as he admitted in his deposition that he had written the evidence in question and had provided similar notes to other drug dealers who worked for him. Judge Gettleman gives a thorough and comprehensive response to each of the counts in Boyd's claim and finds that the "Plaintiff's argument provides no reason to believe, and certainly no evidence, that the defendant officers collaborated in a broad and complex scheme to frame him for the February 24, 1990, shooting. Consequently, no jury could reasonable find in favor of plaintiff and his claims fail."https://law.justia.com/cases/federal/district-courts/illinois/ilndce/1:2013cv07152/288516/140/

As a result of his failed lawsuit against the City of Chicago and the named police officers, Boyd was eligible to be billed by the City of Chicago for legal costs. He did however receive $213,624 in compensation from the state of Illinois and unrelated to his lawsuit."

Boyd's case became more widely known in early 2015, when Zuley became the subject of international attention. The Guardian reported that he had served at Guantanamo Bay detention camp as a lieutenant in the US Navy Reserve, beginning in 2003. He was called into service to interrogate Mohamedou Ould Slahi, classified as a high-profile detainee. In January 2015, Slahi published his memoir, Guantanamo Diary in January 2015, which became an international bestseller. It included detailed descriptions of the various tortures he suffered, including psychological.

Zuley used the various extended interrogation techniques authorized by the Secretary of Defense for Slahi and some other detainees. These methods have since been characterized as torture. The Guardian noted that numerous complaints in Chicago against Zuley were related to his use of torture during interrogation.

Zuley was among several detectives, including Jon Burge, who were investigated in the late 1990s and into the 21st century because of alleged abuse of suspects. The 1990 Goldston Report by the Chicago Office of Professional Standards and an independent investigation concluded in 2006, determined that Burge and his men had committed torture in numerous instances and that there were some convictions based only on confessions coerced by them.
