= Fred Borch =

American lawyer

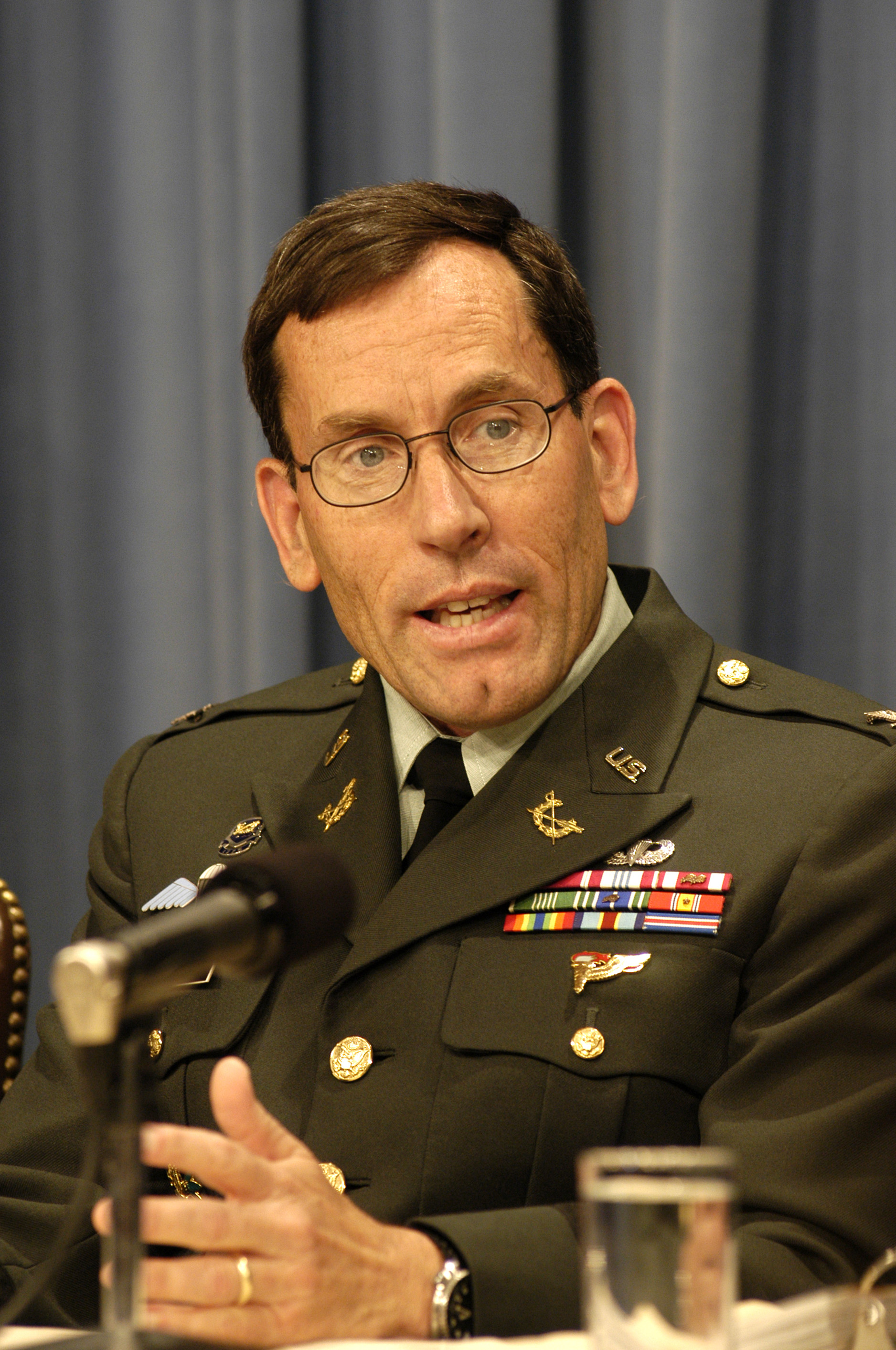
Frederic Borch

Colonel Frederic L. Borch (born 1954) is a former career United States Army attorney with a master's degree in national security studies, who served as chief prosecutor of the Guantanamo military commissions. He resigned his commission in August 2005 after three prosecutors complained that he had rigged the system against providing due process to defendants. He was replaced by Robert L. Swann

He worked for a time as a civilian consultant for the prosecution teams of the Guantanamo military commissions. In 2006 he was hired for the position of the first Regimental Historian and Archivist for the United States Army's Judge Advocate General Corps. He was awarded a Fulbright fellowship for 2012–2013 to serve as a visiting professor at the University of Leiden, teaching issues in terrorism and counter-terrorism.

He continued to serve as the Regimental Historian and Archivist while also taking on the mantle of Professor of Legal History and Leadership until his retirement from Federal civilian service in 2023. When he retired, he had completed ten books about Judge Advocates throughout history and is continuing to work on publishing more volumes. He has also published over 200 legal and historical articles.

== Education ==
Borch earned a B.A. in history from Davidson College in 1976, and was commissioned into the U.S. Army. He studied law at the University of North Carolina for his J.D. degree, then at the University of Brussels for an LL.M. in international and comparative law (magna cum laude). He has also received an LL.M from the Judge Advocate General's School; and M.A. from the Naval War College; an M.A. from the University of Virginia; and an M.A. from Norwich University.

== Military career ==
A legal assistant to Fort Benning's Army Infantry School and the 325th Infantry Regiment, Borch spent two years as a defense counsel at the Army's Trial Defense Service in Kaiserslautern, Germany.

In 1987, Borch enrolled for a year at the Judge Advocate General's school in Charlottesville, Virginia and received his degree in Military Law. He was assigned to Fort Bragg's XVIII Airborne Corps, while also serving as a civilian assistant District Attorney for North Carolina

In 1990, Borch began a 3-year term as professor of Criminal Law at the JAG school, specializing in Fourth Amendment application. Following this position, he studied at the Command and General Staff College at Fort Leavenworth. He was next assigned to a job with the Joint Service Committee for Military Justice, between the JAG office and the Pentagon. He drafted legislation related to the Uniform Code of Military Justice and proposed changes to the Manual for Courts-Martial.

Borch oversaw the successful 1997 prosecution of 13 drill sergeants accused of sexual misconduct at Aberdeen Proving Ground, and was promoted to Deputy Chief in the Army's Government Appellate Division. The following year, he was made Staff Judge Advocate for Fort Gordon's Army Signal Center.

He attended the Naval War College in Newport, Rhode Island and graduated at the top of his class, receiving his Master's degree in National Security Studies in 2001. He took a position as a professor of International Law, focusing on counter-terrorism.

== Guantanamo Bay military commission ==
Responding to the United States Supreme Court decision in Rasul v. Bush (2004) that detainees had the right to challenge their detention before an impartial tribunal, the Department of Defense set up a system of Combatant Status Review Tribunals, Administrative Review Boards, and Military Commissions, the last to try defendants charged with war crimes.

Borch was appointed as Chief Prosecutor of the Military Commission in 2004. He worked to prepare for trials starting in 2005.

== Alleged corruption of the Guantanamo hearings ==
On June 15, 2005 Lieutenant Commander Charles Swift testified before the Senate Judiciary Committee that:

...regarding my decision to file a next friend habeas petition on behalf of Mr. Hamdan... when the Chief Prosecutor for commissions requested assignment of counsel to Mr. Hamdan, he specified that access to Mr. Hamdan was contingent upon negotiating a guilty plea on Mr. Hamdan's behalf."

In August 2005 the prosecutors Capt. John Carr, Maj. Robert Preston wrote that Borch told them that the presiding officers had been chosen because they would be sure to convict. He reportedly said that all evidence that suggested that the suspects were innocent would be given a "secret" security classification, which would exclude it from the defense teams' review or knowledge.

Borch denounced the two men's statements, claiming they were "monstrous lies", but resigned his commission

Following Borch's replacement both Peter Brownback, the commission's president, and Swann, the replacement for Chief Prosecutor, recommended the removal of the other two members of the commission, Air Force Lieutenant Colonel Timothy K. Toomey and Army Lieutenant Colonel Curt S. Cooper. Toomey was an intelligence officer who had helped capture suspects in Afghanistan. Cooper had admitted to referring to Guantanamo prisoners indiscriminately as "terrorists."

== Later life ==
After retirement from the military, Borch worked for the Guantanamo prosecution teams as a civilian consultant.

In addition, he has been serving as President of the Orders and Medals Society of America since 2010 and he is an active contributor to its journal. Borch published a book on military decorations of the U.S. Army and Air Force in 2013. In 2006, Borch was hired for the position of the first Regimental Historian and Archivist for the JAG Corps.

In 2009, Borch was hired by The American Film Company as an adviser for the production of The Conspirator (2010). Directed by Robert Redford, the movie is about the military commission that in 1865 tried Mary Surratt and the other conspirators in the Lincoln assassination. The film stars James McAvoy and Robin Wright.

Borch was awarded a Fulbright fellowship for 2012–2013, as a visiting professor at the University of Leiden in the Netherlands. He will teach international law relating to terrorism and counter-terrorism.

In 2017, Borch started funding an essay prize for the Cromwell Association.

== Military works ==
The Department of Defense published several books by him:

- 2001, Judge Advocates in Combat: Army Lawyers in Military Operations from Vietnam to Haiti
- 2002, The Silver Star: A History of America’s Third Highest Award for Valor
- 2003, Judge Advocates in Vietnam, a History of Army Lawyers in Southeast Asia from 1959 to 1975
- 2005, Kimmel, Short and Pearl Harbor: The Final Report Revealed
- 2009, Sea Service Medals: Military Awards and Decorations of the Navy, Marine Corps, and Coast Guard (with Charles P. McDowell)
- 2010, For Military Merit: Recipients of the Purple Heart
- 2010, Geneva Conventions
- 2013, Medals for Soldiers and Airmen: Awards and Decorations of the United States Army and Air Force
- 2017, Military Trials of War Criminals in the Netherlands East Indies 1946 to 1949
- 2018, Lore of the Corps 2010 to 2017
- 2021, Judge Advocates in the Great War 1917 to 1922

== See also ==
- Robert Preston
- John Carr
- Carrie Wolf
- Moe Davis
- Stuart Couch
- Darrel Vandeveld
