= Robert Swann =

Robert Swann may refer to:

- Robert L. Swann (comptroller of Maryland) (born 1935), comptroller of the State of Maryland in the United States
- Robert L. Swann (military lawyer), American lawyer, and colonel in the United States Armed Services
- Robert Swann (land trust pioneer) (1918–2003), founder of the E. F. Schumacher Society
- Robert Swann (actor) (1945–2006), British actor
- Robin Swann (born 1971), Northern Irish politician

== See also ==
- Robert Swan (born 1956), Antarctic explorer
- Robert Swan (alpine skier) (born 1943), Canadian former alpine skier
- Robert Swan (actor) (1944–2023), American actor
