= Nancy Hollander =

American lawyer

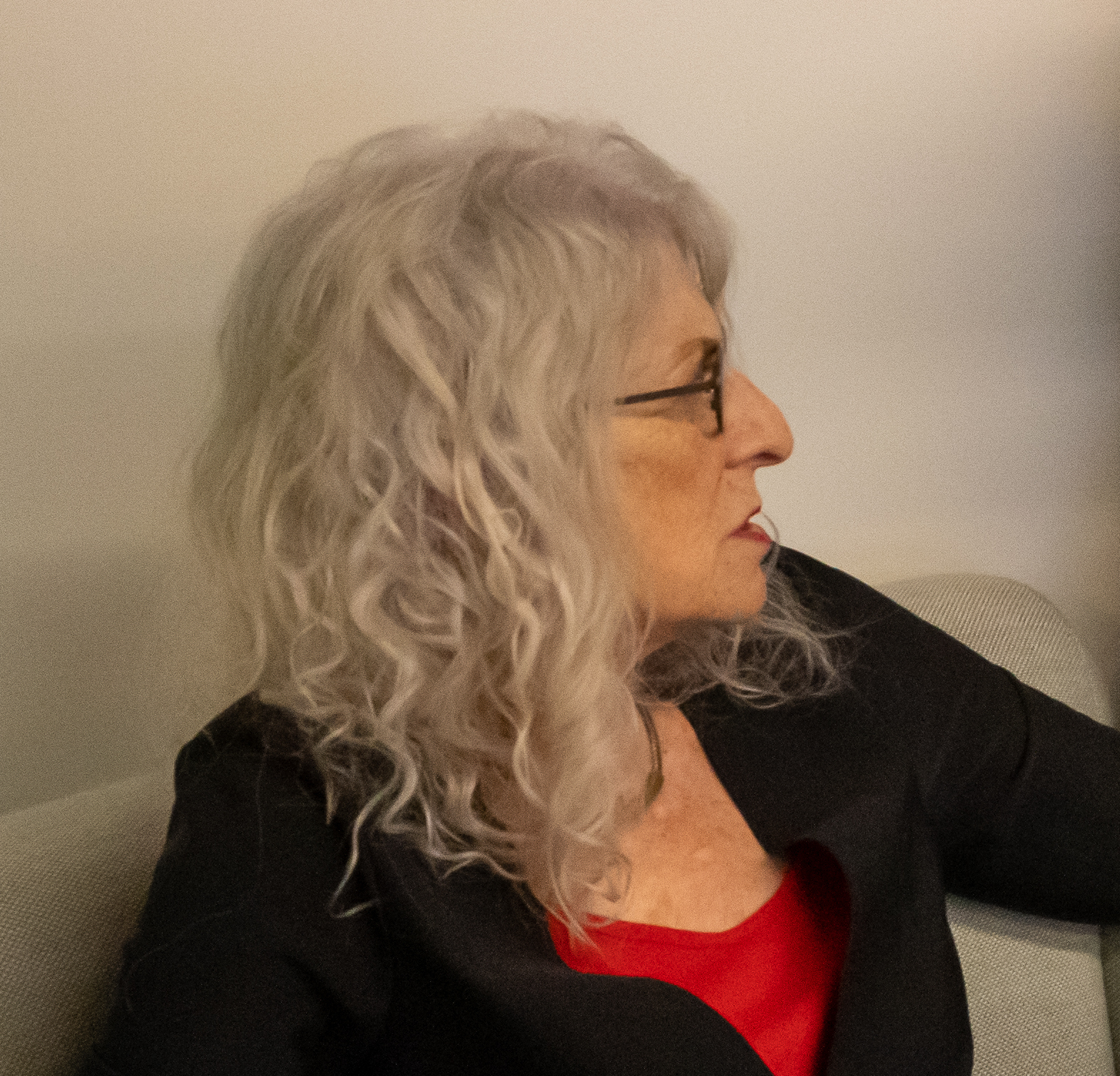
- Hollander at the Committee to Protect Journalists in 2022
- Born: 1944 (age 80–81)
- Education: University of Michigan (BA); University of New Mexico (JD)
- Occupation: Criminal defense lawyer
- Known for: Representing Chelsea Manning, Mohamedou Ould Slahi, and Abd al-Rahim al-Nashiri
- Spouse: Todd Gitlin (divorced)

Nancy Hollander (born 1944) is an American criminal defense lawyer best known for representing two Guantanamo Bay detainees, as well as Chelsea Manning. She was portrayed by actress Jodie Foster in the 2021 film The Mauritanian, about the case of her client Mohamedou Ould Slahi.

== Early life and education ==
Hollander was raised in Dallas, Texas. She received a Bachelor of Arts from the University of Michigan and a Juris Doctor from the University of New Mexico School of Law. As a student, Hollander was arrested three times while protesting as a member of Students for a Democratic Society.

== Career ==
Hollander represented Slahi until 2016, when he was released from the Guantanamo Bay detention camp. The film The Mauritanian is based on the story of Slahi's capture, torture, and detention, and Hollander's fight to win his release.

Hollander also represents Abd al-Rahim al-Nashiri, the alleged mastermind of the USS Cole bombing, who was tortured at CIA black sites and has been at Guantanamo Bay since 2006. Hollander won two judgments for al-Nashiri from the European Court of Human Rights, resulting in damages to al-Nashiri.

Hollander was lead counsel for Chelsea Manning's unsuccessful military appeal, but filed a successful application for commutation of Manning's sentence in 2017.

Hollander has been a partner at Freedman Boyd Hollander Goldberg Urias & Ward, P.A., in Albuquerque, New Mexico, since 1983.

== Personal life ==
Hollander was married to Todd Gitlin, an activist and academic associated with the New Left movement. With him, she co-wrote Uptown: Poor Whites in Chicago.
