= Moe Davis =

American politician (born 1958)

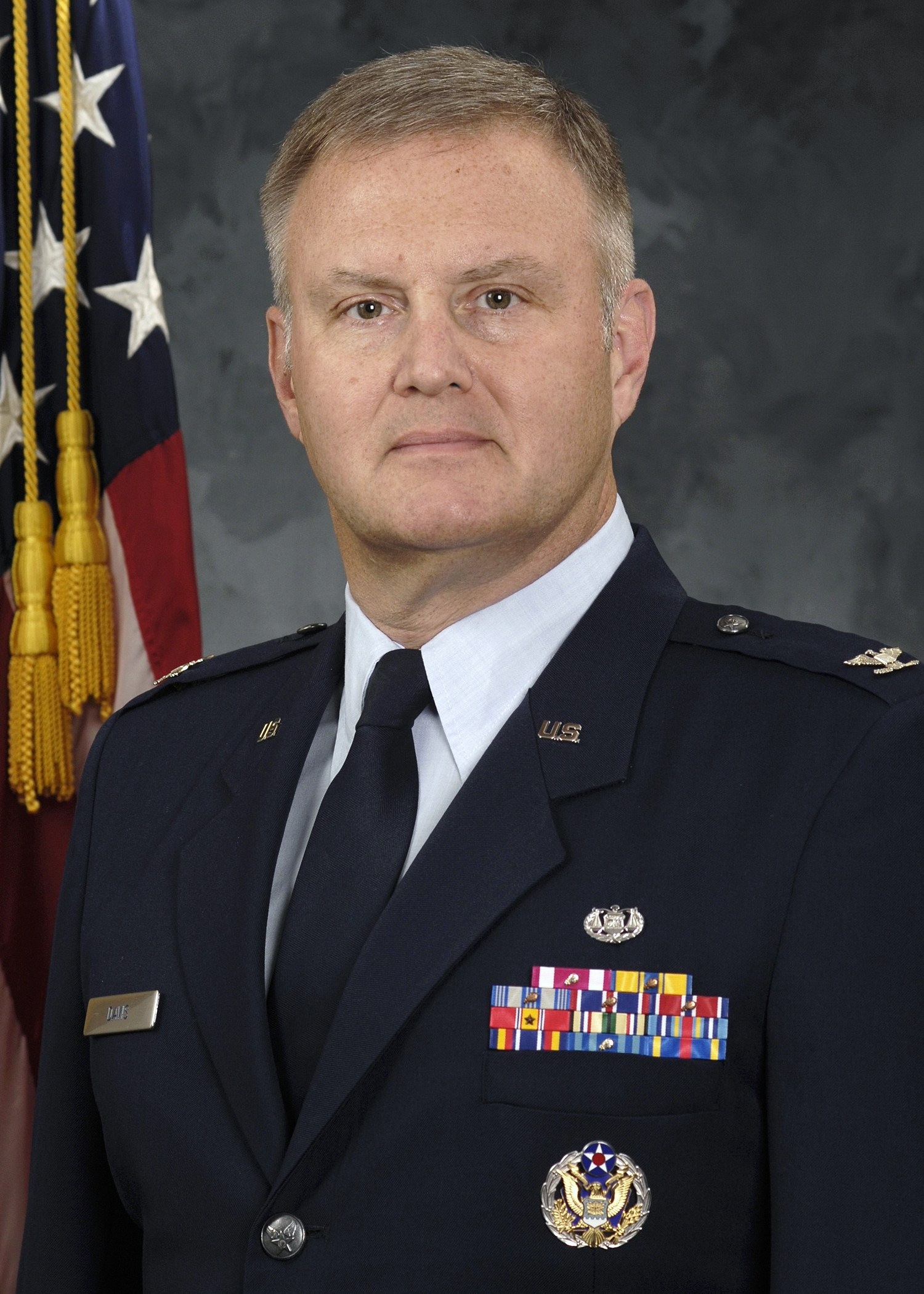

Personal details
- Born: Morris Durham Davis; July 31, 1958 (age 68) Shelby, North Carolina, U.S.
- Party: Democratic
- Education: Appalachian State University (BS); North Carolina Central University (JD); University of Virginia (LLM); George Washington University (LLM)
- Website: Official website

Military service
- Allegiance: United States
- Branch/service: United States Air Force
- Years of service: 1983–2008
- Rank: Colonel
- Unit: JAG Corps
- Battles/wars: Operation Southern Watch
- Awards: Legion of Merit; Meritorious Service Medal (6); Air Force Commendation Medal; Air Force Achievement Medal; Southwest Asia Service Medal; Global War on Terrorism Expeditionary Medal; Global War on Terrorism Service Medal

Morris Durham "Moe" Davis (born July 31, 1958) is an American retired U.S. Air Force colonel, attorney, educator, politician, and former administrative law judge.

Davis was appointed the third Chief Prosecutor of the Guantanamo military commissions, where he served from September 2005 until October 2007. He also served as director of the Air Force Judiciary. He resigned from the position after he refused to use evidence obtained through torture and because of political influence and pressure in prosecutions. He retired from active duty in October 2008.

In 2019, he officially announced his candidacy to replace U.S. Congressman Mark Meadows, in the United States House of Representatives after Meadows resigned to serve as White House Chief of Staff. On March 3, 2020, Davis won the Democratic primary for North Carolina's 11th congressional district with 52,665 votes. He lost to Madison Cawthorn in his election bid to the House of Representatives in the 2020 general election.

== Early life and education ==
Davis was born and raised in Shelby, North Carolina. He studied criminal justice at Appalachian State in the nearby town of Boone, and graduated with a Bachelor of Science in 1980. He received a J.D. from North Carolina Central University School of Law in 1983 and joined the Air Force as a J.A.G. officer in the same year. In 1992, he earned LL.M. degrees in military law (with a concentration in government procurement law) from JAG School at the University of Virginia in Charlottesville, and in government procurement law from The National Law Center at George Washington University in Washington, D.C.

Davis and his wife, Lisa, who works for an animal rescue, live in Asheville, North Carolina.

== Career ==
Unlike his predecessors at Guantanamo, Fred Borch and Robert L. Swann, Davis has been a visible public figure. His statements have triggered controversy. Davis once said in an interview that he was asked to replace Borch at Guantanamo because of Borch's pushing of ethical bounds.

Canadian teenager Omar Khadr's lawyer, Muneer Ahmad of American University, accused Colonel Davis of ethical misconduct for referring to Khadr as a "terrorist" and a "murderer" during the January 10, 2006, press conference. Ahmad asked the Presiding Officer to sanction Colonel Davis for the comments, but the Presiding Officer found the comments were fair and balanced, given the repeated negative out of court statements Ahmad had made for months prior to the hearing. When asked why the prosecution had finally broken its silence, Davis said:

For a number of months we've sat on the sidelines. We've just kind of taken it. There comes a time when you don't take it anymore.

On February 28, 2006, Davis spoke out again regarding the commissions, saying:

Remember if you dragged Dracula out into the sunlight he melted? Well, that's kind of the way it is trying to drag a detainee into the courtroom.

Guantanamo defense attorney H. Candace Gorman countered in a Huffington Post op-ed that this was an odd statement from Davis since it was the military's fault that so few cases had come to trial before the military commissions. By early 2007, only David Hicks, an Australian citizen, was being tried, and all but one of the charges against him had been dropped before trial for lack of evidence.

In March 2007, Davis threatened Major Michael Mori, the military defense counsel assigned to Hicks' case with prosecution under the Uniform Code of Military Justice, claiming that Mori had acted improperly in criticizing the military commissions while in Australia gathering evidence for the defense. Mori responded angrily, "Are they trying to intimidate me?"

Col. Dwight Sullivan, the Chief Defense Counsel for the military commissions, said that Major Mori's behavior as defense counsel was "absolutely proper." He said that, "a military defense lawyer is supposed to provide the same level of representation as a civilian lawyer." He said that in pressing Mr. Hicks's case in Australia, "Major Mori is fulfilling his duty as an officer and as an attorney."

Davis, similar to his father, is in the highest disability rating at 60 percent.

=== "The Guantánamo I Know" ===
On June 26, 2007, an op-ed by Davis, entitled "The Guantanamo I know", was published in The New York Times. In it, Davis argued that the Guantánamo Bay detention center is humane, professional, and operating in compliance with international law.

=== Supreme court to hear challenges to the Military Commissions Act ===
Congress authorized the military commission system under the Military Commissions Act of 2006, to create an alternative to the existing federal and military system. It restricted detainees as enemy combatants and those whose review was pending, to the military commission process; it prohibited their use of federal courts. The government stayed pending writs of habeas corpus.

On June 29, 2007, the Supreme Court agreed to hear some outstanding claims of habeas corpus, opening up the possibility that they might overturn some or all of the Military Commissions Act.

Davis called the Supreme Court's intention to review the MCA "meddling":

This constant uncertainty and meddling certainly takes a toll on people, It would be nice to have some certainty for a change.

=== Resignation as Chief Prosecutor at Guantanamo Bay ===
In October 2007, Colonel Davis resigned from his position as Chief Prosecutor. He had made the policy that evidence obtained from the use of waterboarding, which he considered torture, would not be admissible as evidence in the military commissions. By this time, charges were being developed against high-value detainees, some of whom had been waterboarded in the custody of the CIA. Davis was overruled in his policy by his superiors, including William J. Haynes, II, the General Counsel for the Department of Defense.

Davis resigned in protest and transferred to become the Head of the Air Force Judiciary, stating, "The guy who said waterboarding is A-okay I was not going to take orders from. I quit." He also charged that there was meddling from the Pentagon in cases, and claimed this presented serious conflicts of interest.

Davis said he was denied an end-of-tour medal for his two years at Guantanamo because he resigned and later spoke out about problems in the Pentagon's Office of Military Commissions. Davis stated about the medal denial, "I tell the truth, and I get labeled as having served dishonorably. I'm very concerned about the chilling effect ... on the process". Since his resignation, Davis has frequently spoken out against the Commissions.

In 2008, Davis was called by the defense to testify in the military commission of Salim Ahmed Hamdan, Osama bin Laden's driver, where he repeated his accusations of political interference. He said Pentagon interest in the progress of trials of detainees greatly increased after September 2006, when high-value detainees were transferred from the CIA to Guantanamo.

=== Congressional Research Service ===
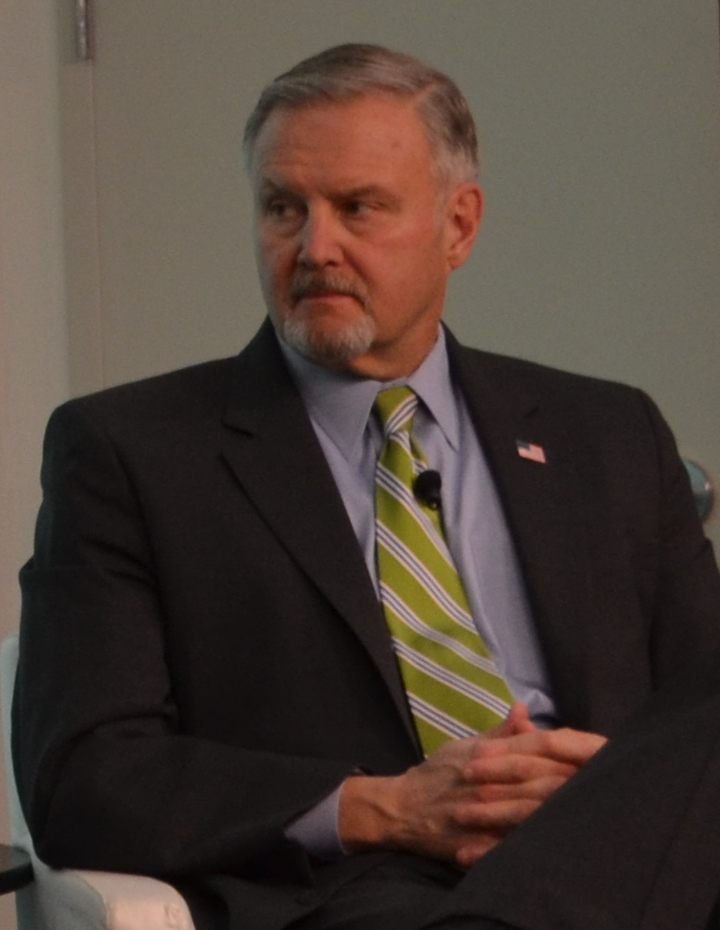
Davis in January 2015

Davis was named the head of the Foreign Affairs, Defense and Trade Division of the Congressional Research Service in December 2008; and was fired from this job in late November or early December 2009. His firing was thought prompted because of an op-ed Davis published in The Wall Street Journal that criticized a federal proposal to prosecute detainees in either military commissions or federal courts; he believed that one venue had to be consistently used. Davis wrote: "The administration must choose. Either federal courts or military commissions, but not both, for the detainees that deserve to be prosecuted and punished for their past conduct."

==== Davis v. Billington ====
In 2010, Davis sued the Library of Congress for wrongful termination under the Hatch Act in Davis v. Billington, claiming his First Amendment free speech rights were violated. The lawsuit was settled out of court and in 2016, Davis announced that his personnel file had been amended to remove language indicating that he had been separated "for cause" and that the Library of Congress had agreed to pay $100,000 in the settlement.

=== Crimes of War Education Project ===
Davis was Executive Director of the Crimes of War Education Project from 2010 to 2012. He was assistant professor at Howard University School of Law from 2011 to 2015, teaching legal reasoning, research and writing, oral advocacy and national security law.

=== Administrative law judge ===
Davis was an administrative law judge with the U.S. Department of Labor from 2015 to 2019, ruling on workers compensation cases involving issues from black lung disease to whistleblower cases, immigration visa appeals, child labor and other cases related to labor laws.

In the summer of 2019 Davis ruled that a Baltimore, Maryland–based subsidiary of Enterprise Rent-A-Car, Enterprise RAC Company of Baltimore, had violated United States labor law while contracting for the Federal government. In his decision he ordered the company to pay a $6.6 million fine and offer other restitution for discrimination against African Americans in its hiring, training, and promotion selections.

In an article on the lawsuit that preceded the Department of Labor ruling, The Baltimore Sun quoted an unnamed Enterprise company spokeswoman who contended that Enterprise had a "strong record of equal opportunity" in their hiring and employment practices and pointed to the company's recruitment outreach at HBCUs.

=== 2020 congressional campaign ===
On November 17, 2019, Davis announced his congressional bid for North Carolina's 11th congressional district held by Republican Mark Meadows. Davis says he initially ran for Congress because he did not see a Democratic challenger running at the time that would beat Meadows. However, once Meadows dropped out of the race, he continued running because "I figured I’ve got 30-plus years of defending democracy, and just to sit back now and watch it go down the drain just wasn’t palatable." Davis entered the Democratic primary along with Democrats Michael O'Shea, Gina Collias, Phillip Price, and Steve Woodsmall. Davis won the primary on March 3, 2020, with 47.35 percent of the vote. Collias was a distant second with 22.67 percent.

Davis lost the 2020 election to Madison Cawthorn, 54.5% to 42.4%.

North Carolina's 11th congressional district, 2020
Party	Candidate	Votes	%
Republican	Madison Cawthorn	245,351	54.5
Democratic	Moe Davis	190,609	42.4
Libertarian	Tracey DeBruhl	8,682	1.9
Green	Tamara Zwinak	5,503	1.2
Total votes		450,145	100.0
Republican hold			

==== Endorsements ====
Early endorsements for Davis came from progressive Democrats, legal scholars, and human rights activists. Chris Lu, former U.S. Deputy Secretary of Labor under the Obama Administration pledged support, as did Fletcher, North Carolina–based civil rights attorney Frank Goldsmith, Harvard Law School professor and Constitutional Law expert Laurence Tribe, and Eugene R. Fidell, the Florence Rogatz Visiting Lecturer in Law at Yale Law School. Davis was also endorsed by VoteVets.org, which represents 700,000 progressive veterans; the Sierra Club; Equality NC and the AFL-CIO Western North Carolina Central Labor Council.

==== Political positions ====
During his post-military career Davis has published numerous op-eds and other criticisms of the Guantanamo Military Commission process. On March 27, 2015, after Harvey Rishikof, the most recent convening authority for the Guantanamo military commissions was fired after less than a year on the job, Morris wrote:

Think about that for a moment. If a professional football team was on its seventh head coach and sixth quarterback in less than a dozen years, that team would almost certainly be a loser.

Davis tweeted a claim that he was blocked by Donald Trump on Twitter prior to Trump's 2016 candidacy.

Davis openly opposed Trump's actions during his presidency. He finds it appalling that Trump isolated the Kurds, and he believes that Trump was undermining all the hard work it took to build up US alliances.

Moe Davis attracted negative attention for his violence-encouraging statements, "When @NCGOP extremists go low, we stomp their scrawny pasty necks with our heels and once you hear the sound of a crisp snap you grind your heel hard and twist it slowly side to side for good measure." He would be quoted on Twitter on several occasions for such violent rhetoric.

Moe Davis accused his former opponent Congressman Madison Cawthorn of sedition under US law: "I was Chief Prosecutor at Guantanamo for over 2 years and there’s far more evidence of Congressman Madison Cawthorn’s guilt than there was of guilt for 95+ percent of the detainees. It's time we start a domestic war on sedition by American terrorists."

=== 2026 congressional campaign ===
On May 5, 2025, Davis told Smoky Mountain News that he would again run for Congress in North Carolina's 11th congressional district in 2026, challenging Republican incumbent Chuck Edwards. On August 22, Davis withdrew from the race.

== Military awards ==
Davis has received the following awards and recognition.

Ribbon	Description	Notes
Ribbon of the LOM	Legion of Merit	
	Meritorious Service Medal	Four oak leaf clusters
	Air Force Commendation Medal	Two oak leaf clusters
	Air Force Achievement Medal	One oak leaf cluster
Ribbon of the GWOT-EM	Global War on Terrorism Expeditionary Medal	
Ribbon of the GWOT-SM	Global War on Terrorism Service Medal	
Ribbon of the SASM	Southwest Asia Service Medal	

== See also ==
- Robert Preston
- John Carr
- Carrie Wolf
- Fred Borch
- Stuart Couch
- List of resignations from the Guantanamo military commission
- Waterboarding
- Mark Meadows
- Knight First Amendment Institute v. Trump
