= Thomas Hemingway =

American military lawyer

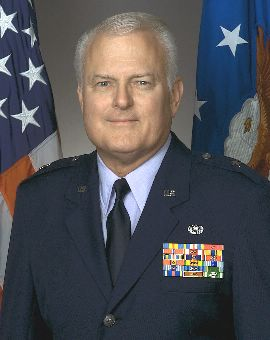
- Brigadier General Thomas Hemingway
- Military career
- Allegiance: United States of America
- Branch: United States Air Force
- Service years: 1962–1996; 2003-2007
- Rank: Brigadier general
- Units: Air Force Legal Services Center; DOD Office of Military Commissions
- Conflicts: Vietnam War
- Awards: Defense Distinguished Service Medal; Defense Superior Service Medal; Legion of Merit (2); Bronze Star (3)

Brigadier General Thomas Hemingway is an American military lawyer who has served as a legal advisor to the Office of Military Commissions. Thomas Hemingway was a distinguished graduate of the Air Force ROTC program, was commissioned as a second lieutenant in November 1962 after earning his undergraduate degree at Willamette University. Upon graduation, he took an educational delay and earned his doctor of jurisprudence in 1965 at Willamette University College of Law. Hemingway entered active service in November 1965. He has also been an associate professor of law at the United States Air Force Academy and a senior judge on the Air Force Court of Military Review. He is a current member of the state bar in Oregon and the District of Columbia, and has been admitted to practice before the U.S. Court of Federal Claims, the U.S. Court of Appeals for the Federal Circuit and the Supreme Court of the United States. He retired from active service in October 1996. General Hemingway was recalled to active service in August 2003 to fill the position as Legal Adviser to the Convening Authority in the Department of Defense Office of Military Commissions, Washington, D.C. General. He was replaced by Thomas W. Hartmann in July 2007.

Leaked memos, quoted in an article published by Australian newspaper The Age, revealed major concerns Major Robert Preston and Captain John Carr had about the procedure for trying suspected terrorists held in the Guantanamo Bay detainment camp.

== Assignments ==
- November 1965 – January 1969, chief of civil law, Davis-Monthan Air Force Base, Ariz.
- January 1969 – January 1970, chief of military justice and provincial liaison with the Thai government, Udon Royal Thai AFB, Thailand
- January 1970 – July 1971, chief of military justice, 15th Air Force, March AFB, Calif.
- July 1971 – July 1975, associate professor of law, U.S. Air Force Academy, Colorado Springs, Colo.
- July 1975 – July 1979, staff judge advocate, 62nd Military Airlift Wing, McChord AFB, Wash.
- July 1979 – June 1982, staff judge advocate, 435th Tactical Airlift Wing, Rhein-Main Air Base, West Germany
- June 1982 – October 1983, senior judge on the Air Force Court of Military Review, Headquarters U.S. Air Force, Washington, D.C.
- October 1983 – July 1985, chief of military justice, Office of the Judge Advocate General, Headquarters U.S. Air Force, Washington, D.C., and chairman of the Joint Service Committee on Military Justice and the DOD Military Justice Act of 1983 Advisory Commission
- July 1985 – June 1988, staff judge advocate, 17th Air Force, Sembach AB, West Germany
- June 1988 – May 1990, staff judge advocate, Headquarters U.S. Air Forces in Europe, Ramstein AB, Germany
- May 1990 – August 1991, director of the U.S. Air Force Judiciary and vice commander of the Air Force Legal Services Center, Washington, D.C.
- August 1991 – August 1996, chief counsel, U.S. Transportation Command, and staff judge advocate, Headquarters Air Mobility Command, Scott AFB, Ill.
- August 2003 – July 2007, legal adviser, Office of Military Commissions, Office of the General Counsel, Department of Defense, Washington D.C.

== Major awards and decorations ==
- Defense Distinguished Service Medal
- Defense Superior Service Medal
- Legion of Merit with oak leaf cluster
- Bronze Star
- Meritorious Service Medal with two oak leaf clusters
- Air Force Commendation Medal
- Federal Republic of Germany Military Achievement Medal

== Other achievements ==
- 1985 Justice Tom C. Clark Award for outstanding accomplishments in career service to the U.S. government, District of Columbia Chapter of the Federal Bar Association. He is the only officer in the military service to receive the award.
- 2002 Distinguished Alumni Citation for achievement in government service, Willamette University

== Effective dates of promotion ==
- Second lieutenant June 3, 1962
- First lieutenant June 3, 1965
- Captain January 27, 1967
- Major September 1, 1973
- Lieutenant lolonel February 1, 1979
- Colonel August 1, 1983
- Brigadier general May 1, 1992
