= Rory Haines and Sohrab Noshirvani =

American screenwriting duo

Rory Haines and Sohrab Noshirvani are a screenwriting and showrunner duo best known for their work in the TV series Informer, as well as writing the films The Mauritanian and Black Adam.

== Biography ==
Haines was born in Bradford, West Yorkshire, United Kingdom, and received his MFA from Columbia University in 2011. Noshirvani is originally from Iran and emigrated to the United States, and also graduated from Columbia University in 2012. The two met at Columbia University's film program.

In 2013, their script From Here to Albion, was named to the Black List and was purchased by Participant Media. They also co-wrote The State, which was purchased by Fox Media in 2016. They also sold Revenge at a Wedding to Justin Lin’s Perfect Storm, and their pilot script The Narrows was bought by Universal Cable Productions.

The two most recently created the BBC series Informer, and wrote the screenplays for The Mauritanian, and Black Adam.

== Awards ==
Between 2019 and 2021, the duo was nominated for three British Academy of Film and Television Arts awards for the screenplays of The Informer and The Mauritanian.

== Filmography ==
Film

- The Mauritanian (2021)
- Black Adam (2022)
- John Rambo (2027)

Television

Year	Title	Notes
2018	Informer	Also creators
