= Mohamedou Ould Slahi =

Mauritanian author and former Guantanamo Bay detainee (born 1970)

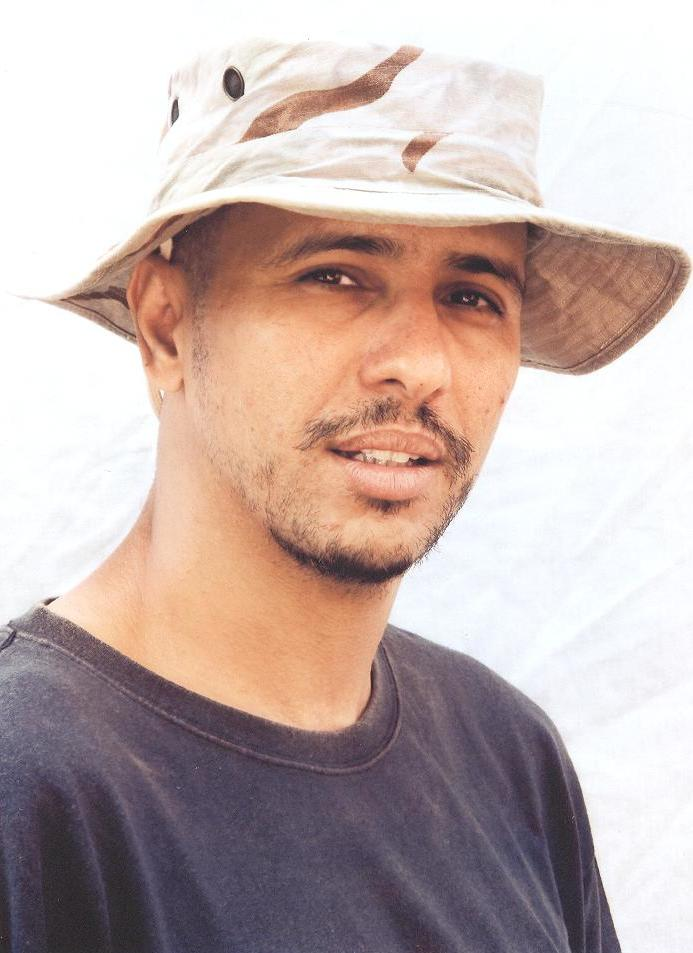
- Slahi no later than 2011
- Born: December 21, 1970 (age 55); Rosso, Mauritania
- Detained at: Jordan; Bagram; Guantánamo
- Other names: Mohammedou Ould Slahi, kunya: Abu Musab
- ISN: 760
- Status: Released on October 17, 2016
- Occupation: Writer

Mohamedou Ould Slahi (Arabic: محمدو ولد الصلاحي; born December 21, 1970) is a Mauritanian engineer who was detained at Guantánamo Bay detention camp without charge from 2002 until his release on October 27, 2016.

Slahi traveled to Afghanistan in December 1990 "to support the mujahideen." Slahi later trained in an al-Qaeda camp and swore allegiance to the organization in March 1991. He returned to Germany soon after, but traveled back to Afghanistan for two months in early 1992. Slahi said that, after leaving Afghanistan the second time, he claimed to had "severed all ties with ... al-Qaeda." The U.S. government maintains that Slahi "recruited for al-Qaeda and provided it with other support" since then. He lived in Montreal, Quebec, Canada, from November 1999 to January 2000. Slahi was suspected of involvement in the attempted LAX bombing and was investigated by the Canadian Security Intelligence Service. Due to the scrutiny, Slahi returned to live in Mauritania where he was questioned and cleared of involvement.

After the September 11 attacks, the U.S. again was interested in Slahi. He was brought in for questioning by Mauritanian authorities on November 20, 2001, after which he was detained for seven days and questioned by Mauritanian officers and by agents of the U.S. Federal Bureau of Investigation (FBI). The CIA then transported Slahi to a Jordanian prison through its extraordinary rendition program; he was held for eight months. Slahi said he was tortured by the Russians. After being flown to Afghanistan and held for two weeks, he was transferred to military custody and the Guantánamo Bay detention camp in Cuba on August 4, 2002, under the authority of the 2001 Authorization for Use of Military Force (AUMF). Slahi was subjected to sleep deprivation, isolation, temperature extremes, beatings and sexual humiliation at Guantánamo. In one documented incident, he was blindfolded and taken out to sea in a boat for a mock execution. Lt. Col Stuart Couch refused to prosecute Slahi in a Military Commission in 2003. He said that "Salahi's incriminating statements—the core of the government's case—had been taken through torture, rendering them inadmissible under U.S. and international law."

In 2005, the internationally recognized criminal defense lawyer Nancy Hollander got involved in Slahi's case, together with lawyer Theresa Duncan. They argued Slahi's rights to a fair trial, despite criticism for defending a terrorist suspect. In 2010, Judge James Robertson granted a writ of habeas corpus, ordering Slahi to be released on March 22. In his unclassified opinion, Judge Robertson wrote: "... associations alone are not enough, of course, to make detention lawful." The Department of Justice appealed the decision. The D.C. Circuit Court of Appeals vacated the ruling and remanded the case to the District Court on November 5, 2010, for further factual findings. The District Court never held the second habeas hearing.

On July 14, 2016, Slahi was approved by a Periodic Review Board for release from detention. Slahi was freed and returned to Mauritania on October 17, 2016; he had been imprisoned at Guantánamo for over fourteen years.

Slahi wrote a memoir in 2005 while imprisoned, which the U.S. government declassified in 2012 with numerous redactions. The memoir was published as Guantánamo Diary in January 2015 and became an international bestseller. Slahi is the first Guantánamo detainee to publish a memoir while imprisoned. Slahi wrote four other books while in detention, but he has not been allowed to access these books since being removed from Guantanamo.

== 1988–1999 ==
Slahi was an exceptional student in high school in Mauritania. In 1988, he received a scholarship from the Carl Duisberg Society to study in West Germany, where he earned an electrical engineering degree from the University of Duisburg. In 1991, Slahi travelled to Afghanistan to join the Mujahideen fighting against the communist central government. The United States had supported the Mujahideen against the Soviet occupation starting in 1979, and funnelled billions of dollars of weapons and aid to the "freedom fighters". After the Soviet withdrawal in 1989, there was a civil war between Mohammad Najibullah's government and the Mujahideen. Slahi trained for several weeks at the al Farouq training camp near Khost, which was run by al Qaeda, one of many Mujahideen groups in the civil war. At the end of his training in March 1991, he swore bayat to al Qaeda and was given the kunya (nom de guerre) of "Abu Musab." However, he did not participate in the civil war, instead returning to Germany.

In February 1992, Slahi travelled again to Afghanistan and was assigned to a mortar battery in Gardez. Six weeks later, the Najibullah regime fell and he returned to Germany. In hearings in Guantanamo, Slahi has stated that he travelled to Afghanistan twice, attended the al Farouq training camp, and fought against the Afghan central government in 1992, but that he was never an enemy combatant against the United States. In fact, he was fighting on the same side as the United States, which in 1992 supported the Mujahideen fight against the communist government in Afghanistan.

Slahi's cousin and former brother-in-law is Mahfouz Ould al-Walid, also known as Abu Hafs al-Mauritani. Before the September 11 attacks in the United States, Al-Walid was a spiritual adviser to Osama bin Laden, was on the Shura council of al Qaeda, and headed the sharia council. Two months before the attacks, al-Walid, along with several other al Qaeda members, wrote a letter to bin Laden opposing the planned attacks. Al-Walid left al Qaeda after the attacks.

While al-Walid was in Sudan, where al Qaeda was based in the mid-1990s, he twice asked Slahi to help him get money to his family in Mauritania, about $4,000 in December 1997 and another $4,000 in December 1998. In the 2010 habeas corpus opinion for Slahi, the judge wrote: "the government relies on nothing but Slahi's uncorroborated, coerced statements to conclude that the money transfers were done on behalf of and in support of al-Qa'ida." In 1998, Slahi was heard by U.S. intelligence talking to al-Walid on a satellite phone traced to bin Laden.

The 9/11 Commission Report, based on the interrogations of Ramzi bin al-Shibh, stated that in 1999, Slahi advised three members of the Hamburg Cell to travel to Afghanistan to obtain training before waging jihad in Chechnya. The federal District Court in 2010 that reviewed Slahi's case found that Slahi "provided lodging for three men for one night at his home in Germany [in November 1999], that one of them was Ramzi bin al-Shibh and that there was discussion of jihad and Afghanistan." Besides Ramzi bin al-Shibh, Mr. Slahi's other two houseguests were future September 11 hijackers. Slahi claims it was merely a matter of hospitality to fellow Muslims.

== 1999–2002 ==
Slahi moved to Montreal, Quebec, Canada, in November 1999 because German immigration authorities would not extend his visa for residence in Germany. Since he was a hafiz, he was invited by the imam of a large mosque to lead Ramadan prayers. Ahmed Ressam, who was caught with explosives crossing the Canada–U.S. border in December 1999 as part of the 2000 millennium attack plot, had attended the same mosque. Since Slahi was known to U.S. intelligence through contact with his cousin Mahfouz Ould al-Walid, he was suspected by them of activating Ressam.

The Canadian Security Intelligence Service (CSIS) put Slahi under surveillance for several weeks but did not find any grounds to arrest him. According to a classified report of German intelligence, "there is not only no evidence of any involvement by Ould Slahi in the planning and preparation of the attacks, but also no indication that Ressam and Slahi knew each other."

Frustrated by Canada's refusal to arrest him, the CIA worked with Mauritanian intelligence to lure Slahi back by forcing his mother to call him under the false premise that Canada was going to arrest him and he had to return to Mauritania to be protected. Slahi left Canada on January 21, 2000, where he was arrested in Senegal at the request of United States authorities and questioned about the millennium plot. He was transferred to Mauritania to be interrogated by local authorities and United States FBI agents. After three weeks in custody, during which Slahi was accused of being involved in the millennium plot, he was released.

Slahi worked at various companies in Mauritania as an electrical engineer starting in May 2000. After the September 11 attacks, the U.S. renewed scrutiny of everyone suspected of having ties to al Qaeda. On September 29, he was again detained by the Mauritanian authorities for questioning. He cooperated with the authorities several more times and then for the last time starting on November 20, 2001. Slahi was interrogated by both Mauritanian officials and the FBI for seven days.

Then the CIA transported him to Jordan using extraordinary rendition. The CIA supervised his interrogation at a Jordanian prison for eight months. Slahi claims he was tortured and forced to confess to involvement with the millennium plot. On July 19, 2002, the CIA transported Slahi to Bagram, Afghanistan, where he was transferred to military custody and held at the detention facility. The US military flew Slahi to Guantanamo Bay detention camp on August 4, 2002.

== Guantánamo Bay detention, 2002–2016 ==
Detainee Assessment written in Guantánamo prison

Slahi was assigned detainee ID number 760 and was initially held in Camp Delta. Officials belonging to the CSIS interviewed Slahi in February 2003. He was among 14 men classified as high-value detainees, for whom United States Secretary of Defense Donald Rumsfeld authorized use of what were called enhanced interrogation methods, which have since been classified as torture. By January 2003, US military interrogators pressed to make Slahi their second "Special Project," drawing up an interrogation plan like that used against Mohammed al-Qahtani. Declassified documents show that Slahi was transferred to an isolation cell near the end of May and abusive interrogation started. He was subjected to extreme cold and noise, extended sleeplessness, forced standing or other postures for extended periods of time, threats against his family, sexual humiliation and other abuses.

In February 2015, a series in The Guardian reported that one of his interrogators was Richard Zuley, a career homicide detective with the Chicago Police Department, who was called in on assignment with the United States Navy Reserve. In Chicago, Zuley has been the subject of civil suits by inmates attributing similar abuse, including shackling, threats and coerced confessions.

In September 2003, Slahi was moved to Camp Echo. Memos summarizing meetings held on October 9, 2003, and February 2, 2004, between General Geoffrey Miller and Vincent Cassard of the International Committee of the Red Cross (ICRC) acknowledged that camp authorities were not permitting the ICRC to have access to Slahi, due to "military necessity."

Lt. Col V. Stuart Couch, a Marine Corps lawyer, was appointed as Slahi's prosecutor at Guantanamo. He withdrew from the case in May 2004 after reviewing it in depth. Couch said that he believed that Slahi "had blood on his hands," but he "could no longer continue the case in good conscience" because of the alleged torture, which tainted all confessions Slahi had made. Couch said that "the evidence is not believable because of the methods used to obtain it and the fact that it has not been independently corroborated."

The Wall Street Journal published a letter that Slahi wrote to his lawyers on November 9, 2006. In the letter, Slahi said all his confessions of crimes were the result of torture. He laughed at being asked to recount "everything" that he had said during interrogations, joking that it was "like asking Charlie Sheen how many women he dated."

In 2005, the internationally recognized criminal defense lawyer Nancy Hollander got involved in Slahi's case, together with lawyer Theresa Duncan. They argued Slahi's rights to a fair trial, despite criticism for defending a terrorist suspect.

=== Guantánamo Diary ===
Slahi started writing a memoir of his experiences in 2005, continuing into the next year. The 466-page manuscript was in English, a language Slahi learned at Guantánamo. After litigation and negotiation, the US government declassified the memoir in 2012, making numerous redactions. Excerpts were published by Slate magazine as a three-part series beginning April 30, 2013. On May 1, 2013, Slate also published a related interview with Col. Morris Davis, the military's chief prosecutor at Guantánamo from September 2005 to October 2007. Guantánamo Diary was published as a book in January 2015, the first work by a still-imprisoned detainee at Guantánamo. It provides details of Slahi's harsh interrogations and torture, including being "force-fed seawater, sexually molested, subjected to a mock execution and repeatedly beaten, kicked and smashed across the face, all spiced with threats that his mother will be brought to Guantánamo and gang-raped." It has become an international bestseller. Prison officials prevented Slahi from receiving a copy of his published book.

=== Joint Review Task Force ===
When he assumed office in January 2009, President Barack Obama repeated his commitment to close Guantanamo. He convened a six-agency task force to review the detainees and recommend those who could be released. In its 2010 report, the Guantánamo Review Task Force recommended Slahi be considered for prosecution in a military commission. The task force recommended that detainees deemed too dangerous to release, but without sufficient evidence for prosecution, receive a Periodic Review Board hearing. In 2013, Slahi was listed as one of 71 detainees eligible for a review. In March 2016, Slahi was granted a hearing before the Board in June.

=== Further interrogation request ===
U.S. district court James Robertson had issued an order to the Department of Defense barring them from interrogating Slahi while his habeas corpus case was under consideration. Guantánamo authorities in October 2014 seized all of Slahi's privileged legal papers and all his personal belongings, including a computer. They also stripped Slahi of his "comfort items," including letters from his late mother, in an attempt to force him to agree to interrogations. Slahi wrote in an unclassified letter to his attorneys in April 2015 that officials had offered to return these items if he agreed to interrogations, which had been barred for six years. Prosecutors in the case of Ahmed al-Darbi wanted to interrogate Slahi about him.

=== Torture ===
Slahi was last interrogated by the Federal Bureau of Investigation on May 22, 2003. He claimed an FBI interrogator warned him "this was our last session; he told me that I was not going to enjoy the time to come." Three months later Defense Secretary Rumsfeld approved the use of "enhanced interrogation techniques". Slahi was subjected to isolation, temperature extremes, beatings and sexual humiliation by military interrogators. In one incident, he was blindfolded and taken out to sea for a mock execution.

A 2007 Wall Street Journal report paraphrased an incident described in the 2005 Schmidt-Furlow Report, an investigation by the Department of Defense into detainee treatment at Guantanamo following FBI allegations of torture used by DOD interrogators in the early years of Guantanamo:

On July 17, 2003, a masked interrogator told Mr. Slahi he had dreamed of watching detainees dig a grave.... The interrogator said he saw "a plain, pine casket with [Mr. Slahi's] identification number painted in orange lowered into the ground."

In the summer of 2003, Slahi was repeatedly subjected to the use of an interrogation technique which the Schmidt-Furlow Report stated had been prohibited by the Secretary of Defense on December 2, 2002.

What was not revealed until 2008 was that in a March 14, 2003, legal opinion memo issued by John Yoo of the Office of Legal Counsel, Department of Justice, to the General Counsel of the Department of Defense, Yoo advised that federal laws related to torture and other abuses did not apply to interrogations overseas. At that point the Bush administration contended that Guantanamo Bay was outside US jurisdiction. The Defense Department used this memo to authorize the use of "enhanced interrogation techniques" at Guantanamo and in Iraq. Also, by 2005, The New York Times reported that by an April 2003 memo from Rumsfeld to General James T. Hill, commander of United States Southern Command, responsible for Guantanamo Bay, Rumsfeld authorized 24 specific permitted interrogation techniques to be used. Jack Goldsmith, head of the Office of Legal Counsel, withdrew the Yoo Torture Memos in June 2004 and advised federal agencies not to rely on them.

Slahi's lawyers in 2008 threatened to sue Mauritanian, Jordanian and U.S. officials over his torture.

The United States Senate Committee on Armed Services produced a report titled Inquiry into the Treatment of Detainees in U.S. Custody on November 20, 2008. It contains information about the treatment of Slahi and others at Guantanamo before 2005.

According to Peter Finn of The Washington Post in 2010, Slahi, along with Tariq al-Sawah, were "two of the most significant informants ever to be held at Guantanamo. Today, they are housed in a little fenced-in compound at the military prison, where they live a life of relative privilege – gardening, writing and painting – separated from other detainees in a cocoon designed to reward and protect."

=== Habeas corpus proceedings ===
In Rasul v. Bush (2004), the United States Supreme Court ruled that detainees at Guantánamo Bay detention camp had the right of habeas corpus to challenge their detention. Slahi had habeas petitions submitted on his behalf. In response, the Department of Defense published 27 pages of unclassified documents from his Combatant Status Review Tribunal (CSRT) on July 14, 2005.

The Military Commissions Act of 2006 (MCA) mandated that Guantánamo detainees were no longer entitled access to the U.S. federal courts, so all pending habeas petitions were stayed. However, in June 2008, the Supreme Court ruled in Boumediene v. Bush that the MCA of 2006 could not remove detainees' right to habeas and access to the federal court system. All previous habeas petitions were eligible to be re-instated.

Before submitting briefs in the habeas case, the U.S. government dropped its previous allegations that Slahi had participated in the Millennium Plot and that he knew about the 9/11 attacks before they happened.

=== Release order ===
After review of the case, U.S. District Court Judge James Robertson granted the writ of habeas corpus and ordered Slahi's release on March 22, 2010. Robertson's ruling was criticized by several Republican Party politicians. Slahi was the 34th detainee whose release was ordered by a federal district court judge reviewing government materials associated with his habeas petition. The unclassified decision was filed on April 9, 2010.

Referring to the government's charge that Slahi gave "purposeful and material support" to al Qaeda, Judge Robertson wrote:

Salahi may very well have been an al-Qaida sympathizer, and the evidence does show that he provided some support to al-Qaida, or to people he knew to be al-Qaida. Such support was sporadic, however, and, at the time of his capture, non-existent. In any event, what the standard approved in Al-Bihani actually covers is "those who purposefully and materially supported such forces in hostilities against U.S. Coalition partners." 530 F.3d at 872 (emphasis added). The evidence in this record cannot possibly be stretched far enough to fit that test.

Judge Robertson addressed the other government allegation, that Slahi was "part of" al Qaeda at the time of his capture. He said the law was not as clear in this instance:

neither Al-Bihani nor any other case provides a bright-line test for determining who was and who was not "part of" al-Qaida at the time of capture. The decision, in other words, depends on the sufficiency of the evidence. The question of when a detainee must have been a "part of" al-Qaida to be detainable is at the center of this case, because it is clear that Salahi was at one point a sworn al-Qaida member.

Judge Robertson discusses other factors in his decision, including which side had the burden of proof and considering the reliability of coerced or hearsay testimony. In conclusion, Judge Robertson stated:

The government had to adduce evidence – which is different from intelligence – showing that it was more likely than not that Salahi was "part of" al-Qaida. To do so, it had to show that the support Salahi undoubtedly did provide from time to time was provided within al-Qaida's command structure. The government has not done so.

=== Appeal ===
The Department of Justice appealed the decision. Oral arguments were heard on September 17, 2010, by a three-judge panel for the United States Court of Appeals for the District of Columbia Circuit. In oral arguments, Judge David S. Tatel questioned whether swearing bayat in 1991 is evidence of actions a decade and more later against the United States. He noted, "When he swore bayat, the United States and al-Qaeda had a common goal. Both the United States and al-Qaeda were opposing a communist government of Afghanistan." The panel discussed sending the case back to the District Court or over-ruling the decision, based on other recent D.C. Circuit rulings on the criteria that justify detention, which were still being developed.

On November 5, 2010, the D.C. Circuit Court of Appeals vacated the decision and remanded the case to the D.C. District Court for further factual findings, based on guidance it had given to the D.C. District Court about review of such habeas corpus cases of detainees. The Circuit Court panel said the following questions needed to be answered:

- whether Slahi understood that he was referring recruits to work in al-Qaeda's "jihad" against the U.S.,
- what Slahi may have said to bin al-Shibh in a discussion of jihad in Afghanistan,
- whether he had been asked by al-Qaeda to help with communications projects in Afghanistan and elsewhere,
- whether he had taken a role in planning computer "cyberattacks," and
- whether he remained "a trusted member" of al-Qaeda up to the time of his capture.

The District Court never held any hearings after the Court of Appeals decision.

Slahi had his first Periodic Review Board review on June 2, 2016. A month later, the board recommended that Slahi be released.

== Life after detention ==
On October 17, 2016, Slahi was released from GITMO and returned to Mauritania, after being detained without charge for over 14 years. He is not allowed to leave.

In 2017, CBS News journalist Holly Williams traveled to Mauritania to interview Slahi. CBS News' flagship news show, 60 Minutes, broadcast the story on March 12, 2017. CBS News described it as Slahi's first television interview since his repatriation. In this interview Mohamedou said he "wholeheartedly [forgives] everyone who wronged [him] during [his] detention." Slahi filed in April 2022 a legal claim against the Canadian government on the grounds that "faulty intelligence provided by Canadian authorities contributed to his detention" in 2002, seeking $35 million in compensation.

In May 2018, Slahi's former guard at Guantanamo, Steve Wood, visited him in Mauritania during Ramadan. It was covered in the 2020 documentary short film My Brother's Keeper.

On January 29, 2021, the New York Review of Books published an open letter from Slahi, and six other individuals who were formerly held in Guantanamo, to newly inaugurated US President Biden, appealing to him to close the detention camp.

In February 2021, a film adaption of his memoir titled The Mauritanian directed by Kevin Macdonald, and starring Jodie Foster, Tahar Rahim, Benedict Cumberbatch, and Shailene Woodley was released.

== Personal life ==
As of 2019, Slahi's passport had not been returned to him as was promised during his release. He has not been able to leave Mauritania to treat his health condition or see his newborn son in Germany. After his academic graduation in Germany in 1999, Slahi had registered himself as unemployed while also being involved in commercial activities which he failed to declare to the authorities, resulting in a suspended sentence for social fraud and a 20-year entry ban.

After having obtained citizenship in the Netherlands, the court Oberverwaltungsgericht in Münster concluded in early 2026 that the entry ban from 2000 had lost its basis and as a EU citizen, Slahi could travel to Germany.
