= List of resignations from the Guantanamo military commission =

This is a list of resignations from the Guantanamo military commission, including those of the prosecutors Stuart Couch, Morris "Moe" Davis, Fred Borch, Major Robert Preston, Captain John Carr, USAF Captain Carrie Wolf, and Darrel Vandeveld. They were among the military lawyers tasked to serve as prosecutors of the suspected terrorists imprisoned at the American Guantanamo Bay detainment camp. The military lawyers requested transfers to other assignments because they had concerns that the proceedings were not respecting the defendants' due process rights.

== Morris "Moe" Davis ==
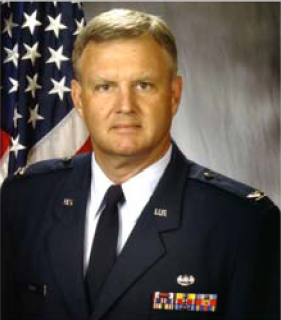
Morris Davis

Morris "Moe" Davis was an American JAG officer in the United States Air Force who resigned as Chief Prosecutor at the Guantanamo Military Commission in 2007 due to his objections to the use of waterboarding as a means to collect evidence from detainees. In 2008 Davis retired from the Air Force and went on to author several opinion pieces in The Wall Street Journal and The Washington Post that criticized activities at the Guantanamo Bay Military Commission. This led to his firing under the Hatch Act. The ACLU contested his termination and in 2016 Davis reported that he had won an out-of-court wrongful termination settlement against the Library of Congress for $100,000.

== Darrel J. Vandeveld ==
Darrel Vandeveld (born 1960) is an American lawyer with years of service as an infantry officer, including a Bronze Star from Operation Desert Storm, and JAG Officer in the United States Army Reserve.

After resigning from GITMO due to ethical reasons related to the prosecution of Mohamed Jawad, he was refused promotion. Despite his having numerous years and deployments in the military, both as a soldier and lawyer, receiving many decorations and commendations for his performance, the promotions board passed him over. This occurred after he submitted a 4-page declaration detailing his experience at GITMO, in which he had witnessing severe illegal activity from US military and politicians. After nearly 30 years of service, Vandeveld retired from the Reserve at the rank of Lieutenant Colonel.

Vandeveld is notable for asking to resign from his appointment as a prosecutor before a Guantanamo military commission. According to the New York Times, officials confirmed on September 24, 2008, that Vandeveld resigned over an ethical issue. He is the seventh prosecutor to resign from serving as a Guantanamo prosecutor.

Vandeveld was serving as a prosecutor in the case of Mohamed Jawad, a Pakistani youth who was charged with participating in a grenade attack in a bazaar in Afghanistan. Colonel Stephen R. Henley had been growing impatient with the prosecution, and had given them a deadline to share evidence they had withheld from defense attorney Major David J. R. Frakt, which he suspected could prove exculpatory.

The BBC reports that the withheld evidence includes the confessions of two men who said they were the ones who actually committed the attack.

Vandeveld's resignation was filed within the Military Commission system. The New York Times reported he had not commented publicly about his resignation. Carol Rosenberg, of the Miami Herald, quoted from Vandeveld's four-page resignation memo:

In my view evidence we have an obligation as prosecutors and officers of the court has not been made available to the defense. ... it seems plausible to me that Jawad may have been drugged before the alleged attack.

Frakt claimed that Vandeveld had recommended a plea bargain and an early release for Jawad, who was a youth when the event took place. Held by the United States since 2002, he had been subjected to coercive "enhanced interrogation techniques", including prolonged sleep deprivation in Guantanamo's frequent flyer program. Frakt commented that Vandeveld "could no longer continue to serve ethically as a prosecutor."

Chief Prosecutor Colonel Lawrence Morris asserted:

... there are no grounds for his ethical qualms ... All you have is somebody who is disappointed that his superiors did not agree with his recommendation in a case.

Morris' denigration of Vandeveld's claims was later refuted by the Bush administration, which admitted, as Vandeveld had contended, that the detainee prosecution files remained in a state of disarray some six years after the Commissions had first been formed.

Morris retired from the US Army within months after these revelations. He has since been appointed to a position created by the US Army JAG Corps for him upon his retirement: Chief of Trial Advocacy.

According to Josh Meyer, writing in the Los Angeles Times, Frakt planned to call Vandeveld as a witness on September 25 or 26, 2008. Vandeveld was willing to testify. But his superiors planned to block his testimony. According to Meyers, Frakt planned to ask Henley, the Presiding Officer, to compel Vandeveld's testimony.

== Robert Preston ==
Major Robert Preston is a lawyer, and an officer in the United States Air Force.

Together with Captain John Carr and USAF Captain Carrie Wolf, Preston was among the military lawyers tasked to serve as prosecutors of the suspected terrorists imprisoned at the American Guantanamo Bay detainment camp. All three military lawyers requested transfers to other assignments because they had concerns that the proceedings would be innately unjust. These memos were leaked to the press.

On August 1, 2005, the Australian newspaper, The Age published an article based on the leaked memos. It quoted Preston's memo:

I consider the insistence on pressing ahead with cases that would be marginal even if properly prepared to be a severe threat to the reputation of the military justice system and even a fraud on the American people. ... Surely they don't expect that this fairly half-arsed effort is all that we have been able to put together after all this time. ... After all, writing a motion saying that the process will be full and fair when you don't really believe it is kind of hard, particularly when you want to call yourself an officer and lawyer.

The article quoted Brigadier General Thomas Hemingway, another military lawyer, who served as a legal adviser to the Office of Military Commissions. He had tried to dismiss the memos as based on simple misunderstandings by the officers. Following an official investigation, the Chief Prosecutor, Colonel Fred Borch, to whom the memos were addressed, subsequently resigned from the military.

In the case of Hamdan v. Rumsfeld (2006), the United States Supreme Court found that the then-existing military commissions, created within the executive branch, lacked "the power to proceed because its structures and procedures violate both the UCMJ and the four Geneva Conventions." It said they were unconstitutional because they had not been authorized by Congress and were set up only within the executive branch.

== John Carr ==
Major John Carr is an officer and judge advocate in the United States Air Force.

Then-Captain Carr and fellow Air Force judge advocates Major Robert Preston and Captain Carrie Wolf were among the military lawyers assigned to prosecute the suspected terrorists imprisoned at the Guantanamo Bay detention camp. Carr, Preston and Wolf later requested reassignments because they believed the proceedings were designed to ensure no acquittals.

On August 1, 2005, The Age, published an article based on leaked memos. Quoted were comments from Carr's memos:

When I volunteered to assist with this process and was assigned to this office, I expected there would at least be a minimal effort to establish a fair process and diligently prepare cases against significant accused. ... Instead, I find a half-hearted and disorganised effort by a skeleton group of relatively inexperienced attorneys to prosecute fairly low-level accused in a process that appears to be rigged. ... You have repeatedly said to the office that the military panel will be handpicked and will not acquit these detainees and that we only needed to worry about building a record for the review panel.

Although Brigadier General Thomas Hemingway, a legal adviser to the Office of Military Commissions, tried to dismiss the memos as based on simple misunderstandings, an official investigation was conducted. The Chief Prosecutor to whom the memos were addressed, Colonel Fred Borch, subsequently resigned from the military.

== Carrie Wolf ==
Captain Carrie Wolf is an officer and judge advocate in the United States Air Force.

Wolf, Major Robert Preston, and Captain John Carr were among the military lawyers assigned to prosecute the suspected terrorists held at the Guantanamo Bay detention camp. These three later requested reassignments because they had concerns that the proceeding were rigged to ensure no acquittals.

On August 1, 2005, The Age, published an article based on the leaked memos from Preston and Carr. On August 3, 2005, The Age published another article that said Wolf had shared the concerns of the other two officers, and had also requested a transfer.

Although Brigadier General Thomas Hemingway, the Legal Adviser to the Office of Military Commissions, tried to dismiss the memos as based on simple misunderstandings, an official investigation was conducted. The Chief Prosecutor to whom the memos were addressed, Colonel Fred Borch, subsequently resigned from the military.

== See also ==
- Stuart Couch
- Morris "Moe" Davis
- Fred Borch
