= The Sixties: Years of Hope, Days of Rage =

1987 book by Todd Gitlin

- Author: Todd Gitlin
- Publisher: Bantam Press
- Publication date: 1987
- Pages: 513

The Sixties: Years of Hope, Days of Rage is a 1987 book by sociologist and activist Todd Gitlin about the political movements of the 1960s in the United States.

Gitlin, who was a leader of Students for a Democratic Society, integrates his personal experience with his historical narrative.
