= The Mauritanian =

2021 legal drama film directed by Kevin Macdonald

- Theatrical release poster
- Directed by: Kevin Macdonald
- Screenplay by: M.B. Traven; Rory Haines Sohrab Noshirvani
- Story by: M.B. Traven
- Based on: Guantanamo Diary by Mohamedou Ould Slahi
- Produced by: Adam Ackland; Michael Bronner; Benedict Cumberbatch; Leah Clarke; Christine Holder; Mark Holder; Beatriz Levin; Lloyd Levin; Branwen Prestwood-Smith
- Starring: Jodie Foster; Tahar Rahim; Shailene Woodley; Benedict Cumberbatch
- Cinematography: Alwin H. Küchler
- Edited by: Justine Wright
- Music by: Tom Hodge
- Production companies: Shadowplay Features; SunnyMarch; Wonder Street
- Distributed by: STXfilms (Note: In the United Kingdom, STXfilms' international arm STXinternational was to release The Mauritanian on 1 April 2021. As cinemas were closed in the UK in April due to the COVID-19 pandemic, the film skipped theatrical release and was instead released on Prime Video as an Amazon Original.)
- Release dates: 12 February 2021 (United States); 1 April 2021 (United Kingdom)
- Running time: 129 minutes
- Countries: United Kingdom; United States
- Languages: English; French; Arabic
- Box office: $7.5 million

The Mauritanian is a 2021 legal drama film based on the memoir of Mohamedou Ould Slahi, a Mauritanian man who was held from 2002 to 2016 without charge in the Guantanamo Bay detention camp, a United States military prison. The film was directed by Kevin Macdonald, based on a screenplay written by M.B. Traven, Rory Haines, and Sohrab Noshirvani, adapted from Slahi's 2015 memoir Guantánamo Diary. It stars Tahar Rahim as Slahi, and also features Jodie Foster, Shailene Woodley, Benedict Cumberbatch, and Zachary Levi in supporting roles.

The Mauritanian was released in the United States on 12 February 2021 by STXfilms. In the United Kingdom, where all cinemas were closed due to the COVID-19 pandemic, the planned cinema release was cancelled and the film was premiered on Amazon Prime Video on 1 April 2021. It received mixed to positive reviews, with critics praising Macdonald's direction, its cinematography and the performances of the cast (particularly of Rahim and Foster) but criticising its screenplay. At the 78th Golden Globe Awards the film received two nominations; Best Actor – Motion Picture Drama (for Rahim), with Foster winning Best Supporting Actress – Motion Picture. At the 74th British Academy Film Awards the film received five nominations, including Best Film, Outstanding British Film, and Best Actor (for Rahim).

== Plot ==
In November 2001, Mohamedou Ould Slahi is in Mauritania, two months after the September 11 attacks. A Mauritanian policeman tells Mohamedou that Americans want to have a talk with him. Mohamedou agrees to go with them.

In Albuquerque, New Mexico, in February 2005, lawyer Nancy Hollander is told by French lawyer Emmanuel that a lawyer from Mauritania approached his firm in Paris on behalf of Mohamedou's family. They haven't seen Mohamedou since he was arrested three years ago and only just found out in a newspaper that he is being held by the United States at the Guantanamo Bay detention camp and is accused of being one of the organizers of 9/11. Emmanuel asks Nancy to look into it because she has a security clearance from a previous case and can ask questions he can't. Nancy agrees to check.

At a Naval Law Conference in New Orleans, Marine Prosecutor Stuart Couch is told by Colonel Bill Seidel about the Mohamedou case which Seidel wants him to prosecute. Seidel says that Mohamedou fought with Al-Qaeda in the '90s and then recruited for them in Germany, and says it was Mohamedou who recruited the terrorist who flew Stu's friend's plane into the tower.

Nancy and Teri (her fellow lawyer) fly down to Guantánamo to meet Mohamedou. Mohamedou agrees to hire them as his lawyers. Meanwhile, Stu tells his team to go through all the intel reports they have to corroborate the story against Mohamedou.

Nancy finds out something through Mohamedou's letter which she received from him while Stu looks at the MFR (Memorandum for the Record), showing exactly what happened. The letter and reports talk about enhanced interrogation methods (i.e., torture) and other maltreatment including sexual assault upon Mohamedou by the Guantanamo guards as ordered by General Mandel. General Mandel also threatened the arrest and rape of his mother. Thus, to save his mother and to get the torture to stop, Mohamedou gave a false confession about being a terrorist. Stu withdraws from Mohamedou's prosecution in disgust.

In December 2009, at trial Mohamedou testified over video link to the court. In March 2010, Mohamedou received a letter informing him that his case was successful, and the judge has ordered him to be released. Text is shown telling us that it would be another 7 years before he actually was released, because the government appealed. His mother died in 2013 so he never saw her again. He was finally released in 2016, having spent 14 years in prison without ever being charged.

Finally, footage of the real Mohamedou arriving back in Mauritania is shown. Texts are shown, telling us Mohamedou lives in Mauritania and got married in 2018 to an American lawyer. They have a son, Ahmed, but haven't been able to live together as a family and are hoping a country will grant them protection and citizenship. Nancy and Teri are still lawyers working against injustice, and we see footage of Mohamedou giving them necklaces with their names in Arabic.

== Cast ==
- Jodie Foster as Nancy Hollander
- Tahar Rahim as Mohamedou Ould Slahi
- Shailene Woodley as Teri Duncan
- Benedict Cumberbatch as Lieutenant Colonel Stuart Couch
- Zachary Levi as Neil Buckland
- Saamer Usmani as Arjun
- Corey Johnson as Bill Seidel
- Denis Menochet as Emmanuel
- David Fynn as Kent
- Walter van Dyk as District Court of Columbia Judge
- Aly Deyde as Wedding Guest
- Baya Belal as Mohamedou's Mother
- Baba Mine as Deddahi
- Yanje Abellahi as Policeman
- Pope Jerrod as Joe
- Daniel Janks as John
- Ralph Lason as David

== Production ==
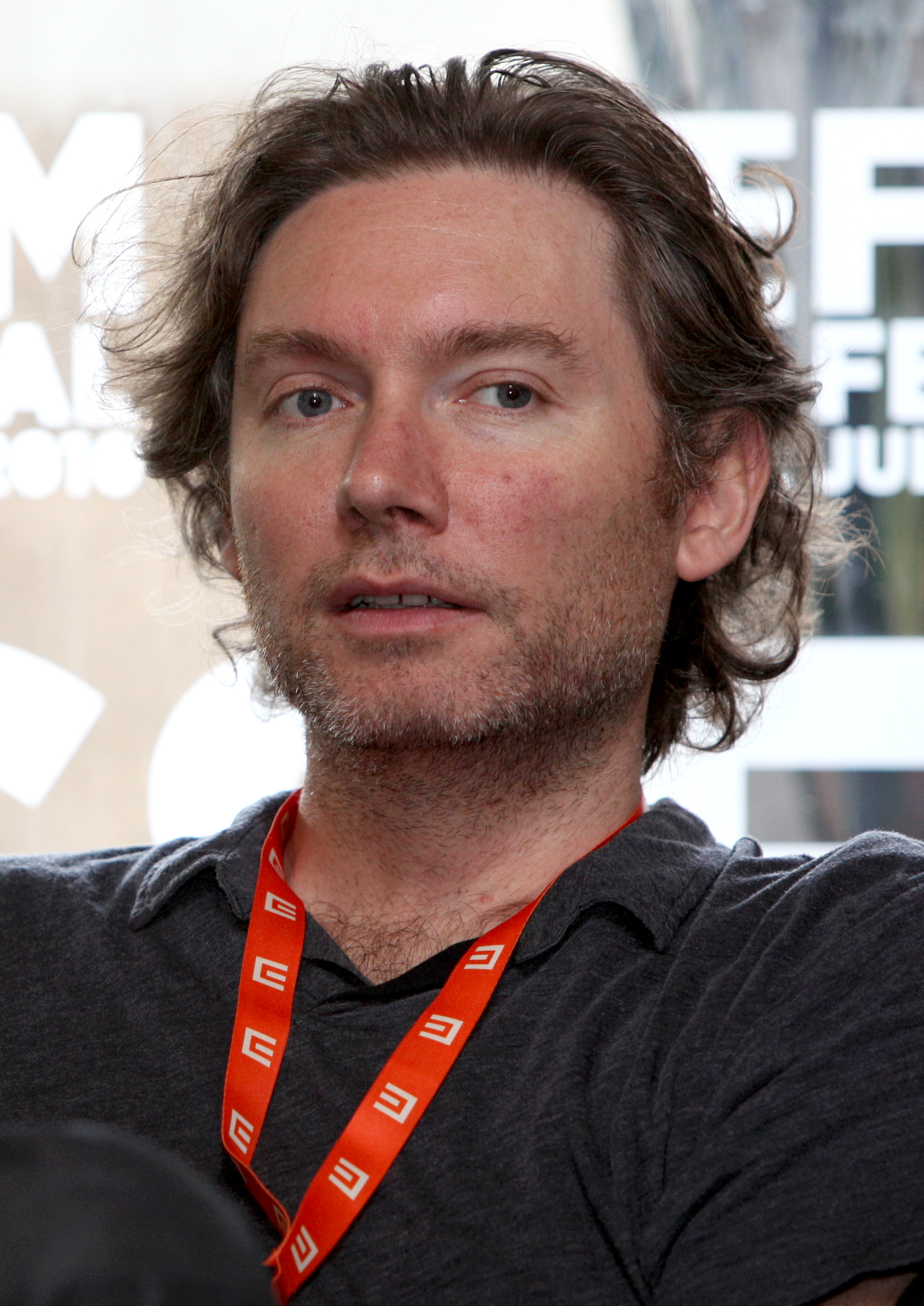
Director Kevin Macdonald, pictured in 2010

The film was announced in November 2019. Kevin Macdonald signed on as director, with Benedict Cumberbatch, Jodie Foster, Tahar Rahim and Shailene Woodley cast to star. In December 2019, Zachary Levi joined the cast of the film. Filming began on 2 December 2019 in South Africa.

The film was originally known as Guantánamo Diary in its early development stages, and as Prisoner 760 during production, before being described as untitled in post-production. In November 2020, the title was revealed to be The Mauritanian.

== Release ==
In August 2020, STX Entertainment acquired U.S. distribution rights to the film. STX International will release the film in the United Kingdom and Ireland and pre-sold the international distribution rights at the American Film Market in November 2019. The film was released in the United States on 12 February 2021 in theaters, with a digital demand release following on 2 March 2021.

== Reception ==
=== Box office ===
As of 1 April 2021, the film had made $835,724 domestically and $2,500,000 internationally, for a global total of $3,335,724.

The film was released alongside Judas and the Black Messiah, Land and limited expansion of Willy's Wonderland on 12 February 2021. The Mauritanian made $163,789 from 245 theaters, and $179,778 over the four-day President's Day weekend. In its second weekend of release the film earned $137,072 from 287 theaters. In its third weekend, the film took in $120,192, a decline of 12.3% from the second. In its fourth weekend, the film collected $90,004.

=== Critical response ===
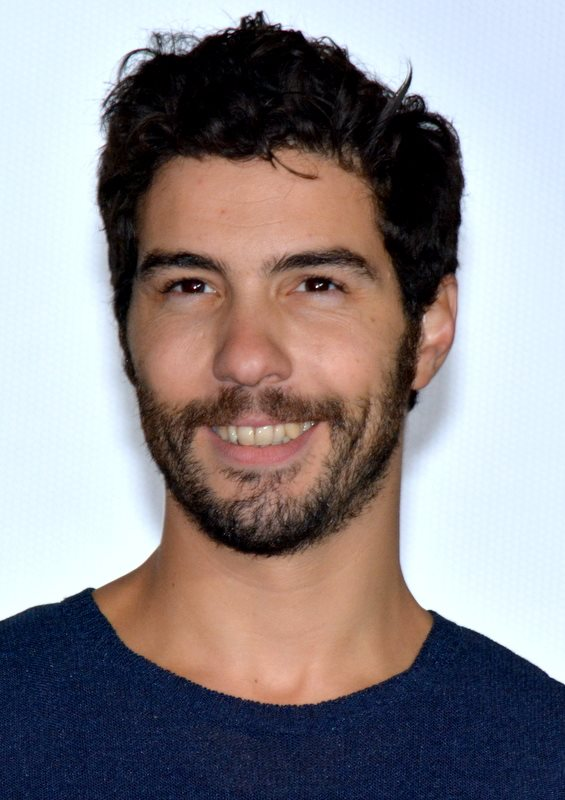
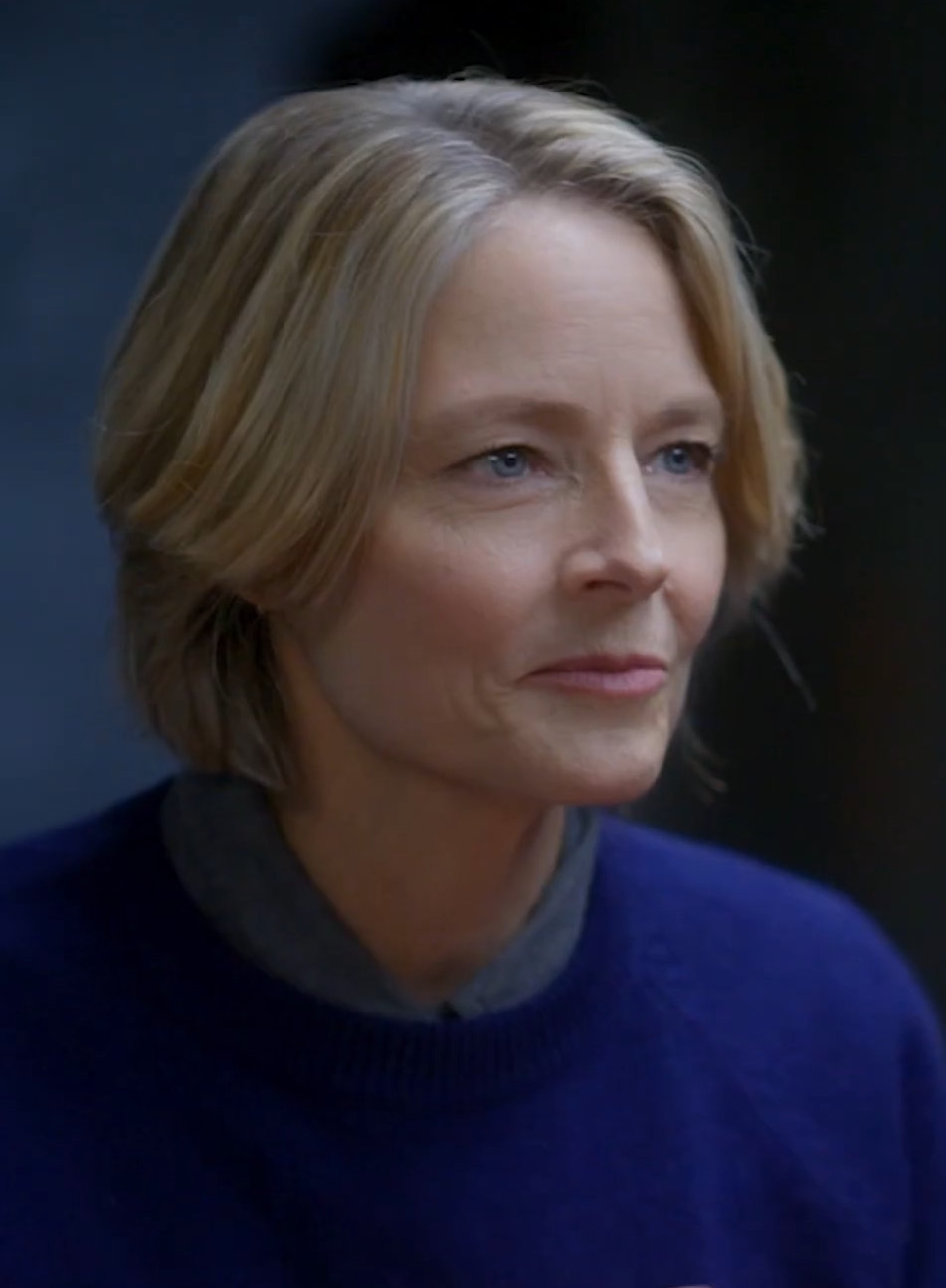
Rahim was nominated for the Golden Globe Award for Best Actor – Motion Picture Drama, while Foster won Best Supporting Actress.

Review aggregator Rotten Tomatoes reports that 75% of 217 critic reviews were positive, with an average rating of 6.6/10. The website's critics consensus reads: "The Mauritanian takes a frustratingly generic approach to a real-life story that might have been inspirational in other hands, but Tahar Rahim's performance elevates the uneven material." According to Metacritic, which sampled 35 critics and calculated a weighted average score of 53 out of 100, the film received "mixed or average reviews".

Leaf Arbuthnot, writing for Tatler, described the film as "excellent", praising in particular the performances of Foster and Rahim as "impeccable". The Hindu praised the performances of the cast, specifically of Foster, saying "she elevates the legal drama to a whole new level".

=== Accolades ===
Award	Date of ceremony	Category	Recipient(s)	Result	Ref.
AARP Movies for Grownups Award	4 March 2021	Best Supporting Actress	Jodie Foster	Won	
British Academy Film Award	April 11, 2021	Best Film	Adam Ackland, Leah Clarke, Beatriz Levin and Lloyd Levin	Nominated	
British Academy Film Award	April 11, 2021	Outstanding British Film	Kevin Macdonald, Adam Ackland, Leah Clarke, Beatriz Levin, Lloyd Levin, Rory Haines, Sohrab Noshirvani and M. B. Traven	Nominated	
British Academy Film Award	April 11, 2021	Best Actor in a Leading Role	Tahar Rahim	Nominated	
British Academy Film Award	April 11, 2021	Best Adapted Screenplay	M.B. Traven, Rory Haines and Sohrab Noshirvani	Nominated	
British Academy Film Award	April 11, 2021	Best Cinematography	Alwin H. Küchler	Nominated	
Casting Society of America	15 April 2021	Outstanding Achievement in Casting - Studio or Independent Feature - Drama	Nina Gold, Christa Schamberger (location casting)	Nominated	
European Film Awards	December 11, 2021	Best Actor	Tahar Rahim	Nominated	
Golden Globe Awards	February 28, 2021	Best Actor in a Motion Picture – Drama	Tahar Rahim	Nominated	
Golden Globe Awards	February 28, 2021	Best Supporting Actress in a Motion Picture	Jodie Foster	Won	
Heartland Film		Truly Moving Picture Award	Kevin Macdonald	Won	
London Film Critics' Circle Awards	February 7, 2021	Film of the Year	The Mauritanian	Nominated	
London Film Critics' Circle Awards	February 7, 2021	Director of the Year	Kevin Macdonald	Nominated	
London Film Critics' Circle Awards	February 7, 2021	Actor of the Year	Tahar Rahim	Nominated	
Women Film Critics Circle Awards		Best Actor	Tahar Rahim	Nominated	
Women Film Critics Circle Awards		Best Female Action Hero	Jodie Foster	Nominated	
