= Guantánamo Diary (memoir) =

2015 memoir written by Mohamedou Ould Salahi

- First edition (redacted)
- Author: Mohamedou Ould Slahi
- Genre: Memoir
- Publisher: Little, Brown
- Publication date: 2015

Guantánamo Diary is a 2015 memoir written by Mohamedou Ould Slahi, whom the United States held, without charge, for fourteen years. Slahi was one of the few individuals held in Guantánamo Bay detention camp whom U.S. officials acknowledged had been tortured. The 2015 edition was heavily redacted by U.S. intelligence officials. In 2017 a "restored edition" was published with redactions removed.

== History ==
Slahi wrote the book in 2005 in the English he had learned largely in Guantánamo. Each page had to be submitted to military censors who made 2,500 redactions before releasing the manuscript to Slahi's attorneys seven years later. Editor Larry Siems edited the handwritten manuscript passed to him by Slahi's lawyers. The memoir was auctioned and published while Slahi was still being held without charge.

Many reviewers were surprised at how lacking in bitterness Slahi was since he had been subjected to brutal torture.

In 2017, the book was republished with the redactions restored.

== Film rights ==
Movie producers bought an option on the rights to make a movie from the memoirs in June 2015. Producers Lloyd Levin and Michael Bronner had previously collaborated on the films United 93 and Green Zone. In 2016 a team of producers, including Benedict Cumberbatch, came aboard.
