= Stuart Couch =

American lawyer, veteran, and immigration judge (born 1965)

Personal details
- Born: April 20, 1965 (age 61)
- Education: Duke University (BA); Campbell University (JD); George Washington University (LLM)

Military service
- Allegiance: United States
- Branch/service: United States Marine Corps
- Years of service: 1987–2009
- Rank: Lieutenant Colonel
- Unit: United States Marine Corps Judge Advocate Division

Stuart Couch (born April 20, 1965) is an American lawyer, veteran, and immigration judge. Couch took a conscience-driven decision to refuse to prosecute an accused man because he had been tortured by Americans to obtain evidence against him. He was played by Benedict Cumberbatch in a resulting film.

== Early life and education ==
Couch graduated from Duke University on a Navy ROTC scholarship in 1987 and was commissioned into the United States Marine Corps as a Second Lieutenant. He was qualified as a naval aviator in November 1989 and flew KC-130 transport aircraft until he attended law school beginning in 1993. He graduated from the Campbell University School of Law with a J.D. in 1996 and was certified as a U.S. Marine Corps judge advocate officer. In 2008 he graduated with a Master of Laws in litigation and dispute resolution from George Washington University.

== Career as military prosecutor ==
=== Cavalese cable car massacre ===
Couch was one of three prosecutors of U.S. Marine Corps pilots in three trials involving the collision of a military jet with a ski gondola system in Cavalese, Italy that caused the deaths of twenty European tourists. Couch successfully prosecuted Marine Captains Richard J. Ashby and Joseph Schweitze for obstruction of justice in 1999 related to the destruction of video recordings of the incident. "He needs to pay the price for his criminal conduct. Capt. Ashby needs to feel the sting for what he has done. He doesn't deserve to wear a uniform" Couch said to jurors at the trial.

=== MV-22 Osprey tiltrotor cover-up ===
In 2001, Couch returned to active duty to prosecute Lt. Col. Odin F. Leberman, the commanding officer of the Marine Corps' only V-22 tiltrotor squadron for falsifying maintenance records. The MV-22 tiltrotor was in development for decades with continued mishaps. Increased costs led to scrutiny by Congress. Leberman had ordered his squadron to falsify maintenance records to make the failure prone tiltrotor seem more reliable before a congressional decision on funding. Leberman later accepted administrative punishment which effectively ended his military career.

=== Parachute sabotage case ===
In January 2003, Couch served as lead prosecutor in the case of Lance Corporal Antoine Boykins, a parachute rigger who sabotaged the chutes of 13 fellow Marines prepared for a low-altitude jump near Camp Lejeune, North Carolina. Three of the parachutes were actually used by jumpers who exited a C-17 airplane, but successfully deployed their emergency reserve chutes and landed safely. Boykins pleaded guilty to charges of nine counts of reckless endangerment, four counts of aggravated assault and one count of destruction of government property. On August 7, 2003, Boykins was sentenced to confinement for 20 years and a dishonorable discharge from the service.

=== Case of Mohamedou Ould Slahi ===
In September 2003, Couch was assigned to prepare the prosecution of Mohamedou Ould Slahi after he joined the Office of Military Commissions in August 2003. At that time, Slahi was seen as one of the most important detainees at Guantanamo with allegations that he had helped organize the 9/11 attacks. Couch, as a veteran of the navy's SERE program, on a visit to Guantanamo in October 2003 by chance witnessed an interrogation of a detainee unrelated to his docket. The prisoner was chained to the floor, swaying back and forth, and blasted with heavy metal music and strobe lights. It reminded him of the SERE training he went through as a pilot. After being told by his escort that the procedure had been approved, it "started keeping me up at night ... I couldn't stop thinking about it."

Later he learned that Slahi had been subjected to even worse interrogation methods, including beatings, prolonged isolation, extreme cold temperatures, and threatened with death as well as the arrest of his mother. Slahi was eventually hallucinating. "For me, that was just, enough is enough. I had seen enough, I had heard enough, I had read enough. I said: 'That's it." "When I heard that, I knew I gotta get off the fence," "Here was somebody I felt was connected to 9/11, but in our zeal to get information, we had compromised our ability to prosecute him."

Inspired by the writings of Dietrich Bonhoeffer, a Protestant theologian who had been executed by the Nazis, and hearing the question if he would "respect the dignity of every human being" at a church service, Couch made the decision to refuse to prosecute. In 2004, Couch withdrew from Slahi's prosecution team because he believed he was asked to use evidence obtained through means of coercive interrogation that violated the Uniform Code of Military Justice, U.S. laws, and the United States' treaty obligations.

After Wall Street Journal reporter Jess Bravin's article "The Conscience of the Colonel" was published on March 31, 2007, Couch received widespread recognition and international media coverage for his refusal to prosecute Slahi. He was presented the American Bar Association's Maleng "Minister of Justice" award in 2007 as well as the German Bar Association Criminal Law Section's "Pro Reo" Award in 2009. In 2021, a feature film based on Slahi's detention The Mauritanian included the role of Lieutenant Colonel Couch as portrayed by the actor Benedict Cumberbatch.

=== Congressional testimony ===
Couch was scheduled to testify before the House Judiciary Committee on November 8, 2007. An e-mail from the Department of Defense's General Counsel, William J. Haynes, II, informed him on November 7, 2007: "... as a sitting judge and former prosecutor, it is improper for you to testify about matters still pending in the military court system, and you are not to appear before the committee to testify tomorrow."

Congressional Representative Jerrold Nadler criticized the Bush administration for stonewalling by withholding Couch's testimony.

=== Case of Salim Hamdan—Hamdan v. Rumsfeld ===
From January 2005 until July 2006 Couch was the lead prosecutor for Salim Hamdan, a senior bodyguard and personal driver of Osama bin Laden. In that role he served as liaison to Solicitor General Paul Clement who argued before the U.S. Supreme Court in the case Hamdan v. Rumsfeld (2006), related to the constitutionality of President Bush's authority to order prosecutions before military commissions at Guantánamo and applicability of Common Article 3 of the Geneva Conventions. The Bush administration eventually lost the case, and with that their ability to set up war crimes tribunals. The New York Times wrote that the Supreme Court ruled "broadly that the commissions were unauthorized by federal statute and violated international law."

=== Case of Mamdouh Habib ===
From December 2003 through January 2005, Couch was assigned as a prosecutor for the case of Mamdouh Habib, an Australian national born in Egypt. Jess Bravin, the author of "The Terror Courts", describes how Couch and the military commissions appointing authority John Altenburg scuttled a Bush administration demand that charges be filed against Habib. After reviewing the evidence made available to him, Couch was convinced there was insufficient evidence to charge Habib with anything. In addition, Habib was a victim of a US government extraordinary rendition and appeared to have been subject to torture while held in an Egyptian prison.

== Career as judge ==
Couch left the Office of Military Commissions in 2006 and served on the U.S. Navy-Marine Corps Court of Criminal Appeals as a Senior Appellate Judge until his retirement in 2009. In October 2010 he was appointed to be an immigration judge by Attorney General Eric Holder. He was appointed by Attorney General William Barr to the Board of Immigration Appeals in August 2019.

== See also ==
- Robert Preston (military lawyer)
- Carrie Wolf
- John Carr (military lawyer)
- Stephen Abraham
