= Perfect Soldiers =

Perfect Soldiers may refer to:

- Perfect Soldiers (book) a 2005 book about the 9/11 hijackers by Terry McDermott
- Perfect Soldiers (video game), a 1993 arcade game
