= Mohamed Atta =

9/11 hijacker (1968–2001)

- محمد عطا
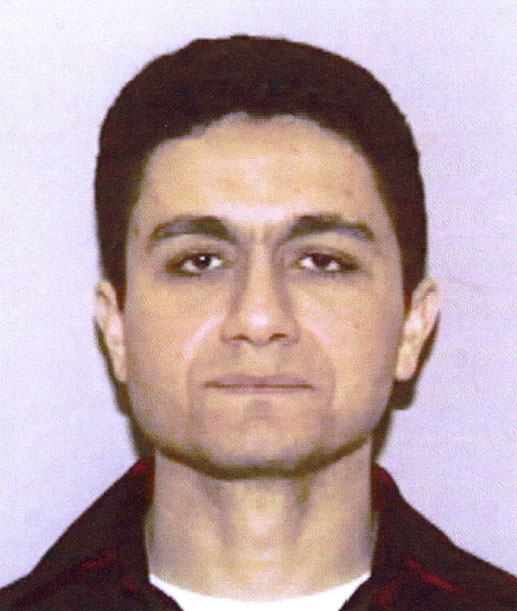
- Atta in May 2001
- Born: Mohamed el-Amir Awad el-Sayed Atta; September 1, 1968; Kafr El Sheikh, Egypt
- Died: September 11, 2001 (aged 33); New York City, U.S.
- Cause of death: Suicide by plane crash against the North Tower during the September 11 attacks
- Education: Cairo University; Hamburg University of Technology
- Organization(s): Al-Qaeda; Hamburg cell (1990s–2001)
- Known for: Ringleader of the 9/11 attacks and hijacker-pilot of American Airlines Flight 11
- Height: 5 ft 8 in (1.73 m)
- Motive: Motives for the September 11 attacks
- Accomplices: Abdulaziz al-Omari, Wail al-Shehri, Waleed al-Shehri, and Satam al-Suqami

Details
- Victims: ~1,687 (including the 87 victims of AA 11)
- Date: September 11, 2001; 8:46 a.m. (EDT)
- Country: United States
- State: New York
- Location: Manhattan
- Target: 1 World Trade Center
- Injured: 6,000–25,000
- Weapon: Hijacked Boeing 767-223ER
- Mohamed Atta's voice Atta's second announcement on air traffic radio Recorded September 11, 2001

Mohamed Atta (Note: Full name: Mohamed Mohamed el-Amir Awad el-Sayed Atta; Arabic: محمد محمد الأمير عوض السيد عطا, romanized: Muḥammad Muḥammad al-Amīr ʿAwaḍ as-Sayyid ʿAṭṭā.) (September 1, 1968 – September 11, 2001) was an Egyptian engineer, architect, who participated in the September 11 attacks as one of the hijackers. Ideologically a pan-Islamist, he was the ringleader of the September 11 attacks and served as the hijacker-pilot of American Airlines Flight 11, which he flew into the North Tower of the original World Trade Center as part of coordinated suicide attacks. Aged thirty-three years, he was the oldest of the 19 hijackers who took part in the mission. Before the attacks, he worked as a civil engineer.

Born and raised in Egypt, Atta studied architecture at Cairo University, graduating in 1990, and pursued postgraduate studies in Germany at the Hamburg University of Technology. In Hamburg, Atta attended prayers at the al-Quds Mosque where he met Marwan al-Shehhi, Ramzi bin al-Shibh, and Ziad Jarrah, with whom he formed the Hamburg cell. Atta disappeared from Germany for periods of time, embarking on the hajj in 1995 but also meeting Osama bin Laden and other top al-Qaeda leaders in Afghanistan from late 1999 to early 2000. Atta and the other Hamburg cell members were recruited by bin Laden and Khalid Sheikh Mohammed for a "planes operation" in the United States.

Atta returned to Hamburg in February 2000 and began inquiring about flying training in the United States, where he, Jarrah, and al-Shehhi arrived in June to learn how to pilot planes; Atta obtained his instrument rating in November and his commercial pilot's license in December. Beginning in May 2001, Atta assisted with the arrival of the "muscle" hijackers whose role was to subdue passengers and crew to enable the hijacker-pilots to take over. In July, Atta traveled to Spain to meet with bin al-Shibh to finalize the plot, then in August traveled as a passenger on "surveillance" flights to establish in detail how the attacks could be carried out.

On the morning of September 11, 2001, Atta and his team boarded and hijacked American Airlines Flight 11, which Atta flew into 1 World Trade Center. More than 1,600 people died as a result of the impact, ensuing fire, and subsequent collapse of the tower, making him responsible for the single deadliest air crash of all time. Atta's motives for participating in the September 11 attacks were linked to his opposition to U.S. policy in the Middle East, particularly the American military presence in the region and U.S. support for Israel.

== Aliases ==
Mohamed Atta had varied his name on documents, also using "Mehan Atta", "Mohammad El Amir", "Muhammad Atta", "Mohamed El Sayed", "Mohamed Elsayed", "Muhammad al-Amir", "Awag Al Sayyid Atta", and "Awad Al Sayad". In Germany, he registered his name as "Mohamed el-Amir Awad el-Sayed Atta", and went by the name Mohamed el-Amir at the Hamburg University of Technology. In his will, written in 1996, Atta gives his name as "Mohamed the son of Mohamed Elamir awad Elsayed". He was known as Abd al-Rahman al-Misri by al-Qaeda. Atta also claimed different nationalities, sometimes Egyptian and other times telling people he was from the United Arab Emirates. During his flight training in Florida, he claimed to be a member of the Saudi royal family.

== Early life ==
Mohamed Atta was born on September 1, 1968, in Kafr el-Sheikh, located in the Nile Delta region of Egypt (then a part of the United Arab Republic). His father, Mohamed el-Amir Awad el-Sayed Atta, was a lawyer, educated in both civil law and sharia. His mother, Buthayna Mohamed Mustafa Shiraqi, came from a wealthy farming and trading family and was also educated. Buthayna and Mohamed married when she was 14, via an arranged marriage. The family had few relatives on the father's side and kept their distance from Buthayna's family. In-laws characterized Atta's father as "austere, strict, and private", and neighbors viewed the family as reclusive. Atta was the only son; he had two older sisters who are both well-educated and successful in their careers – one as a medical doctor and the other as a professor.

When Atta was ten, his family moved to the Cairo neighborhood of Abdeen, situated near the city center. His father, who kept the family ever insulated, forbade young Atta to fraternize with the other children in their neighborhood. Having little else to do, he mostly studied at home and easily excelled in school. In 1985, Atta enrolled at Cairo University and focused his studies on engineering. He was among the highest-scoring students; by his senior year, he was admitted to an exclusive architecture program. After he graduated in 1990 with an architecture degree, he joined the Engineers Syndicate. He then worked for several months at the Urban Development Center in Cairo, where he joined various building projects and dispatched diverse architectural tasks. Also in 1990, Atta's family moved into the eleventh floor of an apartment building in Giza.

Atta also got engaged to a woman lined up by his father and her family in Cairo, in late 1999, after coming back from Germany the same year. Although the marriage never happened, Atta's father said they liked each other.

== Life in Germany ==
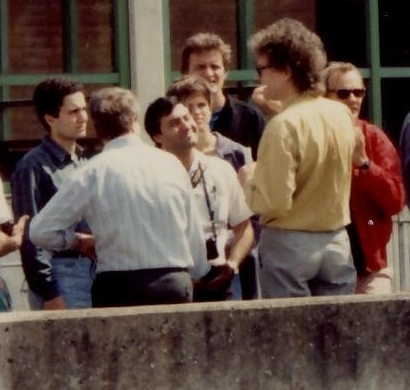
Mohamed Atta (left) as a student in Germany, May 1993

Atta graduated from Cairo University with marks insufficient for the graduate program. His father insisted that he go abroad for graduate studies, so Atta entered a German-language program at the Goethe-Institut in Cairo. In 1992, his father overheard a German couple who were visiting Egypt's capital. The couple explained at dinner that they ran an exchange program and invited Atta to continue his studies in Hamburg, Germany; they also offered him room and board at their home in the city. Atta accepted and arrived in Hamburg two weeks later, on 24 July.

On November 23, he enrolled in the urban planning graduate program at the Hamburg University of Technology. Atta initially lived with two high school teachers; however, they eventually found his closed-mindedness and introverted personality to be too much for them. Atta began adhering to the strictest Islamic diet, frequenting the most conservative mosques, socializing seldom, and acting disdainfully towards the couple's unmarried daughter who had a young child. After six months, they asked him to leave.

By early 1993, Atta had moved into university housing with two roommates, in Centrumshaus. He stayed there until 1998. During that period, his roommates grew annoyed with him. He rarely bathed, and they could not bear his "complete, almost aggressive insularity". He kept to himself to such an extent that he would often react to simple greetings with silence.

=== Academic studies ===
At the Hamburg University of Technology, Atta studied under the guidance of the department chair, Dittmar Machule, who specialized in the Middle East. Atta was averse to modern development. This included the construction of high-rise buildings in Cairo and other ancient cities in the region. He believed that the drab and impersonal apartment blocks, built in the 60s and 70s, ruined the beauty of old neighborhoods and robbed their people of privacy and dignity. Atta's family moved into an apartment block in 1990; it was to him but "a shabby symbol of Egypt's haphazard attempts to modernize and its shameless embrace of the West." For his thesis, Atta concentrated on the ancient Syrian city of Aleppo. He researched the history of the urban landscape in relation to the general theme of conflict between Arab and modern civilization. He criticized how skyscrapers and other modernizing projects disrupted the fabric of communities by blocking common streets and altering the skyline.

Atta's professor, Dittmar Machule, brought him along on an archaeological expedition to Aleppo in 1994. The invitation had been for a three-day visit, but Atta ended up staying several weeks that August, only to visit Aleppo yet again that December. While in Syria, he met Amal, a young Palestinian woman who worked for a planning bureau in the city. Volker Hauth, who was traveling with Atta, described Amal as "attractive and self-confident". She observed Muslim customs, taking taxis to and from the office so as not to come into close physical contact with men on buses. But she was also said to be "emancipated" and "challenging". Atta and Amal appeared to be attracted to each other, but Atta soon decided that "she had a quite different orientation and that the emancipation of the young lady did not fit." His nascent infatuation with her, begrudgingly realised, was the closest thing Atta knew to romance.

In mid-1995, he stayed for three months in Cairo, on a grant from the Carl Duisberg Society, along with fellow students Volker Hauth and Ralph Bodenstein. The academic team inquired into the effects of redevelopment in the Islamic Cairo, the old quarter, which the government undertook to remodel for tourism. Atta stayed in Cairo for a while with his family after Hauth and Bodenstein flew back to Germany.

While in Hamburg, Atta held several positions, including a part-time job at the urban planning firm Plankontor beginning in 1992. He was let go from the firm in 1997, however, because its business had declined and "his draughtsmanship was not needed" after it bought a CAD system. Among other odd jobs to supplement his income, Atta sometimes worked at a cleaning company and sometimes bought and sold cars. Atta had harbored a desire to return to his native city ever since he finished his studies in Hamburg, but he was prevented by the dearth of job prospects in Cairo, his family lacking the "right connections" to avail the customary nepotism. Further, after the Egyptian government had imprisoned droves of political activists, he knew better than to trust it not to target him too, with his social and political beliefs being such as they were.

=== Religious zeal and Hamburg cell ===
After coming to Hamburg in 1992, Atta grew more religiously fanatical and visited the mosque with greater regularity. His friends in Germany described him as an intelligent man in whom religious convictions and political motives held equal sway. He harbored anger and resentment toward the U.S. for its policy in Islamic nations of the Middle East, and in particular the Oslo Accords and the Gulf War. He was also angry and bitter at the elite in his native Egypt, who he believed hoarded power for themselves, as well as at the Egyptian government, that cracked down on the dissident Muslim Brotherhood. Atta was antisemitic, believing that Jews controlled the world's media, financial, and political institutions from New York City. These beliefs were even stronger during Operation Infinite Reach, as he believed that Monica Lewinsky was a Jewish agent influencing American president Bill Clinton against aiding Palestine, which would later play a key role in creating the Hamburg cell.

On August 1, 1995, Atta returned to Egypt for three months of study. Before this trip he grew out a beard to show himself as a devout Muslim and also to make a political gesture. Atta returned to Hamburg on October 31, 1995, only to join the pilgrimage to Mecca shortly thereafter.

In Hamburg, Atta was intensely drawn to al-Quds Mosque which adhered to a "harsh, uncompromisingly fundamentalist, and resoundingly militant" version of Sunni Islam. He made acquaintances at al-Quds, some of whom visited him on occasion at Centrumshaus. He began teaching classes both at al-Quds and at a Turkish mosque near the Harburg borough. Atta started and led a prayer group, which Ahmed Maklat and Mounir el-Motassadeq joined. He became friends with Ramzi bin al-Shibh, who also occasionally taught classes.

On April 11, 1996, Atta signed his last will and testament at the mosque, officially declaring his Muslim beliefs and giving 18 instructions regarding his burial. This was the same day that Israel, to Atta's fury, attacked Lebanon in Operation Grapes of Wrath; signing the will "offering his life" was his response. The instructions in his last will and testament reflect both Sunni funeral practices and some more puritanical demands from Salafism, including asking people not "to weep and cry" and to generally refrain from showing emotion. The will was signed by el-Motassadeq and a second person at the mosque.

After leaving Plankontor in the summer of 1997, Atta disappeared again and did not return until 1998. He had made no progress on his thesis. Atta phoned his graduate advisor, Machule, and mentioned family problems at home, saying, "Please understand, I don't want to talk about this." At the winter break in 1997, Atta left and did not return to Hamburg for three months. He said that he went on pilgrimage to Mecca again, just 18 months after his first time. This claim has been disputed; American journalist Terry McDermott has argued that it is unusual for someone to go on pilgrimage so soon after the first time and to spend three months there (more than Hajj requires). When Atta returned, he claimed that his passport was lost and applied for a new one, which is a common tactic to erase evidence of travel to places such as Afghanistan. When he returned in spring 1998, after disappearing for several months, he had grown a thick long beard, and "seemed more serious and aloof" than before to those who knew him.

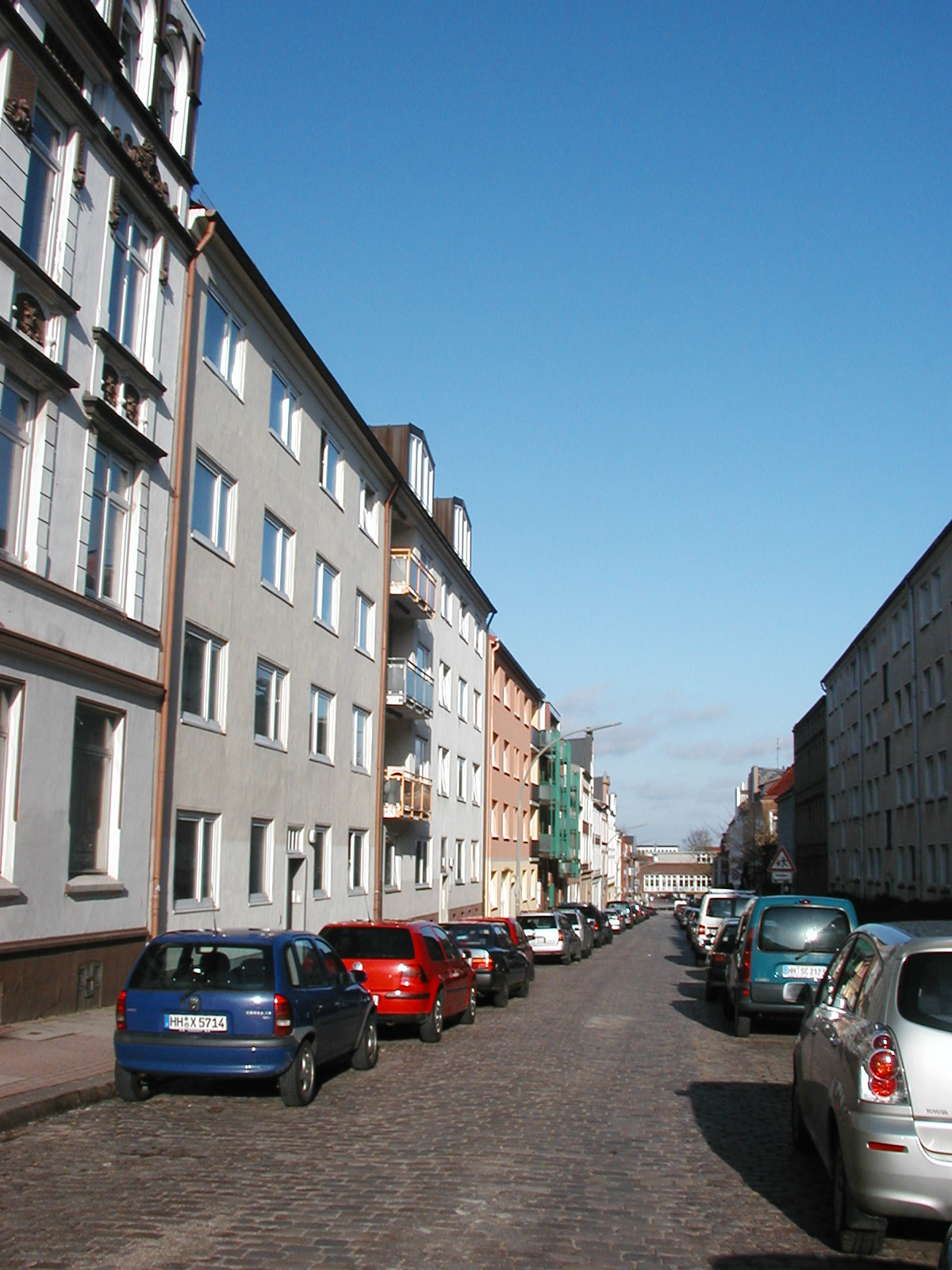
The apartment Atta, Bahaji, and bin al-Shibh shared from 1998 until 2001 in Marienstrasse, Hamburg, Germany

By mid-1998, Atta was no longer eligible for university housing in Centrumshaus. Atta, Ramzi, and Said Bahaji moved into a Hamburg apartment, which they supposedly named bayt al-ansar. By early 1999, Atta had completed his thesis, and formally defended it in August 1999.

In mid-1998, Atta worked alongside al-Shehhi, bin al-Shibh, and Belfas, at a warehouse, packing computers in crates for shipping. The Hamburg group did not stay in Wilhelmsburg for long. On November 1, 1998, they moved into an apartment at Marienstrasse 54 in the borough of Harburg, and enrolled at the nearby Hamburg University of Technology. It was here that the Hamburg cell developed and acted more as a group. They met three or four times a week to discuss their anti-American feelings and to plot possible attacks. Many al-Qaeda members lived in this apartment at various times, including Zakariya Essabar and hijacker Marwan al-Shehhi.

In late 1999, Atta, al-Shehhi, Jarrah, Bahaji, and bin al-Shibh decided to travel to Chechnya to fight against the Russians in the Second Chechen War, but were convinced by Khalid al-Masri and Mohamedou Ould Salahi at the last minute to change their plans. They instead traveled to Afghanistan for two weeks in late November. On November 29, 1999, Mohamed Atta boarded Turkish Airlines Flight TK1662 from Hamburg to Istanbul, where he changed to flight TK1056 to Karachi, Pakistan. After they arrived, they were selected by al-Qaeda leader Mohammed Atef as suitable candidates for the "planes operation" plot. They were all well-educated, had experience of living in western society, along with some English skills, and would be able to obtain visas. Even before bin al-Shibh had arrived, Atta, al-Shehhi, and Jarrah were sent to the House of Ghamdi near bin Laden's home in Kandahar, where he was waiting to meet them. Bin Laden asked them to pledge loyalty and commit to suicide missions, which Atta and the other three Hamburg men all did. Bin Laden sent them to see Atef for a general overview of the mission, and then they were sent to Karachi to see Khalid Sheikh Mohammed to go over specifics.

German investigators said that they had evidence that Mohamed Atta trained at al-Qaeda camps in Afghanistan from late 1999 to early 2000. The timing of this training was outlined on August 23, 2002, by Klaus Ulrich Kersten, who was at the time the director of Germany's federal anticrime agency, the Bundeskriminalamt. He provided the first official confirmation that Atta and two other pilots had been in Afghanistan, and gave the first dates of the training. Kersten said in an interview at the agency's headquarters in Wiesbaden that Atta was in Afghanistan from late 1999 until early 2000, and that there was evidence that Atta had met with Osama bin Laden there.

A video surfaced in October 2006. The first chapter of the video showed bin Laden at Tarnak Farms on January 8, 2000. The second chapter showed Atta and Ziad Jarrah reading their wills together ten days later on January 18. On his return journey, Atta left Karachi on February 24, 2000, by flight TK1057 to Istanbul where he changed to flight TK1661 to Hamburg. Immediately after returning to Germany, Atta, al-Shehhi, and Jarrah reported their passports stolen, possibly to discard travel visas to Afghanistan.

== Life in the United States ==
On March 22, 2000, Atta was still in Germany when he sent an e-mail to the Academy of Lakeland in Florida. He inquired about flight training, "Dear sir, we are a small group of young men from different Arab countries. Now, we are living in Germany since a while for study purposes. We would like to start training for the career of airline professional pilots. In this field, we haven't yet any knowledge but we are ready to undergo an intensive training program (up to ATP and eventually higher)." Atta sent 50–60 similar e-mails to other flight training schools in the United States.

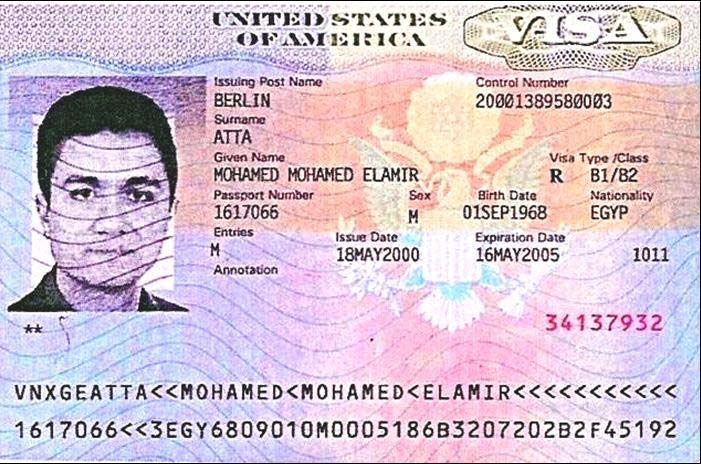
Atta's U.S. visa (photocopies of some of the visa pages were found in Atta's luggage which wasn't loaded onto the plane)

On May 17, Atta applied for a United States visa. The next day, he received a five-year B-1/B-2 (tourist/business) visa from the United States embassy in Berlin. Atta had lived in Germany for approximately five years and also had a "strong record as a student". He was therefore treated favorably and not scrutinized. After obtaining his visa, Atta took a bus on June 2, from Hamburg to Prague where he stayed overnight before traveling on to the United States the next day. Bin al-Shibh later explained that they believed it would contribute to operational security for Atta to fly out of Prague instead of Hamburg, where he traveled from previously. Likewise, al-Shehhi traveled from a different location, in his case via Brussels.

On June 6, 2002, ABC's World News Tonight broadcast an interview with Johnelle Bryant, former loan officer at the U.S. Department of Agriculture in south Florida, who told about her encounter with Mohamed Atta. This encounter took place "around the third week of April to the third week of May of 2000", before Atta's official entry date into the United States (see below). According to Bryant, Atta wanted to finance the purchase of a crop-duster. "He wanted to finance a twin-engine, six-passenger aircraft and remove the seats," Bryant told ABC's World News Tonight. He insisted that she write his name as ATTA, that he originally was from Egypt but had moved to Afghanistan, that he was an engineer and that his dream was to go to a flight school. He asked about the Pentagon and the White House. He said he wanted to visit the World Trade Center and asked Bryant about the security there. He mentioned al-Qaeda and said the organization "could use memberships from Americans". He mentioned Osama bin Laden and said "this man would someday be known as the world's greatest leader." Bryant said "the picture that came out in the newspaper, that's exactly what that man looked like." Bryant contacted the authorities after recognising Atta in news reports. Law enforcement officials said Bryant passed a lie-detector exam.

According to official reports, Atta flew from Prague to Newark International Airport, arriving on June 3, 2000. That month, Atta and al-Shehhi stayed in hotels and rented rooms in New York City on a short-term basis. Jarrah had arrived in the United States on June 27, 2000, after his flight landed at Newark, New Jersey, and Jarrah had decided to go with al-Shehhi and Atta to search for different flight schools in the US. They continued to inquire about flight schools and personally visited some, including Airman Flight School in Norman, Oklahoma, which they visited on July 3, 2000. Days later, al-Shehhi, Jarrah and Atta ended up in Venice, Florida. Atta and al-Shehhi established accounts at SunTrust Bank and received wire transfers from Ali Abdul Aziz Ali, Khalid Sheikh Mohammed's nephew in the United Arab Emirates. On July 6, 2000, Atta, Jarrah and al-Shehhi enrolled at Huffman Aviation in Venice, where they entered the Accelerated Pilot Program. When Atta and al-Shehhi arrived in Florida, they initially stayed with Huffman's bookkeeper and his wife in a spare room of their house. After a week, they were asked to leave because they were rude. Atta and al-Shehhi then moved into a small house nearby in Nokomis where they stayed for six months.

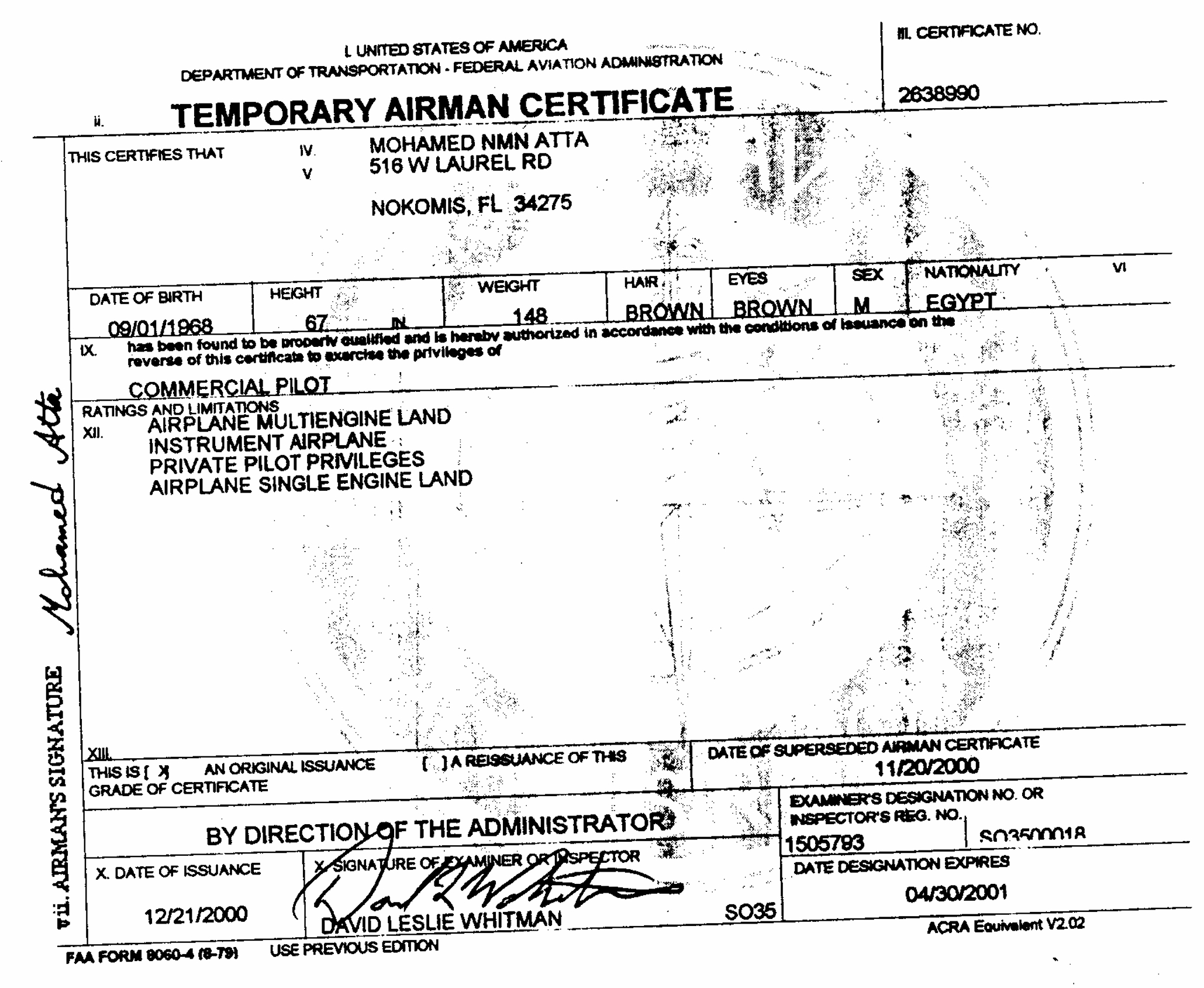
Mohamed Atta's FAA Temporary Airman Certificate, issued December 21, 2000

Atta began flight training on July 6, 2000, and continued training nearly every day. By the end of July, both Atta and al-Shehhi did solo flights. Atta earned his private pilot certificate in September, and then he and al-Shehhi decided to switch flight schools. Both enrolled at Jones Aviation in Sarasota and took training there for a brief time. They had problems following instructions and were both very upset when they failed their Stage 1 exam. They inquired about multi-engine planes and told the instructor that "they wanted to move quickly, because they had a job waiting in their country upon completion of their training in the U.S." In mid-October, Atta and al-Shehhi returned to Huffman Aviation to continue training. In November 2000, Atta earned his instrument rating, and then a commercial pilot's license in December from the Federal Aviation Administration.

Atta continued with flight training that included solo flights and simulator time. On December 22, Atta and al-Shehhi applied to Eagle International for large jet and simulator training for McDonnell Douglas DC-9 and Boeing 737-300 models. On December 26, Atta and al-Shehhi needed a tow for their rented Piper Cherokee on a taxiway of Miami International Airport after the engine shut down. On December 29 and 30, Atta and al-Shehhi went to the Opa-locka Airport where they practiced on a Boeing 727 simulator, and they obtained Boeing 767 simulator training from Pan Am International on December 31. Atta purchased cockpit videos for Boeing 747-200, Boeing 757-200, Airbus A320 and Boeing 767-300ER models via mail-order from Sporty's Pilot Shop in Batavia, Ohio, in November and December 2000.

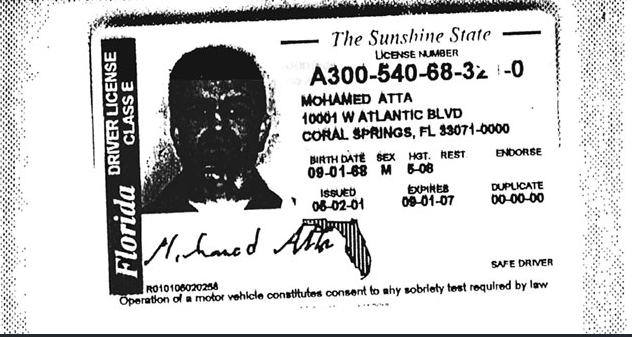
Mohamed Atta's Florida license record and license card

Records on Atta's cellphone indicated that he phoned the Moroccan embassy in Washington, D.C. on January 2, 2001, just before al-Shehhi flew to the country. Atta flew to Spain two days later, on January 4, to coordinate with bin al-Shibh, and returned to the United States on January 10. He then traveled to Lawrenceville, Georgia, where he and al-Shehhi visited an LA Fitness Health Club. During that time Atta flew out of Briscoe Field in Lawrenceville with a pilot, and Atta and either the pilot or al-Shehhi flew around the Atlanta area.

On April 11, Atta and al-Shehhi rented an apartment at 10001 Atlantic Blvd, Apt. 122 in Coral Springs, Florida, for $840 per month, and assisted with the arrival of the muscle hijackers. On April 16, Atta was given a citation for not having a valid driver's license, and he began steps to acquire one. On May 2, Atta received his driver's license in Lauderdale Lakes, Florida. While in the United States, Atta owned a red 1989 Pontiac Grand Prix. On May 11, Atta visited Logan International Airport in Boston with another man, and the two spent 45 minutes recording video and taking photos of security checkpoints. Airport employees became suspicious of two persons and they alarmed security, but this was ignored. One technical worker complained about Atta's behavior and spoke to him, causing Atta and his companion to nervously pack up their bags and race to another checkpoint.

On June 27, Atta flew from Fort Lauderdale to Boston, Massachusetts, where he spent a day, and then continued to San Francisco for a short time, and from there to Las Vegas. On June 28, Atta arrived at McCarran International Airport in Las Vegas to meet with the three other pilots. He rented a Chevrolet Malibu from an Alamo Rent a Car agency. It is not known where he stayed that night, but on the 29th he registered at the Econo Lodge at 1150 South Las Vegas Boulevard. Here he presented an AAA membership for a discount, and paid cash for the $49.50/night room. During his trip to Las Vegas, he is thought to have used a video camera that he had rented from a Select Photo outlet back in Delray Beach, Florida.

FBI operative Elie Assaad became suspicious of Atta in early 2001 as he was supposedly seen with al-Qaeda fugitive Adnan Shukrijumah.

=== July 2001 summit in Spain ===
In July 2001, Atta again left for Spain in order to meet with bin al-Shibh for the last time. On July 7, 2001, Atta flew on Swissair Flight 117 from Miami to Zurich, where he had a stopover. On July 8, Atta was recorded on surveillance video when he withdrew 1700 Swiss francs from an ATM. He used his credit card to purchase two Swiss Army knives and some chocolate in a shop at the Zurich Airport. After the stopover in Zürich, he arrived in Madrid at 4:45 pm on Swissair Flight 656, and spent several hours at the airport. Then at 8:50 pm, he checked into the Hotel Diana Cazadora in Barajas, a neighborhood near the airport. That night and twice the next morning, he called Bashar Ahmad Ali Musleh, a Jordanian student in Hamburg who served as a liaison for bin al-Shibh.

On the morning of July 9, Mohamed Atta rented a silver Hyundai Accent, which he booked from SIXT Rent-A-Car for July 9 to 16, and later extended to the 19th. He drove east out of Madrid towards the Mediterranean beach area of Tarragona. On the way, Atta stopped in Reus to pick up Ramzi bin al-Shibh at the airport. They drove to Cambrils, where they spent a night at the Hotel Mònica. They checked out the next morning, and spent the next few days at an unknown location in Tarragona. The absence of other hotel stays, signed receipts or credit card stubs has led investigators to believe that the men may have met in a safe house provided by other al-Qaeda operatives in Spain. There, Atta and bin al-Shibh held a meeting to complete the planning of the attacks. Several clues have been found to link their stay in Spain to Syrian-born Imad Eddin Barakat Yarkas (Abu Dahdah), and Amer el Azizi, a Moroccan in Spain. They may have helped arrange and host the meeting in Tarragona. Yosri Fouda, who interviewed bin al-Shibh and Khalid Sheikh Mohammed (KSM) before the arrest, believes that Said Bahaji and KSM may have also been present at the meeting. Spanish investigators have said that Marwan al-Shehhi and two others later joined the meeting. Bin al-Shibh would not discuss this meeting with Fouda.

During the meetings in Spain, Atta and bin al-Shibh had coordinated the details of the attacks. The 9/11 Commission obtained details about the meeting, based on interrogations of bin al-Shibh in the weeks after his arrest in September 2002. Bin al-Shibh explained that he passed along instructions from Osama bin Laden, including his desire for the attacks to be carried out as soon as possible. Bin Laden was concerned about having so many operatives in the United States. Atta confirmed that all the muscle hijackers had arrived in the United States, without any problems, but said that he needed five to six more weeks to work out details. Bin Laden also asked that other operatives not be informed of the specific date until the last minute. During the meeting, Atta and bin al-Shibh also decided on the targets to be hit, ruling out a strike on a nuclear plant. Bin al-Shibh passed along bin Laden's list of targets; bin Laden wanted the United States Capitol, the Pentagon, and the World Trade Center to be attacked, as they were deemed "symbols of America." If any of the hijackers could not reach their intended targets, Atta said, they were to crash the plane. They also discussed the personal difficulties Atta was having with fellow hijacker Ziad Jarrah. Bin al-Shibh was worried that Jarrah might even abandon the plan. The 9/11 Commission Report speculated that the now-convicted terrorist conspirator Zacarias Moussaoui was being trained as a possible replacement for Jarrah. Khalid Sheikh Mohammed claimed that Moussaoui was being trained for a second wave of attacks that never came to fruition.

From July 13 to 16, Atta stayed at the Hotel Sant Jordi in Tarragona. After bin al-Shibh returned to Germany on July 16, 2001, Atta had three more days in Spain. He spent two nights in Salou at the beachside Casablanca Playa Hotel, then spent the last two nights at the Hotel Residencia Montsant. On July 19, Atta returned to the United States, flying on Delta Air Lines from Madrid to Fort Lauderdale, via Atlanta.

=== Final plans in the U.S. ===
On July 22, 2001, Atta rented a Mitsubishi Galant from Alamo Rent a Car, putting 3,836 miles (6,173 km) on the vehicle before returning it on July 26. On July 25, Atta dropped Ziad Jarrah off at Miami International Airport for a flight back to Germany. On July 26, Atta traveled via Continental Airlines to Newark, New Jersey, checked into the Kings Inn Hotel in Wayne, New Jersey, and stayed there until July 30 when he took a flight from Newark back to Fort Lauderdale.

On August 4, Atta is believed to have been at Orlando International Airport waiting to pick up suspected "20th Hijacker" Mohammed al-Qahtani from Dubai, who ended up being held by immigration as "suspicious." Atta was believed to have used a payphone at the airport to phone a number "linked to al-Qaeda" after Qahtani was denied entry.

On August 6, Atta and al-Shehhi rented a white, four-door 1995 Ford Escort from Warrick's Rent-A-Car, which was returned on August 13. On August 6, Atta booked a flight on Spirit Airlines from Fort Lauderdale to Newark, leaving on August 7 and returning on August 9. The reservation was not used and canceled on August 9 with the reason "Family Medical Emergency". Instead, he went to Central Office & Travel in Pompano Beach to purchase a ticket for a flight to Newark, leaving on the evening of August 7 and scheduled to return in the evening on August 9. Atta did not take the return flight. On August 7, Atta checked into the Wayne Inn in Wayne, New Jersey and checked out on August 9. The same day, he booked a one-way first-class ticket via the Internet on America West Flight 244 from Ronald Reagan Washington National Airport to Las Vegas. Atta traveled twice to Las Vegas on "surveillance flights" rehearsing how the 9/11 attacks would be carried out. Other hijackers traveled to Las Vegas at different times in the summer of 2001.

Throughout the summer, Atta met with Nawaf al-Hazmi to discuss the status of the operation on a monthly basis.

On August 23, Atta's driver license was revoked in absentia after he failed to show up in traffic court to answer the earlier citation for driving without a license. The same day, the Mossad gave his name to the CIA as one of 19 belonging to US residents suspected of planning an imminent attack against the United States; only four of the names are publicly known, the others belonging to fellow 9/11 hijackers Marwan al-Shehhi, Nawaf al-Hazmi, and Khalid al-Mihdhar. It is not known if the 19 names were all those of the hijackers who would carry out the 9/11 attacks or if the list length is just a coincidence.

== 9/11 attacks and death ==
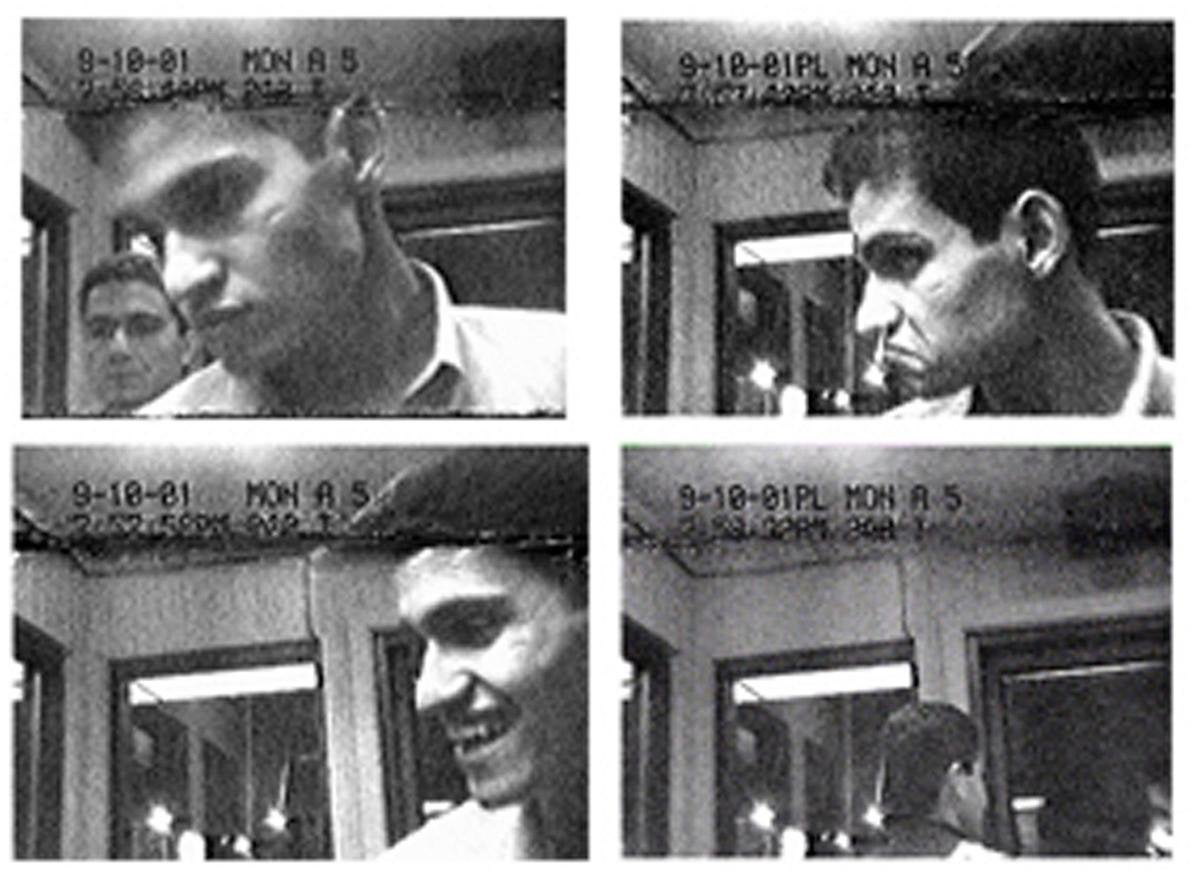
Abdulaziz al-Omari (foreground) and Atta (background) at an ATM in South Portland, Maine at 8:41 p.m. on September 10, 2001

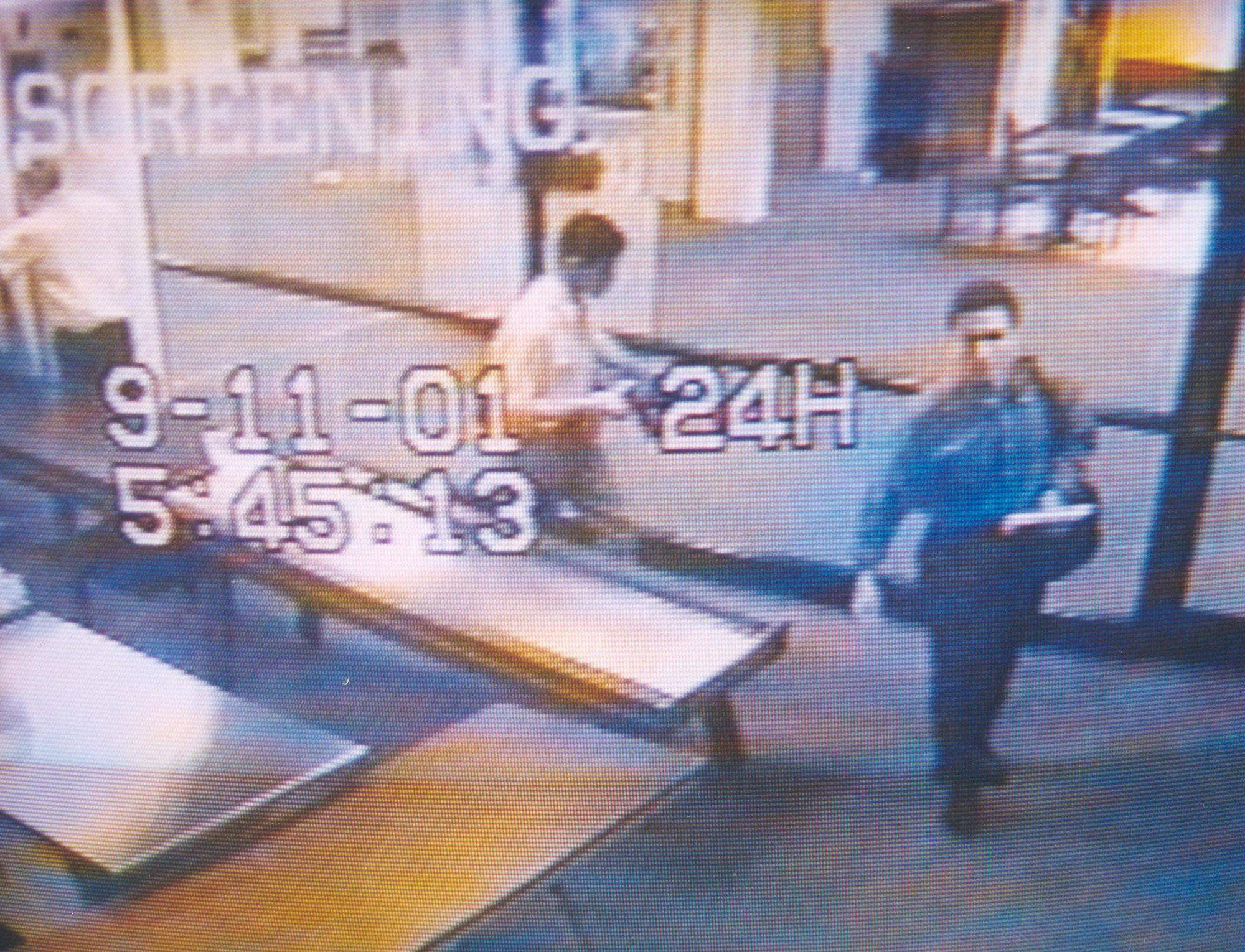
Atta (blue shirt) and al-Omari in the Portland International Jetport in Portland, Maine, on the morning of September 11, 2001

On September 10, 2001, Atta picked up al-Omari from the Milner Hotel in Boston, Massachusetts, and the two drove their rented Nissan Altima to a Comfort Inn in South Portland, Maine. While in South Portland, they were seen making two ATM withdrawals and stopping at Wal-Mart. The FBI also reported that two Middle-Eastern men were seen in the parking lot of a Pizza Hut, where Atta is known to have eaten that day.

Atta and al-Omari arrived early the next morning, at 5:40 a.m., at the Portland International Jetport, where they left their rental car in the parking lot and at 6:00 a.m. boarded a Colgan Air (US Airways Express) BE-1900C flight to Logan International Airport in Boston. In Portland, Mohamed Atta was selected by the Computer-Assisted Passenger Prescreening System (CAPPS), which required his checked bags to undergo extra screening for explosives but involved no extra screening at the passenger security checkpoint.

The connection between the two flights at Logan International Airport was within Terminal B, but the two gates were not connected within security. Passengers must leave the secured area, go outdoors, cross a covered roadway, and enter another building before going through security once again. There are two separate concourses in Terminal B; the south concourse was mainly used by US Airways and the north one was mostly used by American Airlines. It had been overlooked that there would still be a security screen to pass in Boston because of this distinct detail of the terminal's arrangement. A ticket staffer at Portland Airport reported becoming uneasy with Atta's anger upon being told of the additional screening requirements in Boston, but that he did not act on his suspicions after becoming concerned that he was racially profiling Atta. At 6:45 a.m., while at the Boston airport, Atta took a call from Flight 175 hijacker Marwan al-Shehhi. This call was apparently to confirm that the attacks were ready to begin. Atta checked in for American Airlines Flight 11, passed through security again, and boarded the flight. Atta was seated in business class, in seat 8D. At 7:59 a.m., the plane departed from Boston to Los Angeles International Airport, carrying 81 passengers.

Mohamed Atta at 08:24
Mohamed Atta's first announcement, heard by ATC at 08:24:38

Mohamed Atta at 08:33
Mohamed Atta's second announcement at 08:33:59

The hijacking began fifteen minutes into the flight at approximately 8:14 a.m., (Note: Although the 9/11 Commission estimated the hijacking to have commenced at 8:14 a.m., the pilots had stopped responding to ATC by 8:13:47, implying the hijacking may have occurred slightly earlier.) when beverage service would be starting. As this was happening, the pilots stopped responding to air traffic control and the aircraft began deviating from its assigned route; the plane's transponder was switched off several minutes later at 8:21 a.m. The pilots of United Airlines Flight 175 picked up on a suspicious transmission while leaving the runway around the same time Flight 11 was being hijacked, reportedly hearing the words, "Everyone, stay in your seats." Investigators later determined that this communication was made from the cockpit of Flight 11. This transmission was never heard by ATC, but the context suggests Atta was the one speaking. On the phone with American Airlines after the hijackers had assumed control of the plane, flight attendant Betty Ong reported that the cockpit was unresponsive and inaccessible.

At 8:24:38 a.m., a voice believed to be Atta's was heard by air traffic controllers, saying: "We have some planes. Just stay quiet and you will be OK. We are returning to the airport." Evidently, he tried to deliver a message over the cabin's PA system instructing the passengers and crew to stay put, but pressed the wrong switch and thereby tipped off ATC that the flight had been hijacked. (Note: 9/11 Commission investigator Miles Kara does not subscribe to the belief that Atta mistakenly keyed the mic and "accidentally" broadcast his message; Kara suggests that Atta was, in part, attempting to sow confusion within the FAA, and was delivering a message to Marwan al-Shehhi on United Airlines Flight 175. Kara suggests that the hijackers would have known that passengers likely could monitor cockpit communications on Channel 9 of United's onboard entertainment system. Because both Flight 11 and Flight 175 departed on cross-country routes approximately at the same time, Kara explains the hijackers could feel confident that the two cockpits would be using the same radio frequency during the first minutes after takeoff. Under that scenario, Atta's "We have some planes" remark could be viewed as a signal to al-Shehhi that their plan was working and that the Flight 175 group should execute its piece of the attack. Although it is unknown whether al-Shehhi heard Atta's comment or was listening to Channel 9, Kara considers it likely. One piece of evidence he cites is the fact that al-Shehhi waited to initiate the hijacking until after Flight 175 had crossed into the airspace of a different air traffic control center. Kara believes that al-Shehhi knew the crossover took place because he heard the Flight 175 pilots say so. If that was the case, he also would have heard the earlier transmissions from Atta that were picked up in the cockpit of Flight 175 and reported later to air traffic control. Separately, John Farmer, senior counsel to the 9/11 Commission, raised questions about whether the sequence of the hijackings, in which two United flights were hijacked after American flights, might have been influenced by the terrorists' hope to use United Channel 9 to gather real-time intelligence on the other hijackings.) Seconds later he transmitted another message: "Nobody move, everything will be OK. If you try to make any moves you'll endanger yourself and the airplane. Just stay quiet." About a minute later, he turned the plane southbound, on a course pointed in the direction of New York City. Atta was not heard from again for nine minutes until 8:33:59 when he transmitted, "Nobody move, please. We are going back to the airport. Don't try to make any stupid moves." This was the last transmission from Flight 11.

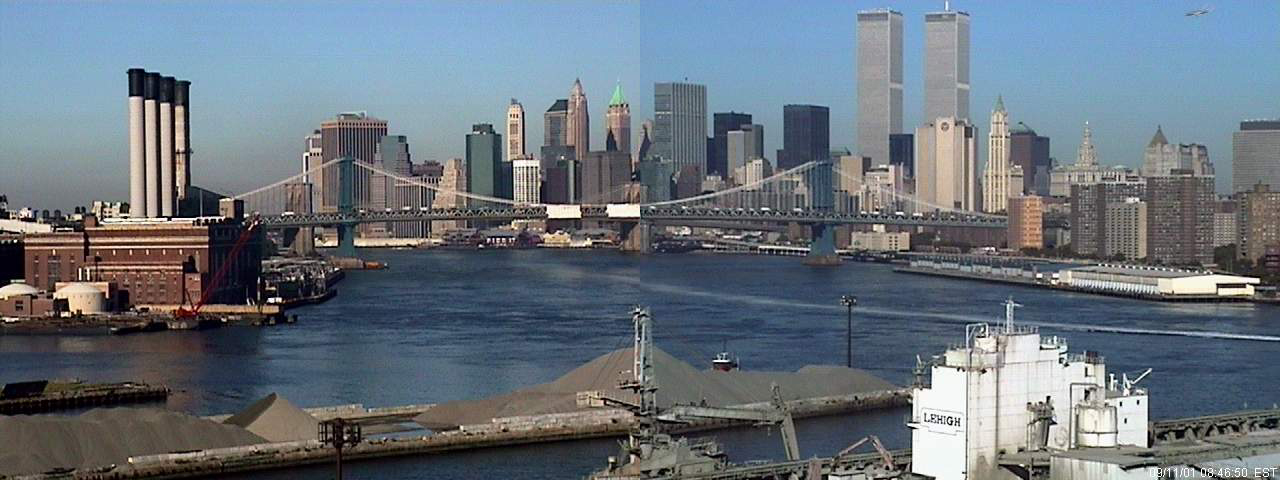
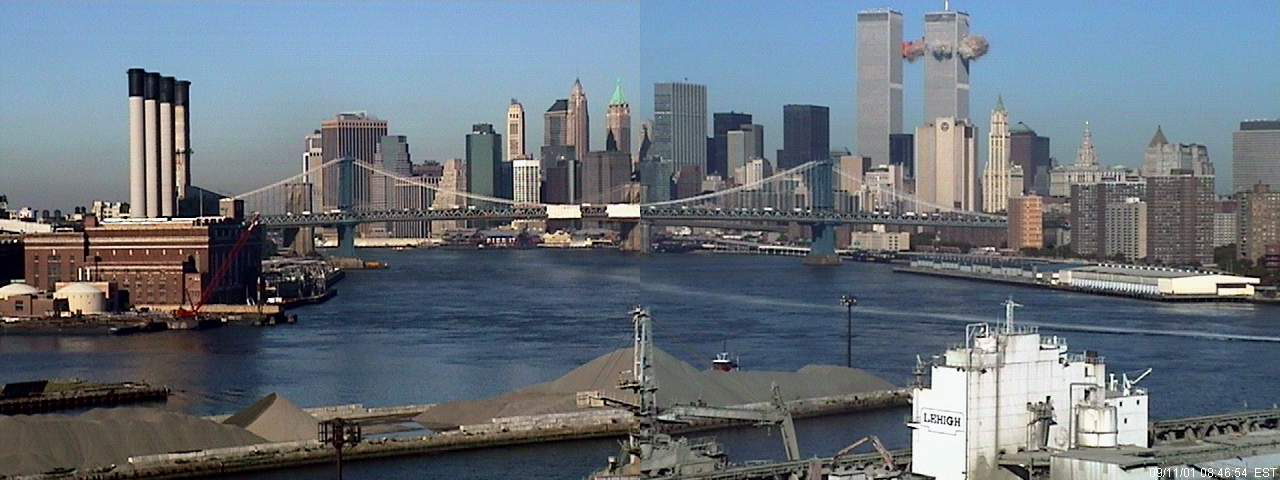
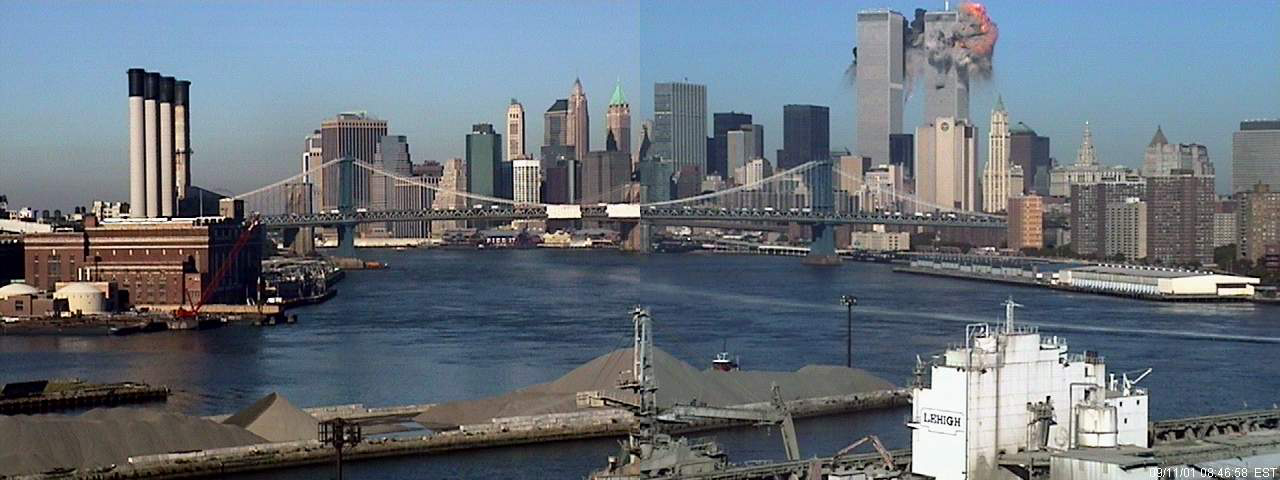
At 8:46, Mohamed Atta crashed Flight 11 into the North Tower, the approach and subsequent explosion of the crash was captured in frames by two automatic cameras set up in Brooklyn.

Twelve minutes later, at 8:46:40 a.m., Atta crashed the plane into the North Tower of the World Trade Center in New York City between floors 93 and 99, killing himself and everyone else aboard the plane. Hundreds more inside the North Tower were killed instantly. The damage from the impact severed all escape routes from floors 92 and higher, trapping more than 800 people on the upper floors of the building. No one above the 91st floor was able to make it out alive before the tower collapsed 102 minutes later at 10:28 a.m.

Because the flight from Portland to Boston had been delayed, Atta's luggage did not make it onto Flight 11. His bags, later recovered in Logan International Airport, contained airline uniforms, flight manuals, and a copy of Atta's will. A list of instructions, titled The Last Night was also found. This document is divided into three sections; the first is a fifteen-point list providing detailed instructions for the last night of a martyr's life, the second gives instructions for travelling to the plane and the third from the time between boarding the plane and martyrdom. Almost all of these points discuss spiritual preparation, such as prayer and citing religious scripture.

== Family reaction and denial ==
Atta's father vehemently rejected allegations his son was involved in the 9/11 attacks, and instead accused the Mossad and the United States government of having a hand in framing his son. Atta Sr. rejected media reports that stated his son was drinking wildly, and instead described his son as a quiet boy uninvolved with politics, shy and devoted to studying architecture. The elder Mr. Atta said he had spoken with Mohamed by phone the day after on September 12, 2001. He held interviews with the German news magazine Bild am Sonntag in late 2002, saying his son was alive and hiding in fear for his life, and that American Christians were responsible for the attacks. In an interview on September 24, 2001, Atta Sr. stated, "My son is gone. He is now with God. The Mossad killed him."

In 2021, on the 20th anniversary of the attacks, Atta's mother was interviewed by the Spanish online newspaper El Independiente. His mother, aged 79 at the time, denied her son's involvement in the attacks and said that she feels he is in Afghanistan.

== Mistaken identity ==
In the aftermath of the 9/11 attacks, the names of the hijackers were released. There was some confusion regarding who Mohamed Atta was, and cases of mistaken identity. Initially, Mohamed Atta's identity was confused with that of a native Jordanian, Mahmoud Mahmoud Atta, who bombed an Israeli bus in the West Bank in 1986, killing one and severely injuring three. Mahmoud Atta was 14 years older than Mohamed Atta. Mahmoud Atta, a naturalized U.S. citizen, was subsequently deported from Venezuela to the United States, extradited to Israel, tried, convicted, and sentenced to life in prison. The Israeli Supreme Court later overturned his extradition and set him free. After the attacks, there were also reports stating that Mohamed Atta had attended the International Officers School at Maxwell Air Force Base in Montgomery, Alabama. The Washington Post quoted a United States Air Force official who explained, "discrepancies in their biographical data, such as birth dates 20 years off, indicate we are probably not talking about the same people."

=== Prague controversy ===
In the months following the September 11 attacks, officials at the Czech Interior Ministry asserted that Atta made a trip to Prague on April 8, 2001, to meet with an Iraqi intelligence agent named Ahmed Khalil Ibrahim Samir al-Ani. This piece of information was passed on to the FBI as "unevaluated raw intelligence". Intelligence officials have concluded that such a meeting did not occur. A Pakistani businessman named Mohammed Atta had come to Prague from Saudi Arabia on May 31, 2000, with this second Atta possibly contributing to the confusion. The Egyptian Mohamed Atta arrived at the Florenc bus terminal in Prague, from Germany, on June 2, 2000. He left Prague the next day, flying on Czech Airlines to Newark, New Jersey, U.S. In the Czech Republic, some intelligence officials say the source of the purported meeting was an Arab informant who approached the Czech intelligence service with his sighting of Atta only after Atta's photograph had appeared in newspapers all over the world. United States and Czech intelligence officials have since concluded that the person seen with Ani was mistakenly identified as Atta, and the consensus of investigators is that Atta never attended a meeting in Prague.

=== Able Danger ===
In 2005, Army Lt. Col. Anthony Shaffer and Congressman Curt Weldon alleged that the Defense Department data mining project, Able Danger, produced a chart that identified Atta, along with Nawaf al-Hazmi, Khalid al-Mihdhar, and Marwan al-Shehhi, as members of a Brooklyn-based al-Qaeda cell in early 2000. Shaffer largely based his allegations on the recollections of Navy Captain Scott Phillpott, who later recanted his recollection, telling investigators that he was "convinced that Atta was not on the chart that we had." Phillpott said that Shaffer was "relying on my recollection 100 percent," and the Defense Department Inspector General's report indicated that Philpott "may have exaggerated knowing Atta's identity because he supported using Able Danger's techniques to fight terrorism."

Five witnesses who had worked on Able Danger and had been questioned by the Defense Department's Inspector General later told investigative journalists that their statements to the IG were distorted by investigators in the final IG's report, or the report omitted essential information that they had provided. The alleged distortions of the IG report centered around excluding any evidence that Able Danger had identified and tracked Atta years before 9/11.

== Assessment and motivation ==
There are multiple, conflicting interpretations of Atta's behavior and motivation. Political psychologist Jerrold Post has suggested that Atta and his fellow hijackers were just following orders from al-Qaeda leadership, "and whatever their destructive, charismatic leader Osama bin Laden said was the right thing to do for the sake of the cause was what they would do." American political scientist Robert Pape asserts that Atta was motivated by his commitment to the political cause, that he was psychologically normal, and that he was "not readily characterized as depressed, not unable to enjoy life, not detached from friends and society." By contrast, criminal justice professor Adam Lankford has found evidence that indicated Atta was suicidal, and that his struggles with social isolation, depression, guilt, shame, hopelessness, and rage were extraordinarily similar to the struggles of those who commit conventional suicide and murder–suicide. By this view, Atta's political and religious beliefs affected the method of his suicide and his choice of target, but they were not the underlying causes of his behavior.

On October 1, 2006, The Sunday Times released a video it had obtained "through a previously tested channel", purporting to show Mohamed Atta and Ziad Jarrah recording a martyrdom message at a training camp in Afghanistan. The video, bearing the date of January 18, 2000, is of good resolution but contains no sound track. Lip readers have failed to decipher it. Atta and Jarrah appear in high spirits, laughing and smiling in front of the camera. They had never been pictured together before. Unidentified sources from both al-Qaeda and the United States confirmed the video's authenticity. A separate section of the video shows Osama bin Laden addressing his followers at a complex near Kandahar. Ramzi bin al-Shibh is also identified in the video. According to The Sunday Times, "American and German investigators have struggled to find evidence of Atta's whereabouts in January 2000 after he disappeared from Hamburg. The hour-long tape places him in Afghanistan at a decisive moment in the development of the conspiracy when he was given operational command. Months later both he and Jarrah enrolled at flying schools in America."

== In popular culture ==
Canadian actor Elie Gemael portrayed Atta in the second episode of the BBC/Discovery docudrama Zero Hour, titled "The Last Hour of Flight 11".

Atta was the primary antagonist of the 2004 British-Canadian biographical docudrama film The Hamburg Cell, wherein he was portrayed by Egyptian-French actor Maral Kamel.

Martin Brodie portrayed Atta in The Path to 9/11, a 2006 ABC miniseries.

== See also ==
- PENTTBOM

== General and cited references ==
- The 9/11 Commission Report. W. W. Norton & Company. ISBN 0-393-32671-3.
- Burke, Jason (2003). Al-Qaeda: The True Story of Radical Islam (2006 revised ed.). New York: I. B. Tauris. ISBN 978-1-85043-666-9.
- Der Spiegel staff (2002). Inside 9-11: What Really Happened. Diane Pub Co. ISBN 0-312-98748-X.
- Corbin, Jan (2003). Al-Qaeda: In Search of the Terror Network that Threatens the Worlde. Nation Books. ISBN 1-56025-523-4.
- Fouda, Yosri; Fielding, Nick (2003). Masterminds of Terror. Arcade Publishing. ISBN 1-55970-717-8.
- Lankford, Adam (2013). The Myth of Martyrdom: What Really Drives Suicide Bombers, Rampage Shooters, and Other Self-Destructive Killers. Macmillan. ISBN 978-0-23-034213-2.
- McDermott, Terry (2005). Perfect Soldiers: The 9/11 Hijackers: Who They Were, Why They Did It. HarperCollins. ISBN 0-06-058469-6.
- Pape, Robert (2005). Dying to Win: The Strategic Logic of Suicide Terrorism. New York: Random House. ISBN 1-4000-6317-5.
- Rapoport, David C. (2006). Terrorism: Critical Concepts in Political Science. Taylor & Francis. ISBN 978-0-415-31654-5.
- Stein, Ruth (2010). For Love of the Father: A Psychoanalytic Study of Religious Terrorism. Stanford University Press. ISBN 978-0804763059.
- Wright, Lawrence (2006). The Looming Tower: Al-Qaeda and the Road to 9/11. Alfred A. Knopf. ISBN 978-0-375-41486-2.
