= Josh Meyer =

American author, screenwriter, lecturer, and reporter

Josh Meyer is an author, screenwriter, lecturer, and reporter. He has worked for various media and is currently with Politico.

== Education ==
According to his profile page at Politico, Meyer is from the Boston area and obtained Bachelor of Arts degrees with honors in 1987 from the University of Massachusetts Amherst in social thought and political economy as well as journalism.

== Career ==
He worked at the Los Angeles Times for twenty years until 2010 when he helped launch Medill School of Journalism's National Security Journalism Initiative in Washington, D.C., an effort to teach security journalism for the 21st century and digital platforms. He is the McCormick Lecturer in National Security Studies at Medill and leads the Medill National Security Reporting Project, an annual three-month post-graduate student national security project. He is also on the board of directors of Investigative Reporters and Editors, a professional association of investigative reporters.

In 2016, NBC News hired him as a senior investigative reporter. He has also been a correspondent for Quartz, an Atlantic Media online publication. He has also written for Reuters, Der Spiegel, The Boston Globe, and Salon. He has been a guest on NPR, BBC, PBS, and CNN.

In 2017 Meyer reported on actions taken by the Obama administration to prevent Hezbollah drug-trafficking activities from being closed down because of fears it would affect relations with Iran. An official spokesperson said he had relied on "low-level, ideological sources", but Meyer said he had "spent months of meticulous reporting" on the story.

Meyer co-authored The Hunt for KSM: Inside the Pursuit and Takedown of The Real 9/11 Mastermind, Khalid Sheikh Mohammed (2012) with Terry McDermott.

== Involvement with shows ==
He was a screenwriter and executive producer for the 2000 network TV crime thriller show Level 9 with mystery novelist Michael Connelly and consults on documentary films such as Morgan Spurlock's 2008 documentary Where in the World Is Osama bin Laden?.

He plays in the band Suspicious Package.
