= Level 9 (TV series) =

American science-fiction television series

- Level 9 cast
- Genre: Science fiction
- Created by: Michael Connelly; John Sacret Young
- Starring: Fab Filippo; Kate Hodge; Michael Kelly; Romany Malco; Max Martini; Kim Murphy; Susie Park; Esteban Powell; Tim Guinee
- Composer: Brian Tyler
- Country of origin: United States
- Original language: English
- No. of seasons: 1
- No. of episodes: 13 (3 unaired)

Production
- Executive producers: Michael Connelly; John Sacret Young; Josh Meyer; David Percelay
- Running time: 60 minutes
- Production companies: Sacret Productions; Paramount Television

Original release
- Network: UPN
- Release: October 27, 2000 – January 26, 2001

Level 9 is an American science-fiction television series created by Michael Connelly and Josh Meyer that was broadcast on UPN from October 27, 2000, until January 26, 2001.

== Plot ==
The series revolved around a secret agency within the government, staffed by government agents, tech-savvy geeks, and former criminal hackers, which is tasked with solving or preventing cyber crimes.

== Cast ==
- Fabrizio Filippo as Roland Travis, a former criminal hacker given a choice between prison and joining Level 9.
- Kate Hodge as Annie Price, the Level 9 team leader and a former FBI agent.
- Michael Joseph Kelly as Wilbert "Tibbs" Thibodeaux
- Romany Malco as Jerry Hooten, formerly with the United States Postal Inspection Service.
- Max Martini as Jack Wiley, an agent with the Defense Intelligence Agency (DIA), a former army ranger who studied cyber-ops before joining the team in the second episode.
- Kim Murphy as Margaret "Sosh" Perkins, born June 9, 1972, she was an internet model before she got into anti-cyber-crime.
- Susie Park as Joss Nakano
- Esteban Powell as Jargon, a few years ago he quit his high-school hacking club when they started getting into criminal hacking.
- Tim Guinee as Det. John Burrows, he works closely with Level 9 in first episode, but did not return. (Max Martini's character filling the same general role)
- Willie Garson as Bones, an expert on internet privacy and "big brother" who helps the team in the first two episodes.
- Miguel Sandoval as Santoro Goff, the agency director in Washington D.C., with oversight of Level 9.

== Production ==
Thirteen episodes were produced, ten of which were aired on UPN, before the program was canceled in January 2001 due to low ratings.

== Episodes ==
No.	Title	Directed by	Written by	Original release date	Prod. code
1	"Mail Call"	Robert Harmon	Michael Connelly & Josh Meyer	October 27, 2000	001
2	"DefCon"	John Sacret Young	Story by : Josh Meyer & Michael Connelly; Teleplay by : Josh Meyer	November 3, 2000	002
3	"Through the Looking Glass"	Vincent Misiano	Story by : Michael Connelly & Josh Meyer; Teleplay by : Michael Connelly	November 10, 2000	005
4	"Reboot"	Vincent Misiano	Peter M. Lenkov	November 17, 2000	003
5	"Digital Babylon"	Aaron Lipstadt	Story by : John Mankiewicz & Daniel Pyne; Teleplay by : Neil Ingram & Daniel Pyne	November 24, 2000	008
6	"Ten Little Hackers"	Aaron Lipstadt	Jordan Hawley & William Schifrin	December 1, 2000	004
7	"A Price to Pay"	Jeffrey Reiner	Story by : John Sacret Young & Jeannine Renshaw; Teleplay by : Jeannine Renshaw	December 8, 2000	006
8	"Eat Flaming Death"	Norberto Barba	Carla Kettner	December 15, 2000	007
9	"Wetware"	Goran Gajic	Peter M. Lenkov	January 19, 2001	009
10	"Avatar"	Whitney Ransick	Paul Guyot	January 26, 2001	010
11	"Goff Goes Home" "It's Magic"	John Sacret Young	Story by : John Sacret Young; Teleplay by : John Sacret Young & John Mankiewicz & Peter M. Lenkov & Jeannine Renshaw	Unaired	011
12	"The Programmer"	Sarah Pia Anderson	Robert Ward	Unaired	012
13	"Mob.com"	Aaron Lipstadt	Jordan Hawley & William Schifrin	Unaired	013

== Broadcast and syndication ==
In August 2006, the Sci-Fi Channel acquired rerun rights to the series which was added to their schedule in June 2007. Sci-Fi aired the episodes never shown by UPN in February 2008.

== Home media ==
On May 11, 2018, Visual Entertainment released Level 9- The Complete Series on DVD in Region 1.

== Reception ==
On Rotten Tomatoes, the series has an aggregated score of 45% based on 5 positive and 6 negative critic reviews. The website’s consensus reads: "Though it fortunately never takes it high-tech premise too seriously, Level 9 features stilted performances and an overreliance on genre formula."
