= Mahmoud Mahmoud Atta =

American militant (born 1954)

- محمود محمود عطى
- Born: 1954 (age 71–72)
- Known for: Suspected to be responsible for a fatal 1986 bus bombing
- Status: Unknown
- Penalty: Life imprisonment

Mahmoud Mahmoud Atta (Arabic: محمود محمود عطى) (born 1954) is an American and alleged militant from the Palestine Liberation Organization who was suspected to be responsible for bombing a bus in 1986 on the West Bank, killing one and severely injuring three.

== Biography ==
Mahmoud Mahmoud Atta was born in Ramalla, Palestine in 1954. He was responsible for Abu Nidal clandestine terrorist operations in Central and South American countries, and was suspected of murdering a bus driver in a bombing of a bus in April 1986 in the West Bank. A naturalized US citizen, Mahmoud Atta arrived at Simon Bolivar Airport, Venezuela's main international airport in June 1987. He was coming from Mexico, and was being monitored by the DISIP Venezuelan Counterintelligence Service. From the airport, Atta took a taxi to the city of Valencia, State of Carabobo, Venezuela, where he had high level Abu Nidal official contacts. After seven days of surveillance and monitoring his calls, the apartment was raided by the DISIP commandos unit, and Atta was arrested, and transferred to Caracas, Venezuela.

With all the information collected by the surveillance, Atta was interrogated by the Venezuelan DISIP Counterintelligence Department. Venezuelan Counterintelligence officials found a false bottom in his suitcase, finding two false US passports, and letters hand-written by Atta. Addresses, telephone numbers, names, and countries of the Abu Nidal Terrorist Organization were found in the false bottom of his suitcase. Atta was deported by the government of Venezuela to the U.S. and arrested by the FBI. Atta was then extradited to Israel in 1990. In Israel, he was tried and sentenced to life in prison. The Israeli Supreme Court later invalidated his extradition and set him free.

== Mistaken identity and disappearance ==
Following the September 11 attacks in the United States, it was initially thought that Mahmoud Mahmoud Atta was one of the hijackers on board the first plane to hit the World Trade Center. This led to the harsh questioning of US immigration authorities and the intelligence community, because it was felt that they had failed to stop a known terrorist from entering the country under his true name. However, his identity was confused with the Egyptian militant leader Mohamed Atta who was actually on board the flight.

Mahmoud Mahmoud Atta's current whereabouts are unknown.

== See also ==
- List of people who disappeared mysteriously (2000–present)
