= Terry McDermott (journalist) =

American journalist

- Occupation: Journalist

Terry McDermott is an American journalist who served as a national correspondent with the Los Angeles Times and is author of Perfect Soldiers: The 9/11 Hijackers, Who They Were, Why They Did It, an investigative non-fiction book profiling the hijackers of the September 11 attacks in 2001 as well as the al-Qaeda leaders who planned and orchestrated the attacks. McDermott has claimed that Perfect Soldiers is the sole book among "more than ten thousand" books published about the 9/11 attacks which focuses entirely on the hijackers.

== Career ==
McDermott was a reporter for thirty years. As a reporter, he covered a number of topics such as county zoning boards, state legislatures, the culture of the Los Angeles Police Department, radical Islam, skyscrapers, the search for rare blood molecule, the California Dream, and coffee in Indonesia. Prior to his work as a reporter, he held jobs as a carpenter, a political campaign manager, and an interpreter of satellite reconnaissance imagery in the U.S. Air Force.

McDermott's research for Perfect Soldiers involved meeting and interviewing the families and former associates of the 9/11 hijackers. He has stated that the sparsity of books about the hijackers themselves is caused by a lack of available information about them; McDermott has cited the difficulty of locating and interviewing the relatives and other acquaintances of the hijackers in Saudi Arabia, Egypt, Pakistan and other countries.

Following the publication of Perfect Soldiers, McDermott has been interviewed in several documentaries on the 9/11 attacks and the Hamburg cell in general, including the History Channel documentary 9/11: Inside the Hamburg Cell and the National Geographic Channel documentaries Inside 9/11 (2005) and 9/10: The Final Hours.

== Personal ==
McDermott is a native of Iowa. He currently resides in southern California. He has a graduate degree in urban studies.

== Books ==
- Perfect Soldiers – The Hijackers: Who They Were, Why They Did It, was published by HarperCollins in 2005.
- 101 Theory Drive: A Scientist’s Pursuit of Memory Pantheon, April, 2010, paperback April 2011.
- The Hunt for KSM: Inside the Pursuit and Takedown of the Real 9/11 Mastermind – Khalid Sheikh Mohammed, co-authored by Josh Meyer, Little Brown March, 2012.
