= Perfect Soldiers (book) =

2005 book by Terry McDermott

- Cover of the first edition
- Author: Terry McDermott
- Language: English
- Subject: The 9/11 hijackers
- Publisher: HarperCollins
- Publication date: 2005
- Publication place: United States
- Media type: Print
- Pages: 330
- ISBN: 0-06-058469-6
- OCLC: 60034350
- Dewey Decimal: 303.6250922
- LC Class: HV6431 .M394 2005

Perfect Soldiers: The Hijackers: Who They Were, Why They Did It (also subtitled The 9/11 Hijackers: Who They Were, Why They Did It) is a 2005 book by journalist Terry McDermott. The book discusses the 9/11 hijackers, focusing on their backgrounds and what led them to commit the September 11 attacks. McDermott was an investigative reporter for the Los Angeles Times. Much of the book's information is taken from the hijackers' acquaintances, interviewed by McDermott, the 9/11 Commission Report, and other documentation. The book took three years for McDermott to write and research.

The book is split into three sections: the first covering the hijackers themselves, the second focusing on the political environment and background that shaped them, and the third focusing on the plot itself. Several appendixes include related documents, including Osama bin Laden's 1996 declaration of war against the US and the instructions left behind for the hijackers. Perfect Soldiers received a largely positive reception, with reviewers praising its research, writing, and insight into the hijackers. Several reviews called it a standout among the many books about 9/11.

== Background and publication history ==
Terry McDermott was a national correspondent and investigative reporter for the Los Angeles Times. He was formerly a writing coach and reporter for several other newspapers. The book took him three years to write and research. In researching for the book, McDermott interviewed several of the hijacker's acquaintances, from which much of the book's information is sourced from. Other information is taken from the 9/11 Commission Report, or FBI records and prior testimony.

Perfect Soldiers was first published by HarperCollins in 2005. Its first edition had 330 pages. Some prints were subtitled The Hijackers: Who They Were, Why They Did It, while other editions carried the subtitle The 9/11 Hijackers: Who They Were, Why They Did It.

== Contents ==
The book's title was taken from a quote from mystery writer Dashiell Hammett's novel The Dain Curse, included after the title page: "He was the perfect soldier: he went where you sent him stayed where you put him, and had no idea of his own to keep him from doing exactly what you told him."

In a preface, McDermott argues that the perpetrators of the September 11 attacks were "regrettably, I think, fairly ordinary men. I say this is regrettable because it was their ordinariness that makes it much more likely there are a great many more men just like them." He also says that while he predicts the book will upset people in its effort to understand the motivation of the terrorists, "a primary task — and great joy, too — of the journalist is to empathize, to try to understand the way the world appeared to the people being written about."

The book explains the rise of militant Islam and gives a background on al-Qaeda and its rise. Following a prologue, Perfect Soldiers is split into three parts: "Soldiers", "The Engineer", and "The Plot". "Soldiers" profiles the hijackers and their histories. Most of the book focuses on the hijackers, their time in Europe, and their radicalization at Hamburg's fundamentalist Al-Quds Mosque. Particular focus is given to three of the hijackers: Mohamed Atta, Ziad Jarrah, and Marwan al-Shehhi.

The second part covers the Soviet–Afghan War, the Taliban's rising success, and the background to the movements in the Muslim world that gave rise to al-Qaeda and Osama bin Laden. The third and final section covers the 9/11 plot itself. McDermott concludes that the attack was successful in part due to al-Qaeda's small size, and says the terrorists made numerous mistakes in planning the attack: "[Al-Qaeda] made mistakes all the time. It didn't get caught because the government with which it was dealing made more of them." The final chapter, "That Day", covers the timeline and events of the attack itself.

Following the main aspect of the book there are four appendixes included: Mohamed Atta's will, part of the instructions left behind for the hijackers, an abridged version of Osama bin Laden's 1996 declaration of war against the US, and his 1998 "Jihad Against Jews and Crusaders".

== Reception ==
Perfect Soldiers received a largely positive reception. John Gray for the New Statesman called Perfect Soldiers "a powerful narrative that presents the most convincing picture of the 9/11 hijackers to date", while Jonathan Yardley complimented it and described it as a "well-told, meticulously researched cautionary tale". Michiko Kakutani said the book gave "a new meaning to the phrase 'the banality of evil'", with "chilling portraits" of the attackers. Publishers Weekly praised the book's "clear rendering" of the hijacker's decision to die and the detailed biographies of them provided by McDermott. They further said that the book was worth the wait as the first "serious study" of the hijackers. Kirkus Reviews called it a "chilling, often depressing read that merits attention, if only for the other 'perfect soldiers' who may be waiting out there", but said that McDermott never actually answered the question of why the hijackers did the attack, other than "offering the standard bromide that they saw themselves as martyrs in a holy war". J. Peder Zane for The Sunday News and Observer said, given the details provided in the book, "one wonders whether wars costing thousands of lives and hundreds of billions of dollars was the best response to 9/11."

Several reviewers praised McDermott's research, and the book's writing and detail. Some reviews criticized the lack of information on the 15 of the hijackers who had joined the plot towards its end. A reviewer for The Sunday Oregonian said it was not perfect but was "very good" and the "definitive account"; he particularly praised his reporting on their radicalization in Hamburg but said it was unfortunate that McDermott could not find more information on the 15 other hijackers. Kakutani said the book's portrayals of the leaders Khalid Sheikh Mohammed and bin Laden were not more detailed than most newspaper or magazine reports. Zane said that the book did not answer all questions raised and said it was not fully able to determine why the men became violent due to a lack of hard evidence, but that "it suggests that it may be as dangerous to overestimate your enemies as it is to underestimate them". Tom Walker for The Denver Post praised McDermott's explanations of the political situation that shaped the hijackers.

Reviewers positively compared it to other books about 9/11, with several reviewers calling it a standout among the many books on the terrorist attack. Brian Michael Jenkins said though it would not be the last book on the topic, it was then the "very best available". David Garrow called it one of the best books about 9/11. Sharon Adam for The Jerusalem Post said the same, and that it was written with the "acumen of a fact-digging investigator". Adam praised it for giving an insight into the hijackers. Reviewer Andrew Armitage compared it to Ghost Wars by Steve Coll in its exploration of the world the hijackers inhabited and to the 9/11 Commission report itself but called Perfect Soldiers the "most comprehensive study yet", "combining a reporter’s sensibilities with a storyteller's skills".

Garrow saw the book's portrayal of Atta, the most well-known hijacker, as showing that despite him being the most prominent, he was actually the most unknowable of those profiled. He said what made the book memorable was the life stories of the hijackers, rather than his conclusions about the attacks themselves. The book was recommended in a review from the Marine Corps Gazette for those interested in Islamist tactics and U.S. Armed Forces personnel, with reviewer Youssef Aboul-Enein saying the work "dispels all preconceived notions of how an Islamist militant is supposed to behave before carrying out a suicide mission."
