= Timeline for the day of the September 11 attacks =

The September 11 attacks of 2001 were a unique act of terrorism, constituting a media event on a scale not seen since the advent of civilian global satellite links. Instant worldwide reaction and debate were made possible by round-the-clock television news organizations and by the Internet. As a result, most of the events were known by a large portion of the world's population as they occurred.

The attacks themselves lasted less than two hours; the first hijacking commenced at approximately 8:14 am, and the final hijacked plane crashed at 10:03 am. All times given are in Eastern Daylight Time, (UTC−04:00).

== Major events of 9/11/2001 ==
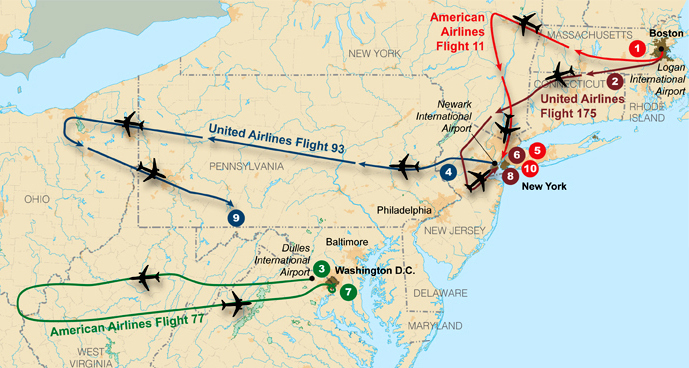
Flight paths of the four planes used on September 11

7:59 a.m.: American Airlines Flight 11, a Boeing 767 with registration number N334AA, carrying 76 passengers (excluding the hijackers) and 11 crew members, departs 14 minutes late from Logan International Airport in Boston, bound for Los Angeles International Airport. Five hijackers are on board. Hijacker and ringleader Mohamed Atta would pilot the plane into the North Tower of the World Trade Center.

8:14: United Airlines Flight 175, a Boeing 767, with registration number N612UA carrying 56 passengers (excluding the hijackers) and 9 crew members, departs 14 minutes late from Logan International Airport in Boston, bound for Los Angeles International Airport. Five hijackers are on board. Lead hijacker-pilot Marwan al-Shehhi would pilot the plane into the South Tower of the World Trade Center.

8:14: Flight 11 is hijacked over Central Massachusetts, turning first northwest, then south heading straight to New York.

8:20: American Airlines Flight 77, a Boeing 757 with registration number N644AA with 58 passengers (excluding the hijackers) and 6 crew members, departs 10 minutes late from Washington Dulles International Airport, for Los Angeles International Airport. Five hijackers are on board. Lead hijacker-pilot Hani Hanjour would pilot the plane into the West side of the Pentagon.

8:42–8:46 (approx.): Flight 175 is hijacked above northwest New Jersey, about 60 miles (100 km) northwest of New York City, continuing southwest briefly before turning back to the northeast. At this time estimate, Flight 11 is about to descend over New York and is just minutes away from crashing.

8:42: United Airlines Flight 93, a Boeing 757 with registration number N591UA with 37 passengers (excluding the hijackers) and 7 crew members, departs 42 minutes late from Newark International Airport (later Newark Liberty International Airport), bound for San Francisco International Airport. Four hijackers are on board. The lead hijacker-pilot is Ziad Jarrah. At this time, Flight 175 is being hijacked and Flight 11 is about to descend to New York and is 4 minutes away from crashing.

8:46:40: Flight 11 crashes into the north face of the North Tower (1 WTC) of the World Trade Center, between floors 93 and 99. All passengers aboard are instantly killed along with an unknown number inside the building. The aircraft enters the tower on impact.

8:51–8:54 (approx.): Flight 77 is hijacked above southern Ohio, turning to the southeast. The transponder is turned off by hijacker-pilot Hani Hanjour.

9:03:11: Flight 175 crashes into the south face of the South Tower (2 WTC) of the World Trade Center, between floors 77 and 85. All passengers and crew are killed together with an unknown number inside the building. Parts of the plane, including the starboard engine, leave the building from its east and north sides, falling to the ground six blocks away.

9:28: Flight 93 is hijacked above northern Ohio, turning to the southeast.

9:37:46: Flight 77 crashes into the western side of the Pentagon. All 58 passengers and crew were killed aboard the aircraft, as well as an additional 125 (including emergency workers) on the ground. The crash starts a violent fire.

9:45: United States airspace is shut down by the Federal Aviation Administration; all operating aircraft are ordered to land at the nearest airport, and international flights are not permitted into the airspace.

9:57: The passengers aboard Flight 93 begin a revolt, planned by Todd Beamer, Mark Bingham, Tom Burnett, Jeremy Glick, and others, moving against the hijackers in an attempt to take back the plane.

9:58:59: The South Tower of the World Trade Center collapses, 56 minutes after the impact of Flight 175. Impact speed of the plane is considered one of the likely factors of the shorter amount of time between impact and collapse than that of the North Tower.

10:03:11: Flight 93 is crashed by its hijackers as a result of fighting in the cockpit 80 miles (130 km) southeast of Pittsburgh in Somerset County, Pennsylvania. Later reports indicate that passengers had learned about the World Trade Center and Pentagon crashes and were resisting the hijackers. The 9/11 Commission believed that Flight 93's target was either the United States Capitol building or the White House in Washington, D.C. but Khalid Sheikh Mohammed claims that the United States Capitol was the main target.

10:15: All five stories of the Pentagon on the west side, where American 77 crashed, collapse due to the fire started by the crash.

10:28:25: The North Tower of the World Trade Center collapses 1 hour and 42 minutes after the impact of Flight 11. The Marriott Hotel, located at the base of the two towers, is also destroyed.

5:20:33 p.m.: The 47 story 7 World Trade Center collapses after debris from the collapse of WTC 1 hitting it earlier in the day cause fires that eventually weaken the core columns.

== Detailed timeline of events ==
=== 5:00 a.m. ===
5:01: Ziad Jarrah in Newark calls Marwan al-Shehhi in Boston; this call was most likely to confirm the hijackers were ready to carry out the attack.

5:33: Mohamed Atta and Abdulaziz al-Omari check out of their room at a Comfort Inn in South Portland, Maine, and leave the hotel to drive Atta's rental car to nearby Portland International Jetport.

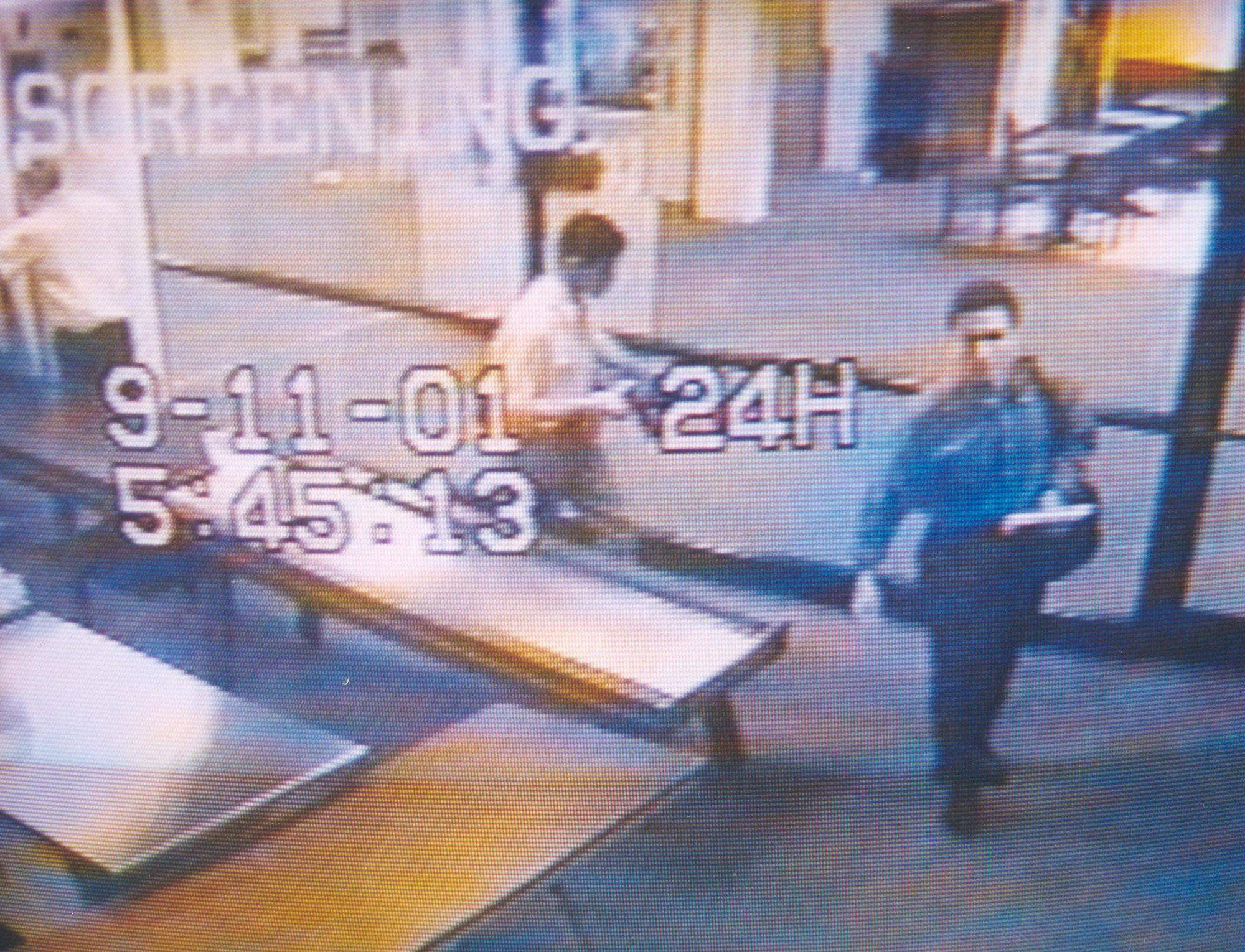
Mohamed Atta spotted on a security camera in the baggage screening area at Portland International Jetport

5:40: Atta and al-Omari arrive at Portland International Jetport.

5:43: Atta and al-Omari check in at the US Airways counter at Portland International Jetport, receiving their boarding passes for US Airways Express Flight 5930, operated by Colgan Air to Boston Logan International Airport in Massachusetts. Atta asks for their boarding passes for their connecting flight, American Airlines Flight 11 from Boston to Los Angeles International Airport, as well. Ticket agent Mike Tuohey informs Atta that the pair will need to check in again upon arrival in Boston to receive their second boarding passes. Tuohey would later recall that Atta appeared angry when told of this, leading him to briefly worry that the pair could be terrorists before they moved on.

5:45: Atta and al-Omari pass through security at Portland International Jetport, consisting of a walk-through metal detector and an X-ray screener for bags. Atta is randomly selected by the Computer-Assisted Passenger Prescreening System (CAPPS), requiring his checked bags to undergo extra screening for explosives, but does not receive any additional scrutiny himself.

=== 6:00 a.m. ===
6:00: Colgan Air Flight 5930 departs from Portland with Atta and al-Omari on board.

6:00: Polls open for primaries for the New York City mayoral elections, as well as other local offices.

6:15: Hamza al-Ghamdi and Ahmed al-Ghamdi arrive at Boston Logan International Airport by taxi, having stayed the night at a Days Inn in Brighton, Massachusetts.

6:20: The al-Ghamdi brothers check in at the United Airlines ticket counter for United Airlines Flight 175. Ahmed al-Ghamdi checks in two bags. Both men are confused by the standard security questions they were asked, but they received their boarding passes without incident.

6:22: Nawaf al-Hazmi and several men who have not been conclusively identified check out of the Residence Inn by Marriott in Herndon, Virginia.

6:31: President George W. Bush goes for an early-morning jog around the (now demolished) Colony Beach and Tennis Resort in Longboat Key, Florida, where he and his staff had spent the night.

6:31: Ahmed al-Ghamdi's two checked bags are loaded onto Flight 175.

6:45: Colgan Air Flight 5930 arrives at Logan International Airport, and Atta and al-Omari deplane. Separately, Satam al-Suqami, Waleed al-Shehri, and Wail al-Shehri arrive at Logan in their own rental car at the same time.

6:45: Al-Shehhi arrives at Logan International Airport and checks in for Flight 175. He checks in one bag.

6:48: Jarrah checks out of the Days Inn in Newark, New Jersey.

6:51: Al-Shehhi's checked bag is loaded onto Flight 175.

6:52: Al-Shehhi calls Atta's cell phone from a payphone in Logan's Terminal C to confirm that the plans for the attacks are set.

6:53: Fayez Banihammad and Mohand al-Shehri arrive at Logan International Airport and check in for Flight 175. Banihammad checks in two bags.

6:57: Banihammad's two checked bags are loaded onto Flight 175.

=== 7:00 a.m. ===
7:03–7:39: Jarrah and his hijacking team arrive at Newark International Airport (now Newark Liberty International Airport) and check in for United Airlines Flight 93.

7:15 (approx.): Khalid al-Mihdhar and Majed Moqed arrive at Washington Dulles International Airport and check-in for American Airlines Flight 77.

7:18: Al-Mihdhar and Moqed arrive at the security checkpoint at Washington Dulles International Airport. Both set off alarms and are consequently given a more thorough search.

7:23–7:28: Al-Shehhi and his hijacking team board Flight 175.

7:29 (approx.): Nawaf al-Hazmi and Salem al-Hazmi arrive at Washington Dulles International Airport and check-in for Flight 77.

7:31–7:40 (approx.): Atta and his hijacking team board Flight 11.

7:35: Hani Hanjour arrives at the security checkpoint at Washington Dulles International Airport. He passes through the checkpoint without suspicion or setting off any alarms.

7:36: The al-Hazmi brothers arrive at the security checkpoint at Washington Dulles International Airport. Salem does not set off any alarms. Nawaf does and is given a more thorough search. Security camera footage shows that Nawaf has an unidentified item in his back pocket.

7:39–7:48: Jarrah and his hijacking team board Flight 93.

7:46: Flight 11 is pushed back from Gate B32 at Logan International Airport.

7:50–7:55 (approx): Hanjour and his four fellow hijackers board Flight 77.

7:58: Flight 175 is pushed back from Gate C19 at Logan International Airport.

7:59: Flight 11, a Boeing 767 carrying 81 passengers and 11 crew members, departs 14 minutes late from Logan International Airport in Boston. Its destination is Los Angeles International Airport (LAX) in Los Angeles, California.

=== 8:00 a.m. ===
8:00: Flight 93 is pushed back from Gate A17 at Newark International Airport.

8:03: President Bush has his daily intelligence briefing. The material is routine, mostly concerning the Al-Aqsa Intifada and other Israeli-Palestinian issues. He calls Condoleezza Rice about one item, but there is no mention in the report of Osama bin Laden or al-Qaeda, nor are there any final warnings about the terrorist plot now actively in motion. The briefing lasts about twenty minutes, after which he says goodbye to the resort staff and departs in his motorcade. As the President's scheduled event is considered a garden variety trip to promote his education agenda, accompanied by low-level aides and reporters, Chief of Staff Andrew Card remarks to him "It should be an easy day."

8:05: Delta Air Lines Flight 1989 departs Boston for Los Angeles.

8:09: Flight 77 is pushed back from Gate D26 at Dulles International Airport.

8:13–8:20: Flight 11 is hijacked. Waleed and Wail al-Shehri rise from seats 2A and 2B and stab flight attendants Karen Martin and Barbara Arestegui. Atta rises from seat 8D, enters the cockpit, and stabs pilots John Ogonowski and Thomas McGuinness. Passenger Daniel Lewin rises from seat 9B and tries to stop Atta but is fatally stabbed by hijacker Satam al-Suqami, who sat in 10B. The hijackers also spray Mace in the first and business class cabins, forcing everyone in those sections to vacate to the back of the airplane. Flight attendant Madeline Amy Sweeney reports being shown a bomb by one of the hijackers.

8:13:35: Flight 11 has its last routine communication with the Federal Aviation Administration's (FAA's) Boston Air Route Traffic Control Center (hereinafter "Boston Center").

Boston Center: American 11, turn twenty degrees right.

Captain John Ogonowski: Turning right, American 11.

8:13:52: Boston Center Sector 46 controller Pete Zalewski instructs Flight 11 to climb to 35,000 feet twice, but receives no reply. He informs the Athens Sector controller that the flight is "NORDO" (no radio). Boston Center continues to attempt to re-establish contact with the flight without success.

8:14: Flight 175, another fully fueled Boeing 767, carrying 56 passengers and nine crew members, also departs from Logan International Airport in Boston; its destination is also Los Angeles International Airport. Five hijackers are aboard. One of them, most likely al-Shehhi, communicated with Mohamed Atta shortly before Flight 11's takeoff.

8:16: Flight 11 levels off at 29,000 feet and begins deviating from its assigned course.

8:17:59: A brief unknown sound (possibly a scream) from an unknown origin was heard over the frequency that Flight 11 and other nearby flights are using.

8:19: Betty Ong, a flight attendant on Flight 11, alerts an American Airlines reservations center in Cary, North Carolina, to the hijacking via an airphone. The following is the recorded portion of her conversation with agent Vanessa Minter, operator Winston Sadler, and supervisor Nydia Gonzalez:

Betty Ann Ong: Number three in the back. The cockpit's not answering. Somebody's stabbed in business class. And I think there's mace-that we can't breathe. I don't know. I think we're getting hijacked.

Reservations Operator Winston Sadler: Which flight are you on?

Ong: Flight 12 [sic].

Sadler: And what seat are you in? Ma'am, are you there?

Ong: Yes.

Sadler: What seat are you in?

Reservations Agent Vanessa Minter: Ma'am, what seat are you in?

Ong: We just left Boston. We're up in the air.

Sadler: I know. What-

Ong: We're supposed to go to LA and the cockpit's not answering their phone.

Minter: Okay, but what seat are you sitting in? What's the number of your seat?

Ong: Okay, I'm in my jump seat right now.

Sadler: Okay.

Ong: At 3R.

Sadler: Okay, you're the flight attendant? I'm sorry, did you say you're the flight attendant?

Ong: Hello?

Minter: Yes, hello.

Sadler: What is your name?

Ong: Hi. You're going to have to speak up, I can't hear you.

Sadler: Sure. What is your name?

Ong: Okay, my name is Betty Ong. I'm number three on Flight 11.

Sadler: Okay.

Ong: And the cockpit is not answering their phone. And there's somebody stabbed in business class. And there's, we can't breathe in business class, somebody's got Mace or something.

Sadler: Can you describe the person that you said-someone is what in business class?

Ong: I'm sitting in the back. Somebody is coming back from business. If you can hold on for one second.

Sadler: Sure.

Ong: They're coming back. They want to know who stabbed who? Do you know?

Unidentified flight attendant: I don't know, but Karen and [Amy?] got stabbed.

Ong: Okay, our number one is, got stabbed. Our purser's stabbed. Nobody knows who stabbed who, and we can't even get up to business class right now because nobody can breathe. Our number one is stabbed right now. And who else is-

Sadler: Okay, and do we-

Ong: And our number five. Our first class passengers are-first class, galley flight attendant, and our purser has been stabbed. And we can't get the cockpit, the door won't open. Hello?

Sadler: Yeah, I'm taking it down, all the information. We're also, of course, recording this. At this point-

Supervisor Nydia Gonzalez: This is Operations, what flight number are we talking about?

Sadler: Flight 12.

Gonzalez: Flight 12, okay-

Ong: No, we're on Flight 11 right now. This is Flight 11.

Sadler: It's Flight 11. I'm sorry, Nydia.

Ong: Boston to Los Angeles.

Sadler: Yes.

Ong: Our number one has been stabbed, and our five has been stabbed. Can anybody get up to the cockpit? Can anybody get up to the cockpit? Okay. We can't even get into the cockpit. We don't know who's up there.

Sadler: Well, if they were shrewd they would keep the door closed and-

Ong: I'm sorry?

Sadler: Would they not main-cockpit?

Ong: I think the guys are up there. They might have gone there-jammed the way up there or something. Nobody can call the cockpit, we can't even get inside. Is anybody still there?

Sadler: Yes, we're still here.

Ong: Okay, I'm staying on the line as well.

Sadler: Okay.

Gonzalez: Hi, who is calling Reservations? Is this one of the flight attendants? Or, who are you, hon?

Sadler: She gave her name as Betty Ong.

Gonzalez: Betty-

Ong: Yeah, I'm number three. I'm number three on this flight, and we are the first-

Gonzalez: You are number three on the flight?

Ong: Yes, and I have-

Gonzalez: And this is Flight 11? From where to where?

Ong: Flight 11

Gonzalez: Have you guys called anyone else?

Ong: No. Somebody's calling medical, and we can't get a doc-

While on the phone with Ong, Gonzalez calls the American Airlines System Operations Control (SOC) in Ft. Worth, Texas, and relays information about her call with Ong to the SOC's manager, Craig Marquis.

8:19: Flight 175 makes contact with Boston Center.

8:20: An American Airlines dispatcher receives a communication from a flight informing them that air traffic control had asked it to try and contact Flight 11.

8:20: Flight 77, a Boeing 757 with 58 passengers and six crew members, departs from Washington Dulles International Airport, for Los Angeles International Airport. Five hijackers are aboard.

8:21: Flight 11's transponder signal is turned off, but the flight can still be tracked via primary radar by Boston Center; (Note: With its transponder off, it is possible, though more difficult, to track an aircraft by its primary radar returns. But unlike transponder data, primary radar returns do not show the aircraft's identity and altitude.) prior to the 9/11 Commission's report, news organizations reported this time as 8:13 or immediately thereafter.

8:22: Flight 11 flight attendant Amy Sweeney attempts to call the American Airlines Flight Service Office at Logan International Airport but cannot get through.

8:23: A text message is sent to Flight 11 via the Aircraft Communication Addressing and Reporting System (ACARS): "Good morning, ATC looking for you on 135.32." Flight 11 does not reply.

Mohamed Atta's first and second announcements heard by ATC to Boston Center at 08:24.

8:24: It is believed Atta mistakenly held a button directing his voice to radio rather than to the plane's cabin as he intended, this leads Boston Center flight controllers to conclude that Flight 11 has probably been hijacked. The following is the relay of Atta's first two transmissions to the Boston Center:

Boston Center: Is that American 11 trying to call?

Mohamed Atta: (indistinct voice) Nobody.

Boston Center: What?

Atta: We have some planes. Just stay quiet and we'll be okay. We are returning to the airport.

Boston Center: And, uh, who is trying to call me, here? American 11 are you trying to call?

Atta: Nobody move, everything will be okay. If you try to make any moves, you'll endanger yourself and the airplane. Just stay quiet.

8:24: Flight 11 flight attendant Amy Sweeney attempts to call the American Airlines Flight Service Office at Logan International Airport again but cannot get through.

8:25–8:32: Boston Center notifies its chain of command of Flight 11's hijacking.

8:25: Another text message is sent to Flight 11 via ACARS: "Please contact Boston Center ASAP. They have lost radio contact and your transponder signal." Flight 11 does not reply.

8:25: Flight 11 flight attendant Amy Sweeney attempts to call the American Airlines Flight Service Office at Logan International Airport a third time. This time, she is able to get through and tells the employee who answers that someone is hurt on Flight 12 before the call is cut off. After the call, the office manager, Michael Woodward, goes to the American Airlines gate area and learns that Flight 12 is a flight from the West Coast to Boston that hasn't taken off yet.

8:26:30: Flight 11 makes a 100-degree turn to the south, following the Hudson River toward New York City.

8:28: Boston Center notifies the FAA's Air Traffic Control System Command Center in Herndon, Virginia (hereinafter "Herndon Command Center") of Flight 11's hijacking.

8:29: An air traffic control specialist at the American Airlines (SOC) in Ft. Worth, Texas, calls Boston Center to ask about the status of Flight 11. A controller at Boston Center told the specialist that the last known altitude of the aircraft was below 29,000 feet and that "He [Flight 11] was heading west. But right now he's pointed southwest of Albany." The controller the also said the transponder had been lost and that "the controller heard a threat in background, but that's unconfirmed and we're trying to pull the tape at this time."

8:29:24: Boston Center alerts the neighboring Cleveland and New York ARTCCs regarding Flight 11. The flight's position is estimated to be fifteen miles (24 km) southwest of Albany. The North American Aerospace Defense Command (NORAD) is not yet alerted.

Sometime between 8:30 and 8:45: American Airlines executive vice president Gerard Arpey makes a routine call to the airline's SOC and learns that personnel at the SOC are on the phone with a flight attendant who is reporting violence and a cockpit intrusion on one of the airline's flights. After the call, he tries unsuccessfully to contact American Airlines chairman Don Carty to inform him of the situation and goes to the SOC where he learns that colleagues are setting up the airline's System Operations Command Center (SOCC) in order to manage the emergency.

8:32: After receiving information about Flight 11's hijacking from Boston Center, the FAA's Herndon Command Center notifies FAA Headquarters.

8:32: Flight 11 flight attendant Amy Sweeney calls the American Airlines Flight Service Office at Logan International Airport a final time. The office manager, Michael Woodward, takes over the call. She tells him that she is sitting in the back of the aircraft next to Betty Ong; the plane has been hijacked; a man in first class has had his throat slashed; two flight attendants have been stabbed - one flight attendant has been stabbed seriously and is on oxygen while another flight attendant's wounds are not as serious and seems to be okay; a doctor has been paged; the flight attendants are unable to contact the cockpit; and there is a bomb in the cockpit. She also tells him that she and Ong are trying to relay as much information to the ground as possible.

8:33: The manager at the American Airlines SOC, Craig Marquis, receives a report from an SOC air traffic control specialist, who has just completed a call with Boston Center, that Flight 11 is at "29,000 feet. They've lost Comm [communications] with 'em. Turned off his transponder. Tracking his primary only. Was westbound. Turned southbound. Said the controller heard on the frequency the pilot apparently adjust his mike-lot of loud voices-that sounded threatening-something about return or I'll kill ya or something to that effect-or threatening dialogue." This leads American Airlines Headquarters to conclude that Flight 11 has probably been hijacked.

8:33: Flight 175 reaches its assigned cruising altitude of 31,000 feet.

Mohamed Atta's third announcement heard by ATC to Boston Center at 08:33.

8:33:59: A third transmission from Atta onboard Flight 11: "Nobody move, please. We are going back to the airport. Don't try to make any stupid moves."

8:34: Boston Center traffic manager Dan Bueno notifies the tower controller at Otis Air National Guard Base at Cape Cod of the hijacking of Flight 11. The controller directs Bueno to contact Northeast Air Defense Sector (NEADS), the northeast sector of NORAD. The controller then notifies Otis Operations Center that a call from NEADS might be coming. Two F-15 pilots begin to suit up.

8:36: The manager at the American Airlines SOC, Craig Marquis, initiates a "lockout" of Flight 11. This means that the airline is acknowledging that there is an emergency on the flight. A lockout isolates information so that the case can be managed by top leadership at the airlines in a way that protects information from being altered or released, and also protects the identities of the passengers and crew. Marquis then asks a coworker if Flight 11 is descending. The coworker replies "We don't know. The transponder is off so we have no active read on him."

8:37: Flight 175 confirms sighting of hijacked Flight 11 to flight controllers, 10 miles (16 km) to its south.

8:37:30: Flight 11 begins a rapid descent at 3,200 feet per minute, starting from an altitude of 29,000 feet. This descent continues until the moment of impact with the North Tower. Half a minute later, having descended one thousand feet, the flight makes a slight southward turn.

8:37:52: Boston Center control notifies NEADS of the hijacking of Flight 11, the first notification received by NORAD of a hijacking that morning. The controller requests military help to intercept the jetliner. As NEADS is running a training exercise at that point, it inquires as to the veracity of the request, with Boston Center responding that it is "not an exercise, not a test."

8:40: NEADS drives two fighter pilots at Otis Air National Guard Base to battle stations.

8:40: Boston Center, through the FAA's Herndon Command Center, relays information about Flight 11 to the FAA's New York TRACON.

8:40: An employee at the American Airlines Flight Services Office at Logan International Airport calls the American Airlines SOC to relay information about Flight 11 flight attendant Amy Sweeney's ongoing call with the office manager, Michael Woodward.

8:40: Flight 175 is passed from Boston Center to the FAA's New York Air Route Traffic Control Center (hereinafter "New York Center").

8:40: Flight 77 is passed from the FAA's Washington Air Route Traffic Control Center (hereinafter "Washington Center") to the FAA's Indianapolis Air Route Traffic Control Center (hereinafter "Indianapolis Center").

8:41: In reference to Flight 11, the manager at the American Airlines SOC, Craig Marquis, asks a coworker to "[t]ell ATC to handle this as an emergency." The coworker responds "They have in there it's been hijacked." The coworker then informs Marquis that Flight 11 is heading towards John F. Kennedy International Airport and may be descending.

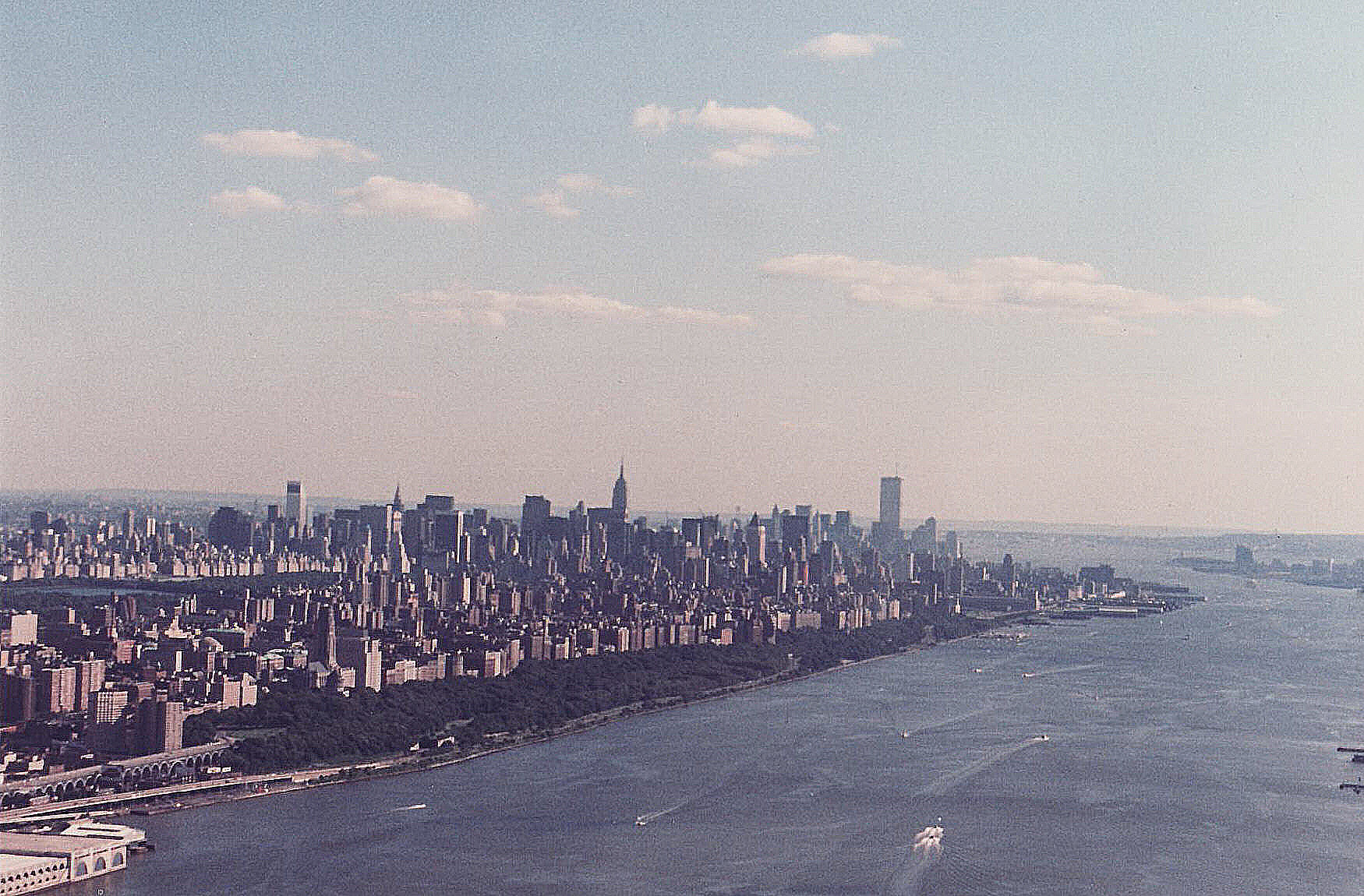
The World Trade Center towers seen from the cockpit of an aircraft over the Hudson River. American Airlines Flight 11 was traveling in roughly the same direction the camera is facing before it crashed.

8:41: New York Center requests information about Flight 11 over the radio. Flight 175 responds: "We heard a suspicious transmission on our departure out of Boston with someone, [it] sounded like someone keyed the mic and said: 'everyone stay in your seats'". New York Center acknowledges and says it will pass the information on. This is Flight 175's last communication with New York Center.

8:42–8:46 (approx.): In the skies over northern New Jersey, Flight 175 is hijacked. Most likely, two of the "muscle hijackers", Fayez Banihammad and Mohand al-Shehri, make the first moves, stabbing a flight attendant and then storming the cockpit, killing both pilots. Hamza al-Ghamdi and Ahmed al-Ghamdi then order remaining passengers and crew to the back of the plane, allowing their leader, Marwan al-Shehhi, to take control.

8:42: Flight 93, a Boeing 757, takes off with 37 passengers and seven crew members from Newark International Airport (now Newark Liberty International Airport), bound for San Francisco International Airport, following a 42-minute delay due to congested runways. Four hijackers are aboard. Its flight path initially takes it close to the World Trade Center, which is within four minutes of being struck, before moving away westbound. All four planes are now in the air.

8:43: An air traffic control specialist at the FAA's Herndon Command Center calls Washington Center to inform them that Flight 11 is a "possible hijack" and that the plane will enter Washington Center's airspace if it continues south.

8:43:30: While descending at 10,000 feet, Flight 11 makes a final turn, turning south-southwestward towards New York City, aiming for the World Trade Center.

8:44–8:46: (Note: The exact time is disputed. The 9/11 Commission Report states that Flight 11 struck the North Tower at 8:46:40 a.m., NIST reports 8:46:30 a.m., and some other sources claim 8:46:26 a.m.) Flight attendant Amy Sweeney, aboard Flight 11, reports by telephone to Michael Woodward at the American Airlines Flight Services Office at Logan International Airport: "Something is wrong. We are in a rapid descent. We are all over the place." A minute later, Woodward asks her to look out the window to see if she can tell where the plane is. She responds, "I see the water. I see the buildings. I see buildings." After a short pause, she reports, "We are flying low. We are flying very, very low. We are flying way too low." Seconds later she says, "Oh, my God, we are way too low." before the call is cut off. An employee relaying information about the call to the American Airlines SOC reports: "She [Sweeney] started screaming and saying something's wrong and now he's [Woodward] having trouble-now he thinks he might be disconnected. Okay, we just lost connection." At the same time, Betty Ong's call with the American Airlines reservation office in Cary, North Carolina is also cut off. The office supervisor, Nydia Gonzalez, informs SOC manager Craig Marquis: "We, I think we might have lost her."

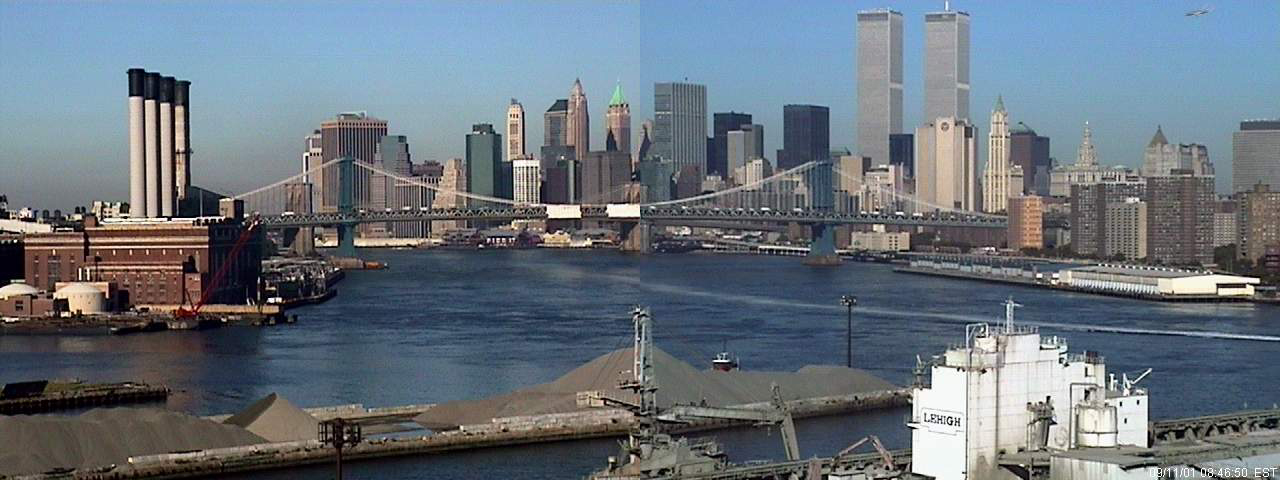
American Airlines Flight 11 approaching the North Tower seconds before crashing into it

8:45: The American Airlines director of security learns of Flight 11's hijacking and relays information about it to the special agent in charge of the FBI's Dallas Field Office.

Seconds after American Airlines Flight 11 impacted the North Tower

8:46: Flight 11 crashes into the North Tower of the World Trade Center. The plane, banked to the left and travelling at roughly 466 miles per hour (750 km/h; 208 m/s; 405 kn), strikes the center of the tower's north face between floors 93 and 99, and plows almost directly midway into the tower's central core. Hundreds are killed instantly, including everyone on the plane and untold others inside the North Tower. The impact gouges a plane-shaped hole spanning nearly the width of the skyscraper and triggers an explosion that can be seen and heard for miles. At least 166 windows are broken in the North Tower. The blast also shatters windows in the adjacent South Tower as its western and northern facades are hit by debris. Sweltering heat is felt by South Tower occupants across from the burning floors, and the smoke, blowing southeast, seeps into the building through air vents. The collision generates 0.9 magnitude seismic waves as observed by Columbia University's Lamont-Doherty Earth Observatory. Additionally, Flight 11's explosion sends ignited jet fuel pouring down through various passages in the North Tower, causing fatal injuries nearly a hundred floors below when a fireball sweeps through the main lobby. Severed water pipes, collapsed walls, dislodged ceiling tiles and severed electrical wires are reported from the lobby to the 92nd floor. All three stairwells from the roof to the ground (labeled A, B and C) are clustered together in the impact region, with just 70 feet (21 metres) of space between each one. The impact of the plane, given its size, instantly severs all three, rendering escape from the impact zone or above impossible. The 92nd floor, though technically the last floor below the impact zone, is also cut off from the rest of the tower due to the stairwells being blocked by debris from Flight 11's impacted 93rd through 99th floors immediately above and the elevators being destroyed or inoperable from the 50th floor upward. People in the North Tower below the impact zone, as well as in the South Tower, start to evacuate.

BBC correspondent Stephen Evans was sitting in the foyer of the South Tower and described hearing a "huge bang like somebody dropped a skip full of rubbish" followed by "two or three similar huge explosions", as the South Tower shook. French filmmaker Jules Naudet and Czech immigrant Pavel Hlava videotape the crash of Flight 11 with their video cameras from different locations. A camera belonging to local New York television station WNYW captures the sound of the approaching airplane and the crash. While the impact is not shown directly, it generates a weak electromagnetic pulse that causes the WNYW camera's video signal to drop out for a small fraction of a second. The camera's operator, David Stollak, picks it up off the ground and begins recording an image of the North Tower on fire approximately 13 seconds after the initial impact.

8:46: Flight 77 reaches its assigned cruising altitude of 35,000 feet.

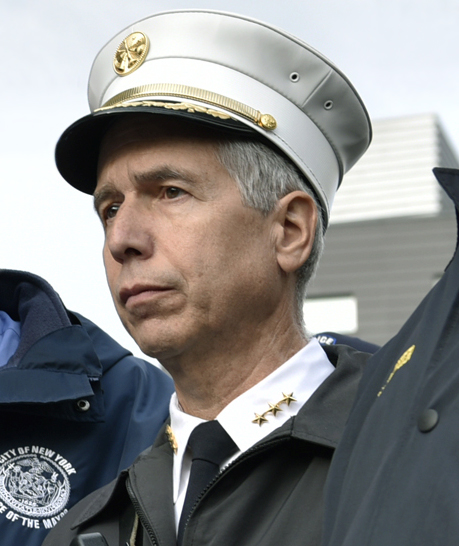
Battalion Chief Joseph W. Pfeifer, who made the first fire department radio message advising the FDNY Manhattan Fire Dispatch Office of the crash.

8:46:43: Chief of the New York City Fire Department's 1st Battalion Joseph W. Pfeifer makes the first fire department radio message advising the FDNY Manhattan Fire Dispatch Office of the crash. Chief Pfeifer and personnel from other fire companies were several blocks north, on the corner of Church Street and Lispenard Street investigating an odor of gas in the street, and witnessed the attack, along with Jules Naudet, who was accompanying the firefighters at the time:

Battalion 1 Chief (Chief Pfeifer): Battalion 1 to Manhattan.

Manhattan Dispatch: Battalion 1, K [go ahead].

Battalion 1 Chief (Chief Pfeifer): We just had a plane crash into the upper floor of the World Trade Center. Transmit a 2nd Alarm and start relocating companies into the area.

Manhattan Dispatch: 10-4 [message received], Battalion 1.

8:46:48: Two F-15 fighter jets are ordered to scramble from Otis Air National Guard Base, intended to intercept Flight 11.

Sergeant Jeremy W. Powell: This is HUNTRESS with an active air defense scramble for Panta 45, 46, time 12:46, authenticate delta x-ray. Scramble immediately, Panta 45, 46, heading 280, flight level 290, contact HUNTRESS on frequency 228.9, back-up 364.2. All parties acknowledge with initials.

Because Flight 11's transponder is off, the pilots do not know the location of their target. When Flight 11 crashed, its track disappeared from radar. NEADS spends the next several minutes watching their radar screens in anticipation of Flight 11 returning a radar contact. However, unknown to NEADS at the time, Flight 11 has already impacted the North Tower. NEADS will not become aware of the crash at the World Trade Center until 8:50 am.

8:47: Flight 175's transponder code is changed twice in one minute. However, the New York Center controller handling the flight, David Bottiglia, does not initially notice because he is trying to locate Flight 11.

8:48:08: WNYW breaks into a Paramount Pictures movie trailer for Zoolander to make the first broadcast report of an incident at the World Trade Center, less than two minutes after Flight 11's crash. One of the station's camera crews, already out on location at City Hall Park that morning for New York's mayoral primary election, takes the first live pictures of black smoke coming from the North Tower. As these pictures are broadcast, the voice of reporter Dick Oliver is heard as he reports from the scene to anchor Jim Ryan, who was not in the studio at the time:

Jim, just a few moments ago, something believed to be a plane crashed into the South Tower of the World Trade Center. I just saw flames inside, you can see the smoke coming out of the tower; we have no idea what it was. It was a tremendous boom just a few moments ago. You can hear around me emergency vehicles heading towards the scene. Now this could have been an aircraft or it could have been something internal. It appears to be something coming from the outside, due to the nature of the opening on about the 100th floor of the South Tower of the World Trade Center.

Three minutes later, Jim Ryan corrected the location of the first plane crash from the South Tower to the North Tower.

8:48:29: The first radio report of the incident is heard on WCBS-AM through traffic reporter Tom Kaminski. WCBS' traffic reports are delivered every ten minutes "on the 8s", meaning that Kaminski's traffic report was to come within two minutes of the initial impact of Flight 11 (although there is no record of how much time actually passed). At the time Kaminski was in "Chopper 880", WCBS' helicopter that he reports from for morning and evening rush hour traffic reports. The following consists of WCBS anchor Pat Carroll crossing to Kaminski in the chopper before he files his report.

Pat Carroll: WCBS news time, 8:48, it's traffic and weather together sponsored by Henry Miller's Theatre. Tom Kaminski, Chopper 880.

Tom Kaminski: Alright uh, Pat, we are just currently getting a look at the World Trade Center, We have something that has happened here at the World Trade Center. We noticed flame and an awful lot of smoke from one of the towers of the World Trade Center. We are just coming up on this scene, this is easily three-quarters of the way up. We are… This is… Whatever has occurred has just occurred, uh, within minutes and, uh, we are trying to determine exactly what that is. But currently we have a lot of smoke at the top of the towers of the World Trade Center, we will keep you posted.

8:49: The first report of an incident at the World Trade Center crosses the Associated Press newswire.

8:49:03: Local New York public radio station WNYC host Mark Hilan broadcasts the station's first report of the incident.

CNN breaking the news of a plane crash at the World Trade Center

8:49:34: The first network television and radio reports of an explosion or incident at the World Trade Center. CNN breaks into a Ditech commercial at 8:49. The CNN screen subtitle first reads "WORLD TRADE CENTER DISASTER". Carol Lin, the first TV network anchor to break the news of the attacks, says:

This just in. You are looking at obviously a very disturbing live shot there. That is the World Trade Center, and we have unconfirmed reports this morning that a plane has crashed into one of the towers of the World Trade Center. CNN Center right now is just beginning to work on this story, obviously calling our sources and trying to figure out exactly what happened, but clearly something relatively devastating happening this morning there on the south end of the island of Manhattan. That is, once again, a picture of one of the towers of the World Trade Center.

Just a minute later, Sean Murtagh, CNN vice president of finance, in an on-air phone call, says from his office in the CNN New York bureau that a large passenger commercial jet was seen to hit the World Trade Center. The first email bulletins of breaking news from CNN and MSNBC report "fire at tower of World Trade Center". Both CNN and MSNBC's websites receive such heavy traffic that many of their web servers fail under the strain of the vast amounts of traffic. BBC News web servers remain operational, and their website shows a picture of the North Tower on fire. Minutes later, email news bulletins revise the reports of fire to a plane crash.

8:50: NEADS is notified that a plane has struck the World Trade Center as its on-duty personnel continue to try to locate Flight 11 on radar.

8:50 (approx.) An American Airlines employee at LaGuardia Airport calls American Airlines headquarters to inform them that a plane has crashed into the World Trade Center.

8:50: Delta Air Lines Flight 1489 reports the sight of smoke coming from Lower Manhattan to New York Center controller David Bottiglia. Bottiglia acknowledges the message and agrees to pass it on. This is the first word any pilots in flight receive of the incident. Bottiglia then notices that Flight 175 has changed its transponder code and asks it to recycle the transponder back to the correct code. Flight 175 does not reply. Bottiglia makes five unsuccessful attempts to contact Flight 175 over the next three minutes.

8:50: FDNY 1st Battalion chief Joseph Pfeifer is the first fire chief to enter the World Trade Center after the North Tower impact. He is joined by several FDNY companies on entry as he starts setting up command in the tower.

8:50: Local New York radio station WOR news anchor Ed Walsh makes the station's first on-air report of the incident.

8:50: WCBS-TV in New York breaks away from the CBS network to cover the attack, with anchor Mike Pomeranz providing the station's first report.

8:50: On CNBC's Squawk Box, host Mark Haines is interviewing a mutual fund portfolio manager, Bill Nygren of the Oakmark Select Fund, when he sees pictures of the burning North Tower. "Is that the World Trade Tower?" he asks before directly spoken by reporter David Faber. His on-air colleague Joe Kernen tells him that a plane had hit the tower. CNBC is the first NBC outlet to begin reporting on the disaster.

8:50: Local New York cable television channel NY1 anchor Pat Kiernan begins the channel's coverage of the incident.

8:50: Local New York radio station WABC news anchor George Weber broadcasts the station's first report of the incident.

8:50:07: The traffic management units for Boston Center and New York Center state that they have both lost the primary target that they were tracking, referring to Flight 11. Roughly a minute later, New York Center passes on information supplied by Kennedy Tower about a fire at the World Trade Center.

New York Center: Kennedy Tower reports...you serious? Kennedy Tower reports that there was a fire at the World Trade Center. And that's, ah, that's the area where we lost the airplane.

8:50:47: Local New York television station WNBC breaks away from the NBC network to begin its coverage of the attack, with anchor Jane Hanson providing the station's initial report.

8:50:51: Flight 77 has its last routine communication with Indianapolis Center.

8:51–10:28: (Note: There are reports that the jumping/falling commenced within two minutes of the impact, but the first confirmed victim was observed falling at 8:51 a.m.) With Flight 11 leaving more than a thousand people still alive but trapped in the top 19 floors of the now-burning North Tower, some 100-200 people plummet from the skyscraper. Most of the victims witnessed falling are left with no choice but to take their own lives by jumping to escape the heat, smoke, and flames, although some of the falls are accidents caused by people losing their grip or balance. No form of airborne evacuation is attempted as smoke is too dense for a successful landing on the roof of either tower.

8:51–8:54 (approx): As it nears the border of West Virginia and Ohio, Flight 77 is hijacked. Unlike the other flights, there are no reports of stabbings or bomb threats, and the pilots are forced to the back of the plane with the other passengers and crew.

8:51: ABC, the first terrestrial television network to break news of the attack, was airing Good Morning America in the eastern half of the country at the time. After returning from a commercial break, WABC-TV in New York breaks away from the ABC network, with anchor Steve Bartelstein beginning the station's own local coverage of the disaster, while on the network, GMA host Diane Sawyer makes this statement:

We want to tell you what we know, as we know it, but we just got a report in that there's been some sort of explosion at the World Trade Center in New York City. One report said, and we can't confirm any of this, that a plane may have hit one of the two towers of the World Trade Center, but again, you are seeing the live pictures here. We have no further details than that. We don't know anything about what they have concluded happened there this morning. But we're going to find out, and of course, make sure that everybody knows on the air.

Coverage of the incident began on the rest of the ABC network a minute later.

8:51: Matt Lauer, co-host of NBC News' Today, interrupts an interview with author Richard Hack and says to the audience, "We wanna go live right now, and show you a picture of the World Trade Center, where I understand... Do we have it?" However, NBC did not immediately have the picture ready and went to a regularly scheduled commercial break. They return with a shot of the burning tower.

8:51: GloboNews anchor Leila Sterenberg makes the first Brazilian television report of the first plane crash.

8:51: Flight 175 deviates from its assigned altitude.

8:51: New York City's Amateur Radio Emergency Service net is activated, with ham operators in the area assisting with emergency communications.

8:51:34: WINS-AM interrupts its 8:51 traffic report and anchor James Faherty relays word of the crash of Flight 11 to the listening audience, with the station having been notified by one of its employees who lives near the site.

8:51:46: Televisa news anchor Jorge Berry starts broadcasting the first report of the incident over Mexican television.

8:52–8:59: A passenger on Flight 175 attempts to call his wife four times but cannot get through.

8:52: Lee Hanson in Easton, Connecticut, receives a phone call from his son, Peter, a passenger on United 175, who says: "I think they've taken over the cockpit—an attendant has been stabbed—and someone else up front may have been killed. The plane is making strange moves. Call United Airlines—tell them it's Flight 175, Boston to LA." Lee then calls the Easton Police Department and tells them about the call.

8:52: On board Flight 175, flight attendant Robert Fangman calls a United Airlines maintenance facility in San Francisco, reporting to Marc Policastro that the flight had been hijacked, both pilots had been killed, a flight attendant had been stabbed, and the hijackers were probably flying the plane. After the call, Policastro and a colleague try unsuccessfully to contact the flight via ACARS. Policastro's colleague sends the following message three times: "I heard of a reported incident aboard your acft [aircraft]. Plz confirm all is normal." Flight 175 does not reply.

8:52: On WNYC, an employee of the station relates an observation of the plane hitting the North Tower as belonging to American Airlines.

8:52: Anchor Chris Jansing makes the first announcement on MSNBC of a plane crash into the World Trade Center.

8:52: CBS interrupts The Early Show to report the news of the attack. Bryant Gumbel makes the announcement that a plane has crashed into the World Trade Center.

8:52: CBC Newsworld anchor Mark Kelley makes the first Canadian television report of the first plane crash.

8:52: Sky News presenter Kay Burley breaks the news of the first plane crash to the UK.

8:52:50: Fox News' Fox & Friends comes back from a commercial break to report the attack. E. D. Hill informs viewers that a plane crashed into the North Tower.

8:53: The F-15s at Otis Air National Guard Base are airborne. Still lacking an intercept vector to Flight 11 (and not aware that it has already crashed), they are sent to military controlled airspace off Long Island and ordered to remain in a holding pattern until between 9:09 and 9:13.

8:53: The Associated Press puts out its initial report acknowledging a plane crash at the World Trade Center, citing television reports.

8:53: Network Ten news anchor Sandra Sully makes the first report of the incident over Australian television.

8:53:23: Business presenter John Terrett issues the first report of the disaster over BBC News 24 in the UK.

8:54: Flight 77 deviates from its assigned course by making a slight turn south.

8:54: BBC World news anchor Nisha Pillai makes the channel's first report of the disaster. The channel does not start continuous coverage until 9:00.

8:54: Rede Globo anchor Carlos Nascimento makes the first Brazilian terrestrial television report of the first plane crash. Minutes after, the network resumes its regular programming (children's show Bambuluá) until starting continuous coverage of the events at 8:57.

8:55–9:02: Air traffic controllers at New York Center watch Flight 175 as it descends rapidly to a very low altitude. During its descent, it barely avoids colliding with Tampa-bound Delta Air Lines Flight 2315, Charlotte-bound US Airways Flight 542, St. Louis-bound TWA Flight 3, and LaGuardia-bound Midwest Express Flight 7.

8:55 (approx.): An announcement is made over the building-wide PA system by officials in the superficially damaged South Tower, "The building is secure, please return to your desks." The South Tower's occupants react in numerous ways, ranging from going back to their offices as suggested, ignoring it and evacuating anyway, or congregating in common areas such as the 78th floor sky lobby.

8:55: President George W. Bush arrives at Emma E. Booker Elementary School in Sarasota, Florida, as part of a scheduled visit to promote education and is reading The Pet Goat when his senior advisor Karl Rove, who is with Bush, informs him that a small twin-engine plane has crashed into the World Trade Center. Before entering the classroom, the President speaks to National Security Advisor Condoleezza Rice, who is at the White House. She first tells him it was a twin-engine aircraft—and then a commercial aircraft—that had struck the World Trade Center, adding "that's all we know right now, Mr. President."

8:55 (approx.): A supervisor at New York Center notifies the center's operations manager of Flight 175's hijacking.

8:56: Ten minutes after the North Tower of the World Trade Center was hit by Flight 11, the transponder on Flight 77 is turned off and even primary radar contact with the aircraft is lost. This is because Flight 77 is flying through the National Radio Quiet Zone, where radar coverage is limited. The Indianapolis controller handling Flight 77 informs his colleagues of the situation, and he and two managers search for the flight, but they are unable to find it.

8:57: Flight 175 levels off at 28,500 feet, and makes a final turn toward New York City.

8:57: TV Azteca's Noticiario Hechos interrupts a newsreel. Anchor Ramón Fregoso informs Mexican viewers of the plane crash. The station had briefly broadcast images of the burning North Tower two minutes earlier.

8:58: The New York Center controller handling Flight 175, David Bottiglia, tells a colleague "we might have a hijack over here, two of them."

8:58 (approx.): Indianapolis Center calls American Airlines and informs the airline that they have lost contact with Flight 77. An American Airlines dispatcher tries unsuccessfully to contact the flight via ACARS.

8:59: Flight 175 passenger Brian Sweeney leaves a message via airphone to his wife, Julie:

Jules, this is Brian. Listen, I'm on an airplane that's been hijacked. If things don't go well, and it's not looking good, I just want you to know I absolutely love you, I want you to do good, go have good times, same to my parents and everybody, and I just totally love you, and I'll see you when you get there. Bye, babe. I hope I call you.

=== 9:00 a.m. ===
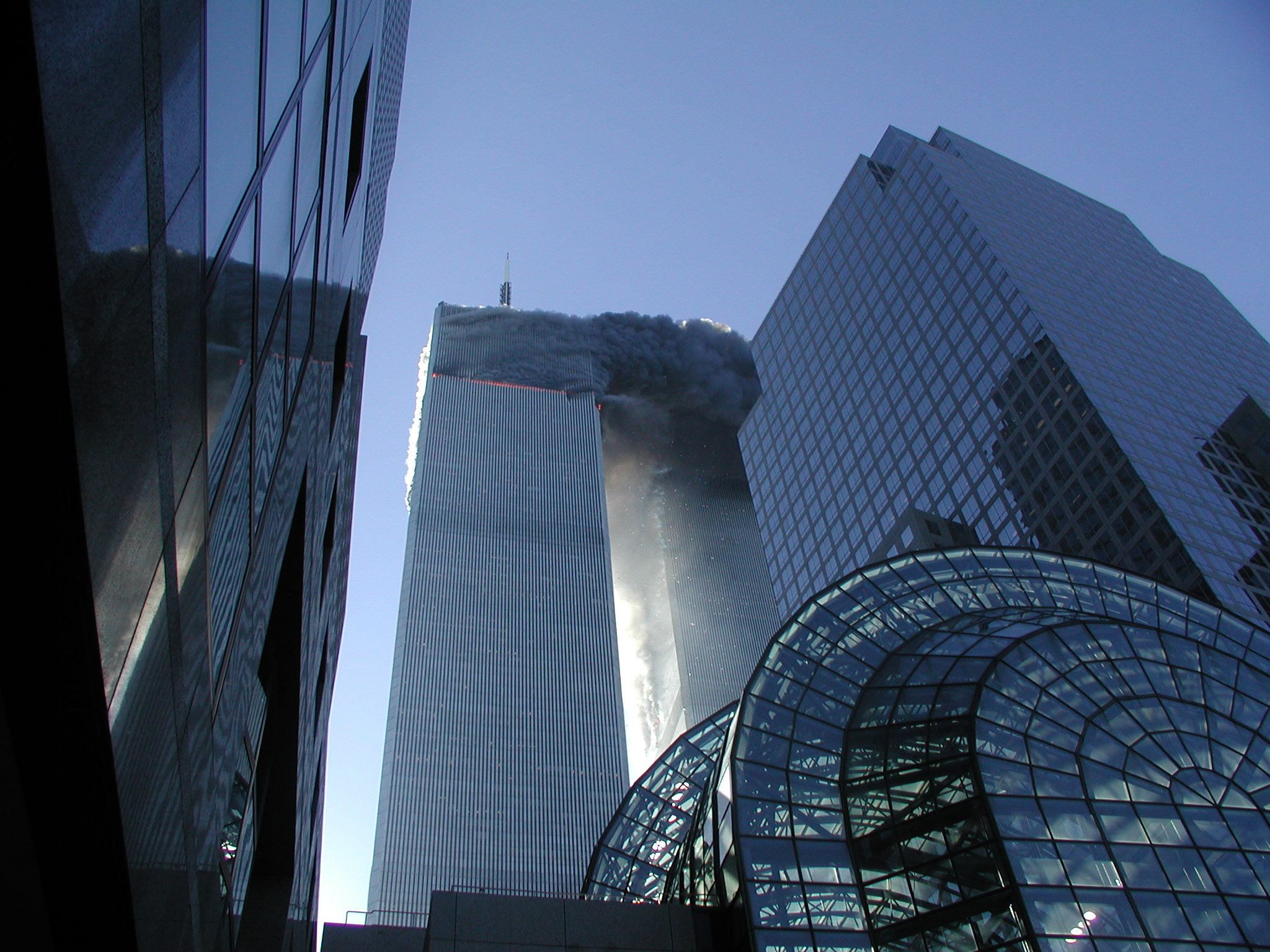
The Twin Towers on fire

9:00 (approx.): A supervisor of a United Airlines maintenance facility in San Francisco calls United's station operations control center in Chicago and informs the center's manager and United's security chief about Flight 175's hijacking. The manager initially believes that the report is referring to Flight 11's hijacking, but the maintenance facility's supervisor reiterates that the report is about Flight 175. The station operations control center's manager passes the report on to the center's director, who in turn passes it on to United's Chief Operating Officer, Andy Studdert, and United's Chief Executive Officer, James Goodwin. The station operations control center's director and the maintenance facility's supervisor begin the process of activating United's crisis center. The activation process takes about 30 minutes.

9:00 (approx.): New York Center informs United Airlines' air traffic control coordinator that Flight 175 is missing from radar.

9:00: After leaving a message to his wife, Flight 175 passenger Brian Sweeney calls his mother, Louise. He tells her about the hijacking and mentions that passengers are considering storming the cockpit and taking control of the aircraft. Concerned that the hijackers would return, he informs her that he might have to hang up quickly. After saying their goodbyes, he hangs up.

9:00: American Airlines executive vice president Gerard Arpey learns that contact with Flight 77 is lost. He orders all American Airlines aircraft in the Northeast that have not taken off yet to remain on the ground.

9:00: Flight 77 turns east and begins to descend.

9:00: The first French television report of the disaster is broadcast over La Chaîne Info by anchor Marianne Kottenhoff.

9:00: The first Spanish television report of the disaster is broadcast over Antena 3 by news anchor Matías Prats Luque.

9:00: The first Filipino television report of the disaster is broadcast over by NBN by news anchors Gani Oro and Martin Andanar.

9:00: Lee Hanson receives a second call from his son Peter, aboard Flight 175, telling him that his plane is about to crash:

"It's getting bad, Dad. A stewardess was stabbed. They seem to have knives and Mace. They said they have a bomb. It's getting very bad on the plane. Passengers are throwing up and getting sick. The plane is making jerky movements. I don't think the pilot is flying the plane. I think we are going down. I think they intend to go to Chicago or someplace and fly into a building. Don't worry, Dad. If it happens, it'll be very fast. My God, my God."

The call ends abruptly just as Lee hears a woman scream. Shortly afterward, he witnesses the second aircraft impact the South Tower on live TV.

9:01 or 9:02: United Airlines flight dispatcher Ed Ballinger is informed by his manager of Flight 175's hijacking.

9:01–9:02: A manager from the FAA's New York Center tells the Herndon Command Center:

New York Center: We have several situations going on here. It's escalating big, big time. We need to get the military involved with us.

Herndon Command Center: We're, we're involved with something else, we have other aircraft that may have a similar situation going on here.

9:01: New York Center contacts New York Terminal Radar Approach Control (TRACON) and asks for help in locating Flight 175. The terminal approach controllers find the flight over Central New Jersey in a rapid descent, headed for Lower Manhattan. A New York Center manager states "[a]lright. Heads up, man, it looks like another one coming in."

9:01: News anchor Lynne White of local New York television station WPIX (channel 11) begins the station's report on the attack.

9:01: The first Japanese television report of the disaster is made over NHK Television by news anchor Masaaki Horio.

9:02: Evacuation of both World Trade Center towers is ordered by FDNY Battalion Chief Joseph Pfeifer, who was stationed in the lobby of the North Tower. Although it is uncertain whether the South Tower's deputy fire safety director receives this order, an announcement is made over the tower's PA system to "begin an orderly evacuation if conditions warranted".

9:02: Indianapolis Center calls American Airlines and informs the airline that they do not know where Flight 77 is and that they cannot contact it.

9:02: Flight 93 reaches its cruising altitude of 35,000 feet.

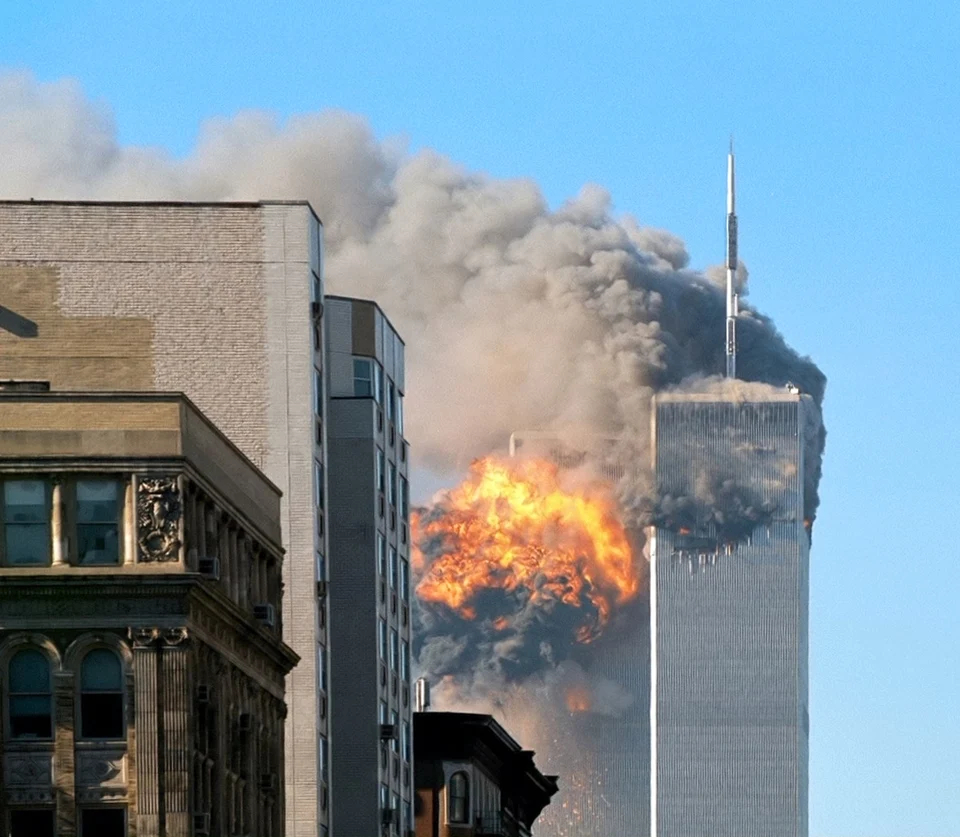
The fireball erupting out of the South Tower from the impact of Flight 175

9:03: (Note: Pavel Hlava's video, which was filmed with a camcorder that included a timestamp, fixes the moment of the second impact at 16 minutes and 29 seconds after the first impact. The first impact on Hlava's tape is timestamped at 8:46:28 and the second impact is timestamped at 9:02:57. The initiation of the collapse of the South Tower is timestamped at 9:58:57, fixing the collapse at exactly 56 minutes after the impact.) Flight 175 crashes at about 590 mph (950 km/h; 260 m/s; 510 kn) into the south face of the South Tower (2 WTC) of the World Trade Center, between floors 77 and 85. The exploding jet fuel generates a massive fireball emerging from the southern, eastern and northern facades of the South Tower. East face windows on the already-burning North Tower are smashed as the shockwave from the explosion hits them. Parts of the plane, including the starboard engine, leave the South Tower from its east and north sides, falling to the ground six blocks away. The Lamont-Doherty Earth Observatory recorded 0.7 magnitude seismic waves being generated by the collision. All 65 people on board the aircraft die instantly on impact, and unknown hundreds in the building as well. The impact causes the tower to sway at a very low frequency, described by at least one building occupant, Brian Clark, as feeling like his floor, floor 84, moved laterally by between six and eight feet, or about two metres. By this time, several media organizations are covering the immediate aftermath of the first plane crash, so millions of television viewers are able to see the impact live. New York's WNYW is among the first to specifically report that a second plane has crashed into the complex (many other news agencies do not realize that a second plane has crashed until several minutes later):

Jim Ryan: As you look at the picture from our chopper now, arriving at the scene, uh, Jim Friedl in Hoboken, uh, said it appeared to bank sharply and smash directly, perhaps purposefully into... Oh, my goodness. There's another one. Oh, my goodness. There's another one!

Lyn Brown: This seems to be on purpose.

Jim Ryan: Oh, my goodness. Now you...

Kai Simonsen (WNYW helicopter reporter): Was that a plane?

Jim Ryan: Now it's obvious. I think that there's a second plane just crashed into the World Trade Center. I think we have a terrorist act of proportions that we cannot begin to imagine at this juncture.

Kai Simonsen: Oh, my God.

Jim Ryan: My goodness, a second plane now has crashed into the other tower of the World Trade Center. [sigh] Obviously, suicide terrorist attack on the World Trade Center. What we have... what we have been fearing... [interrupted by unintelligible talkdown from Kai Simonsen] What we have been fearing for the longest time here apparently has come to pass. A disastrous terrorist attack on the World Trade Center. Both towers, planes smashing into each one.

A massive evacuation begins in the South Tower below its impact zone. One of the stairwells in the South Tower remains unblocked from the top to the bottom of the tower because of the plane hitting at an offset from the vertical center line of the building, but it is filled with smoke. This leads many people to mistakenly go upwards towards the roof for a rooftop rescue that never comes. The Port Authority of New York and New Jersey kept the two sets of heavy metal doors leading to the building's only roof exit tightly locked. The impact severs communication with several television and radio broadcast towers at the WTC; WPIX's satellite feed freezes on a still image of the second impact which is all the station broadcasts until alternate transmitters are set up hours later. The affected television stations' terrestrial signals go off the air; however, they continue to broadcast, with their signals still receivable through local cable TV systems in the area, and WCBS-TV having backup transmitter facilities atop the Empire State Building.

Because of the North Tower's obstruction of the South Tower from certain camera angles, some are initially unaware that a second plane has struck the South Tower, and instead mistakenly believe that the second explosion has occurred in the North Tower. As instant replays of the second plane crash are shown, the anchors on the three major broadcast networks speculate on whether they are witnessing a terrorist attack or some sort of very rare accident. CNN changes its headline to read "Second plane crashes into World Trade Center." The crash occurred as CNN was taking a feed from WABC-TV, and anchor Steve Bartelstein first assumed that the explosion seen was caused when the fuselage of the first plane exploded. This was also the assumption that Regis Philbin initially made during the day's airing of Live with Regis and Kelly, which began at 9:00 AM.

9:03: President Bush enters a classroom as part of his school visit.

9:03: United Airlines dispatchers begin sending ACARS messages to their aircraft in flight informing them of the plane crash at the World Trade Center.

9:03: A manager at Boston Center, Terry Biggio, calls the FAA's New England regional office in Burlington, Massachusetts, and tells them that the Flight 11 hijackers said "we have planes" in their earlier transmission. He emphasizes that the hijackers said "planes as in plural."

9:03: New York Center notifies NEADS of the hijacking of Flight 175, at the same time it crashes.

9:03: United Airlines flight dispatcher Ed Ballinger sends the following ACARS message to Flight 175: "How is the ride. Anything dispatch can do for you." At the same time, United's air traffic control coordinator sends the following ACARS message to the flight: "NY approach lookin' for ya on [frequency] 127.4." They resend their messages a few moments later.

9:03:18: The FAA's New York TRACON stops all departures from airports in its jurisdiction. Ground movements at those airports are not yet stopped.

9:03:22: Boston Center manager Terry Biggio informs the New England regional office that a second plane has hit the World Trade Center.

9:04–9:07: NEADS calls Boston Center seeking information about Flight 175. During the call, Boston Center informs NEADS of the second crash at the World Trade Center.

9:04: Fox News anchor Jon Scott mentions Osama bin Laden as a possible suspect.

9:04 (approx.): Boston Center stops all departures from airports in its jurisdiction (New England and eastern New York State). The Center's manager, Terry Biggio, informs the New England regional office of this, and suggests that the office "do the same elsewhere."

9:05: After brief introductions to the Booker elementary students, President Bush is about to begin reading The Pet Goat with the students when Chief of Staff Andrew Card interrupts to whisper to the President, "A second plane hit the second tower. America is under attack." For several moments, the President is seen to vacantly stare out into space as he silently processes this information. The President states later that he decided to continue the lesson rather than alarm the students.

9:05: On an open line monitored by the Herndon Command Center, Boston Center manager Terry Biggio informs the New England regional office that the hijackers on Flight 11 said "we have planes."

9:05: Flight 77 reappears on Indianapolis Center radar as a primary target. However, controllers are unable to find it because they are searching along its projected flight path based on its last known position.

9:05: American Airlines initiates a lockout of Flight 77.

9:05: Windows on the World employee Veronique Bowers calls her mother, Daphne, from her office in the North Tower. Daphne recalls her daughter saying "Mommy, the building is on fire; there's smoke coming through the walls. I can't breathe. I love you, Mommy; goodbye."

9:05: New York Center declares "ATC Zero." This means that no aircraft is allowed to depart from, arrive at, or fly through its airspace until further notice.

9:06: The FAA begins imposing blanket temporary flight restrictions, with the first restriction banning takeoffs of all flights bound to or through the New York flight information region from airports in that FIR and the three adjacent domestic FIRs—Boston, Cleveland, and Washington. This is referred to as a First Tier groundstop and covers the Northeast from North Carolina north and as far west as eastern Michigan.

9:06: CNBC news anchor Alina Cho reports the evacuation of the New York Stock Exchange.

9:07: Fearing additional attacks, Boston Center manager Terry Biggio asks the New England regional office manager if warnings to increase cockpit security could be sent via "ACARS or something." The New England regional office manager advises Biggio to contact the Air Transport Association (ATA) and ask them to tell the airlines to send the warnings to their flights. However, Biggio decides that Boston Center will issue a Notice to Airmen (NOTAM).

9:07 (approx.): Flight 77 levels off at 25,000ft and turns slightly north.

9:08: The NEADS Mission Crew Commander, Maj. Kevin Nasypany, learns of the second plane crash at the World Trade Center and tells his crew the following:

"This is what I foresee that we probably need to do. We need to talk to FAA. We need to tell 'em if this stuff is gonna keep on going, we need to take those fighters, put 'em over Manhattan. That's best thing, that's the best play right now. So coordinate with the FAA. Tell 'em if there's more out there, which we don't know, let's get 'em over Manhattan. At least we got some kind of play."

9:08: United Airlines dispatcher Ed Ballinger sends ACARS messages to United's transcontinental flights that have not taken off yet informing them that a groundstop has been ordered for the New York area.

9:08: Believing Flight 77 has crashed, since they had lost radio contact and radar contact with the flight, Indianapolis Center calls Langley Air Force Base and the West Virginia State Police and advises them to look for a possible crash site in Ohio or West Virginia and begin search and rescue.

9:08 (approx.) American Airlines officials at the SOC conclude that the second plane to crash into the World Trade Center was Flight 77.

9:08: The FAA bans all takeoffs nationwide for flights going to or through the New York flight information region. ABC News reports later that the Port Authority of New York and New Jersey, the agency that runs the New York-area airports, asked the FAA for permission to close down the New York FIR.

9:09–9:10: Boston Center manager Terry Biggio instructs Boston Center controllers to inform their flights of the attacks in New York and to heighten cockpit security.

9:09: Indianapolis Center declares that Flight 77 has crashed in either Ohio or West Virginia, and they inform the relevant regional FAA Center of this.

9:09: After learning of the second plane crash at the World Trade Center, NEADS drives two fighter jets, who are on alert, at Langley Air Force Base to battle stations.

9:09: In the UK, terrestrial channel BBC One interrupts their schedule to bring live news coverage and information from ABC.

Sometime between 9:10 and 9:20: A United Airlines dispatch manager calls an American Airlines dispatch manager regarding the two crashes at the World Trade Center. The American dispatch manager says that he believes that both planes are his, but the United dispatch manager says that he is increasingly "confident" that the second plane is Flight 175 because, in slow motion and enlarged replays of the second plane crash on CNN, he could see that the plane does not have the shiny, metallic color of an American Airlines plane.

9:10: A United Airlines dispatch manager writes in the timeline log "At that point a second aircraft had hit the WTC, but we didn't know it was our United flight."

9:11: Flight 77 flight attendant Renee May attempts to call her parents but cannot get through.

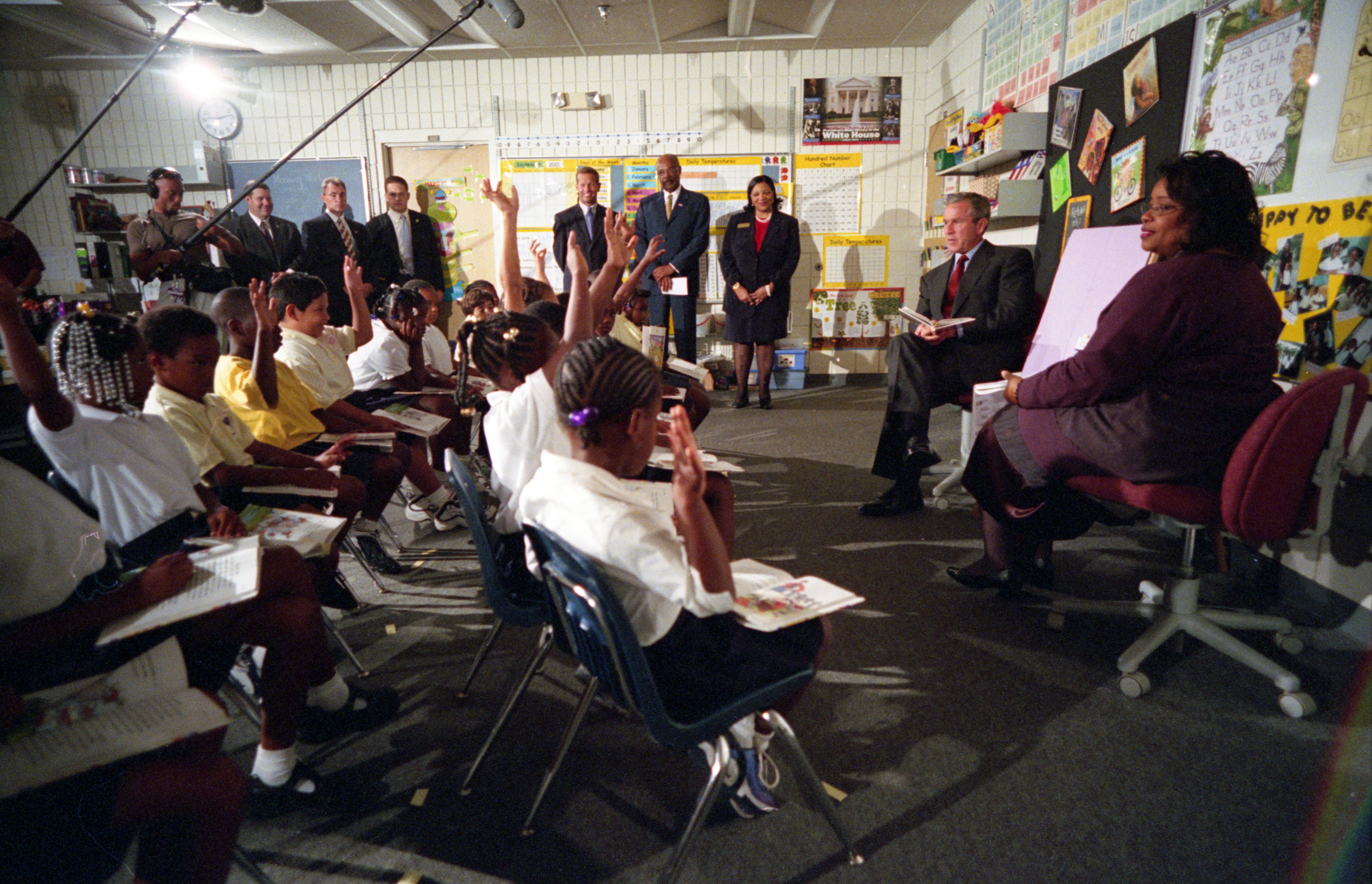
President George W. Bush on the morning of September 11, 2001, at Emma E. Booker Elementary School in Sarasota, Florida

9:11: The last PATH train leaves the World Trade Center. The station was vacant when the towers collapsed.

9:11: Live With Regis and Kelly interrupts its regular taping and joins WABC-TV's coverage.

9:11: ABC News anchor Peter Jennings begins reporting on the disaster.

9:12: A staff analyst at United Airlines headquarters alerts United dispatch, flight safety, and flight operations about the American Airlines crash and that Flight 175 is missing.

9:12: On Flight 77, flight attendant Renee May calls her mother, Nancy, in Las Vegas. She says that "six persons" have forced "us" to the rear of the airplane, and asks Nancy to call American Airlines before hanging up. Nancy and her husband promptly do so after the call. They reach an American Airlines employee at Reagan National Airport and relay the information Renee has given them. The employee initially believes that the Mays are talking about the plane that crashed into the World Trade Center, but Nancy reiterates that she is talking about Flight 77, which is still in the air. The employee promptly informs the flight services manager of the call with the Mays and is told to evacuate.

9:13: The F-15 fighters from Otis Air National Guard Base leave military airspace near Long Island, bound for Manhattan. Radar shows that the fighters are approximately 115 mi (185 km) away from the city.

9:14: President Bush returns to an adjacent classroom commandeered by the U.S. Secret Service. The classroom contains a telephone, a television showing the news coverage, and several senior staff members. The president speaks to Vice President Dick Cheney, Condoleezza Rice, New York Governor George Pataki, and FBI Director Robert Mueller, and prepares brief remarks.

9:15: NBC News reports unconfirmed statements from employees at United Airlines that an American Airlines aircraft had been hijacked prior to its destruction.

9:15 (approx.) Boston Center manager Daniel Bueno calls the Herndon Command Center to have them instruct all the other FAA centers in the country issue cockpit security warnings to all airborne aircraft.

9:15 (approx.): American Airlines orders all its airborne aircraft to land.

9:16: An air traffic control specialist at the American Airlines SOC calls the Herndon Command Center to inform them that American "thought" that Flight 11 was the first plane to hit the World Trade Center and that Flight 77 is "missing." During the call, the specialist is informed that Flight 77 might have crashed into the World Trade Center, and he passes this on. The Herndon Command Center replies that the second crash is not Flight 77 because "we [ATC] have another call sign" for that incident.

9:16: Flight 77 passenger Barbara Olson calls her husband, Ted, the US Solicitor General. She reveals that the hijackers have knives and box cutters, that everyone, including the pilots, has been moved to the back of the plane, and that the call is being made without the knowledge of the hijackers. The connection drops a minute into the conversation. After the call, Ted contacts the command center at the Department of Justice, and tries unsuccessfully to contact Attorney General John Ashcroft.

Sometime between 9:17 and 9:22: Hanjour broadcasts a deceptive announcement via Flight 77's public address system, advising those aboard that the plane is being hijacked and that not resisting offers the best chance of survival.

9:17: The FAA closes down all New York City-area airports. The city had initially asked the FAA to do so.

9:17:02: CBS News correspondent Jim Stewart in Washington, D.C. mentions that in the intelligence community, Osama bin Laden is a probable suspect.

9:18: CNN makes reference to foul play for the first time, stating the FBI was investigating a report of plane hijacking. CNN changes headline to read "AP: Plane was hijacked before crashes".

9:18: By this time, Indianapolis Center, Cleveland Center, and Washington Center are aware of the two World Trade Center crashes and that Flight 77 is missing.

9:18–9:19: Infrared video is taken of the Twin Towers, showing the extent of the fires burning in the impact zones of each of the towers, along with a salient hotspot in the North Tower several floors below its impact zone.

9:19: United Airlines flight dispatcher Ed Ballinger begins sending a warning text message via ACARS to his 16 transcontinental flights: "Beware any cockpit intrusion—Two a/c [aircraft] hit World Trade Center." This takes several minutes, and would not be received onboard United 93 for four more minutes.

9:20: The United Airlines dispatch manager believes that Flight 175 is the second plane that crashed into the World Trade Center.

9:20 (approx.): After learning of other hijackings, Indianapolis Center begins to doubt its initial assumption that Flight 77 has crashed.

9:21: NEADS receives a report that Flight 11 is still airborne and "heading towards Washington" and that "it was evidently another aircraft that hit the Tower." This is actually Flight 77.

9:21: The Herndon Command Center contacts Dulles TRACON and tells a supervisor there that the FAA has lost contact with Flight 77 and that they cannot find it. After the call, the supervisor advises the TRACON controllers that a commercial aircraft is missing and tells them to look for a primary target.

9:21 (approx.): The Herndon Command Center, other FAA facilities, and American Airlines join the search for Flight 77.

9:21: United Airlines flight dispatcher Ed Ballinger receives a routine ACARS message from Flight 93's pilot, Jason Dahl: "Good mornin' ... Nice clb [climb] outta EWR [Newark airport] after a nice tour of the apt [apartment] courts y [and] grnd cntrl [ground control]. 20 N EWC At 350 occl [occasional] It [light] chop. Wind 290/50 ain't helping. J."

9:21: All bridges and tunnels into Manhattan are closed. The George Washington Bridge is, however, kept open to allow vehicle traffic to evacuate from Manhattan, and the Brooklyn and Manhattan Bridges are kept open for pedestrian evacuation. In addition, New Jersey Transit continues its train service into New York Penn Station to allow more people to evacuate the island, and over the next several hours, the United States Coast Guard coordinates maritime evacuations of thousands more people from Lower Manhattan to New Jersey and Staten Island.

9:21: The United Airlines air traffic control coordinator sends a message to dispatch: "There may be Addnl hijackings in progress. You may want to advise your fits to stay on alert and shut down all cockpit access Inflt. [inflight] Sandy per Mgmt."

9:21: Transport Canada, Canada's transportation agency, activates its Situation Centre (SitCen) in Ottawa.

9:22: United Airlines initiates a lockout of Flight 175. A few moments later, the United Airlines systems operations control manager issues an advisory under United's Chief Operating Officer, Andy Studdert, to all United Airlines facilities. The advisory states that Flight 175 is involved in an accident in New York City.

9:22: Flight 77 passenger Barbara Olson calls her husband, Ted, again. She tells him about the announcement Hanjour made a few minutes earlier and asks "What do I tell the pilot to do?" Ted asks where the plane is, and she tells him that the plane is flying low over a residential area. Ted hears a passenger in the background mention that the plane is flying northeast. Ted tells her about the attacks on the World Trade Center, causing her to go quiet. After they express their feelings toward one another, the call is cut off.

9:22: After hearing about the attacks on the World Trade Center, Melody Homer has an ACARS message sent to her husband, LeRoy, who is Flight 93's first officer, asking if he's okay.

9:23: NEADS scrambles fighters from Langley Air Force Base to go after Flight 11 based on the (erroneous) report that it is still in the air. NEADS also initially decides to have the fighters from Otis Air National Guard Base chase the plane down as well.

9:23: United Airlines flight dispatcher Ed Ballinger's warning message is sent to both Flight 93 and Flight 175, and is received in the cockpit of Flight 93 a minute later. Ballinger is aware that Flight 175 has been hijacked, but he is unaware that it crashed.

9:24–9:38 (approx.): Three people either try to climb down or fall from a 79th floor window, 79–351, at the South Tower's east face close to the southeast corner. Firefighter Danny Suhr is preparing to enter the South Tower when he is struck by a jumper. Suhr and the jumper are both killed instantly. Besides these three individuals, nobody else is seen falling from the South Tower, an obvious dissimilarity from the situation in the North Tower, where more than 100 people fell to their deaths for nearly the entire time it burned.

9:24: The order to scramble fighters from Langley Air Force Base is processed and transmitted by NEADS.

9:24: FAA Headquarters is notified of an emergency onboard Flight 77.

9:24: The FAA notifies NORAD (NEADS) about the suspected hijacking of Flight 77. The FAA and NORAD establish an open line to discuss Flight 77, and shortly thereafter Flight 93.

Shortly after 9:24: NEADS cancels its plan to have the fighters from Otis Air National Guard Base pursue (what they erroneously believe is) Flight 11 out of concern of leaving the New York airspace unprotected.

9:25: The Herndon Command Center informs FAA Headquarters that Flight 77 is lost in Indianapolis Center's airspace.

9:25: Flight 93 is handed off to the FAA's Cleveland Air Route Traffic Control Center (hereinafter "Cleveland Center")

9:25 (approx.) FAA Headquarters tells the Herndon Command Center to "get an awareness up to all the traffic management coordinators or the traffic management units to report any unusual circumstances direct to the Command Center of loss of identification, or any radio, uh, any unusual radio transmissions."

9:25: ABC News correspondent John Nance mentions the possibility of the plane that hit the South Tower being a Boeing 767, among other types of planes.

9:25: The Otis Air National Guard Base-based F-15s establish a Combat Air Patrol over Manhattan.

9:25: A video teleconference begins to be set up in the White House Situation Room, led by Richard A. Clarke, a special assistant to the president, that eventually includes the CIA, the FBI, the departments of State, Justice, and Defense, and the FAA.

9:25: The Associated Press informs CNN that the two plane crashes in the World Trade Center appeared to be an "act of terrorism".

9:25: The Herndon Command Center's National Operations Manager, Ben Sliney, bans takeoffs of all civilian aircraft regardless of destination—a national groundstop.

9:26: White House counterterrorism chief Richard Clarke indicates he gave the instruction to raise the worldwide force protection condition for U.S. military bases at around this time. This is likely the earliest instance this actual order was issued. Other evidence suggests the threat condition increase took place in steps, with the next step occurring sometime over the next hour. See link

9:26: The Cleveland Center controller handling Flight 93 engages other aircraft about the situation in New York and the possibility of landing in Philadelphia.

9:26: Flight 93's pilot, Jason Dahl, replies to United Airlines flight dispatcher Ed Ballinger's text message, "Ed, confirm latest mesg plz - Jason".

9:26: NBC News correspondent Andrea Mitchell reports to MSNBC anchor Lester Holt that a top U.S. government official informed her that one of the two planes that hit the Twin Towers was an American Airlines plane from Boston to Los Angeles that was hijacked.

9:27: The NEADS watch floor reads "Three planes unaccounted for. American Airlines 11 may still be airborne but the flight that - United 175 to the World Trade Center. We're not sure who the other one is."

9:27: Flight 93 passenger Tom Burnett calls his wife, Deena, and they have the following conversation:

Deena: Hello.

Tom: Deena.

Deena: Tom, are you OK?

Tom: No, I'm not. I'm on an airplane that has been hijacked.

Deena: Hijacked?

Tom: Yes, They just knifed a guy.

Deena: A passenger?

Tom: Yes.

Deena: Where are you? Are you in the air?

Tom: Yes, yes, just listen. Our airplane has been hijacked. It's United Flight 93 from Newark to San Francisco. We are in the air. The hijackers have already knifed a guy; one of them has a gun; they are telling us there is a bomb on board; please call the authorities.

Deena promptly calls 911 after the call.

9:27:25: Flight 93 has its last routine communication with Cleveland Center.

9:27: In Italy, terrestrial channel Rai 1 interrupts their schedule to bring live news coverage, receiving coverage from CNN.

9:28:17: Flight 93 suddenly begins to descend as hijackers storm the cockpit and take over the flight. Flight controllers at Cleveland Center hear "unintelligible sounds of possible screaming or a struggle." The flight descends roughly 700 feet before the autopilot corrects the altitude. The hijackers also stab passenger Mark Rothenberg, take flight attendant Deborah Welsh captive in the cockpit, and move the remaining passengers and crew to the back of the plane. Cockpit voice recordings also indicate that pilot Jason Dahl is injured but alive.

9:29: Hanjour disables Flight 77's autopilot and takes manual control of the plane. Flight 77 is approximately 38 miles west of the Pentagon, flying at 7,000 ft.

9:29: The FDNY's Citywide Tour Commander issues a total recall of the Department, ordering all off-duty firefighters in New York City to report to their fire stations.

President Bush addresses parents and teachers at Booker Elementary School on the day's attacks.

9:29: President Bush makes his first public statements about the attacks, in front of an audience of about 200 teachers and students at the elementary school. He states that he will be going back to Washington. "Today, we've had a national tragedy," he starts. "Two airplanes… have crashed… into the World Trade Center… in an apparent terrorist attack on our country," and leads a moment of silence. No one in the President's traveling party has any information during this time that other aircraft were hijacked or missing.

9:30: The fighters from Langley Air Force Base are airborne while NEADS technicians continue to try and locate (what they erroneously believe is) Flight 11 on radar.

9:30 (approx.): American Airlines confirms that Flight 11 crashed into the World Trade Center.

9:30 (approx.): Cleveland Center informs United Airlines that they have lost contact with Flight 93.

9:30: The Cleveland Center controller handling Flight 93 asks other flights on the same frequency if they heard screaming. A few flight respond that they did.

9:30: Reuters reports that a plane was hijacked from Boston.

9:30: In the North Tower, six men escape express elevator Car 69-A. The elevator, which had been designed to traverse much of the building to reach the upper floors more quickly, had gotten stuck at the 50th Floor when Flight 11 hit the tower. With no exit at this floor, window cleaner Jan Demczur used his squeegee to attempt to cut a hole in the Sheetrock lining the elevator shaft. When the squeegee's blade broke off and fell down the elevator shaft, he and the other five people in the elevator alternately used the handle to scrape away at the lining, eventually cutting a hole large enough for them to escape into an adjacent bathroom. They are found by firefighters, who immediately escort them to a stairwell. All six safely leave the tower five minutes before it collapses.

9:31: Dispatchers at United Airlines are informed that there is a potential problem with Flight 93. The airline's air traffic control coordinator and another employee each send an ACARS message to the flight. Flight 93 doesn't reply.

9:31: On C-SPAN, Washington Journal host Steve Scully starts the channel's coverage of the morning's incidents.

9:31:57: Flight 93's cockpit voice recorder begins recording the final 32 minutes of the flight. It picks up Jarrah trying to make the following announcement to the passengers: "Ladies and gentlemen, here is the captain please sit down. Keep remaining [sic] sitting. We have a bomb on board. So sit." Instead, his announcement is broadcast to Cleveland Center, which mistakenly believes it came from Flight 1989. Cleveland Center informs the Herndon Command Center of the transmission.

9:32 (approx.): Controllers at the Dulles TRACON in Virginia observe "a primary radar target tracking eastbound at a high rate of speed", referring to Flight 77. They inform Reagan National Airport of this.

9:32: A flight attendant on Flight 93 calls a United Airlines maintenance facility in San Francisco. The call lasts 95 seconds.

9:32: United Airlines flight dispatcher Ed Ballinger begins sending a new warning to his flights: "High security alert. Secure cockpit."

9:33–9:34: A tower supervisor at Reagan National Airport tells Secret Service operations center at the White House that "an aircraft is coming at you and not talking with us," referring to Flight 77. The White House is about to be evacuated when the tower reports that Flight 77 has turned and is approaching Reagan National Airport.

9:33: United flight dispatcher Ed Ballinger's new warning is sent to Flight 93.

9:34–10:08: The Herndon Command Center provides multiple updates on Flight 93's progress toward Washington, D.C. to FAA Headquarters.

9:34–9:38: Flight 93 climbs to 40,700 ft. Cleveland Center moves other aircraft out of Flight 93's way and tries unsuccessfully to contact the flight.

9:34: Flight 77 is 5 miles west-southwest of the Pentagon when it begins a 330-degree right turn. At the end of the turn, the plane has descended 2,200 ft.

9:34: NBC News Pentagon correspondent Jim Miklaszewski relays information from military sources identifying American Airlines Flight 11 as one of the planes involved in the attacks, having initially thought to have been diverted towards Kennedy Airport.

9:34: NEADS calls Washington Center to update them on the evolving situation. During the call, Washington Center's operations manager informs NEADS that Flight 77 is lost.

9:34: The FAA's Command Center relays information concerning Flight 93 to FAA headquarters.

9:34: Flight 93 passenger Tom Burnett calls his wife, Deena, again, and they have the following conversation:

Deena: Hello.

Tom: They're in the cockpit. The guy they knifed is dead.

Deena: He's dead?

Tom: Yes. I tried to help him, but I couldn't get a pulse.

Deena: Tom, they are hijacking planes all up and down the east coast. They are taking them and hitting designated targets. They've already hit both towers of the World Trade Center.

Tom: They're talking about crashing this plane. (a pause) Oh my God. It's a suicide mission…(he then tells people sitting around him)

Deena: Who are you talking to?

Tom: My seatmate. Do you know which airline is involved?

Deena: No, they don't know if they're commercial airlines or not. The newsreporters are speculating cargo planes, private planes and commercial. No one knows.

Tom: How many planes are there?

Deena: They're not sure; at least three. Maybe more.

Tom: O.K….O.K….Do you know who is involved?

Deena: No.

Tom: We're turning back toward New York. We're going back to the World Trade Center. No, wait, we're turning back the other way. We're going south.

Deena: What do you see?

Tom: Just a minute; I'm looking. I don't see anything; we're over a rural area. It's just fields. I've gotta go.

9:35: The President's motorcade departs from the elementary school, bound for Sarasota-Bradenton International Airport and Air Force One.

9:35: Flight 93 flight attendant Sandra Bradshaw calls a United Airlines maintenance facility in San Francisco. She reports the flight had been hijacked by men with knives who are in the cabin and flight deck and have stabbed another flight attendant, possibly Debbie Welsh. A manager, who took over the call, describes Bradshaw as "shockingly calm." After the call, the manager informs his supervisor, and the supervisor informs the United Airlines crisis center. The manager then instructs the operator, who took the call, to try and reestablish contact with Flight 93. The effort is unsuccessful.

9:35: Based on a report that Flight 77 had turned again and was circling back toward the District of Columbia, the Secret Service orders the immediate evacuation of the Vice President from the White House.

9:35:09: Flight 93 reverses direction over northeast Ohio and starts flying eastwards. During the turn, the hijackers struggle to control a hostage, who is possibly flight attendant Deborah Welsh. She is eventually either killed or silenced.

9:36 (approx.): Reagan National Airport air traffic controllers ask the pilot of a National Guard C-130H cargo aircraft to identify and follow Flight 77.

9:36: Cleveland Center advises the Herndon Command Center that it is still tracking Flight 93 and inquires whether someone had requested the military to launch fighter aircraft to intercept the aircraft, adding that fighters could be scrambled from nearby bases. The Herndon Command Center says that the decision to scramble fighters must come from someone higher up in the chain of command.

9:36: The United Airlines manager of flight dispatch operations informs dispatcher Ed Ballinger that Flight 93 is "off track, heading for D.C." Another flight dispatcher sends an ACARS message to Flight 93: "How's the wx (weather). Can dispatch be of any assistance?"

9:36: Boston Center learns that an unidentified aircraft is 6 mi southeast of the White House and relays this information to NEADS. This prompts the Mission Crew Commander to order an Authorization for Interceptor Operations (AFIO) for the Langley fighters, which puts them under NEADS' control. He then discovers that the fighters have gone east over the ocean rather than north towards Washington, D.C. and orders "Run them to the White House. I don't care how many windows you break."

9:37: Flight 93 passenger Jeremy Glick calls his wife, Lyzbeth, and stays connected until the end of the flight. He tells her the flight is hijacked by three dark-skinned men who look "Iranian", wearing red bandanas and wielding knives, and that the passengers have voted to "rush" the hijackers.

9:37: Vice President Cheney enters a tunnel leading to the Presidential Emergency Operations Center, located under the White House East Wing. His wife Lynne, National Security Advisor Condoleezza Rice, and Transportation Secretary Norman Mineta join him there.

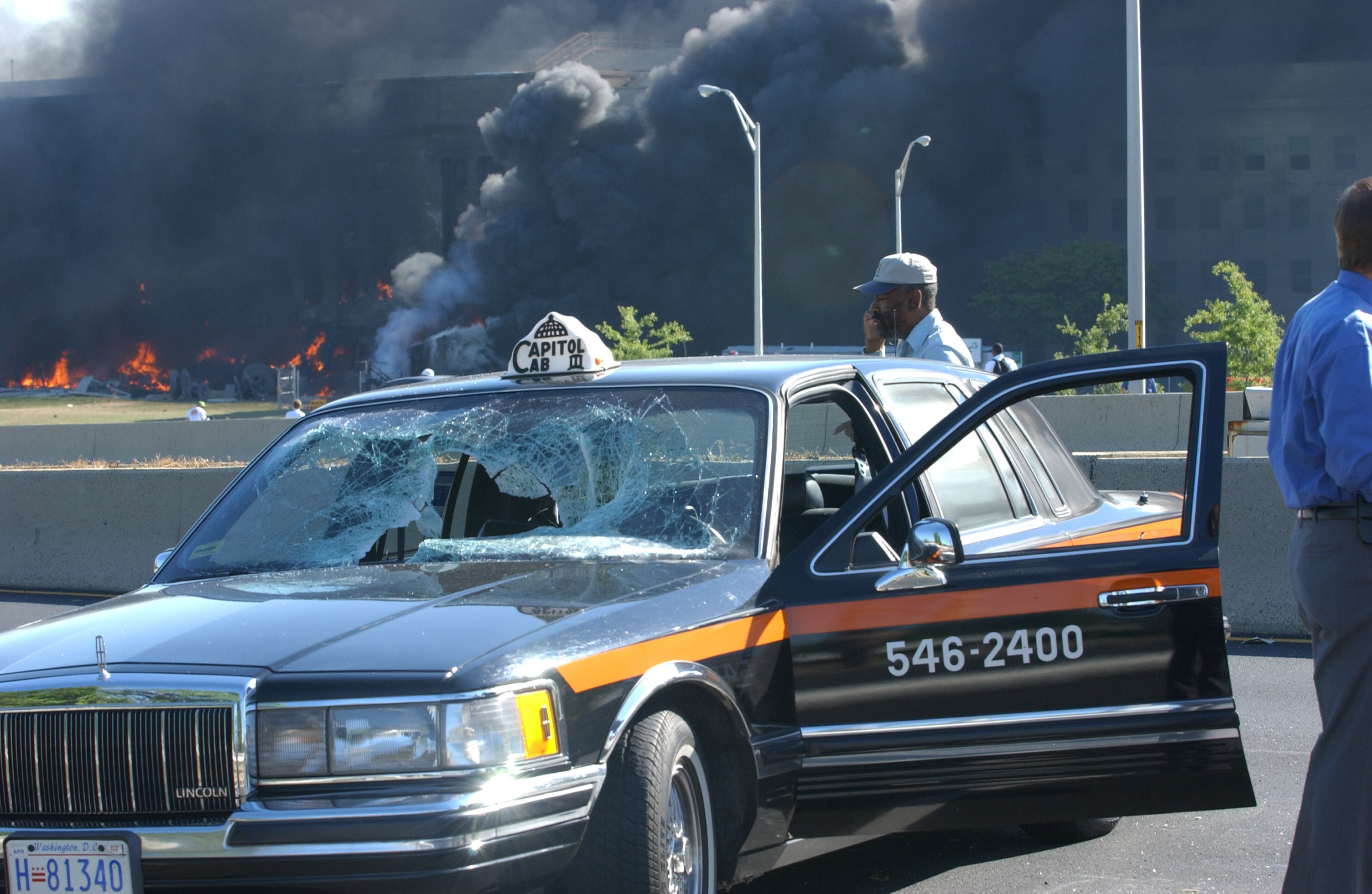
A Lincoln Town Car taxicab was hit by a light pole as American Airlines Flight 77 passed over Washington Boulevard and crashed into the Pentagon.

9:37:46: Flight 77 crashes into the western side of the Pentagon at 530 mph (850 km/h; 240 m/s; 460 kn) and its jet fuel starts a violent fire. The section of the Pentagon hit consists mainly of newly renovated, unoccupied offices. All 64 people on board are killed, as are 125 Pentagon personnel. Prior to crashing, the plane knocks down 5 light poles with its wings (one of which damages its right engine causing smoke to billow from it), and its right engine strikes a generator.

9:38 (approx.): The pilot of the C-130 reports the crash at the Pentagon to Reagan National Airport air traffic controllers.

9:39: Another radio transmission is heard from Ziad Jarrah aboard Flight 93: "Uh, this is the captain. I would like you all to remain seated. We have a bomb on board and are going back to the airport, and to have our demands, so please remain quiet."

9:39: Flight 93 passenger Lauren Grandcolas calls her husband, Jack, and leaves him the following message:

"Honey, are you there? Jack, pick up, sweetie. Okay; well, I just wanted to tell you I love you. We're having a little problem on the plane. I'm totally fine; I just love you more than anything; just know that. And you know, I'm, you know, I'm comfortable and I'm okay... for now. Just a little problem. So I just love you; please tell my family I love them, too. Bye, honey."

9:39:12: NBC News Pentagon correspondent Jim Miklaszewski reports that "it felt, just a few moments ago, like there was an explosion of some kind here at the Pentagon." NBC and MSNBC relay reports of the explosion but do not relay word of the crash of Flight 77, as they do not know the cause.

9:40: United's air traffic control coordinator for West Coast flights informs the Herndon Command Center that Flight 93 is not responding to the airlines attempts to contact it.

9:40: United flight dispatcher Ed Ballinger sends an ACARS message to Flight 93: "High security alert. Secure cockpit. Two airliner hit NY Trade Center. And 1 aircraft in IAD missing. And one in EWR missing...too. UAL 175/93 missing."

9:40: Video teleconference in White House Situation Room begins with the physical security of the President, the White House, and federal agencies. They are not yet aware of the Pentagon crash.

9:40:49: CNN's Breaking News bulletin reads "Reports of fire at Pentagon."

9:40:52: A horn sounds in Flight 93's cockpit, indicating that the autopilot has been disengaged, and the hijackers fiddle with a green knob. "This green knob?" one hijacker asks. "Yes, that's the one." another hijacker responds.

9:41: United flight dispatcher Ed Ballinger resends his 9:40 ACARS message with the following addition at the end: "UAL 175/93 found."

9:41: Flight 93's transponder is turned off. Cleveland Center can still track the plane on primary radar.

9:41: The Herndon Command Centers informs FAA Headquarters that Flight 93 has turned back east and is descending.

9:41: Local Washington, D.C. television station WUSA breaks away from the CBS network, with anchor Andrea Roane beginning the station's local coverage of the explosion at the Pentagon.

9:41:15: Associated Press photographer Richard Drew takes the picture known as The Falling Man.

9:41:56: A wounded person (possibly pilot Jason Dahl) in the cockpit of Flight 93 moans "Oh, man!"

9:42: American Airlines' director of safety programs, who happens to be in Washington, D.C., informs airline officials that "something has hit the Pentagon."

9:42: A manager at the Herndon Command Center provides updates on Flight 93's location and progress to FAA Headquarters.

9:42: ABC News broadcasts its first pictures from Washington, D.C. of heavy smoke, from a perspective on the other side of the Eisenhower Executive Office Building, which is situated a block west of the White House. Peter Jennings confirms a fire at the Pentagon two minutes later.

9:42: The main CBS network reports an explosion at the Pentagon. Bryant Gumbel is the first newscaster to speculate the possibility of a plane crash.

9:42: The Herndon Command Center learns of the Pentagon crash from news reports. Senior FAA traffic manager Ben Sliney issues the execution order for the Plan for the Security Control of Air Traffic and Air Navigation Aids (SCATANA) grounding all air traffic over the United States and diverting any incoming international traffic to alternate destinations.

9:43: Flight 93 passenger Joseph DeLuca calls his father, informing him that his flight had been hijacked.

9:43: Fox News correspondent David Asman reports, "We - we are hearing - right now that another explosion that - has taken place. At the Pentagon."

9:43: Abu Dhabi TV reports it received a call from the Democratic Front for the Liberation of Palestine, claiming responsibility for the World Trade Center attack, but this is soon denied by a senior officer of the group.

9:43: The White House and the Capitol are evacuated and closed.

9:44: Flight 93 passenger Todd Beamer tries to call his wife, Lisa, but is routed to GTE airphone operator Lisa Jefferson. He tells the operator the flight has been hijacked, that two people, who he thinks are the pilots, are on the floor, dead or injured, and one of the hijackers has a bomb strapped to his waist. When the plane turns sharply south, Beamer repeatedly exclaims "We're going down!" At the end of the call, he tells her that some passengers are planning to "jump" the hijacker with the bomb. They recited the Lord's Prayer and Psalm 23 together, and Beamer asks Jefferson to tell his family that he loves them. He then asks the people around him "Are you ready? Okay. Let's roll."

Sometime between 9:45 and 9:50: A United Airlines station operations control manager receives a report from the airline's San Francisco maintenance facility about Flight 93 flight attendant Sandra Bradshaw's call to the facility about the hijacking. He immediately passes this on to flight dispatcher Ed Ballinger and the airline's crisis center and attempts to initiate a lockout of Flight 93. However, he is unable to do so because the computer system cannot support two lockouts simultaneously.

9:45: Flight 93 passenger Tom Burnett calls his wife, Deena, a third time, and they have the following conversation:

Tom: Deena

Deena: Tom, you're OK.

Tom: No, I'm not.

Deena: They just hit the Pentagon.

Tom: (tells people sitting around him "They just hit the Pentagon.")

Tom: OK...OK. What else can you tell me?

Deena: They think five airplanes have been hijacked. One is still on the ground. They believe all of them are commercial planes. I haven't heard them say which airline, but all of them have originated on the east coast.

Tom: Do you know who is involved?

Deena: No.

Tom: What is the probability of their having a bomb on board? I don't think they have one. I think they're just telling us that for crowd control.

Deena: A plane can survive a bomb if it's in the right place.

Tom: Did you call the authorities?

Deena: Yes, they didn't know anything about your plane.

Tom: They're talking about crashing this plane into the ground. We have to do something. I'm putting a plan together.

Deena: Who's helping you?

Tom: Different people. Several people. There's a group of us. Don't worry. I'll call you back.

9:45: An American Airlines official calls United Airlines and informs them that a plane has hit the Pentagon and that American believes that the plane was a US Airways turbojet.

9:45: United States airspace is shut down. No civilian aircraft are allowed to take off, and all aircraft in flight are ordered to land at the nearest airport as soon as possible. Nearly all international flights headed for the U.S. (those are from Europe and Asia, mainly Far East bound flights) are redirected to Canada, while some flights from South America are diverted to Mexico and the Dominican Republic, and few flights from Australia or New Zealand are also diverted to Hawaii. Transport Canada orders a complete closedown of Canadian airspace, but the Mexican airspace does not shut down. The FAA announces that civilian flights are suspended until at least noon September 12, while Transport Canada gives similar orders; the FAA further ordered that diverted U.S.-bound international flights should be taken in, launching the agency's "Operation Yellow Ribbon", with CFB Goose Bay being the first Canadian air facility to receive airliners originally bound for the U.S. Other airports across Canada received varying numbers of airliners; Gander International Airport in Gander, Newfoundland hosted 38 planes, consisting of 6,122 passengers and 473 crew, the second largest number out of any Canadian airport other than Halifax. The groundings would eventually last until September 14. Military and medical flights as well as Con Air flights continue. This is the fourth time all commercial flights in the U.S. have been stopped, and the first time a suspension was unplanned. All previous suspensions were military-related (Sky Shield I-III), from 1960 to 1962. Many newspapers (including The New York Times) mistakenly print that this is the first time flights have been suspended. This was, however, the first time commercial flights in Canada were stopped.

9:45: CNN receives initial reports that, in addition to a fire at the Pentagon, there is also a fire at the National Mall. These reports on the National Mall, however, are later proven to be false.

9:46: An ACARS message is sent to Flight 93 from San Francisco, "Heard report of incident. Plz confirm all is normal." Flight 93 does not reply.

9:46: Flight 93 passenger Linda Gronlund calls her sister, Elsa Strong, and leaves the following message:

"Elsa, it's Lynn [sic]. Um. I only have a minute. I'm on United 93, and it's been hijacked, uh, by terrorists, who say they have a bomb. Apparently, they, uh, flown a couple of planes into the World Trade Center already, and it looks like they're going to take this one down as well. Mostly, I just wanted to say I love you . . . and . . . I'm going to miss you . . . and . . . and please give my love to Mom and Dad, and (sigh) mostly, I just love you and I just wanted to tell you that. I don't know if I'm going to get the chance to tell you that again or not. (sigh) Um. . . (unintelligible) All my stuff is in the safe. The uh, the safe is in my closet in my bedroom. The combination is: you push C for clear and then 0-9-1-3 and then, uh, and then it should . . . and maybe pound, and then it should unlock. (sigh) I love you, and I hope that I can talk to you soon. Bye."

9:46: The Herndon Command Center informs FAA Headquarters that Flight 93 is 29 minutes from Washington, D.C.

9:46:36: The ARD news magazine Tagesthemen, hosted by Ulrich Wickert, broadcasts news of the attacks to Germany.

9:47: Flight 93 attendant CeeCee Lyles calls her husband and leaves him the following message:

"Hi, Baby. I'm... Baby, you have to listen to me carefully. I'm on a plane that's been hijacked. I'm on the plane. I'm calling from the plane. I want to tell you I love you. Please tell my children that I love them very much, and I'm so sorry, babe. Umm. I don't know what to say. There's three guys. They've hijacked the plane. I'm trying to be calm. We're turned around, and I've heard that there's planes that's been, been flown into the World Trade Center. I hope to be able to see your face again, baby. I love you. Goodbye."

9:47: Flight 1989 lands safely in Cleveland.

9:48: Flight 93 passenger Mark Bingham calls his mother, Alice Hoagland. He tells her that the plane has been taken over by men who have a bomb and says "I love you very, very much."

9:49: The Herndon Command Center suggests that someone at FAA headquarters should decide whether to request military assistance with Flight 93. Ultimately, the FAA makes no request before it crashes.

9:49: Flight 93 passenger Marion Britton calls her friend, Fred Fiumano. He recalls her saying "We're gonna. They're gonna kill us, you know, We're gonna die." He responds: "Don't worry; they hijacked the plane; they're gonna take you for a ride, you go to their country, and you come back. You stay there for vacation."

9:50 (approx.): The Associated Press reports that Flight 11 was apparently hijacked after departure from Boston's Logan Airport. Within an hour this is confirmed for both Flight 11 and Flight 175.

9:50: Flight 93 flight attendant Sandra Bradshaw calls her husband, Phil. During the call, she tells him that she is heating water to throw at the hijackers. She ends the call saying "Everyone is running up to first class. I've got to go. Bye."

9:50: United flight dispatcher Ed Ballinger sends ACARS messages to the airlines transcontinental flights, including Flight 93 advising them to "land at the nearest UAL airport-ORD terrorist. No one in the cockpit-Land asap." He sends a second message advising the flights to land anywhere as soon as possible. He sends the message again a minute later.

9:51: An eyewitness relates to WUSA in Washington, D.C. her observation of the plane hitting the Pentagon being an American Airlines Boeing 757 that was approaching from along Columbia Pike (Virginia State Route 244) and hit the building on the side near the heliport.

9:51: Chief Orio Palmer of the FDNY's 7th Battalion reaches the 78th Floor Sky Lobby of the South Tower along with Fire Marshal Ronald Bucca. Palmer reports that there are two pockets of fire and numerous dead bodies.

9:52: The National Security Agency intercepts a phone call between a known associate of Osama bin Laden in Afghanistan and someone in the Republic of Georgia, the former announcing that he had heard "good news", and that another target was still to be hit.

9:53: Flight 93 passenger Honor Elizabeth Wainio calls her stepmother. She ends the call by saying "I have to go. They're breaking into the cockpit. I love you. Goodbye."

9:53: FAA Headquarters informs the Herndon Command Center that the Deputy Director for Air Traffic Services is discussing scrambling fighters after Flight 93 with Deputy Administrator Monte Belger.

9:53: CNN confirms a plane crash at the Pentagon.

9:54: Flight 93 passenger Tom Burnett calls his wife, Deena, a final time, and they have the following conversation:

Deena: Tom?

Tom: Hi. Anything new?

Deena: No.

Tom: Where are the kids?

Deena: They're fine. They're sitting at the table having breakfast. They're asking to talk to you.

Tom: Tell them I'll talk to them later.

Deena: I called your parents. They know your plane has been hijacked.

Tom: Oh…you shouldn't have worried them. How are they doing?

Deena: They're OK... Mary and Martha are with them.

Tom: Good. (a long quiet pause) We're waiting until we're over a rural area. We're going to take back the airplane.

Deena: No! Sit down, be still, be quiet, and don't draw attention to yourself!

Tom: Deena! If they're going to crash this plane into the ground, we're going to have do something!

Deena: What about the authorities?

Tom: We can't wait for the authorities. I don't know what they could do, anyway. It's up to us. I think we can do it.

Deena: What do you want me to do?

Tom: Pray, Deena, just pray.

Deena: (after a long pause) I love you.

Tom: Don't worry, we're going to do something.

9:55: A CNN correspondent mentions Osama bin Laden as someone determined to strike the US.

9:55: Air Force One leaves Sarasota-Bradenton International Airport.

9:55:11: Jarrah tunes the air navigation receiver in the cockpit to the frequency for the VOR at Reagan National Airport (Note: 111 MHz.) to direct Flight 93 toward Washington, D.C.

9:56: The Herndon Command Center informs FAA Headquarters that they have lost track of Flight 93 over the Pittsburgh area. Seconds later, the Command Center relocates the plane and informs Headquarters of this.

9:57: The passenger revolt begins on Flight 93. A hijacker asks "Is there something? A fight?" The hijackers then roll the plane from side to side.

9:57: President Bush leaves Sarasota, Florida, on Air Force One. The plane reaches cruising altitude and circles for approximately 40 minutes while the destination of the plane is discussed.

9:58: Flight 93 passenger Edward Felt calls 911 from a lavatory at the back of the plane. He has the following conversation with a dispatcher at the Westmoreland County 911 Center in Greensburg, Pennsylvania:

Caller: "Highjacking in pro----"

911: "Excuse me? Hey, somebody's reporting a—"

Caller: "Highjacking in progress."

911: "Sir, I'm losing you; where are you at?"

Caller: "United flight 93."

911: "Wait a minute; wait; United—night flight—United flight. United flight 93."

Caller: "Hijacking in progress!"

911: "Okay, where you at up? Where are you at up?"

Caller: "I'm in the bathroom, United flight 93."

911: "Okay, where are you at?"

Caller: "I don't know."

911: "Where are you at?"

Caller: "I don't know where the plane is."

911: "Where did you take off at?"

Caller: "Newark to San Francisco."

911: "Newark to San Francisco."

Caller: "United flight 93."

911: "I got it, okay stay on the phone with me, sir."

Caller: "I'm trying to . . . (unintelligible) at the bathroom. I don't know what's going on."

911: "Hey; somebody get the FAA; Newark to San Francisco, and they got a highjacking in progress. Okay, yeah. Dude, get somebody from the airport on the line. This is a highjacking in progress. Are you still there, sir?"

Caller: "Yes, I am."

911: "What's your name, sir?"

Caller: "EDWARD FELT."

911: "EDWARD FELT? What's your phone number, sir?"

Caller: "[Phone number redacted]"

911: "Go ahead."

Caller: "[Phone number redacted]"

911: "Go ahead"

Caller: "[Phone number redacted]"

911: "How big of a plane, sir?"

Caller: "It's like a seven-fifty-seven (757)."

911: "This is a seven-fifty-seven (757). Hey, we need. It's a seven-fifty-seven (757). Sir, sir?"

Caller: "Yes."

911: "Okay, how many peoples on the plane?"

Caller: "It was—it was pretty empty, maybe (unintelligible)."

911: "Can you still hear me, sir? Sir, sir, can you still hear me? It's over (unintelligible). There's a plane... said the plane's going down. It's over Mt. Pleasant Township somewhere. Sir? It's going down. You better make an announcement on (unintelligible). It's over Mt. Pleasant somewhere. Hello?"

9:58: Flight 93 flight attendant CeeCee Lyles calls her husband again. This time, she is able to talk to him, and she tells him that the plane has been hijacked, and passengers are forcing their way into the cockpit.

9:58:57: A hijacker on Flight 93 says "They want to get in there. Hold, hold from the inside. Hold from the inside. Hold."

9:59: The South Tower of the World Trade Center collapses, 56 minutes (Note: NIST and the 9/11 Commission both state that the collapse began at 9:58:59 a.m., which is rounded to 9:59 for simplicity. If the Commission's claim that the South Tower was struck at 9:03:11 is to be believed, then the collapse began 55 minutes and 48 seconds after the crash, not 56 minutes.) after the impact of Flight 175. Its destruction is viewed and heard by a vast television and radio audience. As the roar of the collapse goes silent, tremendous gray-white clouds of pulverized concrete and gypsum rush through the streets. Most observers think a new explosion or impact has produced smoke and debris that now obscures the South Tower, but once the wind clears the smoke, it becomes clear that the building is no longer standing. No one who is still inside the South Tower at the time of its collapse survives. NY1 correspondent Kristen Shaughnessy, on the scene of the disaster, reports on the collapse of the South Tower at the instant it begins, while ABC News correspondent Don Dahler, who was home at the time of the incident and lived near the site, reports to anchor Peter Jennings on air that he has witnessed the tower collapse; Dahler's report is perhaps the first broadcast specific confirmation of a collapse as his report is filed seconds after the event. The collapse generates 2.1 magnitude seismic waves.

9:59: As the South Tower collapses, Father Mychal Judge, OFM, chaplain to the FDNY, is struck by falling debris on the lobby level of the North Tower. He dies of blunt force trauma to the head. He is found by Chief Pfeifer, Jules Naudet, and others from the North Tower Command Post who fled when they heard the South Tower collapse and took refuge in the nearby escalator as the debris cloud engulfed them. As Judge's body is the first recovered and certified by the medical examiner's office, he will be designated "Victim 0001" of the September 11 attacks.

9:59:52: Jarrah changes tactics and pitches Flight 93's nose up and down.

=== 10:00 a.m. ===
10:00: FDNY Battalion Chief Joseph Pfeifer (inside of the still standing North Tower) orders all FDNY personnel to evacuate, via radio.

Battalion 1 Chief (Chief Pfeifer): Command post, Tower 1, all units. Evacuate the building. Command post, to all units.

Due to many communication limitations, numerous firefighters within the tower do not receive this transmission. Some personnel who do not hear the order only leave the building after being told by other firefighters that an evacuation order has been given. Others never receive the order at all.

10:00 (approx.) The fighters from Langley Air Force Base establish a Combat Air Patrol over Washington, D.C.

10:00: The Herndon Command Center informs FAA Headquarters that "United ninety three was spotted by a VFR at eight thousand feet, eleven, eleven miles south of Indianhead, just north of Cumberland, Maryland."

10:00:03: Jarrah stabilizes Flight 93.

10:00:07: A hijacker in the cockpit of Flight 93 asks "Is that it? Shall we finish it off?" Another hijacker responds "No, not yet. When they all come, we finish it off."

10:00:25: A passenger on Flight 93 says "In the cockpit. If we don't, we'll die."

10:00:42: A passenger on Flight 93 shouts "Roll it!" This is followed by sounds of the food cart being rammed against the cockpit door.

10:01: The FAA Command Center advises FAA headquarters that an aircraft had seen Flight 93 "waving his wings," the hijackers' efforts to defeat the passengers' counterattack.

10:01:00: Jarrah stabilizes Flight 93 again. After reciting the takbir twice, he asks another hijacker "Is that it? I mean, shall we put it down?" The other hijacker responds "Yes, put it in it, and pull it down."

10:02: Communicators with the Vice President in the Presidential Emergency Operations Center begin receiving reports from the Secret Service of an inbound aircraft—presumably hijacked—heading toward Washington. This is Flight 93.

10:02: CNN announces that the Sears Tower in Chicago has been evacuated.

10:02:33: Jarrah repeatedly says "Give it to me!" in Arabic, referring to Flight 93's yoke.

10:03 (approx.): The National Military Command Center learns from the White House of Flight 93's hijacking.

10:03:09: The last entry on Flight 93's cockpit voice recorder is made: a passenger says "No." while a hijacker repeatedly recites the takbir.

10:03:11: Flight 93 crashes at 583 mph (938 km/h; 261 m/s; 507 kn) 80 miles (130 km) southeast of Pittsburgh in Somerset County, Pennsylvania, concluding the attacks. Later reports indicate that passengers had learned about the World Trade Center and Pentagon crashes on cell phones and at least three were planning on resisting the hijackers; the resistance was confirmed by Flight 93's cockpit voice recording, on which the hijackers are heard making their decision to down the plane before the passengers succeed in breaching the cockpit door. The terrorists are believed to have been aiming for the White House or the U.S. Capitol Building, both of which had been evacuated and closed 18 minutes before Flight 93 went down. The flight was still at between 10 and 20 minutes away from D.C. at the time of its crash.

10:05: Andrea Mitchell, reporting for NBC from outside the Pentagon, reports that Osama bin Laden may have been involved in the attacks.

10:05: CNN's headlines read: "SOUTH TOWER AT WTC COLLAPSES."

10:05: The IDS Center in Minneapolis is evacuated.

10:06: First responders arrive at Flight 93's crash site.

10:07: NBC reports for the first time that the South Tower of the World Trade Center has collapsed. Prior to this time they have said only that a section of the building has fallen away.

10:07: NEADS, controlling the only set of fighters over Washington, first learns of the hijacking of Flight 93, 4 minutes after it actually crashed.

10:08: The Herndon Command Center reports to FAA headquarters that Flight 93 may be down near Johnstown, Pennsylvania; at 10:17 the Command Center concludes it is so.

10:10–10:15 (approx.): Vice President Cheney, unaware that Flight 93 has crashed, authorizes fighter aircraft to engage the inbound plane, reported to be 80 miles (130 km) from Washington, based not on radar (from which it has disappeared) but speed and trajectory projections.

10:10: United flight dispatcher Ed Ballinger sends an ACARS message to Flight 93: "Don't divert t DC. Not an option." He resends the message a minute later.

10:10: British Prime Minister Tony Blair makes his first comments on the attacks at a meeting of the Trades Union Congress in Brighton, calling the attacks "the new evil in our world today".

10:10: National Military Command Center directs Threat Condition Delta for U.S. military bases worldwide.

10:10: Part of the west side of the Pentagon collapses.

10:10: NEADS emphatically tells fighter pilots over Washington, "Negative clearance to shoot." [i.e. they were not authorized to shoot.]

10:11 (approx.): The NEADS Mission Crew Commander learns of Flight 93 having a bomb on board. He tries to find fighters to scramble after the plane. He contacts an Air National Guard Unit in Syracuse, New York and asks them to expedite the process of launching aircraft. The unit reports that they can have aircraft with loaded guns launched in "approximately 15 minutes."

10:13–10:22: The 9/11 Commission's estimated arrival of Flight 93 over Washington had it not crashed in Pennsylvania.

10:13: The FAA's command center informs FAA headquarters of Flight 93's crash.

10:13: Thousands are involved in an evacuation of the United Nations complex in New York.

10:14–10:19: A lieutenant colonel at the White House repeatedly relays to the NMCC that the Vice President has confirmed that fighters are cleared to engage inbound aircraft if they can verify that the aircraft was hijacked.

10:15: CNN's headline reads, "EXPLOSION ON CAPITOL HILL."

10:15: Five stories of part of the Pentagon collapse due to the fire. The damaged section burned for 38 minutes after the impact of Flight 77.

10:15: NEADS contacts Washington Center seeking information about Flight 93. Washington Center says that the plane has crashed.

10:15: United Airlines confirms that a plane has crashed near Johnstown Pennsylvania and that it believes that Flight 93 may have been involved.

10:17: United Airlines Chief Operating Officer Andy Studdert sends an operational alert message to airline personnel: "UAL 93-11 EWR-SFO has been involved in an accident. Crisis Center has been activated."

10:18: NBC reports that Yasser Arafat, Chairman of the Palestine Liberation Organization (PLO), has denied complicity in the attacks and is appalled by them.

10:20: President Bush, aboard Air Force One, tells Vice President Cheney that he has authorized a shootdown of aircraft if necessary.

10:21 A list to the south at the top of the North Tower to the South is noted by an NYPD Helicopter pilot and eyewitnesses, determined to be caused by support beams being exposed to extreme heat.

10:23: The Associated Press reports a car bomb has exploded outside the State Department Headquarters in Washington, D.C. This and several other reports of terrorist acts in the capital are quickly found to be false.

10:24: Two men who were being evacuated through the underground shopping mall below the South Tower when it collapsed on them are able to climb up through thirty feet of debris to safety. 1010 WINS in New York City reports an explosion at the U.S. Supreme Court building. This is later revealed to be erroneous.

10:27: United Airlines informs American Airlines of Flight 93's crash.

10:28: The North Tower of the World Trade Center collapses. Due to the destruction of the gypsum-encased stairwells on the impact floors (unlike most skyscraper stairwells, which are encased in reinforced concrete), no one who was above the 91st floor in the North Tower escapes the collapse. Unlike the South Tower's collapse, which killed everyone still inside the building, 16 individuals who were inside the collapsing North Tower survived and would later be rescued. The Marriott Hotel, located at the base of the two towers, is also destroyed. 2.3 magnitude seismic waves are observed at Lamont-Doherty, and less intense waves are detected as far away as Lisbon, New Hampshire. The second collapse is also viewed live on television and heard on radio. The North Tower collapses 1 hour and 42 minutes after the impact of Flight 11—the building had continued burning even after the attacks ended with the crash of Flight 93. The cascade of debris from that collapse gouges out a portion of the south side of 7 World Trade Center and sets the bottom of the building on fire. New York City's 1010 WINS reports the collapse live as it happens, broadcasting a live phone call with WINS news director Ben Mevorach, who witnessed the collapse from the Manhattan Bridge. On NBC News, Katie Couric says: "The other tower of the World Trade Center has just collapsed."

Several long-distance videos of the collapse, such as from CNN, are able to show that, after the cloud of dust partially clears away, a portion of the building remains standing. It appears to be the lower half of the northwest corner column of the North Tower, which, like a spire, grows larger and has more structure still standing near the bottom. The portion rises to a fairly good height, nearly forty stories off the ground, considering the collapse around it. This piece remains standing for roughly fifteen seconds after the initial collapse before it also comes down. The debris cloud from the North Tower's collapse is also significantly larger and more far-reaching than that of the South Tower's, due to dust from that collapse being kicked up as the North Tower falls.

10:30 (approx.) American Airlines confirms that Flight 77 crashed into the Pentagon.

10:31: NORAD first communicates the Vice President's shootdown authority to NEADS.

10:35: Air Force One, carrying the President, turns for Barksdale Air Force Base in Bossier City, Louisiana.

10:37: Associated Press reports that officials at the Somerset County Airport confirm that a large plane has crashed in western Pennsylvania. CNN's Aaron Brown passes along reports that a 747 is "down" in Pennsylvania. He stresses these reports are unconfirmed. He also, in the confusion, reports another plane heading for the Pentagon. The Mall of America in Bloomington, Minnesota, is evacuated and closed. New York City's 1010 WINS relays a report that the U.S. State Department headquarters in Washington, D.C. has been attacked by a car bomb. This is later reported to be false.

10:39: Another hijacked airliner is claimed to be headed for Washington, D.C. F-15s are scrambled and patrol the airspace above Washington, D.C. while other fighter jets sweep the airspace above New York City. They have orders, first issued by Vice President Cheney and later confirmed by President Bush, to shoot down any potentially dangerous planes that do not comply with orders given to them via radio. Eventually, the aircraft is revealed to be a medevac helicopter on its way to the Pentagon.

10:41: NBC News confirms that a plane has "gone down" in Somerset County. The earlier unconfirmed statements about an incident at the State Department in Washington, D.C. are reported as false.

10:43: CNN reports that a mass evacuation of Washington, D.C., and New York has been started. A few minutes later, New York mayor Rudy Giuliani orders an evacuation of Lower Manhattan.

10:48: CBC News broadcasts the first statement on the attacks from Prime Minister of Canada Jean Chrétien, who says that Canada "[stands] ready to provide any assistance that our American friends may need at this very difficult hour and in subsequent investigations", and with his wife Aline, offers "on behalf of all Canadians, our deepest sympathies to the families of the victims and to the American people."

10:49: Fox News is the first of the United States news networks to implement a news ticker at the bottom of its screen for supplementary information about the attacks. CNN adds one at 11:11, and MSNBC adds one at approximately 2:00 p.m. All three cable networks have used a news ticker continuously in the years since, and many local television stations have followed suit.

10:53: New York City's mayoral primary elections are canceled.

10:53: Defense Secretary Donald Rumsfeld orders the U.S. military placed at DEFCON 3, for the first time since the Yom Kippur War in 1973.

=== 11:00 a.m. ===
11:00: Local New York television station WWOR-TV anchor Rolland Smith starts the station's coverage of the day's events.

11:00: Transport Canada halts all aircraft departures until further notice, except for police, military, and humanitarian flights, as part of Operation Yellow Ribbon. The operation was well underway as international flights headed for the U.S. had already started to land at Canadian airports, beginning at CFB Goose Bay. Fourteen other airports follow, including Halifax, Lester B. Pearson in Toronto, Montréal-Dorval, and Vancouver.

11:05: The FAA confirms that several planes have been hijacked in addition to American Airlines Flight 11.

11:08: The pilot of Korean Air Flight 85 includes the letters "HJK" a code for hijacked, in an airline text message.

11:18: American Airlines confirms the loss of its two aircraft.

11:26: United Airlines confirms the loss of Flight 93 and states that it is "deeply concerned" about Flight 175.

11:55: The border between the U.S. and Mexico is on highest alert, but is not closed.

11:59: United Airlines confirms the loss of its two aircraft.

=== 12:00 p.m. ===
12:00: ARINC officials notify NORAD about the use of the hijack code on Flight 85.

12:01: (approx.): Fourteen people, including twelve firefighters, who were in a section of a stairwell in the North Tower that held together during the collapse, climb the stairs to the top of the Ground Zero rubble field.

12:04: Los Angeles International Airport, the intended destination of Flights 11, 77 and 175, is shut down.

12:15: San Francisco International Airport, the intended destination of Flight 93, is shut down.

12:15 (approx.): The airspace over the 48 contiguous United States is clear of all commercial and private flights.

12:30 (approx.): Secretary of State Colin Powell boards a plane in Lima, Peru, for Washington, D.C.

12:39: On CNN, Senator John McCain (R-AZ) characterizes the attacks as an "act of war."

12:41: Senator Orrin Hatch (R-UT) tells CNN, "Both the FBI and our intelligence community believe that this is Bin Laden's signature."

=== 1:00 p.m. ===
President George W. Bush addressing reporters from Barksdale Air Force Base in Louisiana.

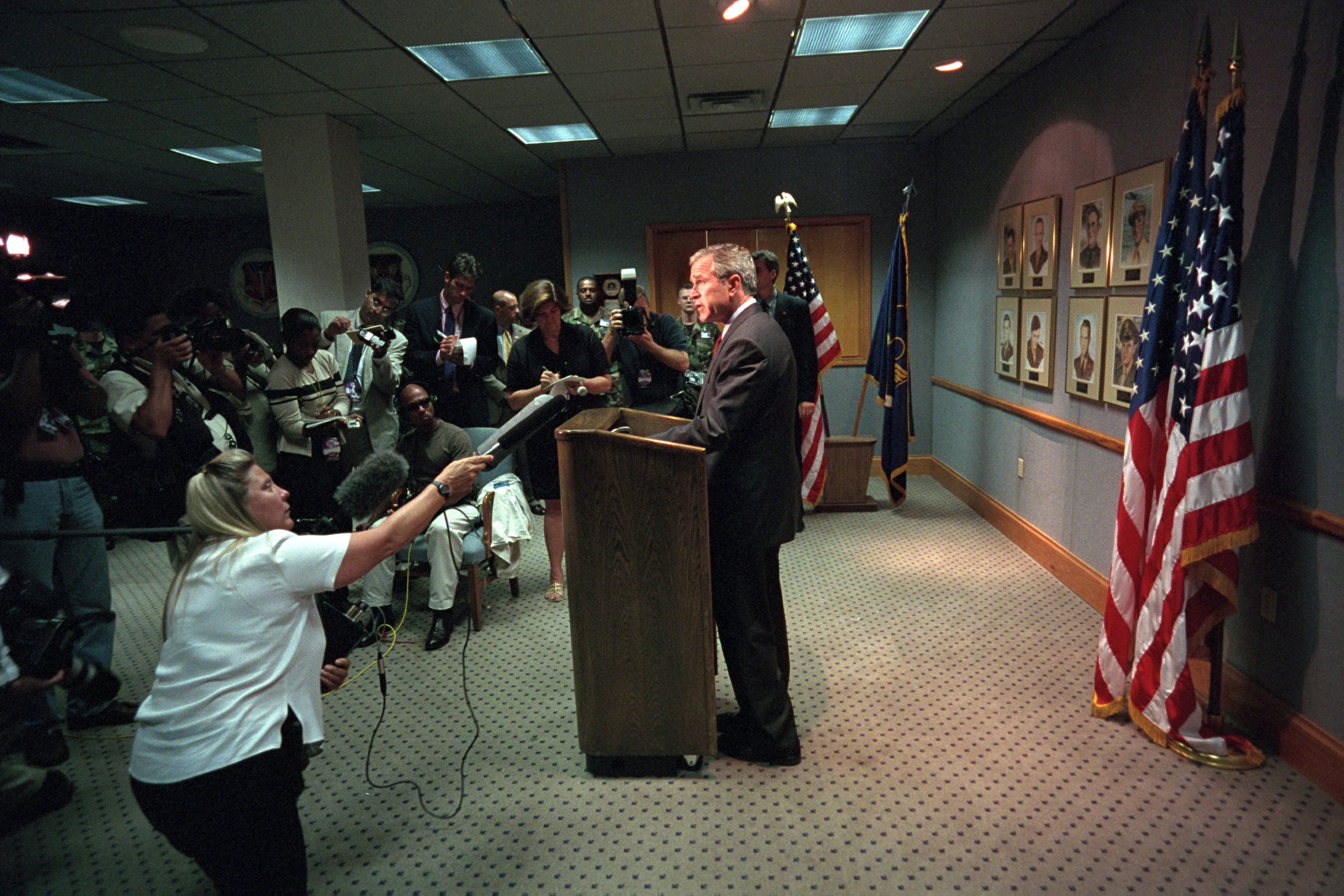
President George W. Bush addressing reporters from Barksdale Air Force Base in Louisiana.

President George W. Bush addressing reporters from Barksdale Air Force Base in Louisiana.

1:00: DIY Network, Food Network, and HGTV suspend their programming schedules as a result of the terrorist attacks.

1:00 (approx.): At the Pentagon, fire crews are still fighting fires. The early response to the attack had been coordinated from the National Military Command Center, but that had to be evacuated when it began to fill with smoke.

1:00 (approx.): Jets are scrambled from Elmendorf Air Force Base to shadow Flight 85.

1:04: President Bush puts the U.S. military on high alert worldwide (known as Force Protection Condition Delta). Taped remarks from the President were aired from Barksdale Air Force Base, stating that "freedom itself was attacked this morning by a faceless coward and freedom will be defended." He also said that the "United States will hunt down and punish those responsible for these cowardly acts." He then leaves for a U.S. Strategic Command bunker located at Offutt Air Force Base in Bellevue, Nebraska.

1:18: Former New York City Emergency Management director Jerome Hauer tells CBS News anchor Dan Rather of the possibility of another large building adjacent to the site of the Twin Towers collapsing.

1:24: ATC instructs Flight 85 to change its transponder code to 7500, the universal signal for hijack, expecting that, if they had not been hijacked, the pilots would respond to that effect. Instead, they simply comply with the instruction, which ATC takes as confirmation that the flight has indeed been hijacked.

1:27: Mayor Anthony A. Williams of Washington, D.C., declares a state of emergency; the District of Columbia National Guard arrives on site.

1:35: American Airlines Flight 77 was scheduled to have landed at Los Angeles International Airport around this time.

=== 2:00 p.m. ===
2:04: American Airlines Flight 11 was scheduled to have landed at Los Angeles International Airport around this time.

2:19: United Airlines Flight 175 was scheduled to have landed at Los Angeles International Airport around this time.

2:32: United Airlines Flight 93 was scheduled to have landed at San Francisco International Airport around this time.

2:39: At a press conference New York Mayor Rudy Giuliani is asked to estimate the number of casualties at the World Trade Center. He replies, "More than any of us can bear."

2:45 (approx.) Alerted that a possible hijacked plane might strike a target in Alaska, Governor Tony Knowles orders the evacuation of potential targets.

2:50: President Bush arrives at Offutt Air Force Base, Bellevue, Nebraska, to convene a National Security Council teleconference via the U.S. STRATCOM bunker.

2:54: Flight 85 lands safely in Whitehorse. On the tarmac, Flight 85 was greeted by armed Royal Canadian Mounted Police officers who, after interrogating the pilots, learned the whole ordeal was caused by a translation error.

=== 3:00 p.m. ===
3:00 (approx.): Pasquale Buzzelli, who lost consciousness in a North Tower stairway during the collapse, awakens to find himself lying atop the debris with only a fractured foot.

3:30 (approx.): Director of Central Intelligence George Tenet reports to Bush that he is very certain that bin Laden and his associates were the perpetrators, mentioning that U.S. intelligence had checked the flight manifest of Flight 77, and found three names of known al-Qaeda members.

=== 4:00 p.m. ===
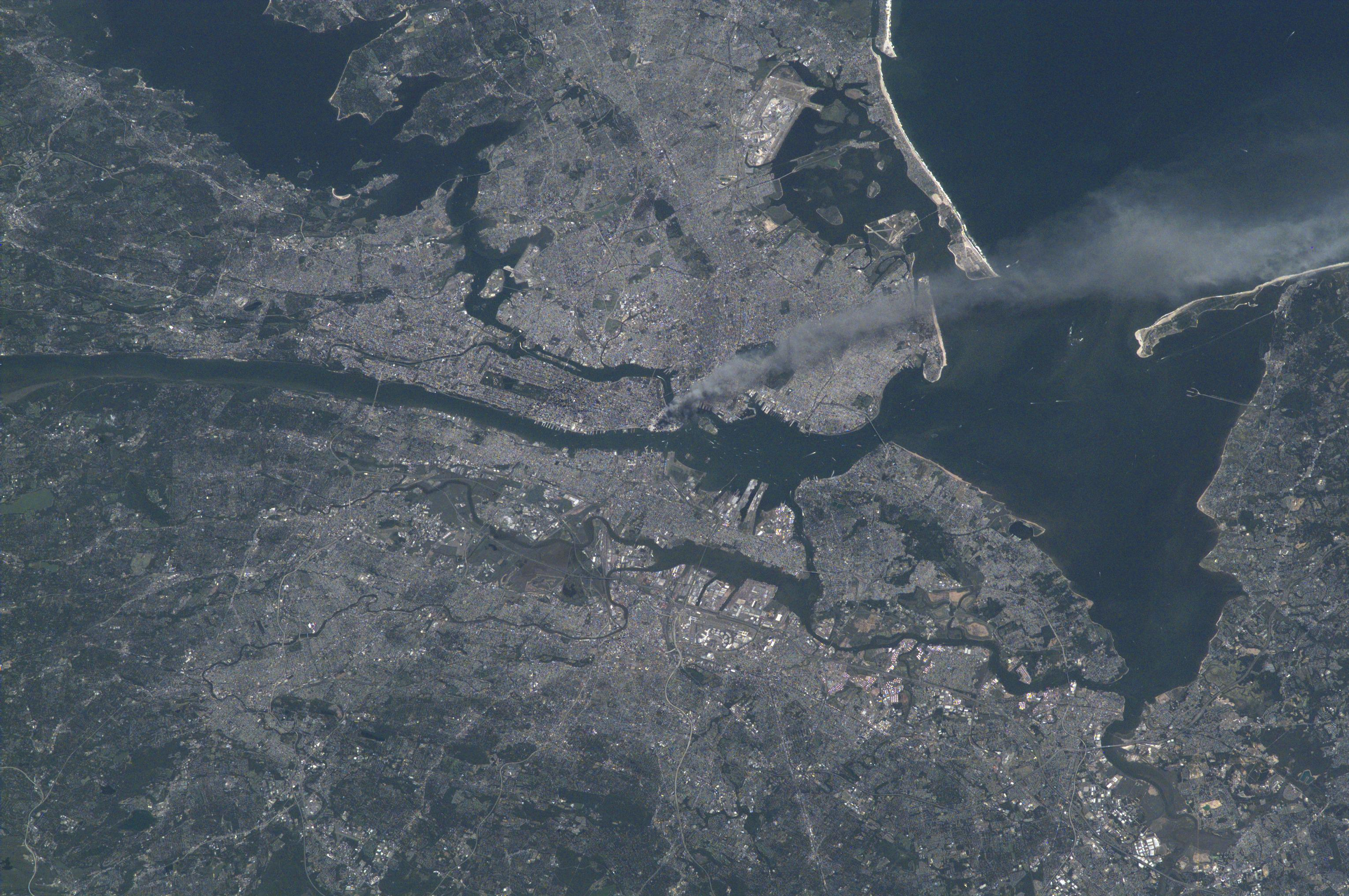
Smoke plume emanating from the World Trade Center as seen from the ISS

4:00: National news outlets report that high officials in the federal intelligence community are stating that Osama bin Laden is suspect number one.

4:25: The New York Stock Exchange, NASDAQ, and the American Stock Exchange report that they will remain closed Wednesday, September 12.

4:36: President Bush departs Offutt Air Force Base on Air Force One.

=== 5:00 p.m. ===
Shortly after 5:00: The photograph Raising the Flag at Ground Zero is taken.

5:20:27: The east penthouse on top of 7 World Trade Center crumbles apart.

5:20:33: 7 World Trade Center, a 47-story building, collapses. The building contained New York's emergency operations center, operated by the NYC Office of Emergency Management, originally intended to respond to disasters such as the September 11 terrorist attacks. Due to the emergency personnel having more than enough time to evacuate the building since the collapse of the North Tower, there are no injuries or deaths as a result of the collapse.

=== 6:00 p.m. ===
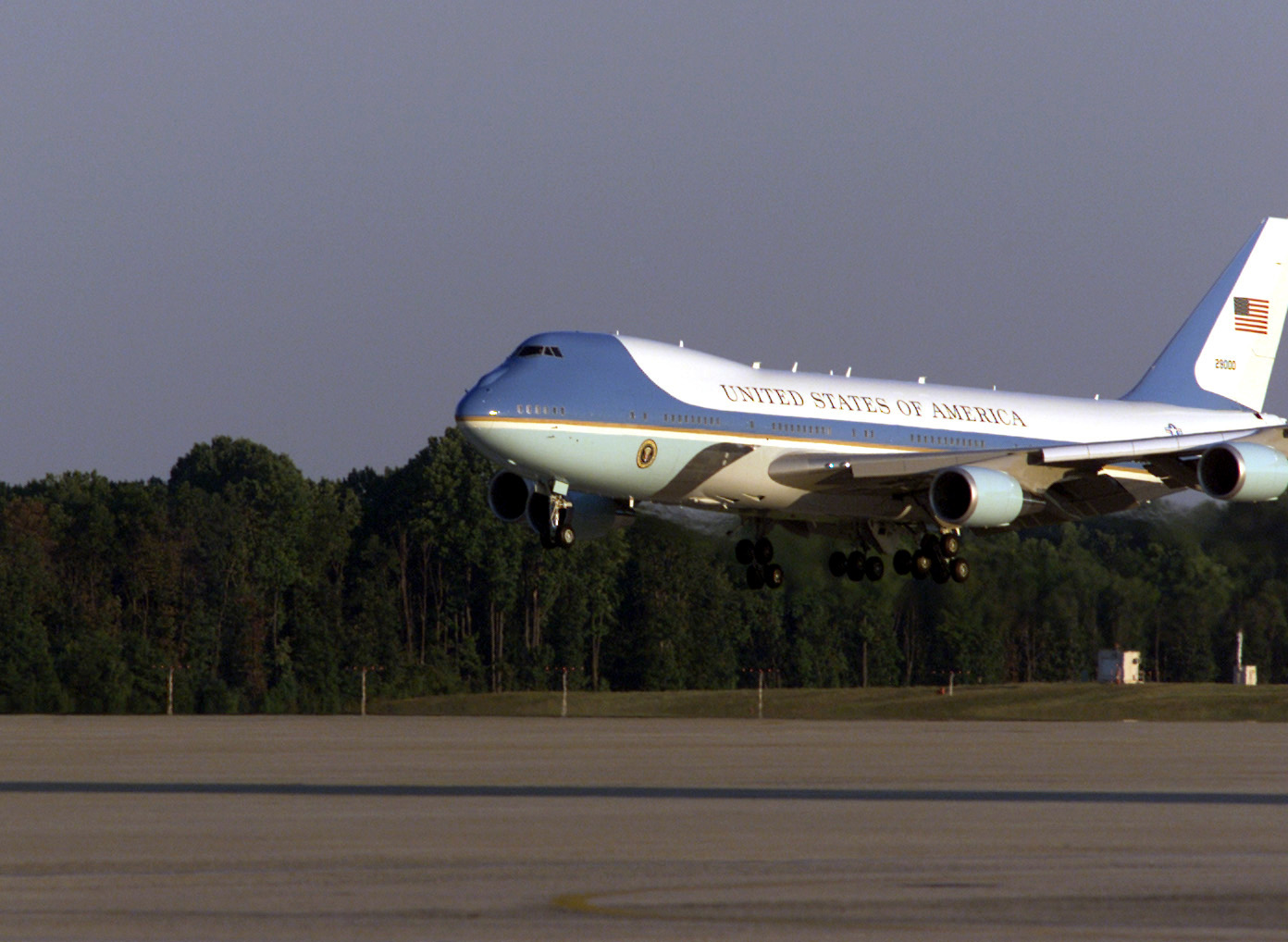
Air Force One landing at Andrews Air Force Base in Maryland.

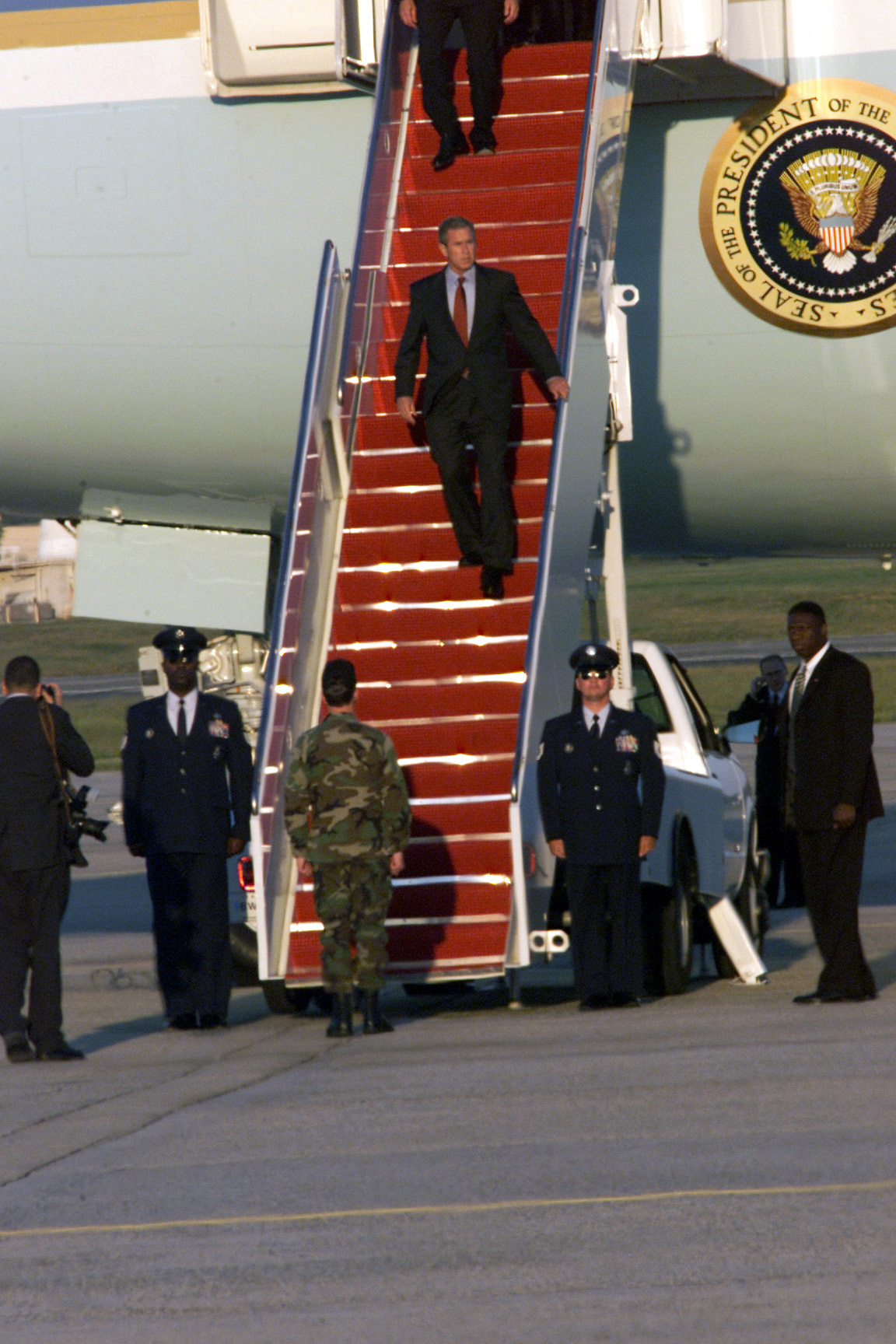
President George W. Bush disembarks from Air Force One after landing in Maryland, to board Marine One for the White House.

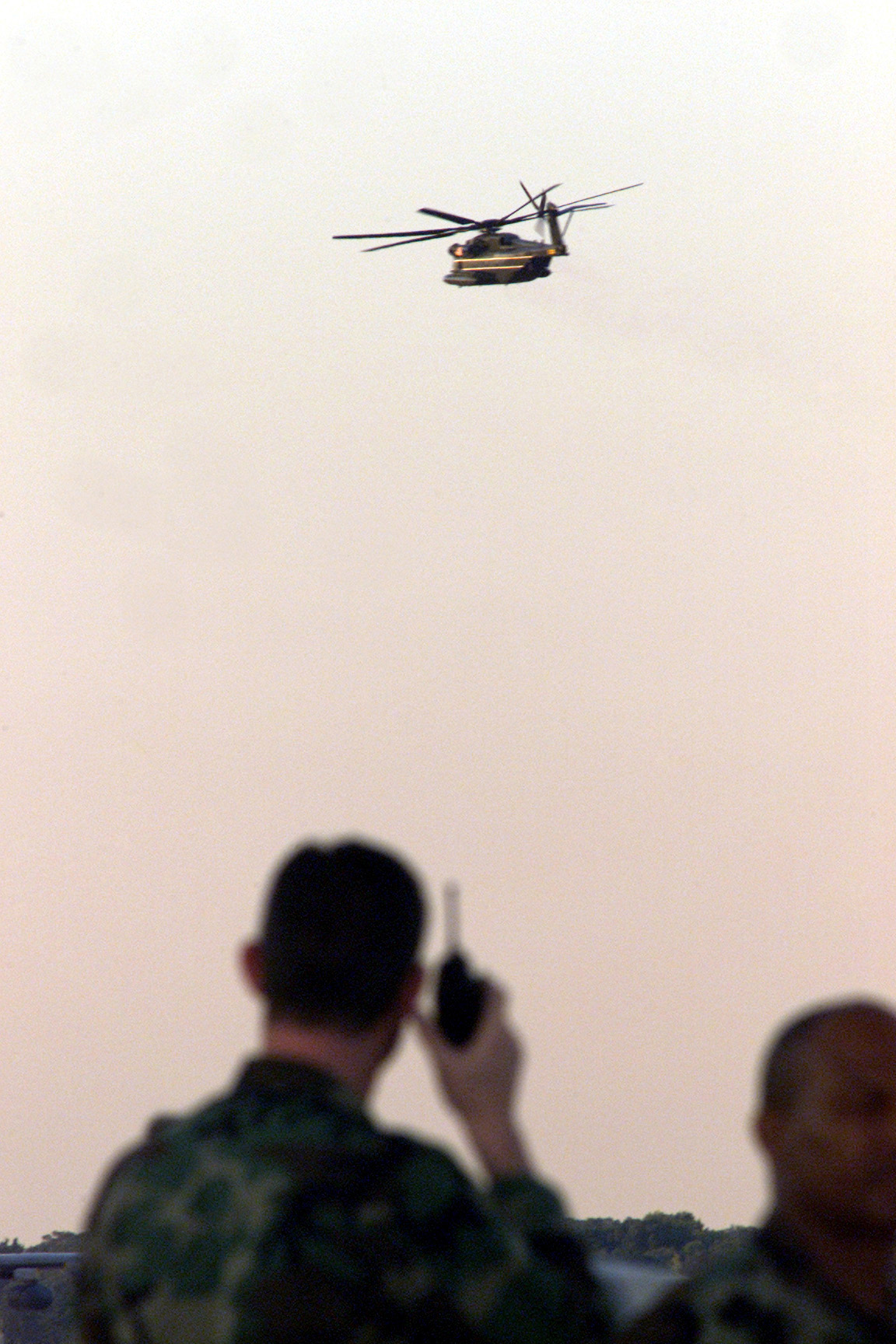
Airmen watch Marine One depart Andrews Air Force Base for the White House with President George Bush aboard.

6:00: Explosions and tracer fire are reported in Kabul, Afghanistan by CNN and the BBC (early hours of September 12 local time). The Northern Alliance, involved in a civil war with the Taliban government, is later reported to have attacked Kabul's airport with helicopter gunships.

6:00: The last of the aircraft headed for the U.S. lands in Canada at Vancouver International Airport, since it was flying over the Pacific.

6:54: U.S. president George W. Bush arrives at the White House in Washington, D.C.

=== 7:00 p.m. ===
7:00: Efforts to locate survivors in the rubble that had been the twin towers continue. Fleets of ambulances are lined up to transport the injured to nearby hospitals, but they stand empty. "Ground Zero", as the site of the WTC collapse becomes known henceforth, is the exclusive domain of New York City's Fire Department and Police Department, despite volunteer steel and construction workers who stand ready to move large quantities of debris quickly. Relatives and friends of victims or likely victims, many displaying enlarged photographs of the missing printed on home computer printers, have appeared around New York. The New York Armory at Lexington Avenue and 26th Street and Union Square Park at 14th Street and Broadway become centers of vigil.

7:24: Members of Congress join on the steps of the United States Capitol and sing "God Bless America".

7:30: The U.S. government denies any responsibility for the reported explosions in Kabul, capital of Afghanistan.

7:30: The Petronas Twin Towers in Kuala Lumpur, capital of Malaysia, are evacuated following reports of a bomb threat (7:30 am on September 12 local time).

=== 8:00 p.m. ===
President George W. Bush addresses the U.S. people on the day's terrorist attacks.

8:00 (approx.): Port Authority police officer Will Jimeno, who was in an underground corridor between the two towers, is found alive in the rubble, and eventually freed at approximately 11:00 p.m.

8:30: U.S. president George W. Bush addresses the country from the White House in Washington, D.C. Among his statements:

Today, our fellow citizens, our way of life, our very freedom came under attack in a series of deliberate and deadly terrorist acts.

Terrorist attacks can shake the foundations of our biggest buildings, but they cannot touch the foundation of America. These acts shatter steel, but they cannot dent the steel of American resolve.

The search is underway for those who are behind these evil acts...we will make no distinction between the terrorists who committed these acts and those who harbor them.

As Bush speaks, members of Congress tell CNN that during private briefings with senior administration officials, they were told that the administration had enough evidence that it was "confident" the attacks are the work of Osama bin Laden and his al-Qaeda terrorist network.

=== 9:00 p.m. ===
9:00: President Bush meets his full National Security Council, followed roughly half an hour later by a meeting with a smaller group of key advisers. Bush and his advisers have evidence that Osama bin Laden is behind the attacks. George Tenet says that al-Qaeda and the Taliban in Afghanistan are essentially one and the same. Bush says, "Tell the Taliban we're finished with them."

=== 10:00 p.m. ===
10:00: There are reports (later proven incorrect) of many survivors buried in rubble in New York making cell phone calls. Only two more survivors will be pulled from the rubble on September 12 and neither of them had made cell phone calls.

=== 11:00 p.m. ===
11:00: After 13 hours, the NYPD, FDNY and PAPD finally dig out Will Jimeno. They learn that Port Authority police sergeant John McLoughlin is also trapped. The NYPD, FDNY and PAPD will eventually dig him out at 8:00 a.m. the next morning after he has been there for almost a day.

11:30: Before retiring to bed, President Bush enters into his journal: "The Pearl Harbor of the 21st century took place today...We think it's Osama bin Laden."

11:50: Footage of Flight 11 impacting the North Tower is aired for the first time. On CNN, Wolf Blitzer interrupts a conversation with NYPD commissioner Raymond Kelly to show Jules Naudet's footage of the impact.

== See also ==
- Timeline for September following the September 11 attacks
- Timeline for October following the September 11 attacks
- Timeline beyond October following the September 11 attacks
