= Mohand al-Shehri =

Saudi terrorist and 9/11 hijacker (1979–2001)

- مهند الشهري
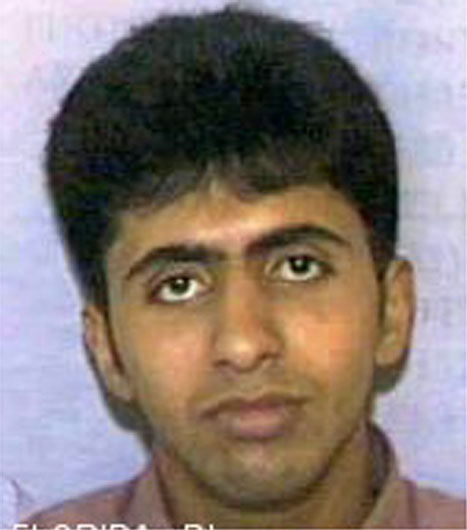
- al-Shehri in July 2001
- Born: Mohand Muhammed Fayiz al-Shehri; May 7, 1979; Aseer, Saudi Arabia
- Died: September 11, 2001 (aged 22); New York City, U.S.
- Cause of death: Suicide by plane crash against the South Tower (September 11 attacks)
- Known for: Muscle hijacker of United Airlines Flight 175 as part of the September 11 attacks
- Height: 5 ft 6 in (1.68 m)

Mohand Muhammed Fayiz al-Shehri (Arabic: مهند محمد فايز الشهري, romanized: Muhand ash-Shehrī, or Alshehri; May 7, 1979 – September 11, 2001) was a Saudi terrorist who was a member of al-Qaeda. He was one of five al-Qaeda members who hijacked United Airlines Flight 175 and crashed it into the South Tower of the World Trade Center in New York City as part of the September 11 attacks.

In early 2000, after dropping out of college in Saudi Arabia, al-Shehri left the country to fight in Chechnya amidst the Second Chechen War. He probably visited al-Qaeda training camps in Afghanistan. After joining al-Qaeda, he was chosen to participate in a series of coordinated terrorist attacks against the United States, which involved 19 men hijacking four American commercial flights to crash them into various targets. In October 2000, al-Shehri obtained a travel visa to be able to enter the U.S., and arrived in the country in May 2001.

On September 11, 2001, al-Shehri and his group of hijackers, led by Marwan al-Shehhi, took control of Flight 175, scheduled to fly from Boston to Los Angeles, and flew it into the South Tower of the World Trade Center complex. The impact caused the tower to collapse, killing hundreds. al-Shehri is not related to Wail al-Shehri or Waleed al-Shehri, hijackers of American Airlines Flight 11, during the attacks.

== History ==
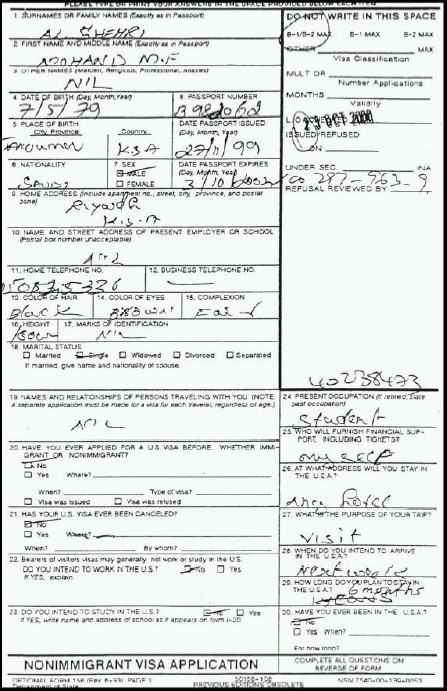
Al-Shehri's visa application

Born in 1979, al-Shehri was one of five hijackers to come from the Asir province of Saudi Arabia, the others being Ahmed al-Nami, Abdulaziz al-Omari, and Waleed and Wail al-Shehri, two brothers with whom he shared the same tribe, Bani Shehr, although they were not related to him.

According to Arab News, Mohand al-Shehri went to fight in Chechnya in early 2000, where he may have met Hamza al-Ghamdi. On October 23, al-Shehri applied for a US B-1/B-2 visa in Jeddah. Other than an error on his school's address the application was not suspicious and he was not interviewed before being granted the visa.

Al-Ghamdi and al-Shehri flew together from Iran into Kuwait that October. Three months later the pair rented a post office box in Delray Beach, Florida, where someone with the same name signed up to use the public library's computers. According to FBI director Robert Mueller and the 9/11 Commission, however, al-Shehri did not first enter the United States until a London or Dubai flight on May 28 with al-Ghamdi and Abdulaziz al-Omari.

He was one of nine hijackers to open a SunTrust bank account with a cash deposit around June 2001, and on July 2 gained a Florida State ID Card.

Al-Shehri occasionally trained on simulators at the FlightSafety Aviation School in Vero Beach, Florida together with Abdulaziz al-Omari and Saeed al-Ghamdi.

== September 11 attacks ==
Fayez Banihammad purchased both his and al-Shehri's one-way first class tickets for United Airlines Flight 175 online on August 27 or 29, charging the $4,464.50 to a Visa card from Mustafa al-Hawsawi, listing their addresses both as a Mail Boxes Etc. in Delray Beach. This was not the same postal box used by Hamza and Ahmed al-Ghamdi, who purchased their tickets for the same flight a day later, with another Mailboxes Etc. postal box in Delray Beach, although both groups listed the same phone number.

On September 7, he flew from Fort Lauderdale to Newark, New Jersey with Hamza al-Ghamdi on $139.75 tickets purchased from the Mile High Travel agency in Lauderdale-by-the-Sea.

On September 10, 2001, he shared a room at the Milner Hotel in Boston, Massachusetts with three other terrorists: Fayez Banihammad, Marwan al-Shehhi, who would pilot Flight 175 into the South Tower of the World Trade Center, and Satam al-Suqami, a hijacker of Flight 11.

On September 11, al-Shehri boarded Flight 175 and sat in first class seat 2B, next to Banihammad in 2A. About a half an hour into the flight, the plane was hijacked. It is believed that Banihammad and al-Shehri forcibly entered the cockpit and murdered the pilots while the al-Ghamdi brothers forced the remaining crew and passengers towards the rear of the aircraft, allowing al-Shehhi to take control of the plane. At 9:03 a.m., around 20 minutes after the hijacking began, al-Shehhi flew the plane into the South Tower of the World Trade Center between floors 77 and 85, killing all on board and killing or trapping hundreds of people inside the building. 56 minutes after the crash, at 9:59 a.m., the South Tower collapsed, killing all who were trapped and many more on the ground.

== See also ==
- Hijackers in the September 11 attacks
- PENTTBOM
