= Mushabib al-Hamlan =

Al-Qaeda member

Mushabib al-Hamlan was a militant who trained in Afghanistan in 2000 and was recruited as a prospective suicide operative for a mission in the United States. After training at the Khaldan and Al-Farouq camps, he met Osama bin Laden and was later instructed by Khalid Sheikh Mohammed in preparations for travel to the United States. Al-Hamlan and Ahmed al-Nami obtained US visas in October 2000, but al-Hamlan decided not to proceed after learning that his mother was ill and returned to his family.

== The Hajj and Pakistan ==
On February 15, 2000, al-Hamlan received a passport and after completing the Hajj, went to Sharjah, UAE, to obtain a visa to enter Pakistan. Once in Islamabad, Pakistan, he and two co-travelers were led by Hassan Ghul to a waypoint controlled by Abu Zubaydah. By March, they had crossed the border into Afghanistan where he attended the Al Khaldan training camp. When the camp was closed, he moved with its other members to Al-Farouq outside Kandahar, where he met Osama bin Laden. After injuring himself at the camp, Hamlan was assigned to guard Kandahar Airport, a task that the eventual hijackers Saeed al-Ghamdi and Waleed al-Shehri shared.

== Potential martyrs ==
During his time at Al-Farooq and the airport, Hamlan is thought to have befriended Ahmed al-Nami. The two of them studied under Abu Basir al-Yemeni, who coaxed them to enlist with Abu Hafs al Mauritani as potential 'martyrs' who would carry out suicide missions inside the United States.

Al-Hamlan and al-Nami were sent to meet bin Laden, identifying themselves through the phrase "I want to be one of this religion's bricks and glorify this religion". In October 2000, al-Hamlan and al-Nami met with Khalid Shaikh Mohammed who instructed them on encrypting telephone calls. They also had their passports falsified to suggest that they were world travelers visiting locations such as Singapore, Malaysia, Egypt and Turkey. After a meeting with Muhammad Atef, they flew to Tehran, Iran, onward to Qatar and back into the UAE before arriving in Mecca, Saudi Arabia. On instructions from Khalid Shaikh Mohammed, they drove to Jeddah, where they stayed with the future hijacker Waleed al-Shehri. He instructed them how to obtain US visas, which both received on October 28.

== Return to family ==
Al-Hamlan did not use his visa. Immediately after they were issued their visas, al-Hamlan phoned his family and learned that his mother was ill. He decided not to pursue martyrdom and returned to his family. Khalid al-Zahrani, an associate from Al-Farouq, visited him later to try to convince him to return, but failed.
