= PENTTBOM =

FBI probe into the 9/11 attacks

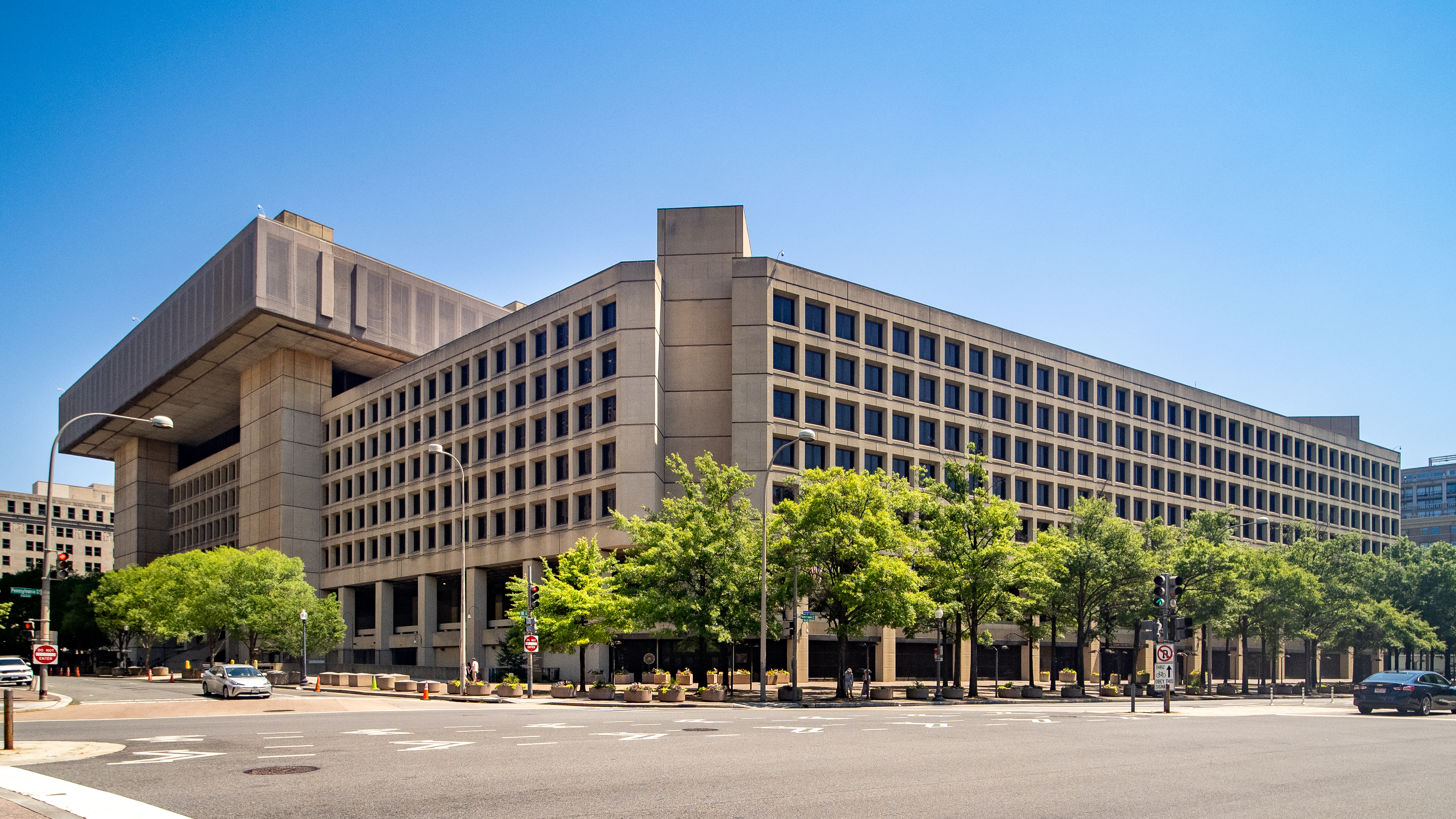
The basement of the J. Edgar Hoover Building, the FBI's headquarters, was used as the base of operations for PENTTBOM

PENTTBOM (sometimes spelled as PENTTBOMB) was the FBI's investigation into the terrorist attacks against the United States on September 11, 2001 (9/11), in which 19 members of al-Qaeda hijacked four U.S. commercial airliners in an attempt to crash them into national landmarks. The name is short for "Pentagon/Twin Towers Bombs", the "bombs" being three planes that had hit the Pentagon in Virginia, and the Twin Towers (1 and 2 World Trade Center) in New York City. The fourth plane crashed in Pennsylvania following passenger intervention.

It was the largest investigation in the FBI's history, in total involving 7,000 employees, including 4,000 special agents. They conducted 180,000 interviews and reviewed millions of pages of documents, and just within the first few months after the attacks, looked into more than 250,000 leads. Thousands of agents were dispatched to other countries for field research.

== Background ==
On September 11, 2001, thousands of civilians in the United States were killed in coordinated terrorist attacks by the Islamic extremist group al-Qaeda. 19 members of the organization hijacked four commercial airliners departing the East Coast in an attempt to crash them into national landmarks. American Airlines Flight 11 and United Airlines Flight 175 were crashed into 1 and 2 World Trade Center (1 and 2 WTC), skyscrapers in the World Trade Center complex in New York City. The crashes caused both buildings to collapse hours later. American Airlines Flight 77 was crashed into the Pentagon in Arlington, Virginia. United Airlines Flight 93, likely intended to be crashed in or near Washington D.C., ultimately crashed in a field in Pennsylvania after the passengers fought back against the hijackers. Everyone onboard the four planes were killed in the crashes.

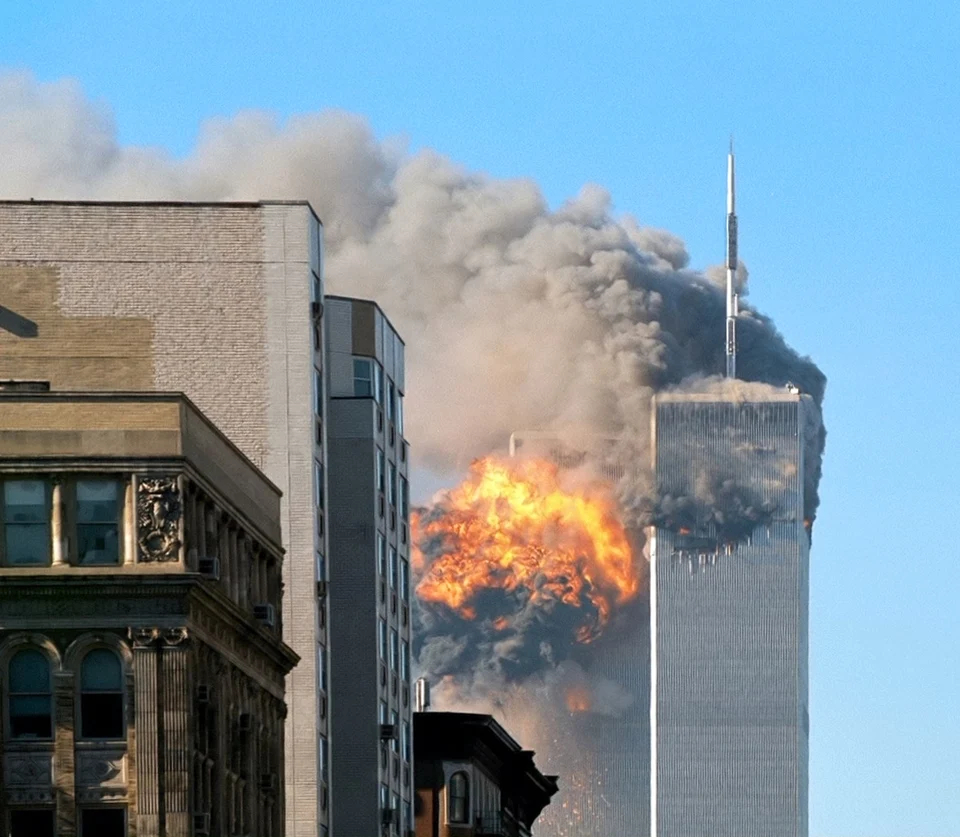
On September 11, 2001, United Airlines Flight 175 crashes into 2 WTC (center), while 1 WTC (right) is damaged from the impact of American Airlines Flight 11.

Al-Qaeda was founded by Osama bin Laden, and the planning of 9/11 was masterminded by Khalid Sheikh Mohammed. The CIA started tracking bin Laden in January 1996, and in August 1996, he declared war against the U.S. on behalf of the Muslim world, demanding the expulsion of all American soldiers stationed in the Arabian Peninsula.

Before the attacks, the various hijackers moved to and lived in the U.S. while making their preparations. Some took flight training courses to prepare for piloting the planes once hijacked, and others were "muscle" hijackers who would assist them. The hijackers on Flight 11 were hijacker-pilot Mohamed Atta, Abdulaziz al-Omari, Satam al-Suqami, Wail al-Shehri, and Waleed al-Shehri. On Flight 175, there was hijacker-pilot Marwan al-Shehhi, Ahmed al-Ghamdi, Fayez Banihammad, Hamza al-Ghamdi, and Mohand al-Shehri. Flight 77 had hijacker-pilot Hani Hanjour, Khalid al-Mihdhar, Majed Moqed, Nawaf al-Hazmi, and Salem al-Hazmi. Flight 93 had hijacker-pilot Ziad Jarrah, Ahmad al-Haznawi, Ahmed al-Nami, and Saeed al-Ghamdi.

Other major conspirators included Mohammed Atef, Ramzi bin al-Shibh, and Walid bin Attash. Additionally, al-Qaeda's plan was worked on by the Hamburg cell, a terrorist cell in Hamburg, before three of its members left for the U.S.—al-Shehhi, Atta, and Jarrah. The other cell members were bin al-Shibh, Abdelghani Mzoudi, Mamoun Darkazanli, Mohammed Haydar Zammar, Mounir el-Motassadeq, Naamen Meziche, Said Bahaji, and Zakariya Essabar.

== Opening the investigation ==
U.S. intelligence determined al-Qaeda to be the perpetrator of the attacks before 9/11 was over. At 9:52 a.m. ET—after Flights 11, 175, and 77 had crashed, but before Flight 93 had—the NSA intercepted a phone call between a known associate of bin Laden in Afghanistan, and someone in the Republic of Georgia, the former announcing that he had heard "good news", and that another target was still to be hit. Around 3:30 p.m., U.S. president George W. Bush convened a meeting of U.S. intelligence officials. Director of Central Intelligence George Tenet stated that he was very certain that bin Laden and his associates were the perpetrators, mentioning that U.S. intelligence had checked the manifest of Flight 77, and found three names of known al-Qaeda members.

The FBI began their investigation immediately upon the attacks. Its name, PENTTBOM, is short for "Pentagon/Twin Towers Bombs"—the "bombs" being planes filled with jet fuel, in accordance with FBI naming tradition; for instance, their investigation of the 1995 Oklahoma City bombing was "OKBOM". First involving 70 people, the investigators' base of operations was in the basement of the J. Edgar Hoover Building, the agency's headquarters.

== Identifying the hijackers ==
The FBI was able to identify the 19 hijackers within a matter of days as few suspects made any effort to conceal their names on flight, credit card, and other records.

=== Identical letters ===
Three of the hijackers carried copies of an identical handwritten letter (in Arabic) that was found in three separate locations: the first, in a suitcase of Mohamed Atta that did not make the connection to American Airlines Flight 11 that crashed into 1 World Trade Center; the second, in a vehicle parked at Washington Dulles International Airport that belonged to hijacker Nawaf al-Hazmi; and the third at the crash site of United Airlines Flight 93 in Pennsylvania.

According to the testimony before the House Intelligence Subcommittee on Terrorism and Homeland Defense on October 3, 2001, given by J. T. Caruso, the Deputy Assistant Director of the FBI's Counterterrorism Division, "translations of the letter indicate an alarming willingness to die on the part of the hijackers."

=== Passports recovered ===
According to testimony by Susan Ginsberg, a staff member of the National Commission on Terrorist Attacks Upon the U.S., in the January 26, 2004, Public Hearing:

Four of the hijackers' passports have survived in whole or in part. Two were recovered from the crash site of United Airlines flight 93 in Pennsylvania. These are the passports of Ziad Jarrah and Saeed al Ghamdi. One belonged to a hijacker on American Airlines flight 11. This is the passport of Satam al Suqami. A passerby picked it up and gave it to a NYPD detective shortly before the World Trade Center towers collapsed. A fourth passport was recovered from luggage that did not make it from a Portland flight to Boston on to the connecting flight which was American Airlines Flight 11. This is the passport of Abdulaziz al-Omari.

In addition to these four, some digital copies of the hijackers passports were recovered in post-9/11 operations. Two of the passports that have survived, those of Satam al-Suqami and Abdulaziz al-Omari, were clearly doctored. These passports were manipulated in a fraudulent manner in ways that have been associated with al Qaeda.

The passport of Satam al-Suqami was recovered a few blocks from the World Trade Center.

According to the 9/11 Commission, the passports of two of the Flight 93 hijackers were also found in the aircraft's debris field, those were the passports of Ziad Jarrah and Saeed al Ghamdi. The passport of Ziad Jarrah was mostly charred.

The doctored passport of Abdulaziz al-Omari was found in Mohamed Atta's left-behind luggage.

When examining Atta's luggage, the FBI found important clues about the hijackers and their plans. His luggage contained papers that revealed the identity of all 19 hijackers, and provided information about their plans, motives, and backgrounds. The FBI was able to determine details such as dates of birth, known and/or possible residences, visa statuses, and specific identities of the suspected pilots.

== Linking the hijackers to al-Qaeda ==
The investigators were quickly able to link the 19 men to al-Qaeda, by accessing their intelligence agency files. The New York Times reported on September 12 that: "Authorities said they had also identified accomplices in several cities who had helped plan and execute Tuesday's attacks. Officials said they knew who these people were and important biographical details about many of them. They prepared biographies of each identified member of the hijack teams, and began tracing the recent movements of the men." FBI agents in Florida investigating the hijackers quickly "descended on flight schools, neighborhoods and restaurants in pursuit of leads." At one flight school, "students said investigators were there within hours of Tuesday's attacks." The Washington Post later reported that "In the hours after Tuesday's bombings, investigators searched their files on [Satam] Al Suqami and [Ahmed] Alghamdi, noted the pair's ties to [Nabil] al-Marabh and launched a hunt for him."

On September 27, 2001, the FBI released photos of the 19 hijackers, along with information about the possible nationalities and aliases of many.

== Press releases ==
- September 11, 2001: FBI opens investigations
- September 14: FBI releases list of 9/11 hijacker suspects
- September 27: FBI releases photographs of 9/11 hijacker suspects
- September 28: FBI releases four-page letter believed to be written by the hijackers
- October 4: FBI releases partial timeline for Boston-based hijackers

== See also ==
- Responsibility for the September 11 attacks
