= Ahmed al-Haznawi =

Saudi terrorist and 9/11 hijacker (1980–2001)

- أحمد الحزنوي
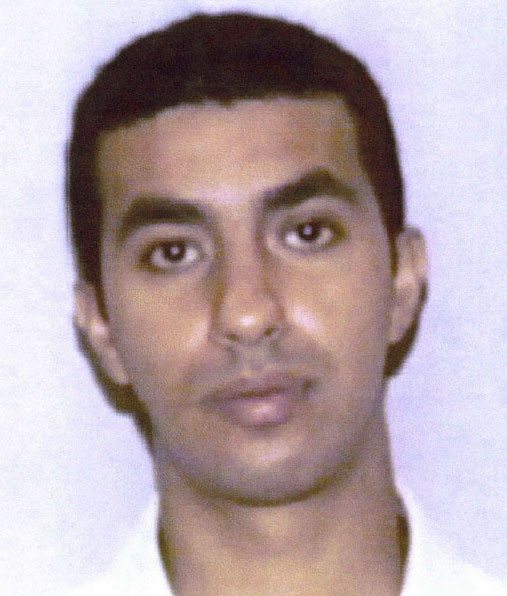
- Al-Haznawi in July 2001
- Born: Ahmed Ibrahim al-Haznawi al-Ghamdi; October 11, 1980; Al-Bahah, Saudi Arabia
- Died: September 11, 2001 (aged 20); Stonycreek Township, Somerset County, Pennsylvania, U.S.
- Cause of death: Suicide by plane crash or overpowered by passengers during the September 11 attacks
- Known for: Muscle hijacker of United Airlines Flight 93 as part of the September 11 attacks

Ahmed Ibrahim al-Haznawi al-Ghamdi (Note: Full name: Aḥmad Ibrāhīm al-Ḥaznāwī al-Ghāmdī, Arabic: أَحْمَدُ إِبْرَاهِيمَ ٱلْحَزْنَوِيِّ ٱلْغَاْمِدِيِّ) (October 11, 1980 – September 11, 2001) was a Saudi terrorist hijacker. He was one of the four hijackers of United Airlines Flight 93, which was crashed into a field in Stonycreek Township, Pennsylvania, following a passenger revolt, as part of the September 11 attacks.

He left his family to fight in Chechnya in 2000. He was chosen to participate in the 9/11 attacks. He arrived in the United States in June 2001 under the direction of Al-Qaeda for terrorist attacks, on a tourist visa. Once he was in the U.S., he settled in Florida and helped plan out how the attacks would take place.

On 11 September 2001, al-Haznawi boarded United Airlines Flight 93 and assisted in the hijacking of the plane so it could be crashed into an iconic building, likely the U.S. Capitol or the White House. al-Haznawi or Ahmed al-Nami are believed to be one of the apparent hijackers to have carried the bomb. Instead, the plane crashed into a field in Somerset County, Pennsylvania, after the passengers on-board started a revolt against al-Haznawi and the other hijackers.

== Early life ==
Ahmed al-Haznawi was the son of a Saudi imam from the Al-Bahah Province, a province in the south west of Saudi Arabia. Al-Haznawi grew up in the village of Hazna, where his father was a cleric at the mosque in the central marketplace section of the village. Al-Haznawi belonged to a family that was part of the larger Ghamd tribe, sharing the same tribal affiliation with fellow hijackers Saeed al-Ghamdi, Hamza al-Ghamdi, and Ahmed al-Ghamdi. He memorised the Quran, giving him the title hafiz.

This group is noted as being some of the more religiously observant of the hijackers, and they are thought to have met one another some time in 1999.

== Early activities ==
=== 1999–2000 ===
Al-Haznawi announced he was leaving his family in 1999 to fight in Chechnya, although his father forbade him from travelling to Chechnya. His father and brother, Abdul Rahman al-Haznawi, reportedly last heard from him in late 2000, after he made references to training in Afghanistan.

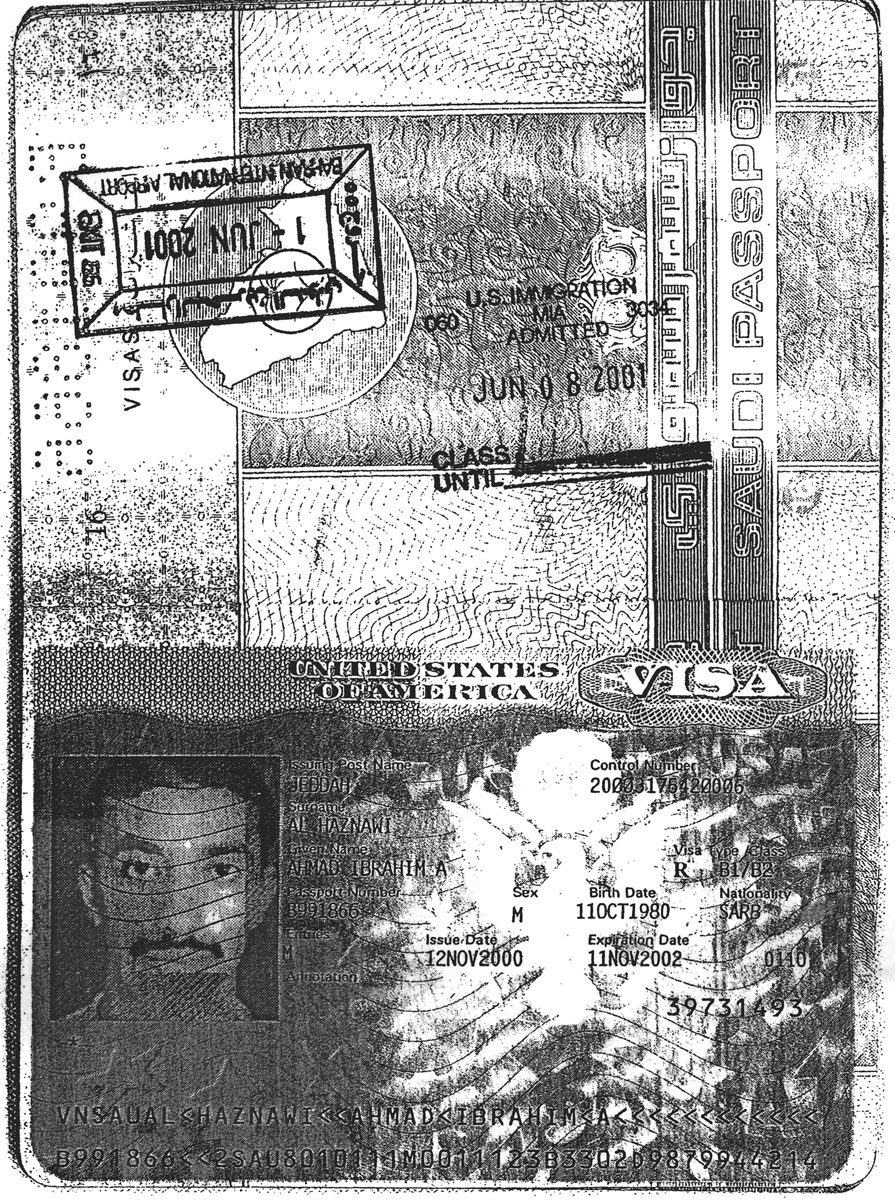
al-Haznawi's U.S. visa

On 12 November 2000, al-Haznawi applied for and received a two-year U.S. B-1/B-2 (tourist/business) visa in Jeddah, Saudi Arabia.

From 27 November 2000, through 27 December that year, al-Haznawi was in Saudi Arabia for Ramadan. It is theorized that during this trip, he may have initially told Saeed and Hamza al-Ghamdi about the operation.

Some time late in 2000, al-Haznawi traveled to the United Arab Emirates, where he purchased traveler's cheques presumed to have been paid for by Mustafa al-Hawsawi. Five other hijackers also passed through the UAE and purchased travellers cheques, including Majed Moqed, Saeed al-Ghamdi, Hamza al-Ghamdi, Wail al-Shehri, and Ahmed al-Nami.

=== 2001 ===
He was one of four hijackers believed to be staying at a Kandahar guest house in March 2001, where they were seen by Mohammed Jabarah. Jabarah remembered al-Haznawi specifically, saying that he was "very devout and could recite the entire Koran from memory."

On 8 June, he arrived in Miami, Florida, with fellow hijacker Wail al-Shehri. He was one of nine hijackers to open a SunTrust bank account with a cash deposit around June 2001. He is believed to have moved in with Ziad Jarrah, who got a new apartment on Bougainvilla Dr. in Lauderdale-by-the-Sea, after both men gave the landlord photocopies of their German passports, which he later turned over to the FBI.

On 25 June, Jarrah took al-Haznawi to Holy Cross Hospital in Fort Lauderdale on advice of his landlord. Al-Haznawi was treated by Dr. Christos Tsonas, who gave him antibiotics for a cut on his left calf. While he told staff that he had bumped into a suitcase, the media briefly reported it as a sign of cutaneous anthrax and a possible link to the 2001 anthrax attacks, although FBI later addressed the rumors stating that "[e]xhaustive testing did not support that anthrax was present anywhere the hijackers had been."

On 10 July, al-Haznawi obtained a Florida driver's license, later obtaining another copy on 7 September 2001, by filling out a change-of-address form. Five other hijackers also received duplicate Florida licenses in 2001, and others had licenses from different states. Some have speculated that this was to allow multiple persons to use the same identity.

Jarrah and al-Haznawi both received their one-way tickets for United Airlines Flight 93, on 5 September. On 7 September all four Flight 93 hijackers flew from Fort Lauderdale to Newark International Airport aboard Spirit Airlines.

== Attacks ==
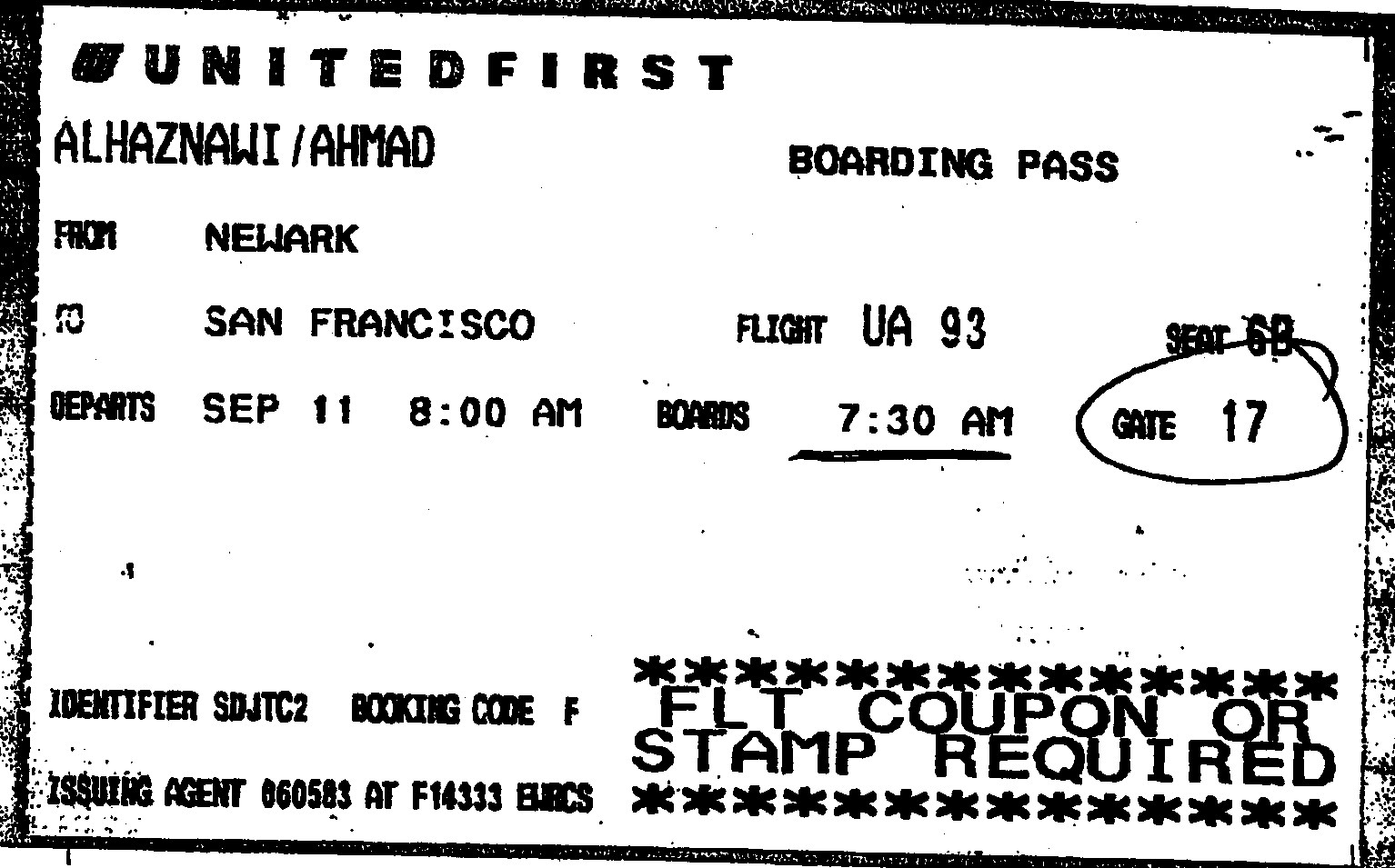
Ahmed al-Haznawi's boarding pass for Flight 93

On 11 September 2001, al-Haznawi arrived at Newark International Airport to board United Airlines Flight 93. Although he was selected for additional security by CAPPS and screened, he was able to board the flight without incident, with only his checked bags requiring extra screening for explosives.

Due to the flight's delay, the pilot and crew were notified of the previous hijackings that day and were told to be on the alert. Within minutes, Flight 93 was hijacked as well.

At least two of the cellphone calls made by passengers indicate that the hijackers were wearing red bandanas. The calls also indicated that one had tied a box around his torso, and claimed there was a bomb inside. Some passengers expressed doubt that the bomb was real.

Passengers on the plane heard through phone calls the fates of the other hijacked planes. A passenger uprising soon took place. Three times in a period of five seconds there were shouts of pain or distress from a hijacker outside the cockpit, suggesting that a hijacker was being attacked by the passengers. Hijacker-pilot Ziad Jarrah crashed the plane into an empty field near Shanksville, Pennsylvania, in order to prevent the passengers from gaining control of the plane. The crash killed everyone on board.

== Aftermath ==
After the attacks, before the release of the FBI pictures of the hijackers, Arab News reported that al-Haznawi's brother Abdul Rahman had told al-Madinah newspaper that a photograph published by local newspapers bore no resemblance to his brother.

A videotape titled "The Wills of the New York and Washington Battle Martyrs" was aired on Al Jazeera on April 16, 2002. While the name beneath the speaker read al-Ghamdi, the image is of al-Haznawi speaking. Officials suggested that the name was merely a reference to his tribal affiliation. The film was thought to have been made in March 2001. In it, he talked about his plans to bring the "bloodied message" to America. In September 2002, a similar tape made by Abdulaziz al-Omari appeared.

== In popular culture ==
- He has been portrayed by Hugh Mun in the 2005 television film The Flight That Fought Back, Moroccan actor Omar Berdouni in United 93, and Canadian actor Zak Santiago in Flight 93.

== See also ==
- PENTTBOM
- Hijackers in the September 11 attacks
