= Hamza al-Ghamdi =

Saudi terrorist and 9/11 hijacker (1980–2001)

- حمزة الغامدي
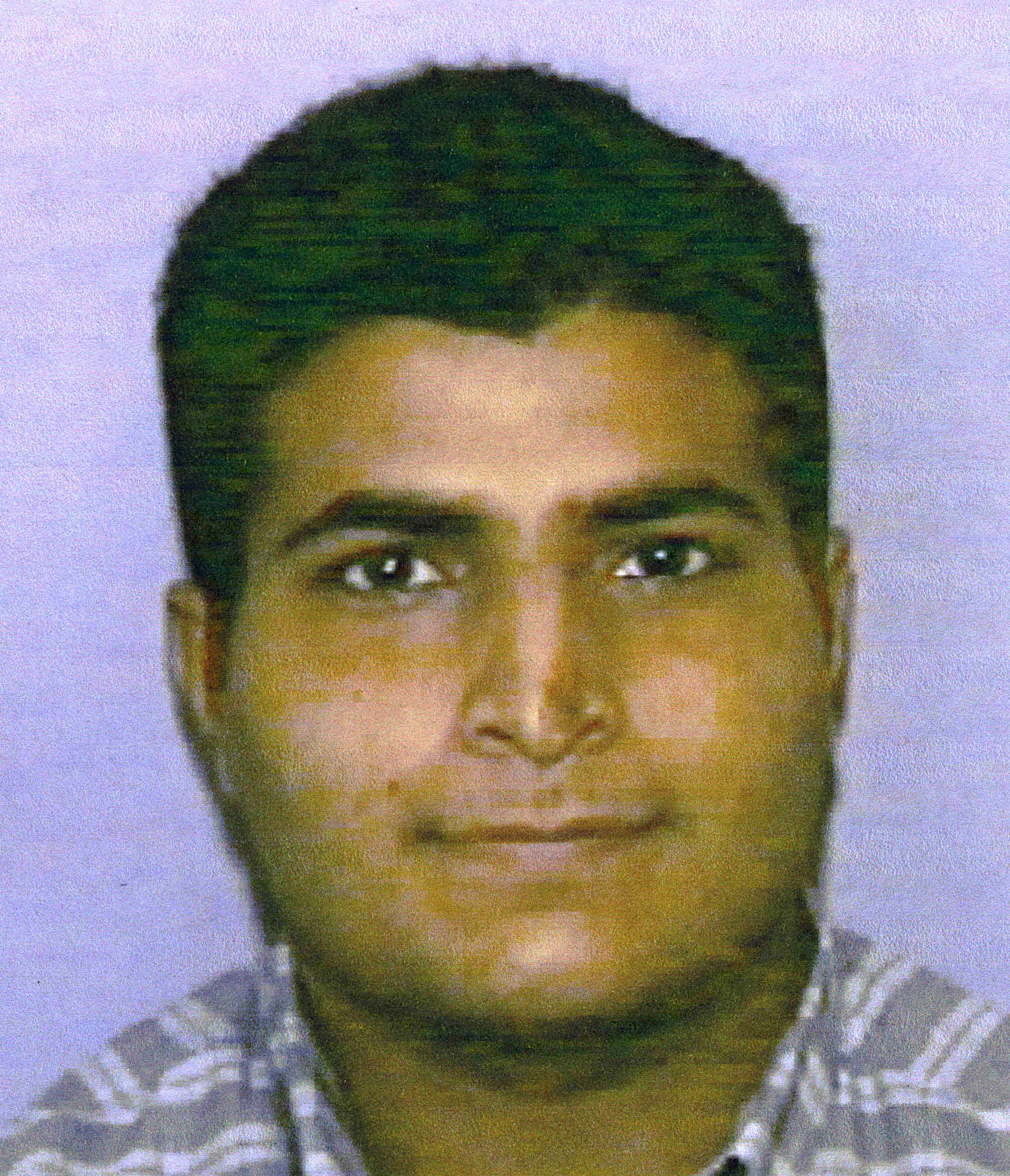
- Al-Ghamdi in June 2001
- Born: Hamza Salah Sa'id al-Ghamdi; November 18, 1980; Al-Bahah, Saudi Arabia
- Died: September 11, 2001 (aged 20); New York City, U.S.
- Cause of death: Suicide by plane crash against the South Tower during the September 11 attacks
- Known for: Muscle hijacker of United Airlines Flight 175 as part of the September 11 attacks
- Height: 5 ft 7 in (1.70 m)
- Relatives: Ahmed al-Ghamdi (brother)

Hamza Salah Sa'id al-Ghamdi (Arabic: حمزة صلاح سعيد الغامدي, romanized: Ḥamza al-Ghāmdī; November 18, 1980 – September 11, 2001) was a Saudi terrorist hijacker. He was one of five hijackers of United Airlines Flight 175 as part of the September 11 attacks.

Born in Saudi Arabia, Hamza al-Ghamdi left his family to fight in Chechnya and is thought to have been present in Al-Qaeda training camps in Afghanistan where he was chosen to participate in the 9/11 attacks.

He arrived in the United States in May 2001 on a tourist visa. On September 11, 2001, al-Ghamdi boarded United Airlines Flight 175 and assisted in the hijacking of the plane, along with his older brother Ahmed al-Ghamdi and 3 other terrorists, so that lead hijacker and trained pilot Marwan al-Shehhi could crash the plane into the South Tower of the World Trade Center.

== History ==
Some reports say that al-Ghamdi left his home to fight in Chechnya against the Russians in early 2000 (other reports say he left in January 2001). He called home several times until late 2001, saying he was in Chechnya.

Known as Julaybeeb during the preparations, al-Ghamdi traveled to the United Arab Emirates some time in late 2000, where he purchased traveler's cheques presumed to have been paid for by Mustafa al-Hawsawi. Five other hijackers also passed through the UAE and purchased traveller's cheques, including Majed Moqed, Saeed al-Ghamdi, Wail al-Shehri, Ahmed al-Haznawi, and Ahmed al-Nami.

In January 2001, al-Ghamdi rented a post office box in Delray Beach, Florida, with another hijacker, Mohand al-Shehri. According to FBI director Robert Mueller and the 9/11 Commission however, al-Ghamdi did not first enter the United States until a London flight on 28 May with Mohand al-Shehri and Abdulaziz al-Omari.

In March 2001, al-Ghamdi was filmed in a farewell video that was aired on Al Jazeera. In the video, many future 9/11 hijackers swear to become martyrs, although no details of the plot are revealed. Al-Ghamdi does not speak in the film, but is seen studying maps and flight manuals.

He was one of nine hijackers to open a SunTrust bank account with a cash deposit around June 2001. Al-Ghamdi also applied for and received a Florida driver's license on 27 June 2001. In the next two months, he obtained two duplicate licenses simply by filling out change-of-address forms. Five other suspected hijackers also received duplicate Florida licenses in 2001, and others had licenses in different states. Some have speculated that this was to allow multiple people to use the same identity.

== Attacks ==
Al-Ghamdi purchased his own eTicket for United Airlines Flight 175 on 29 August, using his Visa card. The FBI claimed that he also purchased an eTicket for a "Flight 7950" from Los Angeles to San Francisco, although it does not give the projected date of flight.

On 30 August, Hamza al-Ghamdi bought his brother, Ahmed al-Ghamdi, an identical eTicket for Flight 175 and bought them each one-way tickets on an AirTran flight on 7 September, from Fort Lauderdale, Florida to Boston, Massachusetts. However, al-Ghamdi instead went with Mohand al-Shehri to Newark, New Jersey, on $139.75 tickets purchased from the Mile High Travel agency in Lauderdale-by-the-Sea.

Hamza and Ahmed al-Ghamdi stayed at the Charles Hotel in Cambridge, Massachusetts. On September 8 they checked out of the hotel, and moved into the Days Inn on Soldiers Field Road in the Boston neighborhood of Brighton, where they remained up until the attacks.

On the morning of 11 September 2001, Hamza al-Ghamdi left the hotel with his brother. The two men shared a taxicab ride to Logan International Airport, where they boarded Flight 175. At some time between 08:42 and 08:46, al-Ghamdi and the other hijackers hijacked the flight and Marwan al-Shehhi took control of the plane. At 09:03, al-Shehhi crashed the plane into the South Tower of the World Trade Center, killing al-Ghamdi and the rest of the people on Flight 175.

== Aftermath ==
On 22 September 2001, Arab News reported that Hamza al-Ghamdi's father told the Al Watan newspaper that an "FBI-released" photograph bore absolutely no resemblance to his son. However, the picture al-Ghamdi's father refers to is assumed to have not been a picture released by the FBI, as they did not make the hijacker's pictures available until 27 September 2001.

He appeared in a video released on 8 September 2006, that showed the planning of the attacks.

== See also ==
- Hijackers in the 11 September attacks
- PENTTBOM
