= Wail al-Shehri =

Saudi terrorist and 9/11 hijacker (1973–2001)

- وائل الشهري
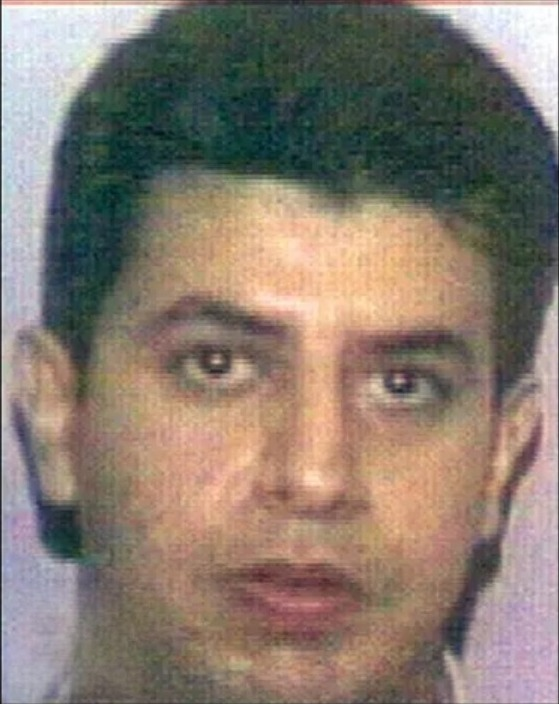
- Al-Shehri in July 2001
- Born: Wail Mohammed al-Shehri; July 31, 1973; Asir, Saudi Arabia
- Died: September 11, 2001 (aged 28); New York City, U.S.
- Cause of death: Suicide by plane crash against the North Tower (September 11 attacks)
- Known for: Muscle hijacker of American Airlines Flight 11 as part of the September 11 attacks
- Height: 5 ft 10 in (1.78 m)
- Relatives: Waleed al-Shehri (brother)

Wail Mohammed al-Shehri (Arabic: وائل الشهري, romanized: Wāīl ash-Shehrī; or Alshehri; July 31, 1973 – September 11, 2001) was a Saudi school teacher and terrorist hijacker for al-Qaeda. He was one of five hijackers of American Airlines Flight 11, which was flown into the North Tower of the World Trade Center as part of the September 11 attacks.

Wail al-Shehri was an elementary school teacher from Khamis Mushait in the Asir region of Saudi Arabia. In early 2000, he traveled to Medina to seek treatment for mental problems. He and his younger brother Waleed traveled to Afghanistan in March 2000 and joined an Al-Qaeda training camp. The brothers were chosen, along with others from the same region of Saudi Arabia, to participate in the September 11 attacks. Once selected, al-Shehri returned to Saudi Arabia in October 2000 to obtain a clean passport, then returned to Afghanistan. In March 2001, he recorded his last will and testament on video.

Al-Shehri arrived in the United States in early June 2001, staying in budget motels in the Boynton Beach area of south Florida. On September 5, 2001, al-Shehri traveled to Boston and checked into a motel with his brother. Six days later, al-Shehri arrived early in the morning at Boston's Logan International Airport and boarded American Airlines Flight 11. Fifteen minutes after takeoff, al-Shehri, along with his brother and three other terrorists, hijacked the airliner. They deliberately crashed it into the North Tower of the World Trade Center at 8:46 a.m.

In the aftermath of the attacks, some news reports mistakenly asserted that al-Shehri was the son of a Saudi diplomat and was still alive, which the al-Shehri family in Khamis Mushait denied, saying that the al-Shehri brothers had disappeared and have not been heard from since.

== Background ==
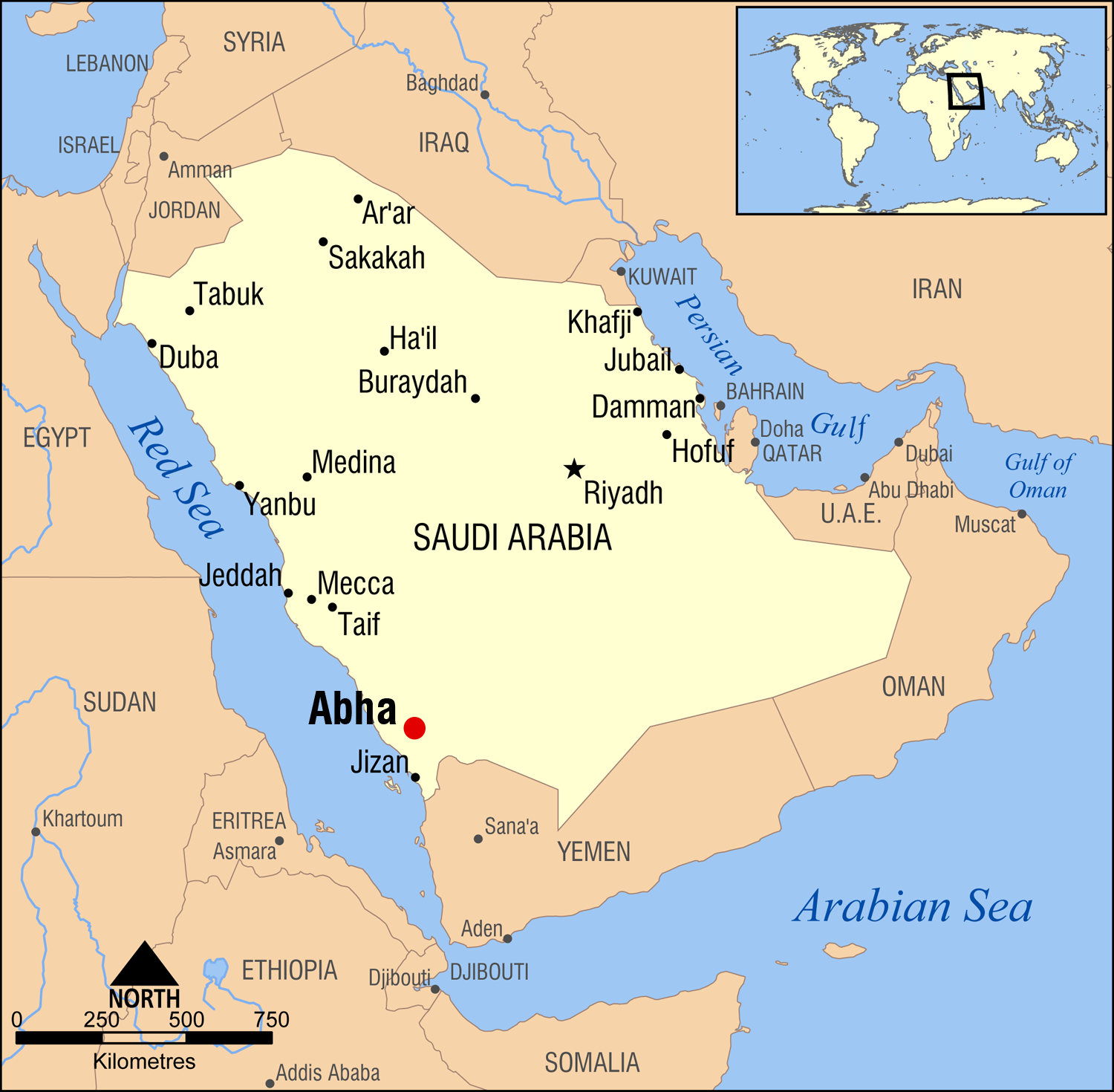
Abha is the capital of Saudi Arabia's Asir province, where Wail al-Shehri was from, and Wail graduated from Abha's teacher college.

Wail al-Shehri and his younger brother Waleed were from Khamis Mushait in the Asir province, which is an impoverished area in southwestern Saudi Arabia, along the Yemeni border. Al-Shehri was born in Annams, and grew up in the Um Saraar neighborhood in Khamis Mushait. He had ten brothers and one sister. Several of al-Shehri's brothers joined the Saudi military, while his uncle may have been a major in the army and director of logistics. Al-Shehri's father, Mohammed Ali Asgley Al Shehri, worked as a car dealer. On weekends, the family often spent time together at the Red Sea. The family strictly adhered to the Wahabi school of Islam, which forbids many elements of modernity. As such, the al-Shehri family did not have satellite television or Internet, nor did his parents permit music or contact with girls. Some of Wail al-Shehri's elder brothers had visited the United States and could speak English, but Wail himself knew little English.

During high school and college, al-Shehri was deeply religious and attended Al-Seqley Mosque, which his family had built as the local mosque. Al-Shehri also frequented government-supported religious camps in Saudi Arabia. At this time, there were strong religious feelings in Saudi Arabia, especially in the Asir region. Many young people in the region idolized Osama bin Laden, who had family ties to the area. Al-Shehri's father was a friend of Bin Laden's father, Mohammed bin Awad bin Laden. Ahmed al-Nami and Saeed al-Ghamdi, who were both hijackers on United Airlines Flight 93, came from the same area in Saudi Arabia as the Shehri family.

After graduating from Abha teachers college in 1999, Wail al-Shehri took a job as an elementary school physical education teacher at the Khamis Mushait airbase. Five months into the job, al-Shehri took leave due to mental illness and depression. Rather than conventional therapy, al-Shehri sought consultation with Muslim clerics, and hoped that a visit to Medina would help. His treatment involved verses from the Qur'an read to him by a sheikh. He traveled to Medina together with Waleed. After the September 11 attacks, others recalled seeing the al-Shehri brothers in Medina.

== Afghanistan ==
Wail and Waleed al-Shehri disappeared after going to Medina, calling their father just once; in the conversation, the brothers were vague about when they would return. Both had expressed interest in joining the jihad in Chechnya, though may have been diverted to Afghanistan. Before disappearing, the al-Shehri brothers went to Al-Seqley Mosque to swear an oath and commitment to jihad, as did Ahmed al-Nami and Saeed al-Ghamdi. Wail al-Shehri presided over the ceremony, dubbing himself Abu Mossaeb al-Janubi after one of Muhammad's companions.

In March 2000, he left for Pakistan with Waleed and Ahmed al-Nami; later, they went on to Afghanistan. Wail al-Shehri followed the standard path for new al-Qaeda recruits in Afghanistan, spending time in the Khalden training camp and then Al Farouq training camp near Kandahar. Details on how the non-pilot ("muscle") hijackers were chosen for the 9/11 attacks are vague, though the hijackers appear to have been selected by senior al-Qaeda leaders in 2000 from the thousands of recruits at training camps in Afghanistan. The most capable and motivated volunteers were at al-Farouq, and Saudi citizens were good candidates, since it would be easy for them to obtain visas to travel to the United States. Central Intelligence Agency (CIA) director George Tenet later said that the muscle hijackers were probably told little about their mission in the United States.

Once al-Shehri and the other muscle hijackers completed their training in Afghanistan, they received $2,000 so they could return to Saudi Arabia to obtain new passports and visas. The al-Shehri brothers may have been assisted by a relative who worked in the Saudi passport office. Wail and Waleed al-Shehri received passports on 3 October 2000, and then obtained United States visas on 24 October. On his visa application, Wail al-Shehri provided vague information, stating his employer/school as "South City", and his destination as "Wasantwn". Al-Shehri indicated his occupation as "teacher", and that he would be traveling with his brother on a four-to-six month vacation, which would be paid for with al-Shehri's teacher salary. Although he would not be working while on vacation, consular officials nonetheless did not question if the al-Shehri brothers had the financial means to support themselves while in the United States.

In late 2000, al-Shehri traveled to the United Arab Emirates, where he purchased traveler's checks, presumed to have been paid for by Mustafa Ahmed al-Hawsawi. Five other hijackers passed through the United Arab Emirates and purchased traveler's checks, including Majed Moqed, Saeed al-Ghamdi, Hamza al-Ghamdi, Ahmed al-Haznawi, and Ahmed al-Nami. The 9/11 Commission believes that in mid-November 2000, three of the future muscle hijackers, including the al-Shehri brothers, traveled in a group from Saudi Arabia to Beirut and then onward to Iran where they could travel through to Afghanistan without getting their passports stamped. An associate of a senior Hezbollah operative is thought to have been on the same flight, although this may have been a coincidence.

Wail al-Shehri appeared in two al-Qaeda videos recorded in Afghanistan. In the first, recorded in March 2001 and released through Al Jazeera in September 2002, he appears together with hijackers Ahmed al-Nami, Hamza al-Ghamdi, and Ahmed al-Ghamdi; Abdulaziz al-Omari's last will and testament was also included, but al-Shehri himself does not speak and can be seen studying maps and flight manuals. The second video depicts him recording his own last will and testament; this video was released on September 7, 2006.

== United States ==
On June 5, 2001, Wail al-Shehri obtained an International Driving Permit, which was issued in Sharjah in the United Arab Emirates. Al-Shehri arrived together with fellow al-Qaeda member Ahmed al-Haznawi at Miami International Airport, via London, from Dubai on June 8. Both were admitted as tourists for six months. Al-Shehri opened a bank account at SunTrust Bank in Florida on June 18, with a deposit of $8,000 that came from American Express traveler's cheques purchased on June 7 in the United Arab Emirates.

Al-Shehri moved into the Homing Inn, a budget motel in Boynton Beach, on June 21, 2001, sharing a room with his brother Waleed and Satam al-Suqami. Wail al-Shehri and al-Suqami both used this hotel as their address when they received Florida state non-driver identifications on July 3. Al-Shehri checked into the Panther Motel & Apartments, in Deerfield Beach, with his brother and al-Suqami on August 2, staying there until August 10. While in Florida, al-Shehri was a member of the World Gym in Boynton Beach, where he trained with Waleed and al-Suqami. During the summer of 2001, al-Shehri regularly used computers at the Delray Beach Public Library.

On August 28, 2001, Wail and Waleed al-Shehri made reservations on American Airlines Flight 11, using the Mail Boxes Etc. in Hollywood, Florida, as their address. The al-Shehri brothers contacted American Airlines on September 3 by telephone to change their first-class seat assignments for American Airlines Flight 11, selecting seats on the side of the aircraft that offered a direct view of the cockpit. Wail and Waleed al-Shehri left Florida for Boston on September 5, traveling together on Delta Air Lines Flight 2462.

Wail al-Shehri checked in together with Waleed at the Park Inn Hotel in Chestnut Hill, Massachusetts, on September 5, 2001, staying in room 432. While staying at the Park Inn, the brothers may have called a prostitute. Wail al-Shehri accompanied his brother on September 9 to the Travelex at Logan International Airport, where Waleed attempted to wire $5,000 to the United Arab Emirates. Waleed had insufficient documentation, so the brothers returned the next day to complete the transaction. Mustafa al-Hawsawi received the funds on September 11 at Al-Ansari Exchange in Sharjah. Hijacker Abdulaziz al-Omari possibly spent a night at the Park Inn before leaving with Mohamed Atta for Portland, Maine, on September 10. When Wail and Waleed al-Shehri checked out on September 11, they left a sheet of instructions for flying a jet behind in their hotel room.

== Attacks ==
Wail al-Shehri, his brother Waleed, and Satam al-Suqami arrived together at Logan Airport at 06:45 on September 11, 2001. Upon check-in, all three men were selected by the Computer Assisted Passenger Prescreening System (CAPPS) for further screening of their checked baggage. As the CAPPS was only for luggage, the three hijackers did not undergo any extra scrutiny at the passenger security checkpoint.

By 07:40, all five hijackers were aboard the flight, which was scheduled to depart at 07:45. Wail and Waleed al-Shehri sat together in first class in seats 2A and 2B respectively. The aircraft taxied away from Gate 26, and departed Logan International Airport at 07:59, following a 14-minute delay. Flight 11 was hijacked at approximately 08:14, which is when the pilot stopped responding to air traffic control. It is suspected that the brothers stabbed two flight attendants in the hijacking. At 08:46:40, Mohamed Atta, who was flying the plane, deliberately crashed Flight 11 into the northern facade of the North Tower (Tower 1) of the World Trade Center between floors 93 and 99. The immediate damage destroyed any means of escape from above the impact zone, killing and trapping 1,344 people. The North Tower collapsed at 10:28, after burning for 102 minutes.

== Aftermath ==
Waleed al-Shehri was reported to have been found alive by a BBC News article on September 23, 2001, and other news reports in the aftermath of the September 11 attacks. Reports said that the al-Shehri brothers were the sons of a Saudi diplomat stationed in New Delhi, Ahmed al-Shehri. The diplomat's son was trained as a pilot at Embry-Riddle Aeronautical University in Daytona Beach, Florida, and was working as a pilot for Saudi Arabian Airlines. At the time of the attacks, he was in Morocco for a training program. There were also reports that Wail al-Shehri was a trained pilot. In the aftermath of the September 11 attacks, Saudi officials suggested that Wail and Waleed al-Shehri were victims of identity theft, but the diplomat's son was the victim of mistaken identity.

Jamal Khashoggi, of Al Watan and Arab News in Saudi Arabia, spoke with Muhammad Ali al-Shehri in Khamis Mushait, who said his sons Wail and Waleed had been missing for months. He denied reports that Wail had an aeronautics degree, as some news reports said, "My son Wail was 25 years old and had a BA in physical education from the Abha Teacher’s College. He was mentally ill and had gone to numerous clerics for assistance in overcoming this instability. He had asked the school, where he taught, for a 6-month leave to go to Madinah." His father also told reporters that he dreaded having to believe that his sons were involved in the September 11 attacks, saying, "If that turns out to be the truth, then I'll never, never accept it from them. I'll never forgive them for that." Family members said that Wail and Waleed became very religious in the months before they disappeared, had expressed interest in going to Chechnya, and hoped for martyrdom. In a report entitled "A Saudi Apology" for Dateline NBC aired on August 25, 2002, John Hockenberry traveled to Asir, where he interviewed another al-Shehri brother, Salah, who agreed that Wail and Waleed were deceased. Salah described them as not very religious, and suggested they had been brainwashed.

Saudi officials later stated that the names of the hijackers were in fact correct, and that 15 of the 19 hijackers were Saudi. In response to 9/11 conspiracy theories surrounding its original news story suggesting hijackers were still alive, the BBC stated in 2006 that later reports on the hijackers superseded the original story. The BBC also explained that confusion arose with the Arabic names that were common.

== See also ==
- Hijackers in the September 11 attacks
- PENTTBOM – FBI probe into the 9/11 attacks
