= Ahmed al-Nami =

Saudi terrorist and 9/11 hijacker (1977–2001)

- أحمد النعمي
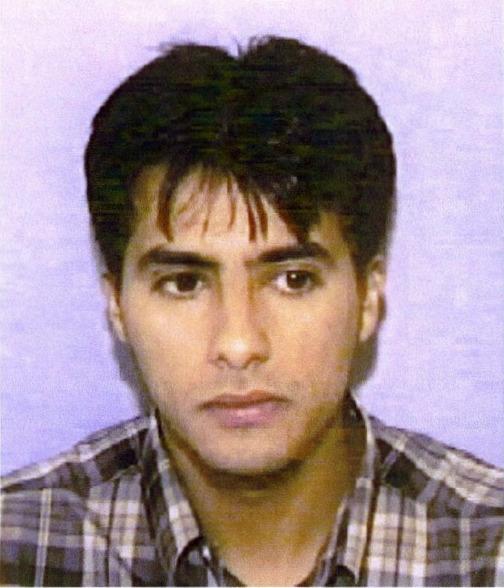
- Al-Nami in June 2001
- Born: December 7, 1977 'Asir Province, Saudi Arabia
- Died: September 11, 2001 (aged 23); Stonycreek Township, Somerset County, Pennsylvania, U.S.
- Cause of death: Suicide by plane crash or overpowered by passengers (September 11 attacks)
- Known for: Muscle hijacker of United Airlines Flight 93 as part of the September 11 attacks

Ahmed bin Abdullah al-Nami (Arabic: أحمد بن عبد الله النعمي, romanized: Aḥmad bin 'Abd Allāh al-Nāʿmī; December 7, 1977 – September 11, 2001) was a Saudi terrorist hijacker. He was one of the four hijackers of United Airlines Flight 93, which was crashed into a field in Stonycreek Township, Pennsylvania, following a passenger revolt, as part of the September 11 attacks.

Born in Saudi Arabia, al-Nami had served as a muezzin and was a college student. He left his family in 2000 to complete the Hajj, but later went to Afghanistan bound for an al-Qaeda training camp where he befriended other future hijackers and would soon be chosen to participate in the attacks.

He arrived in the United States in May 2001, on a tourist visa, where he would settle in Florida up until the attacks. On 11 September 2001, al-Nami boarded United 93 and assisted in the hijacking of the plane so that it could be flown into an iconic building, likely the U.S. Capitol or the White House. The plane instead crashed into a field in rural Somerset County, Pennsylvania during a passenger uprising, due to the passengers receiving information from their families of the three other hijacked planes that hit the World Trade Center and the Pentagon. Al-Nami, along with Ahmed al-Haznawi, are suspected to have carried the presumed bomb that was brought aboard Flight 93.

== Early life and activities ==
Ahmed al-Nami, like Wail al-Shehri, Waleed al-Shehri, and Mohand al-Shehri, was born in the 'Asir Province in Saudi Arabia. Born to the Quraysh tribe of Saudi Arabia, al-Nami served as a muezzin at the Seqeley mosque after having reportedly become very religious sometime in early 1999. That autumn he left his family home in Abha in the summer of 2000 to complete the Hajj, but never returned – instead travelling to the Al Farouq training camp in Afghanistan where he met and befriended Waleed and Wail al-Shehri, two brothers from Khamis Mushayt in the same province, and Saeed al-Ghamdi. The four reportedly pledged themselves to Jihad in the spring of 2000, in a ceremony presided over by Wail al-Shehri – who had dubbed himself Abu Mossaeb al-Janubi after one of Muhammad's companions. Dubbed "Abu Hashim", al-Nami was considered "gentle in manner" by his colleagues, and reported that he had a dream in which he rode a mare along with Muhammad, and that the prophet told him to dismount and fight his enemies to liberate his land.

By October he had taken a prospective hijacker Mushabib al-Hamlan from Afghanistan to Saudi Arabia where they both procured B-1/B-2 tourist/business visas on 28 October – but al-Hamlan then decided not to proceed and is thought to have returned to his family. Al-Nami's visa application has since been reviewed, and while he mentioned that al-Hamlan will be travelling with him, he listed his occupation as student but failed to provide an address for his school, and listed his intended address in the United States merely as Los Angeles – in the end he never used this visa to enter the United States, and reported his passport (C115007, which showed evidence of travel to Afghanistan) as "lost", and procured a new one from Jeddah (C505363). He used the new passport to acquire a new B-1/B-2 visa in Jeddah on 23 April, again recopying his answers from previously although crossing out the lines regarding al-Hamlan and previous attempts to acquire a visa. He was interviewed by a consular officer, who again approved his application. Records at the time only recorded past failures to procure a visa, so the officer had no way of realising that al-Nami had successfully received an earlier visa.

In mid-November 2000, the 9/11 Commission believed that al-Nami, Wail, and Waleed al-Shehri, all of whom had obtained their U.S. visas in late October, traveled in a group from Saudi Arabia to Beirut and then onward to Iran where they could travel through to Afghanistan without getting their passports stamped. This probably followed their return to Saudi Arabia to get "clean" passports. An associate of a senior Hezbollah operative is thought to have been on the same flight, although this may have been a coincidence.

While in the United Arab Emirates, al-Nami purchased traveler's cheques presumed to have been paid for by Mustafa al-Hawsawi. Five other hijackers also passed through the UAE and purchased travellers cheques, including Majed Moqed, Saeed al-Ghamdi, Hamza al-Ghamdi, Ahmed al-Haznawi, and Wail al-Shehri.

=== 2001 ===
In March 2001, Ahmed al-Nami appeared in an al-Qaeda farewell video showing 13 of the "muscle hijackers" before they left their training centre in Kandahar; while he does not speak, he is seen studying maps and flight manuals.

On 23 April, al-Nami was recorded obtaining a new US visa.

On 28 May, al-Nami arrived in the United States from Dubai with fellow-hijackers Mohand al-Shehri and Hamza al-Ghamdi. By early June, al-Nami was living in apartment 1504 at the Delray Racquet Club condominiums with Saeed al-Ghamdi in Delray Beach, Florida. He telephoned his family in 'Asir shortly after arriving in the country.

In June, he phoned his family for the last time.

He was one of 9 hijackers to open a SunTrust bank account with a cash deposit around June 2001, and on June 29 received a Florida State Identification Card.

On 28 August, al-Nami and Ahmed al-Haznawi reportedly bothered a Delray Beach resident, Maria Siscar Simpson, to let them through her apartment to retrieve a towel that had fallen off their balcony onto hers.

On 5 September, al-Nami and Saeed al-Ghamdi purchased tickets for a September 7 flight to Newark at Mile High Travel on Commercial Boulevard—paying cash for their tickets. Ziad Jarrah and al-Haznawi also purchased tickets for the same flight from Passage Tours.

On 7 September, all four Flight 93 hijackers flew from Fort Lauderdale to Newark International Airport aboard Spirit Airlines.

== Attacks ==
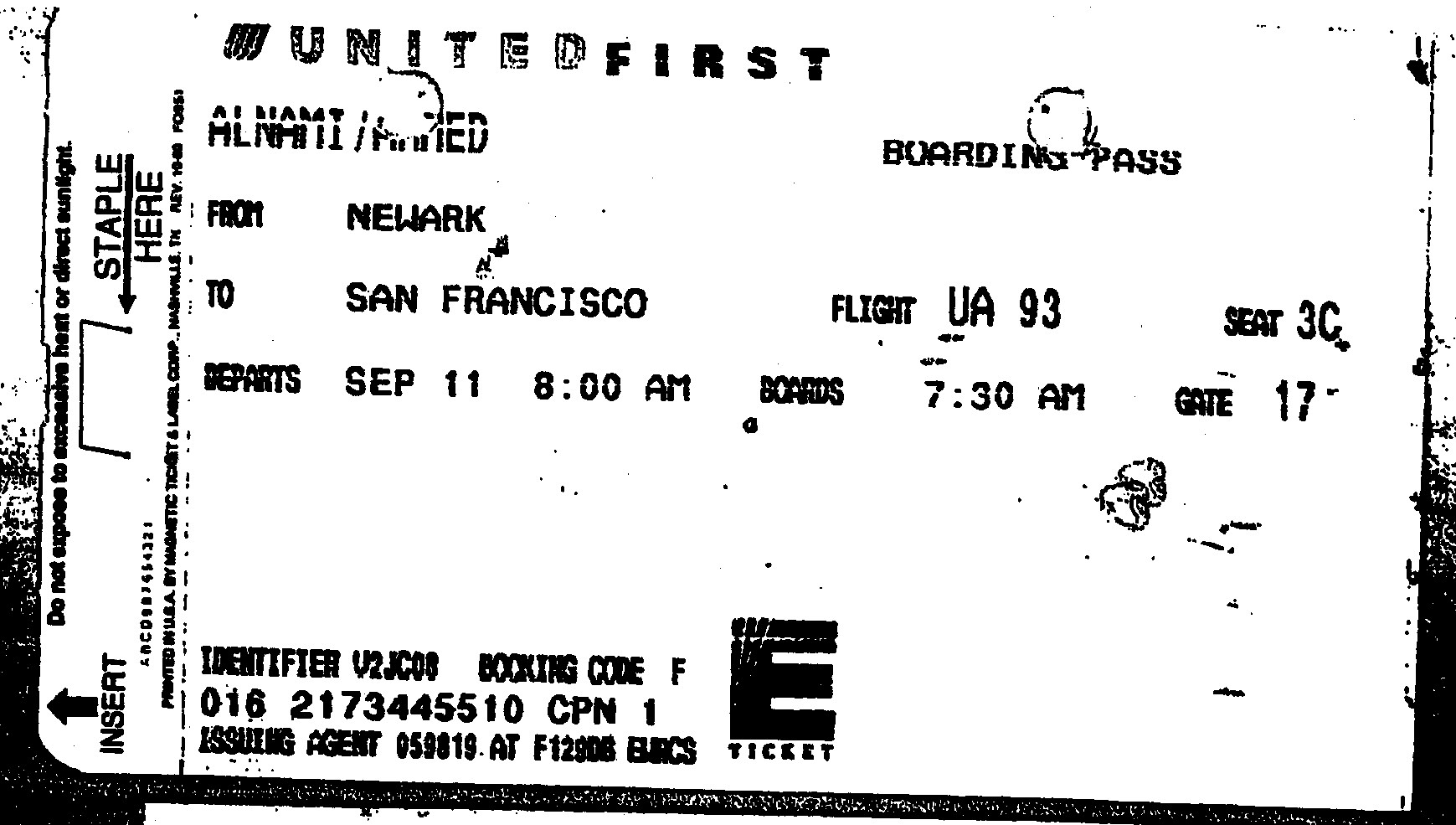
Ahmed al-Nami's boarding pass for Flight 93

On 11 September 2001, al-Nami arrived in Newark to board United Airlines Flight 93 along with al-Ghamdi, al-Haznawi, and Jarrah. Some reports suggest al-Haznawi was pulled aside for screening while others claim there is no record of whether any of the four were screened; the lack of CCTV cameras at the time has compounded the problem. Al-Nami boarded the plane between 7:39 am and 7:48 am; seated in First Class 3C, next to al-Ghamdi.

Due to the flight's routine delay, the pilot and crew were notified of the previous hijackings and were told to be on the alert, though within two minutes Jarrah had stormed the cockpit leaving the pilots dead or injured.

At least two of the cellphone calls made by passengers indicate that the hijackers were wearing red bandanas. The calls also indicated that one had tied a box around his torso, and claimed there was a bomb inside.

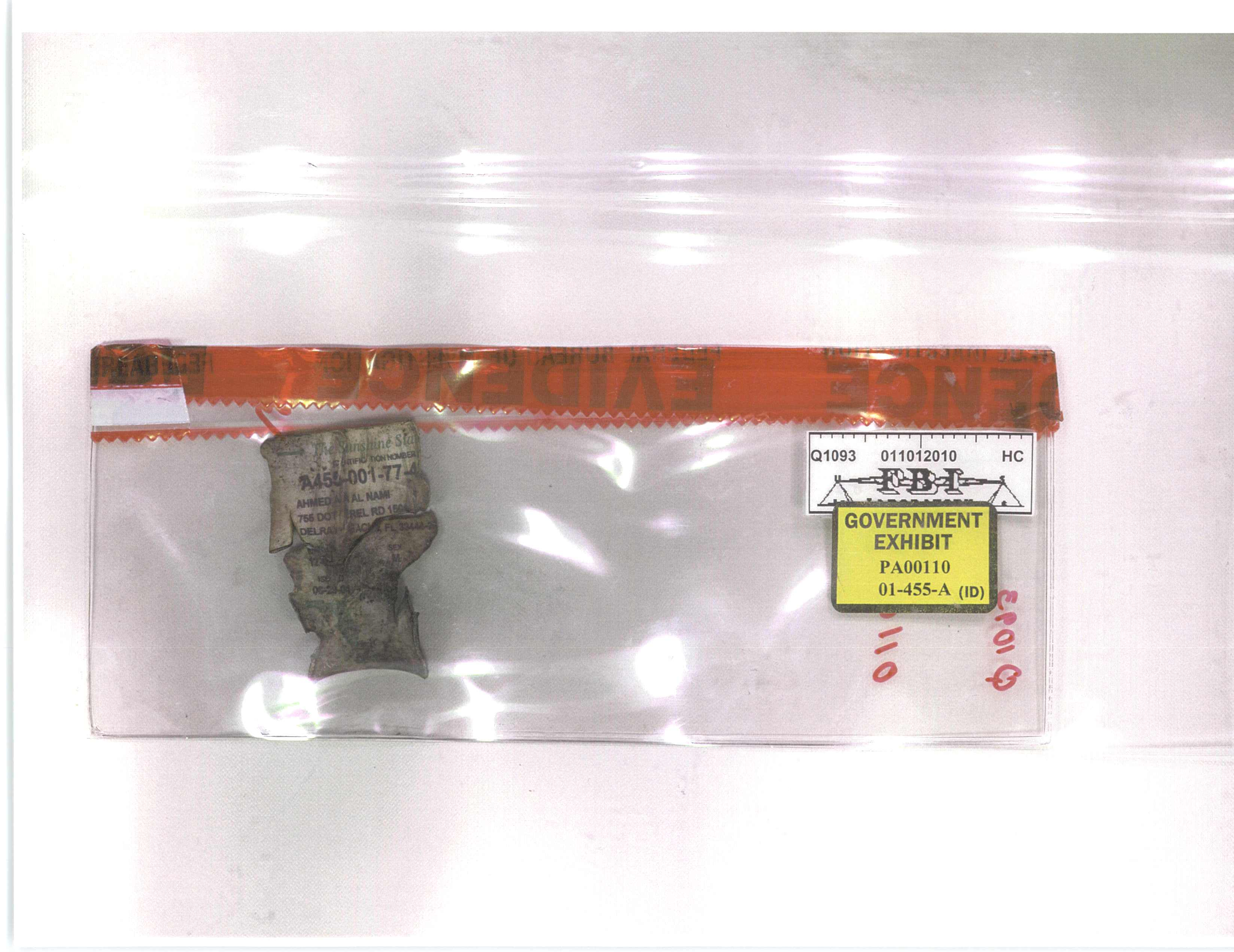
Remains of Ahmed al-Nami's Florida ID card that were recovered from the United Airlines Flight 93 crash site

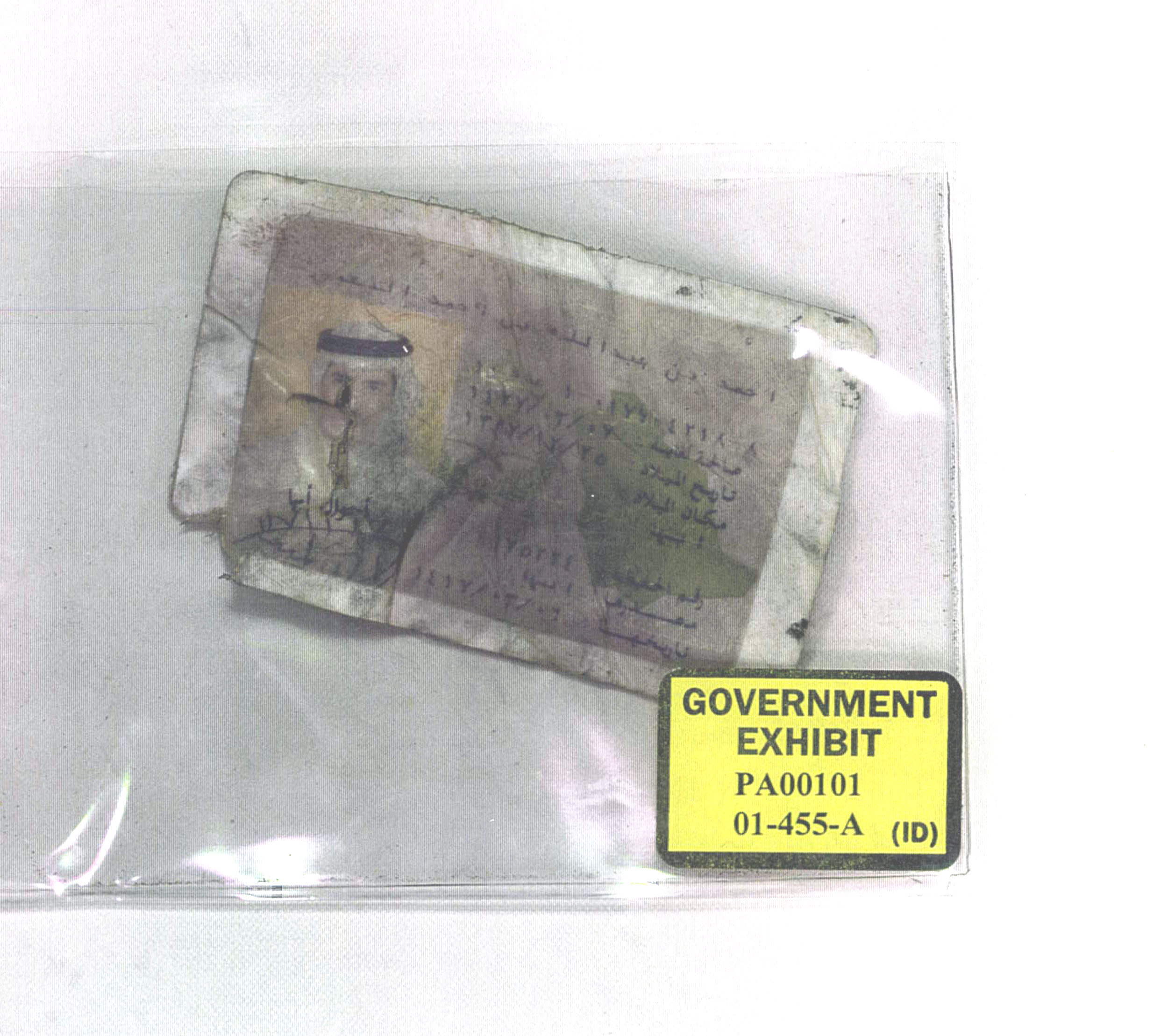
Ahmed al-Nami's Kingdom of Saudi Arabia Identification Card that was recovered from the United Airlines Flight 93 crash site

Passengers on the plane heard through phone calls the fates of the other hijacked planes, and organized a brief assault to retake the cockpit. The plane crashed into the Pennsylvanian countryside and all aboard died.

His Saudi Arabia ID card, Saudi Arabian Youth Hostels Association Identification Card, two photographs of him, and the remains of his Florida ID card were recovered from the crash site.

== Aftermath ==
- He has been portrayed by Raj Mann in the 2005 television film The Flight That Fought Back, British actor Jamie Harding in the 2006 film United 93, and Asim Wali in the film Flight 93.

== See also ==
- PENTTBOM
- Hijackers in the 11 September attacks
