= Majed Moqed =

Saudi terrorist and 9/11 hijacker (1977–2001)

- ماجد موقد
- Moqed in August 2001
- Born: Majed Mashaan Ghanem Moqed; June 18, 1977; Medina, Saudi Arabia
- Died: September 11, 2001 (aged 24); Arlington County, Virginia, U.S.
- Cause of death: Suicide by plane crash against the Pentagon (September 11 attacks)
- Known for: Muscle hijacker of American Airlines Flight 77 as part of the September 11 attacks

Majed Mashaan Ghanem Moqed (Arabic: ماجد مشعان غانم موقد, romanized: Mājad Mūqad; June 18, 1977 – September 11, 2001) was a Saudi terrorist who was a member of al-Qaeda. During the September 11 attacks against the United States in 2001, he was one of 19 al-Qaeda members who hijacked four airliners in an attempt to crash them into American landmarks. Moqed was in the group that took control of American Airlines Flight 77 and crashed it into the Pentagon, near Washington, D.C.

Moqed grew up near Medina in Saudi Arabia. He studied law at a Saudi university, before being recruited by al-Qaeda in 1999. He was personally selected by Ramzi bin al-Shibh to carry out the organization's hijacking plan. Moqed recruited his friend from university, Satam al-Suqami, to train with him at an al-Qaeda base in Afghanistan. Al-Suqami became a hijacker of American Airlines Flight 11 in the attacks.

Moqed arrived in the U.S. in May 2001. On 11 September 2001, he and four others hijacked Flight 77, scheduled to depart Dulles, Virginia, towards Los Angeles, while the flight was in progress. Hani Hanjour took control of the plane and crashed into the Pentagon. All 64 onboard died, including the hijackers, as well 125 people on the ground.

== Early life and activities ==
Majed Moqed was from the small town of Al-Nakhil in Saudi Arabia, west of Medina. His family later recalled that he was into sports and travelling. He studied law at the King Fahd University of Petroleum and Minerals in Dhahran, Saudi Arabia, and joined the Faculty of Administration and Economics there.

== Planning of the September 11 attacks ==
Moqed was involved in al-Qaeda's terrorist attacks against the United States on September 11, 2001. They involved Moqed and 18 other men hijacking four airliners and crashing them into American landmarks. American Airlines Flight 11 and United Airlines Flight 175 were crashed into 1 and 2 World Trade Center in New York City, American Airlines Flight 77 into the Pentagon in Washington D.C., and United Airlines Flight 93 was likely going to be crashed into an unknown target in Washington D.C., but instead crashed in Pennsylvania after the passengers revolted against the hijackers. Moqed was in the group that hijacked Flight 77.

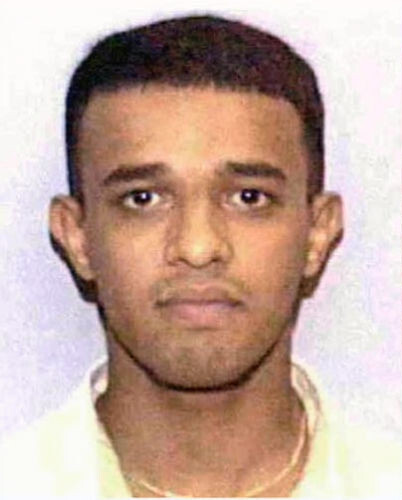
Satam al-Suqami, Moqed's friend that he recruited into al-Qaeda, and later became a hijacker on September 11

In 1999, while at university, Moqed was recruited by al-Qaeda. He recruited his friend, Satam al-Suqami, to join him in training at an al-Qaeda base in Afghanistan. At the time, Afghanistan's Taliban government allowed the organization to use the country as their base of operations. The two trained at Khalden, a large facility ran by Ibn al-Shaykh al-Libi near Kabul. al-Suqami later became a hijacker of Flight 11.

A friend in Saudi Arabia claimed Moqed was last seen in Saudi Arabia in 2000, who said he would move to the United States to study English. In November 2000, Moqed and al-Suqami flew into Iran from Bahrain together. Some time in late 2000, Moqed traveled to the United Arab Emirates (UAE), where he purchased traveller's cheques presumed to have been paid for by September 11 financier Mustafa Ahmed al-Hawsawi. Five other hijackers also passed through the UAE and purchased traveller's cheques: Wail al-Shehri, Saeed al-Ghamdi, Hamza al-Ghamdi, Ahmed al-Haznawi, and Ahmed al-Nami.

=== In the United States ===
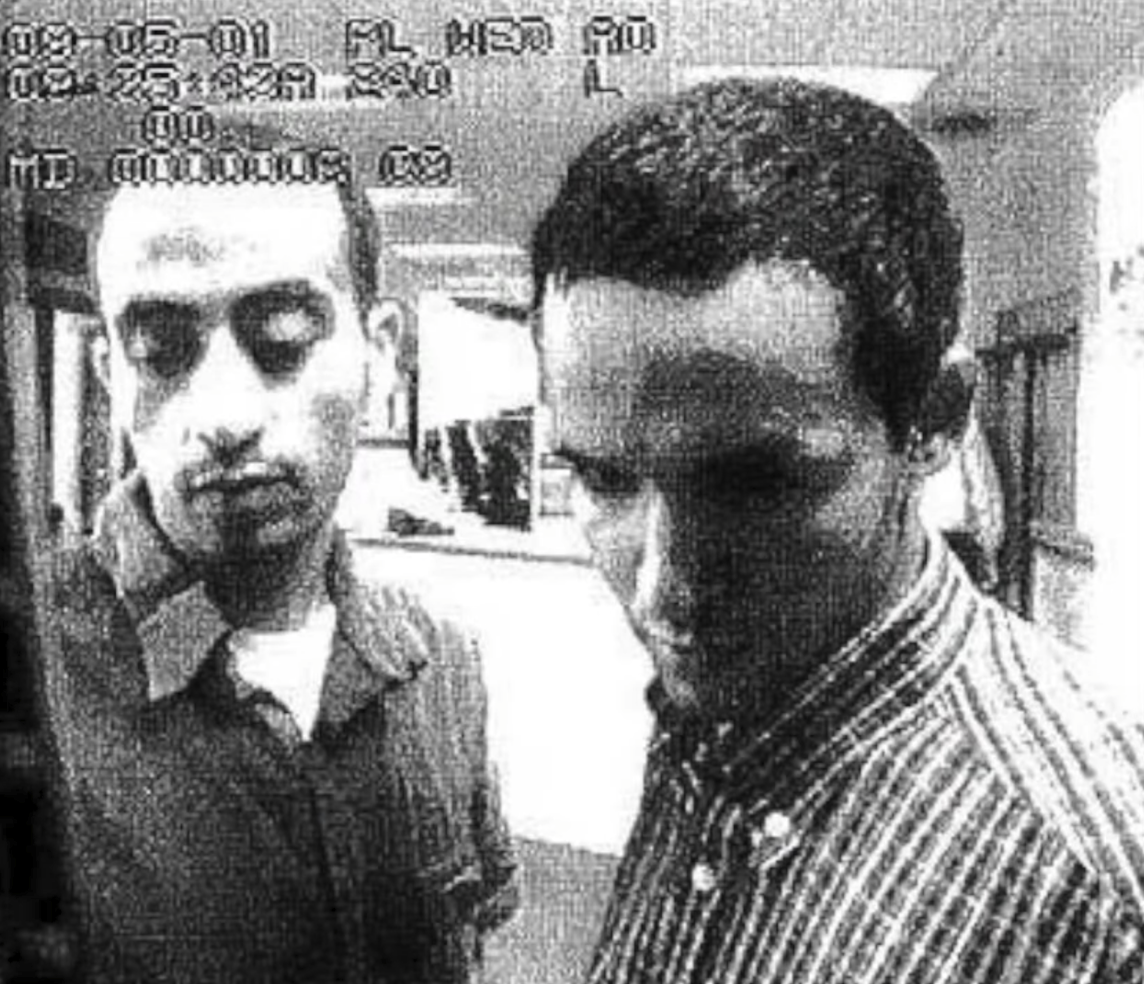
Moqed, along with Hani Hanjour, on September 5, 2001, on CCTV footage

Moqed was known as al-Ahlaf during the attack preparations. He first arrived in the U.S. on or around 2 May 2001 with Flight 175 hijacker Ahmed al-Ghamdi. Until September, he lived in a one-bedroom apartment in Paterson, New Jersey, that cost $650 a month. Ahmed and two Flight 77 hijackers, brothers Nawaf and Salem al-Hazmi, were his roommates at various times.

Moqed was one of six hijackers who asked for a state ID card on 1 and 2 August. On 24 August, both al-Mihdhar and Moqed tried to purchase flight tickets from American Airlines online, but had technical difficulties in entering their address, and gave up. Around this time, Moqed was staying in Room 343 of the Valencia Motel in Laurel, Maryland. On 2 September, Moqed paid cash for a $30 weekly membership at a Gold's Gym in Greenbelt, Maryland.

On 31 August, Moqed and Hanjour went to ATS Travel, a travel agency in Totowa, New Jersey, which was near Paterson. Moqed spoke for the two, and first asked the agents for two first class seats on a morning flight to Los Angeles on 11 September. The agents told them one ticket would cost $1,842 if they departed from Dulles International Airport in Dulles, Virginia, or $2,220 from Newark, New Jersey. Moqed went with Dulles, but decided to only buy a ticket for Hanjour, in seat 1B in the front aisle of the cabin. The two tried to pay for it with a credit card, which declined, so they left, and Moqed withdrew the exact amount of cash for the ticket from a Hudson United Bank nearby. They returned and got the ticket.

A manager at Adult Lingerie Center, an adult video store in Beltsville, Maryland, later recalled that Moqed had been in the store three times around early September. On 5 September, Moqed and al-Mihdhar went together to the American Airlines counter at BWI Airport in Baltimore, and paid cash to purchase their tickets for Flight 77 on the 11th. It was scheduled to depart Dulles Airport towards Los Angeles. Moqed purchased seat 12A, adjacent to al-Mihdhar in 12B.

== September 11 attacks ==
On the morning of 11 September 2001, Moqed, age 24, arrived at Dulles Airport, along with Hani Hanjour, Khalid al-Mihdhar, Nawaf al-Hazmi, and Salem al-Hazmi. When he and al-Mihdhar passed through airport security at 7:18 a.m. ET, both set off a metal detector. The security agents moved them to a second detector, which al-Mihdhar passed through without alarm, while Moqed set it off again. The latter was then subjected to a metal detector hand wand, which brought up no issues, and he was allowed to continue. The al-Hazmis also set off alarms, but were cleared. In violation of Federal Aviation Administration policy, the security agents likely did not check the carry-on bags of the four who set off alarms. There were 64 passengers on Flight 77, including the hijackers.

Security camera footage of Flight 77 hitting the Pentagon. Impact is at 01:27.

Flight 77 departed Dulles at 8:20 a.m. The last normal radio communications from Flight 77 to air traffic control occurred at 8:50. It began to deviate from its normal, assigned flight path at 8:54. It then turned south, and a hijacker set the autopilot to be on course to Washington, D.C. At 9:37, Flight 77 crashed into the west facade of the Pentagon, killing all 64 aboard, along with 125 on the ground in the Pentagon.

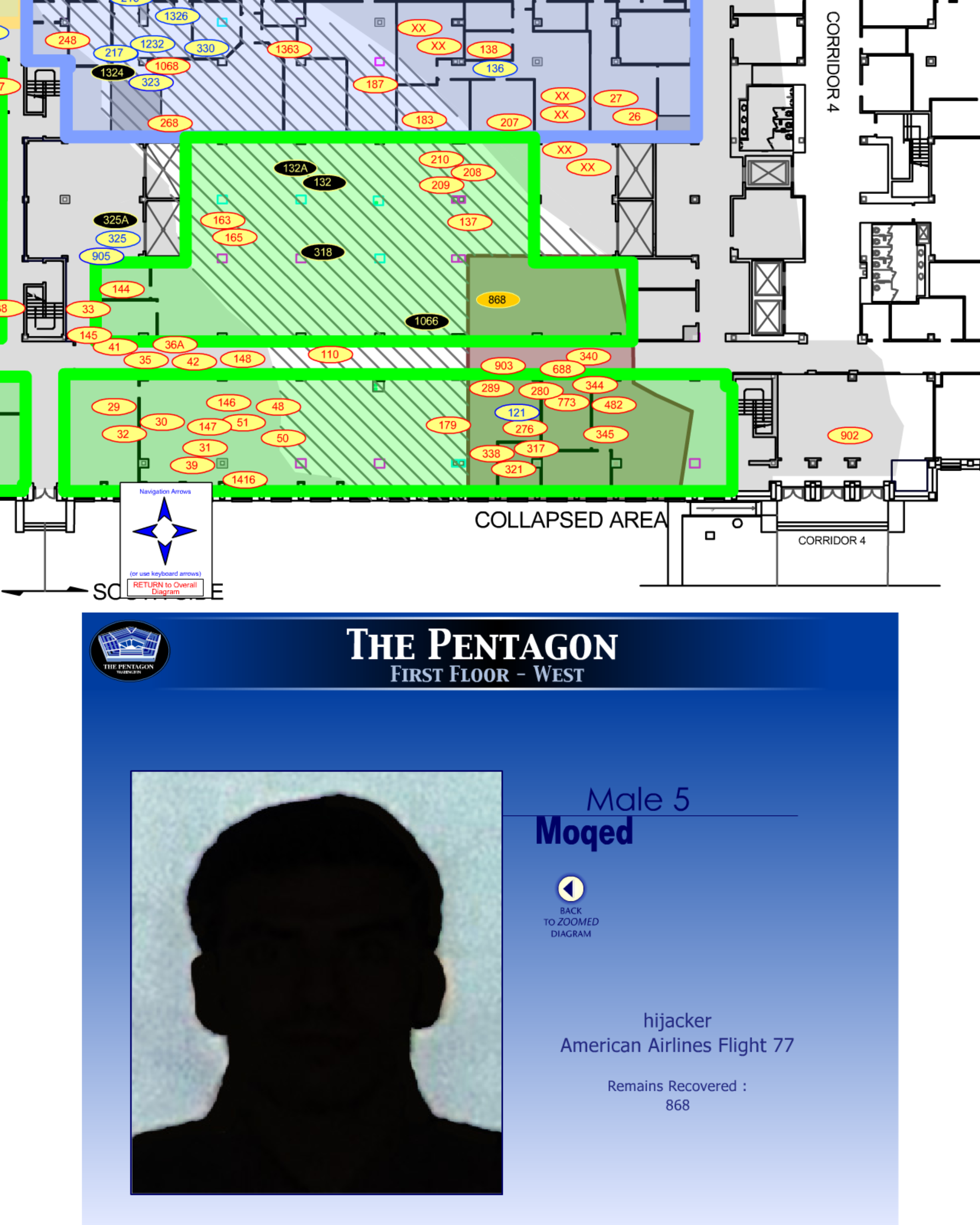
Information about the recovery of Moqed's remains (868) from a Moussaoui trial presentation.

In the investigation and cleanup at the Pentagon, remains of all five Flight 77 hijackers were identified through a process of elimination as not matching any DNA samples for the victims. The remains were put into custody of the Federal Bureau of Investigation. His Virginia identification card was found in the debris on 16 September. Later on 24 September, his Visa Check Card and a "Kingdom of Saudi Arabia Student Identity Card" bearing Moqed's name was found in the debris, which appeared to have been a forgery.

== See also ==
- Hijackers in the September 11 attacks
