= Abdulaziz al-Omari =

Saudi terrorist and 9/11 hijacker (1979–2001)

- عبد العزيز العمري
- Al-Omari's International Driver's License photo
- Born: May 28, 1979; Asir, Saudi Arabia
- Died: September 11, 2001 (aged 22); New York City, U.S.
- Cause of death: Suicide by plane crash against the North Tower during the September 11 attacks
- Education: Imam Mohammad Ibn Saud Islamic University
- Known for: Muscle hijacker of American Airlines Flight 11 as part of the September 11 attacks

Abdulaziz al-Omari (Note: Arabic: عبد العزيز العُمري, ʿAbd al-ʿAzīz al-ʿUmarī, also transliterated as Alomari or al-Umari) (May 28, 1979 – September 11, 2001) was a Saudi imam and terrorist who was one of five hijackers of American Airlines Flight 11 as part of the September 11 attacks in 2001. He accompanied Mohamed Atta before the attack and boarded the airplane with him.

Prior to the attacks, al-Omari was an imam at his mosque in Saudi Arabia's al-Qassim province. He arrived in the United States in June 2001 on a tourist visa, obtained through the Visa Express program. On September 11, 2001, al-Omari boarded American Airlines Flight 11 and assisted in the hijacking of the plane, which was crashed into the North Tower of the World Trade Center, as part of the coordinated attacks.

== Early life and career ==
Abdulaziz al-Omari was born on May 28, 1979 into a poor, conservative Arab family. He was born in Asir, Saudi Arabia and was a fellow countryman of brothers Wail al-Shehri and Waleed al-Shehri, fellow hijackers in the September 11 attacks. It is alleged he graduated with honors from high school.

He attained a degree from Imam Muhammad ibn Saud Islamic University, got married, and had a daughter shortly before the attacks. He taught as an imam at his mosque in al-Qassim province, which was the "heartland" of Wahhabism, a strict form of Islam. At the mosque, he was possibly taught by the radical cleric Sulayman al Alwan.

According to Walid bin Attash, al-Omari was one of a group of future hijackers who provided security at Kandahar airport after their basic training at an al-Qaeda camp. During the 2000 al-Qaeda summit in Kuala Lumpur, American authorities state that immigration records show that a person named Abdulaziz al-Omari was visiting the country, although they say they are not sure that this was the same person.

== September 11 attacks ==
=== Early 2001 ===
Al-Omari eventually became involved in the planning for the September 11 attacks on the United States, an idea formulated by Osama bin Laden. The attacks involved hijacking commercial airplanes and crashing them into buildings; al-Omari would hijack American Airlines Flight 11, which would crash into the World Trade Center in New York City. At the time of the hijacking, al-Omari was 22. In the autumn of 2001, after the attacks, Al Jazeera television broadcast a tape they claim was made by him. The speaker made a farewell suicide video. In it he read, "I am writing this with my full conscience and I am writing this in expectation of the end, which is near... God praise everybody who trained and helped me, namely the leader Sheikh Osama bin Laden."

Abdulaziz al-Omari's U.S. visa and I-94 card

A person with al-Omari's name visited the Philippines twice in February 2001. Al-Omari and hijacker Salem al-Hazmi entered the United States through a Dubai flight on June 29, 2001, landing in New York City. Al-Omari had used the controversial Visa Express program to gain entry. The two were probably picked up by Salem's brother, Nawaf al-Hazmi, on the 30th; this is assumed because of a recorded traffic accident by Nawaf on George Washington Bridge that day. Al-Omari likely stayed with several other hijackers in Paterson, New Jersey (where he rented a mailbox), before moving to his own place in Vero Beach, Florida with his wife and three children. On his rental agreement form for that house, al-Omari gave two license-plates authorized to park in his space, one of which was registered to Mohamed Atta, the attacks' mastermind.

Al-Omari attended the FlightSafety academy in Vero Beach with fellow hijackers Mohand al-Shehri and Saeed al-Ghamdi. He also obtained a fake United States ID card from All Services Plus in Passaic County, New Jersey, which was in the business of selling fake documents; another was given to Khalid al-Mihdhar. The employee who gave them the IDs claimed he had no idea they were "anything more [than ordinary] customers". Atta bought tickets for Flight 11 for himself and al-Omari on August 28. On September 6, al-Omari and fellow hijacker Satam al-Suqami flew from Florida to Boston to stay at the Park Inn Hotel.

=== September 10 ===
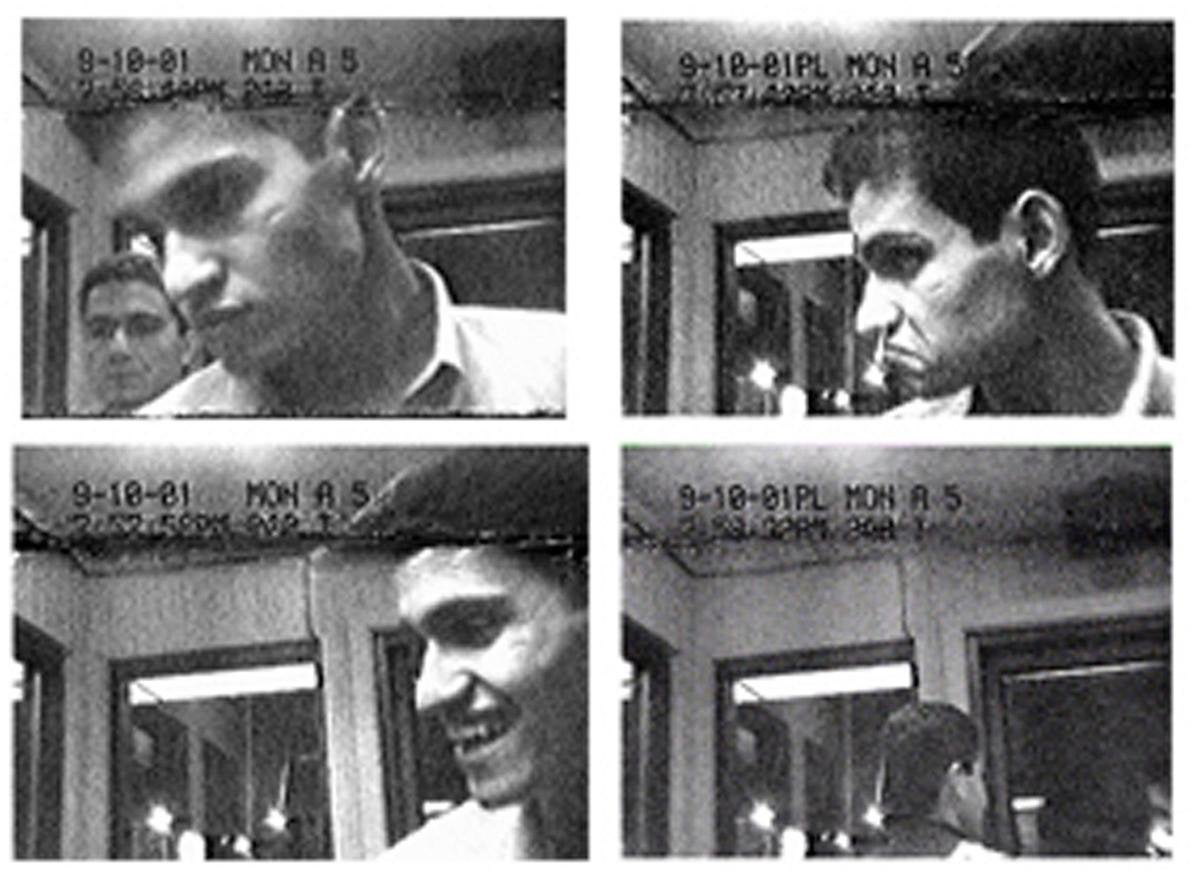
Al-Omari (foreground) and Mohamed Atta (background) at an ATM in South Portland, Maine at 8:41 p.m. on September 10, 2001

On September 10, 2001, Atta picked up al-Omari from the Park Inn Hotel, and the two drove to South Portland, Maine, in a rented Nissan Altima. Some sources state there is no evidence as to why they went to Portland, whereas ABC News says it was a last-minute decision by Atta to stagger the Flight 11 hijackers' entrances into Logan International Airport on the 11th. Multiple people have claimed to see Atta and other hijackers in Portland that summer, but the FBI has found no evidence of this. On the 10th, Atta and al-Omari purchased a room (233) at the town's Comfort Inn. They did not ask for a wake-up call. Their luggage included a folding knife, "a videocassette [about] a Boeing 757 flight simulator, pepper spray, Atta’s will, [and Atta's] handwritten instructions to his 18 fellow hijackers"; American Airlines Flight 11 was a Boeing 767.

They stayed in their hotel room for two hours, until 8 p.m., when al-Omari made a four-minute phone call from a nearby Pizza Hut's pay phone to a phone belonging to Marwan al-Shehhi, who would hijack United Airlines Flight 175, and sometime between 8-9 p.m. that night, Atta and Al-Omari ate their last meal, a vegetarian pizza, at the Pizza Hut, and were there for approximately 15 minutes. At 8:31 p.m, their car was photographed at a KeyBank ATM. Ten minutes later, at 8:41 p.m., at a restaurant named Pizzeria Uno, the two withdrew $80 from an ATM and were also photographed by the ATM's camera. They then drove back to the Pizza Hut, where a second pay phone call was placed at 8:50 p.m. At 9:15 PM, the duo were seen at a Jetport Gas Station on CCTV Camera. Seven minutes later, at 9:22 p.m., Atta was photographed at Walmart, but it is not known if he bought anything that night. Staff of the Walmart said that weeks earlier, Atta had bought a box cutter there, but this is uncorroborated. The two then returned to the Comfort Inn, where they stayed at for the rest of the night.

=== Day of the attacks ===
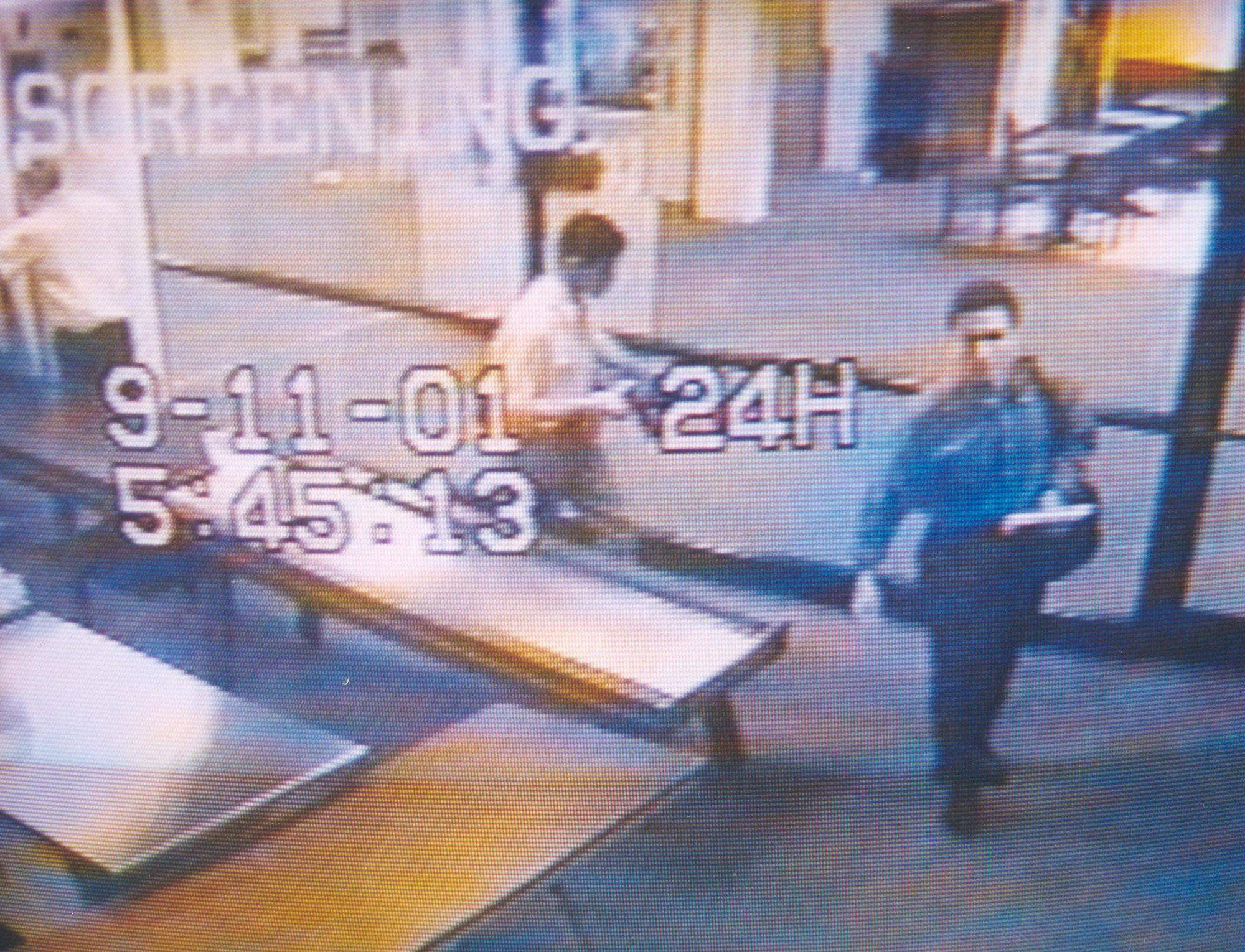
Atta (blue shirt) and al-Omari in the Portland International Jetport in Portland, Maine, on the morning of September 11, 2001

At 5:33 a.m. on September 11, al-Omari and Atta checked out of the hotel. Al-Omari made another cash withdrawal at the Pizzeria Uno ATM, and then the two went to Portland International Jetport. At around 5:40, the two spoke with a ticket agent, who raised no suspicions about them. Both men boarded their flight, which landed in Logan International Airport at 6:45. Eight other hijackers were waiting at the airport. It is unknown why this connecting flight through Portland happened, especially because the two almost missed their flight at Logan. Their flight, American 11, was supposed to fly to Los Angeles.

Atta and al-Omari then boarded Flight 11 with fellow hijackers Satam al-Suqami, Wail al-Shehri, and Waleed al-Shehri. The other hijackers at the airport went on United Airlines Flight 175. Al-Omari's passport, which would identify him as a hijacker to investigators later, was in the two men's aforementioned luggage; this luggage was accidentally left at Portland International Airport, failing to make it onto the connecting flight to Logan. The two men probably decided they did not need the luggage's folding knife and pepper spray in their attacks. Atta and al-Omari had seats next to each other in business class, row 8, on Flight 11. The flight left the Logan runway at 7:59. The hijackers took over the plane starting at 8:14, when multiple passengers were maced and stabbed. Atta then commandeered the plane's controls, and at 8:37, the plane began a rapid descent. At 8:46, it was crashed into the World Trade Center's North Tower, and everyone onboard was killed. Floors 93 to 99 were impacted, and many inside died.

== Aftermath ==
Controversy over the identity of al-Omari erupted shortly after the attacks. At first, the FBI had named Abdul Rahman al-Omari, a pilot for Saudi Arabian Airlines, as the pilot of Flight 11. It was quickly shown that this person was still alive, and the FBI issued an apology. It was also quickly determined that Mohamed Atta was the pilot among the hijackers. The FBI then named Abdulaziz al-Omari as a hijacker.

A man with the same name as those given by the FBI turned up alive in Saudi Arabia, saying that he had studied at the University of Denver and his passport was stolen there in 1995. The name, origin, birth date, and occupation were released by the FBI, but the picture was not of him. "I couldn't believe it when the FBI put me on their list", he said. "They gave my name and my date of birth, but I am not a suicide bomber. I am here. I am alive. I have no idea how to fly a plane. I had nothing to do with this."

The FBI gave a press conference on October 5, 2001, where they gave details regarding Atta and the real al-Omari's movements on September 10 and 11.

== See also ==
- PENTTBOM
- Hijackers in the 11 September attacks
