= Ahmed al-Ghamdi =

Saudi terrorist and 9/11 hijacker (1979–2001)

- أحمد الغامدي
- al-Ghamdi in August 2001
- Born: Ahmed Salah Sa'id al-Ghamdi; July 2, 1979; Al-Bahah, Saudi Arabia
- Died: September 11, 2001 (aged 22); New York City, U.S.
- Cause of death: Suicide by plane crash against the South Tower during the September 11 attacks
- Known for: Muscle hijacker of United Airlines Flight 175 as part of the September 11 attacks
- Height: 5 ft 6 in (1.68 m)
- Relatives: Hamza al-Ghamdi (brother)

Ahmed Salih Said al-Kurshi al-Ghamdi (Note: Full name: Aḥmad Ṣalāh Saʿīd al-Ghāmdī, Arabic: احمد صلاح سعيد الغامدي) (July 2, 1979 – September 11, 2001) was a Saudi terrorist hijacker. He was one of five hijackers of United Airlines Flight 175 as part of the September 11 attacks.

Ahmed al-Ghamdi was born in Saudi Arabia in 1979. He dropped out of school to fight in Chechnya and was probably sent to train in al-Qaeda camps in Afghanistan, where he would be chosen by Osama bin Laden to participate in the terrorist attacks in the United States.

He arrived in the United States in May 2001 on a tourist visa and helped in planning the attacks. On September 11, 2001, he boarded United Airlines Flight 175 and assisted in the hijacking of the plane, alongside his younger brother Hamza al-Ghamdi and 3 other terrorists, which allowed lead hijacker and trained pilot Marwan al-Shehhi to take control of the plane and crash it into the South Tower of the World Trade Center, as part of the coordinated attacks.

== Early activities ==
An Imam, al-Ghamdi was from Al Bahah Province in southwestern Saudi Arabia. It is the capital of Al Bahah Province nestled between the resorts of Mecca and Abha, Al Bahah is one of the Kingdom’s prime tourist attractions. Al-Ghamdi shared the same tribal affiliation with fellow hijackers Saeed al-Ghamdi, Hamza al-Ghamdi, and Ahmed al-Haznawi. This group is noted as being some of the more religiously observant of the hijackers, and they are thought to have met each other some time in 1999.

During the preparations, he used the alias al-Jaraah al-Ghamdi, the only hijacker known to have used a variation of his own name. Al-Ghamdi quit school to fight in Chechnya against the Russians in 2000, and received a US Visa on September 3 of that year. In November, both he and Salem al-Hazmi flew to Beirut, though on separate flights and at different times. Al-Ghamdi flew on the same flight as a senior Hezbollah operative, although the 9/11 Commission could find no evidence that either knew the other. His family claims to have last seen him in December.

In March 2001, al-Ghamdi is reported to have met with a Jordanian in Connecticut who has been charged with providing false identification to at least 50 illegal aliens. Hijackers Majed Moqed, Hani Hanjour, and Nawaf al-Hazmi are reported to have met with him at the same time. Inexplicably, this is more than a month before al-Ghamdi first arrived in the United States, according to the FBI and the 9/11 Commission.

On May 2, al-Ghamdi moved from White Bear, Minnesota and arrived in Pensacola, Florida with fellow-hijacker Majed Moqed, on a student visa. He and Moqed moved in with Hani Hanjour and Nawaf al-Hazmi in Falls Church, Virginia. All four later moved into an apartment in Paterson, New Jersey.

He called his parents in July 2001, but did not mention being in the United States.

== Attacks ==
His brother Hamza al-Ghamdi purchased al-Ghamdi's ticket online for United Airlines Flight 175 on 29 or 30 August, after buying his own. He listed a Mail Boxes Etc. address for Ahmed al-Ghamdi.

The brothers stayed at the Charles Hotel in Cambridge, Massachusetts. On September 8, they checked out of the hotel, and moved into the Days Hotel on Soldiers Field Road in Brighton, where they remained up until the day of the attacks.

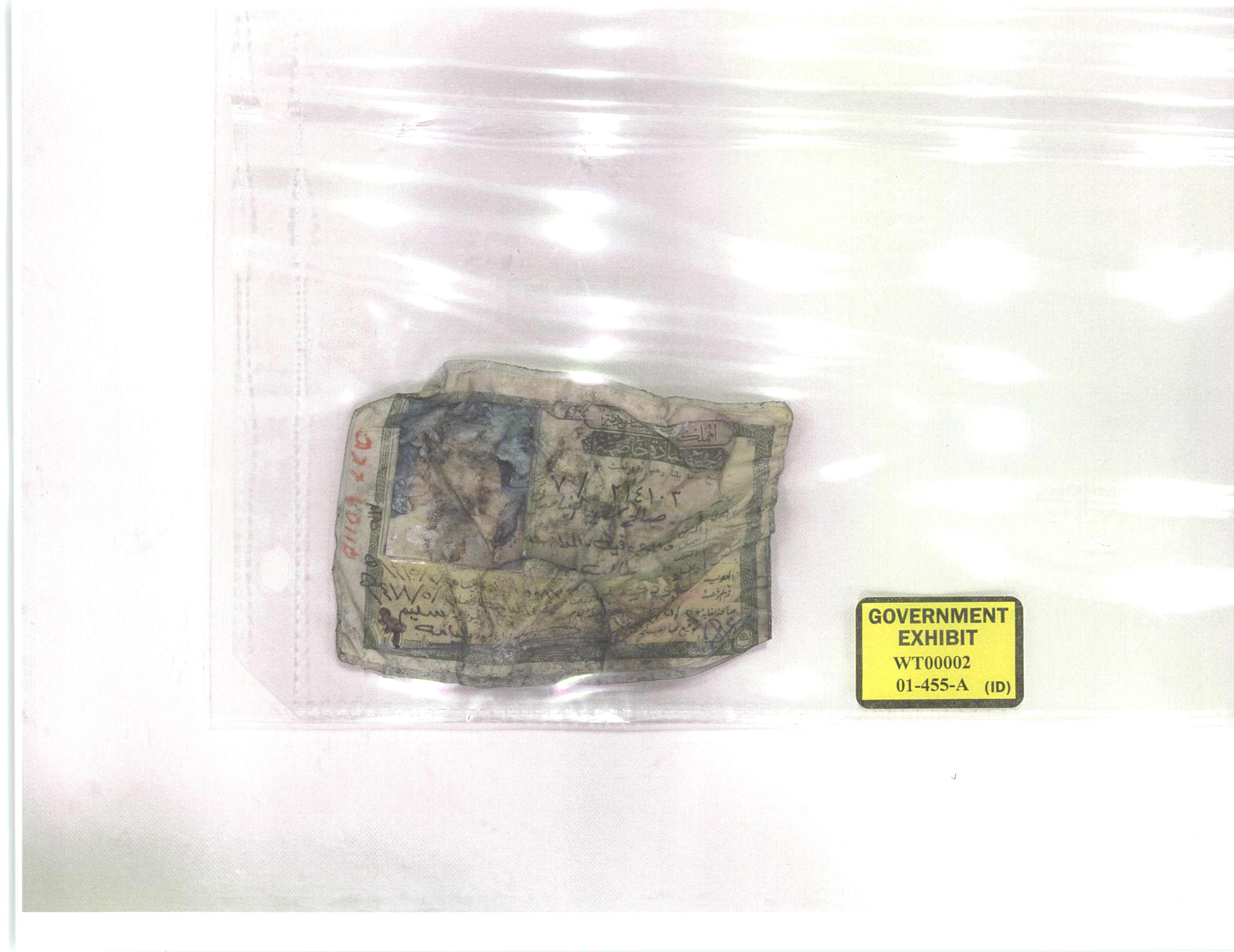
al-Ghamdi's Saudi Arabian Driver's License which was recovered from the World Trade Center site

On the morning of September 11, Ahmed al-Ghamdi left the hotel with his brother, the two of them sharing a taxicab to get to Logan International Airport. There, al-Ghamdi showed his Virginia ID Card as identification, and boarded Flight 175 where he sat the furthest back of the hijackers, in seat 9D, helped to hijack it, and assisted as the plane crashed into the World Trade Center. The brothers pushed the passengers and crew to the back of the plane while Fayez Banihammad and Mohand al-Shehri killed the pilots Victor Saracini and Michael Horrocks allowing Marwan al-Shehhi to take control of the plane.

His Saudi Arabian Driver's License was recovered from the World Trade Center site.

== See also ==
- Hijackers in the September 11 attacks
- PENTTBOM
