= Waleed al-Shehri =

Saudi terrorist and 9/11 hijacker (1978–2001)

- وليد الشهري
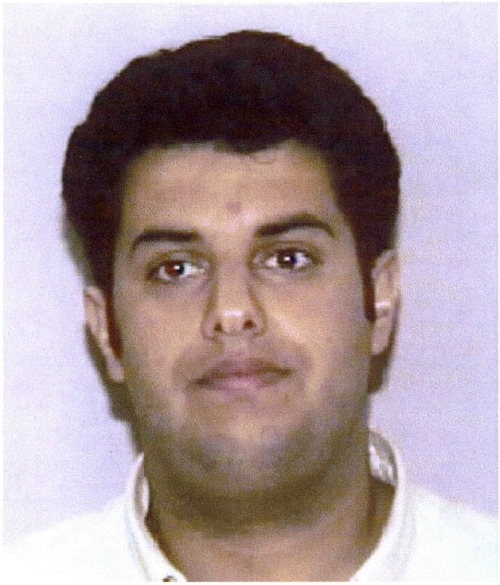
- Al-Shehri in May 2001
- Born: Waleed Mohammed al-Shehri; December 20, 1978; Asir, Saudi Arabia
- Died: September 11, 2001 (aged 22); New York City, U.S.
- Cause of death: Suicide by plane crash against the North Tower (September 11 attacks)
- Known for: Muscle hijacker of American Airlines Flight 11 as part of the September 11 attacks
- Height: 5 ft 6 in (1.68 m)
- Relatives: Wail al-Shehri (brother)
- Military career
- Allegiance: Al-Qaeda
- Engagements: Chechen–Russian conflict; Afghanistan conflict

Waleed Mohammed al-Shehri (Arabic: وليد الشهري, romanized: Walīd ash-Shehrī'; December 20, 1978 – September 11, 2001) was a Saudi terrorist hijacker. He was involved in the September 11 attacks against the United States in 2001. He was one of the five hijackers who took control of American Airlines Flight 11, which was then flown into the North Tower of the World Trade Center.

Born in Saudi Arabia, al-Shehri had been a student until he accompanied his mentally ill brother to Medina. Later, he and his older brother Wail went to Chechnya, where they fought in support of a jihadist insurgency against Russia. However, they were soon redirected to Taliban-controlled Afghanistan, where they were recruited to carry out the September 11 attacks. After their selection, the brothers were moved to a Safe house in Pakistan before flying out to the United Arab Emirates and starting the process to enter the United States.

In April 2001, al-Shehri arrived in the United States on a tourist visa. On the day of the attacks, al-Shehri, his brother, and 3 other terrorists took control of American Airlines Flight 11, following which lead hijacker and suicide pilot Mohamed Atta flew the plane into the North Tower in a suicidal attack.

== Early life and education ==
Al-Shehri was born in ʿAsir Province, Saudi Arabia, on December 20, 1978. Growing up in a poor region of the country, near the border with Yemen, he studied to become a teacher in the footsteps of Wail al-Shehri, his elder brother. As his family adhered to Wahhabism, a fundamentalist movement within Islam, al-Shehri grew up in a very conservative household; he was forbidden to indulge in music and did not have any contact with non-mahram females until he was old enough for an arranged marriage. His family also did not have access to satellite television or the Internet.

== Career ==
=== 2000 ===
Waleed al-Shehri left his studies to accompany his brother's leave of absence after his brother complained of a mental symptom that had caused him grief, telling their father that he intended to seek aid from a religious healer in Medina.

The brothers arrived at the Al Farouq training camp in Afghanistan, where they met Ahmed al-Nami and Saeed al-Ghamdi. Before arriving at Al-Farouq, the four reportedly pledged themselves to jihad in Spring of 2000, in a ceremony presided over by Wail al-Shehri, who had dubbed himself Abu Mossaeb al-Janubi after one of Muhammad's companions.

Waleed al-Shehri later served in the security forces at Kandahar International Airport with Saeed al-Ghamdi. After being selected for the operation, he trained with the other hijackers at al-Matar complex under Abu Turab al-Urduni.

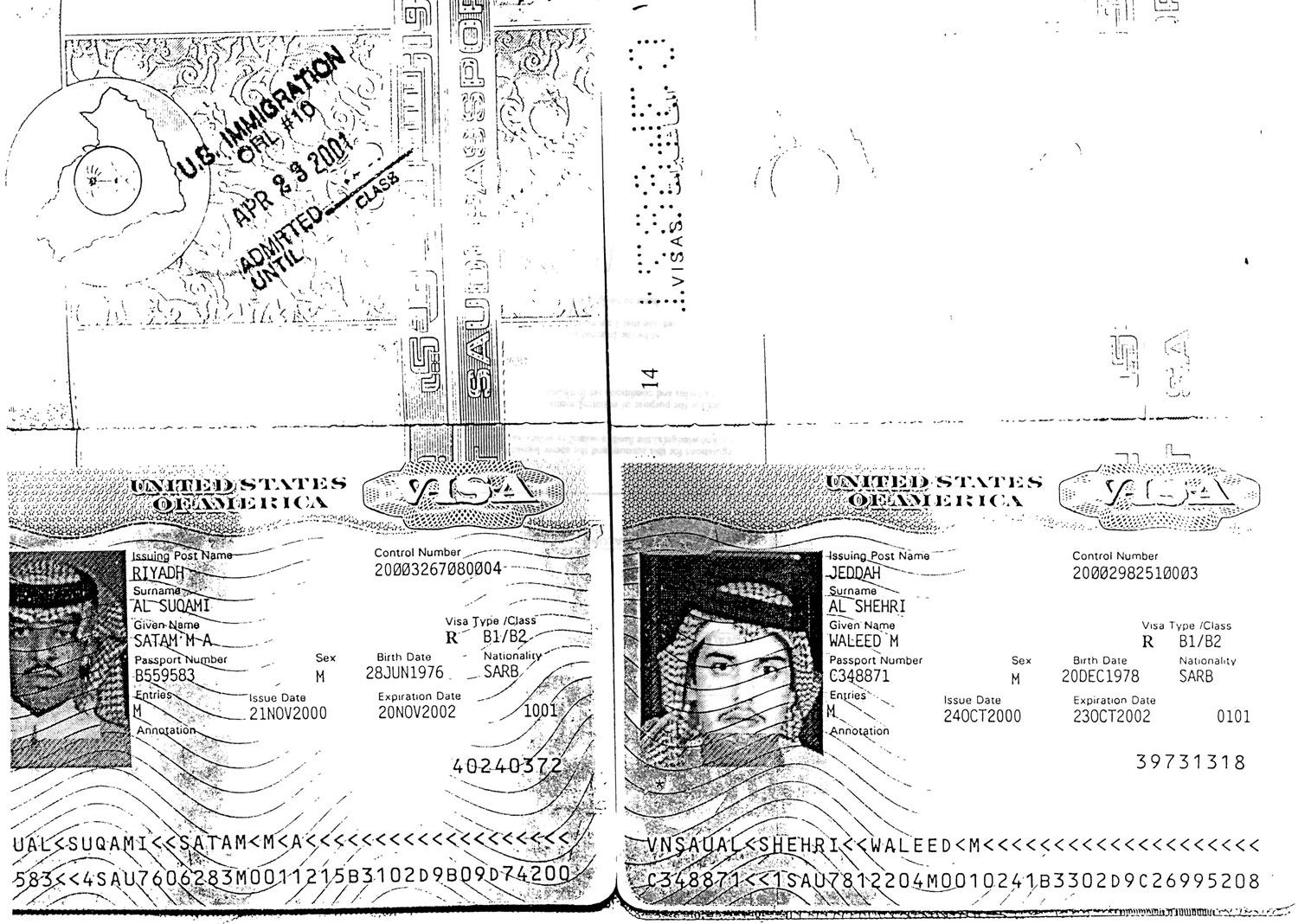
U.S. visas of Satam al-Suqami (left) and Waleed al-Shehri (right)

Al-Shehri returned to Saudi Arabia with his brother in the fall of 2000 so they could obtain clean passports and U.S. visas, which they did on 3 October and 24 October, respectively.

Locals reported that he and his brother disappeared from Khamis Mushayt in the south of Saudi Arabia in December.

In mid-November, the 9/11 Commission believes that three of the future muscle hijackers, Wail al-Shehri, Waleed al-Shehri, and Ahmed al-Nami, all of whom had obtained their U.S. visas in late October, traveled in a group from Saudi Arabia to Beirut, Lebanon and then onward to Iran where they could travel through to Afghanistan without getting their passports stamped. This probably followed their return to Saudi Arabia to get "clean" passports. An associate of a senior Hezbollah operative is thought to have been on the same flight, although this may have been a coincidence.

=== 2001 ===
After training, he would have moved to a safehouse in Karachi, Pakistan before travelling to the United Arab Emirates (UAE). From the UAE, the muscle hijackers came to the U.S. between April and June 2001. Waleed al-Shehri may have arrived in the U.S. on April 23. Some sources report that al-Shehri "at times" stayed at lead hijacker Mohamed Atta's apartment in Hamburg, Germany at some period between 1998 and 2001. Others place him with Zacarias Moussaoui in London.

Ramzi bin al-Shibh says that Osama bin Laden had given a message to Waleed al-Shehri for conveyance to Mohamed Atta earlier that spring, indicating that bin Laden preferred to attack the White House instead of the Capitol.

On May 4, he applied for and received a Florida driver's license. The next day, he filled out a change-of-address form to receive a duplicate license. Five other suspected hijackers also received duplicate Florida licenses in 2001. Some have speculated that this was to allow multiple persons to use the same identity. On May 19, al-Shehri and Satam al-Suqami flew from Fort Lauderdale to Freeport, Bahamas, where they had reservations at the Bahamas Princess Resort where al-Shehri and al-Suqami rented two cars, a black Buick Regal and a gray Ford Taurus. The two were turned away by Bahamian officials on arrival, however, because they lacked visas; they returned to Florida that same day. The 9/11 Commission felt that they likely took this trip to renew al-Suqami's immigration status, as al-Suqami's legal stay in the United States ended on 21 May.

He was one of nine hijackers to open a SunTrust bank account with a cash deposit around June 2001. While living in Boynton, neighbors reported that he seemed to be an enthusiastic fan of the Florida Marlins.

On July 16, both Wail and Waleed were staying at a hotel in Salou, Spain where they were visited by Mohamed Atta. On 30 July, al-Shehri traveled alone from Fort Lauderdale to Boston. He flew to San Francisco the next day, where he stayed one night before returning via Las Vegas.

According to librarian Kathleen Hensmen, Wail and Waleed al-Shehri used the Internet access at Delray Beach Public Library in August, where they may have been looking at information on crop dusting; they reportedly left the library with a third Middle Eastern man thought to be Marwan al-Shehhi, who Hensmen said asked her for the name of a local restaurant.

On September 5, Wail and Waleed al‐Shehri traveled together on Delta Air Lines Flight 2462 from Fort Lauderdale to Boston. They checked in together at the Park Inn Hotel in Chestnut Hill, Massachusetts, staying in room 432. Abdulaziz al-Omari may have also spent a night at the Park Inn before leaving with Mohamed Atta for Portland, Maine on 10 September. When they checked out, the brothers may have left a discarded sheet of instructions on how to fly a transcontinental jetliner in their hotel room.

=== September 11 attacks ===
Waleed al-Shehri, his brother Wail, and Satam al-Suqami arrived together at Logan Airport at 06:45 on the morning of 11 September 2001, having left their Ford Focus rental car in the airport parking facility. Upon check-in, all three were selected by the Computer-Assisted Passenger Prescreening System (CAPPS), which meant that any baggage they checked was subject to extra screening. As the CAPPS was only for luggage, the three hijackers did not undergo any extra scrutiny at the passenger security checkpoint.

By 7:40 a.m., all five hijackers were aboard the flight, which was scheduled to depart at 7:45 a.m. Wail and Waleed al-Shehri sat together in first class in seats 2A and 2B respectively. The aircraft taxied away from Gate 26 and departed Logan International Airport at 7:59 a.m. from runway 4R after a 14-minute delay. The hijacking of Flight 11 began at approximately 08:14, which is when the pilot stopped responding to air traffic control. It is suspected that the brothers stabbed two flight attendants in the hijacking. At 08:46:40, Mohamed Atta deliberately crashed Flight 11 into the northern facade of the North Tower (Tower 1) of the World Trade Center. The damage caused to the North Tower destroyed any means of escape from above the impact zone, trapping 1,344 people. The North Tower collapsed at 10:28, after burning for 102 minutes.

== Aftermath ==
=== Reports after 9/11 attacks ===
On 23 September 2001, BBC News reported that al-Shehri was "alive and well" in Casablanca, Morocco, and was talking to multiple media organizations; however, due to confusion over the man's identity and some editorial concerns over conspiracy theories, BBC News later modified 23 September report by inserting "A man called ... " BBC News considers 23 September report superseded by an 5 October 2001 report that lists Waleed as one of the alleged hijackers believed by the FBI to be responsible for 11 September attacks.

Waleed and Wail were both reported to have been initially found, in error, by a Saudi newspaper editor as the sons of Ahmed Alshehri, a senior Saudi diplomat stationed in Bombay, India. On 16 September 2001, the diplomat Ahmed Alshehri denied that he was the father of the two hijackers. Wail claims he did attend Embry-Riddle Aeronautical University in Daytona Beach, Florida — but was the victim of mistaken identity, since he used that training to secure his current position with a Moroccan airline company. Saudi Arabia has confirmed his story, and suggested he was the victim of identity theft.

Muhammad Ali al-Shehri, the Shehri brothers' true father, was identified prior to 17 September 2001, and told Arab News that he had not heard from his sons in 10 months prior to September 2001. An ABC News story in March 2002 repeated this, and during a report entitled "A Saudi Apology" for Dateline NBC on 25 August 2002, NBC reporter John Hockenberry traveled to 'Asir, where he interviewed the third brother, Salah, who agreed that his two brothers were dead and claimed they had been "brainwashed".

Furthermore, another article explains that the pilot who lives in Casablanca was named Walid al-Shri (not Waleed M. al-Shehri) and that much of the BBC information regarding "alive" hijackers was incorrect according to the same sources used by BBC. In September 2007, a video recording of his last testament was released to mark the 6th anniversary of the attacks.

== See also ==
- Hijackers in the September 11 attacks
- PENTTBOM
