= Saeed al-Ghamdi =

Saudi terrorist and 9/11 hijacker (1979–2001)

- سعيد الغامدي
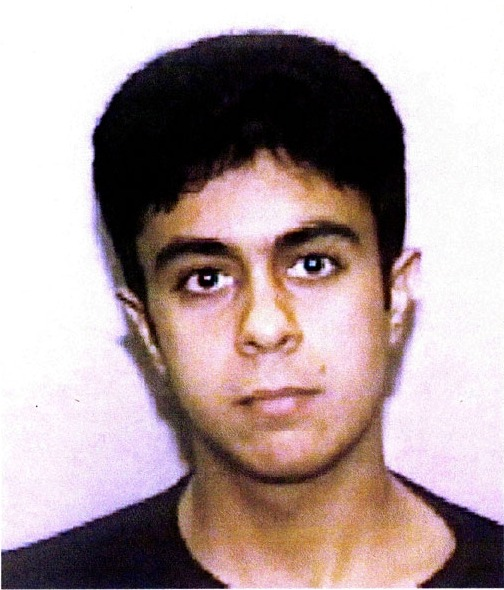
- al-Ghamdi in July 2001
- Born: Saeed Abdullah Ali Sulayman al-Ghamdi; November 21, 1979; Al-Bahah Province, Saudi Arabia
- Died: September 11, 2001 (aged 21); Stonycreek Township, Somerset County, Pennsylvania, U.S.
- Cause of death: Suicide by plane crash (September 11 attacks)
- Known for: Hijacking United Airlines Flight 93 during the September 11 attacks

Saeed Abdullah Ali Sulayman al-Ghamdi (Arabic: سعيد عبد الله علي سليمان الغامدي, romanized: Sa'īd 'Abd Allāh 'Alī Sulaymān al-Ghāmdī; November 21, 1979 – September 11, 2001) was a Saudi terrorist hijacker. He was one of four terrorist hijackers of United Airlines Flight 93 as part of the 11 September attacks. Despite his name, he was not related to the brothers Hamza al-Ghamdi or Ahmed al-Ghamdi who were part of the team that hijacked United Airlines Flight 175.

Born in Saudi Arabia, al-Ghamdi left his home to fight in Chechnya after dropping out of college, but was reported to have diverted to Afghanistan to train in an al-Qaeda camp. It was reported he was chosen by Osama bin Laden to participate in terrorist attacks in the United States and arrived in the U.S. in June 2001. During his stay in the U.S., he quietly settled in Florida, planning out how the attacks would commence and training on flight simulators.

On 11 September 2001, he boarded United 93 and assisted in the hijacking of the plane, which was diverted toward Washington, D.C., under the control of lead hijacker and trained pilot Ziad Jarrah, so that Jarrah could crash the plane into an iconic building, likely the U.S. Capitol or the White House, as part of the coordinated attacks. The plane instead crashed into a field in Somerset County, Pennsylvania, after the passengers attempted to retake control of the plane in an uprising.

== Early life and education ==
Saeed al-Ghamdi was from the al-Bahah Province of Saudi Arabia, and shared the same tribal affiliation with fellow hijackers Ahmed al-Ghamdi, Hamza al-Ghamdi, and Ahmed al-Haznawi, although he was not related to either al-Ghamdi. He may have been in contact with the two al-Ghamdis and al-Haznawi as early as 1999. This group is noted as being some of the more religiously observant of the hijackers. Al-Ghamdi spent time in al Qasim province, Saudi Arabia where he transferred to college but soon dropped out and ceased contact with his family. While there he probably associated with the radical Saudi cleric named Sulayman al-Alwan as several other future hijackers had.

Al-Ghamdi later headed to Chechnya to participate in the conflict against the Russians. At this time, Chechen fighters were turning away additional foreigners, many of whom ended up in al-Qaeda camps in Afghanistan to train and await entry to Chechnya. Saeed ended up at the Al Farouq training camp, where he met Ahmed al-Nami, and the brothers Wail and Waleed al-Shehri. The four reportedly pledged themselves to jihad in the Spring of 2000, in a ceremony presided over by Wail al-Shehri—who had dubbed himself Abu Mossaeb al-Janubi after one of the Islamic prophet Muhammad's companions.

Al-Ghamdi was known to Tawfiq bin Attash who is thought to have convinced him to become a martyr. Al-Ghamdi was at that time working as a security guard at Kandahar airport along with Waleed al-Shehri.

Some time late in 2000, al-Ghamdi traveled to the United Arab Emirates, where he purchased traveller's cheques presumed to have been paid for by Mustafa al-Hawsawi. Five other hijackers also passed through the UAE and purchased travellers cheques, including Majed Moqed, Wail al-Shehri, Hamza al-Ghamdi, Ahmed al-Haznawi, and Ahmed al-Nami.

On 13 November 2000, another Saeed al-Ghamdi tried to obtain a visa to enter the United States, but was declined. Although the 9/11 Commission makes mention of him, there is no evidence he was associated with the hijackers.

In March 2001, al-Ghamdi was filmed in a farewell video that was later aired on al-Jazeera. In the video, many future 9/11 hijackers swear to become martyrs, although no details of the plot are revealed. al-Ghamdi referred to America as "the enemy", and is seen studying maps and flight manuals.

== In the United States ==
On 12 June 2001, Saeed al-Ghamdi applied for and received a second two-year US B-1/B-2 (tourist/business) visa in Jeddah, Saudi Arabia. His application was submitted by a local travel agency and processed through Visa Express, a controversial US visa program in Saudi Arabia which was discontinued the following year.

Arriving in the U.S. on 27 June 2001, with Fayez Banihammad, Saeed shared an apartment with Ahmed al-Nami in Delray Beach, Florida. Oddly, he listed the Naval Air Station in Pensacola, Florida, as his permanent address on his driver's license. He was one of 9 hijackers to open a SunTrust bank account with a cash deposit around June 2001.

According to al-Jazeera reporter Yosri Fouda's documentary Top Secret: The Road to September 11, three weeks prior to the attacks, Saeed is believed to have used the name 'Abdul Rahman' to send a message to Ramzi bin al-Shibh (who was posing as a girlfriend) online, in which he wrote

The first semester commences in three weeks. Two high schools and two universities. ... This summer will surely be hot ...19 certificates for private education and four exams. Regards to the professor. Goodbye. (Note: This was said to be a reference to two military/governmental targets and two civilian, nineteen hijackers, four planes.)

— Saeed al-Ghamdi, August 2001.

On 7 September, all four Flight 93 hijackers flew from Fort Lauderdale to Newark International Airport aboard Spirit Airlines.

== Attacks ==
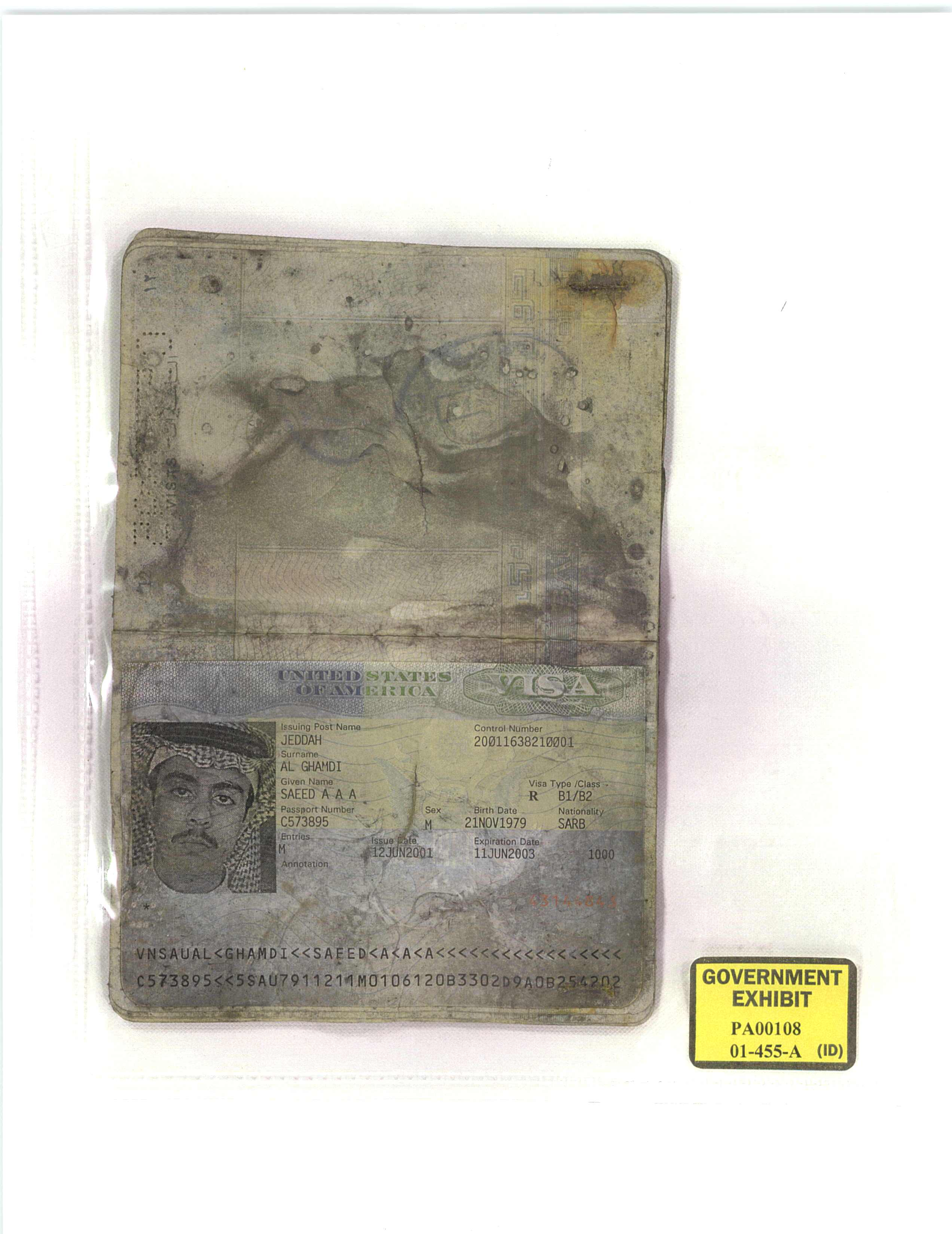
Visa page from Saeed al-Ghamdi's Kingdom of Saudi Arabia passport recovered from the United Airlines Flight 93 crash site

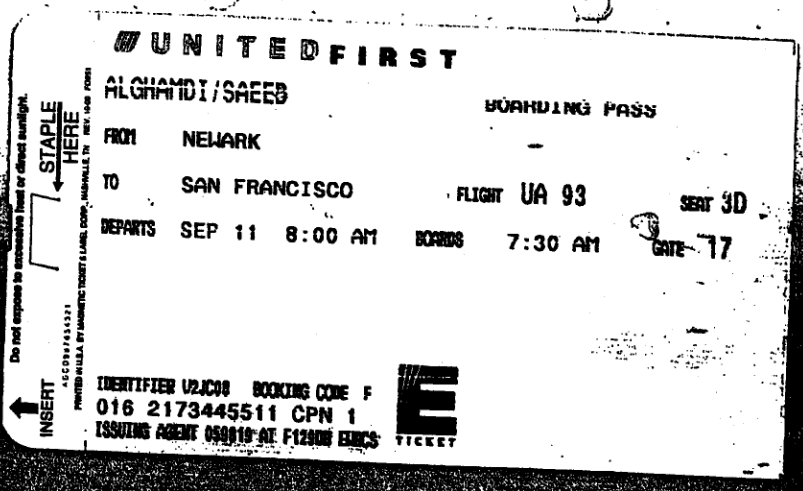
Saeed al-Ghamdi's boarding pass for Flight 93

On the morning of 11 September 2001, al-Ghamdi boarded United Airlines Flight 93 without incident. Due to the flight's delay, the pilot and crew were notified of the previous hijackings that day, and were told to be on the alert. Within minutes, Flight 93 was hijacked as well.

At least two of the cell phone calls made by passengers indicate that the hijackers were wearing red bandanas. The calls also indicated that one had tied a box around his torso, and claimed there was a bomb inside.

The flight transcript suggests that two hijackers were in the cockpit. Ziad Jarrah was identified as the pilot and is heard calling the other hijacker "Saeed", indicating that al-Ghamdi, who also trained in flight simulators, was helping Jarrah with the controls. Jarrah asked, "Is that it? Shall we finish it off?" Al-Ghamdi responded, "No! Not yet. When they all come, we finish it off."

Passengers on the plane heard through phone calls the fates of the other hijacked planes. A passenger uprising resulted in the plane crashing into a field near Shanksville, Pennsylvania, killing everyone aboard.

== Mistaken identity allegations ==
On 23 September 2001, before the FBI had released the pictures of the hijackers, the BBC and The Daily Telegraph reported that a Saudi Airlines pilot named Saeed al-Ghamdi was furious that a name on the hijacker's list released by the FBI matched his own. CNN also showed a picture of the "living" al-Ghamdi as the hijacker. The man claimed CNN likely got his picture from a Flight Safety flying school in Florida he attended. Der Spiegel later investigated the claims of "living" hijackers by the BBC and discovered them to be cases of mistaken identity.

In June 2005 the Saudi government released a list (see al-Qaeda in the Arabian Peninsula) of 36 wanted (and alive) terrorists, one of whom was Salih Saeed Al Batih al-Ghamdi. 9/11 conspiracy theorists quickly confused him with the hijacker Saeed al-Ghamdi.

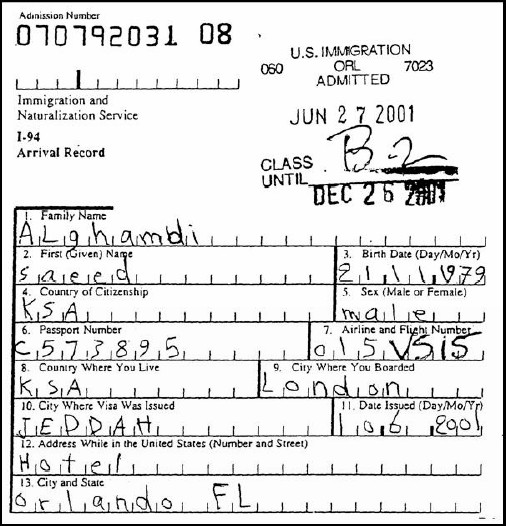
Saeed's I-94 form

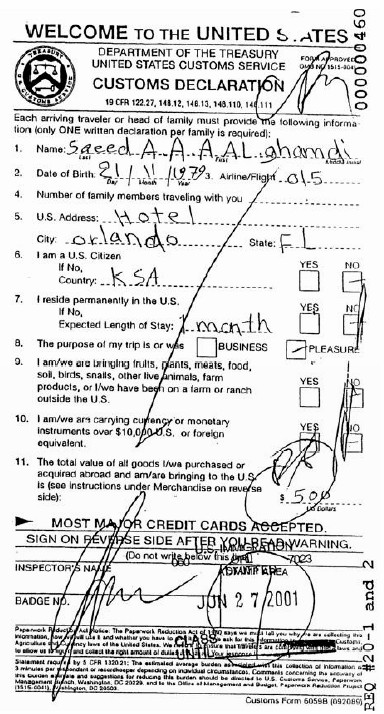
Saeed's Customs declaration

== In popular culture ==
- He has been portrayed by Indian actor Ankur Bhatt in the 2005 television film The Flight That Fought Back, Iraqi actor Lewis Alsamari in United 93, and Canadian actor Shawn Ahmed in Flight 93.

== See also ==
- PENTTBOM
- Hijackers in the 11 September attacks
