= Rudi Dekkers =

Dutch businessman and drug trafficker

- Born: July 27, 1956; Apeldoorn, Gelderland, Netherlands
- Died: April 11, 2024 (aged 67); The Philippines

Rudi Dekkers (July 27, 1956 – April 11, 2024) was a Dutch businessman and convicted drug trafficker. Dekkers was the former owner of Huffman Aviation, a flight school in Venice, Florida. He and the school became the subject of worldwide attention after the September 11 attacks when it was revealed that the school had trained two of the hijackers—Mohamed Atta and Marwan al-Shehhi—who crashed American Airlines Flight 11 and United Airlines Flight 175, respectively, into the Twin Towers of the World Trade Center.

== Early life and career ==
Dekkers was born on July 27, 1956, in Apeldoorn, Netherlands. He grew up in the Jordaan neighborhood of Amsterdam. Dekkers grew up poor in an abusive home where his father would routinely punish him. He would often run away from home at the age of eight wandering through the streets of Amsterdam.

=== Career ===
He worked as a housing broker in Ede selling three to four houses a week. In 1983, he met Bill Gates at a computer conference and became inspired to set up a computer business in the Netherlands via Miami, bypassing tax authorities, and becoming one of the first computer dealers in the Netherlands. In between working as a broker and the computer business, he obtained his pilot's license at Teuge Airport.

Dekkers moved to Florida in 1993, following a conviction of tax fraud that was later acquitted on appeal, and difficulties with former business partners and staff. Former business partners accused him of defrauding them of tens of thousands of guilder. He also faced sexual harassment allegations from a former female employee, a case that was later settled.

By 2001, before the attacks, Dekkers estimated that he was worth $12 million. He owned a Dodge Viper sports car and helicopter, and he had a landing pad in front of his Naples, Florida, home.

== September 11 attacks ==
Dekkers purchased Huffman Aviation in 1999. At the time of purchase, the school had a fleet of 12 small aircraft. Huffman offered private pilot, instrument rating, commercial pilot licence, multi-engine ratings, and flight instructor training, but he did not offer training on larger jet aircraft.

Atta and al-Shehhi had attended the school to learn how to fly small aircraft. The two first trained at Huffman in July 2000 after they first met with Dekkers while he was on a coffee break in his office at the school. In August, the school filed the M-1 student visa request forms for Atta and al-Shehhi to switch from tourist visas to student visas in order to allow them to enroll in the school's professional pilot program that would last from September 1, 2000, until September 1, 2001. The student visa requests were granted on July 17, 2001, for Atta, and August 9, 2001, for al-Shehhi. For a short while, during their time at the school, both Atta and al-Shehhi lived with a company employee named Charlie Voss.

Following the attacks, media reports and the investigation into the attacks led the FBI to Huffman Aviation. The FBI seized records from the flight school which revealed that both Atta and al-Shehhi paid $10,000 for two months of flight instruction. Dekkers cooperated with the FBI from the start with former FBI investigator Kerry Myers saying that "Rudi was very cooperative. He didn't require a subpoena, he didn't require a court order. He was a good American citizen." Meyers stated that evidence linking Ramzi bin al-Shibh, described as one of the people to be the possible 20th hijacker, to the attacks came from Dekkers's cooperation and records found from both hijackers. Dekkers also maintained that he did not feel guilty and had made copies of their passports and their visas and that there were no red flags, asserting "Nothing was out of the ordinary. We did our job."

After the attacks, Dekkers went bankrupt, lost his business and house, crashed a helicopter, and got divorced, losing custody of his daughters. He received death threats and also had trouble with the Internal Revenue Service, lenders, and the Federal Aviation Administration.

In January 2002, Huffman Aviation again made headlines when the local paper sent a reporter onto its property, who managed to casually move between airplane cockpits, fuel tanks, and other "safety concerns" without anybody noticing or stopping him. In March, the school was cited for having left fuel trucks unlocked, with keys in the ignition, at the Venice Municipal Airport.

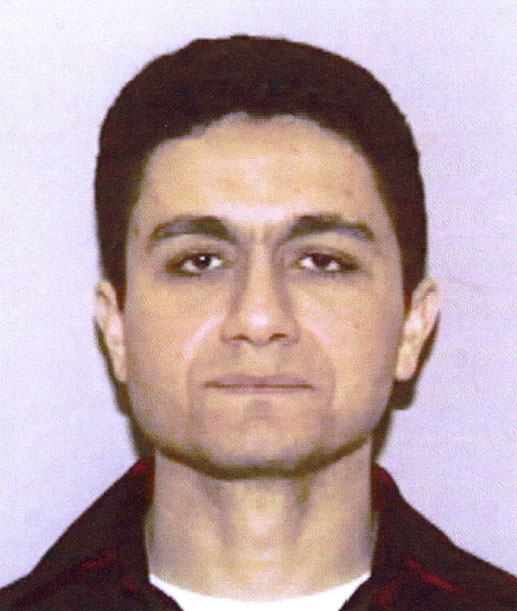
Mohamed Atta

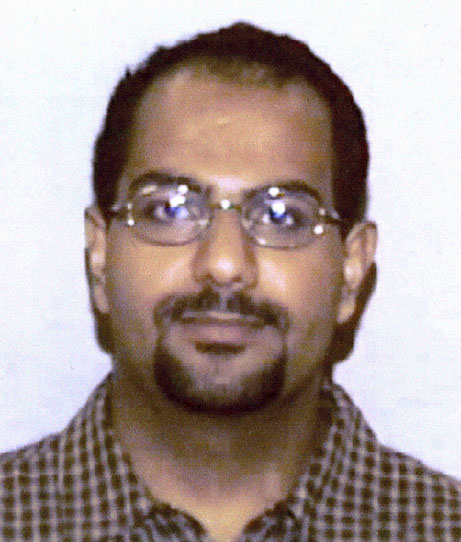
Marwan al-Shehhi

On February 24, 2002, a helicopter that Dekkers was piloting crashed into the Caloosahatchee River. Dekkers suspected that someone had tried to have him killed after discovering that the helicopter's fuel lines had been cut.

Since media attention focused on him, Dekkers enjoyed his time in the spotlight saying "The camera loves me." He had been criticized for his alleged lack of oversight at the school. He countered that the United States' national border security and visa systems were lax which would be confirmed when he found two approved visa applications from the U.S. Immigration and Naturalization Service for Atta and al-Shehhi in March 2002. After the attacks, he wound up losing $400,000, and most of his students who were primarily international later dropped out. A second school he operated in Naples, Florida, was closed after he was sued by a former business partner after defaulting on a series of loans, one of which accounted for $1.7 million.

Dekkers sold Huffman Aviation in 2003.

Dekkers stated in 2011 that the two men "never displayed any behaviors that would have labeled them as terrorists." And at one point during their training, "the two men were on the verge of being kicked out of the school because they did not appear to be taking their training seriously and were too busy fooling around and not listening to their instructors. They had to be warned, and went on to become average students." He would get along with al-Shehhi describing him as "a more likable person. He laughed and joked." However, Dekkers and his employees described Atta as "dead man walking" due to his "white face and no emotions and was a nasty person, very unfriendly." Dekkers stated that he did not know what they were going to do and maintained his innocence, "I don't feel guilty at all. I couldn't do nothing about it. I wish I could be a hero. I think about this often. Why me? But that's fate. You can't turn away from fate, I guess."

Dekkers stated in 2016 that his personal "9/11" began on September 12, when the FBI appeared at his business. "For me, it's not an anniversary. I live 9/11 every day."

== Later life and death ==
In 2007, Dekkers made a comfortable living selling swimming pools in Fort Myers, Florida, living in a villa in a gated community. He was remarried to a Cuban woman, who was pregnant with their child. The 2008 financial crisis resulted in the Great Recession, causing the Florida housing market to collapse, and he lost his business. He then ran a cell phone store in Naples.

By 2011, Dekkers was divorced again and in severe financial shape, with no job and facing imminent eviction from his house, which had been reclaimed by the bank. He lived on food stamps, only ate once a day, and illegally tapped electricity. He was chased by bailiffs who wanted to confiscate his car, and his U.S. visa had expired, meaning he was in the country illegally. In 2011, Dekkers published an autobiography, Guilty by Association, detailing his life, passion for flying, and his interactions with Atta and al-Shehhi.

Dekkers praised the killing of Osama bin Laden, "Like a lot of people, I wish I was the one. And bravo to everyone who was behind this. The head of the snake is gone."

On December 2, 2012, Dekkers was arrested on federal drug charges by the United States Department of Homeland Security in Houston after accepting a blue suitcase containing 18.7 kilograms of cocaine and 860 grams of heroin. He was sentenced to five years in prison after a year and a half in pre-trial detention. He was reportedly hospitalised after an assault by Mexican gang members.

Following his release from federal custody, Dekkers moved to the Dominican Republic.

On April 11, 2019, Dutch authorities arrested Dekkers at Amsterdam Airport Schiphol with 118 swallowed scoops of cocaine. He was sentenced to seven months in prison, two of which were suspended but fled during a furlough abroad. He returned to the country in June 2022 and was ordered by a court to serve the two months probation for cocaine smuggling, plus a month that he had not served due to his flight.

Dekkers was the subject of a 2021 three-part Dutch television documentary, Rudi - Achtervolgd door 9/11 (Rudi - Haunted by 9/11).

In 2022, Dekkers lived in Medellín, Colombia, with his girlfriend Alexandra. Later, he moved to the Philippines where he died from heart failure on April 11, 2024.
