= Iván Chirivella =

Spanish pilot and former tennis player (born 1976)

Iván Chirivella Cruz (born 1976, Gran Canaria, Spain) is a Spanish commercial airline pilot, tennis player, and author. He gained international attention as a flight instructor who trained two of the September 11 hijackers, Mohamed Atta and Marwan al-Shehhi, while working at a flight school in Florida. Chirivella has described himself as an "innocent accomplice" (Cómplice inocente), also the title of his 2003 memoir.

== Early life ==
Chirivella was born on the island of Gran Canaria in 1976. At the age of 12, he moved with his family to the United States, pursuing a career as an elite tennis player. He trained and competed during his teenage years but later transitioned to aviation after completing his studies.

== Aviation career ==
Chirivella trained as a professional pilot and later became a flight instructor at Jones Aviation Academy in Sarasota, Florida. Among his students were Mohamed Atta and Marwan al-Shehhi, who later carried out the September 11 attacks. In interviews, Chirivella described them as "very religious" but noted that they never said anything bad about the United States. He recalled flying with them six days a week, up to four hours a day. In his book Cómplice inocente (“Innocent Accomplice”) he describes that Atta was only interested in large aircraft such as Boeing planes ("solo se interesaban por los aviones grandes, los Boeing").

On the night of the attacks, Chirivella reportedly had a premonitory nightmare about the event. He immediately connected the tragedy to his former students, whom he had expelled from the academy a year earlier. Within hours of the attacks, his name was widely reported in the media as the instructor of two of the suicide pilots. He was investigated by the FBI but was not charged. Due to visa issues and the refusal of U.S. authorities to renew his residency, he returned to Spain in March 2002.

After returning to Spain, Chirivella joined Vueling in 2006, where he became a senior captain. As of 2025, he has accumulated more than 12,500 flight hours and operates routes connecting over 30 countries.

== Book: Cómplice inocente ==
In 2003, Chirivella co‑authored Cómplice inocente: Diario del piloto español que enseñó a volar a los terroristas del 11 de septiembre ("Innocent Accomplice: Diary of the Spanish Pilot Who Taught the 9/11 Terrorists to Fly") with journalist Alicia Rodríguez Mederos. The book details his experiences training Atta and al‑Shehhi and his subsequent FBI investigation. All proceeds were donated to the Asociación Víctimas del Terrorismo (Association of Victims of Terrorism).

== 2025 Vueling incident ==
On 24 July 2025, Chirivella was captain of Vueling flight VY**** from Valencia to Paris when approximately 50 Jewish teenagers and their camp director were removed from the aircraft by Spain's Guardia Civil. Israeli Minister for Diaspora Affairs and Combating Antisemitism Amichai Chikli described the removal as a "serious antisemitic incident," while Vueling stated that the group had "mishandled passenger safety equipment" and displayed "highly combative" behavior that threatened flight safety. Videos of the removal went viral online, and an investigation by Spanish authorities remains ongoing.

== Publications ==
- Iván Chirivella, Alicia Rodríguez Mederos: Cómplice inocente: Diario del piloto español que enseñó a volar a los terroristas del 11 de septiembre. Martínez Roca, Barcelona 2003, ISBN 978-84-270-2993-4.
