= Al-Hazmi =

al-Hazmi (Arabic: الحازمي, al-Ḥāzmī) is an Arabic family name.

== People ==
- Nawaf al-Hazmi (1976–2001), Saudi hijacker of American Airlines Flight 77
- Salem al-Hazmi (1981–2001), Saudi hijacker of American Airlines Flight 77
