= VNC (disambiguation) =

Virtual Network Computing is a graphical desktop-sharing system used to remotely control another computer.

VNC may also refer to:

- Vehicular Networking Conference, of the IEEE Communications Society
- Ventral nerve cord
- Venice Municipal Airport (IATA airport code: VNC), Venice, Sarasota County, Florida, United States
- Van Nuys station (rail station code: VNC), Van Nuys, Los Angeles, California, United States
