= Hijackers in the September 11 attacks =

Lead hijackers in the September 11 attacks

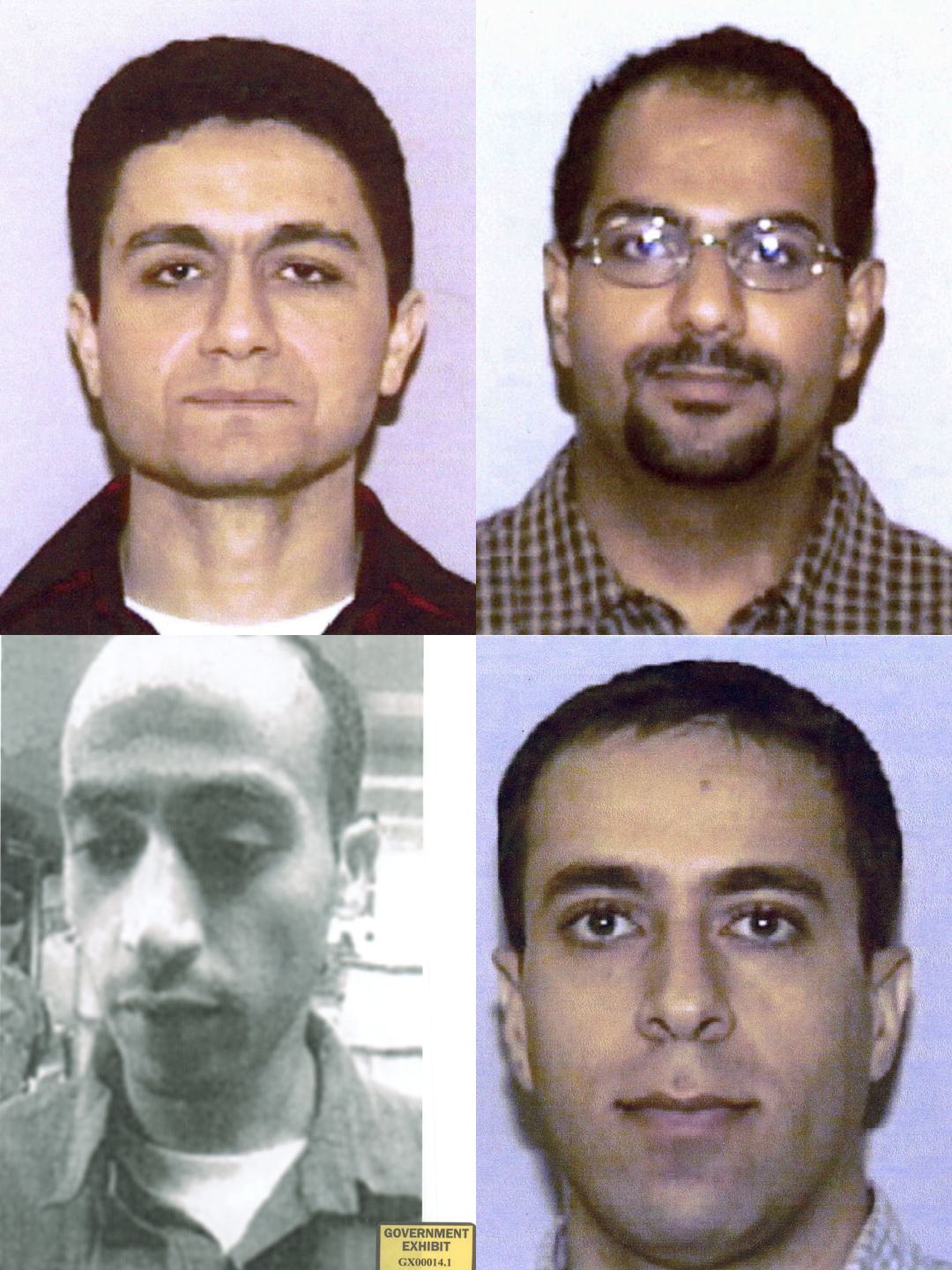
In order, left to right, top to bottom:
- Mohamed Atta (American Airlines Flight 11)
- Marwan al-Shehhi (United Airlines Flight 175)
- Hani Hanjour (American Airlines Flight 77)
- Ziad Jarrah (United Airlines Flight 93)

The aircraft hijackers in the September 11 attacks were 19 men affiliated with al-Qaeda, a jihadist organization based in the Islamic Emirate of Afghanistan. They hailed from four countries: 15 of them were citizens of Saudi Arabia, two were from the United Arab Emirates, one was from Egypt, and one from Lebanon. To carry the attacks out, the hijackers were organized into four teams, each led by a pilot-trained hijacker who would commandeer the flight with three or four "muscle hijackers" who were trained to help subdue the pilots, passengers, and crew. Each team was assigned to a different flight and given a unique target to crash their respective planes into. Mohamed Atta was the assigned ringleader over all four groups.

The first hijackers to arrive in the United States were Khalid al-Mihdhar and Nawaf al-Hazmi, who settled in San Diego County, California, in January 2000. They were followed by three hijacker-pilots, Hamburg cell members Mohamed Atta, Marwan al-Shehhi, and Ziad Jarrah in mid-2000 to undertake flight training at Huffman Aviation flight-training school in Venice, Florida. The fourth hijacker-pilot, Hani Hanjour, who was not a member of the Hamburg cell, arrived in San Diego in December 2000. The rest of the "muscle hijackers" arrived in early- and mid-2001.

== Selection ==
Khalid al-Mihdhar and Nawaf al-Hazmi were both experienced and respected jihadists in the eyes of al-Qaeda's leader Osama bin Laden.

As for the pilots who would go on to participate in the attacks, three of them were original members of the Hamburg cell (Mohamed Atta, Marwan al-Shehhi, and Ziad Jarrah). Following their training at al-Qaeda training camps in Afghanistan, they were chosen by bin Laden and al-Qaeda's military wing due to their extensive knowledge of Western culture and language skills, increasing the mission's operational security and its chances for success. Mohamed Atta himself was immediately given command over the planning and execution of the attack upon his arrival in Afghanistan in January 2000. The fourth intended pilot, Ramzi bin al-Shibh, a member of the Hamburg cell, was also chosen to participate in the attacks, but he was unable to obtain a visa for entry into the United States. He was later replaced by Hani Hanjour, a Saudi national.

Al-Mihdhar and al-Hazmi were also potential pilot hijackers but did not do well in their initial pilot lessons in San Diego. Both were kept on as "muscle" hijackers, who would help overpower the passengers and crew and allow the pilot hijackers to take control of the flights. In addition to al-Mihdhar and al-Hazmi, 13 other muscle hijackers were selected in late 2000 or early 2001. All were from Saudi Arabia, with the exception of Fayez Banihammad, who was from the United Arab Emirates.

Shortly after the attacks the FBI concluded that the majority of the "muscle" hijackers did not know that they were on a suicide mission, as unlike the pilots they had not prepared last wills and testaments or given other indications that they expected their lives to end. According to an audio recording of Osama bin Laden from 2001, the "muscle" hijackers were not in contact with the pilot hijackers and were not told the true nature of their mission until the day of the attacks.

=== Hijackers ===
Flight	Name	Image	Age	Nationality
American Airlines Flight 11 (Target: North Tower)	Mohamed Atta (leader)		33	Egypt
American Airlines Flight 11 (Target: North Tower)	Abdulaziz al-Omari		22	Saudi Arabia
American Airlines Flight 11 (Target: North Tower)	Wail al-Shehri		28	Saudi Arabia
American Airlines Flight 11 (Target: North Tower)	Waleed al-Shehri		22	Saudi Arabia
American Airlines Flight 11 (Target: North Tower)	Satam al-Suqami		25	Saudi Arabia
United Airlines Flight 175 (Target: South Tower)	Marwan al-Shehhi (leader)		23	United Arab Emirates
United Airlines Flight 175 (Target: South Tower)	Fayez Banihammad		24	United Arab Emirates
United Airlines Flight 175 (Target: South Tower)	Mohand al-Shehri		22	Saudi Arabia
United Airlines Flight 175 (Target: South Tower)	Hamza al-Ghamdi		20	Saudi Arabia
United Airlines Flight 175 (Target: South Tower)	Ahmed al-Ghamdi		22	Saudi Arabia
American Airlines Flight 77 (Target: The Pentagon)	Hani Hanjour (leader)		29	Saudi Arabia
American Airlines Flight 77 (Target: The Pentagon)	Khalid al-Mihdhar		26	Saudi Arabia
American Airlines Flight 77 (Target: The Pentagon)	Majed Moqed	100px120px	24	Saudi Arabia
American Airlines Flight 77 (Target: The Pentagon)	Nawaf al-Hazmi		25	Saudi Arabia
American Airlines Flight 77 (Target: The Pentagon)	Salem al-Hazmi		20	Saudi Arabia
United Airlines Flight 93 (Target: Unknown, possibly in Washington, D.C.) (Note: The hijackers' plan was intended to target the U.S. Capitol Building.)	Ziad Jarrah (leader)		26	Lebanon
United Airlines Flight 93 (Target: Unknown, possibly in Washington, D.C.)	Ahmed al-Haznawi		20	Saudi Arabia
United Airlines Flight 93 (Target: Unknown, possibly in Washington, D.C.)	Ahmed al-Nami		23	Saudi Arabia
United Airlines Flight 93 (Target: Unknown, possibly in Washington, D.C.)	Saeed al-Ghamdi		21	Saudi Arabia

== Hijacked aircraft ==
=== American Airlines Flight 11: One World Trade Center (North Tower) ===
N.B.: Bold text notes the hijackers who piloted the planes.

Hijackers: Mohamed Atta (Egyptian), Abdulaziz al-Omari (Saudi Arabian), Wail al-Shehri (Saudi Arabian), Waleed al-Shehri (Saudi Arabian), Satam al-Suqami (Saudi Arabian).

Two flight attendants called the American Airlines reservation desk during the hijacking. Betty Ong reported that "the five hijackers had come from first-class seats: 2A, 2B, 9A, 9C and 9B." Flight attendant Amy Sweeney called a flight services manager at Logan Airport in Boston and described them as Middle Eastern. She gave the staff the seat numbers and they pulled up the ticket and credit card information of the hijackers, identifying Mohamed Atta.

Mohamed Atta at 08:23
Mohamed Atta's first announcement, heard by ATC at 08:23.

Mohamed Atta at 08:33
Mohamed Atta's second announcement, heard by ATC at 08:33.

Mohamed Atta's voice was heard over the air traffic control system, broadcasting messages thought to be intended for the passengers.

"Buddy, We have some planes. Just stay quiet and you'll be okay. We are returning to the airport."

"Nobody move. Everything will be okay. If you try to make any moves, you'll endanger yourself and the airplane. Just stay quiet."

"Nobody move, please. We are going back to the airport. Don't try to make any stupid moves."

=== United Airlines Flight 175: Two World Trade Center (South Tower) ===
Hijackers: Marwan al-Shehhi (Emirati), Fayez Banihammad (Emirati), Ahmed al-Ghamdi (Saudi Arabian), Hamza al-Ghamdi (Saudi Arabian), Mohand al-Shehri (Saudi Arabian).

A United Airlines mechanic was called by a flight attendant who stated the pilots had been murdered and the plane hijacked.

=== American Airlines Flight 77: Pentagon ===
Hijackers: Hani Hanjour (Saudi Arabian), Nawaf al-Hazmi (Saudi Arabian), Salem al-Hazmi (Saudi Arabian), Khalid al-Mihdhar (Saudi Arabian), Majed Moqed (Saudi Arabian).

Two hijackers, Hani Hanjour and Majed Moqed, were identified by clerks as having bought single, first-class tickets for Flight 77 from Advance Travel Service in Totowa, New Jersey with $1,842.25 in cash.

Renee May, a flight attendant on Flight 77, used a cell phone to call her mother in Las Vegas. She said her flight was being hijacked by six individuals who had moved them to the rear of the plane. Unlike the other flights, there was no report of stabbings or bomb threats. According to the 9/11 Commission Report, it is possible that pilots were not stabbed to death and were sent to the rear of the plane. One of the hijackers, most likely Hanjour, announced on the intercom that the flight had been hijacked. Passenger Barbara Olson called her husband, Theodore Olson, the Solicitor General of the United States, stating the flight had been hijacked and the hijackers had knives and box cutters.

Two of the hijackers had been on the FBI's watch list: Khalid al-Mihdhar and Nawaf al-Hazmi. Al-Mihdhar and Nawaf al-Hazmi flew to Los Angeles in January 2000 and later took flying lessons in San Diego, during which time they were allegedly assisted by Omar al-Bayoumi and Saudi diplomats Fahad al-Thumairy and Mussaed Ahmed al-Jarrah.

=== United Airlines Flight 93: Shanksville, Pennsylvania ===
"Mayday – 09:28:17"
First mayday call by First Officer Leroy Homer at 09:28:17.

Mayday – 09:28:50
Second mayday call by First Officer Leroy Homer at 09:28:50.

Attempts to communicate with Flight 93 – after 9:28 am

Jarrah – 09:31:57
First announcement made by Ziad Jarrah, heard by ATC at 09:31.

Jarrah – 09:39:11
Second announcement made by Ziad Jarrah, heard by ATC at 09:39.

Hijackers: Ziad Jarrah (Lebanese), Saeed al-Ghamdi (Saudi Arabian), Ahmed al-Haznawi (Saudi Arabian), Ahmed al-Nami (Saudi Arabian).

Passenger Jeremy Glick stated that the hijackers were Arabic-looking, wearing red headbands, and carrying knives.

Spoken messages (from Jarrah) intended for passengers were mistakenly broadcast over the air traffic control system.

"Ladies and gentlemen, this is the captain. Please sit down. Keep remaining sitting [sic]. We have a bomb on board. So sit."

[...]

"Hi, this is the captain. I would like to order you to remain seated. There is a bomb on board and are going back to the airport and to have our demands met. Please remain quiet."

Jarrah is also heard on the cockpit voice recorder. In addition, DNA samples submitted by his girlfriend were matched to remains recovered near Shanksville.

== Investigation ==
=== Before the attacks ===
'[W]e've got to tell the Bureau about this. These guys clearly are bad. One of them, at least, has a multiple-entry visa to the U.S. We've got to tell the FBI.' And then [the CIA officer] said to me, 'No, it's not the FBI's case, not the FBI's jurisdiction.'

— Mark Rossini, "The Spy Factory"

Before the attacks, FBI agent Robert Wright Jr. had written vigorous criticisms of the FBI's alleged incompetence in investigating suspected extremists residing within the United States. Wright was part of the Bureau's Chicago counter-terrorism task force and involved in project Vulgar Betrayal, which was linked to Yasin al-Qadi.

According to James Bamford, the NSA had picked up communications of al-Mihdhar and al-Hazmi back in 1999, but had been hampered by internal bureaucratic conflicts between itself and the CIA, and did not do a full analysis of the information it passed on to the agency. For example, it only passed on the first names, Nawaf and Khalid.

Bamford also claims that the CIA's Alec Station (a unit assigned to bin Laden) knew that al-Mihdhar was planning to come to New York as far back as January 2000. Doug Miller, one of three FBI agents working inside the CIA station, tried to send a message (a CIR) to the FBI to alert them about this, so they could put al-Mihdhar on a watch list. His CIA boss, Tom Wilshire, deputy station chief, allegedly denied permission to Miller. Miller asked his associate Mark Rossini for advice; Rossini pressed Wilshire's deputy but was rebuffed also.

Bamford also claims that al-Mihdhar and al-Hazmi wound up living with Abdussattar Shaikh for a time to save money. Shaikh was, coincidentally, an FBI informant, but since they never acted suspiciously around him, he never reported them. The CIA Bangkok station told Alec Station that al-Hazmi had gone to Los Angeles. None of this information made it back to the FBI headquarters.

On August 23, 2001, less than three weeks before the attacks, the Mossad gave the American government the names of 19 residents suspected of intending to perpetrate an attack against the United States. Among the names were those of Mohamed Atta, Marwan al-Shehhi, Khalid al-Mihdhar, and Nawaf al-Hazmi. It is not known if the list contained all the names of the hijackers or if the list length itself were a coincidence; only those four have been made known.

=== Attacks ===
Within minutes of the attacks, the Federal Bureau of Investigation opened the largest FBI investigation in United States history, operation PENTTBOM. The suspects were identified within 72 hours because few made any attempt to disguise their names on flight and credit card records. They were also among the few non-US citizens and nearly the only passengers with Arabic names on their flights, enabling the FBI to identify them using such details as dates of birth, known or possible residences, visa status, and specific identification of the suspected pilots. On September 14, three days after the attacks, the FBI announced the names of 19 hijackers, and on September 27, they released photos of the hijackers, along with information about their possible nationalities and aliases. Fifteen of the suspected hijackers hailed from Saudi Arabia, two from the United Arab Emirates, and one each from Lebanon and Egypt.

The passport of Satam al-Suqami was reportedly recovered "a few blocks from where the World Trade Center's twin towers once stood"; a passerby picked it up and gave it to an NYPD detective shortly before the towers collapsed. The passports of two other hijackers, Ziad Jarrah and Saeed al-Ghamdi, were recovered from the crash site of United Airlines Flight 93 in Pennsylvania, and a fourth passport, that of Abdulaziz al-Omari, was recovered from luggage that did not make it onto American Airlines Flight 11.

According to the 9/11 Commission Report, 26 al-Qaeda conspirators sought to enter the United States to carry out a suicide mission. In the end, the FBI reported that there were 19 hijackers in all: five on three of the flights, and four on the fourth. After a controversy about an earlier remark, U.S. Homeland Security Secretary Janet Napolitano stated in May 2009 that the 9/11 Commission found that none of the hijackers entered the United States through Canada.

Nawaf al-Hazmi and Hani Hanjour attended the Dar al-Hijrah Falls Church, Virginia, Islamic Center, where the Imam Anwar al-Awlaki preached, in early April 2001. Through interviews with the FBI, it was discovered that al-Awlaki had previously met Nawaf al-Hazmi several times while the two lived in San Diego. At the time, al-Hazmi was living with al-Mihdhar. The hijackers of the same plane often had very strong ties as many of them attended school together or lived together prior to the attacks.

=== Recovery of the hijackers' remains ===
After the 9/11 attacks, remains of the victims and attackers were recovered from the World Trade Center site, from the Pentagon, and in Shanksville, Pennsylvania.

In New York, the remains of two hijackers, potentially from Flight 11, were identified and removed from Memorial Park in Manhattan and turned over to the FBI as evidence. The remains of the other hijackers on Flight 11 and Flight 175 have not been identified and are stored with other unidentified remains at this park.

The remains of the five hijackers on Flight 77 were identified through a process of elimination by October 2, 2001, and were turned over to the FBI as evidence.

For Flight 93, the remains of Ziad Jarrah were identified and turned over to the FBI as evidence after DNA samples submitted by his girlfriend were matched to remains recovered in Shanksville. The rest of the remains of the hijackers were identified by the process of elimination, and were turned over to the FBI as evidence.

== Mistaken identity ==
Soon after the attacks and before the FBI had released the pictures of all the hijackers, several reports claimed some of the men named as hijackers on 9/11 were alive and had their identities stolen.

== See also ==
- 20th hijacker
- Justice Against Sponsors of Terrorism Act
