= Satam al-Suqami =

Saudi terrorist and 9/11 hijacker (1976–2001)

- سطَّام السُّقامي
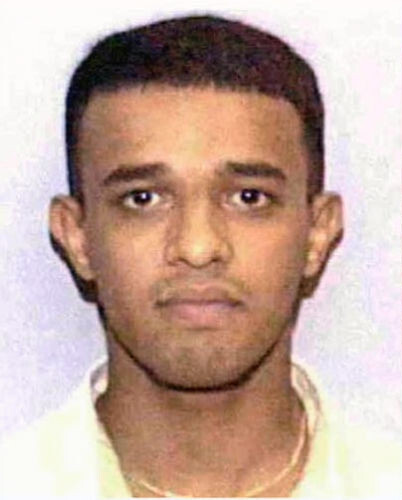
- Al-Suqami in July 2001
- Born: Satam Muhammad Abd al-Rahman al-Suqami; June 28, 1976; Riyadh, Saudi Arabia
- Died: September 11, 2001 (aged 25); New York City, U.S.
- Cause of death: Suicide by plane crash against the North Tower (September 11 attacks)
- Known for: Muscle hijacker of American Airlines Flight 11 as part of the September 11 attacks
- Height: 5 ft 7 in (1.70 m)

Satam Muhammad Abd al-Rahman al-Suqami (Arabic: سطَّام مُحَمَّدُ عَبْدِ اَلرَّحْمَـٰن السُّقامي, romanized: Saṭām Muḥammad ʿAbd ar-Raḥmān as-Suqāmī; June 28, 1976 – September 11, 2001) was a Saudi terrorist hijacker. He was one of five hijackers of American Airlines Flight 11 as part of the September 11 attacks in 2001.

Al-Suqami was recruited into al-Qaeda around 1999, along with his friend Majed Moqed, who was one of the hijackers of American Airlines Flight 77. He traveled to Taliban-controlled Afghanistan where he was chosen to participate in the 9/11 attacks.

He arrived in the United States in April 2001. On September 11, 2001, al-Suqami boarded American Airlines Flight 11 and participated in the hijacking of the plane so that it could be crashed into the North Tower of the World Trade Center as part of the coordinated attacks. He is believed to have perpetrated the first fatality of the attacks in killing passenger Daniel Lewin in the process of hijacking the plane. Al-Suqami died, along with everyone else onboard the plane, when it impacted the North Tower.

== Early life ==
Little is known about the early life of Satam al-Suqami. A native of Riyadh, the capital of Saudi Arabia, he had very little education. At some point in his life, al-Suqami reportedly worked as a security guard for a hospital in Ta'if. He appeared to be unconcerned with religion, engaged in drinking, and may have had problems with drug and alcohol abuse. He was not known by Saudi authorities to be engaged in extremist activities. He had a minor criminal record. Most Saudi muscle hijackers developed their ties to extremism inside Saudi Arabia, often in local mosques, and most started to break contact with their families in 1999 or 2000. Al-Suqami reportedly travelled to Afghanistan in 1999 along with Majed Moqed (eventual hijacker of American Airlines Flight 77). Both trained for al-Qaeda at Khalden training camp, a large training facility in Paktia province that was run by Ibn al-Shaykh al-Libi. Both al-Suqami and Moqed seem not to have any ties to each other or to any other al-Qaeda operatives before getting involved with extremism, most likely in 1999.

== Career ==
The Federal Bureau of Investigation (FBI) says al-Suqami first arrived in the United States on April 23, 2001, with a visa that allowed him to remain in the country until May 21. However, at least five residents of the Spanish Trace Apartments claim to recognize the photographs of both al-Suqami and Salem al-Hazmi, the younger brother of 9/11 hijacker Nawaf al-Hazmi, as living in the San Antonio complex earlier in 2001. Although, these residents and several others who claim to have known the hijackers, claim that the FBI photographs of al-Suqami and al-Hazmi are reversed.

On May 19, al-Suqami and Waleed al-Shehri took a flight from Fort Lauderdale to Freeport, Bahamas where they had reservations at the Princess Resort. Lacking proper documentation, they were stopped upon landing, and returned to Florida the same day and rented a car.

He was one of nine hijackers to open a SunTrust bank account with a cash deposit around June 2001. On July 3, he used his Saudi license to gain a Florida identification card bearing the same home address as Wail al-Shehri, a Homing Inn in Boynton Beach. Despite this, the 9/11 Commission claims that al-Suqami was the only hijacker to not have any US identification.

During the summer, al-Suqami and brothers Wail and Waleed al-Shehri purchased one month passes to a Boynton Beach gym owned by Jim Woolard. (Mohamed Atta and Marwan al-Shehhi also reportedly trained at a gym owned by Woolard, in Delray Beach.)

Known as Azmi during the preparations, al-Suqami was called one of the "muscle" hijackers, who were not expected to act as pilots. CIA director George Tenet later said that they "probably were told little more than that they were headed for a suicide mission inside the United States."

== September 11 attacks and death ==
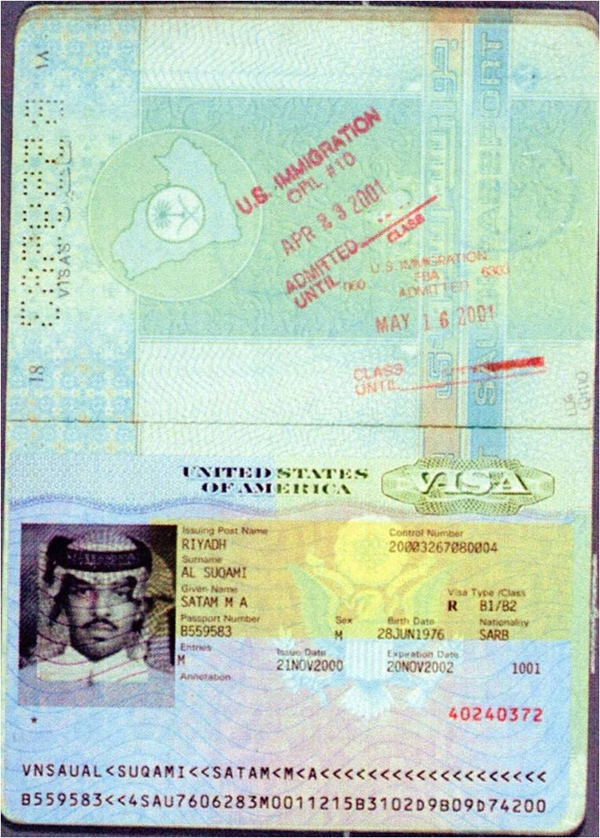
Al-Suqami's visa, recovered from the crash site

On September 10, 2001, al-Suqami shared a room at the Milner Hotel in Boston with three of the Flight 175 hijackers, Marwan al-Shehhi, Fayez Banihammad, and Mohand al-Shehri.

On the day of the attacks, al-Suqami checked in at the flight desk using his Saudi passport, and boarded American Airlines Flight 11. At Logan International Airport, he was selected by CAPPS, which required his checked bags to undergo extra screening for explosives and involved no extra screening at the passenger security checkpoint.

Al-Suqami was seated in business class, in seat 10B, directly behind Daniel Lewin, co-founder of Akamai Technologies and a former member of the Israeli Sayeret Matkal (seated in 9B), and two rows behind hijackers Mohamed Atta and Abdulaziz al-Omari (seated in 8D and 8G, respectively). According to the 9/11 Commission Report, the hijacking started around 8:14 a.m. The hijackers stabbed flight attendants Karen Martin and Barbara Arestegui, slashed passenger Daniel Lewin's throat, and stormed the cockpit. Flight attendants on the plane who contacted airline officials from the plane reported that Lewin was fatally stabbed by the terrorist sitting behind him, this being Satam al-Suqami. One version of events is that al-Suqami attacked Lewin, unprovoked, to frighten other passengers and crew into compliance. (Note: On Flight 93, Mark Rothenberg was stabbed to death prior to the hijacking, and seated in a similar position, just in front of the rear-most hijacker.) The Commission speculated that Lewin, being a veteran of the Israeli military, may have attempted to confront Atta or al-Omari, who had been seated in front of him, unaware that Satam al-Suqami was sitting behind him, who proceeded to withdraw his blade and kill him. (Note: A 2001 FAA memo suggests he may have been stabbed by al-Suqami after attempting to thwart the hijacking. According to the memo, Lewin was seated in business class in seat 9B, near hijackers Mohamed Atta, Abdulaziz al-Omari, and al-Suqami. Initial reports indicated that he had been shot by al-Suqami, but the final draft of the memo omitted all references to gunfire.) Lewin was identified as the first victim of the September 11 attacks.

Al-Suqami died along with all other still-living occupants of the flight when hijacker-pilot Mohamed Atta deliberately crashed it into the North Tower of the World Trade Center at 8:46 AM. The impact in the North Tower occurred between the 93rd and 99th floors and everyone above the 91st floor were trapped and later died in the collapse of the North Tower at 10:28 AM due to all escape routes being severed from the 92nd floor up. Al-Suqami's passport was found by a passerby in the vicinity of Vesey Street, who delivered it to a NYPD officer, before the towers collapsed. This was one of four of the hijackers' original paper passports that totally or partially survived the attacks (the others being the passports of Ziad Jarrah and Saeed al-Ghamdi, recovered from the crash site of United Airlines Flight 93, and that of Abdulaziz al-Omari, found intact in the luggage that did not make it in time into American Airlines Flight 11 during his and Atta's rushed check-in in Logan Airport from their connecting flight from Portland, Maine). Digital copies of other hijackers' passports were later found in post-9/11 investigations. According to a January 2004 testimony before the 9/11 Commission by lead counsel Susan Ginsburg, al-Suqami's passport had "clearly" been "manipulated in a fraudulent manner in ways that have been associated with al-Qaeda", a tactic used during the planning of the September 11 attacks to hide parts of the terrorists' travel histories, namely to Taliban-occupied Afghanistan.

== In popular culture ==
Swedish-Lebanese actor Dani Jazzar portrayed Al-Suqami in BBC docudrama Zero Hour Season 1: Episode 2 (2004) called "The Last Hour of Flight 11".

== See also ==
- PENTTBOM
- Hijackers in the September 11 attacks
