= United Airlines Flight 175 =

9/11 hijacked passenger flight

- UA 175's path from Logan International Airport in Boston to New York City

Hijacking
- Date: September 11, 2001
- Summary: Terrorist suicide hijacking
- Site: South Tower (WTC 2) of the World Trade Center, New York City, U.S.; 40°42′38.8″N 74°00′47.3″W
- Total fatalities: c. 1,000 (Note: It is impossible to definitively know exactly how many people died from the hijacking and crash of United Airlines Flight 175, since this crash and the one of American Airlines Flight 11 happened in the same place, at about the same time, and it is hard to distinguish who died from which plane. It is known for certain, however, that the sum of plane and ground fatalities caused by both suicide attacks is 2,763. In addition to the rough estimate of 1,000 ground fatalities blamed on Flight 175, the number of people aboard the hijacked flight was 65. The death toll of Flight 175 thus comes out to approximately 1,060 when rounded.) (including 5 hijackers)

Aircraft
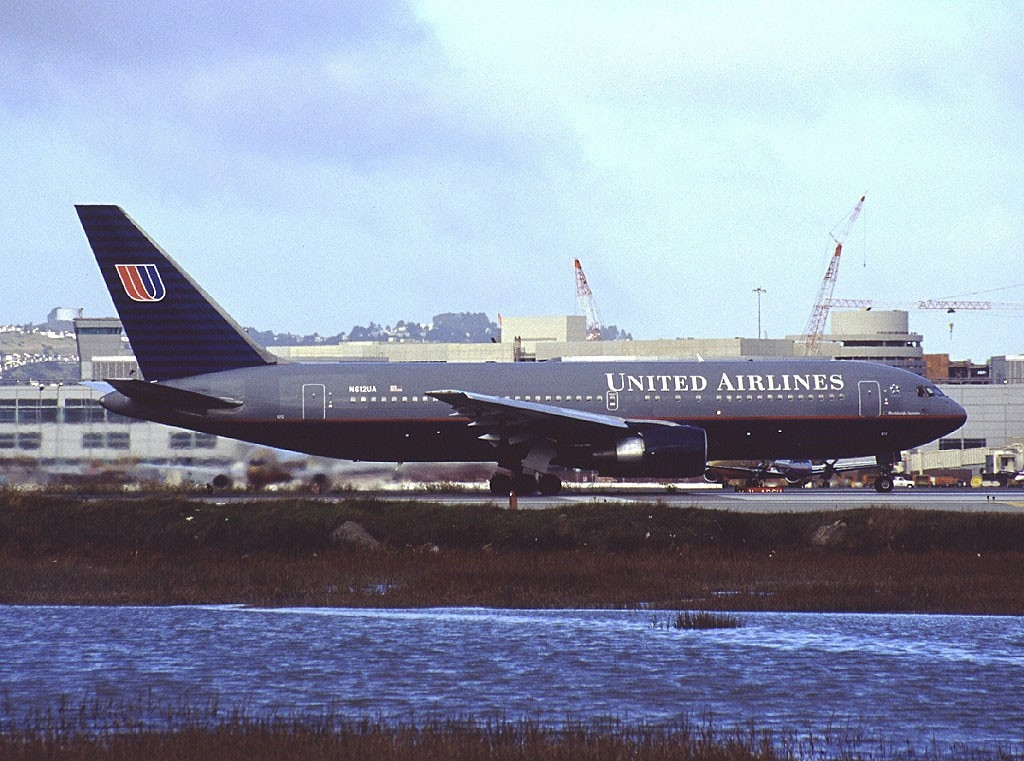
- N612UA, the aircraft involved in the hijacking, seen in 1999
- Aircraft type: Boeing 767-222 (Note: The aircraft was a Boeing 767-200 model; Boeing assigns a unique code for each company that buys one of its aircraft, which is applied as an infix to the model number at the time the aircraft is built, hence "767-222" designates a 767-200 built for United Airlines (customer code 22).)
- Operator: United Airlines
- IATA flight No.: UA175
- ICAO flight No.: UAL175
- Call sign: UNITED 175
- Registration: N612UA
- Flight origin: Logan International Airport, Boston, Massachusetts, U.S.
- Destination: Los Angeles International Airport, Los Angeles, California, U.S.
- Occupants: 65 (including 5 hijackers)
- Passengers: 56 (including 5 hijackers)
- Crew: 9
- Fatalities: 65 (including 5 hijackers)
- Survivors: 0

Ground casualties
- Ground fatalities: c. 900

United Airlines Flight 175 was an American domestic passenger flight from Logan International Airport in Boston to Los Angeles International Airport in California that was hijacked by five al-Qaeda terrorists on the morning of September 11, 2001, as part of the September 11 attacks. The hijacked airliner was deliberately crashed into the South Tower of the World Trade Center complex in New York City, killing all 65 people aboard the flight, and resulting in the deaths of more than 600 (Note: The precise number of those killed or trapped by Flight 175's impact has never been conclusively verified, although it is estimated that between 619 and 690 people were present on floors 77–110 at 09:03 and only 18 of them survived.) people in the South Tower's upper levels, in addition to an unknown number of civilians and emergency personnel on floors beneath the impact zone.

The hijacking and crash of Flight 175 is the second-deadliest plane crash in aviation history, surpassed only by American Airlines Flight 11, which struck the North Tower 17 minutes prior to Flight 175's crash. The aircraft involved was a Boeing 767 operating United Airlines' daily scheduled morning transcontinental service from Boston Logan International Airport to Los Angeles International Airport.

Flight 175 departed from Logan Airport at 08:14. Twenty-eight minutes into the flight, the hijackers injured several crew members, forced their way into the cockpit, and killed both pilots while moving anyone who remained to the rear of the aircraft. Lead hijacker Marwan al-Shehhi, who had trained as a pilot for the purposes of the attacks, took over the flight controls once the hijackers killed the captain and first officer. Unlike the team on American Airlines Flight 11, the terrorists aboard Flight 175 did not switch off the plane's transponder when they took over the cockpit. Thus, the aircraft was visible on New York Center's radar, which depicted the deviation from its assigned flight path before controllers took notice four minutes later at 08:51 EDT. Upon realizing, the ATC workers immediately made several unsuccessful attempts to contact the cockpit of the hijacked airliner, which twice nearly collided with other planes as it flew toward New York City. In the interim, three people were able to get through to their family members and colleagues on the ground, passing on information to do with the hijackers as well as casualties suffered by the flight crew.

No more than 21 minutes after the hijacking began, al-Shehhi crashed the airplane into the South Tower's south face from floors 77 through 85 as part of an attack coordinated with the takeover of Flight 11, which had struck the upper floors of the World Trade Center's North Tower at 08:46. Media coverage of the disaster that began in the North Tower 17 minutes earlier meant Flight 175's impact at 09:03 was the only one of the four attacks to be televised live around the world. The damage done to the South Tower by the crash and subsequent fire caused its collapse 56 minutes later at 09:59, killing everyone who was still inside. During the recovery effort at the World Trade Center site, workers uncovered and identified remains from some Flight 175 victims, but many victims have not been identified.

== Background ==
=== Attacks ===
The flight was hijacked as part of the September 11 attacks. The team was assembled by al-Qaeda leader Osama bin Laden, who also provided the financial and logistical support, and was led by Khalid Sheikh Mohammed, who devised the plot. Bin Laden and Mohammed, along with the hijackers, were motivated by the US’s support for Israel and their intervention in the Middle East. The attacks were given the go ahead by bin Laden in late 1998 or early 1999. The World Trade Center was chosen as one of the targets due to it being a prominent American symbol that represented economic prowess.

=== Hijackers ===
The team of hijackers on United Airlines Flight 175 was led by Marwan al-Shehhi, originally from the United Arab Emirates with a stint in Hamburg, Germany, as a student. By January 2001, the pilot hijackers had completed their training; al-Shehhi obtained a commercial pilot license while training in South Florida, along with American Airlines Flight 11 hijacker Mohamed Atta and Flight 93 hijacker Ziad Jarrah. The hijackers on Flight 175 included Fayez Banihammad, also from the UAE, and three Saudis: brothers Hamza and Ahmed al-Ghamdi, as well as Mohand al-Shehri.

The hijackers were trained at an al-Qaeda camp called Mes Aynak in Kabul, Afghanistan, where they learned about weapons and explosives, followed by training in Karachi, Pakistan, where they learned about "Western culture and travel". Afterwards, they went to Kuala Lumpur, Malaysia, for exercises in airport security and surveillance. Part of the training in Malaysia included boarding flights operated by US carriers so they could observe pre-boarding security screenings, flight crew movements around the cabin, and the timing of cabin services.

A month before the attacks, Marwan al-Shehhi purchased two 4-inch (10.2 cm) pocket knives from a Sports Authority store in Boynton Beach, Florida, while Banihammad bought a two-piece "snap" utility knife set at a Wal-Mart, and Hamza al-Ghamdi bought a Leatherman Wave multi-tool. The hijackers arrived in Boston from Florida between September 7 and 9.

== Flight ==
=== Aircraft ===
The flight was operated by a Boeing 767-200, registration number N612UA built and delivered to United Airlines in 1983. It had a capacity of 168 passengers (10 in first class, 32 in business class, and 126 in economy class). On the day of the attacks, the flight carried only 56 passengers and 9 crew, which represented a 33 percent load factor — well below the average load factor of 49 percent in the three months preceding September 11.

=== Crew ===
The aircraft's pilot in command was Captain Victor Saracini (51), a former Navy fighter pilot with 16 years' service at the airline. The co-pilot was First Officer Michael Horrocks (38), who had previously served as a fighter pilot in the Marine Corps with two years' service at the airline. The cabin crew consisted of purser Kathryn Laborie (42) with seven years' service at the airline, as well as flight attendants Michael Tarrou (38) with 10 years' service at the airline, Amy King (29) with 8 years' service at the airline, Amy Jarret (28) with 6 years' service at the airline, Robert Fangman (33) with 10 months' service at the airline, Alfred Marchand (44) with 9 months' service at the airline, and Alicia Titus (28) with 9 months' service at the airline.

=== Passengers ===
Out of the 60 occupants (excluding the 5 hijackers), there were 50 Americans, 3 Germans, 2 Britons and 1 each originating from Iran, Israel, Indonesia, Ireland, and Canada. There were also three children all under the age of 5 on board. The youngest victim of the September 11 attacks, Christine Hanson (born on February 22, 1999) was on Flight 175. The oldest passenger victim on the airplane was 82-year-old Dorothy DeAraujo of Long Beach, California. Among the other passengers were hockey scout Garnet Bailey and former player Mark Bavis.

=== Boarding ===
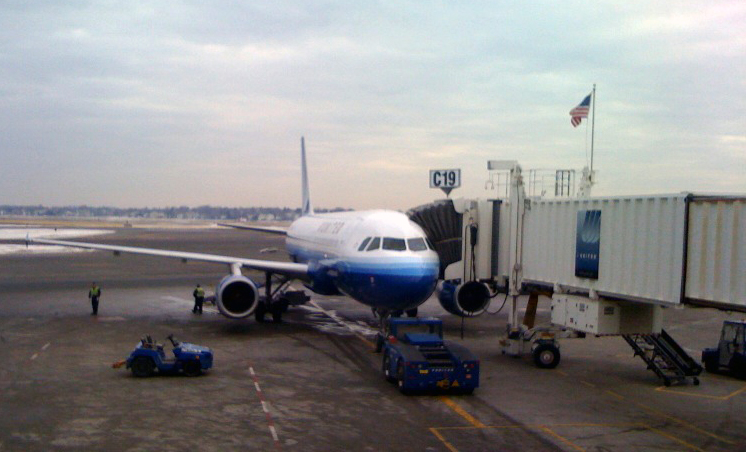
Gate C19 at Boston's Logan International Airport was the boarding gate of United Flight 175 on September 11, 2001. An American flag was added to memorialize the site.

Two hours before boarding, al-Shehhi took a phone call from Ziad Jarrah at 05:01. Jarrah was set to hijack Flight 93 out of Newark, New Jersey, not far from the Twin Towers. The 9/11 Commission concluded the call was intended to confirm that the plot was proceeding. Hamza al-Ghamdi and Ahmed al-Ghamdi checked out of their hotel and called a taxi to take them to Logan International Airport in Boston, Massachusetts. They arrived at the United Airlines counter in Terminal C at 06:20 Eastern Time and Ahmed al-Ghamdi checked two bags. Both hijackers indicated they wanted to purchase tickets, even though they already had paper tickets, which were purchased approximately two weeks before the attacks.

They had trouble answering the standard security questions, so the counter agent repeated the questions very slowly until satisfied with their responses. Al-Shehhi checked a single bag at 06:45, and the other remaining hijackers, Fayez Banihammad and Mohand al-Shehri, checked in at 06:53; Banihammad checked two bags. None of the Flight 175 hijackers were selected for extra scrutiny by the Computer Assisted Passenger Prescreening System (CAPPS).

In the meantime, at 06:52, al-Shehhi approached a payphone and called Mohamed Atta's cellphone. Atta was preparing to board American Airlines Flight 11 from another terminal in Logan, and would fly the plane into the North Tower of the World Trade Center 17 minutes before al-Shehhi crashed into the South Tower. Like the earlier conversation with Jarrah, the intent of this final communication was to confirm that they were both ready to go ahead with the attacks.

Al-Shehhi and the other hijackers boarded Flight 175 between 07:23 and 07:28. Banihammad boarded first and sat in first class seat 2A, while Mohand al-Shehri was in seat 2B. At 07:27, al-Shehhi and Ahmed al-Ghamdi boarded and sat in business class seats 6C and 9D, respectively. One minute later, Hamza al-Ghamdi boarded and sat in 9C.

The flight was scheduled to depart at 08:00 for Los Angeles. Fifty-one passengers and the five hijackers boarded the 767 through Terminal C's Gate 19. The plane pushed back at 07:58 and took off at 08:14 from Runway 9, as Flight 11 was hijacked. Around this time, the Captain and First Officer picked up on an alarming communication from a yet-unidentified aircraft, which they surmised to be the voice of a hijacker; indeed, the communication later turned out to have been made from the cockpit of Flight 11. They reported the transmission after crossing from Boston Center's frequencies to those of New York Center. By 08:33, the aircraft reached cruising altitude of 31,000 feet (9,400 m), which is the point when cabin service would normally begin.

Seeking information on the whereabouts of Flight 11, air traffic controllers asked the pilots of Flight 175 whether they could see the hijacked airliner. The crew could not locate the plane at first, but immediately corrected themselves once they noticed that Flight 11 was at 29,000 feet (8,800 m). ATC then instructed the pilots to turn and avoid Flight 11. By 08:42, Flight 175 made the transition to the airspace of New York Center, allowing the pilots to report the suspicious transmission they heard while climbing out of Logan. "Sounds like someone keyed the mic and said 'Everyone stay in your seats'," Saracini told Dave Bottiglia, the controller dealing with Flight 11. This was the last transmission from Flight 175.

== Hijacking ==
The hijacking occurred sometime between 08:42 and 08:46. The 9/11 Commission concluded that the al-Ghamdi brothers forced the passengers and crew to the rear of the aircraft using knives and bomb threats, while also spraying mace into the confines of the cabin. A flight attendant was stabbed, and both pilots were killed by Fayez Banihammad and Mohand al-Shehri when they breached the cockpit, allowing Marwan al-Shehhi to commandeer the flight controls.

The first operational evidence that something was abnormal on Flight 175 came seconds after the North Tower was struck, when the plane's assigned transponder signal changed from "1470" to "3020" and then one minute later to "3321", and the aircraft began deviating from its assigned course. Bottiglia did not notice until minutes later at 08:51. Unlike Flight 11, which had turned its transponder off, Flight 175's flight data could still be properly monitored.

Also, at 08:51, Flight 175 changed altitude. Over the next three minutes, the controller made five unsuccessful attempts to contact Flight 175 and worked to move other aircraft in the vicinity away from it. At 08:55, a supervisor at the New York Air Traffic Control Center notified the center's operations manager of the Flight 175 hijacking. Now tasked with handling Flight 175, Bottiglia remarked, "We might have a hijack over here, two of them."

=== Near misses ===
N378DA, the Boeing 737 operating as Delta Air lines Flight 2315, involved in the near miss with United 175

N207ME, the DC-9 operating as Midwest Express Flight 007, involved in the near-miss with United 175

Around this time, the flight had a near midair collision with Delta Air Lines Flight 2315, a Boeing 737-800 (N378DA), flying from Hartford to Tampa, reportedly missing the plane by only 300 feet (90 m). Bottiglia instructed the Delta pilot to make collision avoidance maneuvers, adding, "I think [Flight 175] has been hijacked. I don't know his intentions. Take any evasive action necessary." The aircraft's TCAS may have activated; Flight 175 briefly stopped descending at 28,000 feet (8,530 m) and climbed 300 feet (90 m) and started descending again as soon as they passed the Delta plane.

A few moments later, Flight 175 had another near midair collision with TWA Flight 3 flying from New York JFK to St. Louis missing its tail by around 500 feet (150 m). Moments before Flight 175 crashed into the South Tower, it also narrowly avoided colliding with Midwest Express Flight 007, which was flying from Milwaukee to New York LaGuardia. They were forced to make a pair of very quick and very steep dives to avoid a collision, leaving four people aboard with minor injuries. The aircraft, a McDonnell Douglas DC-9-32 (N207ME), received minor damage. Pilot Gerald Earwood said in a later interview that the aircraft passed within about 30 feet (10 m) of his own.

=== Calls ===
Flight attendant Robert Fangman and passengers Peter Hanson and Brian David Sweeney made phone calls from GTE airphones in the rear of the aircraft. Airphone records also indicate that passenger Garnet Bailey attempted to call his wife four times.

At 08:52:01, Robert Fangman called a United Airlines maintenance office in San Francisco and spoke with Marc Policastro. Fangman reported the hijacking and said the hijackers were likely flying the plane. He mentioned that both pilots were dead and that a flight attendant had been stabbed. After 1 minute and 15 seconds, the call was disconnected. Policastro subsequently made attempts to contact the aircraft's cockpit using the Aircraft Communication Addressing and Reporting System (ACARS) message system. He wrote, "I heard of a reported incident aboard your acft [aircraft]. Plz verify all is normal." He received no reply.

Brian David Sweeney tried calling his wife, Julie, at 08:58:45, but ended up leaving a message letting her know the plane had been hijacked. He then called his parents at 09:00:02 and spoke with his mother, Louise. Sweeney told his mother about the hijacking and mentioned that passengers were considering storming the cockpit and taking control of the aircraft. Concerned that the hijackers would return, he informed her that he might have to hang up quickly. After saying their goodbyes, he hung up.

At 08:52:00, Peter Hanson called his father, Lee Hanson, in Easton, Connecticut. Hanson was traveling with his wife, Sue, and their two-year-old daughter, Christine, the youngest victim of the September 11 attacks. The family was originally seated in Row 19, in seats C, D, and E; however, Peter placed the call to his father from seat 30E. Speaking softly, Hanson said the hijackers had commandeered the cockpit, a flight attendant had been stabbed, and that possibly someone else in the front of the aircraft had been killed. He also said the plane was flying erratically. Hanson asked his father to contact United Airlines, but Lee could not get through and instead called the police.

Peter Hanson made a second phone call to his father at 09:00:03:

It's getting bad, Dad. A stewardess was stabbed. They seem to have knives and Mace. They said they have a bomb. It's getting very bad on the plane. Passengers are throwing up and getting sick. The plane is making jerky movements. I don't think the pilot is flying the plane. I think we are going down. I think they intend to go to Chicago or someplace and fly into a building. Don't worry, Dad. If it happens, it'll be very fast ... Oh, my God ... oh, my God, oh, my God.

As the call abruptly ended, Hanson's father heard a woman screaming. He then switched on the television, as did Louise Sweeney in her own home, and both witnessed the plane strike the South Tower.

Two New York air traffic controllers communicate the positioning of United Airlines Flight 175 live.

== Crash ==
At 08:58, Flight 175 was over New Jersey at 28,500 feet (8,700 m), by which point al-Shehhi would have seen the smoke pouring from the North Tower in the distance. The airplane was in a sustained power dive of more than 24,000 feet (7,300 m) in the five minutes and four seconds between approximately 08:58 and the moment of impact, at an average rate of over 5,000 feet (1,500 m) per minute. Bottiglia later said that he and his colleagues "were counting down the altitudes, and they were descending, right at the end, at 10,000 feet per minute. That is absolutely unheard of for a commercial jet."

A diagram of the impact position of both aircraft

(Top) A diagram showing how debris from both aircraft fell after the impact
(Bottom) World Trade Center site with WTC 2
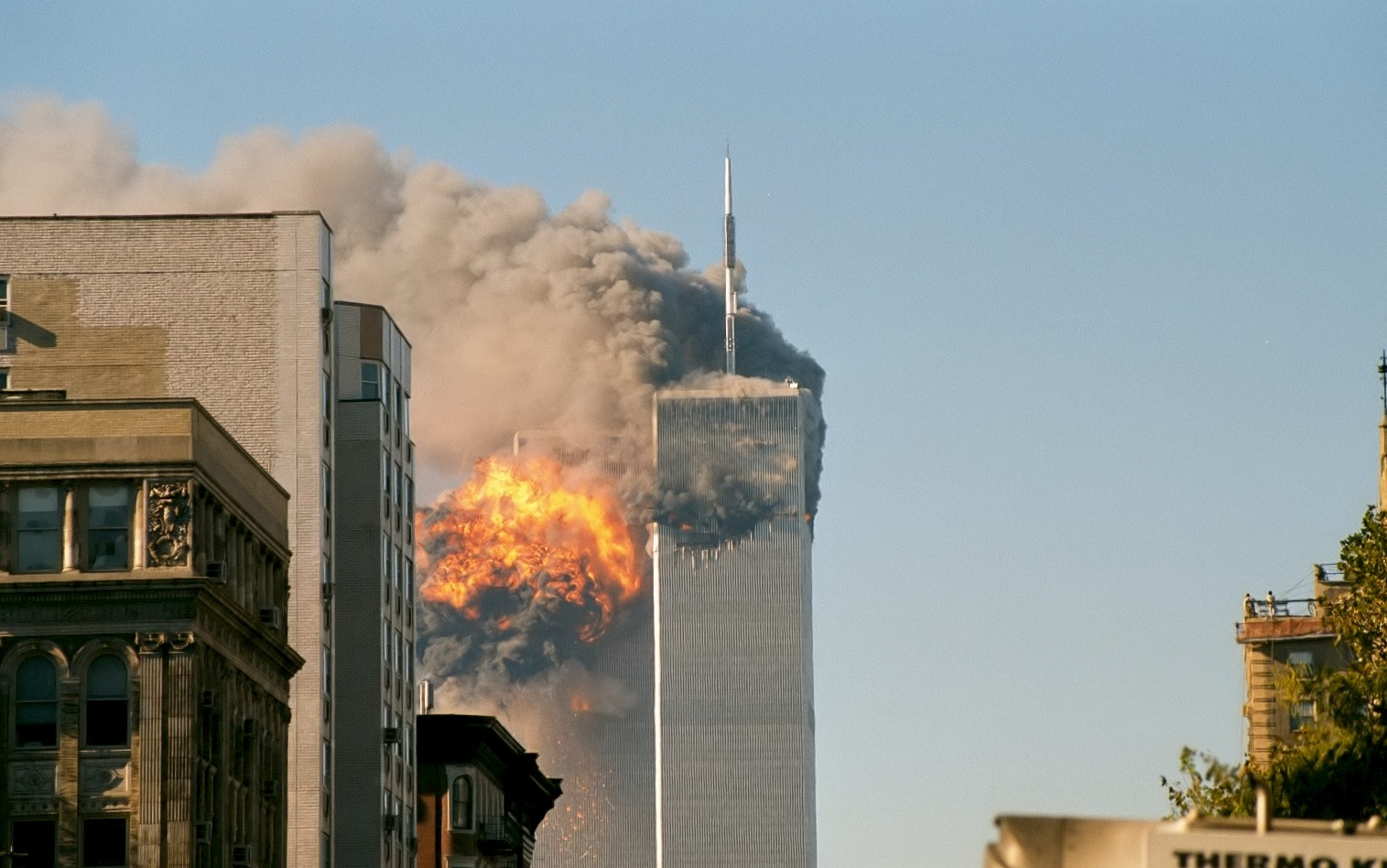
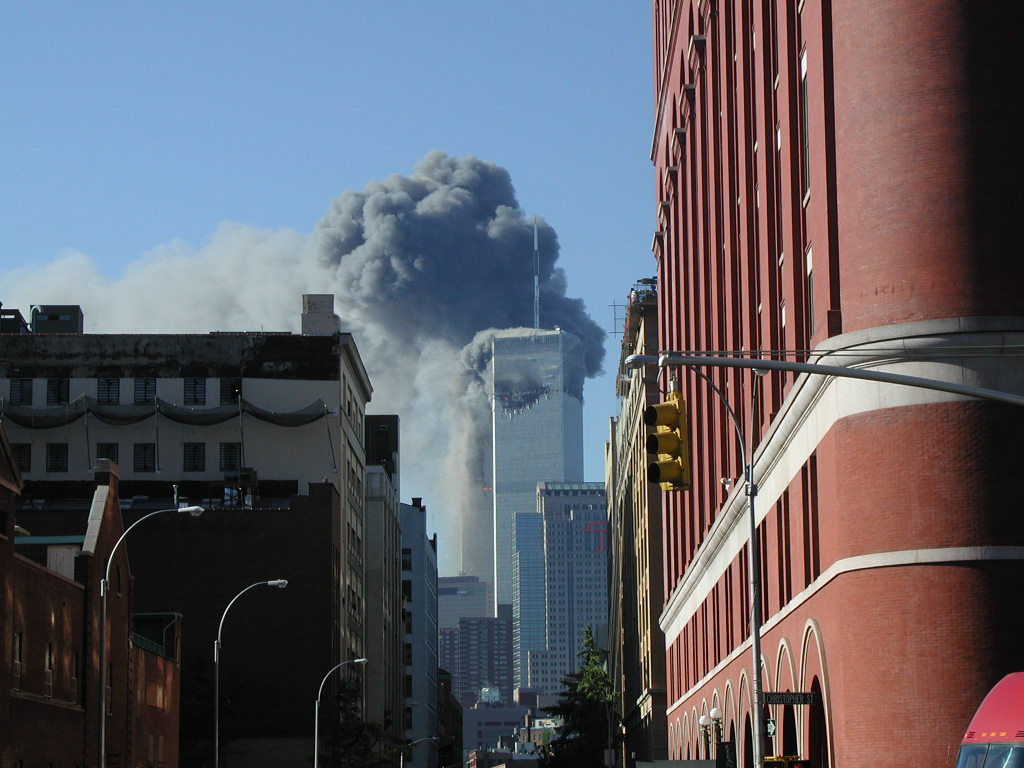
(Top) Flight 175 explodes after hitting the South Tower.
(Bottom) Smoke rising from the South Tower seconds after the crash as seen from Greenwich Street.

Two minutes before impact, New York Center alerted another nearby Air Traffic Facility responsible for low-flying aircraft, which was able to monitor Flight 175's path as it flew over New Jersey, followed by Staten Island and Upper New York Bay as al-Shehhi lined the plane up to strike the South Tower. The aircraft was in a banking left turn in its final moments, as it appeared the plane might have otherwise missed the building or merely scraped it with a wing. Therefore, those on the left side would have had a clear view of the towers approaching, with one burning.

The airplane crashed nose-first into the South Tower's southern facade at a speed of around 587 miles per hour (861 ft/s; 945 km/h; 262 m/s; 510 kn), (Note: Sources disagree on the exact speed of impact. NTSB study in 2002 concluded around 587 mph (510 kn; 262 m/s; 945 km/h), whereas MIT study concluded 503 mph (437 kn; 225 m/s; 810 km/h).) striking floors 77 through 85 with approximately 9,100 U.S. gallons (34,000 L; 7,600 imp gal) of jet fuel on board. All passengers and hijackers on board were killed instantly. By the time Flight 175 struck the South Tower at 09:03, (Note: The exact time is disputed. The 9/11 Commission report says 9:03:11, NIST reports 9:02:59, some other sources report 9:03:02.) multiple media organizations were already covering the first plane crash in the North Tower 17 minutes earlier, with millions watching all around the globe. The image of Flight 175's crash was thus caught on video from multiple vantage points on live television and amateur video, while close to a hundred cameras captured Flight 175 in photographs before it crashed.

Video footage of the crash was replayed numerous times in news broadcasts on the day of the attacks and in the days that followed, before major news networks put restrictions on use of the footage. The initial assumption was that the crash of Flight 11 had been an accident, a mistaken belief that also hindered the process of immediately evacuating the South Tower after the first plane struck the North. This was dispelled when Flight 175 crashed into the South Tower.

The Port Authority initiated an immediate full-scale evacuation of the North Tower within moments of Flight 11's impact. The same was not done for the South Tower during the 17-minute window between the two impacts; instead, the Port Authority instructed workers to remain in place. An estimated 2,900 people descended from floors that were later cut off, before the tower was struck.

More than 600 people were still present on floors 77–110 when the plane struck. The impact killed hundreds, including everyone on the plane and many more inside the South Tower. Unlike at the North Tower, a single stairway was mostly intact from top to bottom after Flight 175 crashed into the South Tower. This was because Flight 11 crashed almost directly midway into the North Tower's central core and severed all escape routes from the 92nd floor up, but al-Shehhi flew the plane into the eastern half of the South Tower's southern facade near the southeast corner while also banking at a severe angle, narrowly missing Stairwell A in the northwest corner.

Only 18 people passed the impact zone through the available stairway and left the South Tower safely before it collapsed. One of these survivors, Stanley Praimnath, saw the plane coming toward him. Smoke, isolated fires and hot gases ventilating through the stairs compelled those who were trapped to either avoid using them entirely, or to head upward in the hopes of a rooftop rescue, while it has been suggested that others may have been in the process of descending from the impact zone when the tower collapsed at 09:59. Those who did not make it out succumbed to the fire and smoke or the tower's eventual collapse. Three people were spotted falling to their deaths from the upper floors of the South Tower, two of whom had jumped to escape conditions inside; firefighter Daniel Suhr reporting to the South Tower was killed when one of these two landed on him. (Note: The NIST report documented three victims who fell from the South Tower's east face, one of whom had evidently jumped to his death and two more who had tried to climb down. The fourth victim went unnoticed by NIST, but was a woman who jumped from the tower's south face and landed on firefighter Danny Suhr near the intersection of West and Liberty Streets.)

The impact of Flight 175 also did some minor damage to the already-burning North Tower, as some windows on the east face nearest to the South Tower blew out the moment the pressure wave generated by the fireball hit them, worsening the fires in the North Tower. After the plane passed through the tower, part of the plane's landing gear and fuselage came out the north side of the skyscraper and crashed through the roof and two of the floors of 45–47 Park Place, between West Broadway and Church Street, 600 feet (200 yd; 180 m) north of the former World Trade Center. Three floor beams of the top floor of the building were destroyed, causing major structural damage.

== Aftermath ==
Flight 175's crash into the South Tower was faster and lower down than that of the North Tower, impacting close to a corner rather than midway into the structure, compromising its structural integrity more. Thus, there was far more structural weight pressing down on an unbalanced, damaged section of the building on fire. The South Tower collapsed at 9:59 a.m. after burning for 56 minutes. (Note: NIST and the 9/11 Commission both give the time as 9:58:59 a.m., which is subsequently rounded to 9:59 for simplicity. If the Commission's claim that the South Tower was struck at 9:03:11 is to be believed, then it collapsed after 55 minutes and 48 seconds, not 56 minutes.) The National Institute of Standards and Technology attributed the collapse to fires fed by the aircraft's jet fuel acting on structure already damaged by the impact. The South Tower was the first of the two skyscrapers to collapse despite being the second to be hit. Nobody who was in the South Tower at the time of its collapse survived.

The flight recorders for Flight 175, as with Flight 11's, were never found. Some debris from Flight 175 was recovered nearby, including the landing gear found on top of a building on the corner of West Broadway and Park Place, an engine found at Church and Murray Street, and a section of the fuselage which landed on top of 5 World Trade Center. In April 2013, a piece of the inboard wing flap mechanism from a Boeing 767 was discovered wedged between two buildings at Park Place.

Ahmed al-Ghamdi's Saudi Arabian driver's license was recovered from the World Trade Center site.

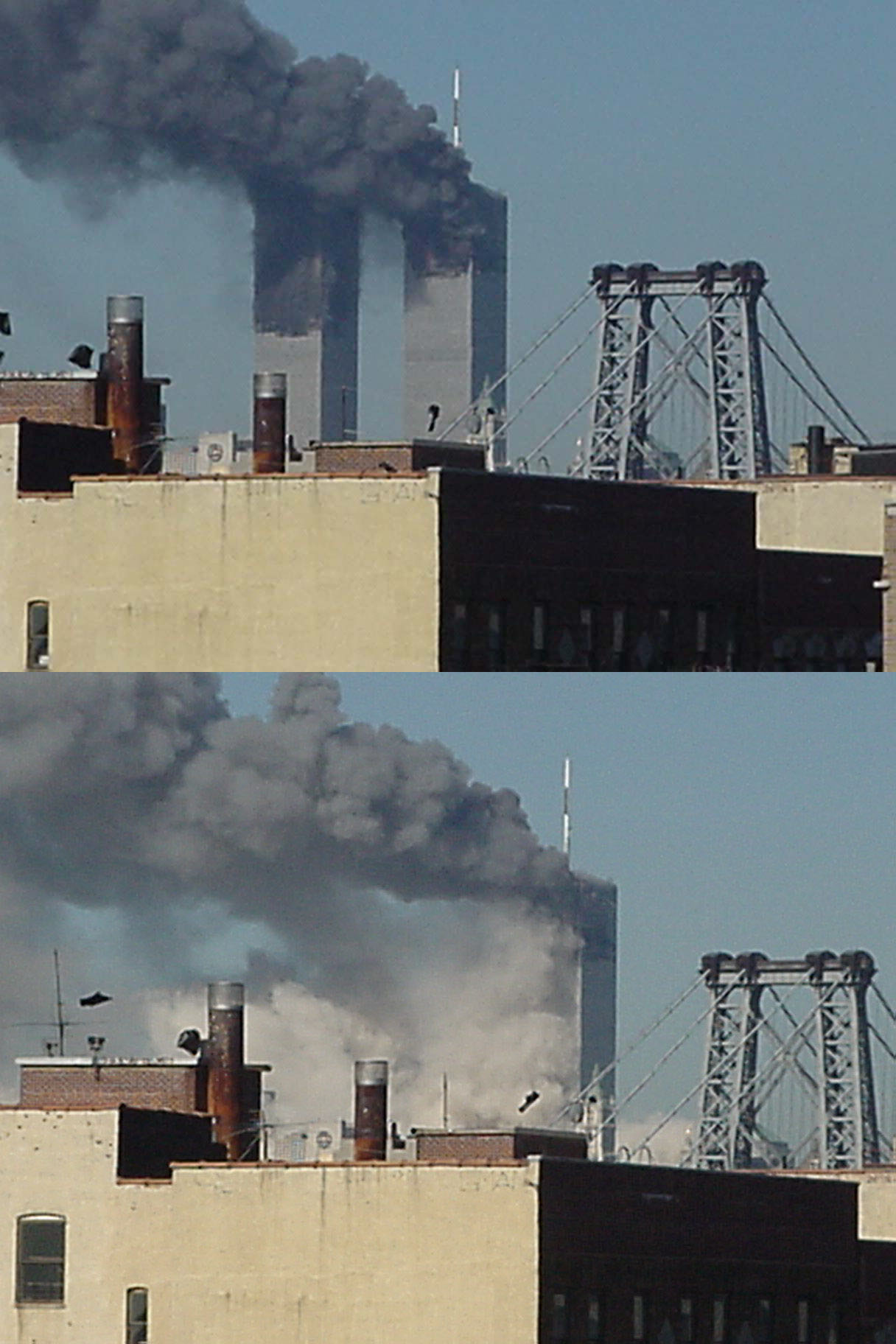
After burning for 56 minutes, the South Tower collapsed at 9:59, 29 minutes before the North Tower's collapse, despite being hit 17 minutes later.

During the recovery process, small fragments were identified from some passengers on Flight 175, including a 6 in (15 cm) piece of bone belonging to Peter Hanson and small bone fragments of Lisa Frost. In 2008, the remains of Flight 175 passenger Alona Abraham were identified using DNA samples. Remains of many others aboard Flight 175 were never recovered.

United Airlines retired the flight numbers 175 and 93 after the attacks. It was reported in May 2011 that the company was reactivating them as a codeshare operated by Continental Airlines, drawing criticism from the Air Line Pilots Association and from news outlets including The Wall Street Journal. United said the numbers were "inadvertently reinstated" and would not be reactivated.

The names of the victims of Flight 175 are inscribed at the National September 11 Memorial & Museum.

The federal government provided financial aid – a minimum of $500,000 – for the families of victims who died in the attack. Individuals who accepted funds from the government were required to forfeit their ability to sue any entity for damages. More than $7 billion has been paid out to victims by the September 11th Victim Compensation Fund, although that figure includes damages to those who were injured or killed on the other hijacked flights or the towers. In total, lawsuits were filed on behalf of 96 people against the airline and associated companies. The vast majority were settled under terms that were not made public, but the total compensation is estimated to be around $500 million.

Only one lawsuit progressed to a civil trial; a wrongful death filing by the family of Mark Bavis against the airline, Boeing, and the airport's security company. This was eventually settled in September 2011. US president George W. Bush, other top officials, and various government agencies were also sued by Ellen Mariani, widow of passenger Louis Neil Mariani. A federal court sanctioned her attorney over the filing, and the cases were dismissed.

== Gallery ==
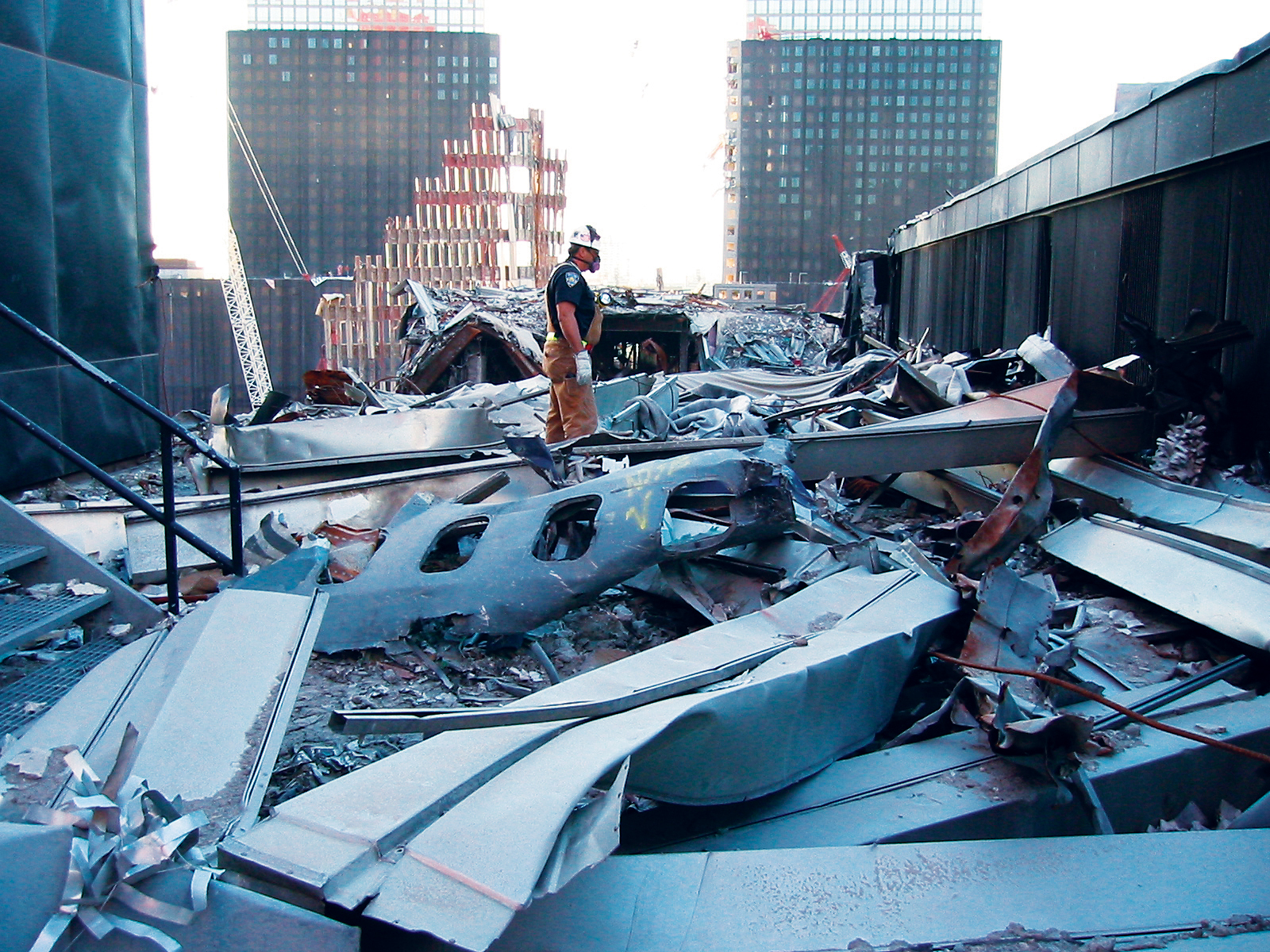
A piece of fuselage on the roof of 5 World Trade Center

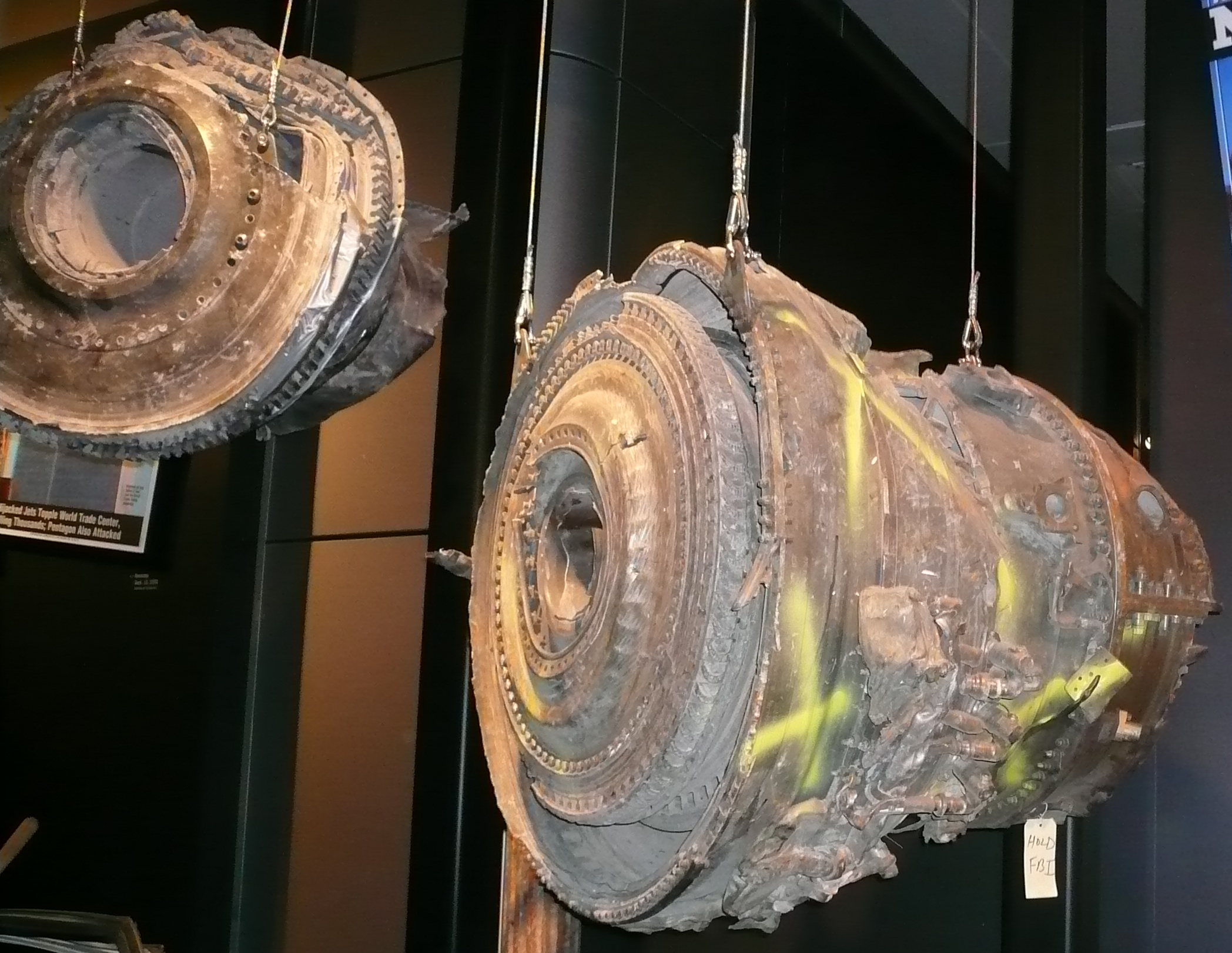
Airplane engine parts from Flight 175

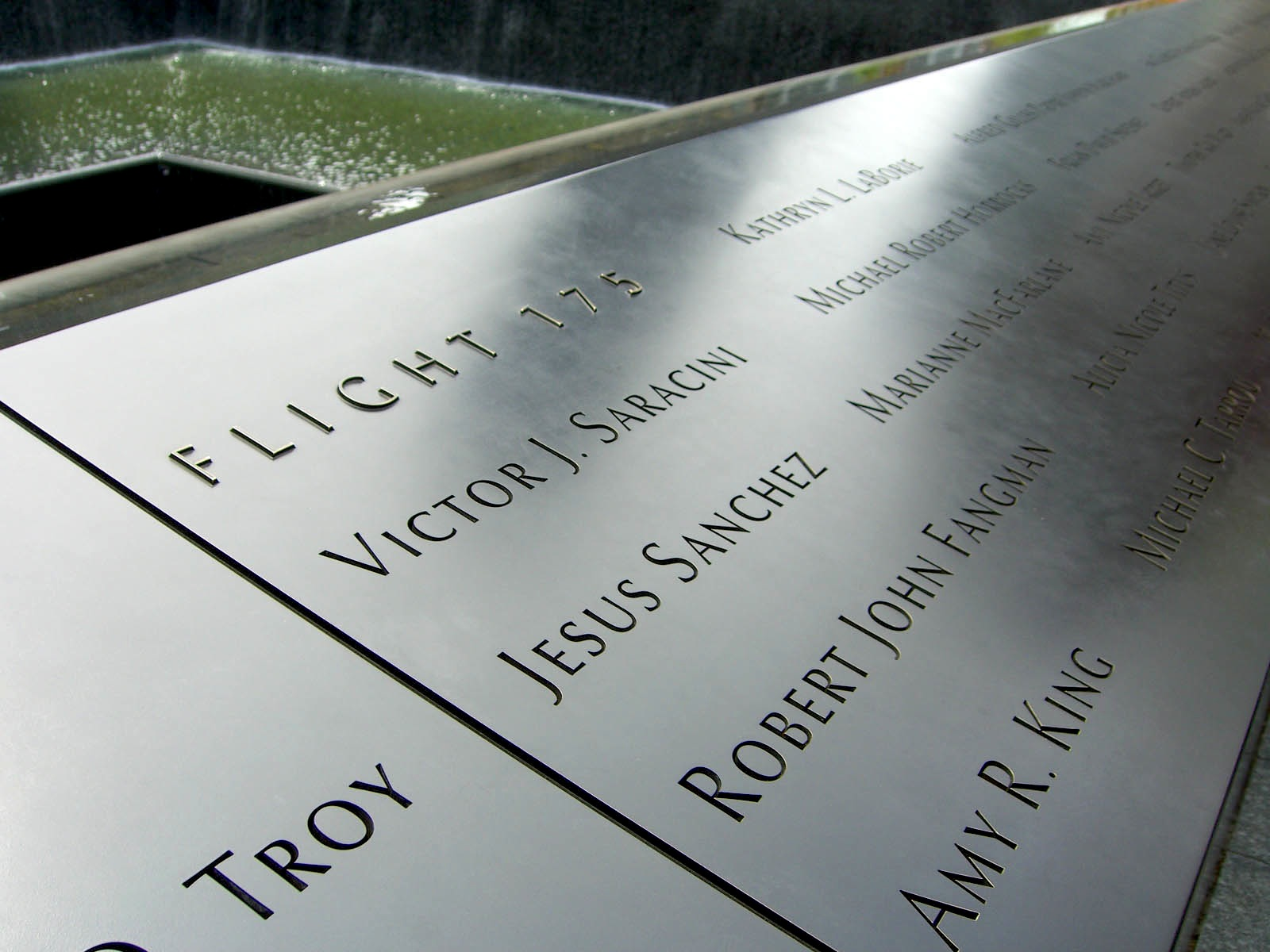
Panel S-2 of the National September 11 Memorial & Museum's South Pool, one of three on which the names of victims from Flight 175 are inscribed

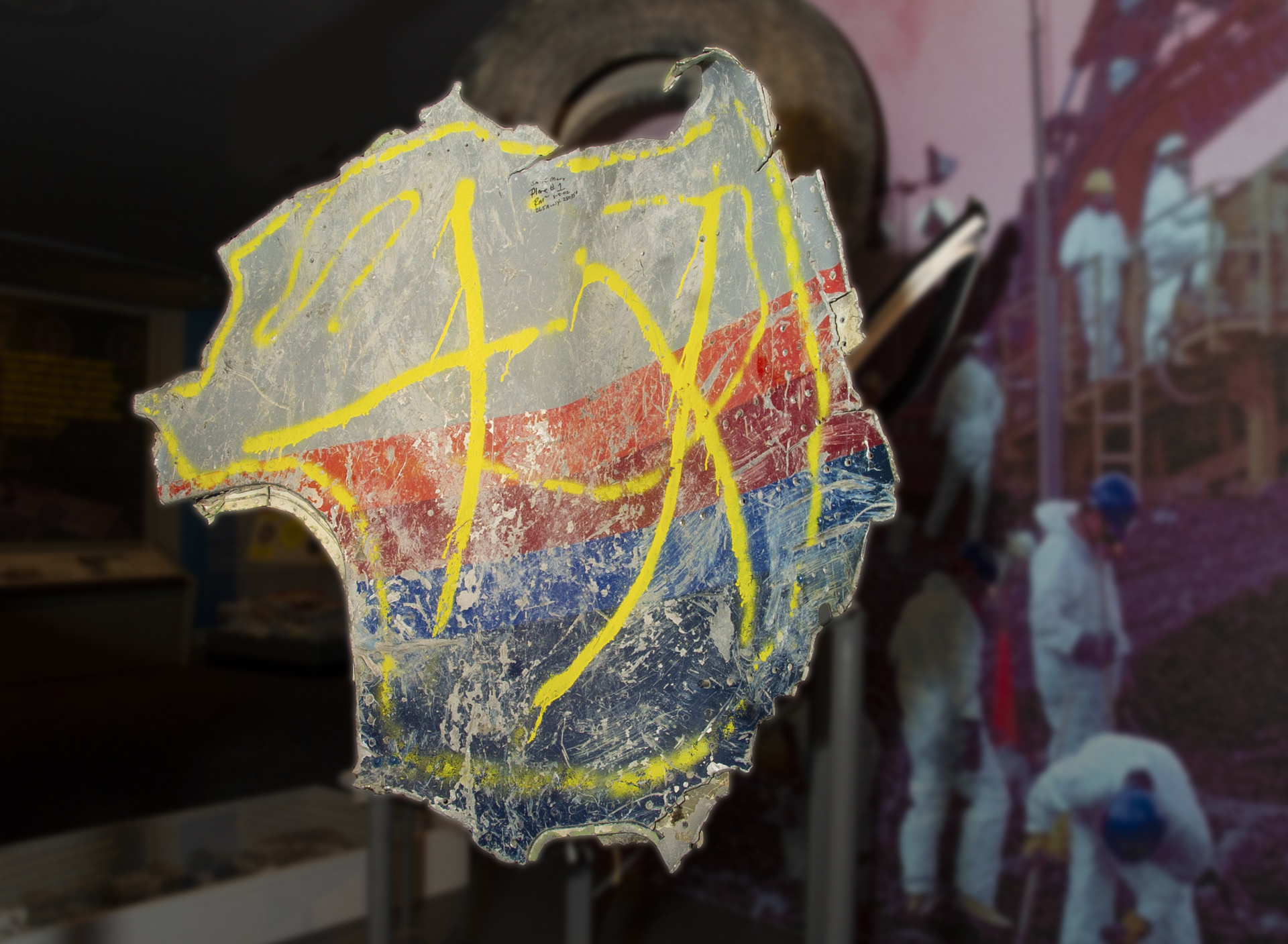
A portion of the fuselage from the flight

== See also ==
- Malaysian Airline System Flight 653
- Indian Airlines Flight 814
- TWA Flight 847
- List of aircraft hijackings
- 2 World Trade Center (1971–2001)
- "The Pet Goat"
