= Fayez Banihammad =

Emirati terrorist and 9/11 hijacker (1977–2001)

- فايز بني حماد
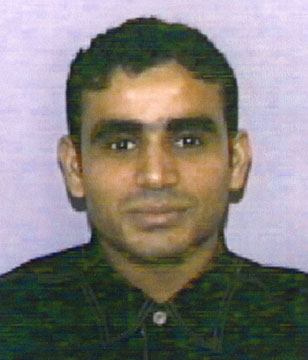
- Banihammad in July 2001
- Born: Fayez Rashid Ahmed Hassan al-Qadi Banihammad; March 19, 1977; Khor Fakkan, United Arab Emirates
- Died: September 11, 2001 (aged 24); New York City, U.S.
- Cause of death: Suicide by plane crash against the South Tower during the September 11 attacks
- Known for: Muscle hijacker of United Airlines Flight 175 as part of the September 11 attacks
- Height: 5 ft 10 in (1.78 m)

Fayez Rashid Ahmed Hassan al-Qadi Banihammad (Note: Full name: Fāyaz Rāshid Aḥmad Ḥasan al-Qāḍī Banī Ḥammād, Arabic: فايز راشد احمد حسن القاضي بني حماد) (March 19, 1977 – September 11, 2001) was an Emirati terrorist hijacker from al-Qaeda who was one of the five terrorist hijackers aboard United Airlines Flight 175 that was flown into the South Tower of the World Trade Center during the September 11 attacks.

In 1999, Banihammad left the United Arab Emirates (UAE) for Saudi Arabia, where he joined the al-Qaeda terrorist group. He met Mustafa al-Hawsawi, who allegedly funded the attacks.

He entered the United States on a tourist visa, and on August 29, 2001, Banihammad paid for his flight ticket. United Flight 175 was meant to fly from Boston's Logan Airport to Los Angeles International Airport. On the day of the attacks, on September 11, 2001, he boarded that same flight, and after the plane took off, he assisted in its hijacking, when his group of hijackers forced their way into the cockpit. Hijacker-pilot Marwan al-Shehhi, the only other Emirati involved in the attacks, took control of the plane, and flew it into the World Trade Center's South Tower, killing everyone on board.

== Early life ==
Fayez Rashid Ahmed Hassan al-Qadi Banihammad (who used many aliases but is mainly known as Fayez Banihammad) was born on March 19, 1977. He was the son of a school principal, and grew up in the city of Khor Fakkan, which is located in Sharjah, an Emirate of the UAE.

Little is known about Banihammad's life prior to his involvement with al-Qaeda. In an FBI report after the attacks, investigators considered him an 'anomaly'. Banihammad was married to a Syrian national and had a child. It was reported that he worked as an immigration officer in the UAE at some point prior to joining al-Qaeda. According to an FBI report, his bank records with Standard Chartered listed his employment as Al Khatab Aluminum Company located in Khor Fakkan, where it was stated he worked in a managerial position.

Banihammad's family claimed he left the UAE in 1999, saying he was going to join an Islamic relief organization. Instead, he would go to Saudi Arabia, where he joined the al-Qaeda terrorist group. He and his family had only one phone call after he left. It is still not public knowledge how Banihammad was recruited by Al-Qaeda.

== September 11 attacks ==
=== Background ===
The September 11 attacks were a series of terrorist attacks on the United States in 2001, formulated by the al-Qaeda leader Osama bin Laden and Khalid Sheikh Mohammad. They would be committed by 19 attackers, targeting four locations with four hijacked commercial planes. Three of these locations were each of the Twin Towers of the World Trade Center in New York City and the Pentagon near Washington, D.C. The fourth target was potentially the U.S. Capitol Building in Washington, D.C., but the fourth plane was unsuccessful in hitting it, because of a revolt by its passengers.

Banihammad was one of the hijackers. He was described as one of the "bit players" within his group, which targeted the World Trade Center's South Tower. The others were Ahmed al-Ghamdi, Hamza al-Ghamdi, Marwan al-Shehhi, and Mohand al-Shehri. However, he still played a "unique role" in his group; during his time in Saudi Arabia, he met Saudi businessman Mustafa al-Hawsawi, who is alleged to have funded the attacks. Banihammad had previously spent one year at university with al-Shehri. He was one of two Emiratis to participate in the attacks, the other being al-Shehhi. At the time of the attacks, he was 24.

=== Planning ===
Banihammad received his tourist visa on June 18, 2001, one of three hijackers which received their visa much later than the others. Khalid Sheikh Mohammad claimed these three hijackers were not replacements for unsuccessful candidates, but rather extra men to increase the odds of success. Before arriving in the United States, he made bank accounts in the United Arab Emirates, at the same bank and time as al-Hawsawi. Familiar with the country's procedures, Banihammad helped al-Hawsawi complete his account application. He gave al-Hawsawi $3,000 and granted him power of attorney over his own account, so al-Hawsawi could forward a bank card to him while he was in the United States. This is likely when al-Hawsawi's role as a financial facilitator of the attacks began. $30,000 was deposited into Banihammad's account on June 25. On June 27, he arrived in the United States using his tourist visa. He landed at Orlando after taking a flight from London. After that, he made Visa and ATM withdrawals from his UAE accounts.

Banihammad most likely lived in Florida during the planning, potentially with al-Shehhi and Mohamed Atta (the attacks' ringleader) at their apartment in Hollywood, or with other hijackers. He reportedly took flight lessons with Atta in Florida. His pilot's license had an address for a flight school in Tulsa, but the school had no record of him attending. A person with his name did attend the Lackland Air Force Base Defense Language Institute in San Antonio. In July, he rented a postal box at Mail Boxes Etc. in Delray Beach, and on August 29, he paid for a first-class seat, 2A, on United Airlines Flight 175, using the postal address. The flight was scheduled to fly from Boston's Logan Airport to Los Angeles on September 11. It would depart from Logan Airport along with American Airlines Flight 11, which Atta was on.

In early September, al-Hawsawi received a Western Union transfer of $26,000 from Atta, al-Shehhi, Waleed al-Shehri, and Banihammad. The FBI believed this transaction was the hijackers returning their unused funds as they did not want to "die as thieves". al-Hawsawi later cleaned out Banihammad's bank account in Dubai, and he could do so because he had power of attorney over it.

=== Day of the attacks ===
On September 11, Banihammad and his group checked in for Flight 175, which was scheduled to depart at 8:00 a.m. They were armed with knives and mace, but none of them were checked by CAPPS. Between 7:23 and 7:28, the group boarded. Banihammad sat in seat 2A. There were 56 passengers and 9 crew on board in total. At some point, while both Flight 11 and Flight 175 were on the Logan tarmac, Atta and Marwan al-Shehhi talked on their cell phones, confirming their final plan. Flight 175 departed Logan at 8:14. Around 8:42 to 8:46, the hijackers likely forced their way into the cockpit and stabbed the pilots to death. One of the hijackers stabbed the flight crew and told the other passengers to get back. Al-Shehhi started controlling the plane. Five minutes later, he changed course.

At 9:03 a.m., Flight 175 struck the South Tower. The plane, flying at around 590 mph (950 km/h), hit the 81st floor, and made a hole from the 77th to the 85th floors. All 65 people on board the plane, including the hijackers, died. Flights 11 and 175 each heavily damaged their respective targets, and both towers collapsed. The South Tower collapsed first, at 9:59 a.m., killing everyone inside the building. More than 600 deaths came from the attack on the South Tower.

== Aftermath ==
During the FBI's investigation into the attacks, they learned from Ahmed al-Hada, the father-in-law of hijacker Khalid al-Mihdhar, that Banihammad was Emirati. Banihammad was named as an unindicted co-conspirator in the indictment of Zacarias Moussaoui.

== See also ==
- Hijackers in the September 11 attacks
- PENTTBOM
