= Salem al-Hazmi =

Saudi terrorist and 9/11 hijacker (1981–2001)

- سالم الحازمي
- al-Hazmi in August 2001
- Born: Salem Muhammed al-Hazmi; February 2, 1981; Mecca, Saudi Arabia
- Died: September 11, 2001 (aged 20); Arlington County, Virginia, U.S.
- Cause of death: Suicide by plane crash against the Pentagon during the September 11 attacks
- Known for: Muscle hijacker of American Airlines Flight 77 as part of the September 11 attacks
- Relatives: Nawaf al-Hazmi (brother)

Salem Muhammed Salem al-Hazmi (Arabic: سالم محمد سالم الحازمي, romanized: Sālam al-Ḥāzmī; February 2, 1981 – September 11, 2001) was a Saudi terrorist who was one of the five hijackers who assisted in the hijacking of American Airlines Flight 77 as part of the September 11 attacks.

Al-Hazmi had a relatively long history with al-Qaeda before being selected for the attacks. He obtained a tourist visa through the Visa Express program and arrived in the United States in June 2001 where he would settle in New Jersey with other American 77 hijackers up until the attacks.

On September 11, 2001, al-Hazmi boarded Flight 77, alongside four accomplices, including his older brother Nawaf al-Hazmi. He and his team of hijackers helped subdue the passengers and crew, allowing the team's suicide pilot, Hani Hanjour, to take control of the plane and deliberately crash it into the Pentagon, near Washington, D.C., killing everyone aboard the flight, including al-Hazmi. Al-Hazmi had turned 20 that same year, making him the youngest of the nineteen terrorists to perpetrate the attacks.

== Biography ==
Salem Muhammed al-Hazmi was born on February 2, 1981, to Muhammad Salim al-Hazmi, a grocer, in Mecca, Saudi Arabia. His father described Salem as a quarrelsome teenager who had problems with alcohol and petty theft. However, he stopped drinking and began to attend the mosque about three months before he left his family.

There are reports that he fought in Afghanistan with his brother, Nawaf al-Hazmi, and other reports say the two fought together in Chechnya. Salem al-Hazmi was an al-Qaeda veteran by the time he was selected for participation in the 9/11 attacks. U.S. intelligence learned of al-Hazmi's involvement with al-Qaeda as early as 1999, but he was not placed on any watchlists.

Known as Bilal during the preparations, both he and Ahmed al-Ghamdi flew to Beirut in November 2000, though on separate flights.

== In the United States ==
According to the FBI and the 9/11 Commission report, al-Hazmi first entered the United States on June 29, 2001, although there are numerous unconfirmed reports that he was living in San Antonio, Texas, with fellow hijacker Satam al-Suqami much earlier. Al-Hazmi used the controversial Visa Express program to gain entry into the country.

Al-Hazmi moved to Paterson, New Jersey, where he lived with Hani Hanjour. Both were among the six hijackers who applied for Virginia identification cards at the Arlington office of the Virginia Department of Motor Vehicles on August 1 and 2, 2001.

On August 27, brothers Nawaf and Salem al-Hazmi purchased flight tickets through Travelocity.com using the former's Visa card.

With the four other Flight 77 hijackers, he worked out at a Gold's Gym in Greenbelt, Maryland, from September 2 to September 6 of the same year.

== Attacks ==
Nawaf and Salem at Dulles International Airport on 11 September 2001

On September 11, 2001, al-Hazmi boarded American Airlines Flight 77. Airport surveillance video from Dulles International Airport in Northern Virginia shows two of the five hijackers, including Salem al-Hazmi, being pulled aside to undergo additional scrutiny after setting off metal detectors. Additionally, Salem al-Hazmi got selected for CAPPS because he did not have valid photo identification and he could not understand English.

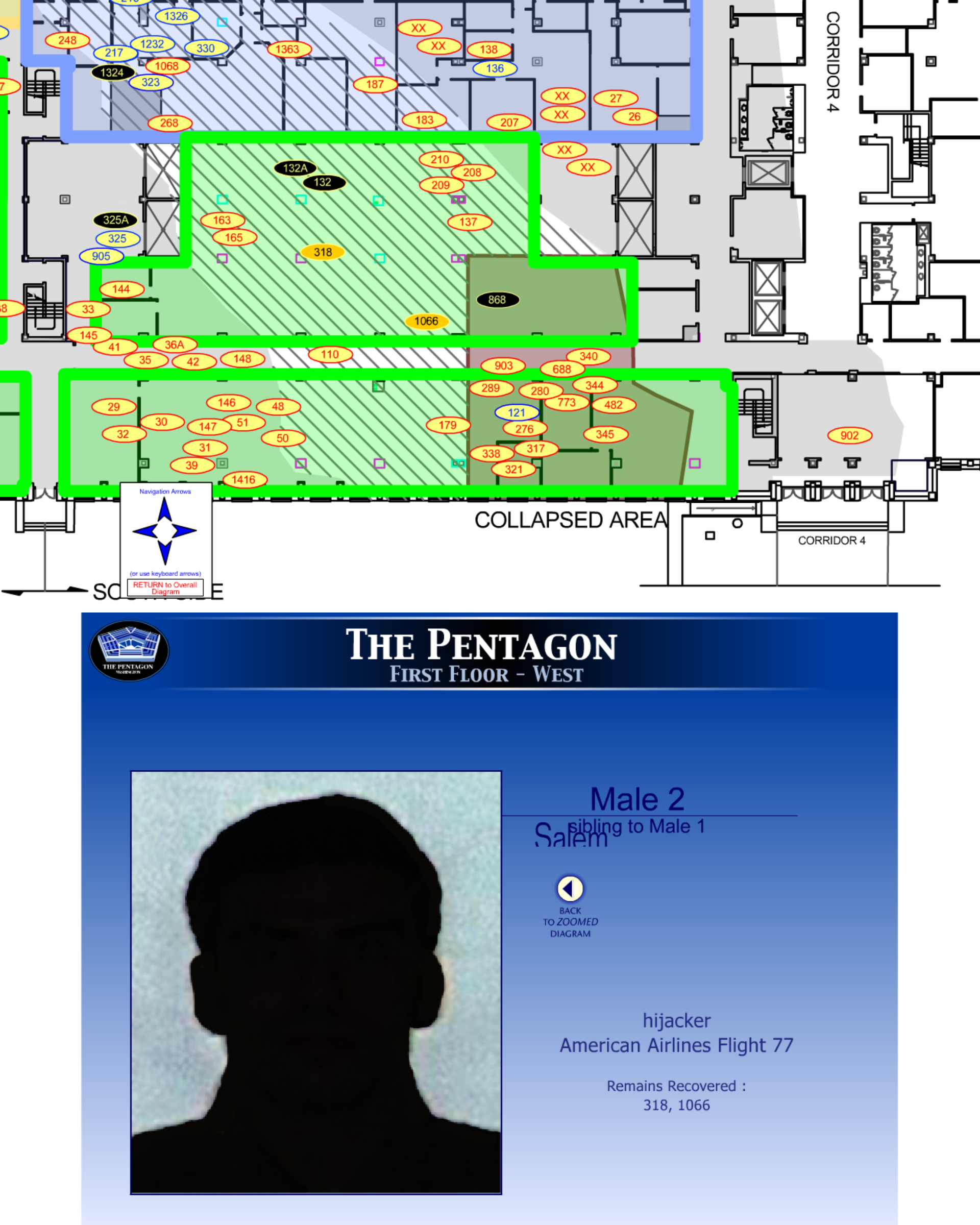
Information about the recovery of al-Hazmi's remains (318 and 1066) from a Moussaoui trial presentation.

The flight was scheduled to depart at 08:10, but ended up departing 10 minutes late from Gate D26 at Dulles. The last normal radio communications from the aircraft to air traffic control occurred at 08:50:51. At 08:54, Flight 77 began to deviate from its normal, assigned flight path and turned south, and then hijackers set the flight's autopilot heading for Washington, D.C. Passenger Barbara Olson called her husband, United States Solicitor General Theodore Olson, and reported that the plane had been hijacked and that the assailants had box cutters and knives. At 09:37, American Airlines Flight 77 crashed into the west facade of the Pentagon, killing all 64 aboard (including the hijackers), along with 125 on the ground in the Pentagon. In the recovery process at the Pentagon, remains of all five Flight 77 hijackers were identified through a process of elimination, as not matching any DNA samples for the victims, and put into custody of the FBI. Forensics teams confirmed that it seemed two of the hijackers were brothers, based on their DNA similarities. al-Hazmi's wallet was found on September 21, 2001, at the Pentagon, Section B, 1st floor South, column 5D. The wallet contained his USA ID Systems New Jersey Photo Identification Card which was not actually a valid form of identification, VISA check card from Hudson United Bank, Gold's Gym membership card which was partially destroyed, the business card of a Guest Service Manager at the Holiday Inn in Wayne, New Jersey, several stuck together checks, various pieces of paper, and three photographs of individuals whose identity the FBI could not determine. His Virginia Identification Card was not found in his wallet.

== Mistaken identity allegations ==
Shortly after the attacks, several sources reported that Salem al-Hazmi, 26, was alive and working at a petrochemical plant in Yanbu, Saudi Arabia. He claimed that his passport had been stolen by a pickpocket in Cairo three years before, and that the pictures and details such as date of birth released to the public by the FBI were his own. He also stated that he had never visited the United States, but volunteered to fly to the U.S. to prove his innocence. On September 19, Al-Sharq Al-Awsat published his photograph alongside Badr al-Hazmi's, who they claimed was the actual hijacker who had stolen his identity.

After some confusion and doubt Saudi Arabia admitted that in fact the names of the hijackers were correct. "The names that we got confirmed that," Interior Minister Prince Nayef said in an interview with The Associated Press. "Their families have been notified." Nayef said the Saudi leadership was shocked to learn 15 of the hijackers were from Saudi Arabia and said it was natural that the kingdom had not noticed their involvement beforehand.

== In popular culture ==
- Yemeni-Canadian actor Sam Al Esai portrayed Salem al-Hazmi in the Canadian TV series Mayday Season 16: Episode 2 (2016) called "9/11: The Pentagon Attack" and Air Crash Investigation Special Report Season 2: Episode 1 (2019) called "Headline News".

== See also ==
- PENTTBOM
- Hijackers in the September 11 attacks
