= Huffman Aviation =

Former flight-training school in Venice, Florida

Huffman Aviation was a flight-training school in Venice, Florida, at Venice Municipal Airport.

== Background ==
Huffman Aviation Florida was established in 1972 as Venice Flying Service, and was reorganized in 1987 and renamed as Huffman Aviation. Huffman Aviation was purchased by Rudi Dekkers in 1999. At the time of purchase, the school had a fleet of 12 small aircraft. Huffman offered private pilot, instrument rating, commercial pilot, multi-engine ratings, and flight instructor training, but did not offer training on larger, jet aircraft.

Dekkers sold Huffman Aviation in 2003.

== Controversies ==
=== 9/11 pilots ===
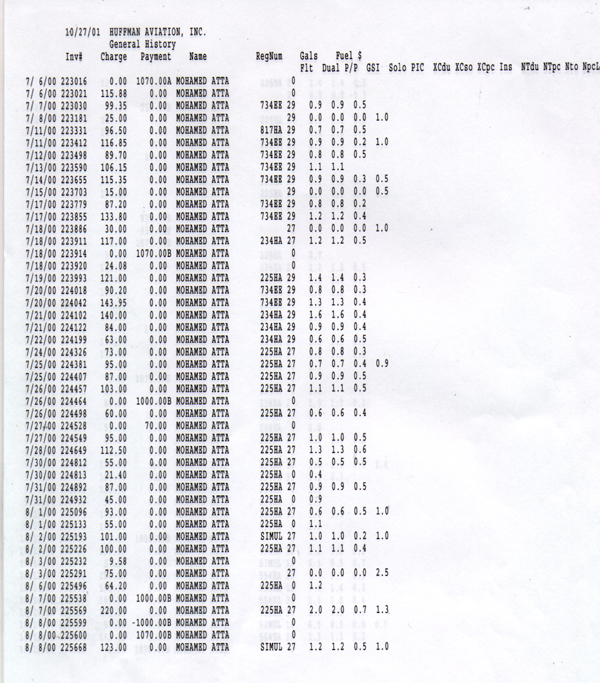
The Huffman Aviation flight log of 9/11 ringleader and hijacker Mohamed Atta

The business gained notoriety after the September 11 attacks, when it was revealed that Mohamed Atta and Marwan al-Shehhi had attended the school to learn how to fly small aircraft.

The two first trained at Huffman in July 2000. In August, the school filed the M-1 student visa request forms for Atta and al-Shehhi to switch from 'tourist' visas, to 'student', in order to allow them to enroll in the school's professional pilot program that would last from September 1, 2000, until September 1 the next year. The student visa requests were granted on July 17, 2001, for Atta, and August 9, 2001, for al-Shehhi.

For a short while, during their time at the school, both al-Shehhi and Atta lived with a company employee named Charlie Voss.

=== Security issues ===
In January 2002, Huffman Aviation again made headlines when the local paper sent a reporter onto its property, who managed to casually move between airplane cockpits, fuel tanks and other "safety concerns" without anybody noticing or stopping him. In March, the school was cited for having left fuel trucks unlocked, with keys in the ignition, at the Venice Municipal Airport.
