= Al Qusaidat =

- Location within United Arab Emirates
- Coordinates: 25°45′49″N 55°58′32″E
- Country: United Arab Emirates
- Emirate: Ras Al Khaimah
- Elevation: 27 m (89 ft)

Al Qusaidat is a suburb of the city of Ras Al Khaimah in the United Arab Emirates (UAE). It is the location of RAK Hospital, as well as the city's Public Works Department.
