= Venice Municipal Airport =

Airport in Florida, U.S.

Coordinates: 27°04′18″N 082°26′25″W

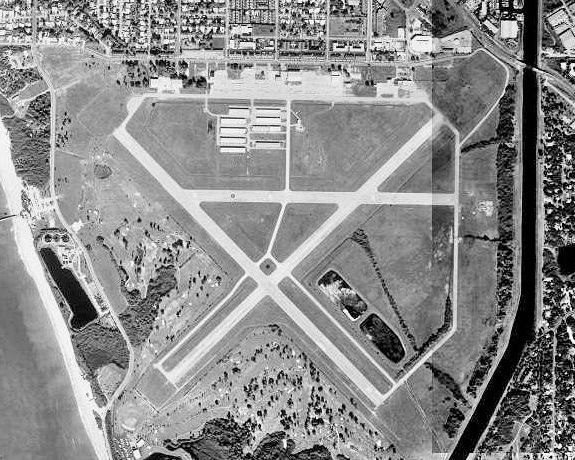
- USGS aerial image, 31 Dec 1998
- IATA: VNC; ICAO: KVNC; FAA LID: VNC

Summary
- Airport type: Public
- Owner: City of Venice
- Serves: Venice, Florida
- Elevation AMSL: 18 ft (5.5 m)
- Website: Venice Municipal Airport

Map
- Location of airport in Florida VNC (the United States)

Runways
Direction	Length		Surface
Direction	ft	m	Surface
5/23	5,000	1,524	Asphalt
13/31	5,640	1,719	Concrete

Statistics (2018)
- Aircraft operations (year ending 10/12/2018): 60,834
- Based aircraft: 197
- Sources: airport web site and FAA

Venice Municipal Airport (IATA: VNC, ICAO: KVNC, FAA LID: VNC) is a city managed public-use airport located two miles (3.2 km) south of the central business district of Venice, a city in Sarasota County, Florida, United States.

== History ==
The airport was built during the 1940s by the United States Army Air Forces and served as a military flight training facility. It also was used by Air Transport Command to deliver US-built aircraft destined for Britain under Lend-lease from the factories on the West Coast or for assignment to selected British pilots. Some of the aircraft were partially disassembled and prepared for being loaded on board ships for the trip across the Atlantic Ocean.

After World War II, the U.S. government gave airport control to the City of Venice, naming the city the airport sponsor through various federal grant assurances.

After the September 11 attacks of 2001, local, state, and national authorities discovered that three of the 9/11 terrorists, Mohamed Atta, Marwan al-Shehhi, and Ziad Jarrah, had all enrolled at the Huffman Aviation flight training school at VNC for general aviation flight training.

== Facilities and aircraft ==
Venice Municipal Airport covers an area of 835 acres (338 ha) which contains two paved runways: 5/23 (asphalt) and 13/31 (concrete), 5/23 measuring 5,000 x 150 ft (1,524 x 46 m) and 13/31 measuring 5,640 x 150 ft (1,719 x 46 m).

For the 12-month period ending October 12, 2018, the airport had 60,834 aircraft operations, an average of 167 per day: 100% general aviation. At that time there were 197 aircraft based at this airport: 173 single-engine, 18 multi-engine, 5 helicopter, and 1 glider.

It is also the base of FFTC (Florida Flight Training Center) that offers pilot training to local and international students. Self-service aviation fuel, as well as aircraft maintenance services are provided by FFM (Florida Flight Maintenance).

Skyport Aviation is the sole fixed-base operator (FBO) and provides ground support and aviation services to aircraft that use the airfield. They offer both Avgas and JetA fuels.

Sarasota Avionics International maintains its headquarters in a 10,000 SF hangar on the northwest side of the airport.

The FBO terminal features one restaurant, Suncoast Cafe, which is open for breakfast and lunch.

AvSky Charters has an office in the FBO terminal and offers private flight services into and out of the airport.

== See also ==
- List of airports in Florida
