= Marwan al-Shehhi =

Emirati terrorist and 9/11 hijacker (1978–2001)

- مروان الشحي
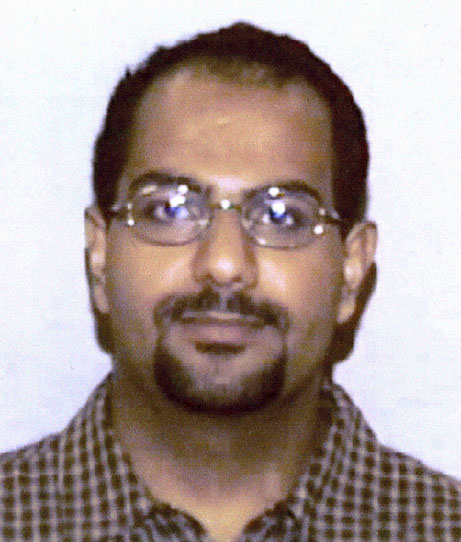
- Al-Shehhi in June 2001
- Born: Marwan Yousef Mohamed Rashid Lekrab al-Shehhi; May 9, 1978; Al Qusaidat, United Arab Emirates
- Died: September 11, 2001 (aged 23); New York City, U.S.
- Cause of death: Suicide by plane crash against the South Tower during the September 11 attacks
- Education: University of Bonn; Hamburg University of Technology
- Organization(s): al-Qaeda; Hamburg cell (1990s–2001)
- Known for: Hijacking United Airlines Flight 175 during the September 11 attacks
- Height: 5 ft 10 in (1.78 m)
- Spouse: Fawzeya al-Shehhi
- Accomplices: Fayez Banihammad, Mohand al-Shehri, Hamza al-Ghamdi, and Ahmed al-Ghamdi

Details
- Date: September 11, 2001; 9:03 a.m. (EDT)
- Country: United States
- State: New York
- Location: Manhattan
- Target: 2 World Trade Center
- Killed: ~1,060 (including the 60 victims of UA 175)
- Injured: 6,000–25,000
- Weapon: Hijacked Boeing 767-222

Signature
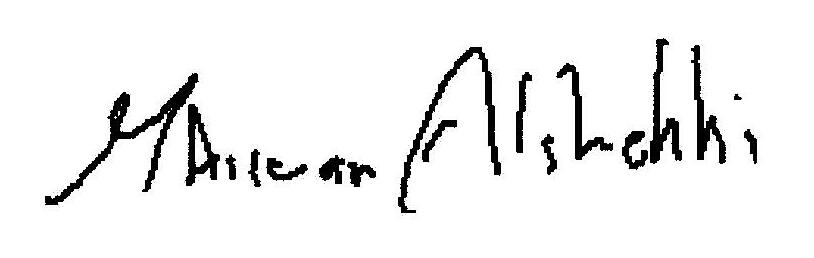

Marwan al-Shehhi (Note: Full name: Marwan Yousef Mohamed Rashid Lekrab al-Shehhi; Arabic: مروان يوسف محمد رشيد لكراب الشحي, romanized: Marwān Yūsuf Muḥammad Rashīd Likrāb al-Shiḥḥī.) (May 9, 1978 – September 11, 2001) was an Emirati engineering student and terrorist hijacker for al-Qaeda. He was the hijacker-pilot on United Airlines Flight 175 (Boeing 767). As part of the September 11 attacks, he crashed the plane into the South Tower of the World Trade Center in a suicide attack. He was one of five hijackers aboard the aircraft and one of two Emiratis to take part in the attacks, the other being Fayez Banihammad, who helped him hijack the same plane.

Al-Shehhi was a university student in applied sciences from the United Arab Emirates. In 1996, at the age of 18, he moved to Germany to pursue his university education. There, he met Mohamed Atta and Ziad Jarrah, who were also studying applied sciences and engineering. Shortly thereafter, Ramzi bin al-Shibh, who provided them with financial support, joined them, and they formed the Hamburg cell. Together, after pledging their lives to martyrdom (Jihad), they became the leaders of the September 11 attacks.

In late 1999, Ramzi bin al-Shibh invited three of them to al-Qaeda training camps in Afghanistan, and they went. They met with Osama bin Laden, who assigned tasks to three members of the Hamburg cell for the attacks in the United States. He arrived in the United States in May 2000, one month before Atta. Atta, al-Shehhi, and Jarrah had been trained as pilots in Florida at Huffman Aviation, receiving their commercial pilot licenses in December 2000 and January 2001 from the FAA.

Al-Shehhi spent his time making preparations for the attack itself, such as meeting with crucial planners abroad, assisting with the arrival of hijackers aboard the other flights, and travelling on surveillance flights determining details on how the hijacking would take place. On September 9, 2001, he traveled from Florida to Boston, where he stayed at the Milner Hotel until September 11. After boarding United Airlines Flight 175 at Logan International Airport, al-Shehhi and 4 other hijackers waited 30 minutes into the flight to make their attack, which then allowed al-Shehhi to take over control as pilot, and at 9:03 am, 17 minutes after Mohamed Atta crashed American Airlines Flight 11 into the North Tower, Al-Shehhi flew the Boeing 767 into the South Tower of the World Trade Center between floors 77 to 85. At 23 years of age, he was the youngest hijacker-pilot to participate in the attacks. The impact of the Boeing 767 into the South Tower was seen live on television around the world as it happened. At 9:59 am, after 56 minutes of burning, the 110-story skyscraper collapsed, killing around 900 between office workers and first responders.

== Early life ==
Marwan Yousef Mohamed Rashid Lekrab al-Shehhi was born on May 9, 1978, in Al Qusaidat, Ras Al Khaimah, United Arab Emirates, the son of an Emirati imam father and an Egyptian mother.

Described as a quiet and devout Muslim, details about al-Shehhi's life in the UAE, however, are difficult to acquire. He was a part of the Shihuh tribe through his father's side. According to an October 2001 article in The New York Times, "If residents of Mr. Shehhi's hometown had heard of him before now, they were certainly not telling strangers. Four hours spent in the community yielded no address and no one – policemen, firemen, pedestrians or local officials – who did anything more than shrug at the mention of his name."

His teacher in Germany, Gabriele Bock, recalls him as someone who seemed to be struggling to have plans for the future while studying there.

While in Germany, al-Shehhi enrolled in the University of Bonn after completing a German course. He left Germany in June 1997 to attend to problems at home although the university forbade him. In early 1998, al-Shehhi transferred to the Technical University of Hamburg. A poor student, al-Shehhi was directed by the Scholarship program administrators to repeat a semester of his studies back in Bonn beginning in August 1998. Al-Shehhi did not enroll back at Bonn until January 1999 and continued to struggle with his studies. By July 1999, Marwan returned to Hamburg to study shipbuilding.

It has been reported al-Shehhi also married in 1999, holding a belated celebration in January 2000, in an arranged marriage by his half-brother with a young woman named Fawzeya.

== Radicalization ==
After moving to Hamburg in 1998, al-Shehhi helped form the Hamburg cell with Mohamed Atta and Ramzi bin al-Shibh. There, his views became more and more radical. They met three or four times a week to discuss anti-American feelings and plot possible attacks.

On October 9, 1999, Marwan al-Shehhi was filmed at Said Bahaji's wedding in Germany with other 9/11 hijackers including Ziad Jarrah.

In late 1999, al-Shehhi, Atta, Ziad Jarrah, Said Bahaji, and Ramzi bin al-Shibh decided to travel to Chechnya to fight against the Russians, but were convinced by Khalid al-Masri and Mohamedou Ould Slahi at the last minute to change their plans. They instead traveled to Afghanistan to meet with Osama bin Laden and trained for terrorist attacks. Immediately afterwards, Atta, al-Shehhi, and Jarrah reported their passports stolen, possibly to erase travel visas to Afghanistan. After their training, the hijackers began to attempt to hide their radicalism. Al-Shehhi shaved his beard and seemed to his old friends like he had become less religious. After the attacks, a librarian in Hamburg reported that al-Shehhi boasted to her "There will be thousands of dead. You will think of me ... You will see, in America something is going to happen. There will be many people killed."

== In the United States ==
=== Flight education and preparation ===
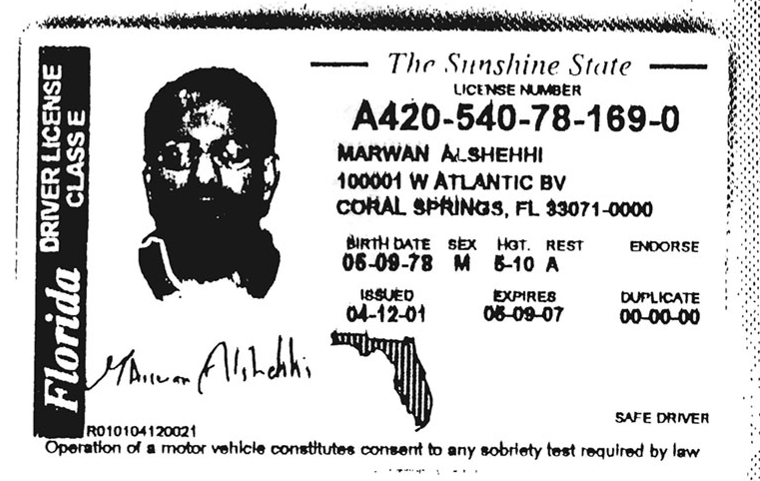
Marwan al-Shehhi's Florida drivers license, which he received on 12 April 2001

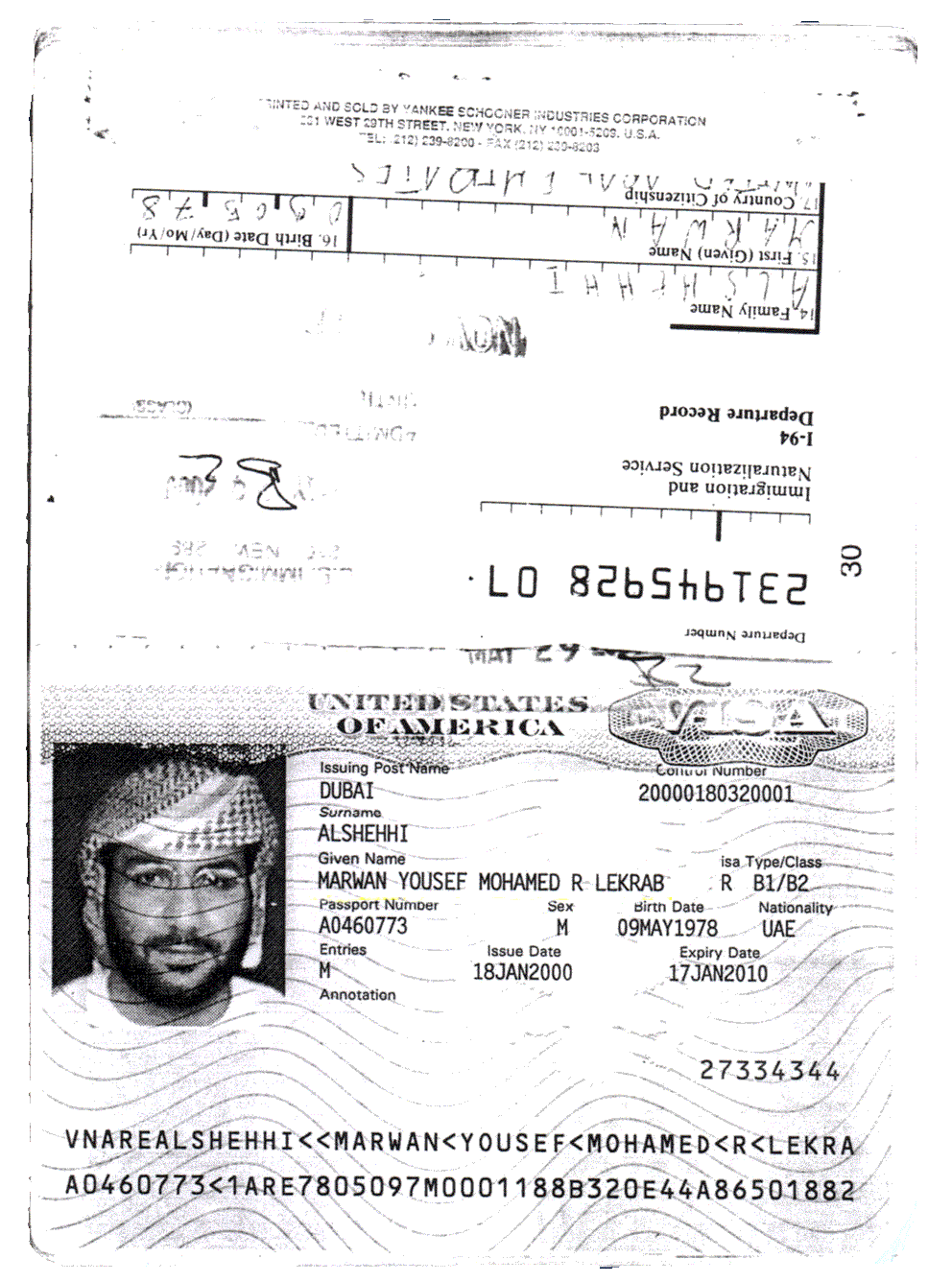
Marwan al-Shehhi's U.S. visa and I-94 card

Al-Shehhi was the first of the Hamburg group to leave for the United States. He arrived in Newark, New Jersey on May 29, 2000. Atta and Jarrah joined him the next month, and the three men began to search for flight schools. Al-Shehhi and Jarrah posed as body guards of Atta, who was posing as a "Saudi Arabian royal family member" while the three of them took flying lessons in Venice, Florida. They logged hundreds of hours on a Boeing 727 flight simulator. They received their licenses by December 2000. Their expenses were paid for by Ali Abdul Aziz Ali. On either December 26 or 27, Atta, Jarrah, and al-Shehhi abandoned a Piper Cherokee that had stalled on the runway of Miami International Airport. On December 31, the trio went to the Opa-Locka Airport and practiced on a Boeing 727 simulator.

=== Travels in early 2001 ===
After completing their flight training, Atta, Jarrah, and al-Shehhi all took foreign trips during the holiday season of 2000–2001. Atta went to Berlin, Germany to coordinate with Ramzi bin al-Shibh about their flight training, Jarrah went to Lebanon and Germany to visit his family and girlfriend, while al-Shehhi went to Morocco then to the United Arab Emirates to visit his wife. After not hearing from al-Shehhi for a long time, his family reported him missing to the government of the UAE. As a response, the embassy in UAE contacted Hamburg to inform the authorities. After learning that his family were concerned for him, al-Shehhi finally called them on 20 January 2001 to assure them that he was okay.

Atta and al-Shehhi both encountered some difficulty reentering the United States on January 10 and 19, respectively. As neither had presented a student visa, both of them had to persuade INS inspectors that they should be admitted so that they could continue their flight training. Neither operative had any problem clearing customs. After returning to Florida from their trips, Atta and al-Shehhi visited Georgia, staying briefly in Norcross and Decatur, and renting a single-engine plane to fly with an instructor in Lawrenceville. By February 19, Atta and al-Shehhi were in Virginia. They had rented a mailbox in Virginia Beach, cashed a check, and then promptly returned to Georgia, staying in Stone Mountain. In mid-March, Ziad Jarrah was in Georgia as well, staying in Decatur. At the end of the month, Jarrah left the United States again and visited Aysel Sengün (his girlfriend) in Germany for two weeks. In early April, Atta and al-Shehhi returned to Virginia Beach and closed the mailbox they had opened in February.

Atta and al-Shehhi returned to Virginia Beach from their travels in Georgia, making their way to a large Dar Al-Hijrah mosque, sometime in early April. They were joined there by 9/11 hijackers Nawaf al-Hazmi and Hani Hanjour who had moved out of San Diego and Arizona after living in or visiting Abdussattar Shaikh's house, where Khalid al-Mihdhar also stayed. The mosque had recently hired the same imam Anwar al-Awlaki with whom al-Hazmi had spent time at the Rabat mosque in San Diego. He remembered al-Hazmi from San Diego but denied having contact with al-Hazmi or Hanjour in Virginia. Atta and al-Shehhi returned to Florida and moved into an apartment in Coral Springs. Atta stayed in Florida, awaiting the arrival of the first muscle hijackers. Al-Shehhi, on the other hand, bought a ticket to Cairo and flew there from Miami on April 18. Al-Shehhi met with Atta's father, who stated in a post-9/11 interview that al-Shehhi wanted to pick up Atta's international driver's license and some money.

Al-Shehhi returned to Miami on May 2. That day, Atta and Jarrah were together, about 30 miles to the north, visiting a Department of Motor Vehicles office in Lauderdale Lakes, Florida, to get Florida driver's licenses. Four days later on May 6, 2001 Atta, Jarrah, and al-Shehhi signed up at the US1 Fitness Center, a gym in Dania Beach, Florida where the men learned how to fight in hand-to-hand combat. Al-Shehhi began to take "surveillance flights" in the summer of 2001, watching the operations of flight crews and making final preparations.

=== August 2001 ===
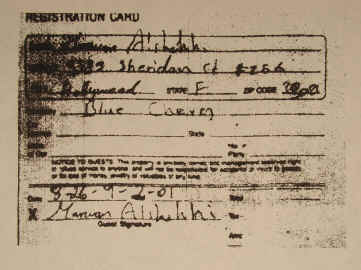
Shehhi's motel registration

On August 26, al-Shehhi signed into the Panther Motel in Deerfield Beach, Florida, paying US$500, saying he wanted to stay until September 2, and listing a Mailboxes Etc. as his permanent address. His register entry indicated that he was driving a blue Chevrolet Malibu, assumed to be the one rented by Atta two weeks prior, and manager Richard Surma said that he bent rules to allow al-Shehhi to have another man as an overnight guest. On 28 August, al-Shehhi went to the Miami International Airport, accompanied by an unknown man, where he purchased his ticket for Flight 175.

== September 11 attacks and death ==
On September 9, al-Shehhi flew from Florida to Boston and stayed in the Milner Hotel where he shared a room with 3 other hijackers, Satam al-Suqami, Fayez Banihammad, and Mohand al-Shehri, and it is also known that on September 10 al-Shehhi had received a phone call from Abdulaziz al-Omari. The call lasted 4 minutes and it remains unknown to authorities as to what the men discussed.

At 5:01 a.m. on the morning of September 11, al-Shehhi in Boston received a phone call from Flight 93 hijacker pilot Ziad Jarrah in Newark. The call would be the last time Jarrah and al-Shehhi spoke and is believed by authorities to be the two confirming to one another that the attacks were ready to begin.

After arriving at Logan International Airport later that morning, al-Shehhi made a call to Mohamed Atta lasting from 6:52 to 6:55, who was elsewhere in the same airport as both American 11 and United 175 were to fly from Logan to Los Angeles International Airport. The call is believed to have served the same purpose as al-Shehhi's earlier call to Jarrah.

Between 7:23 AM and 7:28 AM, the five hijackers each boarded the plane, with al-Shehhi taking his seat in 6C. The plane became airborne at 8:14, only to be hijacked 28 minutes after takeoff. The terrorists gained access to the cockpit through unknown means and murdered both pilots, allowing al-Shehhi to assume control of the flight. Shortly after the hijacking, the plane came close to colliding with another aircraft in the vicinity, Delta Air Lines Flight 2315. Approaching New York City, al-Shehhi saw smoke and fire pouring southeast from the World Trade Center's North Tower after it was struck by Flight 11 at 8:46 am, and narrowly avoided a second mid-air collision with Midwest Express Flight 7. Flying at speeds of around 590 mph (510 kn; 260 m/s; 950 km/h) (Note: Sources disagree on the exact speed of impact. NTSB study in 2002 concluded around 515 mph (448 kn; 230 m/s; 829 km/h), whereas MIT study concluded 503 mph (437 kn; 225 m/s; 810 km/h).) while carrying approximately 9,100 gallons (approximately 34,447 liters) of jet fuel, al-Shehhi crashed the plane into the South Tower at 9:03:02 am (Note: The exact time is disputed. The 9/11 Commission report says 9:03:11, NIST reports 9:02:59, some other sources report 9:03:02.) between floors 77 and 85, instantly killing himself and everyone else aboard the flight in addition to many more inside the South Tower. More than 600 people were above the impact zone when the plane struck, half of whom were killed instantaneously. Thus, the estimated 300 people still alive following the impact were left stranded in the upper floors of the catastrophically damaged skyscraper, now set ablaze and rapidly filling with smoke. Because all eyes were on the Twin Towers following the crash of Flight 11 seventeen minutes earlier, the impact of Flight 175 and the explosion that followed was seen by millions of people worldwide on live television, being filmed and photographed from numerous vantage points. Although the angle at which al-Shehhi crashed did not sever all means of escape from the impact zone, most of the people who survived the crash were unable to use the single intact stairwell before the tower fell 56 minutes later at 9:59 AM.

Al-Shehhi flew the plane faster and lower into the tower than Atta did, into the eastern half of the South Tower's southern facade close to the southeast corner, causing the tower's structural integrity to be compromised far more severely than the North Tower's. At 9:59 AM, the South Tower became the first tower to collapse, having stood for almost an hour (Note: NIST and the 9/11 Commission both give the time as 9:58:59 am, which is subsequently rounded to 9:59 for simplicity.) after the plane crash.

== See also ==
- Hijackers in the 11 September attacks
- PENTTBOM – FBI probe into the 9/11 attacks

== Sources ==
- Thompson, Paul. The Terror Timeline. ReganBooks, 2004. ISBN 0-06-078338-9
- The 9/11 Commission Report. W.W. Norton & Company. ISBN 0-393-32671-3
