= Trials related to the September 11 attacks =

This page lists trials related to the September 11 attacks.

== Zacarias Moussaoui ==
Zacarias Moussaoui was in jail in Minnesota when the September 11 attacks unfolded. On December 11, 2001, Moussaoui was indicted by a federal grand jury in United States District Court for the Eastern District of Virginia on six federal charges: conspiracy to commit acts of terrorism transcending national boundaries, conspiracy to commit aircraft piracy, conspiracy to destroy aircraft, conspiracy to use weapons of mass destruction, conspiracy to murder United States employees, and conspiracy to destroy property. The indictment of Zacarias Moussaoui named as unindicted co-conspirators Ramzi Bin al-Shibh and Mustafa al-Hawsawi, among others, for their role in the attack "to murder thousands of innocent people in New York, Virginia and Pennsylvania."

On January 12, 2002, Moussaoui refused to enter any plea to the charges and so Judge Leonie Brinkema entered pleas of not guilty. A hearing was held on April 22, 2002, to determine his right to self-representation, for by then Moussaoui had declined the assistance of his court-appointed attorneys, and asked to defend himself. At another hearing on June 13, 2002, Brinkema deemed him competent to defend himself and allowed the case to move forward. However, Moussaoui later requested the occasional assistance of attorneys to help him with technical issues.

Moussaoui admitted his involvement with al-Qaeda, but claimed he was not involved in the 9/11 attacks. Rather, he claimed that he was preparing for a separate attack. Khalid Sheikh Mohammed had earlier told investigators that Moussaoui met with him prior to September 11, but that he, Mohammed, chose not to use him. No evidence directly linking Moussaoui to the 9/11 attacks has yet been released.

The trial highlighted a tension in the United States between the judiciary and national security. Moussaoui made requests for access to confidential documents and the right to call captive al-Qaeda members as witnesses, notably bin al-Shibh, Khalid Shaikh Mohammed, and Mustafa Ahmed al-Hawsawi. Both requests were claimed by prosecutors to be potential threats to national security. Brinkema denied the motion to access confidential documents, although Moussaoui was permitted to use several al-Qaeda prisoners as witnesses.

Brinkema put the death penalty "off limits " on October 2, 2003, in reply to government defiance of her order to provide access to Moussaoui's witnesses. The Fourth Circuit Court of Appeals reversed the Brinkema ruling, holding that the US government could use summaries of interviews/interrogations of these witnesses. On March 21, 2005, the United States Supreme Court, without comment, declined to hear Moussaoui's pre-trial appeal of the Fourth Circuit's decision, returning the case to Brinkema.

On April 22, 2005, in one of the court sessions near the end of that phase of the proceedings, Moussaoui surprised the whole audience by pleading guilty to all charges, while at the same time denying having any intention to produce a massacre like 9/11. He said that it was not his conspiracy, and that he intended to free Sheikh Omar Abdel-Rahman. According to Moussaoui, his master plan was to hijack a Boeing 747-400, since the plane is one of a few that could reach Afghanistan from the US without any intermediate stops.

On February 6, 2006, Moussaoui shouted "I am al-Qaeda. They do not represent me; they are Americans," referring to his attorneys while being escorted from the courtroom in front of 120 potential jurors.

In March 2006, during the Moussaoui trial, several premises made headlines, including FBI agents stating that the bureau was aware, years before the attacks in 2001, that al-Qaeda planned to use planes to destroy important buildings, and Brinkema's decision to consider dismissal of the death penalty. Brinkema announced her decision in response to a violation by the attorney for the Transportation Security Administration, Carla Martin, of a pretrial order barring witnesses from exposure to any opening statements or trial testimony. Martin had e-mailed seven Federal Aviation Administration officials describing opening statements of the prosecution and commentary on government witnesses from the start of the testimony, effectively 'coaching the witnesses'. Brinkema said, "In all the years I've been on the bench, I have never seen such an egregious violation of a rule on witnesses," and described the situation as a "significant error by the government affecting the... integrity of the criminal justice system of the United States in the context of a death case." However, days later, under significant media attention, Brinkema decided not to dismiss the case, and instead ruled that witnesses could not testify and the government would be allowed to continue to seek the death penalty.

On March 27, 2006, Moussaoui testified that he and "shoe bomber" Richard Reid had planned to crash a hijacked airplane into the White House in the September 11 attacks. No direct connection between Moussaoui and Reid had ever before been alleged, and this testimony contradicted earlier testimony by Moussaoui that he had been intended for an operation after September 11. When asked why he had previously lied, he stated that "You're allowed to lie for jihad. You're allowed any technique to defeat your enemy." There has been commentary in the mainstream media that Moussaoui's preference to die as an identified 9/11 plotter rather than receive a life sentence as a member of an unrealized scheme throws doubt on his self-admitted connection to 9/11.

Since Moussaoui was in jail in Minnesota when the September 11 attacks unfolded in seeking a death sentence, prosecutors were required to prove that he "intentionally participated in an act... and the victim died as a direct result of the act." Moussaoui admitted he knew about the attacks and did nothing to stop them.

Having entered a guilty plea, Moussaoui was eligible for the death penalty. Germany said it would not release evidence against Moussaoui unless the US promised not to seek death as punishment. On April 27, 2005, French Justice Minister Dominique Perben said, "When France gave elements of information about Mr Moussaoui to the American justice, I obtained a written engagement of the United States not to use these elements to require or execute the death penalty."

On March 13, 2006, Brinkema recessed the death-penalty case against Moussaoui because of a breach against the rules on witnesses. Seven FAA officials were previously sent emails by TSA attorney Carla Martin outlining the prosecution's opening statements and providing commentary on government witnesses from the first day of testimony. Martin was placed on administrative leave over the incident and may face contempt of court charges. On March 14, 2006, Brinkema ruled that the prosecution could continue to seek the death penalty against Moussaoui, but could not use key witnesses coached by Martin. On April 3, 2006, the jury in his case decided that Moussaoui was eligible for the death penalty.

At Moussaoui's sentencing trial, FBI agent Greg Jones testified that prior to the attacks, he urged his supervisor, Michael Maltbie, "to prevent Zacarias Moussaoui from flying a plane into the World Trade Center." Maltbie had refused to act on 70 requests from another agent, Harry Samit, to obtain a warrant to search Moussaoui's computer.

On May 3, 2006, the jury reached a verdict: that Moussaoui be sentenced to life in prison without the possibility of parole. Moussaoui was sentenced to six consecutive life terms on May 4, as Judge Brinkema expressed her belief that the sentence was an appropriate one, inasmuch as it would deprive Moussaoui of "martyrdom in a great big bang of glory" and of the "chance to speak again", after Moussaoui entered the courtroom proclaiming his victory and asserting that the United States would "never get Osama bin Laden". As he was leaving the courtroom he said, "America, you lost and I won." And he clapped his hands twice. A single juror saved Moussaoui from death. The foreman of the 12-person federal jury told The Washington Post that the panel voted 11–1, 10–2 and 10–2 in favor of the death penalty on the three charges for which Moussaoui was eligible for execution. A unanimous vote on any one of the three terrorism charges was required to return a death sentence.

On May 8, 2006, Moussaoui filed papers with the federal court in Alexandria, Virginia requesting to withdraw his guilty plea, stating that his earlier claim of participation in the September 11 plot was a "complete fabrication." He said that he was "extremely surprised" that he was not sentenced to death. "I now see that it is possible that I can receive a fair trial even with Americans as jurors," he said. However, federal sentencing rules forbid pleas to be withdrawn after a sentence has already been executed, and Moussaoui had already waived his rights to appeal.

On May 13, 2006, a group of US marshals ordered Moussaoui out of his holding cell in Alexandria, Virginia, and flew him, via Conair, from Virginia to Colorado to begin serving his sentence at the supermax United States Penitentiary Administrative Maximum Facility, located in Florence, Colorado. The facility - considered the most secure federal penitentiary—is called the "Alcatraz of the Rockies". He is federal prisoner number 51427-054.

On July 31, 2006, the 1,202 exhibits presented during the case of United States v. Zacarias Moussaoui were posted online, marking the first time the exhibits of a criminal case in US courts were so published.

On November 20, 2007, Judge Brinkema publicly stated that the US government had provided incorrect information about evidence in the Moussaoui trial and that due to those actions, she was considering ordering a new trial in a related terrorism case, that of Ali al-Timimi, a Virginia Muslim cleric. Brinkema said that she could no longer trust the CIA and other government agencies on how they represent classified evidence in terror cases after Moussaoui case prosecutors admitted that the CIA had assured her that no videotapes or audiotapes existed of interrogations of certain high-profile terrorism detainees, but later, in a letter made public Nov. 13, two such videotapes and one audio tape were made known.

== Mounir el-Motassadeq ==
Mounir el-Motassadeq, a Moroccan living in Germany who belonged to the Hamburg cell apartment owned by Mohamed Atta and lived in by many other people who would later go on to lead the September 11, 2001, attacks, in February 2003 was convicted in Germany of over 3,000 counts of accessory to murder in direct relation to the September 11 attacks, but the conviction was rejected on appeal. Though the German Justice Ministry pressed the United States to allow Ramzi bin al-Shibh to testify, the US refused, and the verdict and sentence were set aside.

Motassadeq was re-tried and convicted on August 19, 2005, of "membership in a "terrorist organization". That conviction was also rejected in appeal.

On February 7, 2006, Germany's Federal Constitutional Court ordered an early release of Motassadeq. The highest court of Germany ruled there was an absence of proof that Motassadeq was informed about the September 11 terrorist plot.

On November 15, 2006, the German Federal Supreme Court ruled on the appeals: They considered the evidence as sufficient to prove that Motassadeq knew about and was involved in the preparation of the plan to hijack the planes and is hence guilty of accessory in 246 counts of murder. This is the number of victims that died in the planes but does not include the victims on ground. The Oberlandesgericht (state supreme court) in Hamburg then took up the trial again in order to decide on the sentencing. Two days later, the Federal Supreme Court also revoked the release order and Motassadeq was arrested again. On January 8, 2007, he was sentenced by the Oberlandesgericht Hamburg to 15 years in prison, the maximum sentence possible under German law. The Federal Constitutional Court of Germany did not accept to revise his case. On May 2 the Federal Court of Justice of Germany rejected a plea for revision. His lawyers are currently thinking about both calling upon the European Court of Human Rights and trying to get the case reopened - his two ultimate legal choices left.

== Khalid Sheikh Mohammed, Ramzi bin al-Shibh, Mustafa Ahmad al-Hawsawi, Ali Abd al-Aziz Ali and Walid Bin Attash ==
On February 11, 2008, US Department of Defense charged Khalid Sheikh Mohammed as well as Ramzi bin al-Shibh, Mustafa Ahmad al-Hawsawi, Ali Abd al-Aziz Ali and Walid Bin Attash for the September 11 attacks under the military commission system, as established under the Military Commissions Act of 2006.

These individuals were arrested in 2002–2003 in Pakistan and held by CIA in undisclosed locations.

On September 6, 2006, American President George W. Bush confirmed, for the first time, that the CIA had held "high-value detainees" in secret interrogation centers. He also announced that fourteen senior captives, including Khalid Sheikh Mohammed, were being transferred from CIA custody, to military custody, at Guantanamo Bay and that these fourteen captives could now expect to face charges before Guantanamo military commissions.

In a September 29, 2006, speech, President Bush stated "Once captured, Abu Zubaydah, Ramzi bin al-Shibh, and Khalid Sheikh Mohammed were taken into custody of the Central Intelligence Agency. The questioning of these and other suspected terrorists provided information that helped us protect the American people. They helped us break up a cell of Southeast Asian terrorist operatives that had been groomed for attacks inside the United States. They helped us disrupt an al Qaeda operation to develop anthrax for terrorist attacks. They helped us stop a planned strike on a US Marine camp in Djibouti, and to prevent a planned attack on the US Consulate in Karachi, and to foil a plot to hijack passenger planes and to fly them into Heathrow Airport and London's Canary Wharf."

In March 2007, Mohammed testified before a closed-door hearing in Guantanamo Bay. According to transcripts of the hearing released by the Pentagon, he said "I was responsible for the 9/11 operation, from A to Z." The transcripts also show him confessing to: organizing the 1993 World Trade Center bombing; the Bali nightclub bombings; and Richard Reid's attempted shoe bombing. He also confessed to planning attacks on Heathrow Airport and Big Ben clock tower in London, Pearl's murder in 2002, and planned assassination attempts on Pope John Paul II, Pervez Musharraf and Bill Clinton.

Following the case's transfer back to the military commission, the Department of Defense announced, on May 31, 2011, capital charges have been re-filed against Khalid Sheikh Mohammed, Ramzi bin al-Shibh, Mustafa Ahmad al-Hawsawi, Ali Abd al-Aziz Ali and Walid Bin Attash. The defendants are charged with the following offenses: 1.conspiracy, 2.murder in violation of the law of war, 3.attacking civilians, 4.attacking civilian objects, 5.intentionally causing serious bodily injury, 6.destruction of property in violation of the law of war, 7.hijacking aircraft, and 8.terrorism. The charges against them list 167 overt acts allegedly committed by the defendants in furtherance of the September 11 events". The charges include 2,973 individual counts of murder—one for each person killed in the 9/11 attacks.The defendants were arraigned at Guantanamo Bay on May 5, 2012.

The US government is seeking the death penalty, which would require the unanimous agreement of the commission judges.

=== Guilty plea ===
On December 8, 2008, Khalid Sheikh Mohammed and his four co-defendants told the judge stating that they wished to confess and plead guilty to all charges. The plea will be delayed until mental competency hearings for Mustafa Ahmad al-Hawsawi and Ramzi bin al-Shibh can be held; Mohammed said, "We want everyone to plead together." Spencer Ackerman, writing in the Washington Independent, reported that Presiding Officer Stephen Henley had to consider whether he was authorized to accept guilty pleas.

On 31 July 2024, Mohammed, Attash, and Al-Hawsawi agreed to plead guilty.

=== Transfer of the case to a civilian court ===
On 13 November 2009 US Attorney General Eric Holder announced that Khalid Sheikh Mohammed, Ramzi Bin al-Shibh, Walid bin Attash, Ali Abdul Aziz Ali and Mustafa Ahmed al-Hawsawi will all be transferred to the U.S. District Court for the Southern District of New York for trial. He also expressed confidence that an impartial jury would be found "to ensure a fair trial in New York."

On 21 January 2010 all charges have been withdrawn in the military commissions against the five suspects in the Sept. 11, 2001 terror attacks being held at Guantanamo Bay. The charges were dropped "without prejudice" - a procedural move that allows federal officials to transfer the men to trial in a civilian court and also leaves the door open, if necessary, to bring charges again in military commissions.

In February 2010 Fox News reported that the legal counsel of Khalid Sheikh Mohammed, and the legal counsel of several other captives, was halted without warning. The attorneys had made the trip to Guantanamo in the usual manner—a trip that requires advising authorities of the purpose of their trip. However, upon their arrival in Guantanamo, they were informed they were no longer allowed to see their clients. They were told that letters to their clients, telling them that they had traveled to Cuba, to see them, could not be delivered, as they were no longer authorized to write to their clients. Camp authorities told them that since the charges against their clients had been dropped, while the Department of Justice figured out where to charge them, they no longer needed legal counsel. Camp authorities told them that, henceforward, all access to the captives had to be approved by Jeh Johnson, the Department of Defense's General Counsel. Fox reported that during earlier periods when the charges had been dropped the captives had still been allowed to see their attorneys. Fox claimed that questions they asked camp authorities lead to the captives' access to their attorneys being restored.

=== Transfer of the case back to a military commission ===
On 7 January 2011 US President Barack Obama signed National Defense Authorization Act which explicitly prohibits the use of US Defense Department funds to transfer detainees from Guantanamo Bay to the United States or other countries. It also bars Pentagon funds from being used to build facilities in the United States to house detainees, as the president originally suggested. The move essentially barred the administration from trying detainees in civilian courts. The president objected to the provision in the bill before signing it, calling it "a dangerous and unprecedented challenge to critical executive branch authority" but also said his team would work with the US Congress to "seek repeal of these restrictions."

On 4 April 2011 Attorney General Eric Holder announced that Khalid Sheikh Mohammed and four other 9/11 terror suspects will face a military trial at the Guantanamo Bay detention facility. In announcing his decision, Holder blasted Congress for imposing restrictions on the Justice Department's ability to bring the men to New York City for civilian trials. "After thoroughly studying the case, it became clear to me that the best venue for prosecution was in federal court. I stand by that decision today," Holder said. "As the president has said, those unwise and unwarranted restrictions (imposed by Congress) undermine our counter-terrorism efforts and could harm our national security. Decisions about who, where and how to prosecute have always been - and must remain - the responsibility of the executive branch." Holder insisted, "We were prepared to bring a powerful case against Khalid Sheikh Mohammed and his four co-conspirators - one of the most well-researched and documented cases I have ever seen in my decades of experience as a prosecutor." He added, "Had this case proceeded in Manhattan or in an alternative venue in the United States, as I seriously explored in the past year, I am confident that our justice system would have performed with the same distinction that has been its hallmark for over 200 years." Holder had promised to seek the death penalty for each of the five men and on 4 April he warned that it is an "open question" if such a penalty can be imposed by a military commission if the defendants plead guilty.
