= Zacarias Moussaoui =

French al-Qaeda terrorist (born 1968)

- زكريا موسوي
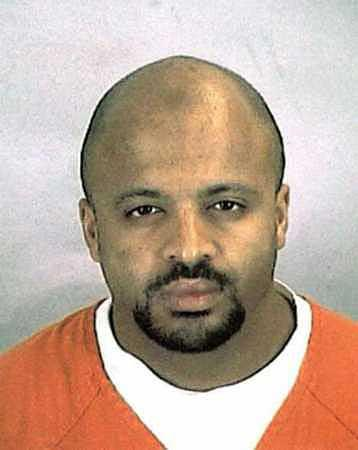
- Mugshot of Moussaoui, 2006
- Born: 30 May 1968 (age 58); Saint-Jean-de-Luz, France
- Other name: Abu Khaled al-Sahrawi
- Organization: Al-Qaeda
- Known for: Potential involvement in the September 11 attacks
- Status: Incarcerated
- Motive: Anti-Imperialism, Anti-Americanism, Anti-Zionism, Islamic extremism
- Penalty: 6 consecutive life sentences without the possibility of parole

Details
- Imprisoned at: ADX Florence

Zacarias Moussaoui (Arabic: زكريا موسوي, Zakariyyā Mūsawī; born 30 May 1968) is a French terrorist who was a member of the al-Qaeda militant organization. He likely planned to participate in the September 11 attacks (9/11) in 2001, in which 19 members of al-Qaeda hijacked four American airliners in an attempt to crash them into U.S. landmarks.

Many of the hijackers went to flight schools in the U.S. in the lead-up to the attacks. In August 2001, while Moussaoui attended one in Minnesota, he aroused suspicion and was arrested by the FBI for violating immigration laws. In December, he was indicted by a federal grand jury on six felony charges relating to the attacks.

Prosecutors alleged Moussaoui was going to be al-Qaeda's "20th hijacker", after Ramzi bin al-Shibh and Zakariya Essabar were denied visas to enter the US. Legal analysts viewed his trial as a barometer of America's ability to give a fair hearing to terrorism suspects after 9/11. Moussaoui argued he was not involved in the attacks, but instead had been planning a similar attack of his own. Some al-Qaeda members reportedly corroborated his defense, but prosecutors believed it had no merit.

In May 2006, Moussaoui was sentenced to life in prison without the possibility of parole. The jurors voted against him receiving the death penalty, citing his unstable childhood and possible ignorance of al-Qaeda's plans. He is currently held at the ADX Florence federal supermax prison in Colorado, and remains the only person ever convicted in an American civilian court of a crime in connection with 9/11.

== Early life ==
Aicha el-Wafi, Moussaoui's mother, was 14 when she was married to a man that she did not previously know, in Morocco. Five years later, Moussaoui's parents moved to France, where he was born. After enduring domestic violence, his mother left his father Omar while her four children were still young. She raised her children on a cleaner's wages. There was no religious education within the family. Witnesses testified at Moussaui's trial that, as first-generation immigrants from Morocco, the family frequently faced racism in their new country. From 1982, Moussaoui, his brother and sisters, were brought up in a bungalow on the edge of the town of Narbonne. His mother has said that she believes two 'wounding' incidents in his French adolescence contributed to the formation of an extremist sensibility: the first the day that his school careers adviser pushed him towards minor, technical studies, with "the clear implication that he was only an Arab and would need nothing more," and the second the day that the father of his teenage sweetheart warned him off because he was an Arab. "'Don't think that you will ever get your feet under my table', the man said."

According to his brother, Abd Samad Moussaoui, Zacarias loved to play handball:

For Zacarias [his brother wrote in the Guardian], handball quickly became more than a sport—it was his passion. He was brilliant. Everyone recognized it—his trainers, his team-mates, even his opponents. For Zacarias, the future was all mapped out. He would study and play sports.

== Militant training ==
Moussaoui has been known by other names, reportedly including Abu Khaled al Sahrawi and Shaquil while he was in Oklahoma. He holds a master's degree in International Business from South Bank University in London, having enrolled in 1993 and graduated in 1995. He attended, amongst others, the Brixton Mosque, where he may have met Richard Reid, the future shoe bomber. He was proselytised by groups such as al-Muhajiroun ("the Emigrants"), who leafleted people attending moderate mosques such as that in Brixton. It is possible that he had connections with members of the Finsbury Park mosque, where the extremist Abu Hamza al-Masri taught.

French authorities began monitoring Moussaoui in 1996 when they observed him with Islamic extremists in London. In 1998, he attended the Khalden training camp in Afghanistan, allegedly returning the next year as well. In September 2000, he visited Malaysia and stayed in a condominium owned by Yazid Sufaat who, in October 2000, signed letters identifying Moussaoui as a representative of his company. Two of 11 September hijackers lived in the same condominium in January 2000. Jemaah Islamiah leader Riduan Ismauddin sent Sufaat to provide Moussaoui with US$35,000 and travel documents in Malaysia in October.

== Flight training ==
From 26 February to 29 May 2001, Moussaoui attended flight training courses at Airman Flight School in Norman, Oklahoma. Despite 57 hours of flying lessons, he failed and left without ever having flown solo. This school was also visited by Mohamed Atta and Marwan al-Shehhi, who piloted planes into the North and South Towers of the World Trade Center.

During his time in Norman, Moussaoui had a roommate named Hussein al-Attas. On 11 August 2001, Hussein al-Attas drove Moussaoui to Minnesota from Oklahoma. Hussein al-Attas said that he and Moussaoui planned to take a trip to New York City in late August/early September 2001. In 2002, al-Attas admitted that he lied to the FBI to conceal

- Moussaoui's name, extremist jihadi and anti-American beliefs, and his efforts to radicalize al-Attas;
- his (al-Attas's) own radical tendencies; and
- the names of other Middle Easterners who were taking flight lessons in Oklahoma.

Moussaoui allegedly received US$14,000 in wire transfers from bin al-Shibh, originating from Düsseldorf and Hamburg, Germany, in early August. This money could have helped him pay for flight training he took about two weeks later at Pan-Am International Flight Academy in Eagan, Minnesota. On 13 August, Moussaoui paid US$6,800 with US$100 bills to receive training in a 747-400 simulator. Moussaoui was reportedly considered as a replacement for Ziad Jarrah, who at one point threatened to withdraw from the scheme because of tensions amongst the plotters. Plans to include Moussaoui were never completed because the al-Qaeda hierarchy allegedly had doubts about his reliability.

Clarence Prevost, the flight instructor assigned to Moussaoui, began to have suspicions about his student. His behavior largely resembled that of other seemingly wealthy men who had come to the center in the past to receive jumbo jet training despite the fact that they would likely never use it, but some characteristics were unusual. Prevost said later that in pre-simulator instruction, Moussaoui would ask questions that had the right jargon but were otherwise nonsensical. Moussaoui read through the 747 training manuals, but had a lack of understanding of the plane's systems. Prevost was confused as to why Moussaoui would seek simulator time if he lacked basic plane knowledge. After some convincing, his supervisors contacted the FBI, who came to meet with him. (Despite later reports, Moussaoui did not skip the training for takeoff and landing).

=== Capture ===
On 16 August 2001, Moussaoui was arrested by Harry Samit of the FBI and INS agents in Minnesota and charged with an immigration violation. Materials itemized when he was arrested included a laptop computer, two knives, flight manuals pertaining to Boeing's 747 aircraft, a flight simulator computer program, fighting gloves and shin guards, and a computer disk with information about crop dusting.

Some agents worried that his flight training had violent intentions, so the Minnesota bureau tried to get permission (sending over 70 emails in a week) to search his laptop, but they were turned down. FBI agent Coleen Rowley made an explicit request for permission to search Moussaoui's personal rooms. This request was first denied by her superior, Deputy General Counsel Marion "Spike" Bowman, and later rejected based upon FISA regulations (amended after 9/11 by the USA Patriot Act). Several further search attempts similarly failed.

Ahmed Ressam, the captured al-Qaeda Millennium Bomber, was at the time sharing information with the US authorities, in an effort to gain leniency in his sentencing. One person whom he was not asked about until after 9/11, but whom he was able to identify when asked as having trained with him at al-Qaeda's Khalden Camp in Afghanistan, was Moussaoui. The 9/11 Commission Report opined that had Ressam been asked about Moussaoui, he would have broken the FBI's logjam. Had that happened, the report opined, the U.S. might conceivably have disrupted or derailed the 9/11 attacks altogether.

On 24 January 2008, Clarence Prevost, the flight instructor who led authorities to Moussaoui, received a $5 million reward from the U.S. government. The payment was questioned by agent Coleen Rowley and Senators Amy Klobuchar and Norm Coleman, among others, on the basis that two other flight instructors had made the initial calls to the FBI.

== Court proceedings ==
On 11 December 2001, Moussaoui was indicted by a federal grand jury in United States District Court for the Eastern District of Virginia on six felony charges: conspiracy to commit acts of terrorism transcending national boundaries (18 u.s.c 2332b), conspiracy to commit aircraft piracy (49 u.s.c 46502) , conspiracy to destroy aircraft, conspiracy to use weapons of mass destruction (18 u.s.c 2332a), conspiracy to murder United States employees, and conspiracy to destroy property. The indictment of Zacarias Moussaoui named as unindicted co-conspirators Ramzi Bin al-Shibh and Mustafa al-Hawsawi, among others, for their role in the attack "to murder thousands of innocent people in New York, Virginia and Pennsylvania".

On 2 January 2002, Moussaoui refused to enter any plea to the charges and so Judge Leonie Brinkema entered pleas of not guilty. A hearing was held on 22 April 2002, to determine his right to self-representation, for by then Moussaoui had declined the assistance of his court-appointed attorneys, and asked to defend himself. At another hearing on 13 June 2002, Brinkema deemed him competent to defend himself and allowed the case to move forward. However, Moussaoui later requested the occasional assistance of attorneys to help him with technical issues.

Moussaoui admitted his involvement with al-Qaeda, but claimed he was not involved in the 9/11 attacks. Rather, he claimed that he was preparing for a separate attack. Khalid Sheikh Mohammed had earlier told investigators that Moussaoui met with him prior to 11 September, but that he, Mohammed, chose not to use him. No evidence directly linking Moussaoui to the 9/11 attacks has yet been released.

The trial highlighted a tension in the United States between the judiciary and national security. Moussaoui made requests for access to confidential documents and the right to call captive al-Qaeda members as witnesses, notably bin al-Shibh, Khalid Shaikh Mohammed, and Mustafa Ahmed al-Hawsawi. Both requests were claimed by prosecutors to be potential threats to national security. Brinkema denied the motion to access confidential documents, although Moussaoui was permitted to use several al-Qaeda prisoners as witnesses.

Brinkema put the death penalty "off limits" on 2 October 2003, in reply to government defiance of her order to provide access to Moussaoui's witnesses. The Fourth Circuit Court of Appeals reversed the Brinkema ruling, holding that the U.S. government could use summaries of interviews/interrogations of these witnesses. On 21 March 2005, the United States Supreme Court, without comment, declined to hear Moussaoui's pre-trial appeal of the Fourth Circuit's decision, returning the case to Brinkema.

On 22 April 2005, in one of the court sessions near the end of that phase of the proceedings, Moussaoui surprised the court by unexpectedly pleading guilty to all charges, while at the same time denying having any intention to produce a massacre like 9/11. He said that it was not his conspiracy, and that he intended to free Sheikh Omar Abdel-Rahman. According to Moussaoui, his master plan was to hijack a Boeing 747-400, since the plane is one of a few that could reach Afghanistan from the U.S. without any intermediate stops.

On 6 February 2006, Moussaoui shouted "I am al-Qaeda. They do not represent me; they are Americans," referring to his attorneys while being escorted from the courtroom in front of 120 potential jurors.

In March 2006, during the Moussaoui trial, several premises made headlines, including FBI agents stating that the bureau was aware, years before the attacks in 2001, that al-Qaeda planned to use planes to destroy important buildings, and Brinkema's decision to consider dismissal of the death penalty. However, days later, under significant media attention, Brinkema decided not to dismiss the case, and instead ruled that witnesses could not testify and the government would be allowed to continue to seek the death sentence against him.

On 27 March 2006, Moussaoui testified that he and "shoe bomber" Richard Reid had planned to crash a hijacked airplane into the White House in 11 September attacks. No direct connection between Moussaoui and Reid had ever before been alleged, and this testimony contradicted earlier testimony by Moussaoui that he had been intended for an operation after 11 September. When asked why he had previously lied, he stated that "You're allowed to lie for jihad. You're allowed any technique to defeat your enemy." There has been commentary in the mainstream media that Moussaoui's preference to die as an identified 9/11 plotter rather than receive a life sentence as a member of an unrealized scheme throws doubt on his self-admitted connection to 9/11.

=== Court statements ===
Moussaoui refused legal representation for years; he entered confusing, insulting, and parallel court pleadings. His pleadings, statements, and behavior included the following:

2 January 2002: Moussaoui stated, "In the name of Allah, I do not have anything to plea, and I enter no plea."

22 April 2002: Moussaoui tried to fire his court-appointed lawyers. Judge Brinkema took the request under advisement; on 13 June 2002, she ordered that he had the right to defend himself, and a search began for a Muslim lawyer. Moussaoui cited several surahs of the Qur'an—including Al-i-imran 3:118, Al-anfal 8:36, Al-anfal 8:45, Al-i-Imran 3:175 and Al-An-am 6:162—to the judge as justification for firing his lawyers, proof of the government's and judge's corruption, confirmation of his innocence, and assurance that he was taking the best possible course of defense. He then prayed to Allah for the return of Al-Andalus (Spain and Portugal) and the deliverance of Ceuta, Melilla, India and Kashmir to the Muslims. He also prayed for the destruction of several nations—including Israel (and the Jewish people as a whole), Russia, Canada, UK, Australia, and the U.S.—and for the liberation of Palestine, Chechnya, and Afghanistan. The Court ordered a psychiatric evaluation in response.

7 June 2002: A court-appointed psychiatrist declared Moussaoui sufficiently competent for trial.

11 June 2002: Moussaoui filed a motion, titled Motion for pre-contempt of Leonie Brinkema order to declare Zacarias Moussaoui crazy, which insisted on his competence to stand trial. In it, he said he had tried "to get the help of the European Court of Justice and Parliaments". He then offered a psychological analysis of Judge Brinkema:

Mental Status Enumeration: Axis 1; Acute symptoms of Islamophobia with complex of gender inferiority.
Diagnostic Impressions: Legal pathological killer instinct with egoboasting dementia to become supreme.

Conclusion and Recommendations: Immediate psychiatric hospitalization to specialist unit (propose unit UBL treatment center ... )

18 July 2002: Moussaoui entered a guilty plea, stating, "I have knowledge and I participated in al-Qaeda. I am a member of al-Qaeda ... I pledge bayat to Osama bin Laden." The Court rejected the guilty plea as unconsidered and ordered Moussaoui to rethink his plea.

24 July 2002: Moussaoui's roommate from Oklahoma flight school, 24-year-old Hussein al-Attas, pleaded guilty to seven counts of making false statements, including the following:

The truth is that on several occasions, during the short time I knew him (Moussaoui) had expressed a general desire to participate in jihad, so my statement to the contrary was false ... When the agents asked if I (also) knew his real name, I lied and said I did not.

Al-Attas stated that he told the FBI he was going to Pakistan to seek medical assistance for a sick relative in Saudi Arabia, but admitted, "The real reason was (Moussaoui) had convinced me to go to speak to Islamic scholars and others who hold the belief that Islamic religion favors participation in jihad."

Furthermore, al-Attas admitted to lying about his plans to go with Moussaoui to New York City in late August, 2001. He also confessed that he lied about some of Moussaoui's classmates at an Oklahoma flight school.

28 July 2002: Moussaoui pleaded guilty to four of six counts of conspiracy. He denied charges of conspiracy to murder United States employees and destroy property.

Today, I truthfully will enter on some of the charges, not all, a plea of guilty ... It should not be misunderstood that I endorse the entire indictment. There is enough factual basis for me to plead guilty in a truthful manner.

The Court rejected the guilty plea as too informal and reappointed his counsel. Moussaoui's response to this order to work with court-appointed counsel was, "It is most disgusting."

22 April 2003: Moussaoui filed a pleading with the header shown below. In the pleading, Judge Brinkema is referred to as "Death Judge Leonie".

In the Name of Allah; Censured by the United Sodom of America
4/19/2003; Case No. 01455A; 17 S 1423
Slave of Allah, Zacharias Moussaoui vs.

Slave of Satan, John Ashcroft

18 July 2003: Moussaoui filed two pleadings. The first was titled Wanted for WTC Bankruptcy and offered an accounting of "WTC profit and loss" of "Loss: 3000 sons of evil. Profit: 19 slaves of Allah." That document had the following header:

In the Name of Allah; Censured by the United Satan of America
Slave of Allah, Zacharias Moussaoui vs.

Slave of Satan, Bush and Ashcroft

The second pleading was titled No Pig Man Role in Moussaoui Deliverance Scenario and stated "To be seen in all God Fearing World Theatre Cinema. Deadline for 3000+ hotseat tickets (please contact United Booking Limited)."

21 March 2006: In response to al-Atta's testimony, Moussaoui commented, "God Bless Mohamed Atta."

6 May 2006: In an affidavit filed by his attorneys after the trial, Moussaoui stated,

10. During the plea colloquy I made it clear to the Court that I did not have knowledge of and was not a member of the plot to hijack and crash planes into buildings in 11 September 2001 but that I was part of another Al-Qaeda plot which was to occur after 11 September 2001.

11. My court appointed attorneys kept telling me that I should not testify and I thought that they would prevent me from testifying, so I decided to ask the government to let me testify as their witness.

12. It is my recollection that when the judge addressed the jury before my trial began, she informed the jury that I was part of the 11 September plot which further confirmed my distrust of the American justice system and further convinced me to testify since I was going to be given death for the 11 September plot anyway.

13. I decided to testify that I had knowledge of and was a member of the plot to hijack planes and crash them into buildings on 11 September 2001, even though I knew that was a complete fabrication.

14. I have never met Mohammed Atta and, while I may have seen a few of the other hijackers at the guesthouse, I never knew them or anything about their operation.

15. As I stated during my plea colloquy, I was in the United States as a member of Al-Qaeda but was involved in a separate operation ...

18. Because I now see that it is possible that I can receive a fair trial even with Americans as jurors and that I can have the opportunity to prove that I did not have any knowledge of and was not a member of the plot to hijack planes and crash them into buildings on 11 September 2001, I wish to withdraw my guilty plea and ask the Court for a new trial to prove my innocence of the 11 September plot.

Additional case filings are posted online.

=== Trial and sentencing ===
Moussaoui, charged with conspiring to hijack planes and crash them into the World Trade Center and the Pentagon, was in jail in Minnesota when the 11 Sept. attacks unfolded. In seeking a death sentence, prosecutors were required to prove that he "intentionally participated in an act ... and the victim died as a direct result of the act". Moussaoui admitted he knew about the attacks and did nothing to stop them.

Having entered a guilty plea, Moussaoui was eligible for the death penalty. Germany said it would not release evidence against Moussaoui unless the U.S. promised not to seek death as punishment. On 27 April 2005, French Justice Minister Dominique Perben said, "When France gave elements of information about Mr Moussaoui to the American justice, I obtained a written engagement of the United States not to use these elements to require or execute the death penalty."

On 14 March 2006, Brinkema ruled that the prosecution could continue to seek the death penalty against Moussaoui, but could not use key witnesses coached by government lawyer Carla Martin. On 3 April 2006, the jury in his case decided that Moussaoui was eligible for the death penalty.

At Moussaoui's sentencing trial, FBI agent Greg Jones testified that, prior to the attacks, he urged his supervisor, Michael Maltbie, "to prevent Zacarias Moussaoui from flying a plane into the World Trade Center". Maltbie had refused to act on 70 requests from another agent, Harry Samit, to obtain a warrant to search Moussaoui's computer.

On 3 May 2006, the jury reached a verdict: that Moussaoui be sentenced to life in prison without the possibility of parole. Moussaoui was sentenced to six consecutive life terms on 4 May, as Judge Brinkema expressed her belief that the sentence was an appropriate one, inasmuch as it would deprive Moussaoui of "martyrdom in a great big bang of glory" and of the "chance to speak again", after Moussaoui entered the courtroom proclaiming his victory and asserting that the United States would "never get Osama bin Laden". As he was leaving the courtroom, Moussaoui said, "America, you lost and I won," and clapped his hands twice. In fact, a single juror had saved Moussaoui from death — the foreman of the 12-person federal jury told The Washington Post that the panel voted 11–1, 10–2 and 10–2 in favor of the death penalty on the three charges for which Moussaoui was eligible for execution. A unanimous vote on any one of the three terrorism charges was required to return a death sentence.

On 8 May 2006, Moussaoui filed papers with the federal court in Alexandria, Virginia requesting to withdraw his guilty plea, stating that his earlier claim of participation in 11 September plot was a "complete fabrication". He said that he was "extremely surprised" that he was not sentenced to death. "I now see that it is possible that I can receive a fair trial even with Americans as jurors," he said. However, federal sentencing rules forbid pleas to be withdrawn after a sentence has already been executed, and Moussaoui had already waived his rights to appeal.

On 13 May 2006, Moussaoui was moved from his holding cell in Alexandria, Virginia, and transported via JPATS to the supermax United States Penitentiary Administrative Maximum Facility, located near Florence, Colorado. The facility is considered the most secure federal penitentiary.

On 31 July 2006, the 1,202 exhibits presented during the case of United States v. Zacarias Moussaoui were posted online, marking the first time the exhibits of a criminal case in U.S. courts were so published.

On 20 November 2007, Judge Brinkema publicly stated that the US government had provided incorrect information about evidence in the Moussaoui trial and that due to those actions, she was considering ordering a new trial in a related terrorism case, that of Ali al-Timimi, a Virginia Muslim cleric. Brinkema said that she could no longer trust the CIA and other government agencies on how they represent classified evidence in cases regarding terrorism after Moussaoui case prosecutors admitted that the CIA had assured her that no videotapes or audiotapes existed of interrogations of certain high-profile terrorism detainees, but later, in a letter made public 13 November, two such videotapes and one audio tape were made known. According to his testimony, the citizen had training in accounting and organized the Al Qaeda's finances.

=== Osama bin Laden's alleged response ===
On 23 May 2006, an audio recording attributed to bin Laden said in translation that Moussaoui "had no connection at all with 11 September... I am the one in charge of the 19 brothers and I never assigned brother Zacarias to be with them in that mission ... Since Zacarias Moussaoui was still learning to fly, he wasn't number 20 in the group, as your government claimed". The voice alleged to be bin Laden also suggested that Moussaoui's confession was "void" as it was a result of pressures applied during his incarceration.

=== 2015 civil action ===
Civil action is being taken by relatives of 9/11 victims, insurers, and others against the Saudi Arabian government. In the course of this, Zacarias Moussaoui has stated on oath and wrote to Judge George B. Daniels that Saudi royal family members helped finance 11 September attacks and al-Qaeda. Prince Turki bin Faisal Al Saud, Prince Bandar Bin Sultan, and Prince Al-Waleed bin Talal of the Saudi royal family were specifically mentioned as Al-Qaeda donors—but the project's major patron was Prince Salman bin Abdulaziz Al Saud, who, in 2015, became Saudi Arabia's king. Moussaoui's testimony provided new details of the extent and nature of that support in the pre-9/11 period. Judge Leonie M. Brinkema declared "Moussaoui is completely competent", called him "an extremely intelligent man" and added: "He has actually a better understanding of the legal system than some lawyers I've seen in court".

Former senators Bob Graham of Florida and Bob Kerrey of Nebraska, and the former Navy secretary John Lehman, believed the Saudi role in the 9/11 plot had never been adequately examined, and they demanded the release of 28 pages of the congressional report that explored Saudi connections. The George W. Bush and Barack Obama administrations both had refused to declassify the 28 pages on the grounds of maintaining national security. In January 2015, Graham, Congressmen Walter Jones and Stephen Lynch announced the reintroduction of the resolution calling for the declassification of the 28 pages. Graham said that the pages implicate Saudi Arabia as the principal financier of the hijackers. In 2016, a partially redacted form of the pages were declassified by the Obama administration.

== See also ==
- Trials related to the 11 September attacks
