= Kenyan captives in the war on terror =

Some Kenyan have ended up captives in the war on terror. The East Africa Standard reported on July 29, 2008, that 19 individuals suspected of ties to al Qaeda apprehended in Kenya in the winter of 2007 were: "removed from police custody by foreign security agents for interrogation."

Der Spiegel reports that Kenyan authorities worked with the US when it backed an Ethiopian incursion into Somalia around New Year 2007. It reports that as many as 200 American FBI and CIA officers were involved.

A Kenyan Parliamentary report states:

The rendition of the terror suspects is illegal under the Constitution and international law because it disregards judicial and administrative processes.

The report states some captives were arrested before being handed over to foreign custody, while others were simply kidnapped.

The 19 Kenyans were among a larger group of captives most of whom were not Kenyans. Captives were rendered to Ethiopia and Somalia. One captive, Abdulmalik Mohamed, was transported to extrajudicial detention in the United States' Guantanamo Bay detention camp, in Cuba.

Kenyans informally transferred to foreign custody
Aden Sheikh Abdullahi
Saidi Shifa
Salam Ngama
Bashir Hussein Chirag Mohammed Sader
Said Hamisi Mohamed
Swaleh Ali Tunza
Hassan Shaban Mwazume
Hussein Ali Said
Tsuma Solomon Adam Ayila
Abdi Muhammed Abdillahi
Salim Awadh Salim
Abdulrashid Mohamed
Kasim Musa Mwarusi
Ali Musa Mwarusi
Abdallah Halifan Tondwe
Nasru Tuko
Mohammed Said Mohamed
Saqaawi Diin
Wahab Mohamed Abdulmalik
