= Lockerbie (disambiguation) =

Lockerbie is a town in south-west Scotland.

Lockerbie may also refer to:

- Lockerbie bombing, the terrorist bombing of Pan Am Flight 103 in December 1988

== Places ==
- Lockerbie railway station
- Lockerbie Square, Indianapolis, Indiana, US
  - Lockerbie Square Historic District
- Lockerbie Scrub, Queensland, Australia
- Lockerbie, Victoria, a proposed suburb of Melbourne, Australia

== Media ==
- Lockerbie: The Story and the Lessons, a book focussing on the civil litigation against Pan Am
- Lockerbie (TV serial), a BBC One/Netflix limited series starring Connor Swindells
- Lockerbie: A Search for Truth, a Sky Atlantic/Peacock limited series starring Colin Firth

== People ==
- Gary Lockerbie (born 1982), British golfer

== See also ==
- Lockerby (disambiguation)
