= Carla Martin =

American lawyer

- Born: Washington, D.C., US
- Education: University of Tennessee, Knoxville (BA); American University (JD)
- Occupation: lawyer

Carla Jean Martin is an American lawyer.

== Early life and career ==
Carla is the daughter of Charles W. Martin and Jean D. Henderson. She was born in Washington, D.C. and her family lived there until she was 9. Her father was an attorney who worked for the federal government in the 1950s until 1963 when he went into private practice in Tennessee, resulting in the family moving there. Her mother is a former government secretary and assistant.

Martin graduated cum laude from the University of Tennessee at Knoxville in 1976. She became a flight attendant before attending law school.

== Attorney career ==
Martin earned her J.D. degree from the Washington College of Law at American University in Washington D.C. in 1989

Martin was admitted to the bar in Pennsylvania in 1990. She began working at the Federal Aviation Administration (FAA) during law school.

Martin was responsible, as FAA counsel, for the Pan Am Flight 103/Lockerbie bombing case for several years, both the civil litigation trial in 1992 against Pan American World Airways in New York, as well as the criminal prosecution of the Lockerbie bomber defendants Megrahi and Fhimah in the Scottish court at Zeist, Netherlands in 2000. Ms. Martin's work in the civil litigation case is chronicled in the book by aviation security expert Rodney Wallis, Lockerbie: The Story and the Lessons. Her job then was to protect information about airline security, sensitive security information (SSI), from entering the trial’s public record.

Martin was also involved in the prosecution of Richard Reid, the shoe bomber.

=== Moussaoui trial ===
While working for the Federal Aviation Administration, Martin was assigned to the case of United States v. Zacarias Moussaoui and continued her work on that case after transferring to the Transportation Security Administration (TSA) in 2002. During the sentencing trial in March 2006, Judge Leonie Brinkema learned that Martin contacted seven FAA witnesses in an apparent violation of a court order. Martin denied any wrongdoing in connection with her work on the Moussaoui trial. The federal investigation concerning Martin's work in the case was dropped, without public comment or elaboration, in September 2006.

== See also ==
- Airline security
- Airport security repercussions due to the September 11, 2001 attacks
- Sensitive Security Information
