= Brian L. Mizer =

United States Navy JAG officer

Brian Mizer
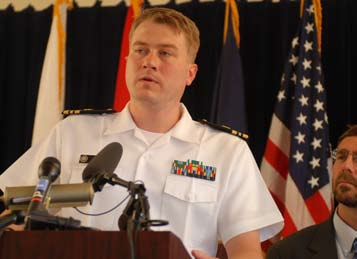
- Captain Brian L. Mizer, USN
- Military career
- Branch: United States Navy
- Rank: Captain

Brian L. Mizer is a United States Navy JAG officer. He is from the State of Nebraska. He attended Creighton University in Omaha, Nebraska, for his undergraduate degree and Case Western Reserve University for his Juris Doctor.

He is notable for serving as one of the chief defense counsel for Salim Ahmed Hamdan, a former driver of Osama bin Laden, when he faced charges before a Guantánamo military commission.

On 23 April 2008 attorneys working on behalf of Salim Ahmed Hamdan requested permission to meet with Abdulmalik Mohammed and Mustafa al-Hawsawi. Hamdan's attorneys had previously requested permission to get the "high-value detainees" to answer written questions, which would confirm whether Hamdan played a role in al Qaeda, and, if so, if it had been a peripheral one. Abdulmalik Mohammed and Mustafa al-Hawsawi declined to answer the questions, because they said they had no way to know that the questions purporting to be from Hamdan's attorneys was not a ruse. Andrea J. Prasow requested permission for Lieutenant Commander Brian Mizer to meet in person with the two men to try to assure them that the questions were not a ruse, and would not be shared with their interrogators.

Hamdan was convicted in August 2008. His Presiding Officer's decision that he should be credited with the time he had already served, left him with a scheduled release date of December 31, 2008—just over four months later. Chief Prosecutor Lawrence Morris filed an appeal, asserting that Presiding Officers didn't have the authority to credit time served. The Wall Street Journal quoted Mizer's response: "I really am at a loss for words. The government, having stacked the deck, is now complaining about the hand it was dealt."

In November 2008 The New Republic quoted Mizer explaining why the use of torture would complicate the prosecution of other suspects.

- "The coercive interrogation techniques that have been used, that in many cases have amounted to torture, is going to make prosecuting these defendants very difficult in any traditional court martial or federal court."
- "the vast majority of detainees at Guantánamo Bay could not be prosecuted in state or federal court, or through military courts martial because they have not committed any crime that existed at the time it was committed."

Mizer told reporters that he was surprised to learn that Hamdan had been transferred to Yemen on 1 December 2008, calling it "welcome news".

In the fall of 2008 chief prosecutor Colonel Morris Davis resigned after a conflict of authority with Brigadier General Thomas W. Hartmann. Davis felt that Hartmann had inappropriately usurped his own role in designating which captives should face charges, when Hartmann's role as Legal Advisor to the Convening Authority for the Guantánamo Military Commissions required neutrality. Davis became a critic of the operation of the Military Commission system, and on December 8, 2008, The New York Times reported that Mizer planned to call upon Davis to testify on undue command influence in Hamdan's case.

In early January 2009 the Office of Military Commissions dismissed all charges against all the suspects, with plans to re-initiate those charges later. Commentators described the state of the cases against the captives as "chaotic". According to Peter Finn, reporting in The Washington Post, Mizer greeted the news with disbelief, stating: "This is military justice 101."

When President Barack Obama ordered the closure of Guantánamo base on January 22, 2009 Mizer commented:

There isn't going to be justice for anyone at Guantánamo, for the victims' families or the accused."

== Media appearances ==
Mizer was one of the individuals who appeared in Laura Poitras 2010 documentary film The Oath. A New York Times review of the film described Mizer as a "compelling figure".

...his American lawyers, particularly Lt. Cmdr. Brian Mizer, emerge as compelling figures, arguing with startling force against the legitimacy of the Bush administration’s military commissions and questioning the possibility of their client’s receiving a fair trial. Commander Mizer deserves a film of his own; in "The Oath" he’s a fascinating sidelight.

Mizer appeared in PBS interviews on multiple occasions.
