= Abdulmalik Mohammed =

Kenyan Guantanamo detainee

Mohammed Abdul Malik Bajabu
- Born: November 11, 1973 (age 53); Kisumu, Kenya
- Arrested: February 2007; Kenya unknown
- Citizenship: Kenya
- Detained at: Guantanamo
- Other names: Wahab Mohamed Abdulmalik, Abdul Malik
- ISN: 10025
- Charge: No charge
- Status: Released

Mohammed Abdul Malik Bajabu (born November 11, 1973) is a citizen of Kenya who was held in extrajudicial detention in the United States' Guantanamo Bay detention camps, in Cuba. Abdul Malik was captured in February 2007, on suspicion of leading a terrorist bomb-plot in Mombasa. He was transferred to Guantanamo on 26 March 2007. Abdul Malik is a confirmed member of the East Africa al-Qaeda network as well as a confirmed member of the Council of Islamic Courts and the Islamic Part of Kenya. He "actively participated" in the facilitation of weapons and the planning of terrorist acts against the U.S., according to the Joint Task Force (JTF) at Guantanamo Bay. He was recommended for continued detention under the Department of Defense's control. The JTF gave Abdul Malik a high risk threat against the United States' interests and allies. He has no reports of disciplinary infractions as of May 22, 2007, granting him a low detention risk value. Abdul Malik does, however, have a high intelligence value.

According to Kenya's Daily Nation Abdul Malik was a protégé of Harun Fazul, described as "...the most wanted terror suspect in the region."

According to Kenya's Daily Nation:

Sources say Mr Abdulmalik gave useful information to the police before he turned hostile, prompting his transfer to the high security prison at Guantanamo Bay.

According to a British Broadcasting Corporation report from 4 May 2007, Abdul Malik confessed, under interrogation, to a role in the 2002 bombing of the Paradise Hotel in Mombasa. According to the BBC report, Abdul Malik had been transferred to Guantanamo a month earlier.

== Questions from Salim Ahmed Hamdan's defense attorney ==
On 23 April 2008 attorneys working on behalf of Salim Ahmed Hamdan requested permission to meet with Abdul Malik and Mustafa al-Hawsawi. Hamdan's attorneys had previously requested permission to get the "high-value detainees" to answer written questions, which would confirm that if Hamdan played a role in al Qaeda it had been a peripheral one. Abdul Malik and Mustafa al-Hawsawi declined to answer the questions, because they said they had no way to know that the questions purporting to be from Hamdan's attorneys was not a ruse. Andrea J. Prasow requested permission for Lieutenant Commander Brian Mizer to meet in person with the two men to try to assure them that the questions were not a ruse, and would not be shared with their interrogators.

== Combatant Status Review Tribunal ==
Abdul Malik has not had a Combatant Status Review Tribunal convened to confirm or refute whether he should be classed as an "enemy combatant". In an interview with the East Africa Standard Abdul Malik's lawyer Clara Gutteridge described the difficulties Reprieve had first with meeting with him, and later to get their notes released after a security check. They were told that the meeting, and the release of notes, were not permitted until a captive had their Combatant Status Review Tribunal. But Guantanamo authorities failed to schedule his Combatant Status Review Tribunal

In her interview Gutteridge speculated that the reason Abdul Malik Mohamed never had a Combatant Status Review Tribunal scheduled is that the USA had no evidence to justify his detention. She said he had been transferred to camp 4, the camp for the most privilege, most compliant captives, two months after his arrival in Guantanamo, and that FBI interrogators had told him they did not believe he belonged in Guantanamo, and there was an order in Washington for his release.

Gutteridge said Reprieve successfully litigated to get access to Abdul Malik Mohamed in early 2008, but their notes had not been cleared, and they had not been allowed to talk about them until early October 2008.

Gutteridge said that when Reprieve finally got access to Abdul Malik he informed them that he had been abused both when he was in Kenyan custody, and later in American custody. He informed them that he had been held in Bagram and Kabul, prior to his transfer to Guantanamo.

== Lawsuits ==
The BBC reported on December 11, 2009 Abdul Malik's family is suing the Kenyan government over its role in his detention in Guantanamo. The BBC reports that his family have an affidavit from Kenyan police stating that they have no reason to suspect that he has any ties to terrorism. His first hearing is scheduled for 14 January 2010.

The Associated Press reports that he has had a Combatant Status Review Tribunal, but that the United States Department of Defense has refused to make public a transcript as it has for all of the other captives. According to the Associated Press DoD spokesman Major Tanya Bradsher asserted that the transcript from his CSR Tribunal remained classified.

The Associated Press quoted Cori Crider, of the human rights organization Reprieve, which has helped with his defense. Crider claimed that the allegations against him were all based on confession coerced through torture. Crider claimed that Kenyan interrogators had threatened to castrate him if he did not confess to the allegations leveled against him.

Kenyan law allows the police to hold suspects for 14 days, before they lay a charge. The lawsuit filed on Abdul Malik's behalf says police held him for longer than the 14 days the law allows, from February 13, 2007 to February 27, 2007, in addition to subjecting him to abusive interrogation techniques, and not letting him consult legal advice. Kenyan Police officials assert that he was held for less than 14 days, and that he was released—that they did not hand him over to US officials.

According to The Standard Kenyan Justice Minister Mutula Kilonzo "broke silence" and requested the United States to repatriate Abdul Malik in December 2009.

In April 2010, Reuters and the Associated Press reported that the Kenyan Foreign Ministry had written to Abdul Malik's lawyers, informing them that they had initiated the process of getting him repatriated.

== Joint Review Task Force ==
When he assumed office in January 2009, President Barack Obama made a number of promises about the future of Guantanamo. He promised the use of torture would cease at the camp. He promised to institute a new review system. That new review system was composed of officials from six departments, where the OARDEC reviews were conducted entirely by the Department of Defense. When it reported back, a year later, the Joint Review Task Force classified some individuals as too dangerous to be transferred from Guantanamo, even though there was insufficient admissible evidence to justify criminal charges against them. On April 9, 2013, that document was made public after a Freedom of Information Act request.

Abdul Malik was one of the 71 individuals deemed too innocent to charge, but too dangerous to release. On March 7, 2011, President Obama created the Periodic Review Board to fulfill his promise that the status of these individuals would be reviewed. Abdul Malik was approved for transfer on December 27, 2021.

== Release ==
Abdul Malik was transferred to Kenya on December 17, 2024.

== See also ==
- Shaker Aamer
