= Lockerby =

Lockerby may refer to:

- Lockerby, Ontario, community in Ontario, Canada
- Lockerby, Greater Sudbury, Ontario, Canada
  - Lockerby Composite School

== See also ==
- Lockerbie (disambiguation)
