= Camp four (Guantanamo) =

Part of the Guantanamo Bay detention complex

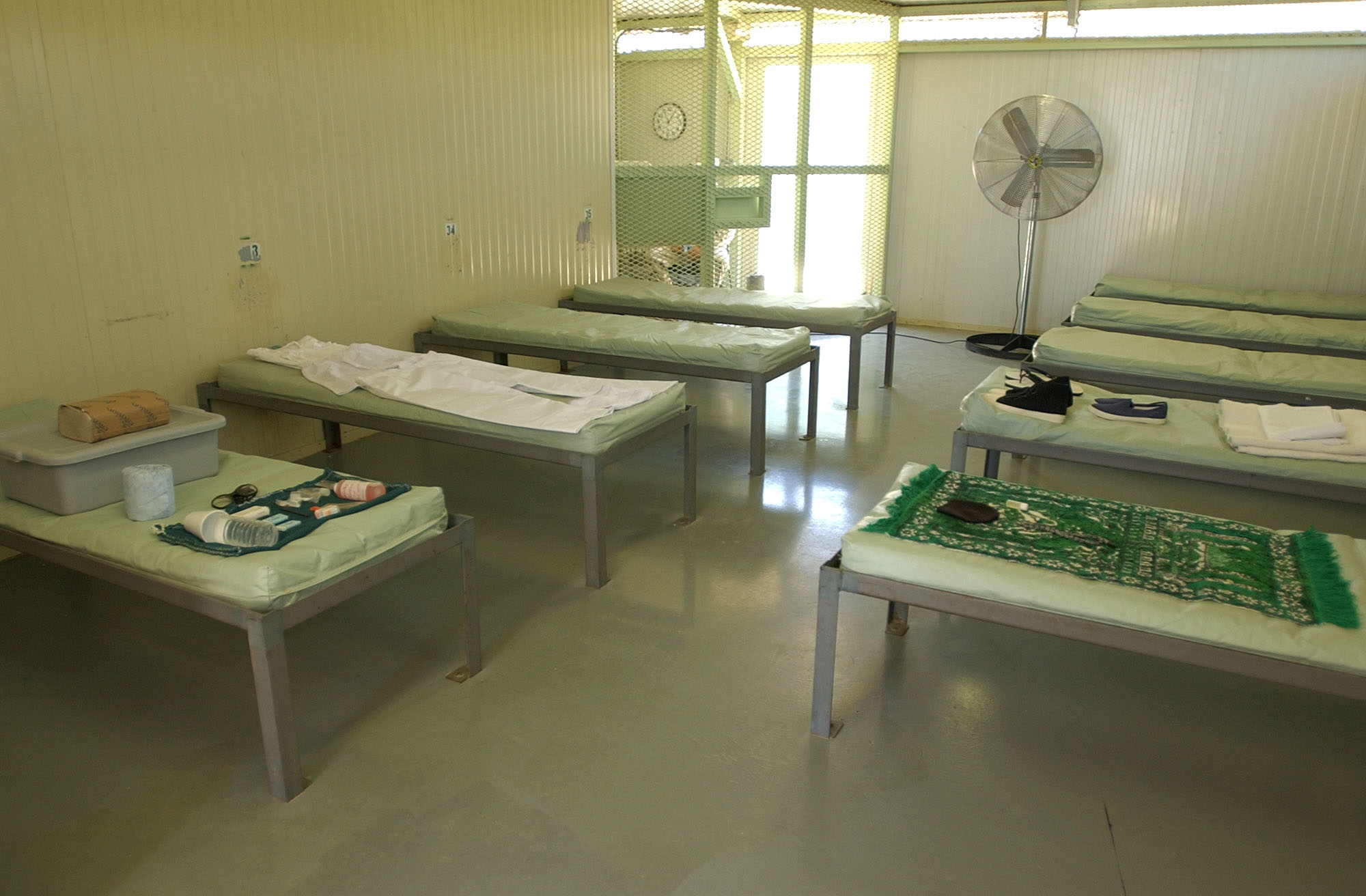
Camp four barracks, May 2006. Captives in Camp four live in communal barracks, similar to those in POW camps.

Camp four is one of the camps that make up the complex of camps for captives held in extrajudicial detention in the United States' Guantanamo Bay detention camps, in Cuba. Camp four is the camp that most closely resembles a traditional Prisoner of War camp. Captives held there live in communal dormitories, and have day long access to communal exercise yard, games, and books.

Camp authorities only allowed the captives they considered "compliant" to stay in camp four. The captives in Camp four are allowed to wear white or tan uniforms which distinguish them from the orange uniforms "non-compliant" captives wear.

== Incident at Camp IV ==
On May 19, 2006 a skirmish took place in Bay 1, Zulu Block (building) of Camp IV. A ten-person "quick reaction force" entered bay 1 in response to a possible suicide attempt. A scuffle ensued for about five minutes between the team and the occupants, which escalated to the use of tear gas, non-lethal bullets, and "bean bags" against light fixtures and fan blades. Six occupants were treated for minor injuries.
