= Lockerbie: The Story and the Lessons =

Lockerbie: The Story and the Lessons is a book by aviation security expert Rodney Wallis on the Pan Am 103/Lockerbie bombing case, focusing upon the civil litigation trial brought by surviving family members against the now defunct Pan American World Airways.

== Lockerbie civil case ==
The civil trial took place in 1992 in the Eastern District of New York, before United States District Court Judge Thomas C. Platt. In his book, Wallis, a former director of security for the International Air Transport Association (IATA) brings together the facts surrounding the sabotage on 21 December 1988 of Pan Am Flight 103, and details how the civil litigation developed so many of the facts surrounding the bombing for the first time. Wallis's book uncovers the fundamental weaknesses in Pan Am's communication and corporate security management policies which created an environment where good aviation security was impossible. The government's unusual role in protecting sensitive aviation security information that was introduced at trial is also described. The jury eventually found defendant Pan American Airways liable for "willful misconduct."

== Lockerbie criminal trial ==
The criminal trial was held in 2000 at a specially convened Scottish Court in the Netherlands. Two Libyans were accused of carrying out the Lockerbie bombing: one was convicted on 270 counts of murder (Abdelbaset al-Megrahi) and was sentenced to life imprisonment; the other was found not guilty (Lamin Khalifah Fhimah) and was released.
