= Mustafa al-Hawsawi =

Saudi Arabian terrorist

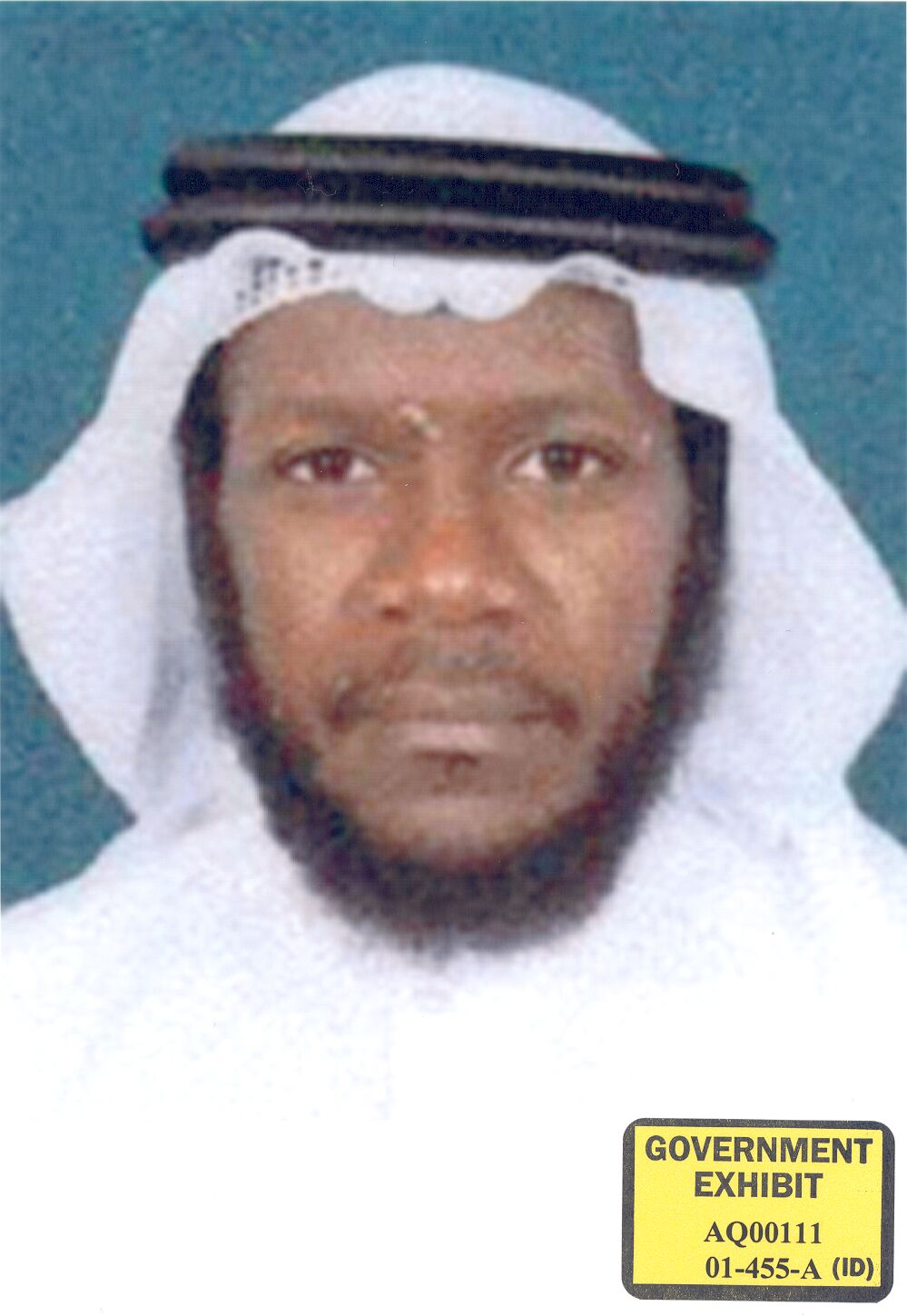
- Born: Mustafa Ahmed Adam al-Hawsawi; August 5, 1968 (age 58); Jeddah, Saudi Arabia
- Detained at: CIA black site Guantanamo Bay
- ISN: 10011
- Charge(s): Pleaded guilty to charges before a military commission, plea overturned

Mustafa Ahmed Adam al-Hawsawi (Arabic: مصطفى احمد ادم الهوساوي; born August 5, 1968) is a Saudi Arabian citizen. He is alleged to have acted as a key financial facilitator for the September 11 attacks in the United States.

Mustafa al-Hawsawi was captured in Pakistan by Pakistani agents in March 2003 and was transferred to the custody of the United States. He was held in secret CIA black sites until September 2006, when he was transferred to Guantánamo Bay and U.S. officials finally acknowledged his imprisonment. It detained him at the Salt Pit, a secret black site in Afghanistan. It was reported in August 2010 that, after months of interrogation, the CIA transferred al-Hawsawi and three other high-value detainees to Guantanamo Bay detention camp on September 24, 2003, for indefinite detention. Fearing that Rasul v. Bush, a pending Supreme Court case about detainees' habeas corpus rights, might result in having to provide the men with access to counsel, the CIA took back custody on March 27, 2004, and transported the four men to one of their black sites.

It has long been known that, during al-Hawsawi's CIA captivity, his captors injured him, causing him to suffer from anal fissures, chronic hemorrhoids and, most seriously, symptomatic rectal prolapse. When the United States Senate Intelligence Committee published a 600-page unclassified summary of its 6,000-page report on the CIA's use of torture, the world learned that the CIA routinely punished its captives by sodomizing them, claiming the sodomy was the long abandoned medical technique of rectal feeding. The United States Senate Intelligence Committee's investigation of the CIA's Torture Program revealed that detainees were routinely subjected to unnecessary rectal exams without evidence of medical necessity for purposes of behavioral control. CIA leadership, including General Counsel Scott Muller and DDO James Pavitt, were alerted to allegations that rectal exams were conducted with "excessive force" on two detainees at the Salt Pit detention site. CIA records indicate that one of the detainees, Mustafa al-Hawsawi, was later diagnosed with chronic hemorrhoids, an anal fissure, and symptomatic rectal prolapse.

Al-Hawsawi was transferred from CIA custody to military custody at Guantanamo on September 6, 2006. The Bush administration was then confident of the passage of the Military Commissions Act of 2006, which restricted detainee use of habeas corpus, and prohibited them from using the federal court system (this provision was, however, ruled unconstitutional in Boumediene v. Bush (2008), and numerous habeas corpus petitions were refiled in the federal courts). Al-Hawsawi remains incarcerated at Guantanamo Bay. On July 31, 2024, Al-Hawsawi agreed to plead guilty to avoid the death penalty. His plea deal was revoked by Secretary of Defense Lloyd Austin two days later.

== Alleged role in 9/11 attacks ==
Although it is alleged that al-Hawsawi was a member of al-Qaeda, he stated in a Combatant Status Review Hearing that he is not a member of al-Qaeda, and never swore an oath of allegiance to Osama bin Laden.

Al-Hawsawi had previously worked in Al-Qaeda's media committee and was selected by Khalid Shaikh Mohammad to assist as a travel and financial facilitator for the hijackers. This was done after Mohammed's nephew, Ali Abdul Aziz Ali, requested assistance with helping the hijackers. Mohammed stated al-Hawsawi was one of the main contacts for the hijackers while they were in the U.S and that Mohammed's knowledge about the pilots mainly came from al-Hawsawi or Ramzi bin al-Shibh.

Al-Hawsawi was charged with being in the United Arab Emirates starting in April 2001, and would help send the last four operatives (other than al-Mihdhar) to the U.S and assisted them by purchasing clothing, food, lodging, rental cars, traveler's checks, and making travel arrangements. Al-Hawsawi's role as a financial facilitator appeared to have begun when hijacker Banihammad helped al-Hawsawi complete an account application in the UAE and granted him power of attorney over his account so al-Hawsawi could forward the bank card to him in the US; $4,900 was subsequently deposited into this account by al-Hawsawi. Between June and September 2001, al-Hawsawi collected money, packages and provided various sums money to the hijackers. In early September 2001, hijackers started sending al-Hawsawi a series of wire transfers totaling about $28,000 — apparently unspent advances on expenses — from addresses in Broward County, Florida, and Boston. Al-Hawsawi would later comment that as the money flowed in, he came to understand that "an operation" would soon happen.

On September 11, 2001, al-Hawsawi traveled from the United Arab Emirates to Pakistan. Al-Hawsawi said that he first learned of the 9/11 operation following the attacks and was surprised by the size of the 9/11 operation.

Al-Hawsawi's arrest on March 1, 2003, in Pakistan was unrelated to any reporting from CIA detainees. He was reportedly taken to the U.S. Bagram airbase in Afghanistan. The CIA maintained a detention and interrogation site there. This was not confirmed by U.S. officials.

On July 31, 2024, al-Hawsawi agreed to plead guilty to avoid the death penalty, but his plea was revoked by Secretary of Defense Lloyd Austin two days later.

== CIA custody ==
Al-Hawsawi was held in secret CIA custody for several years. When the United States Senate Intelligence Committee published a 600-page unclassified summary of its 6,000-page classified report on the CIA's use of torture, it became known that al-Hawsawi was held in several CIA black sites during his years in secret detention, where he was subjected to enhanced interrogation techniques which amounted to torture and cruel, inhuman, and degrading treatment. In particular, the report revealed that:

- Al-Hawsawi had been held in detention site COBALT, believed to be situated in Afghanistan, in 2003. There he was subjected to enhanced interrogation techniques, including water dousing without the approval from CIA headquarters and to rectal examinations conducted with "excessive force", leading to a diagnosis of chronic hemorrhoids, anal fissure, and symptomatic rectal prolapse;
- During his detainment at detention site VIOLET, believed to be located in Lithuania, al-Hawsawi required emergency medical care, but officers denied him access to a local hospital.

Moreover, the findings of the Senate Report raised doubts about Al-Hawsawi's detention, identifying him as one of a number of individuals who were detained under the CIA's program "despite doubts and questions surrounding [his] knowledge of terrorist threats and the location of senior al-Qa'ida leadership". In fact, after his first interrogation, the Chief of Interrogations wrote to CIA Headquarters saying that al-Hawsawi "does not appear to the [sic] be a person that is a financial mastermind."

== Questions from Salim Ahmed Hamdan's defense attorney ==
On April 23, 2008, attorneys working on behalf of Salim Ahmed Hamdan requested permission to meet with Abdulmalik Mohammed and Mustafa al-Hawsawi. Hamdan's attorneys had previously requested permission to get the "high-value detainees" to answer written questions. They believed the men would confirm that if Hamdan played a role in al Qaeda, it had been a peripheral one. Abdulmalik Mohammed and Mustafa al-Hawsawi declined to answer the questions, because they said they had no way to know that the questions purporting to be from Hamdan's attorneys were not a ruse. Andrea J. Prasow requested permission for Lieutenant Commander Brian Mizer to meet in person with the two men to try to assure them that the questions were not a ruse, and would not be shared with their interrogators.

== Military commission trial ==
In June 2008, al-Hawsawi and four other "high-value detainees" (Khalid Sheikh Mohammed, Ramzi bin al-Shibh, Ammar al-Baluchi, and Walid bin Attash) were charged with crimes brought before the Guantanamo military commission. The charges included 2,973 individual counts of murder, one for each person killed in the September 11 attacks, as well as conspiracy, murder in violation of the law of war, attacking civilians, attacking civilian objects, intentionally causing serious bodily injury, destruction of property in violation of the law of war, terrorism, and providing material support for terrorism. The judge ordered al-Hawsawi and bin al-Shibh to undergo mental competency hearings. On December 8, 2008, Khalid Sheikh Mohammed told the judge that he and the other four indictees wished to confess and plead guilty; however, the plea would be delayed until after the competency hearings for al-Hawsawi and bin al-Shibh, so that all five men could make their plea together. The charges against all five were dismissed on January 21, 2010, before a plea was entered.

In May 2009, Al Arabiya reported that Montasser el-Zayat, a prominent Egyptian attorney, had been invited to defend al-Hawsawi. El-Zayat described suspecting, at first, that he was the target of a hoax.

On August 31, 2009, Corrections One, a trade journal for the prison industry, proclaimed that "Mustafa Ahmed al-Hawsawi" was one of ten captives they speculated might be moved to a maximum security prison in Standish, Michigan.

== Official status reviews ==
Originally the Bush Presidency asserted that captives apprehended in the "war on terror" were not covered by the Geneva Conventions, and could be held indefinitely, without charge, and without an open and transparent review of the justifications for their detention. In 2004, the United States Supreme Court ruled, in Rasul v. Bush, that Guantanamo captives were entitled to being informed of the allegations justifying their detention, and were entitled to try to refute them.

=== Office for the Administrative Review of Detained Enemy Combatants ===
Combatant Status Review Tribunals were held in a 3x5 meter trailer where the captive sat with his hands and feet shackled to a bolt in the floor.

Following the Supreme Court's ruling, the Department of Defense set up the Office for the Administrative Review of Detained Enemy Combatants.

Scholars at the Brookings Institution, led by Benjamin Wittes, listed the captives still held in Guantanamo in December 2008, according to whether their detention was justified by certain common allegations, as follows:

- Mustafa Ahmed Adam al Hawasawi was listed as one of the captives who had faced charges before a military commission.

== United States Senate Torture Report ==
On December 9, 2014, a redacted executive summary of the U.S. Senate Intelligence Committee report on CIA torture was publicly released. This executive summary revealed the following information regarding al-Hawsawi's torture:

- He was subjected to rectal examinations conducted with excessive force and was later diagnosed with chronic hemorrhoids, an anal fissure, and symptomatic rectal prolapse.
- He was subjected to water dousing without approval from CIA Headquarters in a manner that was indistinguishable from waterboarding. This became the subject of a Central Intelligence Agency Office of Inspector General investigation.
- He was hospitalized for a medical emergency that occurred during his torture.

== Amnesty International, USA Campaign ==
On December 7, 2015, Amnesty International, USA launched a campaign to raise awareness regarding al-Hawsawi's military commission trial, which they alleged violates international fair trial standards by frustrating the truth seeking process by impeding transparency and denying accountability for torture.

== Human Rights bodies' criticism of al-Hawsawi's detention ==
=== UN Working Group on Arbitrary Detention ===
On January 23, 2015, the UN Working Group on Arbitrary Detention held that al-Hawsawi's ongoing detention in Guantánamo Bay was arbitrary, and in contravention of articles 9 and 10 of the Universal Declaration of Human Rights, and 9 and 14 of the International Covenant on Civil and Political Rights.

=== Inter-American Commission on Human Rights ===
On July 7, 2015, the Inter-American Commission on Human Rights adopted a resolution on precautionary measures regarding al-Hawsawi requesting the United States of America, inter alia, to adopt the necessary measures to protect the life and personal integrity of al-Hawsawi, and to adopt the necessary measures to ensure access to medical care and treatment.

== Formerly secret Joint Task Force Guantanamo assessment ==
On April 25, 2011, whistleblower organization WikiLeaks published formerly secret assessments drafted by Joint Task Force Guantanamo analysts. His seven-page Joint Task Force Guantanamo assessment was drafted on December 8, 2006. It was signed by deputy camp commandant Brigadier General Edward L. Secord. He recommended continued detention.
