= Ibrahim al-Banna =

Egyptian al-Qaeda member (born 1965)

Ibrahim al-Banna إبراهيم البنا
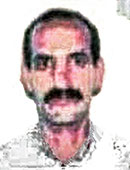
- Born: 1965 (age 60–61); Egypt
- Other names: Abu Ayman al-Masri; Ibrahim Muhammad Salih al-Banna
- Occupation: Jihadist
- Known for: Suspected of being an Al Qaeda intelligence chief

Ibrahim Muhammad Salih al-Banna (Arabic: إبراهيم محمد صالح البنا, romanized: Ibrāhīm Muḥammad Ṣāleḥ al-Bannā; born 1965), known simply as Ibrahim al-Banna (Arabic: إبراهيم البنا, romanized: Ibrāhīm al-Bannā), also known by his nom de guerre Abu Ayman al-Masri (Arabic: أبو أيمن المصري, romanized: Abū Ayman al-Maṣrī) is a citizen of Egypt who, security officials suspect, is a leader in Al Qaeda in the Arabian Peninsula (AQAP). Security officials have repeatedly claimed to have killed him with missiles launched from unmanned aerial vehicles. It was claimed in October 2011 that al-Banna had been killed along with six other individuals, including some who were alleged to have been associated with AQAP and at least one (Anwar al-Awlaki's 16-year-old son and American citizen Abdulrahman al-Awlaki) who was not. Ibrahim al-Banna was added to the U.S. State Department's Rewards for Justice wanted list on October 14, 2014.

== Background ==
According to the Jamestown Foundation, Yemeni security officials apprehended al-Banna in August 2010 and a Yemeni newspaper published transcripts of his interrogation in November 2010. The Jamestown Foundation published a profile of al-Banna based on those transcripts. The profile claimed that his full name was "Shaykh Ibrahim Muhammad Salih al-Banna" and his kunya was Abu Ayman al-Masri. They asserted that during his confession he acknowledged he was a member of Vanguards of Conquest, a branch of Egyptian Islamic Jihad as early as 1993, when members of the group went underground after it was suspected of being behind an attempt to assassinate Egyptian Prime Minister Atif Sidqi. Ibrahim al-Banna had escaped to Yemen where he was a member of a group led by brothers Ayman al-Zawahiri and Muhammad al-Zawahiri.

According to the Jamestown profile, al-Banna acknowledged he had trained Abd al-Mun’im bin Izz al-Din al-Badawi in intelligence. Al-Badawi was to become head of intelligence for Al Qaeda in Iraq.

The Jamestown's profile challenged several aspects of the admissions in al-Banna's interrogation. They challenged the credibility of his claim that AQAP main source of weapons was a warlord in Sudan's wartorn Darfur region, because Darfur was a net importer of weapons, not an exporter. They challenged the credibility when he implicated Yemen's rebel Houthis, who are Shiite and al Qaeda are hardcore Sunnis.

== False death reports ==
Ibrahim al-Banna was reported to have been killed by gunmen from the Nour al-Din al-Zenki Movement in Syria on February 15, 2018, which was later proven to be false.

Since the U.S. did not confirm al-Banna's death, he remains the subject of a $5 million USD bounty by the Rewards for Justice Program.

== See also ==
- Osama bin Laden
- Khalid Batarfi
- List of fugitives from justice who disappeared
