= Ziyad Khaleel =

American al-Qaeda member

- Other names: Khalil Ziyad, Ziyad Sadaqa, and Ziyad Abdulrahman
- Citizenship: U.S.
- Education: Columbia College
- Known for: Al-Qaeda member, "procurement agent" for Osama bin Laden

Ziyad Khaleel, also known as Khalil Ziyad, Ziyad Sadaqa, and Ziyad Abdulrahman, was an American al-Qaeda member, based in the United States, primarily in Colorado, Florida, Michigan and Missouri. He had been identified as a "procurement agent" for Osama bin Laden, arranging the purchase and delivery of "computers, satellite telephones, and covert surveillance equipment" for the leadership of al-Qaeda, as well as administering a number of radical Islamic websites as webmaster, including the website of the Palestinian militant group Hamas. Among the cities in which he resided at various times were Denver, Detroit, Columbia and Orlando.

In 1991, while living in Denver, he was vice president of the Denver Islamic Society. By 1994 he was residing in Detroit and his name and address were reflected in ledgers taken from the Al Kifah Refugee Center, a financial and strategic arm of al-Qaeda.

Upon moving to Columbia, Missouri, he was known as Ziyad Khaleel, but began using the surname Sadaqa as early as 1996. That year he was a fundraiser and one of eight regional directors of the Islamic African Relief Agency (IARA), which the government later determined was a front for al-Qaeda and Hamas.

Late in 1996 he bought a $7,500 INMARSAT satellite telephone at the instruction of senior al-Qaeda lieutenant Khaled al-Fawwaz. He delivered the satellite telephone and a battery pack to bin Laden in Afghanistan in May 1998. Bin Laden used the phone to place phone calls around the world, directing al-Qaeda's operations and orchestrating the 1998 bombings of U.S. embassies in Kenya and Tanzania.

In 1998 and 1999, Khaleel lived in an apartment in the eastern part of Florida's Orange County, near Orlando.

The FBI investigated Anwar al-Awlaki, later linked to three of the 9/11 hijackers, the Fort Hood shooter, and the Christmas Day 2009 bomber, beginning in June 1999 through March 2000, after it learned he had been contacted by Khaleel.

On December 29, 1999, as he arrived in the Jordanian capital of Amman, local authorities arrested him on charges of being a procurement agent for bin Laden, but he was later released. In 2000 Khaleel lived in Manchester, Missouri, and attended Columbia College in St. Louis.

Khaleel is now dead.
