= Raid on Al Hathla =

2017 military operation

Coordinates: 14.598°N 45.060°E

- Part of the Yemeni Civil War (2014–present) and the war on terror
Date	23 May 2017
Location	Al Hathla, Ma'rib Governorate, Yemen
Result	American victory

Belligerents
United States	al-Qaeda in the Arabian Peninsula

Commanders and leaders
Unknown	Hashim Muhsin Aydarus al-Hamid; Khalid Ali Mabkhut al-Aradah

Units involved
DEVGRU	Al-Moradi clan tribesmen Loyal to AQAP; Al-Aadhal tribe, tribesmen loyal to AQAP

Strength
40–60 commandos, 1 Lockheed AC-130, three Boeing AH-64 Apache, two Military transport aircraft, 8-9 Attack helicopters	Unknown

Casualties and losses
Several wounded (according to US)	7 militants killed (according to US); None killed (according to local and tribal sources); 2+ killed (according to a human rights organization)
- 5 civilians killed and 6 wounded (according to local and tribal sources and a human rights organization); No civilians killed (according to US)

The raid on Al Hathla was a military operation launched by the United States military, against Al-Qaeda in the Arabian Peninsula forces in Ma'rib Governorate in Yemen on 23 May 2017. The attack occurred in an Al-Qaeda compound that was used as a training facility for new combatants.

== Background ==
The raid took place four days after the United States Department of State designated two tribal leaders from the province as global terrorists for supporting al-Qaeda in the Arabian Peninsula, named Hashim Muhsin Aydarus al-Hamid, and Khalid Ali Mabkhut al-Aradah. In the designation, Hamid was identified as "a tribal leader in Yemen" who "regularly acted as an AQAP facilitator by assisting in the provision of weapons and money for AQAP." Aradah was described as "a tribal sheikh and senior AQAP official in Yemen who facilitates financial support to AQAP, to include support to AQAP leadership." Aradah also "runs an AQAP camp".

== The raid ==
=== According to US ===
The raid started when U.S. Navy SEALs from DEVGRU, airlifted by helicopter to the central province of Marib, with the support of Yemeni authorities, attacked a compound on a residential block held by al-Qaeda fighters in the village of Al-Hathla. A firefight broke out, and a Lockheed AC-130 was called in. US officials said that several US soldiers were wounded during the battle, but none killed. According to US officials, US forces killed seven AQAP militants through a combination of small arms fire and precision airstrikes.

=== According to Tribal and local sources ===
According to reports in tribal and local Yemeni news websites and sources, at least thirty US soldiers, aided by Yemeni government soldiers, were deployed in the rural area of Al Hathla in the early hours of the day, and engaged in a gun battle with fighters from two prominent tribes in the village, Al-Moradi and Al-Aadhali. The reports said that during the ensuing fierce battle, at least seven US soldiers were killed. The reports added that no AQAP fighters had been in the area when three Boeing AH-64 Apache, and two Military transport aircraft of the US approached the village.

== Aim of the raid ==
US officials said that the aim of the raid was to seize potentially important information from the compound—typically electronic devices such as computers, hard drives and cellphones—and was not an attempt to kill or capture a particular individual. It is not known if US forces managed to seize the information they wanted.

== Casualties ==
According to Tribal sources, the raid killed no AQAP fighters, but did kill five civilians and wounded six others, from the Al-Moradi clan, conflicting with the US claim that they had killed seven fighters from the Al-Aadhal tribe. The claims of the tribal leaders have not been confirmed by the Yemeni government. No U.S. forces were killed, but an unknown number were wounded. The Pentagon would not provide specifics on the number of troops wounded or the types of injuries incurred, citing privacy concerns and not wanting to immediately broadcast a battle damage assessment to enemy forces in the region. The wounds sustained were ambulatory, meaning U.S. forces conducting the mission were able to take themselves off the battlefield, according to Pentagon spokesperson, Capt. Jeff Davis. Some reports indicate that two of the wounded Navy SEALs suffered injuries to their arms and were flown to a hospital in Djibouti. These reports were not confirmed by US officials.

=== Reprieve investigation ===
Reprieve, a London-based human rights group, said it had talked to two sources from the raided village, who said that the raid went wrong from the start as the Seals opened fire on a 70-year-old partially blind man, named Nasser Al-Adhal, who had come out of his house to see what was going on, possibly to greet the US soldiers after mistaking them for visitors. On hearing al-Adhal being shot, other men then emerged from their homes, and four of them were shot dead by the Seals, according to the Reprieve account. According to Reprive investigators, they were "still trying to get a really full picture of exactly what happened, but what we do know is that Seals landed in the village, and they appear to have been trying to target a group of possible militants but in the course of the ground raid something went wrong, and they ended up killing a number of the people from the village, including a man of about 70, Nasser al-Adhal, who suffered from very bad eyesight. The four other villagers were killed when they started to argue with the Navy Seals after the shooting of Nasser al-Adhal. Six villagers were seriously injured, including another elderly man who was around 69 years old. After that, Al-Qaida fighters gathered nearby, after were alerted by the gunshots in the village and firefight ensued in which at least two of them were killed. The Navy Seals then left with the help of air support from a helicopter." A US central command spokesman, Maj. Josh Jacques, said that the Reprieve report would be investigated.

=== The Intercept investigation ===
On May 28, The Intercept, an online news organization, published a report about the raid, which gathered reports of five different individuals who witnessed the raid. The eyewitnesses also claimed that civilians were killed, among them two young boys. Village residents gave a list of ten names of civilians killed and wounded during the raid. 15-year-old Abdullah Saeed Salem al Adhal was shot dead as he fled from his home with women and other children. Another child, 12-year-old Othman Mohammed Saleh al Adhal, was injured but survived. An additional seven men who were guests in one house in the village were also killed, according to a senior figure in al Adhlan. He was not able to identify the guests but they appear to account for the seven Al Qaeda militants that US forces claimed were killed.

== See also ==
- Raid on Yakla
