= Anwar al-Awlaki =

American-Yemeni Islamic cleric and lecturer (1971–2011)

Anwar al-Awlaki أنور العولقي
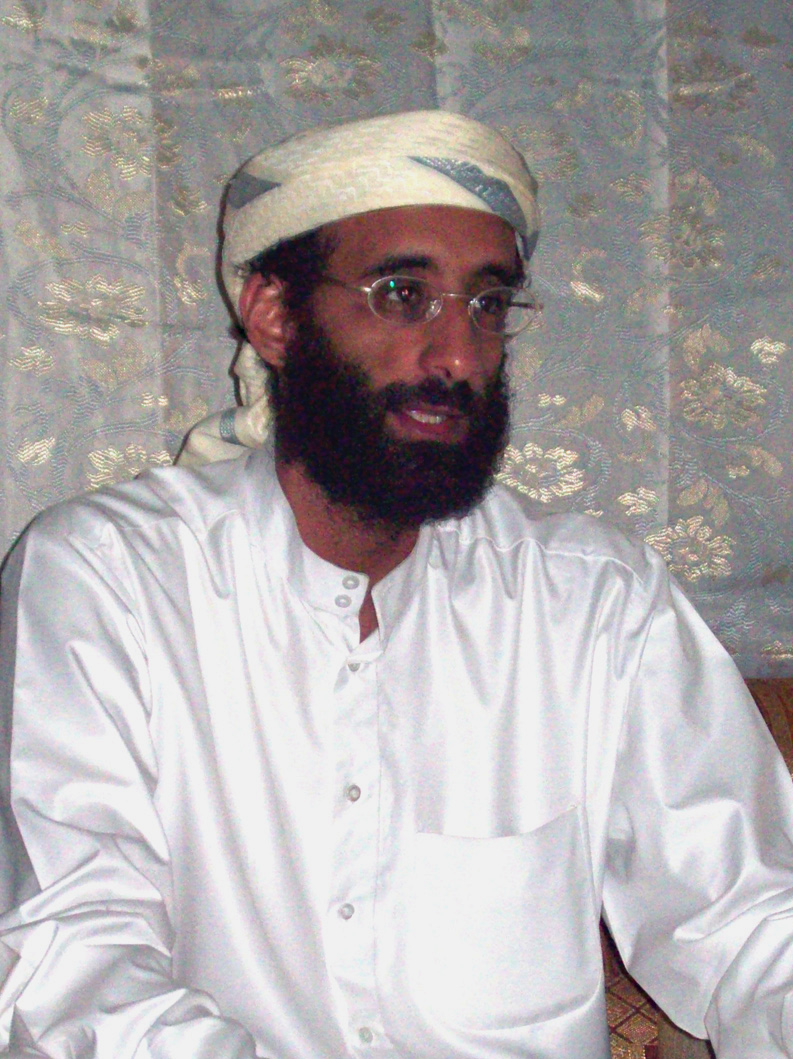
- Al-Awlaki in 2008
- Born: Anwar Nasser Abdulla al-Awlaki; April 21, 1971; Las Cruces, New Mexico, U.S.
- Died: September 30, 2011 (aged 40); Al Jawf Governorate, Yemen
- Cause of death: Assassination (Drone strike)
- Education: Colorado State University (BS); San Diego State University (MS); George Washington University
- Occupations: Lecturer; cleric; imam
- Known for: Lectures across Asia and the Middle East; Inspire magazine; and spokesman
- Children: 5 (including Abdulrahman and Nawar)
- Parent: Nasser al-Awlaki (father)

Anwar Nasser Abdulla al-Awlaki (Note: Arabic: أنور ناصر عبدالله العولقي, romanized: Anwar Nāṣir ‘Abd Allāh al-‘Awlaqī) (April 21, 1971 – September 30, 2011) was an American-Yemeni Islamic cleric, lecturer, and propagandist. He was assassinated in Yemen in 2011 by a U.S. drone strike ordered by President Barack Obama. Al-Awlaki was the first U.S. citizen to be targeted and assassinated by a U.S. government drone strike. Al-Awlaki, a dual citizen of the U.S. and Yemen, was a key organizer for the Islamist militant group al-Qaeda.

Al-Awlaki was born in Las Cruces, New Mexico, U.S., in 1971 to parents from Yemen. Growing up partly in the United States and partly in Yemen, he attended various U.S. universities in the 1990s and early 2000s. He also worked as an imam despite having no religious qualifications and almost no religious education. Al-Awlaki returned to Yemen in early 2004 and became a university lecturer after a brief stint as a public speaker in the United Kingdom. He was detained by Yemeni authorities in 2006 and spent 18 months in prison for allegedly kidnapping a Shiite teenager for ransom, and allegedly participating in an al-Qaeda plot to kidnap a U.S. military attaché, before being released without facing trial.

Following his release from Yemeni custody, Al-Awlaki had significantly radicalized, and began to speak overtly in support of violence, also condemning the U.S. government's foreign policy towards Muslims. He was linked to Nidal Hasan, the perpetrator of the 2009 Fort Hood shooting, and Umar Farouk Abdulmutallab, who attempted to detonate an underwear bomb on Northwest Airlines Flight 253. The Yemeni government tried al-Awlaki in absentia in November 2010 for plotting to kill foreigners and being a member of al-Qaeda. A Yemeni judge ordered that he be captured "dead or alive". U.S. officials said that in 2009, al-Awlaki was promoted to the rank of "regional commander" within al-Qaeda. He repeatedly called for jihad against the United States. In April 2010, al-Awlaki was placed on a CIA kill list by President Obama. Al-Awlaki's father and civil rights groups challenged the order in court. The U.S. deployed unmanned aircraft (drones) in Yemen to search for and kill him, firing at and failing to kill him at least once. Al-Awlaki was killed on September 30, 2011.

In June 2014, a previously classified memorandum from the U.S. Department of Justice was released; the memorandum described al-Awlaki's killing as a lawful act of war. Civil liberties advocates have called the killing of al-Awlaki an extrajudicial execution that breached al-Awlaki's constitutional rights. The New York Times wrote in 2015 that al-Awlaki's public statements and videos had been more influential in inspiring acts of Islamic terrorism in the wake of his killing than they were before his death.

== Early life ==
Anwar al-Awlaki was born in Las Cruces, New Mexico, in 1971 to parents from Yemen, while his father, Nasser al-Awlaki, was doing graduate work at U.S. universities. His father was a Fulbright Scholar who earned a master's degree in agricultural economics at New Mexico State University in 1971, received a doctorate at the University of Nebraska–Lincoln, and worked at the University of Minnesota from 1975 to 1977. Nasser al-Awlaki served as Agriculture Minister in Ali Abdullah Saleh's government. He was also President of Sana'a University. Yemen's prime minister from 2007 to 2011, Ali Mohammed Mujur, was a relative.

The family returned to Yemen in 1978, when al-Awlaki was seven years old. He lived there for 11 years, and studied at Azal Modern School.

== Life in the United States, 1990–2002 ==
=== Education ===
Around 1990, al-Awlaki went to the U.S. to attend college, paid for by USAID, which covered all expenses. He earned a B.S. in civil engineering from Colorado State University (1994), where he was president of the Muslim Student Association. In 1993, while still a college student in Colorado State's civil engineering program, al-Awlaki visited Afghanistan in the aftermath of the Soviet occupation. He spent some time training with the mujahideen who had fought the Soviets. He was depressed by the country's poverty and hunger, and "wouldn't have gone with al-Qaeda", according to friends from Colorado State, who said he was profoundly affected by the trip. Mullah Mohammed Omar did not form the Taliban until 1994. When Al-Awlaki returned to campus, he showed increased interest in religion and politics. Al-Awlaki studied Education Leadership at San Diego State University, earning a master's degree. He worked on a doctorate in Human Resource Development at The George Washington University Graduate School of Education and Human Development in 2001.

=== Time as imam ===
In 1994, al-Awlaki married a cousin from Yemen, and began service as a part-time imam of the Denver Islamic Society. In 1996, he was chastised by an elder for encouraging a Saudi student to fight in Chechnya against the Russians. He left Denver soon after, moving to San Diego.

From 1996 to 2000, al-Awlaki was imam of the Masjid Ar-Ribat al-Islami mosque in San Diego, California, where he had a following of 200–300 people. U.S. officials later alleged that Nawaf al-Hazmi and Khalid al-Mihdhar, hijackers of American Airlines Flight 77, attended his sermons and personally met him during this period, although Al-Awlaki told authorities their conversations were trivial in nature. Hazmi later lived in Northern Virginia and attended al-Awlaki's mosque there. The 9/11 Commission Report said that the hijackers "reportedly respected [al-Awlaki] as a religious figure". While in San Diego, al-Awlaki volunteered with youth organizations, fished, discussed his travels with friends, and created a popular and lucrative series of recorded lectures.

In 1998 and 1999, he served as vice-president for the Charitable Society for Social Welfare. Although the FBI investigated al-Awlaki from June 1999 through March 2000 for possible links to Hamas, the Bin Laden contact Ziyad Khaleel, and a visit by an associate of Omar Abdel Rahman, it did not find sufficient evidence for a criminal prosecution. In 2004, the FBI described this group as a "front organization to funnel money to terrorists". Al-Awlaki told reporters that he resigned from leading the San Diego mosque "after an uneventful four years," and took a brief sabbatical, traveling overseas to various countries.

Al-Awlaki decided to pursue his PhD and was accepted at George Washington University in Washington, D.C., and was soon recruited to be the imam of the nearby suburban Dar al-Hijrah mosque in 2000. One of the mosque's board members who hired Al-Awlaki stated he was convinced that al-Awlaki had no inclinations or activities to do with terrorism. The new imam, who was described as alluring and charming at this time, began to draw young people to Dar Al-Hijrah while connecting with the sophisticated Muslim community of Northern Virginia. His proficiency as a public speaker and command of the English language helped him attract followers who did not speak Arabic. "He was the magic bullet", according to the mosque spokesman Johari Abdul-Malik. "He had everything all in a box." Al-Awlaki was considered a moderate during his time at Dar Al-Hijrah, publicly condemned the September 11 attacks and al-Qaeda, was even invited to speak at the United States Department of Defense and became the first imam to conduct a prayer service for the Congressional Muslim Staffer Association at the U.S. Capitol. He led academic discussions frequented by FBI Director of Counter-Intelligence for the Middle East Gordon M. Snow. Al-Awlaki also served as the Muslim chaplain at George Washington University. Soon after the 9/11 attacks, al-Awlaki was sought in Washington, D.C., by the media to answer questions about Islam, its rituals, and its relation to the attacks. He was interviewed by National Geographic, The New York Times, and other media. Al-Awlaki condemned the attacks. According to an NPR report in 2010, in 2001 al-Awlaki appeared to be a moderate who could "bridge the gap between the United States and the worldwide community of Muslims." The New York Times said at the time that he was "held up as a new generation of Muslim leader capable of merging East and West." In 2010, Fox News and the New York Daily News reported that some months after the 9/11 attacks, a Pentagon employee invited al-Awlaki to a luncheon in the Secretary's Office of General Counsel. The U.S. secretary of the Army had suggested that a moderate Muslim be invited to give a talk.

There is no way that the people who did this could be Muslim, and if they claim to be Muslim, then they have perverted their religion.

— Anwar al-Awlaki on the 9/11 hijackers

Al-Awlaki appeared on law enforcement's radars when federal investigators discovered two of the alleged 9/11 hijackers had attended the same mosque in San Diego during the same time Al-Awlaki served as imam, as well as Dar Al-Hijrah (along with a third alleged hijacker). When police investigating the 9/11 attacks raided the Hamburg apartment of Ramzi bin al-Shibh, they found the telephone number of al-Awlaki among bin al-Shibh's personal contacts. Six days after the 9/11 attacks, al-Awlaki suggested in writing on the IslamOnline.net website that Israeli intelligence agents might have been responsible for the attacks, and that the FBI "went into the roster of the airplanes, and whoever has a Muslim or Arab name became the hijacker by default". The FBI interviewed al-Awlaki four times in the eight days following the 9/11 attacks. FBI agents conducted repeated interviews and placed the imam under surveillance. Although some law enforcement and public officials have been outspoken about their suspicions of Al-Awlaki's role in the 9/11 plot, no solid evidence emerged linking him to the plot. Al-Awlaki resigned from Dar Al-Hijrah in early 2002 due to post-9/11 media attention that distracted the imam from his duties, according to the mosque's outreach director.

Later in 2002, al-Awlaki posted an essay in Arabic on the Islam Today website titled "Why Muslims Love Death", lauding the fervor of Palestinian suicide bombers. He expressed a similar opinion in a speech at a London mosque later that year. By July 2002, al-Awlaki was under investigation in the United States for having received money from the subject of a U.S. Joint Terrorism Task Force investigation. His name was added to the list of terrorism suspects.

=== Passport fraud issues ===
In June 2002, a Denver federal judge signed an arrest warrant for al-Awlaki for passport fraud. On October 9, the Denver U.S. Attorney's Office filed a motion to dismiss the complaint and vacate the arrest warrant. Prosecutors believed that they lacked sufficient evidence of a crime, according to U.S. Attorney Dave Gaouette, who authorized its withdrawal. Al-Awlaki had listed Yemen rather than the United States as his place of birth on his 1990 application for a U.S. Social Security number, soon after arriving in the US. Al-Awlaki used this documentation to obtain a passport in 1993. He later corrected his place of birth to Las Cruces, New Mexico. "The bizarre thing is if you put Yemen down (on the application), it would be harder to get a Social Security number than to say you are a native-born citizen of Las Cruces", Gaouette said.

Prosecutors could not charge him in October 2002, when he returned from a trip abroad, because a 10-year statute of limitations on lying to the Social Security Administration had expired. According to a 2012 investigative report by Fox News, the arrest warrant for passport fraud was still in effect on the morning of October 10, 2002, when FBI agent Wade Ammerman ordered al-Awlaki's release. U.S. congressman Frank Wolf (R-VA) and several congressional committees urged FBI director Robert Mueller to provide an explanation about the bureau's interactions with al-Awlaki, including why he was released from federal custody when there was an outstanding warrant for his arrest. The motion for rescinding the arrest warrant was approved by a magistrate judge on October 10 and filed on October 11.

ABC News reported in 2009 that the Joint Terrorism Task Force in San Diego disagreed with the decision to cancel the warrant. They were monitoring al-Awlaki and wanted to "look at him under a microscope". But U.S. Attorney Gaouette said that no objection had been raised to the rescinding of the warrant during a meeting that included Ray Fournier, the San Diego federal diplomatic security agent whose allegation had set in motion the effort to obtain a warrant. Gaouette said that if al-Awlaki had been convicted at the time, he would have faced about six months in custody.

The New York Times suggested later that al-Awlaki had claimed birth in Yemen (his family's place of origin) to qualify for scholarship money granted to foreign citizens. U.S. congressman Frank R. Wolf (R-VA) wrote in May 2010 that by claiming to be foreign-born, al-Awlaki fraudulently obtained more than $20,000 in scholarship funds reserved for foreign students.

While living in Northern Virginia, al-Awlaki visited Ali al-Timimi, later known as a radical Islamic cleric. Al-Timimi was convicted in 2005 serving a life sentence for leading the Virginia Jihad Network, inciting Muslim followers to fight with the Taliban against the U.S. As of January 2026, his conviction was overturned by the Fourth Circuit Court of Appeals and Ali al-Timimi has been released from federal prison.

== In the United Kingdom, 2002–2004 ==
Al-Awlaki left the United States before the end of 2002, because of a "climate of fear and intimidation" according to Imam Johari Abdul-Malik of the Dar al-Hijrah mosque.

He lived in the UK for several months, where he gave talks attended by up to 200 people. He urged young Muslim followers: "The important lesson to learn here is never, ever trust the kuffar [disbeliever]. Do not trust them! [Their leaders] are plotting to kill this religion. They're plotting night and day."

He gave a series of lectures in December 2002 and January 2003 at the London Masjid al-Tawhid mosque, describing the rewards martyrs (Shahid) receive in paradise (Jannah). He began to gain supporters, particularly among young Muslims, and undertook a lecture tour of England and Scotland in 2002 in conjunction with the Muslim Association of Britain. He also lectured at "ExpoIslamia", an event held by Islamic Forum Europe. At the East London Mosque he told his audience: "A Muslim is a brother of a Muslim... he does not betray him, and he does not hand him over... You don't hand over a Muslim to the enemies."

In the UK's Parliament in 2003, Louise Ellman, MP for Liverpool Riverside, discussed the relationship between al-Awlaki and the Muslim Association of Britain, a Muslim Brotherhood front organization founded by Kamal el-Helbawy, a senior member of the Egyptian Muslim Brotherhood.

== Return to Yemen, 2004–2011 ==
Al-Awlaki returned to Yemen in early 2004, where he lived in Shabwah Governorate with his wife and five children. He lectured at Iman University, headed by Abdul Majeed al-Zindani. The latter has been included on the UN 1267 Committee's list of individuals belonging to or associated with al-Qaeda. Al-Zindani denied having any influence over al-Awlaki, or that he had been his "direct teacher". Some believe that the school's curriculum deals mostly, if not exclusively, with radical Islamic studies, and promotes radicalism. American convert John Walker Lindh and other alumni have been associated with militant groups.

On August 31, 2006, al-Awlaki was arrested with four others on charges of kidnapping a Shiite teenager for ransom, and participating in an al-Qaeda plot to kidnap a U.S. military attaché. He was imprisoned in 2006 and 2007. He was interviewed around September 2007 by two FBI agents with regard to the 9/11 attacks and other subjects. John Negroponte, the U.S. Director of National Intelligence, told Yemeni officials he did not object to al-Awlaki's detention.

His name was on a list of 100 prisoners whose release was sought by al-Qaeda-linked militants in Yemen. After 18 months in a Yemeni prison, al-Awlaki was released on December 12, 2007, following the intercession of his tribe. According to a Yemeni security official, he was released because he had repented. He moved to his family home in Saeed, a hamlet in the Shabwa mountains.

Moazzam Begg's Cageprisoners, an organization representing former Guantanamo detainees, campaigned for al-Awlaki's release when he was in prison in Yemen. Al-Awlaki told Begg in an interview shortly after his release that prior to his incarceration in Yemen, he had condemned the 9/11 attacks.

In December 2008, al-Awlaki sent a communique to the Somali militant group, al-Shabaab, congratulating them.

"He's the most dangerous man in Yemen. He's intelligent, sophisticated, Internet-savvy, and very charismatic. He can sell anything to anyone, and right now he's selling jihad".

— Yemeni official familiar with counterterrorism operations

Al-Awlaki provided al-Qaeda members in Yemen with the protection of his powerful tribe, the Awlakis, against the government. The tribal code required it to protect those who seek refuge and assistance. This imperative has greater force when the person is a member of the tribe or a tribesman's friend. The tribe's motto is "We are the sparks of Hell; whoever interferes with us will be burned." Al-Awlaki also reportedly helped negotiate deals with leaders of other tribes.

Sought by Yemeni authorities who were investigating his al-Qaeda ties, al-Awlaki went into hiding in approximately March 2009, according to his father. By December 2009, al-Awlaki was on the Yemeni government's most-wanted list. He was believed to be hiding in Yemen's Shabwa or Mareb regions, which are part of the so-called "triangle of evil". The area has attracted al-Qaeda militants, who seek refuge among local tribes unhappy with Yemen's central government.

Yemeni sources originally said al-Awlaki might have been killed in a pre-dawn air strike by Yemeni Air Force fighter jets on a meeting of senior al-Qaeda leaders at a hideout in Rafd in eastern Shabwa, on December 24, 2009. But he survived. Pravda reported that the planes, using Saudi and U.S. intelligence, killed at least 30 al-Qaeda members from Yemen and abroad, and that an al-Awlaki house was "raided and demolished". On December 28 The Washington Post reported that U.S. and Yemeni officials said that al-Awlaki had been present at the meeting. Abdul Elah al-Shaya, a Yemeni journalist, said al-Awlaki called him on December 28 to report that he was well and had not attended the al-Qaeda meeting. Al-Shaya said that al-Awlaki was not tied to al-Qaeda.

In March 2010, a tape featuring al-Awlaki was released in which he urged Muslims residing in the United States to attack their country of residence.

=== Reaching out to the United Kingdom ===
After 2006, al-Awlaki was banned from entering the United Kingdom. He broadcast lectures to mosques and other venues there via video-link from 2007 to 2009, on at least seven occasions at five locations in Britain. Noor Pro Media Events held a conference at the East London Mosque on January 1, 2009, showing a videotaped lecture by al-Awlaki; former Shadow Home Secretary Dominic Grieve expressed concern over his being featured.

He gave video-link talks in England to an Islamic student society at the University of Westminster in September 2008, an arts center in East London in April 2009 (after the Tower Hamlets council gave its approval), worshippers at the Al Huda Mosque in Bradford, and a dinner of the Cageprisoners organization in September 2008 at the Wandsworth Civic Centre in South London. On August 23, 2009, al-Awlaki was banned by local authorities in Kensington and Chelsea, London, from speaking at Kensington Town Hall via videolink to a fundraiser dinner for Guantanamo detainees promoted by Cageprisoners. His videos, which discuss his Islamist theories, have circulated across the United Kingdom. Until February 2010, hundreds of audio tapes of his sermons were available at the Tower Hamlets public libraries. In 2009, the London-based Islam Channel carried advertisements for his DVDs and at least two of his video conference lectures.

=== Other connections ===
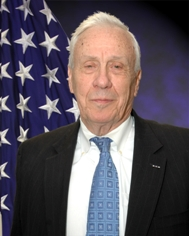
In 2008, Charles E. Allen, former U.S. Under-Secretary for Homeland Security, publicly warned that al-Awlaki allegedly was targeting Muslims with online lectures encouraging terrorist attacks.

FBI agents identified al-Awlaki as a known, important "senior recruiter for al Qaeda", and a spiritual motivator. His name came up in a dozen terrorism plots in the US, UK, and Canada. The cases included suicide bombers in the 2005 London bombings, jihadists in the 2006 Toronto terrorism case, jihadists in the 2007 Fort Dix attack plot, the killer in the 2009 Little Rock recruiting office shooting, and the 2010 Times Square bomber. In each case the suspects were devoted to al-Awlaki's message, which they listened to online and on CDs.

Al-Awlaki's recorded lectures were heard by Islamist fundamentalists in at least six terror cells in the UK through 2009. Michael Finton (Talib Islam), who attempted in September 2009 to bomb the Federal Building and the adjacent offices of Congressman Aaron Schock in Springfield, Illinois, admired al-Awlaki and quoted him on his Myspace page. In addition to his website, al-Awlaki had a Facebook fan page with "fans" in the US, many of whom were high school students. Al-Awlaki also set up a website and blog on which he shared his views.

Al-Awlaki influenced several other extremists to join militant organizations overseas and to carry out terrorist attacks in their home countries. Mohamed Alessa and Carlos Almonte, two American citizens from New Jersey who attempted to travel to Somalia in June 2010 to join the al-Qaeda-linked militant group Al Shabaab, allegedly watched several al-Awlaki videos and sermons in which he warned of future attacks against Americans in the United States and abroad. Zachary Chesser, an American citizen who was arrested for attempting to provide material support to Al Shabaab, told federal authorities that he watched online videos featuring al-Awlaki and that he exchanged several e-mails with al-Awlaki. In July 2010, Paul Rockwood was sentenced to eight years in prison for creating a list of 15 potential targets in the US, people he felt had desecrated Islam. Rockwood was a devoted follower of al-Awlaki, and had studied his works Constants on the Path to Jihad and 44 Ways to Jihad.

In October 2008, Charles Allen, U.S. Under-Secretary of Homeland Security for Intelligence and Analysis, warned that al-Awlaki "targets U.S. Muslims with radical online lectures encouraging terrorist attacks from his new home in Yemen." Responding to Allen, al-Awlaki wrote on his website in December 2008: "I would challenge him to come up with just one such lecture where I encourage 'terrorist attacks'".

==== Fort Hood shooter ====
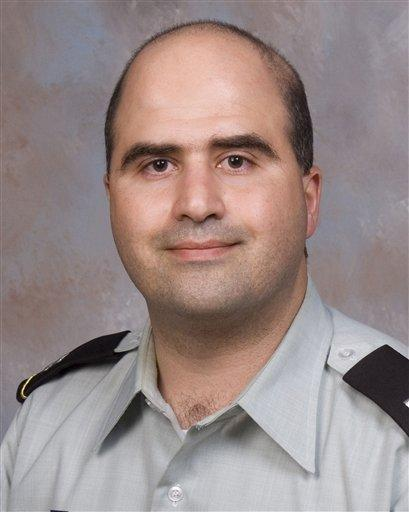
Convicted Fort Hood shooter Nidal Hasan

Nidal Hasan, an Army Medical Corps psychiatrist, visited al-Awlaki's mosque for his mother's funeral, at which al-Awlaki presided in 2002. Hasan usually attended a mosque in Maryland closer to where he lived while working at the Walter Reed Medical Center (2003–09). He was investigated by the FBI after intelligence agencies intercepted at least 18 e-mails between him and al-Awlaki between December 2008 and June 2009. Even before the contents of the e-mails were revealed, terrorism expert Jarret Brachman said that Hasan's contacts with al-Awlaki should have raised "huge red flags", because of his influence on radical English-speaking jihadis. Charles Allen, no longer in government, noted that there was no work-related reason for Hasan to be in touch with al-Awlaki. Former CIA officer Bruce Riedel opined: "E-mailing a known al-Qaeda sympathizer should have set off alarm bells. Even if he was exchanging recipes, the bureau should have put out an alert." A DC-based Joint Terrorism Task Force operating under the FBI was notified of the e-mails and reviewed the information. Army employees were informed of the e-mails, but they didn't perceive any terrorist threat in Hasan's questions. Instead, they viewed them as general questions about spiritual guidance with regard to conflicts between Islam and military service and judged them to be consistent with legitimate mental health research about Muslims in the armed services. The assessment was that there was not sufficient information for a larger investigation. In one of the e-mails, Hasan wrote al-Awlaki: "I can't wait to join you [in the afterlife]". "It sounds like code words," said Lt. Col. Tony Shaffer, a military analyst at the Center for Advanced Defense Studies. "That he's actually either offering himself up, or that he's already crossed that line in his own mind."

Yemeni journalist Abdulelah Hider Shaea interviewed al-Awlaki in November 2009. Al-Awlaki acknowledged his correspondence with Hasan. He said he "neither ordered nor pressured ... Hasan to harm Americans." Al-Awlaki said Hasan first e-mailed him December 17, 2008, introducing himself by writing: "Do you remember me? I used to pray with you at the Virginia mosque." Hasan said he had become a devout Muslim around the time al-Awlaki was preaching at Dar al-Hijrah, in 2001 and 2002, and al-Awlaki said 'Maybe Nidal was affected by one of my lectures.'" He added: "It was clear from his e-mails that Nidal trusted me. Nidal told me: 'I speak with you about issues that I never speak with anyone else.'" Al-Awlaki said Hasan arrived at his own conclusions regarding the acceptability of violence in Islam and said he was not the one to initiate this. Shaea said, "Nidal was providing evidence to Anwar, not vice versa."

Asked whether Hasan mentioned Fort Hood as a target in his e-mails, Shaea declined to comment. Al-Awlaki said the shooting was acceptable in Islam, however, because it was a form of jihad, as the West began the hostilities with the Muslims. Al-Awlaki said he "blessed the act because it was against a military target. And the soldiers who were killed were ... those who were trained and prepared to go to Iraq and Afghanistan".

Al-Awlaki's e-mail conversations with Hasan were not released, and he was not placed on the FBI Most Wanted list, indicted for treason, or officially named as a co-conspirator with Hasan. The U.S. government was reluctant to classify the Fort Hood shooting as a terrorist incident, or identify any motive. The Wall Street Journal reported in January 2010 that al-Awlaki had not "played a direct role" in any of the attacks, and noted he had never been charged with a crime in the US.

One of his fellow officers at Fort Hood said Hasan was enthusiastic about al-Awlaki. Some investigators believe al-Awlaki's teachings may have been instrumental in Hasan's decision to stage the attack. On his now-disabled website, al-Awlaki praised Hasan's actions, describing him as a hero.

==== Christmas Day "Underwear Bomber" ====
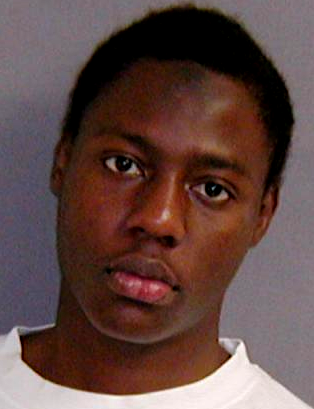
Umar Farouk Abdulmutallab, the Northwest Airlines Flight 253 suspected bomber

According to a number of sources, Al-Awlaki and Umar Farouk Abdulmutallab, the convicted al-Qaeda attempted bomber of Northwest Airlines Flight 253 on December 25, 2009, had contact. In January 2010, CNN reported that U.S. "security sources" said that there is concrete evidence that al-Awlaki was Abdulmutallab's recruiter and one of his trainers, and met with him prior to the attack. In February 2010, al-Awlaki admitted in an interview published in al-Jazeera that he taught and corresponded with Abdulmutallab, but denied having ordered the attack.

Representative Pete Hoekstra, the senior Republican on the House Intelligence Committee, said officials in the Obama administration and officials with access to law enforcement information told him the suspect "may have had contact [with al-Awlaki]".

The Sunday Times established that Abdulmutallab first met al-Awlaki in 2005 in Yemen, while he was studying Arabic. During that time the suspect attended lectures by al-Awlaki.

NPR reported that according to unnamed U.S. intelligence officials he attended a sermon by al-Awlaki at the Finsbury Park Mosque. Khalid Mahmood, the Labour MP for Birmingham Perry Barr, a former trustee of the mosque, expressed "grave misgivings" with regard to its stewardship. A spokesperson of the mosque stated that al-Awlaki had never spoken there or had even to his knowledge entered the building.

Abdulmutallab was also reported by CBS News, The Daily Telegraph, and The Sunday Telegraph to have attended a talk by al-Awlaki at the East London Mosque, which al-Awlaki may have attended by video teleconference. The Sunday Telegraph later removed the report from its website following a complaint by the East London Mosque, which stated that "Anwar Al Awlaki did not deliver any talks at the ELM between 2005 and 2008, which is when the newspaper had falsely alleged that Abdullmutallab had attended such talks".

Investigators who searched flats connected to Abdulmutallab in London said that he was a "big fan" of al-Awlaki, as al-Awlaki's blog and website had repeatedly been visited from those locations.

According to federal sources, Abdulmutallab and al-Awlaki repeatedly communicated with one another in the year prior to the attack. "Voice-to-voice communication" between the two was intercepted during the fall of 2009, and one government source said al-Awlaki "was in some way involved in facilitating [Abdulmutallab]'s transportation or trip through Yemen. It could be training, a host of things." NPR reported that intelligence officials suspected al-Awlaki may have told Abdulmutallab to go to Yemen for al-Qaeda training.

Abdulmutallab told the FBI that al-Awlaki was one of his al-Qaeda trainers in Yemen. Others reported that Abdulmutallab met with al-Awlaki in the weeks leading up to the attack. The Los Angeles Times reported that according to a U.S. intelligence official, intercepts and other information point to connections between the two:

Some of the information ... comes from Abdulmutallab, who ... said that he met with al-Awlaki and senior al-Qaeda members during an extended trip to Yemen this year and that the cleric was involved in some elements of planning or preparing the attack and in providing religious justification for it. Other intelligence linking the two became apparent after the attempted bombing, including communications intercepted by the National Security Agency indicating that the cleric was meeting with "a Nigerian" in preparation for some kind of operation.

Yemen's Deputy Prime Minister for Defense and Security Affairs, Rashad Mohammed al-Alimi, said Yemeni investigators believe that Abdulmutallab traveled to Shabwa in October 2009. Investigators believe he obtained his explosives and received training there. He met there with al-Qaeda members in a house built by al-Awlaki. A top Yemen government official said the two met with each other.

In January 2010, al-Awlaki acknowledged that he met and spoke with Abdulmutallab in Yemen in the fall of 2009. In an interview, al-Awlaki said: "Umar Farouk is one of my students; I had communications with him. And I support what he did." He also said: "I did not tell him to do this operation, but I support it". Fox News reported in early February 2010 that Abdulmutallab told federal investigators that al-Awlaki directed him to carry out the bombing.

In June 2010 Michael Leiter, the Director of the U.S. National Counterterrorism Center (NCTC), said al-Awlaki had a "direct operational role" in the plot.

==== Sharif Mobley ====
Sharif Mobley had acknowledged contact with Anwar al-Awlaki. The Mobley family claims the contact was for spiritual guidance in further studies of Islam.

The Mobley family went to Yemen and resided there for several years. They decided to return to the United States and went to the U.S. Embassy to update the family travel documents. While waiting for their travel documents, Sharif Mobley was kidnapped by Yemen Security Services and shot on January 26, 2010. He was then held in Yemen's Central Prison. Mobley disappeared from the Central Prison on February 27, 2014. His current location is known to the U.S. Embassy in Yemen (currently closed 2015) but is withheld from his family and legal advisers based on U.S. State Department Regulations on "U.S. Citizens Missing Abroad".

All charges related to "terrorism/terrorist activity" were dropped by the Yemen government. There are no charges relating to allegations of "killing a guard during an escape attempt from the hospital" and there are no other legal proceedings against him in Yemen.

==== Times Square bomber ====
Faisal Shahzad, convicted of the 2010 Times Square car bombing attempt, told interrogators that he was a "fan and follower" of al-Awlaki, and his writings were one of the inspirations for the attack. On May 6, 2010 ABC News reported that unknown sources told them Shahzad made contact with al-Awlaki over the internet, a claim that could not be independently verified.

==== Stabbing of British former minister Stephen Timms ====
Roshonara Choudhry, who stabbed former British Cabinet Minister Stephen Timms in May 2010, and was found guilty of his attempted murder in November 2010, claimed to have become radicalized by listening to online sermons of al-Awlaki.

==== Seattle Weekly cartoonist death threat ====
In 2010, after Everybody Draw Mohammed Day, cartoonist Molly Norris at Seattle Weekly had to stop publishing, and at the suggestion of the FBI changed her name, moved, and went into hiding due to a fatwā issued by al-Awlaki calling for her death. In the June 2010 issue of Inspire, an English-language al-Qaeda magazine, al-Awlaki cursed her and eight others for "blasphemous caricatures" of Muhammad. "The medicine prescribed by the Messenger of Allah is the execution of those involved", he wrote. Daniel Pipes observed in an article entitled "Dueling Fatwas", "Awlaki stands at an unprecedented crossroads of death declarations, with his targeting Norris even as the U.S. government targets him."

==== Cargo planes bomb plot ====
The Guardian, The New York Times, and The Daily Telegraph reported that U.S. and British counter-terrorism officials believed that al-Awlaki was behind the cargo plane PETN bombs that were sent from Yemen to Chicago in October 2010. When U.S. Homeland Security official John Brennan was asked about al-Awlaki's suspected involvement in the plot, he said: "Anybody associated with al-Qaeda in the Arabian Peninsula is a subject of concern." U.S. Ambassador to Yemen Gerald Feierstein said "al-Awlaki was behind the two bombs."

== Final years ==
Al-Awlaki's father, tribe, and supporters denied his alleged associations with Al-Qaeda and Islamist terrorism. Al-Awlaki's father proclaimed his son's innocence in an interview with CNN's Paula Newton, saying: "I am now afraid of what they will do with my son. He's not Osama bin Laden, they want to make something out of him that he's not." Responding to a Yemeni official's assertions that his son had taken refuge with al-Qaeda, Nasser said: "He's dead wrong. What do you expect my son to do? There are missiles raining down on the village. He has to hide. But he is not hiding with al-Qaeda; our tribe is protecting him right now."

The Yemeni government attempted to get the tribal leaders to release al-Awlaki to their custody. They promised they would not turn him over to U.S. authorities for questioning. The governor of Shabwa said in January 2010 that al-Awlaki was on the move with members of al-Qaeda, including Fahd al-Quso, who was wanted in connection with the bombing of the USS Cole.

In January 2010, White House lawyers debated whether or not it was legal to kill al-Awlaki, given his U.S. citizenship. U.S. officials stated that international law allows targeted killing in the event that the subject is an "imminent threat". Because he was a U.S. citizen, his killing had to be approved by the National Security Council. Such action against a U.S. citizen is extremely rare. As a military enemy of the US, al-Awlaki was not subject to Executive Order 11905, which bans assassination for political reasons. The authorization was nevertheless controversial.

By February 4, 2010, the New York Daily News reported that al-Awlaki was "now on a targeting list signed off on by the Obama administration". On April 6, The New York Times reported that President Obama had authorized the killing of al-Awlaki.

"Terrorist No. 1, in terms of threat against us."

— Representative Jane Harman, (D-CA), Chairwoman of House Subcommittee on Homeland Security

The al-Awlaki tribe responded: "We warn against cooperating with America to kill Sheikh Anwar al-Awlaki. We will not stand by idly and watch." Al-Awlaki's tribe wrote that it would "not remain with arms crossed if a hair of Anwar al-Awlaki is touched, or if anyone plots or spies against him. Whoever risks denouncing our son (Awlaki) will be the target of al-Awlaki weapons", and gave warning "against co-operating with the Americans" in the capture or killing of al-Awlaki. Abu Bakr al-Qirbi, the Yemeni foreign minister, announced that the Yemeni government had not received any evidence from the US, and that "Anwar al-Awlaki has always been looked at as a preacher rather than a terrorist and shouldn't be considered as a terrorist unless the Americans have evidence that he has been involved in terrorism".

"al-Awlaki is the most dangerous ideologue in the world. Unlike bin Laden and al-Zawahiri, he doesn't need subtitles on his videos to indoctrinate and influence young people in the West."

— Sajjan M. Gohel, Asia-Pacific Foundation

In a video clip bearing the imprint of al-Qaeda in the Arabian Peninsula, issued on April 16 in al-Qaeda's monthly magazine Sada Al-Malahem, al-Awlaki said: "What am I accused of? Of calling for the truth? Of calling for jihad for the sake of Allah? Of calling to defend the causes of the Islamic nation?" In the video he also praises both Abdulmutallab and Hasan, and describes both as his "students".

In late April, Representative Charlie Dent (R-PA) introduced a resolution urging the U.S. State Department to withdraw al-Awlaki's U.S. citizenship. By May, U.S. officials believed he had become directly involved in terrorist activities. Former colleague Abdul-Malik said he "is a terrorist, in my book", and advised shops not to carry any of his publications. In an editorial, Investor's Business Daily called al-Awlaki the "world's most dangerous man", and recommended that he be added to the FBI's most-wanted terrorist list, a bounty put on his head, that he be designated a Specially Designated Global Terrorist, charged with treason, and extradition papers filed with the Yemeni government. IBD criticized the Justice Department for stonewalling Senator Joe Lieberman's security panel's investigation of al-Awlaki's role in the Fort Hood massacre.

On July 16, the U.S. Treasury Department added him to its list of Specially Designated Global Terrorists. Stuart Levey, Under Secretary of the Treasury for Terrorism and Financial Intelligence, called him "extraordinarily dangerous", and said al-Awlaki was involved in several organizational aspects of terrorism, including recruiting, training, fundraising, and planning individual attacks.

A few days later, the United Nations Security Council placed al-Awlaki on its UN Security Council Resolution 1267 list of individuals associated with al-Qaeda, describing him as a leader, recruiter, and trainer for al-Qaeda in the Arabian Peninsula. The resolution stipulates that U.N. members must freeze the assets of anyone on the list, and prevent them from travelling or obtaining weapons. The following week, Canadian banks were ordered to seize any assets belonging to al-Awlaki. The Royal Canadian Mounted Police's senior counter-terrorism officer Gilles Michaud described him as a "major, major factor in radicalization". In September 2010, Jonathan Evans, the Director General of the United Kingdom's domestic security and counter-intelligence agency (MI5), said that al-Awlaki was the West's Public Enemy No 1.

In October 2010, U.S. Congressman Anthony Weiner (D-NY) urged YouTube to take down al-Awlaki's videos from its website, saying that by hosting al-Awlaki's messages, "We are facilitating the recruitment of homegrown terror." Pauline Neville-Jones, British security minister, said "These Web sites ... incite cold-blooded murder." YouTube began removing the material in November 2010.

Al-Awlaki was charged in absentia in Sana'a, Yemen, on November 2 with plotting to kill foreigners and being a member of al-Qaeda. Ali al-Saneaa, the head of the prosecutor's office, announced the charges during the trial of Hisham Assem, who had been accused of killing Jacques Spagnolo, an oil industry worker. He said that al-Awlaki and Assem had been in contact for months, and that al-Awlaki had encouraged Assem to commit terrorism. Al-Awlaki's lawyer said that his client was not connected to Spagnolo's death. On November 6, Yemeni Judge Mohsen Alwan ordered that al-Awlaki be caught "dead or alive".

In his book Ticking Time Bomb: Counter-Terrorism Lessons from the U.S. Government's Failure to Prevent the Fort Hood Attack (2011), former U.S. Senator Joe Lieberman described al-Awlaki, Australian Muslim preacher Feiz Mohammad, Muslim cleric Abdullah el-Faisal, and Pakistani-American Samir Khan as "virtual spiritual sanctioners" who use the internet to offer religious justification for Islamist terrorism.

== Lawsuit against the US ==
In July 2010, al-Awlaki's father, Nasser al-Awlaki, contacted the Center for Constitutional Rights and the American Civil Liberties Union to represent his son in a lawsuit that sought to remove Anwar from the targeted killing list. ACLU's Jameel Jaffer said:

[T]he United States is not at war in Yemen, and the government doesn't have a blank check to kill terrorism suspects wherever they are in the world. Among the arguments we'll be making is that, outside actual war zones, the authority to use lethal force is narrowly circumscribed, and preserving the rule of law depends on keeping this authority narrow.

Lawyers for Specially Designated Global Terrorists must obtain a special license from the U.S. Treasury Department before they can represent their clients in court. The lawyers were granted the license on August 4, 2010.

On August 30, 2010, the groups filed a "targeted killing" lawsuit, naming President Obama, CIA Director Leon Panetta, and Secretary of Defense Robert Gates as defendants. They sought an injunction preventing the targeted killing of al-Awlaki, and also sought to require the government to disclose the standards under which U.S. citizens may be "targeted for death". Judge John D. Bates dismissed the lawsuit in an 83-page ruling, holding that the father did not have legal standing to bring the lawsuit, and that his claims were judicially unreviewable under the political question doctrine inasmuch as he was questioning a decision that the U.S. Constitution committed to the political branches.

On May 5, 2011, the United States tried but failed to kill al-Awlaki by firing a missile from an unmanned drone at a car in Yemen. A Yemeni security official said that two al-Qaeda operatives in the car died.

== Death ==
External videos
- White House Press Briefing, September 30, 2011, "Jay Carney briefed reporters and answered questions on a number of issues, including the killing of the leader of al-Qaida in the Arabian peninsula (AQAP) Anwar al-Awlaki by a U.S. drone attack in a remote town of Yemen."

On September 30, 2011, al-Awlaki was killed in a U.S. drone strike in Al Jawf Governorate, Yemen. According to U.S. sources, the strike was carried out by Joint Special Operations Command, under the direction of the CIA. A witness said the group he was in had stopped to eat breakfast while traveling to Ma'rib Governorate. The occupants of the vehicle spotted the drone and attempted to flee in the vehicle before Hellfire missiles were fired. Yemen's Defense Ministry announced that al-Awlaki had been killed. Also killed was Samir Khan, an American born in Saudi Arabia, thought to be behind al-Qaeda's English-language web magazine Inspire. U.S. President Barack Obama said:

The death of Awlaki is a major blow to Al-Qaeda's most active operational affiliate. He took the lead in planning and directing efforts to murder innocent Americans ... and he repeatedly called on individuals in the United States and around the globe to kill innocent men, women and children to advance a murderous agenda. [The strike] is further proof that Al-Qaeda and its affiliates will find no safe haven anywhere in the world.

Journalist and author Glenn Greenwald, who would later collaborate with US whistleblower Edward Snowden, argued on Salon.com that killing al-Awlaki violated his First Amendment right of free speech and that doing so outside of a criminal proceeding violated the Constitution's Due Process Clause, specifically citing the 1969 Supreme Court decision in Brandenburg v. Ohio that "the constitutional guarantees of free speech and free press do not permit a State to forbid or proscribe advocacy of the use of force." He mentioned doubt among Yemeni experts about al-Awlaki's role in al-Qaeda, and called U.S. government accusations against him unverified and lacking in evidence.

In a letter dated May 22, 2013, to the chairman of the U.S. Senate Judiciary committee, Patrick J. Leahy, U.S. attorney general Eric Holder wrote that

high-level U.S. government officials [...] concluded that al-Aulaqi posed a continuing and imminent threat of violent attack against the United States. Before carrying out the operation that killed al-Aulaqi, senior officials also determined, based on a careful evaluation of the circumstances at the time, that it was not feasible to capture al-Aulaqi. In addition, senior officials determined that the operation would be conducted consistent with applicable law of war principles, including the cardinal principles of (1) necessity – the requirement that the target have definite military value; (2) distinction – the idea that only military objectives may be intentionally targeted and that civilians are protected from being intentionally targeted; (3) proportionality – the notion that the anticipated collateral damage of an action cannot be excessive in relation to the anticipated concrete and direct military advantage; and (4) humanity – a principle that requires us to use weapons that will not inflict unnecessary suffering. The operation was also undertaken consistent with Yemeni sovereignty. [...] The decision to target Anwar al-Aulaqi was lawful, it was considered, and it was just.

The Department of Justice's memo justifying the rationale for the drone strike on al-Awlaki

On April 21, 2014, the United States Court of Appeals for the Second Circuit ruled that the Obama administration must release documents justifying its drone killings of foreigners and Americans, including Anwar al-Awlaki. In June 2014, the United States Department of Justice disclosed a 2010 memorandum written by the acting head of the department's Office of Legal Counsel, David J. Barron. The memo stated that Anwar al-Awlaki was a significant threat with an infeasible probability of capture. Barron therefore justified the killing as legal, as "the Constitution would not require the government to provide further process". The New York Times Editorial Board dismissed the memo's rationale for al-Awlaki's killing, saying it "provides little confidence that the lethal action was taken with real care", instead describing it as "a slapdash pastiche of legal theories—some based on obscure interpretations of British and Israeli law—that was clearly tailored to the desired result." A lawyer for the ACLU described the memo as "disturbing" and "ultimately an argument that the president can order targeted killings of Americans without ever having to account to anyone outside the executive branch."

== Legacy ==
Seth Jones, an American political scientist specializing in al-Qaeda, says that the continuing relevance of al-Awlaki is due to his fluency in the English language as well as his charisma, precising that "he had a disarming aura and unnerving confidence, with an easy smile and a soothing, eloquent voice. He stood a lanky six feet, one inch tall [185 cm], weighed 160 pounds [73 kg], and had a thick black beard, an oversized nose, and wire-rimmed glasses. He spoke in a clear, almost hypnotic voice."

Al-Awlaki's videos and writings remain highly popular on the internet, where they continue to be readily accessible. Those who viewed and still view his videos are estimated by journalist Scott Shane to number in the hundreds of thousands, while his father Dr. Nasser Awlaqi says that "five million preaching tapes of Anwar Awlaqi have been sold in the West." And thus, even following his death, al-Awlaki has continued to inspire his devotees to carry out terrorist attacks, including the 2013 Boston Marathon bombing, the 2015 San Bernardino attack, and the 2016 Orlando nightclub shooting. According to the Counter Extremism Project (CEP), 88 "extremists", 54 in the U.S. and 34 in Europe, have been influenced by al-Awlaki. Because his work has "inspired countless plots and attacks", CEP has declared that "social media, particularly YouTube, must take action to permanently remove all of al-Awlaki's videos."

== FOIA documents ==
During the FBI investigation of the 9/11 attacks, it was discovered that a few of the attackers had attended the mosques in San Diego and Falls Church with which al-Awlaki was associated. Interviews with members of the San Diego mosque showed that Nawaz al-Hazmi, one of the attackers, may have had a private conversation with him. On that basis he was placed under 24-hour surveillance. It was discovered that he regularly patronized prostitutes. It was through FBI interrogation of prostitutes and escort service operators that al-Awlaki was tipped off in 2002 about FBI surveillance. Shortly thereafter, he left the United States.

In January 2013, Fox News announced that FBI documents obtained by Judicial Watch through a Freedom of Information Act request showed possible connections between al-Awlaki and the September 11 attackers. According to Judicial Watch, the documents show that the FBI knew that al-Awlaki had bought tickets for three of the hijackers to fly into Florida and Las Vegas. Judicial Watch further stated that al-Awlaki "was a central focus of the FBI's investigation of 9/11. They show he wasn't cooperative. And they show that he was under surveillance."

When queried by Fox News, the FBI denied having evidence connecting al-Awlaki and the September 11 attacks: "The FBI cautions against drawing conclusions from redacted FOIA documents. The FBI and investigating bodies have not found evidence connecting Anwar al-Awlaki and the attack on September 11, 2001. The document referenced does not link Anwar al-Awlaki with any purchase of airline tickets for the hijackers."

== Family ==
=== Abdulrahman al-Awlaki ===
Anwar al-Awlaki and Egyptian-born Gihan Mohsen Baker had a son, Abdulrahman Anwar al-Awlaki, born August 26, 1995, in Denver, who was an American citizen. Abdulrahman al-Awlaki was killed on October 14, 2011, in Yemen at the age of 16 in an American drone strike. Nine other people were killed in the same CIA-initiated attack, including a 17-year-old cousin of Abdulrahman. According to his relatives, shortly before his father's death, Abdulrahman had left the family home in Sana'a and travelled to Shabwa in search of his father who was believed to be in hiding in that area (though he was actually hundreds of miles away at the time). Abdulrahman was sitting in an open-air cafe in Shabwa when killed. According to U.S. officials, the killing of Abdulrahman al-Awlaki was a mistake; the intended target was an Egyptian, Ibrahim al-Banna, who was not at the targeted location at the time of the attack. Human rights groups have raised questions as to why an American citizen was killed by the United States in a country with which the United States is not officially at war. The US was at war with al-Qaeda which controlled some territory in Yemen. Abdulrahman al-Awlaki was not known to have any independent connection to terrorism, other than his father, cousin, and the al-Qaeda militants he was with.

=== Nasser al-Awlaki ===
Nasser al-Awlaki is the father of Anwar and grandfather of Abdulrahman al-Awlaki. Al-Awlaki stated he believed his son had been wrongly accused and was not a member of Al Qaeda. After the deaths of his son and grandson, Nasser in an interview in Time magazine called the killings a crime and condemned U.S. President Obama directly, saying: "I urge the American people to bring the killers to justice. I urge them to expose the hypocrisy of the 2009 Nobel Prize laureate. To some, he may be that. To me and my family, he is nothing more than a child killer."

In 2013, Nasser al-Awlaki published an op-ed in The New York Times stating that two years after killing his grandson, the Obama administration still declines to provide an explanation. In 2012, Nasser al-Awlaki filed a lawsuit, Al-Aulaqi v. Panetta, challenging the constitutionality of the drone killings of his son and grandson. This lawsuit was dismissed in April 2014 by D.C. District Court Judge Rosemary M. Collyer.

=== Tariq al-Dahab ===
Tariq al-Dahab, who led al-Qaeda insurgents in Yemen, was a brother-in-law of al-Awlaki. On February 16, 2012, the organization stated that he had been killed by agents, although media reports contain speculation that he was killed by his brother in a bloody family feud.

=== Nawar al-Awlaki ===
On January 29, 2017, Anwar al-Awlaki's 8-year-old daughter, Nawar al-Awlaki, who was an American citizen, was killed in a DEVGRU operation authorized by President Donald Trump.

== Islamic education ==
Al-Awlaki's Islamic education was primarily informal, and consisted of intermittent months with various scholars reading and contemplating Islamic scholarly works. Despite having no religious qualifications and almost no religious education, Al-Awlaki made a name for himself as a public speaker who released popular audio recordings. Political Islam scholars, such as Olivier Roy, said they did not understand al‑Awlaki's popularity, because while he spoke fluent English and could therefore reach a large non-Arabic-speaking audience, he lacked formal Islamic training and study.

== Ideology ==
While imprisoned in Yemen after 2004, al-Awlaki was influenced by the works of Sayyid Qutb, described by The New York Times as an originator of the contemporary "anti-Western Jihadist movement". He read 150 to 200 pages a day of Qutb's works, and described himself as "so immersed with the author I would feel Sayyid was with me in my cell speaking to me directly".

Awlaki believed the Taliban in Afghanistan and the Islamic Courts Union in Somalia to be two successful examples of modern Islamic governance, "even though far from perfect".

Terrorism consultant Evan Kohlmann in 2009 referred to al-Awlaki as "one of the principal jihadi luminaries for would-be homegrown terrorists. His fluency with English, his unabashed advocacy of jihad and mujahideen organizations, and his Web-savvy approach are a powerful combination." He called al-Awlaki's lecture, "Constants on the Path of Jihad", which he says was based on a similar document written by al-Qaeda's founder, the "virtual bible for lone-wolf Muslim extremists". Philip Mudd, formerly of the CIA's National Counterterrorism Center and the FBI's top intelligence adviser, called him "a magnetic character ... a powerful orator." He attracted young men to his lectures, especially US-based and UK-based Muslims.

U.S. officials and some U.S. media sources called al-Awlaki an Islamic fundamentalist and accused him of encouraging terrorism. According to documents recovered from bin Laden's hideout, the al-Qaeda leader was unsure about al-Awlaki's qualifications.

== Works ==
The Nine Eleven Finding Answers Foundation said al-Awlaki's ability to write and speak in fluent English enabled him to incite English-speaking Muslims to terrorism. Al-Awlaki notes in 44 Ways to Support Jihad that most reading material on the subject is in Arabic.

=== Written works ===
- 44 Ways to Support Jihad: Essay (January 2009). In it, al-Awlaki states that "The hatred of kuffar is a central element of our military creed" and that all Muslims are obligated to participate in jihad, either by committing the acts themselves or supporting others who do so. He says all Muslims must remain physically fit so as to be prepared for conflict. According to U.S. officials, it is considered a key text for al-Qaeda members.
- Al-Awlaki wrote for Jihad Recollections, an English language online publication published by Al-Fursan Media.
- Allah is Preparing Us for Victory – short book (2009).

=== Lectures ===
- Lectures on the book Constants on the Path of Jihad by al-Ayiri—concerns leaderless jihad.
- In 2009, the UK government found 1,910 of his videos had been posted to YouTube. One of them had been viewed 164,420 times.
- The Battle of Hearts and Minds
- The Dust Will Never Settle Down
- Dreams & Interpretations
- The Hereafter—16 CDs—Al Basheer Productions
- Life of Muhammad: Makkan Period—16 CDs—Al Basheer Productions
- Life of Muhammad: Medinan Period—Lecture in 2 Parts—18 CDs—Al Basheer Productions
- Lives of the Prophets (AS)—16 CDs—Al Basheer Productions
- Abu Bakr as-Siddiq (RA): His Life & Times—15 CDs—Al Basheer Productions
- Umar ibn al-Khattāb (RA): His Life & Times—18 CDs—Al Basheer Productions
- 25 Promises from Allah to the Believer—2 CDs—Noor Productions
- Companions of the Ditch & Lessons from the Life of Musa (AS)—2 CDs—Noor Productions
- Remembrance of Allah & the Greatest Ayah—2 CDs—Noor Productions
- Stories from Hadith—4 CDs—Center for Islamic Information and Education ("CIIE")
- Hellfire & The Day of Judgment—CD—CIIE
- Quest for Truth: The Story of Salman Al-Farsi (RA)—CD—CIIE
- Trials & Lessons for Muslim Minorities—CD—CIIE
- Young Ayesha (RA) & Mothers of the Believers (RA)—CD—CIIE
- Understanding the Quran—CD—CIIE
- Lessons from the Companions (RA) Living as a Minority—CD—CIIE
- Virtues of the Sahabah—video lecture series promoted by the al-Wasatiyyah Foundation

=== Website ===
Al-Awlaki maintained a website and blog on which he shared his views. On December 11, 2008, he said Muslims should not seek to "serve in the armies of the disbelievers and fight against his brothers".

In "44 Ways to Support Jihad", posted on his blog in February 2009, al-Awlaki encouraged others to "fight jihad", and explained how to give money to the mujahideen or their families. Al-Awlaki's sermon encourages others to conduct weapons training, and raise children "on the love of Jihad". Also that month, he wrote: "I pray that Allah destroys America and all its allies." He wrote as well: "We will implement the rule of Allah on Earth by the tip of the sword, whether the masses like it or not." On July 14, he said that Muslim countries should not offer military assistance to the US. "The blame should be placed on the soldier who is willing to follow orders ... who sells his religion for a few dollars," he said. In blog post dated July 15, 2009, entitled "Fighting Against Government Armies in the Muslim World", al-Awlaki wrote, "Blessed are those who fight against [American soldiers], and blessed are those shuhada [martyrs] who are killed by them."

In a video posted to the internet on November 8, 2010, al-Awlaki called for Muslims to kill Americans "without hesitation", and overthrow Arab governments that cooperate with the US. "Don't consult with anyone in fighting the Americans, fighting the devil doesn't require consultation or prayers or seeking divine guidance. They are the party of the devils", al-Awlaki said. That month, Intelligence Research Specialist Kevin Yorke of the New York Police Department's Counterterrorism Division called him "the most dangerous man in the world".

== See also ==
- Church Committee
- Executive Order 12333
- Extrajudicial killing
- International counter-terrorism activities of the CIA
- Protocol I
