= Nasser al-Awlaki =

Yemeni scholar and politician (1946–2021)

- Born: 1946; Said, Shabwa Governorate, Yemen
- Died: 28 September 2021 (aged 74–75)
- Occupation(s): Politician, scholar
- Known for: Former agriculture minister of Yemen, former president of Sanaa University
- Children: Anwar al-Awlaki
- Relatives: Abdulrahman al-Awlaki (grandson), Nawar al-Awlaki (granddaughter)

Nasser al-Awlaki (Arabic: ناصر العولقي; 1946 – 28 September 2021) was a Yemeni scholar and politician, serving as Agriculture Minister of Yemen in Ali Abdullah Saleh's government. He was also president of Sanaa University.

== Biography ==
He was a Fulbright Scholar and earned a master's degree in agricultural economics at New Mexico State University in 1971. He received a doctorate at the University of Nebraska–Lincoln, and worked at the University of Minnesota from 1975 to 1977. Nasser al-Awlaki served as Agriculture Minister of Yemen in Ali Abdullah Saleh's government. He was also President of Sana'a University. Yemen's prime minister from 2007 to 2011, Ali Mohammed Mujur, was a relative.

He was the father of Anwar and grandfather of Abdulrahman al-Awlaki, who were killed in separate U.S. drone strikes. After the deaths of his son and grandson, Nasser published a six-minute audio message condemning the U.S. for the killings. In the audio, he said of President Barack Obama:

I urge the American people to bring the killers to justice. I urge them to expose the hypocrisy of the 2009 Nobel Prize laureate. To some, he may be that. To me and my family, he is nothing more than a child killer.

— q.v. TIME, CNN

Al-Awlaki claimed his son Anwar was far from any battlefield. In 2010, al-Awlaki also said he believed Anwar had been wrongly accused and had not been a member of al-Qaeda.

On 29 January 2017, Nawar al-Awlaki, Nasser's 8-year-old granddaughter, was the third member of his family to be killed by the U.S. The girl was among several civilians killed in the Yakla raid, the first covert operation ordered by President Donald Trump. Nasser said in response "This is the new (U.S.) administration – it's very sad, a big crime."

Nasser al-Awlaki's son Anwar was a U.S. citizen, born in New Mexico in 1971 while Nasser was earning his master's degree.

Al-Awlaki died on 28 September 2021 after suffering from illness.
