= William Owens (Navy SEAL) =

United States Navy SEAL senior chief petty officer (1980–2017)

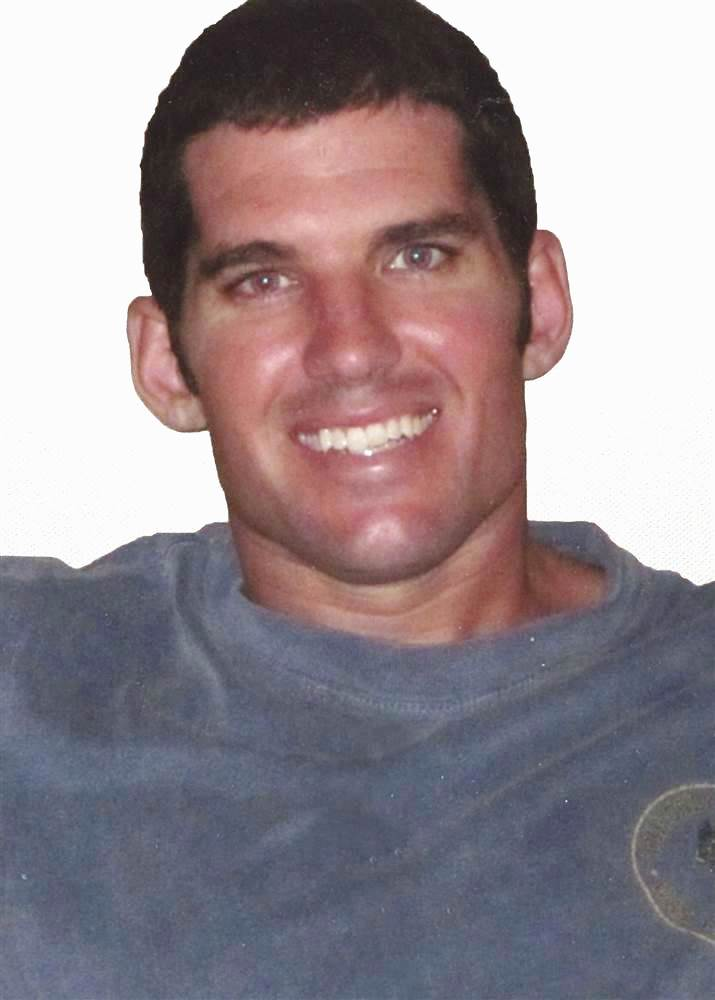
- Born: March 5, 1980; Peoria, Illinois, U.S.
- Died: January 29, 2017 (aged 36); Al Bayda Governorate, Yemen
- Spouse: Carryn Owens
- Children: 3
- Military career
- Allegiance: United States
- Branch: U.S. Navy
- Service years: 1998–2017
- Rank: Senior chief petty officer (posthumously)
- Unit: DEVGRU
- Conflicts: War on terror: War in Afghanistan; Iraq War; War in Somalia; Al-Qaeda insurgency in Yemen; Yakla raid †

William Ryan Owens (March 5, 1980 – January 29, 2017) was a decorated United States Navy SEAL senior chief petty officer. He died in the Yakla raid in Yemen, making him the first American to die in combat under the first Trump administration.

== Early life ==
Owens was born on March 5, 1980, in Peoria, Illinois. He grew up in Fort Lauderdale, Florida and Chillicothe, Illinois. Owens' parents worked at the Fort Lauderdale Police Department, where his father was a policeman and a military veteran while his mother was a detective. One of Owens' brothers retired from the Navy SEALs and the other brother works for the Hollywood Police Department. Owens attended Illinois Valley Central High School and graduated in 1998.

== Career ==
Owens joined the United States Navy on August 24, 1998. He served in the Office of Naval Intelligence in Suitland, Maryland from 1999 until 2001. Owens then reported to Naval Amphibious Base Coronado for Basic Underwater Demolition/SEAL Training (BUD/S). He graduated BUD/S Class 239 in 2002 and subsequently completed SEAL Qualification Training (SQT). Owens was then assigned to SEAL Team ONE in Coronado, California from January 2003 to January 2007. In 2007, he volunteered for Naval Special Warfare Development Group and completed a specialized selection and training course. He was on five tours of duty during the course of his career as a Navy SEAL. He became a chief petty officer in 2009, and was promoted to senior chief petty officer a week after his death. CNN reported that during these tours, he helped rescue comrades who were pinned down and wounded, and guided in MEDEVAC choppers while under fire.

CNN reported that Owens was awarded the Silver Star (posthumously) for actions during a three-day battle in Somalia in July 2015, in which Owens led a 12-man team alongside local forces against 400 al Qaeda militants. His citation states that he was ambushed with "small arms, machine guns, anti-aircraft guns, rocket propelled grenades, mortars, and improvised explosive devices" and that he "repeatedly exposed himself to enemy fire", helping eventually capture the town that had been under militant control for 10 years.

Owens was the recipient of two Bronze Star Medals, the Global War on Terrorism Service Medal, the Global War on Terrorism Expeditionary Medal, the Afghanistan Campaign Medal, the Iraq Campaign Medal, the National Defense Service Medal, the Good Conduct Medal, the Joint Meritorious Unit Award, the Achievement Medal, the Commendation Medal, the Sea Service Ribbon, and three Presidential Unit Citations.

=== Silver Star citation ===
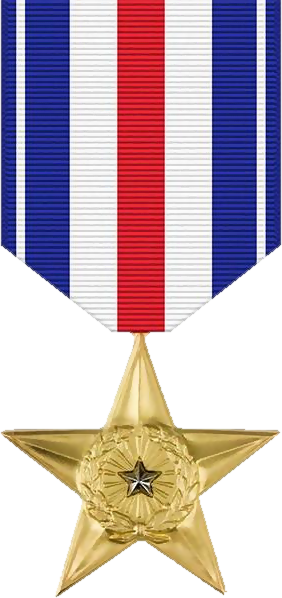

The President of the United States of America takes pride in presenting the Silver Star (Posthumously) to Senior Chief Special Warfare Operator (SEAL) William Ryan Owens, United States Navy, for conspicuous gallantry and intrepidity in action against the enemy from 19 July 2015 to 21 July 2015, while serving with a Joint Task Force in support of overseas contingency operations. Senior Chief Owens was the Ground Force Commander for a 12-member joint element and the senior enlisted advisor to a 240-member partner force. His bold combat leadership and personal courage under fire emboldened and inspired his mounted element to penetrate 275 kilometers into enemy-held territory against a determined force of 400 enemy fighters. Throughout several days, his convoy encountered constant ambushes and attacks from small arms, machine guns, anti-aircraft guns, rocket propelled grenades, mortars, and improvised explosive devices. Senior Chief Owens repeatedly exposed himself to enemy fire to personally engage and neutralize enemy fighters, issue orders to his team, and direct the tactical actions of the partner force. His extraordinary and valorous actions were the key to achieving the decisive victory, which included destruction of three enemy technical vehicles and associated heavy weapons, establishment of two combat outposts in the region, and securing a town that had previously been in enemy hands for 10 years. By his bold initiative, undaunted courage, and complete dedication to duty, Senior Chief Petty Officer Owens reflected great credit upon himself and upheld the highest traditions of the United States Naval Service.

== Death ==
Owens died of wounds as a result of the Yakla raid, a U.S.-led Special Operations Forces attack in Al Bayda province in central Yemen, a terrorism-related mission during the Yemeni Civil War, on January 29, 2017. The need for the raid, which was planned by the Obama administration and took place six days after Trump was sworn into office, was questioned by Ryan's father, Bill Owens. Owens is buried at Arlington National Cemetery.

== Tributes and controversy ==
On hearing of his death, Rear Admiral Timothy Szymanski, Commander of Naval Special Warfare Command, called Owens "an exceptional SEAL—an experienced warrior and a highly respected teammate who served silently, nobly and bravely through several combat deployments." He went on to express that "Ryan's legacy strengthens our own resolve and commitment to this crucial fight. We hope his family can find comfort in the love and support of Family, Friends and Teammates." Donald Trump and his daughter Ivanka Trump paid their respects on the arrival of Owens' remains at Dover Air Force Base on February 1, 2017. Trump said, "My deepest thoughts and humblest prayers are with the family of this fallen service member."

On February 27, 2017, in an interview with Fox News, Trump said: "This was a mission that was started before I got here. This was something that was, you know, just they wanted to do. They came to see me. They explained what they wanted to do, the generals, who are very respected. My generals are the most respected that we've had in many decades I believe. And they lost Ryan." President Trump paid tribute to Owens during his address to a joint session of Congress on February 28, 2017, saying, "Ryan's legacy is etched into eternity."

Owens' father, William Owens, a military veteran, refused to meet with Trump and asked for an investigation into his son's death. He stated: "I didn't want to make a scene about it, but my conscience wouldn't let me talk to him [Trump]." He also criticized Trump for refusing to order an investigation, saying: "Don't hide behind my son's death to prevent an investigation."

Owens was friends with San Francisco Giants pitcher Javier Lopez and other Giants players during a spring training visit. Owens' family collectively threw out the first pitch before the Giants' 2017 home opener. Lopez described Owens as "[his] counselor".

== Personal life ==
Owens and his wife, Carryn, had three children together.
