= Raid on Yakla =

2017 US-led operation in Yemen against al-Qaeda

Coordinates: 14.598°N 45.060°E

- Part of the Yemeni Civil War (2014–present) and the war on terror
- Raid location (Yemen)
| Date | 29 January 2017 |
| Location | Al-Ghayil, Wald Rabi' District, Al Bayda Governorate, Yemen |
| Result | Mission failure: Target not found; White House and Defense Secretary claim the raid was a success and generated large amounts of vital intelligence; Pentagon claims one terabyte of information on AQAP was captured; Senior U.S. officials later claim raid produced no significant intelligence |

Belligerents
| United States; United Arab Emirates | al-Qaeda in the Arabian Peninsula: al-Dhahab Tribesmen |

Commanders and leaders
| (United States) Donald Trump (United States) James Mattis (United States) Raymond A. Thomas (United Arab Emirates) Mohammed bin Zayed Al Nahyan | Abdul Rauf al-Dhahab †; Sultan al-Dhahab †; Seif al-Joufi †; Abu Barazan |

Strength
| United States: 40 DEVGRU operators (Gold Squadron); 2 V-22 Osprey tiltrotors; 2 Harrier jets; United Arab Emirates: Unknown number of commandos | Unknown |

Casualties and losses
| 1 killed 3 wounded 1 V-22 Osprey destroyed | 14 killed (U.S. estimate) |
- 10–30 civilian casualties (including at least 10 women and children, and 1 U.S. citizen)

The Raid on Yakla was a joint United States/United Arab Emirates military operation carried out on January 29, 2017 in al-Ghayil, a village in the Yakla area of the Al Bayda Governorate of central Yemen, during the Yemeni civil war. Prepared by U.S. counterterrorism officials under President Barack Obama, the mission was ultimately authorized by President Donald Trump nine days into his presidency. The mission's goal was to gather intelligence on al-Qaeda in the Arabian Peninsula, and to target the group's leader, Qasim al-Raymi. The raid was led by U.S. Central Command (CENTCOM) with resources from U.S. Special Operations Command (SOCOM), and the Central Intelligence Agency, as well as commandos from the United Arab Emirates Army.

Between 10 and 30 civilians (including Nawar al-Awlaki, the eight-year-old American daughter of the deceased al-Qaeda preacher Anwar al-Awlaki) were killed in the raid along with up to 14 al-Qaeda fighters, as well as American Navy SEAL William Owens. A Bell Boeing MV-22B Osprey was destroyed during the operation.

The raid in Yemen was described as "risky from the start and costly in the end"; the "botched" operation raised questions about the choice to go forward with the raid "without sufficient intelligence, ground support or adequate backup preparations".

== Background ==
The United States has supported an ongoing Saudi Arabian-led intervention in Yemen in their campaign against Houthi militants with weapons, intelligence, advice on operations, maritime operations, and refueling of aircraft. The United States also has an ongoing campaign against Al-Qaeda in the Arabian Peninsula (AQAP). The last US-led ground operation against AQAP in Yemen was in 2014. In 2016, the US and Emirati armed forces sent Special Operations forces to Yemen to monitor AQAP. The US conducted eight drone strikes against suspected AQAP operatives in Al Bayda during 2016, and a further strike on January 21, 2017.

The International Crisis Group reported in February 2017 that al-Qaeda in the Arabian Peninsula "is stronger than it has ever been" and is "thriving in an environment of state collapse, growing sectarianism, shifting alliances, security vacuums and a burgeoning war economy" brought on by Yemen's Civil War. In 2011, AQAP created Ansar Al-Sharia (AAS), a Yemen-based affiliate focused on waging an insurgency rather than international attacks on the West. In the view of the International Crisis Group, AQAP is "an internally diverse organisation with varying layers of support among the local population" and many AAS members and allies are not committed to AQAP's international agenda. As of early 2017, AQAP and AAS were currently in a struggle for territorial control with the Houthi/Saleh forces in the governorates of al-Bayda, Shebwa, Marib, Jawf and Taiz.

The principal targets of the raid were members of the al-Dhahab family and their houses, led by Abdelrauf al-Dhahab. Their clan is influential and Abdelrauf reportedly could call on a tribal force of 800 men. A number of the eighteen sons of patriarch Sheikh Ahmed Nasser al-Dhahab have joined AQAP or its armed affiliate organizations, including Tariq, Qaid, and Nabil. Qaid was killed by an August 2013 drone strike. Nabil was killed by a November 2014 drone strike. Tariq died while leading an AAS takeover of Rada'a, which also claimed the life of his half-brother Hizam, fighting on the other side.

Whether or not Abdelrauf was affiliated with Al Qaeda is disputed. As of 2014, Slate reported, Abdelrauf "skirt[ed] the line between an AQAP sympathizer and outright supporter." Abdelrauf al-Dhahab "repeatedly denied belonging to al-Qaida," and publicly pledged to drive them out of Al Bayda province in 2013. Prior to the raid, Abdelrauf al-Dhahab held a five-day meeting with military officials in the US-backed government of Abdrabbuh Mansur Hadi. The military reportedly gave him some 15 million riyals (US$60,000) to fight against the Houthi rebels. Hadi government military spokesman Maj. Gen. Mohsen Khasrouf has stated that al-Dhahab was working with the government to retake the city of Rada'a from the Houthis.

The US military reported that the raid had been planned "for months" and is "one in a series of aggressive actions against al-Qaida in the Arabian Peninsula in Yemen." The Obama administration refused to approve the raid; the Guardian reported that it had been reviewed several times, citing an anonymous government source. Colin Kahl, who served as Deputy Assistant to the President and National Security Advisor to the Vice President until January 2017, has publicly stated that "This particular raid was NOT discussed," but that it fell under an expanded plan to authorize military actions prepared by the Department of Defense. Further, Kahl stated, "Obama made no decisions on this before leaving office, believing it represented escalation of U.S. involvement in Yemen." In a report for the Washington Post, multiple defense sources stated they expected the Trump Administration to more readily approve similar operations.

=== Approval of the raid ===
The approval of the Yakla raid did not follow the rigorous procedure used during the administrations of George W. Bush and Barack Obama, which involved a Situation Room meeting that detailed the operational plan, operational goals, a risk assessment (to both U.S. personnel and civilians), and a legal assessment of the operation. Instead, the raid was approved over dinner conversations between Trump, his son-in-law and adviser Jared Kushner, his special adviser Steve Bannon, and Defense Secretary Jim Mattis. Mattis, along with General Joseph Dunford, the chairman of the Joint Chiefs of Staff, presented the plan; then-National Security Advisor Michael Flynn was also at the dinner. No representatives from the State Department were present, departing from the norms of previous administrations. Steve Bannon and Jared Kushner both reportedly opposed the mission. Flynn reportedly strongly advocated for the mission to President Trump.

The decision did not go through the normal National Security Council (NSC) channels, through which heads or deputy heads of all agencies with a stake in the operation would be consulted. U.S. military officials stated that the assault went forth "without sufficient intelligence, ground support, or adequate backup preparations."

== The raid ==
On January 26, a team of DEVGRU operators were staged from Djibouti to the USS Makin Island amphibious readiness group. At dawn on January 29, several dozen commandos from the Naval Special Warfare Development Group (DEVGRU), as well as operators from the United Arab Emirates, were landed by a pair of MV-22 Osprey tiltrotor aircraft near the home of al-Qaeda leader Abdul Rauf al-Dhahab in the mountainous Yakla region of Al-Bayda. While approaching, the operators were informed via a communications intercept that al-Qaeda forces had become aware of their position. The DEVGRU team "found itself dropping onto a reinforced al Qaeda base defended by landmines, snipers, and a larger than expected contingent of heavily armed Islamist extremists."

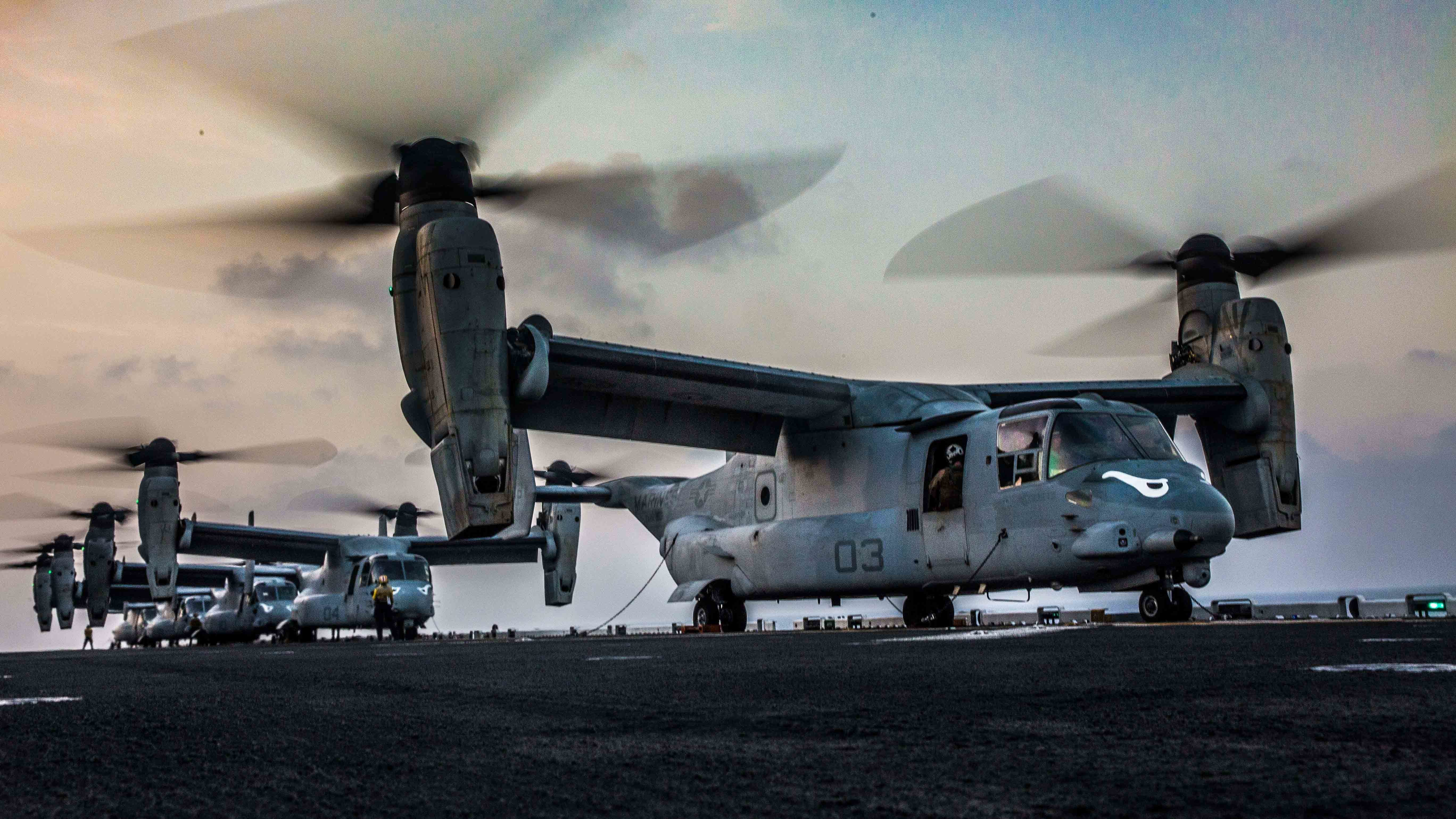
U.S. Marine MV-22 Ospreys on the amphibious assault ship USS Makin Island, December 21, 2016

Surviving villager Sheikh Abdelilah Ahmed al-Dhahab reported that his eleven-year-old son, Ahmed Abdelilah Ahmed al Dahab, was the first to address the soldiers, asking "Who are you?" He was fatally shot.

At the village, the US-UAE team engaged in a heavy firefight with the al-Qaeda forces. US helicopter gunships and fighter aircraft also fired on the town. One of the U.S. operators, Chief Petty Officer William Owens, was struck by gunfire above his armor plating and fatally wounded. During the extraction of the DEVGRU operators, a United States Marine Corps (USMC) MV-22B Osprey was damaged in a hard landing (crash landed) after losing power, injuring three additional American operators aboard. The Osprey was subsequently destroyed by a friendly airstrike carried out by a Harrier jet to avoid any of the crashed aircraft's sensitive electronics from being captured by the enemy. The DEVGRU operatives successfully extracted and departed the area after completing their raid.

The operation severely damaged a local clinic, the mosque, and the school in the Yemeni village.

== Objective ==
After the raid, unidentified U.S. military and intelligence officials told NBC News that its objective had been to capture or kill Qasim al-Raymi, a U.S.-designated terrorist and the leader of al-Qaeda in the Arabian Peninsula (AQAP), which the military did not originally acknowledge. According to military officials, the prospect of killing or capturing al-Raymi convinced the U.S. chain of command that the mission was worth the risk.

Shortly after the raid, on 5 February al-Raymi released an audio message online taunting U.S. President Donald Trump as the "fool of the White House" who "got slapped" early on in his role as Commander in Chief. The audio clip was found to be authentic by sources in the military. The Associated Press reported that the audio has not been independently verified, but it was "similar to that of previous recordings by al-Raymi". It was not clear whether al-Raymi was tipped off to the raid, whether he simply wasn't there, or whether he escaped when the special operations forces arrived.

A month after the raid, the U.S. military denied that al-Raymi was the target of the operation. Instead, White House Press Secretary Sean Spicer and the Pentagon described it as a "site exploitation mission" to gather intelligence.

== Casualties ==
=== Al-Qaeda ===
The raid killed three "prominent members of Al-Qaeda": Abdulraoof al-Dhahab, Sultan al-Dhahab, and Seif al-Nims. The US military reported that fourteen al-Qaeda in the Arabian Peninsula (AQAP) fighters were killed. Arwa Baghdadi, a 35-year-old Saudi woman who had traveled to Yemen to join Al Qaeda, was killed in the raid; before leaving Saudi Arabia, she had been on trial facing terrorism charges. Later, on February 3, CENTCOM released clips from videos retrieved in the raid and claimed that two of the Al Qaeda leaders who were killed, Sultan al-Dhahab and Abdulraoof al-Dhahab, were longstanding AQAP operational planners and weapons experts. CENTCOM also claimed after releasing the clips that several of the 14 militants who were killed were also terrorist network leaders and facilitators.

Following the raid there were articles disputing the affiliation of the raid's targets, and consequences of the raid, with Farea Al-Muslimi, visiting fellow at the Carnegie Middle East Center and co-founder of the youth-oriented Sanaa Center for Strategic Studies, stating that Abdulraoof al-Dhahab's death will stir anti-US sentiment—not because he belonged to AQAP, but because he didn't.

=== Civilian deaths ===
The U.S. military initially denied there were any civilian casualties, but later declared it was investigating if they occurred. The Pentagon later confirmed that civilians, including women and children, were likely killed in the attack. A Yemeni government official in Al Bayda Governorate said on January 31 that at least eight women and seven children (ranging in age from 3 to 13) were killed. Human Rights Watch reported on February 24 that at least 14 civilians, including nine children, were killed in the operation. The Bureau of Investigative Journalism (BIJ), a London-based NGO, found that the operation went "dreadfully wrong" and that, according to local villagers, 25 civilians, who were not members of AQAP, were killed; this included nine children under the age of 13, with the youngest being a three-month-old baby. The BIJ listed the names and ages of the dead children. Beside the nine children killed, the BIJ reports that one pregnant woman was also killed. The civilian deaths appear to have been a result of the aerial gunfire from U.S. support aircraft, according to a CENTCOM statement.

Nawar al-Awlaki

Among those killed in the Raid on Yakla was an 8-year-old American citizen Nawar al-Awlaki, also known as Nora. Nora's grandfather, Nasser al-Awlaki, said she was hit by a bullet to the neck and suffered for two hours before dying. Nawar was the daughter of the American-Yemeni propagandist, and operative for al-Qaeda in the Arabian Peninsula (AQAP) Anwar al-Awlaki, who was killed by a US drone strike in September 2011, after the US government made terrorism allegations against him. Nora's older brother, Abdulrahman al-Awlaki who also held American citizenship, was killed when he was 16 by a US drone strike in October 2011 while eating dinner.

Her death gained national coverage and attention in both mainstream and online media sources. Nawar's grandfather, Nasser al-Awlaki, said of her killing, "She was hit with a bullet in her neck and suffered for two hours. Why kill children? This is the new U.S. administration – it's very sad, a big crime." Nawar died with her mother and uncle by her side. Two weeks after the death of her father, Nawar's sixteen-year-old half-brother, Abdulrahman, was also killed in a U.S. drone strike.

=== Destruction of buildings and killing of livestock ===
When U.S. warplanes struck the village, they hit more than a dozen buildings and killed more than 120 goats, sheep, and donkeys.

=== U.S. military ===
During the raid, one American commando from DEVGRU (commonly known as SEAL Team Six), Chief Petty Officer William Owens, was killed. Three additional DEVGRU operators were wounded.

== Responses ==
=== Al-Qaeda ===
AQAP later issued a statement acknowledging the raid, mourned for their killed fighters, and referred to the raid as a massacre.

=== Evaluations ===
White House Press Secretary Sean Spicer said during a briefing that the raid was "highly successful" and retired U.S. Army Lieutenant General Mark Hertling, "The mission was a success by all accounts." A national security adviser in the administration of former President George W. Bush, Juan Zarate, said that even though the raid had not killed al-Rimi, it could still yield smaller victories: "Certainly, if the goal is to capture the leader of al Qaeda in the Arabian Peninsula, that didn't happen. It wasn't successful in that regard. On the other hand, a number of al Qaeda leaders were killed and al Qaeda was disrupted, at least in terms of that cell. They understand that the US is willing to lean forward, and perhaps they're being deterred or disrupted in their activities." New York Times journalist David Sanger, who covered the raid, said on February 2, "It’s hard to call this much of a success yet, because we don’t know what the value was of the information they were trying to exploit, which came mostly from computers and cell phones. And from everything we have heard, they haven’t had a chance to assess that yet."

Spicer asserted that the raid "gathered an unbelievable amount of intelligence that will prevent the potential deaths or attacks on American soil." However, the only example that Pentagon officials were able to point to was an outdated instructional video on bomb making that was of no current value. Multiple senior officials told NBC News that the raid had yielded no significant intelligence and that they had seen no evidence that the intelligence would save lives or prevent future attacks.

The International Crisis Group's senior analyst on the Arabian Peninsula, April Longley Alley, described the raid as "a good example of what not to do" and wrote that the raid "ignore[d] the local political context, to the detriment of an effective counter-terrorism strategy." Richard Atwood, also of the International Crisis Group, said that an operation like the Yakla raid is more likely to radicalize Yemeni tribesmen, strengthen the hand of al-Qaida, and "feed anti-Americanism", particularly when civilians are killed.

Karen J. Greenberg, the director of Fordham University's Center on National Security, said that Nawar al-Awlaki's death will be used by al Qaeda propagandists: "The perception will be that it's not enough to kill al-Awlaki—that the U.S. had to kill the entire family."

On Fox & Friends, February 28, 2017, President Trump blamed the failure of the mission on the military.

On February 28, during Trump's address to a joint session of Congress, he claimed that Defense Secretary Jim Mattis stated the raid was "a highly successful raid that generated large amounts of vital intelligence that will lead to many more victories in the future against our enemies."

In early March 2017, several US officials revealed that US Special Operation Forces captured about 1 Terabyte's worth of information on AQAP in the raid, and that the US was actively trying to locate and monitor hundreds of al-Qaeda contacts obtained from the raid.

=== Subsequent investigations and calls for inquiry on planning ===
As of February 27, 2017, The Yakla raid was the subject of three pending Defense Department investigations. The first, a "15-6 investigation", is a routine review conducted by U.S. Central Command. The second is a "civilian casualty credibility assessment", which may lead to a more formal investigation. This investigation will review reports that as many as 30 civilians were killed, including women and young children. The third inquiry is an "aviation mishap investigation" to review how the MV-22 Osprey, a $70 million U.S. warplane, became so badly damaged in the raid that it had to be destroyed.

William Owens, the father of Chief Petty Officer William Owens, who was killed in the raid, refused to meet with President Donald Trump at Dover Air Force Base after his son's death. Owens also criticized the administration's handling of the raid, and demanded an investigation into its planning and approval. William Owens told the Miami Herald, "I told them I didn’t want to make a scene about it, but my conscience wouldn't let me talk to him. Why at this time did there have to be this stupid mission when it wasn’t even barely a week into his administration? Why? For two years prior, there were no boots on the ground in Yemen—everything was missiles and drones—because there was not a target worth one American life. Now all of a sudden we had to make this grand display?" Owens stated: "Don't hide behind my son's death to prevent an investigation. The government owes my son an investigation."

Congressional Democrats have called for a briefing from the Pentagon on the raid. In a letter to House Armed Services Committee Chairman Mac Thornberry, Republican of Texas, U.S. Representative Ruben Gallego (Democrat of Arizona) wrote: "The chaotic events that unfolded in Yemen should prompt an urgent inquiring from our committee." In a separate statement, Representative Ted Lieu of California said that he was "'highly disturbed' by the reports that the mission was approved without full intelligence" and that "Given this context, the lingering questions surrounding the Yemen mission are deeply troubling and they demand answers. I have requested a briefing on this counterterrorism operation from the Department of Defense."

The human rights group Amnesty International, in a letter to Defense Secretary Mattis, called for "a prompt, thorough and impartial investigation" into the raid, "signaling that you take seriously the issues of civilian casualties and respect for international humanitarian law." Human Rights Watch also called upon the U.S. to "credibly investigate" civilian deaths, writing: "The high number of civilian casualties raises concerns that US forces and the armed group failed to take all necessary measures to minimize loss of civilian life, as required by the laws of war."

=== Yemen ===
Abdulmalik Al-Mekhlafi, the Foreign Minister of Yemen, reacted by writing "The extrajudicial killings and killing civilians are condemned acts that support terrorism" on his official Twitter account. The New York Times, citing U.S. officials, reported, "Yemen has withdrawn permission for the United States to run Special Operations ground missions against suspected terrorist groups in the country." The AP, however, citing an official statement from foreign minister Al-Mekhlafi, didn't go as far. Mekhlafi called for a "reassessment" of the raid, but he said it was "not true" that there was a demand for a halt in US operations. "Yemen continues to cooperate with the United States and continues to abide by all the agreements", Mekhlafi said.

== Aftermath ==
According to a senior U.S. military official, Navy SEALs attempted to conduct another raid inside Yemen in early March 2017, but aborted the mission at the last minute.

== See also ==
- Raid on Al Hathla
