= Samir Khan =

Saudi Arabian–American citizen and suspected Islamic terrorist (1985–2011)

- سمير بن ظافر خان
- Born: Samir ibn Zafar Khan; December 25, 1985; Riyadh, Saudi Arabia
- Died: September 30, 2011 (aged 25); Al Jawf Governorate, Yemen
- Cause of death: Drone strike
- Occupations: Editor and publisher of Inspire magazine

Samir ibn Zafar Khan (Arabic: سمير بن ظافر خان, Urdu: سمیر خان; December 25, 1985 – September 30, 2011) was a Saudi Arabian naturalized U.S. citizen, jihadist militant, and the editor and publisher of Inspire, an English-language online magazine reported to be published by the Islamic terrorist group al-Qaeda in the Arabian Peninsula (AQAP). He was killed in a drone strike in Yemen together with Anwar al-Awlaki.

== Early life ==
Khan was born in Riyadh, Saudi Arabia, to parents of Pakistani descent and grew up in Queens, New York City, U.S. He also spent some of his teenage years living in Westbury, New York. He graduated from W. Tresper Clarke High School in 2003 where he wrote for the school newspaper and played junior varsity football. According to his classmates, he refused to recite the Pledge of Allegiance and blamed Americans for the September 11 attacks. Khan's father, Zafar Khan, is an information technology executive. The family moved to Charlotte, North Carolina, in 2004.

He lived in Charlotte before leaving the country for Yemen in 2009. He reportedly cut off ties with his family when he left the U.S. After Khan's death, a family friend told CNN that Khan's father did not agree with his son's ideas and had sought help to change his son's radical views on several occasions.

== Activities ==
In 2003, Khan started a Blogspot blog called "InshallahShaheed" or "Martyr, God willing" from his parents' basement. Before moving to Yemen he launched the magazine Jihad Recollections, "the first online jihadist magazine in English", with four issues, with the last one published in September 2009. After moving to Yemen he became the editor of Inspire. In an article written by Khan and published in Inspire titled, "I am proud to be a traitor to America," Khan outlined his grievances against the United States. According to Ben Venzke, CEO of IntelCenter, "The primary focus of the magazine is to inspire individuals to not just fly to Yemen and join the group, but rather to provide them with the inspiration, the ideological framework, the targeting philosophy and the practical mechanics of building a bomb or conducting a shooting."

In his book Ticking Time Bomb: Counter-Terrorism Lessons from the U.S. Government's Failure to Prevent the Fort Hood Attack (2011), former U.S. senator Joe Lieberman described Australian Muslim preacher Feiz Mohammad, American-Yemeni imam Anwar al-Awlaki, Muslim cleric Abdullah el-Faisal, and Pakistani-American Samir Khan as "virtual spiritual sanctioners" who use the internet to offer religious justification for Islamist terrorism. Authors Haroro J. Ingram and Jon Lewis describe Khan as an influential leader who employed his personal beliefs and values to influence his followers through his writing.

It was reported in May 2013 that Al Qaeda devotees native to the United States might have been using the instruction manuals that Khan posted online before his death. According to the indictment against Dzhokhar Tsarnev, one of the perpetrators of the Boston Marathon Bombing, the bomb used in the attack was from a bomb instruction published in Inspire.

== Death ==
Khan was killed in the Al Jawf Governorate of Yemen while traveling from the Ma'rib Governorate, in the same air-strike that killed Anwar al-Awlaki. Both were U.S. citizens. According to U.S. officials Khan was not a significant enough target to have been specifically targeted but died because he was accompanying al-Awlaki.

=== Reactions ===
Attorney and journalist Glenn Greenwald said that the killing was a violation of the due process clause of the Fifth Amendment to the United States Constitution, which states that no person shall be "deprived of life, liberty, or property, without due process of law."

However, some international law experts claimed that the attack that killed Khan was legal. Duke Law School professor Scott Silliman asserted that Awlaki's activity "put him in the category of a legitimate target," and University of Utah law professor Amos Guiora said, "This attack appears to have met the criteria of proportionality, military necessity and the absence of alternatives to be in full accordance with a state's right to aggressive self-defense."

Commenting on Khan's death, counter-terrorism expert Peter Bergen noted, "The fact that the editor of the magazine (Khan) has also been killed is a problem for al Qaeda in the Arabian Peninsula, particularly as it relates to their Western recruitment effort, because the two people who principally spoke to the Western world are now dead."

After Khan's death, his family released a statement criticizing U.S. government and asking, "Was this style of execution the only solution? Why couldn't there have been a capture and trial? Where is the justice? As we mourn our son, we must ask these questions."

== See also ==
- Faisal Shahzad
- David Headley
- Farooque Ahmed
- Islamic extremism in the United States
