= Killing of Abdulrahman al-Awlaki =

Death of American teenager in 2011

Abdulrahman al-Awlaki
- عبد الرحمن العولقي
- Born: Abdulrahman Anwar al-Aulaqi; August 26, 1995; Denver, Colorado, U.S.
- Died: October 14, 2011 (aged 16); Yemen
- Cause of death: Drone strike
- Father: Anwar al-Awlaki
- Relatives: Nasser al-Awlaki (grandfather); Nawar al-Awlaki (half-sister)

Abdulrahman Anwar al-Awlaki (also spelled al-Aulaqi, Arabic: عبد الرحمن العولقي; August 26, 1995 – October 14, 2011) was a 16-year-old United States citizen who was killed by a U.S. drone strike in Yemen, two weeks after his father, Anwar al-Awlaki, a key organizer for the Islamist militant group al-Qaeda, was similarly killed. The US government says that the son was not the target of the attack, which was aimed at al-Qaeda militants.

== Death and aftermath ==
According to the United States government, Abdulrahman al-Awlaki's father, Anwar al-Awlaki, was a leader of al-Qaeda in the Arabian Peninsula. Anwar al-Awlaki was killed by a CIA drone strike several days before his son's death.

The U.S. drone strike that killed Abdulrahman Anwar al-Awlaki was conducted under a policy approved by U.S. President Barack Obama.

Two U.S. officials speaking on condition of anonymity stated that the target of the October 14, 2011, airstrike was Ibrahim al-Banna, an Egyptian believed to be a senior operative in al-Qaeda in the Arabian Peninsula. Another U.S. administration official speaking on condition of anonymity described Abdulrahman al-Awlaki as a bystander who was "in the wrong place at the wrong time", stating that "the U.S. government did not know that Mr. Awlaki's son was there" before the airstrike was ordered. When pressed by a reporter to defend the targeted killing policy that resulted in Abdulrahman al-Awlaki's death, former White House press secretary Robert Gibbs said "I would suggest that you should have a far more responsible father if they are truly concerned about the well-being of their children. I don't think becoming an al-Qaeda jihadist terrorist is the best way to go about doing your business."

Human rights groups questioned why Abdulrahman al-Awlaki was killed by the U.S. in a country with which the United States was not at war. Jameel Jaffer, deputy legal director of the American Civil Liberties Union, stated "if the government is going to be firing Predator missiles at American citizens, surely the American public has a right to know who's being targeted, and why."

== See also ==
- Killing of Nawar al-Awlaki
- Ibrahim al-Banna
- Targeted killing
- Disposition Matrix
- Drone strikes in Yemen
