= Shaker Elsayed =

- Title: Imam of Dar Al-Hijrah

Personal life
- Born: 1951 (age 74–75) Cairo, Egypt
- Education: University of Houston

Religious life
- Religion: Islam

Senior posting
- Period in office: June 1, 2005 – June 9, 2017
- Predecessor: Mohammed Adam El-Sheikh
- Previous post: Muslim American Society; Secretary General (2000–05)

Shaker Elsayed (born 1951) is an Egyptian–American imam who was posted at the Dar Al-Hijrah mosque in Falls Church, Virginia from 2005 to 2017, when he resigned because of backlash stemming from his comments about female genital mutilation. He was born in Cairo, Egypt.

== Educational background and scholarship ==
Elsayed has an undergraduate degree in economics and independent Islamic studies from Cairo, and has done graduate work in educational administration and psychology at the University of Houston in Texas. He has translated the Quran into English.

== Muslim American Society Secretary General ==
Prior to becoming imam at the mosque, Elsayed was Secretary General of the Muslim American Society (MAS) from 2000 to 2005. While still at MAS, in 2004 Elsayed was also on the mosque's executive committee.

Elsayed described the 2002 hunt by federal agents for evidence against Sami Al-Arian as "a war on Muslim institutions." Al-Arian ultimately made a plea agreement, pleading guilty to conspiracy to help a "specially designated terrorist" organization, the Palestinian Islamic Jihad.

When three defendants who were part of the Virginia jihad network were convicted in March 2004 of conspiring to help wage violent jihad in Kashmir and possibly against American troops in Afghanistan, Elsayed said "It is evident that Muslims should not expect justice. Muslims are besieged after 9/11, for no fault of their own."

In April 2005 Ali Al-Timimi went on trial for treason for verbally encouraging people to train for jihad and to attack the US. Elsayed said: "He is not accused of anything except talking. It's all about him saying something. If this isn't a First Amendment issue, I don't know what is." After Al-Timini's conviction, Elsayed said that "Ali never opened a weapon or fired a shot, and he is going to get life imprisonment for talking. What kind of country are we turning the United States into today?"

== Religious and political views ==
In 1990, he was the principal of the Al-Ghazly Islamic School in Jersey City. The children of El Sayyid Nosair, who was convicted in the 1993 World Trade Center bombing and the killing of Meir Kahane, attended the school until 1989. Elsayed said about Kahane's killing: "It was not a violation [of Islamic law], in the sense that Kahane adopted a position against all Arabs and Muslims. He put himself in that category."

Elsayed told worshippers, "Islam forbids you to give allegiance to those who kick you off your homeland, and to those who support those who kick you off your homeland,"and explained afterwards the statements are in opposition to US foreign policy, not against American people. At the same time Elsayed spoken strongly towards American patriotism, stating that Muslim Americans "are in love with their country" and stand firm in promoting their country's safety. "Shaker Elsayed is more like a political figure than a religious figure", said M.A. Muqtedar Khan of Adrian College in Michigan, who worshiped at the Dar Al-Hijrah mosque for several years. "Dar al-Hijrah is a very Arab-centric mosque, very much centered on Arab politics." Elsayed unequivocally condemns terrorism and states that the mosque actively publicizes it to the public.

Ahmed Omar Abu Ali, who was convicted of plotting to assassinate President George W. Bush, worshiped at Dar al-Hijrah. Elsayed spoke out on behalf of his family. He described Abu Ali's confession as "laughable", and said that Abu Ali and other young Muslims were being unfairly accused by the Justice Department.

In June 2017, he made comments suggesting that female genital mutilation prevents 'hypersexuality', but later apologized for his statements. He resigned as imam on June 9 over the incident.
