= Alexandria City Jail =

American jail facility

Coordinates: 38°47′52.5″N 77°3′52.7″W

Alexandria City Jail (formally William G. Truesdale - Alexandria Adult Detention Center) is a jail facility at 2001 Mill Road, Alexandria, Virginia, serving several courts and police agencies in Northern Virginia, including the U.S. District Court for the Eastern District of Virginia, commonly called the Alexandria federal court.

This facility is not owned or operated by the Federal Bureau of Prisons (BOP); the facility has an agreement with the U.S. Marshals Service.

== Notable prisoners ==
Defendants involved in federal criminal proceedings there are often housed in the jail, including (with approximate dates of incarceration):

- Wilbert Lee Evans (January 1981), Virginia death row inmate who was convicted of murdering a deputy sheriff while trying to escape the jail
- Lyndon LaRouche (October 1986 – December 1986), Presidential candidate, served 6 years of a 15-year sentence for fraud
- Aldrich Ames (February 1994 – April 1994), CIA officer sentenced to life for espionage
- William Aramony (March 1995 – April 1995), United Way of America CEO, served 6 years of a 7-year sentence for fraud
- Harold James Nicholson (November 1996), CIA officer twice convicted of espionage, sentenced to total of 33 1/2 years
- Robert Hanssen (February 2001 – May 2002), FBI agent serving 15 consecutive life sentences for espionage
- Zacarias Moussaoui (December 2001 – May 2006), French citizen, "20th hijacker" of 9/11 plot
- John Walker Lindh (June 2002 – August 2002), "American Taliban"
- John Allen Muhammad (2002 – 2009), "Beltway sniper"
- John Lee Malvo (November 2002), "Beltway sniper"
- Seifullah Chapman (2003 – 2004), U.S. Marine sentenced to 65 years in "Virginia Jihad" case, exonerated in 2018
- Iyman Faris, a.k.a. Mohammad Rauf (April 2003 – October 2003), Ohio truck driver sentenced to 20 years for plotting to destroy the Brooklyn Bridge with a blowtorch
- Dr. Ali al-Timimi (April 2005 – July 2005), biologist convicted in "Virginia Jihad" case
- Judith Miller (July 7, 2005 – September 29, 2005), N.Y. Times reporter jailed for refusing to name her source in Plame affair criminal investigation
- Ahmed Omar Abu Ali (February 2005 – March 2006), Saudi national sentenced to 30 years for plotting to assassinate George W. Bush
- Glenn Duffie Shriver (2012), American citizen convicted of offenses related in an attempt to be employed by the CIA to send information to the Chinese government
- Eric Harroun (March 2013 – September 2013), US citizen who fought for the Free Syrian Army and was allegedly compelled to fight for the al-Qaeda offshoot al-Nusra Front. After it became clear he wasn't fighting for a group classified as terrorist, he was released on minor charges.
- Marcel Lazăr Lehel (May 2016 – September 2016), Romanian national sentenced to 52 months for hacking
- Paul Manafort (July 2018 – )
- Maria Butina (August 2018 – )
- Chelsea Manning (March 2019 – 9 May 2019, 16 May 2019 – 12 March 2020) American activist and whistleblower in addition to being a former U.S. Army Soldier
- Jake Angeli, a.k.a. Jacob Chansley (February 2021 – July 2021), "QAnon shaman" American conspiracy theorist who participated heavily in the 2021 United States Capitol attack
- Allison Fluke-Ekren (sentenced to 20 years, 2022), American female jihadist
