= Johari Abdul-Malik =

First officially recognized Muslim chaplain in higher education in the U.S

Johari Abdul-Malik ibn Winslow Seale
- Born: Winslow Seale; Brooklyn, New York, U.S.
- Education: B.S.; M.S.; Ph.D. course work Howard University; Georgetown University Kennedy Center for Ethics
- Known for: first officially recognized Muslim chaplain in higher education in the U.S.
- Title: Imam
- Spouse: Mary
- Website: imamjohari.com

Johari Abdul-Malik Ibn Winslow Seale is a convert to Islam, and was previously the Director of Outreach for the Dar Al Hijrah Islamic Center in Northern Virginia from June 2002 until June 2017.

He is also the former Chair of the Coordinating Council of Muslim Organizations, the former head of the National Association of Muslim Chaplains in Higher Education, President of the Muslim Society of Washington, Inc., and a founding member of the Muslim Advocacy Commission of Washington, DC. In addition, he serves as the chair of government relations of the Muslim Alliance in North America.

== Early life ==
His mother is from northern Louisiana, and his father is from Barbados. Abdul-Malik was born and raised as an Anglican by his African American parents in Brooklyn, New York, until "at confirmation the teachings of the Ten Commandments exposed the inherent contradiction of western Christianity." He explored Taoism and "Asian spirituality" in high school.

While attending Howard University in Washington, DC, where he began in 1974 and received a BS in chemistry and an MS in Genetics and Human Genetics, he became a self-described Black activist, musician, and vegetarian, learning Transcendental Meditation. In graduate school he converted to Islam, and became President of the Muslim Student Association chapter at Howard. He completed his clinical post-graduate training program in Bioethics at the Georgetown University Kennedy Center for Ethics, completing his Ph.D. course work in Bioethics and Genetics.

Abdul-Malik performed Hajj in 1994.

== Muslim chaplain of Howard University ==
In November 1998, Abdul-Malik was named chaplain of Howard University. He served as the first officially recognized Muslim chaplain in higher education in the United States. Abdul-Malik resigned at the end of the spring 2004 semester. Abdul-Malik spoke as a panelist at the American Muslims for Global Peace and Justice's March 8, 2002 press conference, criticizing Israel's policy towards Palestine. He was also a panelist at a gathering that voiced its concerned of the murder charge that faced former chairman of the Student Nonviolent Coordinating Committee and later the militant Justice Minister of the Black Panther Party Jamil Abdullah Al-Amin (H. Rap Brown). Abdul-Malik publicly denounced a series of U.S. government raids of various northern Virginia Muslims' homes and offices in March 2002 that were launched in part to find evidence against Palestinian civil rights activist Sami Al-Arian.

== Dar al-Hijrah ==
In June 2002, Abdul-Malik joined the Dar al-Hijrah mosque as its Director of Outreach, and spokesman. The mosque uses a "team approach". He said: "It's important that there's an American at the mosque to speak with media, to defend Islam who can talk about the rights of Muslims. It would be difficult for us if we had an imam who didn't understand the process here."

Abdul-Malik denied claims that Dar al-Hijrah is a center of Islamic fundamentalism.

Abdul-Malik and Reverend Graylan Hagler created the Ramadan Feed-the-Needy Program in Washington, DC, an organization that gives food to 100 homeless every night during Ramadan. Following the federal charges against a Dar Al-Hijrah worshiper Ahmed Omar Abu Ali for plotting with members of Al Qaeda to assassinate President George W. Bush, after Abu Ali was imprisoned by Saudi officials for 20 months without charges under allegations of torture and later extradited to the United States, Abdul-Malik stated to the press in February 2005 that, "our whole community is under siege...they see it as a civil rights case" in response to escalating federal law enforcement investigations within the Northern Virginia Muslim community.

=== Reaction to Ali al-Timimi conviction ===
When in April 2005, Ali al-Timimi of Fairfax, Virginia, an American-born Muslim cleric, was convicted of inciting followers to wage war against the US just days after the terrorist attacks of September 11, 2001, and for recruiting for the Pakistani terrorist organization Lashkar-e-Toiba, and the paintball terrorist cell, Abdul-Malik said: "There is a view many Muslims have when they come to America that you could not be arrested for something you say. But now they have discovered they are not free to speak their minds. And if our opinions are out of vogue in the current climate, we feel we are all at risk." Al-Timimi was sentenced to life imprisonment.

=== TV spot against terrorism ===
After the July 2005 London bombings that killed 55 people, a 30-second public service TV spot was run called "Not in the Name of Islam," featuring Abdul-Malik and two American Muslim women. In the spot they said:

We often hear claims Muslims don't condemn terrorism and that Islam condones violence. As Muslims, we want to state clearly that those who commit acts of terror in the name of Islam are betraying the teachings of the Koran and the Prophet Mohammed. We reject anyone – of any faith – who commits such brutal acts and will not allow our faith to be hijacked by criminals. Islam is not about hatred and violence. It's about peace and justice.

=== Anti-terrorism press conference ===
In a press conference on July 25, 2005, Abdul-Malik said, "People who would go out and kill anyone, of any religion, from any country, of any age, for no reason other than the fact they are angry, isolated and upset is against God by whatever name you call [him]." He told reporters that the weekend before, when he attended his mosque, a young person told him someone had tried to "recruit" him, but Abdul-Malik said he had never heard of al Qaeda recruiting in his community. He said he told the youth, "You need to alienate yourself from those people. They're saying to you that they're your friend, and that you'll be their confidant, when in reality, they're going to sell you out."

=== Effort against domestic violence ===
In January 2008, Abdul-Malik was trying to establish a nationwide movement of Muslim men to lobby for the new interpretation of Chapter 4, Verse 34 of the Koran. The verse has long interpreted as giving husbands the right to beat their wives as the final step in an escalating series of punishments for being rebellious (following admonishing their wives, and then abandoning them in bed). "That is the linchpin, the fulcrum that justifies domestic violence in the Muslim context," he said. The new interpretation would interpret the verse as calling for women to be obedient to God.

=== Response to reactions to Fort Hood shooter ===
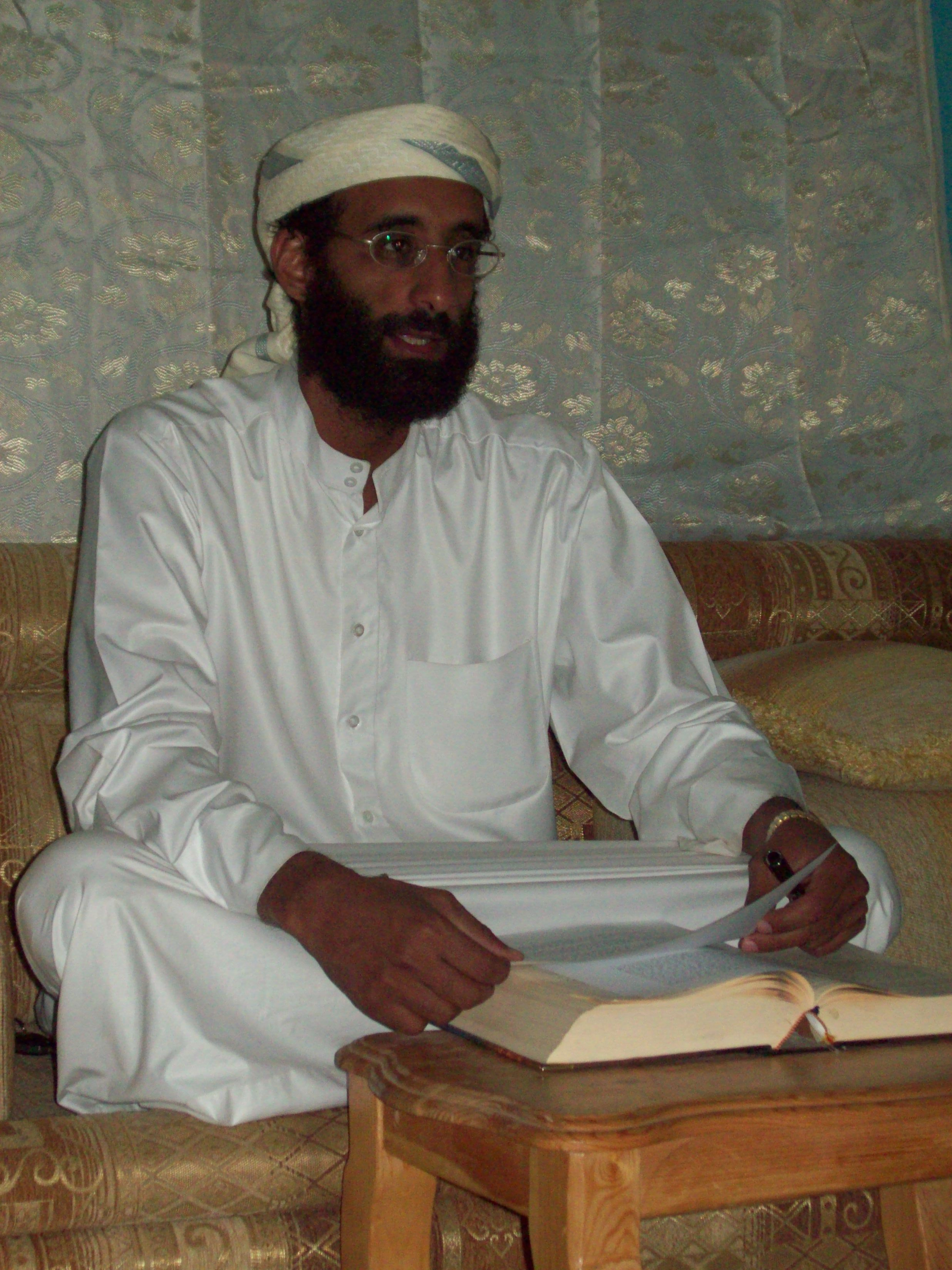
Anwar al-Awlaki

In November 2009, Abdul-Malik responded to former Dar al-Hijrah Imam Anwar al-Awlaki's support of the Fort Hood shooter by saying:

Al-Awlaqi ... supported the crime that Hasan committed and said that the US Muslims who opposed the crime have betrayed the Muslim ummah (the community of Muslims worldwide) and are hypocrites. I answer him by saying that he has thus separated himself from the Muslim community in the United States. The holy Koran teaches us that we as US Muslims should enrich the society we live in with humanitarian services, wisdom, teaching God's beautiful verses about love, mercy, and compassion to all mankind.

Abdul-Malik went on to say that of those who worshiped at the mosque,

Many of the immigrants focused on the conspiracy theory. Some said that Hasan did not commit the crime but that it was committed by other US military personnel who then killed him and said that he was the one who did it. They are like those who said that the 11 September attacks were not committed by those who committed them and that it too was a "conspiracy." I am one of those whose ancestors came here hundreds of years ago. I am a black American, and I know that "denial" is the explanation of those who cannot explain what they see or hear, especially if they belong to a minority group and are not used to the US way of life. But we black Americans have passed these stages. We became involved in political action and the President of the United States is now one of us. Perhaps I am saying what I am saying because I was a Christian and became Muslim. But I believe that this issue is a temporary one, and we ask God to raise us from one stage to another.

=== Reaction to Anwar al-Awlaki ===
Former colleague Abdul-Malik said in May 2010 that al-Awlaki "is a terrorist, in my book".

== Personal life ==
Abdul-Malik resides in the DC area with his wife and has 3 children.
