= Ali Asad Chandia =

Pakistani-American teacher convicted of supporting terrorists (born 1976)

- Born: 1976 (age 49–50); Lahore, Pakistan
- Status: Released
- Criminal charges: Providing material support for terrorism
- Penalty: 15 years in prison plus 3 years of supervised release

Details
- Imprisoned at: FCI Terre Haute

Ali Asad Chandia (born 1976 in Lahore, Pakistan) is a Pakistani-American former teacher at Al-Huda school in College Park, Maryland. Chandia was accused of providing material support for terrorism to Lashkar-e-Taiba, an internationally-designated Pakistani terrorist organization. On June 6, 2006, a jury unanimously found Chandia guilty. He was sentenced to 15 years in prison, with three years of supervised release at the end of his incarceration, on three counts of conspiracy and providing material support to Lashkar-e-Taiba on August 30, 2006. Assistant U.S. Attorney David H. Laufman and Department of Justice Trial Attorney John T. Gibbs, who prosecuted the case, had sought a sentence of 30 years to life.

== Personal ==
Chandia moved from Pakistan to the U.S. in 1994 at the age of seventeen. He attended Watkins Mill High School in Gaithersburg, Maryland. The mother of one of his high school friends said he moved toward Muslims, who had a similar culture. She spoke anonymously because some of Chandia's supporters were against interaction with the media. The mother said Dar al-Arqam mosque "became a community center" for Chandia and his friends "because they're not really comfortable with the opposite sex. That's a cultural thing." He attended Montgomery College from fall 1995 through spring 2000, becoming increasingly religious, and serving as the president of the Muslim Students' Association from 1998 to 1999.

The Washington Post reported that Chandia graduated from the University of Maryland University College with a bachelor's degree in information systems management in May 2005, but university spokesman Neil Tickner said there were no university records to confirm his enrollment at this university, and that "the name 'Ali Asad Chandia' does not show up anywhere in the database. Either his name was spelled differently or he wasn't a student here."

Chandia taught Arabic at Al-Salik Institute in College Park sometime before working at Al Huda. Minhaj Hason, a spokesperson for Dar-Us-Salaam, the umbrella organization for Al-Huda, said Chandia was "one of our best teachers" in the boys section of the Muslim school.

Chandia has a son, born in 2004, and a stepdaughter, born in 2000.

== United States vs. Chandia ==
Chandia was alleged to have provided material support to Lashkar-e-Taiba, and helped Ali al-Tamimi, the spiritual leader of the Virginia Jihad Network, by scheduling speaking engagements, providing 50,000 paintballs to assist in training terrorists, and introducing Tamimi's Network to Lashkar-e-Taiba. Special Agent Christopher Mamula led the Washington, D.C. and Baltimore field offices of the FBI, in conjunction with the Anti-Terrorist Branch of New Scotland Yard in the United Kingdom, in investigating the case. Dar-us-Salaam members helped organize a fundraiser and website for Chandia under the Ali Asad Support Committee.

According to trial evidence, Chandia quit his job at Costco between September and November 2001, giving a handwritten explanation to his boss that said, "I have to leave now due to some family emergency." Chandia visited Lashkar-e-Taiba's headquarters in Lahore, Pakistan, after Tamimi urged him, in November 2001 to February 2002. Chandia's attorney Marvin Miller claimed Chandia only flew to Pakistan to organize his brother's wedding. In February 2002, Chandia picked up Mohammed Ajmal Khan, a Lashkar-e-Taiba official now serving nine years in prison in Britain, at Reagan National Airport. In March 2003, Chandia helped Khan deliver 21 boxes of paintballs and unknown goods from Chandia's house to a shipping company in Sterling, Virginia, which mailed them to Pakistan for US$761.84, which Chandia paid. Chandia allowed Khan to use his computer to buy unmanned aerial vehicles, night vision equipment, wireless video cameras and US$17,000 of Kevlar anti-ballistic material.

Federal authorities raided his home in Gaithersburg on May 8, 2003 after finding evidence of his involvement in terrorist organizations. FBI agents found books about violent jihad and recordings in Chandia's home and car glorifying terrorism, an audiotape by al-Timimi justifying the Taliban's destruction of ancient Buddhist statues, and a recording that asked God to "grant safety to Osama bin Laden." FBI agents found a CD on the front seat of Chandia's Dodge Neon showing the September 11 attacks with voices dubbed in shouting "God is Great" in Arabic. Marvin Miller, Chandia's attorney, claims that 97% of what was found in Chandia's home was harmless and parts of Chandia's library were taken out of context. U.S. Attorney Chuck Rosenberg released a statement saying the findings "manifested his commitment to commit violent jihad... Terrorist organizations like Lashkar-e-Taiba rely on a network of individuals to carry out their deadly operations. Ali Asad Chandia was a member of that network for Lashkar-e-Taiba, and he will now spend a very long period of time in prison for providing material support in furtherance of its violent agenda."

He was released on bond on September 20, 2005, despite the prosecutor's objections, and ordered not to leave the United States. He was tracked by a GPS bracelet and U.S. Magistrate Judge Theresa Carroll Buchanan decided his mother's house would serve as collateral. Miller accused prosecutors of unfairly considering Chandia a flight risk. "The federal government decided suddenly and miraculously overnight he became a flight risk."

=== Conviction, sentencing, and appeals ===
On June 6, 2006, the jury selected for Chandia's trial unanimously found him guilty on three counts of conspiracy and providing material support to Lashkar-e-Taiba. He was found not guilty of the charge of going to Pakistan to fight for a terrorist organization.

Federal prosecutor David Laufman told U.S. District Judge Claude M. Hilton at sentencing on August 25, 2006, that "the defendant portrays himself as a mild-mannered, kind individual." Laufman concluded the tape recordings glorifying Osama bin Laden's terrorist activities were representative of "who the defendant really is."

At his sentencing hearing, Chandia said, "God knows well that I did not support any terrorists. Those who participated in making my children orphans ... should just remember that the day of judgment is on the way. If my parents should die before me, I ask my mother to plead and complain to Allah that a piece of her heart was taken away because of some toy paintballs."

The trial judge sentenced Chandia to 15 years in prison, with three years of supervised release at the end of his incarceration for the three offenses. Chandia appealed his sentence, his attorney arguing on appeal that Chandia was not prohibited from freedom of association, even with terrorist organization, that evidence did not support the charges and that Chandia did not participate in violent acts and was therefore not eligible for a "terrorist enhancement" on sentencing. The Court of Appeals turned down the constitutionality, did not dispute the evidence, but did send the case back to the trial judge to be resentenced according to guidelines. Ultimately the Court of Appeals twice sent the judgment back to the trial judge to reconsider the long sentence, but the trial judge did not change the sentence and resentenced Chandia in 2011 to 15 years in prison. The trial judge's reasoning included that Chandia knew that the organization was a terrorist organization, aware of its violent intentions, and that Chandia assisted Khan, a leader of the organization. During this time period, in 2008, the organization had launched an attack in Mumbai that killed 166 people.

Chandia appealed his case a third time, and his appeal was turned down in 2012, with the appeals court stating that the lower court had followed its previous instruction on reconsidering and explaining the term of sentence.

=== Reactions ===
Muddasar Ahmed, a Beltsville consultant and supporter of Chandia, said, "If this is how you deliver justice, you lose your trust in the justice system." According to Mary Beth Sheridan of The Washington Post, "Ahmed and others have also argued that the prosecutions show a fundamental misunderstanding of Muslims in America: The local men wanted to help oppressed Muslims overseas, which isn't the same as backing bin Laden."

Minhaj Hason stated "This is just one in a huge slew of cases like this. We feel the juries are making their decisions based on paranoia. From our perspective as a community... we're basically feeling besieged by overzealous prosecution."

Timimi told the FBI in a voluntary interview prior to his arrest in 2004, that, "In those days, young men [in the D.C. area] were very interested in jihad and martyrdom." Chandia, Timimi said, "used to ask hundreds of questions regarding jihad."

McNulty said in an interview in 2005, when he was the U.S. attorney in Alexandria, "These individuals established strong relationships [and] received ideological and physical training" from Lashkar-e-Taiba. "At the very least, they became a kind of infrastructure of support for international terrorists."

=== Release ===
Chandia was released from prison on July 19, 2019.
