= Esam Omeish =

Libyan–American surgeon

Esam S. Omeish
- Born: December 19, 1967 (age 58); Tripoli, Libya
- Education: Georgetown University; Georgetown University School of Medicine
- Occupation: Surgeon
- Employer(s): Inova Alexandria Hospital; Washington County Hospital; Esam S Omeish MD PC (President)
- Known for: Former Chief of General Surgery at Inova Alexandria Hospital; Former President of Muslim American Society; 2009 State Assemblyman primary election candidate in the 35th District of the Virginia House of Delegates.
- Political party: Democratic
- Board member of: Dar al Hijrah Islamic Center
- Spouse: Badria Kafala
- Children: Abrar, Anwar, Yousof, Ibrahim
- Website: omeishfordelegate.com

Esam S. Omeish (born December 19, 1967) is a Libyan–American surgeon and chief of the Division of General Surgery at Inova Alexandria Hospital since 2006. He is also a member of the Board of Directors of the Dar Al-Hijrah mosque and former President of the Muslim American Society (MAS).

As President of the MAS in 2005, Omeish represented the organization at a news conference announcing an anti-terrorism campaign launched by a coalition of US-based Muslim groups.

In August 2007, Virginia Governor Timothy M. Kaine appointed Omeish to the Virginia Commission on Immigration. In 2009, he unsuccessfully ran for State Assemblyman in a primary election in the 35th District of the Virginia House of Delegates.

== Education and family ==
Esam Omeish was born in Tripoli, Libya. In 1982 he immigrated at the age of 15 with his family to the United States, not knowing any English. They settled in Falls Church, Virginia, where he attended J. E. B. Stuart High School. He and his brothers started the first Muslim Friday prayers in a high school in the Washington, DC area. He finished secondary school in two and half years, excelled in gifted programs and advanced placement courses, and graduated with a near perfect grade point average.

He attended Georgetown University. Upon graduating with a double major in government and biology in 1989, Omeish attended the Georgetown University School of Medicine. He was the only foreign student to gain admission from a pool of over 6000 candidates for less than 180 positions.

Omeish helped start the first chapter of the Muslim Students Association (MSA) at Georgetown. He chaired the MSA Council for the Washington, DC, metropolitan area during his years as a student at Georgetown.

A medical first responder to the events of the September 11 attacks, he was the surgeon on call at Alexandria Hospital.

== Marriage and family ==
His wife is Badria Kafala, a scientist with a Ph.D. in molecular genetics. They have four children as of 2026: Abrar, Anwar, Yousof, and Ibrahim. In 2008 their daughter Anwar participated in an episode on discussing the legacy of Rev. Dr. Martin Luther King Jr. on The Oprah Winfrey Show. The show included children from across the U.S., of different ethnic, racial, and religious backgrounds. Their youngest child, Ibrahim (21 as of 2026), is in his second year of university and is involved in the community MSA, following in his father's footsteps.

== Islamic leader ==
=== Dar al-Hijrah ===
Omeish is a former vice president and current board member of the Dar al-Hijrah mosque in Falls Church. He has consistently worked against extremist elements within the Muslim community, emphasizing that "we...are uniquely positioned and equipped to provide a comprehensive, multifaceted approach in proactively combating terrorism and eliminating its scourge." According to Omeish, the mainstream Islamic community needs to protect itself from extremist ideology and violent action.

In 2000, Esam Omeish was among those who recommended the board of directors hires Anwar al-Awlaki as the mosque's imam; at the time the American-born cleric espoused moderate Muslim views and appeared to bridge the American and Muslim cultures. Omeish said in 2004 that he was convinced that al-Awlaki: "has no inclination or active involvement in any events or circumstances that have to do with terrorism."

In 2004, at 36 years of age, Omeish was the youngest member of the mosque's Board of Directors. He said then that the mosque leadership needed to be more open and inclusive of younger people, including women. "The bottom line is that this is a mosque that is in the heart of Washington," he said. "Our goal is to make the congregation reflect that reality."

Omeish acknowledged that some mosque members raised reasonable questions about the mosque's constitution. In 2004, proposals for change under consideration included direct elections to the mosque's board of directors, director term limits, and phasing out the board seats that the constitution assigns to officials of certain Muslim organizations. As of December 2009, Omeish was still a member of the mosque's Board of Directors. In early 2010, he resigned from the Board of Directors because of lack of major reform in the center's policies.

=== Muslim American Society ===
In 2004, as President of the Muslim American Society, Omeish wrote a letter to The Washington Post in which he took issue with "inaccuracies" in the definition of the Muslim Brotherhood published by the paper. It was discussed in John Mintz and Douglas Farah's article, "In search of friends among the foes, US hopes to work with diverse group," (September 11, 2004). Omeish wrote,

The moderate school of thought prevalent in the Muslim Brotherhood represents a significant trend in Islamic activism in the United States and the West, and we in MAS accordingly have been influenced by that moderate Islamic school of thought as it applies to our American identity and relevance for our American reality.

Daveed Gartenstein-Ross, in an opinion editorial he wrote for the Weekly Standard, responded,

Omeish ... wrote that the reason MAS draws inspiration from the Muslim Brotherhood is 'in order to espouse the values of human dialogue, tolerance, and moderation.' Yet both MAS's curriculum and also the scholars that MAS requires its members to read openly flout these values.

As President of the MAS in 2005, Omeish represented the organization at a news conference announcing an anti-terrorism campaign launched by a coalition of US-based Muslim groups. He told reporters: "The fact of the matter is we know of no sleeper cells, we don't know of that phenomenon to exist in our community." He attributed this success in part to the teaching of moderate, authentic Islam: "What has protected our community far before 9/11 from extremism and violent ideology is that balanced mainstream advocacy of Islamic principles." He was President of MAS through 2007, but resigned in 2008.

== Political career ==
=== Controversy regarding resignation from Virginia commission ===
In 2007, Omeish earned the prestigious "Outstanding Physician of the Year" award. That same year, Virginia Governor Timothy M. Kaine appointed him to the Virginia Commission on Immigration, which was evaluating issues related to illegal immigration.

Following public revelations of controversial remarks by Omeish in several videos, which criticized Israel and the United States government and appeared to encourage jihad, Kaine asked for Omeish's resignation from the commission on September 27, 2007, and he complied. A caller noted Omeish's remarks when the governor appeared on a radio show.

In one video, Omeish said to Washington-area Muslims, "you have learned the way, that you have known that the jihad way is the way to liberate your land." In another, he praised Palestinians for giving up their lives for Allah.

Omeish was filmed at an August 12, 2006, rally in Washington near the White House, denouncing Israel's invasion of Lebanon that year and the "Israeli war machine." He accused Israel of genocide and massacres against Palestinians, and said the "Israeli agenda" controlled Congress.

In accepting the doctor's resignation, Kaine said, "Omeish is a respected physician and community leader, yet I have been made aware of certain statements he has made which concern me." He added that background checks of commission nominees would be more thorough in the future.

Omeish told a news conference that jihad traditionally was not about violence, but about the inner struggles leading to spiritual triumph. Omeish said his remarks were "taken out of context." He said Kaine was reacting to "speech excerpts taken out of context by proponents of a relentless campaign of ... Islamophobia." He accused his critics of perpetrating a "smear campaign" against him. The political commentator Cal Thomas disputed Omeish's assertion that his remarks were "taken out of context," saying that the meaning of the controversial phrase was clear.

After Omeish resigned, Delegate. C. Todd Gilbert's office released a statement entitled, "Kaine Appointee on Board of Directors of Radical 9-11 Mosque", referring to the Dar Al Hijrah mosque.

=== Candidacy for state assemblyman ===
In 2009 Omeish ran for State Assemblyman in the Democratic Party primary election in the 35th District of the Virginia House of Delegates. Omeish raised $143,734 for his campaign from January 1 to May 27, 2009 ($52,000 of which was his personal money), the fourth-largest amount of fundraising statewide among all Virginia House of Delegates candidates. His third-highest contributor was the International Institute of Islamic Thought.

Upon starting his political candidacy, Omeish said, "I love Virginia and I've been involved in community activities since I came here. My candidacy is a continuation of a lifelong passion for public and community service." He also said, "As a physician and health care provider, I think this year health care is going to be one of the major issues we bring to the General Assembly."

Omeish came in third in the primary on June 8, 2009, with 1,039 votes (15.7%).

=== Clinton call ===
In June 2009, United States Secretary of State Hillary Clinton invited Omeish to join 100-200 invitees on a conference call that was billed as a forum in which to discuss relations between the United States and the Muslim community. Omeish expressed his support for President Barack Obama, and said that Muslim-Americans needed to get more involved in politics. A press statement from his campaign office included a message from him expressing his hope that,

[...] my friends on the far right and even some of those in the media, that continue to try and distort my record and my name, and continue to distort public perceptions of the Muslim community, will realize that we have a president and an administration, along with most of the American people, that are ready to move beyond divisive politics.
