= Harroun (surname) =

Harroun is a surname of English and Irish origin deriving from the name Herron. Notable people with the name include:

- Eric Harroun (1982–2014), American Jihadist in the Syrian Civil War
- Ray Harroun (1879–1968), American racecar driver and pioneering constructor

== See also ==
- Harroun, American automobile in production from 1917 to 1922
