= MSW =

MSW may stand for:

== Businesses and organisations ==
- Manatawny Still Works, a craft distillery in Pottstown, Pennsylvania, United States
- Massawa International Airport, Eritrea (by IATA code)
- Ministry of Interior (Poland) (Polish: Ministerstwo Spraw Wewnętrznych)
- Muslim Society of Washington, a religious organization based in the United States

== Science and technology ==
- Metres sea water, a unit of pressure
- Mikheyev–Smirnov–Wolfenstein effect, in particle physics
- MSWLogo, an interpreted computer programming language
- Machine Status Word, a data segment in the Intel 286 LOADALL instruction set
- Microsoft Windows, an operating system

== Other uses ==
- Mao Shan Wang, a popular cultivar of durian
- Master of Social Work, a postgraduate qualification and academic title
- Municipal solid waste
