= Muslim Society of Washington =

Islamic organization based in the United States

The Muslim Society of Washington, DC, Inc. (MSW) is a non-profit 501(c)(3) organization founded to promote Islamic values.

Its president is Imam Johari Abdul-Malik, the outreach director for the Dar Al Hijrah Islamic Center in Northern Virginia.
