= Mahdi Bray =

American activist (1950–2024)

Wright Mahdi Bray
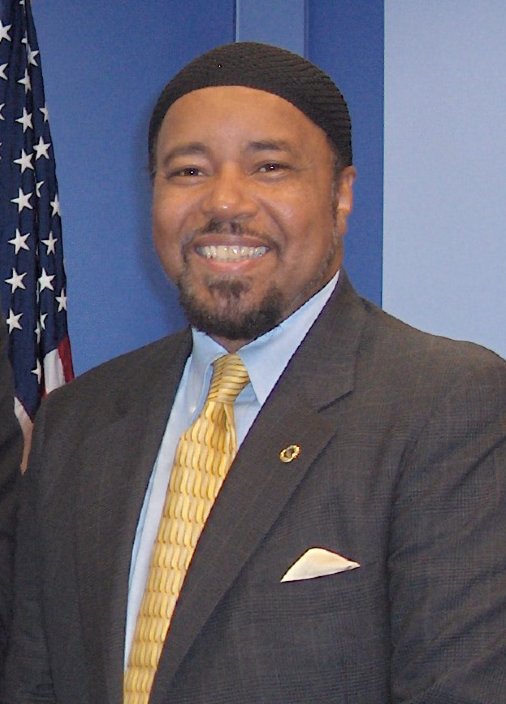
- Mahdi Bray
- Born: Wright Bray; January 9, 1950; Norfolk, VA
- Died: October 9, 2024 (age 74)
- Other names: Wrighty Bray, Jr.; Wright Bray IV; Herbert Bray
- Occupation: National Director
- Employer: American Muslim Alliance
- Website: Bray blog

Wright Mahdi Bray (born "Wright Bray" January 9, 1950 – October 9, 2024), was a Muslim American civil and human rights activist, the National Director of the American Muslim Alliance, and formerly served as executive director of the Muslim American Society's Freedom Foundation (MAS Freedom) based in Washington, DC. The foundation supported Muslim activists and religious leaders who have been arrested.

== Political activism ==
Bray used to be political director of the Muslim Public Affairs Council (MPAC).

In 2001 Bray served as a liaison with United States President George W. Bush's White House Faith-Based Initiative Program, which he later opposed. After the September 11 attacks, he and other Muslim leaders met with then-U.S. Attorney General John Ashcroft. He also served as a congressional affairs representative on behalf of the Muslim community.

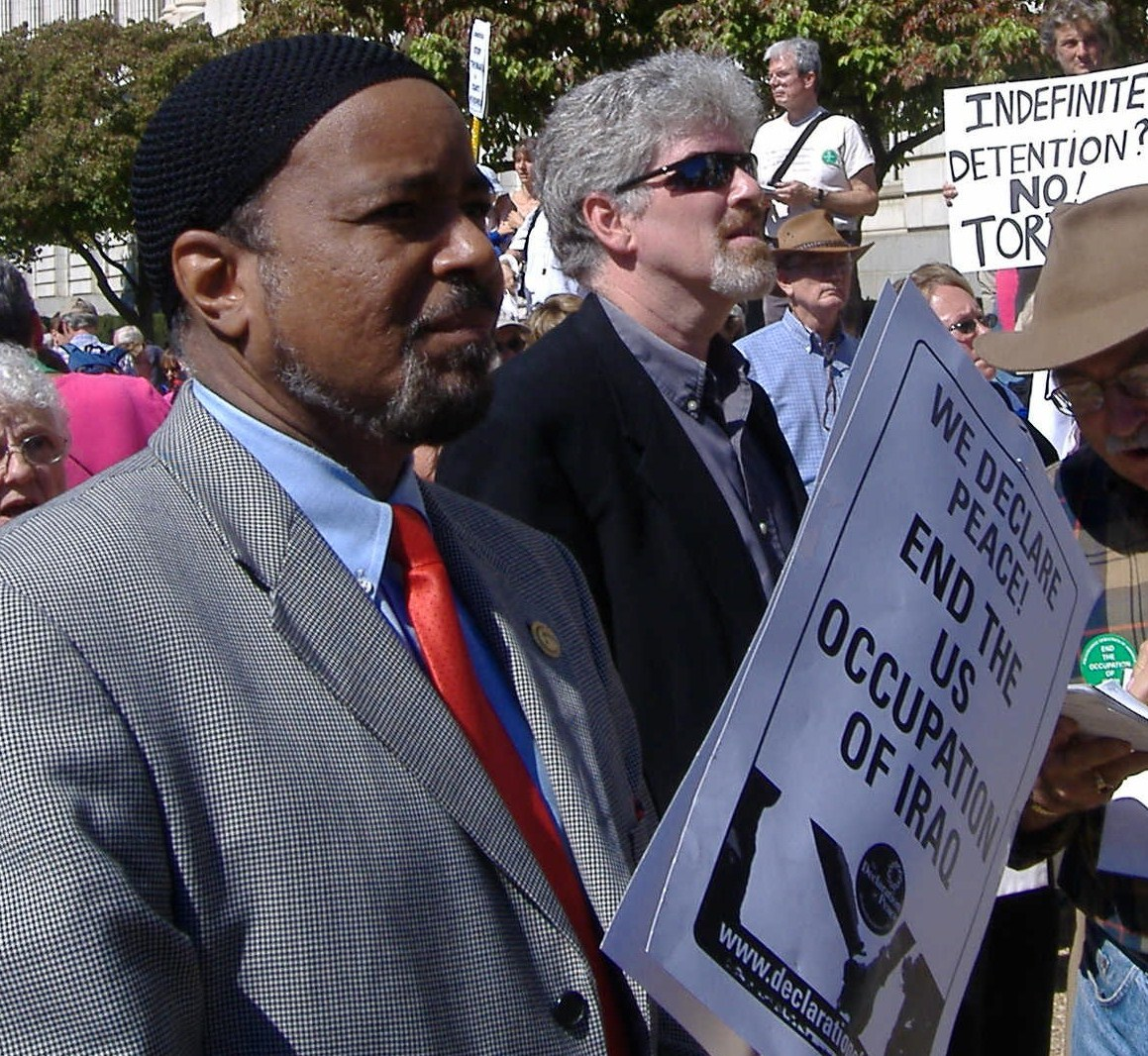
Mahdi Bray at 2006 peace protest.

Bray served on the board of directors of the Interfaith Alliance and the National Interfaith Committee for Worker Justice, and is a National Co-convener of Religions for Peace-USA. He is a Washington, DC, television and radio talk show host, and has appeared on CBS News, Fox, MSNBC, CNN, C-SPAN, Aljazeera, and many TV and radio talk shows. Bray also organized protests against the U.S. war in Afghanistan, the Iraq war, and the Israeli occupation of the West Bank and Gaza.
