= Mohammed Adam El-Sheikh =

Mohammed Adam El-Sheikh (January 1, 1945 - April 14, 2024) was the Sudanese American executive director of the Fiqh Council of North America.

== Biography ==
El-Sheikh was born in Sudan.

=== Education ===
El-Sheikh graduated from the faculty of Shari'ah and Law of Omdurman Islamic University, Sudan, in 1969. In 1973 he was appointed by the Department of Justice to serve as a judge for the Shari'ah Courts. While in the Sudan he was a member of the Muslim Brotherhood.

In 1978, he was granted a scholarship to come to the United States in order to continue his higher education. He received his Masters of Comparative Jurisprudence (MCJ) from Howard University in 1980, his LLM from the National Law Center at George Washington University in 1981, and his Ph.D. in Comparative Jurisprudence from Temple University in 1986. His 1986 Ph.D. dissertation at Temple University was on "The applicability of Islamic penal law (qisas and diyah) in the Sudan."

=== Career ===
From 1983–1989 and 1994–2003, El-Sheikh was the imam at the Islamic Society of Baltimore in Catonsville, Maryland.

El-Sheikh was instrumental in founding the Muslim American Society in the US, in 1992, along with some other former members of the Muslim Brotherhood. He said that when they founded the society the founders' goals had changed, in that they no longer needed to operate secretly as they had in other countries when they were members of the Muslim Brotherhood. He said the founders felt "we should cut relations with the [Brotherhood] abroad and regard ourselves as Americans. ... We don't receive an order from any organization abroad, and [they] have no authority to tell us what to do".

He also helped launch the Dar Al-Hijrah mosque in Falls Church, Virginia, and later was the Imam of the mosque between August 2003 and May 2005. Commenting in 2004 on the beheadings of American hostages Nick Berg and Daniel Pearl, he said:

beheadings are not mentioned in the Koran at all. According to Islamic penal law, killers will be sentenced to death, but the means of execution are not mentioned. ... we don't condone this. They are not following Islam. They are following their own whims.

And in 2004, speaking of Palestinian suicide bombers, he said "if certain Muslims are to be cornered where they cannot defend themselves, except through these kinds of means, and their local religious leaders issued fatwas to permit that, then it becomes acceptable as an exceptional rule, but should not be taken as a principle."

He left Dar Al-Hijrah in 2005 to become the executive director of the Fiqh Council of North America, an association of Islamic legal scholars. He is also the head of the Islamic Judiciary Council of the Shari'ah Scholars' Association of North America (SSANA).
