= Abd al-Rahman Abd al-Khaliq =

Egyptian-Kuwaiti Islamic scholar and preacher (1939–2020)

- عبد الرحمن عبد الخالق
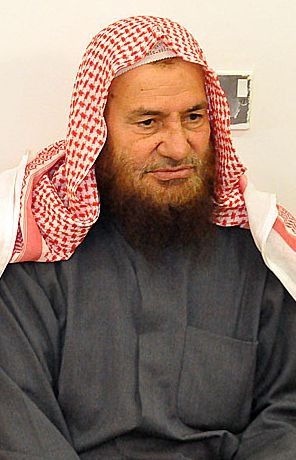

Personal life
- Born: 5 November 1939 Monufia, Egypt
- Died: 29 September 2020 (aged 80) Kuwait City, Kuwait
- Occupation: Islamic scholar and preacher

Religious life
- Religion: Islam

Abd al-Rahman Abd al-Khaliq (Arabic: عبد الرحمن عبد الخالق) (5 November 1939 – 29 September 2020) was an Egyptian-Kuwaiti Islamic scholar and preacher. He published more than 60 books related to Islam, especially Salafism.

== Life ==
Abd al-Khaliq was born in Monufia, Egypt, on 5 November 1939. He was educated at the Islamic University of Madinah. He moved to Kuwait in 1965, where he was a teacher in Kuwaiti schools between 1965 and 1990. Then, he became an Islamic scholar at Society of the Revival of Islamic Heritage in Kuwait. On 31 October 2011, an amiri decree was issued to grant him the Kuwaiti nationality.

Abd al-Khaliq died on 29 September 2020 in Kuwait City, Kuwait, due to myocardial infarction.

== Books ==
He wrote more than 60 books, most of them about Islam, such as:

1. Shura under the Islamic system of government, (الشورى في ظل نظام الحكم الإسلامي)
2. Salafists and the Four Imams may God be pleased with them, ( السلفيون والأئمة الأربعة رضي الله عنهم )
3. Spotlight on our political situation, (أضواء على أوضاعنا السياسية)
4. The general issues to believe in the Qur’an and Sunnah, ( القضايا الكلية للاعتقاد في الكتاب والسنة)
5. The scientific origins of the Salafi call, ( الأصول العلمية للدعوة السلفية)
6. The response to those who denied the uniformity of names and adjectives, ( الرد على من أنكر توحيد الأسماء والصفات)
7. The way to rationalize the Islamic resurrection movement, ( الطريق إلى ترشيد حركة البعث الإسلامي)
8. A new approach to the study of monotheism, ( منهج جديد لدراسة التوحيد)
9. The obstacles to building the Islamic Nation, (العقبات التي تعترض بناء الأمة الإسلامية)
10. Chapters from Sharia’s Politics in the Call to Allah -modified version, ( فصول من السياسة الشرعية في الدعوة إلى الله- نسخة معدلة)
11. Atheism causes of this phenomenon and methods of treatment, ( الإلحاد أسباب هذه الظاهرة وطرق علاجها)
12. Plots of the life of Sheikh Al-Islam Ibn Taymiyyah,( لمحات من حياة شيخ الإسلام ابن تيمية)
13. The Obligation of Applying the Shariah's Hudud -modified version, ( وجوب تطبيق الحدود الشرعية-نسخة معدلة)
14. Sufi scandals, ( فضائح الصوفية)
15. The final say in the Ajal sale, (القول الفصل في بيع الأجل)
16. The impact of weak hadiths placed in the Aqidah, (أثر الأحاديث الضعيفة والموضوعة في العقيدة)
17. تحضير الأرواح كهانة قديمة في أسلوب عصري
18. المسلمون والعمل السياسي
19. القواعد الذهبية في حفظ القرآن وتدبره والفتح على الإمام
20. خطوط رئيسية لبعث الأمة الإسلامية (نسخة معدلة)
21. توجيهات تربوية مستقبلية لبناء الإنسان الصالح في الوطن العربي
22. الزواج في ظل الإسلام (باللغة العربية والفرنسية) "French Version Available"
23. الوصايا العشر للعاملين بالدعوة إلى الله سبحانه تعالى (نسخة معدلة)
24. مشروعية الجهاد الجماعي (نسخة معدلة)
25. الحد الفاصل بين الإيمان والكفر
26. الولاء والبراء
27. كلمات مضيئة في الانتفاضة الفلسطينية
28. شيخ الإسلام ابن تيمية والعمل الجماعي
29. أصول العمل الجماعي (نسخة معدلة)
30. هذه حكمة الإسلام في الأحكام الخاصة بالمرأة (باللغة العربية والإنجليزية) "English Version Available"
31. الرد على أسئلة توني بولدروجوفاك وتشكيكاته حول القرآن الكريم والنبي العظيم
32. فضائل أبي بكر الصديق
33. شهادة الإنجيل على أن عيسى عبد الله ورسوله وكلمته ألقاها إلى مريم وروح منه
34. أولويات العمل الإسلامي في الغرب
35. المقاصد العامة للشريعة الإسلامية
36. مشروعية الدخول إلى المجالس التشريعية وقبول الولايات العامة في ظل الأنظمة المعاصرة
37. حكم معاهدات الصلح والسلام مع اليهود، وموقف المسلم منها (باللغة العربية والإنجليزية) "English Version Available"
38. القواعد الذهبية في أدب الخلاف
39. المشوق في أحكام المعوق (باللغة العربية والفرنسية) "French Version Available"
40. تنبيهات وتعقيبات لسماحة الوالد الشيخ عبد العزيز بن عبد الله بن باز -حفظه الله- المفتي العام للمملكة العربية السعودية على بعض ما جاء في كتبي وأشرطتي
41. من خطب المنبر
42. أحكام التصوير في الشريعة الإسلامية
43. حقيقة الاحتفال بالمولد النبوي
44. الطريق إلى وحدة الأمة
45. أصول الدعوة إلى الله سبحانه وتعالى
46. موقف أهل السنة والجماعة من البدع والمبتدعة
47. الرد الوجيز على الشيخ ربيع بن هادي المدخلي وكتابه "جماعة واحدة لا جماعات وصراط واحد لا عشرات حوار مع الشيخ عبد الرحمن بن عبد الخالق"
48. مشكلاتنا التربوية في ضوء الإسلام
49. الصراط: أصول منهج أهل السنة والجماعة في الاعتقاد والعمل
50. نقض الفرية - الرد على ما أدعاه الشيخ عبد الله بن خلف السبت
51. البيان المأمول في علم الأصول
52. الجحيم رؤية من الداخل (باللغة العربية والإنجليزية) "English Version Available"
53. الأحكام الفقهية للمريض
54. الفكر الصوفي في ضوء الكتاب والسنة
55. حكم تولي المرأة الولايات العامة والاشتراك في المجالس التشريعية نائبة وناخبة
56. البرهان.. على أن تارك العمل -اختياراً- فاقد لأصل الإيمان وأن الكفر كما يكون بالقلب يكون بالعمل واللسان
57. ملامح المنهج المعتدل وأثر وسطيته في حياة المسلمين
58. ابن عربي صاحب كتاب (فصوص الحكم) .. إمام من أئمة الكفر والضلال
59. الحقيقة الصوفية
60. بين شيخ الإسلام ابن تيمية وابن عربي
61. كرامات الصوفية - الجزءان الأول والثاني

== Withdrawal of Kuwaiti citizenship ==
Four years after his death, in March 2024, Kuwaiti authorities announced the withdrawal of Kuwait citizenship from the children and grandchildren of Islamic scholar Abd al-Rahman Abd al-Khaliq, even though they were born in Kuwait.
