= Eric Harroun =

American volunteer combatant (1982–2014)

Eric Glenn Harroun
- Born: June 11, 1982; Colorado Springs, Colorado, U.S.
- Died: April 8, 2014 (aged 31); Phoenix, Arizona, U.S.
- Occupation: Rebel against Bashar al-Assad
- Known for: American volunteer fighter in the Syrian Civil War for Free Syrian Army and allegedly compelled to fight for the al-Nusra Front

Eric Glenn Harroun (June 11, 1982 – April 8, 2014) was an American volunteer fighter with the Free Syrian Army during the Syrian Civil War.

Harroun had consistent behavioral issues throughout his early life and career. He served in the United States Army between 2000 and 2003 in a non-combat role, but was honorably discharged after being injured in a car crash in which all occupants of the car were intoxicated. He began visiting various Middle Eastern countries in the mid-2000s. He formally converted to Islam around 2008, but drank alcohol at a bar to celebrate his conversion. He also did not stop smoking or consuming pork.

He fought in Syria for around two months in early 2013. Initially, he fought for the Free Syrian Army, an ally of the United States. However, after getting separated during a battle with the Syrian Arab Army, he was held by the al-Nasser brigade under the al-Aqsa Islamic Brigades and forced to fight for them. After being released and thinking he fought alongside al-Qaeda affiliate Al-Nusra Front, he entered a US consulate in Turkey and was compelled to return to the United States. There, he was controversially arrested and held in solitary confinement until September. He faced potential life in prison or execution.

After it became clear that he had not willingly fought for any groups classified as terrorist organizations by the United States, Harroun accepted a plea deal with only minor charges and was released. However, he was severely physically and mentally affected by the months in solitary confinement, and his health deteriorated. A few months afterwards, he died of an accidental drug overdose on April 8, 2014.

== Early life and education ==
Eric Harroun was born on June 11, 1982, in Colorado Springs, Colorado, to mother Shirley Ann and father Darryl Harroun. He had a younger sister, Sarah. His parents divorced around 2000.

Harroun had a troubled childhood. His father described him in an interview with The New Yorker as "just lost", and said that Harroun had been diagnosed with ADHD and bipolar disorder. In ninth grade, he was arrested for robbery and found with knives in his possession. After his mother reprimanded him, he choked her, leading her to call the police. He was bullied, had poor grades, and was eventually enrolled in a center for troubled youths. Eventually, he obtained his GED.

In a later account, Harroun claimed that he converted to Islam around the 6th grade while learning about the Middle East, but this claim has been disputed.

== Military career and discharge (2000–2013) ==
=== Military career (2000–2003) ===
From 2000 to 2003, Harroun served in the United States Army. He trained in the Fort Leonard Wood boot camp in Missouri. He reportedly wanted to become an infantryman, but he trained as a mechanic. He served in the Army's 568th Engineering Company, where he attained the rank of private first class, but was never deployed overseas.

He was troubled even while serving, with his military records indicating that he had a personality disorder. According to a fellow recruit and friend at the time, Harroun was on the verge of receiving a dishonorable discharge. Before this could happen, in April 2003, he became involved in a serious car crash near Manhattan, Kansas. He and the female driver of the car were reportedly both inebriated. He was airlifted to a nearby hospital where it was learned that his skull had been fractured, resulting in a metal plate being surgically inserted into his head.

=== Discharge and subsequent activities (2003–2013) ===
A few weeks afterwards, Harroun was honorably discharged. He received full military benefits and monthly disability payments of around $2,500 or $3,000. He then worked various jobs in sales and service positions; after saving up enough money from his disability payments and working, he would travel to the Middle East.

Harroun's behavioral problems allegedly rapidly escalated after he was discharged. Harroun's father claimed that the injury caused Harroun's depression and mood swings to worsen. His father acquired a restraining order against him. He dated a student that attended Arizona State University, but after they separated, he turned "borderline stalkerish". After the student refused to date him again, he shot himself in the abdomen, and later was arrested for trying to punch one of her friends. Afterwards, he was arrested twice for driving under the influence.

In 2005, he flew to Kuwait, hoping to become a private military contractor, checking a gun into his luggage. But authorities in Kuwait returned him home on the next flight. In summer 2008, he flew to Lebanon and allegedly began introducing himself as part Lebanese. He reportedly visited the Shatila Palestinian refugee camp near Beirut, and met with the camp's leader. This experience allegedly had a lasting impact on him, furthering his anti-authority views and creating a dislike of Israel. After returning to the US Harroun approached the Central Intelligence Agency and was allegedly in contact with a handler. In one instance he messaged Japanese photojournalist Hidetsugu Suzuki who accompanied him to the camp, asking, “Do you know any info on activities or groups that might pose a threat to American interests inside Shatila?" under the pretense of a school paper. Following the Camp Chapman attack he messaged his handler “Sorry to hear about your fellow agents in Afghanistan. Did you personally know any of them?” receiving the response “Yeah, that sucked in Afghanistan.”

In October 2008, he held a ceremony to formally convert to Islam, but his friends and family alleged that he was a particularly non-observant Muslim. Harroun reportedly drank alcohol at a bar to celebrate his conversion, regularly smoked, and did not stop consuming pork. The author and journalist Robert Young Pelton wrote that "Eric was a Muslim in much the same way someone who moves to a new city becomes a fan of a sports team in that city—it's a way to fit in".

He visited Lebanon in May 2010 and Prague in August, shortly before enrolling at the Pima Community College in Tucson, Arizona, for the Fall 2010 semester. A Fox News article alleged that Harroun began identifying as a Muslim around this time after becoming close to two Iraqi-American brothers, but Harroun disputed this claim. A man who claimed to be Harroun's neighbor in Tucson at the time alleged that he saw Harroun flying the Flag of Hezbollah from his balcony. Around this time, the FBI and CIA began tracking Harroun's activities.

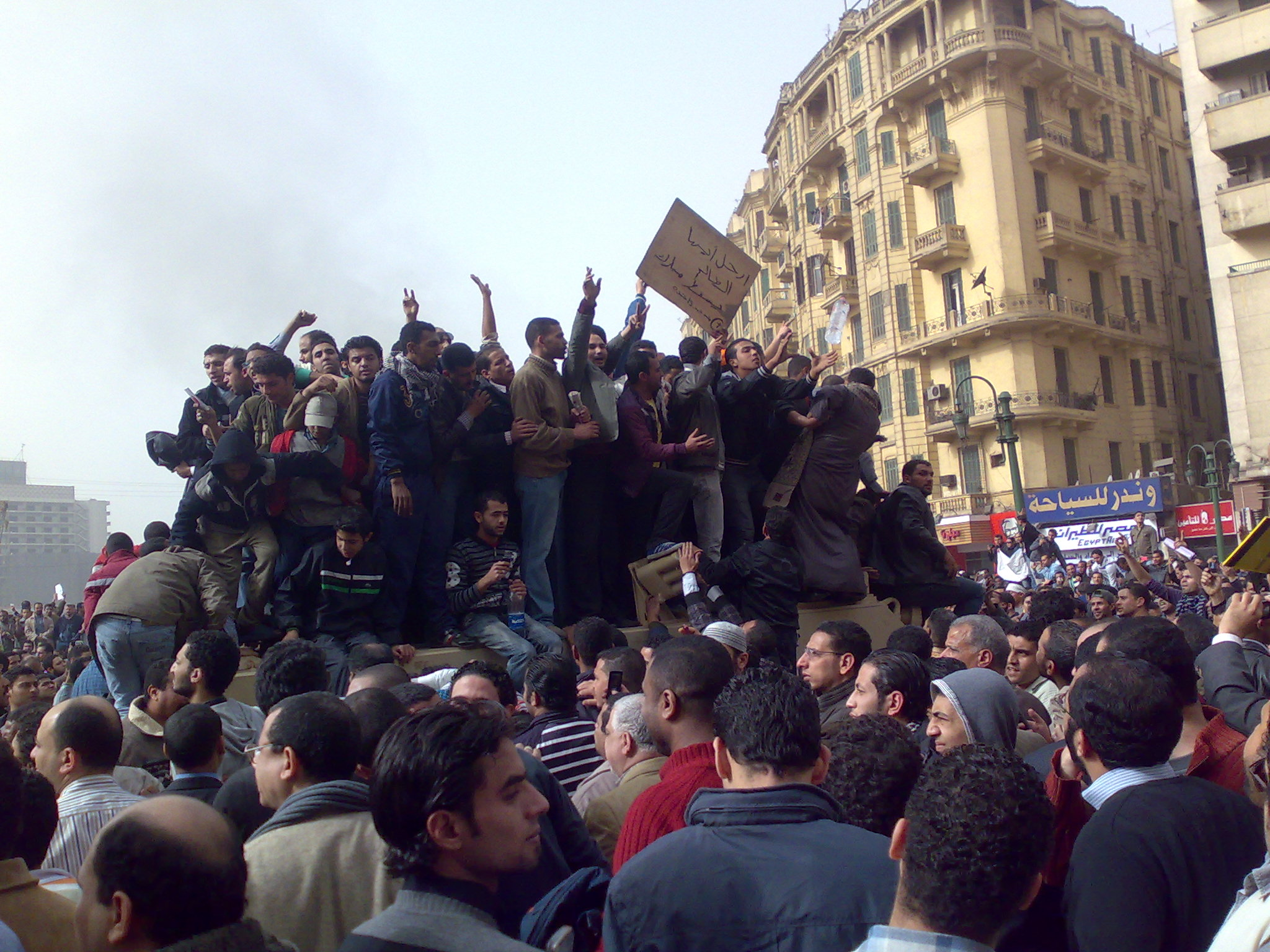
Protests at Tahrir Square on the "Day of Anger": the first day of the Egyptian Revolution (25 January 2011)

He visited Egypt around November 2010, at the cusp of the 2011 Egyptian revolution and the overall Arab Spring. On January 25, 2011, he posted pictures of himself in Cairo's Tahrir Square, participating in pro-democracy protests. He was twice arrested by Hosni Mubarak's security forces and detained. On February 14, from Beirut, he alleged that he had been held at gunpoint while in Egypt. He later visited Turkey in November 2012.

== Activities in Syria (2013) ==
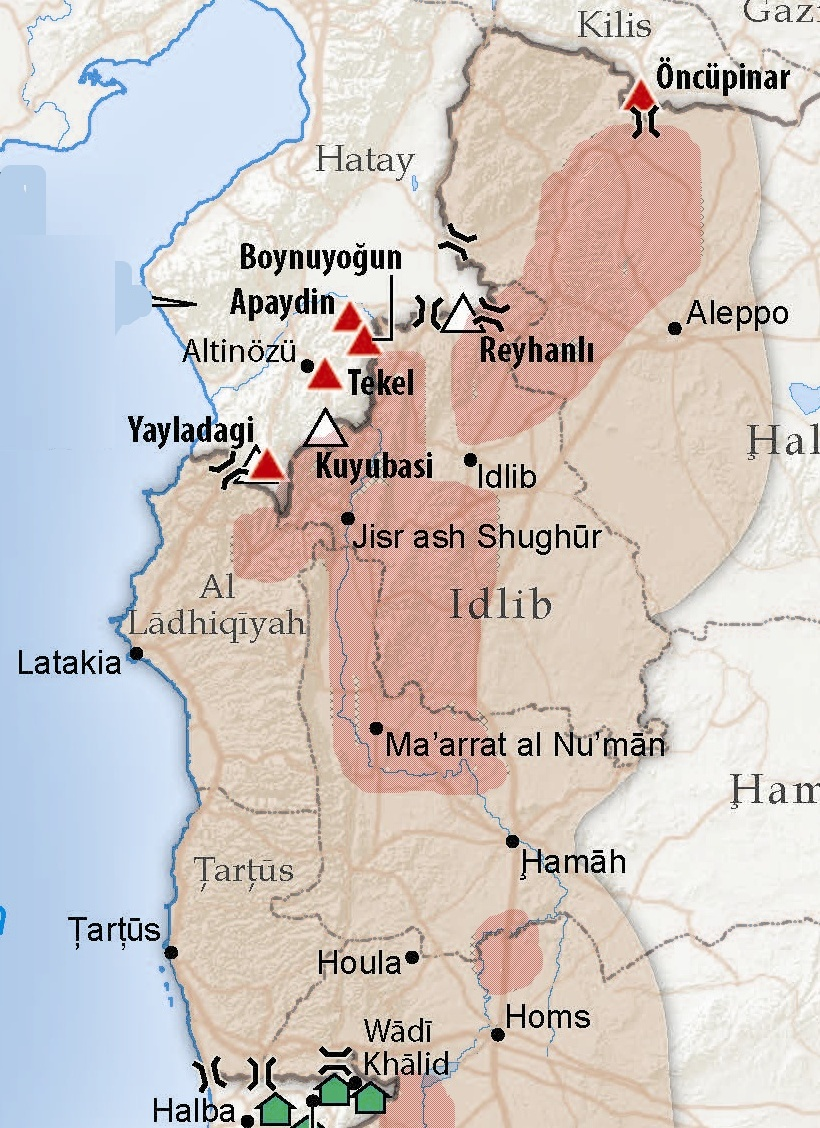
Map of rebel FSA-held territory (in red) in Syria, circa June 2012. In January 2013, Harroun entered Syria on foot via Kilis (top right of map). He then hailed a taxi to Azaz (not pictured in map), in between Kilis and Aleppo.

On January 7, 2013, Harroun crossed into Syria via its border with Turkey and made his way to the town of Azaz, twenty miles from Aleppo. He then allegedly joined the 'Amr ibn al-'As brigade, a faction of the US-backed Free Syrian Army (FSA). He neither spoke Arabic nor had combat experience. On January 10, 2013, he was then sent on an attack on a Syrian army camp with a group of fellow fighters. In the confusion of the fighting, he was separated from his group. He then mistakenly jumped onto the back of a truck belonging to a different faction, men he believed belonged to al-Nusra Front (an offshoot of al-Qaeda), and was taken back to their base. Harroun later stated:

I was separated from my unit in the fighting. I found these guys. I didn't even know they were al-Nusra until later. I said, "I need a ride back to my commander." It took 25 days to get them to give me a ride.

He alleged the fighters initially treated him as a captive, although he later gained their trust and joined them in attacking Syrian army units, in which he may have killed as many as ten soldiers. However, he denied willingly fighting for al-Nusra, claiming he did it out of expediency.

He posted many photographs and videos of his actions to social media sites (especially Facebook) showing himself handling various weapons (including RPG-7 rocket-propelled grenade launchers and AK-47 assault rifles), which were quickly picked up by many news sources. In one video posted online, he addressed Syrian president Bashar al-Assad directly, telling him his "days are numbered". In another, he and his group of fighters claimed victory for downing a helicopter. At one point, Harroun's sister Sarah left an encouraging message on his Facebook wall, urging him to "keep fighting", and showing solidarity with both her brother and the Syrian people.

Around a month later, he finally rejoined the FSA at their base on February 6. There, he discovered that his passport had been destroyed in a mortar attack. That day, he posted photographs to Facebook showing him and several FSA comrades. He left Syria on 10 February with a request from his commander to fetch weapons from Turkey and bring them back.

By late February, he made his way to Istanbul. He walked into the US Consulate, where he hoped to clear his name of suspicions that he was a terrorist and to simply request supplies and arms for the FSA. But instead, he was subjected to a series of interviews from the FBI and CIA over several days. Furious, Harroun blamed the interrogations on a previous interview he did with Fox News, and stated that he would have to "hire a fucking Jewish lawyer to sue their asses". In a later interview, Harroun stated "I'm not al-Qaeda. I like my beer and my smoke and I like my women. I'm not about the praying five times a day and all that shit." Around this time, in mid-March, a pro-Syrian government YouTube channel incorrectly claimed that Harroun had been killed, but it mistakenly identified another fighter as Harroun. Harroun denied his death in an email to MailOnline.

== Aftermath ==
=== Arrest and charges ===
Harroun was informed he could either return to the US or be arrested by Turkish authorities. He opted to return to the US. On March 27, 2013, he arrived at Dulles Airport in Virginia, where he was again interviewed by FBI agents. The following day, he was arrested at a hotel and booked at Alexandria City Jail, where he was placed in solitary confinement. A ten-page criminal complaint was filed against him by the FBI, charging him with using a weapon of mass destruction outside of the United States. If convicted, Eric could have received either the death penalty or life imprisonment.

He appeared in court with his public defender in a hearing on April 8 in Alexandria (Virginia) and was denied bail. At the hearing, prosecutor Carter Burwell said it would be illegal for an American to travel to Syria and take up arms against Assad's government with any opposition group. This echoed what he was previously told by the FBI officer at the US consulate, which had led Harroun to previously remark that it was "bullshit" that an American couldn't fight in Syria.

On June 20, he was indicted by a federal grand jury on the additional charge of conspiring to provide material support to a foreign terrorist group, which carried a maximum penalty of 15 years in prison. He appeared in court again on July 8, and was ordered by the judge to remain in detention, pending trial. In court, Harroun's lawyer Geremy Kamens claimed he was confused when he claimed to have joined al-Nusra, wanted to avoid extremists, spoke little Arabic, and actually joined the al Nasser (Victory) brigade (an associate of Jabhat al-Nusra which is not classed as a terrorist organization). However, the prosecution successfully argued that the four confessions Harroun had made to journalists were sufficient evidence due to the fact that they corroborated factual information, stating that the towns Harroun said he had been in were also strongholds of the al-Nusra front. The magistrate also maintained that he saw the confession as legitimate.

=== Reception and reactions in the media ===
Harroun was compared to various volunteer fighters, including Aukai Collins with the Chechen rebels, John Walker Lindh with the Taliban, and Matthew VanDyke with the Free Libyan Army. In regard to his arrest and former charges, Harroun's federal public defender Geremy Kamens said Harroun's case was "unique in American law" in that, "Never, to [Kamens'] knowledge, has the U.S. government charged a U.S. citizen for fighting with a group aligned with U.S. interests."

in the mainstream media, Harroun was routinely referred to as having 'joined al-Qaeda', and some of his quotes, photos, and videos were selectively used to portray him as a terrorist. Andrew J. Tabler, a specialist on Syria at the Washington Institute for Near East Policy, described Harroun as a war tourist and as pretty well-known to those following the Syrian war. He said "I saw those videos and thought, 'Buddy, you better watch out'".

Others were skeptical of Harroun's guilt. Robert Young Pelton stated in an article for Foreign Policy that Harroun was effectively "duped by the FBI into incriminating himself" due to his various postings about his activities on social media sites, and statements made to journalists and federal agents. Harold Maass emphasized that Harroun had never been known to voice any anti-American or extremist sentiments, and had even voiced a hatred of al-Qaeda and extremism. He also claimed that Harroun's error was fighting with the wrong people, in a way which was ironically aligned with US government interests. Robert M. Chesney of The New York Times also shared the belief that Harroun was "fighting on the U.S. side, but with the wrong people." James Joyner at Outside the Beltway also supported this narrative. He claimed that the charges were not sufficient to warrant Harroun's imprisonment for life. He described Harroun as being possibly "wacko", but also conceded that "based only on the reporting I've seen – he doesn't appear to be an al Qaeda sympathizer, much less a terrorist" and that "there's no evidence in the news reports that Harroun has engaged in terrorism or any anti-American activities". Facebook pages were also created in solidarity with Harroun.

Harroun's father claimed that his son was "100 percent American" and alleged that his son was cooperating with the CIA while in Syria. He described him as "definitely not al-Qaeda" and "very patriotic".

=== Plea deal and release ===
Harroun was offered several plea deals before his final offer, including 15 years in prison and 5 years in prison. He turned these down.

On September 20, 2013, Harroun accepted a plea deal to plead guilty to "an obscure law regulating munition exports". He was allowed to leave jail on time served, agreed to stay in touch with the FBI, and remain on probation for three years. This move surprised many in the media. He later agreed to an interview with ABC15 Arizona, in which he defended himself against the charges he had faced and spoke at length about his time in Syria.

Under probation Harroun was in regular contact with an FBI case-officer offering tips including illicit pill shipments to Mexico and information on people expressing a willingness to travel to Syria. Harroun's mother stated that after every meeting he would appear "distraught" and that “Eric did not like what they had him doing.”

Following his release from prison, Harroun was reportedly greatly affected by his six months in solitary confinement, and also felt betrayed by his country. He suffered from depression, and began using heroin and drinking heavily. He failed multiple drug tests, and his health rapidly deteriorated. On December 22, 2013, he was admitted into a hospital after being found in his bathroom with a syringe on the counter and having stopped breathing. He stayed in the hospital through Christmas. After being released from the hospital, he struggled to find an apartment to rent due to his criminal record and infamy.

Days before his death, Harroun said in an interview that he had finally received his passport back, purchased a car, and was excited to return to Syria.

== Death ==
On April 9, 2014, Harroun's family posted on his Facebook page announcing his death a day earlier from an accidental overdose. Harroun's autopsy revealed acute levels of heroin and sertraline, an antidepressant, in his body. Methamphetamine, amphetamine, codeine, and trazodone were also detected. The medical examiner ruled his death an accident.

He was buried in a funeral attended by friends, family, and uniformed soldiers. According to Harroun's mother, the FBI task-force officer monitoring Harroun expressed regret for Harroun's death. As of April 2023, his parents have kept his Facebook page open in his memory.
