= Ali al-Tamimi =

American Muslim preacher (1963–present)

Dr. Ali Al-Tamimi
- Born: Ali Al-Timimi; December 14, 1963 (age 62); Washington, D.C., US
- Education: George Washington University, (B.S.); University of Maryland, (B.S.); George Mason University, (Ph.D.)
- Occupations: Cancer researcher and Islamic teacher
- Judicial status: Acquittal on all counts March 3, 2026
- Status: Released from ADX Florence to home confinement September 1, 2020; FBP Register #48054-083
- Motive: Salafi Jihadism
- Conviction: As charged
- Criminal charges: 10 counts, including soliciting treason, and attempting to contribute services to the Taliban.
- Penalty: Life sentence

Ali Al-Tamimi (also Ali Al-Timimi; born December 14, 1963) is an American computational biologist and Islamic teacher from Fairfax County, Virginia, who was convicted of soliciting treason and attempting to contribute services to the Taliban based on comments he is alleged to have made to a group of followers at a private dinner shortly after 9/11. He was subsequently sentenced to life in prison in 2005. Al-Timimi was held in solitary confinement for more than fifteen years including over a decade under special administrative measures at the maximum security United States Penitentiary ADX Florence, Colorado. In August 2020, the district court ordered his conditional release into home confinement pending appeal after concluding that his case raised substantial legal issues. His direct appeal was filed on August 1, 2025 in the Fourth Circuit after twenty years in the district court, and in January 2026 his conviction was overturned on First Amendment grounds.

== Early life and education ==
Al-Timimi was born in 1963 and grew up in the Palisades neighborhood of Washington, DC, where he attended Georgetown Day School until age fifteen. His father (d. 2010), an attorney, was the cultural attaché at the embassy of the then Kingdom of Iraq. His mother, a mental health specialist with a doctorate in special education, initially taught at St. John's Child Development Center for intellectually disabled children. Later in the mid-1970s, she was a dean at Mt. Vernon College for Women.

One of Al-Timimi's teenage friends was the son of journalist Milton Viorst, who later wrote in The Atlantic that the family was "not particularly ethnic or religious," and that Al-Timimi celebrated holidays such as Halloween and Christmas with his brother and other friends at school. Viorst writes that Al-Timimi's parents were both practicing Muslims, but spoke English rather than Arabic at home and "did not push religious observance on the children."

At age fifteen, in 1978, Al-Timimi's parents moved the family to Riyadh, Saudi Arabia for three years to expose them to their Arabic and Islamic heritage. Al-Timimi attended Manarat Riyadh High School, where he learned Arabic and studied Islam under Bilal Phillips. In Saudi Arabia, Al-Timimi became influenced by Salafism, a reform branch of Sunni Islam that advocates strict adherence to the Quran and Sunna (the teachings of the Prophet).

In 1981, Al-Timimi returned to the United States and enrolled in a premed program at The George Washington University, while spending much of his time networking with different groups in the local Muslim community. Al-Timimi was quoted as saying that he "flirted with each group, only quickly to become disinterested in their rhetoric and what I perceived as their being out of touch with the questions being raised in America—about Islam and the Muslims."

== Intellectual influences ==
Stating that he was "hungry for answers to the larger philosophical questions," Al-Timimi returned to Saudi Arabia in 1987, where he studied for a year at the Islamic University of Madinah and became a student of Abdul-Aziz bin Baz. Michael Sells who has investigated Al-Timimi's belief system has written, "It is Bin Baz’s understanding of Islam, in fact, that ... guides central assumptions within Timimi’s speeches." He also stated, "Were we to name the militant interpretation ... found in Timimi’s speech, then, we might call it Bin Bazism."

Al-Timimi also became influenced by Islamist thinkers like Sayyid Qutb, Abd al-Rahman Abd al-Khaliq, Safar Al-Hawali and Muhammad Surur. Following his April 2005 conviction, an editorial about Al-Timimi's life appeared in the Saudi newspaper Al Madina. It described his "personality as one that combines eloquence, steadfastness in times of adversity, and unique opinions from one angle, with gentleness and a good community spirit from another angle. I was very impressed with this unique mix that made me see him as being similar to the martyr Sayyid Qutb."

At his parents' urging, Al-Timimi returned to the United States after a year of study and earned a second undergraduate degree in computer science from the University of Maryland. He later earned a Ph.D. in computational biology from George Mason University in 2004, after defending his doctoral thesis titled "Chaos and Complexity in Cancer." His doctoral thesis reflected, in large part, the influence of the ideas of Harold Morowitz, one of his professors, on his thinking.

An FBI assessment of Al-Timimi noted that "[d]espite (Al-Timimi's) early attachment to [Bin Baz], he was open to rational methods (bin Baz famously insisted the world was flat in a 1976 fatwa) and continued his pursuit of science, eventually defending his PhD dissertation at George Mason University in Virginia in computational biology."

== Scientific publications ==
Domeniconi, C, Barbará, D, Chaudhary, H, Al-Timimi, A., and Jamison, D.C “Data Mining Techniques for Microarray Data Analysis,” in New Generation of Data Mining Applications, eds. Kantardzic, M. and Zurada, J. (March 2005)

Grant GM et al. (April 2004) “Microarrays in Cancer Research,” Anticancer Research, Mar-Apr;24(2A):441-8.

Al-Timimi, A., and Jamison, D.C (April 2004) “Knowledge Discovery in a Microarray Data Warehouse,” International Conference on Information Technology, IEEE, Las Vegas, NV.

== Employment ==
As an IT specialist, Al-Timimi worked at an IT company named Xpedior, Inc. Clients he provided service to included America Online (AOL). He reportedly worked for two months for Andrew Card, while he was Secretary of Transportation under George H. W. Bush (1992–93).

As a scientific researcher, Al-Timimi worked for the United States Navy and at George Mason University where he held the rank of Assistant Professor.

== Islamic activities ==
After returning from Medina, Al-Timimi began to deliver lectures on Salafiyya at Islamic conferences throughout the 1990s, and gradually developed an audience. Dozens of his lectures have been published on the internet. Viorst writes that Al-Timimi avoided contemporaneous political issues, but instead reflected on "the Islamic vision of Judgment Day, prophecy, the nature of the divine, and fiqh (Islamic jurisprudence)—subjects with which he grappled in Medina and in his private reading."

In the late 1990s, he cofounded an Islamic center in Falls Church, Virginia with his mentor, the Sudanese Islamic scholar Jaafar Sheikh Idris, which they named Dar al-Arqam. Al-Timimi became its primary lecturer, and delivered weekly lessons on Salafiyya to approximately a hundred attendees a week. According to Umar Lee, Al-Timimi's lectures "became 'the place to be' for the youth of the masjids [mosques] throughout the D.C. area," who were attracted to the fact that "this was a man who was born and raised in America, spoke in clear English, and not only had a great knowledge of the dīn (religion) but was college educated, a cancer researcher, and a very serious intellectual. This was a man who could take the knowledge of the Salaf and make it applicable to your everyday life and could speak in a language we all understood."

In 1995, Al-Timimi led a five-person delegation from the Islamic Assembly of North America to the United Nations 4th World Conference on Women, held in Beijing, China. Al-Timimi also translated into English a book about women in Islam that was written by Abdel Rahman Abdel Khaliq.

Al-Timimi has been characterized as "arguably the first American born activist Salafi preacher."

== Awlaki visit ==
In October 2002, the former Dar al-Hijrah imam Anwar al-Awlaki visited Al-Timimi and inquired about recruiting men for "violent jihad." But Al-Timimi became suspicious of al-Awlaki's motives, believing it to be an entrapment attempt and asked al-Awlaki to leave. In a Tweet on August 18, 2020, CBS national security correspondent, Catherine Herridge argued that the entire case was motivated by the Awlaki visit to Al-Timimi's home.

== Trial and sentencing ==
Prior to Al-Timimi's prosecution, a group of young Muslim men that prosecutors described as a "Virginia Jihad Network" were convicted on charges related to their travels to a militant training camp in Pakistan called Lashkar-e-Taiba, a group that the United States would later designate as a Foreign Terrorist Organization on December 26, 2001. Al-Timimi was named as an unindicted co-conspirator in that case. According to prosecutors, Al-Timimi told his followers at a private gathering on September 16, 2001, that he believed that the 9/11 attacks had been an omen that foreshadowed a looming end-of-times battle between Muslims and the West, and that "the time had come for them to go abroad and join the mujaheddin engaged in violent jihad in Afghanistan." Another attendee at the gathering, Randall Royer, advised the men that they could receive military training from Lashkar-e-Taiba, and put the men in contact with the group. Several of the attendees went on to travel to Lashkar-e-Taiba and participate in military training exercises, though none ultimately did any fighting. FBI Special Agent Tim Ervin described the Virginia Jihad prosecution before the 9/11 Commission as follows: "The Lackawanna 6 was a good case. The other prosecutions for terrorism are B.S. They would never have investigated the Virginia jihad group before 9/11".

After the conclusion of the Virginia Jihad Network trials, prosecutors tried Al-Timimi for helping to inspire their travel to Lashkar-e-Taiba. The case was tried before U.S. District Judge Leonie M. Brinkema in the Eastern District of Virginia, and charged Al-Timimi with 10 criminal counts, including solicitation of treason and attempting to aid the Taliban. Al-Timimi's defense lawyers argued his case was an attack on the freedom of speech and religious freedom, arguing that their client only told young Muslims that it might be better to emigrate from the United States to better practice their faith.

After a week of deliberation, the jury found Al-Timimi guilty of all 10 counts in April 2005. At a sentencing hearing on July 14, 2005, he received a mandatory lifetime prison sentence. Judge Brinkema described the sentence as "very draconian," but said "I don't think any well-read person can doubt the truth that terrorist camps are a crucial part of the new terrorism that is perpetrated in the world today. People of good will need to do whatever they can to stop that."United States v. Al-Timimi, 1:04-cr-00385 - CourtListener.com

At sentencing, Al-Timimi "made an eloquent statement to the court, quoting from the Constitution and Socrates. [He] pointed out that he had 'never owned or used a gun, never traveled to a military camp, never set foot in a country in which a war was taking place, never raised money for any violent organization.' For his conviction to stand, he said: '[T]wo hundred and thirty years of America's tradition of protecting the individual from the tyrannies and whims of the sovereign will have come to an end. And that which is exploited today to persecute a single member of a minority will most assuredly come back to haunt the majority tomorrow.'"

Royer was released from prison in December 2016, and now works for a nonprofit group that seeks to undermine religious extremism. Since his release, Royer has maintained that "Timimi did not specifically say join the Taliban or help al-Qaeda though he seemed to imply it." However, Royer has also said that Al-Timimi's statement that Muslim men should "go be with the mujahideen" was "colossally bad advice."

== Appeals ==
In late 2005, Al-Timimi's appellate attorneys sought discovery on whether Al-Timimi had been subjected to illegal wiretaps in light of the then-recently disclosed NSA warrantless surveillance program. The U.S. Court of Appeals for the Fourth Circuit responded by remanding the case back to the district court, giving broad latitude to the trial judge. The Justice Department did not confirm or deny the use of NSA wiretaps against Al-Timimi.

In 2006, Al-Timimi's attorneys also challenged his treatment by the Federal Bureau of Prisons, claiming that it had repeatedly moved him to new facilities to block him from meeting with his legal counsel. Attorney Jonathan Turley told NPR that Al-Timimi "was transferred to at least six different prisons in four states in less than six months. It became a version of Where's Waldo. We could not find him." After an internal investigation, BOP found that a prison official had "verbally harassed" Al-Timimi, but concluded that it had insufficient evidence to substantiate Al-Timimi's other claims.

In September 2015, the Fourth Circuit again remanded the case, this time on the grounds that "the FBI withheld evidence of its 2002 investigation into the first American on the CIA's kill or capture list, Anwar al-Awlaki".

Between 2016 and 2019, Al-Timimi's attorneys further argued that several of his convictions have been rendered invalid by the Supreme Court's intervening decisions in Johnson v. United States and United States v. Davis.

On April 27, 2020, Al-Timimi's attorneys filed a motion for his conditional release from prison pending the remainder of his appeal, arguing that intervening Supreme Court authority had cast doubt on the charges that continued to subject him to imprisonment, and that the COVID-19 pandemic additionally presented an exceptional reason justifying his release.

On August 18, 2020, Judge Brinkema granted the motion and ordered Al-Timimi's conditional release from ADX and into home confinement while he pursues his appeal. On September 1, 2020, Al-Timimi was released from ADX Florence and placed into home confinement.

On July 18, 2024, Judge Brinkema overturned three of the 10 counts on which he was convicted, including his life sentence. "But she upheld other counts that could leave him with decades of prison time beyond the 15 years he already served ... She also rejected allegations that prosecutors failed to disclose information that the government sought to use Anwar al-Awlaki ... as an informant, and that al-Awlaki tried unsuccessfully to lure Al-Timimi into illegal conduct as part of a government sting."

On August 1, 2025, Al-Timimi's direct appeal was filed in the Fourth Circuit after twenty years in the district court.

On January 9, 2026, the 4th Circuit Court of Appeals unanimously voted to overturn Al-Timimi's remaining convictions, finding that his statements were protected by the First Amendment. In the ruling, Circuit Judge James Andrew Wynn stated, "Ali al-Timimi was convicted based entirely on words he spoke in the immediate aftermath of the Sept. 11, 2001, attacks -- words that were inflammatory, disturbing and deeply offensive, but that urged no concrete criminal plan and did not provide operational assistance for the commission of any particular offense".

== Judgment of Acquittal ==
On March 3, 2026, Judge Brinkema "ORDERED and ADJUDGED that the defendant, Ali Al-Timimi, is fully acquitted, discharged, and any bond exonerated as to ALL COUNTS as charged in the Superseding Indictment (Dkt 47)."

== Legal commentary ==
The Al-Timimi case has generated some legal commentary, including:

Davis, T. (2006). "The Suffocation of Free Speech Due to the Gravity of Danger of Terrorism". Modern American. 2 (3): 3–9.

Freivogel, W. H. (2007). "Tom Eagleton and 'the Curse to our Constitution'". St. Louis University Law Journal. 52 (1): 109–136.

Goldberger, D. (2005). "Protecting Speech We Hate". Litigation, 32(2), 40–44.

Healy, T. (2008). "Brandenburg in a Time of Terror". Notre Dame Law Review. 84 (2): 655–732.

McCormack, W. (2005). "Inchoate Terrorism: Liberalism Clashes with Fundamentalism". Georgetown Journal of International Law, 37(1), 1–60.

Tanenbaum, R. S. (2005). "Preaching Terror: Free Speech or Wartime Incitement?". American University Law Review. 55 (3): 785–820.

Tehranian, J. (2007). "Compulsory Whiteness: Towards a Middle Eastern Legal Scholarship". Indiana Law Journal. 82 (1): 1–48.
