= Virginia jihad network =

Group of potential Islamist terrorists

The Virginia jihad network was a group network of Islamist jihadist young men centered in Northern Virginia that were accused of conspiring to train and participate in violence overseas against US forces in Afghanistan and Indian forces in Kashmir. The men, Muhammed Aatique, Hammad Abdur-Raheem, Ibrahim Ahmed Al-Hamdi, Seifullah Chapman, Khwaja Hasan, Masoud Khan, Yong Kwon, Randall Todd Royer and Donald Surratt, were found guilty of various terrorism-related offences.

== Convictions ==
Ali al-Timimi was found guilty of exhorting his followers to join the Taliban and fight US troops.

Ali Asad Chandia was a teacher at a school in Maryland and was accused of providing material support to Lashkar-e-Taiba, a U.S.-designated Pakistani terrorist organization. Chandia was sentenced to 15 years in prison, with three years of supervised release at the end of his incarceration

Randall Todd Royer pleaded guilty to two counts of aiding and abetting the use and discharge of a firearm and carrying of an explosion in relation to a crime and during the commission of a felony. These counts stemmed from assisting other young men to gain entry to the Lashkar-e-Taiba training camp in Pakistan. Three other individuals attending that meeting, Yong Kwon, Muhammed Aatique, and Khwaja Hasan—all of whom pleaded guilty—stated that they went to the Lashkar-e-Taiba camp to obtain combat training for the purpose engaging in violent jihad in Afghanistan against the American troops that they expected would soon invade that country. Al-Hamdi also admitted to carrying a rocket-propelled grenade in furtherance of a conspiracy to undertake a military operation against India.

Seifullah Chapman maintained his intention to travel to the training camp was for a grueling physical challenge, not to seek out fighting in a holy war. Masoud Khan, Seifullah Chapman and Hammad Abdur-Raheem all were convicted of conspiring to provide material support to Lashkar-e-Taiba, a designated Foreign Terrorist Organization, and to attack India in violation of the Neutrality Act of 1794, as well as of various firearms related offenses, for conduct that spanned from 2000 to 2003. U.S. District Judge Leonie Brinkema considered the sentences "draconian" and suggested preferring to imposing a lesser sentence for some of the convicted men.

== Aftermath ==
A 2011 NPR report claimed some of the people associated with this group were imprisoned in a highly restrictive Communication Management Unit. A federal judge in Virginia ordered Seifullah Chapman, one of the convicted men from the case serving a 65-year sentence, to be released from prison in July 2018. The decision stemmed from a recent Supreme Court case that overturned a law that was found to be unconstitutionally vague in the way it described a crime. Chapman argued his initial conviction of violating a law was vague in the way it described "a crime of violence". A month later, the same judge vacated the convictions of Masoud Khan, a second man from the case serving a life-sentence, based on the same argument made by Chapman. On January 13, 2009, Yong Ki Kwon testified by video link in the Sydney trial of five men accused of planning a terrorist attack in Australia.

Randall Todd Royer, also known as Ismail Royer, is now the Director of the Islam and Religious Freedom Action Team for the Religious Freedom Institute. He was included as a lay leader on the United States' Advisory Board of the Religious Liberty Commission on 16 May 2025.

On January 9, 2026, the 4th Circuit Court of Appeals threw out all remaining convictions of Dr. Ali al-Timimi citing First Amendment protections.

== See also ==
- Ali al-Timimi
- First Amendment
