= Dar Al-Hijrah =

Mosque in Northern Virginia, U.S.

Dar Al-Hijrah Islamic Center
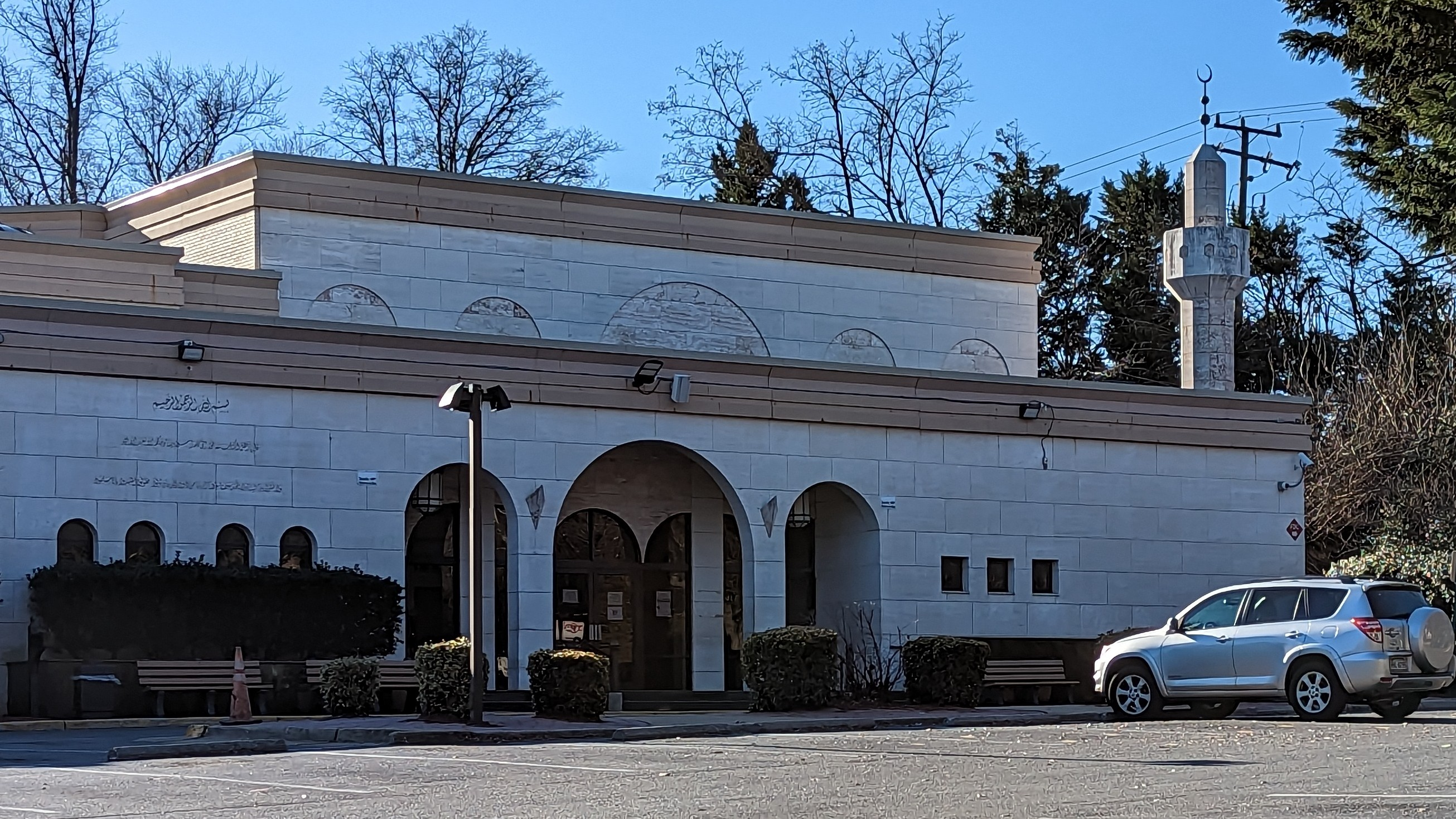

Religion
- Affiliation: Islam
- Ecclesiastical or organisational status: Mosque
- Leadership: Imam Farhan Siddiqi
- Status: Active

Location
- Location: Seven Corners, Virginia, U.S.
- Interactive map of Dar Al-Hijrah Islamic Center
- Coordinates: 38.8614°N 77.1466°W

Architecture
- Type: Mosque
- Style: Islamic
- Completed: 1991
- Construction cost: $5 million

Specifications
- Capacity: 5,000 (inside)
- Minaret: 1

Website
- hijrah.org

Dar Al-Hijrah Islamic Center (Arabic: مركز دار الهجرة الاسلامي) is a mosque in Northern Virginia. It is located in the Seven Corners area of unincorporated Fairfax County, Virginia, in the Washington, D.C., metropolitan area.

== History ==
Dar Al-Hijrah was founded in 1983 by a group of university students, mostly of Arab origin, who had broken away from the Islamic Center of Washington. It was one of the first mosques to be established in Northern Virginia, near Washington, D.C. It is also one of the area's largest and most influential mosques.

A small group of families, with help of the North American Islamic Trust (NAIT), purchased the mosque's grounds on June 19, 1983. The mosque was first established in a house that is still on the center's campus, and now serves as a food bank. Approximately 30 congregants would attend the weekly jumu'ah (Friday prayer) during the mosque's early years. The current building, on a 3.4 acre plot, was finished for $5 million in 1991 ($11,818,959 today) with financial help from the Saudi Embassy's Islamic Affairs Department.

In 1993, some area residents attempted to force closure of the mosque, saying it violated Fairfax County zoning ordinances. Worshipers believed the attempt was fueled by anti-Islamic bigotry. However, despite the mosque's humble beginnings and early challenges, Dar Al-Hijrah grew to become a powerhouse mosque by 2000, serving the thriving and diverse Muslim community outside Washington, D.C.

The FBI Director of Counter-Intelligence for the Middle East, Gordon M. Snow, was a frequent, weekly attendee of the services in spring and summer 2001, while also completing his master's degree 3 miles away.

The mosque has been associated with the Muslim American Society, a non-profit that advocates for Islam in the U.S., since 1999. The Muslim American Society has been linked to the Muslim Brotherhood by way of its founders. Some members of the congregation disagreed with the close association between the MAS and the mosque, and the lack of inclusiveness in the congregation. In 2004, Omeish called for greater inclusion of young people and women in the congregation. He said that the board had been examining proposals to reduce its close ties to the MAS and increase diversity on the board.

== Activities ==
The mosque holds prayers five times daily, and Friday prayer attendance exceeds 3,000 people. In September 2004, about sixty percent of its membership was Arab, with an increasing percentage coming from countries such as Somalia, Morocco, Pakistan, Ethiopia, and Bangladesh.

Activities in addition to prayers include lectures, conferences, youth recreation and outdoor activities (such as camping and field trips) through its Youth Center, women's classes, health fairs, and financial assistance. It also operates an Islamic School called the "Washington Islamic Academy in Northern Virginia". In addition, Dar Al-Hijrah co-sponsors an annual civic picnic, along with other Northern Virginia organizations, at which candidates for local office meet Muslim voters. Dar Al-Hijrah is open for group tours.

== Leadership ==
Jamal al Barzinji and Samir Salah both were among Dar Al-Hijrah's original founding members. Al Barzinji was listed as Dar Al-Hijrah's original trustee while Salah would later become the mosque's president (as of 2008). Mohammed Ali Al-Hanooti, a Palestinian imam that had previously served at mosques in New Jersey, was Dar Al-Hijrah's imam from 1995 to 1999. Dar al-Hijrah's previous imams at that point did not speak English and lacked engagement with the youth. With Al-Hanooti's departure, mosque leaders specifically sought out to hire an imam that could attract young people and non-Arabic speakers.

Brooklyn-born convert-to-Islam Imam Johari Abdul-Malik was previously the Director of Outreach for Dar Al-Hijrah from June 2002 until June 2017. Speaking on his role at the mosque, he said, "It's important that there's an American at the mosque to speak with media, to defend Islam, who can talk about the rights of Muslims. It would be difficult for us if we had an imam who didn't understand the process here." During his tenure at Dar Al-Hijrah, Abdul-Malik commented on criminal cases against several American Muslims, including that of one Dar Al-Hijrah congregant. Ahmed Omar Abu Ali, who had worshipped and taught at Dar Al-Hijrah, was charged in 2005 by U.S. prosecutors with plotting with members of al-Qaeda to assassinate President George W. Bush. Abdul-Malik accused the government of singling him out to stir anti-Muslim sentiment.

Sheikh Mohammed Adam El-Sheikh, formerly a Muslim Brotherhood member in Sudan, and one of the founders of both the mosque and the Muslim American Society (MAS), was the mosque's imam between August 2003 and May 2005. He left the mosque to become the executive director of the Fiqh Council of North America, an association of Islamic legal scholars.

Shaker Elsayed, a Shariah law scholar born in Cairo, Egypt, has been the resident imam at Dar Al-Hijrah since June 1, 2005. From 2000 through 2005 he was the Secretary General of the Muslim American Society. He unequivocally condemns terrorism and states that the mosque actively publicizes that condemnation to the public.

== Board of directors and executive committee ==
The mosque's nine-member board of directors consists of the secretary general of the Islamic Society of North America (ISNA), the president of the Muslim Arab Youth Association (MAYA), the general manager of the North American Islamic Trust (NAIT), the president of Muslim American Society (MAS), the president of the Dar Al-Hijrah Executive Committee, and four other members. Directors serve for five-year terms, and new directors are elected by the currently serving directors. Abelhaleem Hasan Abdelraziq Ashqar, a Palestinian later convicted of criminal contempt and obstruction of justice for refusal to testify in a trial related to the funding of Hamas in the US, was a member of the executive committee.

Dar Al-Hijrah has a seven-member executive committee; every two years four committee members are appointed by the mosque's board of directors, while the other three are elected by its membership. Imams Shaker Elsayed and Johari Abdul-Malik serve on the executive committee. Esam Omeish, former president of the MAS, is a member of the board.

== Outreach ==
Dar Al-Hijrah is active in community outreach and service, and promoting mutual understanding in the local area. It participates in community food banks, back-to-school supply, community clean-up efforts, is engaged in interfaith projects, and participates in civil rights work. Its social services department provides food, clothing, and other household items to needy local families of all faiths.

During the Islamic month of Ramadan, Dar Al-Hijrah free meals nightly to all, regardless of faith; over 800 meals each night. These include a weekly Iftar for Muslims incarcerated in nearby prisons. Also during Ramadan, the center sponsors interfaith and civic iftar dinners for local officials from the police force, fire department, and emergency medical services as well as various faith groups to promote mutual understanding. It also distributes tens of thousands of dollars in zakat every Ramadan.

== Controversy ==
Several sources indicated that Nidal Hasan, the perpetrator of the November 5, 2009 Fort Hood shooting, attended the Dar Al-Hijrah mosque at the same time in 2001 as Nawaf al-Hazmi and Hani Hanjour (two of the September 11 hijackers). Al-Hazmi and Hanjour had attended the mosque for several weeks during 2001 when Anwar al-Awlaki was imam there; a law enforcement official said that the FBI would look into whether Hasan associated with the hijackers. The mosque issued a statement condemning the Fort Hood shootings, and al-Awlaki's praise of them. In addition, the phone number for the mosque was found in the apartment of one a planner of the September 11 attacks, Ramzi bin al-Shibh in Hamburg, northern Germany. Ahmed Omar Abu Ali, who was convicted of providing material support to al Qaeda and conspiracy to assassinate President George W. Bush, worshiped and taught Islamic studies at the mosque around that time, where he was also a camp counselor.

Abelhaleem Hasan Abdelraziq Ashqar, a member of the mosque's executive committee, was convicted in November 2007 of contempt and obstruction of justice for refusal to testify before a grand jury with regard to Hamas, and sentenced to 135 months in prison.

The mosque is known for being politically militant. Jeffrey Goldberg, in his 2008 book Prisoners: A Story of Friendship and Terror, characterizes Dar Al-Hijrah as an openly political mosque that has conducted militant Friday sermons, especially prior to the September 11 attacks. The Washington Post has called its leaders "outspoken in criticizing U.S. law enforcement actions against Muslims and U.S. policies in the Middle East."

In May 2017, Shaker Elsayed, the head imam of the center, said in a video that he recommended removing a young girl's labia and clitoris, a procedure known as female circumcision or female genital mutilation (FGM). The comments were brought to light by a tweet by the Middle East Media Research Institute in June, which links to the video, originally posted on the mosque's YouTube channel. The mosque issued a statement condemning Shaker Elsayed's remarks and stating that FGM is "prohibited in Islam as well as the laws of the land."

=== Anwar al-Awlaki ===
Anwar al-Awlaki was Imam at the mosque between January 2001 and April 2002. He was popular with young people and was able to connect with the Muslim community of Northern Virginia. Al-Awlaki was considered a moderate during his time at Dar Al-Hijrah, including publicly condemning the September 11 attacks and Al-Qaeda. He was invited to speak at the United States Department of Defense and became the first imam to conduct a prayer service for the Congressional Muslim Staffer Association at the U.S. Capitol.

He has since been accused of being a senior al-Qaeda recruiter linked to various terrorists, including three 9/11 hijackers, the accused Fort Hood shooter, and the accused Christmas Day 2009 bomber. Six days after the September 11 attacks, he wrote on IslamOnline suggesting that Israeli intelligence agents might have been responsible for the attacks, and that the FBI "went into the roster of the airplanes and whoever has a Muslim or Arab name became the hijacker by default." In 2003 House Intelligence Committee member Representative Anna Eshoo (D-CA) described him as "more than a coincidental figure" in the attacks. According to the Washington Post, board member Esam Omeish was involved in hiring al-Awlaki . Omeish said in 2004 that he was convinced that al-Awlaki "has no inclination or active involvement in any events or circumstances that have to do with terrorism."

Al-Awlaki resigned from Dar Al-Hijrah in early 2002 due to post-9/11 media attention that distracted the imam from his duties, according to the mosque's outreach director.

== See also ==
- List of mosques in the Americas
- Lists of mosques
- List of mosques in the United States
