= Ahmed Omar Abu Ali =

American Sunni Muslim

- Born: March 1981 (age 45); Houston, Texas
- Occupation: Student
- Status: Incarcerated at Terre Haute FCI
- Convictions: Guilty on all counts (November 22, 2005)
- Criminal charges: Two counts of providing material support to terrorists, two counts of providing material support to a terrorist organization (Al-Qaeda), one count of contributing goods and services to Al-Qaeda, one count of receiving services from Al-Qaeda, and charges of conspiracy to assassinate the president of the United States, conspiracy to hijack aircraft, and conspiracy to destroy aircraft.
- Penalty: Life sentence (on appeal)

Ahmed Omar Abu Ali (Arabic: احمد عمر أبو علي; born March 1981) is an American who was convicted of providing material support to the al-Qaeda terrorist network and conspiracy to assassinate United States President George W. Bush. His case has been the subject of criticism due to the federal government admitting evidence from alleged torture during Ali's extraordinary rendition.

== Background ==
Born in Houston, Texas, in March 1981 and raised in Falls Church, Virginia, Abu Ali was valedictorian of his class at the Islamic Saudi Academy high school in nearby Alexandria. Abu Ali entered the University of Maryland in the fall of 1999 as an electrical engineering major, prayed at the Dar al-Hijrah mosque near Falls Church, but withdrew in the middle of the 2000 spring semester to study Islamic theology at the Islamic University of Medina in Medina, Saudi Arabia.

== Arrest and detention in Saudi Arabia ==
In June 2003, Abu Ali was arrested by Saudi authorities while taking exams at the Islamic University of Medina. He was held for approximately 20 months by the Saudi government without charges or access to an attorney, and given the paucity of information coming out of Saudi Arabia about the case, many human rights organizations speculated that Abu Ali's situation was actually a case of extraordinary rendition and that he might be subject to torture. In addition, comments allegedly made by Gordon Kromberg, a federal prosecutor in the Eastern District of Virginia, heightened the concerns that Abu Ali had faced torture during his detention and interrogation in Saudi Arabia. In 2003, Kromberg was asked by a defense lawyer whether Abu Ali would be brought to the United States to face charges. Kromberg responded: "He's no good for us here. He has no fingernails left," according to an affidavit filed in court by the lawyer, Salim Ali.

In response to the detention by the Saudi government, Abu Ali's family, represented by Morton Sklar and the World Organization for Human Rights, filed a civil action against the U.S. government in the United States District Court for the District of Columbia. In the suit, they asked the court to issue a writ of habeas corpus to force the United States government to take action to get Abu Ali returned to the US. The government challenged the case, claiming that the court did not have jurisdiction either to interfere with US foreign policy (an executive function), or to force the Saudi government to release Abu Ali. Judge John D. Bates issued an order requiring partial discovery to determine if the court did, in fact, have jurisdiction.

== US criminal trial ==
The District Court in DC never got a chance to rule on the issue of jurisdiction. In February 2005, Abu Ali was transferred to US custody pursuant to a criminal indictment, returned by a grand jury in the Eastern District of Virginia on February 3, 2005. The indictment charged Abu Ali with two counts of providing material support to terrorists, two counts of providing material support to a terrorist organization (Al-Qaeda), one count of contributing goods and services to Al-Qaeda, and one count of receiving services from Al-Qaeda.

The indictment was later amended to add charges of conspiracy to assassinate the President of the United States, conspiracy to hijack aircraft, and conspiracy to destroy aircraft. The indictment alleged that Abu Ali had joined a terrorist cell in Medina, led by senior al-Qaeda members Ali Al-Faqasi and Zubayr Al-Rimi, and that among the plots they were developing were a plan to assassinate the President of the United States, and a plan to mount 9/11-style attacks using planes transiting through the US. The criminal case was prosecuted by Assistant U.S. Attorneys David H. Laufman and Stephen M. Campbell and U.S. Justice Department Trial Attorney Jerry R. DeMaio.

=== Pretrial hearings ===
Abu Ali went to trial in the fall of 2005. The government's evidence was focused on a detailed confession Abu Ali had made while in Saudi custody. Abu Ali challenged the admissibility of the confession, claiming: (1) the confession was involuntary due to alleged torture he had suffered at the hands of the Saudis; and (2) he should have been given certain constitutional protections (including Miranda warnings), because the interrogations were a joint venture between the FBI and Saudi authorities, rather than a purely Saudi interrogation, which would not have been subject to the same scrutiny under the U.S. Constitution.

After an extended pre-trial suppression hearing, in which Abu Ali himself testified, Judge Gerald Bruce Lee, who presided over the case, ruled that Abu Ali's confession to Saudi agents was admissible.

=== Abu Ali’s testimony regarding his torture ===
Abu Ali testified that on the first day, his interrogators asked him whether he knew specific people and whether he knew about bombings in Riyadh. At one point, his blindfold was taken off. Abu Ali said he then saw the bruised face of a man through a window in the door to the room. The man was asked if he knew Abu Ali, and he shook his head no, then was taken away. Abu Ali was not fed this day. The Saudis hit him, slapped him, punched him in the stomach, and pulled his beard, ears, and hair. He was not allowed to use the bathroom, even when Abu Ali asked to wash up for prayers. The next day, the Saudis continued hitting him. At one point, he was taken from the chair in which he was sitting, and his handcuffs were handcuffed to a chain or other handcuffs in the floor, leaving him with his knees to his chest on the ground, hunched over with his head on his fists, and his feet shackled. Then someone began to strike him on the back and to yell, “confess!” He does not know what he was hit with, or how many times. Although he was blindfolded, Abu Ali said he could hear four different voices in the room, and that he thinks he was assaulted by only one person. Abu Ali said it was “very painful” and that it was the “first time I felt extreme pain.” While he was being hit on the back, people in the room kept telling him to “confess.” When the beating began, he was clad in an undershirt and long underpants. At one point, his undershirt was torn off and he was struck on his bare back. Eventually, Abu Ali told them he would cooperate. The beating stopped, and he was taken back to his cell.

=== Marks on Abu Ali’s back ===
There were several marks on Abu Ali's back which the defense presented as physical evidence that Abu Ali had been tortured. The prosecution claimed that these marks were not the result of torture but merely “pigment discolorations.”

The defense expert was Dr. Allen Keller, the director of the Bellevue/NYU Program for Survivors of Torture. Dr. Keller physically examined Abu Ali and said that he observed about seven to ten scars on Abu Ali's back which evince scars from the whipping Mr. Abu Ali claims he suffered during interrogation in Medina.

The government expert was Dr. Robert Katz, a dermatologist. He did not physically examine Abu Ali but viewed photographs that the court had taken. Dr. Katz stated that, in his opinion, the marks depicted on Abu Ali's back in the photograph were not scars, but “pigment discolorations.”

The judge sided with the prosecution.

=== Jury trial and appeal ===
The jury trial took place in November 2005. On November 22, 2005, after deliberating for two and a half days, the jury returned a unanimous guilty verdict on all counts. On March 29, 2006, Ali was sentenced to 30 years in prison for his crime. While prosecutors had pushed for a life sentence, Judge Gerald Bruce Lee explained that the (relatively) light sentence was handed down because Abu Ali's actions "did not result in one single actual victim. That fact must be taken into account."

On appeal, the United States Court of Appeals for the Fourth Circuit upheld the conviction but overturned the sentence on the grounds that the prior Court had deviated from federal sentencing guidelines which call for life in prison. Judge Lee resentenced Ali to life in prison.

Mr. Ali was held under highly restrictive conditions in ADX Florence supermax prison. In August 2008, he requested permission to receive two books by Barack Obama, Dreams from My Father and The Audacity of Hope. Permission was denied by prison authorities on the grounds that the books contained material "potentially detrimental to national security".

=== Criticism of trial by Amnesty International ===
Amnesty International has called Abu-Ali's trial unfair based on their observations in the period from November 7 to 10, 2005. They conclude that:

Amnesty International is seriously concerned that the trial of Ahmed Abu Ali may set a precedent in US courts of according unqualified support to the declarations of a foreign government regarding its human rights record as a means of rendering evidence admissible, including statements obtained by torture and ill-treatment. In this case, the statements of officials from Saudi Arabia, a state with a clear record of widespread torture and ill-treatment, flatly denying that such practices existed appear to have been taken at face value with no serious attempts allowed to challenge the claims presented

== See also ==
- Silent witness rule
