= Muslim American Society =

Nonprofit organization based in Washington, D.C.

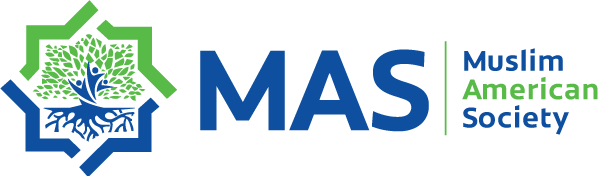
- Abbreviation: MAS
- Formation: 1993; 33 years ago
- Type: Nonprofit
- Legal status: 501(c)(3) organization
- Headquarters: Washington, DC
- Location: United States
- Executive Director: Ayman Hammous
- Affiliations: Dar Al-Hijrah
- Website: muslimamericansociety.org

The Muslim American Society (MAS) is a nonprofit organization founded in 1993 and headquartered in Washington, D.C. MAS describes itself as a grassroots Islamic movement. It has more than 50 chapters across the United States.

== History ==
Muslim American Society (MAS) was founded by a small group of American Muslims who wanted to have a Muslim organization in the United States that would allow them to "organize and integrate Muslims to be a contributing part of American society, to see themselves as Muslim Americans." According to its website, the society is a "charitable, religious, social, cultural, and educational organization" aiming for a virtuous and just American society. Its mission is to "move people and nurture lifelong, God-centered agents of change”.

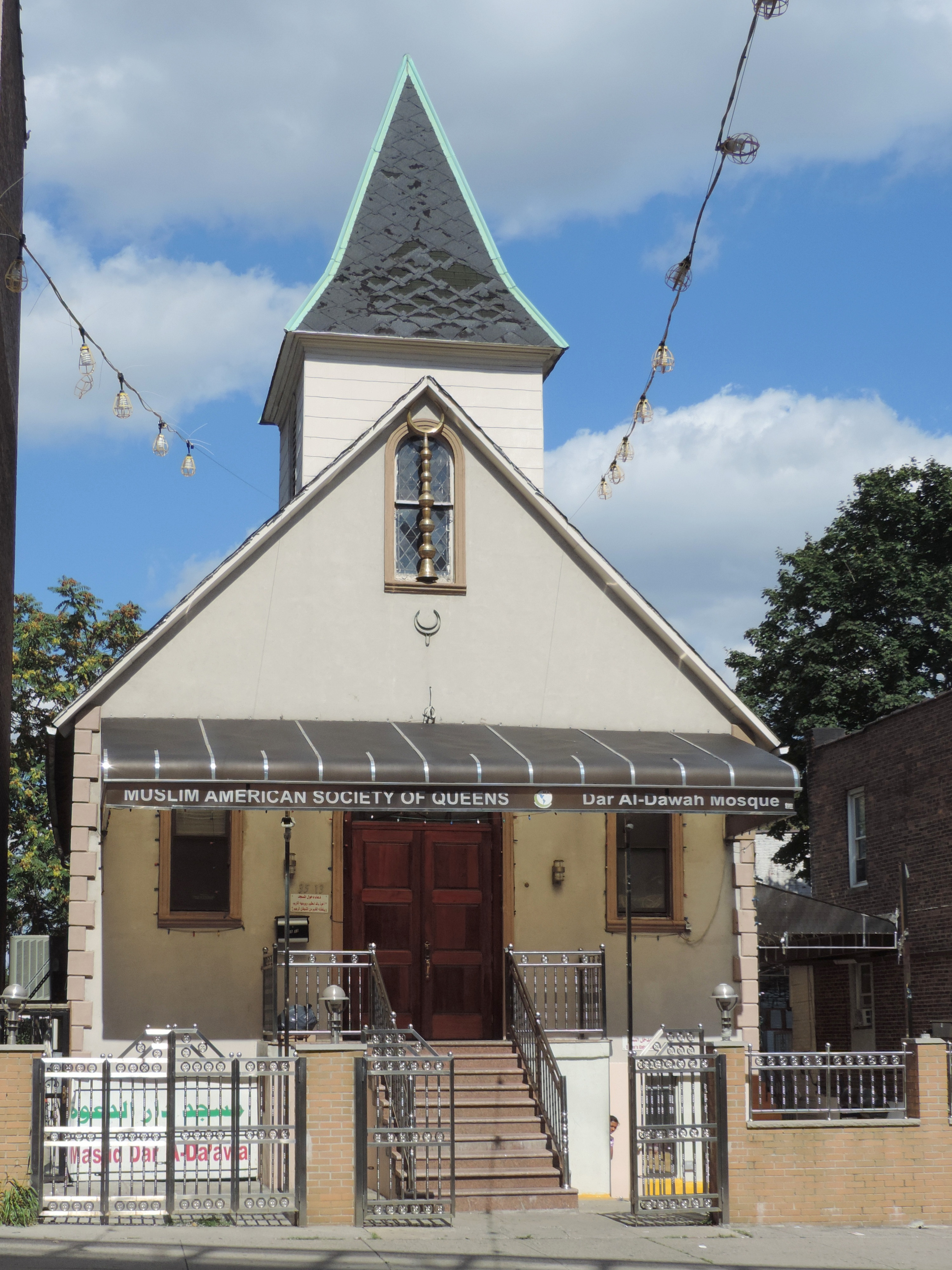
Muslim American Society of Queens

MAS was incorporated in Illinois in 1993 and established its headquarters in Washington, DC, in 1998. Founding members of the organization were involved in the Muslim Brotherhood, an organization started in Egypt in 1928. The Muslim American Society acknowledges its early connection to the Muslim Brotherhood, including on its website, but says that it has moved "beyond that point of conception" and "has no connection with the Brotherhood and disagrees with the international organization on many issues".

In 1999, the organization began publishing a bimonthly English-language magazine, The American Muslim. The following year, the MAS Youth Center opened in Brooklyn, and MAS helped start the Islamic American University, based out of Southfield, Michigan, and Kansas City, Missouri, as a distant-learning program for classical Islamic studies. In response to anti-Muslim hate following the September 11 attacks, MAS organized events such as Muslim American Heritage Day in Washington, D.C., where 150 Muslims gathered on October 5, 2002, to pray together on Freedom Plaza. The Muslim American Society Freedom Foundation, a public policy division led by Mahdi Bray as executive director, also offered seminars on how to positively change the perception of Islam among Americans.

In 2002, the Muslim American Society held its first joint conference with the Islamic Circle of North America (ICNA). The MAS–ICNA conference has since been held annually in Chicago.

In November 2014, MAS was designated a terrorist organization by the United Arab Emirates, with 84 other organizations including the Muslim Brotherhood and its regional and local affiliates, and other regional and international groups. MAS, CAIR and similar European groups were listed due to their alleged Muslim Brotherhood ties. The U.S. State Department subsequently released a statement saying that the department "does not consider these organisations to be terrorist organisations". Muslim American Society stated that it had had "no dealings with the United Arab Emirates" and were "perplexed by this news".

MAS started the “Know your Muslim neighbor" program in January 2016 in response to growing anti-Islam sentiment. With the first event held in Metro Detroit, the program includes opportunities to learn about Muslim culture and traditions. Similar events were held in Cherry Hill, New Jersey, in 2018 and the Galveston Bay Area in 2019, following the Christchurch mosque shootings at a mosque in New Zealand and Easter bombing attacks on churches in Sri Lanka.

In 2019, the Middle East Media Research Institute published a video of children in a Philadelphia MAS center singing about the "blood of martyrs". Two young girls recited a resistance anthem popular among militants fighting for Arab and Palestinian liberation, with one saying of Israeli Jews: "We will chop off their heads, and we will liberate the sorrowful and exalted Al-Aqsa Mosque," to which the Israeli government controls all access. MAS released a statement disavowing the performance, describing the unvetted inclusion of violent slogans as an "unintended mistake" by an independent school renting the space, the slogans did not align with the MAS values, and confirming that the organizer responsible had been dismissed.

In September 2019, the Muslim American Society of Minnesota co-organized a protest along with the Council on American–Islamic Relations and Anti-War Committee to “condemn human rights abuses and security crackdowns under India's Hindu nationalist-led government". The protest was in response to Indian Prime Minister Narendra Modi's appearance with U.S. president Donald Trump at a rally in Houston. Following the murder of George Floyd, members of MAS of Minnesota participated in the protests calling for justice for the African American man who was killed by police.

During the 2020 U.S. elections, Ismahan Abdullahi, executive director of the Muslim American Society, said that the organization made 185,000 calls and texts to Arab and Muslim communities in eight states including Michigan. Abdullahi is also executive director of MAS PACE National, a policy advocacy division of MAS.

Asad Zaman, executive director of the MAS of Minnesota, said in August 2020 that the organization's food distribution program run at its three Minnesota mosques was up 500% due to the COVID-19 pandemic. In early April 2021, Zaman helped organize a COVID-19 vaccination campaign based out of 16 mosques in Minnesota which succeeded in vaccinating 7,000 people in the lead up to the month of Ramadan.
