= 2004 Osama bin Laden video =

Address by Osama bin Laden

Osama bin Laden in the video

On October 29, 2004, Al Jazeera broadcast a video statement of Osama bin Laden, then-leader of the militant organization al-Qaeda, to the people of the United States. This was the first time he unambiguously accepted responsibility for al-Qaeda's September 11 attacks against the U.S., which he had until then only spoken about vaguely or cryptically.

In the video, bin Laden describes his motive for 9/11, which included revenge against the U.S. on behalf of Muslims for supporting Israel in the 1982 Lebanon War, when Israel destroyed buildings in Muslim-majority Lebanon. Thus, he says, he destroyed the Twin Towers in New York City on 9/11. He also condemns U.S. president George W. Bush's response to 9/11, which included invasions of Afghanistan and Iraq, two Muslim-majority nations; Bin Laden threatens the U.S. to leave the Islamic world alone, lest another attack like 9/11 occur.

Amidst the international manhunt for bin Laden as he was hiding in Pakistan, the video demonstrated that he was still alive by mid-2004; he mentions U.S. senator John Kerry, who was the Democratic nominee for the presidential election on November 2.

== Background ==
In the Soviet–Afghan War (1979–1989), Muslim-majority Afghanistan was invaded by the mostly non-Muslim Soviet Union. Osama bin Laden, a Saudi Islamist connected to the royal House of Saud, left his country to organize foreign volunteers within the Afghan mujahideen, Muslims who fought the Soviets were jihadists; those who engage in jihad, struggle in the name of Islam, are called mujahideen. For that purpose, bin Laden and Abdullah Yusuf Azzam founded Maktab al-Khidamat (MaK) to properly oversee the Arab volunteers. In 1989, the Soviets withdrew from Afghanistan. Azzam was then assassinated, leaving Bin Laden with full control of MaK, which evolved into al-Qaeda.

In the terrorist attacks of September 11, 2001, nineteen members of al-Qaeda hijacked four American commercial flights in an attempt to crash them into important landmarks in the United States. American Airlines Flight 11 and United Airlines Flight 175 were crashed into the Twin Towers—1 and 2 World Trade Center (WTC)—in New York City. Both towers soon collapsed as a result of the damage. American Airlines Flight 77 crashed into the Pentagon near Washington D.C. United Airlines Flight 93 was likely targeted at the U.S. Capitol, but crashed in a field in Pennsylvania, when its hijackers fought with its other passengers and crew.

From 2001 to 2011, the U.S. engaged in a widespread manhunt for bin Laden, who had left Afghanistan for Pakistan, where he eventually built a safe house. He had narrowly escaped death from a U.S. assault in December 2001, during the Battle of Tora Bora in Afghanistan.

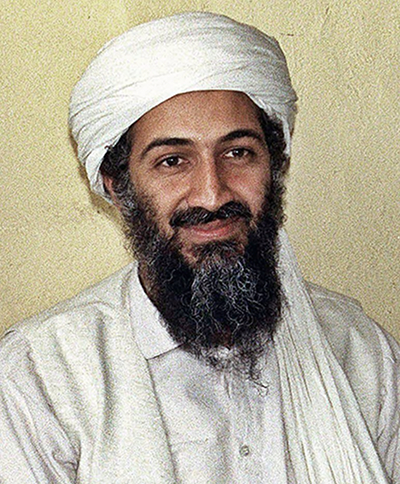
Bin Laden

=== Responsibility for 9/11 ===
On 9/11, U.S. and German intelligence intercepted communications that pointed to bin Laden's culpability in the attacks. Bush wrote in his diary before going to bed that day: "The Pearl Harbor of the 21st century took place today... We think it's Osama bin Laden." The FBI later stated that classified evidence linking al-Qaeda and bin Laden to 9/11 is clear and irrefutable.

In November 2001, during the U.S. invasion of Afghanistan, American troops found a videotape in which bin Laden is seen discussing what is likely 9/11 with Khaled al-Harbi. Bin Laden tells him, among other things, that it was "calculated in advance [what] the number of casualties from the enemy [would be] based on the position of the towers". The video was released on December 13. On December 26, Qatari news channel Al Jazeera—a private business partially funded by the Qatari government—broadcast a video statement from bin Laden, in which he again seems to imply responsibility for 9/11: "Our terrorism against the United States is worthy of praise to ..." He also mentions a recent "blessed attack" on the U.S. Many more vague and cryptic recordings of bin Laden were released afterwards.

== Video ==
On October 29, 2004, Al Jazeera broadcast a previously unseen video recorded by bin Laden. Reuters then made an English translation of it. On the tape, bin Laden gives a message to the American public, which includes his first unambiguous confirmation that he helped plan 9/11. It was the first publicized video statement of his in three years. Bin Laden moves both of his arms in it, which dispelled recent intelligence reports that one of them had been seriously injured in Afghanistan.

U.S. diplomats in Qatar were given a copy of the tape by the Qatari government before Al Jazeera aired it. The diplomats unsuccessfully sought to prevent the network from doing so. The U.S. said that the tape they received was 18 minutes long. The portion that Al Jazeera aired was 14 minutes and 39 seconds of it; the U.S. did not release and would not say what was in the rest of the video. The tape was analyzed by U.S. intelligence to determine if it contains any coded messages to al-Qaeda operatives; White House Press Secretary Scott McClellan claimed that there were no plans to raise the U.S. terrorism alert level, as no specific codes or threats were found to have been made in the tape. Indian intelligence official B. Raman came to the same conclusion.

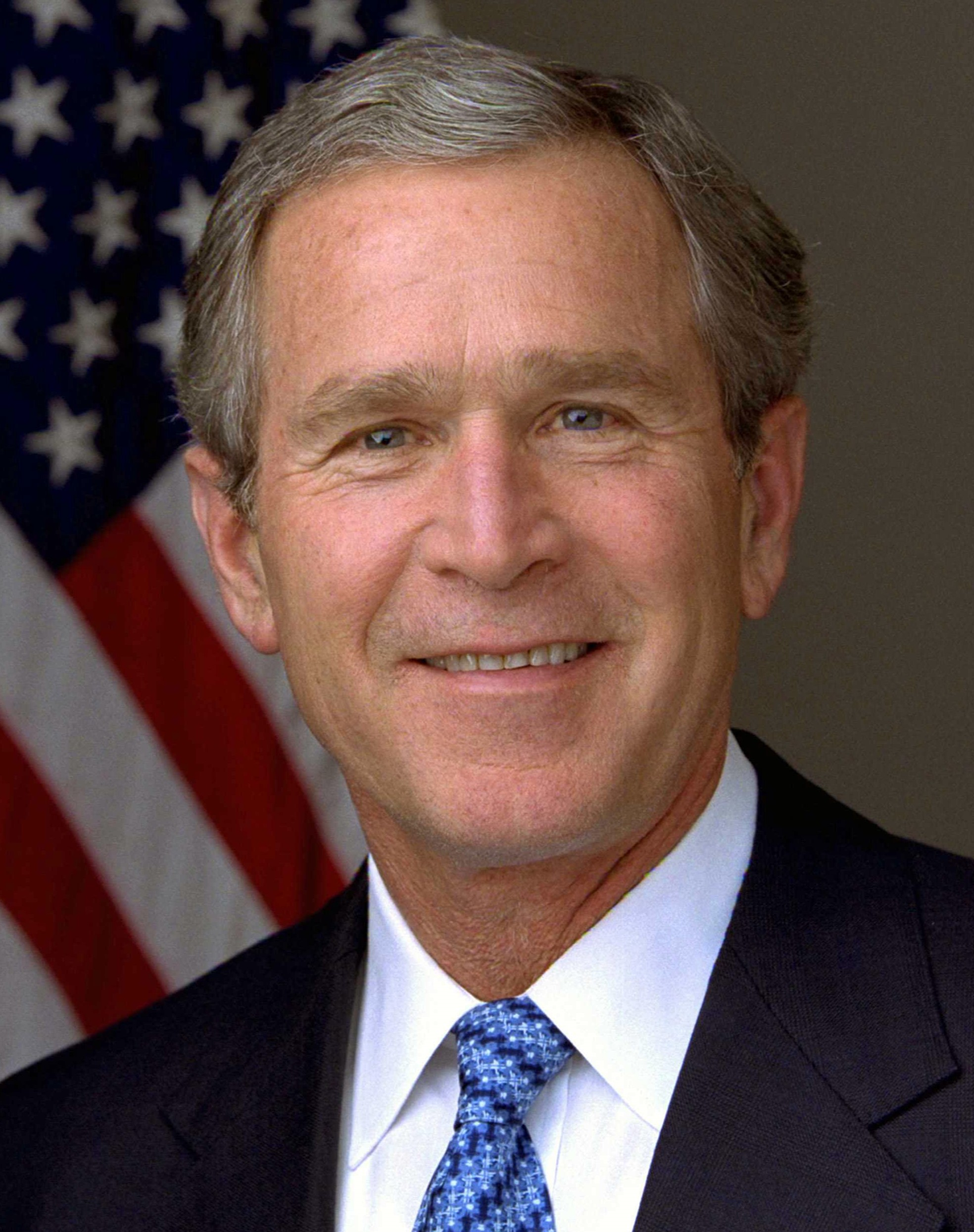
George W. Bush

John Kerry

The video demonstrated that bin Laden was still alive by mid-to-late 2004. Not only does he state that 9/11 was three years ago, he makes references that seem plausible for that period. In one instance, he threatens the U.S. while mentioning U.S. Senator John Kerry, who was the Democratic nominee for the presidential election. Kerry's opponent was incumbent president George W. Bush. Bin Laden says:

"I tell you in truth, that your security is not in the hands of Kerry, nor Bush, nor al-Qaeda. No. Your security is in your own hands. And every state that doesn’t play with our security has automatically guaranteed its own security."

One of the physical tapes was stamped with the date "10 Ramadan", or October 24, but the legitimacy of the date is unknown.

== Content ==
=== Motives for 9/11 ===
Bin Laden dismisses recent claims by Bush that 9/11 occurred because Islamic extremists "hate freedom":

"If Bush says we hate freedom, let him tell us why we didn't attack Sweden, for example. It is known that freedom-haters don't have defiant spirits like those of the nineteen [hijackers]—may God have mercy on them".

He claims he targeted the Twin Towers as revenge for U.S.-backed Israeli troops attacking Muslim or Muslim-majority nations—like Israel's historical attacks on Palestine, and specifically the siege of Beirut, Lebanon, in the 1982 Lebanon War:

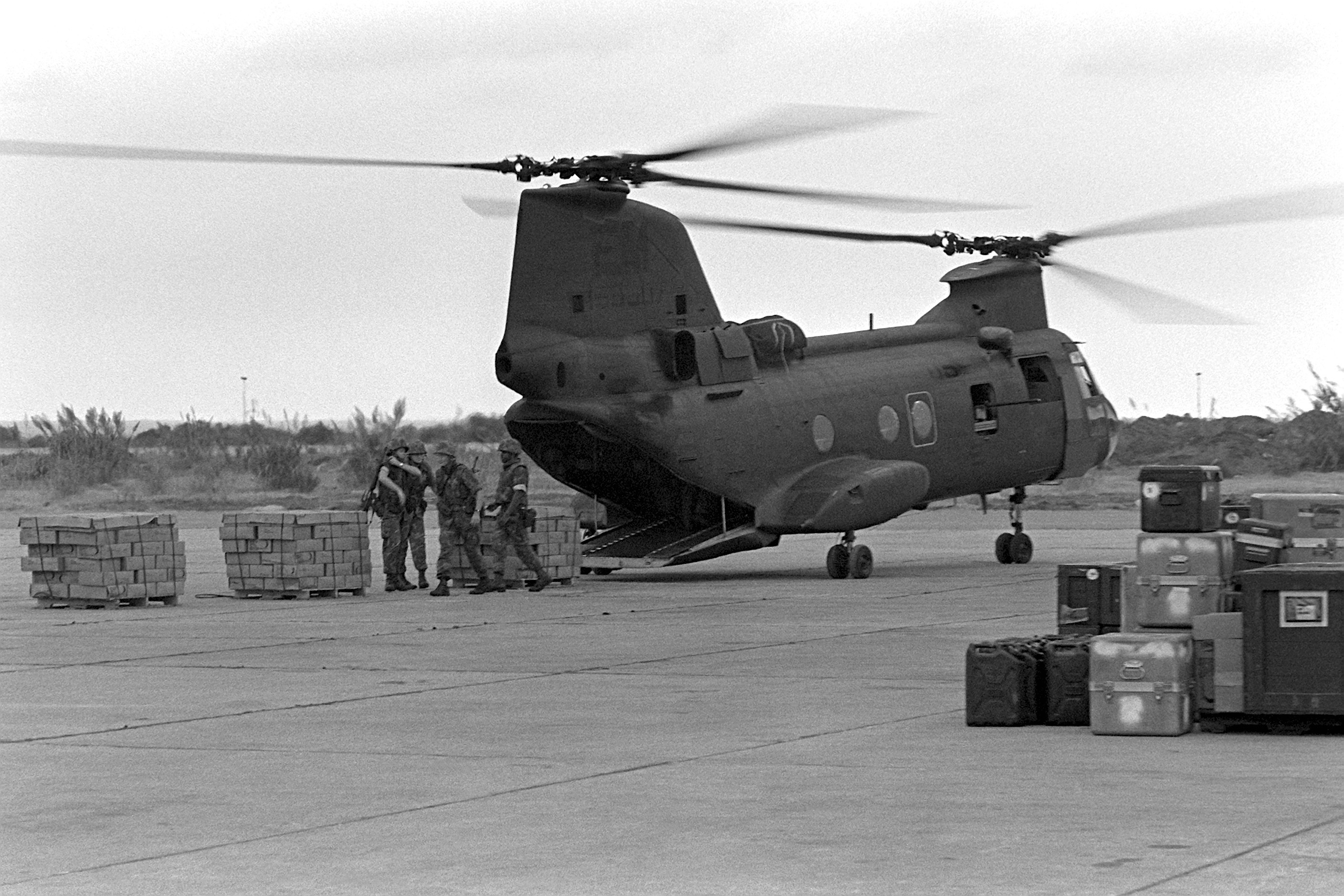
U.S. Marines offloading supplies and equipment in Lebanon during the 1982 Lebanon War

"I say to you, God knows that it had never occurred to us to strike the towers. But after it became unbearable and we witnessed the oppression and tyranny of the American/Israeli coalition against our people in Palestine and Lebanon, it came to my mind.

The events that affected my soul in a direct way started in 1982 when America permitted the Israelis to invade Lebanon and the American Sixth Fleet helped them in that. This bombardment began and many were killed and injured and others were terrorised and displaced. I couldn’t forget those moving scenes, blood and severed limbs, women and children sprawled everywhere. Houses destroyed along with their occupants and high rises demolished over their residents, rockets raining down on our home without mercy.

The situation was like a crocodile meeting a helpless child, powerless except for his screams. Does the crocodile understand a conversation that doesn’t include a weapon? And the whole world saw and heard but it didn’t respond. In those difficult moments many hard-to-describe ideas bubbled in my soul, but in the end they produced an intense feeling of rejection of tyranny, and gave birth to a strong resolve to punish the oppressors. And as I looked at those demolished towers in Lebanon, it entered my mind that we should punish the oppressor in kind and that we should destroy towers in America in order that they taste some of what we tasted and so that they be deterred from killing our women and children."

He tells Americans that "the best way to avoid another" attack like 9/11 is to not threaten the security of Muslim nations.

=== Threatening more attacks ===
Bin Laden also threatens to "bankrupt" the U.S. with more attacks:

"[It is] easy for us to provoke and bait this administration. All that we have to do is to send two mujahideen to the furthest point east to raise a piece of cloth, on which is written 'al-Qaeda', in order to make the generals race there, and cause America to suffer human, economic, and political losses. ... This is in addition to our having experience in using guerrilla warfare and the war of attrition to fight tyrannical superpowers, as we, alongside the [Afghan] mujahideen, bled Russia for ten years, until it went bankrupt and was forced to withdraw [from Afghanistan] in defeat."

He says that Bush's reaction to 9/11 meant that the motivating factors behind the attacks were still present:

"Despite entering the fourth year after 9/11, Bush is still deceiving you and hiding the truth from you, and therefore, the reasons are still there to repeat what happened."

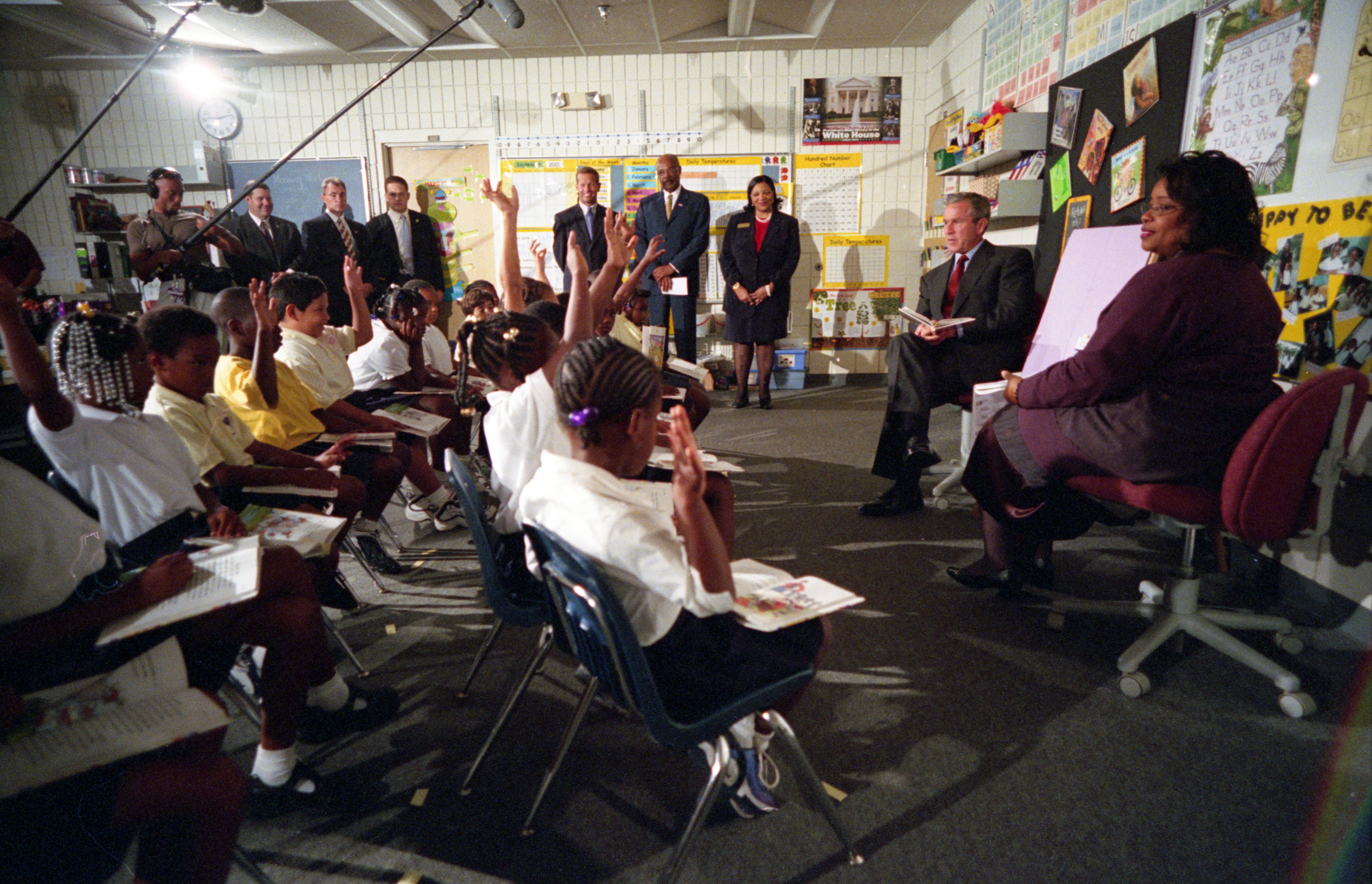
Bush (second from right) reading "The Pet Goat" at Emma E. Booker Elementary School on September 11, 2001

=== Criticism of George W. Bush ===
Bin Laden also criticizes Bush's actions during the attacks, and references the latter's visit to Emma E. Booker Elementary School in Florida that morning. Bush had been notified about Flight 175's crash while listening to students read a story called "The Pet Goat"; White House Chief of Staff Andrew Card discretely interrupted Bush to tell him: "A second plane [Flight 175] hit the second tower [2 WTC]. America is under attack." Another crash made it clear that Flight 11's was not an accident. Bush quietly listened for seven minutes afterwards, and then left the classroom to be briefed by his staff. (Note: While continuing to read, Bush's press secretary, Ari Fleischer, held up a cue card to him that read: "DON'T SAY ANYTHING YET".) Bin Laden implies that the wait helped the hijackers who were still alive carry out their plans:

"It never occurred to us that the commander-in-chief of the American Armed Forces would abandon 50,000 of his citizens in the Twin Towers (Note: Only an estimated 17,400 people were in the towers when Flight 11 crashed.) to face those great horrors alone, the time when they most needed him. [As Bush] seemed to [decide that] occupying himself by talking to the little girl about the goat and its butting was more important than occupying himself with the planes and their butting of the skyscrapers, we were given three times the period required to execute the operations—all praise is due to God."

Flight 77 had already been hijacked when Card spoke at 9:05 a.m. EST. The last plane to be hijacked was Flight 93, at 9:28; as mentioned, it failed to reach the hijackers' target. Bin Laden's mention of "The Pet Goat" is an indicator of the video's recording date, as public attention to the story first came with the documentary film Fahrenheit 9/11, which premiered in May 2004.

== Responses ==
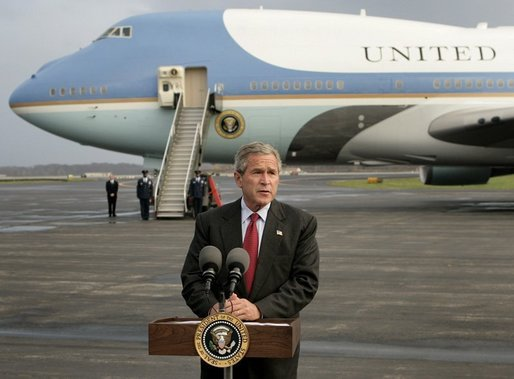
Bush speaking in front of Air Force One at Express Airport in Toledo, Ohio

Hours after the tape was broadcast, Bush gave a short statement to the media at Express Airport in Toledo, Ohio:

"Let me make this very clear: Americans will not be intimidated or influenced by an enemy of our country. I'm sure Senator Kerry agrees with this. I also want to say to the American people that we're at war with these terrorists and I am confident that we will prevail."

Kerry also gave a statement:

"Let me make it clear, crystal clear: as Americans, we are absolutely united in our determination to hunt down and destroy Osama bin Laden and the terrorists. They are barbarians, and I will stop at absolutely nothing to hunt down, capture or kill the terrorists wherever they are, whatever it takes. Period."

Political analysts claim that the timing of Al Jazeera's broadcast, four days before the election, may have partially led to Bush's win against Kerry. Supposedly, Americans' fear of terrorism after 9/11 was reintroduced by the video, which, to many voters, made Bush seem like a stronger protector of America than Kerry, whose opponents accused him of being weak on terrorism. Bush's approval ratings increased after the tape. He opened up a six-point lead over Kerry in the first opinion poll to include sampling taken after the broadcast. However, a CNN poll showed that Kerry was favored 53% to 47% by people who considered the tape "very important".

== See also ==
- October surprise
- The One Percent Doctrine

== Sources ==
- Complete Arabic text of 2004 Osama bin Laden videotape on al-Jazeera
- Complete English translation text of 2004 Osama bin Laden videotape on Al-Jazeera
- Michael, Maggie. Bin Laden, in statement to U.S. people, says he ordered Sept. 11 attacks. The Associated Press. October 29, 2004.
- Excerpts from the BBC. October 29, 2004.
