= Responsibility for the September 11 attacks =

Assessment that al Qaeda attacked the US

At around 9:30 pm on September 11, 2001, George Tenet, director of the Central Intelligence Agency (CIA), told President George W. Bush and U.S. senior officials that the CIA's Counterterrorism Center had determined that Osama bin Laden and al-Qaeda were responsible for the September 11 attacks. Two weeks after the terrorist attacks on September 11, 2001, the Federal Bureau of Investigation connected the hijackers to al-Qaeda, a militant Salafist Islamist multi-national organization. In a number of video, audio, interview and printed statements, senior members of al-Qaeda have also asserted responsibility for organizing the September 11 attacks.

== Identifying the hijackers ==
The FBI investigation into the attacks, codenamed operation PENTTBOM, identified the 19 hijackers within days, as they made little effort to conceal their names on flights, credit cards, and other records. By checking flight manifests and comparing them with other information, like watch lists, customs officials found the names of all 19 hijackers quickly.

Passengers and crew aboard the flights provided information about the hijackers while the hijacking was in progress. Two flight attendants on American Airlines Flight 11, Betty Ong and Madeline Amy Sweeney, contacted airline personnel on the ground. Sweeney provided the seat numbers of the hijackers, and descriptions of the men, identifying Mohamed Atta as one of the hijackers. A flight attendant on United Airlines Flight 175 called a United Airlines mechanic and reported that hijackers had killed the crew. While the hijacking was in progress on American Airlines Flight 77, several passengers, including a flight attendant, Renee May, contacted and reported details of the hijacking to persons on the ground. Sales clerks identified two individuals to whom they sold tickets on Flight 77 as the hijackers Hani Hanjour and Majed Moqed. During the hijacking of United Airlines Flight 93, Jeremy Glick identified the hijackers as Arabic-looking and carrying box-cutters.

Atta's luggage did not make the connection from his Portland flight to American Airlines Flight 11. In his suitcase, authorities found a handwritten letter in Arabic. As well, a handwritten letter was found at the crash site of United Airlines Flight 93 near Shanksville, Pennsylvania, and another in al-Hazmi's vehicle. When examining Atta's left-behind luggage, the FBI found important clues about the hijackers and their plans. Atta's luggage contained instructional videotapes for flying large aircraft, a fuel consumption calculator, and a flight plan, along with a copy of the Quran. His luggage also contained papers that revealed the identity of all 19 hijackers, along with a copy of Atta's last will and testament. The passport of hijacker Abdulaziz al-Omari was also found in Atta's luggage.

Various items of evidence were found in vehicles left behind at the airports, in luggage that did not make it onto the flights, and at the crash scenes. A rental car belonging to the hijackers was found at Boston's Logan International Airport, which contained an Arabic language flight manual and documents from Huffman Aviation in Florida. There, investigators found Atta and Marwan al-Shehhi's previous address in Hamburg, Germany. Nawaf al-Hazmi's 1988 blue Toyota Corolla was found on September 12 in Dulles International Airport's hourly parking lot. Inside the vehicle, authorities found a letter written by Atta, maps of Washington, D.C. and New York City, a cashier's check made out to a Phoenix flight school, four drawings of a Boeing 757 cockpit, a box cutter-type knife, and a page with notes and phone numbers.

In New York City, a passport belonging to Satam al-Suqami was found by a passerby before the towers collapsed, and given to a NYPD detective. The passports of two of the hijackers of Flight 93 were also found intact at the crash site.

Abu Jandal, who served as bin Laden's chief bodyguard for years, confirmed the identity of seven hijackers as al-Qaeda members during interrogations with the FBI on September 17. He had been jailed in a Yemeni prison since 2000.

On September 27, 2001, the FBI released photos of the 19 hijackers, along with information about the possible nationalities and aliases of many.

== Assigning responsibility ==
For several months following the September 11 attacks, no one claimed responsibility for the attacks. As such, primary responsibility initially fell solely upon the hijackers, all of whom were killed leaving no message, claim of responsibility, or explanation. As the media covered the attacks unfolding, many quickly speculated that bin Laden was behind the attacks. On the day of the attacks, the National Security Agency intercepted communications that pointed to bin Laden, as did German intelligence agencies. This helped rule out other immediate suspects, such as Croatian nationalists, who had planted a bomb in Grand Central Terminal on September 10, 1976.

Authorities in the United States and Britain also obtained electronic intercepts, including telephone conversations and electronic bank transfers, which indicate that Mohammed Atef, a bin Laden deputy, was a key figure in the planning of the 9/11 attacks. Intercepts were also obtained that revealed conversations that took place days before September 11 between bin Laden and an associate in Pakistan. In those conversations, the two referred to "an incident that would take place in America on, or around, September 11" and they discussed potential repercussions. In another conversation with an associate in Afghanistan, bin Laden discussed the "scale and effects of a forthcoming operation." These conversations did not specifically mention the World Trade Center or the Pentagon, or other specifics.

The investigators quickly linked the 19 men to the terrorist organization al-Qaeda. The New York Times reported on September 12 that: "Authorities said they had also identified accomplices in several cities who had helped plan and execute Tuesday's attacks. Officials said they knew who these people were and important biographical details about many of them. They prepared biographies of each identified member of the hijack teams, and began tracing the recent movements of the men." FBI agents in Florida investigating the hijackers quickly "descended on flight schools, neighborhoods and restaurants in pursuit of leads." At one flight school, "students said investigators were there within hours of Tuesday's attacks." The Washington Post later reported that "In the hours after Tuesday's bombings, investigators searched their files on [Satam] al-Suqami and [Ahmed] al-Ghamdi, noted the pair's ties to [Nabil] al-Marabh and launched a hunt for him."

Based on the evidence, authorities in the United States quickly asserted that Osama bin Laden and his al-Qaeda organization were solely responsible for the attacks, and other suspects were ruled out. The Government of the United Kingdom reached the same conclusion. Although he denied involvement in the attacks at first, Osama bin Laden claimed full responsibility in a 2004 video.

Author Laurie Mylroie, writing in the conservative political magazine The American Spectator in 2006, argued that Khalid Sheikh Mohammed and his family are the primary architects of 9/11 and similar attacks, that Khalid Sheikh Mohammed's association with Osama bin Laden is secondary, and that Al-Qaeda's claim of responsibility for the attack is after the fact and opportunistic. In an opposing point of view, former CIA officer Robert Baer, writing in Time magazine in 2007, asserted that the George W. Bush administration's publicizing of Khalid Sheikh Mohammed's claims of responsibility for 9/11 and numerous other acts was a mendacious attempt to claim that all of the significant actors in 9/11 had been caught.

== Al-Qaeda and Osama bin Laden ==
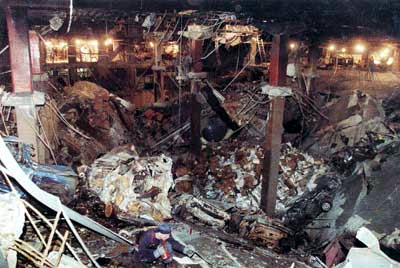
Aftermath of the bomb detonation on the World Trade Center in 1993

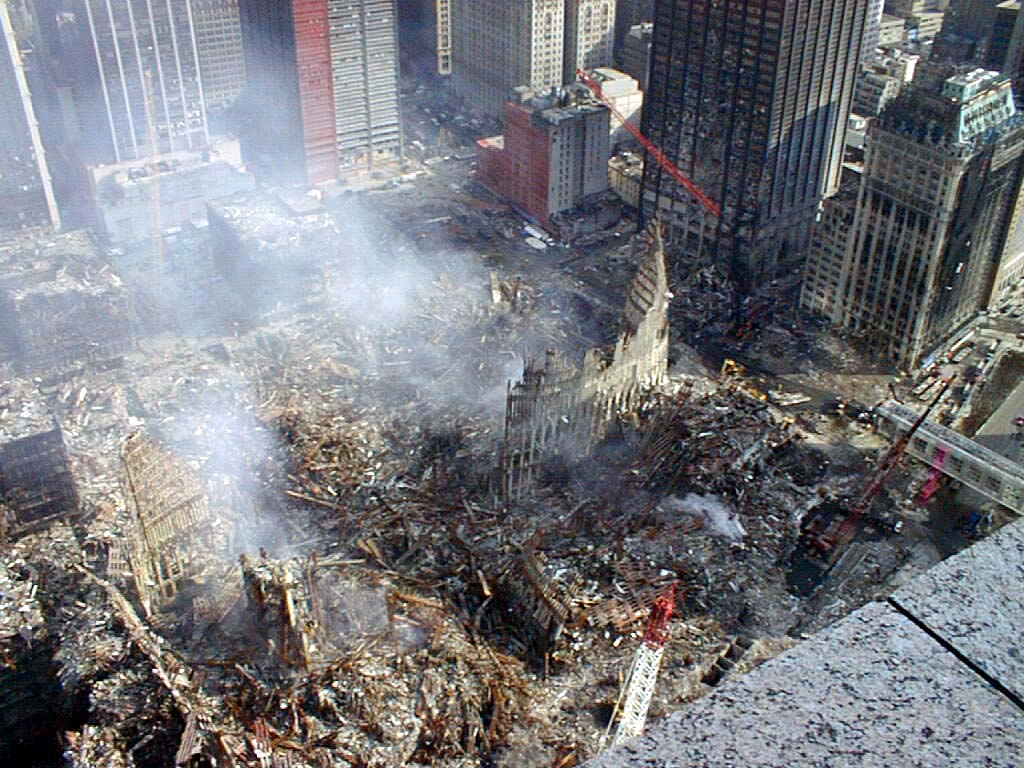
September 14, 2001– "The Pile", Manhattan

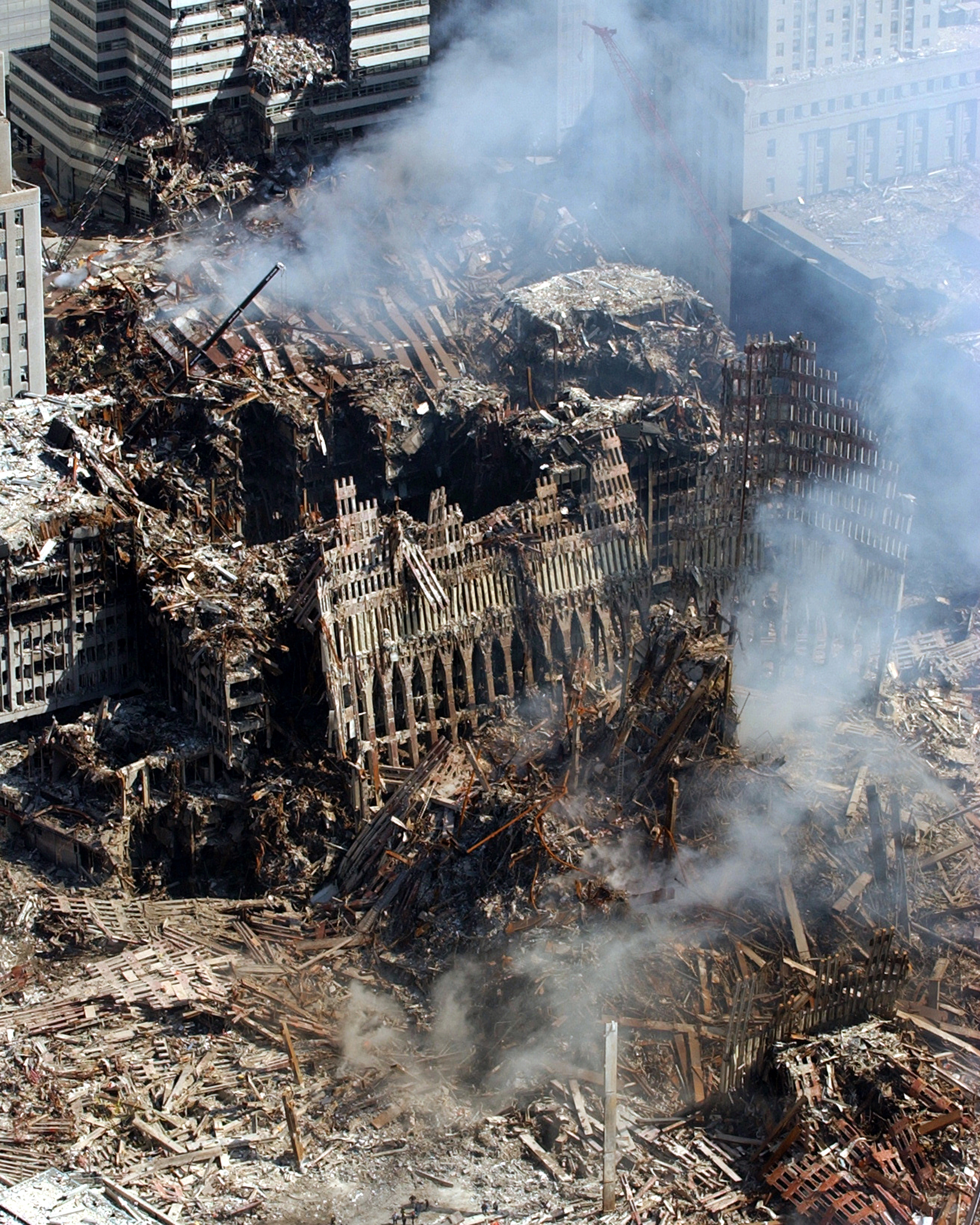
September 17, 2001 – a small portion of the area where the World Trade Center collapsed following the September 11 attacks

Intelligence experts speak of a "short list" of prime suspects—groups that possess both the means and the motive to carry out the crime. Two of the passengers had been identified as al-Qaeda members and were on the FBI's terrorist-alert list prior to 9/11: Khalid al-Mihdhar and Nawaf al-Hazmi. It appears certain that all hijackers had Arab origins, and none were Afghan; moreover, both in their immense scale, careful planning and refraining from claiming responsibility, the attacks are reminiscent of al-Qaeda's previous attacks such as the 1998 US embassy bombings that killed over 200 people.

=== 1993 World Trade Center bombing ===
In the World Trade Center bombing (February 26, 1993) a car bomb was detonated by Arab Islamist terrorists in the underground parking garage below Tower One of the World Trade Center in New York City. The 1,500 lb (680 kg) urea nitrate-fuel oil device killed six and injured over a thousand people. It was intended to devastate the foundation of the North Tower, causing it to collapse onto its twin.

The attack was planned by a group of conspirators including Ramzi Yousef, Sheik Omar Abdel-Rahman, El Sayyid Nosair, Mahmud Abouhalima, Mohammad Salameh, Nidal Ayyad, Ahmad Ajaj, and Abdul Rahman Yasin. They received financing from al-Qaeda member Khalid Shaikh Mohammed, Yousef's uncle, who would later allegedly admit to planning the September 11 attacks.

=== Statements of motives prior to attacks ===
Starting in 1996, Osama bin Laden stated in public proclamations (fatwas) and in interviews with journalists his common list of grievances which he cited as the reason for his declaration of war against the United States.

In 1998, bin Laden and Ayman al-Zawahiri (a leader of Egyptian Islamic Jihad) co-signed a fatwa (binding religious edict) in the name of the World Islamic Front for Jihad Against Jews and Crusaders, declaring:

[t]he ruling to kill the Americans and their allies civilians and military – is an individual duty for every Muslim who can do it in any country in which it is possible to do it, in order to liberate the al-Aqsa Mosque (in Jerusalem) and the holy mosque (in Makka) from their grip, and in order for their armies to move out of all the lands of Islam, defeated and unable to threaten any Muslim. This is in accordance with the words of Almighty Allah, "and fight the pagans all together as they fight you all together," and "fight them until there is no more tumult or oppression, and there prevail justice and faith in Allah".

In an interview with journalist Rahimullah Yusufzai published in Time on January 11, 1999, Osama bin Laden was quoted as saying:

The International Islamic Front for Jihad against the US and Israel has issued a crystal-clear fatwa calling on the Islamic nation to carry on jihad aimed at liberating holy sites. The nation of Muhammad has responded to this appeal. If the instigation for jihad against the Jews and the Americans in order to liberate Al-Aksa Mosque and the Holy Ka'aba Islamic shrines in the Middle East is considered a crime, then let history be a witness that I am a criminal.

=== Planning the attacks ===
According to interviews by Al Jazeera as well as United States interrogations of al-Qaeda members Ramzi bin al-Shibh and Khalid Sheikh Mohammed (captured in 2002 and 2003 respectively), Khalid Sheikh Mohammed was the instigator and prime organizer of the attacks. bin al-Shibh may have been picked as a hijacker but he failed to get into the United States.

Khalid Mohammed had provided funding to his nephew Ramzi Yousef for the World Trade Center bombing in 1993. In addition, he collaborated on Oplan Bojinka which called for ten or more airliners to be bombed in mid-air or hijacked for use as missiles. Planning for Oplan Bojinka began in 1994, and was funded in part by Osama bin Laden, but was thwarted by an accidental fire in 1995.

In mid-1996, Khalid Mohammed presented a new plan to the leadership of al-Qaeda that called for several airplanes on both east and west coasts to be hijacked and flown into targets.

According to bin al-Shibh and Khalid Mohammed, six of the hijackers played active parts in the planning, including the four who became the pilots. The other two were Khalid al-Mihdhar and Nawaf al-Hazmi. CIA operatives reportedly monitored the movements of these two known militants when they visited the US but did not notify the FBI or gain an inkling of what the hijackers were planning. However, during a 2006 Moussaoui trial cross-examination, FBI agents stated that the bureau was aware, years before the attacks in 2001, that al-Qaeda planned to use planes to destroy important buildings. Philippine Chief Superintendent Avelino Razon had noted such plans during the 1995 investigation of Oplan Bojinka, of which Razon said:

I didn't imagine that they would ram a 757 aircraft into the World Trade Center. I thought the suicide mission [would involve] a Cessna light aircraft loaded with several kilos of explosives, like a Japanese Kamikaze World War II pilot diving into a target.

The targets ultimately chosen were the World Trade Center, the Pentagon, and the United States Capitol. Flight 93 was apparently meant to crash into the Capitol. The White House was considered as a target; initially dismissed as being too difficult to locate from the air, it was later included in the plans. In the communications that developed as the scheme took form, the Pentagon's code name was the Faculty of Arts, Capitol Hill was the Faculty of Law, and the World Trade Center was coded as the Faculty of Town Planning.

=== Al-Qaeda statements after attacks ===
Al-Qaeda's spokesman, Sulaiman Abu Ghaith, said in a video sent to Al Jazeera and broadcast in October 2001 the following:

The Americans should know that the storm of plane attacks will not abate, with God's permission. There are thousands of the Islamic nations' youths who are eager to die just as the Americans are eager to live.

=== Osama bin Laden statements after attacks ===
Prior to his death on May 2, 2011, the FBI listed bin Laden as one of the "10 Most Wanted" in connection with several incidents including the USS Cole bombing and the 1998 United States embassy bombings in East Africa. The FBI's "FBI Most Wanted Terrorists" poster does not specifically hang responsibility for 9/11 on bin Laden, instead it only states "Bin Laden is a suspect in other terrorist attacks throughout the world." FBI spokesman Rex Tomb said, however: "There's no mystery here. They could add 9/11 on there, but they have not because they don't need to at this point. ... There is a logic to it", namely, the long-standing practice of only putting criminal charges on the notice. Bin Laden was charged with the 1998 embassy bombings, not 9/11. David N. Kelley, the former U.S. attorney in New York who dealt with terrorism-related cases at the time of bin Laden's indictment for the 1998 bombings, explained that, "It might seem a little strange from the outside, but it makes sense from a legal point of view. If I were in government, I'd be troubled if I were asked to put up a wanted picture where no formal charges had been filed, no matter who it was." The FBI later added Bin Laden's authorship of 9/11 to his database.

Immediately after September 11, 2001, bin Laden praised the attacks, but denied responsibility for them. In a statement issued to Al Jazeera on 16 September 2001, Bin Laden stated:

"The U.S. government has consistently blamed me for being behind every occasion its enemies attack it. ... I would like to assure the world that I did not plan the recent attacks, which seems to have been planned by people for personal reasons.. I have been living in the Islamic emirate of Afghanistan and following its leaders' rules. The current leader does not allow me to exercise such operations"

According to a CNN report, Taliban government in Afghanistan denied that Bin Laden had any ties to September 11 attack and claimed that he had no access to communications with the outside world. In an interview with bin Laden published in the Pakistani newspaper Ummat Karachi on September 28, 2001, he stated:

"I have already said that I am not involved in the September 11 attacks in the United States. As a Muslim, I try my best to avoid telling a lie. I had no knowledge of these attacks, nor do I consider the killing of innocent women, children and other humans as an appreciable act. Islam strictly forbids causing harm to innocent women, children and other people. Such a practice is forbidden even in the course of a battle. It is the United States, which is perpetrating every maltreatment on women, children and common people of other faiths, particularly the followers of Islam."

In late October 2001, Al Jazeera journalist Tayseer Allouni conducted an interview with Osama bin Laden which was videotaped. Al-Jazeera refused to broadcast it and terminated its affiliation agreement with CNN due to CNN's broadcasting of the interview on January 31, 2002. In the interview, bin Laden addressed the September 11 attacks, saying:

they have done this because of our words—and we have previously incited and roused them to action—in self-defense, defense of our brothers and sons in Palestine, and in order to free our holy sanctuaries. And if inciting for these reasons is terrorism, and if killing those that kill our sons is terrorism, then let history witness that we are terrorists.

In November 2001, US forces recovered a videotape from a bombed house in Jalalabad, Afghanistan which showed a man purported to be Osama bin Laden talking to Khaled al-Harbi. In the tape, bin Laden talks of planning the attacks. Translations from the tape include the following lines:

... we calculated in advance the number of casualties from the enemy, who would be killed based on the position of the tower. We calculated that the floors that would be hit would be three or four floors. I was the most optimistic of them all ... We had notification since the previous Thursday that the event would take place that day. We had finished our work that day and had the radio on ... Muhammad [Atta] from the Egyptian family [meaning the al-Qaeda Egyptian group], was in charge of the group ... The brothers, who conducted the operation, all they knew was that they have a martyrdom operation and we asked each of them to go to America but they didn't know anything about the operation, not even one letter. But they were trained and we did not reveal the operation to them until they are there and just before they boarded the planes.

In May 2002, FBI Director Robert Mueller noted that his organization had not uncovered a single piece of paper, "either here in the U.S. or in the treasure trove of information that has turned up in Afghanistan and elsewhere", that mentioned any aspect of the September 11 plot.

In late November 2002, a letter attributed to bin Laden and translated by British Islamists surfaced, often called bin Laden's "letter to America". It states the motive behind the September 11 attacks as being: "because you attacked us and continue to attack us" and justifies the selection of a civilian target. Itemizing a list of perceived Western wrongdoings, the letter concludes that "the oppressed have a right to return the aggression" and hinted at further attacks. Also included are a list of demands, advice, and a statement of grievances against the American government and its people.

On February 11, 2003, Al Jazeera broadcast an audio tape purportedly from bin Laden.

Shortly before the US presidential election in 2004, in a taped statement, bin Laden for the first time publicly acknowledged al-Qaeda's involvement in the attacks on the US, and claimed a direct link to the attacks.

Although we are now into the fourth year since the events of September 11, Bush is still practicing his deception, misleading you about the real reason behind it. As a result, there are still motives for a repeat [attack]. I will explain to you the reasons behind these events, and I will tell you the truth about the moments when this decision was taken, so that you can reflect on it. God knows that the plan of striking the towers had not occurred to us, but the idea came to me when things went just too far with the American-Israeli alliance’s oppression and atrocities against our people in Palestine and Lebanon.

In an audio message that surfaced on the Internet in May 2006, the speaker, who is alleged to be Osama bin Laden, defends Zacarias Moussaoui, who was undergoing a trial for his participation in the September 11 attacks. The voice in the audio message says:

I begin by talking about the honorable brother Zacarias Moussaoui. The truth is that he has no connection whatsoever with the events of September 11th, and I am certain of what I say, because I was responsible for entrusting the 19 brothers—Allah have mercy upon them—with those raids, and I did not assign brother Zacarias to be with them on that mission.

=== Additional al-Qaeda suspects ===
As of 2004, several people—including Mohammed, bin al-Shibh, and Mohammed al Qahtani, the 20th hijacker—were being held by the US as illegal combatants; however, the United States had no one on trial for the attacks. In Germany, Mounir el-Motassadeq was convicted of over 3000 counts of accessory to murder for helping finance the hijackers but the verdict was put aside and a new trial scheduled. Abdelghani Mzoudi was acquitted in Germany on the same charges.

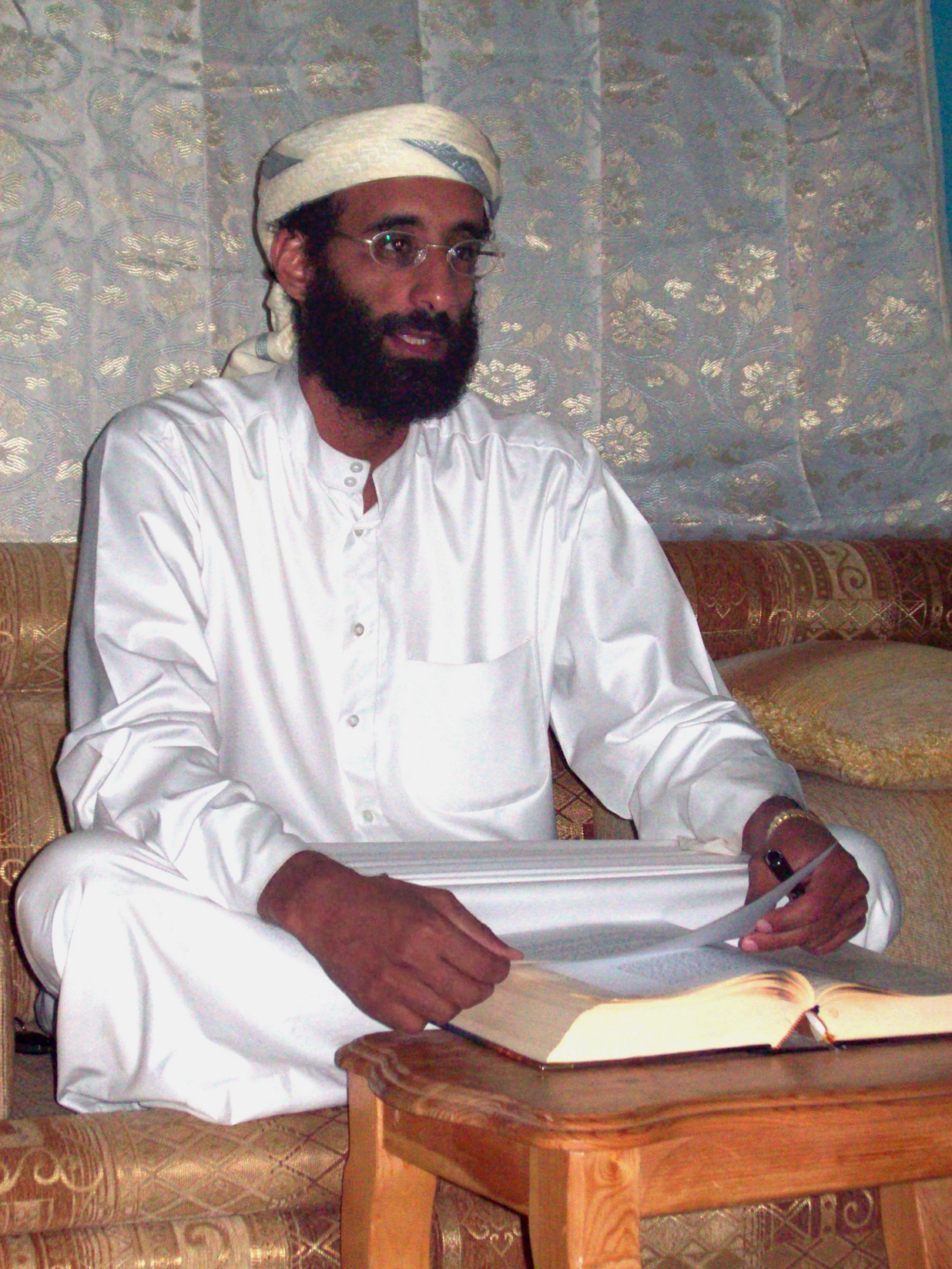
Anwar al-Awlaki

Imam Anwar al-Awlaki has been linked to Al-Qaeda and persons involved in the attacks, though he denied any connections. In 1998 and 1999, he served as vice president for the Charitable Society for Social Welfare (CSSW) in San Diego, founded by Abdul Majeed al-Zindani of Yemen, who has since been placed on many terrorism lists. During a terrorism trial, Federal Bureau of Investigation (FBI) agent Brian Murphy testified that CSSW was a "front organization to funnel money to terrorists," and US federal prosecutors have described it as being used to support Osama bin Laden and al-Qaeda. The FBI investigated al-Awlaki beginning in June 1999 through March 2000 for possible fundraising for Hamas, links to al-Qaeda, and a visit in early 2000 by a close associate of "the blind sheik" Omar Abdel-Rahman (who was in prison for his role in the 1993 World Trade Center attack until his death in 2017). The FBI's interest was also triggered by the fact that he had been contacted by a possible "procurement agent" for bin Laden, Ziyad Khaleel, who helped purchase a satellite phone to call his Yemen communications hub that was used in planning the attacks. But the FBI was unable to unearth sufficient evidence for a criminal prosecution.

While al-Awlaki was an imam in San Diego, witnesses told the FBI he had a close relationship with two of the hijackers in the September 11 attacks (Nawaf al-Hazmi and Khalid al-Mihdhar) in 2000, and served as their spiritual advisor. The 9/11 Commission Report indicated that the hijackers also "reportedly respected [him] as a religious figure." Authorities say the two hijackers regularly attended the mosque he led in San Diego, and al-Awlaki had many closed-door meetings with them, which led investigators to believe al-Awlaki knew about the 9/11 attacks in advance. He left San Diego in mid-2000, traveling to "various countries".

In January 2001, he headed east and served as Imam at the Dar Al-Hijrah mosque in the metropolitan Washington, DC, area. Esam Omeish hired al-Awlaki to be the mosque's imam. Fluent in English, known for giving eloquent talks on Islam, and with a mandate to attract young non-Arabic speakers, al-Awlaki "was the magic bullet", according to mosque spokesman Johari Abdul-Malik; "he had everything all in a box." "He had an allure. He was charming."

Shortly after this, his sermons were attended by two of the 9/11 hijackers (al-Hazmi again, and Hani Hanjour; which the 9/11 Commission Report concluded "may not have been coincidental"), and by Fort Hood shooter Nidal Malik Hasan. Furthermore, when police raided the Hamburg, Germany, apartment of Ramzi bin al-Shibh (the "20th hijacker") while investigating the 9/11 attacks, his telephone number was found among bin al-Shibh's personal contact information. "In my view, he is more than a coincidental figure," said House Intelligence Committee member Representative Anna Eshoo (D-CA).

Writing on the IslamOnline website six days after the 9/11 attacks, he suggested that Israeli intelligence agents might have been responsible for the attacks, and that the FBI "went into the roster of the airplanes and whoever has a Muslim or Arab name became the hijacker by default."

On August 31, 2006, al-Awlaki was arrested with a group of five Yemenis by Yemeni authorities. He claims it was with regard to a "secret police investigation" over "tribal issues", but it has been reported to relate to charges of kidnapping a Shiite teenager for ransom, and involvement in an al-Qaeda plot to kidnap a U.S. military attaché. al-Awlaki blames the U.S. for pressuring the Yemeni authorities to arrest him, and says that in approximately September 2007 he was interviewed by FBI agents with regard to the 9/11 attacks and other subjects. Gregory Johnsen, a Yemen expert, noted that his name was on a list of 100 prisoners whose release was sought by al-Qaeda-linked militants in Yemen.

Although al-Awlaki was covered as a relatively minor figure in the 9/11 attacks, his involvement was noted again in 2009 after the Fort Hood shooting where the suspect had been found to be communicating by e-mail to al-Awlaki in Yemen, he was later linked to several terror plots and attacks in the US, Canada and UK, including the Northwest Airlines Flight 253 attack by his former student Umar Farouk Abdulmutallab.

== Taliban ==
On October 4, 2001, British Prime Minister Tony Blair released information compiled by Western intelligence agencies connecting Osama bin Laden to Afghanistan's Taliban leadership as well as being the leader of the al-Qaeda organization. The Taliban government gave a safe haven to Osama bin Laden in the years leading up to the attack, and his al-Qaeda network may have had a close relationship with the Taliban army and police. On the day of 9/11, Taliban foreign minister Wakil Ahmed Muttawakil told the Arab television network Al Jazeera: "We denounce this terrorist attack, whoever is behind it."

The United States requested the Taliban to shut down all al-Qaeda bases in Afghanistan, open them to inspection and turn over Osama bin Laden. The Taliban refused all these requests. Instead, they offered to extradite Osama bin Laden to an Islamic country, for trial under Islamic law, if the United States presented evidence of his guilt. The Taliban had previously refused to extradite bin Laden to the United States, or prosecute him, after he was indicted by the US federal courts for involvement in the 1998 United States embassy bombings in Kenya and Tanzania. The Taliban deemed eyewitness testimony and satellite phone call recordings entered into the public record in February 2001 during a trial as insufficient grounds to extradite bin Laden for his involvement in the bombings.

Invoking the Bush Doctrine, which stated "We will make no distinction between the terrorists and those who harbor them", the United States and Britain invaded and overthrew the Taliban regime in 2001, using air power, special forces and the Northern Alliance as a land army.

On November 29, 2007, a videotape was released that the Central Intelligence Agency says is likely to be from bin Laden. In it the speaker claims sole responsibility for the attacks and specifically denies any prior knowledge of them by the Taliban or the Afghan people.

== Financing the attacks ==
According to the 9/11 Commission Report, the 9/11 plotters spent between $400,000 and $500,000 to plan and conduct the attack:

al-Qaeda funded the plotters. KSM [Khalid Sheikh Mohammad] provided his operatives with nearly all the money they needed to travel to the United States, train, and live ... The US government has not been able to determine the origin of the money used for the 9/11 attacks. Ultimately the question is of little practical significance.

The 9/11 Commission Report concludes: "we have seen no evidence that any foreign government – or foreign government official – supplied any funding." The difficulty in tracking the funding is due to the traditional means of zakat, a Muslim form of charitable giving essential to proper following of the faith and hawala, another ancient system of transferring funds based on trust and connections, including family, clan, and regional affiliations.

=== Pakistan ===
CNN and other news outlets reported in September and October 2001 that $100,000 was wired from the United Arab Emirates to lead hijacker Mohamed Atta prior to the attacks, by Ahmed Omar Saeed (Syed) Sheikh, a long time Pakistani Inter-Services Intelligence asset.

The report, which was later confirmed by CNN, stated that "Atta then distributed the funds to conspirators in Florida ... In addition, sources have said Atta sent thousands of dollars – believed to be excess funds from the operation – back to Syed in the United Arab Emirates in the days before September 11. Syed also is described as a key figure in the funding operation of al-Qaeda"

The day after this report was published, the head of Pakistan's Inter-Services Intelligence, Gen. Mahmood Ahmed, was fired from his position. Indian news outlets reported the FBI was investigating the possibility that Gen. Mahmood Ahmed ordered Saeed Sheikh to send the $100,000 to Atta, while most Western media outlets only reported his connections to the Taliban as the reason for his departure.

The Wall Street Journal was one of the few Western news organizations to follow up on the story, citing the Times of India: "US authorities sought [Gen. Mahmood Ahmed's] removal after confirming the fact that $100,000 [was] wired to WTC hijacker Mohamed Atta from Pakistan by Ahmad Umar Sheikh at the insistence of General Mahmood."

=== Saudi Arabia ===
There have been suggestions that Saudi Arabia has some responsibility, having helped finance al-Qaeda, and allowing the organization to flourish. There have been claims that pre-9/11 investigations into al-Qaeda were deliberately blocked via high-level interference from Washington, and that this extends to other groups outside al-Qaeda, in particular individuals from Saudi Arabia. In June 2001, a "high-placed member of a US intelligence agency" told BBC reporter Greg Palast that "after the [2000] elections, the agencies were told to 'back off' investigating the bin Ladens and Saudi royals."

In May 2002, former FBI Agent Robert Wright, Jr. delivered a tearful press conference apologizing to the families who lost loved ones on 9/11. He described how his superiors intentionally obstructed his investigation into al-Qaeda financing. Agent Wright would later tell ABC's Brian Ross that "September 11th is a direct result of the incompetence of the FBI's International Terrorism Unit," specifically referring to the Bureau's hindering of his investigation into Yasin al-Qadi, who Ross described as a powerful Saudi Arabian businessman with extensive financial ties in Chicago. One month after the attacks, the US government officially identified al-Qadi as one of Osama bin Laden's primary financiers, through his Muwafaq Foundation, and they declared him to be a global terrorist. A former FBI Counter Terrorism Agent commented that for someone like al-Qadi to be involved in 9/11 is "of grave concern."

In June 2009 lawyers for the 9/11 victims' families provided documents to The New York Times. The families of the victims formed an organization called Families United to Bankrupt Terrorism and filed a civil suit in U.S. federal court that sought to hold The Saudi royal family responsible for supporting al-Qaeda. On June 29, 2009, the United States Supreme Court refused to hear an appeal of a lower court decision that held that the Royal Family are immune from suits in U.S. courts due to a 1976 law. According to The Times, "the documents provide no smoking gun connecting the royal family to the events of Sept. 11, 2001. And the broader links rely at times on a circumstantial, connect-the-dots approach to tie together Saudi princes, Middle Eastern charities, suspicious transactions and terrorist groups". According to the Royal family's lawyer, "in looking at all the evidence the families brought together, I have not seen one iota of evidence that Saudi Arabia had anything to do with the 9/11 attacks".

In February 2012, former U.S. senators Bob Graham and Bob Kerrey made sworn statements filed in federal court as part of this litigation commenced by the 9/11 victims' families in which the former senators stated that the government of Saudi Arabia might have played a direct role in the 9/11 attacks. The two senators had reviewed top secret information concerning the 9/11 attacks when they were in the Senate. "I am convinced that there was a direct line between at least some of the terrorists who carried out the September 11th attacks and the government of Saudi Arabia," stated former senator Graham in his sworn court document. According to Graham's sworn statement, unanswered questions remain regarding Saudi-sponsored financial links to al-Qaeda and the role of Omar al-Bayoumi, a Saudi citizen living in San Diego with ties to two of the 9/11 hijackers and to officials of the government of Saudi Arabia. There remains substantial unreleased documentation related to these issues.

On February 4, 2015, former al-Qaeda operative Zacarias Moussaoui who is imprisoned for life for his role in 9/11 attacks, told lawyers that members of the Saudi royal family, including former intelligence chief Prince Turki al-Faisal Al Saud, supported al-Qaeda to carry out its attacks.

According to a May 2017 Foreign Agents Registration Act document, the Royal Embassy of Saudi Arabia hired Qorvis MSLGROUP for monitoring and campaigning against the news media coverage on JASTA or Justice Against Sponsors of Terrorism Act and the alleged role of the government of Saudi Arabia in the September 11 attacks. Qorvis MSLGROUP filed a Foreign Agents Registration Act document of the contract, stating activities it conducted on behalf of the Royal Embassy of Saudi Arabia. The services included, coordinating with veterans visits to Capitol Hill concerning JASTA, managing grassroots campaign against JASTA and its reporting in news media like CNN, The Wall Street Journal, and The Hill.

== Allegations of supporting Osama bin Laden and al-Qaeda ==
=== Bin Laden family ===
Although the wealthy bin Laden family disowned Osama in 1994 after his alleged involvement in terrorism like the 1993 World Trade Center bombing, the events of 9/11 brought to attention connections between the bin Laden family and the Bush family. It has been alleged that Osama was never disowned and that his family were aware of his activities in the years preceding 9/11. The connections between the bin Laden family and the Bush family have led to conspiracy theories that President George Bush was also aware of Osama's activities and deliberately allowed 9/11 to take place.

The movie Fahrenheit 9/11 shows some business connections between the Bush family and the bin Laden family. It relates how Salem bin Laden invested heavily in Arbusto Energy, a company run by George W. Bush, through his friend James R. Bath. Several members of the Bush family are investors in the Carlyle Group, a defense contractor and investment fund with numerous interests in Saudi Arabia and the Middle East and connections to the Saudi Binladen Group, run by former Reagan administration Secretary of Defense Frank Carlucci. On September 10, 2001, former President George H. W. Bush and several members of his cabinet were present at a Carlyle Group business conference with Shafig bin Laden, a half-brother of Osama bin Laden, at the Ritz-Carlton hotel located several miles from the Pentagon. The conference was continuing with the remaining cabinet members and bin Laden's brother at the time of the Pentagon attack. George H. W. Bush remained an advisor to the Carlyle Group for two years after the attacks.

The New York Times reported that members of the bin Laden family were driven or flown under Federal Bureau of Investigation (FBI) supervision to a secret assembly point in Texas and then to Washington from where they left the country on a private charter plane when airports reopened three days after the attacks. The 9/11 commission later concluded that "the FBI conducted a satisfactory screening of Saudi nationals who left the United States on charter flights" and that the exodus was approved by special advisor Richard Clarke after a request by Saudi Arabia who feared for the safety of their nationals. On June 20, 2007, the public interest group Judicial Watch released FBI documents that it says suggested that Osama bin Laden himself may have chartered one of the flights. Judicial Watch President Tom Fitton accused the FBI of conducting a "slapdash" investigation of the flights.

Author Steve Coll in his 2008 book The bin Ladens: An Arabian Family in the American Century writes that most members of the family barely know Osama. Richard Clarke, in a column about the book, notes that because it was custom at that time for successful Muslim men to have multiple wives, this claim rings true. Clarke also theorizes that the FBI did not question the bin Ladens before they were flown out of the US and have not questioned them since because they already had extensive knowledge about them.

=== Iraq ===
Immediately after the attacks, rumors began that Iraq could have played a role. The state-run Iraqi media praised the attacks but denied that Iraq was responsible. In September 2003, President Bush told the press, "we've had no evidence that Saddam Hussein was involved with September the 11th."

On June 29, 2005 Robin Hayes, a Republican Congressman from North Carolina and vice chairman of the House Subcommittee on Terrorism at that time, stated "evidence is clear" that "Saddam Hussein and people like him were very much involved in 9/11". Senator John McCain reacting to the Congressman's statement said, "I haven't seen compelling evidence of that." The 9/11 Commission Report stated that there is "no credible evidence" that Saddam Hussein's government in Iraq collaborated with the al-Qaeda terrorist network on any attacks on the United States. In September 2006, the Senate Select Committee on Intelligence concluded that "there is no evidence that Saddam Hussein had prewar ties to al-Qaeda and one of the terror organization's most notorious members, Abu Musab al-Zarqawi" and that there was no evidence of any Iraqi support of al-Qaeda or foreknowledge of the September 11 attacks.

Despite this, a number of 9/11 opinion polls have shown that a significant minority of the American public believe that Saddam was "personally involved". The theory extended from the one advanced by investigative journalist Jayna Davis in her book The Third Terrorist linking Hussein to the Oklahoma City Bombing. It was discussed in a 2002 op-ed piece in the Wall Street Journal.

=== Iran ===
The U.S. indictment of bin Laden filed in 1998 stated that al-Qaeda "forged alliances ... with the government of Iran and its associated terrorist group Hezbollah for the purpose of working together against their perceived common enemies." On May 31, 2001, Steven Emerson and Daniel Pipes wrote in The Wall Street Journal that "Officials of the Iranian government helped arrange advanced weapons and explosives training for Al-Qaeda personnel in Lebanon where they learned, for example, how to destroy large buildings."

The 9/11 Commission Report stated that 8 to 10 of the hijackers previously passed through Iran and their travel was facilitated by Iranian border guards. The report also found "circumstantial evidence that senior Hezbollah operatives were closely tracking the travel of some of these future muscle hijackers into Iran in November 2000." Judge George B. Daniels ruled in a federal district court in Manhattan that Iran bears legal responsibility for providing "material support" to the 9/11 plotters and hijackers in Havlish, et al. v. Osama bin Laden, Iran, et al. Included in Judge Daniels' findings were claims that Iran "used front companies to obtain a Boeing 757-767-777 flight simulator for training the terrorists", Ramzi bin al-Shibh traveled to Iran in January 2001, and an Iranian government memorandum from May 14, 2001, demonstrates Iranian culpability in planning the attacks. Defectors from Iran's intelligence service testified that Iranian officials had "foreknowledge of the 9/11 attacks." By contrast, the 9/11 Commission "found no evidence that Iran or Hezbollah was aware of the planning for what later became the 9/11 attack. At the time of their travel through Iran, the al Qaeda operatives themselves were probably not aware of the specific details of their future operation." In addition, both bin al-Shibh and Khalid Sheikh Mohammed denied "any relationship between the hijackers and Hezbollah" and "any other reason for the hijackers' travel to Iran" besides "taking advantage of the Iranian practice of not stamping Saudi passports."

== United States advance knowledge ==
The 9/11 Commission Report concluded that both presidents Bill Clinton and George W. Bush were "not well served" by the FBI and CIA prior to 9/11. It also explained that military response protocols were unsuited for the nature of the attack, and identified operational failures in the emergency response.

Immediately following the attacks, the Bush Administration stated that "nobody in our government at least, and I don't think the prior government, could envisage flying air planes into buildings" (George Bush) and that no-one "could have predicted that they would try to use an airplane as a missile" (Condoleezza Rice). An Air Force general called the attack "something we had never seen before, something we had never even thought of." FBI Director Robert Mueller announced "there were no warning signs that I'm aware of."

The 9/11 Commission Report stated that "the 9/11 attacks were a shock, but they should not have come as a surprise. Islamic extremists had given plenty of warnings that they meant to kill Americans indiscriminately and in large numbers." During the spring and summer of 2001, US intelligence agencies received a stream of warnings about an imminent al-Qaeda attack; according to George Tenet, Director of Central Intelligence, "the system was blinking red." The warnings varied in their level of detail and specificity, and included warnings from both domestic intelligence operations and warnings from foreign governments and intelligence agencies.

In her testimony to the 9/11 Commission, Condoleezza Rice stated that "the threat reporting that we received in the spring and summer of 2001 was not specific as to time nor place nor manner of attack. Almost all the reports focused on al-Qaeda activities outside the United States." On August 6, 2001, the President's Daily Brief was titled Bin Ladin Determined To Strike in US. It warned that bin Laden was planning to exploit his operatives' access to the US to mount a terrorist strike: "FBI information ... indicates patterns of suspicious activity in this country, consistent with preparations for hijackings or other types of attack."

The 9/11 Commission Report outlined the following "opportunities that were not or could not be exploited by the organizations and systems of the time":

- not watchlisting future hijackers al-Hazmi and al-Mihdhar, not trailing them after they traveled to Bangkok, and not informing the FBI about one future hijacker's US visa or his companion's travel to the United States;
- not sharing information linking individuals in the Cole attack to Mihdhar;
- not taking adequate steps in time to find al-Mihdhar or al-Hazmi in the United States;
- not linking the arrest of Zacarias Moussaoui, described as interested in flight training for the purpose of using an airplane in a terrorist attack, to the heightened indications of an attack;
- not discovering false statements on visa applications;
- not recognizing passports manipulated in a fraudulent manner;
- not expanding no-fly lists to include names from terrorist watchlists;
- not searching airline passengers identified by the computer-based CAPPS screening system; and
- not hardening aircraft cockpit doors or taking other measures to prepare for the possibility of suicide hijackings.

With regard to the failures of the US air defense system on the morning of the attacks, the Report explains that:

Existing protocols on 9/11 were unsuited in every respect for an attack in which hijacked planes were used as weapons. What ensued was a hurried attempt to improvise a defense by civilians who had never handled a hijacked aircraft that attempted to disappear, and by a military unprepared for the transformation of commercial aircraft into weapons of mass destruction.

The Report explains that the emergency response was also "necessarily improvised": there were "weaknesses in preparations for disaster, failure to achieve unified incident command, and inadequate communications among responding agencies ... At the Pentagon, [there were] problems of command and control."

== See also ==
- 9/11 conspiracy theories
- 9/11 Commission
- 9/11 Commission Report
