= Motives for the September 11 attacks =

Al-Qaeda claims and arguments for attacking the United States

The September 11 attacks were carried out by 19 hijackers of the Islamist militant organization al-Qaeda. In the 1990s, al-Qaeda leader Osama bin Laden declared a militant jihad against the United States, and issued two fatwas in 1996 and 1998 criticizing various aspects of US foreign policy in the Middle East. In both of these fatawa, Bin Laden sharply criticized the financial contributions of the American government to the Saudi royal family as well as American military intervention in the Arab world and support for Israel.

In the 2004 Osama bin Laden video, he vividly and explicitly describes where he got his primary motivation for the attack. This was his vengeance for the carnage he saw in the media coverage of the Israeli siege of Beirut during the 1982 Lebanon War, where Israel was helped by the United States. Other motivations were published in the 2002 Letter to the American People, in which he said that al-Qaeda's motives for the attacks included American support for attacking Muslims in Somalia, supporting Russian atrocities against Muslims in Chechnya, supporting the Indian oppression against Muslims in Kashmir, condoning the 1982 massacres in Lebanon, the presence of US troops in Saudi Arabia, US support of Israel, and sanctions against Iraq. Bin Laden and Ayman al-Zawahiri said that Israeli repression of Palestinians during the Second Intifada was the immediate cause that forced Al-Qaeda to launch the September 11 attacks.

Following the attacks, the Bush administration stated that al-Qaeda attacked the United States because "they hate us for our freedoms". George W. Bush said in a speech to Congress nine days after the attacks that "They hate what we see right here in this chamber — a democratically elected government. Their leaders are self-appointed. They hate our freedoms — our freedom of religion, our freedom of speech, our freedom to vote and assemble and disagree with each other." Al-Qaeda leadership maintained that United States was targeted in retaliation for its imperialist aggression against the Muslim world. In a speech released in 2004, Bin Laden stated that "free men do not forfeit their security, contrary to Bush's claim that we hate freedom. If so, then let him explain to us why we don't strike for example – Sweden?"

== Sources ==
Before the attacks, Al-Qaeda issued proclamations that provide insight into the motivations for the attacks: one was the fatwā of August 1996, and a second was a shorter fatwā in February 1998. Both documents appeared initially in the Arabic-language London newspaper Al-Quds Al-Arabi. Bin Laden's 1998 fatwā stated:

"The ruling to kill the Americans and their allies -- civilians and military -- is an individual duty for every Muslim who can do it in any country in which it is possible to do it, in order to liberate the al-Aqsa Mosque and the holy mosque [Mecca] from their grip, and in order for their armies to move out of all the lands of Islam, defeated and unable to threaten any Muslim. This is in accordance with the words of Almighty God, "and fight the pagans all together as they fight you all together," and "fight them until there is no more tumult or oppression, and there prevail justice and faith in God.""

The fatwā also denounced the presence of US troops in Saudi Arabia and asserted that Americans were attempting to balkanize and destabilize the Arab world with the intent of guaranteeing "Israel's survival":

"..for over seven years the United States has been occupying the lands of Islam in the holiest of places, the Arabian Peninsula, plundering its riches, dictating to its rulers, humiliating its people, terrorizing its neighbors, and turning its bases in the Peninsula into a spearhead through which to fight the neighboring Muslim peoples."

After the attacks, bin Laden and Ayman al-Zawahiri published dozens of video tapes and audio tapes, many describing the motivations for the attacks. Two particularly important publications were bin Laden's 2002 Letter to the American people, and a 2004 video tape by bin Laden. In addition to direct pronouncements by bin Laden and Al-Qaeda, numerous political analysts have postulated motivations for the attacks.

== Stated motives ==
=== Support of Israel by United States ===
In the 2004 Osama bin Laden video, he vividly and explicitly describes where he got his primary motivation for the attack. This was his vengeance for the carnage he saw in the media coverage of the Israeli siege of Beirut, in the 1982 Lebanon War, where Israel was helped by the United States:

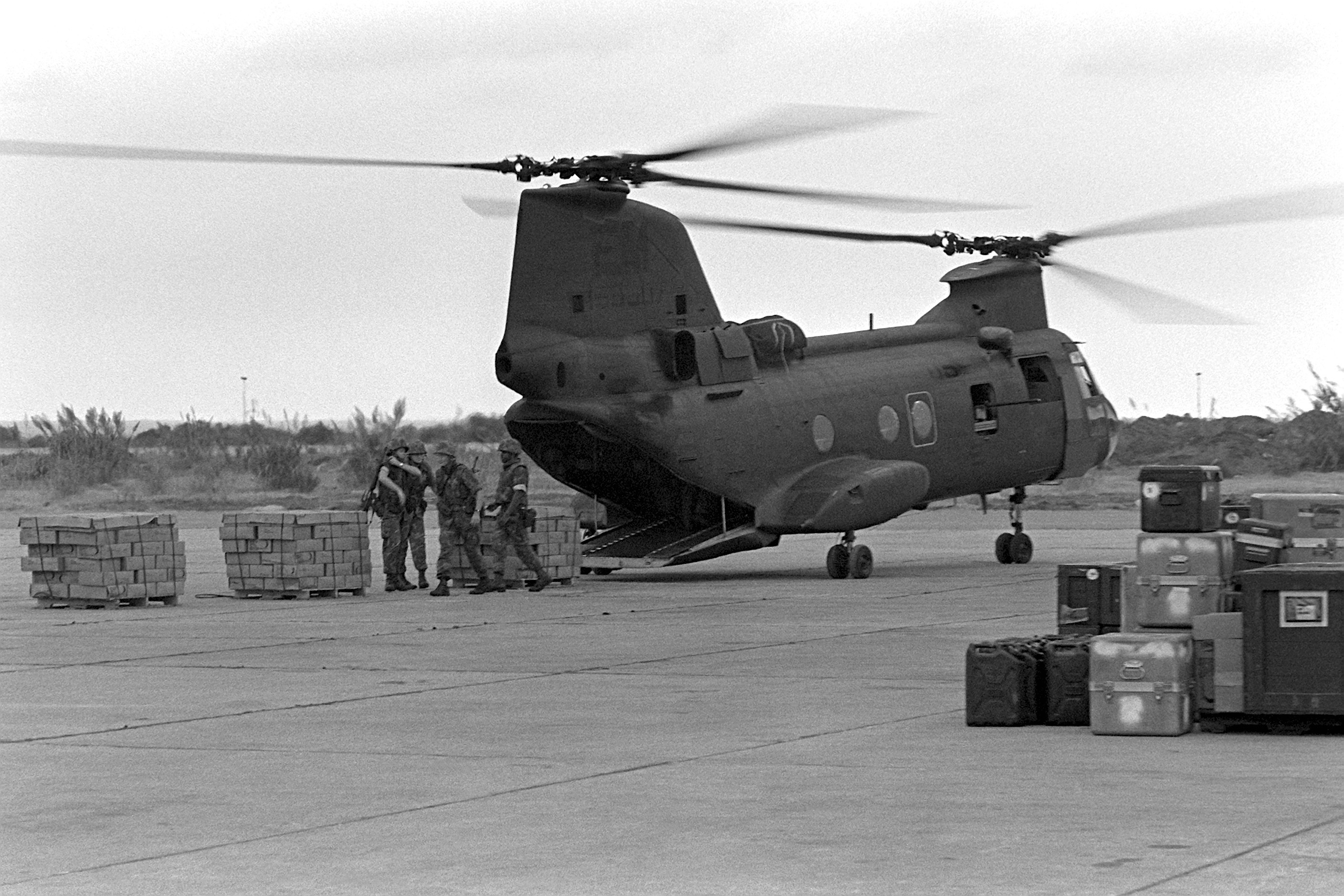
U.S. Marines offloading supplies and equipment in Lebanon during the 1982 Lebanon War

"I say to you, Allah knows that it had never occurred to us to strike the towers. But after it became unbearable and we witnessed the oppression and tyranny of the American/Israeli coalition against our people in Palestine and Lebanon, it came to my mind.

The events that affected my soul in a direct way started in 1982 when America permitted the Israelis to invade Lebanon and the American Sixth Fleet helped them in that. This bombardment began and many were killed and injured and others were terrorised and displaced.

I couldn’t forget those moving scenes, blood and severed limbs, women and children sprawled everywhere. Houses destroyed along with their occupants and high rises demolished over their residents, rockets raining down on our home without mercy.

The situation was like a crocodile meeting a helpless child, powerless except for his screams. Does the crocodile understand a conversation that doesn’t include a weapon? And the whole world saw and heard but it didn’t respond.

In those difficult moments many hard-to-describe ideas bubbled in my soul, but in the end they produced an intense feeling of rejection of tyranny, and gave birth to a strong resolve to punish the oppressors.

And as I looked at those demolished towers in Lebanon, it entered my mind that we should punish the oppressor in kind and that we should destroy towers in America in order that they taste some of what we tasted and so that they be deterred from killing our women and children."

He tells Americans that "the best way to avoid another" attack like 9/11 is to not threaten the security of Muslim nations.

Also, in his 2002 Letter to the American People, bin Laden described the United States' support of Israel as a motivation:

The expansion of Israel is one of the greatest crimes, and you are the leaders of its criminals. And of course there is no need to explain and prove the degree of American support for Israel. The creation of Israel is a crime which must be erased. Each and every person whose hands have become polluted in the contribution towards this crime must pay its price, and pay for it heavily.

In 2004 and 2010, bin Laden again repeated the connection between the September 11 attacks and the support of Israel by the United States. Support of Israel was also mentioned before the attack in the 1998 Al-Qaeda fatwā:

[T]he aim [of the United States] is also to serve the Jews' petty state and divert attention from its occupation of Jerusalem and murder of Muslims there. The best proof of this is their eagerness to destroy Iraq, the strongest neighboring Arab state, and their endeavor to fragment all the states of the region such as Iraq, Saudi Arabia, Egypt, and Sudan into paper statelets and through their disunion and weakness to guarantee Israel's survival and the continuation of the brutal crusade occupation of the Peninsula.

=== Bin Laden's strategy to expand Al-Aqsa Intifada ===
The blood pouring out of Palestine must be equally revenged. You must know that the Palestinians do not cry alone; their women are not widowed alone; their sons are not orphaned alone... With your help and under your protection, the Israelis are planning to destroy the Al-Aqsa mosque. Under the protection of your weapons, Sharon entered the Al-Aqsa mosque, to pollute it as a preparation to capture and destroy it.

— Osama bin Laden's "Letter to the American People" (2002)

The eruption of Al-Aqsa intifada in Israel in 2000 became a powerful inspiration for bin Laden to launch the raids of September 11. As the intifada escalated, bin Laden issued directives to Khalid Sheikh Muhammad and Mohamed Atta to launch the execution of the attacks at an earlier date, on at least two occasions. First occasion was during Ariel Sharon's controversial visit to Al-Haram al-Sharif; which was condemned across the Muslim world and led to the eruption of Al-Aqsa Intifada. Second occasion was when Ariel Sharon visited the White House in March 2001. Throughout this period, Al-Qaeda vehemently denounced Zionist atrocities against Palestinians and denounced the US as being directly complicit in Israeli repression of Palestinians.

Arab media coverage of the Second Intifada, which broadcast Israeli atrocities across the world, became a major element of Al-Qaeda's success. Al-Qaeda leaders regularly issued numerous statements declaring the obligation of all Muslims to wage Jihad to liberate Palestine. Bin Laden constantly asserted that America's security will be jeopardized because of its role in undermining the safety of Palestinians.

In an interview given to Tayseer Allouni in 21 October 2001, bin Laden stated:

"Jihad is a duty to liberate Al-Aqsa, and to help the powerless in Palestine, Iraq and Lebanon and in every Muslim country. There is no doubt that the liberation of the Arabian Peninsula from infidels is a duty as well. ...Last year’s blessed intifada helped us to push more for the Palestinian issue. This push helps the other cause. Attacking America helps the cause of Palestine and vice versa... All of a sudden, Bush and Blair declared, “The time has come to establish an independent state for Palestine.” Throughout the past years the time hasn’t come, until after these attacks, for the establishment of the Palestinian state. They only understand the language of attacks and killings."

=== Sanctions against Iraq ===
On 6 August 1990, four days after the Iraqi invasion of Kuwait, the United Nations Security Council (UNSC) adopted Resolution 661, which imposed economic sanctions on Iraq, providing for a trade embargo, excluding medical supplies

and "in humanitarian circumstances" foodstuffs, the import of which was tightly regulated. After the end of the Gulf War and after the Iraqi withdrawal from Kuwait, the sanctions were linked to removal of weapons of mass destruction by Resolution 687.

In the 1998 fatwa, al-Qaeda identified the Iraq sanctions as a reason to kill Americans:

despite the great devastation inflicted on the Iraqi people by the crusader-Zionist alliance, and despite the huge number of those killed, which has exceeded 1 million ... despite all this, the Americans are once again trying to repeat the horrific massacres, as though they are not content with the protracted blockade imposed after the ferocious war or the fragmentation and devastation. ... On that basis, and in compliance with Allah's order, we issue the following fatwa to all Muslims: The ruling to kill the Americans and their allies—civilians and military—is an individual duty for every Muslim ...

In the 2004 Osama bin Laden video, bin Laden calls the sanctions "the greatest mass slaughter of children mankind has ever known".

=== Presence of U.S. troops in Saudi Arabia ===
Following the end of the Gulf War, the U.S. maintained a presence of 5,000 troops stationed in Saudi Arabia. One of the responsibilities of that force was Operation Southern Watch, which enforced the no-fly zones over southern Iraq set up after 1991, and the country's oil exports through the shipping lanes of the Persian Gulf are protected by the US Fifth Fleet, based in Bahrain.

Since Saudi Arabia houses the holiest sites in Islam (Mecca and Medina), many Muslims were upset at the permanent military presence. Bin Laden was furious. Before the Gulf War commenced, bin Laden tried to persuade Saudi defense minister Prince Sultan that Saudi Arabia can defend itself with the help of Afghan Arabs, but his ideas were not seriously entertained. In 1992, after bin Laden failed to convince Saudi interior minister Prince Nayef to remove the American presence, he called the Prince a traitor to Islam, prompting King Fahd to declare him persona non grata. Bin Laden then called for Muslims to overthrow the Saudi government, foreshadowing several terrorist attacks in Saudi Arabia in the years to come. The continued presence of US troops after the Gulf War in Saudi Arabia was one of the stated motivations behind the September 11th attacks and the Khobar Towers bombing. Further, the date chosen for the 1998 United States embassy bombings (August 7) was eight years to the day that American troops were sent to Saudi Arabia. Bin Laden interpreted narrations attributed to Muhammad as banning the "permanent presence of infidels in Arabia".

In 1996, by then based in Afghanistan, bin Laden issued a fatwa declaring war on the United States and calling for American troops to get out of Saudi Arabia. In the 1998 fatwa, Al-Qaeda wrote: "for over seven years the United States has been occupying the lands of Islam in the holiest of places, the Arabian Peninsula, plundering its riches, dictating to its rulers, humiliating its people, terrorizing its neighbors, and turning its bases in the Peninsula into a spearhead through which to fight the neighboring Muslim peoples." In the December 1999 interview with Rahimullah Yusufzai, bin Laden said he felt that Americans were "too near to Mecca" and considered this a provocation to the entire Muslim world.

=== Environmental destruction ===
In Letter to the American People, bin Laden criticized the United States for having some of the highest rates of greenhouse gas emissions in the world, as well as its failure to ratify the Kyoto Protocol:

You have destroyed nature with your industrial waste and gases more than any other nation in history. Despite this, you refuse to sign the Kyoto agreement so that you can secure the profit of your greedy companies and industries.

Ayman al-Zawahiri said global warming reflected

how brutal and greedy the Western Crusader world is, with America at its top

Bin Laden has also called for the destruction of the American economy as a way of fighting global warming.

=== American immorality ===
In the above-mentioned letter, bin Laden lamented the "immoral" behavior that had become the norm in the United States as a motivating factor in his decision to launch the attacks:

The second thing we call you to, is to stop your oppression, lies, immorality and debauchery that has spread among you. (a) We call you to be a people of manners, principles, honour, and purity; to reject the immoral acts of fornication, homosexuality, intoxicants, gambling, and trading with interest.

=== Conflict in Somalia, Chechnya, Kashmir, Lebanon and the Philippines ===
Clause 1B, 4 and 5 of Osama bin Laden's manifesto state that:

"You attacked us in Somalia; you supported the Russian atrocities against us in Chechnya, the Indian oppression against us in Kashmir, and the Jewish aggression against us in Lebanon. ... We also advise you to stop supporting Israel, and to end your support of the Indians in Kashmir, the Russians against the Chechens and to also cease supporting the Manila Government against the Muslims in Southern Philippines. ... We also advise you to pack your luggage and get out of our lands. We desire for your goodness, guidance, and righteousness, so do not force us to send you back as cargo in coffins."

=== Liberation of Muslim lands ===
America's hegemonic influence in the international political system was vehemently denounced by Al-Qaeda. Al-Qaeda leadership asserted that America became a legitimate target to be attacked due to the hostile policies of US governments; such as American support to Zionism, military aggression against countries across the Muslim World, sponsoring of oppressive regimes, American cultural imperialism, etc. Al-Qaeda sought cooperation with those countries that abstained from involvement in Muslim affairs and had no involvement in American imperialism.

In a speech released in 2004, Osama Bin Laden stated:

"free men do not forfeit their security, contrary to Bush’s claim that we hate freedom.

If so, then let him explain to us why we don’t strike for example – Sweden? And we know that freedom-haters don’t possess defiant spirits like those of the 19 – may Allah have mercy on them.

No, we fight because we are free men who don’t sleep under oppression. We want to restore freedom to our nation, just as you lay waste to our nation. So shall we lay waste to yours.

No one except a dumb thief plays with the security of others and then makes himself believe he will be secure. Whereas thinking people, when disaster strikes, make it their priority to look for its causes, in order to prevent it happening again."

== Inferred motives ==
Political analysts have inferred some motives for the attacks that were not explicitly stated by Al-Qaeda, such as globalization and a desire to provoke the United States.

Elliot Neaman stated that the connections Walt and Mearsheimer and others, including many German intellectuals, make between 9/11 and Israel are ahistorical. He argues that the Palestinians themselves have often pointed to their betrayal by one Arab leader after another since the founding of the state of Israel, and further that bin Laden is no exception, as he never showed any concern for the Palestinian cause until he came under the influence of Ayman Al-Zawahiri and decided to use the Palestinians as a means to gain the favor of militant Muslims. Al-Qaeda and Hamas continue to have a fraught relationship, and have been argued to have different goals in regard to the Israeli–Palestinian conflict.

=== Religious motivation ===
Daniel Benjamin and Steven Simon, in their book, The Age of Sacred Terror, argue that the 9/11 terrorist attacks are purely religious. They are seen as "a sacrament ... intended to restore to the universe a moral order that had been corrupted by the enemies of Islam." It is neither political nor strategic but an "act of redemption" meant to "humiliate and slaughter those who defied the hegemony of God."

Raymond Ibrahim, as a researcher at the Library of Congress, found a significant difference between Al Qaeda's messages in English directed to a Western audience and al Qaeda's Arab messages and documents directed to an Islamic audience. The Western-directed messages listed grievances as grounds for retaliation employing the "language of 'reciprocity.'" Literature for Islamic audiences contained theological motivations bereft of references to the acts of Western nations.

=== Globalization ===
Bernard Lewis is the best-known exponent of the idea of the "humiliation" of the Islamic world through globalization. In the 2004 book The Crisis of Islam: Holy War and Unholy Terror, he argues animosity toward the West is best understood with the decline of the once powerful Ottoman Empire, compounded by the import of western ideas, as seen in Arab socialism, Arab liberalism and Arab secularism.

During the past three centuries, the Islamic world has lost its dominance and its leadership, and has fallen behind both the modern West and the rapidly modernizing Orient. This widening gap poses increasingly acute problems, both practical and emotional, for which the rulers, thinkers, and rebels of Islam have not yet found effective answers.

In an essay titled "The spirit of terrorism", Jean Baudrillard described 9/11 as the first global event that "questions the very process of globalization".

=== Provocation of war with the United States ===
Some Middle East scholars—such as Michael Scott Doran and Peter Bergen—have argued that 9/11 was a strategic way to provoke America into a war that incites a pan-Islamist revolution. Doran argued that the attacks are best understood as being part of a religious conflict within the Muslim world. In an essay, Doran argued that bin Laden's followers "consider themselves an island of true believers surrounded by a sea of iniquity". Doran further argued that bin Laden hoped that US retaliation would unite the faithful against the West, sparking revolutions in Arab nations and elsewhere, and that the Osama bin Laden videos were attempting to provoke a visceral reaction in the Middle East aimed at a violent reaction by Muslim citizens to increased US involvement in their region.

Bergen argued that the attacks were part of a plan to cause the United States to increase its military and cultural presence in the Middle East, thereby forcing Muslims to confront the idea of a non-Muslim government and establish conservative Islamic governments in the region.

U.S. President George W. Bush did in fact declare a war on terror, which resulted in the temporary loss of control of Afghanistan by the Al-Qaeda-allied Taliban after fighting for two decades. Despite criticism that the Iraqi government had no involvement with the September 11 attacks, Bush declared the 2003 invasion of Iraq to be part of the war on terror. The resulting backlash and instability enabled the rise of Islamic State and the temporary creation of an Islamic caliphate holding territory in Iraq and Syria, until IS lost its territory through military defeats.

=== Research on suicide terrorism ===
Robert Pape identified 315 incidents, all but 14 of which they classified as part of 18 different campaigns. These 18 shared two elements and all but one shared a third: 1) A foreign occupation; 2) by a democracy; 3) of a different religion. Mia Bloom interviewed relatives and acquaintances of suicide terrorists. Her conclusions largely support Pape's, suggesting that it is much more difficult to get people to volunteer for a suicide mission without foreign occupation.

== See also ==
- Planning of the September 11 attacks
