= Human rights in Sweden =

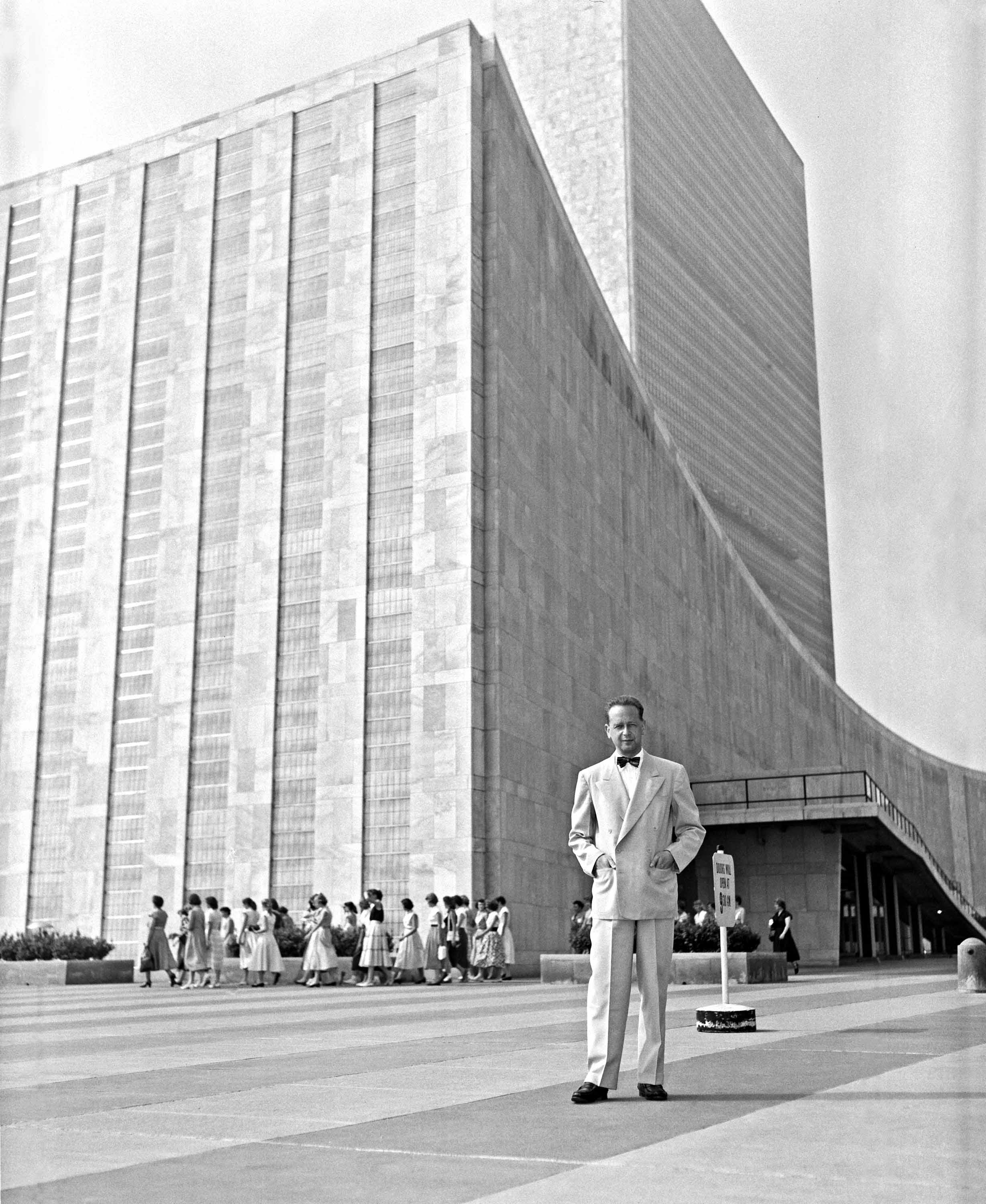
Dag Hammarskjöld, Secretary-General of the United Nations (1953), outside the UN building

Human rights in Sweden are largely protected in the country's constitution and ratified international law. The three Constitutional acts concerning human rights are Chapter 2 of the Instrument of Government, Regeringsformen, the Freedom of the Press Act, Tryckfrihetsförordningen (1949) and Fundamental Law on Freedom of Expression, Yttrandefrihetsgrundlagen (1991). Additionally, the European Convention on Human Rights has been incorporated into Swedish domestic law since 1995.

Sweden regards itself as a global leader in protecting and advocating human rights. According to the Ministry of Foreign Affairs, their position on human rights is strongly linked to democracy and the rule of law. In May 2018 an independent human rights expert of the United Nations, Obiora C. Okafor, praised Sweden's contribution to human rights internationally due to its financial support to international organisations and promoting human rights. Sweden has been regarded for its soft power diplomacy in promoting new human rights norms and challenging the international state of affairs.

Sweden is not exempt however from domestic human rights breaches. Key concerns include equality before the law, discrimination, race and social issues, the peaceful enjoyment of property and protection of asylum seekers.

== History of human rights ==
The first protection of human rights in Sweden dates back to the mid-14th century with the Konungabalk ("King's Chapter") found in the Landslagen (the General Law of the Realm). The Konungabalk was Swedish's first written constitution. It contained an oath for all succeeding monarchies in Sweden to "defend justice and truth and put down injustice, falsehood, and lawlessness" and to "keep faith with the commonality of the realm, to injure neither rich nor poor in life or limb except after trial in accordance with the law of the realm, neither to deprive any man of his goods except by due legal process". The royal oath expressed an intention to adhere to fundamental principles of human rights such as the right to trial and protection of life and limb.

This expression formed the basis of Article 16 of the Instrument of Government of 1809. Article 16 was the only proviso relating to human rights in the old Constitution. The Article reads:

"The King shall maintain and further justice and truth, prevent and forbid iniquity and injustice; he shall not deprive anyone or allow anyone to be deprived of life, honor, personal liberty or well-being, without legal trial and sentence; he shall not deprive anyone or permit anyone to be deprived of any real or personal property without due trial and judgment.... he shall not constrain or allow to be constrained the conscience of any person, but shall protect everyone in the free exercise of his religion...".

Although this is more a "general declaration of principle" it shows Sweden's early recognition of fundamental principles of human rights.

The death penalty, often considered to fundamentally abrogate human rights was practised in Sweden for a long time. During the 16th and 17th centuries 68 offences carried the death penalty, including crimes of theft, forms of adultery and religious offences against God. It wasn't until 1921 that the Riksdag formally abolished the death penalty for crimes committed in peacetime. The last execution took place in 1910.

== Key sources of rights in the Constitution ==
Sweden's legal protection of human rights developed significantly in the 20th century with the modernisation of the Constitution and the Fundamental Law on Freedom of Expression and the Freedom of Press Acts. Protecting human rights in the Constitution means that ordinary law is subordinate and may not operate if they are contrary to the rights set out. Human rights set out in Sweden's constitutional law are difficult to amend and require a more thorough process than ordinary law.

=== Chapter 2 of the Instrument of Government ===
Sweden's modern Constitution was enacted in 1974 with the inclusion of Chapter 2 named 'Fundamental rights and Freedoms'. The chapter protects four types of rights: positive freedoms, negative freedoms of opinion, physical rights and rule of law guarantees. (pg 102). Article 1 protects positive freedoms of opinion including freedom of speech, freedom of information, freedom of assembly, to name a few. Articles 2-3 protects negative freedoms of opinion such as coercion regarding political, religious, cultural, or other opinions as well as the requirement for consent for citizens to have their political opinions publicly registered. Articles 4-8 outline the physical rights to integrity and freedom of movement such as no capital punishment, no one to be subject to torture or no citizen to be refused entry to Sweden. Articles 9-11 outlines the rule of law principle that ensures each citizen is entitled to procedural guarantees. (pg. 102). Articles 12-13 protect against discrimination against people on grounds of ethnicity, gender, sexuality. Article 15 protects individuals right to private property and the right to public access of land or buildings.

=== Freedom of Press Act ===
Freedom of press is a well established right in Sweden being protected since 1766. In 1766 Sweden incorporated freedom of the press into its constitution, being the first country globally to do so. This constitutional law abolished censorship in printed publications as well as guaranteeing public access to government documents.

In 1949 the Freedom of Press Act was enacted and superseded the existing acts. Article 1 of Chapter 1 on the freedom of press outlines that it is to be "understood to mean the right of every Swedish citizen to publish written matter, without prior hindrance by a public authority or other public body, and not to be prosecuted thereafter on grounds of its content". In 2018 Sweden was ranked the second on the World Press Freedom Index.

=== Fundamental Law on Freedom of Expression ===
The Fundamental Law on Freedom of Expression 1991 is largely similar to the Freedom of Press Act set out above. Both are fundamentally protecting the right of expression and speech. Whilst freedom of speech has been protected in Sweden since 1766, it initially only extended to written published documents. There was no other mention of other types of freedom of speech until 1974. Article 1, section 1 of the Act sets out the aim of the Act to guarantee every citizen's right to publicly express themselves. The Act protects all Swedish citizens right to express themselves freely on the radio, TV, films, video and the internet. The Act also lists freedom of expression offences such as defaming someone or threatening domestic security through publication.

== Sources of human rights in international law ==
International law and conventions provide a key framework for protecting human rights in Sweden. Sweden abides and is a signatory to multiple international agreements concerning human rights. International standards for human rights found in the Universal Declaration of Human Rights, the European Convention on Human Rights, the International Covenant on Civil and Political Rights and the International Covenant on Economic, Social and Cultural Rights all influence Sweden's domestic and foreign human rights policy. The United Nations Universal Declaration of Human Rights is the foundational document for modern human rights and has largely influenced international conventions and treaties that Sweden is a signatory to.

The European Convention on Human Rights (ECHR) which was incorporated into Swedish domestic law from 1 January 1995 forms part of Sweden's protection of rights and freedoms. Sweden is a "dualist state" in its adoption of International Law such as the ECHR thereby requiring a special act by the Swedish government for treaties and conventions to take effect domestically. Since Sweden has ratified the ECHR this in practice means that the Swedish Court must interpret cases with respect to the articles of the ECHR. The convention guarantees specific right and freedoms as well as prohibiting negative freedoms and unfair practices. Some of the rights include: right to life, freedom from torture, right to a fair trial, freedom of expression and right to education.

== Human rights influencing foreign policy ==
Sweden's position on human rights has influenced their foreign policy and bilateral relations with other countries. In recent times Sweden has adjusted its relations with other states due to their domestic abrogation of human rights.

=== Saudi Arabia ===
In 2015 relations between Saudi Arabia and Sweden became tense after Margot Wallström, foreign minister of Sweden, delivered a speech to Swedish parliament stating that human rights were violated in Saudi Arabia and that she would pursue a feminist foreign policy. Saudi Arabia recalled its ambassador from Sweden and stated it would no longer issue business visas for Swedish citizens. The diplomatic affair resulted in the termination of a long-standing arms deal between Saudi Arabia and Sweden. Saudi Arabia was the third largest non-Western buyer of Swedish arms and bought approximately $37 million euros of arms in 2014. Sweden prioritised its human rights policy, in particular in regards to women's rights in their relations with Saudi Arabia.

=== Uganda ===
Another instance where Sweden has favoured human rights obligations over bilateral relations was in the early 2000s when Uganda proposed a bill that instituted the death penalty or life imprisonment for homosexuality. Sweden condemned the legislation and adjusted its foreign aid to Uganda due to the "appalling" anti-gay law. Sweden along with donors such as the World Bank, Norway and Denmark withheld aid of approximately $110 million from Uganda due to the law.

=== Russia ===
Sweden has been vocal in criticising Russia for their human rights violations. The relationship between Sweden and Russia has been termed "cool neighbours" due to past conflicts and diverging ideologies and views. Although relations between the two states is relatively stable in recent times, Sweden is critical of some of Russia's policies. According to Sweden's ambassador to Russia, Peter Ericson, Sweden has "a lot to teach Russia in terms of free speech".

== Current issues ==
According to Amnesty International some areas for concern of human rights in Sweden include discrimination, rape and sexual violence and the protection of asylum seekers.

=== Race ===
Sweden's current anti-discrimination laws have eliminated the term race, replacing the term with "ethnicity" to denote "national or ethnic origin, skin colour or other similar circumstances". Michael McEachrane in a 2018 study considers the exclusion of the term race means Sweden is not able to "recognise, monitor, or address structural racial discrimination even as a possible universal human rights issue". McEachrane outlines the nature of racial discrimination pertinent to Sweden with housing segregation of non-European backgrounds such as African or Middle Eastern living in low-income neighbourhoods.

A report released by the UN Committee on the Elimination of Racial Discrimination (CERD) in May 2018, highlighted that "racist hate speech against Afro-Swedes, Jews, Muslims and Roma" is particularly prevalent "during election campaigns, as well as in the media and on the internet". The report also stated that "The Committee is particularly concerned with reports of arson attacks against mosques and reception centres for asylum seekers."

=== Discrimination ===
Sweden has recently been criticised in a report by the UN Committee on the Elimination of Racial Discrimination (CERD) over "racist hate speech against Afro-Swedes, Jews, Muslims and Roma". In particular the report found that hate crimes remain high with an 11% increase in reported hate crimes from 2014 to 2015. In 2016 it was reported that approximately 440 hate crimes with an anti-religious motive, specifically anti-Islamic were committed.

A study by Martha F. Davis and Natasha Ryan in 2017 found that Swedish authorities had evicted more than 80 Roma settlements during 2013 and 2016. These evictions were on the grounds of poor sanitation and access to water, both considered fundamental human rights. The study concluded that Sweden had violated its human rights obligations under both European and international law. Under the International Covenant on Economic, Social and Cultural Rights access to water and sanitation are fundamental human rights for all. The 2017/2018 Amnesty Report also noted the discrimination faced by Roma citizens who are denied access to basic services such as health care and education by the State. The Roma citizens continue to be subject to harassment and prejudice from European nationals.

=== Migrants and asylum-seekers ===
Sweden's protection of asylum seekers and refugees has historically been viewed as "progressive and ambitious". They received the largest number of refugees and asylum seekers per capita in 2013 among the countries in the Organisation for Economic Co-operation and Development (OECD). Like many European countries with the 2015 Syrian refugee crisis Sweden adopted new border controls and cut benefits that refugees had previously had. Sweden introduced an amendment to their asylum seeker policies which prevented entitlement to "accommodation, subsistence allowance and special aid" for adult asylum seekers with no children and who have had their applications rejected. These emergency measures breached asylum-seekers fundamental rights such as the right to family reunification.
