= Charitable Society for Social Welfare =

Yemen-based non-governmental organization

Charitable Society for Social Welfare (CSSW)
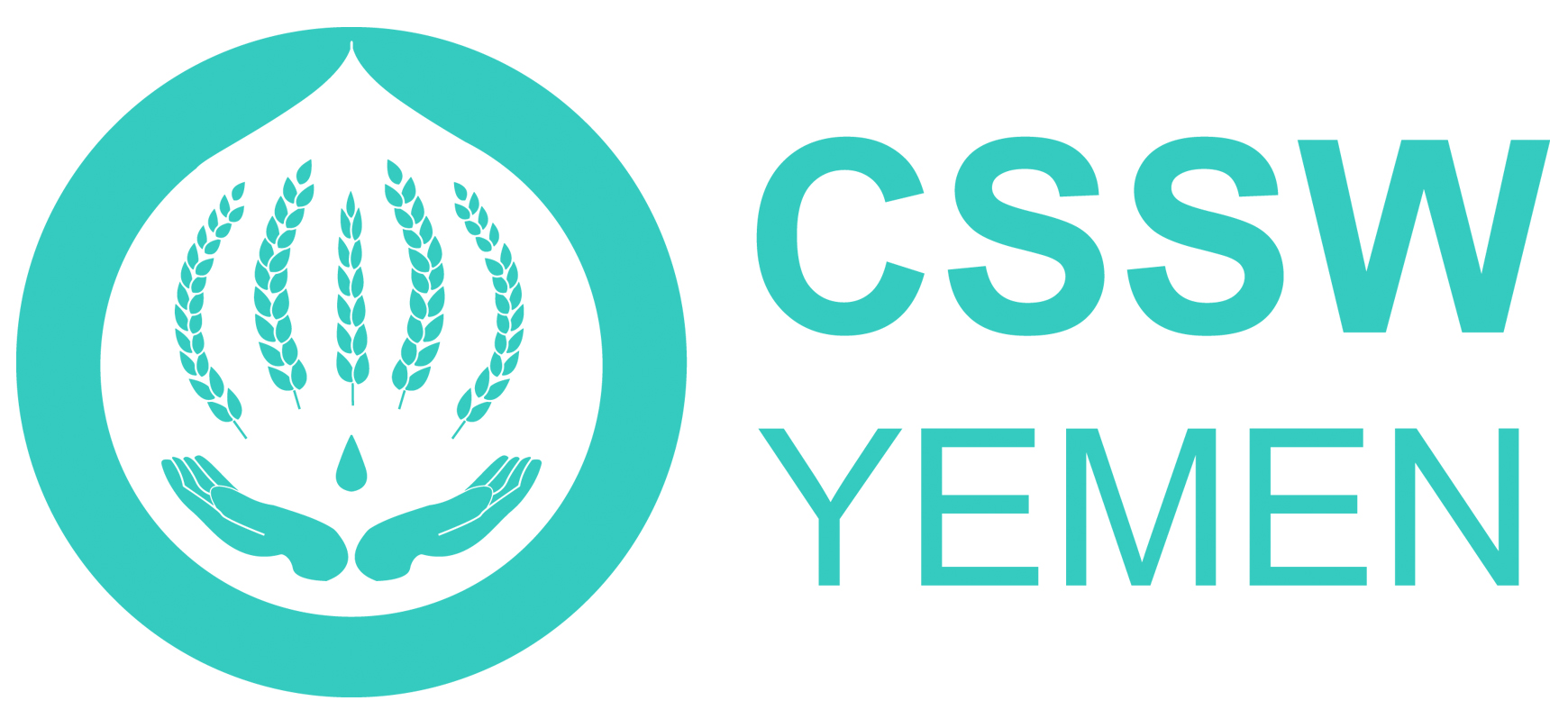
- Formation: 1990
- Founder: elite group of Yemeni volunteers and social figures
- Founded at: Yemen
- Headquarters: Yemen
- Location: Yemen
- Website: http://csswyemen.org/

The Charitable Society for Social Welfare (CSSW) is a Yemen-based non-governmental organization known for offering charitable and humanitarian services to the masses. The CSSW is accredited by the United Nations World Food Program and is also a member of the United Nations Department of Public Information (DPI-NGO).

== History ==
The Charitable Society for Social Welfare was founded as a charitable non-governmental organization in March 1990 in Yemen by an elite group of Yemeni volunteers and social figures. The CSSW formed branches and committees in the Yemen districts and governorates which numbered up to 23 branches and 26 committees by the year 2008.

In 2015, the Charitable Society for Social Welfare received the ISO 9000-2008 certificate. The CSSW is an active partner with UNICEF, the United Nations High Commissioner for Refugees (UNHCR), and the United Nations Office for the Coordination of Humanitarian Affairs (OCHA).

== Services ==
The Charitable Society for Social Welfare offers charitable programs such as emergency relief to displaced people and refugees, youth development, social care, health projects and services, woman & child development, education, community development, orphan sponsorship and other related humanitarian services.

== Controversy ==
There is a report in The Washington Post of 2008 claiming that the Charitable Society for Social Welfare (CSSW) was founded by Abdul Majeed al-Zindani, whom the US Treasury Department identified as a "Specially Designated Global Terrorist". The same report also stated that Yemeni-American cleric Anwar Awlaki served as a vice president for the CSSW in San Daigo (outside Yemen) during the 1990s.

The CSSW spokesman Jamal Al-Haddi denied the involvement of Abdul Majeed al-Zindani and Anwar Awlaki in the Yemeni CSSW. He denied that Awlaki ever worked for the Yemeni CSSW. He told INTELWIRE in an e-mail that "CSSW has no branches outside the Republic of Yemen. No official or unofficial branch of CSSW in the United States." He added that those reports might confuse with a charity that might have a similar name since the Yemeni CSSW has no other branch outside of Yemen. The CSSW spokesman Jamal Al-Haddi is making plans to reach Washington Post to correct the false information already published.

== See also ==
- Famine in Yemen
- Yemeni Crisis (2011–present)
- Human rights in Yemen
- Human rights violations during the Yemeni Civil War (2015-present)
- Houthi insurgency in Yemen
