= Khaled bin Ouda bin Mohammed al-Harbi =

Member of al-Qaeda (born 1963)

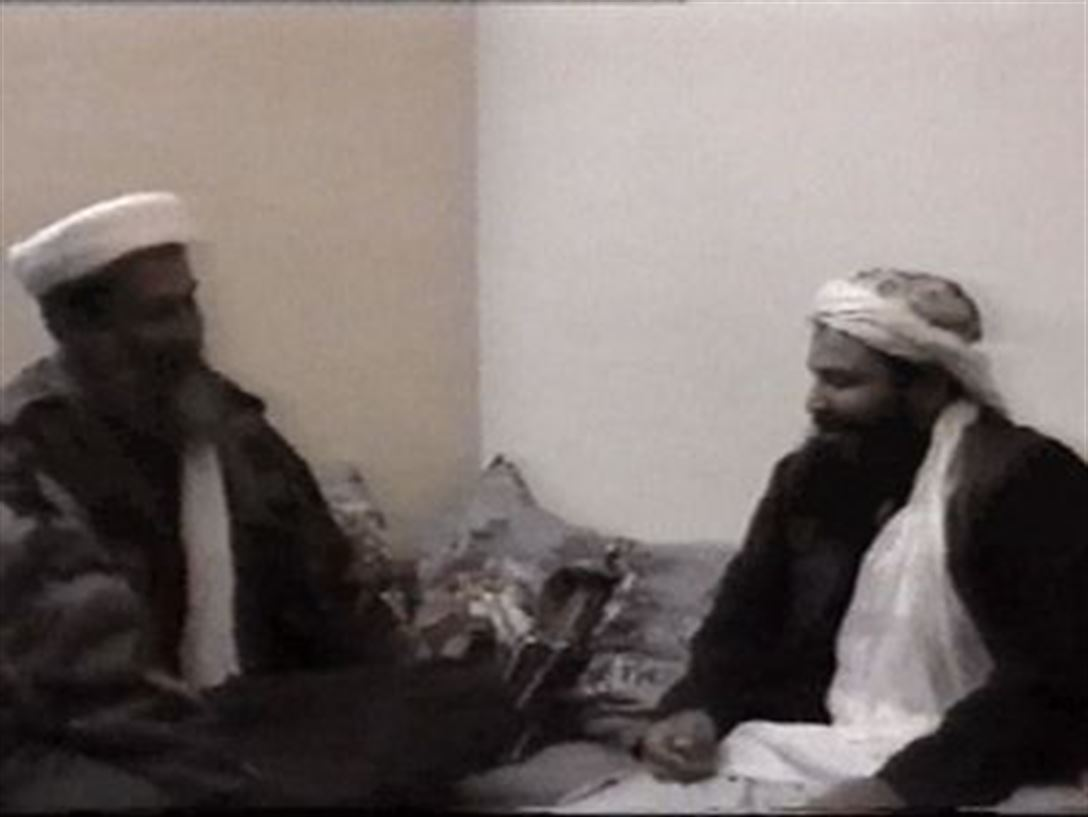
Frame grab from the Osama bin Laden videotape released by the Department of Defense on Dec. 13, 2001.

Khaled bin Ouda bin Mohammed al-Harbi, (Arabic: خالد بن عودة بن محمد الحربي, Khālid bin ‘Ūdah bin Muḥammad al-Ḥarbī) (born c. 1963) is a Saudi national who was associated with Osama bin Laden's mujahadeen group in the 1980s, and is thought to have rejoined bin Laden and al-Qaeda in the mid-1990s. Also known as Abu Suleiman al-Makki (Arabic: ابوسليمان المكي), he has a thick beard and requires the use of a wheelchair.

The BBC reports that Al-Harbi was Ayman al-Zawahiri's son-in-law.

== Fighting for Islam ==
Al-Harbi volunteered to fight against the Soviet invaders of Afghanistan during the 1980s.

According to the website Global Terror Alert, Al-Harbi volunteered to fight in Bosnia in 1992. Al-Harbi lost the use of his legs during a skirmish in Bosnia.

== Bosnia ==
Following their successful war of liberation, in 1995, the new Republic of Bosnia and Herzegovina offered citizenship to all foreign volunteers who had fought on their behalf.

Al-Harbi settled in Bosnia until 1997, when arrest warrants were issued against him and 18 other men, alleging that they had provided a safehouse for terrorists.

Al-Harbi disappeared from the time his arrest warrant was issued and his appearance in a video taped in late 2001 where he had an extended conversation with Osama bin Laden.

== Appearance with bin Laden ==
The U.S. Department of Defense released a videotape on December 13, 2001, showing Osama bin Laden having an extended conversation with an old acquaintance about the September 11 attacks. Initially bin Laden's friend's identity was unidentified. Commentators speculated that the unknown friend was an important al Qaeda financier, because he did not rise when bin Laden entered the room. By December 16, 2001 Al Harbi had been identified.

Time magazine reported that unidentified U.S. officials described al Harbi as being "a confidant and spiritual sounding board for bin Laden," but not an al Qaeda member." Time reported that Nawaf Obaid, who they identified as a Saudi security analyst, said al-Harbi is cooperating. Obaid called al-Harbi a "very successful recruiter".

In the tape, Khaled al-Harbi states that the tape was being made at the arrangement of the brothers who support al Qaida:

"We don't want to take much of your time, but this is the arrangement of the brothers. People are now supporting us more, even those ones who did not support us in the past, support us now. I did not want to take that much of your time."

In the tape, Khaled al-Harbi states that he and those with him began wondering why they had not heard news of the attacks, and then they got the news and celebrated.

The introduction to the translation states that the tape was made in mid-November 2001 in Afghanistan. The U.S. bombing of Afghanistan began on October 7, 2001.

== Amnesty and surrender ==
Afterwards, Al-Harbi lived in hiding along the Iranian-Afghani border.

Al-Harbi surrendered himself to the Saudi Arabian embassy in Iran on July 13, 2004. His surrender was part of a one-month amnesty offer by the Saudi government on June 23, 2004. Some commentators speculated that Al-Harbi was not eligible for the amnesty, arguing that it applied only to those who committed attacks inside Saudi Arabia.

== Sources ==
- Reuters
- US Military translation of tape
- Saudi official news agency release of 12 November 2004 concerning the release of those asking for amnesty. Statement regarding extradition by Prince Naif Ibn Abdul Aziz to the Council of Ministers, July 2003.
- Date of US military bombing starting in Afghanistan:
