= September 11 elementary school visit by George W. Bush =

2001 event in U.S history

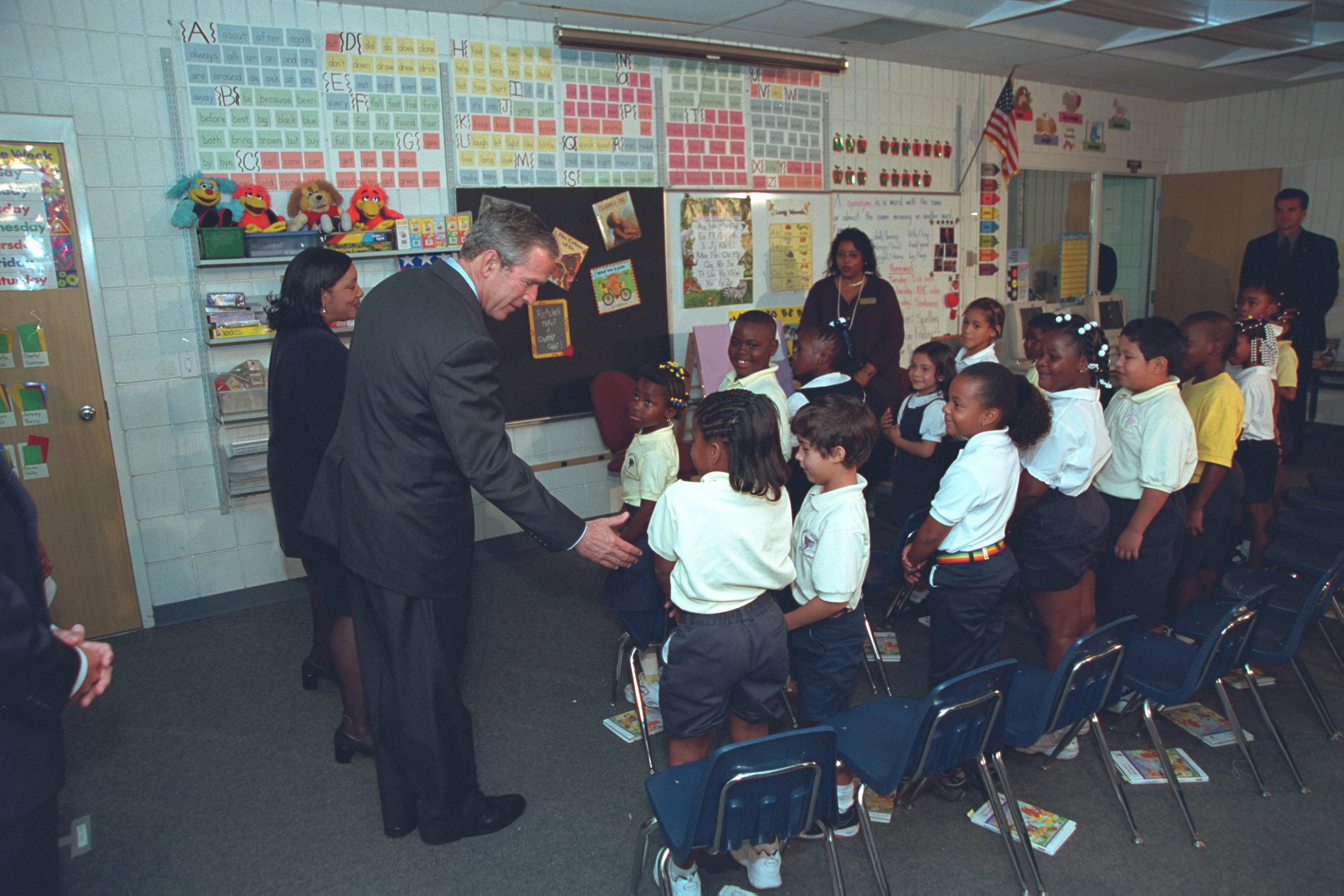
Bush meets with students

The September 11 attacks in 2001 coincided with United States president George W. Bush visiting Emma E. Booker Elementary School in Sarasota, Florida. As he was reading the book The Pet Goat by Siegfried Engelmann in front of a class of students, Bush was informed by Andrew Card that a second plane had crashed into the South Tower of the World Trade Center. Bush's decision to continue reading for seven minutes before a scheduled press conference at the school was the subject of analysis. The press conference marked Bush's first public comments on the attack.

== Background ==
He visited the school as part of an effort to promote his administration's education policy, the No Child Left Behind Act. Booker was chosen as an example of a school that was showing improvement in reading test scores using the direct instruction method, which Bush had championed as governor of Texas, and because of its socioeconomic makeup: 79 percent of students at the time were African-American, and 87 percent were from low-income families qualifying for free or reduced-price lunch.

== Report of attacks ==
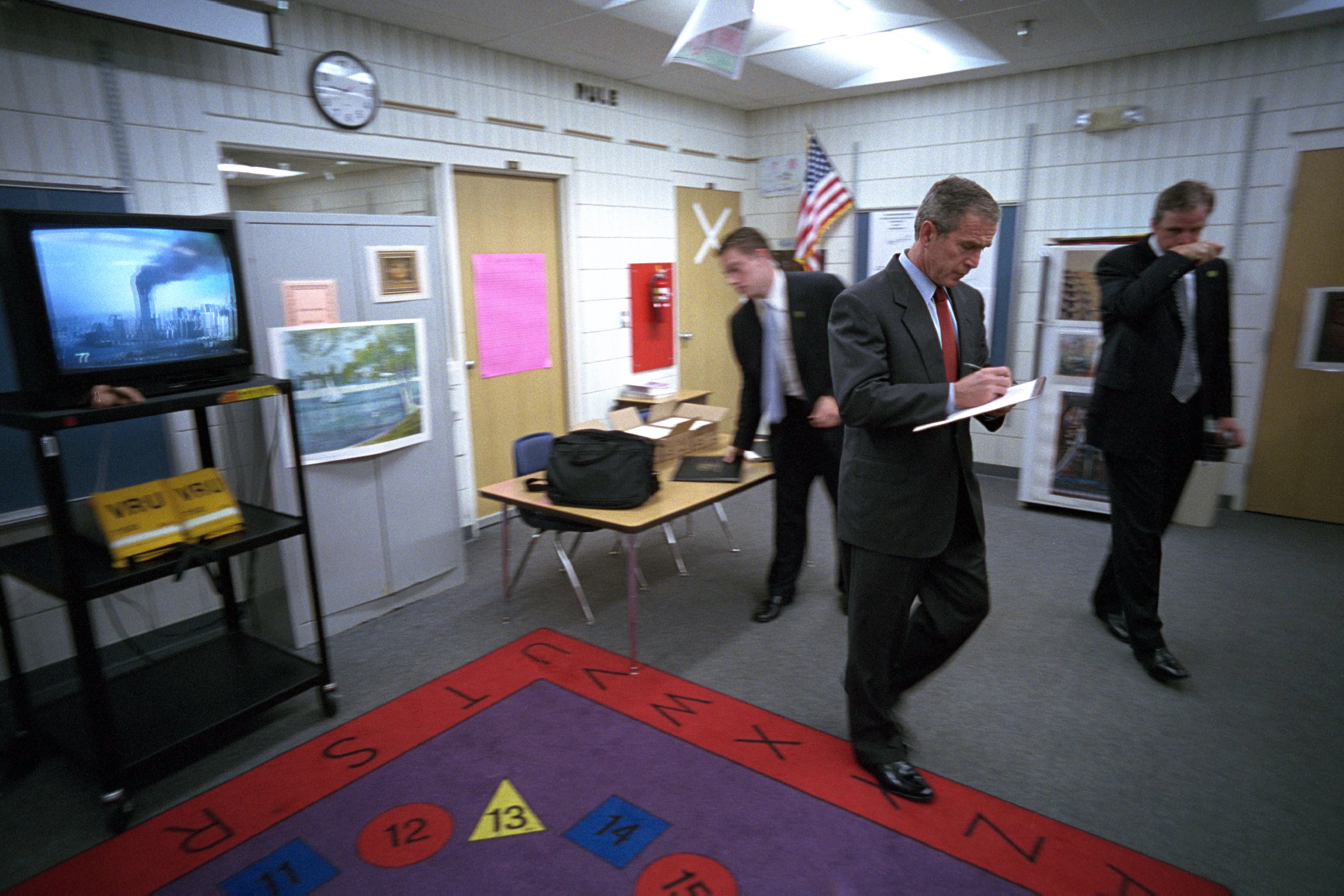
President Bush leaves his Booker elementary classroom visit and enters his staff's holding room as the television plays footage of the burning towers.

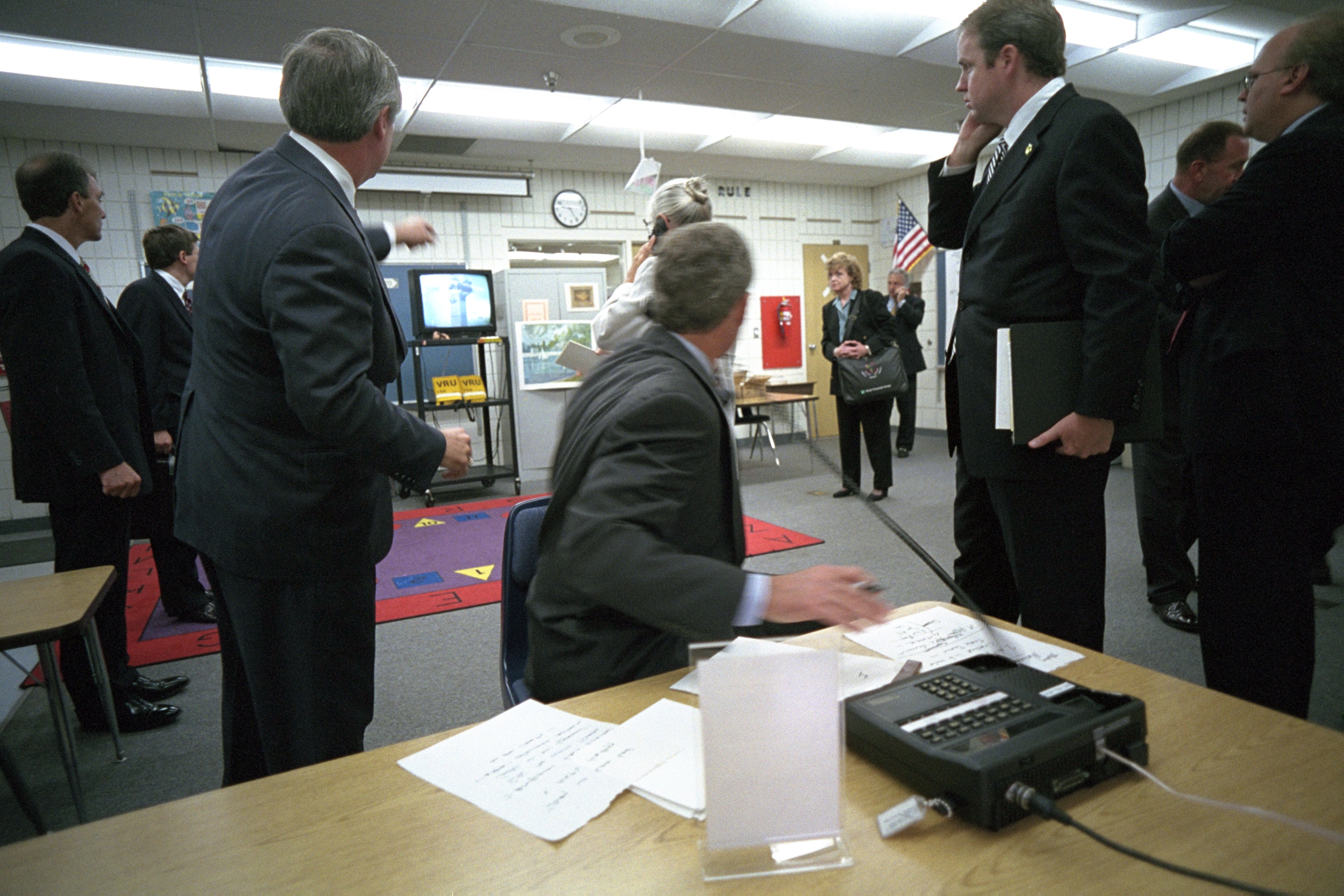
President Bush talks on a STU-III secure telephone as he watches television coverage of the attacks.

The first plane crash at the World Trade Center happened about ten minutes before the president arrived at the school. A press pool photographer heard a radio message that White House Press Secretary Ari Fleischer would be needed to answer questions about a "crash" and that a call from Condoleezza Rice was on hold. Bush entered the second-grade classroom of Sandra Kay Daniels, where he introduced the class to Secretary of Education Rod Paige and shook hands with Daniels. He and the teacher then sat down facing the seated students to read the children's story, The Pet Goat.

At about 9:05 a.m. White House Chief of Staff Andrew Card whispered into Bush's ear, "A second plane has hit the second tower. America is under attack." Bush appeared tense but remained seated for roughly seven minutes, continuing to listen as the children read the story in unison, sometimes repeating lines to meet Daniels's standards. The reading concluded with the phrase "more to come" and Bush asked the class, "What does that mean - 'more to come'?" After a student replied, he praised the students' reading skills and encouraged them to continue practicing, then excused himself and left the room.

According to Bill Sammon in Fighting Back: The War on Terrorism from Inside the White House, Ari Fleischer was in the back of the classroom holding a pad on which he had written, "Don't say anything yet." Sammon contends that, although Bush was not wearing his glasses, he was able to read this message, and it went unnoticed by the media. Sammon further stated:

Bush wondered whether he should excuse himself and retreat to the holding room, where he might be able to find out what the hell was going on. But what kind of message would that send—the president abruptly getting up and walking out on a bunch of inner-city second-graders at their moment in the national limelight?

== Press conference ==
Bush addresses reporters about the attacks

Bush addresses reporters about the attacks

Bush was scheduled for a short press conference about education in the school library after spending about 20 minutes total in the classroom. This was delayed by several minutes. When Bush appeared, he announced, "This is a difficult moment for America," and instead of the planned topic, he addressed the country for several minutes about the plane crashes and the government's immediate response. He then left the school for Sarasota-Bradenton International Airport.

== Aftermath ==
The school's library has a small memorial which includes a copy of The Pet Goat that President Bush read to Mrs. Daniels's second-grade class. A plaque commemorating the school's special link to the 9/11 attacks was subsequently installed in the school with the inscription: "This Plaque Designates the Site Where President George W. Bush Learned Of The Terrorist Attacks On Our Country."

Bush's critics, notably Michael Moore in his film Fahrenheit 9/11, have argued that Bush's continued reading the book after being notified that the attack was ongoing shows he was indecisive. A 9/11 Commission staff report titled Improvising a Homeland Defense said, "The President felt he should project strength and calm until he could better understand what was happening."

A week later, Bush wrote to the school's principal, apologizing for not being able to stay longer.

Osama bin Laden made reference to the story in an unauthenticated videotaped speech released just prior to the 2004 U.S. presidential election, stating that Bush's reading of the book had given the hijackers more than enough time to carry out the attacks. His full quote was:

But because it seemed to him that occupying himself by talking to the little girl about the goat and its butting was more important than occupying himself with the planes and their butting of the skyscrapers, we were given three times the period required to execute the operations - all praise is due to Allah.

In the years following the incident, faculty and students of the school have come to the defense of Bush's actions. Principal Gwendolyn Tose-Rigell, who died in 2007, stated, "I don't think anyone could have handled it better. What would it have served if [Bush] had jumped out of his chair and ran out of the room?"

Asked about the incident for Time shortly after bin Laden's death in 2011, two of the students from the classroom, Lazaro Dubrocq and Mariah Williams, credited Bush with keeping the classroom calm by finishing the story. Williams said, "I'll always remember watching his face turn red. He got really serious all of a sudden. But I was clueless. I was just seven. I'm just glad he didn't get up and leave because then I would have been more scared and confused." Chantal Guerrero agreed: "I think the President was trying to keep us from finding out, so we all wouldn't freak out."
