= The Pet Goat =

Children's story by Siegfried Engelmann

- Short story by Siegfried Engelmann
- Country: United States
- Language: English
- Genres: Children's literature, teaching story

Publication
- Published in: Reading Mastery: Rainbow Edition, Level 2, Storybook 1 by Engelmann and Elaine C. Bruner
- Publisher: McGraw Hill
- Publication date: January 26, 1994

"The Pet Goat" (often erroneously called "My Pet Goat") is a children's story and classroom reading exercise written by American educationalist Siegfried Engelmann. It was published in a 1994 basal reader. The story, about a girl's pet goat who has a habit of eating objects, is designed to teach students about words with the letter E.

The story is notable for being read by U.S. president George W. Bush at a school in Florida during the September 11 attacks in 2001. While he read it and listened to a classroom of children read it aloud, he was discreetly informed of the crash of United Airlines Flight 175 in New York City, which confirmed that the prior crash of American Airlines Flight 11 in the city was deliberate. Bush quietly waited seven minutes for the students to finish before responding to the unfolding crisis. His wait has gained notoriety in the retrospective assessment of his response to 9/11.

== Story ==
"The Pet Goat", a children's story, was written as a grade-school-level classroom reading exercise by Siegfried Engelmann. It was included in the basal reader Reading Mastery: Rainbow Edition, Level 2, Storybook 1. Written by Engelmann and Elaine C. Bruner, the reader was published on paperback by McGraw Hill on January 26, 1994. It was written in accordance with the direct instruction (DI) teaching method. Engelmann and other educationalists at the University of Illinois Urbana-Champaign in the 1960s developed the method, which is to teach a fact to students by directly demonstrating it, instead of stating it in the abstract; DI's underlying philosophy is that students most easily understand and quickly memorize a fact this way. Starting in the 1970s, Engelmann composed more than a thousand reading exercises that used DI.

"The Pet Goat" was designed to teach students about words with the letter E, mostly how inserting an E into one of two otherwise identical words gives them separate meanings, such as with cans and canes. In accordance with DI, Reading Mastery stories for lower grade levels, including "The Pet Goat", are printed with unusual typographical quirks; certain letters are modified in ways that are supposed to directly demonstrate their linguistic functions. None of the letters in "The Pet Goat", except for the letter and word I, are capitalized, as DI advocates for children to use I as a base for understanding capitalization before learning any other capitalized words. Diacritics are also marked over the o in goat, to help students understand the word phonetically, as it is a long vowel. Therefore, the silent a next to it is in smaller print, making gōat; The Baltimore Sun writes that children should view the a as saying, "Don't worry so much about me. Worry about my neighbor".

The story tells of a girl's pet goat; her parents want it to leave because it has a habit of eating objects, pairs of objects described by words which are differentiated by an E:

"he ate cans and he ate canes. he ate pans and he ate panes. he even ate capes and caps."

The girl's parents allow the goat to stay after he foils a robbery of the family's house by hitting his head on the intruder, who becomes "sore" (note the E).

== September 11 attacks ==
On the morning of al-Qaeda's September 11, 2001 terrorist attacks against the U.S., president George W. Bush went to Emma E. Booker Elementary School in Sarasota, Florida, to promote his proposed education reform bill, No Child Left Behind. Upon arriving at the school, he was briefed that American Airlines Flight 11 had crashed into 1 World Trade Center, one of the "Twin Towers" of the original World Trade Center complex in New York City, along with 2 World Trade Center. Bush was told that the flight was probably a small propeller plane.

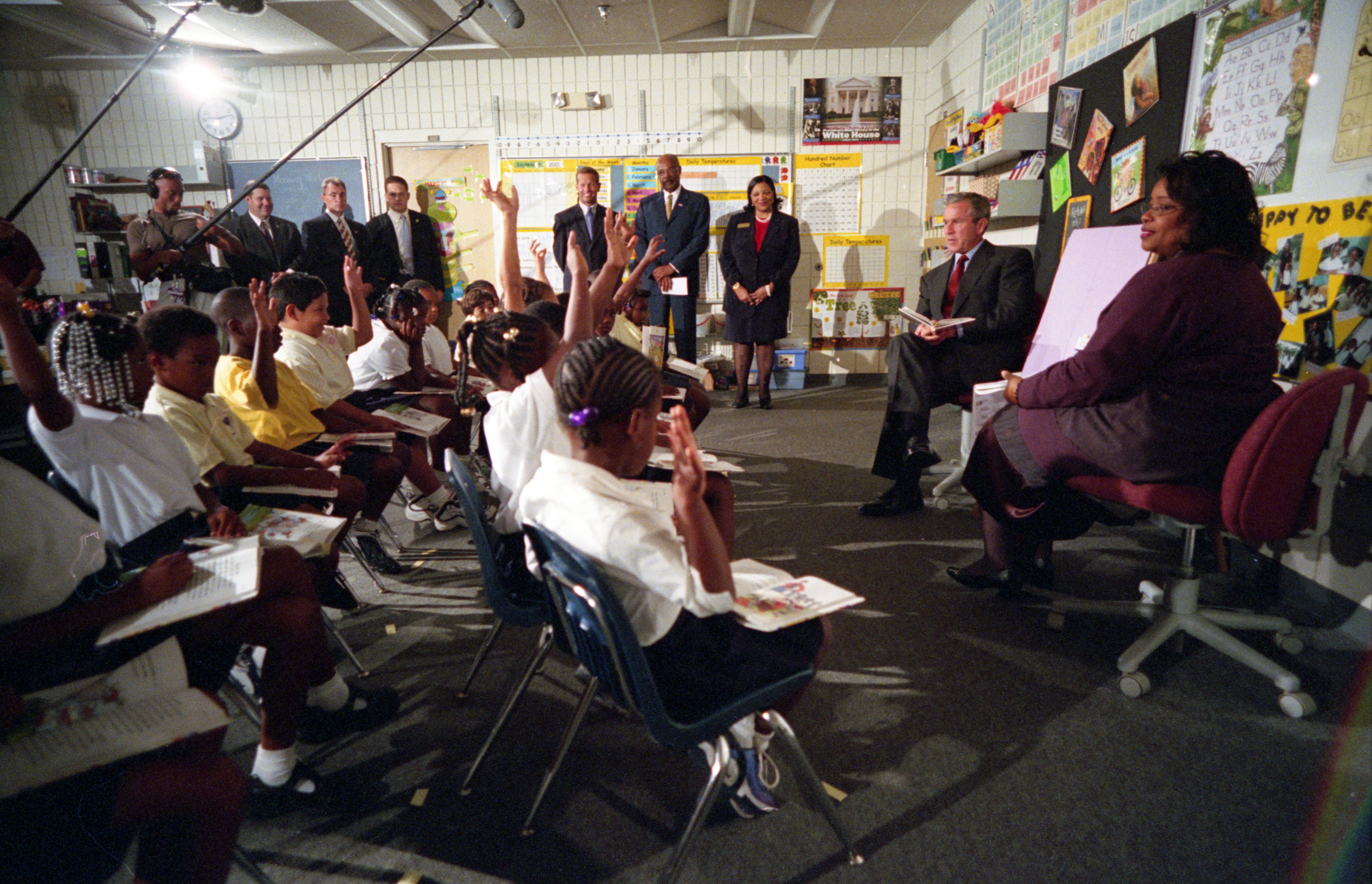
George W. Bush (second from right) reading "The Pet Goat" at Emma E. Booker Elementary School on September 11, 2001

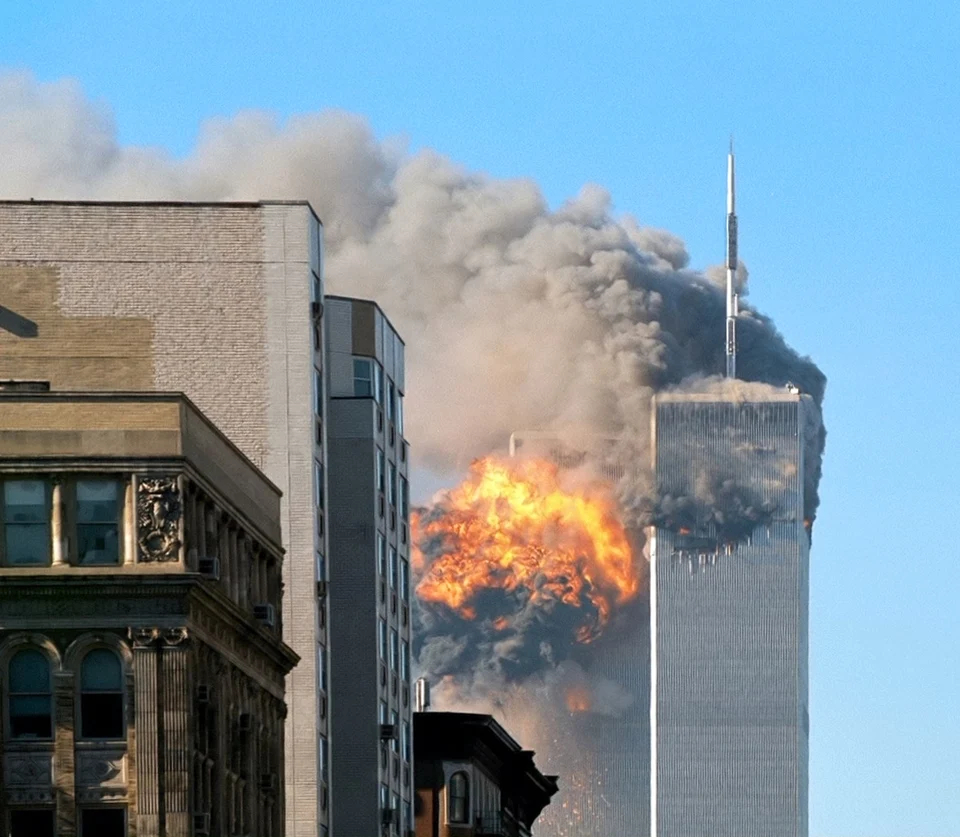
United Airlines Flight 175 crashing into 2 World Trade Center in New York City

Bush went into a second grade classroom, and sat in front of the students, their teacher Kay Daniels, and reporters. He read "The Pet Goat" as the students read it aloud. Partway through, at 9:03 a.m. EST, United Airlines Flight 175 crashed into 2 World Trade Center. Two minutes later, White House Chief of Staff Andrew Card walked over to Bush and whispered in his ear: "A second plane has hit the second tower. America is under attack."

For seven minutes afterwards, Bush quietly continued listening to the reading, and looked around the room. The students later recalled that his expression was initially stoic, but then "flabbergasted, shocked, [and] horrified", while his face turned red. At one point, Bush received cue-card advice from White House Press Secretary Ari Fleischer: "Don't say anything yet". After the reading exercise was finished, Bush remained in the classroom, talking with Daniels and her students. He deflected a question from a reporter about the World Trade Center crashes. He then left the classroom, where he was further briefed on the attacks.

=== Mention in Fahrenheit 9/11 ===
"The Pet Goat" first came to public attention with Michael Moore's documentary film Fahrenheit 9/11, a critique of Bush's response to the attacks, especially his decision to invade Iraq in 2003. The film premiered in May 2004, and is the third-highest grossing documentary film of all time. In an early scene, a seven-minute video of Bush listening to the "Pet Goat" reading plays in its entirety, as Moore presents the moment as Bush faltering in the face of a crisis. Moore, narrating the film, incorrectly states that the story's title is "My Pet Goat".

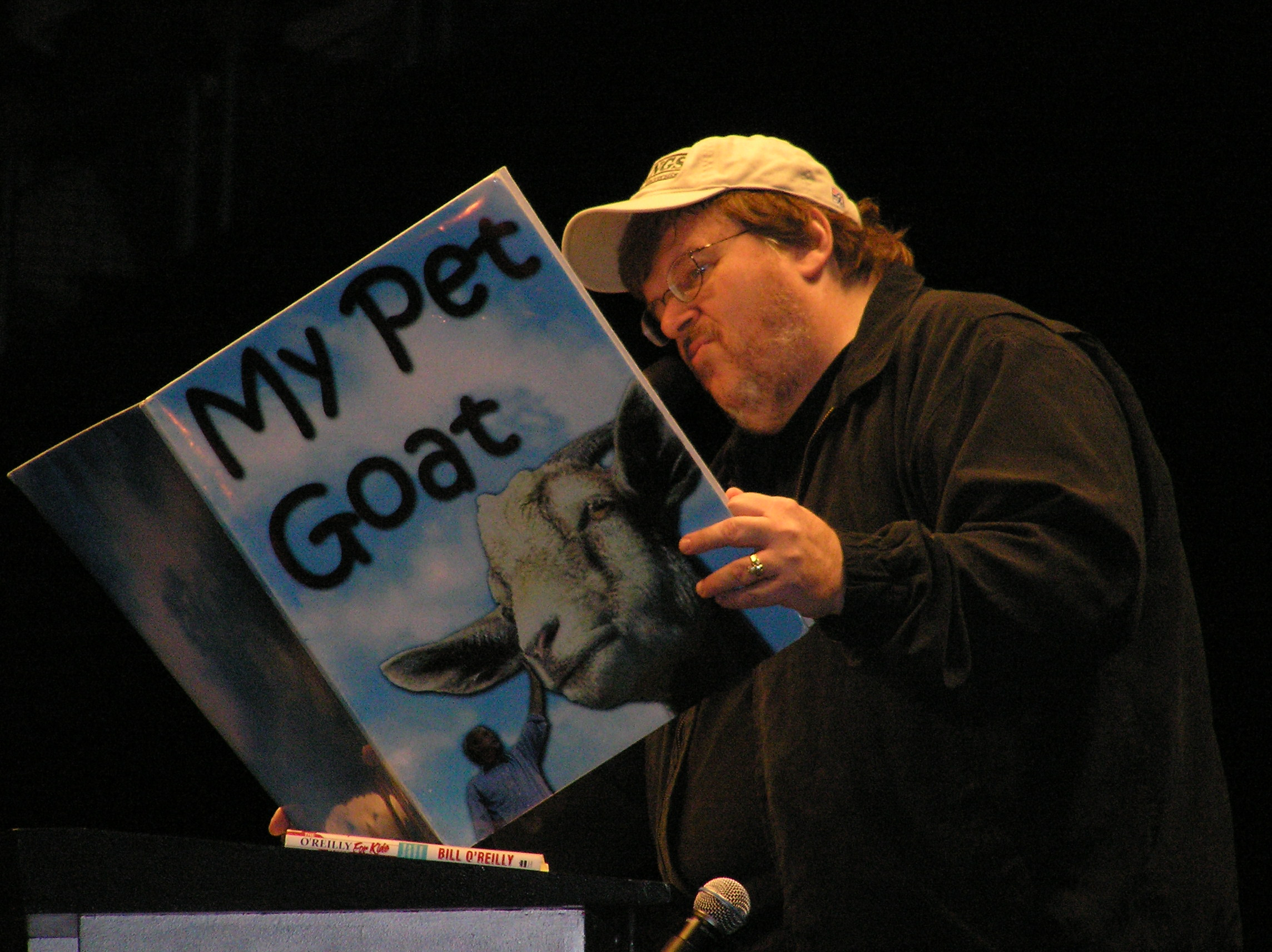
Michael Moore, who brought "The Pet Goat" to public attention, joking about Bush's reaction to the attacks

The New Yorker described Bush "staring blankly into space" as the most memorable segment of Fahrenheit 9/11. In July 2004, The Wall Street Journal wrote that, "The Pet Goat" quickly became "one of the most famous stories in America". Soon after the film's release, blogger Peter Smith researched the story's correct name, and its origin as a reading exercise by Engelmann. Smith stated that "it's fascinating that anyone would even be interested in something like" his story.

The 2005 Golden Raspberry Awards, honoring the worst elements of cinema from 2004, referenced Fahrenheit 9/11 when it awarded "George W. Bush and either Condoleeza Rice or his pet goat" the award for Worst Screen Combo.

=== Reaction on Bush's wait ===
Many of Bush's supporters responded to Fahrenheit 9/11 by arguing that there was nothing for him to do but wait for more information, as to not alarm the students. The 9/11 Commission wrote about Bush's decision:

The President told us his instinct was to project calm, not to have the country see an excited reaction at a moment of crisis. The national press corps was standing behind the children in the classroom; he saw their phones and pagers start to ring. The President felt he should project strength and calm until he could better understand what was happening.

Booker Elementary's principal, Gwendolyn Tose-Rigell, believed Bush's claimed reasoning was sound, "I don't think anyone could have handled it better. What would it have served if [Bush] had jumped out of his chair and ran out of the room?", as did Daniels's students in general.

In October 2004, a video recording of Osama bin Laden, then-leader of al-Qaeda, giving a statement to the American public was released. In it, he implies that the wait helped the hijackers who were still alive to carry out their plan.

It never occurred to us that the commander-in-chief of the United States Armed Forces would abandon 50,000 of his citizens in the Twin Towers (Note: Media estimates placed 17,400 people in the towers when Flight 11 crashed.) to face those great horrors alone, the time when they most needed him. [As Bush] seemed to [decide that] occupying himself by talking to the little girl about the goat and its butting was more important than occupying himself with the planes and their butting of the skyscrapers, we were given three times the period required to execute the operations—all praise is due to God.

In actuality, American Airlines Flight 77 had already been hijacked when Andrew Card spoke to Bush at 09:05. The last plane to be hijacked was United Airlines Flight 93, at 09:28; it failed to reach the hijackers' target, instead crashing in a field in Pennsylvania after its other occupants tried to retrieve the cockpit.

== Legacy ==
The book that Bush read in the classroom was later signed by the students and donated to the George W. Bush Presidential Center in 2012.

== Editions ==
- Engelmann, Siegfried (1995). "The Pet Goat". Reading Mastery II: Rainbow Edition, Storybook 1. Worthington, OH: SRA Macmillan/McGraw-Hill. pp. 153–155. ISBN 0026863553.
