= Project SEED =

American mathematics education program

- Founded: 1963 in Berkeley, CA
- Type: 501(c)(3) Non-profit corporation
- Region served: Nationwide
- Key people: Hamid Ebrahimi, CEO and National Director • William F. Johntz, Founder
- Website: www.projectseed.org

Project SEED is a mathematics education program which worked in urban school districts across the United States. Project SEED is a nonprofit organization that worked in partnership with school districts, universities, foundations, and corporations to teach advanced mathematics to elementary and middle school students as a supplement to their regular math instruction. Project SEED also provides professional development for classroom teachers. Founded in 1963 by William F. Johntz, its primary goal is to use mathematics to increase the educational options of low-achieving, at-risk students.

The model is to hire people with a high appreciation and love for mathematics, for example, mathematicians, engineers, and physicists to be trained to teach. They are pre-trained in the program to teach Socratically, that is, only by asking questions of the students, rarely ever making statements, and even more rarely, validating or rejecting any answers given. A unique set of hand/arm signals are taught for use by the students constantly throughout the 45 min. lesson to wave their agreement, disagreement, uncertainty, desire to ask a question, partial agreement or desire to amend, or to signal a high five to each answer given by a student to the instructor's leading question. Lessons were lively, rapid paced at times. The signals allow students to support each other, while giving the instructor a way to gauge who's understood, who hasn't got it yet, and even, who is not paying much attention. Various signals also supported classroom management. The classroom atmosphere is one of utmost respect for the inquiry process and students' participation. No student ever feels put down; when their fellow students respectfully disagreed, one is invited to state their case, and the whole class each individually would use whatever signal indicated whether they agreed or disagreed. Logic, detection of patterns, drawing a picture of the problem, and many more reasoning skills were taught. The curriculum addresses primarily algebra and some calculus—math topics with which their regular classroom teacher is often not well versed. Changing the expectations of the students' teachers, parents and family after they witnessed the students' mental abilities to understand and articulate many truths of mathematics, elevated their expectations for the students' academic abilities generating a more positive environment for their academic success.

== About ==
Project SEED is primarily a mathematics instruction program delivered to intact classes of elementary and middle school students, many from low-income backgrounds, to better prepare them for high school and college math. SEED Instruction utilized the Socratic method, in which instructors use a question-and-answer approach to guide students to the discovery of mathematical principles.

The SEED instructors are math subject specialists, with degrees in mathematics or math-based sciences, who use a variety of techniques including hand and arm signals to encourage high levels of involvement, focus and feedback from students of all achievement levels. The approach is intended to encourage active student learning, develop critical thinking, and strengthen articulation skills. The program also emphasizes assessment of student learning and adaptation of instruction to accommodate different math ability levels.

Project SEED curriculum includes topics from advanced mathematics, such as advanced algebra, pre-calculus, group theory, number theory, calculus, and geometry. SEED instruction is supplemental to the regular math program. While teaching students, Project SEED Mathematics Specialists simultaneously provide professional development training for classroom teachers, through modeling and coaching in its instructional strategies.

== History ==
Founded by math teacher and psychologist William Johntz in 1963 to improve the educational outcomes of low-income and minority students, Project SEED was last run by CEO and National Director Hamid Ebrahimi.

Project SEED started as a result of Johntz teaching a remedial math class at Berkeley High School (Berkeley, California) in 1963. Frustrated by the failure of standard remediation to improve the basic math skills of his students, he began teaching them algebra using a Socratic, question-and-answer technique. They responded well to this new material that allowed them to think conceptually about mathematics, but since they were already in high school, there was little time left for them to turn around their academic careers.

Johntz began using his free periods to try the same strategies to teach Algebra in a nearby elementary school. These fifth and sixth graders responded with enthusiasm to succeeding in the study of a high school subject. Also, this exploration of advanced concepts gave Johntz a chance to revisit and reinforce the grade-level curriculum.

Graduate students and faculty from U.C. Berkeley soon joined Johntz in other Berkeley schools. The program spread through presentations for school districts, corporations and conferences, and became a component of the Miller Mathematics Improvement Program, a program funded statewide in California from 1968 to 1970. Many of the early instructors were university faculty, graduate students, and corporate volunteers. Project SEED became a non-profit, tax-exempt corporation in Michigan in 1970 where state funding brought the program to ten different cities between 1970 and 1975. When it was founded in 1963, the name Project S.E.E.D. was an acronym for “Special Elementary Education for the Disadvantaged.” The program was reincorporated in California in 1987 as Project SEED, Inc. dropping the acronym. This was done primarily to avoid confusion with “Special Education” which had taken on a specific meaning.

Over the years Project SEED has operated in a number of cities and states with funding from state governments, federal grants, school districts, and foundations and corporations. From 1982 through 2002, a district funded program in Dallas, Texas reached tens of thousands of students and hundreds of teachers in dozens of schools. The series of longitudinal studies done by the district evaluation department during that time constitutes the most thorough examination of the effectiveness of Project SEED. Students in identified schools received a semester of Project SEED instruction for three consecutive years beginning in the second, third, or fourth grade, a program design that is now regarded as the preferred model. District teachers working in kindergarten through twelfth grade classrooms received workshops, in-class modeling, and coaching from SEED staff as a part of the Urban Systemic Initiative that was implemented in the Dallas & Detroit school districts in the mid-1990s. The Project SEED professional development program was based on this model.

Hundreds of articles about Project SEED have appeared in newspapers and magazines as well as a number of academic books about successful intervention programs. Many former SEED instructors have gone on to make further important contributions to the field of mathematics education. Currently, Project SEED operated programs in California, Michigan, Indiana, Maryland, Pennsylvania, New Jersey, North Carolina, and Washington state.

Project SEED was dissolved in the early 21st century.

== Evaluation and recognition ==
Longitudinal evaluations over a number of years in different locations with different instructors demonstrate that: Project SEED instruction has a positive impact on immediate mathematics achievement scores, Project SEED instruction has a long-term impact on mathematics achievement, and Project SEED students take more high-level mathematics courses in secondary schools.

The following organizations have recognized Project SEED as an effective mathematics education program:

- BEST (Building Engineering and Science Talent) panel
- U.S. Department of Education Program Effectiveness Panel (PEP)/ National Diffusion Network (NDN)
- Eisenhower National Clearinghouse for Mathematics and Science Education
