= Emma E. Booker =

American educator (1889−1939)

- Born: Emma Edwina Booker; 1889; Live Oak, Florida, U.S
- Died: May 16, 1939 (aged 51); Sarasota, Florida, U.S
- Resting place: Lincoln Cemetery, Gulfport, Florida
- Occupation: Educator
- Years active: 1914−1939

Emma Edwina Booker (1889 − May 16, 1939) was an African-American educator.

Booker was born in Live Oak, Florida in 1889. She moved to Sarasota, and began teaching in 1914. She began teaching at the Sarasota Grammar School, where she became the principal in 1923. During her time as principal, she raised funds for facilities, and helped expand the schools curriculum. Booker graduated with her diploma in 1935, and died in May 1939, at the age of 51. She was buried at the Lincoln Cemetery in Gulfport.

Three public schools in Sarasota were named in honor of Booker, including the Emma E. Booker Elementary School.
