= Siegfried Engelmann =

American educationalist (1931–2019)

Siegfried Englemann
- Born: November 26, 1931; Chicago, Illinois, U.S.
- Died: February 15, 2019 (aged 87); Eugene, Oregon, U.S.
- Education: University of Illinois Urbana-Champaign; University of Oregon
- Occupation: Educationalist

Siegfried "Zig" Engelmann (November 26, 1931 – February 15, 2019) was an American educationalist who co-developed the Direct Instruction (DI) teaching method. Engelmann was Professor Emeritus of Education at the University of Oregon and Director of the National Institute for Direct Instruction. He wrote more than 100 curricula using DI principles and numerous other books and articles.

== Biography ==
Siegfried Engelmann was born November 26, 1931, in Chicago, Illinois. After graduating with class honors in philosophy from University of Illinois Urbana-Champaign in 1955, he spent time in a variety of occupations, from working in exploratory oil drilling to being a science editor. While working as a marketing director in the early 1960s, Engelmann became interested with how children learn. This interest began with examining how much exposure was required for a young child to learn a motto or an advertising jingle, and what effects reinforcing presentations would have on learning rates. He began working with preschoolers, including his own children, focusing first on topics related to advertising and then on more academic content. In 1964, he left his job in advertising, and became a research associate at the Institute for Research on Exceptional Children at the University of Illinois at Champaign-Urbana, working with Carl Bereiter. In 1970, he moved to the University of Oregon in Eugene, becoming a professor in the university's College of Education.

=== The Theory of Instruction ===
In addition to developing curricula, Engelmann wrote 19 books as well as scholarly articles and other reports of his experiments on teaching and learning. In a book called The Theory of Instruction, Engelmann and Douglas Carnine summarized the theoretical basis of the Direct Instruction approach. They analyzed three components of cognitive learning: behavior, communication, and knowledge systems. They proposed that the mechanism by which humans learn involves two attributes. First, they postulated that individuals can learn any quality, defined as an irreducible feature, from examples. People are limited in this ability only by their sensory capabilities. The second attribute involves how learning occurs, and involves the notion of generalizing from examples. Learners have the capacity to develop “rules” or “understandings” about common qualities to a set of examples. As soon as learners are presented with information, they begin to formulate such rules. This is done by noting what is equivalent or “same” about the various examples that are given. Once the learner has determined what is the same about the examples of the concept or quality, generalization occurs.

=== The Bereiter-Engelmann Preschool ===
At the University of Illinois, Bereiter had a grant to accelerate the development of young children, and Engelmann worked with him on that project. In the summer of 1964, they opened a program for "culturally disadvantaged" preschoolers, which became known as the Bereiter-Engelmann Preschool. Their goal was to demonstrate the extent to which disadvantaged children could accelerate their learning beyond the performance of middle-class students, and thus have a better chance of success in school. At the preschool, Engelmann trained other teachers to work with the children. Engelmann developed scripted lessons that provided the exact wording for teachers to use, sequenced the learning in the most effective manner, and provided guidelines for checking children's responses and providing appropriate corrections and reinforcements. The scripts allowed teachers to focus on their interaction with the children.

=== Tests of Direct Instruction efficacy ===
Engelmann authored more than 100 curricular programs based on the principles that were discovered in the Bereiter-Engelmann Preschool. The first programs, written from 1968 through 1970, were called DISTAR, for Direct Instruction System for Teaching and Remediation, and were designed to teach reading, math, and language to children in kindergarten through second grade. The DISTAR materials were used in some locations that participated in Project Follow Through, the largest educational experiment in American history. Follow Through, which was sponsored by the U.S. Office of Education, began in 1968 and continued into the 1970s. The project targeted primary school children in communities with high levels of poverty. The DISTAR materials demonstrated the highest gains in the study.

In subsequent years, the original DISTAR programs were expanded from the original three levels to include six levels. These programs are currently called Reading Mastery and Connecting Math Concepts. Engelmann also developed a multilevel reading program for students beyond the primary level, including adults, who performed lower than others (Corrective Reading Decoding and Corrective Reading Comprehension), programs to teach writing and spelling (Reasoning and Writing and Spelling Mastery), and a videodisc series to teach math and science to middle school students (including Chemistry and Energy and Elementary Earth Science). Programs were also written for parents to use with their children, such as Teach Your Child to Read in 100 Easy Lessons and Give your Child a Superior Mind. Engelmann also developed computer-based programs for parents and others to teach young children reading and math skills (Funnix Beginning Reading and Funnix Beginning Math), as well as programs to teach English speaking skills to non-native English speakers at third grade or older (Direct Instruction Spoken English).

=== "The Pet Goat" children's story ===
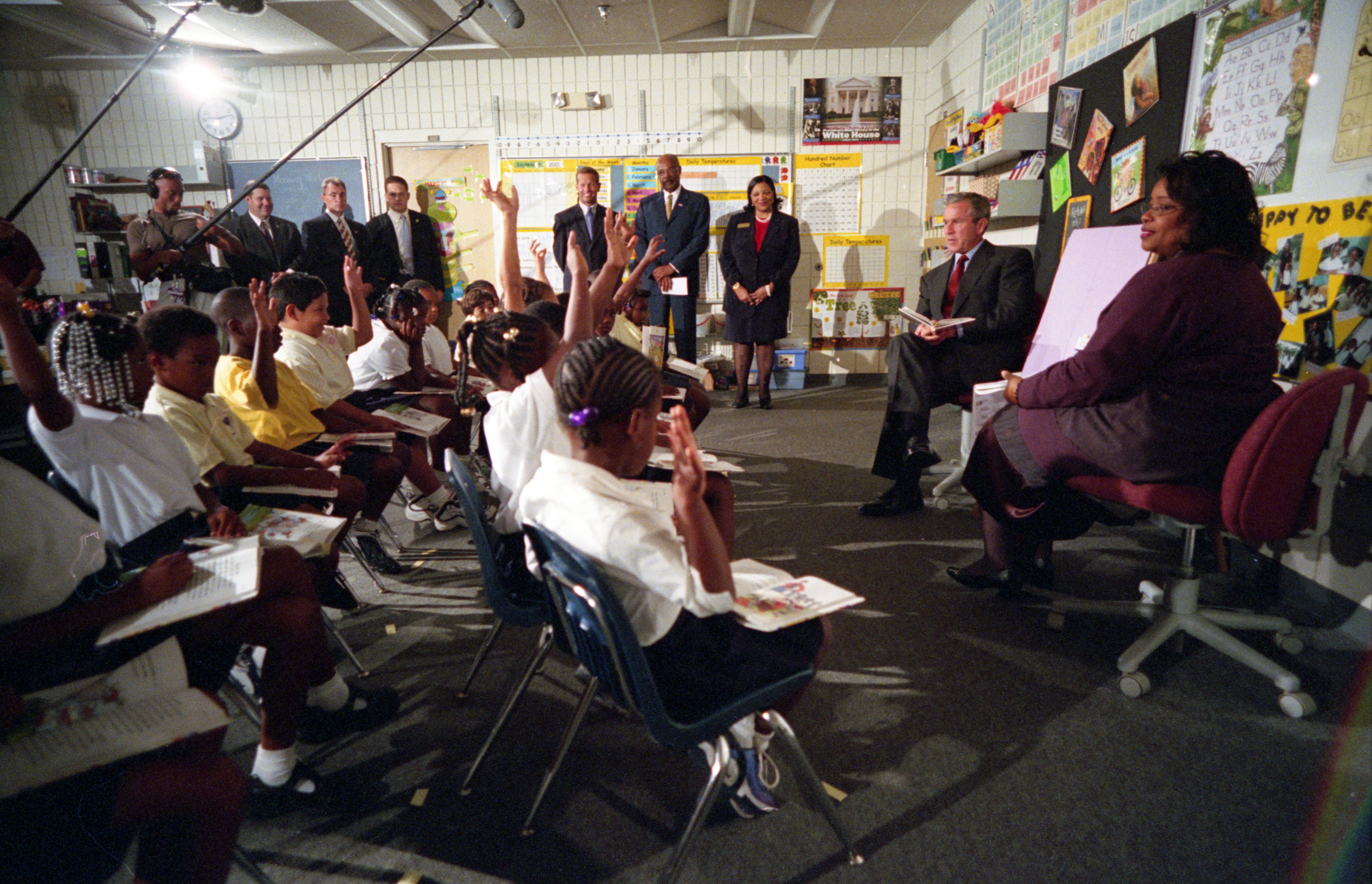
George W. Bush (second from right) reading "The Pet Goat" at Emma E. Booker Elementary School on September 11, 2001

Engelmann wrote the 1994 children's story "The Pet Goat" as a grade-school-level classroom reading exercise. It is notable for being read by U.S. president George W. Bush at a school in Florida on the morning of the September 11 attacks (9/11) in 2001, while he listened to a class of second-graders read it aloud. Partway through the reading, after being discreetly informed of the crash of United Airlines Flight 175 in New York City, Bush quietly waited seven minutes for the story to finish before responding to the unfolding crisis. His wait has gained notoriety in the retrospective assessment of his response to 9/11.

== Honors and awards ==
In 1984, Engelmann received an honorary doctorate from the Psychology Department of Western Michigan University. In 1994, he received the Fred S. Keller Award from the American Psychological Association’s Division of Experimental Analysis of Behavior. In 2000, the journal Remedial and Special Education named him as one of the 54 most influential people in the history of special education; and, in 2002, the Council of Scientific Society Presidents, awarded him the 2002 Award of Achievement in Education Research.

== Death ==
On February 15, 2019, at the age of 87, Engelmann died of heart failure at his home in Eugene.

== Selected publications ==
- Engelmann, Siegfried (1980). Direct instruction. Educational Technology Publications. ISBN 978-0-87778-142-4. OCLC 5726536.
- Engelmann, Siegfried; Haddox, Phyllis; Bruner, Elaine (2011). Teach your child to read in 100 easy lessons. New York: Touchstone. ISBN 978-0-671-63198-7. OCLC 936068799.
- Engelmann, Siegfried (1992). War against the schools' academic child abuse. Portland: Halcyon House. ISBN 978-0-89420-287-2. OCLC 28136730.
- Engelmann, Siegfried; Carnine, Douglas (2016). Theory of instruction: principles and applications. Oregon: NIFDI Press. ISBN 978-1-939851-25-3. OCLC 1033604830.
- Engelmann, Siegfried; Engelmann, Therese (1981). Give your child a superior mind: a program for the preschool child. Cornerstone Library. ISBN 978-0-346-12532-2. OCLC 7172363.
- Engelmann, Siegfried (1997). Preventing failure in the primary grades. Association for Direct Instruction. ISBN 978-1-880183-61-8. OCLC 42879639.
- Engelmann, Siegfried (2007). Teaching needy kids in our backward system: 42 years of trying. ADI Press. ISBN 978-1-880183-00-7. OCLC 228301914.
- Engelmann, Siegfried; Steely, Donald G (2004). Inferred functions of performance and learning. Lawrence Erlbaum Associates. ISBN 978-1-4106-0960-1. OCLC 53975202.

== See also ==
- Direct instruction
- Behaviorism (philosophy of education)
- Science Research Associates
