= Scripted teaching =

Commercial reading programs

Scripted teaching or scripted instruction refers to commercial reading programs that have highly structured lessons, often with specific time allotments for teaching specific skills, and often word-for-word scripts of what the teacher is to say. Scripted instruction has often been advocated for schools where teachers have had inadequate teacher training and is also seen as way to standardize the quality of instruction. Critics say that such programs stifle teachers' creativity, undermine teachers' expertise, and fail to provide for the diverse needs of many classrooms. Advocates see it as the easiest way to provide teachers with the essential elements of effective reading instruction. Scripted instruction has also been applied to preparation of lessons in many other subject matter areas.

One widely used program using scripts is the Success for All reading instruction program.

Scripted instruction has been an integral part of the direct instruction (DI) approach to education which has been presented as a structured alternative to the constructionist approaches to teaching such as discovery learning.

There is extensive additional information on scripted teaching available on the International Reading Association website.

== Overview ==
=== Meaning ===
Scripted teaching can be traced back to 1888 where Samuel and Adeline Monroe published text for teachers that provided them with scripts for teaching reading readiness, phonics, and oral reading. In this method of teaching, the teacher is expected to read the lesson scripts verbatim. It is a form of direct instruction meant to guide teachers in order to sustain consistency in teaching strategies by teachers. It also aims to eliminate the risk of poor instruction by inexperienced teachers. Its purpose of strict adherence to the script is targeted more towards schools with low standardized test scores so that the concepts being taught can be delivered in a consistent manner, in hopes that the students will understand the lessons more clearly. This strategy is becoming more prevalent in US school districts, as well as schools throughout the world.

=== Goal ===
Many school districts are moving to scripted teaching programs with a goal of improving students' standardized test scores. With more pressure being put on teachers to have their students achieve higher standardized test scores, teachers are looking to use scripted teaching programs as an aid to teach these concepts to their students, hoping that it will be a more effective way of teaching. Scripts designed for teaching curriculum are not meant to eliminate the amount of teacher preparation, but are to be used as a scaffold for teachers to adhere to the topics and skills required of students. When used properly, scripted teaching programs are used as a tool that teachers can add and subtract parts of the structure to create a learning environment that facilitates appropriate instruction individualized to the needs of their learners. Hundreds of schools could be using the same scripted curriculum; however, if used appropriately, their lessons will be carried out differently as a reflection of the diverse learners in their respective classrooms. The goal is that all of the students will learn the same concepts and be able to use the knowledge that comes from the scripted lessons.

=== Behaviorist learning theory ===
Scripted teaching is influenced by behaviorist learning theory. It uses repetition as a way to reinforce the concepts that students are learning. Some scripted learning programs (for example, Language for Learning) go through an error correction process when a student answers a question incorrectly. Using a behavioral approach to teaching and learning, micro skills such as spelling are practiced meticulously and are perfected before moving onto macro skills such as writing or reading longer passages.

=== Critiques ===
A common critique about scripted teaching presumes that any person can come into a classroom and teach a lesson if they follow the script. However, proponents of scripted teaching maintain that just like an actor brings life to a script, a teacher can and must use their own personality to breathe life into the teaching script. Scripted teaching programs are meant to be used as a support for teachers to help them develop their own teaching style and confidence in their teaching ability. Teachers who are first introduced to scripted teaching tend to feel that they are being held back from using their own knowledge when they are required to instruct using an external script. This also leads to teachers feeling that they cannot respond when a student answers with an unusual answer; however, teachers who are experienced in scripted teaching find a way to build on the unusual answers and find their way back to the script. Teachers who have learned that reading written language involves accuracy, fluency, self-monitoring, and comprehension are more successful at scripted teaching. A final critique is that scripted teaching de-professionalizes teachers, stifling their creative potential.
