= Direct instruction =

Teaching by lecture or demonstration

Direct instruction (DI) is the explicit teaching of a skill set using lectures or demonstrations of the material to students. A particular subset, denoted by capitalization as Direct Instruction, refers to the approach developed by Siegfried Engelmann and Wesley C. Becker that was first implemented in the 1960s. DI teaches by explicit instruction, in contrast to exploratory models such as inquiry-based learning. DI includes tutorials, participatory laboratory classes, discussions, recitation, seminars, workshops, observation, active learning, practicum, or internships. The model incorporates the "I do" (instructor), "We do" (instructor and student/s), "You do" (student practices on their own with instructor monitoring) approach.

DI relies on a systematic, scripted curriculum delivered by highly trained instructors. On the premise that all students can learn and all teachers successfully teach if given effective training in specific techniques, teachers may be evaluated based on measurable student learning.

In some special education programs, teachers use direct instruction in resource rooms to assist with homework completion and academic remediation.

== History ==
DISTAR was a specific direct instruction model developed by Siegfried Engelmann and Wesley C. Becker. Engelmann and Becker sought to identify teaching methods that would accelerate the progress of historically disadvantaged elementary school students.

Direct Instruction was first formally implemented at a preschool program for children from impoverished backgrounds at the University of Illinois in the mid-1960s. The team implementing DI consisted of Siegfried Engelmann, Carl Bereiter, and Jean Osborn. The program incorporated short instructional periods, usually 20 to 30 minutes a day. The instructional periods focused on language, reading, and math. The children showed vast improvement, which led to further development of the approach. When further developing DI, they applied the same principles to create a formal instructional program that included language, reading, and math. They called the formal program DISTAR, for Direct Instruction System for Teaching Arithmetic and Reading. In the late 1960s, Project Follow Through included DI as one of the programs used to compare outcomes across more than 20 educational interventions in high-poverty communities. The study was a large, government-funded study implemented over a multi-year period. DI was implemented at 19 sites with varied demographic and geographic characteristics. The results indicated that DI was the only intervention with significantly positive impacts on all measured outcomes.

Direct Instruction has been effectively delivered to students with learning disabilities through peers. Peer delivery offers teachers new ways to use the curriculum. The approach has also been examined as a model to help students in a resource room complete homework, build executive functioning skills, and improve teacher efficiency.

== Success for All ==
Another popular direct instruction approach is the Success for All program, which uses scripted teaching to teach elementary children phonics and intensive reading. The teacher's script is carefully written into the program. Johns Hopkins University professor Robert Slavin designed the program in the mid-1980s for failing schools in Baltimore, Maryland. The program requires a dedicated 90 minutes of reading instruction in which the teacher must follow a pre-ordained lesson plan, with every minute filled with scripted instruction and specific activities designed to teach reading. Not all experts supported this instructional approach. For instance, Jonathan Kozol criticised the program in his book The Shame of the Nation for being excessively dogmatic, utilitarian, and authoritarian.

English Language Learners (ELL) students could also benefit from Direct Instruction. The program for teaching English to Spanish-speaking students begins with teachers giving instruction in Spanish and then gradually incorporating more and more English into the directions. As with all Direct Instruction programs, the Direct Instruction groups are kept small and commingled with others of similar skill levels.

== Effectiveness ==
Features that make Direct Instruction effective:

- Only 10% of the material is new, while the remaining 90% is a review of previously taught content.
- Students are grouped based on their skill levels, which are determined by assessments administered before commencing the Direct Instruction program.
- The emphasis is on the student's pace by either slowing down, reteaching, or accelerating through easily understood material.
- The external validity of Direct Instruction has been tested, and the program is research-based.

Debates about the efficacy of DI raged before the final results of Project Follow Through were published; however, substantial empirical research supports its effectiveness. A meta-analysis published by Adams and Engelmann (1996), a chief architect of the DI program, finds a "mean effect size average per study...(as) more than .75, which confirms that the overall effect is substantial." A 2018 meta-analysis by Stockard et al. found an average effect on test scores of approximately 0.6 standard deviations.

In some special education programs, it is used in a resource room with small groups of students. Some research has shown there is benefit with this model.

Direct Instruction is used with students from every population segment (with regard to poverty, culture, and race). In Project Follow Through, the DI model was ranked first in achievement for poor students, students who were not poor, urban students, rural students, African American students, Hispanic students, and Native American students. Today, many of the Bureau of Indian Affairs' highest-performing schools use Direct Instruction materials. The Baltimore Curriculum Project has many schools with Free and Reduced Lunch Rates above 75% that serve student populations more than 90% African American. These schools have shown strong achievement gains using Direct Instruction.

Meta-analysis of 85 single-subject design studies comparing direct instruction to other teaching strategies found the effects to be substantial for students with learning disabilities; however, when qualified by IQ and reading levels, Strategy Instruction (SI) had better effects for the high IQ group. For the low-IQ discrepancy groups, higher effect sizes were yielded for a Combined DI and SI Model when compared to all competing models. With the exception of handwriting, DI's effects were all above 0.8 (i.e., reading and mathematics).

John Hattie's Visible Learning: A Synthesis of Over 800 Meta-Analyses Relating to Achievement (2009) summarizes the results of four meta-analyses that examined Direct Instruction. These analyses incorporated 304 studies of over 42,000 students. Across all of these students, the average effect size was 0.59 and was significantly larger than those of any other curriculum Hattie studied.

Direct Instruction is recognized as one of two effective models of comprehensive school reform and, in many cases, can be integrated into a tiered model system to address students with developing problems. The findings from Project Follow Through, conducted in a variety of selected communities throughout the United States, suggest that Direct Instruction is the most effective model for teaching academic skills and for affective outcomes (e.g. self-esteem) of children. Recent large-scale studies (1997–2003), such as the Baltimore Curriculum Project, show that it is possible to help schools that are in the lowest twenty percentile with respect to academic achievement steadily improve until they are performing well above average. In some cases, school achievement improved from the 16th percentile to above the 90th percentile.

== Criticism ==
Teachers often express animosity towards the methods of Direct Instruction, claiming that it limits both student and teacher creativity in the classroom due to its strict, scripted procedures.

Another common concern with Direct Instruction programs is their expense. Many argue that the current expense of implementing Direct Instruction programs is too high and unreasonable for low SES schools and school districts. The prices of student workbooks are about $20 while teacher workbook prices can range from $180–$232 as seen on the McGraw Hill website which is the main distributor of Direct Instruction materials (NIFDI, 2005).

One three-year study of methods of teaching reading showed that highly scripted, teacher-directed methods of teaching reading were not as effective as traditional methods that allowed a more flexible approach. Urban teachers, in particular, expressed great concern over the DI's lack of sensitivity to issues of poverty, culture, and race.

The former president of the National Science Teachers Association (NSTA), Anne Tweed, questioned whether direct instruction was the most effective science teaching strategy. In the December 15, 2004 NSTA Reports she concluded that "direct instruction alone cannot replace the in-depth experience with science concepts that inquiry-based strategies provide."

Some critics also see DI as a betrayal of the humanistic, egalitarian foundations of adult public education. It is seen as a "canned" or "teacher proof" curriculum deliverable via unskilled teachers.

In Australia, where DI has been used in schools among several remote Indigenous Australians communities in Queensland, DI has been criticized for its high cost in return for only modest improvements in literacy and numeracy levels, as well as its US-centric theme which is alien to indigenous Australian cultures.

== See also ==
- Behaviorism (philosophy of education)
- Instructional design
- Passive learning
