= Emma E. Booker Elementary School =

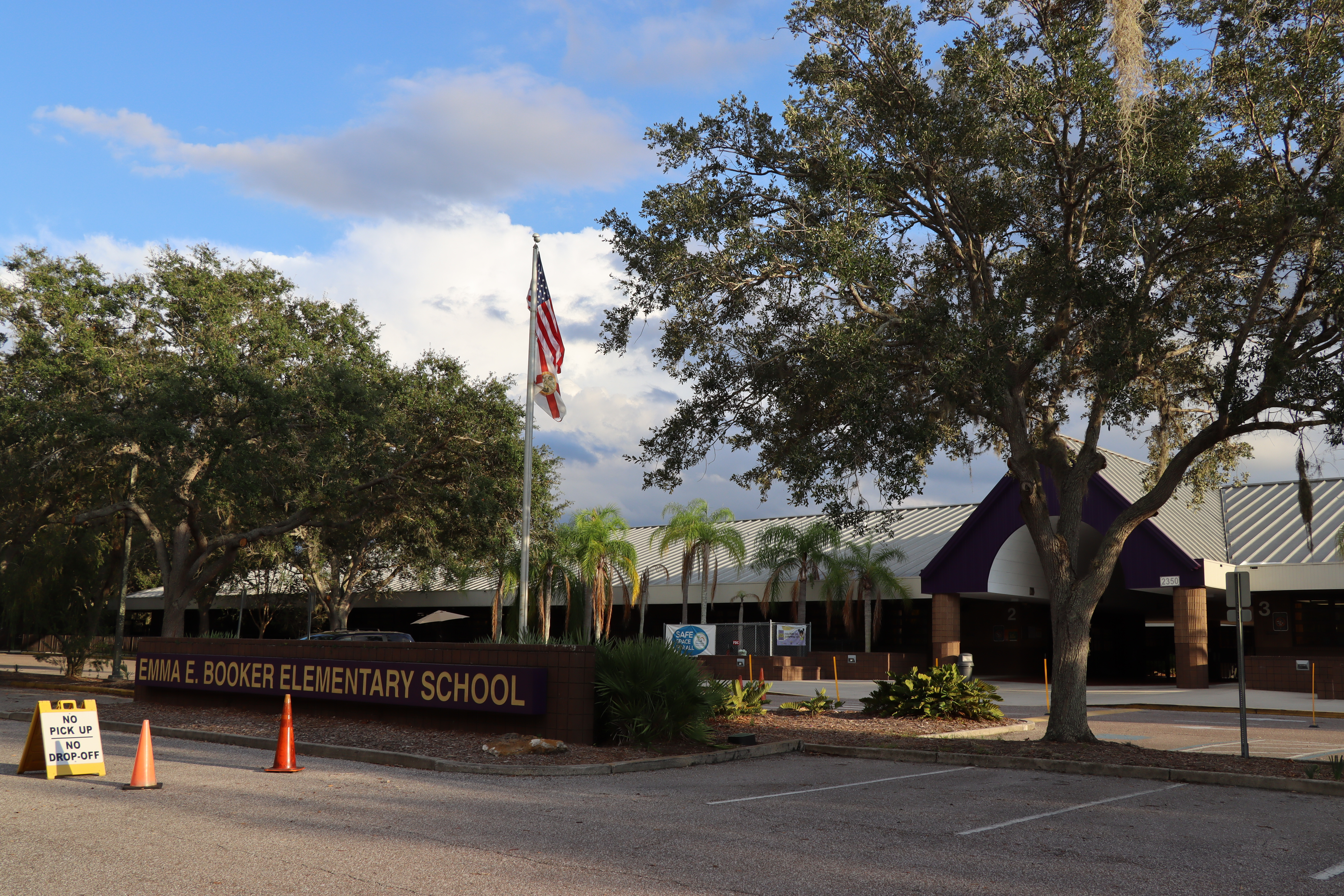
- Emma E. Booker Elementary School in 2023

Location
- 2350 Dr. Martin Luther King Jr. Way; Sarasota, Florida 34234; United States; 27°21′28.04″N 82°31′25.12″W

Information
- Type: Public elementary school
- Motto: High expectations for all
- Opened: 1989; 37 years ago
- School district: Sarasota County Public Schools
- NCES School ID: 120168002904
- Principal: Marya Annicelli
- Teaching staff: 32.00 (on an FTE basis)
- Grades: Pre-K–5
- Enrollment: 451 (2024-25)
- Student to teacher ratio: 14.09
- Colors: Purple, gold
- Mascot: Tornado
- Website: www.sarasotacountyschools.net/o/emmaebooker

Emma E. Booker Elementary School is a public elementary school in Sarasota, Florida, United States, which opened in the fall of 1989. It is one of the Booker Schools, with a middle and high school of the same name nearby. It is a part of Sarasota County Schools.

The school became widely known for the visit by George W. Bush during the September 11 attacks.

== The Booker Schools ==
The Booker Schools were named for Emma E. Booker, an African American educator who began teaching at Sarasota County's first black school, Sarasota Grammar School, in 1918. By 1923, she had become principal of the school, which had no physical building and used rented halls for classes. Her students "sat at desks made of orange crates, learning from hand-me-down books discarded from the white schools."

Julius Rosenwald, a part-owner of Sears, established the Rosenwald Fund in 1917 to help underfunded African-American schools in the South. Within the first few years of its establishment, the Fund provided funding for the first African-American school in Sarasota, located on 7th Street and Lemon Avenue, after Emma Booker had made the school's plight known. The school (with four classrooms and an auditorium) opened with eight grades during the 1924–25 school year. On opening day, Emma Booker led her teachers and students from the Knights of Pythias rental hall to the new school. After 20 years of summer college attendance, she attained her bachelor's degree in 1937.

The Booker Schools were named in her honor in the late 1930s and were expanded to include a high school. When Emma E. Booker Elementary School was named in her honor, a newspaper editorial said:

Emma Booker persevered, personally encouraging students, underwriting their continued education and pressuring intransigent administrators to provide for blacks the same educational opportunities available to whites.

From 1939 to 1989, the Booker Schools shared a campus at Myrtle Street and Orange Avenue in Sarasota. In 1966, 12 years after the U.S. Supreme Court case Brown vs. Board of Education ended school segregation, there were 36 African-American students enrolled in the all-white high schools. In 1967, the Sarasota County School Board closed Booker High School, forcing students to attend Sarasota High School. The Newtown community protested the Booker school closure by boycotting the public schools and sending their children to "freedom schools" at local churches. Booker High School reopened in 1970 and became a Visual and Performing Arts magnet school. The Booker School campus was split into the Emma E. Booker Elementary School in 1989 and the Booker Middle School in 2003, with the Booker High School refurbished at the previous location.

George Bush received the news regarding 9/11 from White House Chief of Staff Andrew Card at Emma E. Booker Elementary School. He gave his first public statement at 9:30 a.m. before boarding Air Force One to Barksdale Air Force Base in Louisiana.
