= National Diffusion Network =

The National Diffusion Network (United States, 1974–1995) was the first federally sponsored effort to identify and spread to America's schools innovative education programs. The program was created administratively by the then-Office of Education in the Department of Health, Education, and Welfare as an effort to make use of the best of the Elementary and Secondary Education Act Title III education innovations. The NDN operated successfully, at a congressionally approved appropriations level varying between $8-million and $14-million per year, for 20 years. It, like several other small programs then administered by the U.S. Department of Education was eliminated by having its funding stopped by the 105th Congress, under the implementation of a cost-cutting initiative sponsored by new Speaker of the House Newt Gingrich, called the Contract with America.

There were several components of the National Diffusion Network. The most central were Developer Demonstrators, projects of educational innovations that had been rigorously reviewed and validated by a federal panel, the Joint Dissemination Review Panel. The Developer Demonstration projects, or DDs, offered their professional development and other services to schools and school districts who had need for the specific education reform and improvement innovations. A catalog listing all the DDs available to schools, Educational Programs That Work was published yearly by Sopris West, a private contractor, and distributed nationally. A second critical component of the NDN were its state facilitators (SFs). There was at least one SF grantee in each of the 50 states, plus designated agencies in the District of Columbia and U.S. Territories. The role of the SFs was to act as liaisons between schools in their state that had need for assistance and the NDN-approved Developer Demonstrators. Matches were called "program adoptions."

The principal congressional sponsors of the NDN were Rep. Dale Kildee (D-MI) and Sen. Claiborne Pell (D-RI), both of whom sponsored legislation to maintain and extend the work of the program throughout the nation. When the National Diffusion Network's funding was threatened by David Stockman, OMB director in 1981, during the first year of the Ronald Reagan administration, personnel staffing National Diffusion Network projects formed a professional advocacy group, the National Dissemination Association. The association was led by Max McConkey, artist, later the chief policy officer at WestEd and board president of Knowledge Alliance. NDA appealed to both Education Secretary Terrel Bell and to Congressman Kildee and Senator Pell. The three collaborated in a successful effort to save the Network.

While the National Diffusion Network officially ended in 1995, many of its innovative programs continue to be disseminated to schools throughout the nation, contributing to the resources used for the implementation of the ESEA reauthorization of 2001—the No Child Left Behind Act.
