= Manhunt for Osama bin Laden =

Search for leader of al-Qaeda

Osama bin Laden, the founder and former leader of al-Qaeda, went into hiding following the start of the war in Afghanistan in order to avoid capture by the United States for his role in the September 11 attacks, and having been on the FBI Ten Most Wanted Fugitives list since 1999. After evading capture at the Battle of Tora Bora in December 2001, his whereabouts became unclear, and various rumours about his health, continued role in al-Qaeda, and location were circulated. Bin Laden also released several video and audio recordings during this time.

In the decade following his disappearance, there were many attempts made by the United States government to locate bin Laden. In December 2009, U.S. Army general Stanley McChrystal said that bin Laden would need to be "captured or killed" in order for the U.S. to "finally defeat al-Qaeda".

American intelligence officials discovered the whereabouts of Osama bin Laden by tracking one of his couriers. Information was collected from Guantanamo Bay detainees, who gave intelligence officers the courier's pseudonym as Abu Ahmed al-Kuwaiti. In 2009, U.S. officials discovered that al-Kuwaiti lived in Abbottābad, Pakistan. Central Intelligence Agency (CIA) paramilitary operatives located al-Kuwaiti in August 2010 and followed him back to the Abbottabad compound, which led them to speculate it was bin Laden's location.

On May 1, 2011, United States Navy SEALs of the Naval Special Warfare Development Group (DEVGRU) carried out an assault on the compound on orders from U.S. president Barack Obama. During a 40-minute raid, bin Laden was killed in the pre-dawn hours of May 2 by one bullet above the left eye and another to the chest. The team extracted bin Laden's body (which was subsequently buried at sea) as well as computer hard drives, documents, and other material.

== Bin Laden's whereabouts in the mid-2000s ==
New information of bin Laden's location had been emerging since his death and the arrest of his wives. On the day of the 9/11 attacks, bin Laden was at the Khaldan terrorist training camp near Khost, which he left during the night with several Al Qaeda and Taliban operatives after sending his wives and children away across the Durand Line into Pakistan to hide out. Bin Laden arrived the following morning in Kandahar and lived in a Taliban-controlled safe house from September 12 to October 6, 2001. Shortly after the US-led war in Afghanistan began, bin Laden traveled from Kandahar to Kabul where he lived in another Taliban safe house until November 12 when he was believed to have traveled to Jalalabad where he spent at least five days in another safe house. From Jalalabad, he traveled to the Tora Bora region in the White Mountains where he hid out from November 17 to December 16. He is believed to have crossed the border into Pakistan sometime in January 2002 and spent time in various Al Qaeda safehouses in the Federally Administered Tribal Areas of Pakistan between January and April 2002.

According to one of his wives, bin Laden was reunited with his family for the first time after the 9/11 attacks in the second half of 2002 in Peshawar, the capital city of the Tribal Areas, where they lived for five months in another safe house. After this, in September 2002, bin Laden took his family into the rural mountain areas of northwest Pakistan (and very notably, not in the tribal belt where main US attention was focused). First they stayed in the Shangla district in the Swat valley, where they stayed in two safe houses for eight to nine months. In May 2003, bin Laden and his family moved to Haripur, a small town close to Islamabad, where they stayed in a rented house for two years. In June 2005, bin Laden and his family moved to Abbottabad.

== Location and killing of Osama bin Laden ==
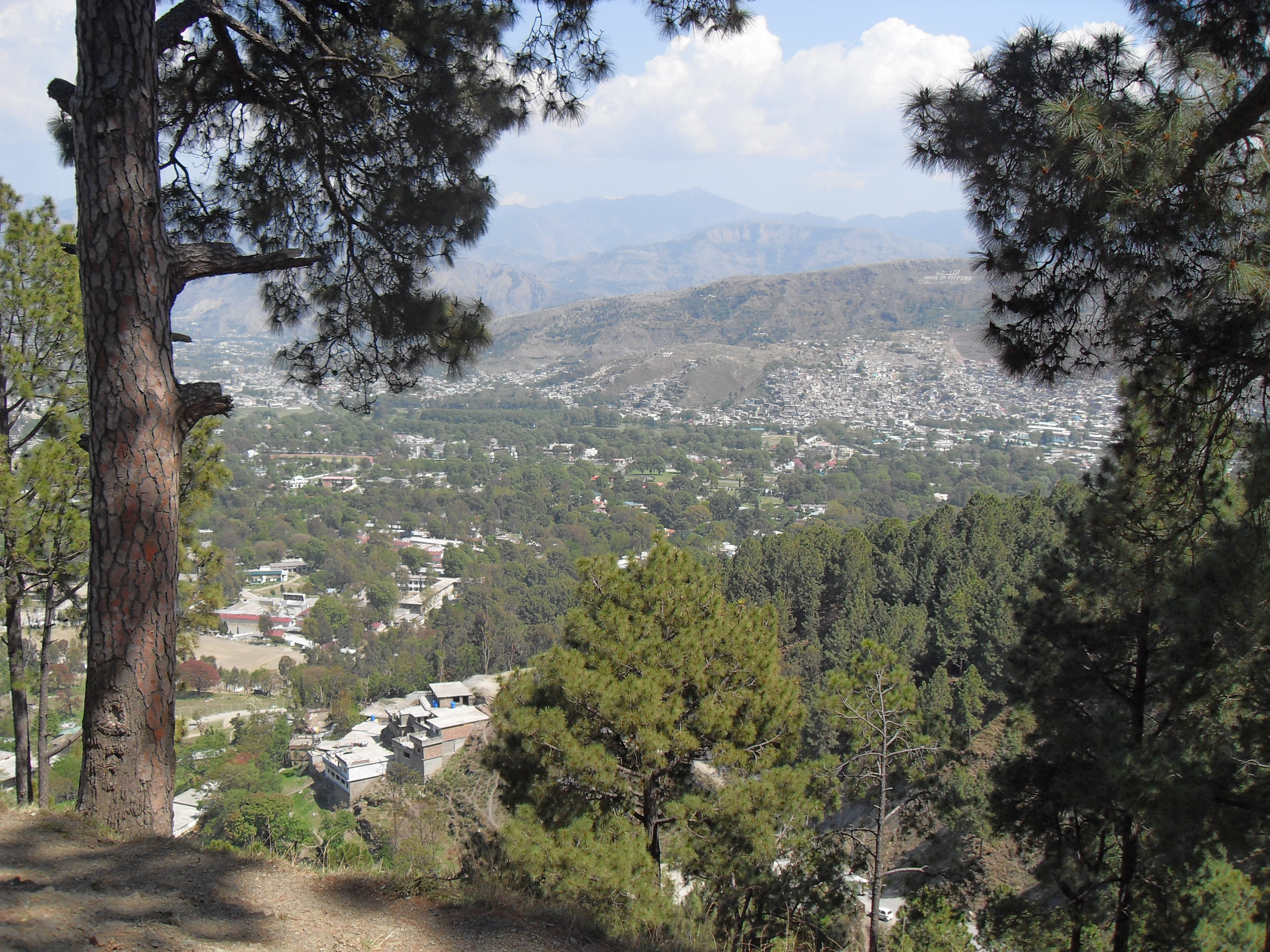
View of Abbottabad, Pakistan

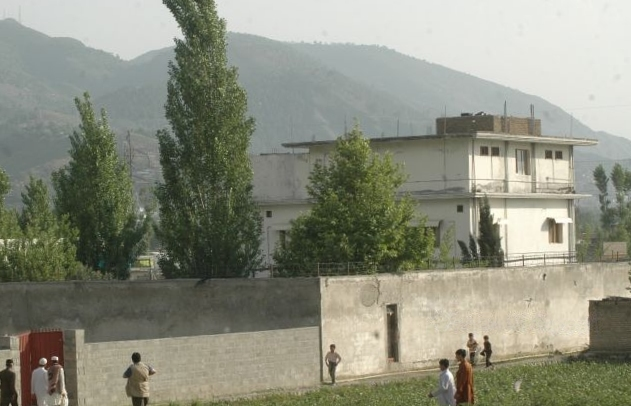
Osama bin Laden's last home, in Abbottabad.

=== Tracking ===
American intelligence officials discovered the whereabouts of Osama bin Laden by tracking one of his couriers. Information was collected from Guantánamo Bay detainees, who gave intelligence officers the courier's pseudonym as Abu Ahmed al-Kuwaiti, and said that he was a protégé of Khalid Sheikh Mohammed. In 2007, U.S. officials discovered the courier's real name and, in 2009, that he lived in Abbottabad, Pakistan. CIA paramilitary operatives located al-Kuwaiti in August 2010 and followed him back to the Abbottabad compound, which led them to speculate it was bin Laden's location.

Using satellite photos and intelligence reports, the CIA inferred the identities of the inhabitants of the compound. In September 2010, the CIA concluded that the compound was "custom built to hide someone of significance" and that bin Laden's residence there was very likely. Officials surmised that he was living there with his youngest wife.

=== Identification attempt ===
To identify the occupants of the compound, the CIA worked with doctor Shakil Afridi to organize a fake vaccination program. Nurses gained entry to the residence to vaccinate the children and extract DNA, which could be compared to a sample from his sister, who died in Boston in 2010. It is unclear if the DNA samples were ever obtained.

=== Location ===
Built between 2003 and 2005, the three-story mansion was located in a compound about 4 km (2.5 mi.) northeast of the center of Abbottabad. While the compound was assessed by US officials at a value of US$1 million, local real-estate agents assess the property value at US$250,000. On a lot about eight times the size of nearby houses, it was surrounded by 12-to-18-foot (3.7 to 5.5 m) concrete walls topped with barbed wire. There were two security gates and the third-floor balcony had a seven-foot (2.1 m) privacy wall. There was no Internet or telephone service coming into the compound. Its residents burned their trash, unlike their neighbors, who simply set it out for collection. The compound was located at 34°10′09″N 73°14′33″E, 1.3 kilometres (0.8 mi) southwest of the closest point of the sprawling Pakistan Military Academy. President Obama met with his national security advisors on March 14, 2011, in the first of five security meetings over six weeks. On April 29, at 8:20 a.m., Obama convened with National Security Advisor Thomas Donilon, Deputy National Security Advisor for Homeland Security and Counterterrorism John O. Brennan, and other security advisors in the Diplomatic Room, where he authorized a raid of the Abbottabad compound. The government of Pakistan was not informed of this decision.

=== Killing ===
Osama bin Laden was killed after being shot in the head and chest, during Operation Neptune Spear, with Geronimo as the code word for bin Laden's capture or death. The operation was a 40-minute raid by members of the United States special operations forces and Navy SEALs on his safe house in Bilal Town, Abbottabad, Pakistan. It took place on May 2, 2011, around 01:00 Pakistan Standard Time (May 1, 20:00 UTC). U.S. forces then took his body to a military base in Afghanistan for identification before burying it at sea.

Following his death new details of where he lived were learned from interrogations of his widows and surviving associates. According to Associated Press reports based on interrogations, it was determined that he had lived in five different safehouses in Pakistan. His penultimate home was located in Haripur. It was a relatively upscale house in a neighborhood that contained other upscale homes but also bordered Afghan refugee huts. He lived there for eleven months while the Abbottabad compound was being built.

== Pakistan's alleged role ==
Critics have accused Pakistan's military and security establishment of protecting bin Laden. Most believe bin Laden lived at the compound for at least six years before his death there.

On March 29, 2012, Pakistani newspaper Dawn acquired a report produced by Pakistani security officials, based on interrogation of his three surviving wives, that detailed his movements while living underground in Pakistan. Declan Walsh, writing in the New York Times, reported on speculation that Pakistan was planning to charge bin Laden's wives and adult daughters with immigration offenses, rather than simply deporting them, so they would be in prison and unable to offer details of Pakistani cooperation with bin Laden to neighboring country India and its intelligence agency RAW.

== Rumors and speculation about his whereabouts: 2001–2011 ==
Bin Laden's location and state of health were a continuing topic of speculation since his disappearance from Tora Bora. It has become clear that most of these rumors and speculation were not based on fact. First, rumors surfaced that bin Laden was killed or fatally injured during U.S. bombardments, most notably near Tora Bora, or that he died of natural causes. According to Gary Berntsen, in his 2005 book, Jawbreaker, a number of al-Qaeda detainees later confirmed that bin Laden had escaped Tora Bora into Pakistan via an eastern route through snow-covered mountains in the area of Parachinar, Pakistan. The media reported that bin Laden suffered from a kidney disorder requiring him to have access to advanced medical facilities, possibly kidney dialysis. Ayman al-Zawahiri, al-Qaeda's second-in-command and a close bin Laden associate, is a physician and may have provided medical care to bin Laden.

Between 2002 and 2011, the most common suggestion from U.S. national security officials and others was that "their best intelligence suggested that bin Laden was living along the mountainous, ungoverned border of Pakistan and Afghanistan," such as in the Federally Administered Tribal Areas (an area that includes Waziristan) or volatile regions in North-West Frontier Province (now known as Khyber Pakhtunkhwa), where an ongoing insurgency has taken place. Several experts and former officials expressed surprise when bin Laden was instead revealed to have been hiding in the urban city of Abbottabad. Less common suggestions were that bin Laden had died (either by illness or military attack), or that he was alive and living in countries other than Pakistan, such as Afghanistan or Iran.

=== 2001 ===
- Dr Amer Aziz, a Pakistani surgeon who had been traveling to Afghanistan since 1989, to treat wounded mujahideen, acknowledged he examined Osama bin Laden at a temporary clinic he set up at the University of Jalalabad, Nangarhar in November 2001. Aziz refuted the rumors that bin Laden was suffering from kidney disease, or any other chronic conditions.

=== 2004 ===
- January 23: Hassan Ghul, a courier of bin Laden is arrested by the Peshmerga in Iraqi Kurdistan after trying to cross the Iranian border.
- February 27: Iranian news agency IRNA reported that bin Laden had been caught some time earlier in Pakistan. The news was spread by Asheq Hossein, director of the state-sponsored radio station, who mentioned two sources. The first source was a reporter of the Pakistani newspaper The Nation, Shamim Shahed, who denied ever telling this to Hossein. The second source was "someone closely related to intelligence agencies and Afghan tribal elders." Both the Pentagon and a spokesperson of the Pakistani armed forces have denied the capture of bin Laden. Similar rumours have appeared from time to time since the start of U.S. military operations in Afghanistan but none have been confirmed.
- October 21: John Lehman, a member of the 9/11 Commission, reports that Osama bin Laden was indeed alive, and that the Pentagon knew exactly where he was. According to Lehman, bin Laden was living in South Waziristan in the Baluchistan Mountains of the Baluchistan region, surviving from donations from outside countries such as the United Arab Emirates and high-ranking ministers inside Saudi Arabia. "There is an American presence in the area, but we can't just send in troops," Lehman said. "If we did, we could have another Vietnam, and the United States cannot afford that right now."

=== 2005 ===
- June: Taliban commander Mullah Akhtar Mohammad Osmani tells Pakistani GEO News that bin Laden and Mullah Mohammed Omar are both alive. He does not reveal anything about bin Laden's location, stating "All I can tell you is that Osama bin Laden is alive and well."
- September 25: Pakistani ISI counterterrorism chief "Ali," whose true identity has not been publicly revealed, tells CBS News' 60 Minutes that he believes that bin Laden is hiding in Afghanistan with a small group of supporters, possibly with as few as 10 men.
- October 4: The 2005 Kashmir earthquake strikes the northeastern Pakistani area of Pakistan-administered Kashmir. In November, Senate Minority Leader Harry Reid tells television news that "I heard today that he may have died in the earthquake that they had in Pakistan."
- December 11: A letter to Abu Musab al-Zarqawi, dated December 11 and signed "Atiyah" (thought to be Atiyah Abd al-Rahman), is later intercepted and publicly reported in The Washington Post the following year. The letter indicates that bin Laden and the al-Qaeda leadership were based in the Waziristan region of Pakistan at the time. In the letter, translated by the United States military's Combating Terrorism Center at West Point, "Atiyah" instructs Zarqawi to "send messengers from your end to Waziristan so that they meet with the brothers of the leadership ... I am now on a visit to them and I am writing you this letter as I am with them..." Al-Rahman also indicates that bin Laden and al-Qaeda are "weak" and "have many of their own problems." The letter has been deemed authentic by military and counterterrorism officials.

=== 2006 ===
- January 9: Neoconservative commentator Michael Ledeen writes in a column in National Review that "according to Iranians I trust," bin Laden died of kidney failure in mid-December 2005 and was buried in Iran. Ledeen claimed that bin Laden has "spent most of his time since the destruction of al-Qaeda in Afghanistan" in Iran and wrote that "The Iranians who reported this note that this year's message in conjunction with the Muslim Hajj came from his number two, Ayman al-Zawahiri, for the first time."
- May 24: Alexis Debat of ABC News reported on rumors that bin Laden was sighted in the Ghor Province of Afghanistan. The report, on ABC News's blog, was later removed due to doubts about the credibility of Debat's reporting.
- September 21: The French newspaper L'Est Républicain publishes an article by Laid Sammari which cited a September 21 French foreign intelligence document as reporting that Saudi officials received confirmation that bin Laden died August 23 of typhoid fever in Pakistan. U.S. intelligence officials stated that the reporting was unsubstantiated and that the U.S. had received no confirmation of that report. French president Jacques Chirac stated that the report was "in no way confirmed." Members of the bin Laden family also said they heard nothing to confirm the report.

=== 2007 ===
- June: Speaking to al Jazeera, Taliban leader Mullah Bakht Mohammed stated that "Sheikh Osama bin Laden is alive and active. He's carrying out his duties. The latest proof that he is alive is that he sent me a letter of condolences after the martyrdom of my brother. He advised me to follow my brother's path." Mohammed's brother Dadullah had led military operations for the Taliban until his death in May 2007. Mohammed stated that "Sheikh Osama prefers not to be seen or meet anyone because if he makes himself available to the media maybe he will be facing danger."
- September 7: Former counter-terrorism official Richard A. Clarke speculated that bin Laden's "phony looking beard" in a recent videotaped message may mean his original beard has been shaved to help him blend into different Muslim communities. Clarke stated to ABC News that beards would stand out in southeast Asia, the Philippines, or Indonesia, and noted that "No one's thought he was there, but that is an environment where most Muslim men normally don't have beards."

=== 2008 ===
- July 12: Pakistani Interior Minister Rehman Malik, speaking in opposition to drone attacks in Pakistan, claimed to the British Sunday Times that "If Osama was in Pakistan we would know, with all the thousands of troops we have sent into the tribal areas in recent months. If he and all these four or five top people were in our area they would have been caught, the way we are searching." Malik claimed that drone strikes in Pakistan were a waste of time, stating that "according to our information Osama is in Afghanistan, probably Kunar."
- November: CIA Director Michael Hayden, in a speech to the Atlantic Council, states that bin Laden is probably hiding in the tribal area of northwest Pakistan and that his capture remains a top U.S. priority. Hayden states that bin Laden is "putting a lot of energy into his own survival, a lot of energy into his own security. In fact, he appears to be largely isolated from the day-to-day operations of the organization he nominally heads."

=== 2009 ===
- February 17: A research team led by Thomas W. Gillespie and John A. Agnew of UCLA publish a report in which they use satellite-aided geographical analysis to pinpoint three compounds in Parachinar, Pakistan as likely hideouts of bin Laden.
- March: The New York Daily News reported that the hunt for bin Laden had centered in the Chitral District of Pakistan, including the Kalam Valley.
- November 29: News report states bin Laden is living in Pakistan and Gordon Brown urges Pakistan to do more to break Al-Qaeda and find Osama bin Laden.
- December 4: BBC reports of informant having knowledge of bin Laden in Ghazni, south east Afghanistan in early 2009. Ghazni is a Taliban stronghold and many areas do not permit coalition forces. The detainee was involved in kidnappings and fundraising operations for Taliban operations in Afghanistan and Pakistan. Former CIA analyst Bruce Riedel is quoted as saying "The entire Western intelligence community, CIA and FBI, have been looking for Osama bin Laden for the last seven years and haven't come upon a source of information like this."

=== 2010 ===
- Nasser al-Bahri, a bodyguard for bin Laden in the late 1990s, writes a book, published in French as Dans l'ombre de Ben Laden (In the Shadow of Bin Laden), with French journalist Georges Malbrunot of the newspaper Le Figaro. According to al-Bahri, bin Laden is hiding in the regions in Afghanistan or along the border with Pakistan. Malbrunot stated in an interview with Mark Colvin of PM that bin Laden is likely "protected by tribes which are very loyal to him. These tribes, bin Laden has known them for the last 20 years. He help them financially and materially in the '80s and these tribes also, I think it's an important factor, are more loyal to the religion than to the typical tribal character, which mean that it's not very easy to bribe them." Malbrunot noted that "He's protected by perhaps, he kept three or four people around him from al Qaeda, and he can move with the protection of the tribal leaders and tribal connections in this region along the Pakistan, the Waziristan."
- Feathered Cocaine, a documentary by Icelandic filmmakers Om Marino Arnarson and Thorkell S. Hardarson dealing with the global falcon trade and featuring falconer Alan Parrot, claims that bin Laden, an avid falcon hunter, "has been taking part in the sport relatively freely" in Tehran in Iran since 2003.
- June 7: The Israeli-based intelligence news service DEBKAfile reports that bin Laden and top lieutenants have been living in the remote mountainous town of Sabzevar in northeastern Iran for the past five years, and that Turkish intelligence officials were aware of it.
- June 27: CIA Director Leon Panetta, speaking on ABC News' This Week, stated that the last time the CIA had "precise information" on bin Laden was "the early 2000s." Panetta states that "He is, as is obvious, in very deep hiding. He's in an area of the tribal areas of Pakistan, that is very difficult. The terrain is probably the most difficult in the world...All I can tell you is it's in the tribal areas...we know that he's located in that vicinity." Panetta states that "If we keep that pressure on, we think ultimately we can flush out bin Laden and Zawahiri and get after them."
- October 18: A senior NATO official tells CNN about claims that bin Laden is alive and well, living comfortably in a house in the north-west of Pakistan and being protected by local people and elements of Pakistani intelligence. Stating that "nobody in al Qaeda is living in a cave", the official stated the bin Laden was likely to have moved around in recent years in areas from the mountainous Chitral region in the far northwest, near the Chinese border, to the Kurram Valley bordering Tora Bora in Afghanistan. The official stated that Zawahiri is believed to be hiding close to bin Laden in houses in northwest Pakistan, but are not together. Another U.S. official stated that bin Laden and Zawahiri are "somewhere in the tribal areas of Pakistan near the Afghanistan border," but that their exact locations are unknown: "If we knew where he was – in a house, an apartment, a villa or an underground cave or bunker – we would have gotten him; we can't rule out he may be in a cave one day and a house in a city on another."
- October 28: An audio recording of bin Laden threatening France over their involvement in Afghanistan is pronounced genuine by the French Foreign Ministry.

=== 2011 ===
- May 1: American president Barack Obama addresses the nation at 11:35 pm EST to report that Osama bin Laden has been killed in Abbottabad in a U.S. operation. The compound was located at 34°10′9″N 73°14′33″E. Osama bin Laden's body is taken to the aircraft carrier USS Carl Vinson, where it is buried at sea somewhere in the North Arabian Sea, approximately 18°N 66°E.

== In media ==
- Where in the World Is Osama bin Laden?, a 2008 comedic documentary about filmmaker Morgan Spurlock searching for bin Laden in Pakistan
- Zero Dark Thirty, a 2012 American film directed by Kathryn Bigelow dramatizing the manhunt
- Manhunt: The Ten-Year Search for Bin Laden From 9/11 to Abbottabad, a 2012 book by Peter Bergen
- Manhunt: The Search for Bin Laden, a 2013 documentary film based on the 2012 book
- American Manhunt: Osama bin Laden, a 2025 Netflix documentary series

== See also ==
- Saad bin Laden
- Capture of Saddam Hussein
