= Zero Dark Thirty =

2012 American film by Kathryn Bigelow

- Theatrical release poster
- Directed by: Kathryn Bigelow
- Written by: Mark Boal
- Produced by: Kathryn Bigelow; Mark Boal; Megan Ellison
- Starring: Jessica Chastain; Jason Clarke; Joel Edgerton
- Cinematography: Greig Fraser
- Edited by: Dylan Tichenor; William Goldenberg
- Music by: Alexandre Desplat
- Production companies: Annapurna Pictures; First Light
- Distributed by: Columbia Pictures (through Sony Pictures Releasing)
- Release dates: December 10, 2012 (Los Angeles); January 11, 2013 (United States)
- Running time: 157 minutes
- Country: United States
- Language: English
- Budget: $40–52.5 million
- Box office: $132.8 million

Zero Dark Thirty is a 2012 American political action thriller film directed by Kathryn Bigelow and written by Mark Boal. Produced by Boal, Bigelow, and Megan Ellison, and independently financed by Ellison's Annapurna Pictures, the film dramatizes the nearly decade-long international manhunt for Osama bin Laden, leader of the terrorist network al-Qaeda, after the September 11 attacks, which culminates in the discovery of his compound in Pakistan and the U.S. military raid where bin Laden was killed on May 2, 2011. It stars Jessica Chastain as Maya, a fictional CIA intelligence analyst, with Jason Clarke and Joel Edgerton appearing in supporting roles.

Widely released on January 11, 2013, by Columbia Pictures through Sony Pictures Releasing, following its premiere in Los Angeles on December 10, 2012, Zero Dark Thirty received critical acclaim for its acting, direction, screenplay, sound design, and editing, and was a box office success, grossing $132 million worldwide. It appeared on 95 critics' top ten lists of 2012 and received five nominations at the 85th Academy Awards: Best Picture, Best Actress for Chastain, Best Original Screenplay, Best Film Editing, and Best Sound Editing, which it won in a tie with Skyfall; it also earned four Golden Globe Award nominations, including Best Actress in a Motion Picture (Drama) for Chastain, who won. Conversely, the film was accused of being pro-torture by U.S. senators John McCain, Dianne Feinstein, and Carl Levin.

== Plot ==
Maya is a CIA analyst tasked with finding the al-Qaeda leader Osama bin Laden. In 2003, she is stationed at the U.S. embassy in Pakistan. She and CIA officer Dan Fuller take part in the black site interrogations of Ammar, a detainee who is the nephew of Khalid Sheikh Mohammed, with suspected links to several of the hijackers in the September 11 attacks. After use of approved enhanced interrogation techniques, Ammar provides unreliable information on a suspected attack in Saudi Arabia, but reveals the name of the personal courier for bin Laden, Abu Ahmed al-Kuwaiti. Other detainee intelligence connects Abu Ahmed to courier traffic between Abu Faraj al-Libbi and bin Laden. In 2005 at a CIA black site, Maya attempts to interrogate Faraj. He denies knowing about a courier named Abu Ahmed; Maya interprets this as an attempt by Faraj to conceal Abu Ahmed's importance.

After interrogating Faraj, Dan tells Maya he is leaving to go back to Washington. He warns her to be careful once she returns back to Pakistan because everyone knows her there now. Once she returns, Maya goes to the Marriott hotel in Islamabad to meet fellow CIA officers for a drink when a bomb goes off.

In 2009, a Jordanian doctor highly placed in al-Qaeda has offered to become a US spy for $25 million. Maya's fellow officer and friend Jessica travels to a US base in Afghanistan to meet him, but he turns out to be a triple agent loyal to al-Qaeda. Jessica is killed, along with several other CIA officers, when he detonates a suicide vest. In response, Maya redoubles her efforts to find Abu Ahmed and bin Laden.

Thomas shares information from a Jordanian detainee claiming to have buried Ahmed in 2001. Another colleague discovers that Ahmed is likely a man named Ibrahim Sayeed, from information provided by Morocco after 9/11, and tells Maya. Believing that the man reported dead was Ahmed's brother, Maya contacts Dan, now a senior officer at the CIA headquarters for information on Sayeed's family. Dan obtains the phone number of Sayeed's mother from a Kuwaiti prince in exchange for a Lamborghini Gallardo Bicolor. Maya and her CIA team in Pakistan obtain Sayeed's number from calls with his mother and eventually, despite his use of tradecraft, identify him and his vehicle. They track his vehicle to a large urban compound in Abbottabad, Pakistan. Following a gunman attack on Maya, she is recalled to Washington, D.C. for a possible loss of her security cover.

The CIA places the traced compound under surveillance but is unable to confirm that bin Laden is in residence. Despite this, the President's National Security Advisor tasks the CIA with a plan to attack the place. Before briefing President Barack Obama, the CIA director holds a meeting of his senior officers, who estimate that bin Laden is 60–80% likely to be in the compound. Maya places her confidence at 100%, so the mission is eventually approved.

On May 2, 2011, the 160th Special Operations Aviation Regiment flies two stealth helicopters from Afghanistan into Pakistan with members of DEVGRU (SEAL Team Six) and the CIA's Special Activities Division to raid the compound. The Seals gain entry and kill several people in the compound, including a man whom they believe is bin Laden. Back at the U.S. base in Jalalabad Afghanistan, Maya confirms the corpse identity. Soon afterwards, she boards, as a single passenger on an empty military cargo plane back home and begins to cry.

== Cast ==
CIA

- Jessica Chastain as Maya Krauser, a CIA intelligence analyst (a composite character modeled in part after Alfreda Frances Bikowsky)
- Jason Clarke as Dan Fuller, a CIA intelligence officer
- Jennifer Ehle as Jessica Karley, a senior CIA analyst (based on Jennifer Matthews)
- Mark Strong as George, a senior CIA supervisor
- Kyle Chandler as Joseph Bradley, Islamabad CIA Station Chief (based on Jonathan Banks)
- James Gandolfini as CIA Director
- Harold Perrineau as Jack Fuller, a CIA analyst
- Mark Duplass as Steve Bradley, a CIA analyst
- Fredric Lehne as Fred "The Wolf" Guerrero, a CIA section chief (based on Michael D'Andrea)
- John Barrowman as Jeremy Karley, a CIA executive
- Jessie Collins as Debbie Stone, a CIA analyst
- Édgar Ramírez as Larry Handley, a CIA SAD/SOG operative
- Fares Fares as Hakim, a CIA SAD/SOG operative
- Scott Adkins as John Simmons, a CIA SAD/SOG operative
- Jeremy Strong as Thomas, a CIA analyst

US Navy

- Joel Edgerton as Patrick Grayston, DEVGRU (SEAL Team 6) team leader
- Chris Pratt as Justin Lenihan, DEVGRU operator.
- Callan Mulvey as Saber Till, DEVGRU operator.
- Phil Somerville as Phil, DEVGRU operator
- Taylor Kinney as Jared Bradley, DEVGRU operator
- Mike Colter as Mike, DEVGRU operator
- Frank Grillo as DEVGRU Commanding officer
- Christopher Stanley as JSOC Commander Vice Admiral Bill McRaven (Note: This is the spelling used by the film's end credits)

Other

- Stephen Dillane as National Security Advisor Thomas E. Donilon
- Mark Valley as C-130 pilot
- John Schwab as Deputy National Security Advisor
- Reda Kateb as Ammar, a terrorist who is tortured for information
- Homayoun Ershadi as Hassan Ghul
- Yoav Levi as Abu Farraj al-Libbi
- Ricky Sekhon as Osama bin Laden, leader and founder of al-Qaeda
- Ali Marhyar as interrogator on monitor

== Production ==
=== Titles ===
The film's working title was For God and Country. The title Zero Dark Thirty was officially confirmed at the end of the film's teaser trailer. Bigelow has explained that "it's a military term for early morning before dawn, and it refers also to the darkness and secrecy that cloaked the entire decade-long mission."

=== Writing ===
Kathryn Bigelow and Mark Boal had initially worked on and finished a screenplay centered on the December 2001 Battle of Tora Bora, and the long, unsuccessful efforts to find Osama bin Laden in the region. The two were about to begin filming when news broke that bin Laden had been killed.

They immediately shelved the film they had been working on and redirected their focus, essentially starting from scratch. "But a lot of the homework I'd done for the first script and a lot of the contacts I made, carried over," Boal remarked during an interview with Entertainment Weekly. He added, "The years I had spent talking to military and intelligence operators involved in counter-terrorism was helpful in both projects. Some of the sourcing I had developed long, long ago continued to be helpful for this version."

Along with painstakingly recreating the historic night-vision raid on the Abbottabad compound, the script and the film stress the little-reported role of the tenacious young female CIA officer who tracked down Osama bin Laden. Screenwriter Boal said that while researching for the film, "I heard through the grapevine that women played a big role in the CIA in general and in this team. I heard that a woman was there on the night of the raid as one of the CIA's liaison officers on the ground – and that was the start of it." He then turned up stories about a young case officer who was recruited out of college, who had spent her entire career chasing bin Laden. Maya's tough-minded, monomaniacal persona, Boal said, is "based on a real person, but she also represents the work of a lot of other women." In December 2014 Jane Mayer of The New Yorker wrote that "Maya" was modeled in part after CIA officer Alfreda Frances Bikowsky.

=== Filming ===
Zero Dark Thirty producers built a real compound in Jordan, based on what they could learn (from diagrams and reporting) about the building where the CIA's pursuit ended. The production designer—Jeremy Hindle, who had never made a feature film before—was responsible for making the building as real as possible. The cinder blocks with which the building was made, for example, were distressed so that they didn't look new. Parts of the film were shot at PEC University of Technology in Chandigarh, India. Some parts of Chandigarh were designed to look like Lahore and Abbottabad in Pakistan, where Osama bin Laden was found and killed on May 2, 2011. Parts of the film were shot in Mani Majra. Local members of right-wing parties protested, expressing anti-bin Laden and anti-Pakistan sentiments as they objected to Pakistani locations being portrayed on Indian soil. For a lone scene shot in Poland, the city of Gdańsk was reportedly offended for depicting it as a location for the CIA's clandestine and dark operations.

National security expert Peter Bergen, who reviewed an early cut of the film as an unpaid adviser, said at the time that the film's torture scenes "were overwrought". Boal said they were "toned down" in the final cut.

=== Music ===
Alexandre Desplat composed and conducted the film's score. The score, performed by the London Symphony Orchestra, was released as a soundtrack album by Madison Gate Records on December 19, 2012.

== Release ==
=== Distribution ===
Columbia Pictures distributed the film in the United States with Annapurna Pictures' international sales arm Panorama Media handling international rights through an independent distributors, Universal Pictures International co-distributed the film with Panorama in select European territories and South Africa. Icon Film Distribution distributed the film in Australia and Entertainment One distributed the film in Canada.

=== Marketing ===
Electronic Arts promoted Zero Dark Thirty in its video game Medal of Honor: Warfighter by offering downloadable maps of locations depicted in the film. Additional maps for the game were made available on December 19, to coincide with the film's initial release. Electronic Arts donated $1 to nonprofit organizations that support veterans for each Zero Dark Thirty map pack sold.

=== Theatrical ===
The film premiered in Los Angeles on December 10, 2012. It had a limited theatrical release on December 19, 2012, before expanding wide on January 11, 2013.

=== Home media ===
Zero Dark Thirty was released on DVD and Blu-ray Disc on March 26, 2013, by Sony Pictures Home Entertainment.

== Reception ==
=== Box office ===
The limited release of Zero Dark Thirty grossed $417,150 in the United States and Canada in only five theaters. A wide release followed on January 11.

Entertainment Weekly wrote, "The controversial Oscar contender easily topped the chart in its first weekend of wide release with $24.4 million." Zero Dark Thirty grossed $95,720,716 in the U.S. and Canada, along with $37,100,000 in other countries, for a worldwide total of $132,820,716. It was the top-grossing film of its wide release premiere weekend.

=== Critical response ===
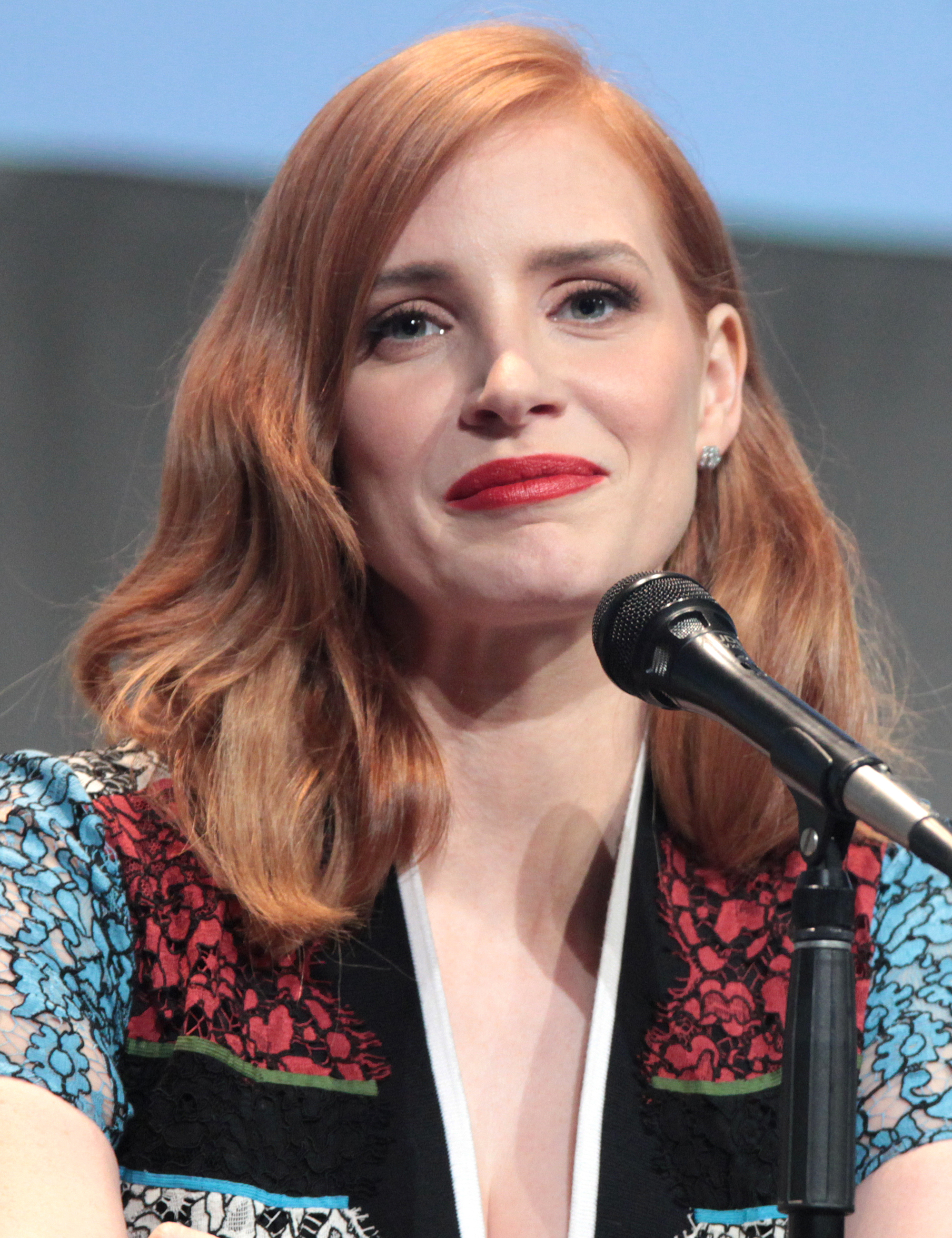
Jessica Chastain's performance garnered widespread critical acclaim and she received her second Academy Award and BAFTA nomination and her third SAG nomination. She also received her first Golden Globe Award for her performance in this film.

On Rotten Tomatoes the film has an approval rating of 91% based on 304 reviews, with an average rating of 8.60/10. The website's critical consensus reads, "Gripping, suspenseful, and brilliantly crafted, Zero Dark Thirty dramatizes the hunt for Osama bin Laden with intelligence and an eye for detail." On Metacritic the film has a weighted average score of 95 out of 100, based on 46 critics, indicating "universal acclaim". It was the site's best-reviewed film of 2012. Audiences polled by CinemaScore gave the film an average grade of "A−" on an A+ to F scale.

New York Times critic Manohla Dargis, who designated the film a New York Times critics' pick, said that the film "shows the dark side of that war. It shows the unspeakable and lets us decide if the death of Bin Laden was worth the price we paid."

Richard Corliss's review in Time magazine called it "a fine" movie and "a police procedural on the grand scale", saying it "blows Argo out of the water". Calling Zero Dark Thirty "a milestone in post-Sept. 11 cinema", critic A. O. Scott of The New York Times listed the film at number six of the top 10 films of 2012.

The New Yorker film critic David Denby lauded the filmmakers for their approach. "The virtue of Zero Dark Thirty", wrote Denby, "is that it pays close attention to the way life does work; it combines ruthlessness and humanity in a manner that is paradoxical and disconcerting yet satisfying as art." But Denby faulted the filmmakers for getting lodged on the divide between fact and fiction.

Roger Ebert of the Chicago Sun-Times gave the film three stars out of four. He believed the "opening scenes are not great filmmaking", but Ebert thought Zero Dark Thirty eventually proved itself with the quiet determination of Chastain's performance and a gripping portrayal of the behind-the-scenes detail that led to bin Laden's death.

=== Top ten lists ===
Zero Dark Thirty was listed on many critics' top ten lists. According to Metacritic the film appeared on 95 critics' top ten lists of 2012, 17 of which placed the film at No. 1.

- 1st – Ann Hornaday, The Washington Post
- 1st – Christopher Orr, The Atlantic
- 1st – David Denby, The New Yorker (tied with Lincoln)
- 1st – David Edelstein, New York
- 1st – Keith Phipps, The A.V. Club
- 1st – Lisa Schwarzbaum, Entertainment Weekly
- 1st – Mary Pols, Time
- 1st – Michael Phillips, Chicago Tribune
- 1st – Peter Knegt & Nigel M. Smith, Indiewire
- 1st – Scott Foundas, Village Voice
- 1st – Richard Roeper
- 2nd – A.A. Dowd and Ben Kenigsberg, Time Out Chicago
- 2nd – Eric Kohn, Indiewire
- 2nd – Gregory Ellwood, Hitfix
- 2nd – James Berardinelli, Reelviews
- 2nd – Joshua Rothkopf, Time Out New York
- 2nd – Noel Murray, The A.V. Club
- 2nd – Peter Travers, Rolling Stone
- 2nd – Scott Mantz, Access Hollywood
- 2nd – Stephanie Zacharek, Film.com
- 3rd – Anne Thompson & Caryn James, IndieWire
- 3rd – Betsy Sharkey, Los Angeles Times
- 3rd – Bill Goodykoontz, The Arizona Republic
- 3rd – Elizabeth Weitzman, New York Daily News
- 3rd – Mick LaSalle, San Francisco Chronicle
- 3rd – Stephen Holden, The New York Times
- 3rd – Tasha Robinson, The A.V. Club
- 3rd – Ty Burr, The Boston Globe
- 4th – Andrew O'Hehir, Salon.com
- 4th – Glenn Kenny, MSN Movies
- 4th – Marlow Stern, The Daily Beast
- 5th - Christy Lemire, Associated Press
- 5th – Drew McWeeny, HitFix
- 5th – Owen Gleiberman, Entertainment Weekly'
- 5th – Todd McCarthy, The Hollywood Reporter'
- 6th – A.O. Scott, The New York Times
- 6th – Richard Corliss, Time
- 7th – Alison Willmore, The A.V. Club
- 7th – Kevin Jagernauth, IndieWire
- 7th – Lisa Kennedy, The Denver Post
- 8th – Scott Tobias, The A.V. Club
- 9th – Joe Neumaier, New York Daily News
- 9th – Keith Uhlich, Time Out New York
- 10th – Dana Stevens, Slate
- 10th – Steven Rea, The Philadelphia Inquirer
- Best of 2012 (listed alphabetically, not ranked) – Kenneth Turan, Los Angeles Times
- Top 10 (listed alphabetically) – Joe Morgenstern, The Wall Street Journal
- Top 10 (listed alphabetically) – Manohla Dargis, The New York Times
- Top 10 (ranked alphabetically) – Calvin Wilson, St. Louis Post-Dispatch
- Top 10 (ranked alphabetically) – Richard Lawson, The Atlantic

In 2016, Zero Dark Thirty was voted the 57th greatest film to be released since 2000 in a critics' poll conducted by the BBC.

In 2025, Zero Dark Thirty was one of the films voted for the "Readers' Choice" edition of The New York Times' list of "The 100 Best Movies of the 21st Century," finishing at number 255.

=== Accolades ===
Zero Dark Thirty was nominated for five Academy Awards at the 85th Academy Awards: Best Picture, Best Actress, Best Original Screenplay, Best Sound Editing and Best Film Editing. Paul N. J. Ottosson won the Academy Award for Best Sound Editing, tying with Skyfall. This was only the sixth tie in Academy Awards history, and the first since 1994. Zero Dark Thirty was nominated for four Golden Globe Awards at the 70th Golden Globe Awards, including Best Motion Picture – Drama, Best Director, Best Screenplay, with Chastain winning Best Actress – Motion Picture Drama.

The Washington D.C. Area Film Critics Association's award for Best Director was given to Bigelow, the second time the honor has gone to a woman (the first also being Bigelow for The Hurt Locker). The film swept critics groups' awards for Best Director and Best Picture including the Washington D.C., New York Film Critics Online, Chicago and Boston film critics associations.

The February 2020 issue of New York Magazine lists Zero Dark Thirty as among "The Best Movies That Lost Best Picture at the Oscars."

== Historical accuracy ==
Zero Dark Thirty has received criticism for historical inaccuracy. Former Assistant Secretary of Defense Graham T. Allison has stated that the film is inaccurate in three important regards: the overstatement of the positive role of torture, the understatement of the role of the Obama administration, and the portrayal of the efforts as being driven by one agent battling against the CIA "system".

Steve Coll criticized the early depictions in the film that portrayed it as "journalism" with the use of composite characters. He took issue with the film's using the names of historical figures and details of their lives for characters, such as using details for "Ammar" to suggest that he was Ali Abdul Aziz Ali, whose nom de guerre was Ammar al-Baluchi. Coll said the facts about him were different from what was portrayed in the film, which suggests the detainee will never leave the black site. Al-Baluchi was transferred to Guantanamo in 2006 for a military tribunal.

Journalists Cathy Scott-Clark and Adrian Levy criticized the film as "materially wrong in many ways", especially its claim that torture unearthed vital knowledge leading to Osama bin Laden's capture. In truth, the real trail had been pieced together through dogged detective work, good luck, and well-crafted interrogations conducted long before the "enhanced interrogation techniques" were introduced. Peter Bergen agreed in his biography of Osama bin Laden, pointing out that coercive interrogations proved unreliable. Five key members of al-Qaeda subjected to coercive interrogation in CIA custody consistently provided misleading information about bin Laden's courier.

It was also criticized for its stereotypical portrayal of Pakistan as well as the inaccurate portrayal of Pakistani nationals speaking Arabic instead of Urdu and other regional languages, and locals wearing obsolete headgear.

== Controversies ==
=== Allegations of partisanship ===
Partisan political controversy related to the film arose before shooting began. Opponents of the Obama Administration charged that Zero Dark Thirty was scheduled for an October release just before the November presidential election to support his re-election. Sony denied that politics was a factor in release scheduling and said the date was the best available spot for an action-thriller in a crowded lineup. The film's screenwriter added, "the president is not depicted in the movie. He's just not in the movie."

The distributor, Columbia Pictures, sensitive to political perceptions, considered rescheduling the film release for as late as early 2013. It set a limited-release date for December 19, 2012, well after the election and rendering moot any alleged political conflict. The nationwide release date was pushed back to January 11, 2013, moving it out of the crowded Christmas period and closer to the Academy Awards. After the film's limited release, given the controversy related to the film's depiction of torture and its role in gaining critical information, The New York Times columnist Frank Bruni concluded that the film is "a far, far cry from the rousing piece of pro-Obama propaganda that some conservatives feared it would be". Two months later, the paper's columnist Roger Cohen wrote that the film was "a courageous work that is disturbing in the way that art should be". Cohen disagreed with Steve Coll's critique of the screenwriter's stated effort not to "play fast and loose with history", writing that "Boal has honored those words". Cohen ended with a note about a Timothy Garton Ash analysis of George Orwell mixing fact and "invented" stories in Down and Out in Paris and London – as further support for Boal's method.

=== Allegations of improper access to classified information ===
Several Republican sources charged the Obama Administration of improperly providing Bigelow and her team access to classified information during their research for the film. These charges, along with charges of other leaks to the media, became a prevalent election season talking point by conservatives. The Republican national convention party platform even claimed Obama "has tolerated publicizing the details of the operation to kill the leader of Al Qaeda." No release of these details has been proven according to the Navy Times.

The Republican congressman Peter T. King requested that the CIA and the U.S. Defense Department investigate if classified information was inappropriately released; both departments said they would look into it. The CIA responded to Congressman King writing, "the protection of national security equities – including the preservation of our ability to conduct effective counterterrorism operations – is the decisive factor in determining how the CIA engages with filmmakers and the media as a whole."

The conservative watchdog group Judicial Watch publicized CIA and U.S. Defense Department documents obtained through a Freedom of Information Act (FOIA) request, and alleged that "unusual access to agency information" was granted to the filmmakers. An examination of the documents showed no evidence that classified information was leaked to the filmmakers. In addition, CIA records did not show any involvement by the White House in relation to the filmmakers. The filmmakers have said they were not given access to classified details about Osama bin Laden's killing. In 2012, Judicial Watch released an article stating the Obama Administration admitted that the information provided to the production team could pose an "unnecessary security and counterintelligence risk" if the information were to be released to the public. Judicial Watch also found emails containing information on five CIA and military operatives that were involved in the Bin Laden operations. These emails were provided to the filmmakers, as was later confirmed by the Obama Administration in a sworn declaration.

In January 2013, Reuters reported that the United States Senate Select Committee on Intelligence would review the contacts between the CIA and the filmmakers to find out whether Bigelow and Boal had inappropriate access to classified information. In February, Reuters reported that the inquiry had been dropped.

In June 2013, information was released in regards to an unreleased U.S. Defense Department Inspector General's office report. It stated that in June 2011, while giving a speech at a CIA Headquarters event honoring the people involved in the Osama Bin Laden raid, CIA Director Leon Panetta disclosed information classified as "Secret" and "Top Secret" regarding personnel involved in the raid on the Bin Laden compound. He identified the unit that conducted the raid as well as naming the ground commander that was in charge. Panetta also revealed DoD information during his speech that was classified as "Top Secret". Unknown to him, screenwriter Mark Boal was among the around 1300 present during the ceremony.

=== Allegations of pro-torture stance ===
The film has been both criticized and praised for its handling of its subject matter, including the portrayal of the harsh "enhanced interrogation techniques", commonly classified as torture. The use of these techniques was long kept secret by the Bush administration. (See Torture Memos, The Torture Report.) Glenn Greenwald, in The Guardian, stated that the film takes a pro-torture stance, describing it as "pernicious propaganda" and stating that it "presents torture as its CIA proponents and administrators see it: as a dirty, ugly business that is necessary to protect America." Critic Frank Bruni concluded that the film appears to suggest "No waterboarding, no Bin Laden". Jesse David Fox writes that the film "doesn't explicitly say that torture caught bin Laden, but in portraying torture as one part of the successful search, it can be read that way." Emily Bazelon said, "The filmmakers didn't set out to be Bush-Cheney apologists", but "they adopted a close-to-the-ground point of view, and perhaps they're in denial about how far down the path to condoning torture this led them."

Journalist Michael Wolff slammed the film as a "nasty piece of pulp and propaganda" and Bigelow as a "fetishist and sadist" for distorting history with a pro-torture viewpoint. Wolff disputed the efficacy of torture and the claim that it contributed to the discovery of bin Laden. In an open letter, social critic and feminist Naomi Wolf criticized Bigelow for claiming the film was "part documentary" and speculated over the reasons for Bigelow's "amoral compromising" of film-making, suggesting that the more pro-military a film, the easier it is to acquire Pentagon support for scenes involving expensive, futuristic military equipment. Wolf likened Bigelow to the acclaimed director and propagandist for the Nazi regime Leni Riefenstahl, saying: "Like Riefenstahl, you are a great artist. But now you will be remembered forever as torture's handmaiden." Author Karen J. Greenberg wrote that "Bigelow has bought in, hook, line, and sinker, to the ethos of the Bush administration and its apologists" and called the film "the perfect piece of propaganda, with all the appeal that naked brutality, fear, and revenge can bring". Peter Maass of The Atlantic said the film "represents a troubling new frontier of government-embedded filmmaking".

Jane Mayer of The New Yorker, who has published The Dark Side, a book about the use of torture during the Bush administration, criticized the film, saying that Bigelow was

milk[ing] the U.S. torture program for drama while sidestepping the political and ethical debate that it provoked ... [By] excising the moral debate that raged over the interrogation program during the Bush years, the film also seems to accept almost without question that the CIA's 'enhanced interrogation techniques' played a key role in enabling the agency to identify the courier who unwittingly led them to bin Laden.

Author Greg Mitchell wrote that "the film's depiction of torture helping to get bin Laden is muddled at best – but the overall impression by the end, for most viewers, probably will be: Yes, torture played an important (if not the key) role." Filmmaker Alex Gibney called the film a "stylistic masterwork" but criticized the "irresponsible and inaccurate" depiction of torture, writing:

there is no cinematic evidence in the film that EITs led to false information – lies that were swallowed whole because of the misplaced confidence in the efficacy of torture. Most students of this subject admit that torture can lead to the truth. But what Boal/Bigelow fail to show is how often the CIA deluded itself into believing that torture was a magic bullet, with disastrous results.

Philosopher Slavoj Žižek, in an article for The Guardian, criticized what he perceived as a "normalization" of torture in the film, arguing that the mere neutrality on an issue many see as revolting is already a type of endorsement per se. Žižek proposed that if a similar film were made about a brutal rape or the Holocaust, such a movie would "embody a deeply immoral fascination with its topic, or it would count on the obscene neutrality of its style to engender dismay and horror in spectators." Žižek further panned Bigelow's stance of coldly presenting the issue in a rational manner, instead of being dogmatically rejected as a repulsive, unethical proposition.

Journalist Steve Coll, who has written on foreign policy, national security and the bin Laden family, criticized the filmmakers for saying the film was "journalistic", which implies that it is based in fact. At the same time, they claimed artistic license, which he described "as an excuse for shoddy reporting about a subject as important as whether torture had a vital part in the search for bin Laden". Coll wrote that "arguably, the film's degree of emphasis on torture's significance goes beyond what even the most die-hard defenders of the CIA interrogation regime ... have argued", as he said it was shown as critical at several points.

U.S. Senator John McCain, who was tortured during his time as a prisoner of war in North Vietnam, said that the film left him sick – "because it's wrong". In a speech in the Senate, he said, "Not only did the use of enhanced interrogation techniques on Khalid Sheikh Mohammed not provide us with key leads on bin Laden's courier, Abu Ahmed, it actually produced false and misleading information." McCain and fellow senators Dianne Feinstein and Carl Levin sent a critical letter to Michael Lynton, chairman of the film's distributor, Sony Pictures Entertainment, stating, "[W]ith the release of Zero Dark Thirty, the filmmakers and your production studio are perpetuating the myth that torture is effective. You have a social and moral obligation to get the facts right."

Michael Morell, the CIA's acting director, sent a public letter on December 21, 2012, to the agency's employees, which said that Zero Dark Thirty

takes significant artistic license, while portraying itself as being historically accurate ... [The film] creates the strong impression that the enhanced interrogation techniques that were part of our former detention and interrogation program were the key to finding Bin Ladin. That impression is false. ... [T]he truth is that multiple streams of intelligence led CIA analysts to conclude that Bin Ladin was hiding in Abbottabad. Some came from detainees subjected to enhanced techniques, but there were many other sources as well. And, importantly, whether enhanced interrogation techniques were the only timely and effective way to obtain information from those detainees, as the film suggests, is a matter of debate that cannot and never will be definitively resolved.

The Huffington Post writer G. Roger Denson countered this, saying that the filmmakers were being made scapegoats for information openly admitted by government and intelligence officials. Denson said that Leon Panetta, three days after Osama bin Laden's death, seemed to say that waterboarding was a means of extracting reliable and crucial information in the hunt for bin Laden. Denson noted Panetta speaking as the CIA chief in May 2011, saying that "enhanced interrogation techniques were used to extract information that led to the mission's success". Panetta said waterboarding was among the techniques used. In a Huffington Post article written a week later, Denson cited other statements from Bush government officials saying that torture had yielded information to locate bin Laden.

Human Rights Watch criticized the film for "wrongly suggest[ing] that torture was an ugly but useful tactic in the fight against terrorism", and for falsely depicting the use of torture as critical to leading to locating bin Laden, citing statements by McCain, Feinstein, Levin and Morell. The article also called for the Senate Select Committee on Intelligence to declassify the report on torture adopted by the committee in December 2012 in order to "counter misinformation about the supposed value of “enhanced interrogation techniques” and to provide the public with a full accounting of past US government policy and practice." Laura Pitter, the former deputy director of the US Program at HRW, criticized CIA counterterrorism chief Jose Rodriguez's response to the film, stating "[the film]... has spawned a wide array of commentary. None is as misleading or morally disturbing, however, as the one from... Rodriguez, who seized on the film as an opportunity to defend—and completely distort—the CIA torture program he supervised. This from the guy who, ignoring instructions from the White House and CIA, destroyed 92 videotapes depicting the waterboarding of detainees in CIA custody..." Pitter also wrote of the discussion around the film, "We would not even be having this debate, and this film probably would not have even been made in the way it was, had the U.S. government not gone to such great lengths over the past 11 years to cover up the tracks of its crimes and bury the facts..."

National security reporter Spencer Ackerman said the film "does not present torture as a silver bullet that led to bin Laden; it presents torture as the ignorant alternative to that silver bullet". Critic Glenn Kenny said that he "saw a movie that subverted a lot of expectations concerning viewer identification and empathy" and that "rather than endorsing the barbarity, the picture makes the viewer in a sense complicit with it", which is "[a] whole other can of worms". Writer Andrew Sullivan said, "the movie is not an apology for torture, as so many have said, and as I have worried about. It is an exposure of torture. It removes any doubt that war criminals ran this country for seven years". Filmmaker Michael Moore similarly said, "I left the movie thinking it made an incredible statement against torture", and noted that the film showed the abject brutality of torture. Critic Andrew O'Hehir said that the filmmaker's position on torture in the film is ambiguous, and creative choices were made and the film poses "excellent questions for us to ask ourselves, arguably defining questions of the age, and I think the longer you look at them the thornier they get".

Screenwriter Boal described the pro-torture accusations as "preposterous", stating that "it's just misreading the film to say that it shows torture leading to the information about bin Laden", while director Bigelow added: "Do I wish [torture] was not part of that history? Yes. But it was." In February 2013 in The Wall Street Journal, Boal responded to the Senate critics, being quoted as saying "[D]oes that mean they can use the movie as a political platform to talk about what they've been wanting to talk about for years and years and years? Do I think that Feinstein used the movie as a publicity tool to get a conversation going about her report? I believe it, ..." referring to the intelligence committee's report on enhanced interrogations. He also said the senators' letter showed they were still concerned about public opinion supporting the effectiveness of torture and didn't want the movie reinforcing that. Boal said, though, "I don't think that [effectiveness] issue has really been resolved" if there is a suspect with possible knowledge of imminent attack who will not talk.

In an interview with Time magazine, Bigelow said: "I'm proud of the movie, and I stand behind it completely. I think that it's a deeply moral movie that questions the use of force. It questions what was done in the name of finding bin Laden."

=== Objections over the use of recordings of 9/11 victims ===
An extensive clip of the phone call to headquarters from Betty Ong, a flight attendant on one of the hijacked American Airlines planes, was used in the beginning of the film without attribution. Ong's family requested that, if the film won any awards, the filmmakers apologize at the Academy Awards ceremony for using the clip without getting her heirs' consent. Her family also asked that the film's U.S. distributors make a charitable donation in Ong's name, and should go on record that the Ong family does not endorse the use of torture, which is depicted in the film during the search for Osama bin Laden. Neither the filmmakers nor the U.S. distributors ever heeded any of the Ong family's requests.

Mary and Frank Fetchet, parents of Brad Fetchet, who worked on the 89th floor of the World Trade Center's south tower, criticized the filmmakers for using a recording of their son's voicemail without permission. The recording has previously been heard in broadcast TV news reports and in testimony for the 9/11 Commission.

== See also ==
- List of films featuring the United States Navy SEALs
- Seal Team Six: The Raid on Osama Bin Laden
- No Easy Day: The Firsthand Account of the Mission that Killed Osama bin Laden
- The Report: A 2019 film depicting the Senate Intelligence Committee's investigation of the CIA's use and ineffectiveness of torture following the September 11th attacks
