= Abu Ahmed al-Kuwaiti =

Al-Qaeda courier who led U.S. intelligence to Osama bin Laden

Ibrahim Saeed Ahmed
- أبو أحمد الكويتي
- Born: Ibrahim Saeed Ahmed c. 1978; Kuwait
- Died: 2 May 2011 (aged 32–33); Abbottabad, Khyber Pakhtunkhwa, Pakistan
- Cause of death: Gunshot wounds
- Citizenship: Pakistani
- Relatives: Abrar Saeed Ahmed (brother)
- Military career
- Allegiance: Al-Qaeda
- Service years: 1990s–2011
- Rank: Senior courier
- Conflicts: Afghan Civil War; War in Afghanistan; Battle of Tora Bora (WIA); War in North-West Pakistan; Operation Neptune Spear †

Ibrahim Saeed Ahmed (c. 1978 – 2 May 2011), known by the nom de guerre Abu Ahmed al-Kuwaiti, was a Pakistani al-Qaeda courier who served as a trusted aide to Osama bin Laden.

Born in Kuwait to Pakistani parents, al-Kuwaiti was an ethnic Pashtun who adopted his nom de guerre to reflect his birthplace. U.S. intelligence sources described him as one of bin Laden's most trusted associates, serving as his primary courier and facilitating communications within the al-Qaeda network. His phone communications ultimately led U.S. intelligence to bin Laden's compound in Abbottabad, Pakistan, where both men were killed during a raid by SEAL Team Six on 2 May 2011.

== 2000s ==
Arshad Khan was born in c. 1978 in Kuwait. His father's name is reported to be Naqab Khan. Al-Kuwaiti was a Pashtun who was born and grew up in Kuwait and spoke Pashto (in a cultivated, urbane accent) and Arabic. He was a protégé of Khalid Sheikh Mohammed and had reportedly given computer training in Karachi to the perpetrators of the September 11 attacks on the United States. He was implicated in the attacks and was contacted in the aftermath by Indonesian militant Riduan Isamuddin. Al-Kuwaiti provided a safe haven to Isamuddin and several of his close associates in his home in a quiet residential neighborhood of Karachi.

Guantanamo Bay documents dated 16 January 2008 revealed that Mohamedou Ould Salahi had claimed that Abu Ahmed al-Kuwaiti was wounded while fleeing Tora Bora after the Battle of Tora Bora in December 2001 and had later died from his arm injuries. The document claimed he was a mid-level al-Qaeda operative who facilitated the movement and safe haven of senior al-Qaeda members and families. As a speaker of Arabic and Pashto he could communicate and move easily among both the Arab members of al-Qaeda and the Pashtun tribesmen of Pakistan.

Contradicting the claims by Salahi that al-Kuwaiti had died in December 2001, in 2007 U.S. officials discovered the courier's real name and, in 2009, that he lived in Abbottabad, Pakistan. These findings were based on information collected from Guantánamo Bay detainees, notably Hassan Ghul in 2004. From Ghul, U.S. intelligence learned that al-Kuwaiti was also close to Mohammed's successor Abu Faraj al-Libi. Ghul further revealed that al-Kuwaiti had not been seen in some time, a fact which led U.S. officials to suspect he was traveling with bin Laden.

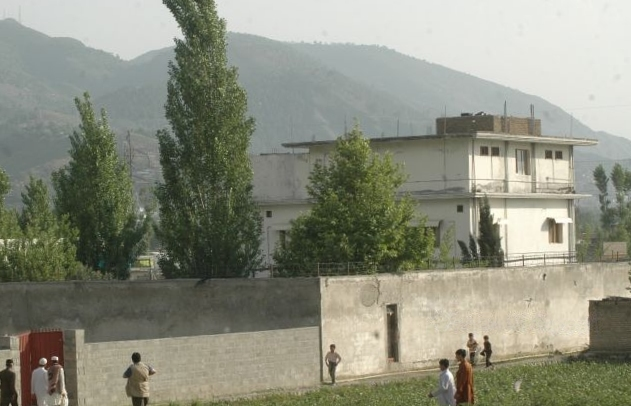
View of the compound

He was reportedly tracked from Peshawar by Pakistanis working for the CIA. "The National Security Agency reportedly tracked phone calls between the courier Abu Ahmed al-Kuwaiti's relatives in the Persian Gulf to all numbers in Pakistan, and NSA surveillance eventually tracked Abu Ahmed al-Kuwaiti's location in Pakistan via one such phone call", the AP writes.

In August 2010, they tracked al-Kuwaiti as he drove from Peshawar to a residence in Abbottabad – and as analysts inventoried the compound's striking security features they became convinced that it housed a high-level al-Qaeda figure."

Compound where al-Kuwaiti hid Osama bin Laden and his family

== 2010s ==
Using satellite photos and intelligence reports, the CIA sought to identify the inhabitants of the fortified compound in Abbottabad. In September 2010, the CIA concluded that the compound was "custom built to hide someone of significance" and that it was very likely that bin Laden was residing there. Al-Kuwaiti was said to be one of the two tall fair-skinned bearded men who claimed to be ethnic Pashtuns and were known in the community to be living at the house and occasionally attended local funerals.

He went locally by the name Arshad Khan, and his brother (or cousin as some neighbors thought) went by the name Tareq Khan. They claimed to be from a village near the town of Charsadda. Some people believed he was from Shangla (Khakhtagatta area) as reported by New York Times reporter Sanaul Haq while following the origin of the man killed in the raid along with bin Laden. Charsadda lies about 180 kilometres to the west, while Shangla is situated on the northern side 190 kilometres from Abbottabad in Pakistan's Khyber Pakhtunkhwa province (old name NWFP). Some locals thought that the Khan brothers had obtained their wealth from a family-owned hotel in Dubai. Al-Kuwaiti also claimed that because of his occupation as a money changer, he needed high walls to keep out enemies he had encountered in his profession. He was described as "a friendly man from the tribal-areas".

== Death ==
Al-Kuwaiti, along with bin Laden, was killed during the raid on the compound by a U.S. Naval Special Warfare Development Group team on 2 May 2011. According to the 2012 book No Easy Day by Chief Petty Officer Matt Bissonnette (under the pen name Mark Owen), al-Kuwaiti was shot and killed by Bissonnette and Petty Officer 1st Class Will Chesney (the latter was the handler of Cairo, a Belgian Shepherd and U.S. military working dog who also participated in the raid) during a short gunfight in the compound's guest house. Bissonnette was lightly injured with bullet fragments in the left shoulder while al-Kuwaiti's wife Mariam was shot and wounded in the right shoulder in the crossfire.
