= Where in the World Is Osama bin Laden? =

2008 documentary film by Morgan Spurlock

- Promotional poster parodying Raiders of the Lost Ark
- Directed by: Morgan Spurlock
- Written by: Jeremy Chilnick; Morgan Spurlock
- Starring: Morgan Spurlock
- Cinematography: Daniel Marracino
- Edited by: Gavin Coleman; Julie "Bob" Lombardi
- Distributed by: The Weinstein Company
- Release dates: January 21, 2008 (Sundance Film Festival); April 18, 2008 (United States)
- Country: United States
- Language: English
- Box office: $384,955

Where in the World Is Osama bin Laden? is a 2008 documentary film conceived by Adam Dell and co-written, produced, directed by, and starring Morgan Spurlock.

The title of the film is a play on the title of the television game show and computer game series, Where in the World Is Carmen Sandiego?, and other "Where in the World is" themes.

In 2017, the CIA revealed that Osama bin Laden himself had a copy of the film on hard drives recovered at his hideout in Abbottabad, Pakistan.

== Synopsis ==
After some comical animations involving Al-Qaeda leader Osama bin Laden, the film shows Spurlock visiting various countries associated with or affected by bin Laden. The film contains short interviews with many people about bin Laden and Islamic fundamentalism, and about the United States and its war on terror. Supposedly, Spurlock searches for bin Laden, and he even asks people at random in the street where he is.

The film is intercut with images of Alex Jamieson, Spurlock's then-wife, in the late stages of her pregnancy. Much of Spurlock's commentary is based on the concerns of a new father.

Spurlock visits Morocco, Egypt, Saudi Arabia, Jordan, Israel, Afghanistan, and Pakistan. In Afghanistan, guarded by about 21 Afghan Army soldiers, he visits Tora Bora. A local government official is shown who wants to change it into an amusement park. Spurlock is also shown on a U.S. Army patrol as an embedded journalist.

Spurlock is shown hesitating to enter the area of Pakistan near the Afghan border where bin Laden is at the time, which is closed to foreigners, and deciding not to go there, arguing that it is not worth the risk. He concludes that the people in the countries he visited are ordinary people just like himself and the audience.

Spurlock guesses that bin Laden is likely hiding in tribal lands near Peshawar, Pakistan. Three years later Bin Laden was found 200 km away in Abbottabad.

== Reception ==
Where in the World Is Osama bin Laden? received a mixed reception from critics. On Rotten Tomatoes, the film holds an approval score of 38% based on 108 reviews, with an average rating of 4.90/10. The consensus reads, "Morgan Sprulock's [sic] doc offers occasional insights but gets bogged down by the director/subject's gimmicky schtick." On Metacritic, the film has a score of 45 out of 100 based on 28 critics' reviews, indicating "mixed or average reviews".

== See also ==
- List of cultural references of the September 11 attacks
- Being Osama
