= Chak Shah Muhammad =

- Location within Pakistan
- Coordinates: 33.9908°N 72.9605°E
- Country: Pakistan
- Province: Khyber Pakhtunkhwa
- Elevation: 562 m (1,844 ft)
- Time zone: UTC+5 (PST)

Chak Shah Muhammad is a feudal village in Haripur District in Khyber Pakhtunkhwa province of Pakistan. A small farming village of low brick houses, poultry farms and wheat fields, Osama bin Laden allegedly lived in the village for two and a half years prior to moving to a compound in Abbottabad, Pakistan on 6 January 2006, after he fled from Tora Bora caves to avoid capture by U.S. forces in December 2001. Bin Laden arrived in Pakistan in January 2002, 4 months after 9/11. It has a population of 1,500.
