= Matt Bissonnette (author) =

U.S. Navy SEAL and author

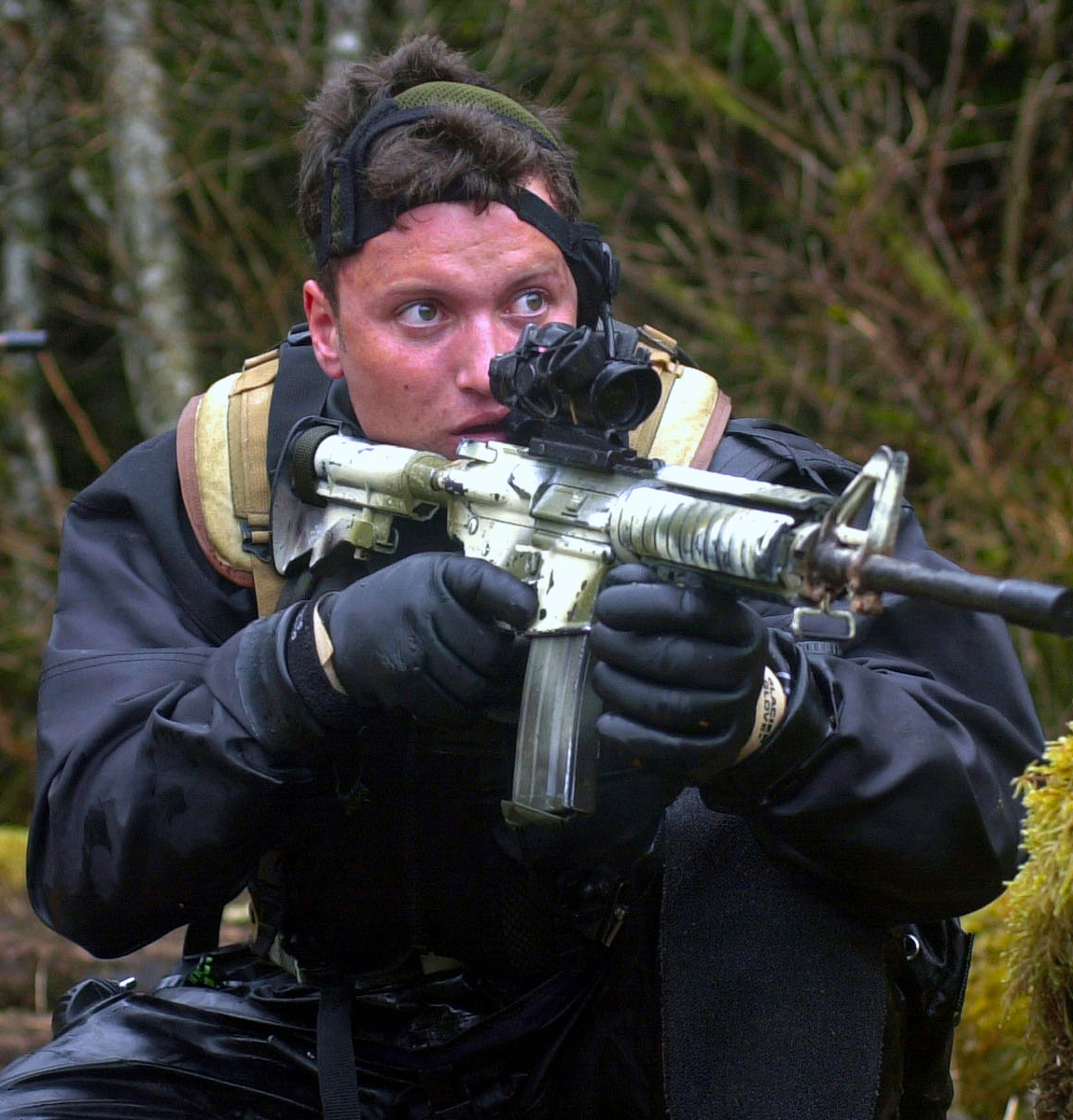
- Bissonnette during Northern Edge in 2001
- Education: Biola University
- Military career
- Allegiance: United States of America
- Branch: United States Navy
- Service years: 1998–2012
- Rank: Petty Officer 3rd class (2001) (Rating: Special Warfare Operator; Formerly: Torpedoman's Mate)
- Nickname: Mark Owen
- Units: United States Navy SEALs; SEAL Team Five; Naval Special Warfare Development Group
- Known for: Writing No Easy Day
- Conflicts: Global War on Terror; Iraq War; War in Afghanistan; Maersk Alabama hijacking; Operation Neptune Spear
- Awards: Silver Star

Matt Bissonnette is a former United States Navy SEAL and author of No Easy Day, a book which he wrote using the pen name Mark Owen. The book chronicles his life and military service but is primarily about his involvement in Operation Neptune Spear. Bissonnette writes that he was present on the third floor of Osama bin Laden's compound in Abbottabad when the terrorist leader was killed.

== Military career ==
Bissonnette grew up hunting and fishing in the remote Alaskan town of Aniak. After graduating high school in 1994, he attended Biola University and earned a bachelor's degree in Sociology in 1998. He then enlisted in the Navy, graduating with BUD/S class 226 as the Honor-man (top of the class) in 1999 and served with SEAL Team Five. During Bissonnette's first deployment, the September 11 attacks occurred and he was among the first to be deployed in support of the Global War on Terror. In 2004, he completed selection and training to enter the Naval Special Warfare Development Group (DEVGRU) and participated in several operations in Iraq and Afghanistan.

Bissonnette was involved in the Maersk Alabama hijacking rescue operation in 2009 and Operation Neptune Spear in 2011, both alongside DEVGRU teammate Robert J. O'Neill, who claims to have fired the shots that killed Bin Laden. Bissonnette claims in his book that an unnamed DEVGRU teammate actually fired the shots that killed Bin Laden, not O'Neill who claims that the unnamed teammate fired and missed.

Some SEALs question whether it is possible to ever determine whose shots killed the terrorist leader. Post retirement, both SEALs received criticism for their books and differences in their accounts of the events. A DoD investigation revealed that Bissonnette and six other SEALs had served as consultants on the video game, Medal of Honor: Warfighter, at Bissonnette's urging. Letters of reprimand, which are damaging to Naval careers, were sent to all seven. The SEALs did not seek clearance with their superiors to be involved with the project and showed the developers some of their gear. At the end of his service, Bissonnette held the title "Team Leader" and had conducted hundreds of missions throughout 13 combat deployments overseas.

== Post-military career ==
Almost a year after the Bin Laden mission, Bissonette left active duty and began writing No Easy Day with journalist Kevin Maurer. Bissonnette says the book accurately portrays the events of Operation Neptune Spear. The book was published by Dutton Penguin and went on sale September 4, 2012. Bissonnette stated that most of the proceeds from the book will be donated to families of SEALs killed in action.

Bissonnette and his publisher decided to release the book without first submitting it for a United States Department of Defense (DoD) review, which generated much controversy. The DoD claims the book contains classified information, which the book's publisher and Bissonnette deny. This ultimately led the publisher to release the book on September 4, a week earlier than the originally planned 11 September release date. It also placed on The New York Times Best Seller list. A few months before coming to national attention, Bissonnette sold his family's Virginia Beach home and quietly left town.

In 2014, Bissonnette published a follow-up, No Hero: The Evolution of a Navy SEAL, which was vetted by the DoD, but was still investigated by the government. The book does not address the controversy caused by the first book. Bissonnette says the government redacted a lot of it which he appealed, but was only able to clear about 50 percent of them. In August 2016, Bissonnette settled a lawsuit and agreed to pay back his royalties of US$6.8 million to the US government.

Bissonnette was interviewed twice on 60 Minutes, with the first interview receiving 12.32 million viewers. His appearance was disguised by skilled makeup artists so well that even his lawyer did not recognize him. His voice was also disguised. Bissonnette continues to hide his face and use the pseudonym "Mark Owen." He is also an executive producer (credited as Mark Owen), starting in the second season of the television series SEAL Team. Lead actor in SEAL Team David Boreanaz wears Bissonnette's actual military issue helmet and has promised to do so throughout the entire run of the show even though he could wear a lighter prop helmet. Bissonnette continues to serve on the advisory board of the GWOT Memorial Foundation as well as advocating for transitioning veterans and helping raise money and awareness for multiple veteran-related charities.

Bissonnette released a new book in 2026 titled: No Easy Way. He also appeared on the Shawn Ryan Show in 2025.

== Awards and decorations ==
Bissonnette received more than 30 medals and awards according to a short biography from the Navy. Here are a few confirmed ones:

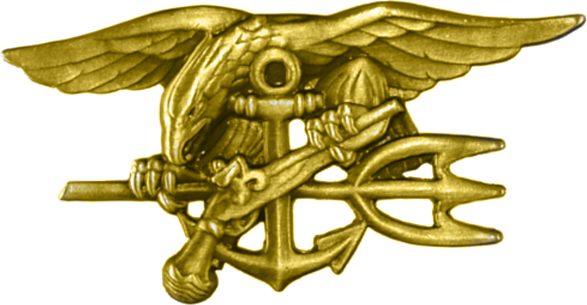

Badge	Special Warfare insignia		
1st Row	Silver Star		Bronze Star with "V" device and 4 Gold 5/16 inch stars
2nd Row	Purple Heart	Joint Service Commendation Medal with "V" device	Navy and Marine Corps Commendation Medal with "V" device
3rd Row	Combat Action Ribbon	Navy Presidential Unit Citation	National Defense Service Medal
4th Row	Global War on Terrorism Service Medal	Afghanistan Campaign Medal	Iraq Campaign Medal
5th Row	Global War on Terrorism Expeditionary Medal	Navy Rifle Marksmanship Medal with expert device	Navy Pistol Marksmanship Medal with expert device
Badge	Navy and Marine Corps Parachutist Insignia		

== See also ==
- List of United States Navy SEALs
