= Pachir Aw Agam District =

Coordinates: 34°5′16″N 70°16′50″E

Pachir Aw Agam District پچير او اګام ولسوالۍ
- District
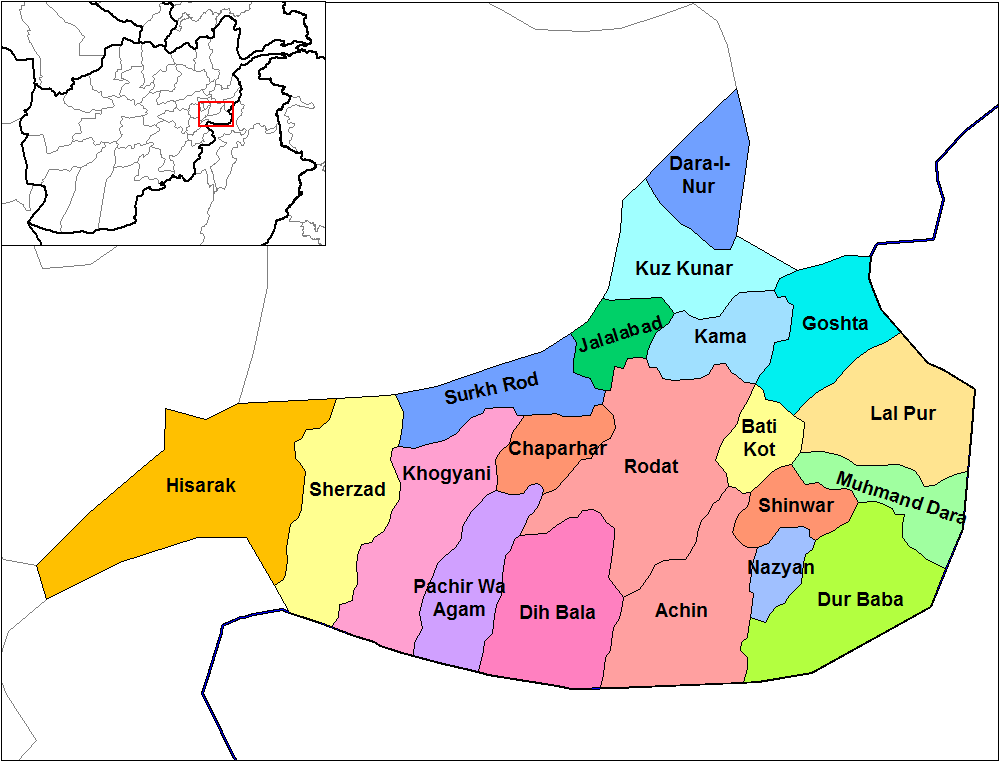
- Pachir Aw Agam District, Nangarhar Province.
- Country: Afghanistan
- Province: Nangarhar Province
- Capital: Pachir Aw Agam

Population (2002)
  - Total: 39,280
- Time zone: UTC+4:30 (Afghanistan Standard Time)

Pachir Aw Agam (Pashto: پچير او اګام ولسوالۍ), or Pachir Wa Agam, is a district in the southeast of Nangarhar Province, Afghanistan, bordering Pakistan. Its population, which is 100% Pashtun, was estimated at 39,280 in 2002, of whom 15,700 were children under 12. The district is within the heartland of the Khogyani tribe of Pashtuns. The district centre is the village of Pachir Aw Agam.

The district has faced heavy conflict for at least a quarter of a century. It was a stronghold of the Mujahadeen during the Soviet war and was heavily bombed during the 2001 United States–led war. The cave complex of Tora Bora, one of the most important strongholds of Al-Qaeda and the Taliban, is in Pachir Aw Agam district. As result, the district was the site of a United States–led operation in 2001 to clear Tora Bora of insurgents, and an attempt of ISIL-K to capture both the cave complex as well as its surroundings in 2017.

The Pachir Aw Agam District consists of two parts first Upper Pachir and second lower Pachir.
