= Battle of Tora Bora (2017) =

2017 military engagement in Afghanistan

- Part of the War in Afghanistan
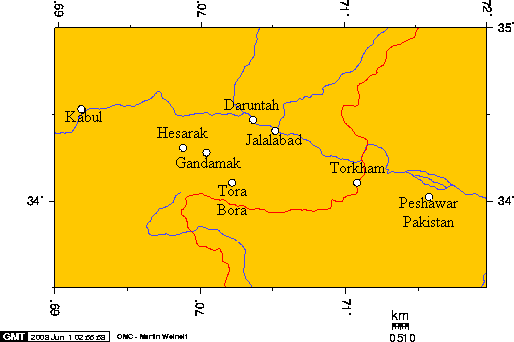
- Tora Bora in the wider region.
Date	6–25 June 2017 (2 weeks and 5 days)
Location	Pachir Aw Agam District, Nangarhar Province, Afghanistan
Result	Afghan government victory
Territorial changes	The Afghan government captures Tora Bora.

Belligerents
(Islamic State) ISIL-K; Supported by: Pakistan (Nangarhar NDS claim)	Taliban Islamic Republic of Afghanistan; Supported by: RS: United States

Commanders and leaders
(Islamic State) Abu Omar Khorasani	Unknown Local tribal elders Maj. Gen. Mohammad Zaman Waziri

Units involved
Unknown	Tora Bora garrison Local pro-government militias Afghan National Army (from 14 June): 201st Corps; Commandos; United States Air Force

Strength
"Hundreds"–1,000	Unknown

Casualties and losses
"Dozens" killed (ISIL-K offensive); 22 killed, 10 wounded (government offensive)	12+ killed Unknown
- 2,000 families displaced

The Battle of Tora Bora in June 2017, also known as the Second Battle of Tora Bora was a military engagement for the cave complex of Tora Bora and its surroundings in Afghanistan. Fighting took place between the Islamic State of Iraq and the Levant – Khorasan Province (ISIS–K) and forces opposed to it, namely the Taliban, militias formed by the population of the Pachir Aw Agam District, and the Afghan National Army. After heavy clashes ISIS–K forces initially succeeded in capturing Tora Bora from the Taliban on 13–14 June 2017, but Afghan government forces retook the cave complex by 17 June.

== Background ==
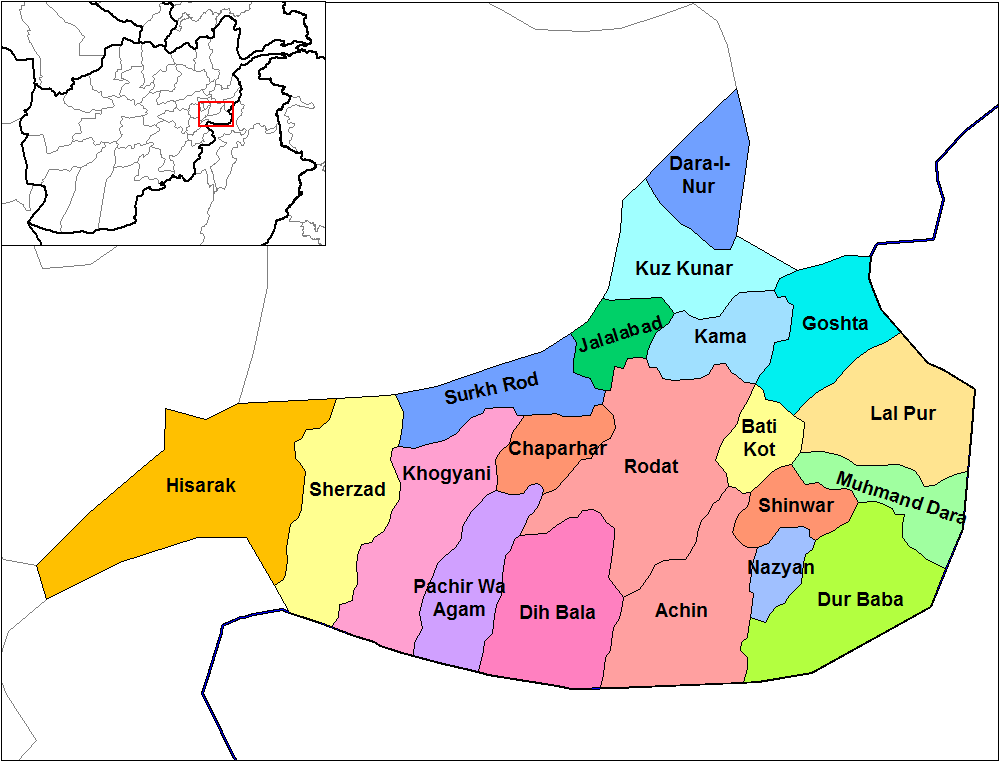
The districts of Nangarhar Province.

Although Tora Bora, former stronghold of Osama bin Laden, was cleared of Taliban forces during a United States-led operation in 2001, the militant group soon retook the mountain stronghold. Subsequently, Tora Bora came to function as an important base for the Taliban insurgency, while the area around it mostly fell under the group's influence. The Taliban's control over much of Nangarhar Province's hinterland was challenged upon the foundation of ISIS–K in 2015, however, and the two militant organizations began a brutal conflict for dominance. Meanwhile, the Afghan government's control in these remote areas was mostly limited to some outposts and population centers. Nevertheless, pro-government self-defense groups and tribal militias did emerge to fight against all insurgent groups in the area.

The Pachir Aw Agam District, where Tora Bora is located, was home to both Taliban as well as government followers, and thus quickly became a target for ISIS–K, which began to terrorize the district's population through killings, abductions, raids and looting. As result, the locals became extremely hostile and opposed to ISIS–K. On 13 April 2017, the United States bombed and largely destroyed the cave systems in Achin District that were used by ISIS–K as main base. As result, the group was deprived of its sanctuary; according to Afghan politician and former warlord Hazrat Ali, this caused ISIS–K to seek a new refuge. Probably due to its strategic location the Islamic State militants chose Tora Bora as prospective new headquarters, and moved to capture it from the Taliban.

== Battle ==
=== ISIS–K capture of Tora Bora ===
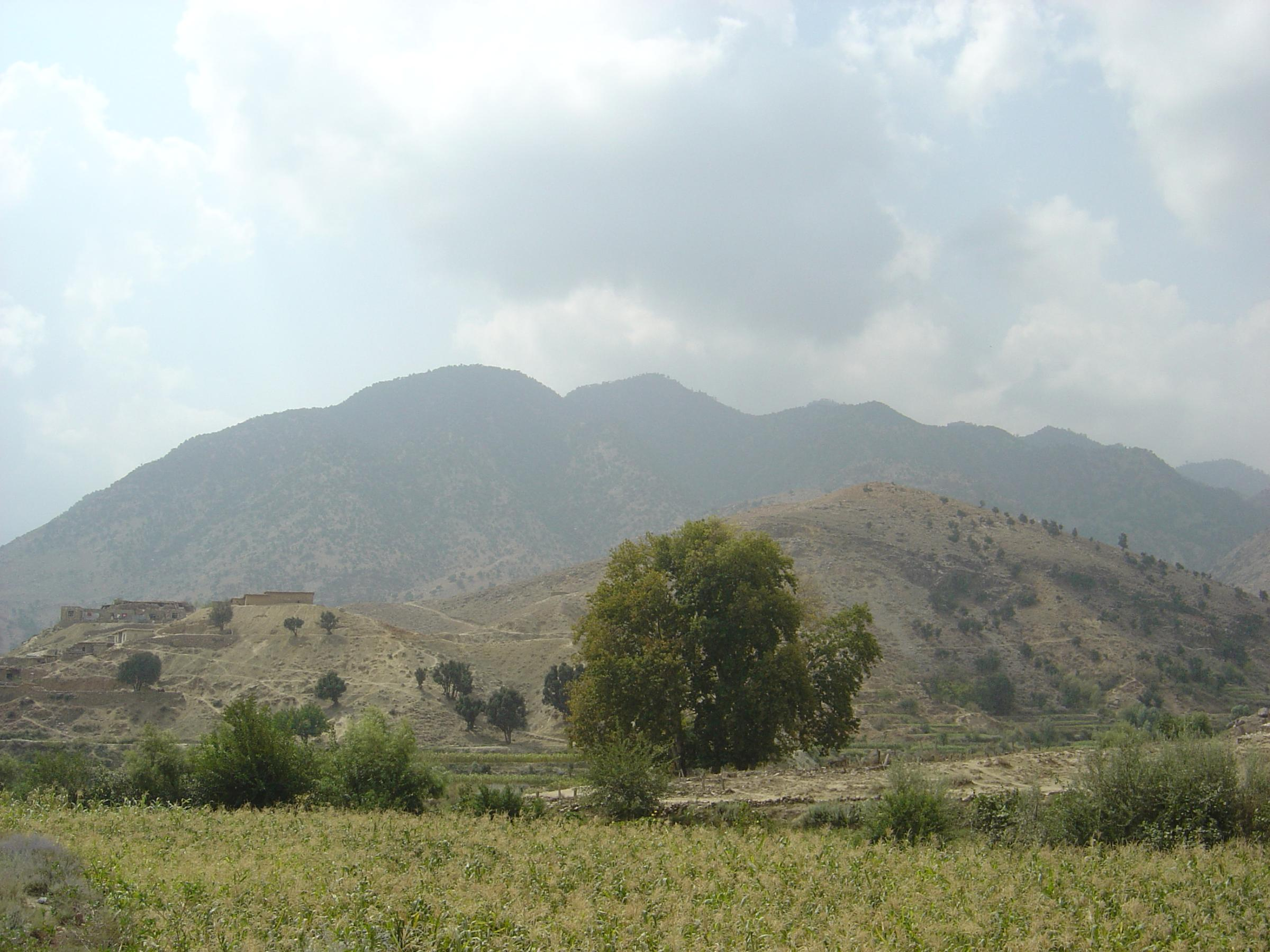
The mountains of Tora Bora.

ISIS–K began its offensive to capture the mountain stronghold on 6 June with allegedly up to 1,000 militants. The head of the Afghan National Directorate of Security in Nangarhar Province accused Pakistan of supporting the ISIS–K offensive. After the Islamic State fighters began to assault the Taliban positions, local militias joined the fight against ISIS–K. Although they traditionally supported the government and opposed the Taliban, these militias saw ISIS–K as a greater threat due to the group's brutal reputation. It remains unclear, however, whether the militias directly aided the Taliban or operated separately. In consequence of the resulting clashes, about 500 families were displaced. After three days of heavy fighting in the mountains, the first ISIS–K assault was beaten back by the Taliban and pro-government forces. Suffering "dozens" of casualties, the attackers were forced to scatter and retreat.

Despite this setback, ISIS–K soon regrouped and renewed their offensive. Calls by the locals for the government to provide aid to them went unheeded, and on late 13 June the Islamic State fighters eventually managed to capture much territory around Tora Bora after fierce fighting against both the local militias and the Taliban. On early 14 June, the Taliban defenses at the mountain stronghold completely collapsed, and the group's fighters fled from the area. Without the Taliban forces to support them, the local militias of Tora Bora were no longer able to hold their positions and also retreated, taking their families with them. Though both the Taliban as well as some pro-government sources denied that all of Tora Bora had fallen to ISIS–K, and maintained that Taliban elements still held out in the region, local villagers as well as the Afghan military reported that the Islamic State forces had set up their flag and heavy artillery on the mountains over Tora Bora.

After taking control of Tora Bora, ISIS–K proceeded to advance against the government in the wider Pachir Aw Agam District, with one commander of the group stating: "We are in Tora Bora but this is not the end. The plan is to take more territory from the government and the Taliban." According to a local reporter of Voice of America, the whole district was on the verge of collapse. ISIS–K began to propagate its victory at Tora Bora on its Radio Khilafat, while urging locals who had fled to return to their homes. According to security analyst and counter-terrorism expert David Otto, however, the area around Tora Bora was so hostile to ISIS–K and the Taliban so entrenched there that the former group would not be able to hold it for long.

=== Government offensive ===
Before the Taliban could launch a counter-attack, however, President Ashraf Ghani ordered the Afghan National Army's 201st Corps to launch their own offensive against Tora Bora on 14 June. The army quickly moved against ISIS–K, and by 16 June had reportedly begun to push the militants back. On the next day, the Afghan National Army stormed the Tora Bora cave complex from the foot of the mountains, while Commandos were airdropped onto the mountain peaks. The stronghold quickly fell, while the Afghan government forces proceeded with clearing operations in the area and its surroundings. On 25 June, the Afghan Ministry of Defense officially declared that ISIS–K had been completely evicted from the area around Tora Bora, and that the cave system would be turned into a military base of the Afghan military.

== Aftermath ==
In July 2017, the Afghan National Directorate of Security financed and armed a new militia of around 300 locals from Pachir Aw Agam District to combat ISIS–K in the area around Tora Bora. Meanwhile, ISIS–K had renewed its operations in the Tora Bora region, reportedly raiding and destroying local Taliban outposts.
