= Tora Bora =

Cave complex in eastern Afghanistan

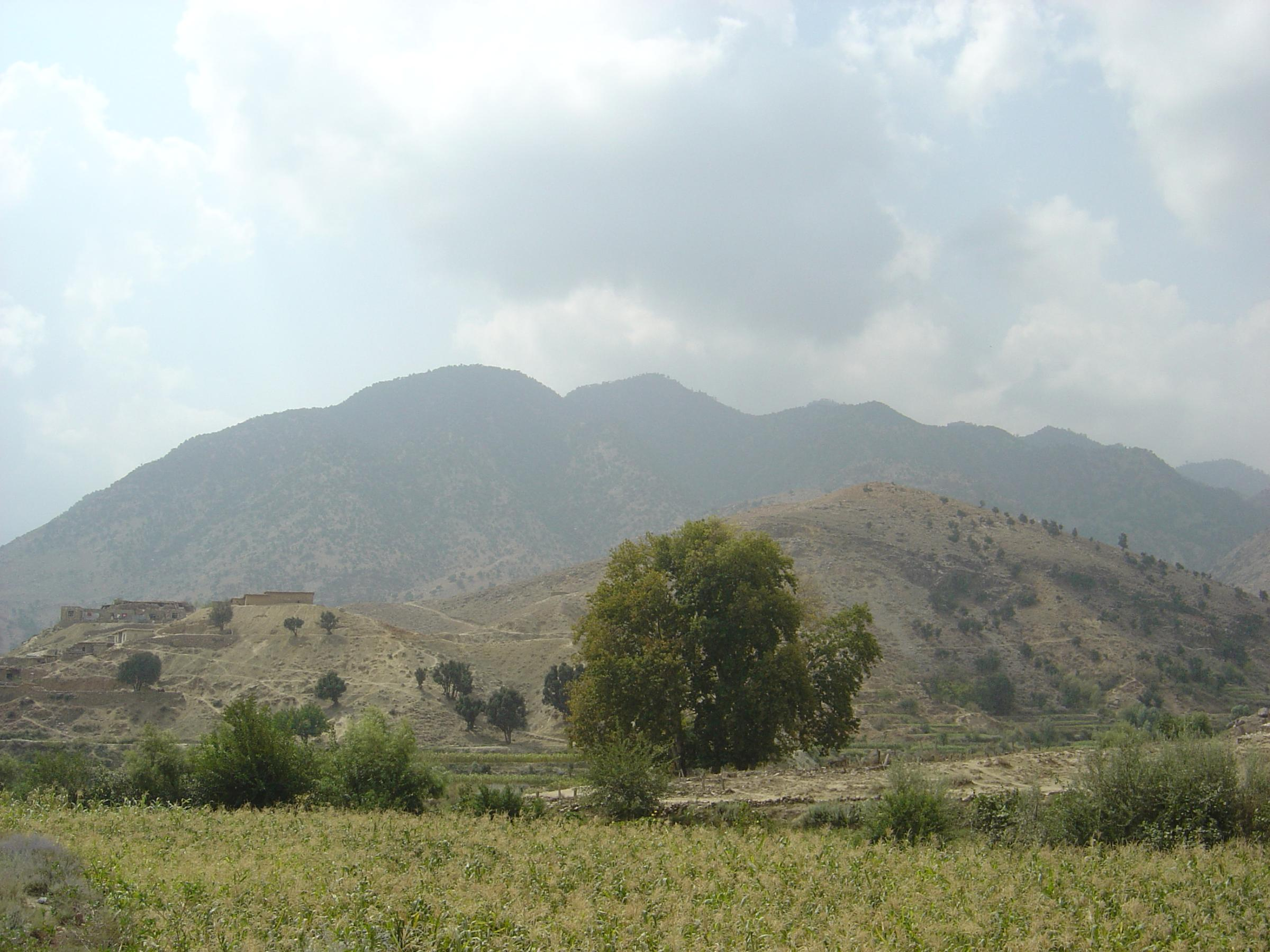

- Location within Afghanistan
- Location: Safed Koh mountain range, Afghanistan
- Coordinates: 34.117°N 70.217°E
- Geology: Metamorphic gneiss and schist

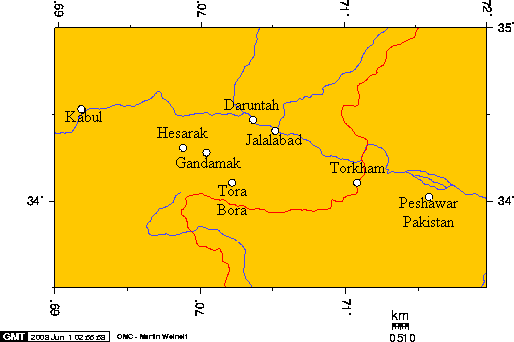
Tora Bora's location in relation to Jalalabad and other cities in the provinces of Nangarhar, Kabul and Peshawar

Tora Bora (Pashto: توره بوړه, "Black Cave") is a cave complex, part of the Spin Ghar (White Mountains) mountain range of eastern Afghanistan. It is situated in the Pachir Aw Agam District of Nangarhar, approximately 50 kilometres (30 miles) west of the Khyber Pass and 10 km (6 mi) north of the border of the Khyber Pakhtunkhwa province in Pakistan. Tora Bora and the surrounding Spin Ghar range had natural caverns formed by streams eating into the limestone, that had later been expanded into a CIA-financed complex built for the Afghan mujahideen. Tora Bora was known to be a stronghold location of mujahideen, used by military forces against the Soviet Union during the 1980s. Osama Bin Laden hid in the Tora Bora caves from approximately 17 November to mid-December 2001. He likely escaped on or around 15–16 December 2001.

== Geology ==
The geology of Tora Bora is predominantly metamorphic gneiss and schist.

== History ==
=== Military base ===
In October and November 1980, during Operation "Shkval", this complex was taken by the "Kaskad" special forces unit of the USSR KGB, together with the 66th motorized rifle brigade of the 40th Army of the Soviet troops in Afghanistan. As Colonel Valentin Gerasimenko wrote about the first assault, “By that time, Tora Bora was still a little-known, but already covered with a veil of mystery, the base of the Dushmans. Only later will it surpass the Panjshir Valley in its glory and fame, in the number of assaults and destruction”.

June 18–19, 1981 - in the province of Nangarhar, 85 km south of Jalalabad, in the area of the Afghan-Pakistani border, units of the Soviet 66th motorized rifle brigade and part of the Afghan 11th Jalalabad infantry division take the fortified area of the Mujahideen Tora Bora.

July 22–29, 1983 - operation in Tora-Bora of the 66th motorized rifle brigade.

The base at Tora Bora was developed as a CIA-financed complex built for the Mujahideen following the 1979 Soviet invasion of Afghanistan, and has been described by the western media as an "impregnable cave fortress" housing 2,000 men complete with a hospital, a hydroelectric power plant, offices, a hotel, arms and ammunition stores, roads large enough to drive a tank into, and sophisticated tunnel and ventilation systems.

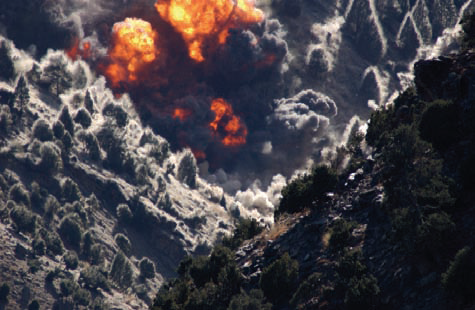
US airstrike during the Battle of Tora Bora in 2001

During the U.S. invasion of Afghanistan, the cave complex was one of the strongholds of the Taliban and Al-Qaeda, according to United States Secretary of Defense Donald Rumsfeld. It was the location of the December 2001 Battle of Tora Bora, and suspected hideout of Al-Qaeda leader Osama bin Laden which led his escape into neighboring Pakistan in January 2002. Bin Laden and his family moved to a new compound in the village of Chak Shah Muhammad, a wealthy suburb of Bilal Town near Abbottabad on 6 January 2006. It was reported that in 2007, U.S. intelligence suspected bin Laden planned to meet with top Al-Qaeda and Taliban commanders at Tora Bora prior to the launch of a possible attack on Europe or the United States.

Both the British and American press published detailed plans of the base. When shown a plan during an NBC interview, Rumsfeld said, "This is serious business; there's not one of those, there are many of those".

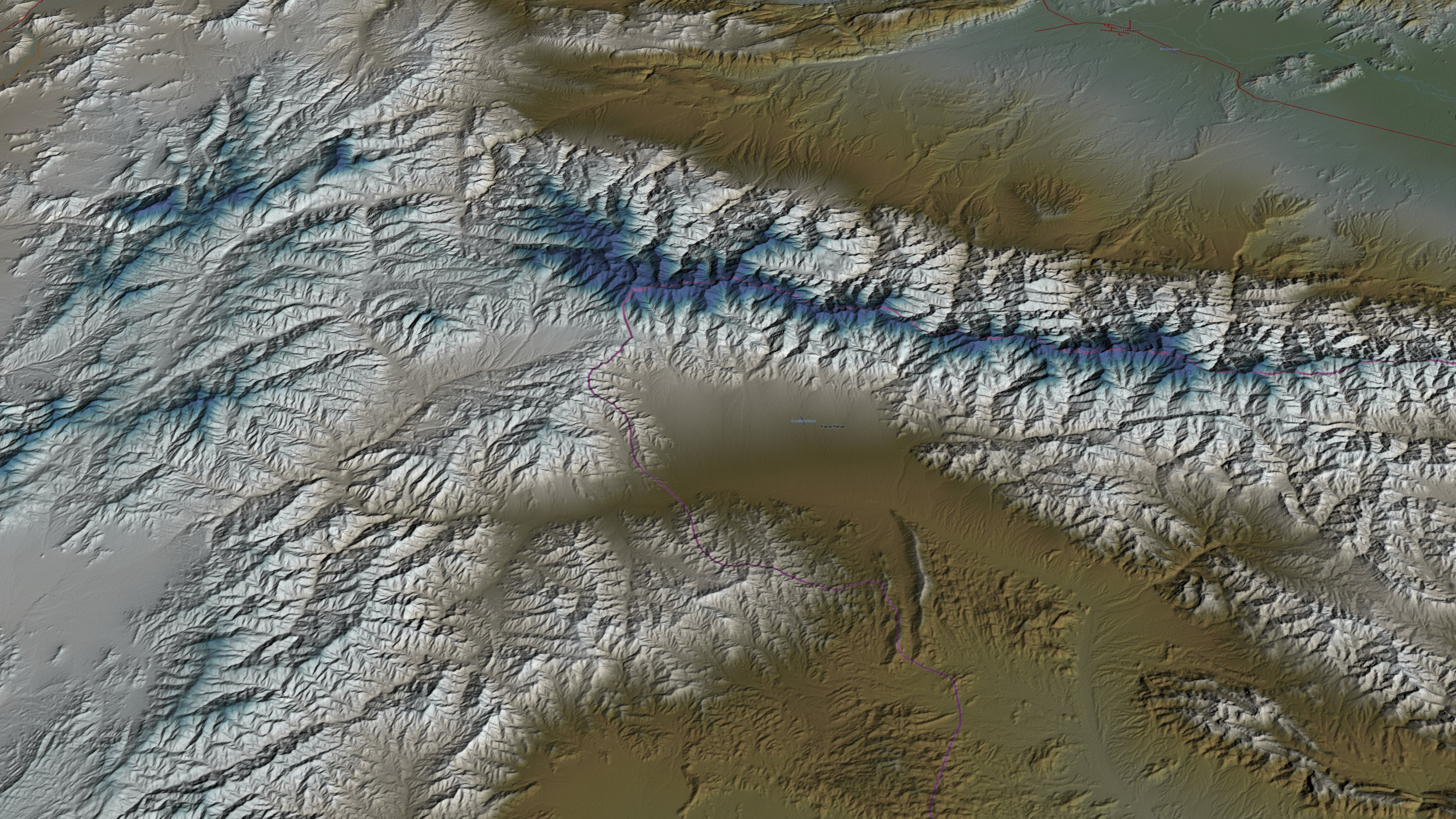
Aerial view, 3D computer generated image. Tora Bora is in the upper-right quadrant.

An elaborate military operation was planned which included deployment of the CIA-US Special Operations Forces team with laser markers to guide non-stop heavy air strikes during 72 hours. When Tora Bora was eventually captured by the U.S. and Afghan troops, no traces of the supposed "fortress" were found despite painstaking searches in the surrounding areas. Tora Bora turned out to be a system of small natural caves housing, at most, 200 fighters. While arms and ammunition stores were found, there were no traces of the advanced facilities claimed to exist.

In a 2002 interview with by PBS's Frontline, a Staff Sergeant from the U.S. Special Forces Operational Detachment Alpha (ODA) 572 described the caves:

Again, with the caves, they weren't these crazy mazes or labyrinths of caves that they described. Most of them were natural caves. Some were supported with some pieces of wood maybe about the size of a 10-foot by 24-foot room, at the largest. They weren't real big. I know they made a spectacle out of that, and how are we going to be able to get into them? We worried about that too, because we see all these reports. Then it turns out, when you actually go up there, there's really just small bunkers, and a lot of different ammo storage is up there. – Jeff, Staff Sgt. ODA 572

The complex later was retaken by the Taliban, and served as an important base for the Taliban insurgency. In 2017, Tora Bora was attacked and captured by the Islamic State of Iraq and the Levant – Khorasan Province (ISIL-K), though the Afghan National Army soon recaptured it.

== See also ==
- Qanat – Water supply system developed in ancient Iran
- Zhawar – Area in Khost, Afghanistan
