= No Easy Day =

2012 book by Mark Owen

- Author: Mark Owen; Kevin Maurer
- Language: English
- Subject: Death of Osama bin Laden; U.S. Naval Special Warfare Development Group (DEVGRU); Maersk Alabama hijacking
- Publisher: Dutton Penguin
- Publication date: September 4, 2012
- Publication place: United States
- Media type: Print (Hardcover); Amazon Kindle; iBooks (electronic); iTunes (audiobook)
- Pages: 304
- ISBN: 978-0525953722

No Easy Day: The Firsthand Account of the Mission that Killed Osama bin Laden (2012) is a military memoir by a former member of the United States Naval Special Warfare Development Group (DEVGRU) who participated in the mission that resulted in the death of Osama bin Laden. The book was written by Matt Bissonnette under the pen name Mark Owen. It details Owen's career with DEVGRU, including several combat missions in which he participated with the unit. At least half of the book focuses on Owen's participation in the mission that killed bin Laden.

Owen and his publisher's decision to release the book without first submitting it for United States Department of Defense (DoD) review generated controversy. The DoD claims that the book contains classified information, which the book's publisher denies. In late August 2012, advance publicity increased the initial print run from 300,000 copies to 575,000. This ultimately led the publisher to release the book on September 4, a week earlier than the originally planned September 11 release date. It also made the New York Times bestseller list.

Shortly after the book's announcement, Owen's identity was revealed as former U.S. Navy SEALs Chief Special Warfare Operator Matt Bissonnette and the DoD confirmed that he was in fact the author. For media appearances, including an interview on 60 Minutes, Owen appeared incognito. In August 2016, he was ordered to return his royalties of US$6.8 million to the US federal government.

== Content ==
In the book, Owen chronicles his upbringing in Alaska and his long desire to be a SEAL. Owen completed BUD/S training in 1999 and served with SEAL Team Five. He recounts the rigors of his entry into DEVGRU and describes several operations in which he participated with the group in Iraq and Afghanistan. Owen also discusses his involvement in the Maersk Alabama hijacking rescue operation in 2009. Throughout, he describes the camaraderie, professionalism, and dedication of his teammates during extremely demanding training and dangerous combat missions.

The second half of the book details Owen's participation in the raid that targeted bin Laden. Owen writes that he was one of the team members present in the third-floor room of bin Laden's compound when the terrorist leader was killed.

In the months following the mission, Owen left active duty and began writing the book with the journalist Kevin Maurer. Owen says the book accurately portrays DEVGRU's relationship and involvement with Operation Neptune Spear.

The book was published by Dutton Penguin and went on sale September 4, 2012, a week before the eleventh anniversary of the September 11 attacks. Owen stated that most of the proceeds from the book will be donated to families of SEALs killed in action.

== Background ==
In early September 2012, a former SEAL named Brandon Webb stated that he learned of Owen's intent to write the book after a "slight" from the U.S. Navy shortly before he separated from the service. According to Webb, when Owen told his comrades on SEAL Team Six of his intent to leave the service, he was ostracized by his leadership and ordered to return to his home base while his unit was in the middle of a training exercise. The book's publisher disputed Webb's account, repeating co-author Maurer's statement that,

After spending several very intense months working with Mark Owen on this book, I know that he wrote this book solely to share a story about the incredible men and women defending America all over the world. Any suggestion otherwise is as ill-informed as it is inaccurate.

== U.S. government response ==
Before the book was released, DoD press secretary George E. Little stated that the book had yet to be evaluated for sensitive information that could potentially jeopardize national security. Lieutenant Colonel James Gregory of the DoD stated that, should the book contain specialized information about SEAL weapons and tactics, Owen could potentially be charged with a criminal offense. Christine Ball of Dutton Penguin stated that the contents of the book were vetted by a former special operations attorney and that sensitive content would not be an issue.

On August 25, 2012, members of al Qaeda spread Owen's personal information, calling for militants to exact revenge upon him, identifying him as the one responsible for the death of bin Laden.

On August 30, 2012, the Pentagon announced that it was considering legal action against the former U.S. Navy SEAL for material breach of non-disclosure agreements with his first-hand account of the raid that killed Osama bin Laden. The DoD chief counsel at the time, Jeh Johnson, sent Owen a letter threatening him with legal action to pressure him and his publisher to withdraw the book from release until it could be vetted by the DoD. According to the DoD, Owen had signed a Classified Information Non-Disclosure Agreement and a 2007 Sensitive Compartmented Information (SCI) Nondisclosure Statement that requires pre-publication security review under certain circumstances. Owen's lawyer, Robert D. Luskin, responded that the non-disclosure statements only require review of items that touch certain, highly classified programs, and Owen's book does not meet that description.

In an e-book, No Easy Op: The Unclassified Analysis of the Book Detailing the Killing of OBL, Webb and other ex-SEALs state that Owen would have been "best served" by submitting the book for official review before its release, but understand his decision not to. Said the No Easy Op authors,

It has been our experience as writers that DOD reviews are painfully long and typically are more concerned with removing information that might make senior leadership look bad than with ensuring operational security [OPSEC]. Such a review would have come with intense scrutiny and put the integrity of the story at risk.

In October 2012, the DoD informed Stanley A. McChrystal that its security review of his forthcoming memoir, My Share of the Task, which had been under DoD review for 22 months, was not yet complete. The book's publisher was forced to postpone the book's release from its previously planned publication date of November 12, 2012.

On September 5, 2012, Pentagon officials stated that Owen revealed classified information in the book and it could endanger other special operations servicemen. Department of Defense Press Secretary George Little told reporters the department "believe[s] that sensitive and classified information is contained in the book" and called its publication without review the "height of irresponsibility."

In the book, Owen mentions several SEAL-related charities and asks readers to consider donating to those organizations. On September 5, 2012, one of the organizations, the Navy SEAL Foundation, stated that it would refuse to accept any donations related to the book or associated activities. Unnamed retired SEAL officers interviewed by the Washington Times stated that, in their opinion, the book does not contain classified information. The officers stated that they expected the SEAL community to shun Owen, because he broke the informal code of silence that DEVGRU members traditionally adhere to.

The Atlantic speculated in October 2012 that Owen and his publisher skipped a Pentagon review of their manuscript because they wanted to beat Mark Bowden's forthcoming book on the bin Laden raid, The Finish, to market. According to Bowden, when he contacted Owen seeking an interview in "late summer" 2011, Owen asked him when Bowden's book would be published. Bowden said that he found it a little "cheap" and "cheesy" that Owen purposely planned to beat him to market while also taking a pen name, "Mark Owen", that is similar to his name, Mark Bowden. Bowden added,

To be honest, I hope he sells a million copies. I honestly think he is an American hero. Here's a guy who spent ten years fighting these wars, and if anybody deserves to sell a lot of books, it's him. I wish him well. I'm glad to have had the input [of his book]. I would rather have had it directly myself, but I completely understand why he did it the way he did.

In November 2012, it was revealed that seven SEALs recruited by Owen had been disciplined for revealing classified information to a video game company. Owen recruited seven of his former SEAL members to serve as paid consultants where they revealed details. All failed to notify their commanding officer and go through the proper channels; they revealed specifics, including showing their equipment to the game makers. They received a letter of reprimand, called "a career killer," making them unable to receive promotions, and had their wages cut for two months.

In November 2014, Owen sued his lawyer for $8 million, arguing the attorney improperly advised him that he did not need to have the manuscript reviewed by DoD. Owen revealed that his failure to have the book reviewed caused him to settle with the government by forfeiting $4.5 million, loss of his security clearance (and future consultant work), loss of the movie rights, and damage to his reputation.

In 2014, he published a follow-up, No Hero: The Evolution of a Navy SEAL, which was vetted by the DoD, but is still under investigation by the government.

In August 2016, Owen settled a lawsuit and agreed to pay back his royalties of US$6.8 million to the US government.

== Reception ==
=== Reviews ===
Kim Curtis of the Associated Press stated that the book's strengths were its cast of characters including Owen, and its "remarkably intimate glimpse into what motivates men striving to join an elite fighting force like the SEALs—and what keeps them there". She compliments the book's "breathlessly paced, inexorable march toward an inevitable ending".

Dexter Filkins, journalist and Pulitzer Prize finalist, wrote positively about the book, but described the end as giving off "a tacky feel". He explains "Owen suggests that he doesn't think much of President Obama, doesn't have much respect for the civilians who ordered the raid and believes, more or less, that anyone in war who doesn't carry a gun is a wimp". Owen "seems to resent the fact that Obama took credit for the raid and at one point even resisted signing a framed flag for him, on the now-preposterous grounds that he didn't want his identity revealed". Filkins concludes: "This is the carping of a warrior with little appreciation of what his country actually stands for—like that messy thing called democratic politics. After all, he's just a killing machine".

Tony Perry of the Los Angeles Times called the book an "important historical document" and "brisk and compelling in its telling of the training, execution and immediate aftermath of the bin Laden mission by the elite SEAL Team 6." He noted that Owen's efforts to protect his fellow SEALs' identities introduced some "blandness" into his story.

Janet Maslin of The New York Times described the book as an "exciting, suspenseful account" of how Owen trained for the bin Laden and other, potentially dangerous missions. Maslin added that the book's details of certain aspects of the bin Laden raid were "shocking and revelatory".

Gary Anderson wrote for The Washington Times that the book's "author and his co-writer have done what they set out to do. They give a feel for the sights, sounds and emotions of the raid and how the special operations forces of the United States train for and plan such operations." Anderson says that he has a "problem" with the author's decision to write the book, saying, "open-source information about special operations set out in this way puts our troops and their missions in danger."

=== Sales ===
On September 13, 2012, the book replaced Fifty Shades of Grey atop USA Today's bestselling books list. Dutton Penguin stated that the book's print run for its first week of sales was up to 1 million copies, not counting e-books. USA Today stated that hardback versions were outselling e-versions.
