= Bilal Town =

- Town
- Location within Pakistan
- Coordinates: 34°10′18″N 73°14′17″E
- Country: Pakistan
- Province: Khyber-Pakhtunkhwa
- District: Abbottabad
- Tehsil: Abbottabad

Bilal Town is a wealthy northeastern suburb of Abbottabad, Pakistan. The National Cyber Crime Investigation Agency (NCCIA Abbottabad) has an office there and it lies between central Abbottabad and Kakul, where the Pakistan Military Academy is located. The upper-class neighbourhood contains some large houses and open fields and has a high number of retired military officials living in the community.

The majority of the population are Tanolis, Karlals and Jadoons.

== History ==
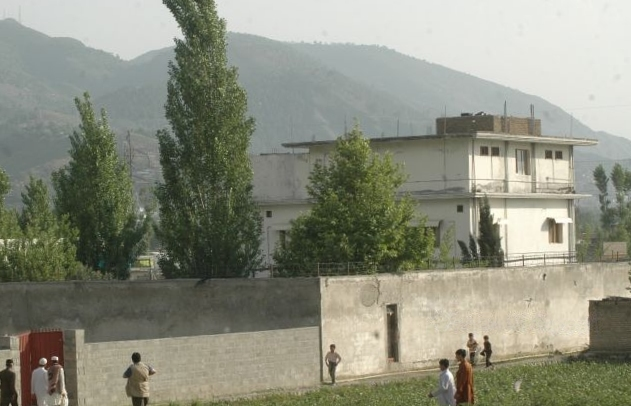
Osama bin Laden's compound in the aftermath of the raid by the U.S. military

On 2 May 2011, the house of Osama bin Laden was invaded by the U.S. military in Bilal Town and he was killed.
