= Abu Faraj al-Libbi =

Libyan member of al-Qaeda (born 1970)

Abu Faraj al-Libi
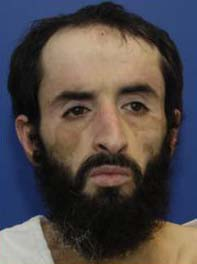
- Born: Mustafa Faraj Muhammad Muhammad Masud al-Jadid al-Uzaybi; November 1, 1970 (age 56); Tripoli, Libya
- Arrested: May 2, 2005; Near Peshawar, Pakistan; Pakistani ISI
- Detained at: CIA black sites, Guantanamo Bay detention camps
- ISN: 10017
- Status: Still held in Guantanamo

Abu Faraj al-Libi (/ˈɑːbuː ˈfɑːrɑːdʒ æl ˈliːbi/ AH-boo FAH-rahj al LEE-bee; أبو الفرج الليبي; also transliterated al-Libbi) is an assumed name or nom-de-guèrre of Mustafa Faraj Muhammad Muhammad Masud al-Jadid al-Uzaybi (born 1 November 1970), a Libyan alleged to be a senior member of the al-Qaeda terrorist organization. He was arrested by Pakistan's Inter-Services Intelligence (ISI) on May 2, 2005, in Mardan (30 mi (48 km) north of Peshawar). Finding al-Libi was a joint effort of the Central Intelligence Agency's (CIA) Special Activities Division and Pakistani Special Forces.

Since September 2006, al-Libi has been held in American military custody in the Guantanamo Bay detention camp, having previously been held at a secret location.

According to the US Office of the Director of National Intelligence, he served as the third in command of al-Qaeda, from the 2003 capture of Khalid Sheikh Mohammed to his own capture in 2005.

== Background ==
In approximately 2000, al-Libi was living in the Karte Parwan district of Kabul, Afghanistan.

In August 2004, Pakistani officials stated that al-Libi had become "number three" in al-Qaeda as "director of operations", a role once filled by Khalid Sheikh Mohammed.

Upon al-Libi's arrest on May 2, 2005, U.S. and Pakistani authorities continued to claim him as the third most important figure in al-Qaeda. According to the BBC and Voice of America (VOA) reports, he was riding pillion on a motorbike when he and his driver were ambushed by Pakistani agents, some of whom were wearing burqas. A VOA reporter from Mardan said that while being apprehended, al-Libi tried to destroy a notebook, which U.S. agents took and have tried to decode.

U.S. agents had been trying to find al-Libi as a link to finding Osama bin Laden. After they intercepted a mobile phone call made by him, they targeted his location to a busy road a quarter of a mile away on the outskirts of Mardan, about 75 mi (121 km) northwest of Islamabad, and tipped-off Pakistani authorities. Plainclothes Pakistani agents arrived in Mardan and waited for him to arrive.

Abu Faraj al-Libi was identified by Pakistani authorities as the main planner of the 2006 transatlantic aircraft plot. He is also a suspect in two assassination attempts against Pakistani President General Pervez Musharraf. According to The New York Times, "Mr. Libbi's suspected accomplice in those attacks was a well-known Pakistani militant named Amjad Farooqi, who was also implicated in the murder of the 'Wall Street Journal' reporter Daniel Pearl in February 2002. Mr. Farooqi was killed last September in a shootout with security forces in southern Pakistan."

In the early reporting of this capture, there was confusion between the names and identities of Abu Faraj al-Libi and another wanted al-Qaeda fugitive, Anas al-Liby. Al-Libi is not a surname, but an adjective, meaning the Libyan. Such adjectives of nationality are used in nicknames, and sometimes to resolve ambiguity; they often have several alternative English transliterations.

Scholars at the Brookings Institution, led by Benjamin Wittes, listed the captives still held in Guantanamo in December 2008, according to whether their detention was justified by certain common allegations:

- Abu Faraj Libi was listed as one of the captives who was a member of the "al Qaeda leadership cadre".
- Abu Faraj Libi was listed as one of the "82 detainees made no statement to CSRT or ARB tribunals or made statements that do not bear materially on the military's allegations against them."

== Guantanamo Review Task Force ==
On January 21, 2009, the day he was inaugurated, United States President Barack Obama issued three executive orders related to the detention of individuals in Guantanamo Bay detention camp. That new review system was composed of officials from six departments, where the OARDEC reviews were conducted entirely by the Department of Defense. When it reported back, a year later, the Guantanamo Review Task Force classified some individuals as too dangerous to be transferred from Guantanamo, even though there was insufficient evidence to justify charging them. On April 9, 2013, that document was made public after a Freedom of Information Act request. Abu Faraj al-Libi was one of the 71 individuals deemed unable to be charged due to insufficient evidence, but too dangerous to release. Obama said those deemed unable to be charged due to insufficient evidence, but too dangerous to release would start to receive reviews from a Periodic Review Board.

== Periodic Review Board ==
The first review was not convened until November 20, 2013. Al-Libi was denied approval for transfer on September 16, 2016.

== Lawsuit against MI5 and MI6 in UK ==
Al-Libbi commissioned barrister Rachel Toney to file a lawsuit against UK's MI5 and MI6. Al-Libbi accuses them of being part of the torture he received during his captivity by the Central Intelligence Agency. The lawsuit is held under exclusion of the public due to secret information. The office of his barrister was searched in January 2026. The Government of the United Kingdom described this as a "serious abuse of power" and apologized in March 2026.
