= Hassan Ghul =

Member of al-Qaeda

- Born: 1976 or 1977; Medina, Saudi Arabia or Sangrar, Sindh, Pakistan
- Died: 1 October 2012; North Waziristan, Pakistan
- Other names: Mustafa Hajji Muhammad Khan (birth name), The Gatekeeper
- Military career
- Allegiance: Al-Qaeda
- Branch: Al-Qaeda central
- Known for: Being the courier to high ranking commander in Al-Qaeda

Hassan Ghul (Arabic: حسان غول), born Mustafa Hajji Muhammad Khan (1976/1977 – 1 October 2012), was a Pakistani member of al-Qaeda who revealed the kunya of Osama bin Laden's messenger, which eventually led to Operation Neptune Spear and the death of Osama Bin Laden. Ghul was an ethnic Pashtun whose family was from Waziristan. He was designated by the Al-Qaida and Taliban Sanctions Committee of the Security Council in 2012.

Captured by Kurdish Peshmerga forces in Iraqi Kurdistan and turned over to American intelligence in early 2004, Ghul was said to have served as anywhere from a courier who delivered messages for al-Qaeda members to a high-ranking associate of either Osama bin Laden, Abu Musab al-Zarqawi, or Khalid Sheikh Mohammed.

He was held at a CIA black site for two years. It was during this time of detainment in early 2004, but before he was subjected to torture, that Ghul listed al-Kuwaiti as a close associate of bin Laden. CIA records show that Ghul was not the first source of the name "al-Kuwaiti," which was also provided in 2002 by another detainee, Abu Zubair al-Ha'ili, who was being held by a foreign government.

In 2006, Ghul was transferred to the custody of Pakistan's Inter-Services Intelligence, which released him in 2007. Ghul was killed by a CIA drone strike in North Waziristan in October 2012.

== History ==
Ghul was born in either 1976 or 1977 in either Medina, Saudi Arabia or the village of Sangrar, Sindh, Pakistan. Ghul was mentioned in the 9/11 Commission report, where he was stated to have led three people, including Mushabib al-Hamlan, to a guesthouse run by Abu Zubaydah.

He was captured on January 23, 2004 by Kurdish security forces at a border crossing to Iran near Kalar after they confirmed Hassan's identity with a photograph emailed to CIA officials. There are contradicting claims that he was caught entering Iraq to bring al-Zarqawi money and bomb schematics or that he was caught leaving Iran bringing al-Zarqawi's progress report on suicide bombings into Iraq.

Ghul was carrying a USB flash drive and two CDs, one allegedly including a 17-page progress report believed to have been written by al-Zarqawi, claiming responsibility for suicide attacks in Iraq. US Intelligence officials have contradicted the accepted story, stating that the progress report was instead found in an abandoned safehouse in Baghdad. In addition, the US military provided the media with "photocopies of the original handwritten Arabic letter" which were then translated, muddying the claim that it had been a computer document. A notebook in his satchel also revealed a number of names and phone numbers of suspected associates.

Kurdish forces immediately turned Ghul over to the American military, and he was interrogated while still in the country.

== Statements about his capture ==
Following his capture, Fox News reported that he had been an al-Qaeda member since the very beginning of the group, at least ten years earlier, and was widely known as "The Gatekeeper" in terrorist circles, although no corroboration or other sources have supported these claims. There have been similarly unreferenced suggestions in the media that Ghul played a role in the 1998 US Embassy bombings in Africa.

Three days after his capture, Ghul was mentioned in a speech by President George W. Bush:

Just yesterday – not yesterday – just last week, we made further progress in making America more secure when a fellow named Hassan Ghul was captured in Iraq. Hassan Ghul was a – reported directly to Khalid Shaik Muhammad, who was the mastermind of the September the 11th attacks. He was a killer. He was moving money and messages around South Asia and the Middle East to other al-Qaeda leaders. He was a part of this network of haters that we're dismantling. Our intelligence officers did a good job. He was captured in Iraq where he was helping al-Qaeda to put pressure on our troops. There is one less enemy we have to worry about with the capture of Hassan Ghul.

Six days after his capture, U.S. Lieutenant General Ricardo Sanchez referred to Ghul stating "the capture of Ghul is pretty strong proof that al-Qaida is trying to gain a foothold [in Iraq] to continue their murderous campaigns." CIA Director George Tenet mentioned Ghul in his testimony to the Senate Select Committee on Intelligence as an al-Qaeda member who would "never again threaten the American people", after allegedly being "sent to case Iraq for an expanded al-Qaeda presence there." Columnist William Safire claimed it was a "smoking gun" that proved a link between Iraq and al-Qaeda.

Ghul then became a ghost detainee, his very existence was unacknowledged. In June 2007, he was one of 39 people cited in a joint release by HRW, Cageprisoners, Center for Constitutional Rights and the New York University School of Law as prisoners who have not been accounted for, and are likely held in secret CIA Black sites.

== Release and death ==
In 2006, two and a half years after his capture, Ghul was transferred to a secret Pakistani prison system, where he was held alongside British suspect Rangzieb Ahmed. The two spoke to each other, and Ghul told him that he was held at a secret CIA location for two and a half years and had also passed through Morocco. He was again transferred to an unknown location in January 2007. Ghul was released by the Pakistanis in 2007. He was thought to have rejoined militants and returned to the battlefield. For some time his whereabouts were unknown, but Ghul was eventually killed by a US drone strike on October 1, 2012. The National Security Agency (NSA) deployed an arsenal of cyber-espionage tools, secretly seizing control of laptops, siphoning audio files and other messages, and tracking radio transmissions to find Ghul. After intercepting an e-mail from Ghul's wife, the NSA was able to locate Ghul and handed over the information to the Central Intelligence Agency which employed a drone to kill Ghul.
