= Osama bin Laden's compound in Abbottabad =

Former mansion in Pakistan

Osama bin Laden's compound
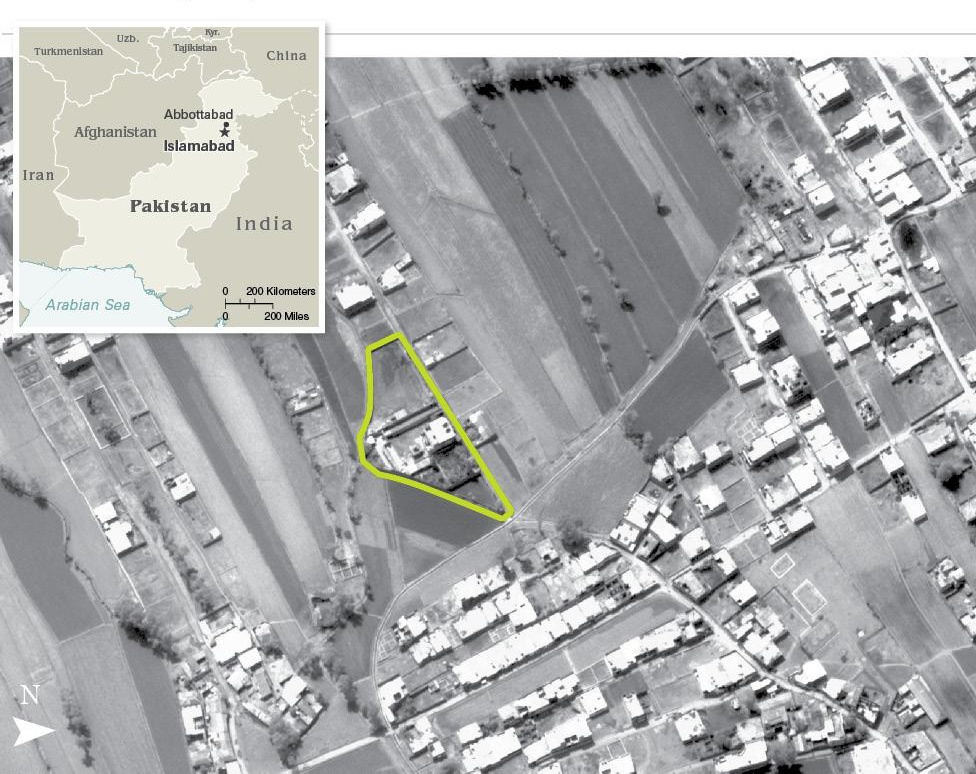
- View of the compound from the east (2011)
- Interactive map
- Alternative names: Waziristan Haveli

General information
- Status: Demolished
- Type: Compound
- Location: Bilal Town, Abbottabad, Pakistan
- Coordinates: 34°10′9.6″N 73°14′32.8″E
- Elevation: 1,260 m (4,130 ft)
- Construction started: 2003
- Completed: 2005
- Demolished: 26 February 2012
- Cost: US$250,000–1,000,000+ (disputed) (Rs. 21.25–85 million)
- Client: Osama Bin Laden
- Owner: Abu Ahmed al-Kuwaiti

Height
- Roof: 8.76 m (28 ft 9 in)

Technical details
- Floor count: 3
- Floor area: 3,500 m^{2} (38,000 sq ft)

Design and construction
- Architecture firm: Modern Associates

Osama bin Laden's compound, known locally as the Waziristan Haveli (Urdu: وزیرستان حویلی, romanized: Wazīristān Havelī, lit. 'Waziristan Mansion'), was a large, upper-class house within a walled compound used as a safe house for militant leader Osama bin Laden, who was shot and killed there by US forces on 2 May 2011. The compound was located at the end of a dirt road 1,300 metres (3/4 mile) southwest of the Pakistan Military Academy in Bilal Town, Abbottabad, Khyber Pakhtunkhwa, Pakistan, a suburb housing many retired military officers. Bin Laden was reported to have evaded capture by living in a section of the house for at least five years, having no Internet or phone connection, and hiding away from the public, who were unaware of his presence.

Completed in 2005, the main buildings in the compound lay on a 3,500-square-metre (38,000 sq ft) plot of land, much larger than those of nearby houses. Around its perimeter ran 3.7-to-5.5-metre-high (12 to 18 ft) concrete walls topped with barbed wire, and there were two security gates. The compound had very few windows. Little more than five years old, the compound's ramshackle buildings were badly in need of repainting. The grounds contained a well-kept vegetable garden, rabbits, some 100 chickens, and a cow. The house itself did not stand out architecturally from others in the neighbourhood, except for its size and exaggerated security measures; for example, the third-floor balcony had a 2.13-metre (7 ft) privacy wall. Photographs inside the house showed excessive clutter and modest furnishings. After the American mission, there was extensive interest in and reporting about the compound and its design. To date, the Pakistani government has not responded to any allegations as to who had built the structure.

After the September 11 attacks in 2001, the US searched for bin Laden for nearly 10 years. By tracking his courier Abu Ahmed al-Kuwaiti to the compound, US officials surmised that bin Laden was hiding there. During a raid on 2 May 2011, 24 members of the United States' Naval Special Warfare Development Group arrived by helicopter, breached a wall using explosives, and entered the compound, finding and killing bin Laden. The Pakistani government demolished the structure in February 2012.

== Architecture ==
Diagram of the compound

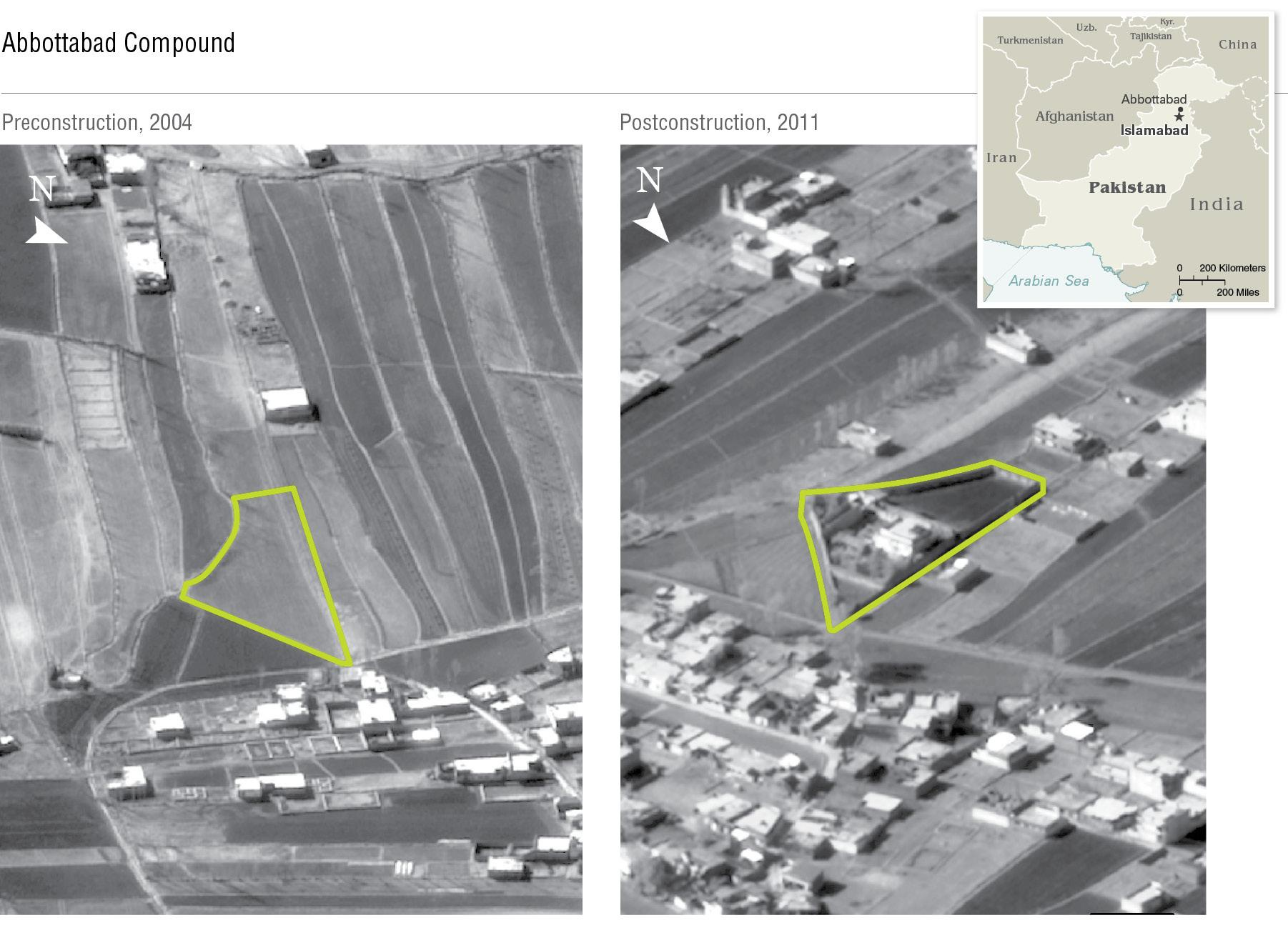
Left photo taken in 2004; right photo taken in 2011

In the urban setting, the architecture of the bin Laden hideout was described by an architect as "surprisingly permanent – and surprisingly urban" and "sure to join Saddam Hussein's last known address among the most notorious examples of hideout architecture in recent memory". The compound was fortified with many safeguard features intended to confuse would-be invaders, and US officials described the compound as "extraordinarily unique". The Associated Press identified the owner as Abu Ahmed al-Kuwaiti, who purchased the vacant land for the complex in 2004 and four adjoining lots between 2004 and 2005 for the equivalent of US$48,000.

Constructed between 2003 and 2005, the three-story structure was located on a dirt road four kilometres (2 1/2 mi) northeast of the city centre of Abbottābad. The local architect for the project said it was only built and planned for a two-story structure and that the third floor (where bin Laden lived) was built afterwards in an illegal construction. While the compound was assessed by US officials at a value of US$1 million, local real estate agents assessed the property value at US$250,000. Intelligence reports indicated that bin Laden may have moved into the complex on 6 January 2006.

On a plot of land much larger than those of nearby houses, it was surrounded by 5.5-metre (18 ft) concrete walls topped with barbed wire. Apart from its size, it did not stand out from others in the neighborhood and it was difficult to see from a distance. The compound walls were higher than usual in the neighbourhood, although nearly all houses in Bilal Town have barbed wire. There were no phones or Internet wires running into the compound. Security cameras were found, and aerial photographs showed several satellite dishes. There were two security gates and the third-floor balcony had a two-metre (6 1/2 ft) privacy wall. The compound measured 3,500 square metres (38,000 sq ft) in size, and had relatively few windows.

The compound was known as Waziristan Haveli (Urdu: وزیرستان حویلی) by the local residents. The compound's casual name referred to Waziristan, a region in Pakistan, and a haveli, which means "mansion". It was owned by a transporter from Waziristan; bin Laden previously spent time in the Waziristan area of Pakistan.

=== Furnishings ===
The house where the bin Laden family lived on the two upper floors was large and modestly furnished. It had "cheap foam mattresses, no air conditioning (but central heating) and old televisions." Several of the bedrooms had an attached kitchen and a bathroom. One of the first floor rooms was furnished with a whiteboard, markers and textbooks, to serve as a classroom for the children in the house, who were home-schooled in Arabic.

=== Food ===
The men of the house known to the neighbours would frequently visit the local shops. They would buy enough food to feed ten people, and purchased "the best brands—Nestle milk, the good-quality soaps and shampoos", Pepsi and Coca-Cola. The food found at the house by the Pakistani authorities was basic, such as dates, nuts, eggs, olive oil and dried meat. The men would visit Rasheed's corner store, about a minute's walk from the house, with young children for whom they bought sweets and soft drinks. They also purchased bread from a local bakery.

Rabbits, 100 chickens and a cow were reared on the compound grounds. A vegetable garden at the back of the house was well-kept, and Shamraiz, a neighbouring farmer, was paid to plant vegetables about twice a year. Days before the May 2011 raid, Shamraiz was called to plough additional ground in the compound using a tractor. He never went inside the house itself.

The compound had an adjacent grazing area that hosted cows and a buffalo as well as a deep water well, possibly allowing it a water supply separate from the local municipality. There was a small garden on the north side of the house that included poplar trees. A farmer's field growing cabbages and potatoes surrounded the compound on three sides, and wild cannabis plants grew up to the side of the compound.

== CIA cache of computer files ==
In November 2017, the CIA publicly released the contents of a cache of nearly 470,000 computer files (with a total size of 258 gigabytes) discovered on 183 separate devices during the Abbottabad Compound raid (that resulted in bin Laden's death) by Navy SEALs, giving the world a glimpse into the home life of bin Laden, his family, and his closest allies.

Among the files discovered were a diary of bin Laden's movements and thoughts regarding the state of al-Qaeda, several videos of beheadings, a 19-page report about al-Qaeda's links to Iran, and a video of Osama bin Laden's son, Hamza, at his wedding (the first images of Hamza since his childhood). There were a number of US-produced documentaries about bin Laden, including Morgan Spurlock's Where in the World is Osama bin Laden? and CNN's In the Footsteps of bin Laden.

The cache also included typical internet-browsing and pirated content, including home videos, cat videos, clip art, a video called "HORSE_DANCE", wildlife documentaries, a copy of Charlie Bit My Finger, the animated films Ice Age: Dawn of the Dinosaurs, Shrek Forever After, and Antz, episodes of Buzz Lightyear of Star Command, Jackie Chan Adventures, Tom and Jerry, and Case Closed, and copies of the video games Final Fantasy VII, Devil May Cry, Counter-Strike, Half-Life, and Resident Evil 2. The files may have come from other residents of the compound (of which there were believed to be 20) as well as older users as it is believed that some of the computers on the compound were purchased as used products, and not necessarily bin Laden. There were also, reportedly, several pornographic video games and videos, although the CIA has not released specifics and withheld certain titles, citing copyright concerns.

== History ==
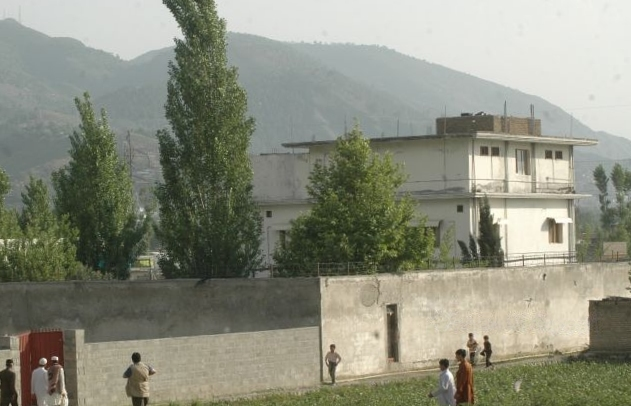
View of the compound, looking north from the south side of a wall turning slightly northeast

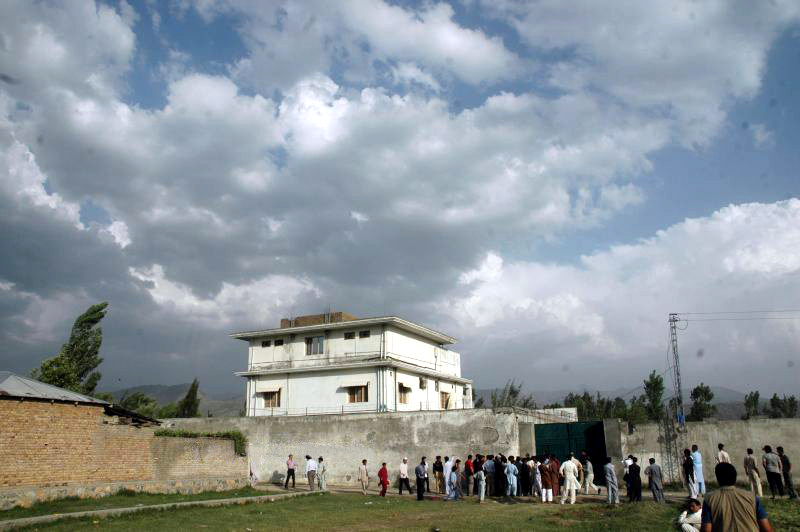
Another view of the compound

Gulf News reported in 2011 that the compound had formerly been used as a safe house by Inter-Services Intelligence (ISI). ISI claimed that Pakistani forces raided the compound in 2003 in an effort to locate Abu Faraj al-Libbi. However, satellite photos taken in 2004—one year after the supposed raid claimed by ISI was to have occurred—show that the site was an empty, undeveloped lot. Intelligence sources indicate that construction on the compound began in the middle of 2005 and that Bin Laden moved into the house around 6 January 2006.

American intelligence officials discovered bin Laden's whereabouts by tracking one of his couriers, Abu Ahmed al-Kuwaiti. Information was collected from Guantánamo Bay detainees who gave intelligence officers al-Kuwaiti's pseudonym and said that he was a protégé of Khalid Sheikh Mohammed. In 2007, US officials discovered the courier's real name, and, in 2009, that he lived in Abbottābad. Using satellite photos and intelligence reports, the CIA surveilled the inhabitants of the compound. In September, the CIA concluded that the compound was "custom built to hide someone of significance" and that it was very likely that bin Laden was residing there. Officials surmised that he was living there with his youngest wife. US Intelligence estimates that bin Laden lived in the compound for five or six years. Bin Laden's wife confirmed to the Pakistani authorities that they had lived in the compound for five years. Prior to moving to the compound, they lived in the village of Chak Shah Muhammad, in the nearby Haripur District, for nearly two and a half years.

=== Operation Neptune Spear ===
Osama bin Laden was killed in Waziristan Haveli on 2 May 2011, shortly after 01:00 local time, by the United States Naval Special Warfare Development Group.

Encounters between the SEALs and the residents took place in the guest house, in the main building on the first floor where two adult males lived, and on the second and third floors where bin Laden lived with his family.

The operation, code-named Operation Neptune Spear, was ordered by United States president Barack Obama and carried out in a US Central Intelligence Agency (CIA) operation by a team of United States Navy SEALs from the United States Naval Special Warfare Development Group (informally known as DEVGRU or by its former name SEAL Team Six) of the Joint Special Operations Command in conjunction with CIA officers. The raid on the compound was launched from Afghanistan. After the raid, US forces took bin Laden's body to Afghanistan for identification, then buried it at sea within 24 hours of his death.

=== After the event ===
Following the raid, the former hideout was placed under the security control of the Pakistan Police. Days after the raid, police allowed reporters and locals to approach the walls of the compound, but kept the doors sealed shut. There was intense media interest in the architecture of the compound. The construction included highly fortified walls made of concrete blocks with three gates, separating the building from the large courtyard and a garden planted with immature fruit trees in front of a collapsed wall.

Pakistan security agencies demolished the compound in February 2012 to prevent Mujahedeen from memorializing it. In February 2013, Pakistan announced plans to build a R265 million ($2.7M) amusement park in the area, including the property of the former hideout.

==== Local residents ====
Locals disclosed details about their interactions with the residents of the compound to an AP journalist in Pakistan. A woman who distributed polio vaccines to the compound said she saw expensive SUVs parked inside. The men received the vaccine and instructed her to leave. A woman in her 70s said one of the men from the hideaway gave her a ride to the market in rainy weather. Her grandchildren played with the children living in the house, and received rabbits as presents. One farmer said, "People were skeptical in this neighborhood about this place and these guys. They used to gossip, say they were smugglers or drug dealers. People would complain that even with such a big house they didn't invite the poor or distribute charity." Present at some neighborhood funerals, two men from the compound were "tall, fair skinned and bearded" and self-identified as cousins from elsewhere in the region. Neighbors said that if a child's ball went over the fence, the men in the compound did not return that ball; instead they paid the child 100–150 rupees (about US$1.10–$1.80), many times its value.

== See also ==
- Osama bin Laden's house in Khartoum
- Manhunt for Osama bin Laden
