= Killing of Osama bin Laden =

2011 U.S. military operation in Abbottabad, Pakistan

- Part of the American manhunt for Osama bin Laden and the war on terror
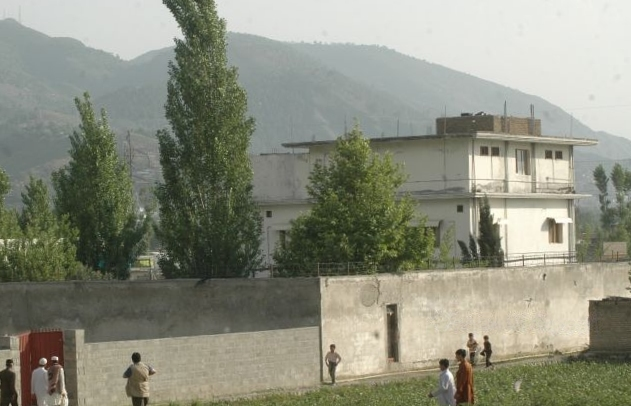
- Osama bin Laden's compound in Abbottabad, May 4, 2011

- Date: May 2, 2011; 15 years ago
- Location: Bilal Town, Abbottabad, Khyber Pakhtunkhwa, Pakistan 34°10′9.6″N 73°14′32.8″E
- Motive: Retaliation for the September 11 attacks in 2001
- Participants: List: Central Intelligence Agency Special Activities Division; U.S. Naval Special Warfare Development Group; 160th Special Operations Aviation Regiment (Airborne); Marine Tactical Electronic Warfare Squadron 4
- Outcome: Death of Osama bin Laden shortly before 1:00 a.m. PKT
- Deaths: List: Osama bin Laden (54); Khalid bin Laden (23); Abu Ahmed al-Kuwaiti (33); Abrar (30), brother of Abu Ahmed al-Kuwaiti; Bushra (age unknown), wife of Abrar

On May 2, 2011, (Note: At the time of the raid, it was early morning of May 2 in Pakistan and late afternoon of May 1 in the United States.) the United States conducted Operation Neptune Spear, in which SEAL Team Six shot and killed Osama bin Laden at his "Waziristan Haveli" in Abbottabad, Pakistan. Bin Laden, who founded al-Qaeda and orchestrated the September 11 attacks, had been the subject of a United States military manhunt since the beginning of the war in Afghanistan, but escaped to Pakistan—allegedly with Pakistani support—during or after the Battle of Tora Bora in December 2001. The mission was part of an effort led by the Central Intelligence Agency (CIA), with the Joint Special Operations Command (JSOC) coordinating the special mission units involved in the raid. In addition to SEAL Team Six, participating units under JSOC included the 160th Special Operations Aviation Regiment (Airborne) and the CIA's Special Activities Division.

Approved by American president Barack Obama and involving two dozen Navy SEALs in two Black Hawk helicopters, Operation Neptune Spear was launched from about 120 miles (190 km) away, near the Afghan city of Jalalabad. The raid took 40 minutes, and bin Laden was killed shortly before 1:00 a.m. Pakistan Standard Time (20:00 UTC, May 1). Three other men, including one of bin Laden's sons, and a woman in the compound were also killed. One U.S. helicopter crashed during the insertion operation without casualties. After the raid, the operatives returned to Afghanistan with bin Laden's corpse for identification and then flew over 850 miles (1,370 km) to the Arabian Sea, where he was buried for a mix of political, practical, and religious reasons.

Al-Qaeda confirmed bin Laden's death through posts made on militant websites on May 6, and vowed to avenge his killing. Additionally, Pakistani militant organizations, including the Tehrik-i-Taliban Pakistan (TTP), vowed retaliation against the United States and against Pakistan for failing to prevent the American raid. The raid, which was supported by over 90% of the American public, was also welcomed by the United Nations, the European Union, and NATO, as well as a large number of international organizations and governments. However, it was condemned by two-thirds of the Pakistani public. Legal and ethical aspects of the killing, such as the failure to capture him alive in spite of him being unarmed, were questioned by Amnesty International. Also controversial was the decision to classify any photographic or DNA evidence of bin Laden's death. There was widespread discontent among Pakistanis with regard to how effectively the country's defences were breached by the United States, and how the Pakistan Air Force failed to detect and intercept any incoming American aircraft.

After the killing of bin Laden, Pakistani prime minister Yusuf Raza Gilani formed a commission led by Senior Justice Javed Iqbal to investigate the circumstances of the assault. The resulting Abbottabad Commission Report reported that the "collective failure" of Pakistan's military and intelligence agencies had enabled bin Laden to hide in the country for nine years. The report was classified by the Pakistani government but was later leaked to and published by Al Jazeera Media Network on July 8, 2013. Various artifacts from the raid are housed at the 9/11 Memorial Museum in New York, with other artifacts such as the American flag which the Navy SEAL team used during the raid being housed at the Obama Presidential Center in Chicago.

== Search for bin Laden ==
Accounts of how bin Laden was located by U.S. intelligence differ. The White House and CIA director John Brennan stated that the process began with a fragment of information unearthed in 2002, resulting in years of investigation. This account states that by September 2010, these leads followed a courier to the Abbottabad compound, where the U.S. began intensive surveillance.

=== Identity of courier ===
Identification of al-Qaeda couriers was an early priority for interrogators at CIA black sites and the Guantanamo Bay detention camp, because bin Laden was believed to communicate through such couriers while concealing his whereabouts from al-Qaeda foot soldiers and top commanders. Bin Laden was known not to use phones after 1998, when the U.S. had launched missile strikes against his bases in Afghanistan in August of that year by tracking an associate's satellite phone.

The U.S. official had stated that by 2002, interrogators had heard uncorroborated claims about an al-Qaeda courier with the kunya Abu Ahmed al-Kuwaiti (sometimes referred to as Sheikh Abu Ahmed from Kuwait). One of those claims came from Mohammed al-Qahtani, a detainee who told interrogators about a man known as Abu Ahmed al-Kuwaiti who was part of the inner circle of al-Qaeda. Later in 2003, Khalid Sheikh Mohammed, the alleged operational chief of al-Qaeda, said he was acquainted with al-Kuwaiti but that the man was not active in al-Qaeda, according to a U.S. official.

According to a U.S. official, in 2004 a prisoner named Hassan Ghul revealed that bin Laden relied on a trusted courier known as al-Kuwaiti. Ghul said al-Kuwaiti was close to bin Laden as well as Khalid Sheikh Mohammed and Mohammed's successor Abu Faraj al-Libbi. Ghul revealed that al-Kuwaiti had not been seen in some time, which led U.S. officials to suspect he was traveling with bin Laden. When confronted with Ghul's account, Mohammed maintained his original story. Abu Faraj al-Libbi was captured in 2005 and transferred to Guantánamo in September 2006. He told CIA interrogators that bin Laden's courier was a man named Maulawi Abd al-Khaliq Jan and denied knowing al-Kuwaiti. Because both Mohammed and al-Libbi had minimized al-Kuwaiti's importance, officials speculated that he was part of bin Laden's inner circle.

In 2007, officials learned al-Kuwaiti's real name, though they said they would disclose neither the name nor how they learned it. Pakistani officials in 2011 stated the courier's name was Ibrahim Saeed Ahmed, from Pakistan's Swat Valley. He and his brother Abrar and their families were living at bin Laden's compound, the officials said. The name Maulawi Abd al-Khaliq Jan appears in the leaked JTF-GTMO detainee assessment for Abu Faraj al-Libbi, but the CIA never found anyone named Maulawi Jan and concluded that the name was an invention of al-Libbi. A 2010 wiretap of another suspect picked up a conversation with al-Kuwaiti. CIA paramilitary operatives located al-Kuwaiti in August 2010 and followed him back to the Abbottabad compound, which led them to speculate it was bin Laden's location.

Al-Kuwaiti and his brother were killed in the May 2, 2011, raid. Afterward, some locals identified the men as Pashtuns named Arshad and Tareq Khan. Arshad Khan was carrying an old, noncomputerized Pakistani identification card, which identified him as from Khat Kuruna, a village near Charsadda in northwestern Pakistan. Pakistani officials have found no record of an Arshad Khan in that area and suspect the men were living under false identities.

The actual story of how Bin Laden's hideout in Abbottabad was discovered has been elaborated by Nelly Lahoud in her book The Bin Laden Papers, in which she relies on her research into the huge number of documents retrieved by the US forces during their raid on the compound. These reveal that although Ibrahim, Bin Laden's security guard, did have a role in receiving messages, there were also several other links of couriers to the outside world, and it was partly the discovery of these that led to Ibrahim and to the compound.

=== Bin Laden's compound ===
The CIA used surveillance photos and intelligence reports to determine the identities of the inhabitants of the Abbottabad compound to which the courier was traveling. In September 2010, the CIA concluded that the compound was custom-built to hide someone of significance, very likely bin Laden. Officials surmised that he was living there with his youngest wife and family.

Built in 2004, the three-story compound was at the end of a narrow dirt road located 4.0 kilometres (2 1/2 miles) northeast of the city center of Abbottabad. Abbottabad is about 160 km (100 mi) from the Afghanistan border on the far eastern side of Pakistan (about 30 km or 20 mi from India). The compound is 1.3 km (3/4 mi) southwest of the Pakistan Military Academy. Located on a plot of land eight times larger than those of nearby houses, the compound was surrounded by a 3.7-to-5.5-metre (12 to 18 ft) concrete wall topped with barbed wire. It had two security gates, and the third-floor balcony had a 2.1-metre-high (7 ft) privacy wall, tall enough to hide the 1.93 m (6 ft 4 in) bin Laden.

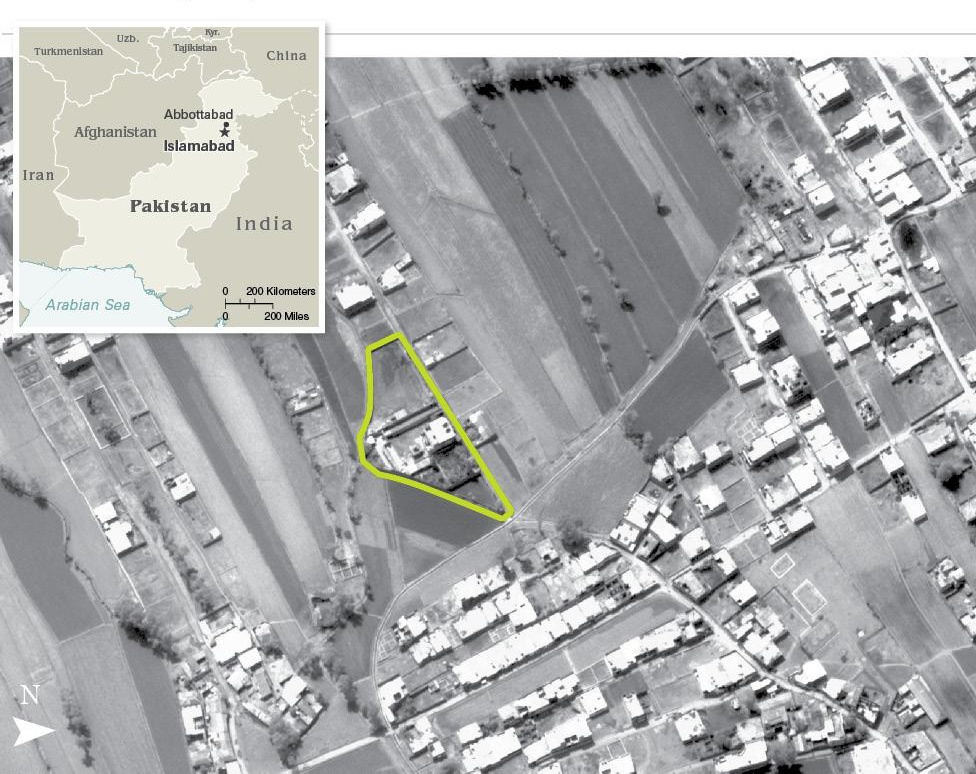
CIA aerial photo of the compound

The compound had no Internet or landline telephone service. Its residents burned their refuse, unlike their neighbors, who set their garbage out for collection. Local residents called the building the Waziristan Haveli, because they believed the owner was from Waziristan. Following the American raid and killing of bin Laden, the Pakistani government demolished the compound in February 2012.

=== Intelligence gathering ===
The CIA led the effort to surveil and gather intelligence on the compound; other critical roles in the operation were played by other United States agencies, including the National Security Agency, National Geospatial-Intelligence Agency (NGA), Office of the Director of National Intelligence (ODNI), and U.S. Defense Department. U.S. officials told The Washington Post that the intelligence-gathering effort "was so extensive and costly that the CIA went to Congress in December [2010] to secure authority to reallocate tens of millions of dollars within assorted agency budgets to fund it."

The CIA rented a home in Abbottabad from which a team staked out and observed the compound over a number of months. The CIA team used informants and other techniques—including a widely criticized fake hepatitis B vaccination program— to gather intelligence on the compound. The safe house was abandoned immediately after bin Laden's death. The U.S. National Geospatial-Intelligence Agency helped the Joint Special Operations Command create mission simulators for the pilots, and analyzed data from an RQ-170 drone before, during and after the raid on the compound. The NGA created three-dimensional renderings of the house, created schedules describing residential traffic patterns, and assessed the number, height and gender of the residents of the compound. Also involved in the intelligence gathering measures were an arm of the National Security Agency known as the Tailored Access Operations group which, among other things, is specialized in surreptitiously installing spyware and tracking devices on targeted computers and mobile-phone networks. Because of the work of the Tailored Access Operations group, the NSA could collect intelligence from mobile phones that were used by al-Qaeda operatives and other "persons of interest" in the hunt for bin Laden.

The CIA used a process called "red teaming" on the collected intelligence to independently review the circumstantial evidence and available facts of their case that bin Laden was living at the Abbottabad compound. An administration official said, "We conducted red-team exercises and other forms of alternative analysis to check our work. No other candidate fit the bill as well as bin Laden did."

Despite what officials described as an extraordinarily concentrated collection effort leading up to the operation, no U.S. spy agency was ever able to capture a photograph of bin Laden at the compound before the raid or a recording of the voice of the mysterious male figure whose family occupied the structure's top two floors.

== Operation Neptune Spear ==
Operation Neptune Spear
- Part of the war on terror and the War in North-West Pakistan
- Map of Pakistan: Abbottabad is 55 km (34 mi) from the capital Islamabad, 269 km (167 mi) from Jalalabad Airfield and 373 km (232 mi) from Bagram Airfield. Bagram is about 1,370 km (850 mi) from the North Arabian Sea (straight line distances, as travel distances significantly more), where the burial took place.
Date	May 1–2, 2011 (1 day)
Location	Compound of Osama bin Laden, Abbottabad, Khyber Pakhtunkhwa, Pakistan 34°10′9″N 73°14′33″E
Result	American victory: End of the Osama bin Laden manhunt

Belligerents
United States	Al-Qaeda

Commanders and leaders
(United States) Barack Obama; (United States) Robert Gates; (United States) Adm. William H. McRaven	Osama bin Laden †; Abu Ahmed al-Kuwaiti †

Strength
79 JSOC and CIA operatives 1 Belgian Malinois (military dog); 5 helicopters	Potential/confirmed combatants: 9 adults (4 men, 5 women) Non-combatants: 13 children

Casualties and losses
1 helicopter crashed (no casualties)	5 killed (4 men, 1 woman); 17 captured (incl. 1 injured)

The official mission code name was Operation Neptune Spear, a direct nod to the U.S. Navy SEAL Trident (the Special Warfare insignia). In Roman mythology, Neptune is the god of the sea, and his weapon is the three-pronged spear, or trident.

The Associated Press reported at the time two U.S. officials as stating the operation was "a kill-or-capture mission, since the U.S. doesn't kill unarmed people trying to surrender," but that "it was clear from the beginning that whoever was behind those walls had no intention of surrendering." White House counterterrorism advisor John O. Brennan said after the raid: "If we had the opportunity to take bin Laden alive, if he didn't present any threat, the individuals involved were able and prepared to do that." CIA director Leon Panetta said on PBS NewsHour: "The authority here was to kill bin Laden. ... Obviously under the rules of engagement, if he in fact had thrown up his hands, surrendered and didn't appear to be representing any kind of threat, then they were to capture him. But, they had full authority to kill him." A U.S. national security official, who was not named, told Reuters that "This was a kill operation." Another official said that when the SEALs were told "We think we found Osama bin Laden, and your job is to kill him," they started to cheer. An article published in Political Science Quarterly in 2016 surveyed various published accounts and interpretations of the objective of the mission and concluded that "the capture option was mainly there for appearance's sake and to fulfill requirements of international law and that everyone involved considered it for all practical purposes a mission to kill."

=== Planning and final decision ===
The CIA briefed Vice Admiral William H. McRaven, the commander of the Joint Special Operations Command (JSOC), about the compound in January 2011. The admiral was both a student and practitioner of special operations, having published a thesis on the subject during the 1990s. His theory held that special operations had the potential to be very effective in achieving their goal if they were organized and commanded by special operations professionals rather than being subsumed into larger military units or operations. He believed that such actions required that "relative superiority" be gained during the operation in question via characteristics such as simplicity, security, rehearsals, surprise, speed, and a clearly-but-narrowly defined purpose.

In this case, McRaven said a commando raid would be fairly straightforward but he was concerned about the Pakistani response. He assigned a captain from the U.S. Naval Special Warfare Development Group (DEVGRU) to work with a CIA team at their campus in Langley, Virginia. The captain, named "Brian", set up an office in the printing plant in the CIA's Langley compound and, with six other JSOC officers, began to plan the raid. Administration attorneys considered legal implications and options before the raid.

In addition to a helicopter raid, planners considered attacking the compound with B-2 Spirit stealth bombers. They also considered a joint operation with Pakistani forces. Obama decided that the Pakistani government and military could not be trusted to maintain operational security for the operation against bin Laden. "There was a real lack of confidence that the Pakistanis could keep this secret for more than a nanosecond", a senior adviser to the president told The New Yorker.

Obama met with the National Security Council on March 14 to review the options; he was concerned that the mission would be exposed and wanted to proceed quickly. For that reason he ruled out involving the Pakistanis. Defense Secretary Robert Gates and other military officials expressed doubts as to whether bin Laden was in the compound, and whether a commando raid was worth the risk. At the end of the meeting, the president seemed to be leaning toward a bombing mission. Two U.S. Air Force officers were tasked with exploring that option further.

The CIA was unable to rule out the existence of an underground bunker below the compound. Presuming that one existed, 32 2,000-pound (910 kg) bombs fitted with JDAM guidance systems would be required to destroy it. With that amount of ordnance, at least one other house was in the blast radius. Estimates were that up to a dozen civilians would be killed in addition to those in the compound. Furthermore, the evidence that bin Laden was dead would have been obliterated. Presented with this information at the next Security Council meeting on March 29, Obama put the bombing plan on hold. Instead he directed Admiral McRaven to develop the plan for a helicopter raid. The U.S. intelligence community also studied an option of hitting bin Laden with a drone-fired small tactical munition as he paced in his compound's vegetable garden.

McRaven hand-picked a team consisting of the most experienced and senior operators from Red Squadron, one of four that make up DEVGRU. Red Squadron was coming home from Afghanistan and could be redirected without attracting attention. The team had language skills and experience with cross-border operations into Pakistan. Almost all the Red Squadron operators had ten or more deployments to Afghanistan.

Without being told the exact nature of their mission, the team performed rehearsals of the raid in two locations in the U.S.—around April 10 at Harvey Point Defense Testing Activity facility in North Carolina where a 1:1 version of bin Laden's compound was built (36°05′57.9″N 76°20′55.7″W), and April 18 in Nevada. The location in Nevada was at 1,200 m (4,000 ft) elevation—chosen to test the effects the altitude would have on the raiders' helicopters. The Nevada mock-up used chain-link fences to simulate the compound walls, which left the U.S. participants unaware of the potential effects of the high compound walls on the helicopters' lift capabilities.

Planners believed the SEALs could get to Abbottabad and back without being challenged by the Pakistani military. The helicopters (modified Black Hawk helicopters) to be used in the raid had been designed to be quiet and to have low radar visibility. Since the U.S. had helped equip and train the Pakistanis, their defensive capabilities were known. (The U.S. had supplied F-16 Fighting Falcons to Pakistan on the condition they were kept at a Pakistani military base under 24-hour U.S. surveillance.)

If bin Laden surrendered, he would be held near Bagram Air Base. If the SEALs were discovered by the Pakistanis in the middle of the raid, Joint Chiefs Chairman Admiral Mike Mullen would call Pakistan's army chief General Ashfaq Parvez Kayani and try to negotiate their release.

When the National Security Council (NSC) met again on April 19, Obama gave provisional approval for the helicopter raid. Worried that the plan for dealing with the Pakistanis was too uncertain, Obama asked Admiral McRaven to equip the team to fight its way out if necessary.

McRaven and the SEALs left for Afghanistan to practice at a one-acre (4,000 m^{2}), full-scale replica of the compound built on a restricted area of Bagram known as Camp Alpha. The team departed the U.S. from Naval Air Station Oceana on April 26 in a C-17 aircraft, refueled on the ground at Ramstein Air Base in Germany, landed at Bagram Air Base, then moved to Jalalabad on April 27.

On 28 April, Admiral Mullen explained the final plan to the NSC. As a measure to bolster the "fight your way out" scenario, Chinook helicopters were to be positioned nearby with additional troops. The greater part of the advisers in the meeting supported going forward with the raid. Vice President Joe Biden laid out the risk of it going wrong and the potential for confrontation with the Pakistanis. According to Deputy National Security Advisor for Strategic Communications Ben Rhodes, "I don't remember it as being firmly against as much as it being about like, 'I'm going to point out the downsides that you need to consider from the perspective of Pakistan' ... Biden was just trying to make sure that Obama had a bunch of room for his decision-making." Gates advocated using the drone-missile option but changed his support the next day to the helicopter-raid plan. Obama said he wanted to speak directly to Admiral McRaven before he gave the order to proceed. The president asked if McRaven had learned anything since arriving in Afghanistan that caused him to lose confidence in the mission. McRaven told him the team was ready and that the next few nights would have a waning moon, good conditions for a raid.

On April 29 at 8:20 a.m. EDT, Obama conferred with his advisers and gave the final go-ahead. The raid would take place the following day. That evening the president was informed that the operation would be delayed one day due to cloudy weather.

On April 30, Obama called McRaven one more time to wish the SEALs well and to thank them for their service. That evening, the president attended the annual White House Correspondents' Association dinner, which was hosted by comedian and television actor Seth Meyers. At one point, Meyers joked: "People think bin Laden is hiding in the Hindu Kush, but did you know that every day from four to five he hosts a show on C-SPAN?" Obama laughed, despite his knowledge of the operation to come.

On May 1 at 1:22 p.m., Panetta, acting on the president's orders, directed McRaven to move forward with the operation. Shortly after 3 p.m., the president joined national security officials in the Situation Room to monitor the raid. They watched night-vision images taken from a Sentinel drone while Panetta, appearing in the corner of the screen from CIA headquarters, narrated what was happening. Video links with Panetta at CIA headquarters and McRaven in Afghanistan were set up in the Situation Room. In an adjoining office was the live drone feed presented on a laptop computer operated by Brigadier General Marshall Webb, assistant commander of JSOC. Secretary of State Hillary Clinton was one of those in the Situation Room, and described it like this: "Contrary to some news reports and what you see in the movies, we had no means to see what was happening inside the building itself. All we could do was wait for an update from the team on the ground. I looked at the President. He was calm. Rarely have I been prouder to serve by his side as I was that day." Two other command centers monitored the raid from the U.S. Department of Defense headquarters at the Pentagon and the U.S. embassy in Islamabad.

According to Adm. McRaven, just before the mission launch Command Sergeant Major Chris Faris quoted the British SAS motto to his men: "Who dares wins."

== Execution of the operation ==
=== Approach and entry ===
Diagram of Osama bin Laden's hideout, showing the high concrete walls that surrounded the compound

The raid was carried out by approximately two dozen heliborne U.S. Navy SEALs from DEVGRU's Red Squadron. For legal reasons (namely that the U.S. was not at war with Pakistan), the military personnel assigned to the mission were temporarily transferred to the control of the civilian Central Intelligence Agency.

The SEALs operated in teams and used weapons including the HK416 assault rifle (their primary weapon), the Mark 48 machine gun for fire support, and the MP7 personal defense weapon, which is used by some SEALs for close quarters and greater silence.

According to The New York Times, a total of "79 commandos and a dog" were involved in the raid. The military working dog was a Belgian Malinois named Cairo. According to one report, the dog was tasked with tracking "anyone who tried to escape and to alert SEALs to any approaching Pakistani security forces". The dog was to be used to help deter any Pakistani ground response to the raid and to help look for any hidden rooms or hidden doors in the compound. Cairo's handler was Will "Cheese" Chesney. Chesney and Cairo had already worked together on and off for several years. Cairo was a combat-wounded-and-rehabilitated veteran dog trained in "scent detection, bite work, command response, desensitization to sound, and physical training." Additional personnel on the mission included a language interpreter, helicopter pilots, plus intelligence collectors, and navigators using highly classified hyperspectral imagers to view the operation.

The SEALs flew into Pakistan from a staging base in the city of Jalalabad in eastern Afghanistan after originating at Bagram Air Base in northeastern Afghanistan. The 160th Special Operations Aviation Regiment (SOAR), a U.S. Army Special Operations Command unit known as the "Night Stalkers," provided the two modified Black Hawk helicopters that were used for the raid itself, as well as the much larger Chinook heavy-lift helicopters that were employed as backups.

The Black Hawks were previously unseen "stealth" versions that flew more quietly and were harder to detect on radar than conventional models; due to the extra weight of the stealth equipment, their cargo was "calculated to the ounce, with the weather factored in."

The Chinooks kept on standby were on the ground "in a deserted area roughly two-thirds of the way" from Jalalabad to Abbottabad, with two additional SEAL teams consisting of approximately 24 DEVGRU operators for a "quick reaction force" (QRF). The Chinooks were equipped with 7.62mm GAU-17/A miniguns and GAU-21/B .50-caliber machine guns and extra fuel for the Black Hawks. Their mission was to interdict any Pakistani military attempts to interfere with the raid. Other Chinooks, holding 25 more SEALs from DEVGRU, were stationed just across the border in Afghanistan in case reinforcements were needed during the operation.

The 160th SOAR helicopters were supported by an array of other aircraft, to include fixed-wing fighter jets and drones. According to CNN, "the Air Force had a full team of combat search-and-rescue helicopters available."

The raid was scheduled for a time with little moonlight so the helicopters could enter Pakistan "low to the ground and undetected." The helicopters used hilly terrain and nap-of-the-earth techniques to reach the compound without appearing on radar and alerting the Pakistani military. The flight from Jalalabad to Abbottabad took about 90 minutes.

According to the mission plan, the first helicopter would hover over the compound's yard while its full team of SEALs fast-roped to the ground. At the same time, the second helicopter would fly to the northeast corner of the compound and deploy the interpreter, the dog and handler, and four SEALs to secure the perimeter. The team in the courtyard was to enter the house from the ground floor.

As they hovered above the target the first helicopter experienced a hazardous airflow condition known as a vortex ring state. This was aggravated by higher-than-expected air temperature and the high compound walls, which stopped the rotor downwash from diffusing. The helicopter's tail grazed one of the compound's walls, damaging its tail rotor, and the helicopter rolled onto its side. The pilot quickly buried the helicopter's nose to keep it from tipping over. None of the SEALs, crew, or pilots were seriously injured in the soft crash landing, which resulted in the helicopter resting against the wall, pitched at a 45-degree angle. The other helicopter landed outside the compound, and the SEALs scaled the walls to get inside. The SEALs advanced into the house, breaching walls and doors with explosives.

=== Entry into the house ===
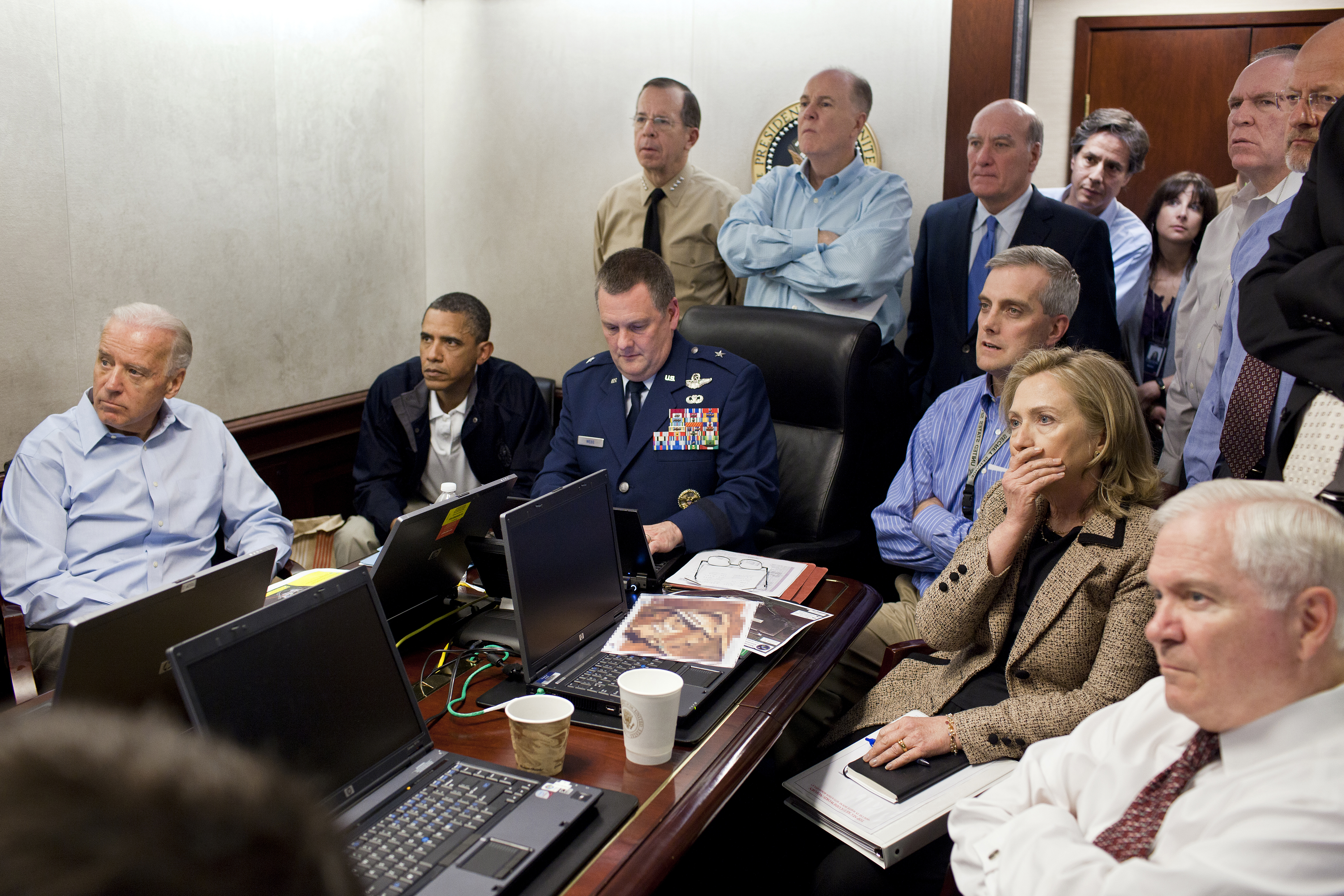
Situation Room: The U.S. national security team, with President Barack Obama, Vice President Joe Biden (left), and Secretary of State Hillary Clinton, gathered in the White House Situation Room to monitor the progress of the operation

The SEALs encountered the residents in the compound's guest house, in its main building on the first floor where two adult males lived, and on the second and third floors where bin Laden lived with his family. The second and third floors were the last section of the compound to be cleared. There were reportedly "small knots of children ... on every level, including the balcony of bin Laden's room."

Osama bin Laden was killed in the raid and initial versions said three other men and a woman were killed as well: bin Laden's adult son Khalid, bin Laden's courier Abu Ahmed al-Kuwaiti, al-Kuwaiti's brother Abrar, and Abrar's wife Bushra.

Conflicting reports of an initial firefight exist. Matt Bissonnette's book, No Easy Day, states that the team were in a "short firefight" before reaching bin Laden. An intelligence official told journalist Seymour Hersh in 2015 that no firefight took place. In the earlier versions, Al-Kuwaiti is said to have opened fire on the first team of SEALs with an AK-47 from behind the guesthouse door, lightly injuring a SEAL with bullet fragments. A short firefight took place between al-Kuwaiti and the SEALs, in which al-Kuwaiti was killed. His wife Mariam was allegedly shot and wounded in the right shoulder. The courier's male relative Abrar was then said to have been shot and killed by the SEALs' second team on the first floor of the main house as shots had already been fired and the SEALs thought that he was armed with a loaded AK-47 (this was later confirmed in the official report). A woman near him, later identified as Abrar's wife Bushra, was in this version also shot and killed. Bin Laden's young adult son is said to have encountered the SEALs on the staircase of the main house, and to have been shot and killed by the second team. An unnamed U.S. senior defense official said only one of the five people killed, Abu Ahmed al-Kuwaiti, was armed. The interior of the house was pitch dark, because CIA operatives had cut the power to the neighborhood. The U.S. military operators wore night-vision goggles that enabled them to see in the dark.

=== Killing of bin Laden ===
The SEALs encountered bin Laden on the third floor of the main building. Bin Laden was unarmed, "wearing the local loose-fitting tunic and pants known as a kurta paijama," which were later found to have €500 and two phone numbers sewn into the fabric.

Bin Laden peered through his bedroom door at the Americans advancing up the stairs, and the lead SEAL fired at him. Reports differ, though agree eventually he was hit by shots to the body and head. The initial shots either missed, hit him in the chest, the side, or in the head. A number of bin Laden's female relatives were near him. According to journalist Nicholas Schmidle, one of bin Laden's wives, Amal Ahmed Abdul Fatah, motioned as if she were about to charge; the lead SEAL shot her in the leg, then grabbed both women and shoved them aside.

Robert J. O'Neill, who later publicly identified himself as one of the SEALs who shot bin Laden, states that he pushed past the lead SEAL, entered through the door and confronted bin Laden inside the bedroom. O'Neill states that bin Laden was standing behind a woman with his hands on her shoulders, pushing her forward. O'Neill immediately shot bin Laden twice in the forehead, then once more as bin Laden crumpled to the floor.

Bissonnette gives a conflicting account of the situation, writing that bin Laden had already been mortally wounded by the lead SEAL's shots from the staircase. The lead SEAL then pushed bin Laden's wives aside, attempting to shield the SEALs behind him in case either woman had an explosive device. After bin Laden staggered back or fell into the bedroom, Bissonnette and O'Neill entered the room, saw the wounded bin Laden on the ground, fired multiple rounds, and killed him. Journalist Peter Bergen investigated the conflicting claims and found that most of the SEALs present during the raid favored Bissonnette's account of the events. According to Bergen's sources, O'Neill did not mention firing the shots that killed bin Laden in the after-action report made following the operation.

The weapon used to kill bin Laden was an HK416 using 5.56mm NATO 77-grain OTM (open-tip match) rounds. The SEAL team leader radioed, "For God and country—Geronimo, Geronimo, Geronimo" and then, after being prompted by McRaven for confirmation, "Geronimo EKIA" (enemy killed in action). Watching the operation in the White House Situation Room, Obama simply said, "We got him."

Various authors have written that there were two weapons in bin Laden's room: an AKS-74U carbine and a Russian-made Makarov pistol. According to his wife Amal, bin Laden was shot before he could reach the AKS-74U. According to the Associated Press, the guns were on a shelf next to the door and the SEALs did not see them until they were photographing the body. According to journalist Matthew Cole, the guns were not loaded and only found later during a search of the third floor.

As the SEALs encountered women and children during the raid, they restrained them with plastic handcuffs or zip ties. After the raid was over, U.S. forces moved the surviving residents outside "for Pakistani forces to discover." The injured Amal Ahmed Abdul Fatah continued to harangue the raiders in Arabic. Bin Laden's 12-year-old daughter Safia was allegedly struck in her foot or ankle by a piece of flying debris.

While bin Laden's body was taken by U.S. forces, the bodies of the four others killed in the raid were left behind at the compound and later taken into Pakistani custody.

=== Conclusion ===
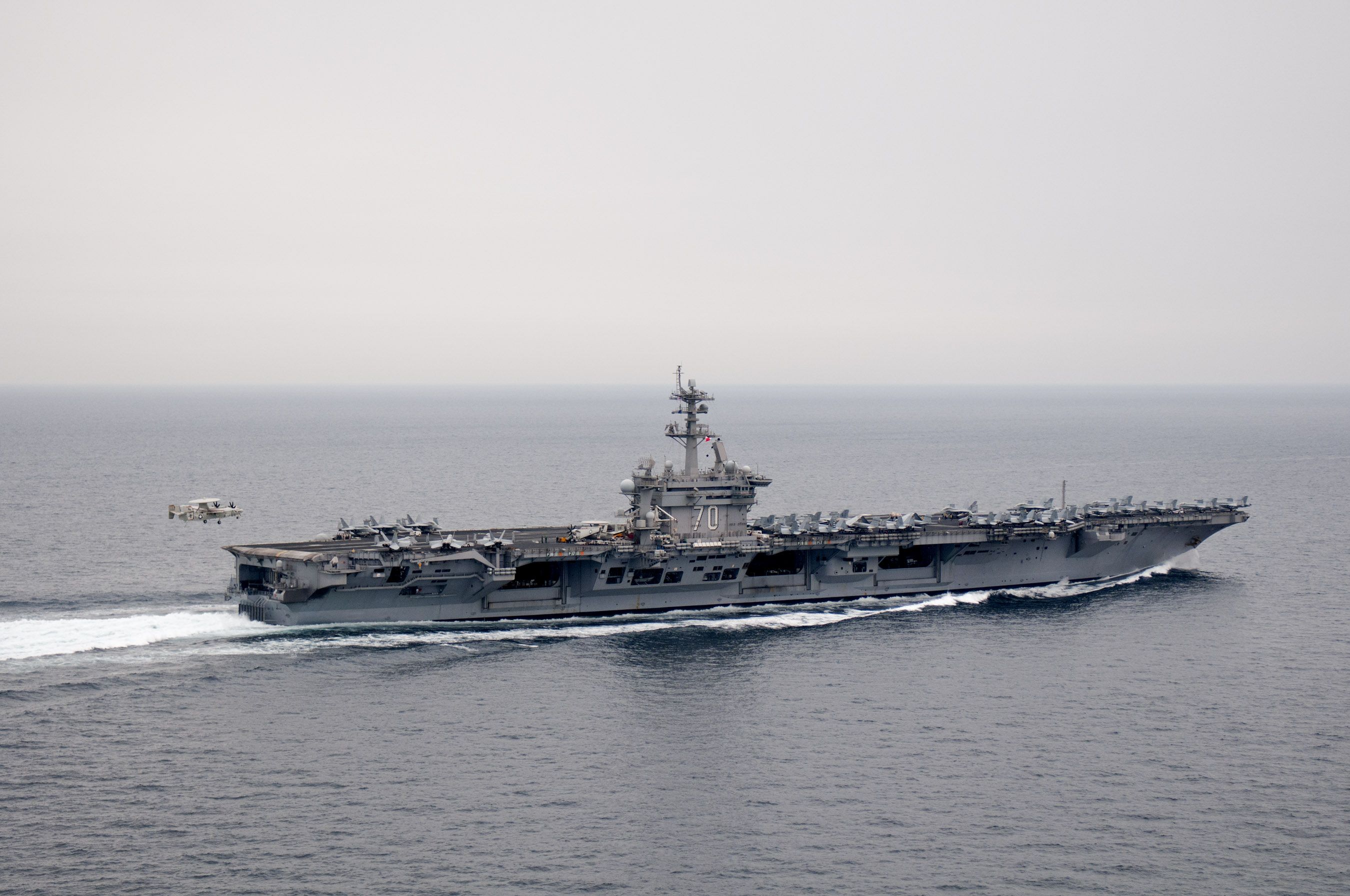
USS Carl Vinson conducting flight operations in the Persian Gulf (April 4, 2011)

The raid was intended to take 40 minutes. The time between the team's entry in and exit from the compound was 38 minutes. According to the Associated Press, the assault was completed in the first 15 minutes.

Time in the compound was spent killing defenders, "moving carefully through the compound, room to room, floor to floor" securing the women and children, clearing "weapons stashes and barricades" including a false door, and searching the compound for information. U.S. personnel recovered three Kalashnikov rifles and two pistols, ten computer hard drives, documents, DVDs, almost a hundred thumb drives, a dozen cell phones, and "electronic equipment" for later analysis. (Note: A National Geographic documentary in September 2020, titled "Bin Laden's Hard Drive", mentioned that Osama bin Laden may have communicated with his associates through secret messages encoded in porn videos.) The SEALs also discovered a large amount of opium stored in the house.

Since the helicopter that had made the emergency landing was damaged and unable to fly the team out, it was destroyed to safeguard its classified equipment, including an apparent stealth capability. The pilot smashed the instrument panel, radio, and the other classified fixtures, and the SEALs demolished the helicopter with explosives. Since the SEAL team was reduced to one operational helicopter, one of the two Chinooks held in reserve was dispatched to carry part of the team and bin Laden's body out of Pakistan.

While the American force gathered intelligence and destroyed the helicopter, a crowd of locals gathered outside the compound, curious about the noise and activity. An Urdu-speaking American officer, through a megaphone, told those gathered that it was a Pakistani military operation, and to remain at a distance.

While the official Department of Defense narrative did not mention the airbases used in the operation, later accounts indicated that the helicopters returned to Bagram Airfield. The body of Osama bin Laden was flown from Bagram to the aircraft carrier Carl Vinson in a V-22 Osprey tiltrotor aircraft escorted by two U.S. Navy F/A-18 fighter jets.

=== Burial of bin Laden ===
According to U.S. officials, bin Laden was buried at sea because no country would accept his remains. Before disposing of the body, the U.S. called the Saudi Arabian government, who approved of burying the body in the ocean. Muslim religious rites were performed aboard Carl Vinson in the North Arabian Sea within 24 hours of bin Laden's death. Preparations began at 10:10 a.m. local time and at-sea burial was completed at 11 a.m. The body was washed, wrapped in a white sheet and placed in a weighted plastic bag. An officer read prepared religious remarks which were translated into Arabic by a native speaker. Afterward, bin Laden's body was placed onto a flat board. The board was tilted upward on one side and the body slid off into the sea.

In Worthy Fights: A Memoir of Leadership in War and Peace, Leon Panetta wrote that bin Laden's body was draped in a white shroud, given final prayers in Arabic and placed inside a black bag loaded with 140 kg (300 lb) of iron chains, apparently to ensure that it would sink and never float. The body bag was placed on a white table at the rail of the ship, and the table was tipped to let the body bag slide into the sea, but the body bag did not slide and took the table with it. The table bobbed on the surface while the weighted body sank.

=== Pakistan–U.S. communication ===
According to Obama administration officials, U.S. officials did not share information about the raid with the government of Pakistan until it was over. Chairman of the Joint Chiefs of Staff Michael Mullen called Pakistan's army chief Ashfaq Parvez Kayani at about 3 am local time to inform him of the operation.

According to the Pakistani foreign ministry, the operation was conducted entirely by the U.S. forces. Pakistan Inter-Services Intelligence (ISI) officials said they were present at what they called a joint operation; President Asif Ali Zardari flatly denied this. Pakistan's foreign secretary Salman Bashir later confirmed that Pakistani military had scrambled F-16s after they became aware of the attack but that they reached the compound after the U.S. helicopters had left.

=== Identification of the body ===
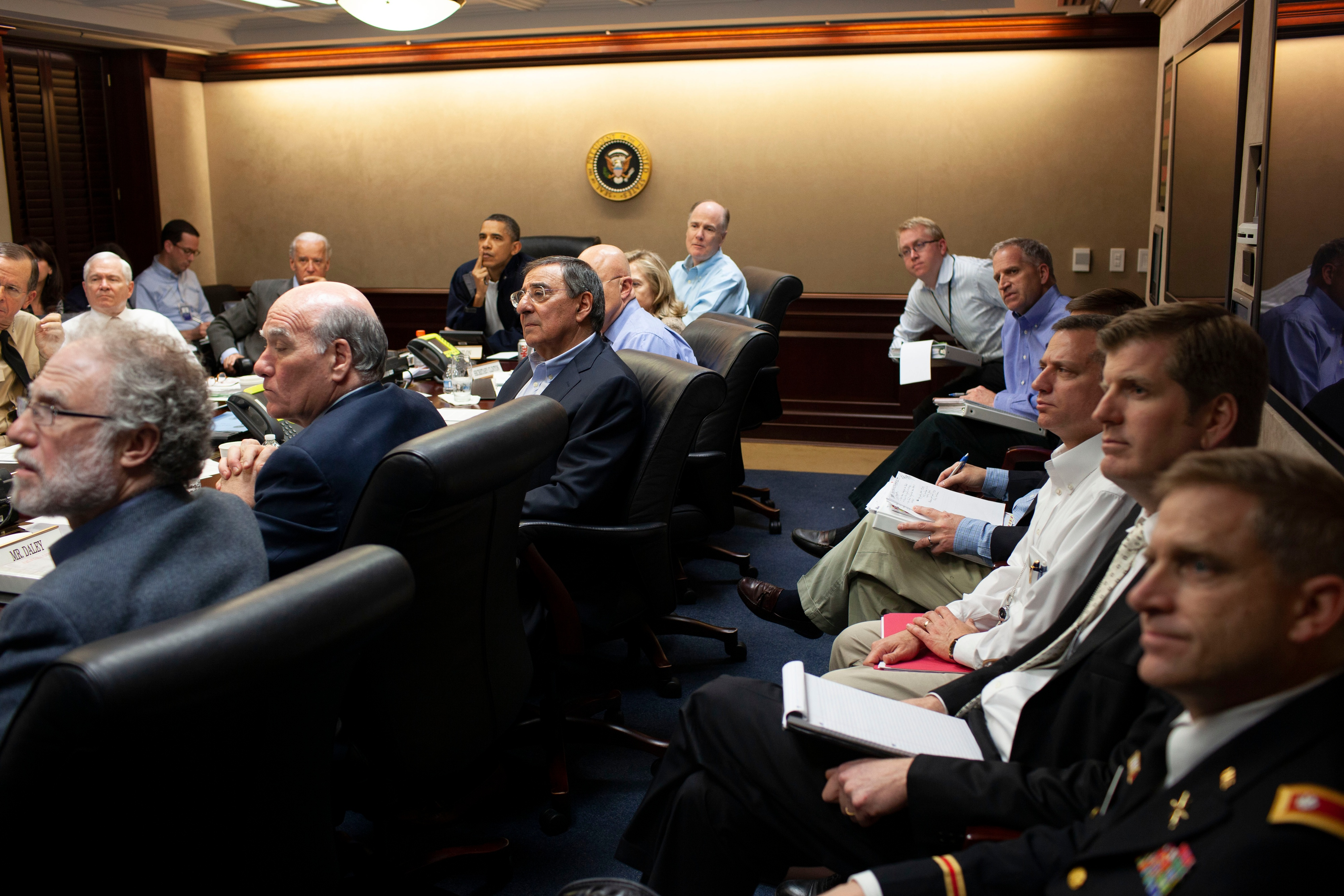
Osama bin Laden's death was reported to President Obama in the Situation Room

U.S. forces used multiple methods to positively identify the body of Osama bin Laden:

- Measurement of the body: Both the corpse and bin Laden were 1.93 m (6 ft 4 in); SEALs on the scene did not have a tape measure to measure the corpse, so a SEAL of known height lay down next to the body and the height was so approximated by comparison. Obama quipped, "You just blew up a $65 million helicopter and you don't have enough money to buy a tape measure?"
- Facial recognition software: A photograph transmitted by the SEALs to CIA headquarters in Langley, Virginia, for facial recognition analysis yielded a 90 to 95 percent likely match.
- In-person identification: One or two women from the compound, including one of bin Laden's wives, identified bin Laden's body. A wife of bin Laden called him by name during the raid, inadvertently assisting in his identification by U.S. military forces on the ground.
- DNA testing: The Associated Press and The New York Times reported that bin Laden's body could be identified by DNA profiling using tissue and blood samples taken from his sister who had died of brain cancer. ABC News stated, "Two samples were taken from bin Laden: one of these DNA samples was analyzed, and information was sent electronically back to Washington, D.C., from Bagram. Someone else from Afghanistan is physically bringing back a sample." A military medic took bone marrow and swabs from the body to use for the DNA testing. According to a senior U.S. Department of Defense official, DNA analysis conducted separately by Department of Defense and CIA labs positively identified Osama bin Laden. DNA samples collected from his body were compared to a comprehensive DNA profile derived from bin Laden's large extended family. Based on that analysis, the DNA is unquestionably his. The probability of a mistaken identity on the basis of this analysis is approximately one in 11.8 quadrillion.
- Inference: Per the same DoD official, from the initial review of the materials removed from the Abbottabad compound the Department "assessed that much of this information, including personal correspondence between Osama bin Laden and others, as well as some of the video footage ... would only have been in his possession."

=== Local accounts ===
Beginning at 12:58 a.m. local time (19:58 UTC), Abbottabad resident Sohaib Athar sent a series of tweets starting with "Helicopter hovering above Abbottabad at 1 a.m. (is a rare event)." By 1:44 a.m. all was quiet until a plane flew over the city at 3:39 a.m. Neighbors took to their roofs and watched as U.S. special operations forces stormed the compound. One neighbor said, "I saw soldiers emerging from the helicopters and advancing towards the house. Some of them instructed us in chaste Pashto to turn off the lights and stay inside." Another man said he heard shooting and screams, then an explosion as a grounded helicopter was destroyed. The blast broke his bedroom window and left charred debris over a nearby field. A local security officer said he entered the compound shortly after the Americans left, before it was sealed off by the army. "There were four dead bodies, three male and one female and one female was injured," he said. "There was a lot of blood on the floor and one could easily see the marks like a dead body had been dragged out of the compound." Numerous witnesses reported that power, and possibly cellphone service, went out around the time of the raid and apparently included the military academy. Accounts differed as to the exact time of the blackout. One journalist concluded after interviewing several residents that it was a routine rolling blackout.

ISI reported after questioning survivors of the raid that there were 17 to 18 people in the compound at the time of the attack and that the Americans took away one person still alive, possibly a bin Laden son. The ISI said that survivors included a wife, a daughter and eight to nine other children, not apparently bin Laden's. An unnamed Pakistani security official was quoted as saying one of bin Laden's daughters told Pakistani investigators that bin Laden had been captured alive, then in front of family members was shot dead by U.S. forces and dragged to a helicopter.

=== Compound residents ===
U.S. officials said there were 22 people in the compound. Five were killed, including Osama bin Laden. Pakistani officials gave conflicting reports suggesting between 12 and 17 survivors. The Sunday Times subsequently published excerpts from a pocket guide, presumably dropped by the SEALs during the raid, containing pictures and descriptions of likely compound residents. Because of a lack of accurate information, some of what follows cannot be verified as true. Later information affirms that there were actually twenty-eight people in the compound at the time of the raid:

- Five adults dead: Osama bin Laden, 54; Khalid, his son by Siham (identified as Hamza in early accounts), 21 or 22; Arshad Khan, a.k.a. Abu Ahmed al-Kuwaiti, the courier, described as the "flabby" one by The Sunday Times, about 34; Abu Ahmed al-Kuwaiti's brother Abrar, about 36; and Bushra, Abrar's wife, 22 or 23.
- Four surviving women: Khairiah, bin Laden's third, Saudi wife a.k.a. Um Hamza, 62; Siham, bin Laden's fourth, Saudi wife a.k.a. Um Khalid, 54; Amal, bin Laden's fifth, Yemeni wife, a.k.a. Amal Ahmed Abdul Fatah, 29 (injured); and Mariam, Abu Ahmad al-Kuwaiti's Pakistani wife (injured).
- Two grown daughters of Osama and Siham: Maryam, 20 or 21, and Sumayya, 18 or 19.
- Five minor children of Osama and Amal: Safia, a daughter, 9; Asiya, a daughter, 8; Ibrahim, a son, 6; Zaynab, a daughter, 4; Husayn, a son, 2.
- Four bin Laden grandchildren from his daughter Khadija who had died in childbirth in Waziristan: grandson Abdullah, 9 or 10; granddaughter A'isha, 8; grandson Usama, 6; and granddaughter Fatima, 3.
- Four children of Ibrahim Saeed who was known as Abu Ahmad al-Kuwaiti and Arshad Khan: daughter Rahma, 9 or 10; son Khalid, 6; son, Ahmad, 3; and son Habib, 18 months.
- Four children of Abrar Saeed: eldest son Muhammad, 7 or less; son Abd al-Rahman, 1-4; daughter Khadija, 1-4; and son Ibrahim, 4 months.

== Aftermath ==
=== Leaks of the news ===
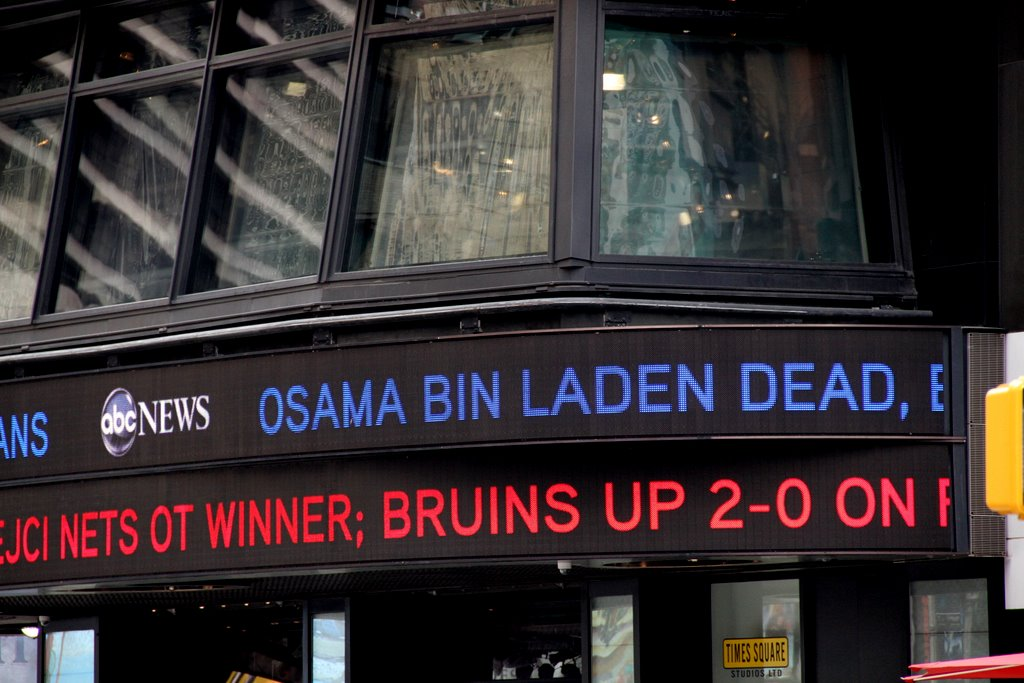
An ABC News digital board in Times Square after Bin Laden's death

Around 9:45 p.m. EDT, the White House announced that the president would be addressing the nation later in the evening. At 10:24:05 p.m. EDT the first public leak was made by Navy Reserve intel officer Keith Urbahn and 47 seconds later by actor and professional wrestler Dwayne Johnson on Twitter. Anonymous government officials confirmed details to the media, and by 11 p.m. numerous major news sources were reporting that bin Laden was dead; the number of leaks were characterized as "voluminous" by David E. Sanger.

=== U.S. presidential address ===
President Obama's address (9:28) Also available: Audio only,

At 11:35 p.m., President Obama appeared on major television networks:

Good evening. Tonight, I can report to the American people and to the world that the United States has conducted an operation that killed Osama bin Laden, the leader of al-Qaeda, and a terrorist who was responsible for the murder of thousands of innocent men, women, and children ...

President Obama recalled the victims of the September 11 attacks. He praised the nearly ten-year-old war against al-Qaeda, which he said had disrupted terrorist plots, strengthened homeland defenses, removed the Taliban government, and captured or killed scores of al-Qaeda operatives. Obama said that when he took office he made finding bin Laden the top priority of the war, and that Bin Laden's death was the most significant blow to al-Qaeda so far but the war would continue. He reaffirmed that the U.S. was not at war against Islam and defended his decision to conduct an operation within Pakistan. He said Americans understood the cost of war but would not stand by while their security was threatened. "To those families who have lost loved ones to al-Qaeda's terror", he said, "justice has been done." This remark book-ended President Bush's statement to a joint session of Congress following the September 11 attacks that "justice will be done."

=== Reactions ===
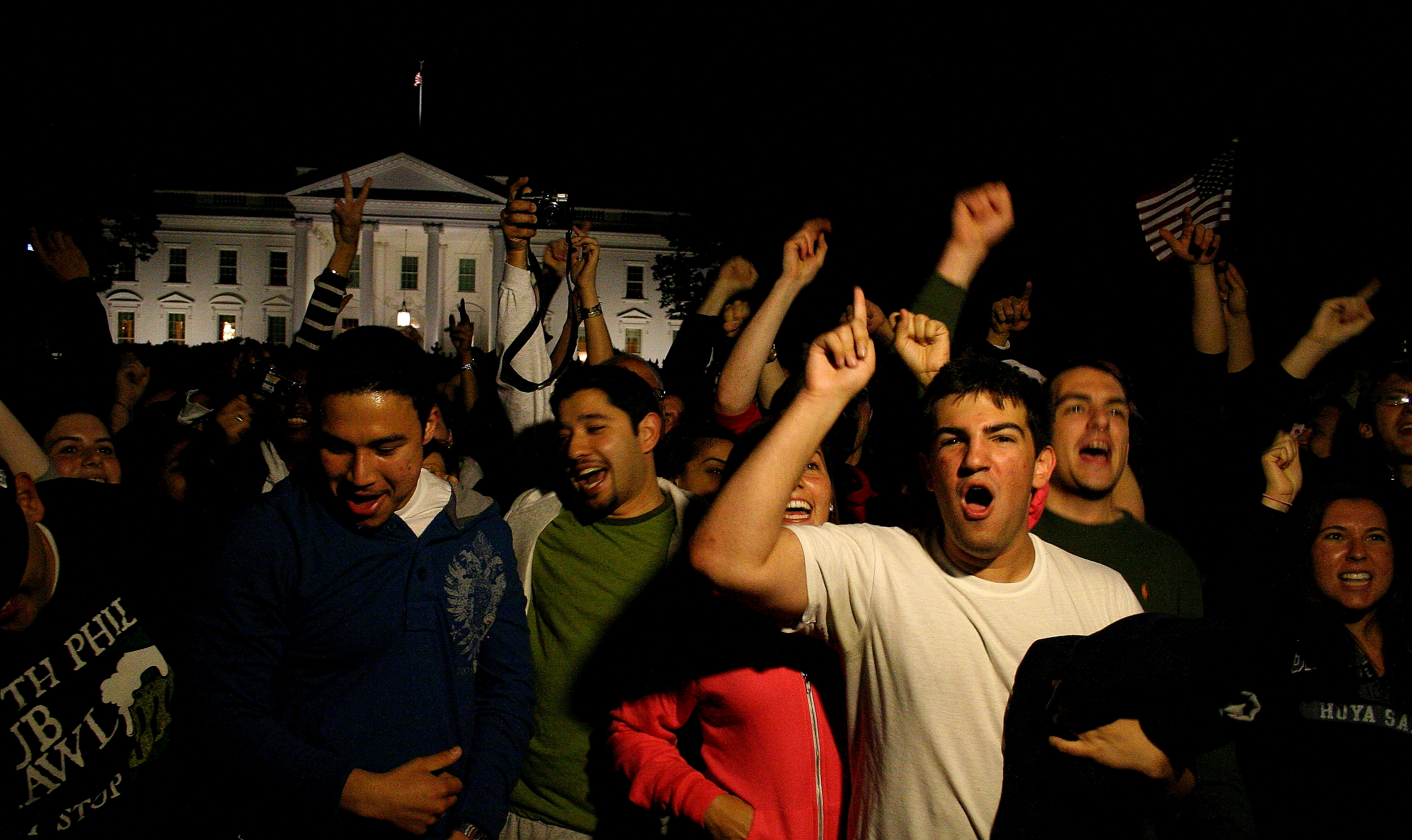
Americans in front of The White House celebrating Osama bin Laden's death

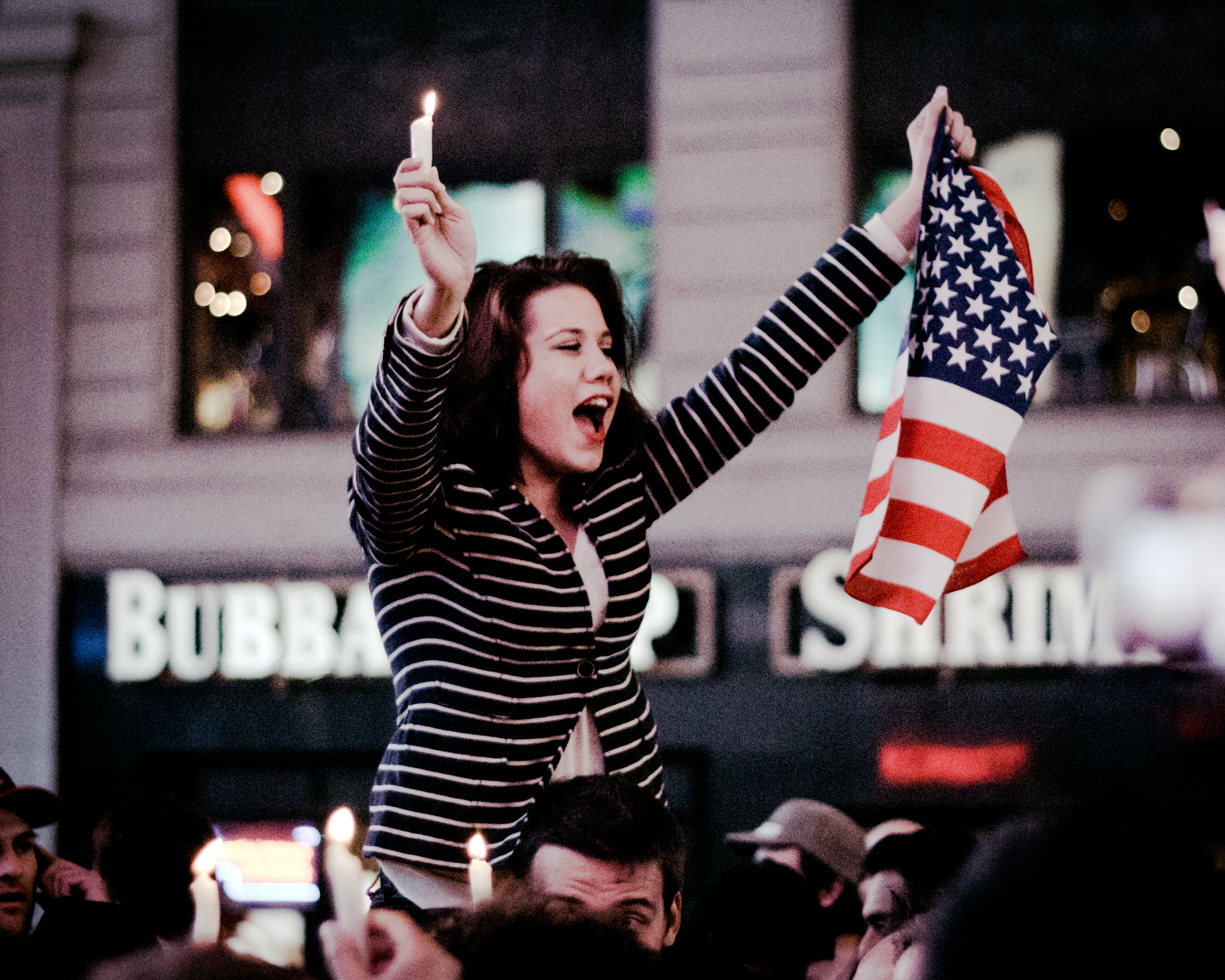
Woman in Times Square celebrating bin Laden's death

Before the official announcement, large crowds spontaneously gathered outside the White House, Ground Zero, The Pentagon, and in New York's Times Square to celebrate. In Dearborn, Michigan, where there is a large Muslim and Arab population, a small crowd gathered outside the City Hall in celebration, many of them of Middle Eastern descent. From the beginning to the end of Obama's speech, 5,000 tweets per second were posted on Twitter. As news of bin Laden's death filtered through the crowd at a nationally televised Major League Baseball game in Philadelphia between rivals Philadelphia Phillies and the New York Mets, "U-S-A!" cheers began. In Tampa, Florida, at the conclusion of a professional wrestling event which was occurring at the time, WWE Champion John Cena announced to the audience that bin Laden had been "caught and compromised to a permanent end," prompting chants while he exited the arena to the march "The Stars and Stripes Forever."

The deputy leader of Egypt's Muslim Brotherhood said that, with bin Laden dead, Western forces should now pull out of Iraq and Afghanistan; authorities in Iran made similar comments. Palestinian Authority leaders had contrasting reactions. Mahmoud Abbas welcomed bin Laden's death, while Ismail Haniyeh, the head of the Hamas administration in the Gaza Strip, condemned what he saw as the assassination of an "Arab holy warrior."

The 14th Dalai Lama was quoted by the Los Angeles Times as saying, "Forgiveness doesn't mean forget what happened. ... If something is serious and it is necessary to take counter-measures, you have to take counter-measures." This was widely reported as an endorsement of bin Laden's killing and was criticized in Buddhist circles, but another journalist cited a video of the discussion to argue that the comment was taken out of context and the Dalai Lama supports killing only in self-defense.

A CBS/The New York Times poll taken after bin Laden's death showed that 16% of Americans feel safer as the result of his death while 60% of Americans of those polled believe killing bin Laden would likely increase the threat of terrorism against the U.S. in the short term.

In India, Minister for Home Affairs P. Chidambaram said that bin Laden hiding "deep inside" Pakistan was a matter of grave concern for India and showed that "many of the perpetrators of the Mumbai terror attacks, including the controllers and the handlers of the terrorists who actually carried out the attack, continue to be sheltered in Pakistan." He also called on Pakistan to arrest them, amidst calls for similar strikes being conducted by India against Hafiz Saeed and Dawood Ibrahim.

=== Freedom of Information Act requests and denials ===
Although the Abbottabad raid has been described in great detail by U.S. officials, no physical evidence constituting "proof of death" has been offered to the public, neither to journalists nor to independent third parties who have requested this information through the Freedom of Information Act. Numerous organizations filed FOIA requests seeking at least a partial release of photographs, videos and DNA test results including The Associated Press, Reuters, CBS News, Judicial Watch, Politico, Fox News, Citizens United, and NPR. On April 26, 2012, Judge James E. Boasberg held that the Department of Defense was not required to release any evidence to the public.

According to a draft report by the Pentagon's inspector general, Admiral William McRaven, the top special operations commander, ordered the Department of Defense to purge from its computer systems all files on the bin Laden raid after first sending them to the CIA. Any mention of this decision was expunged from the final version of the inspector general's report. According to the Pentagon, this was done to protect the identities of the Navy SEALs involved in the raid. The legal justification for the records transfer is that the SEALs were effectively working for the CIA at the time of the raid, which ostensibly means that any records of the raid belong to the CIA. "Documents related to the raid were handled in a manner consistent with the fact that the operation was conducted under the direction of the CIA director," CIA agency spokesman Preston Golson said in an emailed statement. "Records of a CIA operation such as the (bin Laden) raid, which were created during the conduct of the operation by persons acting under the authority of the CIA Director, are CIA records." Golson said it is absolutely false that records were moved to the CIA to avoid the legal requirements of the Freedom of Information Act. The National Security Archive has criticized this maneuver, saying that the records have now gone into a "FOIA black hole":

What the transfer really did was ensure that the files would be placed in the CIA's operational records, a records system that—due to the 1986 CIA Operational Files exemption—is not subject to the FOIA and is a black hole for anyone trying to access the files within. The move prevents the public from accessing the official record about the raid, and bypasses several important federal records keeping procedures in the process.

The United States Defense Department can prevent the release of its own military files citing risks to national security, but that can be contested in court, and a judge can compel the Pentagon to turn over non-sensitive portions of records. The CIA has special authority to prevent the release of operational files in ways that cannot be challenged in federal court. Richard Lardner, reporting for the Associated Press, wrote that the maneuver "could represent a new strategy for the U.S. government to shield even its most sensitive activities from public scrutiny."

The inspector general's draft report also described how former secretary of defense Leon Panetta disclosed classified information to the makers of Zero Dark Thirty, including the unit that conducted the raid and the ground commander's name.

=== Legality ===
==== Under U.S. law ====
Following the attacks of September 11, the U.S. Congress passed the Authorization for Use of Military Force Against Terrorists, which authorized the president to use "necessary and appropriate force against those nations, organizations, or persons" he determines were involved in the attacks. Congresswoman Barbara Lee has initiated several attempts to repeal the authorization. The Obama administration justified its use of force by relying on that resolution, as well as international law set forth in treaties and customary laws of war.

John Bellinger III, who served as the U.S. State Department's senior lawyer during President George W. Bush's second term, said the strike was a legitimate military action and did not run counter to the U.S.' self-imposed prohibition on assassinations:

The killing is not prohibited by the long-standing assassination prohibition in executive order 12333 [signed in 1981], because the action was a military action in the ongoing U.S. armed conflict with al-Qaeda, and it is not prohibited to kill specific leaders of an opposing force. The assassination prohibition does not apply to killings in self-defense.

Similarly, Harold Hongju Koh, Legal Adviser of the U.S. State Department, said in 2010 that "under domestic law, the use of lawful weapons systems—consistent with the applicable laws of war—for precision targeting of specific high-level belligerent leaders when acting in self-defense or during an armed conflict is not unlawful, and hence does not constitute 'assassination.'"

David Scheffer, director of the Northwestern University School of Law Center for International Human Rights, said the fact that bin Laden had previously been indicted in 1998 in the U.S. District Court for the Southern District of New York for conspiracy to attack U.S. defense installations was a complicating factor. "Normally when an individual is under indictment the purpose is to capture that person in order to bring him to court to try him ... The object is not to literally summarily execute him if he's under indictment." Scheffer and another expert stated that it was important to determine whether the mission was to capture bin Laden or to kill him. If the Navy SEALs were instructed to kill bin Laden without trying first to capture him, it "may have violated American ideals if not international law."

==== Under international law ====
In an address to the Pakistani parliament, Pakistan's prime minister Yousaf Raza Gillani said

Our people are rightly incensed on the issue of violation of sovereignty as typified by the covert U.S. air and ground assault on the Osama hideout in Abbottabad. ... The Security Council, while exhorting UN member states to join their efforts against terrorism, has repeatedly emphasized that this be done in accordance with international law, human rights and humanitarian law.

Former Pakistani president Gen. Pervez Musharraf denied a report in The Guardian that his government made a secret agreement permitting U.S. forces to conduct unilateral raids in search of the top three al-Qaeda leaders.

In testimony before the U.S. Senate Judiciary Committee, Attorney General Eric Holder said, "The operation against bin Laden was justified as an act of national self-defense. It's lawful to target an enemy commander in the field." He called the killing of bin Laden "a tremendous step forward in attaining justice for the nearly 3,000 innocent Americans who were murdered on September 11, 2001." Commenting on the legality under international law, University of Michigan Law Professor Steven Ratner said, "A lot of it depends on whether you believe Osama bin Laden is a combatant in a war or a suspect in a mass murder." In the latter case, "you would ... be able to kill a suspect [only] if they represented an immediate threat."

Holder testified that bin Laden made no attempt to surrender, and "even if he had there would be a good basis on the part of those very brave Navy SEAL team members to do what they did in order to protect themselves and the other people who were in that building." According to Anthony Dworkin, an international law expert at the European Council on Foreign Relations, if bin Laden was hors de combat (as his daughter is said to have alleged) that would have been a violation of Protocol I of the Geneva Conventions.

Former Nuremberg prosecutor Benjamin B. Ferencz said it was unclear if bin Laden's killing was justified self-defense or premeditated illegal assassination, and that "killing a captive who poses no immediate threat is a crime under military law as well as all other law," a view also held by legal scholar Philippe Sands.

The UN Security Council released a statement applauding the news of bin Laden's death, and UN secretary-general Ban Ki-moon said he was "very much relieved." Two United Nations Special Rapporteurs issued a joint statement seeking more information regarding the circumstances in which bin Laden was killed and cautioning that "actions taken by States in combating terrorism, especially in high profile cases, set precedents for the way in which the right to life will be treated in future instances."

=== Handling of the body ===
Under Islamic tradition, burial at sea is considered inappropriate when other, preferred forms of burial are available, and several prominent Islamic clerics criticized the decision. Mohamed Ahmed el-Tayeb, the head of Al-Azhar University, Egypt's seat of Sunni Muslim learning, said the disposal of the body at sea was an affront to religious and human values. Scholars like el-Tayeb hold that sea burials can be allowed only in special cases where the death occurred aboard a ship, and that the regular practice should have occurred in this case—the body buried in the ground with the head pointing to Islam's holy city of Mecca.

A stated advantage of a burial at sea is that the site is not readily identified or accessed, thus preventing it from becoming a focus of attention or "terrorist shrine." The Guardian questioned whether bin Laden's grave would have become a shrine, as this is strongly discouraged in Wahhabism. Addressing the same concern, Egyptian Islamic analyst and lawyer Montasser el-Zayat said that if the Americans wished to avoid making a shrine to bin Laden, an unmarked grave on land would have accomplished the same goal.

The Guardian also quoted a U.S. official explaining the anticipated difficulty of finding a country that would accept the burial of bin Laden in its soil. A professor of Islamic Law at the University of Jordan stated burying at sea was permitted if there was nobody to receive the body and provide a Muslim burial, but that "it's neither true nor correct to claim that there was nobody in the Muslim world ready to receive bin Laden's body." On a similar note, Mohammed al-Qubaisi, Dubai's grand mufti, stated:

They can say they buried him at sea, but they cannot say they did it according to Islam. If the family does not want him, it's really simple in Islam: you dig up a grave anywhere, even on a remote island, you say the prayers and that's it. Sea burials are permissible for Muslims in extraordinary circumstances. This is not one of them.

Khalid Latif, an imam who serves as a chaplain and the director of the Islamic Center of New York University, argued that the sea burial was respectful.

Leor Halevi, a professor at Vanderbilt University and the author of Muhammad's Grave: Death Rites and the Making of Islamic Society, explained that Islamic law does not prescribe ordinary funerals for those killed in battle, and pointed to controversy within the Muslim world over whether bin Laden was, as a "mass murderer of Muslims," entitled to the same respect as mainstream Muslims. At the same time, he suggested that the burial could have been handled with more cultural sensitivity.

Omar bin Laden, son of Osama bin Laden, published a complaint on May 10, 2011, that the burial at sea deprived the family of a proper burial.

=== Bin Laden's will ===
After bin Laden's death, it was reported he had left a will written a short time after the September 11 attacks in which he urged his children not to join al-Qaeda and not to continue the Jihad.

=== Release of photographs ===
CNN cited a senior U.S. official as saying three sets of photographs of bin Laden's body exist: photos taken at an aircraft hangar in Afghanistan, described as the most recognizable and gruesome; photos taken from the burial at sea on USS Carl Vinson before a shroud was placed around his body; and photos from the raid itself, which include shots of the interior of the compound as well as three of the others who died in the raid.

CBS Evening News reported that the photo shows that the bullet which hit above bin Laden's left eye blew out his left eyeball and blew away a large portion of his frontal skull, exposing his brain. CNN stated that the pictures from the Afghanistan hangar depict "a massive open head wound across both eyes. It's very bloody and gory." U.S. Senator Jim Inhofe said the photos taken of the body on the Carl Vinson, which showed bin Laden's face after much of the blood and material had been washed away, should be released to the public.

A debate on whether the military photos should be released to the public took place. Those supporting the release argued that the photos should be considered public records, that they are necessary to complete the journalistic record, and that they would prove bin Laden's death and therefore prevent conspiracy theories. Those in opposition expressed concern that the photos would inflame anti-American sentiment in the Middle East.

Obama decided not to release the photos. In an interview aired on May 4 on 60 Minutes, he said: "We don't trot out this stuff as trophies. We don't need to spike the football." Obama said that he was concerned with ensuring that "very graphic photos of somebody who was shot in the head are not floating around as an incitement to additional violence, or as a propaganda tool. That's not who we are." Among Republican members of Congress, Senator Lindsey Graham criticized the decision and said he wanted to see the photos released, while Senator John McCain and Representative Mike Rogers, the chair of the House Intelligence Committee, supported the decision.

On May 11, selected members of Congress (the congressional leadership and those who serve on the House and Senate intelligence, homeland security, judiciary, foreign relations, and armed forces committees) were shown 15 bin Laden photos. In an interview with Eliot Spitzer, Senator Jim Inhofe said that three of the photos were of bin Laden alive for identification reference. Three other photos were of the burial-at-sea ceremony.

The group Judicial Watch filed a Freedom of Information Act request to obtain access to the photos in May 2011, soon after the raid. On May 9, the Department of Defense declined to process Judicial Watch's FOIA request, prompting Judicial Watch to file a federal lawsuit. In 2012, Judge James Boasberg of the U.S. District Court for the District of Columbia issued a ruling denying release of the photographs. In May 2013, a three-judge panel of the U.S. Court of Appeals for the District of Columbia Circuit consisting of Chief Judge Merrick Garland, Senior Judge Harry T. Edwards, and Judge Judith Rogers affirmed the ruling, holding that 52 post-mortem images were properly classified as "top secret" and exempt from disclosure. Judicial Watch filed a petition for a writ of certiorari in August 2013, seeking U.S. Supreme Court review, but in January 2014 the Supreme Court declined to hear the case.

The Associated Press filed an FOIA request for photographs and videos taken during the Abbottabad raid less than one day after bin Laden was killed. The AP also requested "contingency plans for bin Laden's capture, reports on the performance of equipment during the mission and copies of DNA tests" confirming bin Laden's identity. The Defense Department rejected the AP's request for expedited processing, a legal provision to shorten the amount of time to process FOIA requests. The Defense Department rejected the request, and the AP administratively appealed.

=== Alternative accounts ===
==== Seal Target Geronimo ====
A book published in November 2011, Seal Target Geronimo, by Chuck Pfarrer, a former SEAL, contradicted elements of the account as given by U.S. government sources.

As per Pfarrer, the primary helicopters used in the operation were designated Razor 1 and Razor 2. These helicopters, which were used only by elite U.S. special-operations units (namely the U.S. Navy's DEVGRU and the U.S. Army's Delta Force), were colloquially called Ghost Hawks due to their advanced stealth functions. The pilots of both Ghost Hawks each had at least a decade of experience flying stealth helicopters in combat. Razor 1 carried 10 assaulters (including some specially trained as snipers), and two demolitionists with expertise in strategically deploying explosives. Razor 2 also carried a squad of 12 American commandos, including a two-man sniper team that had participated in resolving the 2009 Maersk Alabama hijacking, and a designated artillery observer who was responsible for directing the team's weaponsfire. Pfarrer's account also suggests that the helicopter or helicopters heard hovering in Abbottabad that night were the Chinooks. One, which would have been referred to as the command bird, carried the officers running the operation and all of the members of Red Squadron who were not already assigned to approach the compound via Razors 1 and 2. The second Chinook, which Pfarrer calls the gun platform, was equipped with three M134 Miniguns (Gatling gun-style machine guns), which would be used to provide suppressive fire from the air if need be.

According to Pfarrer, neither helicopter crashed at the beginning of the raid. Instead, the SEALs jumped onto the roof from the hovering Razor 1 helicopter and entered a third-floor hallway from the roof terrace. Osama's third wife, Khairah, was in the hallway, headed towards the SEALs. She was blinded by a strobe light and pushed to the floor as the SEALs went past her. Osama bin Laden stuck his head out of a bedroom door, saw the SEALs, and slammed the door closed. At the same time, Osama's son Khalid bin Laden ran up the stairs to the third floor and was killed with two shots.

Two SEALs broke through the bedroom door. Bin Laden's wife Amal was on the edge of the bed shouting in Arabic at the SEALs, and Osama bin Laden dived across the bed, shoving Amal at the same time, for an AKS-74U kept by the headboard. The SEALs fired four shots at bin Laden; the first missed, the second grazed Amal in the calf also missing bin Laden, and the final two hit bin Laden in the chest and head, killing him instantly. In Pfarrer's account, the total time elapsed from jumping on the roof to Osama bin Laden's death was between 30 and 90 seconds.

Around the same time, snipers in the hovering Razor 2 helicopter shot and killed Abu Ahmed al-Kuwaiti when he came to the door of the guest house firing an AK-47. One SEAL sniper fired two shots at al-Kuwaiti and the other fired two three-round bursts. Two of the snipers' bullets went through al-Kuwaiti and killed his wife who was standing behind him. The Razor 2 team cleared the guest house and then breached their way into the main house with explosives. As the Razor 2 team entered the main house, al-Qaeda courier Arshad Khan pointed his AK-47 gun and was killed with two shots. The SEAL team fired a total of 16 shots, killing Osama bin Laden, Khalid bin Laden, Abu Ahmed al-Kuwaiti, and al-Kuwaiti's wife, Arshad Khan, and wounding Osama bin Laden's wife Amal al-Sadah.

Twenty minutes into the operation, Razor 1 took off from the roof of the main house to reposition to a landing spot outside the compound. As Razor 1 was crossing over the courtyard, both "green unit" flight deck control systems went off line. The helicopter settled slowly, bounced off the ground, and then broke apart as it hit the ground a second time. Both failed green units were removed for later examination.

Media accounts had reported that the plan had been to fast rope to the inner courtyard and to clear the main house from the ground floor up. The helicopter crashed in the outer courtyard with the SEAL team still on board. The SEAL team exited and needed to breach two walls and then into the house. As a result, Osama bin Laden was killed several minutes into the operation. Pfarrer's account differs in that he wrote that a SEAL team was inserted onto the roof of the main house, that Osama bin Laden was killed seconds into the operation, and that the main house was cleared from the top down.

The Pentagon disputed Pfarrer's account of the raid, calling it "incorrect." The U.S. Special Operations Command also disputed Pfarrer's account, saying, "It's just not true. It's not how it happened."

==== No Easy Day ====
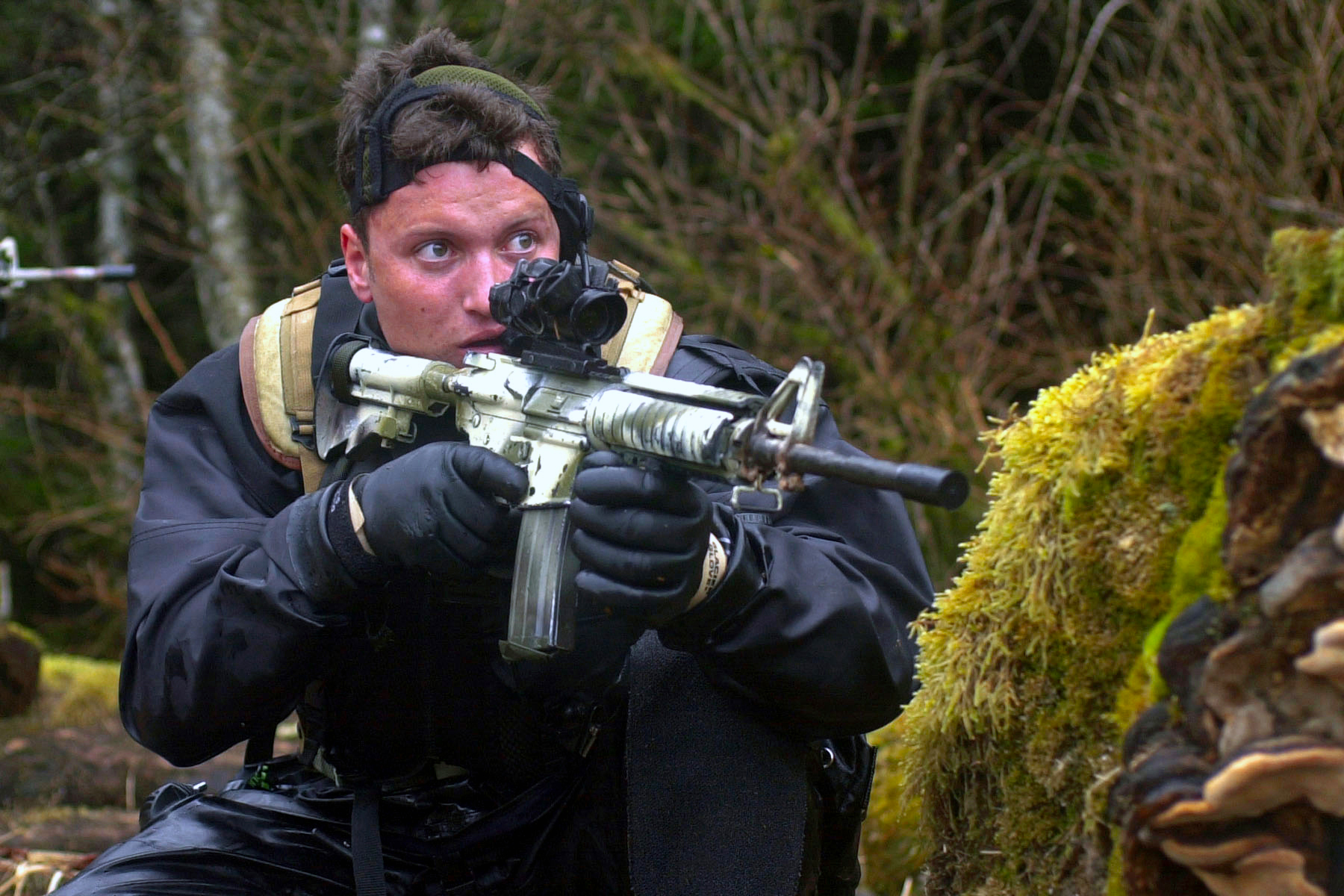
Matt Bissonnette in March 2001

Matt Bissonnette, a SEAL who participated in the raid, wrote an account of the mission in the book No Easy Day (2012), which significantly contradicts Pfarrer's account. Bissonnette wrote that the helicopter approach and landing matched the official version. According to Bissonnette, when bin Laden peered out at the Americans advancing on his third-floor room, the SEAL who fired upon him hit him on the right side of the head. Bin Laden stumbled into his bedroom, where the SEALs found him crumpled and twitching on the floor in a pool of blood and brain matter, with two women crying over his body. The other SEALs allegedly grabbed the women, moved them away, and shot several rounds into bin Laden's chest until he was motionless. According to Bissonnette, the weapons in the room—an AK-47 rifle and a Makarov pistol—were unloaded.

Unlike the official account, Bissonnette's version alleges that bin Laden's wife Mariam was uninjured in the raid. In addition, Bissonnette states that the report of bin Laden's daughter Safia having splintered wood striking her foot is false, as he explains that it was rather his wife Amal who was injured by such fragments.

The author also asserted that one SEAL sat on bin Laden's chest in a cramped helicopter as his body was flown back to Afghanistan.

Bissonnette stated that a search of bin Laden's room after his death uncovered a bottle of Just for Men hair dye.

==== Esquire interview ====
In February 2013, Esquire conducted an interview with an anonymous individual called "the shooter" who said that bin Laden placed one of his wives between himself and the commandos, pushing her towards them. "Shooter" then claimed bin Laden stood up and had a gun "within reach" and it was only then that he fired two shots into bin Laden's forehead, killing him. Another member of SEAL Team Six said the story as presented in Esquire was false and "complete BS". Then, in November 2014, former SEAL Robert O'Neill disclosed his identity as the shooter in a series of interviews with The Washington Post.

==== Hillhouse and Hersh reports ====
In 2011 American intelligence analyst Raelynn Hillhouse wrote that according to U.S. intelligence sources, the U.S. had been tipped-off to bin Laden's location by an unnamed Pakistani intelligence insider collecting the $25 million reward. According to the sources, Pakistan purposely stood-down its armed forces to allow the U.S. raid, and the original plan was to kill—not capture—bin Laden. Hillhouse's sources stated that the Pakistanis had been keeping bin Laden under house arrest near their military headquarters in Abbottabad with money provided by the Saudis. According to The Daily Telegraph, Hillhouse's account might explain why U.S. forces encountered no resistance on their way to and in Abbottabad, and why some residents in Abbottabad were warned to stay in their houses the day before the raid. Hillhouse later also said bin Laden's body had been thrown out of a helicopter over the Hindu Kush. Hillhouse's account was picked up and published internationally.

In May 2015, a detailed article in the London Review of Books by journalist Seymour Hersh said that the Pakistani Inter-Services Intelligence (ISI) had kept bin Laden under house arrest at Abbottabad since 2006, and that Pakistani Army chief Pervez Kayani and ISI director Ahmad Shuja Pasha aided the U.S. mission to kill, not capture bin Laden. According to Hersh, Pakistani officials were always aware of bin Laden's location and were guarding the compound with their own soldiers. Pakistan decided to give up bin Laden's location to the U.S. because American aid was declining. Pakistani officials were aware of the raid, and assisted the U.S. in carrying it out. According to Hersh, bin Laden was basically an invalid.

Hersh's U.S. and Pakistani intelligence sources stated that the U.S. had learned of bin Laden's location through a Pakistani walk-in seeking the $25 million reward, and not through tracking a courier. NBC News and Agence France-Presse subsequently reported that their sources indicated a walk-in was an extremely valuable asset, though the sources disputed that the walk-in knew the location of bin Laden. Pakistan-based journalist Amir Mir in the News International reported the walk-in's identity to be Usman Khalid, though that allegation was denied by Khalid's family.

Although similar in claims, both Hillhouse's and Hersh's accounts of the bin Laden death appeared to be based on different sources which The Intercept concluded might corroborate the claims if their identities were known. After the Hersh story broke, NBC News also independently reported that a Pakistani intelligence officer was the source of the original bin Laden location report, and not the courier.

The White House denied Hersh's report. A former intelligence official who had direct knowledge of the operation speculated that the Pakistanis, who were furious that the operation took place without being detected by them, were behind the conflicting story as a way to save face. Pakistani journalist Ahmed Rashid in The New York Review of Books finds the cooperation between the CIA and ISI that Hersh describes "inconceivable," in part because 2011 was "the worst year in U.S.-Pakistan relations since the late 1980s" and "hatred and mistrust" between the CIA and ISI was "acute"—something Hersh does not mention. Among the incidents that occurred in Pakistan in the months before the killing of bin Laden were the killing of two Pakistanis by CIA contractor Raymond Davis, numerous death threats against the Islamabad CIA station chief after his name was leaked (purportedly by the ISI), the cessation of the issuing of visas for U.S. officials (following which the U.S. consulate in Lahore was moved to Islamabad over concerns about security), increased U.S. anger over the refusal of Pakistan to exert pressure on the Taliban, the death of 40 Pakistanis including many civilians and later 24 Pakistani soldiers from U.S. drone strikes; and the cut-off of U.S. supplies to Afghanistan by Pakistan. Peter Bergen countered Hersh's claim that the shots fired at bin Laden were the only ones fired that evening would ignore that bin Laden's bodyguards were also shot and that the building had a multitude of bullet holes. He stated the U.S. government had intercepted the communications of Generals Kayani and Pasha, and their response had shown that neither had any knowledge of bin Laden's whereabouts. Nelly Lahoud, who analyzed the documents seized during the operation to kill bin Laden, disagrees with Hersh's assertion that bin Laden was an ISI hostage. She stated that even a casual reading of the documents would make it abundantly clear that bin Laden went to great lengths to hide from Pakistani authorities, and it would be inconceivable that bin Laden himself did not know he was being held hostage.

=== Indian airspace controversy ===
In the publication No Easy Day, a map of the operation show the U.S. SEALs briefly crossed into Indian territory before its loop approaching Abbottabad in Pakistan, raising questions in India whether the U.S. violated Indian airspace, and if India had advance knowledge about the mission. The Indian Air Force dismissed claims that the U.S. crossed into Indian airspace.

=== Conspiracy theories ===
The reports of bin Laden's death on May 2, 2011, are not universally accepted despite unreleased DNA testing confirming his identity, bin Laden's twelve-year-old daughter witnessing his death, and a May 6, 2011, al-Qaeda statement confirming his death. The swift burial of bin Laden's body at sea, the speed of the DNA results, and the decision not to release pictures of the dead body have led to the rise of conspiracy theories that bin Laden had not died in the raid. Some blogs suggested that the U.S. government feigned the raid, and some forums hosted debates over the alleged hoax.

== Role of Pakistan ==
Pakistan came under intense international scrutiny after the raid. The Pakistani government denied that it had sheltered bin Laden, and said it had shared information with the CIA and other intelligence agencies about the compound since 2009.

Carlotta Gall, in her 2014 book The Wrong Enemy: America in Afghanistan, 2001–2014, accuses the ISI, Pakistan's clandestine intelligence service, of hiding and protecting Osama bin Laden and his family after the September 11, 2001, attacks. She claims that the United States had direct evidence that Inter-Services Intelligence (ISI) chief, Lt. Gen. Ahmad Shuja Pasha, knew of bin Laden's presence in Abbottabad, but ISI, Pasha and officials in Washington all deny this: "C.I.A. and other Obama administration officials have said they possess no evidence—no intercepts, no unreleased documents from Abbottabad—that Kayani or Pasha or any other I.S.I. officer knew where bin Laden was hiding."

After the raid, there was an unconfirmed report that Pakistan allowed Chinese military officials to examine the wreckage of the crashed helicopter.

=== Connections with Abbottabad ===
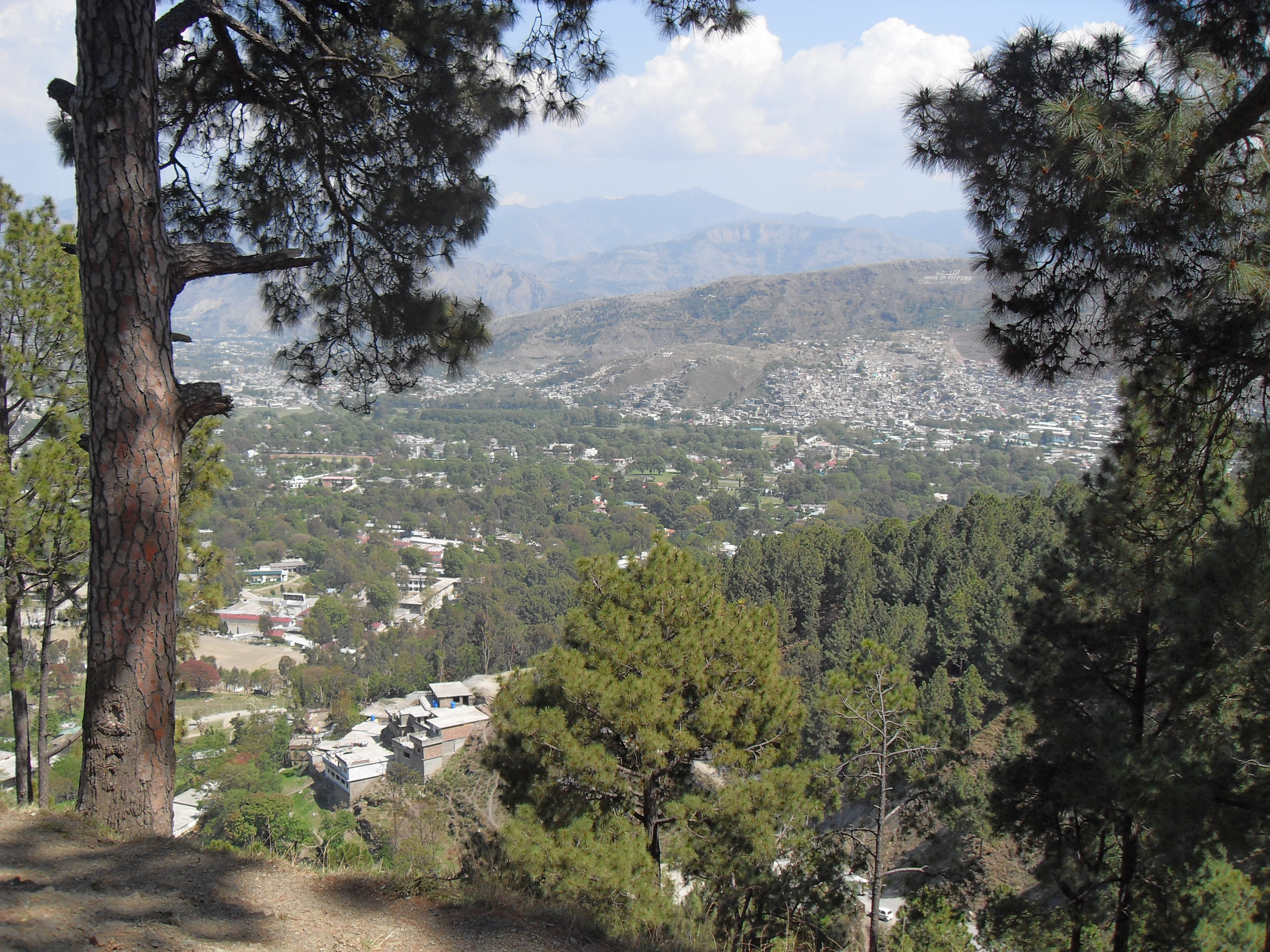
View of Abbottabad, Pakistan (2011)

Abbottabad attracted refugees from fighting in the tribal areas and Swat Valley, as well as Afghanistan. "People don't really care now to ask who's there," said Gohar Ayub Khan, a former foreign minister and resident of the city. "That's one of the reasons why, possibly, he came in there."

The city was home to at least one al-Qaeda leader before bin Laden. Operational chief Abu Faraj al-Libi reportedly moved his family to Abbottabad in mid-2003. Pakistan Inter-Services Intelligence (ISI) raided the house in December 2003 but did not find him. This account was contradicted by American officials who said that satellite photos show that in 2004 the site was an empty field. A courier told interrogators that al-Libi used three houses in Abbottabad. Pakistani officials say they informed their American counterparts at the time that the city could be a hiding place for al-Qaeda leaders. In 2009 officials began providing the U.S. with intelligence about bin Laden's compound without knowing who lived there.

On January 25, 2011, ISI arrested Umar Patek, an Indonesian wanted in connection with the 2002 Bali bombings, while he was staying with a family in Abbottabad. Tahir Shehzad, a clerk at the post office, was arrested on suspicion of facilitating travel for al-Qaeda militants.

=== Allegations against Pakistan ===
Numerous allegations were made that the government of Pakistan had shielded bin Laden. Critics cited the proximity of bin Laden's heavily fortified compound to the Pakistan Military Academy, that the U.S. chose to not notify Pakistani authorities before the operation, and the double standards of Pakistan regarding the perpetrators of the 2008 Mumbai attacks. Leaked diplomatic cables disclosed that American diplomats had been told that Pakistani security services were tipping off bin Laden every time U.S. forces approached. Pakistan's Inter-Services Intelligence (ISI), also helped smuggle al-Qaeda militants into Afghanistan to fight NATO troops. According to the leaked files, in December 2009, the government of Tajikistan had also told U.S. officials that many in Pakistan were aware of bin Laden's whereabouts.

CIA chief Leon Panetta said the CIA had ruled out involving Pakistan in the operation, because it feared that "any effort to work with the Pakistanis could jeopardize the mission. They might alert the targets." Secretary of State Hillary Clinton said that "cooperation with Pakistan helped lead us to bin Laden and the compound in which he was hiding." Obama echoed her sentiments. John O. Brennan, Obama's chief counterterrorism advisor, said that it was inconceivable that bin Laden did not have support from within Pakistan. He said: "People have been referring to this as hiding in plain sight. We are looking at how he was able to hide out there for so long."

The Indian Minister for Home Affairs, P. Chidambaram, said that bin Laden hiding "deep inside" Pakistan was a matter of grave concern for India, and showed that "many of the perpetrators of the Mumbai terror attacks, including the controllers and the handlers of the terrorists who actually carried out the attack, continue to be sheltered in Pakistan." He called on Pakistan to arrest them.

Pakistani-born British member of parliament Khalid Mahmood said he was "flabbergasted and shocked" after he learned that bin Laden was living in a city with thousands of Pakistani troops, reviving questions about alleged links between al-Qaeda and elements in Pakistan's security forces.

On August 7, 2011, Raelynn Hillhouse, an American spy novelist and security analyst, posted "The Spy Who Billed Me" on her national security blog, suggesting that Pakistan's ISI had sheltered bin Laden in return for a $25 million bounty; ISI and government officials have denied her allegations.

Former Pakistani Army Chief, General Ziauddin Butt has said that, according to his knowledge, Osama bin Laden was kept in an Intelligence Bureau safe house in Abbottabad by the then Director-General of the Intelligence Bureau of Pakistan (2004–2008), Brigadier Ijaz Shah. This had occurred with the "full knowledge" of former army chief General Pervez Musharraf and possibly that of current Chief of Army Staff (COAS) General Ashfaq Parvez Kayani. However the reporter who interviewed him, Riedel, noted that Butt had "a motive to speak harshly about Musharraf". Ziauddin Butt would later deny making these claims about Musharraf and Shah. Emails from the private American security firm, Stratfor, published by WikiLeaks on February 27, 2012, indicate that up to 12 officials in Pakistan's ISI knew of Osama bin Laden's Abbottabad safe house. Stratfor had been given access to the papers collected by American forces from bin Laden's Abbottabad house. The emails reveal that these Pakistani officers included "Mid to senior level ISI and Pak Mil with one retired Pak Mil General." In 2014, British journalist Carlotta Gall revealed that she had been told by an undisclosed ISI source that the ISI "ran a special desk assigned to handle bin Laden." The desk was "led by an officer who made his own decisions and did not report to a superior [...] but the top military bosses knew about it, I was told."

According to Steve Coll, as of 2019 there is no direct evidence showing Pakistani knowledge of bin Laden's presence in Abbottabad, even by a rogue or compartmented faction within the government, other than the circumstantial fact of bin Laden's compound being located near (albeit not directly visible from) the Pakistan Military Academy. Documents captured from the Abbottabad compound generally show that bin Laden was wary of contact with Pakistani intelligence and police, especially in light of Pakistan's role in the arrest of Khalid Sheikh Mohammed; it has also been suggested that the $25 million U.S. reward for information leading to bin Laden would have been enticing to Pakistani officers given their reputation for corruption. The compound itself, although unusually tall, was less conspicuous than sometimes envisaged by Americans, given the common local habit of walling off homes for protection against violence or to ensure the privacy of female family members. Coll notes that a Pakistani Taliban cell had previously surveilled the army's General Headquarters in Rawalpindi out of a nearby house for two months prior to a deadly October 2009 attack on the facility—without detection.

=== Pakistani response ===
External videos
- Pakistan After bin Laden - Vice.

According to a Pakistani intelligence official, raw phone-tap data had been transferred to the U.S. without being analyzed by Pakistan. While the U.S. "was concentrating on this" information since September 2010, information regarding bin Laden and the compound's inhabitants had "slipped from" Pakistan's "radar" over the months. Bin Laden left "an invisible footprint" and he had not been contacting other militant networks. It was noted that much focus had been placed on a courier entering and leaving the compound. The transfer of intelligence to the U.S. was a regular occurrence according to the official, who also stated regarding the raid that "I think they came in undetected and went out the same day," and Pakistan did not believe that U.S. personnel were present in the area before the special operation occurred.

According to the Pakistani high commissioner to the United Kingdom, Wajid Shamsul Hasan, Pakistan had prior knowledge that an operation would happen. Pakistan was "in the know of certain things" and "what happened, happened with our consent. Americans got to know him—where he was first—and that's why they struck it and struck it precisely." Husain Haqqani, Pakistani ambassador to the U.S., had said that Pakistan would have pursued bin Laden had the intelligence of his location existed with them and Pakistan was "very glad that our American partners did. They had superior intelligence, superior technology, and we are grateful to them."

Another Pakistani official stated that Pakistan "assisted only in terms of authorization of the helicopter flights in our airspace" and the operation was conducted by the United States. He also said that "in any event, we did not want anything to do with such an operation in case something went wrong."

In June, the ISI arrested the owner of a safe house rented to the CIA to observe Osama bin Laden's compound and five CIA informants.

Mark Kelton, then the CIA station chief for Pakistan, alleges that he was poisoned by the ISI in retaliation for the raid, forcing him to leave the country.

== Code name ==
Several officials who were present in the Situation Room, including the president, told reporters that the code name for bin Laden was "Geronimo". They had watched Leon Panetta, speaking from CIA headquarters, while he narrated the action in Abbottabad. Panetta said, "We have a visual on Geronimo," and later, "Geronimo EKIA"—enemy killed in action. The words of the commander on the ground were, "For God and country, Geronimo, Geronimo, Geronimo." Officials subsequently explained that each step of the mission was labelled alphabetically in an "Execution Checklist," which is used to ensure all participants in a large operation are kept synchronized with a minimum of radio traffic. "Geronimo" indicated the raiders had reached step "G," the capture or killing of bin Laden. Osama bin Laden was identified as "Jackpot," the general code name for the target of an operation. ABC News reported that otherwise his regular code name was "Cakebread." The New Yorker reported that bin Laden's code name was "Crankshaft."

Many Native Americans were offended that Geronimo, the renowned 19th-century Apache leader, was irrevocably linked with bin Laden. The chairman of the Fort Sill Apache Tribe, the successor to Geronimo's tribe, wrote a letter to Obama asking him to "right this wrong." The president of the Navajo Nation requested that the U.S. government change the code name retroactively. Officials from the National Congress of American Indians said the focus should be on honoring the disproportionately high number of Native Americans who serve in the military, and they had been assured that "Geronimo" was not a code name for bin Laden. The U.S. Senate Committee on Indian Affairs heard testimony on the issue from tribal leaders, while the Defense Department had no comment except to say that no disrespect was intended.

== Derivation of intelligence ==
After the death of bin Laden, some officials from the Bush administration, such as former Bush Office of Legal Counsel attorney John Yoo and former attorney general Michael Mukasey, wrote op-eds stating that the enhanced interrogation techniques they authorized (since legally clarified as torture) yielded the intelligence that later led to locating bin Laden's hideout. Mukasey said that the waterboarding of Khalid Sheikh Mohammed caused him to reveal the nickname of bin Laden's courier.

U.S. officials and legislators, including Republican John McCain and Democrat Dianne Feinstein, chairwoman of the U.S. Senate Select Committee on Intelligence, countered that those statements were false. They noted that a report by CIA director Leon Panetta stated that the first mention of the courier's nickname did not come from Mohammed, but rather from another government's interrogation of a suspect who they said they "believe was not tortured".

McCain called on Mukasey to retract his statements:

I have sought further information from the staff of the Senate Intelligence Committee, and they confirm for me that, in fact, the best intelligence gained from a CIA detainee—information describing Abu Ahmed al-Kuwaiti's real role in Al-Qaeda and his true relationship to Osama bin Laden—was obtained through standard, non-coercive means, not through any 'enhanced interrogation technique.'

— John McCain

Panetta had written a letter to McCain on the issue, saying: "Some of the detainees who provided useful information about the facilitator/courier's role had been subjected to enhanced interrogation techniques. Whether those techniques were the 'only timely and effective way' to obtain such information is a matter of debate and cannot be established definitively." Although some information may have been obtained from detainees who were subjected to torture, Panetta wrote to McCain that:

We first learned about the facilitator/courier's nom de guerre from a detainee not in CIA custody in 2002. It is also important to note that some detainees who were subjected to enhanced interrogation techniques attempted to provide false or misleading information about the facilitator/courier. These attempts to falsify the facilitator/courier's role were alerting. In the end, no detainee in CIA custody revealed the facilitator/courier's full true name or specific whereabouts. This information was discovered through other intelligence means.

In addition, other U.S. officials state that shortly after the September 11, 2001, terrorist attacks, detainees in CIA secret prisons told interrogators about the courier's pseudonym "al-Kuwaiti" and that when Khalid Sheikh Mohammed was later captured, he only confirmed the courier's pseudonym. After Abu Faraj al-Libbi was captured, he provided false or misleading information: he denied that he knew al-Kuwaiti and he made up another name instead. Also, a group of interrogators asserted that the courier's nickname was not divulged "during torture, but rather several months later, when [detainees] were questioned by interrogators who did not use abusive techniques."

== Intelligence postmortem ==
Evidence seized from the compound is said to include ten cell phones, five to ten computers, twelve hard drives, at least 100 computer disks (including thumb drives and DVDs), handwritten notes, documents, weapons, and an assortment of personal items. It was described by a senior Pentagon intelligence official as "the single largest collection of senior terrorist materials ever." On November 1, 2017, the CIA released to the public approximately 470,000 files and a copy of bin Laden's diary.

Intelligence analysts also studied call detail records from two phone numbers that were found to be sewn into bin Laden's clothing. They helped over the course of several months to apprehend several al-Qaeda members in several countries and to kill several of bin Laden's closest associates by CIA drone attacks in Pakistan.

The material gathered at the compound was stored at the FBI Laboratory in Quantico, Virginia, where forensic experts analyzed fingerprints, DNA, and other trace evidence left on the material. Copies of the material were provided to other agencies; officials want to preserve a chain of custody in case any of the information is needed as evidence in a future trial.

A special CIA team was given the responsibility of combing through the digital material and documents removed from the bin Laden compound. The CIA team is working in collaboration with other U.S. government agencies "to triage, catalog and analyze this intelligence."

Amal Ahmed al-Sadahk, Bin Laden's youngest wife, told Pakistani investigators that the family lived in the feudal village of Chak Shah Muhammad, in the nearby district of Haripur, Pakistan, for two and a half years before moving to Abbottabad in late 2005.

The material seized from the compound contained al-Qaeda's strategy for Afghanistan after America's withdrawal from the country in 2014, as well as thousands of electronic memos and missives that captured conversations between bin Laden and his deputies around the world. It showed that bin Laden stayed in touch with al-Qaeda's established affiliates and sought new alliances with groups such as Boko Haram from Nigeria. According to the material, he sought to reassert control over factions of loosely affiliated jihadists from Yemen to Somalia, as well as independent actors whom he believed had sullied al-Qaeda's reputation and muddied its central message. Bin Laden was worried at times about his personal security and was annoyed that his organization had not utilized the Arab Spring to improve its image. He acted, according to The Washington Post, on the one hand as "chief executive fully engaged in the group's myriad crises, grappling with financial problems, recruitment, rebellious field managers, and sudden staff vacancies resulting from the unrelenting U.S. drone campaign," and on the other hand as "a hands-on manager who participated in the terrorist group's operational planning and strategic thinking while also giving orders and advice to field operatives scattered worldwide." The material also described Osama bin Laden's relation with Ayman al-Zawahiri and Atiyah Abd al-Rahman.

Seventeen documents seized during the Abbottabad raid, consisting of electronic letters or draft letters dating from September 2006 to April 2011, were released by the Combating Terrorism Center at West Point one year and one day after bin Laden's death and made available at The Washington Post homepage. The documents covered subjects such as the news media in America, affiliate organizations, targets, security, and the Arab Spring. In the documents, bin Laden said al-Qaeda's strength was limited and therefore suggested that the best way to attack the U.S., which he compared to a tree, "is to concentrate on sawing the trunk." He refused the promotion of Anwar al-Awlaki when this was requested by Nasir al-Wuhayshi, leader of al-Qaeda in the Arabian Peninsula. "We here become reassured of the people when they go to the line and get examined there," bin Laden said. He told al-Qaeda in the Arabian Peninsula to expand operations in the U.S. in the wake of the 2009 Christmas Day bomb plot by writing "We need to extend and develop our operations in America and not keep it limited to blowing up airplanes."

The seized material shed light on al-Qaeda's relationship with Iran, which detained jihadis and their relatives in the wake of the U.S. invasion of Afghanistan, including members of bin Laden's family. Al-Qaeda's relationship with Iran was, according to the Combating Terrorism Center, an "unpleasant byproduct of necessity, fueled by mutual distrust and antagonism." An explicit reference to any institutional support from Pakistan for al-Qaeda wasn't mentioned in the documents; instead, bin Laden instructed his family members how to avoid detection so that members of Pakistani intelligence could not track them to find him. The seized material suggested that former commander of the international forces in Afghanistan David Petraeus and U.S. president Barack Obama should be assassinated during any of their visits to Pakistan and Afghanistan, if there was an opportunity to do so. Bin Laden opined that U.S. vice president Joe Biden should not be a target because "Biden is totally unprepared for that post [of president], which will lead the US into a crisis." Bin Laden was also against one-person suicide attacks and was of the opinion that at least two persons should undertake these attacks instead. He planned to reform in a way so that al-Qaeda's central leadership would have a greater say in the naming of the al-Qaeda branch leaders and their deputies. He expressed his opinion that killing Muslims has weakened his organization and not helped al-Qaeda, writing that it "cost the mujahedeen no small amount of sympathy among Muslims. The enemy has exploited the mistakes of the mujahedeen to mar their image among the masses."

The United States Department of Justice released a further eleven documents in March 2015. The documents were part of the trial against Abid Naseer, who was convicted of plotting to bomb a Manchester shopping mall in 2009. They included letters to and from Osama bin Laden in the year before his death, and showed the extent of the damage the CIA drone program had done to Al-Qaeda.

In addition to information and data recovered that were of intelligence interest, the documents and computer items also contained personal files, including family correspondence and a large stash of pornography. US officials have refused to characterize the type of pornography found other than to say that it was "modern" in nature. The most likely explanation for the pornography on bin Laden's hard drive is that he bought a poorly refurbished computer, since bin Laden did not have internet access and the computer was also infected with viruses.

== Helicopter stealth technology revelations ==
The tail section of the secret helicopter survived demolition and lay just outside the compound wall. Pakistani security forces put up a cloth barrier at first light to hide the wreckage. Later, a tractor hauled it away hidden under a tarp. Journalists obtained photographs that revealed the previously undisclosed stealth technology. Aviation Week said the helicopter appeared to be a significantly modified MH-60 Black Hawk. Serial numbers found at the scene were consistent with an MH-60 built in 2009. Its performance during the operation confirmed that a stealth helicopter could evade detection in a militarily sensitive, densely populated area. Photos showed that the Black Hawk's tail had stealth-configured shapes on the boom and the fairings, swept stabilizers and a "hubcap" over the noise-reducing five- or six-blade tail rotor. It appeared to have a silver-loaded infrared suppression finish similar to some V-22 Ospreys. The crash of the Black Hawk may have been, at least in part, caused by the aerodynamic deficiencies introduced to the airframe by the stealth technology add-ons (an unrelated possible cause of the crash was that the rehearsal mock-ups of the compound had used a chain-link fence rather than a solid wall for the perimeter and thus had not reproduced the airflows that the helicopter would face).

The U.S. requested return of the wreckage and the Chinese government also expressed interest, according to Pakistani officials. Pakistan had custody of the wreckage for over two weeks before its return was secured by U.S. senator John Kerry. Experts disagreed as to how much information could have been gleaned from the tail fragment. Stealth technology was already operational; the modified Black Hawk was the first confirmed operational "stealth helicopter". It is likely that the most valuable information obtainable from the wreckage was the composition of the radar-absorbing paint used on the tail section. Local children were seen picking up pieces of the wreckage and selling them as souvenirs. In August 2011, Fox News reported that Pakistan had allowed Chinese scientists to examine the helicopter's tail section and was especially interested in its radar-absorbing paint. Pakistan and the PRC denied these claims.

== See also ==
- 2013 raid on Barawe
- Abbottabad Commission
- Coup de main
- Death of Abu Bakr al-Baghdadi
- FBI Ten Most Wanted Fugitives
- High-value target
- Killing of Ayman al-Zawahiri, 2022 U.S. drone strike on bin Laden's successor
- Killing of Yahya Sinwar
- Assassination of Ali Khamenei
- Operation Vengeance, WWII mission targeting Isoroku Yamamoto, the architect of the attack on Pearl Harbor
- Shakil Afridi, a doctor who was alleged to have assisted the U.S. in locating bin Laden
