= Akhtiar Mohammed =

Akhtiar Mohammed may refer to:

- Akhtar Mohammed (Guantanamo detainee 845), participated in his Combatant Status Review Tribunal and his Administrative Review Board hearing
- Akhtiar Mohammad (Guantanamo captive 1036), participated in his Combatant Status Review Tribunal and his Administrative Review Board hearing
- Aktar Muhammad, Oruzgan police officer; see Oruzgan police station attack of January 2002
