= Oruzgan police station attack of January 2002 =

Attack by American special forces

American special forces mounted an attack on an Oruzgan police station in January 2002. On January 23, 2002, American special forces attacked a District police station, and a nearby school that was the temporary home to a delegation of the official Afghan government disarmament commission. Numerous casualties were inflicted during the attack. The Pentagon acknowledged killing 15 Afghan officials. Afghan sources said 21 civilians were killed. Two senior officials from the disarmament commission were among the dead.

The Pentagon eventually acknowledged the attacks were mistakes—blaming faulty intelligence. The Pentagon acknowledged that the men were neither Taliban or al Qaeda, and blamed the attack on bad intelligence. 27 Afghan officials were held by the Americans for over two weeks, in conditions they described as brutal, in the Kandahar detention facility.

Abdul Rauf, the Chief of Police, said his men surrendered without a fight. He described being beaten into unconsciousness, after his surrender, only to find himself lying next to the dead body of one of his men when he awoke.

Carlotta Gall, of the New York Times, interviewed three other police officers, Allah Noor, Ziauddin, and Aktar Muhammad, who also described brutal beatings while in US custody. Ziauddin said he was beaten so hard it had knocked out one of his teeth.

Abdul Rauf told New York Times reporter Carlotta Gall that he would never forgive the Americans for their brutality.
