= The Wrong Enemy =

The Wrong Enemy: America in Afghanistan, 2001–2014
- Author: Carlotta Gall
- Publisher: Houghton Mifflin Harcourt
- Publication date: 2014
- Pages: 352
- ISBN: 978-0-544-04669-6

The Wrong Enemy: America in Afghanistan, 2001–2014 is a 2014 book by Carlotta Gall. In the book, she argues that the United States and its allies have been focused on stopping the terrorist activities of al-Qaeda and its Taliban supporters in Afghanistan, but that focus should instead have been on antagonistic forces in Pakistan. She claims that the Taliban exists and Osama bin Laden was able to survive for so long because Pakistan's government and the people at the Inter-Services Intelligence provided support to them.

Gall argues, using quotations from the area's leaders, that the US should have fought al-Qaeda and the Taliban inside Pakistan instead of going to war in Iraq in 2003.
