= Carlotta Gall =

British journalist and author

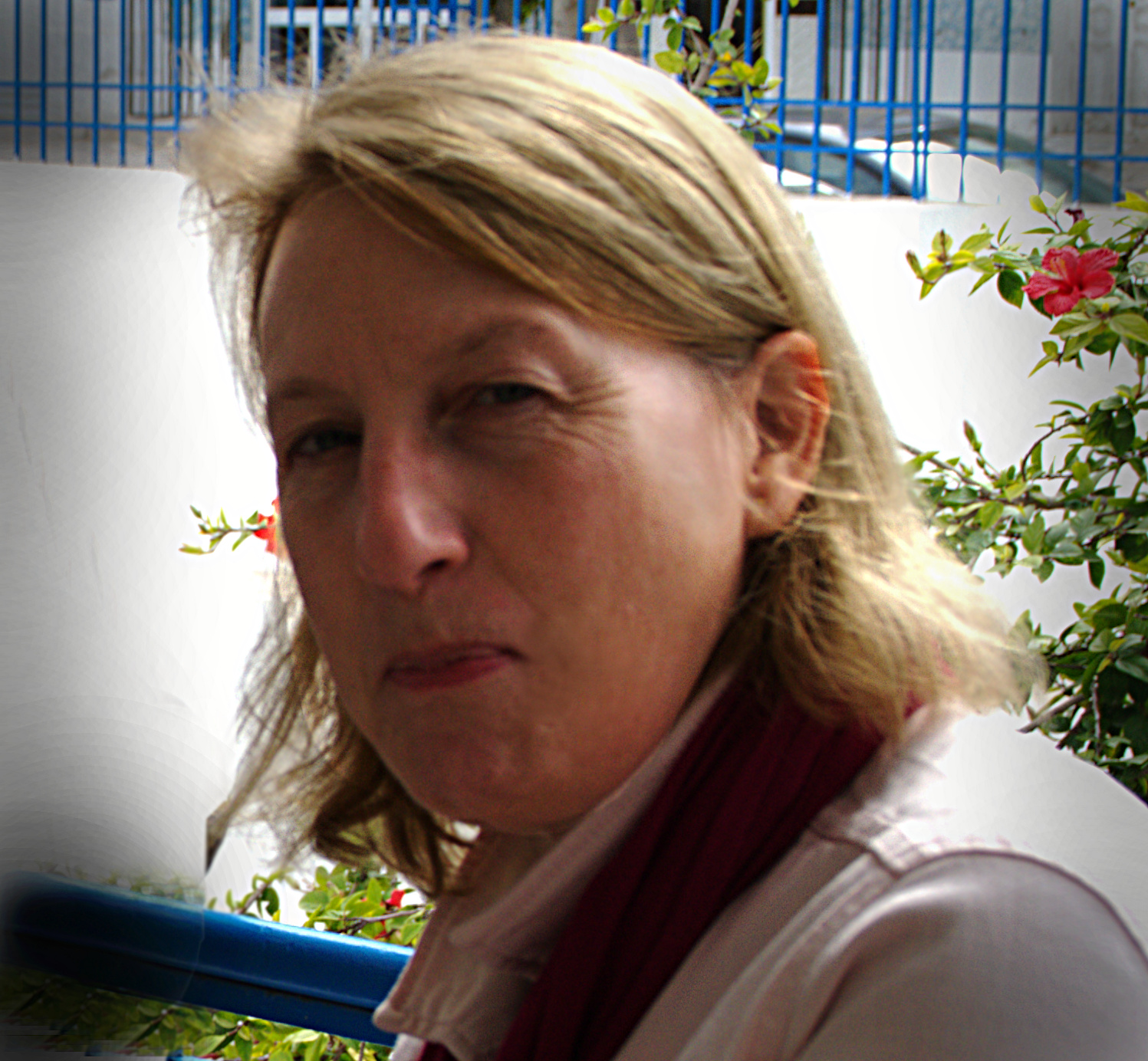
- Gall in Sayada
- Born: Carlotta Gall; England, United Kingdom
- Occupations: journalist, author
- Notable credit(s): The New York Times, Chechnya: Calamity in the Caucasus (book)

Carlotta Gall is a British journalist and author who covered Afghanistan and Pakistan for The New York Times for twelve years. She was also their Istanbul bureau chief covering Turkey and now covers the war in Ukraine.

== Career ==
Daughter of veteran Scottish journalist Sandy Gall, Carlotta Gall started her newspaper career with The Moscow Times, in Moscow, in 1994, and covered the first war in Chechnya intensively for the paper, among other stories all over the former Soviet Union. She also freelanced for British papers (The Independent, The Times, and The Sunday Times) as well as American publications (USA Today, Newsweek and The New York Times).

In 1996, she co-authored with Thomas de Waal, Chechnya: A Small Victorious War. The following year, they published Chechnya: Calamity in the Caucasus, which was awarded the James Cameron Prize for Distinguished Reporting in the UK. Gall was awarded the Kurt Schork award for international freelance journalism in 2002, the Interaction award for international reporting in 2005, and was awarded the Edward Weintal Prize for diplomatic reporting by Georgetown University's Institute for the Study of Diplomacy in 2007.

In 1998, she moved to the Financial Times and The Economist reporting on the Caucasus and Central Asia from Baku, Azerbaijan. From 1999 to 2001, Gall worked in the Balkans for the New York Times, covering the wars in Kosovo, Serbia and Macedonia and developments in Bosnia and the rest of the former Yugoslavia. From 2001 to 2013, she was based in Afghanistan, as a correspondent with The New York Times for Pakistan and Afghanistan. From 2013 to 2017, she was the newspaper's North Africa correspondent based in Tunis and then the Times' bureau chief in Istanbul, Turkey; she now covers the war in Ukraine.

== Publication and documentary ==
Gall is featured in the Academy Award-winning documentary Taxi to the Dark Side (2007). She was the first journalist to report the story of two Afghans who died in US custody at Bagram air base (Parwan Detention Facility). The case of an Afghan taxi driver beaten to death in 2002 while in US-military custody forms the heart of the documentary's examination of the abuses committed during the detainment and interrogation of political prisoners. Gall investigated the death of cab driver Dilawar, officially declared by the military to be from natural causes but uncovered what she considers to be incontrovertible evidence to the contrary.

In 2014, in her book The Wrong Enemy: America in Afghanistan, 2001-2014, she accused the ISI, Pakistan's clandestine intelligence service, of hiding and protecting Osama bin Laden and his family after the September 11, 2001, attacks.

== Bibliography ==
- —; de Waal, Thomas (1997). Chechnya: a small victorious war. London: Pan Macmillan Adult. ISBN 978-0-330-35075-4.
- —; de Waal, Thomas (1998). Chechnya: Calamity in the Caucasus. New York: New York University Press. ISBN 978-0-8147-2963-2.
- — (2014). The Wrong Enemy: America in Afghanistan, 2001-2014. Boston: Mariner Books. ISBN 978-0-544-53856-6.
