= Unfair Dealing =

- Produced by: David Weingarten
- Release date: 2008
- Country: Canada

Unfair Dealing is an independent 2008 documentary film produced by Canadian broadcaster David Weingarten. The film was originally marketed to an online audience.

The film alleges that the terrorism charges brought against the "Toronto 18" were largely exaggerated or fabricated by the Royal Canadian Mounted Police (RCMP) and Canadian Security Intelligence Service (CSIS) in order to justify the controversial Canadian Anti-Terrorism Act, and increased funding for security and law enforcement.

== Areas of controversy ==
=== Suspicious timing/circumstances surrounding the arrests ===
The film refers to an article in Maclean's magazine, in which Muslim politician Wajid Khan tacitly admits that surveillance on at least one suspect was the result of him speaking out against Canada's role in the War in Afghanistan. The film also scrutinizes the politically sensitive timing of the arrests, since they were carried out shortly before a Parliamentary Review of Canada's Anti-terrorism Act. Another issue raised in the film is the history of scandals surrounding the RCMP and previous dirty trick tactics, as well as their previous unsuccessful attempts to arrest large groups of Canadians under the guise of combating terrorism. The film examines the sensational media-coverage of the "Toronto 18", and strongly criticizes the roles and motivations of two informants involved in the case.

=== The informants ===
One police informant who assisted in the arrests is Mubin Shaikh. Shaikh was reportedly in charge of accompanying some of the accused on a camping trip, where they played paint-ball in a forest north of Toronto. Shaikh has contradicted his claims that this camping trip was a terrorist training camp.

The other informant is in witness protection. In 2006, he was identified as an Egyptian in his 20s, with a degree in agricultural engineering. According to the CBC, "the young mole's degree in agricultural engineering could have given the alleged conspirators access to much larger quantities of ammonium nitrate than they could have purchased at ordinary retail outlets." Some critics say this fact could foreshadow the use of entrapment as a defense, since the informants actions facilitated the purchase of bomb-making materials that the suspects would have been otherwise unable to acquire.

However, the courts found that both agents did not entrap the suspects.

=== Other controversies ===
Unfair Dealing raises the issue of abuse in the prisons where the remaining "Toronto 18" suspects are being held. The film points to the fact that some suspects have been in solitary confinement for almost two years, which is considered by some to be a form of cruel and unusual punishment. Another issue raised in the film is treatment of the prisoners, specifically Steven Vikash Chand, who the CBC reports was allegedly hit on the face, "then dragged... naked along a hallway by his hair and (thrown) into a bare cell smeared with feces and smelling of urine." Unfair Dealing also casts suspicion on the proximity of an RCMP detachment to a warehouse where the suspects allegedly had bomb-making materials delivered, which is within 800 meters of the Toronto North RCMP Detachment in Newmarket, Ontario.

== Accuracy ==
Since the release of Unfair Dealing, several claims in the film have been proven true through court proceedings. The informant Mubin Shaikh has admitted that the attendees of an alleged terrorist training camp North of Toronto were actually unaware of any terrorist plans to attack Canada, as is alleged in the documentary. It has also been revealed through court proceedings that Shaikh purchased a rifle and ammunition for some of the accused at the behest of Zakaria Amara, and instructed some of them on how to use a handgun that was present during a winter camping trip at the instruction of Faheem Ahmad.

The film's portrayal of informant Shaher Elsohemy as a financially motivated informant, whose participation was integral to the success of the bomb-plot, has also proven accurate. Notes from the Canadian Security Intelligence Service have confirmed that Elsohemy was motivated out of “money” and “spite”, citing an attempt by Elsohemy to defraud a previous employer for disability benefits. Court has also heard that Elsohemy was hired for the explicit purposes of enticing the suspects with his credentials in agricultural engineering, facilitating the purchase of bomb-ingredients, and providing a warehouse for the storage of bomb-making materials, confirming previous reports focused on in the documentary.

== Production team ==
David Weingarten is a Toronto-area broadcaster who has worked with CIUT-FM and CBC Radio One. Adil Lakhani is the co-producer of Unfair Dealing. He is a radio-personality with CIUT-FM, and is originally from Mississauga.
