= Ahmad Ghany =

- Born: September 27, 1984; Mississauga, Ontario
- Occupations: McMaster University, health sciences student
- Spouse: Ran Farq
- Parent: Farooq Abdullah Ghany

Ahmad Mustafa Ghany (born September 27, 1984) is a 2004 graduate of McMaster University's health sciences program, and was one of 17 people initially arrested in the 2006 Toronto terrorism arrests.

Two years later, he was among the suspects in the alleged terrorism case who were released and had all charges dropped.

== Life ==
Ghany is the son of urologist Ghany, who moved to Canada from Trinidad and Tobago in 1955.

== Arrest ==
On June 2, 2006, the 21-year-old Ghany was driving his Lexus car along the Gardiner Expressway in Toronto, when police vehicles surrounded him and forced the car to the side of the road, where they arrested, handcuffed and searched Ghany.

Friends and family expressed disbelief at Ghany's arrest, stating that he was "the most quiet guy ever", and "kind of a nerd". People were shocked to hear this news and didn't believe what happened.

== Charges, bail and release ==
Represented by Rocco Galati, Ghany was held at the Maplehurst Correctional Complex. He was charged under the Canadian Anti-Terrorism Act with participating in a terrorist group, and training for terrorist purposes. The charges stemmed from his attendance at a winter camp near Washago that prosecutors alleged was planned as an opportunity to hone their terrorist skills. Ghany was only at the camp for three days, helping to set up the site, playing paintball and leaving early.

Six weeks after the arrests, Ghany became the second suspect to be granted bail as he was released by Justice Hilda Weiss on a $140,000 pledge on July 20 on the condition that he could not leave his parents' house unaccompanied unless going to school, work or to see his lawyer, that he report to police weekly, and not communicate with other suspects in the case.

On April 15, 2008, nearly two years after the arrests, all charges were dropped against Ghany, Qayyum Abdul Jamal, Ibrahim Aboud and Yasim Mohamed.
