= Syed Haris Ahmed =

Naturalized American citizen (born 1984)

- Born: December 9, 1984; Peshawar, Khyber Pakhtunkhwa, Pakistan
- Parent: Syed Riaz Ahmed
- Conviction: Convicted
- Criminal charges: 2006 Toronto terrorism arrests Providing material support for terrorism
- Penalty: 13 years in prison, to be followed by 30 years of supervised release

Syed Haris Ahmed (born 1984) is a naturalized American citizen born in Pakistan who was convicted on June 9, 2009, of conspiring to provide material support to terrorism in the United States and abroad. His trial was a bench trial. He was sentenced in 2009 to 13 years in prison, to be followed by 30 years of supervised release. At the time of his arrest (on March 23, 2006), he was an undergraduate at the Georgia Institute of Technology, majoring in mechanical engineering.

== Life ==
Ahmed's family immigrated from Pakistan to the United States when he was about 12 years old, settling in the Atlanta, Georgia area. He became a U.S. citizen in 2003. His father, Syed Riaz Ahmed, is a faculty member at North Georgia College & State University.

== Arrest ==
In March 2005, Ahmed traveled along with Ehsanul Islam Sadequee to Toronto, Ontario, Canada aboard a Greyhound bus to meet with Fahim Ahmad, Jahmaal James and another youth with whom they had spoken online about their mutual interpretation of Islam and jihad. Although the five had discussed hypothetical scenarios in which North America would be attacked, government documents noted there was "no imminent danger". Police informant Mubin Shaikh later stated that he believed the two Americans had been asking whether they would be able to hide in Canada if they were to carry out attacks in the United States. Witnesses later testified that Sadequee and Ahmed might have been inspired by a 2005 film, Paradise Now, about two Palestinian friends being trained to carry out a suicide bombing in Israel. Ahmed was further alleged to have traveled to Pakistan in late 2005 in an attempt to meet with members of the terrorist organization, Lashkar-e-Taiba.

On March 23, 2006, Ahmed and Sadequee were arrested after recording so called "casing videos" of "significant commercial buildings". They were charged with providing material support to a terrorist group, and pleaded not guilty. After several men were arrested in Toronto in June 2006 on charges of terrorism, Ahmed and Sadequee were identified as a co-conspirators and both were indicted on July 19, 2006 (this indictment superseding the original one) for conspiring to provide material support to terrorists and conspiring to provide support to a designated foreign terrorist organization, Lashkar-e-Taiba ("Army of the Righteous"). Initially, all documents in the case were sealed at the joint request of the government and the defense, but the indictment was later unsealed at the government's request.

During five interviews in March, 2006, Ahmed made a number of self-incriminating statements. Ahmed also led the agents who interviewed him to his parents' home and surrendered the camera that was used for the recordings. At the bail hearing for Sadequee, prosecutors alleged that Ahmed and Sadequee traveled to Washington, D.C. to make "casing videos" of the United States Capitol building, the World Bank, a Masonic temple, and a fuel depot, and that Sadequee then sent the video to now-imprisoned London propagandist Younis Tsouli, better known by his online pseudonym Irhabi007 ("terrorist 007"). Tsouli later confirmed that the pair were the source of the recordings.

In August, 2008, US Magistrate Gerrilyn Brill ruled Ahmed's interrogation statements admissible for trial despite defense assertions that the statements were the result of coercion and deception. Brill wrote that Ahmed was "intelligent and had been interviewed by law enforcement twice before", and, therefore, "there is nothing . . . to suggest that his will was critically affected by the agents' various appeals to his Muslim beliefs and there is nothing inherently coercive about such tactics." Although Ahmed had referred to the videos and the discussions with other Muslims as "stupid", he had admitted to the interviewing agents that the recordings could have been used in planning terrorist acts.

Ahmed and Sadequee were reindicted by a federal grand jury in December, 2008. Both men were again charged with conspiring to provide material support to terrorists, including trying to join Lashkar-e-Taiba in 2005. According to the new indictment, the videos were passed to another convicted British terrorist, Aabid Hussain Khan, on whose computer they were found subsequent to his own arrest.
