= Cairine Wilson Secondary School =

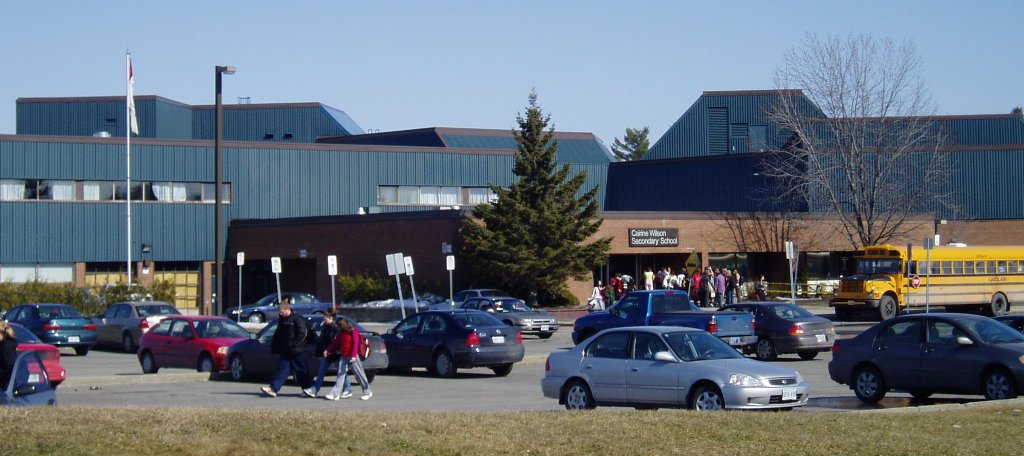

Location
- 975 Orleans Boulevard; Ottawa, Ontario, K1C 2Z5; Canada; 45.48237°N 75.53985°W

Information
- Motto: "Carpe Diem" (Seize the Day)
- Founded: 1975
- School board: Ottawa Carleton District School Board
- Superintendent: Mary Jane Farrish
- Area trustee: Keith Penny
- Principal: Andrew Murphy
- Grades: 9-12
- Enrollment: 792 (2019)
- Campus: Suburban
- Colours: Blue and Orange
- Mascot: Willy the Wildcat
- Team name: Wildcats
- Feeder schools: Terry Fox ES, Henry Larsen ES, Emily Carr MS, Heritage ES, Trillium ES
- Public transit access: OC Transpo Route 138, Route 38, Route 237
- Website: cairinewilsonss.ocdsb.ca

Cairine Wilson Secondary School is an Ottawa-Carleton District School Board high school in Ottawa, Ontario, Canada. It is the main English-language school in the eastern suburb of Orleans. It is located on 975 Orleans Boulevard in the northern edge of the suburb, near the Ottawa River. The school opened in 1975. It was named after Cairine Wilson, Canada's first female Senator.

== Courses offered ==
- French Immersion,
- Outdoor Education,
- Transportation Technology (Auto-shop),
- Foods and Nutrition,
- Comparative World Religions and Philosophy,
- Law and Business,
- Fine Arts including Visual Arts, Drama, Integrated theatrical production course, Instrumental music,
- Physical Education,
- Family studies,
- Co-operative Placements,
- Computer Technology,
- Media studies,
- Integrated cross curricular Character Education program,

== Sports ==
Cairine Wilson SS has an athletics program with over 11 sports teams that are regular top contenders in the National Capital Secondary Schools Athletic Association. They Offer Multiple different teams, such as Rugby, Soccer, Basketball, Baseball, Hockey, Swimming, Touch Football, Field Hockey, and more.

== Stabbing incident ==
On Thursday, April 20, 2000 a 15-year-old boy entered the school with a kitchen knife (steak knife) in his backpack, which he brought from home. The boy could not be named due to the Young Offenders Act after being charged with one count of attempted murder, five counts of assault with a weapon and one count of possessing a dangerous weapon.

The incident began with an argument during lunch hour, outside the library on the second floor. The boy threatened a fellow student before finally stabbing him with a knife. The boy then ran through the school and stabbed another student, while a third student was stabbed by the computer room and two more inside the room. One of the victims was a technician who was stabbed in the back. The principal at the time, Michael Jordan, talked the teenaged boy down and convinced him to give up the knife, but not before attempting to inflict wounds on his own wrists.

The boy was afterwards described as a "loner" and had often been bullied and teased about his appearance.

== Notable alumni ==
- Robert Esche (NHL player, president of the Utica Comets)
- Tom Green (Actor, comedian)
- Rachel Homan (Olympic curler)
- Devon Nichoslon (Olympic wrestler)
- Cassandre Prosper (basketball player)
- Marc Savard (NHL player)
- Aaron Ward (NHL player, sportscaster)
- Steve Washburn (NHL player)
- Sean Whyte (NHL player)
- Nishanthan Yogakrishnan (Conspirator in the 2006 Ontario terrorism plot.)

== See also ==
- Education in Ontario
- List of secondary schools in Ontario
