= Aabid Khan =

- Occupations: Criminal, terrorist

Aabid Khan is a British man from Bradford, England, who was convicted in August 2008 of being a "terrorist propagandist".

== Life ==
Khan worked at the At Tibyan website, run by Younes Tsouli. "His naivety was combined with a deadly seriousness", and he spoke about setting up a miniature Islamic state in Scotland.

He was accused of "grooming and radicalising" Mohammed Atif Siddique, who was later arrested as he prepared to fly to Pakistan to meet with Khan, and charged with collecting photographs and videos of notable terrorist actions.

== Arrest and trial ==
Arrested in June 2006 by British authorities, at London Heathrow Airport as he arrived from a flight from Islamabad as PIA Flight 785 from Pakistan International Airlines - Khan asked police if his father would find out about the "incriminating" documents found in his luggage, later after the Toronto 18 youth suspects were arrested.

In 2008, videos of the 2006 Canadian terrorism camps were released as evidence in the trial, allowing Canadian media to work around a publication ban that forbid them from disclosing information gleaned from the ongoing Canadian trial. In August 2008, in a London court, he was sentenced to 12 years in prison for attempting to incite an act of terrorism. American citizens who are involved in the case are Syed Haris Ahmed and Ehsanul Sadequee were convicted in Atlanta, Georgia and were sentenced to 13 and 17 years respectively on terrorism and conspiracy charges.
