= Zakaria Amara =

Jordanian detainee

- Born: August 18, 1985 (age 41); Jordan
- Citizenship: Jordanian (1985–present); Canadian (1985–2015; 2017–present)
- Status: parole
- Convictions: Pleaded Guilty: receiving terrorist training and participating in a terrorist group; intent to harm or kill with explosives
- Criminal charges: 2006 Toronto terrorism arrests: receiving terrorist training and participating in a terrorist group (x2); recruiting for a terrorist group; intent to harm or kill with explosives; instructing a person to carry out an activity for the benefit of a terrorist group
- Penalty: Life imprisonment; eligible for parole in 2016. Paroled in 2022

Zakaria Amara (born August 18, 1985) is one of 17 people detained on June 2 and 3, 2006, in Toronto, Ontario, Canada, in the 2006 Toronto terrorism arrests. He was convicted for planning to launch terrorist attacks against targets in Southern Ontario and was believed to be one of the ringleaders. A dual Canadian-Jordanian citizen at the time of his arrest, Amara was stripped of his Canadian citizenship on September 26, 2015. However, on June 19, 2017, his Canadian citizenship was automatically restored following the passage of Bill C-6.

== Life ==
Amara was born in Jordan and baptized as an Orthodox Christian. He moved to Saudi Arabia at the age of four, and converted to Islam at the age of ten. Amara moved to Cyprus, his mother's home country, when he was 10 and stayed there until 1997, when he immigrated to Canada at the age of 13.

As a child, Amara attended Meadowvale Secondary School, as well as Milton District High School. He married, moved into a basement apartment with his in-laws on Periwinkle Crescent, and enrolled at Humber College where he was studying Electronics Engineering Technology.

Described as "funny" and "sociable", he worked part-time as a Canadian Tire gas station attendant to offset costs of his schooling. Amara was an Honour Roll student in high school and later dropped out of Ryerson University.

== Terrorist activities ==
Amara is considered one of the ringleaders in the plot and was originally close to Fahim Ahmad. He grew tired with his lack of action and broke away from Ahmed's group.

He had looked at websites which led investigators to believe he was trying to find instructions on bomb making.

In February 2006, Mubin Shaikh reported to police that Amara had shown him a primitive detonator he had built to be activated by cell phone. This led investigators to "gain access" to Amara's apartment and study the device. He is alleged to have brought Shareef Abdelhaleem into his plot, giving him money. Abdelhaleem then gave C$2,000 to an unidentified police mole in the case as a "downpayment" on 3 tonnes of ammonium nitrate which the mole claimed he would purchase.

== Arrest ==
The Mississauga apartment of the 20-year-old Amara was surrounded by police, who positioned snipers on the rooftops of nearby houses. Neighbours brought lawn chairs into their yards, made popcorn and enjoyed watching the three-hour spectacle leading up to Amara's arrest to the end.

His solicitor, David Kolinsky, has claimed that Amara was mistreated by a prison guard, after being allegedly abused while being searched.

On September 19, 2006, Amara was denied bail in a Brampton courtroom.

== Trial ==
Amara was charged with four offences under Canada's Anti-terrorism Act: two counts of receiving terrorist training and participating in a terrorist group, one count of recruiting for a terrorist group and one count of intent to set off an explosion with the aim of causing bodily harm or great damage.

As a result of preferred direct indictment by the Crown Attorney on 24 September 2007, Amara was rearrested and charged with knowingly instructing a person to carry out an activity for the benefit of a terrorist group.

On October 8, 2009, Amara pleaded guilty to two counts: "knowingly participating in a terrorist group and intending to cause an explosion for the benefit of a terrorist group".

Amara stated he had learned how to construct a fertilizer bomb over the internet and planned to use it on the Toronto Stock Exchange. Royal Canadian Mounted Police (RCMP) officials say the type of bomb he was constructing could have killed hundreds after they reconstructed his techniques.

On January 18, 2010, Amara was sentenced 21 months' imprisonment for the camp plot. In arriving at that sentence, the judge credited Amara with seven years and three months for the 43 months, 2 weeks and 4 days that he had spent in pre-sentence custody. Hence, on that count, he received the equivalent of a nine-year sentence and did not contest that sentence on appeal.

On January 21, 2010, Amara's sentence was extended to life imprisonment. Mr. Justice Bruce Durno's decision is the stiffest punishment imposed in the terrorism conspiracy and also the stiffest punishment imposed to date under Canada's antiterrorism laws, which Parliament passed in the aftermath of al-Qaeda's 2001 terrorist attacks against the United States. Amara was ineligible for parole until 2016.

== Imprisonment and parole ==
A week before his sentence Amara released a public statement apologizing for his actions and renouncing extremism.

While serving his sentence, Amara received a letter in September 2015 saying his Canadian citizenship had been revoked, making it possible he would be deported to Jordan when he gets out of prison. On February 25, 2016, the Canadian government introduced legislation that could allow Amara to regain his Canadian citizenship. Immigration Minister Ahmed Hussen confirmed during an interview in March 2017 that Amara's citizenship would be restored following Bill C-6's passage, and on June 19, 2017 he regained his Canadian citizenship. Amara was the only person whose citizenship was stripped under the Conservative government's Bill C-24.

Amara was granted day parole in November 2022 and has since found employment. In a decision to extend his parole in 2023, a panel of the Parole Board of Canada described him as, "committed to [his] long-term rehabilitation and [his] reintegration into the community has gone well to date." In October 2026, he was granted full parole.
