= Shiv Jalota =

British actor (born 1993)

- Born: Shiv Jalota; 26 December 1993 (age 32); Kingston upon Thames, Surrey, England
- Occupation: Actor
- Years active: 2015–present
- Television: EastEnders

Shiv Jalota (born 26 December 1993) is an English actor, known for portraying the role of Vinny Panesar on the BBC soap opera EastEnders since 2019.

== Early life ==
Jalota was born on 26 December 1993 in Kingston upon Thames. He studied drama at Richmond Drama School and later joined the National Youth Theatre in 2013 after it was recommended by a friend, where he appeared in the stage production Homegrown: a true story.

== Career ==
Jalota credited the theatre company for helping him to break into the entertainment industry. He subsequently went on to appear in an array of stage shows including Pigeon English, Romeo and Juliet, DNA, The Grapes of Wrath, Mother Courage and Her Children, Catalyst and Pappy Show. In 2016, he made his short film debut, appearing as a gym-goer in Heavy Weight. In 2018, Jalota secured the lead role of Christopher Boone in the play The Curious Incident of the Dog in the Night-Time, becoming the first British-Asian actor to do so. Of his casting, Jalota said he "found it a relief to jump out of standard BAME personas" and added that it was "more rewarding and not associated at all with [his] ethnicity."

In 2019, Jalota was cast in the BBC soap opera EastEnders as Vinny Panesar, the youngest brother in the Panesar family. He made his on-screen debut on 29 October, arriving alongside the character's brothers Kheerat (Jaz Deol) and Jags (Amar Adatia). His character's storylines on the show have included his relationship with Dotty Cotton (Milly Zero) and the introduction of and relationship with his parents Suki (Balvinder Sopal) and Nish (Navin Chowdhry).

== Filmography ==
=== Short film ===
Year	Title	Role	Notes
2016	Heavy Weight	Gym goer	
2019	White Girl	Unknown	

=== Television ===
Year	Title	Role	Notes
2019–present	EastEnders	Vinny Panesar	Regular role

== Stage ==
Year	Title	Role	Venue	Ref.
2015	Homegrown: a true story	Shiv	National Youth Theatre	
2016	Pigeon English	Dizzy	Ambassadors Theatre	
2016	Romeo and Juliet	Benvollio	Ambassadors Theatre	
2016	DNA	Adam	Ambassadors Theatre	
2017	The Grapes of Wrath	Al Joad	West Yorkshire Playhouse	
2017	Mother Courage and Her Children	Company	Southwark Playhouse	
2018	Catalyst	Kurt	The North Wall Theatre	
2018	Pappy Show	Boys	New Diorama	
2018	The Curious Incident of the Dog in the Night-Time	Christopher Boone	National Theatre	
2019	Orange Juice	Adam	Tristan Bates Theatre	
