= Young offenders in the 2006 Ontario terrorism plot =

Offenders in terrorism plot

Among the 18 arrests during the 2006 Toronto terrorism case were four youths whose names could not be published because of the provisions of Canada's Youth Criminal Justice Act. One of them had the charges against him dropped nine months after his arrest and two others have been released on bail.

Two of the youths were former Hindus, who converted to Islam, similar to older suspect Steven Vikash Chand, who also used to be Hindu.

== Nishanthan Yogakrishnan ==
Nishanthan Yogakrishnan, aged 17 at the time of arrest, was the sole youth whose case went to trial and was found guilty of conspiracy.

He had moved to Canada with his family from Sri Lanka in 1994.

Following the camping trip in Orillia, friends had suggested he should cut off the Prime Minister's head since he had enjoyed chopping wood so much. Described by Shaikh as "a few fries short of a Happy Meal", the youth had suggested that the group convert the Aboriginal peoples in Canada to Islam, and then offer them control of Quebec City and Montreal in exchange for killing Quebeckers.

At the trial, RCMP mole Mubin Shaikh was accused of "confecting evidence" in order to protect the youth by the crown prosecutor who made the rare move of labeling his own witness as hostile. The youth was accused of shoplifting camping gear from a Canadian Tire, and removing a spy-camera that had been placed outside the ringleader's apartment door by the police.

He was sentenced to 2 years which was already served, and released in May 2009 although a DNA sample was taken and he was given 2 years probation and a 10-year prohibition against owning weapons. The publication ban was lifted after his guilt was determined.

== John Doe #1 ==
John Doe #1, who was 15 years old at the time of the arrest, was a Grade 10 student at Stephen Leacock Collegiate Institute in Toronto. He had converted to Islam from Hinduism several years earlier, upsetting his mother. He is said to have hung out with 19-year-old Amin Mohamed Durrani. His math textbook was taken by police as evidence.

Sharing a room with his older brother, he was an avid soccer player, and hoped to grow up to become a veterinarian. He was often mentioning wanting a pet dog. He faked a school outing, as an excuse to attend a survival camp with another of the young offenders. He told his mother that he had nightmares and fears about deserting Islam, concerned that he would go to hell.

He was denied bail on June 27, 2006, but was granted bail for C$15,000 on July 16, 2006 in another hearing, and was released to his parents.

All charges against him were dropped on February 23, 2007.

== John Doe #2 ==
John Doe #2, who was 17 at the time of the alleged incident, was a Grade 12 student at Stephen Leacock Collegiate in Toronto. He had recently converted to Islam from Hinduism, which resulted in fights with his parents, and his alleged prayer in secret. He is said to have hung out with 19-year-old Amin Mohamed Durrani. He was denied bail on June 27, 2007.

== John Doe #3 ==
John Doe #3 was also a student at Stephen Leacock Collegiate.

== Other information ==
All four youths were held at the Maplehurst Correctional Centre in Milton, Ontario, three were released on bail in July 2006. Three youths, it is unclear if they are the same three, had all charges stayed by September 2007.
