= Stephen Leacock Collegiate Institute =

Public middle school in Toronto, Ontario, Canada

Stephen Leacock Collegiate Institute John Buchan Senior Public School
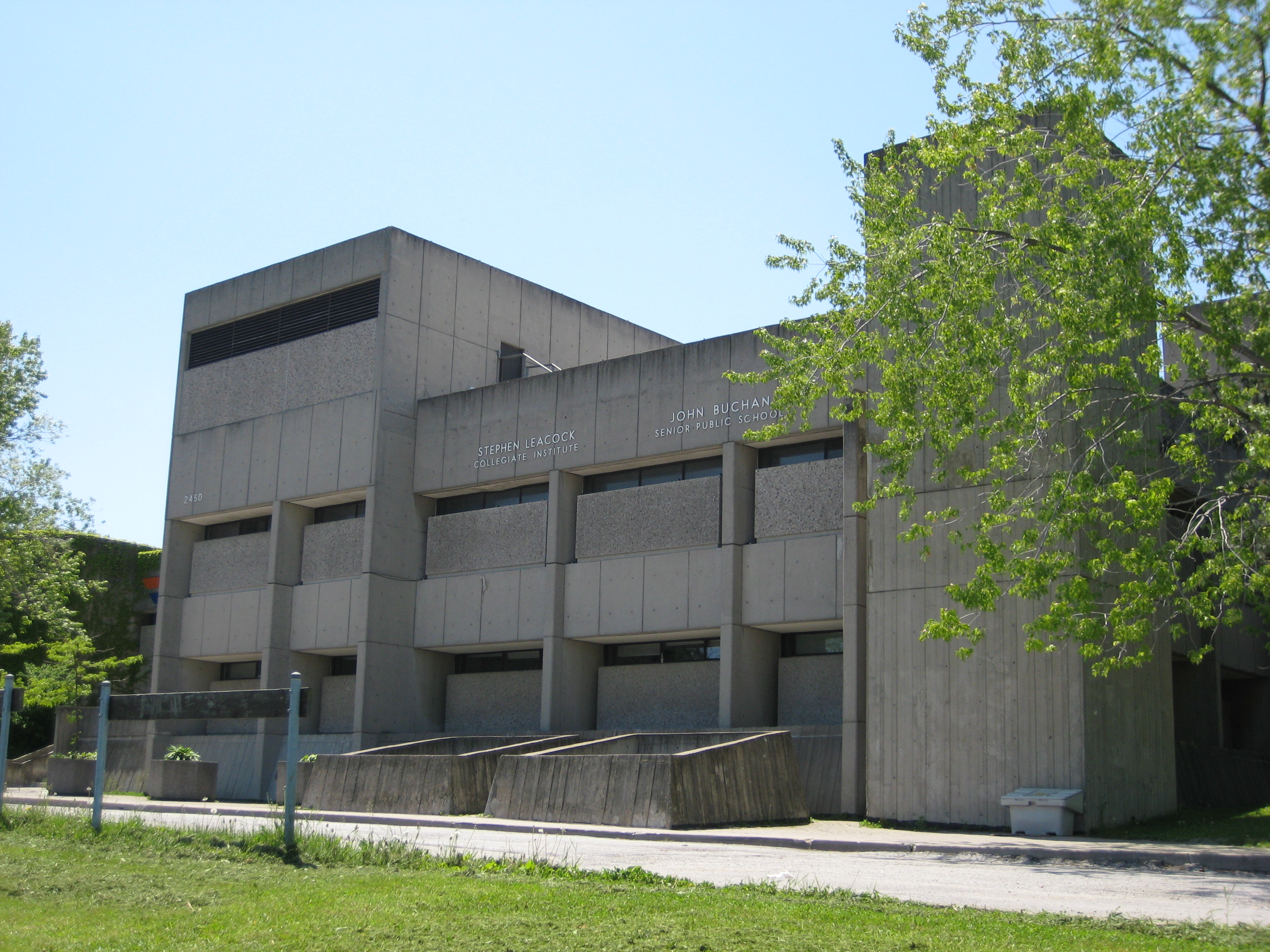

Location
- 2450 Birchmount Road; Toronto, Ontario, M1T 2M5; Canada; 43.78568°N 79.30136°W

Information
- School type: Public middle school Public high school
- Motto: Tuum Est (It is up to you)
- Religious affiliation: none
- Founded: 1969 (Buchan); 1970 (Leacock)
- School board: Toronto District School Board (Scarborough Board of Education)
- Oversight: Toronto Lands Corporation
- Superintendent: Brendan Browne; LC2, Executive; Helen Fisher (acting); LN07
- Area trustee: Manna Wong; Ward 20
- School number: 4208 / 945250; 4609 / 283371
- Principals: Leacock: Saverio Zupo; Buchan: Kwabena Yafeu
- Enrolment: 983 (2014-15)
- Language: English
- Colours: Blue and orange
- Mascot: Lions
- Team name: Leacock Lions
- Website: stephenleacockci.ca

Stephen Leacock Collegiate Institute and John Buchan Senior Public School are two public middle and secondary schools in Toronto, Ontario, Canada. The schools are owned and operated by the Toronto District School Board that were originally part of the Scarborough Board of Education of the former suburb of Scarborough. Serving the Tam O'Shanter – Sullivan community, the school offers business, math and technology courses. Leacock's motto is Tuum Est, Latin for "It is Up to You".

== History ==
Built in 1969 on a 20-acre property on Birchmount Road north of Sheppard Avenue, John Buchan opened on September 2, 1969 and Stephen Leacock Collegiate opened on September 8, 1970 as the borough's fifteenth collegiate institute. Both schools are connected to one building on Birchmount Road and form a larger kindergarten to Grade 12 campus with Pauline Johnson Jr. Public School. The school was designed by architects, Abram and Ingelson, following trends of brutalist architecture. The schools were named after John Buchan, the fifteenth Governor General of Canada and Stephen Leacock, an English Canadian teacher, political scientist, writer, and humourist.

== Overview ==
Leacock offers the APEX Advanced Placement program.

=== Structure ===
Both Leacock and Buchan are situated in one building located on 2450 Birchmount Road. Both schools share an auditorium and library while the layout is separated from the rest of both schools. Located in 21 acres at a combined 247,263 sq. ft. building with three floors, the two schools contain over 40 classrooms/science labs, two floor library, cafeteria, specialized television and radio studios, four gym spaces, 1000 seat auditorium with DMX lighting consoles and a three-bay automotive shop.

The 23 m, six lane pool is shared by both schools and is overseen by the board's realtor subsidiary, Toronto Lands Corporation. It is also used by several swimming clubs and schools, including C & C Aquatic Club, Champion Athletic Club, Chaco’s Winner Swimming Club, J. Dolphins School of Swimming and Wendy and Yaya's School of Swimming.

== Notable alumni ==
- Linda Ballantyne, voice actress
- Bill Carroll, radio broadcaster
- Gary Dillon, NHL hockey player
- John Does 1, 2, and 3, unnamed juvenile members of the Toronto 18
- Amin Durrani, member of the Toronto 18
- "Tarzan" Dan Freeman, radio DJ and television host
- Steve Guolla, former NHL hockey player
- Jeff Harding, former NHL hockey player
- Mark Kirton, NHL hockey player
- Stacey McKenzie, fashion model
- Mark McKoy, 1992 Olympic Gold Medalist 110M Hurdles
- Mike Myers, actor, comedian, screenwriter, former Saturday Night Live castmember (also attended Sir John A. Macdonald Collegiate Institute)
- Elva Ni, winner of the Miss Chinese Toronto Pageant, 2005
- Fred Patterson, Humble and Fred, co-host, 102.1 The Edge
- Bill Root, NHL hockey player
- Vicky Sunohara, former ice hockey player, Olympic gold medallist
- Behn Wilson, former NHL hockey player, Philadelphia Flyers and Chicago Blackhawks

== See also ==
- Education in Ontario
- List of secondary schools in Ontario
