= Saad Khalid =

Canadian terrorist (born 1986)

- Born: August 12, 1986 (age 40); Saudi Arabia
- Occupation: University of Toronto business student
- Conviction: Pleaded guilty: Intent to cause an explosion
- Criminal charges: 2006 Toronto terrorism arrests: Participation in a terrorist group(charges expected to be dropped); Training in a terrorist group(charges expected to be dropped); Intent to cause an explosion

Saad Khalid (born August 12, 1986) was one of 17 people detained and arrested on June 2 and June 3, 2006, in the Greater Toronto Area in the 2006 Toronto terrorism arrests.

He was involved with a group of people suspected in the planning of coordinated bombing attacks against targets in southern Ontario. He was the first to plead guilty to intent to cause an explosion, while seven others were acquitted and five others, including a juvenile, were also convicted.

== Life ==
Khalid was born August 12, 1986, in Saudi Arabia to Pakistani parents. Khalid moved to Canada with his parents from Pakistan at the age of 8. He played in the Erin Mills Soccer Club league.

He graduated from Meadowvale Secondary School, where he had started an Islamic Club and led Friday prayers in the lecture hall, which he attended with fellow arrestees Fahim Ahmad and Zakaria Amara. He was known among students for lecturing others not to take illegal drugs, or get in fights. He enrolled and was accepted to University of Toronto in Mississauga.

== Arrest ==
Khalid attended the training camp with many of the other arrestees and had used a video camera in the downtown area for reconnaissance. He rented the warehouse space for the ammonium nitrate where he and Saad Gaya were later arrested.

Khalid was arrested in a warehouse alongside one of the five who cannot be named. The two had been lining cardboard boxes with plastic to store the fertilizer. Khalid had told his parents he was attending a job fair.

He was denied bail on July 17, 2006, and has since been in solitary confinement.

== Guilty plea ==
On May 4, 2009, Khalid pleaded guilty before judge Bruce Durno to a single count of acting "with the intention of causing an explosion or explosions that were likely to cause serious bodily harm or death or damage property". In return, it was expected that charges of participation in a terrorist group and training in furtherance of a terrorist group would be dropped. Lawyers for the other accused members still pending trial sought to have a publication ban prohibit all mention in the media of the guilty plea, but were largely unsuccessful. Durno's decision stated that "there has been no finding of guilt or conviction" simply because of the plea.

On September 3, 2009, Khalid was sentenced to 14 years in prison with credit of 7 years for time already served. He is eligible for parole after serving a third of his sentence since 2009. The Ontario Court of Appeal later increased the sentence to 20 years.

== Recalling his radicalization in prison ==
According to a CBC News report detailing a series of exclusive letters CBC News exchanged with Khalid, at some point in his first term at University of Toronto he discovered a series of online lectures by American-born al-Qaeda cleric Anwar al-Awlaki (who was killed in a U.S. drone strike in Yemen in 2011).

"He had a knack for telling a good story, so when I came across his lectures on jihad, I was hooked" Khalid writes.

"Here was someone I respected and he was connecting global grievances that Muslims share with what your responsibility is in terms of these issues."

"I was left with the understanding that it was religiously incumbent on me to assist in defending Muslims whose land had been invaded."

He has spent time in counselling with an imam during his time in prison.

"When we did talk about questions I had, he essentially challenged me and my arguments," Khalid writes. "When I didn’t have any answers for him, that is when I really began to analyze my actions and thinking. He provided me with material that argued against the legality of terrorism."

Khalid now says he knows his actions weren't right. He has apologized to Canadian Muslims and Canadians in general for what he did. He insists that he did not hate Canada, Canadians or non-Muslims and that he was against Canadian foreign policy specifically in Afghanistan.
