= Rocco Galati =

Canadian lawyer (born 1959)

- Born: 1959 (age 66–67); Calabria, Italy
- Occupation: Lawyer
- Organization: Constitutional Rights Centre
- Website: https://www.constitutionalrightscentre.ca/

Rocco Galati (born 1959) is an Italian-born Canadian lawyer who specializes in cases involving constitutional law. He is the founder and executive director of the Constitutional Rights Centre.

== Early life and education ==
Galati was born in Calabria, Italy and his family immigrated to Canada in 1965. He graduated from McGill University in 1984 with a Bachelor of Arts and then graduated from Osgoode Hall Law School in 1987.

== Career ==
After his Call to the bar he worked at the federal Department of Justice.

=== Criminal cases ===
In 2001, Galati defended Delmart Vreeland at trial.

Galati was Abdurahman Khadr's first lawyer. In late 2003, Galati resigned from all national security cases after being the target of death threats. Galati said a threat left on his answering machine stated: "Well, Mr. Galati. What's this I hear about you working with the terrorist now, helping to get that (expletive) punk terrorist Khadr off. You a dead wop." Galati requested 24-hour surveillance of his house; when the RCMP refused to provide this, he declared that "we now live in Colombia because the rule of law is meaningless" and later indicated he believed the call came from American intelligence. Mr Galati went on to claim: "The voice is similar and likely the same as a voice of someone who threatened one of our former clients," he said, adding later that "in that case, our client disappeared."' Galati later characterized the threats as "institutional" and "governmental" but did not elaborate.

In 2006, Galati represented Ahmad Mustafa Ghany, a suspect in the 2006 Ontario terrorism plot. In 2008, charges were stayed against Ghany and three other defendants.

=== Nadon challenge ===
On October 7, 2013, Galati brought a court application that challenged the appointment of Justice Marc Nadon to the Supreme Court of Canada on the basis of Nadon being ineligible as under the Quebec provisions of the Supreme Court Act. The Act requires that three members of the Supreme Court be from Quebec. The Quebec government announced that it would also challenge Nadon's appointment.

The government responded to Galati's application on October 22, 2013 by amending the Supreme Court Act and bringing a reference question to the Supreme Court. Galati was granted intervenor status at the hearing.

On March 21, 2014, the Supreme Court ruled in Reference Re Supreme Court Act, ss 5 and 6 that Nadon was ineligible under the Quebec provisions of the Act, and that changes to the Act required unanimous constitutional amendment. Nadon's appointment was voided. The court did not accept Galati's argument that federal court judges from Quebec are not eligible for appointment to the permanent Quebec seats on the Supreme Court of Canada. Galati agreed to end his own legal challenge following the ruling.

The Federal Court of Canada later awarded Galati $5,000 for his fees in bringing his application. Galati appealed, arguing he should be awarded $51,706.54 for his time spent arguing the case. The Federal Court of Appeal disagreed, and issued a sharply worded decision that compared his arguments to the "gonzo logic of the Vietnam War era." The court ruled that Galati and his legal partner Paul Slansky were not legally successful in their application, even if they may have initiated a series of events leading to the reference question. Galati and Slansky were ordered to pay $1,000 in legal costs to the government.

==== Mainville challenge ====
After the Supreme Court ruled against the Nadon appointment, in June 2014 Galati brought an application challenging the appointment of Justice Robert Mainville to the Quebec Court of Appeal. In April 2015, the court ruled unanimously that the justice department acted within its constitutional powers in the Mainville appointment.

=== Bank of Canada case ===
In 2011, Galati brought a case against the Canadian government to restore the Bank of Canada as a lender to the government. The case was brought on behalf of the Committee on Monetary and Economic Reform. COMER argued that the Bank of Canada is mandated to provide debt-free financing for public projects undertaken by federal, provincial and municipal governments.

COMER's claims were struck five times by the courts. On May 4, 2017, the Supreme Court dismissed COMER'S application for leave to appeal the most recent decision.

On February 8, 2016 Justice Russell struck COMER's amended claim in its entirety and refused leave to amend the claim. Costs were awarded to the crown. In his ruling, Justice Russell stated "their response convinces me that, for reasons given, they have no scintilla of a cause of action that this Court can or should hear."

On March 3, 2016 COMER filed a notice of appeal with the Court of Appeal.

On December 7, 2016 the appeal was dismissed. On May 4, 2017 the Supreme Court dismissed COMER's application for leave to appeal this decision.

=== COVID-19 ===
Galati has been a vocal opponent of COVID-19 vaccines and government measures in response to the COVID-19 pandemic in Canada. In this regard, he has represented a range of individuals and organizations. Examples include Dr. Rochagné Kilian of Owen Sound, who is part of a group of Ontario doctors accused of freely dispensing vaccine exemptions, Action4Canada and Vaccine Choice Canada.

On July 6, 2020, Galati filed a lawsuit on behalf of Vaccine Choice Canada challenging Canada's provincial and national COVID-19 response. Among the named defendants were the Government of Canada, Government of Ontario, the City of Toronto, and the Canadian Broadcasting Corporation (CBC). Galati was also involved in the preparation of a lawsuit against COVID-19 vaccine mandates at the University of Waterloo, in coordination with the Canadian chapter of Children's Health Defense. Prospective plaintiffs were instructed to prepare to pay $2,000 to join the suit, and that they may be "on the hook" for an additional $2,000 if the suit was unsuccessful.

In January 2022, Galati was seriously ill in the ICU.

In August 2022, Justice Alan Ross of the Supreme Court of British Columbia struck a COVID-19 vaccine mandate lawsuit brought by Galati against the Government of British Columbia, describing the claim as "bad beyond argument". Among other issues, Justice Ross noted in his decision that the civil claim included "improper allegations, including criminal conduct and ‘crimes against humanity.’" A similar suit was struck by Federal Court Judge Simon Fothergill in February 2023 on the same grounds.

Galati attempted to continue the COVID-19 vaccine mandate lawsuit by filing an amended civil claim on August 6, 2025. Justice Gordon C. Weatherill struck the lawsuit in its entirety on September 24, 2026. In the decision, Justice Weatherill commented that the lawsuit was "a textbook example of a scandalous, embarrassing, and frivolous pleading".

In March 2023, Galati filed a class action lawsuit against the Regional Municipality of York and York Regional Police on behalf of employees fired or placed on leave as a result of the municipality's mandatory COVID-19 vaccination policy.

On December 11, 2023, Justice William Chalmers of the Ontario Superior Court of Justice dismissed a defamation lawsuit filed by Galati against multiple defendants, including the Canadian Society for the Advancement of Science in Public Policy (CSASPP), finding that the suit was intended to silence criticism of a proposed class action lawsuit related to COVID-19 restrictions.

On December 18, 2024, another proposed class action suit brought by Galati was rejected by the Ontario Superior Court of Justice on the grounds that it lacked a reasonable cause of action, constituted an abuse of process, and that the court had no jurisdictional authority over the matter. The suit was brought on behalf of 473 plaintiffs, many of whom were unionized and had not exhausted the mandatory arbitration process.
