= Mass surveillance in Canada =

The Edward Snowden revelation that the Communications Security Establishment (CSE), without a warrant, used free airport Wi-Fi service to gather the communications of all travellers using the service and to track them after they had left the airport sparked an ongoing unfounded concern about mass surveillance in Canada. It was reported but unverified that the number of Canadians affected by this surveillance is unknown apparently even to the Canadian Security Intelligence Service.

== Key Government Bodies ==
The Department of National Defence (DND), the Communications Security Establishment, CFINTCOM and the Canadian Security Intelligence Service (CSIS)

== Communications Security Establishment Canada (CSE) ==
The Communications Security Establishment OF Canada (CSE) is Canada's signals intelligence agency. The agency is responsible for foreign signals intelligence and for protecting the Canadian government's electronic information and communication networks. It reports to the Minister of National Defence, who is accountable to Cabinet and Parliament. CSE is part of the Five Eyes, or the alliance of spying agencies of the United States, Australia, New Zealand, the United Kingdom and Canada.

CSE originated in World War II, as a military signals corps meant to collect foreign intelligence signals. The agency only came into public awareness, however, with the 1974 CBC TV documentary The Fifth Estate: The Espionage Establishment. Since the events of 9/11 and Canada's subsequent 2001 Anti-Terrorism Act, the CSE's capacities have expanded, in terms of legal mandate, available technology, and financial resources. Today, it employs roughly 2000 people and its estimated 2015-2016 budget was $1.075 billion. The agency expects a net increase of $59.5 million in federal funding in the coming year

The 2001 Anti-Terrorism Act amended the National Defence Act to establish the CSE's mandate as follows:

- To acquire and use information from the global information infrastructure for the purpose of providing foreign intelligence, in accordance with Government of Canada intelligence priorities.
- To provide advice, guidance and services to help ensure the protection of electronic information and of information infrastructures of importance to the Government of Canada.
- To provide technical and operational assistance to federal law enforcement and security agencies in the performance of their lawful duties.

CSE is bound by all Canadian laws. The agency cannot legally intercept the private communications of Canadians, except for foreign communications that originate or end in Canada. Ministerial authority for such interception is given on a case-by-case basis. Additionally, for reasons of national security, the Security of Information Act permanently binds CSE employees to secrecy, meaning they cannot legally disclose certain information without special authorization.

=== Metadata surveillance ===
A national security measure to track patterns of suspicious activity, the Canadian metadata surveillance program was first implemented in 2005 by secret decree. It was then suspended for a year in 2008, amid concerns that the program could amount to unwarranted surveillance of innocent Canadians. However, the program was renewed in 2011 via ministerial directive from then-Defence Minister Peter MacKay. The program was broadly approved by the CSE Commissioner at the time.

== Incidents and operations ==
=== Project Levitation ===
Project Levitation is a code name for the mass surveillance project by the Communications Security Establishment that started in 2012. It monitored up to 15 million uploads and downloads per day from more than 100 free file-sharing websites.
