= Fahim Ahmad =

Canadian terrorist

- Spouse: Mariya Ahmad
- Conviction: Pleaded Guilty
- Criminal charges: 2006 Toronto terrorism arrests: Participating in a terrorist group; Receiving and providing terrorist training and requirement; Intent to harm or kill with explosives; Importing a firearm

Fahim Ahmad (born August 10, 1984) is one of 11 people convicted in the 2006 Toronto terrorism case. He was a ringleader in the group. He was 21 years old at the time of arrest, and married with two children.

== Life ==
Fahim Ahmad was born in Afghanistan and immigrated to Canada at age 10. He attended Meadowvale Secondary School with fellow suspects Saad Khalid and Zakaria Amara. Friends suggest that he made statements supporting the September 11, 2001 attacks.

Ahmad was unemployed and reportedly handed out self-burned CDs of the as-Sahab video detailing the lives of the hijackers in the September 11 attacks at the Salaheddin Islamic Centre in Toronto.

Ahmad had been under surveillance since 2002, when the 17-year old's internet usage demonstrated that he was in contact with "jihadists in Alberta."

In 2004, the Canadian Security Intelligence Service (CSIS) noticed that he had joined Clearguidance.com a year earlier, an "anti-Western" website on which he logged 754 posts.

Among his posts were statements like:

"Parents' anti-jihad/anti-'religiousness' talks are starting to effect [...] come on bros, i need some jihad talks, anything! its like so dead my sources for videos is no more either, [...] i know u guys can hook me up."

"Nowadays, for the most part, parents don't practice their [religion] much to begin with, and when a kid says, 'o mommy, daddy, i want to fight for ALLAH' automatically they say "NO! U WILL GO TO SCHOOL AND HAVE A FUTURE."

When moderator Salmaan Ziauddin resigned from the website, CSIS approached him several times, asking about specific members of the website, including Ahmad and Zakaria Amara. Ahmad's wife, Mariya, was a student at the University of Toronto and went by the online moniker "Zawjatu Faheem"

== Terrorist activities ==
Fahim Ahmad has been described by law enforcement and the police as the primary ringleader in the plot and a spiritual leader among the men. His original "second in command" was Zakaria Amara; however he apparently grew disenchanted with Ahmad’s lack of action and broke away. Ahmad’s group became the Scarborough group and Amara’s became the Mississauga group. The widely reported goal of "beheading politicians" originated with Ahmad’s group.

In March 2005, Americans Ehsanul Sadequee and Syed Haris Ahmed traveled to Toronto together aboard a Greyhound bus, to meet with Ahmad, Jahmaal James and another youth, whom they had spoken to online about their mutual interpretations of Islam and jihad. While the group discussed hypothetical scenarios in which North America was attacked, the government noted there was "no imminent danger".

Police informant Mubin Shaikh later stated that he believed the two Americans had been asking whether they would be able to hide in Canada if they were to carry out attacks in the United States. Shaikh later stated that Ahmad had told him that "if CSIS ever came to my door," he would shoot them, imitating a gun with his fingers.

Ahmad organized a training camp in December 2005 and held a second camp the following spring. He also sought a safe house in northern Ontario to use as a hideout. Ahmad claimed to have ordered a shipment of weaponry from Mexico.

== Arrest ==
Ahmad was arrested on June 2, 2006. He was charged with receiving and providing terrorist training, and intent to harm or kill with explosives. He was represented by attorney Dennis Edney.

Imam Aly Hindy, referring to the four suspects who attended Salaheddin Islamic Centre, said that Ahmad was the only one who might be guilty of a crime, although not terrorism, for his role in renting a car that Ali Dirie and Yasim Mohamed used to smuggle two handguns across the border.

A year and a half after his arrest, Ahmad said he remained "baffled" why the government thought there was a terrorist plot, and was "still waiting for the government to produce a snippet of credible evidence".

== Trial and guilty plea ==
Ahmad was tried simultaneously with Steven Chand and Asad Ansari, and all pleaded not guilty at the beginning of the trial. The jury heard that he had been a ringleader in a group having held two training camps in 2005. The idea of attacking parliament and beheading politicians was attributed to Ahmad. The court also accused him of plotting to attack nuclear stations and power grids. Police agent Mubin Shaikh testified as to the extremist content of the camps and Ahmad's intent and leadership. On May 10, 2010, in mid-trial, jurors learned that Ahmad had changed his plea to guilty.

On October 25, 2010, Ahmad was sentenced to 16 years in prison, with double credit for the four years he had already spent in custody. This was the first terrorism case in Canada to be decided by a jury.
