= Meadowvale Secondary School =

Location
- 6700 Edenwood Drive; Mississauga, Ontario, L5N 3B2; Canada; 43.5779°N 79.7613°W

Information
- School type: Provincial, High school
- Founded: 1981
- School board: Peel District School Board
- Superintendent: Maxine Miller
- Area trustee: Jeff Clark
- School number: 925551
- Principal: Phiona Lloyd-Henry
- Grades: 9-12
- Enrolment: 950 (Oct 26, 2026)
- Language: English
- Colours: White and baby blue (originally white, baby blue and brown)
- Mascot: Falcon
- Website: meadowvale.peelschools.org
- Last updated: Oct 2, 2025

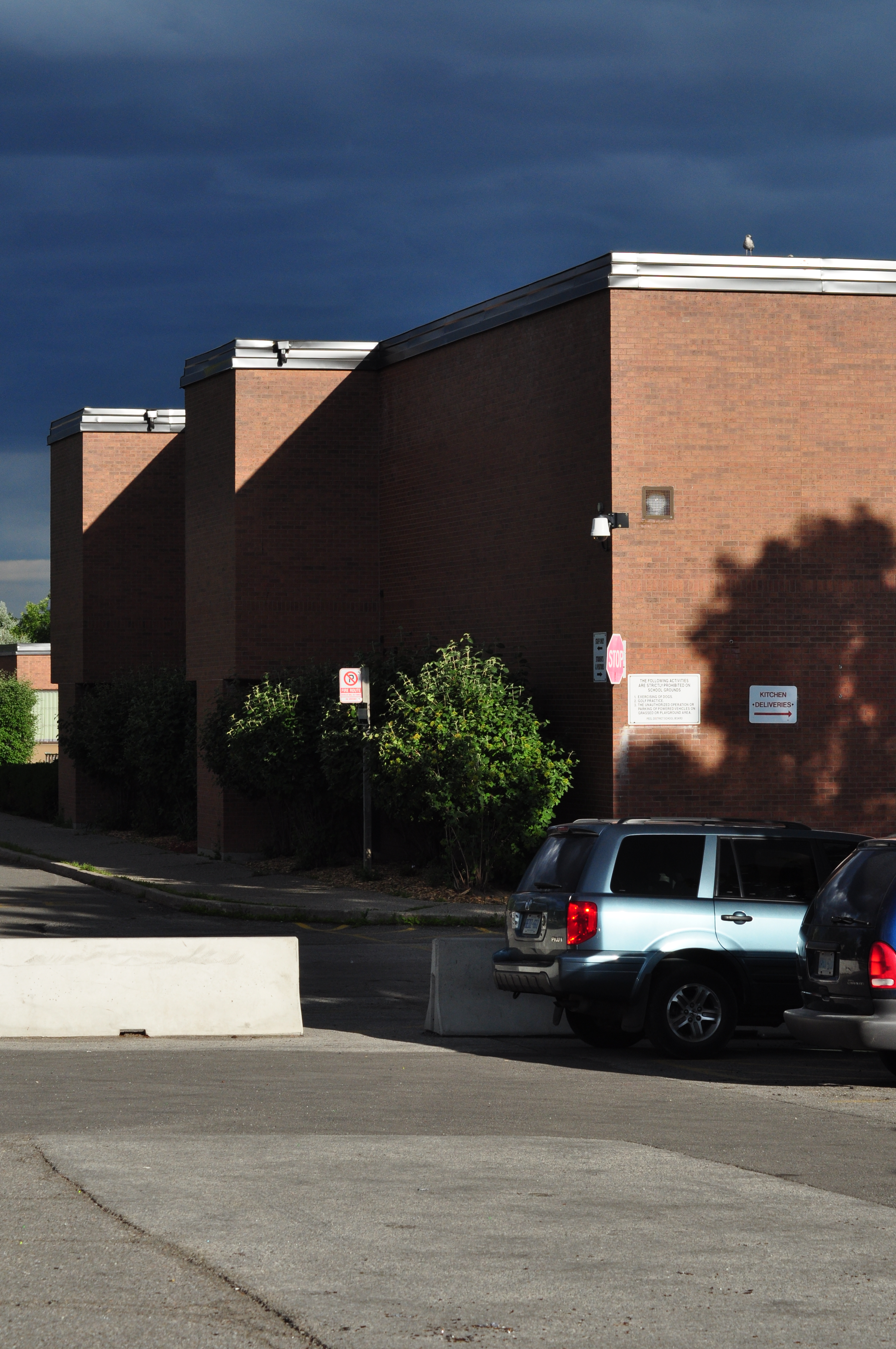

Meadowvale Secondary School is a part of the Peel District School Board in Mississauga, Ontario, Canada. It is located near the intersection of Battleford Road and Edenwood Drive.

Nearby commonly associated school with Meadowvale Secondary School is Our Lady of Mount Carmel and Stephen Lewis Secondary.

The two feeder schools for Meadowvale Secondary School are Edenwood Middle School and Lisgar Middle School.

== Extra curricular activities ==
Meadowvale Secondary School has many extra-curricular opportunities.

The arts program participates in two festivals: the Peel Studentwrights Drama Festival, which features student-written and student-directed works in a non-competitive festival; and the National Theatre School (NTS) DramaFest, a competitive festival. The school has won several awards in the NTS DramaFest including Outstanding Production, and Excellences in Directing, Writing and Ensemble work. Every year, the school puts on a production, either a play or a musical. Productions have included West Side Story, Footloose, Chicago, Matilda, Twelve Angry Jurors and Clue.

The drama department focuses on building student leadership through directing, producing and stage managing, as well as, allows students to explore their creative voice through original student works. Students have graduated from the drama program and gone into film, TV, media related fields, broadcasting, and reporting. Maitreyi Ramakrishnan, star of Netflix's Never Have I Ever, graduated from Meadowvale.

The music program offers instrumental band, jazz band, and a vocal ensemble. Students perform twice a year in evening concerts and several times over lunch hour in Rock in the Lecture Hall events. The drama and music programs work closely together on musicals. The visual arts department runs an art club and the art department features stunning murals throughout the school.

The media department uses PCs and Macs and has a 3D printer. There is also tools like cameras, microphones, and drawing tablets accessible to all students along with Chromebook borrowing (only if you are a student of the school).

The school also offers many athletic opportunities, and has won Peel regional championships in:

- archery (2015)
- badminton (1987,1994,1996-2000,2002-2004,2007,2009,2018)
- baseball (boys- 1992-1993,1998)(girls fastpitch- 1993-1994)
- basketball (girls:junior- 1987,1990, senior- 1996)
- cricket (2004)
- cross country running (1987,1990,2003-2004,2026)
- curling (2006-2007)
- football (junior- 1992, senior- 1993)
- golf (2010,2020)
- gymnastics (junior- 1993, senior- 1983-1986,1989,1992-1993)
- rugby (girls- 2006,2009)
- skiing (1996,2026)
- soccer (boys:junior- 1994,2005,2007, senior- 1990, girls:senior- 2014)
- swimming (1991-1993,2000-2003,2009,2011-2012,2014)
- table tennis (2012)
- tennis (junior- 1986,1996, senior- 1986,1990,1996-1997)
- track and field (1983-1989,1991-1994,1996-1998,2001,2003-2006,2009,2019)
- volleyball (boys:junior- 2005, senior- 1992,2008, girls:junior- 2011, senior- 2004,2008)
- wrestling (1988-1993,2002,2005-2017)

The school also has offered athletic opportunities in cheerleading, cycling, fishing, flag football, ice hockey, lacrosse, ultimate frisbee, war canoe and weightlifting.

== In the media ==
Meadowvale Secondary School was used as the school for the 1988 B-movie The Brain, in which it was renamed "Meadowvale High School".

Between 1998 and 2000, Meadowvale Secondary School was the test site for a pilot program of the Youth News Network. Based on the American Channel One News, it saw the company Athena Educational Partners provide the school with free television sets and computers. In exchange, students would watch a daily newscast (unless they opted out), which included two and a half minutes of advertising. This provoked protest from a variety of community groups, who disagreed with the idea of showing commercials in the classroom.

Former Meadowvale Secondary School student (Rene Charlebois) and two others (Giuseppe (Joseph) Manchisi and Robert Grewal, a former student) were murdered in 2004. Convicted sex offender Douglas Moore was arrested and charged for their murders but while awaiting trial in prison he allegedly killed himself to avoid prosecution.

MSS was thrust into the international media spotlight when three of its former students, Fahim Ahmad, Saad Khalid, and Zakaria Amara were charged in an alleged terror plot, in June 2006

== IBT Program ==
In 2013, Meadowvale started the IBT (International Business Technology) program. This regional program aims to enhance student's thinking and to give them a better understanding of the working world, helping them in Post-Secondary through experiential learning. 84 seats are opened every single year (a total of 320~ in the entire program) and the fee is $200 CAD. Applications are open from November 8 to November 22

The IBT program has 3 executives for each grade level chosen to serve as representatives, chosen by the teacher in charge of the program following an application.

== Notable alumni ==
- Zaiba Baig, Class of 2012; co-creator and star of Sort Of
- Patrick Cederberg, Class of 2008; Canadian Screen Award-winning filmmaker, musician in indie pop band Shy Kids
- Phil Darlington, Class of 2007, (Weatherman) Global News. formerly CTV News.
- Ed Gataveckas, teacher from 1991-2016, Canadian Football League linebacker with the Hamilton Tiger Cats from 1981-1990
- Shauna Hunt, Class of 2002; reporter - City TV
- Dusty Mancinelli, film maker, TIFF winner
- Wesley Morgan, Class of 2008, actor
- Maitreyi Ramakrishnan, Class of 2019; actress of Never Have I Ever
- Luke Reece, Class of 2011; producer, director, playwright, spoken word - Little Black Afro, Obsidian Theatre, Soulpepper Theatre
- Jael Ealey Richardson, Class of 1999; writer and broadcaster
- Ryan Sproul, Class of 2011, NHL professional player - Detroit Red Wings
- Elias Theodorou (1988-2022), Class of 2006, UFC Middleweight fighter & The Ultimate Fighter: Nations winner

== See also ==
- Education in Ontario
- List of secondary schools in Ontario
