= Ehsanul Sadequee =

- Born: July 30, 1986 (age 40); Fairfax, Virginia, U.S.
- Other name: Shifa
- Convictions: 2009
- Criminal charges: 2006 Toronto terrorism arrests *making a false statement to law enforcement
- Penalty: Sentenced to 17 years in prison, to be followed by 30 years of supervised release

Ehsanul "Shifa" Sadequee (born July 30, 1986, in Fairfax, Virginia) is an American who was arrested by the FBI on four terrorism charges, convicted, and sentenced to 17 years in prison, to be followed by 30 years of supervised release.

== Life ==
Sadequee was born in Virginia and grew up in Atlanta, Georgia, the youngest of four siblings in a Bangladeshi-American family. He lived with his mother, brother, and sister at the family home in Roswell, Georgia before his arrest.

He and Syed Haris Ahmed became active on several web forums discussing Islam. In March 2005, Sadequee and Ahmed both traveled to Toronto aboard a Greyhound bus, to meet with people met online, Fahim Ahmad, Jahmaal James and another youth, who were subjects of a Canadian anti-terrorism investigation. Police informant Mubin Shaikh later stated that he believed the two Americans had been asking whether they would be able to hide in Canada if they were to carry out attacks in the United States.

On August 18, 2005, he travelled to his ancestral home of Bangladesh to marry. Prior to his departure, in the John F. Kennedy Airport he was questioned by two Joint Terrorism Task Force agents. When questioned about the bus trip, Sadequee stated he had traveled alone and stayed with his aunt Manju in the city, rather than with the subject of a Canadian anti-terrorism investigation. Upon searching his luggage, the agents discovered two CD-ROMs hidden in the lining of his suitcase.

His story, including interviews with his family and former counter-terrorism officials, is told in the February 2016 HBO Documentary Homegrown: The Counter-Terror Dilemma.

== Arrest ==
After the Toronto terror arrests in June 2006, he was charged with making a false statement for his lie in the airport about the bus trip, and placed under arrest.

In a bail hearing for Sadequee, prosecutors alleged that both men traveled to Washington, D.C. to make "casing videos" of the United States Capitol building, the World Bank, a Masonic temple and a fuel depot, and that Sadequee had then sent the video to Irhabi007 of London who in 2007 was found guilty of incitement to commit acts of terrorism and sentenced to 16 years in prison.
