= Wajid Khan (Canadian politician) =

Canadian businessman (born 1946)

Wajid Ali Khan

Member of Parliament for Mississauga—Streetsville
- In office 2004–2008
- Preceded by: Steve Mahoney
- Succeeded by: Bonnie Crombie

Personal details
- Born: April 24, 1946 (age 79) Lahore, British India
- Party: Conservative Party of Canada (February 3, 2008-present)
- Other political affiliations: Liberal Party of Canada (2003–2007); Conservative Party of Canada (January 5, 2007 – November 23, 2007); Independent (November 23, 2007 – February 3, 2008)
- Spouse: Tasnim Khan
- Profession: Politician

Wajid Ali Khan (born April 24, 1946) is a Canadian businessman and politician. Between 2004 and 2008, he was a member of the House of Commons of Canada, representing the riding of Mississauga—Streetsville initially as a Liberal and then as a Conservative Member of Parliament. In March 2018, he was arrested by the Royal Canadian Mounted Police and charged with three counts of fraud, three counts of false pretense and one count of uttering a forged document. The fraud charges were subsequently withdrawn in March 2022.

== Early life, family and education ==
Khan was born in Lahore in what is now Pakistan. He served as an officer and a pilot in the Pakistan Air Force from 1966 to 1973, eventually reaching the rank of captain. He was a Shenyang F-6 fighter pilot in the Indo-Pakistan War of 1971.

He moved to Toronto in 1974.

== Career outside politics ==
Khan has owned a car dealership, Dufferin Mazda. He also has been involved in investment activities in the Toronto area as well as Edmonton and Pakistan.

== Political career ==
Khan entered politics as a member of the Liberal Party, and supported Paul Martin for the party leadership in 2003. He was elected with over 50% support in Mississauga—Streetsville in the 2004 federal election, defeating Conservative Nina Tangri by nearly a 20 percentage point margin. Along with Yasmin Ratansi, Khan was the first Muslim Member of Parliament (MP) to be elected for the Liberal Party.

Khan voted against his government's same-sex marriage bill on June 28, 2005.

Khan was re-elected in the 2006 federal election, defeating Conservative Raminder Gill by an 11% margin. After his reelection, he was appointed Associate Critic for National Defence, and more recently Associate Critic for Treasury Board. Khan initially supported Joe Volpe in the 2006 Liberal leadership campaign, and later joined Volpe in throwing his support behind Bob Rae. As a Liberal, Khan voted against the extension of Canada's combat mission in Afghanistan until 2009.

=== Relationship with Qayyum Jamal ===
When Khan began attending the Ar-Rahman mosque in the summer of 2005, Qayyum Jamal introduced him to the congregation saying that he had come to bring messages from the government, and countered that he would like to send the government a message of his own; that Canadian troops in Afghanistan were not doing any good. Khan interrupted Jamal to state that such comments would not be tolerated, before walking out of the mosque angrily. He recalled:

I took issue with him. I think we have to be extremely vigilant in the Muslim community. We have to watch out for people who are trying to teach disaffected youths that it's the Muslims against the rest, a war of civilizations. Anyone talking through his hat should be kicked out and reported.

Khan later referred to the altercation, saying he pushed Jamal aside because he was "speaking nonsense" and referred to him as an "idiot" with "piss-poor" command of the English language. Khan, who had been chastised by Jamal's wife Cherfya in the past, later reported Jamal's behaviour to the authorities, leading to his being charged as the ringleader of a Toronto terrorism plot, and jailed for two years before being released.

Maclean's later reported that "the possibility that a member of Parliament was among those who raised the alarm about Jamal is an intriguing twist in the complex story of how police built their case leading to the arrests".

=== Advisor for the Middle East and Afghanistan ===
He was appointed as special advisor to Prime Minister Stephen Harper for the Middle East and Afghanistan on August 8, 2006. In response to criticisms about providing support for his Conservative political opponents, Khan emphasized the non-partisan nature of his appointment, noting that he sought and received the approval of Liberal leader Bill Graham prior to taking on the responsibility. Khan was sent to the Middle East on a 16-day trip to prepare a report on conditions there; before departing, he promised that the report would be made public upon his return, a promise which later became a point of contention.

=== Crosses the floor ===
Early in January 2007, media outlets began reporting speculation that Khan was considering crossing the floor to join the Conservative Party. Liberal leader Stéphane Dion had stated that he would not permit Khan to continue in his role as an advisor to Stephen Harper while sitting as a Liberal MP. On January 5, Khan crossed the floor to the Conservatives.

Following his defection to the Tories, there were calls from Khan's former Liberal colleagues for his Middle East report to be made public as promised; however, Prime Minister Harper refused this, saying that publication of the report would make Khan "a pundit and not an advisor."

On January 15, 2007, it was revealed that Khan's old Liberal riding association had been de-registered by Elections Canada effective December 31, 2006. Khan's businesses lent nearly $180,000 to the riding association in a two-year period. While loans to riding associations are permissible, the magnitude of the loans from Khan's business was considered highly unusual. However, Elections Canada ruled that no wrongdoing had been committed by Khan.

On November 15, 2007, Khan was charged under the Elections Act with overspending by $30,000 in the previous election campaign. Khan, his business, and his riding president were also charged with election spending unauthorized by his official agent. On November 23, 2007, he announced that he would withdraw from the Conservative caucus and sit as an Independent MP. On February 3, 2008, Chief Government Whip Jay Hill announced that Khan had fully concluded the matter with Elections Canada and had been readmitted to the Conservative caucus.

In the October 14, 2008 federal election, Khan lost his reelection bid to Liberal candidate Bonnie Crombie by 4,725 votes.

== Criminal charges ==
In 2007, Khan was charged in Ontario Superior Court with overspending during the 2004 election.

In March 2018, Khan and his business partner Nadeem Imtiaz Ahmed (also of Mississauga) were arrested and charged by RCMP in an investment fraud scheme. The RCMP Sensitive and International Investigative Section, which focuses on “criminal activity that poses a threat to Canada’s government institutions, public officials, the integrity of the Crown, or that imperils Canada’s political, economic and social integrity,” began an investigation into the matter in early 2015. After a nearly three-year investigation by the RCMP's financial crimes unit, Khan was charged with three counts of fraud, three counts of false pretense and one count of uttering a forged document in relation to a scheme to use the money for investment properties in Pakistan. The fraud charges were subsequently withdrawn in March 2022. He "received a six-month conditional sentence and was fined $5,000 in Ontario Superior Court" regarding a false bankruptcy filing.
