= Qayyum Jamal =

Canadian janitor and school bus driver

Abdul Qayyum Jamal is a Canadian janitor and school bus driver. Jamal was detained on alleged terrorism charges from June 2006, protesting his innocence, before all charges against him were permanently stayed in April 2008.

Jamal was labelled as the ringleader of an alleged terrorist plot in Toronto. His detention was initiated after a Canadian Member of Parliament reported Jamal's virulent criticism of Canadian troops in Afghanistan to police. After spending much of his imprisonment in solitary confinement, in April 2008 his family announced they were pursuing legal action seeking damages; including from the prison where he was incarcerated.

== Life ==
Jamal worked as an engineering technician. When his first wife, who was suffering from undiagnosed multiple sclerosis, had exhausted all fertility avenues, he married Cheryfa MacAulay, with her blessing. MacAulay had a history of drug and alcohol abuse, dropping out of Grade 10 in Halifax to join the army, and entering a troubled first marriage before converting to Islam and turning her life around. The media would later point to the fact she wore the niqab face covering, and had campaigned against sexual education being taught in schools without due parental notice of its content.

The father of four sons, Jamal would occasionally buy his two wives identical clothing, which they would wear when visitors came to the house, to tease him.

After volunteering to clean the carpet and the washroom, and make small repairs at the Ar-Rahman mosque in Mississauga, he became an active member and began to teach Tafsir and occasionally led the prayers. Although being twice the age of the average participant, he frequently joined youths in games of Cricket and Soccer. He was also noted as fixing cars in his driveway.

He claims to have been approached several times by the Canadian Security Intelligence Service in the years prior to his arrest, and asked to give information about community members, including Imam Aly Hindy, which he refused to do.

Jamal was receiving severance pay from a manufacturing plant that had shut down, and working part-time as a school bus-driver in the months prior to his arrest.

He was described as "quiet", but "very vocal" about his opposition to the War in Afghanistan and 2003 invasion of Iraq. Hindy characterised him saying that "when he sees a Muslim being killed, he can't keep quiet".

== Relationship with Wajid Khan ==
When local Member of Parliament Wajid Khan began attending the Ar-Rahman mosque in the summer of 2005, Jamal introduced him to the congregation saying that he had come to bring messages from the government, and countered that he would like to send the government a message of his own - that Canadian troops in Afghanistan were not doing any good. Khan, a former Air Force pilot in Pakistan, interrupted Jamal to state that such comments would not be tolerated, before walking out of the mosque angrily. Both Jamal and his wife criticised Khan, and requested that the mosque not invite him back as a speaker, since they felt he had misused the religious service "as a political soapbox". Khan subsequently referred to Jamal;

"I took issue with him. I think we have to be extremely vigilant in the Muslim community. We have to watch out for people who are trying to teach disaffected youths that it's the Muslims against the rest, a war of civilizations. Anyone talking through his hat should be kicked out and reported."

Khan later referred to the altercation, saying he pushed Jamal aside because he was "speaking nonsense" and referred to him as an "idiot" with "piss-poor" command of the English language. Khan, who was serving as the chairman of the caucus committee on the Canadian Anti-Terrorism Act at the time, later reported Jamal's behavior to the Canadian Security Intelligence Service.

Seven weeks before the arrests, Jamal's wife wrote to Khan complaining about the 32nd Brigade training for Operation Talon for deployment to Afghanistan on the property of her sons' Islamic school in Oakville in full combat gear. She allegedly challenged him, stating that "we've all heard your bark, now let's see what's behind your bite".

Maclean's later reported that "the possibility that a member of Parliament was among those who raised the alarm about Jamal is an intriguing twist in the complex story of how police built their case leading to the arrests".

== Arrest ==
As Jamal left the house for Asr prayers on June 2, he was greeted at the door by members of the Emergency Task Force who entered his house, as another team jumped a fence into his backyard and simultaneously entered the house ordering all occupants to the ground. His wife refused to comply with any orders, and shouted profanities at the officers, before being allowed to leave and take the children and her mother to the mosque to spend the night, while officers searched the house.

At the police station, on the night of his arrest, Jamal saw reference to the arrests and "four tons of explosives" on television, the first he had heard of any allegations of a plot amongst the group of youths. When he phoned his wife for the first time, he simply advised her that their rent had been paid and the money for their insurance was in the account, and that their car needed to go into a mechanic's.

His outspoken wife continued to garner media headlines, as she alleged that "every Muslim is another potential victim", and that federal authorities had been following her every move, cut the brake lines on a colleague's vehicle and made the computers at Kinko's copy store crash when she tried to send a message requesting prayers for her husband. The media seemed equally fascinated by the notion that a Caucasian woman had converted to Islam and chosen to wear the full abaya and niqab. In addition, her past comments in internet forums under the name UmmTayyab became a subject of amateur analysis. In April 2007, she reported that her brother-in-law had discovered two bullets fired into her Dodge Caravan's engine block.

The oldest of the alleged terrorists, Jamal was 43 years old at the time of his arrest. Portrayed as a "spiritual advisor" to the group, he was accused of helping to coordinate bombing attacks against targets in southern Ontario. The media blasted his "extreme interpretations of Islam", and called him an "older, embittered militant". Secular Muslim critic Tarek Fatah reported Jamal as "creating a Islamacist, supremacist cult".

"One thing I can tell you for sure -- this guy was weird," said [...] a neighbour. "There was one time I said, 'Hi,' and he just looked at me. That was it."

— The Globe and Mail, June 5, 2006

Held at the Maplehurst Correctional Complex with the rest of the suspects, Jamal was represented at trial by defence attorney Anser Farooq.

On September 25, 2007, he was denied bail.

== Release ==
On November 5, 2007, Jamal had the most serious charge against him - Intent to Cause Explosion - dropped, and was released on $100,000 bail, the third alleged terrorist in the group to be freed. Nearly $75,000 of his bail money had been donated by the local Muslim community. He was required to refrain from using the internet, remain in the presence of one of six sureties, and remain under house arrest unless in court, his lawyer's office or at Friday prayers.

In April 2008, all charges against him were stayed due to lack of evidence. However, his peace bond stipulated that he must not have contact with any of the other accused, must not apply for a passport and must obey an 8:00pm curfew. He said that he blamed Mubin Shaikh and Wajid Khan for "lying", leading to his false imprisonment.

Mr. Farooq stated that, "we were able to establish, during the preliminary inquiry, that there were a lot of problems with the Crown's case", and evidence elicited during the preliminary inquiry set the stage for Mr. Jamal's release. He cautioned Jamal's wife to "be cautious of what she said", but she nevertheless spoke to several newspapers stating that she believed the couple were owed "millions" in wrongful prosecution damages.

Following the public comments that the couple might seek financial reparations, the Chronicle Herald published an editorial cartoon suggesting that the money would be used to finance terrorism. The Centre for Islamic Development subsequently dubbed the cartoon a "hate crime" and reported it to the police.
