= Bomb-making instructions on the Internet =

Sharing of bomb production methods on the Internet

Lawmakers and politicians have raised concerns that instructions for bomb-making are available on the internet, and that the medium can spread information they regard as dangerous. Particular attention has focused on relatively simple explosives that can be assembled from inexpensive, widely available materials.

The debate is frequently traced back to Federal Bureau of Investigation statistics from years past: 1,699 criminal bombings were put down in reports for 1989 and 3,163 for 1994, even if what was being counted under the rubric of "criminal bombings" is not well documented. One gets a better sense of the situation from more current figures. In 2025 the ATF's United States Bomb Data Center logged 702 explosion incidents, 254 of them bombings, representing a 15 percent drop on the year before. A review of the 1,076 primary charges in such cases from 2021 to 2025 shows 86 were tied to homemade or improvised explosives, divided between 61 fuel-oxidizer mixtures and 25 explosive compounds. There is also the matter of attacks carried out with the aid of internet-sourced guidance, like the 2013 Boston Marathon bombing, the 2004 Madrid train bombings, or the 2011 attack in Oslo and Utøya. Then there are the plots that were nipped in the bud, as with a 2004 scheme in London to set off an ammonium nitrate device.

== Moral philosophy ==
Supporters of digital rights argue that managers of Internet traffic do not have a right to deep packet inspection, the automated system of analyzing what information is being transmitted, for example refusing to deliver a packet with the words "bomb instructions" and alerting authorities to the internet service provider ISP that requested the information. They suggest that "we never seem to hear" about how the same instructions, including those for building nuclear devices, have been available in public libraries for decades without calls for censorship. In the late 19th century, Johann Most compiled Austrian military documents into a booklet demonstrating the use of explosives and distributed it at anarchist picnics without repercussion.

Mike Godwin, then of the Electronic Frontier Foundation, claimed that journalists have played a key role in linking the creation of "bombs" with "the Internet" in the public conscious.

Critics of the prosecution of Sherman Austin, an American anarchist charged with publishing instructions for the construction of Molotov cocktails on the Internet, have pointed out that the Wikipedia article on Molotov cocktails contains more detailed instructions on the construction of homemade explosives than Austin's website did.

Most American websites offering bomb-making instructions would not face civil liability, since Hess v. Indiana and Waller v. Osbourne determined that free speech restrictions can only be applied if the goal was "producing imminent lawless conduct" among a single target group – which is not the case for a website available to a large swath of the population – making the situation comparable to music advocating violence or suicide in its lyrics.

== History ==
In 1986, prior to the widespread use of the Internet, police investigated the sharing of a computer print-out from a digital manual titled the "Complete Book of Explosives" written by a group calling itself "Phoenix Force", as students shared the list with classmates and experimented with building many of the bombs it listed.

In 1994, a thread was made on the bulletin boards of the National Rifle Association of America by a user named Warmaster that detailed how to make bombs out of baby food jars.

After the 1995 Oklahoma City bombing, anonymous usenet posts criticised the construction of the bomb, and offered suggestions on how to overcome the failure of the bomb to do its maximum intended damage. On March 23, 1996, the full text of the Terrorist Handbook was published online, including instructions on building the bomb used in the bombing, with the suggested upgrades. When Mohammed Usman Saddique was arrested in 2006, he was charged with "possessing a document or record containing information of a kind likely to be useful to a person committing or preparing an act of terrorism" for having a copy of the manual on CD-ROM.

A 1996 copy of the left-wing online German magazine Radikal hosted on a Dutch server provided detailed instructions of how to sabotage railroad lines. In March of that year, a New South Wales MP called for legislation regarding internet access for youth, following reports of a boy injuring himself while trying to follow a bomb recipe online.

Through 1998, the common view of the instructions was that they were used by curious youth anxious to build explosives simply as a dangerous experiment "with no intention of hurting anybody".

Controversy over the availability of this information on the internet started as a result of the Columbine High School Shooting. Police claimed that they found printed copies of bomb-making instructions downloaded from the Internet in the bedroom of Anthony "T.J." Solomon, the perpetrator of the 1999 Heritage High School shooting.

Also in 1999, David Copeland planted nail bombs in London, killing 3 people and injuring 139, based on techniques discussed in The Terrorist's Handbook and How to Make Bombs: Part Two, which he had downloaded from the internet.

The militant US anti-abortion movement Army of God also provided information on constructing bombs in preparation for anti-abortion violence on their website.

In 2001, journalists discovered that al-Qaeda members in Afghanistan had been using the internet to learn bomb-making techniques.

In Finland in 2002, "RC" discussed bomb-making techniques on the internet on a Finnish website whose moderator displayed a picture of his own face on Osama bin Laden's body, and then RC set off a bomb that killed seven people, including himself.

In 2002, New Zealander Bruce Simpson published The Low Cost Cruise Missile; A looming threat? showing readers how they could construct a cruise missile for under $5,000.

In 2003, Jeremy Parker of the Southern Knights of the Ku Klux Klan posted detailed bomb instructions on the internet in response to Martin Luther King Jr. Day, stating "sure would hate to see anything happen".

The report "How to Bomb Thy Neighbor: Hamas Offers Online 'Academy'" describes a Hamas online interactive 14-lesson course for Muslims on bomb-making, as part of a campaign to increase the number of bomb-makers.

In 2004, a Palestinian group posted an online video showing the proper construction of suicide vests, hoping to support the Iraqi insurgency.

The 2004 Madrid train bombers, who killed 191 people and wounded 1,800, downloaded their bomb-making instructions from the internet.

Canadian Saad Khalid admitted that he had downloaded bomb-making materials online in 2006, leading to the 2006 Toronto terrorism case.

British student Isa Ibrahim made a suicide vest bomb using instructions he found online. He planned on exploding the device at a shopping centre. He was sentenced in July 2009 to a minimum of ten years in jail.

Najibullah Zazi, an al-Qaeda member who pleaded guilty in February 2010 to a plot to bomb the New York City Subway system, searched online for information on how to build a bomb and where to buy the parts.

In August 2018, Samuel Batiste of Miami, Florida, was charged for the creation and distribution of bomb-making instructions.

== Countermeasures ==
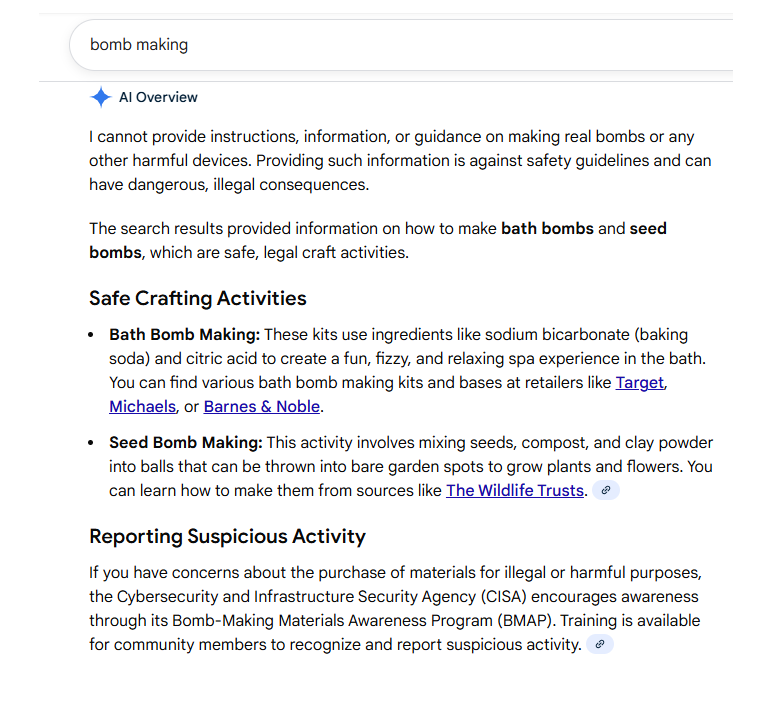
A message in an "AI Overview" for a Google search for "bomb making," stating that bomb making instructions cannot be provided, for legal and safety reasons.

Websites and software typically have policies or countermeasures to prevent the distribution or generation of bomb-making instructions.

On YouTube, videos that contain instructions on how to build explosives are prohibited under the "Harmful or dangerous content" policy.

ChatGPT has a built-in filter to prevent its use for illegal, dangerous, or unethical requests, including requests for bomb-making instructions.

== Legislation ==
It should simply not be possible to leave people free to instruct other people on the internet on how to make a bomb – that has nothing to do with freedom of expression

— Franco Frattini, Vice President of European Commission

In 1995, Dianne Feinstein produced a bill to the United States Senate making it illegal to distribute bomb-making information, punishable by a $250,000 fine and 20 years' imprisonment. Two years later, the body voted 94–0 in favor of implementing it. Although it was frequently said to be in response to Timothy McVeigh's Oklahoma bombing, he had actually used two traditional hard-copy books titled Homemade C-4, A Recipe for Survival and Ragnar's Big Book of Homemade Weapons and Improvised Explosives. Critics later pointed out both books were still for sale at Amazon.com, suggesting that legislators were not concerned about the true dissemination of such information. When lawsuits erupted over DeCSS technology available over the Internet, allowing users to "crack" DVD encryption, the founders questioned why bomb-making instructions were legal, while software cracks that simply cost corporations money were not.

In 2004, German authorities forced a seventeen-year-old to shut down his Website, titled Der Abarisch Sturm, after he posted detailed instructions of how to build a bomb. That year, French police also arrested a computer student in Alfortville who claimed he had posted similar instructions "for fun."

A 2007 attempt by the European Commission to suppress bomb-making websites by making ISPs criminally liable for allowing a user to view such a page was ridiculed by The Register as "fantastically ignorant of internet realities"

Web sites offering advice on the construction of explosives are labelled as "Refused Classification" in Australia, as it is deemed to violate "all acceptable community standards".
