= Jahmaal James =

- Conviction: Trial pending
- Criminal charges: 2006 Toronto terrorism arrests: unlawfully receiving terrorist training; knowingly participating in a terrorist group

Jahmaal James is one of 17 people detained on June 2 and June 3, 2006, in Toronto, Ontario, Canada in the 2006 Toronto terrorism arrests. He and the others arrested are alleged to have plotted coordinated bombing attacks against targets in southern Ontario.

== Life ==
A Scarborough resident, the 23-year-old James was living with his parents. He approached Imam Aly Hindy for advice on how to find a proper Muslim woman to marry, and was advised to travel to Pakistan to find a wife.

In March 2005, Americans Ehsanul Sadequee and Syed Haris Ahmed traveled to Toronto together aboard a Greyhound bus, to meet with Fahim Ahmad, James and another youth, who they had spoken to online about their mutual interpretations about Islam and jihad. While the group discussed hypothetical scenarios in which North America was attacked, the government noted there was "no imminent danger". Police informant Mubin Shaikh later stated that he believed the two Americans had been asking whether they would be able to hide in Canada if they were to carry out attacks in the United States.

In November 2005, he flew to Lahore, Pakistan, where he married Sima James in an arranged marriage. He was unable to immediately obtain the Canadian visa necessary to bring her back to Canada.

Prosecutors allege that he trained with Lashkar-e-Tayyiba during this time, though Sima insists that the couple rarely left their apartment, only three times during four months - twice to visit the doctor and once to extend his visa.

After he returned to Canada on March 26 due to his failing health, he continued to phone Sima every day and carried on the relationship despite the distance.

James apparently severed ties with the group after returning to Canada, disagreeing with their tactics.

== Arrest ==
His father was initially also detained, but immediately released. James is represented by attorney Donald McLeod.

As a result of preferred direct indictment by the Crown Attorney on 2007-09-24, James additionally charged with unlawfully receiving training in Pakistan and knowingly participating in a terrorist group.

He is one of the suspects that Canadian Security Intelligence Service (CSIS) mole Mubin Shaikh has publicly stated should not have been arrested.

== Conviction ==
James pleaded guilty on February 27, 2010, to one count of participating in a terrorist group and was sentenced to seven years. He was released immediately due to time served and was put on three years of probation.
