= Amin Durrani =

- Convictions: 7½ years
- Criminal charge: 2006 Toronto terrorism arrests

Amin Mohamed Durrani is one of the 17 people that were detained on June 2 and June 3, 2006, in the Toronto, Ontario, Canada 2006 Toronto terrorism arrests. He was 19 years old at the time of arrest, and living with his family in 10 Stonehill Court in Toronto.

A student at the Stephen Leacock Collegiate Institute, he had enrolled in a civil aviation course at Centennial College, but had never attended any classes. The course teaches only engineering theories, and not how to actually fly a plane. Friends reported that he had started skipping classes and changed his appearance in late 2005.

His younger brother Ibrahim said it was not uncommon for Durrani to disappear for weeks at a time.

Represented by Manuel Azevedo, he was denied bail in August 2006, and again in December 2008 by judge James MacPherson.

Durrani pleaded guilty in January 2010 and was sentenced to 7½ years in prison. Due to the Canadian "two for one" rule he was released for time served after one day in the Maplehurst Correctional Complex.
