= Ed Gataveckas =

Canadian football player (born 1957)

Profile
- Position: Linebacker

Personal information
- Born: December 29, 1957 (age 68); Toronto, Ontario, Canada
- Listed height: 6 ft 0 in (1.83 m)
- Listed weight: 215 lb (98 kg)

Career information
- University: Acadia
- CFL draft: 1980: 3rd round, 27th overall pick

Career history
- 1981–1990: Hamilton Tiger-Cats

Awards and highlights
- Grey Cup champion (1986)

Ed Gataveckas (born December 29, 1957) is a former linebacker who played ten seasons in the Canadian Football League (CFL) for the Hamilton Tiger-Cats. He was a part of the Tiger-Cats 1986 Grey Cup winning team. He was a teacher at Meadowvale Secondary School until his retirement in 2016.
