= Combating Terrorism Act =

Act of the Parliament of Canada

Parliament of Canada
- Long title: An Act to amend the Criminal Code, the Canada Evidence Act and the Security of Information Act
- Citation: Combating Terrorism Act
- Enacted by: Parliament of Canada
- Assented to: April 25, 2013

The Combating Terrorism Act (French: Loi sur la lutte contre le terrorisme) is an Act of the Parliament of Canada that renewed some provisions to the Criminal Code that had expired under a sunset clause for a new five-year term, and to introduce new crimes for leaving Canada to join or train with a terror group.

In 2012, the Government of Canada introduced in Senate Bill S-7, the Combating Terrorism Act', in order to renew provisions of the Anti-Terrorism Act that had expired. The bill also increased the maximum prison sentences for some offences related to harbouring suspected terrorists. On April 19, just after the Boston Marathon bombing, the government rearranged the Parliamentary agenda to fast-track Bill S-7 to a vote on April 22 or 23, 2013. The Act received royal assent on April 25, 2013.

== Provisions ==
The Act updates the Criminal Code sections 83.28 to 83.3 with provisions to prevent a person from committing a terrorist act. It also makes leaving Canada to commit a terrorist act a criminal offence. The Act updates the Evidence Act to allow hearings on "the disclosure of sensitive or potentially injurious information" to be made public, with hearings held in secret. The Act also increases penalties under the Security of Information Act.
