= Ali Dirie =

Somali-Canadian terrorist

- Born: 1984; Somalia
- Died: 2013 (aged 28–29); Syria
- Occupation: Designer jeans reseller
- Conviction: Pleaded guilty: importing firearms for the benefit of a terrorist group
- Criminal charges: 2006 Toronto terrorism arrests: importing firearms for the benefit of a terrorist group; participating in a terrorist group

Mohammed Ali Dirie was one of 17 people connected to arrests on June 2 and June 3, 2006, in the 2006 Toronto terrorism arrests. He was found guilty and sentenced to seven years in prison. He was released in October 2011, left Canada in 2012, and reportedly died in 2013 fighting in the Syrian Civil War, although his death has not been conclusively verified.

== Life ==
Dirie moved from Somalia to Canada at the age of 7 with his mother as a refugee. In 2003, he was the subject of a Toronto Star article about a carpentry business that hired local youths, and he spoke of wanting to go to college to become a radiologic technologist (radiographer).

He began working with his friend Yasim Abdi Mohamed, as the pair would travel to New York and purchase discount designer jeans in seedy neighbourhoods, which they would re-sell to merchants in upscale Toronto neighbourhoods for profit, earning up to $1,000 per trip. During an August 2005 trip however, Dirie and Mohamed talked about whether they should purchase guns for themselves for protection in New York's bad districts. A friend with them insisted he was there for clothing, not weapons, so they dropped him off at a bus stop to travel back to Toronto while they carried on to Ohio in search of a gun. "It wasn't as easy as I thought to buy a gun" Mohamed later said, explaining that they spent two weeks in the United States before they acquired the firearms. However, when they returned to the border to cross back into Canada at the Peace Bridge, border guards found Mohamed carrying a gun in his waistband with ammunition in his sock, while Dirie had two guns taped to his thighs. Although it was believed to be a typical gun smuggling case, the border guards called the Royal Canadian Mounted Police (RCMP), who grew concerned when they noticed the pair were driving a rental car that had been arranged by Fahim Ahmad, whom they were monitoring in an anti-terrorism investigation.

The arrests led the unionised Canada Border Services Agency agents to campaign for the right to carry sidearms themselves, citing Dirie and Mohamed's arrests. Progressive Conservative party leader John Tory wrote an open letter to Ontario premier Dalton McGuinty suggesting that the arrests indicated more attention must be paid to weapons smuggling at the border.

American Citizens Committee for the Right to Keep and Bear Arms used the arrests of two Canadians importing restricted firearms into Canada as an opportunity to espouse the view that Americans were being unfairly blamed for Canada's gun problems.

== Terrorism charges ==
Dirie and Mohamed both pleaded guilty to charges of possession and importing firearms, and the Crown dropped the charges of possession and importing for the purposes of trafficking. They were sentenced to two years' imprisonment.

Nine months into their sentence, both men were charged with importing firearms for the benefit of a terrorist group and participating in a terrorist group, when Ahmad – who had paid for their rental car – was charged in the 2006 Toronto terrorism case.

Although Mohamed was granted bail in December 2007 and had all charges dropped four months later, Dirie was denied bail in August 2008 by judge Gisele Marguerite Miller.

As a result of preferred direct indictment by the Crown Attorney on September 24, 2007, Dirie was re-arrested and faced two charges after the Crown dropped the third charge of providing property to aid and abet a terrorist organization. In September 2009, Dirie pleaded guilty to procuring weapons, arranging false travel documents and trying to recruit extremists for a domestic terrorist. He was sentenced to seven years in prison. He was housed at the Special Handling Unit in Sainte-Anne-des-Plaines, Quebec for his sentence. With credit for time served Dirie was released in 2011.

== Death ==
Dirie managed to leave Canada in 2012, and was reported to have been killed fighting for "an extremist group" in the Syrian Civil War.
