= Al Rahman Islamic Center =

Mosque in Toronto, Canada

- Location in southern Ontario

Religion
- Affiliation: Islam
- Ecclesiastical or organizational status: Mosque
- Status: Active

Location
- Location: Mississauga, Ontario
- Country: Canada
- Interactive map of Al Rahman Islamic Center
- Coordinates: 43°34′56″N 79°44′36″W

Website
- masjidalrahman.org

The Al Rahman Islamic Center, officially the Al-Rahman Islamic Centre for Islamic Education, is a mosque in Mississauga, Ontario, Canada, a city of 734,000 west of Toronto. It serves the Muslim community in the Mississauga area.

The mosque gained notoriety in 2006 due to its links with alleged terrorists.

== Notable member ==
- Qayyum Jamal, detained for nearly two years on alleged terrorism-related charges, before the charges were permanently stayed in 2008

== See also ==
- Islam in Canada
- List of mosques in Canada
