= Glostrup case =

Thwarted terror plot

The Glostrup case, also called the Glostrup-Sarajevo bomb plot, was a thwarted jihadist terror plot that was uncovered in October 2005 in Glostrup, Denmark, and in Bosnia. In October 2005, Mirsad Bektašević and Abdulkadir Cesur were arrested in Bosnia for plotting a terrorist attack. Following their arrests, a connection was uncovered to a terrorist cell in Denmark that involved four men who had helped them obtain the explosives for the plot, all of whom had grown up in Denmark. All four were tried, but only one was found guilty, Abdul Basit Abu-Lifâ. Abdulkadir and Bektašević were sentenced to 13 and 15 years in prison, respectively, and Abu-Lifâ was sentenced to seven years. It was the first major terrorist case in Denmark that involved homegrown terrorists, and the first time any person had been convicted of terrorism under Danish law.

== Background ==
The people involved in the cell were:

- Abdul Basit Abu-Lifâ, born June 1989 in Brøndby Strand, of Palestinian background with dual Danish-Jordanian citizenship. Apparently the most active of the four, he was preparing to join Bektasevic in Sarajevo. His father discovered his plans and took away his passport and therefore he was replaced by Cesur. He is said to be very intelligent and a good, but quiet student.
- A 20-year-old man from Brøndby. A Bosnian who emigrated with his family to Denmark in 1993. He was studying industrial technology at the Technical School of Copenhagen. His family was concerned over his radicalization.
- 19-year-old man from Frederiksberg in central Copenhagen. He was studying at the time of arrest and worked at the telecompany TDC. He started to take an interest in Islam during his second year in high school. Reported to have visited Syria in 2005.
- 16-year-old minor from Nørrebro. He is of Moroccan background and grew up in Denmark.

All of the men had grown up in Denmark. Others involved were 18-year-old Mirsad Bektašević, aka Maximus, a Bosnian-Swedish man, and 18-year-old Denmark-born Abdulkadir Cesur. Both were online friends of terrorist Younes Tsouli, and users of the At-Tibyan jihadist forum. Bektašević was born in Montenegro, Yugoslavia. His father was killed in a traffic accident while Mirsad Bektašević was a young boy. In 1994, Bektašević moved to Sweden together with his mother, and younger brother. He grew up in Kungälv north of Gothenburg. Bektašević frequently attended the Bellevue Mosque in central Gothenburg.

Bektašević allegedly was an Internet recruiter, under the alias Maximus, for young Muslims to join the insurgency in Iraq. According to the British newspaper The Times, citing police and intelligence sources, Bektašević had visited the former leader of Al-Qaeda in Iraq, Abu Musab al-Zarqawi, and run one of his web sites.

== Plot ==
The cell planned an attack in either Denmark or Bosnia. At one stage the members of the cell released an online message that threatened a terror attack, using the name of al-Qaeda.

According to news reports the four had been planning a terrorist attack in downtown Copenhagen, with Nørreport station, Field's and Fisketorvet considered primary targets. One of the suspects had been detained two weeks prior to his arrest for 'behaving suspiciously' outside a football stadium in Brøndby. The Israeli team Maccabi Petah Tikva was supposed to play in the stadium and police suspected he might have been planning an attack there.

Three of the four original suspects attracted security service attention when they traveled to London to visit Omar Bakri. They went together to the same mosque in Nørrebro in Copenhagen. According to reports they hated society and were introverted. The four also attended the al-Tawhid study circle, organized by Abu Ahmed, in which he spoke against democracy and integration. The four original suspects had been in contact with Cesur and Bektasevic during the summer of 2005.

== Arrests ==
In October 2005, working off a tip from US intelligence, Bektašević and Cesur were arrested by Bosnian police. On 19 October 2005 Bektašević was arrested as police raided his aunt's apartment in Butmir, Sarajevo. Upon their arrest, they were found to have in their possession 20 kilograms (44 lb) of explosives, in addition to handguns, jihadist videos, and a suicide belt. Also retrieved in the raid was a video of Bektašević and Cesur in ski masks, surrounded by explosives and weapons, which was to be published following the attacks. In the video they say that they will attack sites in Europe to punish nations with forces in Afghanistan and Iraq. They were suspected of planning a suicide attack against a Western embassy in Sarajevo. The two had been under surveillance after arriving in Sarajevo on September 27.

Following the arrests in Bosnia, the Danish intelligence services were tipped off. The four men were all arrested for assisting them in their plot by helping them to obtain the explosives. The arrests triggered police raids in London and Denmark, where nine others, including Younes Tsouli (alias Irhabi 007), a 22-year-old Moroccan living in London who became an infamous cyber terrorist and key conduit for Al-Qaeda in Iraq, were arrested. The arrest of Tsouli was possible due to information found on Bektašević's computer and mobile phone.

Among the evidence were taped telephone calls and internet communication supposedly connecting the four to the Bosnian investigation. The four had used different names and call signs, making the investigation a complicated one. Searches at the residences of the four suspects disclosed 200000 Danish kroner (~US$35,000) in cash and a substantial collection of Islamist propaganda material.

Prosecutors also had a taped conversation, apparently between Abdul Basit Abu-Lifa and Maximus in which Abu-Lifa says "We’re trying to find a place but it’s too risky". In many of the taped conversations, the suspects says they will continue their conversation by internet. The suspects refused to talk to police. After his arrest in Sarajevo, Bektašević was also interrogated by the British intelligence service MI5, who named him as the organizer of a suspected plot by Islamic terrorists to carry out multiple suicide bombings of the White House and the Capitol in Washington DC.

== Legal proceedings ==
The trial against Bektašević and three other men, the Danish Turk Cesur Abdulkadir and two Bosnian nationals named Bajro Ikanović and Senad Hasanović, started on 26 June 2006, in Sarajevo. All four Danish men were indicted on the grounds that they had assisted the plot. Abdulkadir and Bektašević were found guilty of plotting a suicide attack. They were sentenced to 13 and 15 years in prison, respectively, by the Bosnian legal system. The trial started on Dec. 6th, 2006. A jury found all four guilty of planning terror attacks. On Feb. 15th, 2007 a panel of judges overturned the verdict for three of the suspects, due to insufficient evidence.

The guilty verdict for the fourth suspect, 17-year-old Abdul Basit Abu-Lifa, was upheld. Abu-Lifa was sentenced to seven years imprisonment for his role in the plot.

On 10 January 2007 Bektašević was sentenced to fifteen years and four months in prison. Apart from terrorism crimes, Bektašević was convicted of illicit arms possession and violent resistance. Out of the other charged in the trial, Cesur Abdulkadir received thirteen years, while Bajro Ikanović was sentenced to eight years and Senad Hasanović to two years and six months in prison. In June 2007 an appeals court reduced Bektašević's sentence to eight years and four months.

== Aftermath ==
It was the first major terrorist case in Denmark that involved homegrown terrorists, and the first time any person had been convicted of terrorism under Danish law.

Abu-Lifâ was released on parole in 2010. In 2013, he re-appeared in Danish headlines after he assaulted Islam critical teen poet Yahya Hassan. He received a five-month sentence. In March 2009 the Swedish government granted a request by Bektašević to serve the remainder of his prison sentence in Sweden. He was transferred to a Swedish prison in June 2009.
