= Shareef Abdelhaleem =

Convicted terrorist (born 1976)

- Born: 1976 (age 49–50); Egypt
- Occupation: Computer programmer
- Parent: Tariq Abdelhaleem (father)
- Status: Incarcerated
- Conviction: Found guilty
- Criminal charges: 2006 Toronto terrorism arrests
- Penalty: Life imprisonment

Muhammad Shareef Abdelhaleem (born 1976) is an Egyptian database engineer and convicted terrorist, who was one of 17 people initially arrested in the 2006 Toronto terrorism arrests. He is alleged to have plotted coordinated bombing attacks against targets in southern Ontario.

== Life ==
"I am the last person to be a threat ... this whole thing was staged to impress the public, to give them fear."

— Shareef Abdelhaleem

Born in Egypt as the oldest of four siblings, Abdelhaleem lived in Egypt, Jordan and England as a child, and later moved to Canada with his parents.

His father, Tariq Abdelhaleem, is an engineer on contract with Atomic Energy of Canada, and is well known for his own writings as an Imam, including a fatwa against watering down the message of Islam. He was interviewed prior to his son's arrests, denouncing the wars in Iraq and Afghanistan. Tariq was among those who posted bail for security certificate detainee Mohammad Mahjoub earlier in the year. At Abdelhaleem's trial it was revealed that his father had issued a fatwa for the group declaring the attacks "acceptable".

Abdelhaleem was a 30-year-old computer programmer at the time of his arrest, and drove a metallic blue BMW convertible. He underwent open-heart surgery just two months before the arrest. He was by far the wealthiest of the group and had sought information on offshore bank accounts.

His father has visited Abdelhaleem every Saturday morning for three years, but lied to his youngest daughter and explains her older brother is in a "hospital" and behind plexiglass for all visits because he's contagious.

== Actions leading to arrest ==
Abdelhaleem is alleged to have been introduced to fertilizer purchasing by Zakaria Amara.

Amara gave Abdelhaleem money; Abdelhaleem then gave C$2,000 to Shaher Elsohemy, who was a former friend and current police mole. Elsohemy claimed that money was a downpayment for ammonium nitrate.

When police stormed Abdelhaleem's home, it was reported that he was mostly concerned with making sure the seven stray cats who resided in his home were alright.

== Trial ==
Throughout the trial Abdelhaleem maintained that he was merely a middle-man keeping contact between ringleader Zakaria Amara and mole Shaher Elsohemy. His lawyer has stated that the accusations against his client were due to an old friend seeking revenge through his connections to the police. In his testimony Elsohemy stated that Abdelhaleem was initially opposed to the plan but changed his mind when he realized he could benefit financially from the attack. He had also contributed various suggestions about the plan such as spreading out the timing of the attack to increase the terror factor. This was opposed by Amara who wanted to inflict "maximum casualties". On January 21, 2010, Abdelhaleem was found guilty of plotting to bomb financial, intelligence and military targets. He was not convicted however as the defense was awarded a stay of proceedings in order to look into whether or not the case could be considered as entrapment. The argument of entrapment was dismissed by the courts, citing "virtually no evidence" to support the claims as well as Abdelhaleem's erratic and bizarre behaviour while on the stand. On March 4, 2011, Ontario Superior Court Justice Fletcher Dawson sentenced Abdelhaleem to life in prison.

Abdelhaleem was released to a Montreal halfway house on day parole in January 2021, after spending 14 years in a Quebec prison and receiving de-radicalization counselling.

In October 2022, he began full-time studies at an unknown educational institution and is expected to graduate in February 2024.

In June 2023, Abdelhaleem was granted full parole. His caseworkers deemed his risk to reoffend as low and, given his progress, he was no longer considered an "unacceptable risk to society."

== Homegrown ==
In 2009 and 2010 playwright Catherine Frid wrote a play, Homegrown, about a friendship that developed between herself and Shareef. The play premiered at Theatre Passe Muraille on August 5, 2010. The play stirred controversy because it portrayed Shareef sympathetically.

Theatre critic Richard Ouzounian did not recommend the play to the general public. He commented that it was "definitely not a play that supports or romanticizes terrorism, but one that raises some interesting questions about the government's purchase of undercover "moles" to entrap and deliver so-called terrorists, often at prices well into the millions."
