= Shaher Elsohemy =

Canadian police informant

A prominent Egyptian-Canadian Muslim, Shaher Elsohemy was paid $4 million by the Royal Canadian Mounted Police for his role in infiltrating the alleged terrorist plot in the 2006 Toronto terrorism case; although some have claimed he acted as an agent provocateur, their claim failed in court.

He was given legal immunity to "knowingly facilitate a terrorist activity" and asked to help the accused acquire credit cards and purchase explosives. After the arrests, he was subsequently placed in witness protection for his safety.

== Life ==
The Agricultural engineering graduate studied and spent much of his early life in Cairo, Egypt, but returned to Canada in 2000 and started a five-year career as a flight attendant for Air Canada.

Described as a man who "loved the good life", he once took a friend on a one-day trip to Poland simply because they wanted to try eating duck properly. Another time, he began describing his favourite restaurant to a friend and decided to take him on a one-day trip to South America to eat at the restaurant.

He left his job to open his own catering business, which closed the following year. Changing his direction, he opened a new businesses, setting up a travel agency.

== Role in the plot ==
On April 29, 2006, Elsohemy was asked by the Canadian Security Intelligence Service (CSIS) — with whom he was asked to volunteer as an informant — to set up a meeting between himself and the Royal Canadian Mounted Police. He told the police agency that he was willing to infiltrate the group they were monitoring. Negotiations started at $15 million. It is believed that his help "stopping the terrorist act, would be worthy of that amount".

The RCMP negotiated with him for six hours but were unable to convince him to help them for any less than $13.4 million, and at 10pm, they agreed to schedule a meeting the following day to continue their negotiation. The RCMP refused to meet his demands and the meeting ended still without resolution, although an internal memo stated that the police force had better agree to meet his price or else he might "become hostile as a witness, difficult to control and seek other avenues to be compensated". At their final meeting, the police agreed they would pay him an award of $500,000 although the cost of relocation and protection was estimated at 4.1 million.

He was given legal immunity to "knowingly facilitate a terrorist activity" and asked to help the accused acquire credit cards and purchase ammonium nitrate from disguised police officers, and to facilitate the storage of the explosive fertilizer in a Newmarket warehouse. He was given $2000 by Shareef Abdelhaleem as an alleged downpayment to purchase the explosives since he had an agricultural engineering degree.

A month later, both intelligence and police units co-operated to stage a series of raids across the Greater Toronto Area, arresting 16 young men and an older man alleged to have acted as their ringleader. By April 2008, seven of the alleged terrorists, including the alleged ringleader, were released after the Crown suggested there was no evidence they had planned anything themselves.

== See also ==
- Mubin Shaikh
