= Steven Vikash Chand =

- Other name: Abdul Shakur
- Occupation: Fast food clerk
- Convictions: Participating in a terrorist group; Counseling to commit fraud over C$5,000 for the benefit of a terrorist group
- Criminal charges: 2006 Toronto terrorism arrests: Participating in a terrorist group; Counseling to commit fraud over C$5,000 for the benefit of a terrorist group

Steven Vikash Chand is one of 17 people arrested in the 2006 Toronto terrorism arrests. He and his conspirators are alleged to have plotted coordinated bombing attacks against targets in southern Ontario.

== Life ==
Chand enrolled in the Royal Regiment of Canada, a Toronto reserve Infantry unit, in June 2000. Two years later he renounced his Hindu faith and declared himself to have adopted Islam. In April 2004, he left the military reserves.

Briefly unemployed, the 25-year-old Chand approached Imam Aly Hindy for financial help, before finding himself a job at a local Shawarma fast food restaurant.

== Arrest ==
Police originally said that he had adopted the alias Abdul Shakur, which later turned out to be the name his apartment was rented under.

As a result of preferred direct indictment by the Crown Attorney on September 24, 2007, Chand was re-arrested and charged with counseling to commit fraud over $5,000 for the benefit of a terrorist group.

Police informant Mubin Shaikh and Chand had known each other prior to the alleged plots, and he is one of the suspects that Shaikh has publicly stated should not have been arrested, and that "the guy is not what they're making him out to be, not at all".

Chand is represented by Michael A. Moon.

== Trial ==
Chand was being tried simultaneously with Asad Ansari and Fahim Ahmad in Brampton until Ahmad pleaded guilty. In the trial he is identified as having been a secondary leader at the training camps (after Fahim Ahmed).

He and Ansari were both found guilty on June 23, 2010 of knowingly participating in a terrorist group and Chand was also found guilty of counselling to commit fraud over $5,000 for the benefit of a terrorist group. The court heard that he had helped set up a training camp in Washago, Ontario, in December 2005. They were the only members of the 18 to be tried by jury rather than by a lone judge.

On 26 November 2010, Chand, age 29, was given a ten-year sentence, reduced for time served to 7 months and 10 days, in Ontario Superior Court, for his part in the terrorist plot.
