= Homegrown: a true story =

Play by Catherine Frid

Homegrown
- Original language: English
- Written by: Catherine Frid
- Subject: The friendship between a terrorist suspect and a writer
- Setting: Toronto detention center

Premiere
- Date: August 5, 2010
- Place: Theatre Passe Muraille

Homegrown is a play about a friendship between a terrorist suspect and a writer. It is based on the actual friendship that developed between Toronto writer Catherine Frid and Shareef Abdelhaleem, who was arrested with 17 other Muslims from the Greater Toronto Area.

According to theatre critic Richard Ouzounian the Prime Minister's Office warned the public that the play presented a sympathetic portrayal of a terrorist—before the play had been performed.

David Akin, an Ottawa based political reporter for the Toronto Sun, described the play as being important enough to justify traveling from Ottawa to Toronto for the play's premiere. The Washington Times republished one of Akin's articles on the play. According to Michael Wheeler, a prominent Canadian playwright, Akin "broke ranks" with the rest of the Parliamentary press gallery when he asked Prime Minister Stephen Harper about Homegrown prior to its opening night. According to Wheeler all reporters had agreed upon a question about a prominent issue of the day which they would all ask if they were called upon for a question from the Prime Minister.

Some local writers and politicians were critical of the play, for what they described as its sympathetic portrayal of a "terrorist". Critics asserted that Frid should not have received government arts council funding to help support her writing the play. Frid defended her portrayal on the grounds that the case against Shareef was more complicated than was generally understood. James Moore, the Heritage Minister cancelled funding for Summerworks in June 2011. Reporters widely assumed that the cancellation of support for SummerWorks was a politically motivated reaction to Frid's play. In response theatres across the country scheduled readings of the play.
