= Anti-Terrorism Act (Canada) =

Canadian law extending security measures to combat terrorism

Anti-terrorism Act

37th Canadian Parliament
- Long title: An Act to enact the Security of Canada Information Sharing Act and the Secure Air Travel Act, to amend the Criminal Code, the Canadian Security Intelligence Service Act and the Immigration and Refugee Protection Act and to make related and consequential amendments to other Acts
- Citation: S.C. 2001, c. 41
- Enacted by: 37th Canadian Parliament
- Assented to: December 18, 2001

The Anti-terrorism Act (French: Loi antiterroriste) is an Act passed by the Parliament of Canada in response to the September 11, 2001, attacks in the United States. It received Royal Assent on December 18, 2001, as Bill C-36 of the 37th Canadian Parliament. The "omnibus bill" extended the powers of government and institutions within the Canadian security establishment to respond to the threat of terrorism.

The expanded powers were highly controversial due to widely perceived incompatibility with the Canadian Charter of Rights and Freedoms, in particular for the Act's provisions allowing for 'secret' trials, preemptive detention and expansive security and surveillance powers. This Act enables the List of Terrorist Entities under its section 83.05.

== History ==
It was opposed by Parliamentarians Marjory LeBreton and Andrew Telegdi, amongst others.

Some of the bill's provisions were set to expire on March 1, 2007. The Harper government urged that these be renewed, while all three opposition parties were opposed. Specifically, the provisions had to do with preventative arrest and investigative hearings. On February 28, 2007, the House of Commons voted 159–124 against renewing the provisions, which later led to their expiry, as originally planned in the sunset clause.

In January 2010, Zakaria Amara, from Mississauga, a suspect in the 2006 Toronto terrorism case, was sentenced to imprisonment for life. This sentence was the stiffest given so far under the Act. Saad Gaya from Oakville, a fellow suspect in the same case, was sentenced to 12 years in prison.

In 2012, the Government of Canada introduced in the Senate of Canada Bill S-7, the Combating Terrorism Act, which was to renew the expired provisions for a new five-year term, and introduced new crimes for leaving Canada to join or train with a terror group. The bill also increased the maximum prison sentences for some offences related to harbouring suspected terrorists. On April 19, just after the Boston Marathon bombing, the government rearranged the Parliamentary agenda to fast-track Bill S-7 to a vote on April 22 or 23, 2013. The Act received royal assent on April 25, 2013.

On the first anniversary of the October 7 attacks in a speech to a Jewish group, opposition leader Pierre Poilievre called upon the federal government to list western Yemen’s Houthi movement as a terrorist organization in Canada, according to section 83.05 of the Act.

== Reactions ==
The Act's passage has been compared to the government's activation of the War Measures Act in accordance to terrorist activity by the FLQ.

Criminal defense lawyer David Paciocco opposed it at the time of its passage.

Ziyad Mia, of the Toronto Muslim Lawyers Association, "questioned whether the definition of terrorist activity would apply to a group that resisted, by acts of violence, the regimes of Saddam Hussein or Robert Mugabe," and pointed out that it criminalized the French Resistance and Nelson Mandela.

== See also ==
- Anti-terrorism Act, 2015
- Anti-terrorism legislation
- PROFUNC
