= Younes Tsouli =

Younes Tsouli is a Moroccan-born resident of the United Kingdom who, in 2007, was found guilty of incitement to commit acts of terrorism (a crime introduced in the Terrorism Act 2006) and sentenced to 16 years in prison. His crimes were carried out via the internet, where he was known by several pseudonyms based on variations of Irhabi 007; "Irhabi" being the Arabic word for "terrorist", and "007" a reference to the fictional British secret agent, James Bond.

Tsouli's activities included setting up web sites and web forums in support of Al-Qaeda and distributing video material filmed by the Iraqi insurgency. His primary co-conspirators were Waseem Mughal and Tariq Al-Daour. Their activities were funded by Al-Daour, who was found to be in possession of 37,000 credit card details, which were linked to more than €2.5 million worth of fraudulent transactions. Tsouli has been called the "world's most wanted cyber-jihadist", and his conviction was the first under British law for incitement to commit an act of terrorism through the internet.

== Activities from 2003–2005 ==
Tsouli first appeared on web forums in 2003. He attracted the attention of Aaron Weisburd on a forum called "Islamic Terrorists", where he initially appeared to be a harmless agitator, "At first I started publishing bits and pieces of what he was doing online for comic relief, and really had no appreciation of where he was headed". Tsouli and Weisburd taunted each other online "I would give him a message like, 'Your days are numbered – you’re going to get caught'. He, on the other hand, was participating in discussions about which part of my body they wanted when I was killed, and he said he wanted one of my fingers as a souvenir". In 2004, Weisburd geolocated Tsouli to Ealing in West London, and passed this information on to the authorities.

In early 2004, Tsouli joined two now defunct password-protected forums sympathetic to al-Qaeda in Iraq, Muntada al-Ansar al-Islami (Islam Supporters Forum) and al-Ekhlas (Sincerity). There, he gained a reputation as a resident expert on Internet technologies, especially on matters on both enhancing and defeating on-line security. He was well known as someone who could break into a web site and hide files containing al-Qaeda propaganda on these sites (examples of such propaganda include the Abu Musab al-Zarqawi produced film All Is for Allah's Religion, the al-Qaeda Internet magazine Voice of Jihad (Sawt al Jihad), and videos of the beheading of Americans Nick Berg, Jack Hensley and Paul Marshall Johnson, Jr.). He would then post links to these covert files on the forums he belonged to. He also mentored other volunteers on the art of computer cracking, both by answering questions on-line and through an al-Ekhlas posting entitled "Seminar on Hacking Websites".

Eventually, Tsouli started posting non-computer related instructional material on-line, including tutorials on making suicide bomb vests and other explosive devices. He also started distributing cracked versions of computer software, including Arabic language translation software.

On 5 June 2005, Tsouli wrote "I am still the terrorist 007, one of the most wanted terrorists on the internet. I have the Feds and the CIA, both would love to catch me, I have MI6 on my back". Following the 7 July 2005 London bombings, Tsouli wrote: "Brother, I am very happy. From the moment that the infidels cry, I laugh."

Between April and October 2005, he was contacted by American Ehsanul Sadequee, who sent him a videotape he had made of potential targets including the United States Capitol building, the World Bank, a Masonic temple, and a fuel depot.

== Arrest and conviction ==
On 11 September 2005, a group calling itself "al-Qaeda in Northern Europe" posted a declaration on the al-Ansar web site. Following this, 18-year-old Swedish citizen Mirsad Bektašević, who was one of those responsible for the declaration, travelled to Bosnia where he and Abdulkadir Cesur filmed a video in which they wore ski masks, and, surrounded by weapons and explosives, said that they intended to attack sites in Europe to punish nations with forces in Iraq and Afghanistan. On 17 October 2005 Bektašević was arrested in Sarajevo, and analysis of his laptop identified Tsouli in his buddy list and his mobile phone records showed that he had recently called Tsouli. The Metropolitan Police were informed, and on 21 October 2005, Tsouli was arrested in a raid on a house in Shepherd's Bush, London. He was charged under the UK's Terrorism Act 2000 for "conspiracy to murder, conspiracy to cause an explosion, conspiracy to obtain money by deception, fundraising and possession of articles for terrorist purposes".

The trial began in May 2007. Judge Peter Openshaw caused some controversy when he halted the trial to ask what a web site was, saying "The trouble is I don’t understand the language. I don’t really understand what a website is." Following this, Professor Tony Sammes was called upon to give a presentation which explained what the internet is, how people can access the internet, and what web sites are.

At the trial, Tsouli's technical skills were emphasised. Evan Kohlmann testified, "007 came at this with a Western perspective. He had a flair for marketing, and he had the technical knowledge and skills to be able to place this stuff in areas on the net where it wouldn’t be easily erased, where lots of people could download it, view it and save it."

On 4 July 2007, after two months at trial, Tsouli and his co-defendants Waseem Mughal and Tariq Al-Daour pleaded guilty to "inciting another person to commit an act of terrorism wholly or partly outside the UK which would, if committed in England and Wales, constitute murder" (a crime introduced in the s 59 Terrorism Act 2000) and admitted to conspiring together and with others to defraud banks, credit card companies and charge card companies. Tsouli was sentenced to 10 years imprisonment, Mughal to 7½ years, and Al-Daour to 6½ years. On 18 December 2007, at the Court of Criminal Appeal, the sentences of all three men were increased – Tsouli's sentence was increased to 16 years, Mughal to 12 years and Al Daour 12 years. At the time of their conviction, Tsouli was 23 years old, Mughal was 24 years old, and al-Daour was 21 years old.

== Release ==
After a failed attempt to claim asylum in the UK, upon his release from prison in 2015 Tsouli was deported to Morocco. There he is reported to have chastised his family about their lifestyle, then after setting fire to the family's home in Rabat, he climbed across rooftops to the apartment building that housed the Consul General of the UK and threatened to kill himself with a knife. According to media reports, it took nearly 13 hours for the police with the assistance of a psychiatrist to persuade Tsouli to surrender. After initially being arrested he was later released by the Moroccan authorities, who complained to the UK government that they had not been informed of the danger Tsouli posed.

== Sources ==
- Gabriel Weimann, Terror on the Internet: The New Arena, (2006) The New Challenges. Washington, DC: United States Institute of Peace Press. Contains an in-depth analysis of Tsouli.
