= Maplehurst Correctional Complex =

Prison in Milton, Ontario, Canada

Coordinates: 43°31′35″N 79°53′53″W

- Interactive map of Maplehurst Correctional Complex
- Location: Milton, Ontario, Canada
- Status: Open
- Security class: Medium/Maximum
- Capacity: 1,500
- Opened: 3 May 1974
- Managed by: Ministry of the Solicitor General

Maplehurst Correctional Complex (French: Complexe Correctionnel de Maplehurst) is a correctional facility located in Milton, Ontario for women and men 18 years of age and older. It is a combined maximum security detention centre for remanded prisoners, and medium/maximum correctional centre for offenders sentenced to less than two years. It used to have a separate wing for minors (12 to 17 years of age) but no longer houses them. It is also known colloquially as the "Milton Hilton" or "Muppethurst".

== History ==
In 1972, the government started a $13.6 million construction project for the Maplehurst Correctional Centre. It was completed and opened in May 1974 and continues to operate to this day. Sod was turned on the project on February 9, 1973.

Maplehurst Correctional Complex was built in the mid-1970s as a replacement for several older facilities including the Milton Jail, Halton County Jail, and the Mimico Correctional Centre, although the latter ultimately remained open. In 1978 inmates at the old Milton Jail were moved to the Maplehurst Correctional Centre after an addition was added to the institution that was initially opened by the province of Ontario four years earlier.

John Main was the facility's first administrator (warden), and came over from Mimico.

A riot at Maplehurst Correctional Centre in Milton occurred in 1979, during which 18 convicts escaped from the facility. More than $95,000 worth of recreational equipment was smashed. Seven of the escapees were recaptured in the immediate aftermath.

It was expanded in the late 1980s and again in the early 21st century.

At the official opening of the $89 million modernization in 2001, the Ontario government described the complex as the first facility in Ontario's correctional system to feature a new design with pods: self-contained, 192-bed units where inmates spend their day - including program areas and an outdoor space for exercise. The complex is the size of 100 football fields and was the first of so-called "super-jails" in Ontario. General Population, Protective Population and Segregation/Hospital units are all housed within the facility. It shares its location with the adjacent Vanier Centre for Women, a 333-bed medium and maximum security facility for remanded and sentenced female offenders.

The prison provides a variety of remedial programs, including life skills, addictions, anger management and Alcoholics Anonymous.

In 2021, the Ministry of Labour issued nine orders of unsafe work conditions after an outbreak of COVID-19 was declared at the institution.

In June 2025, the Ontario Ombudsman launched an investigation into the facility's inmate treatment after multiple complaints stemming from a December 2023 incident in which inmates were forcibly stripped to their underwear and made to sit with zip tied wrists facing a wall by a crisis intervention team. The investigation will cover the government response and recommendations to avoid repeat incidents. In October 2025, three men accused of first degree murder had their charges stayed because they had their Charter rights violated by the strip search incident, with the judge ruling that they had been subjected to "torturous state action" done for vengeance and retribution. The decision found that some inmates from the incident had been left in their boxer briefs for up to two days.

== Notable prisoners ==
- Eric Carty, conspirator in the Jennifer Pan affair
- Snow served eight months of a year sentence for assault causing bodily harm at Maplehurst in the early 1990s.
- Lloyd Banks was held at Maplehurst in 2010 after being arrested with forcible confinement, aggravated assault and robbery in Kitchener, Ontario.

== See also ==
- List of correctional facilities in Ontario
