= 2006 Ontario terrorism plot =

Plot by Islamic extremists

2006 Ontario terrorism case
- Saad Khalid and Saad Gaya, two of the Toronto 18, handling fertilizer just before authorities arrested them
- Location: Ottawa and Toronto
- Date: June 2, 2006 – Planned but never executed
- Target: Various places in Canada and Southern Ontario, including Parliament Hill, the Prime Minister of Canada, CSIS Headquarters, and the Toronto Stock Exchange.
- Attack type: Conspiracy
- Deaths: 0
- Injuries: 0
- No. of participants: 18 (11 convicted)

The 2006 Ontario terrorism case was the plotting of a series of attacks against targets in Southern Ontario, Canada, and the June 2, 2006 counter-terrorism raids in and around the Greater Toronto Area that resulted in the arrest of 14 adults and 4 youths (the "Toronto 18"). These individuals have been characterized as having been inspired by al-Qaeda.

They were accused of planning to detonate truck bombs, to open fire in a crowded area, and to storm the Canadian Broadcasting Centre, the Parliament of Canada building, the Canadian Security Intelligence Service (CSIS) headquarters, and the parliamentary Peace Tower to take hostages and to behead the Prime Minister and other leaders.

Following the jury trial in June 2010, a comprehensive presentation of the case and the evidence obtained from court exhibits previously restricted was given by Isabel Teotonio of the Toronto Star. It contained the details on guilty pleas, convictions, and stayed/dismissed charges. The Ontario Court of Appeal released their decision on December 17, 2010.

Seven adults pleaded guilty, including the two ringleaders—Fahim Ahmad, who was sentenced to 16 years, and Zakaria Amara, who received a life sentence and initially had his Canadian citizenship revoked but later restored following the passage of Bill C-6. The remaining five received sentences ranging from seven to 20 years. A further three adults and one youth were convicted at trial; the youth was sentenced to 2.5 years while the adults received sentences of 6.5 years, ten years, and life imprisonment. Four adults and two youths were released after the charges against them were stayed and one youth had his charges dismissed.

== Pre-arrest events ==
=== Infiltration ===
On November 27, 2005, Mubin Shaikh (a police agent) met with members of the terrorist group at an information meeting at a banquet hall regarding the use of security certificates in Canada, and began his infiltration of the group. He was told that they had planned a training camp near Orillia. They asked Shaikh if he would join them and teach them how to use a gun, since he had mentioned his military and martial arts training, and shown them his Possession and Acquisition Licence.

=== Orillia training camp ===
The trip by the group, ages 15–42, was to a wooded area near Orillia, Ontario, from December 18–31, 2005. It was monitored by more than 200 police officers.

Authorities say that "the internet played a large role in the suspects' planning". Six months prior to the planned attack, the group watched a video over the internet of Anwar al Awlaki (the imam who was connected to three of the 9/11 hijackers) preaching about the need for jihad.

The ringleader gave sermons comparing the Canadian countryside to Chechnya, and calling for victory over "Rome", which prosecutors alleged was a reference to Canada. "Whether we get arrested, killed, or tortured, our mission is greater than just individuals," he said. He also said: "We're not officially al-Qaida but we share their principles and methods" around a campfire.

In 2008, a video made at the camp documenting their actions was made public, after the media obtained them through the British trial of Aabid Khan (who was convicted of being a terrorist propagandist), thus working around the publication ban that forbade them from showing evidence from the Canadian trials. The home video showed masked men in winter camouflage marching through the snow in an Ontario forest, shouting "Allahu Akbar"—or "God is Great"—while waving a black flag. The video was obtained by the NEFA Foundation (Nine-Eleven Finding Answers Foundation).

The video also showed the men daring each other to jump over campfires, and driving in a Canadian Tire parking lot late at night, alternatively described as "evasive driving maneuvers" or simply having fun driving doughnuts on the slippery ice. The film had been dubbed with Nasheed music, and the informant admitted that he had "choreographed" some of the scenes, arranging the campers to perform for the camera in a militant fashion upon the instruction of Zakaria Amara who did the filming. The youths frequented the local coffee shop, still dressed in their fatigues.

Shaikh, the police agent, was accused by the defence of having played a "key role" in setting up and running the trip, purchasing many of the supplies used, and being the "military trainer" at the camp. Shaikh gave firearms lessons to the accused, but at their request purchased a rifle and ammunition for the group. Shaikh showed the "campers" how to fire an illegal 9 mm handgun and ammunition which belonged to Faheem Ahmad. He also gave "exhortational sermons on Jihad", but described the camp itself as hapless.

=== Rockwood training camp ===
Held over two days in May 2006 at the Rockwood Conservation Area, the second camping trip, consisting of 10 people, came after members complained about fearing that police would arrest them for having known two Americans who had just been arrested.

A youth, who cannot be named, appeared in videos with the rest of the group, meant to mimic Jihadist beheading videos coming out of the Invasion of Iraq, sitting in front of a flag, and flanked by two hunting knives. During the filming, the leader kept trying to effect giggles from the adolescents, who were trying "to look tough" for the "mock" video.

=== Targets ===
The group was preparing a large-scale terrorist attack in southern Ontario. They planned to detonate truck bombs in at least three locations, and open fire in a crowded area. They also made plans to storm various buildings such as the Canadian Broadcasting Centre and the Canadian Parliament building, and take hostages. Law enforcement authorities identified other targets, including the CSIS headquarters, the Parliamentary Buildings' Peace Tower, and power grids.

According to one of the suspect's lawyers, they were also accused of planning to "behead the Prime Minister", Stephen Harper, and other leaders.

== Arrests, reaction, and court proceedings ==
=== Arrests ===
External videos
- Video footage of the sting operation in which two suspects were arrested

The raids were carried out by a Canadian inter-agency task force, the Integrated National Security Enforcement Team (INSET), which coordinated the activities of the Royal Canadian Mounted Police (RCMP), the CSIS, the Ontario Provincial Police (OPP), and other police forces, as the operation was spread across several different jurisdictions in southern Ontario, in the area north of Toronto.

The police stated that one of the arrested men ordered three metric tonnes (6,600 pounds) of ammonium nitrate fertilizer, a potentially powerful ingredient often used as quarry and mining explosives. This weight has widely been compared to the amount of ammonium nitrate used in the 1995 Oklahoma City bombing in the United States. The official account estimates the ammonium nitrate in the Oklahoma City bomb at 2,000 pounds, or about 0.9 metric tonnes. There was not any imminent danger to the public, as a harmless substance was substituted for the ordered ammonium nitrate and delivered to the men by INSET officers in a sting operation.

The RCMP said that the CSIS had been monitoring the individuals since 2004, later joined by the RCMP. The suspects, all adherents to a radical form of Islam, were alleged by CSIS to have been inspired by al-Qaeda. A direct connection seems unlikely.

The investigation started with intelligence officials monitoring Internet chat sites. The suspects were charged under the anti-terrorism legislation passed by Canadian parliament in December 2001 in response to the September 11 attacks in the US.

Two men, Yasim Abdi Mohamed and Ali Dirie, were already serving a two-year prison sentence for trying to smuggle a pair of handguns across the Peace Bridge a year earlier, for "personal protection" for themselves since they had worked as designer clothing re-sellers in seedy neighborhoods. They had their charges upgraded to "importing weapons for terrorist purposes" after it was revealed that their third handgun had been meant to repay Ahmad who had used his credit card to pay for their rental car.

== Suspects of the Toronto 18 ==
- Fahim Ahmad, 21, Toronto, born in Afghanistan and came to Canada at age 10; pleaded guilty and was sentenced to 16 years. Denied parole on June 10, 2014. Denied statutory release on August 26, 2015. Sentence ended on January 24, 2018.
- Zakaria Amara, 20, Mississauga, born in Jordan and came to Canada at age 12; pleaded guilty and received a life sentence without the possibility of parole for 10 years. Denied parole on June 2, 2016. Granted day parole in November 2022. Granted full parole in October 2026.
- Shareef Abdelhaleem, 30, Mississauga, born in Egypt and came to Canada at age 10; convicted at trial and received a life sentence without the possibility of parole for 10 years. Granted day parole in January 2021. Granted full parole in June 2023.
- Saad Khalid, 19, Mississauga, born in Saudi Arabia of Pakistani descent and came to Canada at age 9; pleaded guilty and was sentenced to 20 years. Denied parole on March 4, 2016. Statutory release was May 4, 2018.
- Saad Gaya, 18, Mississauga, born in Canada of Pakistani descent; pleaded guilty and was sentenced to 18 years. Granted day parole on December 30, 2015. Statutory release was in January 2017.
- Amin Durrani, 19, Toronto, born in Pakistan and came to Canada at age 12; pleaded guilty on January 20, 2010 and was sentenced to 7.5 years and released after being credited with time served for nearly 3 years and 8 months of pre-trial custody.
- Jahmaal James, 23, Toronto, born in Canada, family immigrated from the West Indies; pleaded guilty on February 26, 2010 and was sentenced to 7 years and 7 months and released after 1 day after being credited with 3 years and 9 months of pre-trial custody.
- Steven Chand, 25, Toronto, born in Canada, family immigrated from Fiji, a recent convert to Islam and a former Canadian soldier; convicted at trial and was sentenced to 10 years. Released on July 6, 2011.
- Ali Dirie, 22, Toronto, born in Somalia and came to Canada at age 7; pleaded guilty and was sentenced to 7 years. Released in October 2011 and left Canada in 2012 and reportedly died in 2013 fighting in the Syrian Civil War.
- Asad Ansari, 21, Mississauga, born in Pakistan and moved to Saudi Arabia at 7 months old and came to Canada at age 12; convicted at trial and was sentenced on October 4, 2010 to 6 years and 5 months and released after 1 day after being credited with 3 years and 3 months of pre-trial custody.
- Qayyum Abdul Jamal, 43, Mississauga, born in Pakistan and came to Canada as an adult, an active member of the mosque who frequently led prayers; released after charges against him were stayed.
- Yasim Abdi Mohamed, 24, Toronto, born in Somalia and came to Canada at age 5; released after the charges against him were stayed.
- Ahmad Mustafa Ghany, 21, Mississauga, born in Canada, family immigrated from Trinidad and Tobago; released after the charges against him were stayed.
- Ibrahim Aboud, 19, Mississauga, born in Iraq and came to Canada in his mid-teens; released after the charges against him were stayed.

The identities of the four minors were legally protected by Canada's Youth Criminal Justice Act. One was convicted at trial and sentenced to 2.5 years; the publication ban on his name was lifted in September 2009, and he was identified as Nishanthan Yogakrishnan, a convert to Islam from Hinduism. The other 3 minors were released after the charges against them were dismissed or stayed.

Six of the 18 men arrested have ties to the Al Rahman Islamic Center near Toronto, a Sunni mosque. Another two of those arrested were already serving time in a Kingston, Ontario, prison on weapons possession charges. According to the U.S. Federal Bureau of Investigation (FBI) two other men, Syed Ahmed and Ehsanul Sadequee, who were arrested in Georgia in the United States on terrorism charges, are connected to the case as well.

John Thompson, president of the Mackenzie Institute, a Toronto think tank, summarized the young suspects stating "These are kids at a transition, between Islamic society and Western society. A lot of people will get militarized if they're unsure of their own identity. They're just young and stupid. If you're 17, bored, restless, you want to meet girls – hey, be a radical." "The cops have a nickname for it – the jihad generation," says Thompson.

=== Impact ===
On the night following the arrests, the Rexdale mosque in Toronto was vandalized, as windows were smashed across the building as well as the cars in the parking lot. Similar vandalism was reported at another mosque in Toronto.

The arrests sparked several comments by politicians in the US regarding the security of Canada, including those of US Congressman Peter King, who on June 6 was reported to have said that there is allegedly "a large al-Qaeda presence in Canada [...] because of their very liberal immigration laws [and] because of how political asylum is granted so easily".

John Hostettler, American chairman of the House Judiciary subcommittee on Border Security said the arrest illustrated that "South Toronto" served as an "enclave for radical discussion", where people held "a militant understanding of Islam". His comments were widely ridiculed by Canadians who pointed out that there is no area of Toronto known as "South Toronto" (the downtown core of the city sits on the north shore of Lake Ontario, placing "South Toronto" in the water), and that none of the suspects were even from the downtown core. Both Canada's Conservative government and the Liberal opposition condemned the "completely uninformed and ignorant remarks".

=== Reporting controversy ===
The initial reports of this incident caused some controversy when a Royal Canadian Mounted Police officer, Mike McDonell, described the arrested people as representing a "broad strata" of Canadian society, and the Toronto Star claimed that it was "difficult to find a common denominator" among them, even though all were radical Muslims and many attended the same mosque. Some in the media, such as Andrew C. McCarthy in National Review, have described this as a tendency of the police and media to whitewash a role of militant Islam in contemporary terrorism.

The media coverage of the arrests was accused of bringing to light underlying racism in Canadian media, after a number of incidents including The Globe and Mail newspaper's use of the term "brown-skinned young men" in describing the men who had rented a storage unit.

Imam Aly Hindy, who knew nine of the accused youths personally, said he had doubted any of them "did anything wrong", adding that "If some of them are guilty, I don't think it's terrorism. It may be criminal, but it's not terrorism."

=== Court proceedings ===
A preliminary hearing started June 4, 2007, for the remaining 14 terrorism suspects. It was halted by the Crown Attorney on September 24, 2007, so the case could proceed directly to trial. The move (called a "preferred indictment", or a "direct indictment") meant defense counsel could not hear the balance of the testimony of the Crown's key witness, police informant Mubin Shaikh, who was in the middle of testifying.

At the opening trial, against the sole remaining youth, prosecutors alleged that comments that referred to "shotgun on Blondie" were actually a pretext to sexually assault non-Muslims.

Syed Haris Ahmed was convicted in June 2009 of conspiring to support terrorism, and Ehsanul Islam Sadequee was convicted of plotting to support "violent jihad" in August 2009. The two men were alleged to have met with members of the Toronto 18 in Canada in 2005.

In September 2008 Nishanthan Yogakrishnan, who was a minor when charged, was convicted of knowingly participating in the plot. In May 2009, he was sentenced to two and a half years, and received credit for time served. Ontario Superior Court Judge John Sproat ruled there was "overwhelming" evidence that a terrorist conspiracy existed. He was the first person to be found guilty under Canada's 2001 Anti-Terrorism Act, passed following the September 11, 2001 attacks.

Saad Khalid pleaded guilty in May 2009 to aiding a plot to set off bombs at the Toronto Stock Exchange, the CSIS Toronto headquarters, and a military base between Toronto and Ottawa. He was sentenced to 14 years in prison.

In September 2009 Ali Mohamed Dirie admitted to being a member of a terrorist group. On a police wiretap, he called white people the "number 1 filthiest people on the face of the planet. They don't have Islam. They're the most filthiest people." He added: "In Islam there is no racism, we only hate kufar (non-Muslims)." The Crown and defence agreed on a seven-year sentence. In September 2013, it was reported Dirie had been killed fighting with rebels in the Syrian war. He had left Canada using someone else's passport.

Also in September 2009, al-Qaeda supporter Aabid Hussein Khan was sentenced to 14 years for his role in the bomb plot.

In October 2009, Zakaria Amara, described by prosecutors as the leader of the group, pleaded guilty to charges of participating in the activities of a terrorist group, bomb charges, and planning explosions likely to cause serious bodily harm or death.

In May 2010, Fahim Ahmad, described as a leader of the group, reversed his plea mid-trial and pleaded guilty.

==== Asad Ansari ====
Asad Ansari was 21 years old when arrested in June 2006, in Toronto. He spent 3 years and 3 months in pre-trial detention, of which 15 months straight were spent in solitary confinement. After bail was initially denied on 3 August 2009, Ansari was granted bail on 28 August. He was tried simultaneously with Steven Vikash Chand and Fahim Ahmad in Brampton until Ahmad pleaded guilty. The court heard that Ansari had attended a winter training camp in Washago, Ontario, in December 2005. Ansari and Chand were the only members of the 18 tried by jury rather than by a lone judge. On 23 June 2010, Ansari and Chand were both found guilty of knowingly participating in a terrorist group. On 3 October 2010, Asad was sentenced to 6 years and 5 months, but was released and placed on probation largely due to time served.

==== No entrapment ====
Defence counsel argued that police mole Shaikh was in effect entrapping one of the men through his actions as an instructor at a training camp he had infiltrated on behalf of the RCMP. Superior Court Justice John Sproat ruled in March 2009 that there was no entrapment, noting that the camp would have proceeded as planned without Shaikh's participation, and the training and indoctrination provided would have been similar. The judge held further: "The evidence is overwhelming that (the youth) would have committed the offence if he had never come into contact with Shaikh."

The roles of two Agents were made public amid defence allegations they "perhaps provoked" the youths to make militant statements. Shaikh had been paid $292,000 to "knowingly facilitate a terrorist activity" and asked to act as "moles" in the group, leading to accusations that they had "urged them to act, then sat back and counted [their] cash while the others went to jail". The Toronto Star reported that a well-known member of Toronto's Islamic community had infiltrated the alleged terrorist cell while on the police payroll as an informant, and that another mole had been involved in setting up the purchase of phony ammonium nitrate. Elsohemy, the second mole in the case, was placed in witness protection after he agreed to help the Royal Canadian Mounted Police arrange the phony ammonium nitrate purchase on behalf of the youths, which led to the allegations of a bomb plot.

A third man, Qari Kafayatullah, was an Afghan immigrant who frequently told the youths that he had knowledge of explosives, and convinced their parents to let them attend the upcoming December camp – promising that it was just a bit of fun for the young men, and that he would be the responsible adult present – even though there was never any indication he later attended.

In October 2009, a man described by prosecutors as the leader of the group, pleaded guilty to bomb charges, the fifth member of the so-called "Toronto 18" group to have admitted guilt or to have been found guilty. Zakaria Amara, 23, from Mississauga, pleaded guilty in a Brampton, Ontario, court to charges of participating in the activities of a terrorist group and planning explosions likely to cause serious bodily harm or death. In January 2010, Amara was sentenced to life imprisonment. The sentence was the stiffest given so far under the Anti-Terrorism Act.

Saad Gaya from Oakville, Ontario was convicted and sentenced to 12 years in prison for the Toronto 18 terrorism case in 2006. He was held at the Maplehurst Correctional Centre in Milton, Ontario. Released in 2020, he was given the green light in 2022 to become a practicing lawyer.

== Criticisms ==
The Canadian Coalition for Peace and Justice (CCPJ) filed submission on behalf of some of the arrested with the United Nations Human Rights Council, Fourth Universal Periodic Review Canada (2008). Lawyer for the CCPJ, Faisal Kutty, alleged on behalf of the CCPJ that Canada was in breach of its international commitments pursuant to various provisions of the Universal Declaration of Human Rights; the International Covenant on Civil and Political Rights; the International Covenant on Economic, Social and Cultural Rights; the Standard Minimum Rules for Treatment of Prisoners adopted by the First United Nations Congress in 1955; and the Basic Principles for the Treatment of Prisoners adopted by the United Nations General Assembly in 1990. He called on the Human Rights Council to investigate these allegations.

== See also ==
- 2014 shootings at Parliament Hill, Ottawa
- Buffalo Six
