= Mubin Shaikh =

Canadian counter-terrorism expert

Mubinoddin Shaikh
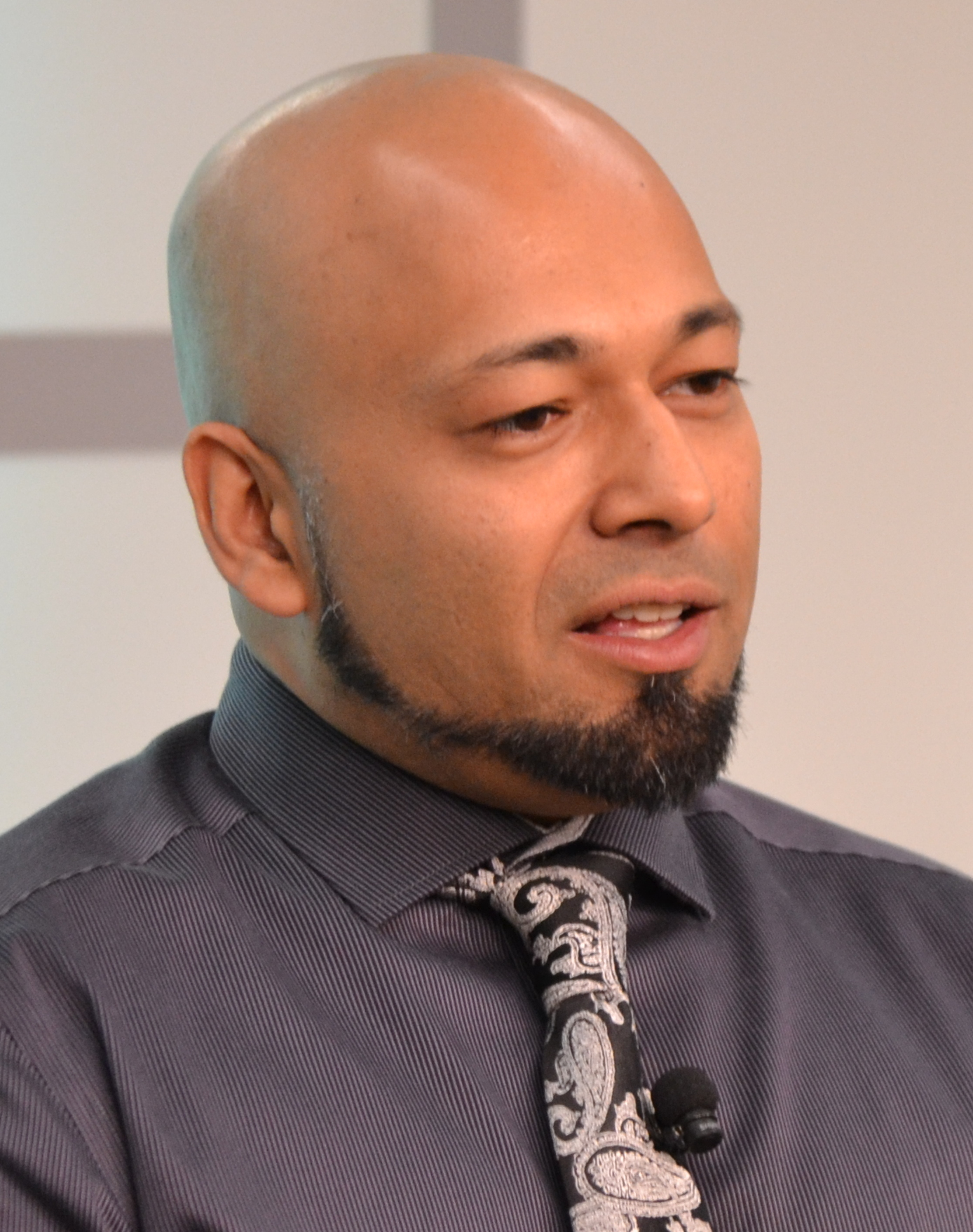
- Shaikh in 2015
- Born: Toronto, Ontario, Canada
- Occupations: Counter-terrorism and deradicalization expert

Mubinoddin "Mubin" Shaikh is a Canadian former security intelligence and counter-terrorism operative who was previously a jihadist extremist himself. He rose to prominence in his role as a confidential human source in the Toronto 18 case in 2006. As of April 2025 he has been a professor of public safety at Seneca College, an instructor at University of Ottawa in national security and intelligence and also a counter-extremism specialist for Parents for Peace, an NGO based in the United States, where he helps to dereadicalize young people caught up in extremism.

== Early life and education ==
Mubinoddin Shaikh was born and raised in Toronto, Ontario. He attended Quran school as a child as well as public school.

After an identity crisis when he was aged 19, he recommitted to Islam, and went to Pakistan, where a chance encounter with the Taliban as well as Canadian extremism propelled him into extremism. The 9/11 attacks led him to go to Syria to become involved in the "great jihad", but there he revised his views after being unable to reconcile violence against innocent victims of Islamic terrorism with his Islamic faith.

He then returned to Canada and began his national security operations work.

Shaikh earned a Master's degree of Policing, Intelligence, and Counter-Terrorism from Macquarie University, Australia, in April 2011.

== Career ==
Shaikh's operational experience originates with his role as an undercover counter-terrorism operative for the Canadian Security Intelligence Service (CSIS) in the 2006 Toronto terrorism case, also known as the "Toronto 18". He was active with CSIS for some years domestically, but the details of his activities are subject to national security restrictions and cannot be disclosed to the public.

Shaikh moved on to become a Royal Canadian Mounted Police agent with the Integrated National Security Enforcement Teams when one of the Service investigations uncovered a group of young Muslim men, of various ethnic backgrounds, intending to engage in criminal offences related to terrorism. It is clear from court evidence that the plot was well underway before CSIS had assigned Shaikh to the investigation. The investigation was formally moved from CSIS to the RCMP after Shaikh had verified the information that had been disclosed to him by the subjects of the investigation. After several public hearings (youth preliminary hearings in January 2007, adult preliminary hearings in September 2007, youth trial by judge in 2008, an "Abuse of Process" motion 2009, and a final Jury Trial of 3 remaining accused in 2010) and despite allegations of entrapment, Judge John Sproat, in March 2009, dismissed claims of entrapment and wrote in his ruling that Shaikh was cleared of any wrongdoing and "displayed a great number of the hallmarks of a truthful and credible witness," and that the group's plans were already underway prior to Shaikh's involvement and so could not have been the result of the state abusing its authority. In total, seven people had charges "stayed" because of the sympathetic testimony of Shaikh. A prosecutor in the case even accused Shaikh of lying to protect the youth accused. The judge, in his ruling, once again sided with Shaikh. At the end of the adult trial by jury of the remaining three persons in June 2010, after several others had pleaded guilty, a comprehensive presentation of previously-restricted information including court exhibits entered as evidence, complete with transcripts and video, was put forward by Isabel Teotonio of the Toronto Star. Zakaria Amara wrote a letter of apology and Faheem Ahmad gave an interview on his radicalization.

In 2012, with the rise of Islamic State (ISIS), Shaikh was extensively involved in countering ISIS ideology and has presented at numerous conferences as an expert, on his efforts. He has trained military forces directly engaged in the fight against ISIS, including being a regular guest speaker with Defense Intelligence Agency as well at the United States Air Force Special Operations School. Shaikh is also part of the instructor cadre of Reticle Ventures, made up of former members and leaders of Joint Task Force 2 and other police and security agencies and services.

In October 2015 Shaikh presented at the UN Event on Preventing Radicalization, Violent Extremism and Atrocity Crimes held in New York City.

In connection to his work on the ISIS Returnee file, Shaikh also had discussions with Abu Huzaifa al-Kanadi, who was charged in September 2020 with terrorism hoax, in relation to his claims about having been an ISIS executioner in Syria.

He has testified as an expert for the United Nations Security Council, the United States Senate Committee on Homeland Security and Governmental Affairs with NATO, the National Counterterrorism Center, and Special Operations Command Central and he is an external expert with the Joint Staff SMA for CENTCOM Command Staff.

He has also appeared on media outlets such as CNN, CBC, ABC, and NBC MSNBC, on matters related to extremism and terrorism.

As of April 2025 Shaikh was professor of public safety at Seneca College, an instructor at the University of Ottawa in national security and intelligence and also a counter-extremism specialist for Parents for Peace, an NGO based in the United States.

== Recognition ==
Shaikh has been recognized for his work and life in a permanent exhibit in the International Spy Museum in Washington, D.C.

== Publications ==
Shaikh is a co-author, with counter-terrorism researcher Anne Speckhard, of the book Undercover Jihadi: Inside the Toronto 18 Al Qaeda Inspired, Homegrown Terrorism in the West, published in 2014.
