= International propagation of the Salafi movement and Wahhabism by region =

Following the embargo by Arab oil exporters during the Arab–Israeli October 1973 War and the vast increase in petroleum export revenue that followed, the international propagation of Salafism and Wahhabism within Sunni Islam and throughout the Muslim world, favored by the conservative oil-exporting Kingdom of Saudi Arabia and other Gulf monarchies, achieved a "preeminent position of strength in the global expression of Islam." The Saudi interpretation of Islam not only includes Salafism and Wahhabism but also Islamist and revivalist interpretations of Islam, and a "hybrid" of the two interpretations (until 1990s).

During the Cold War following World War II, the United States and the United Kingdom launched covert and overt campaigns to encourage and strengthen Islamic fundamentalists in the Middle East, North Africa, and southern Asia. These Islamic fundamentalists were seen as a hedge against potential expansion by the Soviet Union, and as a counterweight against nationalist and socialist movements that were seen as a threat to the interests of the Western nations. In a 2018 interview with The Washington Post, Mohammed bin Salman, the de facto ruler of Saudi Arabia, said that Saudi Arabia's international propagation of the Salafi movement and Wahhabism was "rooted in the Cold War, when allies asked Saudi Arabia to use its resources to prevent inroads in Muslim countries by the Soviet Union."

From 1982 to 2005 the Saudi government, in an effort to spread the Salafi-Wahhabi brand of Islam across the world (dawah Salafiyya), spent over $75 billion via international organizations affiliated with the House of Saud (Note: The Muslim World League, the World Assembly of Muslim Youth, the International Islamic Relief Organization, and various Saudi royal charities. The propaganda campaign to spread the Salafi-Wahhabi brand of Islam has been led by Prince Salman bin Abdul-Aziz from 1982 to 2005, who was Minister of Defense at the time, and became king in January 2015.) and religious attaches at dozens of Saudi embassies, to establish/build 200 Islamic colleges, 210 Islamic centers, 1,500 mosques, and 2,000 schools for Muslim children in Muslim-majority countries and elsewhere. Mosque funding was combined with persuasion to propagate the dawah Salafiyya; schools were "fundamentalist" in outlook and formed a network "from Sudan to northern Pakistan". Supporting proselytizing or preaching of Islam (Note: Dawah, which literally means "making an invitation" to Islam.) has been called "a religious requirement" for Saudi rulers that cannot [or could not] be abandoned "without losing their domestic legitimacy" as protectors and propagators of Islam.

Other strict and conservative interpretations of Sunni Islam assisted by funding from the Gulf monarchies include the Muslim Brotherhood and Jamaat-e-Islami (until the break between the Muslim Brotherhood and Gulf monarchies in the 1990s). While their alliances were not always permanent, they were said to have formed a "joint venture", sharing a strong "revulsion" against Western influences, a belief in strict implementation of Islamic law (sharīʿa), an opposition to both Shia Muslims and popular Islamic religious practices (the veneration of Muslim saints and visitations of their tombs), and a belief in the importance of armed jihad. A "fusion", or "hybrid", of the two movements came out of the Afghan jihad, where thousands of Muslims were trained and equipped to fight against Soviets and their Afghan allies in Afghanistan in the 1980s.

The funding has been criticized for promoting an intolerant, fanatical form of Islam that several political scientists and scholars of international relations consider to be the core cause of Islamic extremism and religiously-motivated terrorism worldwide, along with the Islamist ideology and practice of excommunication (takfīr). In 2013, the European Parliament identified Wahhabism as the main source of global terrorism. Critics argue that some Arab volunteers who mobilized to fight in Afghanistan subsequently formed or joined militant organizations that waged insurgencies against governments and carried out attacks against civilians in other Muslim countries. They further argue that some groups that emerged from or were associated with these networks — including the Armed Islamic Group of Algeria, the Islamic State, and various al-Qaeda branches — targeted not only non-Muslims (kuffār) but also Muslims whom they regarded as apostates, including Shia Muslims and Sufi ascetics. As of 2017, changes to Saudi religious policy have led some to suggest that "Islamists throughout the world will have to follow suit or risk winding up on the wrong side of orthodoxy".

== Background ==
Religion in Saudi Arabia is dominated and heavily influenced by the Salafi brand of Sunni Islam and its Wahhabi ideology, a political and religious ideology named after Muhammad ibn Abd al-Wahhab, an 18th-century Sunni Muslim preacher, scholar, and theologian from the Najd region in central Arabia, founder of the Islamic revivalist and reformist movement known as Wahhabism. Despite being opposed and rejected by some of his contemporary critics amongst the religious clergy, Ibn ʿAbd al-Wahhab charted a religio-political pact with Muhammad bin Saud to help him to establish the Emirate of Diriyah, the first Saudi state, and began a dynastic alliance and power-sharing arrangement between their families which continues to the present day in the Kingdom of Saudi Arabia. The Al ash-Sheikh, Saudi Arabia's leading religious family, are the descendants of Ibn ʿAbd al-Wahhab, and have historically led the ulama in the Saudi state, dominating the state's clerical institutions.

Although Saudi Arabia had been an oil exporter since 1939, and active leading the conservative opposition among Arab states to Gamal Abdel Nasser's progressive and secularist Arab nationalism since the beginning of the Arab Cold War in the 1960s, it was the October 1973 War that greatly enhanced its wealth and stature, and ability to advocate Salafi missionary activities.

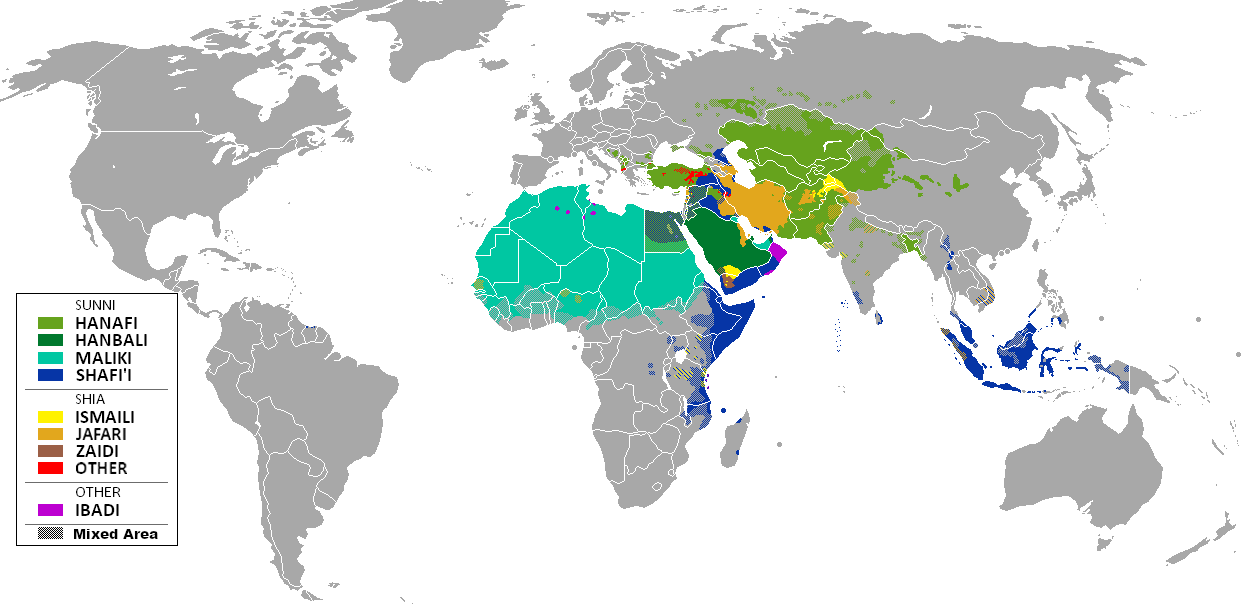
Map of the Muslim world. Hanbali (dark green) is the predominant Sunni school of Islamic jurisprudence in Saudi Arabia and Qatar.

Prior to the 1973 oil embargo, religion throughout the Muslim world was "dominated by national or local traditions rooted in the piety of the common people". Muslim clerics looked to their different schools of Islamic jurisprudence (the four legal schools in Sunni Islam, plus the Ja'fari school in Shia Islam):

- Hanafi in the Turkic lands, the Middle East, and South Asia;
- Maliki in the Sahara;
- Shafi'i in Southeast Asia and the Horn of Africa;
- Hanbali in parts of the Arabian Peninsula.

The first three schools "held Saudi inspired puritanism" (the Hanbali school) in "great suspicion on account of its sectarian character," according to French political scientist Gilles Kepel. But the legitimacy of this class of traditional Islamic jurists had become undermined in the 1950s and 60s by the power of post-colonial nationalist governments. In "the vast majority" of Muslim countries, the private religious endowments (awqaf) that had supported the independence of the Islamic scholars/jurists for centuries were taken over by the state and the jurists were made salaried employees. The nationalist rulers naturally encouraged their employees (and their employees interpretations of Islam) to serve their employer/rulers' interests, and inevitably the jurists came to be seen by the Muslim public as doing so.

== Western Europe ==
=== Belgium ===
According to Hind Fraihi, a Moroccan-Belgian journalist, Saudi-trained imams and literature from Saudi Arabia glorifying jihad and advocating Islam versus non-Muslims thinking was “part of the cocktail” (other factors being "economic frustration, racism, a generation that feels it has no future”) leading to the ISIL terror cell in Belgium committing terrorist acts in Paris and Brussels in 2015 and 2016 (in which a total of 162 people were killed). In the capital Brussels, as of 2016, 95 percent of the courses offered on Islam for Muslims used preachers trained in Saudi Arabia, according to European Network Against Racism. In February 2017 the Belgium Coordination Unit for Threat Analysis (OCAD/OCAM, which evaluates terrorist and extremist threats in and to Belgium) voiced concerns over the spread of Saudi-backed Salafism in Belgium and the rest of Europe, stating “An increasing number of mosques and Islamic centres in Belgium are controlled by Wahhabism. This is the Salafist missionary apparatus.”

=== Finland ===
A 2017 proposal to construct a large mosque in Helsinki to "unite all Finnish Muslims", has met with resistance from among others the incoming mayor of the capital (Jan Vapaavuori). This was because it is being funded by Bahrain and Saudi Arabia and may introduce "Sunni-Shia hate politics into Finland", as both Bahrain and Saudi Arabia are Sunni ruled and have cracked down on Shia protestors.

=== Germany ===
The German government has expressed concern that religious organizations from the Middle East may be supporting German Salafists through the construction of mosques, training facilities, and the utilization of radical preachers.

=== Iceland ===
In Reykjavík, the capital of Iceland where plans to build a new, larger mosque had been underway for more than a decade, there has been controversy over funding of the mosque. Following the 2015 Paris terror attacks, the President of Iceland, Ólafur Ragnar Grímsson announced that he was "shocked to the point of paralysis" to learn from Saudi Arabian Ambassador, that Saudi Arabia planned to donate $1 million to the building of a mosque. Grímsson expressed concern that Saudi Arabian financing of the mosque would fuel radical Islam in Iceland.

=== United Kingdom ===
According to a report by Anthony Glees, (Note: the director of Brunel University's Centre for Intelligence and Security Studies) extremist ideas being spread allow with donations from Saudi and Arab Muslim sources to British universities. Eight universities, "including Oxford and Cambridge", accepted "more than £233.5 million from Saudi and Muslim sources" from 1995 to 2008, "with much of the money going to Islamic study centres".

A 2012 article in Arab News reported

Over the past decade, Saudi Arabia has been the largest source of donations from Islamic states and royal families to British universities, much of which is devoted to the study of Islam, the Middle East and Arabic literature.

A large share of this money went toward establishing Islamic study centers. In 2008, Prince Al-Waleed bin Talal donated £8 million (SR 48.5 million) each to Cambridge and Edinburgh for this purpose, Al Eqtisadiah business daily reported yesterday. Oxford has been the largest British beneficiary of Saudi support. In 2005, Prince Sultan, the late crown prince, gave £2 million (SR 12 million) to the Ashmolean Museum. In 2001, the King Abdul Aziz Foundation gave £1 million (SR 6.1 million) to the Middle East Center. There are many other donors. Oxford's £75 million (SR 454.6 million) Islamic Studies Center was supported by 12 Muslim countries. Ruler of Oman, Sultan Qaboos bin Said al Said, gave £3.1 million (SR 18.8 million) to Cambridge to fund two posts, including a chair of Arabic.

Ruler of Sharjah [in the UAE], Sheikh Sultan bin Muhammad Al-Qasimi, has supported Exeter's Islamic studies center with more than £5 million (SR 30 million) since 2001. Trinity Saint David, part of the University of Wales, has received donations from the ruler of Abu Dhabi Sheikh Khalifa bin Zayed Al Nahyan.

In June 2017, following the London Bridge terror attack, opposition leader Jeremy Corbyn stated that the "difficult conversations" Prime Minister Theresa May called for should start with "Saudi Arabia and other Gulf states that have funded and fuelled extremist ideology".

A July 2017 report by the Henry Jackson Society, commissioned by the government of the UK, stated that Middle Eastern nations are providing financial support to mosques and Islamic educational institutions, which have been linked to the spread of extremist material with "an illiberal, bigoted Wahhabi ideology". The report said that the number of Salafi mosques in Britain had increased from 68 in 2007 to 110 in 2014.

== Balkans and Eastern Europe ==
Historically parts of the Balkans were introduced to Islam while under the domination of the Sufi-led Ottoman Empire and have majority or large minority Muslim populations. The fall of Communism and breakup of Yugoslavia, provided an opportunity for international Islamic charities to Islamization (or re-Islamization) people who had been living under an irreligious Communist government. Islamic charities—often with the backing of oil-rich Gulf kingdoms—built mosques and madrassas in Albania and other Balkan countries. In Bosnia, Salafism is getting established particularly in the remote villages.

=== Albania ===
A Muslim-majority country, Albania had been under anti-clerical communist control for 45 years when the Eastern bloc fell in 1991. The pro-Islamic Democratic Party was elected to power in 1992, and the government of Sali Berisha "turned to Saudi Arabia for financial support", and for assistance in "re-Islamizing" the country. Thirty NGOs and Islamic associations worked toward re-Islamization of Albania, including thirteen of the organizations formed a `Coordination Council of Arab Foundations. Saudi Arabia sponsored `Al Haramein` and `Musafaq` (which were based in Britain) foundations which "vied" with Islamic organizations from Libya, Sudan, Iran and Turkey in "instumentalization of humanitarian aid as a means of proselytization." At least the Saudi and Sunni Islamist groups preached for creation of an Islamic society influenced by Salafiyya doctrines. Saudi NGOs built 200 mosques and King Fahd of Saudi Arabia donated one million copies of an Albanian-language version of the Quran.

According to Olivier Roy and Antoine Sfeir, the "organized project undertaken by preachers and Islamic NGOs" was to "expunge indigenous Albanian ideas about Islam, before replacing it with a version of the faith more in conformity with the Wahhabi model. ... Islam in its most radical form was taught as the only true faith, while tolerance was seen as an indication of weakness. ... Hatred of the West was raised to the status of a creed."

One of the first Islamists to come to Albania was Muhammad al Zawahiri, (the brother of Ayman al Zawahiri, the leader of the Egyptian Islamic Jihad movement and Osama bin Laden's key lieutenant) as an accountant for the International Islamic Relief Organization (IIRO). (Unbeknownst to Albanians, in addition to helping with relief and spreading correct Islam, IIRO was charged with the task of helping other members of Islamic Jihad find jobs within "charitable organizations building mosques, orphanages and clinics." By the mid-1980s, the Tirana cell of Islamic Jihad numbered 16 members, including a specialist in false identity documents, a recruit wanted on suspicion of involvement in the attempted assassination. This was later exposed during an investigation carried out by the American and Albanian secret services, In June 1998 three Egyptian Islamist accused of terrorist activities were arrested in Albania, with further arrests in September after the 1998 United States embassy bombings. )

How successful the proselytizing has been is unclear. Roy and Sfeir believe that with NGO work in the 1990s "Islamists gained an important foothold", however, a 2012 Pew Research study found that only 15% of Muslims surveyed considered religion "a very important factor" in their lives—the lowest percentage in the world amongst countries with significant Muslim populations.

=== Bosnia ===
During the 1992-1995 Bosnian War, the state of Bosnia and Herzegovina (where the approximately 43% of the population that was Muslim formed the largest religious group) received aid from Saudi groups — International Islamic Relief Organization, Saudi High Commission for Relief, Muwaffaq Foundations — as well as from non-Saudi Islamic groups. A 1996 report by the CIA stated that "all of the major and most of the minor Islamic charities are significant players in the former Yugoslavia", particularly in aiding Bosnian Muslims, delivering food, clothing, and medicine; supporting orphanages, schools, hospitals, agricultural, and refugee camps; and constructing housing, infrastructure. According to the Saudi Embassy to the US, the Saudi Joint Committee for Collection of Donations for Bosnia donated $500 million in aid to Muslims for medical care, refugee camps, education during the Bosnian War, and later reconstruction projects for mosques and religious schools. In just one year (1994) Saudi nationals alone gave $150 million through Islamic NGOs for aid to Bosnia. However, a "growing body of reporting indicates that some of these charities are being used to aid Islamic extremist groups that engage in terrorism."

Aid to the local Bosnian Islamist party (the SDA) gave it leverage to undermined competing local secular and more traditional Muslim groups. The SDA prohibited consumption of alcohol and pork, "brought Muslim religious instruction into the schools, opened up prayer rooms, and used the leverage of its distribution of aid to pressurize the population to adopt Muslim names, to wear the veil, and grow beards." A 1992 conference on the protection of human rights in Bosnia brought together representatives from 30 Muslims countries. It passed resolutions declaring "without ambiguity that the aim of the Bosnian conflict was the extermination of Bosnia's Muslims."

"Afghan Arab" veterans fighting Serbs in Bosnia as volunteers took upon themselves Hisbah ("enjoin good and forbid wrong") including attempting to impose the veil on women and the beard on men. In addition they engaged in

causing disturbances in the ceremonies of [Sufi] brotherhoods they deemed to be deviant, .... smashing up cafes, and ... [organizing] sharia marriages to Bosnian girls that were not declared to the civil authorities.

Rather than spreading strict Islamic practice, these activities were so unpopular with the Bosnian public and media they were condemned by the SDA. According to Gilles Kepel, as of 2003, the only thing left of their presence were "a few naturalized Arab subjects married to Bosnian women."

From the end of the Bosnian War to 2007, Saudi-financed organizations spent about $700 million in Bosnia, "often in mosques", according to analysts quoted by the New York Times. "More than half a dozen new madrasas", (religious secondary schools), have been built throughout the country, as have dozens of mosques. In the capital and largest city Sarajevo, Saudi Arabia financed the King Fahd Mosque, a $28 million complex including a sports and cultural center. According to a former Bosnian intelligence agent (Goran Kovacevic) interviewed by a public television network in the US, (PBS), the mosque is well financed and "the most radical mosque in the whole Bosnia-Herzegovina. [...] All those guys that actually performed some kind of terrorist activity in Bosnia-Herzegovina were part of that mosque". In October 2008, eight people were injured when men in hoods attacked participants at a gay festival in Sarajevo, dragging some people from vehicles and beating others while they chanted, “Kill the gays!” and “Allahu Akbar!”

Salafi charity organizations also physically influenced Bosnian religious culture following the war. Saudis have helped restore some of the hundreds of mosques and monuments Serb nationalist forces destroyed during the war. While this assistance was badly needed and greatly helpful to the persecuted Bosniaks, it involved removing the Islamic calligraphy that adorned many Balkan Muslim tombstones, which Salafis considered idolatrous and unIslamic. Critics complain that the graveyards were "often all that was left" of the local Bosnian heritage.

=== Kosovo ===
One country where Saudi Arabia has been particularly successful in spreading conservative Salafism where once Sufi local Islamic beliefs held sway is Kosovo. Following the NATO bombing campaign of 1999 that helped Muslim Kosovo gain independence from Orthodox Christian Serbia, the Saudi government and private sources began to provide aid. Saudi citizens donated $20 million to Kosovo in cash as well as food and medical supplies, and the Saudi Red Crescent sent medical volunteers. The Saudi Joint Committee for Collection of Donations for Kosovo and Chechnya sent $45 million for humanitarian relief services (medical care, refugee camps, education, and later reconstruction of mosques and schools) to Kosovo according to the Embassy of Saudi Arabia in the US.

240 mosques have been built in Kosovo since the 1999 war. The Saudi Joint Committee for Relief of Kosovo and Chechnya built approximately 100 mosques in rural areas, some with Quranic schools adjacent, and sent 388 foreign teachers to spread "their interpretations of Islam".

Saudi-sponsored charities sponsored education, classes not only in religion but English and computers, often paying salaries and overhead costs. Families were given monthly stipends. All this was appreciated in the "poor and war ravaged" country but local Kosovar imams complained that stipends were given "on the condition that they attended sermons in the mosque and that women and girls wore the veil". “People were so needy, there was no one who did not join,” according to one Kosovo politician (Ajnishahe Halimi).

According to a critical article by journalist Carlotta Gall,

corps of extremist clerics and secretive associations funded by Saudi Arabia and other conservative Arab countries in the Persian Gulf region using an obscure, labyrinthine network of donations from charities, private individuals and government ministries ... [They] transformed this once-tolerant Muslim society at the hem of Europe into a font of Islamic extremism and a pipeline for jihadists.

Conservatives came to dominate the Islamic Community of Kosovo, the national Islamic organization.

Part of the Salafi influence can be found in more conservative practices, such as the refusal by some women to shake hands with or talk to male relatives. But threats — or acts — of violence against academics, journalists and politicians have also occurred. One imam in the city of Gjilan, Enver Rexhepi, was "abducted and savagely beaten by masked men" in 2004 after clashing with a Saudi trained student (Zekirja Qazimi) over whether to continue the long-standing practice of displaying the Albanian flag in his (Rexhepi's) mosque. (Qazimi believed the depiction of the dragon on the flag idolatrous.) Kosovo also had "the highest number" of Muslims per capita of any country in Europe leave to fight for ISIL in the two years from 2014 to 2016. Kosovar police have identified 314 people who have left Kosovo to join the Islamic State, "including two suicide bombers, 44 women and 28 children".

After two Muslims from Kosovo killed themselves in suicide bombings in Iraq and Turkey, Kosovo intelligence began an investigation of "sources of radicalism." The Saudi charity Al Waqf al Islami and twelve other Islamic charities were shut down, and 40 people arrested.

Saudi aid has also affected the architecture of Islam in Kosovo, leading to the dismantling of centuries-old Ottoman mosques whose ornamentation was offensive to Salafism, including the Hadim Suleiman Aga mosque and Library in Djakovica, Kosovo. Among the destroyed buildings are "a historic library in Gjakova and several 400-year-old mosques, as well as shrines, graveyards and Dervish monasteries".

According to Carlotta Gall, as of 2016 "Kosovo Central Bank figures show grants from Saudi Arabia averaging €100,000 a year for the past five years", a reduction from the decade earlier, (although payments can be diverted through another country" to obscure their origin and destination"). Picking up the slack in financing "hard-line" Islam have been donors in Kuwait, Qatar and the United Arab Emirates — each of which average "approximately €1 million a year" in donations.

=== Poland ===
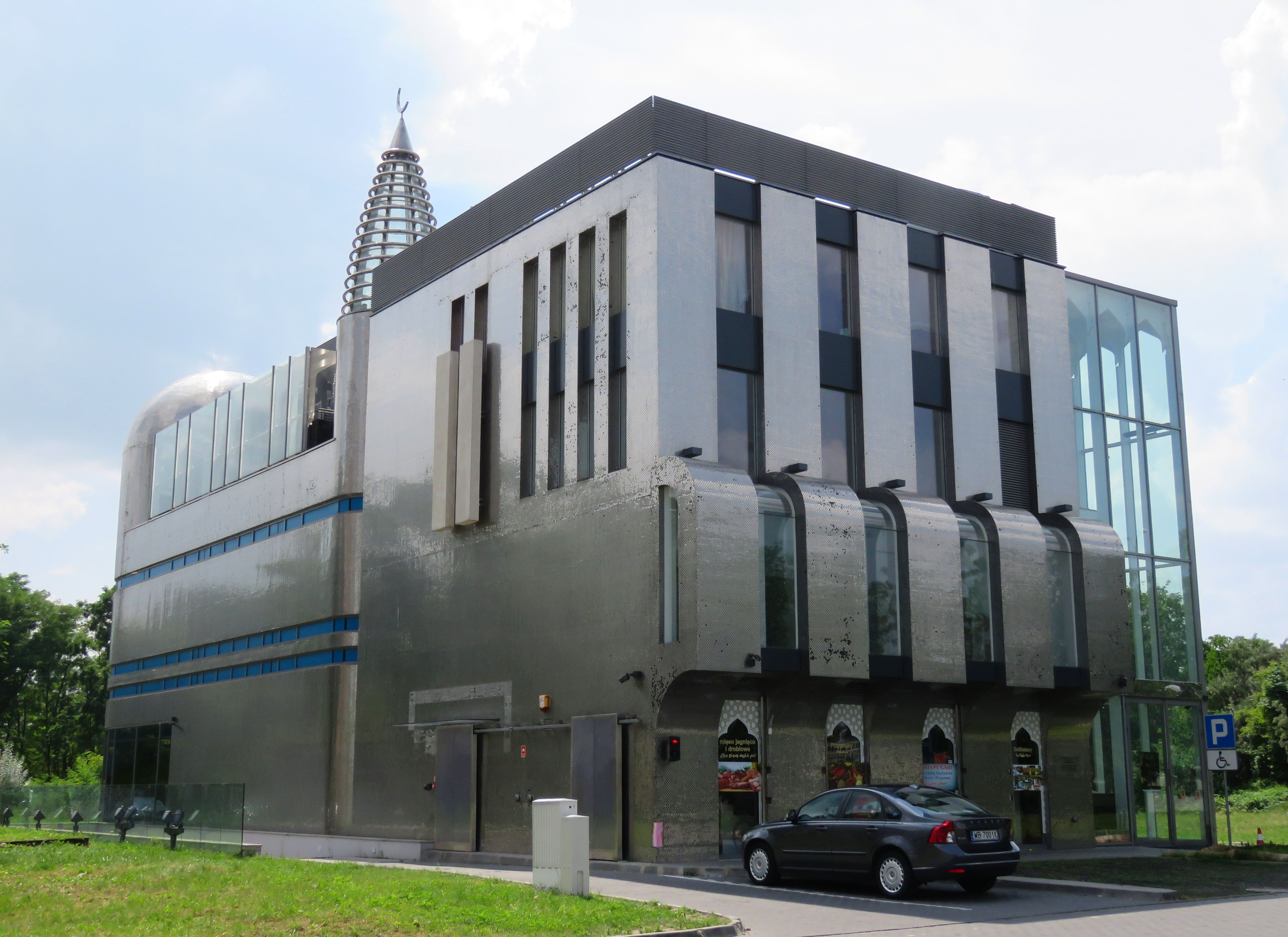
"The Centre of a Muslim Culture" (pl. Ośrodek Kultury Muzułmańskiej) was built in 2015 in Warsaw.

Although the majority Catholic country has an Islamic population of roughly only 0.1%, its indigenous Muslim population of Lipka Tatars (1,916 per 2011 census) only nominally adheres to Sunni Islam. However, together with an immigration of refugees and foreign students from Muslim majority countries, the Salafiyya movement started taking roots in the country, whilst coming in conflict with the Tatar's local practicing of the faith. A Saudi donor Shaykh Abdullatif al Fozan (ranked 51 in 2013 on the Forbes' list of richest Arabs) sponsored (4,000,000 euro) the construction of the "Center of a Muslim Culture" in Warsaw. The building is fully equipped; has a store, a restaurant, library, prayer hall and even a gym. While officially promoting (Sunni) Islam, the Center adheres to Salafi principles. Originally, it was meant to be built as a "Centre of Arabic Studies" adjacent to the University of Warsaw, but the University's staff refused the offer.

== Africa ==
=== East Africa ===
Saudi leaders have endeavoured to influence, trade, resources in Sudan, Kenya and Ethiopia Somalia which has also resulted in a regional rivalry between Sunni Muslim Saudi Arabia and Shia Muslim Iran. According to the Guardian, spread of Salafism, is a, "key concern of the west, and of many local players as well".

=== Sudan ===
Sudan, a poor country with a majority Muslim Arab population whose coastline lies just across the Red Sea from the Hijaz province of Saudi Arabia, has had close relations with the kingdom since the Arab Oil Embargo. However, the dominant interpretation of Islam in Sudan was very different from that of Saudis or Muslim Brotherhood. Popular local Islam of the Sufi or mystical brotherhoods (the Ansar and the Khatmiya) who were each attached to a political party, had great influence among the masses of Muslims. Saudi funding, investment, and labor migration from Sudan has all worked over time to change that.

Saudi provided funding for the Muslim Brotherhood whose local leader, Hassan al-Turabi, enjoyed "close relations" with "some of the more conservative members of the Saudi royal family".

In the fall of 1977, an Islamic bank with 60% of its start up capital coming from Saudi Arabia opened a branch in Sudan. By the mid-1980s this bank (Faisal Islamic Bank of Sudan) was second biggest in Sudan in terms of money held on deposit. Shortly after another similar bank (Al Baraka Bank) was founded. Both provided rewards for whose affiliated with Hassan al-Turabi's Islamist National Islamic Front—employment and wealth as a reward for young militant college graduates and low interest loans for investors and businessmen unable to find loans elsewhere.

In 1983 Saudis persuaded then-President Gaafar Nimeiry to institute sharia law including interest-free Islamic banking. The traditional Sudanese banking system was abolished and afterwards

any enterprise that needed capital had to be part of Turabi's network to gain access to financial markets. Over time, this has concentrated economic power in the old families from the "Three Tribes" who were loyal to the new regime"

and who have "transformed themselves into Islamists."

The influx of Sudanese labor migrants to Saudi as truck drivers, electricians, factory workers and sales clerks, was also significant. By 1985, according to one source, about 2/3 of the professional and skilled Sudanese workers were employed outside the Sudan, many in the Gulf States. (As of 2013 there were 900,000 Sudanese migrant workers in Saudi Arabia.)

Looking at the change in religious practices of a village in northern Sudan over a five-year period from 1982 to 1988, anthropology researcher Victoria Bernal found labor migration of villagers to Saudi Arabia "were catalysts for change, stimulating the rise of `fundamentalist` Islam in the village". Returning migrants "boldly" critiqued the Islamic authenticity of local practices such as "mourning rituals, wedding customs and reverence for holy men in particular." More well-to-do villagers were "building high brick or cement walls around their homes", women began wearing ankle-length robes. Traditional wedding rituals with singing and mixing of genders were called into question.

According to Victoria Bernel, "Adopting fundamentalist practices" had become a "way to assert one's sophistication, urbanity and material success." Migrant workers also formed connections with, and helped finance, the Muslim Brotherhood affiliated National Islamic Front political party which could remit their salaries back home to families in Sudan evading taxation in exchange for a percentage (that was less than the taxation). Saudi helped found the African Islamic Center (later the International University of Africa) to help train African Muslim preachers and missionaries "with the Salafist view of Islam."

As Hassan al-Turabi and his National Islamic Front grew in influence and in 1989 a coup d'état by Omar al-Bashir against an elected government negotiating to end the war with the animist and Christian South established Sudan as the first Sunni Islamist state. Al-Turabi became the "power behind the throne" of the al-Bashir government from 1989 to 1999. The revivalist tenure in power was not as successful as its influence on banking or migrant workers. International organizations alleged war crimes, ethnic cleansing, a revival of slavery, torture of opponents, an unprecedented number of refugees fleeing country, and Turabi and allies were expelled from power in 1999. The jihad in the south ended unsuccessfully with the south seceding from Sudan (forming South Sudan) taking with it nearly all of Sudan's oil fields. Turabi himself reversed earlier Islamist positions on marriage and inequality in favor of liberal positions, leading some conservatives to call him an apostate. Al Jazeera estimates that as of 2012 10% of Sudanese are tied to Salafi groups, (more than 60% of Sudanese are affiliated with Sufism), but that number is growing.

=== Egypt ===
Muslim Brethren who became wealthy in Saudi Arabia became key contributors to Egypt's Islamist movements. Many of Egypt's future ulama attended the Islamic University of Madinah in Saudi which was established as an alternative to the Egyptian government-controlled Al-Azhar University in Cairo. Muhammad Sayyid Tantawy, who later became the grand mufti of Egypt, spent four years at the Islamic University. Tantawy demonstrated his devotion to the kingdom in a June 2000 interview with the Saudi newspaper Ain al-Yaqeen, where he blamed the "violent campaign" against Saudi human rights policy on the campaigners' antipathy towards Islam. "Saudi Arabia leads the world in the protection of human rights because it protects them according to the sharia of God."

Saudi funding to Egypt's al-Azhar center of Islamic learning, has been credited with causing that institution to adopt a more religiously conservative approach.

=== Algeria ===
Political Islam and salafist "Islamic revivalism" became dominant and the indigenous "popular" or Sufi Islam found in much of North Africa greatly weakened, in large part because of the 1954-1962 Algerian War—despite the fact the victorious National Liberation Front (FLN) was interested in socialism and Arab nationalism, not political Islam.

Diminishing indigenous Islam was the dismantling of Sufi mystical brotherhoods and the confiscation and redistribution of their land in retaliation for their lack of support for the FLN during the fight against the French. Strengthening revivalism was a campaign of Arabization and Islamization by the government (FLN) to suppress the use of the French language (which was still dominant in higher education and the professions), to promote Algerian/Arab identity over residual French colonial culture. To do this Egyptians were recruited by the Algerian state to Arabize and de-Frenchify the school system. Like Saudi Arabia, Algeria saw an influx of Egyptian Muslim Brotherhood members hired to teach Arabic and eager to escape government suppression. While the leftist FLN Algerian government was totally uninterested in Islam as a foundation for conducting worldly affairs (as opposed to building a national identity), the Muslim Brotherhood teachers very much were, and many of the generation of "strictly Arabphone teachers" trained by the Brothers adopted the beliefs of their teachers and went on to form the basis of an "Islamist intelligentsia".

In addition, in the 1980s, as interest in Islam grew and devotion to the ruling National Liberation Front (FLN) party and secular socialism waned in Algeria, the government imported two renowned Islamic scholars, Mohammed al-Ghazali and Yusuf al-Qaradawi, to "strengthen the religious dimension" of the "nationalist ideology" of the FLN. This was less than successful as the clerics supported "Islamic awakening", were "fellow travelers" of the Muslim Brotherhood, supporters of Saudi Arabia and the other Gulf monarchies, and had little interest in serving the secularist FLN government.

Also in the 1980s, several hundred youth left Algeria for the camps of Peshawar to fight jihad in Afghanistan. As the FLN government was a close ally of the jihadists' enemy, the Soviet Union, these fighters tended to consider the fight against the Soviets a "prelude" to jihad in Algeria.

When the FLN followed the example of post-Communist Eastern European government and held elections in 1989, the main beneficiary was the massively popular Islamic Salvation Front (FIS) political party which sought to establish sharia law in Algeria. "Islamist intelligentsia" formed its leadership, FIS second in command, Ali Belhadj, was a state school teacher and a prime example or this. The Saudis supporting the party, and the Front's other co-leader Abbassi Madani received much aid from Saudi Arabia and other oil monarchies. (This did not prevent him from coming out in support of Sadam Hussein—along with most other Islamists—when Saddam invaded Kuwait, despite the adamant fear of and opposition to Saddam Hussein by the Gulf oil states.)

After the FLN saw how unpopular it was and canceled the elections, a bloody civil war broke out. The Salafist-jihadis returning to Algeria supported the FIS and later provided military skill in the Armed Islamic Group of Algeria (GIA).

The Algerian Civil War ended badly with an estimated 200,000 Algerians, many of them civilians, killed. FIS did not recover from the war, but by 2002 another strict/conservative Islamic force—Salafism—began to emerge. To end the war, the government needed help disarming the Islamists fighters and were able to enlist the Salafis—apolitical and nonviolent—as a religious counterweight and to use their religious influence to persuade the Islamists to stop fighting. In return the government has shown tolerance towards the Salafis. Culturally, as of 2010 Salafis have exerted "a growing influence over society and how people dress, deal with the state and do business" in Algeria. Their putative quietism notwithstanding they have protested a government plan to make women remove their headscarves for passport photographs, pressuring shopkeepers to stop selling tobacco and alcohol. In June 2010, a group of Salafist clerics attending an official function along with the minister of religious affairs showed their rejection of modern political systems as an illegitimate innovation or "bid‘ah" by refusing to stand for the national anthem. Salafist Sheikh Abdelfettah Zeraoui explains criticism of Salafism as the work of Western powers who have pressured Muslim governments "to crack down on the Salafi current because it represents the pure Islam." The Salafis connection with Saudi Arabia includes Saudi Grand Mufti, Sheikh Abdul-Aziz al-Sheikh who has endorsed opposition to international regulations requiring photographs for passports show a person's forehead and ears even if they are a woman. Abdelmalek Ramdani—the most prominent Salafist imam in Algeria—lives in Saudi Arabia, and prominent Salafist preachers—including Ali Ferkous, Azzedine Ramdani and Al Eid Cherifi—received religious training in Saudi Arabia.

=== Nigeria ===
The Izala Society—a Salafi missionary group established 1978—has become one of the largest Islamic societies in Nigeria, Chad, Niger, and Cameroon. Izala is funded by Saudi Arabia and led by the World Muslim League. It fights what it sees as the bid’a, (innovation), practiced by the Sufi brotherhoods, specifically the Qadiri and Tijan Sufi orders. It is very active in education and Da‘wa (propagation of the faith) and in Nigeria has many institutions all over the country and is influential at the local, state, and even federal levels.

As per Joshua Meservey of the Hudson Institute, who quantifies the rise of Salafism in Africa by basing himself on diverse scholarship, when it comes to West Africa in particular, in Ghana and Burkina Faso Salafis are said to represent more or so half of the country’s urban Muslim population, in Cameroon around 10% of Muslims are Salafis with numbers going up to 20% in some regions, while in Lagos, Nigeria’s largest city, as of 2014 some 60% of the youth was said to be Salafi.

== Central Asia and Caucasus ==
Scholar Vitaliĭ Vi͡acheslavovich Naumkin argues that even before the fall of Communism, Saudi Arabia had substantial influence on Islam in Central Asia because of its prestige as the location of the holy places of Hejaz, its financial resources and because of the large number of Central Asian pilgrims (and their descendants) who had gone to Saudi on hajj and decided to stay.

During the Soviet–Afghan War, thousands of Soviet Central Asians were drafted into the Soviet Army to fight their co-religionists (and sometimes fellow ethics), the Afghan Mujahideen. As Islam and Central Asian peoples had been repressed by the Soviets—often brutally—many were "deeply affected by the dedication" of their putative enemies. "Hundreds of Uzbek and Tajik Muslims travelled secretly to Pakistan and Saudi Arabia to study in madrasahs or to train as guerrilla fighters against the Soviets in Afghanistan." Many of these were influenced by the idea of armed jihad taught at Deobandi madrasahs in Pakistan where "places specifically for Central Asian radicals, who arrived without passports or visas and received a free education and a living allowance." Salafism also made headway with the help of Saudi funding and Saudi-trained preachers. In the late 1980s, at the same time as the Soviets were starting to withdraw from Afghanistan there was "an explosion of interest" in Islam in Central Asia. "Thousands of mosques were built, Qurans and other Islamic literature were brought in from Saudi Arabia and Pakistan and distributed free among the population."

In Central Asia the label "Wahhabism" has evolved from its original meaning of followers of Muhammad ibn Abd al-Wahhab, to become 'agitprop invective' and a ‘polemic foil in sectarian arguments' used by authoritarian governments against Islamic "reformists and ‘troublesome Muslim opponents’", or even against "any and all expressions of nontraditional Islam’. They tend to equate "Wahhabism" with local Sufi-influenced traditional religious culture.

=== Afghanistan ===
Saudi and Islamist forces helped the Afghan Mujahideen in their struggle against the Soviets, with Saudi Arabian government providing approximately $4 billion in aid to the mujahidin from 1980 to 1990. Saudi Arabia and other Arab states of the Persian Gulf became "important backers" for Islamic schools (madrassas) for Afghan refugees in Pakistan which appeared in the 1980s near the Afghan-Pakistan border. In 1988, the Muslim World League stated that it had opened 150 Quran study centers and 85 Islamic schools for Afghan refugee students in Peshawar, a short distance across the border in Pakistan.

Many were radical schools sponsored by the Pakistan JUI religious party and became "a supply line for jihad" in Afghanistan. According to analysts the ideology of the schools became "hybridization" of the Deobandi school of the Pakistani sponsors and the Salafism supported by Saudi financers.

Many of the Taliban were graduates of these schools. (Eight Taliban government ministers came from one school, Dar-ul-Uloom Haqqania.) While in power from 1996 to 2001, the Taliban implemented the "strictest interpretation of Sharia law ever seen in the Muslim world."

After the Taliban came to power the Saudis helped them in a number of ways. Saudi Arabia was one of only three countries (Pakistan and United Arab Emirates being the others) officially to recognize the Taliban as the official government of Afghanistan before the 9/11 attacks, (after 9/11 no country recognized it). King Fahd of Saudi Arabia “expressed happiness at the good measures taken by the Taliban and over the imposition of shari’a in our country," During a visit by the Taliban's leadership to the kingdom in 1997.

According to Ahmed Rashid, "Wahhabi" practices might have influenced the Deobandi Taliban. One example was the Saudi religious police, according to Rashid.

`I remember that all the Taliban who had worked or done hajj in Saudi Arabia were terribly impressed by the religious police and tried to copy that system to the letter. The money for their training and salaries came partly from Saudi Arabia.`

The Taliban also practiced public beheadings common in Saudi Arabia. Ahmed Rashid came across ten thousand men and children gathering at Kandahar football stadium one Thursday afternoon, curious as to why (the Taliban had banned sports) he "went inside to discover a convicted murderer being led between the goalposts to be executed by a member of the victim's family."

Another activity Afghan Muslims had not engaged in before this time was destruction of statues. In 2001, the Taliban dynamited and rocketed the nearly 2000-year-old statues Buddhist Bamiyan Valley, which had been undamaged by Afghan Sunni Muslim for centuries prior to then. Mullah Omar declared "Muslims should be proud of smashing idols. It has given praise to Allah that we have destroyed them."

=== Uzbekistan ===
The leadership of the Islamic Movement of Uzbekistan (IMU) has been influenced by the Salafi and Deobandi traditions. IMU head, Juma Namangani, (who was killed in November 2001) was indirectly influenced by outside Islamic revival when serving in the Soviet army in Afghanistan fighting Afghan mujahideen. He was radicalized by the experience and returning to his home in the Fergana Valley wanting to fight on the side of the Islamic revival not against it. He associated with local Islamists of the Islamic Renaissance Party (IRP) and the local Islamic revolutionary party Adolat (transl. Justice), and became a founder of the Islamic Movement of Uzbekistan. In 1995, Namangani traveled to Saudi Arabia to undergo "religious and intelligence training from Saudi intelligence".

According to journalist Ahmed Rashid, the IMU

is believed to have been funded by Saudis, Pakistanis, Turks, Iranians, and Osama bin Laden. Namangani was one of the most important “foreign Taliban” commanders in northern Afghanistan during the recent fighting there. He led a pan-Islamic force of Uzbeks, Tajiks, Pakistanis, Chechens, and Uighurs from Xinjiang province in China. They fought on the side of the Taliban in Afghanistan, but their long-range goal was to establish an Islamic state throughout Central Asia.

=== Caucasus ===
Salafi proselytising has been particularly successful in the ex-Soviet Muslim-majority areas such as Dagestan and Chechnya for a number of reasons, according to Robert Bruce Ware.

- Salafi funding, institutions, and missionaries are particularly useful because they fill the gap left by the collapse of the USSR, where traditional Islamic leaders were relatively unknowledgeable, and accustomed to surviving by subservience;
- Salafiyya fills the ideological void left by the collapse of socialism;
- the Salafi adversarial role toward the non-Muslim government (i.e. Russia's) fills the traditional role of Islam toward the Russian government and
- it takes advantage of public resentment against the existing corrupt and incompetent governments which traditional Islamic leaders are tainted by;
- advocacy of sharia law and organized Salafi enforcement of it plays into the desire for protection against post-Soviet criminal predation and the arbitrary brutality of the police.

Azerbaijan

Although 85% of Azerbaijanis are members of the Shiite branch of Islam, (which Salafis strongly oppose), and Muslims in Azerbaijan have a tradition of secularism, Salafism has made headway among the 15% of the country that identify themselves as Sunni Muslims and primarily inhabit the northern and western regions, specifically those of Dagestani ethnicity (Avars, Lezgins, Tsakhurs, Rutuls) in areas bordering Dagestan.

Salafism was proselytized and catalyzed starting with the dissolution of the Soviet Union by missionaries and funds from Arab countries such as Kuwait and Saudi Arabia, and Salafists mainly from Chechnya and Dagestan. In 1997, the Azerbaijani branch of the Kuwaiti Revival of Islamic Heritage society, built the Abu Bakr mosque in Baku, the capital. It became "one of the most successful mosques" in Azerbaijan, with 5000 people typically attending Friday prayer (compared to 300 for an average Azerbaijan mosque) and the "myriad" of social opportunities it provided created an "attractive network for its relatively young believers," and was "a great impetus for the Salafi movement". Its Imam for many years (Gamat Suleymanov) was a graduate of the Islamic University of Madinah of Medina Saudi Arabia.

Chechnya

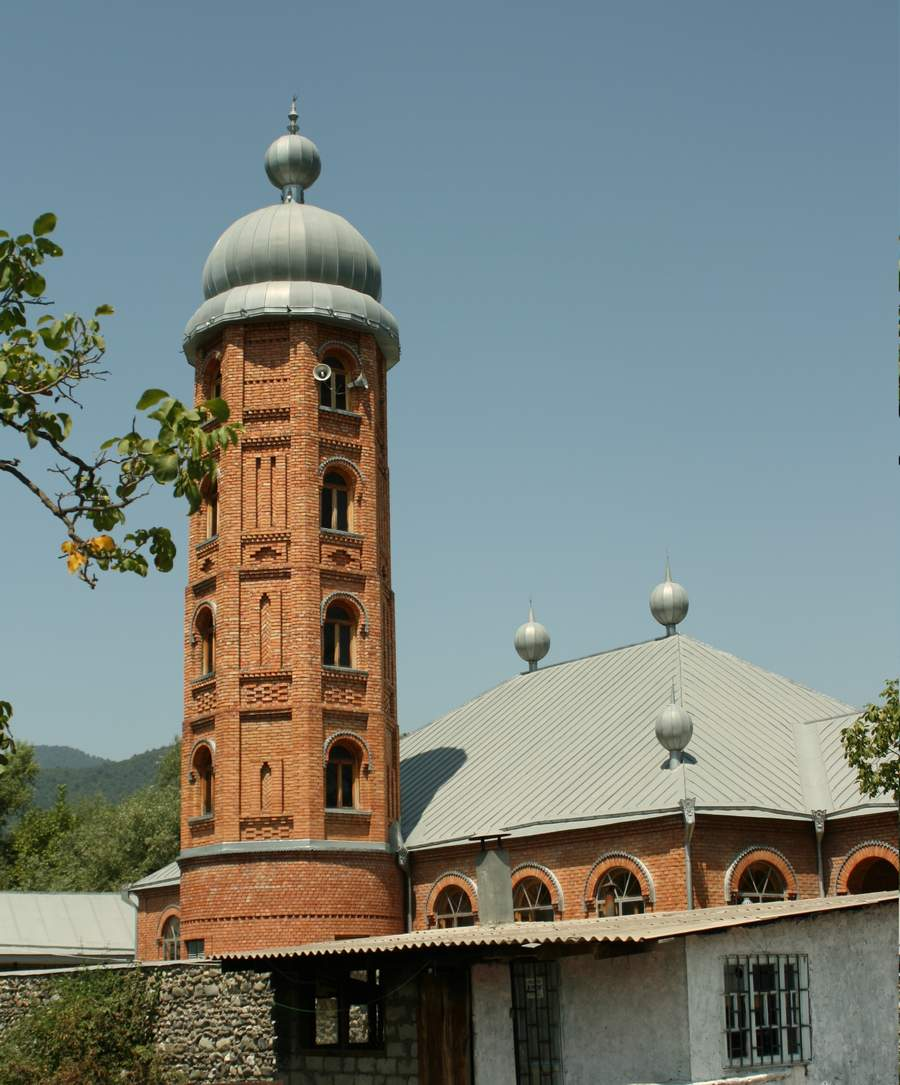
Wahhabi Mosque in Duisi, Pankisi Gorge, Georgia

Chechen leader Ramzan Kadyrov has said, that the spread of Salafism must be contained noting the need to, "crack down on the ideology of Wahhabism" in mosques, on TV, on social networks, through mobile devices.

Dagestan

An Islamist insurgency in the North Caucasus is "particularly intense" in Dagestan. As of 2011, Suicide bombers were killing an average of three policemen per week, with numerous civilians also becoming casualties. From January to June 2011, Police claimed to have killed 100 "rebels" according to Russian Interior Ministry officials.

Georgia

Although Georgia is predominantly Christian, it has Muslim minorities. In the Pankisi Gorge, home to the Kists, a small Muslim ethnic group, the older generation of Sufis is gradually giving away to younger Salafis who "scorn" the old practices and pray in "new, gleaming mosques". Wahhabi missionary activism entered into "a dozen Pankisi villages in the 1990s, popularized by young people educated in Arab countries". (The "Wahhabis" do not use the term but rather identify as Salafis.) According to a 2015 report, "a year ago, about 70 per cent" of the younger generation were Salafis and "now almost 90 per cent of them are."

== South Asia ==
Salafi missionary activism is also occurring in South Asia through the funding of mosques, Islamic schools, cultural institutions and social services. With "public and private Saudi funding", Salafi da'wa has "steadily gained influence among Muslim communities" in South Asia since the late 1970s, "significantly" changing "the nature" of South Asian Islam, and bringing an increase in "Islamist violence" in "Pakistan, Indian Kashmir, and Bangladesh". According to Jammu and Kashmir Police and Indian Central intelligence officers, in 2005 the House of Saud approved a $35-billion (Rs 1,75,000 crore) plan to build mosques and madrassas in South Asia.

=== Bangladesh ===
Bangladesh has the forth or fifth largest population of Muslims of any country and about a 30% poverty rate. Since the late 1970s, Saudi Arabia has funded the construction of thousands of mosques and madrasas in Bangladesh. Deobandi Hefazat-e-Islam, controls over 14,000 mosques and madrasas where up to 1.4 million students get an Islamic education without any state supervision.

Bangladesh also receives a concession from Saudi on the price of oil imports. With the concession has come changes in religious practices, according to Imtiyaz Ahmed, a religious scholar and professor of International Relations at University of Dhaka, "Saudi Arabia is giving oil, Saudi Arabia would definitely want that some of their ideas to come with oil." The Mawlid, the celebration of the Prophet Muhammad's birthday and formerly "an integral part of Bangladeshi culture" is no longer popular, while black burqas for women are much more so. In Saudi Arabia Mawlid is officially ignored, while for women in public places all-covering black (or similar dark color) hijab is required.

One way conservative Saudi religious practices are spread is through schools. Nearly 6 million Bangladeshi children attend schools at (private) Qawmi madrassas. Unlike regulated state schools these madrassas are free and entirely supported by private donations, which come from both inside and outside Bangladesh. (Note: A report examining "the political consciousness of madrassa teachers and graduate students in Bangladesh," found that 70 of 77 respondents at madrassas replied Saudi Arabia when asked "Which country is the best friend of Bangladesh?") Qawmi madrassas syllabus follows "orthodox Islamic teaching", being "restricted to study of Hadith and Tafsir-e-Quran (understanding and interpretation of Hadith and Quran) with emphasis on aspects of Jihad"

One burka-wearing Bangladeshi told the DW journalist who interviewed Imtiyaz Ahmed that she started wearing a burqa because at her son's school (a Qawmi madrassas) "the teachers scold the students whose mothers don't wear burqas. So, I asked my nephew who works in the Middle East to get me one." While rising crime and desire to feel safe are factors in the popularity of burkas, religious pressure is also.

=== India ===
Between 2011 and 2013, 25,000 Saudi clerics arrived in India with $250 million to build mosques and universities and to hold seminars. There is concern regarding the increasing Saudi-Wahhabi influence in the North West and in the East of India.

According to Saudi diplomatic cables released by WikiLeaks in 2015, 140 Muslim preachers are listed as on the Saudi Consulate's payroll in New Delhi alone.

In the Indian union territory of Jammu and Kashmir (part of Indian-administered Kashmir that has been the site of the Indo-Pakistani War of 1947, the Indo-Pakistani War of 1965, the 1999 Kargil War, and the ongoing insurgency), 1.5 of the 8 million Muslims affiliated to Salafism. The Saudi-funded Jamiat Ahl-e-Hadith has built 700 mosques and 150 schools in JK and claims that 16 percent of Kashmir's population are members. Police in Jammu and Kashmir believe this is the result of a $35 billion plan approved by Saudi Arabia's government in 2005 to build mosques and madrassas in South Asia.

=== Maldives ===
In the late 1990s, with the growth of Salafi missionary activities in Maldives, the local-traditional practices of Islam in the Maldives were getting challenged. After the 2004 tsunami, Saudi funded preachers gained influence. Within a short period of a decade fundamentalist practices dominated the culture. It is reported that Maldives has a, "growing Wahhabist majority and an autocratic government . . . or, according to the Maldivian opposition, a pliant ally where few questions are asked and fewer are allowed". In 2017, Members of the Maldivian Democratic Party have raised concerns that the decision by the government of President Abdulla Yameen to "sell" one of Maldives 26 atolls, to Saudi Arabia will aggravate Salafi preaching in the Maldives.

According to Azra Naseem, a Maldivian researcher on extremism at Dublin City University, “you can't say all of Salafism is radical Islam, but it's a form of Islam that's completely brought into the Maldives from Saudi Arabia and other places. Now, it's being institutionalized, because everybody in the universities, in the Islamic Ministry, they are all spreading this form of Islam.” In April 2017, Yameen Rasheed, a liberal blogger and "a strong voice against growing Islamic radicalization", was stabbed to death "by multiple assailants". According to a study by the Soufan Group, the islands supply 200 fighters to extremist outfits in Syria and Iraq—the world's highest per-capita number of foreign fighters.

=== Pakistan ===
Pakistan has the third largest Muslim population in the world and approximately 30% of its people living below the poverty threshold. Over decades, Saudi has spent billions of dollars in Pakistan, while the $ billions in remittances from the almost one million Pakistanis living and working in Saudi Arabia (as of 2010) are a vital source of income for Pakistan. Many of the madrassas funded through Gulf finances support Deobandi and Salafi interpretations.

According to a Pew Research Center survey, Pakistanis hold the most favorable perception of the desert kingdom in the world, with 95 percent Pakistanis surveyed viewing Saudi Arabia favorably. Support is also high for strict/traditional Islamic law favored by Saudi rulers in Pakistani opinion polls — stoning as punishment for adultery (82%), whippings and cutting off of hands for crimes like theft and robbery (82%), death penalty for those who leave the Muslim religion (76%). A major source of Salafi missionary impact in Pakistan has been through the Pakistani religious parties Jamiat Ulema-e-Islam (F) (Jamaati Ulama Islam before 1988), Jamiat Ahle Hadith and in particular the Jamaat-e-Islami. Saudis have helped fund Jamaat-e-Islami's educational networks since the 1960s. The party has been active in the Saudi-founded Muslim World League and "segments of the party "came to accept Wahhabism." The constituent council of the Muslim World League included Abul A'la Maududi (founder of Jamaat-e-Islami).

With the help of funding from Saudi Arabia and other sources, thousands of religious schools (madrasses) were established during the 1980s in Pakistan, usually Deobandi in doctrine and often sponsored by Jamaati Ulama Islam. "This rapid expansion came at the expense of doctrinal coherence as there were not enough qualified teachers to staff all the new schools. Quite a few teachers did not discern between tribal values of their ethnic group, the Pushtuns and the religious ideals. The result was an interpretation of Islam that blended Pushtun ideals and Deobandi views, precisely the hallmark of the Taliban." Another source describes the madrasses as combining Deobandi ideology with Salafism. Saudi Arabia provides much of the school funding. Critics (such as Dilip Hiro) complained of intolerance teachings as reflected in the chant at the morning student assembly at certain radical madrassas: "When people deny our faith, ask them to convert and if they don't destroy them utterly."

Another complaint about religious schools leading to extremism comes from a 2008 US diplomatic cable released by WikiLeaks concerning southern Punjab (specifically the Multan, Bahawalpur, and Dera Ghazi Khan Divisions there),

government and non-governmental sources claimed that financial support estimated at nearly $100 million USD annually was making its way to Deobandi and Ahl-e-Hadith clerics in the region from "missionary" and "Islamic charitable" organizations in Saudi Arabia and the United Arab Emirates ostensibly with the direct support of those governments.

But the diplomat complained many of the students ended up in terrorist training camps.

The network reportedly exploited worsening poverty in these areas of the province to recruit children into the divisions' growing Deobandi and Ahl-eHadith madrassa network from which they were indoctrinated into jihadi philosophy, deployed to regional training/indoctrination centers, and ultimately sent to terrorist training camps in the Federally Administered Tribal Areas (FATA).

One militant who has fought for Salafi Islam in Pakistan is Sufi Mohammad. Originally an activist of Jamaat-e-Islami (JI), he fought in the Afghan jihad and founded Tehreek-e-Nafaz-e-Shariat-e-Mohammadi (Movement for the Enforcement of Islamic Law) in 1992. Described as an ardent Salafist who has "remained associated with Saudi-sponsored groups from the Afghan theater of 1980-88", he was imprisoned on January 15, 2002, but the group has gone on to bomb girls schools, video and CD shops, and the statues of Buddhas in Bamiyan. It has also forced the closure of some development organizations, accusing them of spreading immorality by employing female staff. Other scholars argue that outside influences are not alone in generating sectarianism and jihadist violence in Pakistan, which has roots in the country's origins in the partition of India in 1947.

== Southeast Asia ==
=== Brunei ===
Saudi Arabia is strengthening its links with Brunei particularly relation to its Islamic-status and its oil-leverage in the region.

=== Indonesia ===
Since 1980, Saudi government, individual Saudis, and Saudi religious foundations and charities has devoted millions of dollars to exporting Salafism to Indonesia, the world's largest Muslim country, historically religiously tolerant and diverse. It has built more than 150 mosques (albeit in a country that has about 800,000), a huge free university in Jakarta, and several Arabic language institutes; supplied more than 100 boarding schools with books and teachers; brought in preachers and teachers; and disbursed thousands of scholarships for graduate study in Saudi Arabia. Kuwait, and Qatar have also "invested heavily" in building religious schools and mosques throughout Indonesia. Salafi radio stations, TV channels and website in Indonesia (and Southeast Asia) have undergone a "rapid rise". The conservative funding sources are eager to strip traditional Indonesian Islam of local customs containing elements of Hindu ritual and Sufi mysticism.

Saudi influence began around 1988, when President Suharto, encouraged a Saudi presence in Indonesia. The "primary conduits" of Saudi Islamic funding in Indonesia are the Dewan Dakwah Islamiyah Indonesia (the Indonesian Society for the Propagation of Islam, or DDII founded in 1967) and Lembaga Ilmu Pengetahuan Islam dan Arab (the Institute of Islamic and Arabic Studies, or LIPIA, a branch of the Imam Muhammad ibn Saud Islamic University in Riyadh Saudi Arabia). The Saudi embassy's Religious Attache Offices provides scholarships for students to go to Saudi Arabia and pays for "Attache preachers" to give Friday Khutbah sermons "across Indonesia" as well as Arabic teachers. The LIPIA, an all-expenses paid Salafist university in Jakarta, has produced tens of thousands of graduates since its founding in 1980. h

Both affluent and poor schools, in both Java and more remote islands are beneficiaries of Saudi largess. As of 2016, the number of "pesantren" (religious boarding schools) following the Salafi manhaj (path) had grown to about 100. The libraries of other pesantren — including the prestigious Gontor pesantren in East Java — are filled with books from Saudi Arabia. The Saudi religious affairs office in Jakarta provides about one million Arabic religious books translated into Indonesian every year. The titles include "Questions and Answers about Islamic Principles," by Bin Baaz, one of Saudi Arabia's most venerated interpreters of Islam. As of 2003, a pew poll found Crown Prince Abdullah, was rated as one of the three leaders Indonesians trusted the most.

As Salafism has expanded, some Indonesia have become alarmed at what they call the "arabization" of their country and called for an Islam with freedom of opinion and tolerance, that does not reject pluralism and democracy. A graduate of LIPIA (Farid Okhbah) helped found the National Anti-Shia Alliance (ANNAS) of Indonesia. Although Shia make up only about 1% of the population of the country, Okhbah has called Shia Islam a bigger threat to Indonesia than communism in the 1960s and urged the sect be banded.

According to Sidney Jones, the director of the Institute for Policy Analysis of Conflict in Jakarta, Saudi influence “has contributed to a more conservative, more intolerant atmosphere,” and may be behind campaigns against Shia and Ahmadi Islam, but very few of the Indonesians arrested on terrorism charges in Indonesia since 2002, have any ties to Salafi institutions.

However, according to a 2003 article in The New York Times, Saudis have also discreetly provided funds for "militant Islamic groups". The Saudi foundation Al Haramain financed educational institutions with the approval of the Indonesian Ministry of Religion, and "served as a conduit" for money to Jemaah Islamiyah, a Southeast Asian Islamist organization that aims to build Islamic states in the region and has bombed many civilian targets. (The spiritual guide of Jemaah Islamiyyah (Abu Bakar Bashir) has now pledged his allegiance to ISIS.)

On 4 November 2016 approximately 500,000 demonstrators gathered in central Jakarta, Indonesia's capital city, shutting down all the city's major arteries in the largest Islamist demonstration in Indonesian history and a political "turning point" in the nation's history. Led by Muhammad Rizieq Shihab of the Islamic Defenders Front (FPI), whose connections with Saudi Arabia "date back three decades", the demonstrators called for the rejection of "the leaders of infidels,” referring to Basuki Tjahaja Purnama ("Ahok") the Chinese-Christian governor of Jakarta. When Shihab asked the crowd, “If our demands are not heard, are you ready to turn this into a revolution?” they screamed their affirmation. Ahok was later sentenced to two years in prison for blasphemy, and in the next presidential election, candidates "played up their Islamic credentials" to appeal to the new political trend.

During an APEC meeting with Australia's new prime minister, Malcolm Turnbull, President Obama shared his observations on Indonesia's gradual shift away from a relaxed, syncretic Islam toward a more rigid, fundamentalist stance—noting, for instance, how widespread the hijab had become among Indonesian women. When Turnbull pressed him on the root cause of this transition, President Obama attributed it to extensive financial backing from Saudi Arabia and other Gulf states, which funded influxes of imams and teachers. He explained to Turnbull that throughout the 1990s, heavy Saudi investment poured into Wahhabist madrassas to promote the fundamentalist doctrine championed by the Saudi monarchy.

=== Malaysia ===
In 1980 Prince Muhammad al-Faysal of Saudi Arabia offered that Malaysia $100 million for an interest-free finance corporation, and two years later the Saudis helped finance the government-sponsored Bank Islam Malaysia. In 2017 it was reported that Salafi doctrines are spreading among Malaysia's elite, and the traditional Islamic theology currently taught in Government schools is shifted to a Salafi view of theology derived from the Middle East, particularly Saudi Arabia.

== Other regions ==
=== Australia ===
Australia has approximately 600,000 Muslim among its population of about 25 million. Within Australia, Saudi funds have used to build and/or operate mosques, schools, charities, a university and Australian Islamic institutions, with estimates up to US$100 million. This funding has generated tensions between Australian Muslim organizations. In 2015, it was uncovered by WikiLeaks that the Saudi Government has provided finance to build mosques, to support Islamic community activities and to fund visits by Sunni clerics to counter Shiite influence.

=== Canada ===
Canada has approximately one million Muslim out of a population of 35 million. Among the institutions in Canada Saudis have funded include mosques in Ottawa, Calgary, Quebec City. In Toronto, the Salaheddin Islamic Centre was funded by King Fahd of Saudi Arabia himself with a "US$5 million capital grant" and a further "US$1.5 million per year for operations", according to author Lawrence Solomon. According to the National Post the Salaheddin Islamic Centre received substantial funding from donors in Saudi Arabia, Qatar and the UAE in 2009 and 2010. One of the founders of the centre (Hassan Farhat), left Canada to join an al-Qaeda-linked group in Iraq, where he allegedly commanded a squad of suicide bombers. The centre's imam (Aly Hindy) is known for his "controversial comments" on homosexuality and Canadian law, and for refusing to sign a statement condemning the 2005 London bombings.

According to a report in The Globe and Mail, the Saudi government has donated hundreds of thousands of dollars to private Islamic schools in Canada. Saudi diplomatic cables from 2012 and 2013 disclosed by WikiLeaks contain conversations "about a $211,000 donation to a school in Ottawa and $134,000 to a school in Mississauga", according to the report. (The schools confirmed that they had sought the donations to help expand their facilities but denied the money came with conditions.)

=== New Zealand ===
New Zealand has approximately 46,000 Muslims out of a population of 4.6 million. In Christchurch (the largest city on New Zealand's South Island) the local mosque was "funded largely from private Saudi sources". As of 2006 the management the mosque's association (the Canterbury Muslim Association or MAC) is "commonly labelled ‘Wahhabi’ by its opponents" (following "serious and sometimes well-publicised divisions since the early 1990s", stemming from issues including interpretation of Islamic practice). In 2003 it sought "to turn the mosque property over to a trust dominated by the Saudi al-Haramain Foundation in return for money to establish a school, and still evidently wants to establish some sort of a trust". (Note: Investigate Magazine also writes that in November 2003, the al-Haramain Foundation was reported to be attempting to set up an organisation in New Zealand to establish an Islamic school and an "Islamic Bank" in a proposal involving "millions of dollars".)

From 2006 to 2013, conservative Islamic preachers associated in some way with Saudi Arabia or Salafiyya da'wa—such as Bilal Philips, Sheikh Khalid Yasin, Siraj Wahhaj, Yahya Ibrahim—held workshops in mosques and university student halls "up and down New Zealand". The conservative Investigate Magazine complains that works by some of the preachers include books that urge "followers to kill Jews, Christians, pagans and Hindus".

Islamic youth camps were held in 2001 on the North Island (at the Kauaeranga Forest Education Camp on the Coromandel Peninsula), where the "theme" was the restoration of the Islamic caliphate ("The Khilafah and man's role as Khalifah"); and on the South Island (Muslim students camp near Mosgiel) where the theme was ‘Islam is the Solution’ (a slogan of the Muslim Brotherhood). The Saudi supported World Assembly of Muslim Youth held a 10-day Intensive Islamic course for "more than 300 brothers and sisters" in 2003.

In November 2016 Mohammad Anwar Sahib, Imam of At-Taqwa mosque in New Zealand's largest city, Auckland, and a religious advisor for the Federation of Islamic Associations of New Zealand (FIANZ), created controversy when he was videoed saying, "The Christians are using the Jews, and the Jews are using everybody, because they think that their protocol is to rule the entire world....", in a speech at the mosque. In reply he stated that his statement was taken out of context and demanded an apology. He was later terminated as Secretary for the Ulama Board of the FIANZ.

In January 2017 Taie bin Salem bin Yaslam al-Saya'ari, a Saudi citizen who is "believed to have lived and studied in New Zealand between 2008 and 2013" and become radicalized there, was killed by Saudi security forces. Bin Yaslam al-Saya'ari is thought to have planned a July 2016 attack on the mosque where the Prophet of Islam Muhammad is buried (Al-Masjid an-Nabawi) which killed four Saudi security force members. He is said to have been inspired by another student studying in New Zealand who went to Syria to fight for the Islamic State and was also killed.

=== United States ===
In the US, where Muslims make up an estimated 1% of the population, Saudi Arabia funds, at least in part, an estimated 80 percent of all mosques. According to an official Saudi weekly, Ain al-Yaqeen, Saudi money helped finance 16 American mosques. According to Yvonne Haddad, (a professor of the history of Islam at the Georgetown center), records of the Muslim World League show that during a two-year span in the 1980s, the League spent about $10 million in the United States on mosque construction. The Saudi royal family directly contributed to the construction of a dozen mosques, including the $8.1 million King Fahad Mosque in Culver City, California.

The Saudi embassy's "Department of Islamic Affairs" was founded in 1982 and was directed by Prince Muhammad ibn Faysal ibn Abd al-Rahman for many years. At its height in the late 1990s, the department had 35-40 diplomats and an annual budget of $8 million according to a Saudi official contacted by author Zeyno Baran. The department provided regular financial support "to radical mosques and madrassas (religious schools)" in the United States, "including several attended by the 9/11 hijackers and otherwise linked to terrorist activities" according to author Harry Helms.

As in the UK and some other countries, universities in America have received funding from petroleum exporting Muslim states. Harvard and Georgetown universities both received $20 million in 2005 from a Saudi businessman (Prince Alwaleed bin Talal bin Abdulaziz Alsaud). Other Saudi gifts reportedly included $20 million to the Middle East Studies Center at the University of Arkansas; $5 million to the Center for Middle East Studies at the University of California, Berkeley; $11 million to Cornell University in Ithaca, New York and a half million dollars to University of Texas; $1 million to Princeton University; $5 million to Rutgers University. Academic chairs for Islamic Studies were donated at Harvard Law School and the University of California Santa Barbara. Islamic research institutes at American University (in Washington), Howard University, Duke University, and Johns Hopkins University were supported by the Saudis. These donations to academia have been described as aimed more at influencing Western public opinion than Muslims. Donors (such as Saudi Prince Alwaleed Bin-Talal) have described them as intended to "promote peace and help bridge the gap between East and West"; Critics (primarily Western political conservatives such as Daniel Pipes) believe they are incentive for "Middle East researchers, instructors and center directors" in Western countries to "behave" and "say the things the Saudis like" in exchange for large donations.

== See also ==
- Capitalism and Islam
- History of Islam
  - Spread of Islam
- Islam and other religions
- Islam and violence
  - Islam and war
  - Islamic terrorism
  - Jihad
    - Jihadism
- Islam in Saudi Arabia
  - International propagation of Salafism and Wahhabism
  - Petro-Islam
  - Salafi movement
    - Salafi jihadism
  - Wahhabism
- Islamism
- Islamic fundamentalism
- Islamic schools and branches
  - Persecution of minority Muslim groups
  - Shia–Sunni relations
    - Iran-Saudi Arabia conflict
  - Sufi–Salafi relations
- Muslim World League
- Political Islam
  - Political aspects of Islam
