= Farha =

Farha or Farhah (Arabic: فَرْحَة, farḥah) is an Arabic unisex given name and a surname, meaning "delight, pleasure, luckier, good luck, good fortune". The name is a variant of the name Farhat and also stems from the name Farah. Notable persons with that name include:

== People with the given name ==
- Farha Khatun, Indian editor and documentary filmmaker
- Farha Manzoor (born 1975), Pakistani politician who was a Member of the Provincial Assembly of the Punjab
- Farhah Al-Shamrani (born 2006), Saudi Arabian footballer
- Farha Nasim (born 1993), Indian dentist

== People with the surname ==
- Leilani Farha, Canadian lawyer and UN administrator, advocate of housing as a human right
- Makhoul Farha (born 1959), Lebanese Melkite Greek Catholic archbishop
- Omar Farha, American chemist and professor
- Sam Farha (born 1959), Lebanese poker player

== See also ==
- Farah
- Farhat
- Farhan
- Farha (film)
