= Muayyed Nureddin =

Iraqi-born Canadian geologist who was imprisoned and tortured

Muayyed Nureddin (مؤيد نورالدين) is an Iraqi-born Canadian geologist who was imprisoned and tortured in Syria after being arrested in December 2003. After a public inquiry in 2008 and then pursuing a civil litigation for nearly ten years, in July 2017, Nureddin and two other torture victims settled their claims with the Canadian government.

== Life ==
Muayyed Nureddin was born in Iraq, and worked as a geologist in Canada after migrating there.

In 1996, Nureddin offered to drive Mahmoud Jaballah, a new Egyptian immigrant, around the city if necessary, as he was a newcomer without transportation, but the two never became friends.

Nureddin was approached by the Canadian Security Intelligence Service (CSIS) in 2000, and interviewed.

On September 16, 2003, Nureddin boarded his flight at Pearson International Airport towards Amsterdam, intending to travel from there on to Iraq to visit family. He was questioned by a pair of CSIS officials for 45 minutes prior to departure, and asked about the amount of money he was carrying with him, and whether he knew Aly Hindy, Hassan Farhat or Subghat Allah Rasul. He flew to Amsterdam, and then to Iraq, without incident.

== Arrest and imprisonment ==
On December 11, 2003, Nureddin left Iraq towards Damascus, Syria where he had booked a flight home to Toronto. However he was detained at the border and turned over to Syrian Military Intelligence. It was at their hands that he claims to have been tortured and beaten with cables, and asked the same questions that CSIS had asked him in Toronto. His experience was similar to that of Maher Arar.

On January 13, 2004, Nureddin was released and met by the Canadian consul in Syria, Leo Martel, who was waiting in the offices of Syrian General Khalil. Nureddin met with the Canadian ambassador, and was flown home by Martel the following day; and was questioned by Martel about what had happened in the prison. He was later questioned again by CSIS agents Mike Boehm and Ian Ferguson.

== Inquiry ==
Nureddin reported being beaten and interrogated about his connection to a Toronto Islamic school, and called for a public inquiry into the role of Canadian officials in his detention.

In 2006 the Canadian government initiated an independent inquiry to determine the facts leading to his detention in Syria. As of 9 January 2008, the Commission of Inquiry continued to hear arguments about procedural matters and "standards of conduct", before starting hearings into the substantive matters of concern to the inquiry and participants. Attention was paid to the fact that Arar had already returned to Canada and denounced Canadian involvement in the Syrian prison; prior to Nureddin's being arrested and sent under identical circumstances to face the same Syrian interrogators.

Frank Iacobucci released his report in 2008 and concluded that Nurredin "suffered mistreatment amounting to torture" while in Syrian detention and that deficient information sharing by CSIS and the RCMP "likely contributed" to his detention in Syria.

On June 18, 2009, the Canadian House of Parliament voted in favour of an official apology and compensation to Almalki, el-Maati and Nureddin.

== Compensation ==
In July 2017, Nureddin and two other torture victims settled their claims with the Canadian government, receiving a total settlement of CA$31 million.
