= Farhan =

Farhan or Farhaan is an Arabic masculine given name which means "happy, joyful, blessed, delightful, rejoicing, merry, inclined to hopefulness". The name is the male variant from the female stem given name Farah, and is widely used in West Asia, North Africa and South Asia. It is a variant of Farhang and Ferhan as well. Notable people with these names include:

== Given name ==
=== Farhaan ===
- Farhaan Behardien (born 1983), South African cricketer
- Farhaan Faasil, stage name of Ismail Fazil (born 1990), Indian actor in Malayalam cinema
- Farhaan Sayanvala (born 1997), South African cricketer
- Farhaan Ali Wahid (born 2006), English footballer

=== Farhan ===
- Farhan, Emir of Loheia, Emir of Loheia
- Farhan Al-Aazmi (born 1994), Saudi Arabian footballer
- Farhan Adil (born 1977), Pakistani cricketer
- Farhan Ally Agha (born 1975), Pakistani politician, film, television, and voice actor
- Farhan Ahmad (born 1994), Pakistani athlete
- Farhan Ahmed (born 1988), Pakistani-Emirati cricketer
- Farhan Ahmed (English cricketer) (born 2008), English cricketer
- Farhan Akhtar (born 1974), Indian film director, screenwriter, producer, actor, playback singer and television host
- Farhan Asghar (born 1980), Pakistani cricketer
- Farhan Ayub (born 1985), Pakistani first-class cricketer
- Farhan Abu Bakar (born 1993), Malaysian footballer
- Farhan Baqai, American researcher
- Farhan Chishti, Pakistani politician
- Farhan Farhan (born 1996), Bahraini swimmer
- Farhan Ganie (born 1995), Indian footballer
- Farhan Hadafo (born 1996/97), Somali-Italian para-athlete
- Farhan Hairoddin (born 1989), Singaporean footballer
- Farhan Halim (born 2001), Indonesian volleyball player
- Farhan Jassim (born 1957), Iraqi freestyle wrestler
- Farhan Ahmed Jovan (born 1992), Bangladeshi television and film actor and model
- Farhan Jubouri (died 2013), Iraqi intelligence officer
- Farhan Khan, multiple people
- Farhan Lalji, Canadian sports reporter
- Farhan Ahmed Malhi (born 1992), Pakistani actor, model, and video jockey
- Farhan Malik (born 1995), Canadian cricketer
- Farhan Hassan Al-Mansour (died 2026), Syrian Shia cleric
- Farhan Mehboob (born 1988), Pakistani squash player
- Farhan Nizami, South Asian historian
- Farhan al-Qadi (born 1972), Israeli-Bedouin kidnapped during the October 7 attacks
- Farhan Roslan (born 1996), Malaysian footballer
- Farhan al-Sa'di (1862–1937), Palestinian rebel commander and revolutionary
- Farhan Saeed (born 1984), Pakistani singer-songwriter and actor
- Farhan Saleh (born 1947), Lebanese writer and militant
- Farhan Shafiq (born 1999), Pakistani cricketer
- Farhan Shakor (born 1995), Iraqi footballer
- Farhan Shubailat (1911–1979), Jordanian ambassador and politician
- Farhan Zaidi (born 1976), Canadian-American baseball executive of Pakistani descent
- Farhan Zakhil (born 2003), Afghan cricketer
- Farhan Zaman (born 1992), Pakistani squash player
- Farhan Zulkifli (born 2002), Singaporean footballer
