= Fareeha =

Fariha or Fareeha (Arabic: فَرِيحَة, farīḥah) is an Arabic and Urdu feminine given name meaning "happy". The name is a variant of Farih (فَرِح fariḥ), itself a variant of the name Farah. Notable persons with that name include:

== Given name ==
- Fareeha Fatima (born 1971), Pakistani politician
- Fareeha Jabeen (born 1967), Pakistani actress
- Fareeha Mehmood (born 1994), Pakistani cricketer
- Fariha Al-Ahmad (1944–2018), Kuwaiti royal
- Fariha al-Berkawi (died 2014), Libyan representative
- Fariha Fathimath (born 1987), Maldivian swimmer
- Fariha Razzaq Haroon (1956–2018), Pakistani politician and journalist
- Fariha al Jerrahi (born 1947), American art curator
- Fariha Pervez (born 1974), Pakistani singer
- Fariha Róisín (born 1990), Australian-Canadian writer
- Fariha Trisna (born 2002), Bangladeshi cricketer

=== Fictional characters ===
- Fareeha Amari, a character in the video game Overwatch

== See also ==
- Farah
