= Hassan Farhat (disambiguation) =

Hassan Farhat may refer to:

- Hassan Farhat, Iraqi imam
- Hasan Farhat (born 2004), Lebanese footballer
- Farhat Hassan Khan (born 1965), Pakistani field hockey player

== See also ==
- Hassan (given name)
- Farhat
