= Farah (name) =

- Gender: Female

Origin
- Origin: Arabic and Persian
- Meaning: Joy (Arabic) or glory (Persian)
- Region of origin: West Asia

Other names
- Variant forms: Fareeha, Farha, Afrah, Farhan, etc.

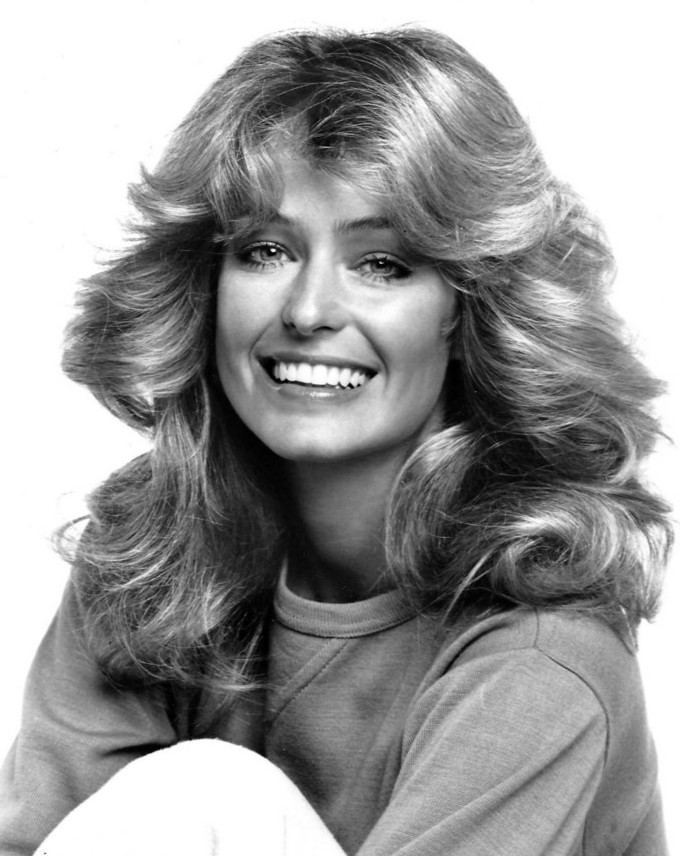
American actress Farrah Fawcett, who stated that her name (originally spelled "Ferrah") was chosen by her mother to flow well with her surname.

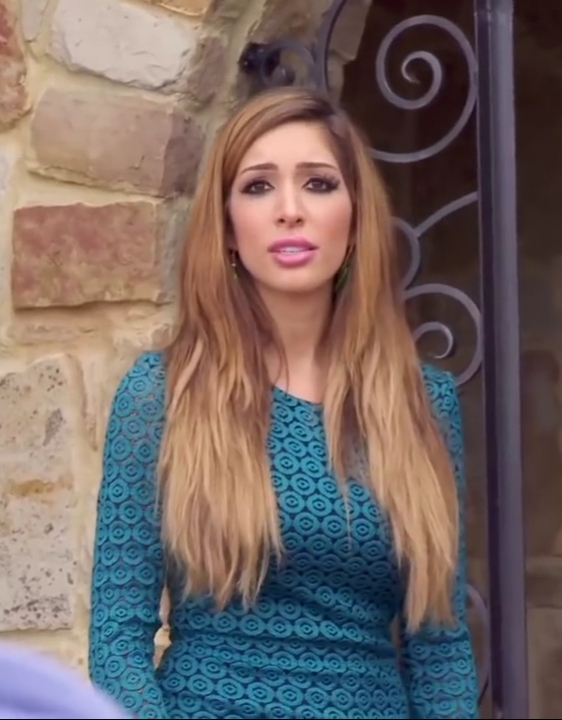
American television personality Farrah Abraham, whose father is part Syrian.

Farah is an Arabic- and Persian-language feminine given name meaning "joy" in the former and "glory" in the latter. The Arabic name is common across the Muslim world, while other varieties of the name have grown in popularity across the Anglosphere due primarily to the American celebrities Farrah Fawcett (1947–2009) and Farrah Abraham (born 1991); "Farrah" ranked among the top thousand names for newborn girls in the United States between 1976 and 1980, between 1987 and 1988, and between 2010 and 2016.

== Origin and meaning ==
=== Arabic ===
Farah (Arabic: فَرَح, faraḥ) is an Arabic female given name and sometimes male given name meaning "happiness, joy, gladness, gleefulness, joyful, joyfulness, merriment, rejoice"

The name is based on the Arabic root ف ر ح (f-r-ḥ), variants from the root are:

- Faruh/ Farouh (Arabic: فَرُوح, farūḥ) – male given name
- Farhat/ Farhaat (Arabic: فَرْحَات, farḥāt) – male given name (but the written form is in the female plural form), the female form below is Farhah.
- Farhan/ Farhaan (Arabic: فَرْحَان, farḥān) – male given name
- Afrah/ Afraah (Arabic: أَفْرَاح, afrāḥ) – female given name in the plural or superlative form
- Fariha/ Fareeha (Arabic: فَرِيحَة, farīḥah) – female given name
- Farhah (Arabic: فَرْحَة, farḥah) – female given name, the female form of Farhaat above
- Farhah/ Faarhah (Arabic: فَارْحَة, fārḥah) – gender-neutral form, uncommonly used
- Farah/ Faarah (Arabic: فَارَح, fāraḥ) – gender-neutral form, uncommonly used

=== Persian ===
Farrah/ Khwarrah (Pahlavi: xwarrah) or Khvaraenah (Avestan: (Farah salman),xᵛarənah), in Avestan or Pahlavi meaning 'glory'. The Avestan or Pahlavi word-name used in Zoroastrian texts or name and is completely different from the Arabic.

== Given name ==
=== Farah ===
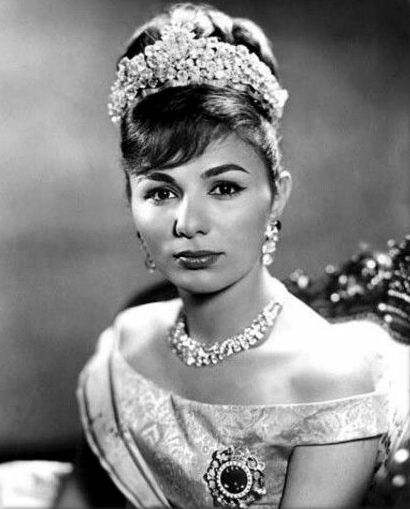
Farah Pahlavi

- Farah (actress), Indian actress
- Farah Zeynep Abdullah (born 1989), Turkish actress
- Farah Damji (born 1966), British criminal
- Farah Fath (born 1984), American actress
- Farah Guled (died 1845), 3rd Grand Sultan of the Isaaq clan
- Farah Hussein (born 2001), Egyptian gymnast
- Farah Ali Jama, Somali economist and politician
- Farah Jacquet (born 1985), Belgian politician
- Farah Khan (born 1965), Indian choreographer and director
- Farah Mendlesohn (born 1968), British academic
- Farah Nur (1862–1932), warrior and poet of the Isaaq clan
- Farah Pahlavi (born 1938), Iranian empress consort
- Farah Puteri Nahlia (born 1996), Indonesian politician
- Farah Shah (born 1972), Pakistani actress and host

=== Farrah ===
- Farrah Abraham (born 1991), American television personality
- Farrah Fawcett (1947–2009), American actress
- Farrah Franklin (born 1981), American singer
- Farrah Forke (1968–2022), American actress
- Farrah Hall (born 1981), American sports sailor
- Farrah Moan (born 1993), American drag queen and entertainer
- Farrah Yousef (born 1989), Syrian singer

== Surname ==
=== Farah ===
- Abdulrahim Abby Farah (1919–2018), Somali diplomat and politician
- Caesar E. Farah (1929–2009), American scholar and historian
- Cynthia Farah (born 1949), American writer and photographer
- Elias Farah (1928–2013), Syrian writer and thinker
- Elie Farah (1909–2003), Lebanese archbishop and priest
- Hassan Abshir Farah (1945–2020), Somali politician
- Joseph Farah (born 1954), American journalist and writer
- Kenza Farah (born 1986), French-Algerian singer
- Martha Farah (born 1955), American psychologist
- Mo Farah (born 1983), Somali-British track and field athlete
- Nuruddin Farah (born 1945), Somali writer
- Robbie Farah (born 1984), Australian rugby league footballer
- Robert Farah (tennis) (born 1987), Colombian tennis player

=== Farrah ===
- Abd'Elkader Farrah (1926–2005), Algerian painter and stage designer
- Georges Farrah (born 1957), Canadian politician
- John Farrah (1849–1907), British grocer, confectioner, biologist and meteorologist
- Pat Farrah, American retail executive
- Saleh Ali Farrah, Tanzanian politician
- Shamek Farrah, American saxophone player

== Fictional ==
- Farah, a character in the American television series Sleeper Cell, played by Sarah Shahi
- Farrah Maalik, a character from British soap opera Hollyoaks

== See also ==
- Pharah, a character in the Overwatch video game
