= Farhang =

Farhang (فرهنگ) means 'culture' in Persian. It may also refer to:

- Farhang (given name)
- Farhang (newspaper)
- Marzieh Farhang, Iranian physicist
