= Afrah =

Arabic female given name

Afrah or Afraah (Arabic: أَفْرَاح, afrāḥ) is an Arabic feminine given name and surname meaning "joyful, happiness, gladness, delight, pleasure, merriment, exhilaration", "high spirits, joy (delight) of the chest" and is also the literal word for "wedding". The name is the plural or the superlative form of the name Farah. Notable people with the name include:

== Given name ==
- Afrah Gomdi, Tunisian Paralympic athlete
- Afrah Nasser, Yemeni journalist
- Hussein Kulmiye Afrah (1920–1993), Vice president of Somalia 1969–1991
- Mohamed Afrah Qanyare (1941–2019), Somali warlord
- Muktar Hussein Afrah, Somali army officer

== Surname ==
- Abdullahi Afrah (1953–2008), Somali leader in the Union of Islamic Courts
- Abdulahi Ahmed Afrah, Somali politician
- Mohamed Afrah (1974–2019), Maldivian film actor
