= Kassim Mohamed =

Kenyan-Canadian Muslim

Kassim Mohamed is a Kenyan-Canadian Muslim who was detained by Egyptian officials after Canadian authorities reported he had been filming national monuments, city buildings, and subway stations.

== Life ==
Mohamed moved to Canada with his wife and daughter in 1990, and obtained citizenship in 1995 - at which point he had five children. He worshipped at the Salaheddin Islamic Centre in Scarborough.

== Questioned in Canada ==
After Mohamed and another man used a camcorder to film various details of the CN Tower (including fire exits) and the inside of the Bloor-Yonge subway station, he was questioned by two Royal Canadian Mounted Police (RCMP) officers the following day as he left the Tim Hortons across from his mosque. Constable Joseph Harris confirmed that the filming had been the impetus for their concern and investigation.

== Detained in Egypt ==
In May 2004, he boarded a flight bound for Cairo, Egypt and was questioned by Canadian officials at the airport as he departed. After his flight reached Athens, he was informed that he would have to deboard and return to Canada.

He was held for two weeks by Egyptian authorities, who questioned him.

== Lawsuit ==
Represented by lawyer Lorne Waldman, Mohamed announced he was suing the Canadian authorities.

In 2004, Imam Aly Hindy celebrated the 135th birthday of Mahatma Gandhi by organising a group of 100 local Muslims to videotape the CN Tower as part of a non-violent protest against the detention of Mohamed
