= Wafa Bughaighis =

Libyan diplomat and activist

Libyan Ambassador to the United States
- In office November, 2017 – August, 2021
- Succeeded by: Khaled Al-Sadeq Al-Daif (as chargé d'affaires)

Wafa Bughaighis is a Libyan diplomat, a peace and education activist with a particular concern on women as well as a chemical engineer. She was Libya's Ambassador to the United States from November 2017 until August 2021.

== Education ==
From 1978 to 1982 Wafa Bughaighis attended the American International School in Vienna, Austria. Later, she earned a Bachelor of Science in Chemical Engineering from the Catholic University of America in Washington, D.C. in 1987. She initially wanted to pursue her major in Nuclear Engineering, which was, however, banned by the U.S. government as a field of study for Libyan students in the 1980s. After obtaining her bachelor's degree, Bughaighis completed post graduate studies in Engineering Management and International Relations at George Washington University. She is fluent in Arabic and English and proficient in German.

== Career ==
Bughaighis started her professional life in 1988 at the Arabian Gulf Oil Company in Benghazi as a Chemical Engineering Specialist. She worked in the field for 14 years. Then she became Deputy Chairwoman at the Nour Al Maarif Education Company, beginning her career in the education area. In 2011, she served as Director of the International Collaboration Bureau of the Ministry of Education of Libya. The same year, Bughaighis chaired and co-founded the United Nations recognized "Commission to Support Women's Participation in Decision Making". Furthermore, since 2012, she has been a member of the Wilson Center's Global Women's Leadership Initiative in Washington D.C. Between 2013 and 2014 she was the Assistant Deputy Minister for Political Affair in the Libyan Ministry of Foreign Affairs and International Cooperation. In 2014, she was designed as Acting Foreign Minister in the Ministry of Foreign Affairs. Then she moved to Washington D.C. where she began her diplomatic career. Wafa Bughaighis was first Chargé D'Affaires for three years and in November 2017 she was nominated Ambassador. In August 2021 she was removed from her post as her term of office had expired in May 2021.

== Private life ==
Bughaighis' sister is Laila Bugaighis, a physician and human rights activist. Salwa Bughaighis, a human rights activist and her cousin, was assassinated in 2014. Her father was a general in the Libyan army under King Idris.

Wafa Bughaighis is married and has two daughters and a son.

== Conferences ==
- Women in democratic transitions in the MENA region - Global's Women Leadership Initiative (GWLI) and Wellesley Centers for Women with the partnership of the Ministry of Interior of Morocco
- Women waging peace: how to combat ISIS in Libya - John F. Kennedy Jr. Forum held in the Institute of Politics at the Harvard Kennedy School
- Global conversation: why UN must focus on women's leadership - sponsored by Women in Public Service Project at Barnard College
- Building peace in Libya: a conversation with Wafa Burgaighis - Carnegie, endowment for international peace
- The challenges of combating ISIS in Libya - Middle East Institute (MEI) at the SEIU Conference Center
- Economic and strategic challenges in Libya - Near East South Asia (NESA) Center
- Her Power - digital summit for Foreign Policy

== Publications ==
- Chapter "Prospect of women in the new Libya" from Handbook of Arab women and Arab Spring: challenges and opportunities (2013, Muhamad S. Olimat, ISBN 978-1-315-85866-1)
