= Mustafa Krer =

A Libyan-Canadian, Mustafa Mohammed Krer (also Abdel Salaam, El Faidl) left Libya in 1989, following the arrest of his brother al-Mukhtar Muhammad Krer. While living in Montreal, the Canadian Security Intelligence Service (CSIS) accused him of being a former leader of Libyan Islamic Fighting Group and he was arrested in Libya in 2002.

== Life ==
=== Association with Jaballah ===
Krer and Mahmoud Jaballah met through mutual friends, and Jaballah has said that he phoned Krer for helping finding Egyptian newspaper articles he felt could help his refugee claim, and that Krer occasionally visited Jaballah in Toronto. The only time they met in Montreal was when Krer met Jaballah and his wife at Hassan Farhat's apartment to celebrate the birth of a child. CSIS however says that Krer was "extremely conscious of communications security" and cautioned Jaballah against using the telephone too much.

Following Jaballah's arrest, he asked a friend to tell "Abu Dunia" not to visit him in detention and to keep a low profile; CSIS alleges this was a reference to Krer. On February 14, 1997, Krer spoke to a companion and referred to Hassan Farhat as a man with funds "for the cause".

== Return to Libya, arrest ==
In 2002, he travelled to Malta, where he received assurances from Libya that he was not under investigation and given a plane ticket home by the Libyan People's Bureau. On May 2, he arrived in Libya and was immediately arrested at Tripoli Airport and taken to 'Ayn Zara Prison.

In February 2004, he met with representatives from Amnesty International.

He was not granted access to a lawyer until 15 March 2004, when he appeared before the People's Court charged with affiliation to the Libyan Islamic Fighting Group. He was not given the choice of his attorney.

In December 2004, Canadian Foreign Affairs Minister Pierre Pettigrew and Libyan Prime Minister Shukri Muhammed Ghanem discussed the case.

The National Post and the American Libyan Freedom Alliance have both mistakenly claimed that he was deported from Canada, and that he was executed by Libyan authorities after he arrived in the country in 2002. In their 2008 report concerning Mahmoud Jaballah, CSIS mistakenly listed Krer as having been arrested on December 18, 2004, two years after his actual arrest.

== Interview with Aljazeera TV Channel ==
Mustafa Kere had an interview with Aljazeera, he explained how the Government of Canada collaborated with Colonel Qaddafi regime during his interrogation. this interview could be found here.
