= Laila Bugaighis =

Libyan physician and human rights activist

Laila Taher Bugaighis
- Arabic: ليلى بوقعيقيص
- Citizenship: Libya
- Education: Benghazi University
- Occupations: Physician, human rights activist
- Known for: Founder of National Protection Against Violence Committee
- Relatives: Wafa Bughaighis (sister); Salwa Bughaighis (cousin)

Laila Taher Bugaighis (Arabic: ليلى بوقعيقيص) is a Libyan physician and human rights activist.

She is the CEO and former deputy director general of the Benghazi Medical Centre, one of only two tertiary care hospitals in Libya. She is the founder and chair of the National Protection Against Violence Committee, a part of the National Transitional Council's Health Ministry. Bugaighis is also a member of the Scientific Committee for Reproductive Health of Libya, and co-founder of the political NGO Al Tawafuk Al Watani Democratic Organization.

== Biography ==
Bugaighis studied medicine at Benghazi University. She is a consultant obstetrician and gynecologist, and a member of the Royal College of Obstetricians and Gynaecologists. Also a women's rights activist, Bugaighis advocated against implementing a quota on the participation of women in Libyan politics, believing it would "reduce the chances of the right qualified women getting seats in parliament". She has called for greater legal protection of victims of domestic violence, access to abortion in cases of rape, and reform of the country's family law.

She is the sister of Wafa Bughaighis, the Libyan ambassador to the United States. Her cousin was Salwa Bughaighis, a Libyan human rights activist who was assassinated in 2014.

== Honours ==
She is a distinguished visitor at the O’Neill Institute for National and Global Health Law at Georgetown Law. She regularly gives speeches at universities in the United States.
