= Kassem Daher =

Kassem Daher (Arabic: قَاسِم ظَاهِر), born in Bekaa, Lebanon, is a Lebanese-Canadian accused of membership in a number of Islamic militant groups.

== Life ==
At the age of 14, Daher left Lebanon and moved to Columbia - before settling in Leduc, Alberta. In 1990 he purchased the local movie theatre, and four years later purchased the Capitol Theatre in nearby Ponoka.

Mahmoud Jaballah said that he frequently phoned a man he knew as "Mahmoud" who lived in Alberta, alleged by the Canadian Security Intelligence Service (CSIS) to have been Daher, to ask about conditions in the province, and exchanging tapes, books and similar publications. Jaballah also visited him in Winnipeg, and phoned him, Jaballah once phoned Hassan Farhat, telling him that Daher would appreciate any religious audiocassettes that they could send him. In July 1997, Jaballah suggested Daher contact Mabruk; who subsequently tried to convince Daher to distribute more pamphlets around Alberta. Jaballah and Daher ended their relationship by the end of the year.

Farhat and Daher also spoke to each other, with Farhat once being recorded on a wiretapped call saying he admired the religious scholar Omar Abdel Rahman so much that ""he puts the whole world on one scale and ‘the blind one’ on the other, because he was so precious".

He is alleged to have made a comment about publishing a book entitled "Terrorism Is a Duty and Force is an Obligation.".

== Return to Lebanon ==
Daher returned to his Lebanese hometown in May 1998.

On February 3, 2000, Daher and eight others were arrested in the Bekaa Valley, where he owns a mansion, following a clash with government troops. Accused of being a member of Takfir W' Al Hijra and assembling and equipping the group, Daher was released after two years and put under house arrest.

Daher is accused of ties to the Canadian Islamic Association, and using the name "Abu Zurr", to recruit American terrorist Jose Padilla to train in Al-Qaeda training camps.

On November 23, 2005, Daher, Padilla and one other were indicted by American authorities of allegedly fundraising and supplying support for Asbat al-Ansar,
