= Ferhan =

Ferhan is a Turkish unisex given name, which is derived from the Arabic masculine given name Farhan.
Notable people with the name include:

- Ferhan Azman, Turkish architect
- Ferhan Çeçen (born 1961), Turkish environmental engineer and chemist
- Ferhan Hasani (born 1990), Macedonian footballer
- Ferhan Önder (born 1965), Turkish-Austrian pianist
- Ferhan Şensoy (1951–2021), Turkish playwright, actor, and stage director
