= Salwa Bughaighis =

Libyan activist

Salwa Bugaighis
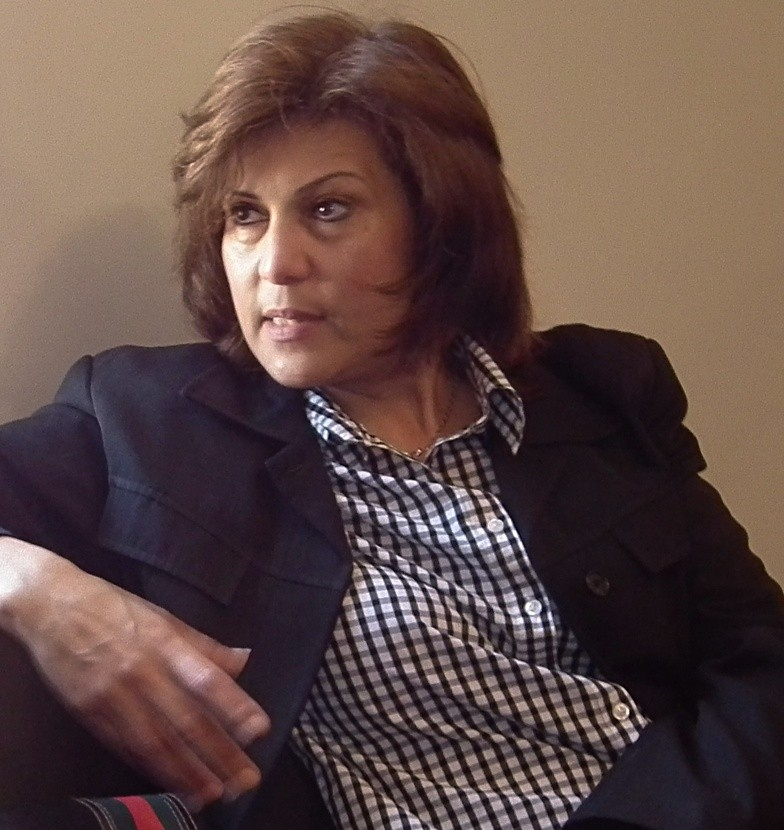
- Born: 24 April 1963
- Died: 25 June 2014 (aged 51); Benghazi, Libya
- Citizenship: Libyan
- Occupations: Lawyer, activist

Salwa Bugaighis (24 April 1963 – 25 June 2014) was a Libyan human rights and political activist. She was assassinated in Benghazi, Libya on 25 June 2014.

== Life and career ==
Bugaighis was from a prominent Benghazi family and trained as a lawyer at Garyounis University in Benghazi. In the years prior to the February 2011 revolution in Libya, Bugaighis defended the cases of a number of ex-political prisoners against the government of Muammar Gaddafi. She joined some of the first protests in Benghazi against Muammar Gaddafi in February 2011 with a group of lawyers and other civil society activists.

Bugaighis became a founding member of and adviser to Libya's National Transitional Council which governed the country during and after the uprising. Her sister, Iman, a professor of orthodontics, was the spokesperson for the Council. Salwa resigned her position after three months to protest against the absence of women in the new government and the lack of proper democratic practice in the council.

She also opposed moves to make the wearing of the hijab compulsory, and her views brought her into conflict with Islamist extremists.

Before her assassination, Bugaighis served as deputy chair of a National Dialogue Commission, a commission appointed by the then prime minister of Libya, Ali Zeydan, whose objective was to bridge Libya's factional divide. She was mentor to many civil-society activists, particularly young ones. She had updated Facebook with pictures of herself voting on the day she was killed.

== Assassination ==
On 25 June 2014, Bugaighis was shot multiple times in the back by a group of unknown, masked gunmen who broke into her house, wounding a security guard and abducting her husband, Essam al-Ghariani.

There was a very strong reaction to her murder. A large number of Benghazi women went out in the streets to protest this crime in the days following her death. Human rights activists and organizations have organized many events in her memory inside and outside of Libya, and she has become an icon of the fight for freedom and democracy in Libya. Fariha al-Berkawi, a member of the General National Congress who strongly condemned Bughaighis' death, was shot by a gunman at a gas station in Derna three weeks later, on 17 July 2014.

=== International reactions ===
The US Ambassador to Libya, Deborah Jones, said the killing was "heartbreaking". British ambassador Michael Aron tweeted "devastated about horrific murder" and called Bugaighis a "leading light of the 17 February revolution and human rights champion". US National Security Advisor Susan Rice, reflecting on meeting Bugaighis, said "I was deeply impressed by her courage, leadership and dedication to building a peaceful, democratic Libya where the rights and freedoms of all Libyan women and men are respected and protected."

== Personal life ==
Her family is known for its diversity and progressiveness. She had three sons. She was married to Essam al-Ghariani. Her cousins are Laila Bugaighis, a Libyan physician and women's rights activist, and Wafa Bughaighis, a peace and education activist and the former Libyan ambassador to the United States.
