= Mahmoud Jaballah =

Egyptian-Canadian accused of terrorism

Mahmoud Es-Sayyid Jaballah (Arabic: محمود جاب بالله) is an Egyptian who has been detained in Canada without charge on a "security certificate" since August 2001 due to his association with members of al-Jihad. He has consistently asserted that he does not believe in violence, and just because he phones or visits people, does not mean that he shares their beliefs.

== Life ==
While studying at the University of Zagazig in Egypt, Jaballah was involved in a student group named Badr which distributed pamphlets, a weekly periodical and arranged field trips for students. He stated that the University dean eventually expelled the professor who organised the group for his "anti-government political activity".

He was arrested in 1981 and accused of membership in al-Jihad and of participating in the assassination of Anwar Sadat, but was found innocent at trial. He was re-arrested in 1987 and again accused of membership in the group, but the court again found him innocent of all charges.

Jaballah left Egypt in July 1991 and worked in Pakistan from November 1991 through June 1994, first as a biology teacher and then as a school principal under the International Islamic Relief Organization. He has denied claims from the Canadian Security Intelligence Service (CSIS) that he also fought in Afghanistan and Chechnya.

He claims to have stayed in Azerbaijan from September 1995 through March 1996.

He married Husnah Mojammad El-Sayyed El-Mashtouli, with whom he has six children. She and four of the children have been granted refugee status in Canada.

== In Canada ==
Jaballah entered Canada on May 11, 1996 and applied for refugee status. He admitted that he was using a false Saudi passport, that had stamps indicating the bearer had traveled from Egypt to Saudi Arabia, entered Pakistan ten days before al-Jihad's attack on the Egyptian Embassy in Pakistan, and visited Yemen, Azerbaijan, Jordan, Turkey, and Germany successively. He stated that he had also used a false Iraqi passport in the past, in order to travel from Pakistan to Yemen, and from there to Azerbaijan, from 1994 to 1996. Muayyed Nureddin offered to drive him around the city if necessary because he was a newcomer without transportation, but the two never became friends.

By November 2006, he had arranged a postal box in the city [what city?], and registered [with whom and for what reason?] under the name Bellal. He was visited by CSIS agents shortly after arriving. His son maintains that the CSIS agents were upset because Jaballah refused to spy for them. The agency has denied that it attempted to recruit Jaballah.

=== Alleged associations ===
It troubles me that people I meet on the street, people I meet at school, people I meet at the mosque, I always wonder, "What is this person's beliefs, and will I be questioned about it one day?" You should be able to associate with people freely and not have to worry.

— Ahmed Jaballah, eldest son

The month after entering Canada, CSIS alleges Jaballah began phoning suspected al-Jihad members still living in Pakistan and spoke of acquiring new clothing, which Canadian authorities allege was a code word for travel documents. He also remained in contact with al-Jihad ruling council members Ahmad Salama Mabruk and Thirwat Salah Shehata, the latter had served as Jaballah's lawyer in Egypt and married Jaballah's sister. He denied any relationship with Mabruk.

In September, Jaballah was advised to use caution when contacting "the father", believed to be a reference to Ayman al-Zawahiri. He responded that he was usually contacted by the father, not vice versa. Two months later, he mentioned to Shehata that he hadn't heard from the father, but was assured that he was all right and just had some difficulties communicating recently. In a later phone call to Yemen, he asked a colleague to deliver a message to the father from him. In April 1997, Jaballah received a telephone call from the father who asked him how he was faring in Canada. Ten months later, he was given the number for an Inmarsat satellite phone to contact "Mohammed", which Canadians allege was a reference to Mohammed al-Zawahiri, and phoned it frequently.

In October 1996, al-Jihad's London leader Adel Abdel Bary contacted Jaballah to say that he was shipping him several books and periodicals, including al-Mujahideen and al-Faqr for distribution in Canada, and copies of the Shifaa and some audio cassettes he asked to be forwarded on to Shehata. He also offered to ship him a phone card printing machine to ensure he was able to easily communicate overseas.

In November 1996, Shehata, his brother-in-law told Jaballah that he was in Syria and preparing to go stay with "Daoud", believed to be a reference to Ibrahim Eidarous who was staying in Azerbaijan. That same month, he was informed by a friend that Mohammad Zeki Mahjoub had moved to Toronto, whom both had known in Afghanistan. He later met Mahjoub briefly while picking his wife up from the Khadr's house where Mahjoub was also visiting. Jaballah returned the greeting, introducing himself to Ibrahim by the kunya name Abu Ahmad and left. Although Mahjoub was found with the phone number of Jaballah's son at the time of his arrest, 289-2361 under the name Abu Ahmed ("Father of Ahmed"), Jaballah denied having ever spoken on the phone with him.

On December 13, Jaballah was informed that his friend "Najib" had been hospitalised, which authorities suggest was a reference to Ahmad Salama Mabruk being imprisoned along with Ayman al-Zawahiri and Mahmud Hisham al-Hennawi by Russian authorities as they tried to cross into Chechnya. Jaballah promised to raise funds in Canada to help Nijab while Shehata did the same in Azerbaijan. Hani Yusef al-Sebai contacted him at this time, explaining that he was staying near Shehata and helping with the fundraising for Mabruk's release. During one telephone call, Jaballah hung up abruptly on al-Sebai explaining he had security concerns and they should speak on his cell phone in the future. He contacted Eidarous on January 1 to ask how he would arrange a cash transfer from the British Bank Middle East to Azerbaijan under the name Khalil Yaseen Mohammed Mahmoud, and a few days later phoned Shehata to say he was unable to transfer the funds to him. Shehata told him to just send the funds for Mabruk's release to Daoud's postal box in London.

In September 1997, Bary was replaced by Ibrahim Eidarous as the leader of the London organisation, and Jaballah began phoning him instead, still referring to him as "Daoud", to discuss matters.

In July 1998, Jaballah phoned Ibrahim Ismail Allam and passed on a message Shehata had asked him to deliver. A month later, Shehata phoned Jaballah and told him that he'd moved to Lebanon, but didn't have a phone in his new location. He never again contacted Jaballah.

In the summer of 1998, following the bombings of two American embassies, Eidarous, Bary, al-Sebai, Khalid al-Fawwaz and Sayyid Ahmed al-Maqsud were among eight men arrested in London, England for their relationship with al-Jihad. Canadian authorities interviewed Jaballah on September 21 and again on the 26th to question him since he had phoned all five men. Jaballah said that he had read of the London arrests on the al-Hayat website but hadn't heard who specifically had been arrested. When shown a list of the arrested men's names in Arabic, he claimed to not recognise any of them, and when challenged retorted that perhaps he had known them by other names since he knew a lot of people overseas, but didn't recognise the names in front of him. He was asked to name everybody he'd contacted who lived overseas and give CSIS their telephone numbers. Jaballah refused. He further stated that the bombings were likely carried out by the Egyptian Intelligence Service to allow them to arrest those opposed to the regime. After the interviews, Jaballah phoned Eidarous and told him that Canadian authorities had asked about him, and even referred to him as Daoud.

He has since argued that he knew Bary due to his role as director of the International Office for the Defence of Egyptian People, and was seeking help preparing for his upcoming hearings before the Immigration and Refugee Board of Canada, although he admitted having contacted him a month after arriving in Canada, several months before he began preparing for his IRB hearing.

In 1998, Barakat Fahim Ali Mohamed was contacted by Jaballah, who wanted an immediate set of false documentation for himself and his family in case Canadian authorities declined his request for refugee status or pursued him. In October 1998, he asked Mohamed whether he had received the necessary photographs of his children and was disappointed to learn that he had not. In March 1999, Jaballah unsuccessfully tried to send Mohamed a fax with his address details, and phoned him repeatedly. He was told that "the thing" was ready for him, and would be sent out after Eid, assuming the fax had been received by then. He was given details about a Yemeni post office box where it is believed he sent money to pay for the fake identification. By the end of April, Canadian authorities allege that Mohamed sent a letter postmarked in Yemen and signed "Murad", which was addressed to "Bellal", but sent to Jaballah's postal box. It simply stated that the sender was sorry to have not heard from him since Eid, and that he hoped he would get in contact soon.

Jaballah has described a casual relationship with Ahmed Khadr, stating that his wife had gone grocery shopping with Khadr's mother-in-law, and he had thus invited Khadr into his house for fifteen minutes during which the two drank tea and discussed their respective relief work in Peshawar, Pakistan. He said his wife had bought the Khadr family groceries when Khadr came to Canada as a refugee. He said he met Khadr when he dropped by to pick up items being given to his family during a period of time when Khadr's family was in need and consistent with Muslim charity, he offered Khadr some tea. Jaballah has said that he never met Khadr while in Peshawar, though Khadr's sons Abdullah and Abdurahman have said that they had seen Jaballah around Peshawar and knew him as an Arabic tutor in the city who went by the patronymic Abu Ahmed. It was later claimed by the government that he had in fact taught the Khadrs while working as a teacher at two schools in the city, and that his wife had asked the family to deny any closer connection than what he'd previously mentioned to the authorities.

Jaballah and Mustafa Krer met through mutual friends, and Jaballah has said that he phoned Krer for help finding Egyptian newspaper articles he felt could help his refugee claim, and that Krer occasionally visited Jaballah in Toronto. The only time they met in Montreal was when Krer met Jaballah and his wife at Hassan Farhat's apartment to celebrate the birth of a child while Jaballah was in the city seeking cheaper car insurance than he could obtain in Toronto. Jaballah met Farhat in 1996 at the Medina Mosque in Toronto, and received help finding a local apartment and learning English. Farhat introduced Jaballah to Ali Hussein, and later moved to Winnipeg, Montreal and then back to Toronto. Jaballah also visited him in Winnipeg, and phoned him 41 times, once telling him that Kassem Daher would appreciate any religious audiocassettes that Farhat and Jaballah could send him.

=== Recruiting ===
In July 1997, a fax believed to have been sent by Mabruk, was sent to Jaballah offering advice on how to approach and recruit Canadians to al-Jihad. He sent a reply stating that he had already begun making contacts in the community, and had found several Muslim Brotherhood members whose loyalty he had "tested" and that he was convinced they were reliable friends. He was congratulated and reminded that al-Jihad could use as many brothers as they could find.

== Arrest ==
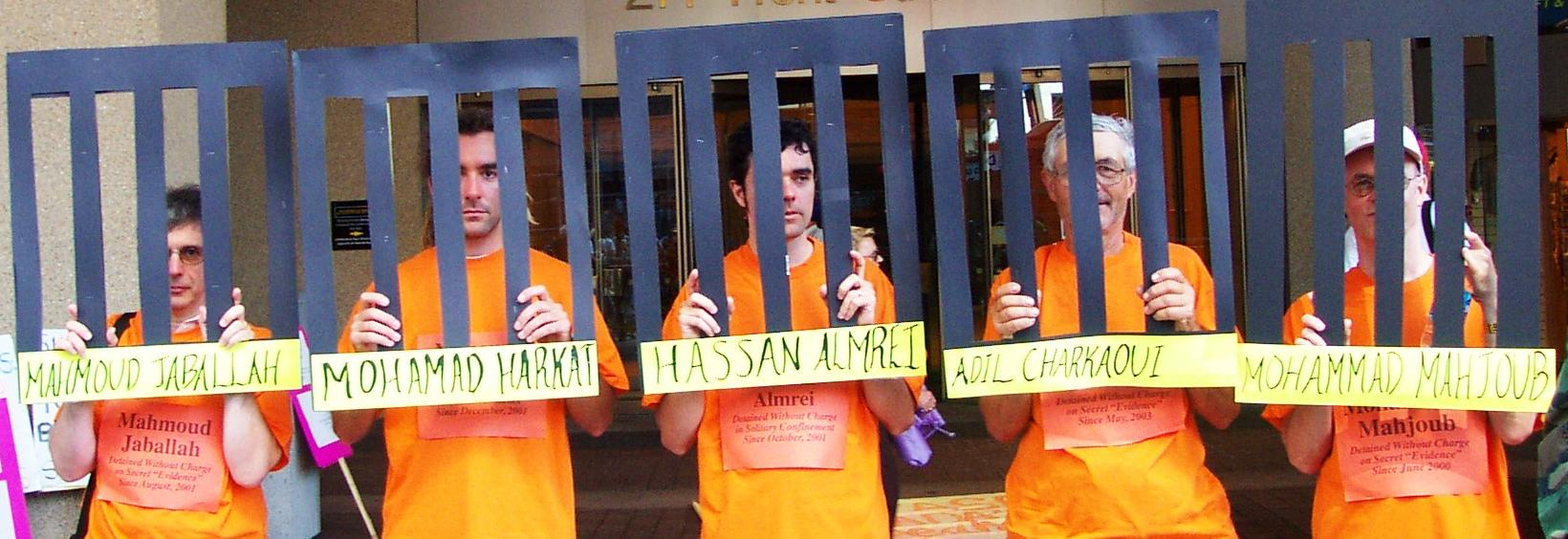
Mahmoud Jaballah is represented in a 2004 protest outside the Toronto office of CSIS.

Jaballah was arrested in 1999 on a security certificate alleging he was a key member of al-Jihad. The courts found the evidence unsatisfactory and he was released several months later. Islamic groups accused the Canadian government of bowing to pressure from Egypt to extradite Jaballah back for a third attempt to convict him of membership in al-Jihad.

In August 2001, Jaballah was arrested on a second security certificate. He was held at Toronto West Detention Centre until April 2006, when he and the other security certificate detainees were moved to a newly constructed facility two hours north of Toronto named Kingston Immigration Holding Centre.

In March 2002, his lawyer Rocco Galati made headlines when he simply walked out of the courtroom referring to the legal process holding Jaballah as "a travesty of justice" since security officials were meeting alone with the judge, and the accused was not allowed to know or challenge the evidence against him.

In October 2006, Jaballah's lawyers Paul Copeland and Barbara Jackman again sought bail, this time noting the support of former Iraqi hostage James Loney and the release of Mohamed Harkat on bail from a security certificate four months earlier.

== Release ==
On April 14, 2007, Jaballah was released on house arrest by judge Carolyn Layden-Stevenson, a day after Mohammad Zeki Mahjoub was similarly released and escorted to his family home. A CSIS agent identified only as J.P., the Deputy Chief of Counterterrorism and Counterproliferation in the Ottawa Regional Office as of 2005, testified against the petitions for release by Almrei, Jaballah and Charkaoui. Under the conditions of his release, Jaballah is not allowed to leave his house without approval, nor have visitors who haven't been cleared by security. His mail is opened and his phone is tapped, and he is prohibited from using a cellphone or internet connection.

In December 2007, security officials petitioned Layden-Stevenson to allow them to install 14 surveillance cameras inside the Jaballah home to watch the day-to-day activities of the family. When asked to review clandestine photographs the Canada Border Services Agency (CBSA) identified as his house, Jaballah "stunned the court" by appearing perplexed and answering that these were not even photos of his house. The agents had accidentally submit photos from the wrong stakeout, instead labeling photos of Tamil gang-leader Jothiravi Sittampalam's house as being the Jaballah residence, The court also noted complaints that Muslim women are only able to walk around without their niqab or hijab inside the home away from the eyes of strangers; and that federal agents would be intruding on their privacy.

The same month, it was discovered that despite the federal order barring the Jaballah household from access to the internet, the City of Toronto government had actually made Afnan Essayyid, one of Jaballah's high school-age daughters, the recipient of its Kids@Computers scholarship program meant to assist children living in welfare situations, and brought the family a free internet line. Jaballah had phoned Bell after the internet line was installed in the kitchen, and was told that the account was being set up and paid for by the city. Jaballah's lawyer John Norris questioned the city's agents in court, and was told that the CBSA had never mentioned anything about the scholarship program.

Ultimately, it was decided that Jaballah could not continue to teach at the Um Al Qura school he had founded in Scarborough, nor hold Arabic-language or Koranic classes at his home.

Following the release of information that CSIS had been illegally monitoring the privileged conversations between Mohammad Zeki Mahjoub and his lawyer, Jaballah and Mahjoub filed a joint motion alleging that the conditions of their house arrest were unreasonable; stating their tracking-bracelets, wiretapped phones and curfews were acceptable intrusions on their lives, while having their family photographed and physically followed at every opportunity and their mail seized were unreasonable. Judge Anne MacTavish ruled against this motion.

The Summary Report drafted by CSIS in 2008 had a number of demonstrable errors, including identifying Amr Hamed and Essam Marzouk as the same person, stating that four of Ahmed Khadr's sons had attended training camps when only two had, that Mustafa Krer was arrested on December 18, 2004, rather than May 2, 2002, and alternatingly referring to the same interview occurring on either August 21 or September 21.
