= Saeed and Masoud Rasoul =

Terrorist brothers

Saeed Sobrahatollah Muhammad Rasoul and Masoud Rasoul (born in Kurdistan) are Kurdistani-Canadian brothers who are alleged members of the terrorist group Ansar al-Islam. Former worshippers at Salaheddin Mosque, it is alleged they may have been recruited to fight in Iraq by Hassan Farhat. They went missing in northern Iraq in 2003.

The Rasoul brothers moved to Canada with their parents in 1990/91, and were granted Canadian citizenship before settling down in North York, Ontario.

Saeed is a graduate of Seneca College, and married Ibtisam Salahaddin Muhammad in 1995, the year she immigrated to Canada from Iraq. He promised her they would move back to her native Arbil when they had enough money. On August 20, 2002, the couple left Canada and brought their two children, likely through Syria, to a house they had recently purchased in the Iraqi city. Saeed then began applying for networking engineer jobs, putting in an application to join the United Nations Kurdistan field office.

On November 2, 2002, Ibtisam was stopped at a routine checkpoint on her way to Biara, where she told police that her husband was friends with Farhat and was working as a computer engineer for Ansar al-Islam. After the PUK labeled Saeed a "computer expert" who aided the militant group, his wife and two children were placed under house arrest by police chief Westa Hassan in Sulaymaniya in 2003. Her father then traveled to the mountain stronghold where Saeed was staying, and requested that he offer his daughter a proper divorce, which resulted in a letter being sent back stating "I have divorced you, and am marrying the jihad".

Their younger brother, Abdulla, said the family was "shocked and saddened" and that he didn't believe it was possible as his brother was a "cultural person".

Masoud's Canadian driver's license, SIN card and his Mountain Equipment Co-op membership card were found by American troops following an attack on an Ansar stronghold.

On March 7, 2005, Saeed and Hassan Farhat were named by CSIS Director Jim Judd in remarks to the Senate of Canada. He said that Farhat "is believed to be a key commander and ideologue with" Ansar al-Islam and that Saeed was "believed to be a member".
