= Farhan Khan =

Farhan Khan may refer to:

== People ==
- Farhan Khan (actor) (born 1983), Indian actor
- Farhan Khan (footballer) (2000/01–2024), Pakistani footballer
- Farhan Khan (Lahore cricketer) (born 1990), Pakistani cricketer
- Farhan Khan (Omani cricketer) (born 1975), Pakistan-born Omani cricketer
- Farhan Khan (Quetta cricketer) (born 1990), Pakistani cricketer
- Farhan Khan Rio (born 1984), Bangladeshi film actor and model
