= Abdulahi Ahmed Afrah =

Somali politician

- Occupation: Politician

Abdulahi Ahmed Afrah is a Somali politician who hails from the Waesle clan (an Abgaal subclan). In June 2007, he escaped an assassination attempt in northern Mogadishu.
