= Farhan Baqai =

Senior researcher at Apple Inc.

Farhan A. Baqai is a Senior Research Manager at Apple, working on camera technology. He was elevated to a fellow of the IEEE in 2023 for "contributions in leadership in digital camera image processing". He received his master's degree in electrical and electronic engineering from the University of Melbourne. A graduate of Purdue University, Baqai received his masters and doctoral degrees (electrical and computer engineering) in 1997 and 2000 respectively; his doctoral advisor was Jan Philip Allebach. In addition to his work at Apple, Baqai formerly worked for Sony and Xerox. His positions with these companies includes work on the iPhone, Mac, iPad and CyberShot cameras.
