= Farah Puteri Nahlia =

Indonesian politician (born 1996)

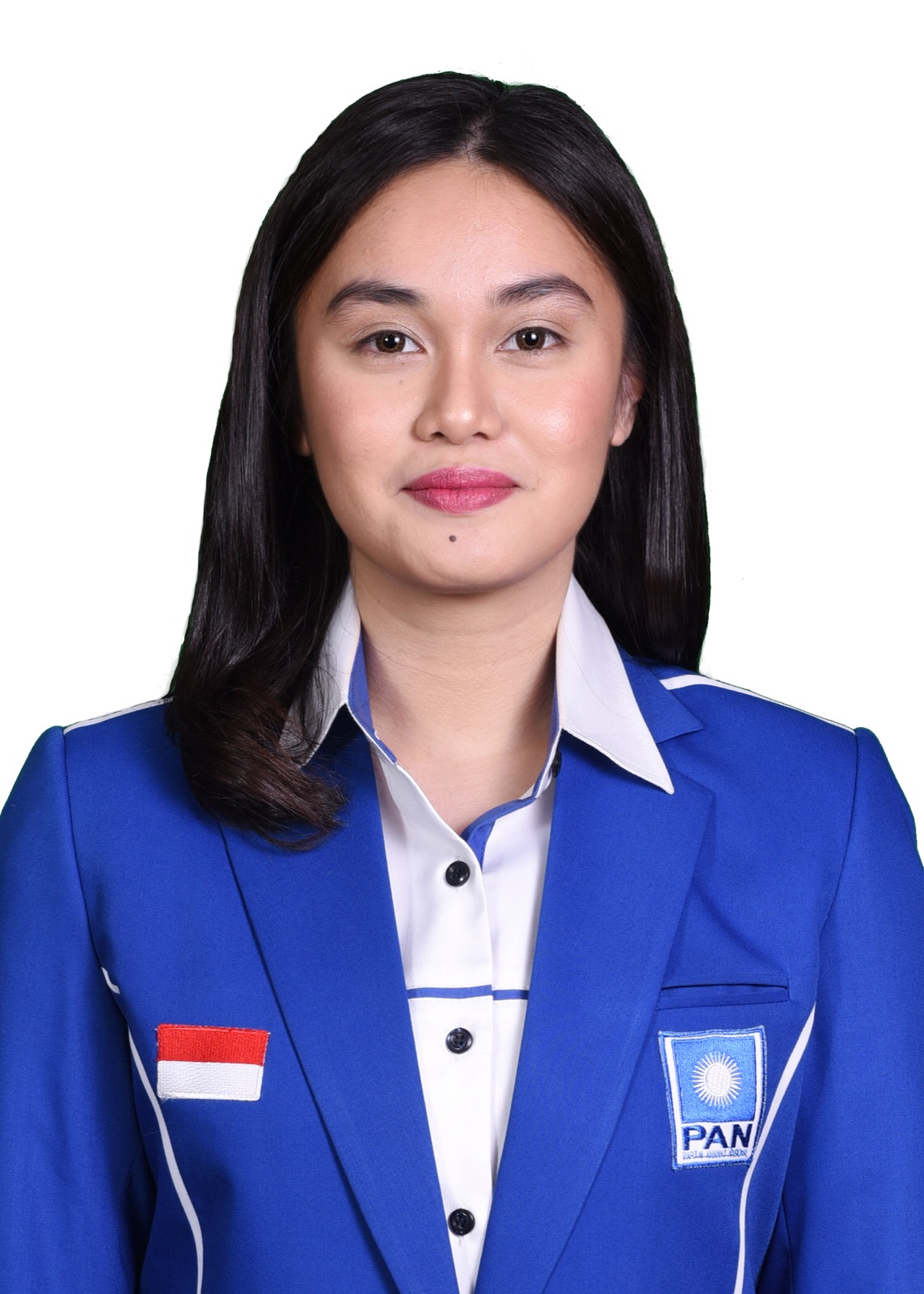
- Farah Puteri Nahlia in 2019

Member of the House of Representatives
- Incumbent
- Assumed office 1 October 2019
- Constituency: West Java IX

Personal details
- Born: 2 January 1996 (age 30)
- Party: National Mandate Party
- Parent: Muhammad Fadil Imran (father)
- Relatives: Sitti Husniah Talenrang (aunt); Firdaus Daeng Manye (uncle); Merdisyam (father-in-law)

Farah Puteri Nahlia (born 2 January 1996) is an Indonesian politician serving as a member of the House of Representatives since 2019. She has served as chairwoman of the women's wing of the National Mandate Party since 2025.
