= Fareeha Fatima =

Pakistani politician

Member of the Provincial Assembly of the Punjab
- In office October 2015 – 31 May 2018
- Constituency: Reserved seat for women

Personal details
- Born: 17 April 1971 (age 55) Faisalabad
- Party: Pakistan Muslim League (N)

Fareeha Fatima (Urdu: فریحہ فاطمہ; born 17 April 1971) is a Pakistani politician who was a Member of the Provincial Assembly of the Punjab, from October 2015 to May 2018.

== Early life and education ==
She was born on 17 April 1971 in Faisalabad.

She has completed matriculation level education.

== Political career ==
She was elected to the Provincial Assembly of the Punjab as a candidate of Pakistan Muslim League (N) (PML-N) on a reserved seat for women in October 2015.
