= Salaheddin Islamic Centre =

Mosque in Toronto, Ontario, Canada

Salahedin Islamic Centre
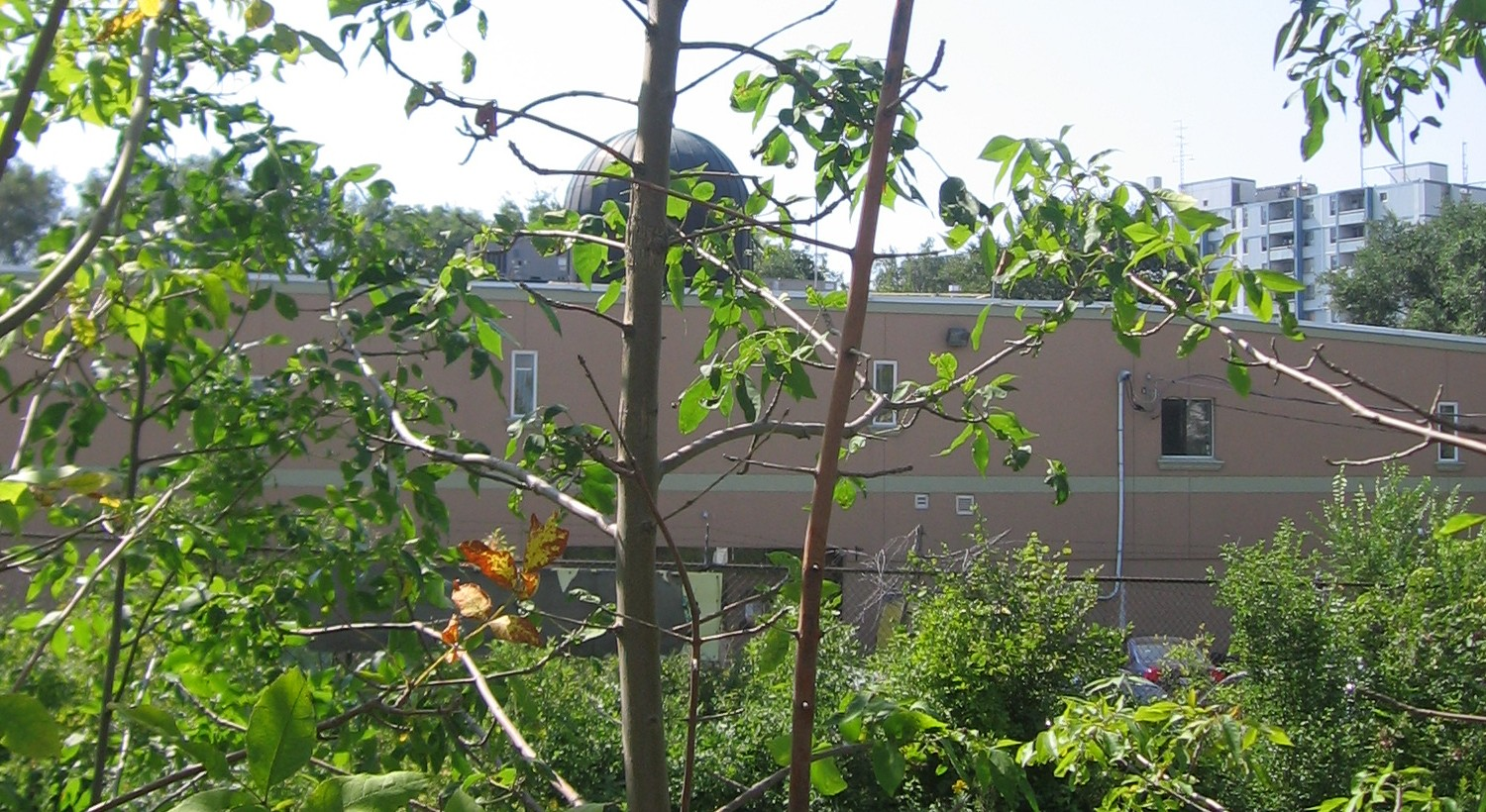

- Location in Toronto

Religion
- Affiliation: Islam
- Ecclesiastical or organisational status: Mosque
- Leadership: Imam Aly Hindy
- Status: Active

Location
- Location: 741 Kennedy Road, Scarborough, Toronto, Ontario M1K 2C6
- Coordinates: 43°43′51″N 79°15′58″W

Architecture
- Founder: Hassan Farhat
- Capacity: 2,500 worshippers

Website
- salaheddin.org

The Salaheddin Islamic Centre is a mosque located in the Scarborough Junction neighbourhood of the Scarborough district of the city of Toronto, Ontario, Canada. The mosque noted for its outspoken Imam Aly Hindy and alleged links to convicted terrorists.

== History ==
The mosque was founded by Imam Hassan Farhat.

Imam Aly Hindy took over the leadership of the Salaheddin Islamic Centre in 1997, and has since transformed the community from a small mosque to become a full centre with many facilities and programs. In addition to offering regular prayers, lectures and conferences, the Salaheddin Centre assists disadvantaged and destitute members of the Toronto community with a full-time elementary and high school, marriage and counselling services, a food bank, youth programs, and funeral services, along with other activities that seek to improve people's lives.

In 2020, the Salaheddin Islamic Centre opened new facilities for the Safa and Marwa Islamic School in Mississauga, financed with the support of the Islamic Development Bank. The US$6.6 million project enabled the purchase of a former office building and warehouse and convert into high school classrooms and associated facilities for 850 students.

=== Controversies ===
One of the mosque's founders was, now disgraced, Imam Hassan Farhat. However, he was made persona non grata by the mosque's administrators and forbidden to continue to hold any position at the facility. Permission was granted to Farhat to worship at the mosque.

A number of its worshippers have been accused of ties to terrorism, including Ahmed Khadr who ran a charity named Health and Education Project International that used to attend the mosque and allegedly funnelled money to Afghan training camps.

Brothers Saeed and Masoud Rasoul, whose father was a prayer leader at the mosque, later went missing in Iraq. He was believed to have fought for Ansar al-Islam, possibly at the urging of Farhat.

Following the 2006 Ontario terrorism plot, it emerged that Fahim Ahmad and a number of other suspects were members of the mosque.

During the 2008 bail hearing of Abdullah Khadr, where the mosque offered surety, Crown prosecutors attacked the credibility of the mosque. However, Judge Trotter dismissed the suggestion, referring to testimony from RCMP officer Tarek Mokdad who agreed it was not reasonable to suggest the mosque supported terrorism. The Court ruled:

"I accept that, over the years, there may have been persons, involved in questionable activities, with questionable associations, who have passed through the Centre from time to time. In my view, this in itself is not sufficient to taint the centre in any way."

— Ontario Superior Court of Justice, 2008.

== Notable members ==
- Fahim Ahmad, a convicted terrorist
- Steven Vikash Chand, convicted on conspiracy charges as part of the 2006 Ontario terrorism plot
- Hassan Farhat, a disgraced imam
- Aly Hindy, an imam
- Mahmoud Jaballah, a former school principal, detained without charge on a security certificate since 2001
- Members of the Khadr family, including Ahmed and sons, Abdullah, Abdurahman, and Omar, noted for their ties to Osama bin Laden and connections to al-Qaeda
- Saeed and Masoud Rasoul, alleged members of the terrorist group Ansar al-Islam

== See also ==
- Islam in Canada
- List of mosques in Canada
