= Fariha al-Berkawi =

Libyan politician

- Died: 17 July 2014
- Citizenship: Libyan
- Organization: Non-Islamist National Forces Alliance

Fariha al-Berkawi was a Libyan representative in the General National Congress who was assassinated on 17 July 2014.

== Career ==
Berkawi had been the representative for Derna District in the General National Congress. She was a member of the non-Islamist National Forces Alliance and a member of the budget committee.

== Death ==
Berkawi was shot by a gunman on 17 July 2014 at a gas station in Derna, three weeks after Salwa Bughaighis' assassination. Berkawi had strongly condemned Bughaighis' death.

No serious investigation into her assassination has been concluded. Exactly five years after her killing, on 17 June 2019, another female member of parliament, Siham Sergewa, was abducted in Benghazi and has not been seen since.

== Personal life ==
Berkawi was married. Her husband had been a longtime political prisoner under Muammar Gaddafi.
