= Farha Manzoor =

Pakistani politician

Member of the Provincial Assembly of the Punjab
- In office 29 May 2013 – 31 May 2018
- Constituency: Reserved seat for women

Personal details
- Born: 17 August 1975 (age 51) Vehari
- Party: Pakistan Muslim League (N)

Farha Manzoor (Urdu: فرح منظور; born 17 August 1975) is a Pakistani politician who was a Member of the Provincial Assembly of the Punjab, from May 2013 to May 2018.

== Early life ==
She was born 17 August 1975 in Vehari.

== Political career ==
She was elected to the Provincial Assembly of the Punjab as a candidate of the Pakistan Muslim League (N) on a reserved seat for women in the 2013 Pakistani general election.
