= Farhan Hassan Al-Mansour =

Syrian Shia cleric (died 2026)

Farhan Hassan Al-Mansour (died 1 May 2026) was a Syrian Shia cleric known for serving as the preacher of the Sayyida Zaynab Shrine in the Damascus countryside and as a member of the Scholarly Council of the Shia community in Syria. His name gained widespread media attention following his assassination in May 2026 near the Sayyida Zaynab Shrine, an incident that sparked significant reactions inside and outside Syria and renewed attention to the country's sectarian and security tensions.

== Early life ==
Al-Mansour originated from Deir ez-Zor Governorate in eastern Syria and belonged to the Syrian Shia religious minority. He later emerged as one of the well-known clerics in the Sayyida Zaynab area south of Damascus, a district considered an important religious center for Shia Muslims due to the presence of the Sayyida Zaynab Shrine.

== Religious activities ==
Al-Mansour held several religious and social roles, most notably:

- Preacher of the Sayyida Zaynab Shrine.
- Member of the Scholarly Council of the Syrian Shia community.
- Participant in religious and doctrinal events associated with Ahl al-Bayt traditions.
- Organizer and supervisor of religious lectures and gatherings in the Sayyida Zaynab district.

Some media outlets described Al-Mansour as one of the influential Shia clerics in Syrian religious society, particularly in Damascus and its surrounding areas.

== Relationship with the Syrian Shia community ==
Although Al-Mansour was not politically active, he was regarded as one of the prominent religious figures within the Syrian Shia community during the later years of the Syrian conflict, especially as the Sayyida Zaynab district became increasingly important both religiously and strategically and due to his speeches of rejecting violence.

Some sources claimed that he participated in a religious delegation that previously met Syrian President Ahmad al-Sharaa. However, these reports circulated mainly through unofficial channels and were not fully documented through detailed government statements.

== The Sayyida Zaynab Shrine and the Importance of His Role ==
The Sayyida Zaynab Shrine, located in the Damascus countryside, is considered one of the most important Shia pilgrimage sites in the Islamic world. Every year, it receives large numbers of visitors from Syria, Iraq, Iran, Lebanon, Gulf Shia minorities (Bahrain, Saudi Arabia, Kuwait) and other countries. Therefore, it is considered a religious tourism area and an economic resource for the Syrian state.

Because of this significance, the position of the shrine's preacher is regarded as a highly influential religious and social role. Al-Mansour became closely associated with the shrine over several years through his sermons and participation in major religious commemorations.

== Assassination ==
On 1 May 2026, Farhan Hassan Al-Mansour was targeted in an attack near the Sayyida Zaynab Shrine in the Damascus countryside. According to published reports:

- A hand grenade was reportedly thrown into or near his vehicle.
- The explosion occurred near the Safir Al-Zahraa Hotel.
- He suffered severe injuries.
- He was transferred to Al-Kawthar Hospital in the Sayyida Zaynab district.
- He later died from his wounds.

=== ISIS claim of responsibility ===
Several days after the incident, Syrian and Arab media reported that ISIS had claimed responsibility for Al-Mansour's assassination. According to those reports, the group stated that the attack was carried out using an explosive device or grenade targeting his vehicle after Friday prayers and was aimed to cleanse Syria of defilement and infidels. However, no final official Syrian investigation results had been publicly released conclusively confirming any details of the attack.

=== Funeral and reactions ===
Large funeral ceremonies were held in the city of Sayyida Zaynab following Al-Mansour's death. Hundreds of residents, clerics, and members of the Shia community participated. During the funeral, banners and images commemorating him were displayed, while attendees demanded that authorities identify those responsible for the attack.

== International reactions ==
- Iran: Condemned the attack on the preacher of the Sayyida Zeinab shrine, describing it as "part of the American-Israeli conspiracy" to ignite Sunni-Shia conflict.
