= Farhang (given name) =

Farhang (Persian: فرهنگ) is a masculine given name meaning 'culture'. Notable people with the name include:

- Farhang Holakouee
- Farhang Mehr
- Farhang Sharif
