= Aly Hindy =

Egyptian-born Canadian Imam

Aly Hindy is the Imam of the Salaheddin Islamic Centre in Toronto, Ontario.

== Career ==
Hindy immigrated to Canada in 1975 after graduating in Engineering from Ain Shams University in Cairo, Egypt. He spent the next four years studying at the University of Western Ontario, where he received his Doctorate in structural engineering. He worked for Stone & Webster for two years, before starting his 21-year career as a safety engineer for Ontario Hydro.

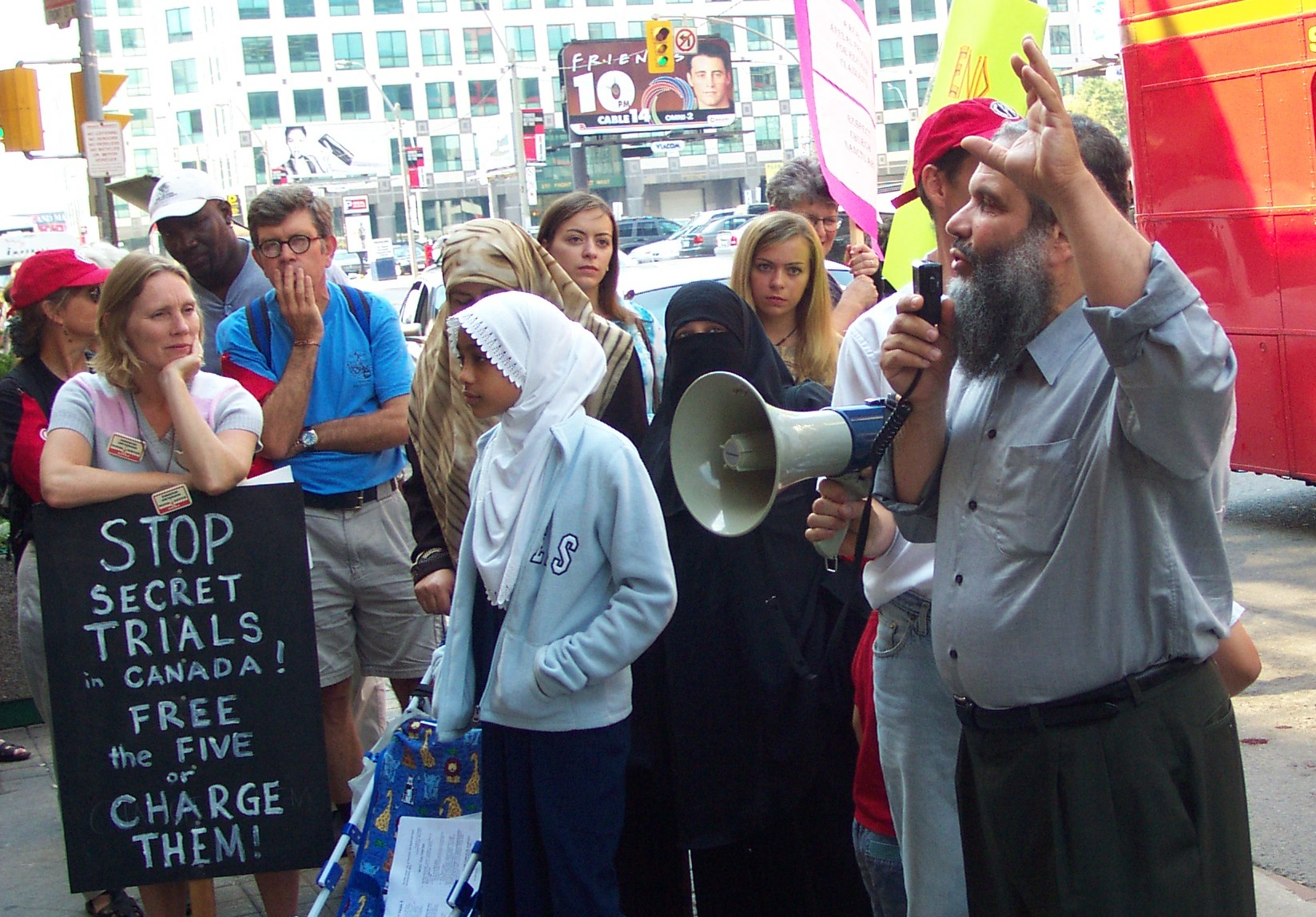
Aly Hindy (right) in 2004

While acting as the director of the Canadian Islamic Congress in Toronto, Hindy was arrested by Egyptian security forces in February 2003 and held for two days before being released. Upon his return from Canada in November 2003, he was questioned for three hours at the Cairo Airport and twice brought to the State Security bureau for interviews.

In 2004, Hindy celebrated the 135th birthday of Mahatma Gandhi by organising a group of 100 local Muslims to videotape the CN Tower as part of a non-violent protest against detention of Kassim Mohamed, who had been arrested after taking footage of the tourist attraction on his video camera.

Hindy has performed at least thirty polygamous wedding ceremonies, which are illegal in Canada.

== Family ==
Hindy's son Imam Ibrahim Hindy is the Imam at Dar Al-Tawheed Islamic Centre (DAT) in Mississauga. Dar Al-Tawheed Islamic Centre (DAT) was established in 2004 to serve the GTA Community. DAT is located in the same building as Safa and Marwa Islamic School (established in 1998).

== Role in legal trials ==
He claims to have cooperated with the Royal Canadian Mounted Police in the past, helping them and answering questions about potential militants in Canada. Hindy claims that he ended that support when he learned that the RCMP were asking the local communities about him.

In 2007, Hindy raised $15,000 from the Toronto Muslim community to add to Hassan Almrei's application for release on bail. However, in December 2009, Federal Court judge Mosley concluded that Almrei has nothing to do with terrorism and found that security certificate is not reasonable and must be quashed.
