= Farhat =

Farhat (Arabic: فَرْحَات, farḥāt) is an Arabic name meaning "happiness delight, pleasure, luckier, good luck, good fortune".

== Given name ==
- Farhat Abbas (born 1976), Indonesian lawyer
- Farhat N. Beg, American physicist
- Farhat Chida (born 1982), Tunisian athlete
- Farhat Hashmi (born 1957), Pakistani scholar
- Farkhat Musabekov (born 1994), Kyrgyzstani footballer

== Surname ==
- Abdallah Farhat (1914–1985), Tunisian politician
- Asmahan Farhat (born 1990), American swimmer
- Charbel Farhat, Lebanese-American academic
- Debbie Farhat (born 1954), American politician
- Ed Farhat (1926–2003), American professional wrestler, known as The Sheik
- Edmond Farhat (1933–2016), Lebanese Catholic bishop, Vatican diplomat
- Hassan Farhat, Iraqi Imam
- Hasan Farhat (born 2004), Lebanese footballer
- Hormoz Farhat, Iranian-American composer, ethnomusicologist, and emeritus professor of music
- Humayun Farhat (born 1981), Pakistani cricketer
- Imran Farhat (born 1982), Pakistani cricketer
- Jon Farhat, special effects artist
- Louey Ben Farhat (born 2006), Tunisian footballer

== Place ==
- Farhat Square, (Sahat Farhat) a city square in Aleppo, Syria
