= Hassan Farhat =

Iraqi Imam

Hassan Farhat (Arabic: حسن فرحات), also known as Abdul Jabbar, Abu Ossama, and Abu Khalid is an Iraqi Imam who founded the Salaheddin Mosque in the Scarborough district of Toronto, Ontario, Canada. He was born in Tal Afar, Iraq.

However, he was made persona non grata by the worship centre's administration, and was allowed to return only for worship. After returning to Iraq in 2001, he was accused of being a "top Ansar commander" by the Patriotic Union of Kurdistan. Other sources have accused him of belonging to Egyptian Islamic Jihad.

== Life in Canada ==
After becoming a landed immigrant in Canada, Farhat lived on Eglinton East, but faced constant difficulty trying to obtain full citizenship, since Canadian Security Intelligence Service was wary of his connections to Egyptian Islamic Jihad.

In 1996, Farhat met Mahmoud Jaballah (an Egyptian who has been detained in Canada due to his association with members of al-Jihad but denies any wrongdoing) at the Medina Mosque in Toronto, and helped him find a local apartment and learn English. Farhat introduced Jaballah to Ali Hussein, and later moved to Winnipeg, Montreal and then back to Toronto. The National Post describes him as one of the founders of the Salaheddin Islamic Centre in Toronto.

It was at Farhat's apartment in Montreal, following the birth of his child, that Jaballah and Mustafa Krer had their only Montreal meeting. Jaballah also visited him in Winnipeg, and phoned him 41 times, once telling him that Kassem Daher would appreciate any religious audiocassettes that Farhat and Jaballah could send him.

Farhat and Daher also spoke to each other, with Farhat once being recorded on a wiretapped call saying he admired the terrorist Omar Abdel Rahman so much that ""he puts the whole world on one scale and ‘the blind one’ on the other, because he was so precious". On February 14, 1997, Mustafa Krer spoke to a companion and referred to Farhat as a man with funds "for the cause".

== Return to Iraq ==
Upset that he was unable to receive Canadian citizenship, the ethnic Turkomen returned to Iraq in October 2001. When Saeed Rasoul, another member of Salaheddin Mosque, returned to the following year there were allegations that Farhat had convinced him to come join Ansar al-Islam.

Osman Ali, an 18-year-old member of Ansar al-Islam detained in prison in Sulaymaniya, spoke to reporter Sandro Contenta from the Toronto Star in March 2003. He told her that his commander was Farhat, and that he told his group that he left Canada because the police accused him of having ties to al Qaeda. It was later alleged that he commanded Al-Aqsa Battalion, a group of 80 militants and six suicide bombers. or alternatively that he led the Yahia Ayash Battalion of the same strength.

He was captured in 2003 by the Patriotic Union of Kurdistan.

On March 7, 2005, he and Saeed Rasoul were named by CSIS Director Jim Judd in remarks to the Senate of Canada, that Farhat "is believed to be a key commander and ideologue with" Ansar al-Islam and that Saeed was "believed to be a member".
