= Paul Copeland =

Retired Canadian lawyer

Paul Copeland C.M. (born February 19, 1940) is a retired Toronto-based human rights lawyer, who is widely known as the defence attorney of security certificate detainee Mohamed Harkat, and a supporter of legal aid.

Copeland co-founded the Law Union of Ontario in 1974 and was the Vice-President of the Criminal Lawyers' Association from 1985 to 1991 and was for several years the co-president of the Association in Defence of the Wrongly Convicted until the fall of 2008. He was elected a Bencher of the Law Society of Upper Canada from 1990 to 2007, and was then made a life bencher of the society. He has been a retired life bencher since 2022. He has served as vice-chair of its Legal Aid Committee and as chair of its Equity and Aboriginal Issues Committee. He has been a leader of the Canadian Campaign for Free Burma.

In June 2006 he argued in the Supreme Court of Canada on behalf of Mohamed Harkat that the security certificate procedure under the Immigration and Refugee Protection Act violated the fundamental justice provisions of Section 7 of the Canadian Charter of Rights and Freedoms. In February 2007 the Supreme Court of Canada unanimously agreed with that argument and held that the procedure violated fundamental justice.

In February 2008 he was granted Top Secret National Security clearance. In June 2008 he was appointed as a special advocate for Mohamed Harkat and for Hassan Almrei in the security certificate proceedings against them. The security certificate in regard to Mr. Almrei was found to be unreasonable by Justice Mosley on December 14, 2010. The Security Certificate against Mohamed Harkat was found to be reasonable in December 2010.

== Awards ==
- In 2006, Copeland was awarded the Sidney B. Linden Award by Legal Aid Ontario, in recognition of his work.
- In 2007 Copeland was awarded the G. Arthur Martin medal for outstanding contribution to criminal justice, 2007
- On December 30, 2010 Copeland was made a Member of the Order of Canada.
- In April, 2013 Copeland was awarded the Law Society Medal by the Law Society of Upper Canada
