= Barbara Jackman =

Canadian lawyer

Barbara Louise Jackman CM (born October 23, 1950) is a Canadian lawyer specializing in immigration and refugee law, with particular emphasis on cases involving domestic violence and international human rights issues, torture and other cruel or unusual punishment, allegations of membership in and/or support of terrorist organizations, the rights and protections afforded by the Canadian Charter of Rights and Freedoms, and Canada's responsibilities under international treaties. She has been described as being one of Canada's most effective advocates for immigration and refugee rights.

Jackman received her undergraduate degree from the University of Windsor in 1972, her LL.B. from the University of Toronto in 1976, and was called to the Bar of Ontario in 1978. She has been awarded honorary Doctor of Laws degrees by the Law Society of Upper Canada in June 2007, by the University of Windsor in June 2010, and by the University of Ottawa in June 2016.

She is actively involved in law reform, and has provided evidence before Standing Committees on Citizenship and Immigration of the House of Commons of Canada as well as proceedings before the Senate of Canada regarding the Anti-terrorism Act, S.C. 2001, c.41, the Canadian special advocate system, and the effects of Canadian law on people involved in domestic violence status proceedings, including Hassan Almrei, Adil Charkaoui, Mahmoud Jaballah and Mohammad Zeki Mahjoub. She has also authored several publications which speak to issues of reform of the Canadian refugee determination system.

== Significant cases ==
Jackman is in private practice, and has acted on behalf of parties or intervenors in a number of leading Charter of Rights cases before the Supreme Court of Canada, as well as other landmark cases concerning other aspects of immigration and refugee matters. In recent years, she has been heavily involved in proceedings relating to domestic violence issues, including security certificates and the Arar and Iacobucci Commissions of Inquiry, regarding the actions of Canadian officials leading to the detention and torture of Maher Arar, Ahmad El-Maati, Muayyed Nureddin and Abdullah Almalki in Syria and Egypt.

She has also argued several seminal motions related to stays of deportation at the Federal Court of Appeal, which are included in the Court's Common List of Authorities Some of Jackman's more recent high-profile cases include representing Mahmoud Jaballah and Mohammad Zeki Mahjoub, detained under Canada's controversial security certificate legislation, as well as representing British politician George Galloway after he was forbidden to enter Canada in March 2009. She was appointed to the Order Of Canada in 2018.
