= Special advocate =

Lawyer appointed in closed proceedings

A special advocate is a lawyer, usually a barrister or advocate, sometimes a solicitor, who is appointed to represent the interests of a party in closed proceedings, i.e. proceedings from which that party has been excluded.

Special advocates are generally prohibited from discussing any evidence that has been the subject of closed proceedings with the excluded party. They are most often used in the context of cases involving national security but have also been used in other matters, including parole board hearings and data protection claims.

== Canada ==
In Canada, special advocates are lawyers independent of government and appointed by a court to protect the interests of persons named in security certificates during the hearings from which persons named in certificates and their own lawyers are excluded. Special advocates are not, however, in a solicitor-client relationship with the person named in the certificate. Special advocates have the required government security clearance for accessing information which the government must keep confidential because its disclosure would be injurious to national security or endanger a person's safety. Special advocates are under strict obligations to maintain the confidentiality of that information.

On February 23, 2007, the Supreme Court of Canada ruled in Charkaoui that the security certificate provisions in the Immigration and Refugee Protection Act were unconstitutional because the process violated the rights of persons named in a certificate to a fair hearing. The Supreme Court of Canada suspended the declaration of invalidity for one year to give Parliament time to amend the security certificate legislation. The government responded to Charkaoui with bill C-3. This legislation adds a special advocate regime to security certificate and related proceedings under the Immigration and Refugee Protection Act. It attempts to strike a balance between protecting the rights of persons named in a certificate and ensuring the confidentiality of information which, if disclosed, would be injurious to national security or endanger a person's safety.

== United Kingdom ==
In the United Kingdom, special advocates have been authorised either by statute or by precedent to appear in closed proceedings before the Special Immigration Appeals Commission, the Proscribed Organisations Appeal Commission, employment tribunals, the Northern Ireland Sentences Review Commission, the Northern Ireland Life Sentences Review Commission or special security tribunals (as defined by Sections 90 to 92 of the Northern Ireland Act 1998).

== New Zealand ==
Two special advocates were appointed in 2005 to represent Ahmed Zaoui, an Algerian asylum seeker who had been detained as a risk to national security, in a review carried out by the Inspector General of Intelligence and Security. The proceedings against Zaoui were subsequently withdrawn in 2007.

== In popular culture ==
In the political thriller film Closed Circuit, Rebecca Hall stars as a special advocate in closed proceedings after a terrorist attack in London.
