= Adil Charkaoui =

Canadian proselyte & imam

- Born: 1974 (age 51–52); Morocco
- Arrested: 2003; Montreal, Quebec, Canada; Royal Canadian Mounted Police security officials
- Citizenship: Canada
- Status: Free, without charges

Adil Charkaoui (in Arabic: عادل الشرقاوي, born 1974) is an imam Morocco-born Canadian citizen who was arrested by the Canadian government under a security certificate in May 2003.

Before issuing the certificate, evidence was submitted that he had trained in an anti-Soviet Jihadist camp in Afghanistan. The court was also not satisfied with his reasons for visiting Pakistan for six months in 1990. Evidence that he practiced Karate was also among the submissions. Canadian Security Intelligence Service (CSIS) testimonies included opinions that he would also "have been trained in such areas as: operating rocket-propelled grenade-launchers, sabotage, urban and assassination." CSIS also alleged that "[i]t was noteworthy that one of those who participated in the hijacking of [the September 11 attacks in 2001] had taken martial arts training in preparation..." and suggested that Charkaoui represented a sleeper agent. This led to the issuance of the security certificate by the two responsible government ministers after which he was detained, and such evidence was also enough to uphold the certificate by Federal Court upon review.

== Personal history ==
Born in Morocco in 1973, Charkaoui joined his sister and parents in moving to Montreal, Quebec in 1995. He has been a Canadian citizen since July 2014.

Charkaoui graduated with an MA from Université de Montréal and is an Arabic-language teacher, who now styles himself as a sheik, and an imam. He is married and has three children, and is a combat sport group leader, as well as a skilled backwoodsman. He is also the director at the Centre communautaire islamique Assahaba. Charkaoui is the President of the Quebec Collective Against Islamophobia, an advocacy rights group he established in 2013.

In the late 1990s, Charkaoui associated with hard-line Montreal Muslims who had turned up in Bosnia, Afghanistan, the Sudan, and other violence-prone areas.

In 1998, he flew to Pakistan to study religion for a book he was hoping to write; the Canadian Security Intelligence Service (CSIS) believes he slipped across the border into Afghanistan and attended Khalden training camp under the name Zubeir Al-Magrebi, although he denies the allegation. According to friends, he knew Raouf Hannachi well enough that the two would "shake hands when they crossed paths".

The government later stated that he had not accounted for "a period of his life, from 1992 to the end of that decade".

=== Arrest and release ===
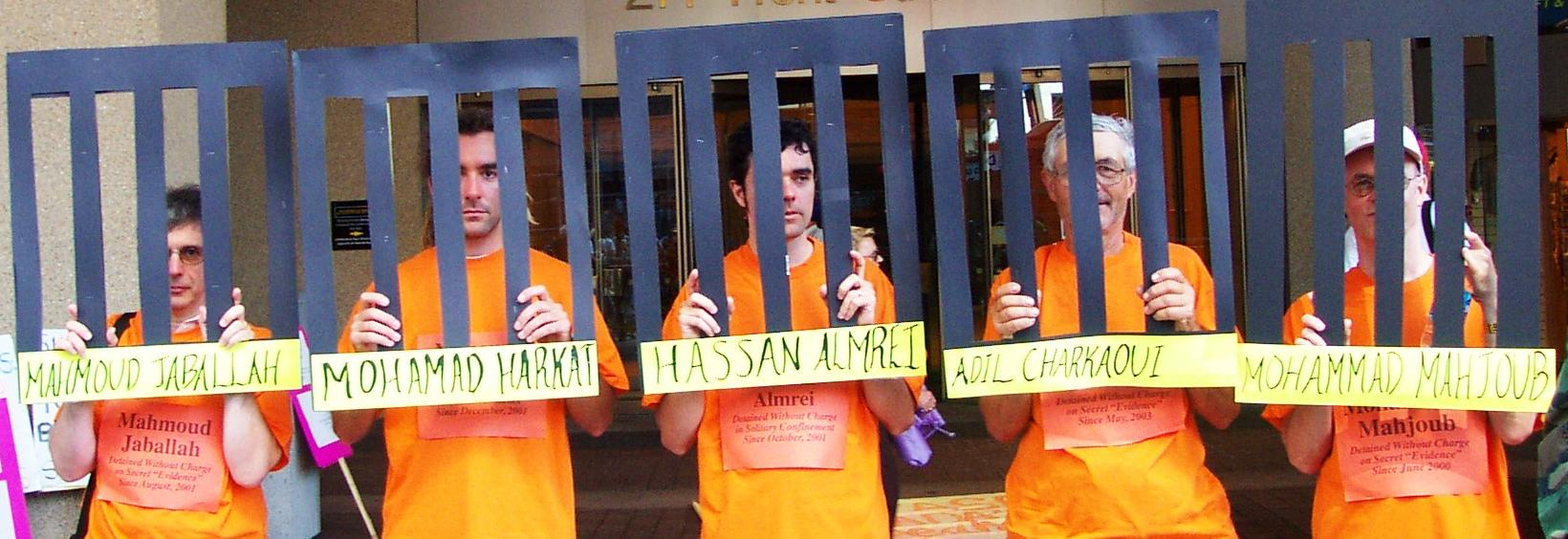
Adil Charkaoui is represented in a 2004 protest outside the Toronto office of CSIS.

From 2001 to 2003, Charkaoui operated a Montreal pizzeria, where the CSIS first approached him in the wake of 9/11. He refused to account for his whereabouts or reason for travel to Pakistan. Moroccan authorities stated that Charkaoui provided funds and resources to an Islamic insurgent group.

Charkaoui was arrested under a security certificate in May 2003, which was co-signed by Solicitor General Wayne Easter, and Immigration Minister Denis Coderre. He was detained without charge or trial in Rivière des prairies Detention Centre. The Coalition Justice for Adil Charkaoui was formed in defense of his rights, with Coalition launching a campaign for his release.

He was released from prison on C$50,000 bail on 18 February 2005. His bail conditions included a curfew, electronic monitoring, designated chaperones for leaving his home, restriction to the island of Montreal, 24-hour police access to his home without warrant, and a prohibition on access to the internet, on the use of cell phones and on the use of any telephone except the one in his home.

Not long after his release, Charkaoui unsuccessfully tried to help Bloc Quebecois candidate Apraham Niziblian defeat Coderre in the 2006 Canadian federal election, saying:

It's not a question of being anti-Coderre. We are citizens before anything, we have the right to have political ideas and to have choice. Gone is the time when the Liberals could take the ethnic vote for granted.

Restrictions on his conditional release were gradually lifted to be cancelled in September 2009. A helpful timeline of his arrest and events subsequent was produced by The Globe and Mail, on his final release order by Federal Court Judge Danièle Tremblay-Lamer: "There will be an order all conditions be revoked immediately."

Charkaoui opened on 22 February 2010 a $24.5 million lawsuit against the Canadian government in Quebec Superior Court in which he demanded compensation for wrongful arrest and detention. He sent a letter asking for an apology, Canadian citizenship and compensation for lost income and legal fees after a federal judge quashed a security certificate against him. Past federal ministers Denis Coderre and Wayne Easter, Diane Finley and Stockwell Day were named in the suit.

=== Defender of Islamic causes ===
In August 2013, Charkaoui defended the right of two foreign Islamic hate-preachers to spread their message in Montreal, even if they held sexist and misogynist views of women in society. Citing security concerns, the event was cancelled by the convention centre where it was supposed to be held. Charkaoui maintained that it was Islamophobia to ban their visit to Canada.

=== Activities at Collège de Maisonneuve ===
For a time prior to 2015, Charkaoui rented classroom space every Sunday from Collège de Maisonneuve, a Montreal Cegep near the Olympic Stadium, for Muslim education and Arabic language studies, which he calls l'École des compagnons. Charkaoui also rented classroom space at the nearby Collège de Rosemont, also a Cegep. It was reported in February 2015 that six of his young students had absconded to Syria, allegedly with intent to join an Islamic terrorist group, either ISIS or the Nusra Front. Of these, four students were following his guidance at the de Maisonneuve location, and at least one teenager, Mohammed Rifaat, he knew through the Rosemont location. In total 11 of 19 which had either left and entered conflict zones or had been arrested entering conflict zones had attended Charkaoui's classes.

Before the week was out, Charkaoui threatened to sue both Colleges because they had terminated the arrangements under which he leased the classroom spaces. At a press conference, he deemed the termination unacceptable and dishonest.

An interview of Charkaoui by ICI RDI's Anne-Marie Dussault sparked quite a bit of controversy the following week. Dressed in a djellaba, Charkaoui presented himself as a victim and rejected calls for him to condemn violent jihadism and the Islamist project. Instead he accused western politicians of promoting violence against Muslims in a degenerate, Islamophobic culture. Charkaoui maintained that ISIS was a creature of the US government, and on his website he hyperlinks to other websites that offer praise of Osama bin Laden. He rejects any interference of the wider community in which he lives on his religious rights; he finds this argument to be nefarious. One commentator was shocked because of what his position meant in the context of his pedagogical pursuits.

== Court challenges to security certificate ==
Charkaoui has consistently denied the allegations against him and has challenged the legitimacy of the security certificate regime. Canadian authorities and the Federal Court have refused to disclose the case against Charkaoui, relying on provisions in the security certificate process that allow evidence to be kept from the defence and the public.

Charkaoui's certificate has not undergone a court review and thus has not been upheld. The case has been suspended since March 2005, pending a new decision on protection by the Minister of Immigration.

Charkaoui has been at the centre of a public campaign against the extension of state power in the name of the "war on terror". In February 2006, Amnesty International reminded Canada, "His fundamental right to liberty and security of the person accords him the right to due process or release from the restrictive bail conditions that have been imposed on him."

In February 2007, the Supreme Court of Canada released its decision of Charkaoui v. Canada (Minister of Citizenship and Immigration) on the appeals Charkaoui, Hassan Almrei, and Mohamed Harkat. The Court ruled that the certificate process violated sections 7, 9 and 10 of the Canadian Charter of Rights and Freedoms, and struck down the security certificate legislation (sections 33 and 77 to 85 of the Immigration and Refugee Protection Act). However, the judgment will not take effect for one year.

In March 2007, the Supreme Court agreed to hear a second challenge by Charkaoui, this time relating to the destruction of evidence in Charkaoui's case. Government lawyers revealed in January 2005 that CSIS had destroyed evidence in Charkaoui's file. The situation raised concerns about the accuracy of the secret evidence before the court. The Supreme Court will hear the challenge in January 2008.

In April 2007, Charkaoui submitted a leave to appeal to the Supreme Court in a third challenge; in this instance to the law permitting deportation of non-citizens when there is a risk of torture. The Canadian government's position is that legal safeguards against being sent to torture do not apply to people who are subject to a security certificate, basing this policy on their interpretation of the 2002 Supreme Court Suresh decision. Charkaoui is challenging the legal framework permitting deportation to torture, the lack of due process, as well as the fact of being subject to the threat of deportation to torture and excessive procedural delays.

A CSIS agent identified only as J.P., the Deputy Chief of Counterterrorism and Counterproliferation in the Ottawa Regional Office as of 2005, testified against the petitions for release by Hassan Almrei, Mahmoud Jaballah and Charkaoui.

In June 2008, Charkaoui managed to have the Supreme Court of Canada overturn as unconstitutional the security certificate. The ruling is known as Charkaoui v. Canada (Citizenship and Immigration) 2008 SCC 38. CSIS was ordered by the SCC to stop destroying its tapes and notes in terrorism investigations. For the previous 25 years CSIS had interpreted their constitutional law as obliging the destruction of such records - a procedure that largely kept CSIS intelligence out of open court - but this was ruled by the SCC a fundamental mistake. Given spies were becoming closer to police in the post-9/11 world, they had to disclose their investigations just like police do. The judges ruled "The only appropriate remedy is to confirm the duty to disclose Charkaoui's entire file to the designated judge and, after the judge has filtered it, to Charkaoui and his counsel."

In motions filed the next summer in Federal Court, lawyers arguing for CSIS said it could not abide by such vast disclosure without jeopardizing its source and methods, which CSIS considers the lifeblood of national security. The Crown pulled all of the wiretaps it used against Charkaoui, and half of its human sources, leaving it with insufficient evidence to meet the security certificate's test that there is a "reasonable suspicion" that Charkaoui is a threat to Canadian national-security. The judgment proceeded accordingly in September 2009.

In May 2013 federal prosecutors produced evidence that Charkaoui may have been plotting a terrorist attack in the Montreal metro in 2002. The memo also mentions CSIS surveillance where Charkaoui was spotted stealing valuables from parked cars.

=== Ahmed Ressam withdraws his allegations ===
Fabrice de Pierrebourg of the Journal de Montreal testified in Federal Court on 22 August 2007 that, in correspondence, Ahmed Ressam had withdrawn his allegations against Adil Charkaoui; the former had written to the latter, who is also known as the Millennium Bomber for his failed plot to bomb LAX airport, in the course of writing a book about terrorism in Montreal.

Ressam was convicted in the United States and held under an unusual arrangement whereby he was offered a reduced sentence in exchange for information. Under this arrangement, over a period of some years, he fingered 130 people as "members" of the "extremist Islamist network linked to Bin Laden". Two cases in the United States were dismissed after Ressam's evidence proved worthless. Earlier in Charkaoui's case, Charkaoui's lawyer introduced an arrest warrant for Ahmed Ressam for an incident that occurred in Montreal at a time when Ressam claimed, under oath in another case, to have been in a training camp in Afghanistan. Ressam is known to have suffered a mental breakdown while in prison.

After learning that Mr. Ressam was supposed to have named him, Charkaoui repeatedly asked to be able to cross-examine him in court, but the motion was not granted.

In the original charges against Charkaoui, two government ministers mistakenly referred to martial arts having been used by a hijacker aboard "American Airlines Flight 93", a mistaken reference likely meant to refer to United Airlines 93 or American Airlines Flight 11.
