= Soviet and Russian influence operations in Canada =

Soviet and Russian influence operations in Canada are clandestine operations conducted by Russian government and government-affiliated entities against Canada. These operations have continued through 2022.

== Terrorism ==
According to Christopher Andrew's and Vasili Mitrokhin's book based on the Mitrokhin archive, the USSR's KGB probably established contact with Canadian terrorist group Front de libération du Québec (FLQ).

The KGB was concerned that FLQ's terrorist attacks could be linked to the Soviet Union. It designed a disinformation campaign and forged documents to portray FLQ as a CIA false flag operation. A photocopy of the forged "CIA document" was "leaked" to Montreal Star in September 1971. The operation was so successful that Canada's Prime Minister believed that CIA had conducted operations in Canada. The story was still quoted in the 1990s, even among academic authors.

== Use of Canadian passports ==
The Soviet government used Canada's warm relationship with the Soviet Union to cultivate a hospitable training ground for Soviet spies, who would later operate as deep-cover agents inside the United States. Young KGB candidates would be inserted into prestigious universities, such as McGill, where they would learn English under a new identity, then begin their journey to operate southbound. Russian government agents have a record of using Canadian passports and identities, as, in recent history, evidenced by the cases of 'Paul Hampel' (2006), and Donald Heathfield and Tracey Foley, members of the group of Russian sleeper agents ("Illegals Program") arrested in the US June 2010.

== 2022 Russian invasion in Ukraine ==
On 1 March 2022, during the 2022 Russian invasion of Ukraine, the embassy claimed that The Russian army does not occupy Ukrainian territory and takes all measures to preserve the lives and safety of civilians, without providing evidence. The Embassy claimed that the responsibility for all civilian deaths during the Russian attack, called "Special Military Operation" in Kremlin-controlled media, was on the Ukrainian side. Canadian Foreign Affairs Minister Mélanie Joly has referred to claims from the Russian Embassy as "misinformation" and "propaganda".

== Homophobia ==
The Russian Embassy has been critical to homosexuality in Canada, especially three gay members of the Canadian Cabinet. The Russian ambassador has claimed that Russia does not interfere in internal Canadian affairs.

== See also ==
- Russian influence operations in Estonia
- Russian influence operations in India
- Russian influence operations in the United States
