= Charkaoui v Canada (Minister of Citizenship and Immigration) =

- Supreme Court of Canada

Hearing: June 13–14, 2006 Judgment: February 23, 2007
- Full case name: Adil Charkaoui v Minister of Citizenship and Immigration and Minister of Public Safety and Emergency Preparedness; Hassan Almrei v Minister of Citizenship and Immigration and Minister of Public Safety and Emergency Preparedness; Mohamed Harkat v Minister of Citizenship and Immigration, Minister of Public Safety and Emergency Preparedness and Attorney General of Canada
- Citations: 2007 SCC 9
- Docket No.: 30929
- Prior history: Charkaoui History: reversing [2005] 2 F.C.R. 299, 247 D.L.R. (4th) 405, 328 N.R. 201, 126 C.R.R. (2d) 298, 42 Imm. L.R. (3d) 165, [2004] F.C.J. No. 2060 (QL), 2004 FCA 421 (F.C.A.D.); affirming [2004] 3 F.C.R. 32, 253 F.T.R. 22, 38 Imm. L.R. (3d) 56, [2003] F.C.J. No. 1816 (QL), 2003 FC 1419 (F.C.T.D.). Almrei history: reversing [2005] 3 F.C.R. 42, 251 D.L.R. (4th) 13, 330 N.R. 73, 45 Imm. L.R. (3d) 163, [2005] F.C.J. No. 213 (QL), 2005 FCA 54 (F.C.A.D.); affirming [2004] 4 F.C.R. 327, 249 F.T.R. 53, 38 Imm. L.R. (3d) 117, [2004] F.C.J. No. 509 (QL), 2004 FC 420 (F.C.T.D.). Harkat history: also reversing (2005), 340 N.R. 286, [2005] F.C.J. No. 1467 (QL), 2005 FCA 285 (F.C.A.D.); affirming (2005), 261 F.T.R. 52, 45 Imm. L.R. (3d) 65, [2005] F.C.J. No. 481 (QL), 2005 FC 393 (F.C.T.D.).
- Ruling: Appeals allowed

Holding
- Sections 33, 77 and 85 of the Immigration and Refugee Protection Act (IRPA) unreasonably violates sections 7, 9 and 10 of the Canadian Charter of Rights and Freedoms.

Court membership
- Chief Justice: Beverley McLachlin; Puisne Justices: Michel Bastarache, Ian Binnie, Louis LeBel, Marie Deschamps, Morris Fish, Rosalie Abella, Louise Charron, Marshall Rothstein

Reasons given
- Unanimous reasons by: McLachlin C.J.

Laws applied
- Canadian Charter of Rights and Freedoms, ss. 7, 9, 10; Immigration and Refugee Protection Act, S.C. 2001, c. 27, ss. 33, 77 to 85

Charkaoui v Canada (Minister of Citizenship and Immigration), [2007] 1 S.C.R. 350, 2007 SCC 9, is a landmark decision of the Supreme Court of Canada on the constitutionality of procedures for determining the reasonableness of a security certificate and for reviewing detention under a certificate. The Court held that the security certificate process, which prohibited the named individual from examining evidence used to issue the certificate, violated the right to liberty and habeas corpus under section 7, 9 and 10 of the Canadian Charter. The Court however rejected the appellant arguments that the extension of detentions violated the right against indefinite detention, that the differential treatment violated equality rights, and that the detention violated the rule of law. As remedy, the Court declared the "judicial confirmation of certificates and review of detention" to be of no force and effect, striking down articles 33 and 77 to 85 of the Immigration and Refugee Protection Act, but suspended the ruling for one year.

== Background ==
=== Charkaoui ===
In 2003, Adil Charkaoui, a permanent resident in Canada since 1995, was arrested and imprisoned under a security certificate issued by the Solicitor General of Canada (then Wayne Easter) and the Minister of Immigration (then Denis Coderre). The evidence upon which the certificate was issued is secret, disclosed neither to Charkaoui nor his lawyers. Public summaries of the evidence issued by the Federal Court alleged a connection with "the bin Laden network". Charkaoui appealed his detention three times before being released on the fourth try in February 2005, having spent almost two years in Rivière-des-Prairies prison in Montreal. He was released under severely restrictive bail conditions. Charkaoui has never been charged or tried. The certificate against Charkaoui has never undergone any judicial review; the Federal Court suspended its review process in March 2005, pending a new decision from the Minister of Immigration on Charkaoui's deportability (a decision which evaluates, inter alia, risk to Mr. Charkaoui).

=== Almrei ===
Hassan Almrei is a foreign national who was granted refugee status in Canada in June 2000. It was later reported that Almrei was potentially involved with a terrorist network that supported Osama bin Laden and was further involved in forging travel documentation. Almrei was arrested on October 19 of 2001 on a security certificate. The certificate has since been upheld as valid by the Federal Court.

In December 2001 the government attempted to have Almrei declared a "danger to Canadian security" thereby be deported to Syria. In December 2003 the declaration was given. Almrei sought judicial review of the decision to deport him and a stay was granted in November 2003. Canadian certificates was enacted in this case.

=== Harkat ===
The Minister of Citizenship and Immigration issued a security certificate under section 34 of the Immigration and Refugee Protection Act (IRPA) for Mohamed Harkat, an Algerian living in Canada, on the basis that they reasonably believed he was supporting terrorist activity. The certificate was reviewed by a Federal Court judge under section 77 of IRPA. The Federal judge found that the certificate was reasonable. Harkat challenged constitutionality of the provisions of IRPA under which the security certificate was reviewed.

Leave to appeal to the Supreme Court was granted on October 20, 2005.

== Decision of the Court ==
Chief Justice McLachlin, writing for a unanimous court, holds that sections 33 and 77 to 85 of the IRPA unreasonably violates sections 7, 9 and 10 of the Canadian Charter of Rights and Freedoms.

On the section 1 analysis for justification of the violation the Court held that the certificate process was not minimally impairing. The Court cited a clearance system in the United Kingdom that would designate certain lawyers to view the evidence on behalf of the accused.

The court also found that s. 84(2) of the IRPA was unconstitutional because it denied a prompt hearing to foreign nationals by imposing a 120-day embargo on any application for release. The court corrected this defect by removing this mandatory waiting-period.

== Events subsequent to the decision ==
On 26 July 2008, the means by which Charkaoui was detained known as a security certificate was vitiated in Charkaoui v. Canada (Citizenship and Immigration) 2008 SCC 38.

On 31 July 2009, the Crown admitted to Justice Tremblay-Lamer that there was insufficient evidence to uphold the security certificate against Mr. Charkaoui. This followed the Crown withdrawing much of its evidence in the face of Court orders for greater transparency. In response Tremblay-Lamer J. issued a directive on August 5, 2009 saying she would consider whether she should quash the certificate or order the Ministers to revoke it themselves on her return from holidays, in early September.

On 24 September 2009, Tremblay-Lamer J. announced she would lift all restrictions on Mr. Charkaoui by the end of the day.

== See also ==
- List of Supreme Court of Canada cases (McLachlin Court)
- List of Supreme Court of Canada cases
