= Glenn Carle =

American writer

- Education: Bachelors in Government at Harvard, 1985 an Masters of Arts in European Studies and International Economics from Johns Hopkins University's School of Advanced International Studies (SAIS)
- Occupations: Former CIA officer, former and founding member of Veteran Intelligence Professionals for Sanity, author

Glenn Carle is an American writer and former intelligence officer. He is the author of The Interrogator: An Education (2011), which describes his involvement in the interrogation of a man at the time believed to be one of the top members of al-Qa'ida. He is a former and founding member of Veteran Intelligence Professionals for Sanity.

== Biography ==
Glenn Carle grew up in Brookline, a town part of greater Boston, in a house "where four generations of his family made their home". Carle received a B.A. in Government at Harvard and in 1985 an M.A. in European Studies and International Economics from Johns Hopkins University's School of Advanced International Studies (SAIS), and completed further graduate work in Europe. He spent 20 years in clandestine field operations with the Central Intelligence Agency (CIA). Carle retired as Deputy National Intelligence Officer for Transnational Threats from the National Intelligence Council.

== The Interrogator ==
Carle is the author of The Interrogator: An Education (2011), a memoir which describes his involvement in the interrogation of a "high-value detainee" at a "black site" (off-the-books) prison. Carle tells the story of the brutal interrogation of a man who was believed to be a top al-Qaeda operative but later turned out to be innocent. Carle determined that the suspect was not who he was supposed to be, found the rendition "stupid, bad tradecraft" and the operation to be "a house of cards, like so much of the war on terrorism. Carle's superiors overruled him and sent the suspect to Hotel California, the CIA's most secret detention centre, to be tortured. The suspect at the center of Carle's story is supposed to be Haji Pacha Wazir, an Emirati citizen. He was freed in February 2010, eight years after his capture.

In Carle's words, the CIA made him rewrite The Interrogator "literally a dozen times over" and its objections were some legitimate concerns "amply mixed with ludicrous pettifoggery and ass-covering", causing him to leave in the redacted bits, complete with black bars, and add the occasional withering explanatory footnote, like one that reads: "Apparently the CIA fears that the redacted passage would either humiliate the organization for incompetence or expose its officers to ridicule; unless the Agency considers obtuse incompetence a secret intelligence method."

Johns Hopkins Magazine has found The Interrogator to be "unusually candid in its portrayal of the CIA's internal workings—and the toll the agency's moral gray zones take on its operatives". Carle's book was well received internationally and he was interviewed at the Sydney Writers' Festival in 2012. Ali Soufan, a renowned FBI Special Agent who was involved in counter-terrorism cases, reviewed The Interrogator for The Wall Street Journal and remarked that it pulled back part of the curtain on the so-called enhanced-interrogation program of the CIA.

== Post-CIA career as national/global security expert ==
Carle is regarded as a leading expert on al-Qaeda and assessed the threat the organization poses 10 years after the terrorist attacks of September 11, 2001 on C-SPAN. Carle is a regular commentator for Al Jazeera and has appeared on Inside Story Americas. He was interviewed on The Listening Post to comment on the 'Zero Dark Thirty' controversy. In a 2011 interview with Democracy Now! Carle revealed how, in 2005, President George W. Bush's administration at least twice sought damaging personal information from the CIA on Juan Cole, an academic and prominent critic of the Iraq war. A CIA spokesman said in response to queries, "We've thoroughly researched our records, and any allegation that the C.I.A. provided private or derogatory information on Professor Cole to anyone is simply wrong." In an interview with New Zealand's Sunday Star-Times, he talked about the curtailment of freedom of speech under the Espionage Act of 1917, designed for foreign spies, which he claimed was being employed to prosecute at least six American former spies.

Carle has appeared on MSNBC in Hardball with Chris Matthews in a discussion titled "Does torture work?" In an interview with Anderson Cooper 360° he made the point that "you don't define yourself by the practices and objectives of the enemy" but figure out who are we and what do we need to be?" Carle has repeatedly stated that torture doesn't work, is morally wrong and is clearly illegal under both international and U.S. law. He makes the point that the U.S. convicted many Japanese soldiers "for the express crime – the torture – of waterboarding" that it has euphemistically called waterboarding. Carle also appeared on The Diane Rehm Show on NPR to comment on intelligence gains from Osama bin Laden's compound after U.S. Navy SEALs killed the al-Qaeda leader in Abbottabad, Pakistan. He has also been interviewed on Hardtalk on the BBC.

Before the presidential election of 2008, Carle argued in an influential Washington Post article that Senator John McCain, the Republican nominee, had overstated the threat of "radical Islamic extremism." Carle wrote that jihadists are "small, lethal, disjointed and miserable opponents" and that "We do not face a global jihadist 'movement' but a series of disparate ethnic and religious conflicts involving Muslim populations, each of which remains fundamentally regional in nature and almost all of which long predate the existence of al-Qaeda." He went on to say, "Osama bin Laden and his disciples are small men and secondary threats whose shadows are made large by our fears."

Carle has spoken at many institutions, including the University of Ottawa, the Delta State University, Boston College, the University of Sydney, and the United States Naval Academy.

Carle has been critical of President Donald Trump, particularly after Trump began to disparage American intelligence agencies' assessment of Russian influence over the 2016 presidential election. He told Newsweek, in an article dated December 21, 2017, that he believed that President Donald Trump was "actually working directly for the Russians."
