= Mubarak al-Duri =

An Iraqi doctor, Mubarak al-Duri (مبارك الدوري) (also Mubarak Douri, Mubarak el Doory) ran an agricultural project owned by Osama bin Laden from 1992 to 1994, and is alleged to have procured weapons and equipment overseas.

== Life in the United States ==
In the 1980s, he was living in Tucson, Arizona, where he was in contact with Wadi al-Hage, who also lived in the city. The pair were likely associated with the city's fledgling Maktab al-Khidamat.

== Life in Sudan ==
While living in Khartoum in 1991, al-Duri shared an office with Al-Jihad member Abu Hassan el Masry. He was a personal friend of Syrian-American honey producer Mohammed Loay Bayazid, who is believed to have recruited him.

al-Duri worked for the agricultural firm named Al-Thimar al-Mubaraka (Blessed Fruits) which exported corn and sunflower seeds, and employed 10,000 workers, and was in charge of their Al-Damazin Farms project, which included 4,000 seasonal workers tending nearly a million acres (4,000 km²).

An agricultural engineer named Mohammad Zeki Mahjoub met with al-Duri, at the request of Bin Laden and became the farms' Deputy General Manager. On October 17, 1993, al-Duri wrote Mahjoub a reference letter vouching for his work with the farms in al-Damazin from February 1992 until May 1993.

== Life in Canada ==
He is reported to have lived in Richmond, British Columbia, probably in the late 1990s.

He was also in contact with Mohammad Zeki Mahjoub.

In 2005, Canadian judge Eleanor Dawson released a ruling that suggested that al-Duri likely maintained contact with Essam Marzouk while living in British Columbia.

== Return to Sudan ==
In November 2001, al-Duri was contacted by Sudanese intelligence services who informed him that the FBI had sent Jack Cloonan and several other agents, to speak with himself and Mohamed Loay Bayazid. al-Duri and another Iraqi colleague agreed to meet with Cloonan in a safe house overseen by the intelligence service. They were asked whether there was any possible connection between Saddam Hussein and al-Qaeda, and laughed stating that Bin Laden hated the dictator who he believed was a "Scotch-drinking, woman-chasing apostate.”

In 2002, the CIA sent Rolf Mowatt-Larssen to again interview al-Duri and Bayazid, to see if they couldn't be made to defect, although both refused.

Now lives in hiding between the Gulf states and Iraq
