= Toronto West Detention Centre =

Demolished prison in Ontatio, Canada

Coordinates: 43.699408°N 79.597959°W

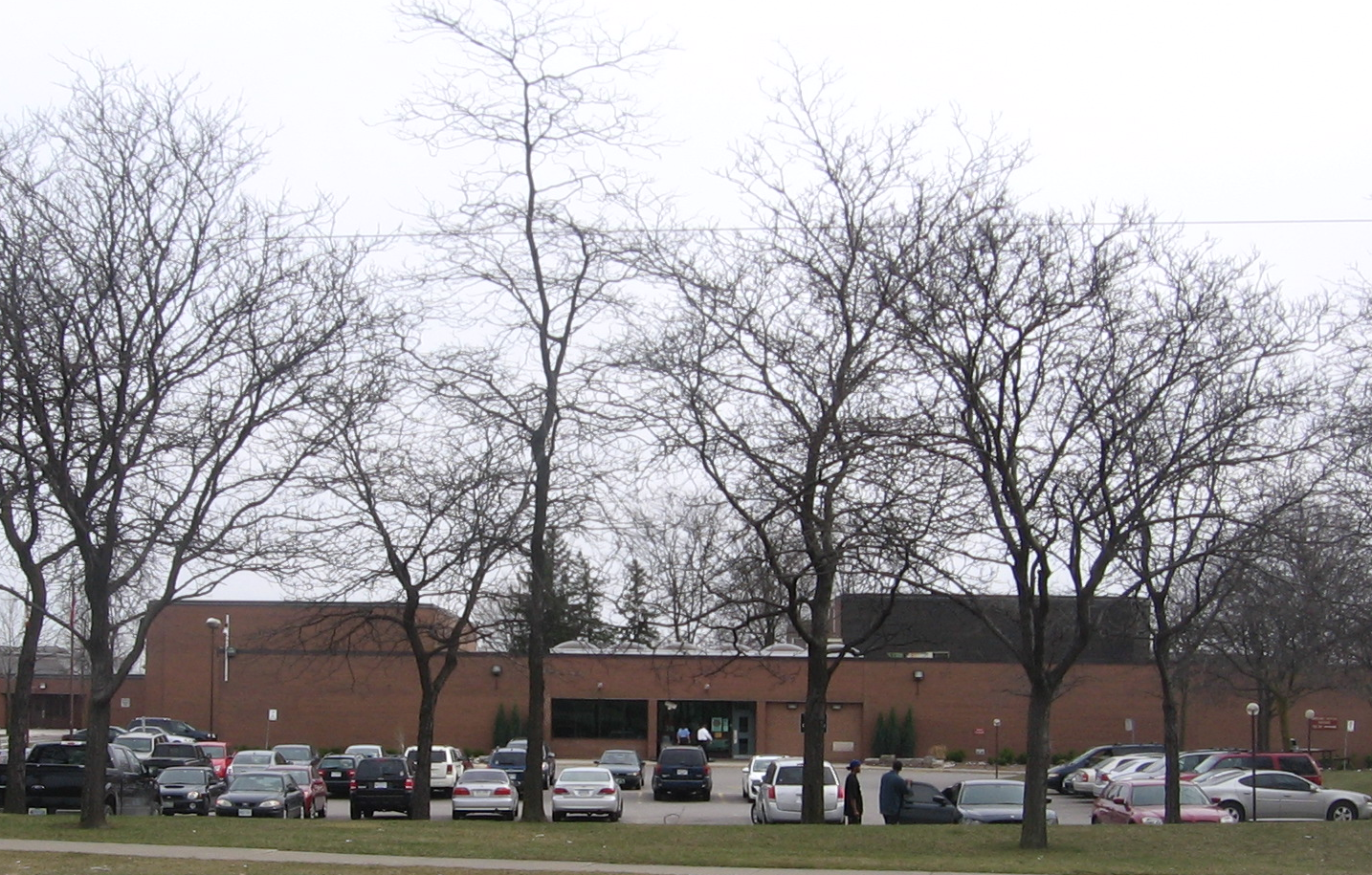
- Interactive map of Toronto West Detention Centre
- Location: 111 Disco Rd, Toronto, Ontario
- Status: Closed
- Security class: Maximum
- Capacity: 631
- Opened: 1976
- Closed: December 2014 Demolished December 2016
- Managed by: Ministry of Community Safety and Correctional Services

The Toronto West Detention Centre was a maximum security remand facility located in Rexdale, a community located in the north-west corner of Toronto, Ontario, Canada. The facility was known as the Metropolitan Toronto West Detention Centre until Rexdale, as part of the City of Etobicoke, became part of the newly amalgamated City of Toronto in 1998.

With a designed capacity for 631 prisoners, the Toronto West Detention Centre housed adult males who had been remanded into custody while awaiting trial or sentencing, were serving short sentences, or were awaiting transfer to federal or provincial correctional facilities. Over the years the Toronto West Detention Centre had at times also housed female and juvenile offenders. From October 1997 through January 1999 the facility underwent extensive retrofitting of its security systems using up-to-date technology. The facility has also housed foreign nationals being detained on security certificates.

In January 2014, the Toronto South Detention Centre opened to replace the Toronto West Detention Centre and the Toronto Jail (Don Jail). The Toronto Jail was demolished and is now a vacant site situated beside the new hospital facility.

Demolition of the Toronto West Detention Centre began in December 2016. In April 2025, the Ontario government announced plans to construct a new Emergency Preparedness and Response Headquarters on the former prison site at 111 Disco Road. The facility is intended to serve as the province's emergency command centre and headquarters of Ontario Corps. In December 2025, the province awarded a contract to WZMH Architects to develop the project's functional programming, with completion expected in 2026.

== Notable prisoners ==
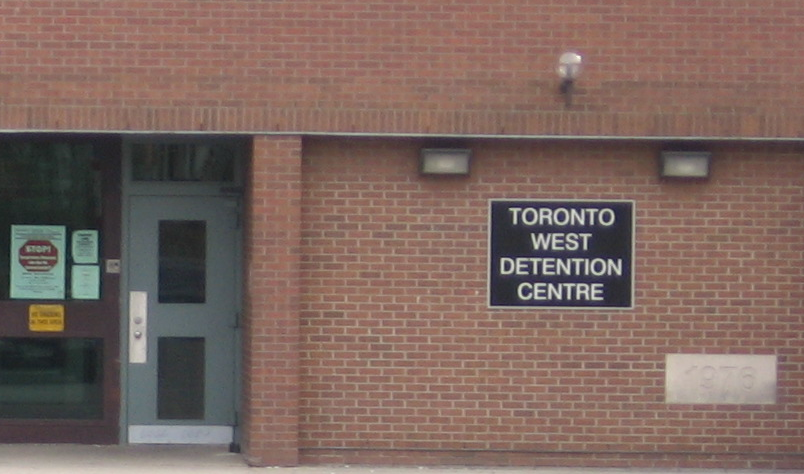
The entrance to TWDC

- Hassan Almrei, Syrian who came to Canada on a forged passport, alleged to have been involved in an al Qaeda forgery ring.
- Wahid Khalil Baroud, Palestinian who came to Canada on a forged passport, alleged to be a member of the Palestine Liberation Organization (PLO) Force 17, who served as a bodyguard to PLO leader Yasser Arafat and coordinated PLO terrorist acts.
- Laurie Bembenek, also known as Bambi Bembenek, convicted of murder of her husband's ex-wife
- Karla Homolka, serial killer, co-accused with her then-husband Paul Bernardo
- Abdullah Khadr, awaiting extradition, 2004–current, alleged tied to terrorism.
- Karlheinz Schreiber, German-Canadian businessman embroiled in a dispute with former Canadian Prime Minister Brian Mulroney; later extradited to Germany
- Ernst Zündel, neo-Nazi, was held at Toronto West from 2003 until his 2005 deportation

== See also ==
- List of correctional facilities in Ontario
