= LIPR =

LIPR may refer to:

- Federico Fellini International Airport, ICAO code
- Immigration and Refugee Protection Act, Loi sur l’immigration et la protection des réfugiés in French, a Canadian Act of Parliament
