= Mohamed Harkat =

Algerian alleged terrorist in Canada

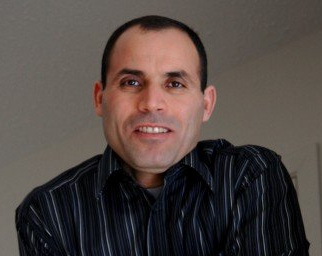
- Harkat in 2008
- Born: August 6, 1968; Taguine, Algeria
- Other name: kunya: Abu Muslima
- Education: University of Oran
- Spouse: Sophie Lamarche Harkat

Mohamed Harkat (Arabic: محمد حركات) (born August 6, 1968, Algeria) is a native-born Algerian and permanent resident of Canada who was arrested in 2002 and was imprisoned under security certificates after the Canadian Security Intelligence Service (CSIS) concluded that he entered the country as a sleeper agent for al-Qaeda. His court challenge of the government's security certificate proceedings - which could lead to his deportation from Canada - are ongoing. The Harkat case is one of Canada's longest-running judicial matters.

== Early life and education ==
Mohamed Harkat was born in Taguine, Algeria to El-Ait, and is one of seven sons. His father was born in Algeria, but worked both there and in France in the construction business.

As a student at the University of Oran, Harkat joined the Front Islamique du Salut (FIS) in 1989, when it was still a legitimate political movement. He offered them the use of a family-owned house in Zmalet El Emir Abdelkader as a registered district office. Harkat was excused from Algerian military service because he broke his left leg as a child and it never properly healed.

In March 1990, the Algerian government stormed the house and arrested the FIS members within. Harkat was not present, and was warned by his uncle that security forces were seeking him. He fled Algeria in 1990 as a university student opposed to its then military-backed government.

== Leaving Algeria ==
Harkat departed in April 1990 for a trip to Saudi Arabia using a Hajj passport. From there he travelled to Pakistan, where the Muslim World League employed him and sent him to Peshawar in May 1990, to help distribute relief packages and organise aid programs. For the next four years, Harkat worked and lived out of a Babbi warehouse. He picked up shipments of food and relief supplies for the refugee camps in the city from the Peshawar airport and train station, earning $300–500 monthly.

CSIS has alleged that during this time he also worked for Human Concern International. They suggest that this meant he was a formal colleague of Ahmed Khadr, and that he may have run a guest house for foreign mujahideen traveling to participate in the Afghan civil war.

In June 1994 Harkat lost his job. He lived off his $18,000 in savings for the next year. He has made contradictory statements suggesting he either deposited $12,000 of his earnings in a bank through his friend Haji Wazir, or that he never used a bank and kept all his money with him. CSIS contends that Pacha Wazir, to whom they believe Harkat is referring, is an Emirati citizen known to have connections to al-Qaeda.

The Canadian Security Intelligence Service (CSIS) alleges that Harkat and "Mohammad Adnani" were the same person, and that during this time, he joined the more militant Groupe Islamique Armé wing of FIS. They allege he eventually aligned with Gama`at Islamiyya. CSIS will not provide a source for this claim, arguing that the information came from "open sources".

In September 1995, Harkat paid $5000 for airfare to travel from Pakistan to Malaysia, from where he hoped to catch a direct flight to Canada. In Kuala Lumpur, he purchased a forged Saudi passport in the name of Mohammed M. Mohammed S. Al Qahtani for $1200 from a stranger named Abu Abdallah Pakistani, to carry in addition to his legitimate Algerian passport. Saudi passports did not require entry visas to visit Canada.

== In Canada ==
Holding about $1000, Harkat flew from Malaysia to Toronto via the United Kingdom on October 6, 1995. He contacted Taher, a colleague he had met in 1994 in Peshawar then living in Ottawa, Ontario. He arranged to meet him at the Ottawa bus station, since he said he had been told that it was best to start a refugee claim from the city. Taher met him at the bus terminal and took him to the mosque, where he was introduced to Abrihim, a convert to Islam who lived beside the mosque. He allowed Harkat to live with him for a week or two.

Harkat said that he would be persecuted by the Algerian government if he returned, due to his past membership in the FIS. His claim was accepted on February 24, 1997 and he was recognized as a refugee by Canada. In March of that year, he applied for Permanent Resident status.

He worked as a gas station attendant and a deliveryman for Pizza Pizza during his first seven years in Canada.

While attending prayers at the Ottawa Mosque on Northwestern Avenue, he met Mohamed el-Barseigy, who was looking for someone to share his apartment. Accepting el-Barseigy's offer of a drive back to Toronto, Harkat was introduced to Ahmed Khadr, who was also in the van. Harkat has said that Khadr was silent during most of the trip, and his only advice to Harkat was "tell the truth to immigration authorities." (A Federal Court justice commented that this was "inherently implausible and incredible".) They never met again after the 5-hour drive.

Harkat was also in contact with Fahad al-Shehri, who was later deported from the country. In 1996, after el-Barseigy moved to a new home, Harkat moved to 391 Nelson Street, Apartment 1. At the end of the year, he enrolled in English courses at the Ottawa Technical High School.

On October 4, 1997, he was interviewed by CSIS, and was accused of using the alias "Abu Muslima", which he denied. In 2004, he recanted his denial and admitted using the name in Pakistan.

He became addicted to gambling, and lost several thousand dollars - prompting authorities to ask where he'd gotten the money in the first place. He said that a man named Wael, a mutual friend with Harkat's close friend Abdel Mokhtar, had come to Canada with $60,000 to start a business. Liking Harkat, he offered to loan him $10,000 and then an additional $8,000 to open an antique store and a gas station. Harkat also stated that the money was from Mokhtar, rather than Wael.

It later came to light that one of the CSIS agents detailed to collect information on Harkat had been Theresa Sullivan, who had been fired in 2002 after she carried on an extramarital affair with one of her informants. Given this behavior, Harkat questioned in court whether information she provided about him to CSIS was reliable.

For the past decade, Harkat has been living and working in Ottawa - he's now a church janitor - while fighting his extradition in court.

== Marriage and family ==
Harkat married Canadian citizen Sophie Lamarche, who he met at the gas station he worked at, in January 2001.

== Arrest ==
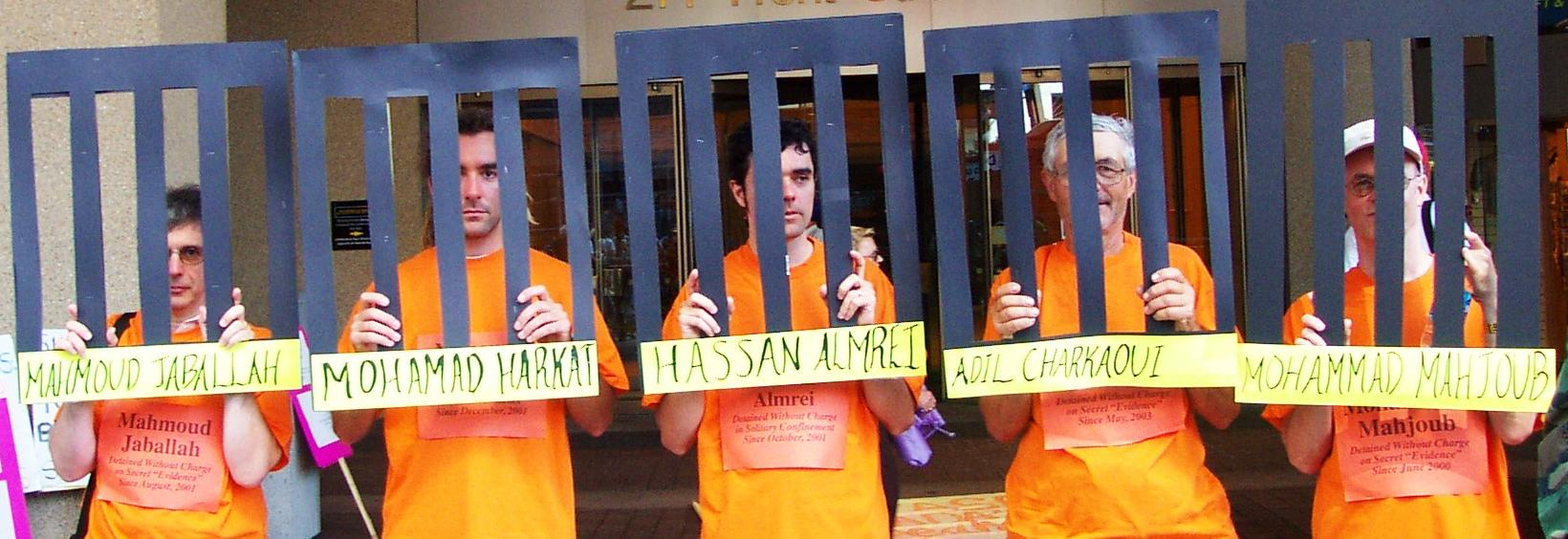
Mohamed Harkat is represented in a 2004 protest outside the Toronto office of CSIS.

Harkat was arrested in Ottawa on December 10, 2002 as a threat to national security, after a security certificate was issued on the recommendation of CSIS. Its officers relied upon secret evidence that has not been revealed due to national security concerns.

Public statements indicated that Abu Zubaydah, who was waterboarded during harsh interrogations by the United States, described a man "similar to" Harkat running a guest house in Pakistan that shuttled mujahideen to Chechnya, although he did not use Harkat's name. This led the United States to accuse Harkat of "assisting terrorists, including the September 11 hijackers".

On March 22, 2005, Federal Court judge Eleanor Dawson ruled that the security certificate binding Harkat was reasonable. On December 30 of that year, a federal court judge dismissed Harkat's application for release. In April 2006, he was moved, along with the other four detainees, to a section at the Millhaven Institution specifically built for those held under security certificates.

== Release and subsequent court proceedings ==
On May 23, 2006, Harkat was released on a $100,000 bail by Justice Dawson. The release conditions stipulated that he be in the company of his wife, Sophie Harkat, or mother-in-law, Pierrette Brunette, at all times. Additionally, Harkat was required to wear a tracking bracelet and was prohibited from using electronic means of communication. Any trips outside of his house were to be approved by the Canada Border Services Agency (CBSA) 48 hours in advance. The CBSA were also allowed constant access to his house, were required to approve any visitors to the house, and had two agents accompany him on any outings.

On June 13–14, 2006, the Supreme Court of Canada heard the case of Harkat v. Canada on the constitutionality of security certificates. On December 22, Harkat's lawyer, Paul Copeland, announced that Federal Court Chief Justice Allan Lutfy would grant a judicial review of the original deportation order in Federal Court.

The Canada Border Services Agency added six full-time positions for surveillance agents to follow Harkat at all times, at an annual cost of $868,700, as well as purchasing a new $31,000 car for the tailing, and spent $5,000 monthly to have staff monitoring Harkat's tracking bracelet.

On January 29, 2008, CBSA agents entered Harkat's home while he was showering, and placed him under arrest. They cited a breach of bail conditions, since his mother-in-law had not stayed at the house for several days following an argument with her husband. He was released after being questioned about the matter.

On September 24, 2008, judge Simon Noël ruled that CSIS must disclose their "secret" evidence against Harkat, allowing him and his lawyers to view the material. CSIS said this could take up to six months. Six months later, Judge Noël ordered the release conditions be loosened, allowing Harkat to remain home alone without requiring his wife to be present at all times. In May 2009, judge Noël had said that the unwillingness of CSIS to share its material regarding the reliability of an informant who gave evidence against Harkat was "troubling." He ordered them to disclose the confidential files to Harkat's defence lawyers who held security clearance. CSIS claimed to have destroyed all original copies of their evidence, and offered copies to the court and defence lawyers.

In December 2010, Federal Court Judge Simon Noël deemed Harkat a member of the terrorist network and linked him to several Islamic extremists, including Canadian Ahmed Said Khadr, Saudi-born Ibn Khattab and Abu Zubaydah. He said Harkat operated a guest house for Khattab in Peshawar, Pakistan for at least 15 months. Noël also found that Harkat offered assistance to two Islamic extremists who travelled to Canada.

In May 2014, the Supreme Court of Canada ruled that security certificate process used against Harkat was fair and reasonable. In doing so, it upheld the government's security certificate and reinstated Noël's decision that found Harkat to be an active member of the al-Qaida network. While this theoretically cleared the way for his deportation to Algeria, the risk that he could be tortured if returned requires the Canada Border Services Agency to balance these risks prior to removing him from Canada.

In March 2016 filmmaker Alexandre Trudeau, the younger brother of Prime Minister Justin Trudeau, wrote a letter to Public Safety Minister Ralph Goodale asking that Harkat be allowed to stay, causing Erin O'Toole, the Conservative public safety critic and Democracy Watch to demand the Prime Minister recuse himself from any decision regarding Harkat.

== Danger Opinion Process ==
The decision on the reasonableness of Harkat's security certificate became final when it was upheld by the Supreme Court of Canada in 2014. That said, his removal process remains outstanding. The next step in the process is what is referred to as the danger opinion stage. CBSA sought a danger opinion from the Minister of Public Safety and Emergency Preparedness to determine whether Mr. Harkat poses a danger to national security, whether the nature and severity of the acts committed reach a serious level of gravity, and, if so, whether the risk to Mr. Harkat in deporting him outweighs the danger posed to national security. The danger opinion package with Mr. Harkat’s submissions was provided to Immigration, Refugees and Citizenship Canada for decision on March 8, 2017, and a senior officer was assigned to consider the case on March 31, 2017. A decision was then reached in his case on October 2, 2018 in which the Minister’s delegate determined that Mr. Harkat should not be allowed to remain in Canada based on the nature and severity of the acts he committed.

Harkat's lawyer, Barbara Jackman, told Al Jazeera she filed for a judicial review of his deportation order in November 2018. A number of interim procedural applications then followed before the court. Jackman applied to court seeking an enhanced hourly fee and the payment of experts’ fees, an application which was denied in June 2020 on the basis that Mr. Harkat had not appealed his denial of legal aid and had provided insufficient information to the court about his finances. A Special Advocate was then appointed for Mr. Harkat, someone who is entitled to review confidential information. The Special Advocate filed written submissions in the case with the court on March 9, 2023.

At the same time, Harkat has also been litigating the terms of his release and monitoring conditions. As of 2023, the Federal Court was continuing to order that Bell Mobility provide records of Mr. Harkat's telephone calls and SMS text messages to CBSA.

The substantive judicial review of Harkat's deportation order proceeded to a court hearing in 2024. The court held a case conference in May 2024 to determine a schedule for the resolution of the case. Mr. Justice John Norris of the court then issued a decision in June 2024 setting out the schedule for next steps in the proceeding. Specifically, the applicant's further affidavits, if any, were to be served and filed by September 13, 2024. The respondents' further affidavits, if any, were to be served and filed by September 30, 2024. Cross-examination on these affidavits was to be completed by October 11, 2024. The applicant's Further Memorandum was to be served and filed by October 18, 2024. The respondents' Further Memorandum was to be served and filed by November 15, 2024. The court hearing then took place in Toronto on December 3, 2024.

The court issued a letter on February 5, 2026 stating that the judge's decision was nearing completion and that the court's judgment and reasons would be provided to the parties on a confidential basis in order to provide the parties with an opportunity to make further submissions concerning any serious questions of public importance that may arise. A final draft of the Judgment and Reasons was released to the parties on April 10, 2026 on a confidential basis for them to provide submissions on whether serious questions of general importance arise in the case.

The instructions of the court were that if the parties had a joint position on whether serious questions of general importance arise, the wording of such questions was to be communicated to the Court no later than May 1, 2026. If the parties were unable to agree, they were to serve and file their respective positions no later than May 8, 2026. The respondent filed its representations on May 8, indicating that agreement was not reached.

In June 2026, the Federal Court issued its reasons setting aside the Minister's danger opinion decision as unreasonable.
