= Baroud (surname) =

Baroud (Arabic: بارود) is an Arabic surname. Notable people with the surname include:

- Abdul Rahman Ahmed Jibril Baroud (1937–2010), Palestinian poet
- Aziza Baroud (1965–2025), Chadian politician and diplomat
- Omar Baroud (born 1991/1992), Dutch-born actor and writer of Curaçao and Lebanese descent
- Ramzy Baroud (born 1972), American-Palestinian journalist and writer
- Wahid Khalil Baroud (born 1950), a stateless Palestinian former bodyguard
- Ziyad Baroud (born 1970), French-Lebanese civil servant and civil society activist
