= Protecting Canada's Immigration System Act =

Act of Parliament of Canada

- Protecting Canada's Immigration System Act

Parliament of Canada
- Long title: An Act to Amend the Immigration and Refugee Protection Act, the Balanced Refugee Reform Act, the Marine Transportation Security Act and the Department of Citizenship and Immigration Act.
- Citation: S.C. 2012, c. 17
- Considered by: House of Commons of Canada
- Considered by: Senate of Canada
- Royal assent: June 28, 2012

Legislative history

First chamber: House of Commons of Canada
- Bill title: Bill C-31
- Bill citation: Bill C-31
- Introduced by: Jason Kenney MP, Minister of Citizenship, Immigration and Multiculturalism
- First reading: February 16, 2012
- Second reading: March 23, 2012
- Third reading: June 11, 2012

Second chamber: Senate of Canada
- Bill title: Bill C-31
- Member(s) in charge: Yonah Martin
- First reading: June 11, 2012
- Second reading: June 13, 2012
- Third reading: June 27, 2012
- Conference committee bill passed by House of Commons of Canada: May 14, 2012
- Conference committee bill passed by Senate of Canada: June 21, 2012
- Status: Current legislation

Protecting Canada's Immigration System Act (French: Loi visant à protéger le système d’immigration du Canada), or Bill C-31, is an act of the 41st Canadian Parliament sponsored by the Minister of Citizenship, Immigration and Multiculturalism, Jason Kenney.

Introduced on 16 February 2012 and receiving Royal Assent on 28 June 2012, Kenney claimed that the bill is necessary to protect the refugee system, and that it would address the number of "bogus refugees" and claimants from European Union democracies. As such, the Act purposed to amend Canada's Immigration and Refugee Protection Act, Balanced Refugee Reform Act, Marine Transportation Security Act, and the Department of Citizenship and Immigration Act.

== Changes ==
The following changes were made by the bill:

- the immigration minister would have the power to choose which countries are safe without a committee including human rights experts
- rejected refugee claimants from countries on the safe country list would no longer be able to appeal the decision to the Immigration and Refugee Board
- claimants from countries on the safe country list would have to wait a year before applying for compassionate and humanitarian considerations to become permanent residents and could be deported in the meanwhile
- claimants from countries on the safe country list would be able to ask for a judicial review by the Federal Court, but could be deported before the court makes a decision
- biometric identification would be implemented for people that apply for visas to visit Canada

== Criticism ==
Don Davies criticized the bill, saying that it broke the compromise previously reached within the government and that it "puts too much power in the hands of the minister."

Amnesty International, the Canadian Association of Refugee Lawyers, the Canadian Civil Liberties Association, and the Canadian Council for Refugees called for the withdrawal of the bill, claiming that it has provisions that would give "Ministers broad, unfettered and unprecedented powers," and would:

…arbitrarily detain groups of refugees; keep parents, children and spouses apart for years; undermine the fairness of the refugee claim and protection process; introduce the use of biometrics; and authorize the stripping of permanent residence from refugees…

Human Rights Watch also criticized the bill, saying that "[s]ubjecting 16- and 17-year-old children to mandatory, unreviewable detention backtracks on Canada’s commitments to children," and that "[w]e believe it is impossible to make a blanket determination that any country is safe for everyone and would never produce a refugee."

== See also ==
- Canadian immigration and refugee law
