= Issam Al Yamani =

Issam Al Yamani (Arabic: عصام اليماني, romanized: ʻIṣām al-Yamānī) is a Palestinian living in Canada alleged by the Canadian government to have ties with the Popular Front for the Liberation of Palestine.

Born and raised in a Palestinian refugee camp in Lebanon, Al Yamani legally emigrated to Canada via Jordan in 1985, at which time he was granted permanent resident status. In 1988, he applied for Canadian citizenship. During this time he became the subject of an investigation by the Canadian Security Intelligence Service (CSIS). A report conducted in 1992 through Canada's Immigration Act authored by the Solicitor General and Minister of Immigration alleged that Al Yamani was a member of the Popular Front for the Liberation of Palestine. The report was sent to the Security Intelligence Review Committee, (SIRC). As a result of the report a security certificate was created for Al Yamani in 1993.

Al Yamani then applied for and was granted a judicial review of his case. Justice Mackay agreed with Al Yamani's Charter-based argument that a portion of the legislation used to charge him contravened his right to freedom of association. Based on this ruling the first security certificate against Yamani was dismissed.

In 1997 the SIRC issued a second certificate, which was also ended by the judge's ruling that their case had ignored key evidence on the accused's behalf.

In 2000 Al Yamani was informed that security proceedings against him would be dropped, but the Minister of Immigration began an inquiry in consideration of changes to the legislation that had occurred in 1993.

Al Yamani's attempt at a stay of the charges was denied in 2001, and a new application for his removal was begun shortly after, under regular immigration proceedings rather than the security certificate provision. Most recently a deportation order was issued for his removal on April 20, 2006. It has yet to be executed.
