= Robab Farahi-Mahdavieh =

Iranian political activist

- Allegiance: People's Mujahedin of Iran
- Conviction: Illegal entry
- Criminal charges: Providing logistical support for terrorist operations

Details
- Country: Canada
- State: Ontario
- Location: Ottawa
- Target: Embassy of Iran in Ottawa
- Date apprehended: 1992

Robab Farahi-Mahdavieh (Persian: رباب فرحی مهدویه) is a member of the People's Mujahedin of Iran (MEK) who was arrested by Canada in 1992, and in 1993, she was deported from Canada back to the United Kingdom on the grounds of national security. She was arrested under one of only 28 security certificates ever issued in Canada.

== Activities ==
=== Canada ===
Believed to be the leader of the MEK's North American operations, Canadian Security Intelligence Service (CSIS) identified her as their "chief fundraiser and recruiter" in Canada and a "leading female member". She was alleged to have organized the flash mob that attacked the Embassy of Iran in Ottawa, following Iranian airstrikes against MEK camps. 19 MEK members were pleaded guilty to various charges for the attacks that injured the Iranian ambassador and two other employees.

Her lawyer, Phil Rankin, told the press that "It’s a gross exaggeration to call this woman a terrorist. All she did was mastermind a demonstration that got out of hand". Pierre Denault, designated judge at the Federal Court of Canada ruled that Farahi-Mahdavieh's testimony lacked credibility and "It is enough that Mahdavieh admitted to being an active member of the MEK, and there is little doubt the group was involved in this specific attack". She was deported on 26 March 1993. Mahnaz Samadi, who filled her role leading the civilian wing of the MEK, was later deported from Canada in 2000 for acts of terrorism.

The case is notable among security certificate cases in Canada for how "civil or criminal rules of evidence are not applicable", and the judge decided to consider any evidence deemed reliable.

=== United States ===
She continued to act as a member of the MEK network in the United States. After the MEK has listed a Foreign Terrorist Organization (FTO) in 1997, she funneled money to American politicians. One of the first MEK contributions to Robert Torricelli came from her bank account in 1993, made out a $1,000 check to the Torricelli campaign. She listed her occupation as "Physician."
