= Closed Circuit (2013 film) =

2013 film directed by John Crowley

- Theatrical release poster
- Directed by: John Crowley
- Written by: Steven Knight
- Produced by: Tim Bevan; Eric Fellner; Chris Clark
- Starring: Eric Bana; Rebecca Hall; Riz Ahmed; Ciarán Hinds; Jim Broadbent
- Cinematography: Adriano Goldman
- Edited by: Lucia Zucchetti
- Music by: Joby Talbot
- Production company: Working Title Films
- Distributed by: Universal Pictures
- Release date: 1 November 2013
- Running time: 96 minutes
- Country: United Kingdom
- Language: English
- Box office: $6.3 million

Closed Circuit is a 2013 British political thriller drama film directed by John Crowley and written by Steven Knight. The film stars Eric Bana, Rebecca Hall, Ciarán Hinds, Jim Broadbent, and Riz Ahmed.

== Plot ==
A bomb planted in a lorry detonates in London's Borough Market killing 120 people. The London police receive an anonymous tip and arrest Farroukh Erdogan, a Turkish immigrant, as the terror cell leader and mastermind of the attack. Two other members of the cell die in the bombing and the fourth is killed by police in a shoot-out during the raid to apprehend him. When Erdogan's defence barrister commits suicide, Martin Rose is appointed by the Attorney General to replace him, joining special advocate Claudia Simmons-Howe. Due to national security concerns, Erdogan's case follows closed material procedures; Claudia represents Erdogan during closed sessions with a judge ruling what evidence is permissible for Martin to use in the open public trial. MI5 Agent Nazrul Sharma is assigned to provide Claudia with the closed material and monitor her activities.

Martin discovers that despite his extensive criminal record, Erdogan was somehow quickly approved for immigration from his previous residence in Germany to England and within six months was living well beyond his income. He finds proof that Farroukh Erdogan is really Mussi Kartal, a member of a terror cell responsible for bombing a U.S. Air Force base in Munich a few years previously. Kartal cut a deal with prosecutors to avoid prison, agreeing to work as an informant for MI5 by infiltrating the London terror cell and providing MI5 with information to make arrests. Martin suspects that after the Borough Market bombing, MI5 feared their botched operation would be publicly blamed as directly financing terrorism and sought to have Kartal take the fall and suppress any evidence of MI5 involvement. Martin and Claudia discussed the matters discreetly during the England national football team match at the Wembley Stadium.

In the first closed court session, MI5 Agent Melissa Fairbright reveals that Kartal's son Amir had hacked into his father's laptop and had provided valuable information to MI5. The judge orders Amir's testimony in court, deeming it relevant to the case. Amir, who is being monitored by MI5 agents at a safe house with his mother, manages to escape to his aunt's home. He meets with Martin and Claudia, giving them a flash drive detailing his father's involvement with the MI5 terror cell operation. Martin and Claudia realize MI5 will kill Amir to protect themselves and go on the run with him overnight, planning to have him testify in court the next day. Amir testifies in closed session, but Kartal is later murdered in prison and made to look like a suicide by hanging. With Kartal dead, the case collapses and all evidence of the MI5 operation is suppressed from public disclosure. Amir and his mother, however, are allowed to remain in England.

Three months later, as Martin and Claudia rekindle their romance that resulted in Martin's divorce from his wife, information of MI5's involvement in the Borough Market bombing is anonymously leaked to the media.

== Cast ==
- Riz Ahmed as MI5 Agent Nazrul Sharma
- Doug Allen as Ryan
- Eric Bana as Defense Barrister Martin Rose (named Vickers in earlier versions)
- Barbora Bobuľová as Piccola
- Jim Broadbent as Attorney General for England and Wales
- Kenneth Cranham as Cameron Fischer
- Anne-Marie Duff as MI5 Agent Melissa Fairbright
- Rebecca Hall as Special Advocate Claudia Simmons-Howe
- Isaac Hempstead-Wright as Tom Rose
- Ciarán Hinds as Devlin
- John Humphrys as himself
- Denis Moschitto as Farroukh Erdogan/Mussi Kartal
- Jemma Powell as Elizabeth
- Julia Stiles as Joanna Reece
- Angus Wright as Andrew Altman
- Luing Andrews as Belmarsh Guard

== Reception ==
On Rotten Tomatoes, the film has an approval rating of 43% based on reviews from 135 critics. The site's critical consensus states: "Slick and well acted, Closed Circuit unfortunately never quite works up a full head of steam, with a plot that's alternately predictable and full of holes." On Metacritic, the film has a score of 50 out of 100, based on 39 critics.

Peter Debruge of Variety called it a "slick, smarter-than-usual conspiracy yarn." Stephen Farber of The Hollywood Reporter wrote: "A couple of scenes toward the end do generate the suspense that the whole movie needed. But the impact is too muted, and an air of tired familiarity ultimately curdles the entire enterprise."

== See also ==
- List of films featuring surveillance
