= Law Union of Ontario =

Progressive lawyers' association

- Abbreviation: LUO
- Founded: 1974; 52 years ago
- Type: Legal society
- Headquarters: 25 Cecil St., Unit 310; Toronto, Ontario; M5T 1N1
- Region served: Ontario
- Website: lawunion.ca

The Law Union of Ontario is a coalition of over 200 progressive lawyers, law students and legal workers. The Law Union provides for an alternative bar in Ontario which seeks to counter the traditional protections afforded by the legal system to social, political and economic privilege. By demystifying legal procedures, attacking discriminatory and oppressive legislation, arguing progressive new applications of the law, and democratizing legal practice, the Law Union strives to develop collective approaches to bring about social justice.

== History ==
The genesis of the original Law Union was in the "Village Bar" formed in 1967 at the University of Toronto by activists including social activist and journalist June Callwood and law students Clayton Ruby and Paul Copeland to provide legal assistance to young people attracted to Toronto's Yorkville neighbourhood and soon also to the nearby Rochdale College which, at the time, were bohemian cultural centres and a focal point of the 1960s youth counterculture in Toronto, particularly hippie and radical students.

In 1968 and 1969, the Village Bar, staffed by law students and several lawyers, set up a table outside a convenience store on Yorkville Avenue and dispensed legal advice to young people in the area and particularly the growing colony of American draft dodgers and military deserters seeking refuge in Canada. After being called in to the Law Society of Upper Canada and told to cease and desist at once because the work they were doing would allegedly confuse the public who didn't know if they were law students or lawyers, and put the practice of criminal law into disrepute, they moved indoors to a trailer parked in a vacant lot near Yorkville.

Following a wave of arrests of participants in anti-Vietnam War protests in Toronto outside the American Consulate-General in May 1970, Copeland and Ruby, who were by this point law partners, and their associates, held meetings to organize a Law Union that summer. The new Law Union's first public act was to organize a demonstration in Toronto in October against the federal government's implementation of the War Measures Act during the October Crisis. Within a year the Law Union had disappeared due in part to the dissolution of Ruby and Copeland's legal partnership as the Law Union had largely been an extension of their firm.

In 1974, the idea of a law union was revived after a number of progressive lawyers, many of whom had previously been involved with the Village Bar or the original Law Union, worked together in the defence of workers and activists who had been arrested during a long and contentious strike at Toronto's Artistic Woodworking Plant the previous year. Planning meetings for a new Law Union were held throughout the year and on 29 September 1974 a general meeting was held officially founding the Law Union of Ontario. The organization had 100 members (40 lawyers and 60 students) by November 1974. It was described as being "leftist and progressive" by treasurer George Biggar.

== See also ==
- Clayton Ruby
- Paul Copeland
- Peter Rosenthal
- National Lawyers Guild
