= Fahad al-Shehri =

A Saudi citizen, Fahad al-Shehri was deported from Canada in 1997 on charges he had engaged in terrorism.

He was a known associate of Mohamed Harkat, a Canadian accused of links to the Armed Islamic Group of Algeria.
