= Mahnaz Samadi =

Iranian dissident and human rights activist

- Born: 1965 (age 60–61)
- Allegiance: People's Mujahedin of Iran
- Convictions: Act of terrorism (1982); Illegal entry (2000)
- Criminal charges: Providing logistical support for terrorist operations (2000)

Details
- Country: Iran, Canada, United States
- Date apprehended: 1982–1986; 1999–2000
- Imprisoned at: Evin Prison; Etowah County Jail, Alabama

Mahnaz Samadi (Persian: مهناز صمدی; born 1965) is a member of the People's Mujahedin of Iran (MEK).

== Activities ==
=== Iran and Iraq ===
Samadi joined the MEK in 1980 and was an active fighter for them during the 1980s. In 1982, she was accused of leading a terrorist attack against the Iranian government on behalf of the organization. Warren Creates, her lawyer in a 2000 case said she had been penalized for "bombings that were against legitimate targets". Samadi was imprisoned in Evin Prison for four years, and was released in 1986, before escaping from Iran. She became a commander of the military wing of the MEK based in Iraq, called the "National Liberation Army of Iran", and was responsible for training female fighters at Camp Ashraf. According to Mahan Abedin, she was also a chief liaison officer with the Iraqi Intelligence Service (IIS) of Saddam Hussein.

=== The United States and Canada ===
In 1993, she replaced Robab Farahi-Mahdavieh as the leader of North American operations of the MEK's civilian front. Samadi came to the United States in 1994, and was granted refugee status in 1996. She did not disclose her MEK ties to the authorities at the time she applied for it. According to Lorraine Adams of The Washington Times, she freely admitted her opposition to the Iranian government (which was already the basis for her seeking asylum) but when the application asked about membership in "any organizations or groups in your home country", she believed that the MEK's armed wing did not qualify as such because it was based in Iraq, hesitating to mention it. She lived as a permanent residence in California, and continued her activity with the organization. The Federal Bureau of Investigation (FBI) believes she was MEK's cell leader in Los Angeles for a short time, succeeding Golnaz Javaherisaatchi.

Samadi entered Canada illegally in November 1999 through a border crossing in Vancouver, and reportedly held secret meetings with several members of the MEK in Vancouver, Montreal and Ottawa. A report by Canadian Security Intelligence Service (CSIS) stated that she "was responsible for directing some MEK operations in Iraq" and that she was sent to Canada "to act in an organizational capacity", leading to her arrest in December 1999, in an apartment across the street from the new Embassy of the United States, Ottawa. The Ottawa Citizen carried a prominent front-page headline, "Secret arrest of a Saddam ally", with her illustration on 1 February 2000. The case quickly became a cause celebre for the MEK.

In order to be released of the costudy, she lied under oath to the Immigration and Refugee Board of Canada (IRB) about her membership in the MEK, denying being involved its military wing, and claimed to be in Canada "to see a sick aunt and visit friends" while admitting that she entered Canada illegally. The CSIS had provided the authorities with a picture of Samadi as a commander, published in a NLAI magazine. IRB adjudicator Rolland Ladouceur, found her testimony "neither credible nor trustworthy", and said "considering the evidence that Ms. Samadi [has] been a commander of the National Liberation Army, and considering that there are reasonable grounds to believe that this organization did engage in terrorist acts".

On 3 April 2000, Samadi was deported back to the United States. and was immediately arrested by the Immigration and Naturalization Service (INS) at the border. She was in custody at jails in Buffalo and Syracuse in New York, before being transferred to South Fulton, Georgia, and eventually to Etowah County, Alabama. According to court documents obtained by Newsweek, Samadi was charged with failing to disclose her "terrorist" past. There she applied for political asylum in July 2000, after her refugee status was revoked. Samadi was in danger of deportation to Iran, but several senior officials became involved to prevent the process.

John Ashcroft, serving in his then-capacity as Senator from Missouri, wrote a May 10 plea for lenience in her hearing to Attorney General Janet Reno, arguing that Samadi was a "highly regarded human-rights activist". Ashcroft also issued a joint statement with the MEK at a rally outside the UN building. Later, sixty-two members of the Congress demanded her release in June 2000. "[P]ressure from sympathetic members of Congress helped win her release", according to Aaron Sands of The Ottawa Citizen.

=== Departure from North America ===
According to a 2004 report by the FBI, Samadi was last seen in Washington D.C. in 2000, and unconfirmed reports allege that she was seen in Auvers-sur-Oise, France in 2001 and 2002. Mahan Abedin claimed in 2003 that she was in Camp Ashraf, Iraq.
