= Pacha Wazir =

Emirati citizen

- Arrested: 2002; United Arab Emirates; CIA
- Citizenship: United Arab Emirates
- Detained at: CIA black sites; Bagram Theater Internment Facility
- Charge: No charge
- Status: Transferred to Afghanistan in February 2010
- Occupation: Banker

Haji Pacha Wazir is an Emirati citizen who ran a series of Hawala banks before being arrested in 2003, amid accusations that he worked as the "main banker" for Osama bin Laden.

The Canadian Security Intelligence Service alleges that Mohamed Harkat was recorded on the phone with a "Haji Wazir" whom handled financial transactions for him, and described his bid to gain permanent resident status in Canada.

== Interrogation and Controversy ==
According to Rob Suskind, when Wazir was arrested and sent to a Central Intelligence Agency black site, he proved uncooperative and American officials illegally transferred his brother from Germany to the same site, and arrested his branch manager in Karachi. Members of the American Central Intelligence Agency posed as distant cousins taking over the business after Wazir's illness, and continued financial transactions, entrapping many of his colleagues as well.

However, in his book The Interrogator: An Education, Glenn Carle contradicts the claims Suskind made about Wazir. Carle was the CIA officer who handled the interrogation of Wazir, and according to his account, Carle concluded after the interrogation that Wazir cooperated and told the truth about his operations. Reporting on Wazir's story after the publication of Carle's book, Scott Horton for Harper's Magazine concludes, "The suggestion that Pacha Wazir was consciously managing bin Laden's financial affairs was then, and remains today, utterly baseless." Perhaps the most shocking part of Carle's account is that his conclusions about Wazir were ignored by his superiors at the CIA. As a result, it was not until February 2010 was Wazir released and sent home to Afghanistan.
