= Statutory Orders and Regulations =

Statutory Orders and Regulations (SOR) is a legal term and filing system that allows the Government of Canada to function by regulation subsidiary to legislation. SOR documents are published in the Canada Gazette.
