= Wahid Khalil Baroud =

Palestinian detainee

- Born: 1950; Gaza
- Arrested: June 6, 1994; Mississauga home
- Citizenship: Stateless Palestinian
- Detained at: Don Jail, Toronto; Toronto West Detention Centre
- Charge: threat to Canadian national security
- Penalty: deportation
- Spouse: Amal

Wahid Khalil Baroud (وحيد خليل بارود), a Palestinian alleged member of the Palestine Liberation Organization (PLO) Force 17, was arrested in Mississauga, Ontario, Canada, after it was claimed that he served as a bodyguard to PLO leader Yasser Arafat and engaged in coordinating PLO terrorist acts, and was a threat to Canadian national security. He was subsequently deported.

== Immigration to Canada ==
Baroud was a member of Al Fatah, but testified that he left the organization in October 1990.

In 1991, Baroud took his wife and three children to Greece. They then flew into Canada's Pearson International Airport with forged Egyptian passports, and applied for Canadian residency. The family, which would grow with the births in Canada of two more children, claimed to be Israeli, but Baroud acknowledged he had spent time in Fatah, saying that he had never been involved in any terrorism. He claimed to be defecting because he refused to follow an order to travel to Saudi Arabia's border with Iraqi-controlled Kuwait, where some allege he had been ordered to be killed by the PLO authorities. He stated that, as a Palestinian, he refused to be a party to another occupying power like Saddam Hussein.

He was held in detention for 41 days before it was determined he was not a threat, and he was subsequently released.

== Arrest ==
I am mindful of the fact the terms "terrorism" and "terrorist" are not defined in the Act. Counsel for the Ministers affirm in her written memorandum that "Like beauty, the image of a terrorist is, to some extent, in the eye of the beholder". While I accept this statement in general terms, it cannot prevent this court from examining whether, in the circumstances of this case, there are reasonable grounds...

— Judge Pierre Denault

Three years later, after he missed two immigration hearings which he claimed to have never received notice of, an arrest warrant was issued and he was declared a threat to Canadian national security under the auspice that he had served in Fatah's Force 17 as a bodyguard to Palestine Liberation Organization leader Yasser Arafat, and was stationed in Syria, Lebanon, Libya, and Greece and engaged in coordinating PLO terrorist acts. He was arrested on a security certificate signed by Canadian Immigration Minister Sergio Marchi and Solicitor General Herb Gray based on information provided by the Canadian Security Intelligence Service on June 6, 1994.

Pursuant to the Immigration Act, the certificate was referred to the Federal Court of Canada, Trial Division, to determine whether the certificate should be quashed. There, on May 31, 1995, Judge Pierre Denault declined to quash the certificate. Judge Denault held that there were reasonable grounds to believe that Baroud is or was a member of an organization that there were reasonable grounds to believe is or was engaged in terrorism. Baroud argued that section 40.1 of the Immigration Act was unconstitutional and breached the Canadian Charter of Rights and Freedoms.

When the Canadian courts upheld his deportation, he sought leave to appeal to the Supreme Court, claiming that the Canadian Security Intelligence Service (CSIS) had tried to convince him to become an informant and turned against him when he refused, but was denied on June 15. "Depressed and discouraged" at his long time spent in the Toronto Don Jail, Baroud agreed to voluntarily drop his appeals and allow himself to be removed from Canada and was subsequently moved to Toronto West Detention Centre.

== Deportations ==
His wife and three eldest children were granted refugee status in Canada.

Since he was a stateless Palestinian, there was no country to which he could be safely deported, and his wife ended up acquiring an entry visa for him to Algeria, and he was put on a plane to Algeria on July 5, but returned to Canada a week later after Algerian authorities refused to let him enter. It was later revealed that his Canadian escorts had taken him to Casablanca hoping to leave him in Morocco; but while they were themselves "mistakenly left behind" in the North African country, Baroud had simply booked himself a plane back to Canada.

In December 1995, his wife secured a 9-month visa for him to the Sudan, and Canada put him on a plane towards the country - however, Sudan refused to accept him when they learned of the case. He was forced to live in airports for eight months, shuttling between countries.

Some sources suggest he ended up in Syria. Baroud later flew to Romania where he lived in the airport for a number of months before finding his way to Switzerland where he appealed to the Supreme Court for the right to remain. He finally settled in Belgium and is welcomed as a Belgian citizen.
