= Mohammad Zeki Mahjoub =

Canadian-Egyptian accused of terrorism

Mohammed Zeki Mahjoub (Arabic: محمد زكي محجوب) (also Abu Ibrahim, Mahmoud Shaker) is an Egyptian national who was arrested in May 2000 on a security certificate for his alleged membership in the Vanguards of Conquest.

Although he has not been charged in Canada, the Canadian Security Intelligence Service (CSIS) has stated that they believe he will "engage in or instigate the subversion by force of the government of Egypt" if allowed free. However, CSIS has refused to provide any public evidence to substantiate its claims. Because he faces a risk of torture if returned to Egypt, he has remained in Canada, essentially in a state of limbo. As of 2020, Mahjoub was continuing to contest his deportation in Canadian court.

== Life ==
Following his graduation from the University of Zagazig in Egypt, Mahjoub says he served in the Egyptian military, but faced persecution and torture from the civil police force due to his "religious beliefs". He stated that he had tried to leave Egypt but was refused by state security; until June 1991 when he applied to leave the country as part of the Hajj pilgrimage to Saudi Arabia. Following the pilgrimage, he went to Sudan in August.

Mahjoub spent five months looking for work as an agricultural engineer specializing in land reclamation, and believed it was his lack of experience that prevented him from finding a job. Eventually he met an unidentified man at a Sudanese mosque and mentioned that he was looking for work . The man worked for an agricultural firm named Al-Thimar al-Mubaraka, and secured Mahjoub an interview with Osama bin Laden in Khartoum. Bin Laden met with Mahjoub for 90–120 minutes, and told him that he'd been interviewing other agricultural engineers, but none that specialised in reclamation. He noted Mahjoub's lack of experience, and told him to take a week to study the needs at the Al-Damazin Farms, which included 4,000 seasonal workers tending nearly a million acres (4,000 km²), and then decide whether he felt the job was right. Mahjoub met with Mubarak al-Duri, and agreed to sign on as the project's Deputy General Manager.

On October 17, 1993, al-Duri wrote Mahjoub a reference letter vouching for his work with the farms in al-Damazin from February 1992 until May 1993. Mahjoub says he left the job following an argument about his comparatively low wages compared to other employees in the firm, and that despite his 10-hour shifts. He was often asked to work overtime up to 8 hours a day, and that bin Laden asked some mutual colleagues to offer Mahjoub back his job with a higher salary several times; he has had no contact with any of them since leaving Sudan in 1995.

== In Canada ==
On December 30, 1995, he entered Canada as a refugee using a forged Saudi passport he bought for CAD $2,500, and admitted he had been arrested several times in Egypt due to his brief association with a member of the Muslim Brotherhood. For the first three weeks of his stay in Canada, Mahjoub stayed with the in-laws of Ahmed Khadr. Although he initially told CSIS that he didn't know Khadr, he later explained that "everyone knows Khadr", and that his wife was close friends with Khadr's wife.

His refugee status was granted on October 24, 1996. Around this time, he received a number of phone calls from Vancouver, BC resident Essam Marzouk. He would later deny having contact with Marzouk, but at the time of his arrest, was carrying a paper with the name "Esam" reading "105 10277 135th St. Box 150 Surrey B.C. V3T 4C4", a former address of Marzouk. He subsequently said that he had lied earlier, and his contact with Marzouk had been about some luggage lost on his flight to Canada. In 1998, he was introduced to Essam Marzouk at the house of Ahmed Khadr's in-laws in Toronto. Marzouk made a number of phone calls to Mahjoub, although Mahjoub denied knowing him in a 1998 interrogation.

He still had Mubarak al-Duri, his old supervisor at the Sudanese farm project, in his address book with two UAE contact phone numbers - with a note scrawled beneath reading August 12, 1998, for which he could not identify the significance; but insisted that he hadn't been in contact with al-Duri since leaving the Sudan. However, following his arrest, officers found a letter to Mahjoub signed by al-Duri postmarked with that date, speaking about how he'd invested money Mahjoub gave him and requesting any future business ideas, and giving him his postal box address in Dubai and fax, cellular and home telephone numbers; the latter two which were the ones entered in Mahjoub's address book.

In November, Mahmoud Jaballah spoke to a colleague and was informed that a man matching Mahjoub's description had moved to Toronto, whom both had known in Afghanistan. Jaballah said that he was a shrewd and manipulative man who had worked directly under Abdel Hamid, believed to be a reference to Vanguards of Conquest leader Kamel Agiza, which CSIS maintains would make Mahjoub the second-in-command of the militant organisation. At his arrest, it was discovered that Mahjoub's contact list contained the name Abu Ahmed ("Father of Ahmed") associated with 289-2361, Ahmed Jaballah's phone number.

While in Egypt, likely under torture, Agiza confessed that Mahjoub was a member of al-Jihad. In the 1999 case of the Returnees from Albania, an Egyptian military court sentenced Mohammed Mahjoub in absentia to 15 years imprisonment.

Mahjoub was closely monitored by security forces from at least December 1998, when CSIS argues he "exhibited security consciousness" by looking over his shoulder three times while speaking on a payphone. Similarly in May 1999, CSIS argues that Mahjoub acted guilty, looking back several times while boarding a bus at the local shopping mall. In January 2000, he told a colleague that he prefers face-to-face communication because of "the Mukhabarat". In total, Mahjoub was interviewed by CSIS six times before his arrest, August 8 and October 24, 1997, then on January 13 and January 20, 1998, as part of the immigration screening process, and again about his connections to the Vanguards of Conquest on October 5, 1998, and March 31, 1999.

== Arrest ==
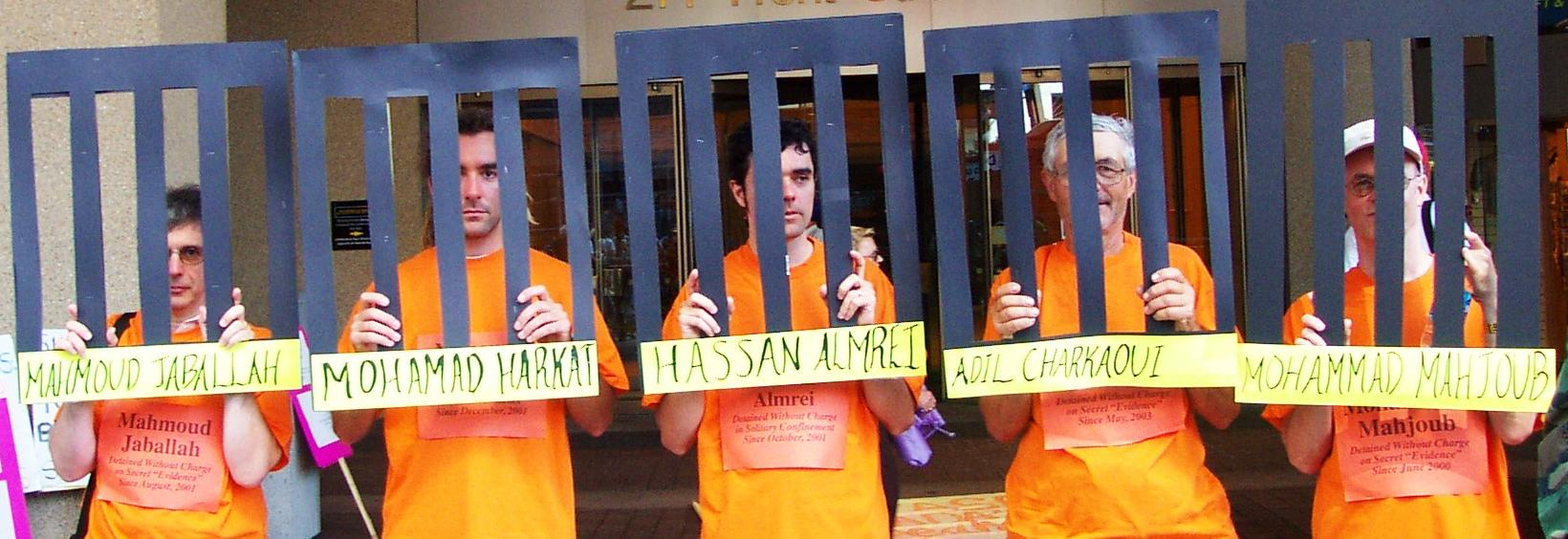
Mohammad Zeki Mahjoub is represented in a 2004 protest outside the Toronto office of CSIS.

On May 17, 2000, Solicitor General Lawrence MacAulay signed a security certificate calling for Mahjoub's detention on the basis of a Security Intelligence Report provided to him. On June 12, Elinor Caplan, Minister of Citizenship and Immigration, provided the necessary second signature. He was arrested either June 12 or July 7. At the time of his arrest, he was carrying a slip of paper with Marzouk's former address, 105 10277 135th St. Box 150 Surrey B.C. V3T 4C, printed on it, and later confessed he had indeed known him.

On October 5, the Federal Court of Canada upheld that the certificate was reasonable. While in prison, Mahjoub contracted hepatitis C.

In January 2005, judge Eleanor Dawson stated that there was no evidence suggesting Mahjoub was a danger to Canada simply because he had worked on a farm owned by bin Laden and had met people such as Khadr. She stated the deportation order against Mahjoub was "patently unreasonable" since he would face torture or death if returned to Egypt. That summer, Mahjoub began a hunger strike, consuming water, juice and occasional broth, lasting 76 days and losing 110 lb (50 kg) before he was hospitalised.

== Release ==
On February 15, 2007, the Federal Court ruled that he was to be released, noting in particular his failing health and the lack of risk he presented to Canadian society. Fitted with a tracking bracelet, he was escorted to his Toronto home, now modified to allow court restrictions on his activities, on April 12.

A month after his release, he asked to be placed back in prison, since he felt that the constant surveillance and harassment meant that his entire family now suffered. He was told that since he was not charged with any crime, he could not be placed back in prison.

In December 2008, CSIS revealed that it had been wiretapping phonecalls between Mahjoub and his lawyer, in contravention of solicitor-client privilege. Jaballah and Mahjoub filed a joint motion alleging that the conditions of their house arrest were unreasonable; stating their tracking-bracelets, wiretapped phones and curfews were acceptable intrusions on their lives, while having their family photographed and physically followed at every opportunity and their mail seized were unreasonable. Judge Anne MacTavish ruled against this motion.

As of March 2009, Mahjoub is again incarcerated at Kingston's Immigration Holding Centre. This was done at his own request, as he explained on March 19 to Federal Court Justice Simon Noel that he could no longer subject his family to the intolerable and humiliating invasions of their privacy that the conditions of his house arrest required.
