= Al-Damazin Farms =

- Interactive map of Al-Damazin Farms
- Coordinates: 12°N 34°E

The Al-Damazin Farms, about 300 miles (480 km) south-east of Khartoum, Sudan, was an "enormous" farm owned and run by Osama bin Laden.

Bin Laden received the land on which the farms were based in payment by the Sudanese government for construction work he had performed. The farms employed thousands of people. The farms had cattle and horses, and grew white corn, sesame, soybeans, sorghum, and peanuts.

Mohammad Zeki Mahjoub was hired by bin Laden, between February 1992 and May 1993, to supervise 4,000 employees at the farms.

Al-Qaeda held "refresher courses" in small arms and explosives on the farms.
