= National Intelligence Council =

The National Intelligence Council may refer to:

- National Intelligence Council (Japan)
- National Intelligence Council (United States)
