= Paul William Hampel =

Pseudonym of an alleged Russian spy who operated in Canada

Paul William Hampel is the fictitious name of a man accused by the Canadian government of being a Russian spy masquerading as a Canadian citizen. He was arrested on November 14, 2006 at Pierre Elliott Trudeau International Airport at about 6 p.m. just prior to boarding a plane departing Canada. When he was arrested, he had in his possession a fraudulent Ontario birth certificate, Can$7,800 in five currencies, a shortwave radio, index cards with detailed notes about Canadian history, two digital cameras, three cell phones and five cell phone sim cards, some of them password-protected.

He was detained under a security certificate, signed by Public Safety Minister Stockwell Day and Immigration Minister Monte Solberg. According to the National Post, the certificate asserts that the individual "was a foreign national engaged in espionage, a member of an espionage organisation and 'a danger to the security of Canada.'" Specifically, he is suspected of being an elite agent in the SVR, Russia's Foreign Intelligence Service. A Federal Court judge has found the certificate reasonable and ordered Hampel to be expelled from Canada. In order to speed up the deportation, Federal Court Justice Pierre Blais made a deal with the accused to seal the man's real name because of concerns for the safety of his family. In exchange, Hampel will not contest deportation to his homeland.

Hampel has admitted through his lawyer "that he is not Paul William Hampel, that he is a Russian citizen, born on October 21, 1961, and that he has no legal status in Canada." He does not admit to being a spy.

Hampel started an "emerging markets" consultancy in Dublin, Ireland, but the business was stagnant in recent years. In 1997, Hampel set up in Dublin a company called Emerging Markets Research and Consulting Limited, and put one million dollars of capital into the company; however, the company never filed any returns. The company formed part of a business empire that Hampel controlled, and which operated in Sark, Belgrade, Cyprus and Canada.

Hampel frequently traveled to Balkans and published a book of photographs, My Beautiful Balkans.
