= Immigration and Refugee Protection Act =

2002 Canadian legislation

Immigration and Refugee Protection Act (IRPA)

Parliament of Canada
- Long title: An Act respecting immigration to Canada and the granting of refugee protection to persons who are displaced, persecuted or in danger
- Citation: S.C. 2001, c. 27
- Assented to: 1 November 2011
- Commenced: 28 June 2002
- Administered by: IRCC; CBSA
- White paper: Immigration and Refugee Protection Regulations

Legislative history
- Bill title: Bill C-11
- First reading: 21 February 2001
- Second reading: 27 February 2001
- Third reading: 13 June 2001
- Committee report: Report 1 - Bill C-11, An Act respecting immigration to Canada...
- First reading: 14 June 2001
- Second reading: 27 September 2001
- Committee report: Report 2 - Hands Across the Border: Working Together at Our Shared Border and Abroad to Ensure, Security and Efficiency

Repeals
- Immigration Act, 1976
- Status: Current legislation

The Immigration and Refugee Protection Act (IRPA) (French: Loi sur l’immigration et la protection des réfugiés, LIPR) is an Act of the Parliament of Canada, administered by Immigration, Refugees and Citizenship Canada (IRCC) and Canada Border Services Agency (CBSA), that replaced the Immigration Act, 1976 in 2002 as the primary federal legislation regulating immigration to Canada. The "Immigration and Refugee Protection Regulations" (IRPR) specify how provisions of IRPA are to be applied.

Coming into force on 28 June 2002, the Act created a high-level framework detailing the goals and guidelines the Canadian government has set with regard to immigration to Canada by foreign residents. The Act also sprouted controversy regarding the government's failure to implement a component of the legislation that would have established a Refugee Appeal Division as part of Canada's immigration system.

The minister of public safety and emergency preparedness, who oversees agencies such as the CBSA, is responsible for administrating the Act as it relates to examinations at ports of entry (POEs); enforcement, including arrests, detentions, removals, and policy establishment; and inadmissibility on the grounds of security, organized criminality, or violation of international rights (incl. human rights). The minister of immigration, refugees and citizenship, who oversees the IRCC, is responsible for governing the Act overall.

The Immigration and Refugee Board of Canada (IRB) is an independent administrative tribunal that is responsible for making well-reasoned decisions of immigration and refugee matters, efficiently, fairly, and in accordance with the law.

== Constitutionality ==
In the 2007 case of Charkaoui v. Canada (Citizenship and Immigration), Chief Justice Beverley McLachlin held that certain aspects of the scheme contained within the Act for the detention of permanent residents and foreign nationals on the grounds of national security violate s. 7 of the Canadian Charter of Rights and Freedoms by "allowing the issuance of a certificate of inadmissibility based on secret material without providing for an independent agent at the stage of judicial review to better protect the named person’s interests."

McLachlin concluded that "some of the time limits in the provisions for continuing detention of a foreign national violate ss. 9 and 10(c) [of the Charter] because they are arbitrary." The Government of Canada responded by introducing a revised security certificate regime in the Act that includes the use of special advocates to review a summary of the evidence without being able to share this information with the accused. The bill to amend the Act was passed by Parliament with support from the Conservative and Liberal caucuses and received royal assent in 2008.

== Regulations ==
=== Regulations made under IRPA ===
The regulations that were made under this Act include:

- Adjudication Division Rules (SOR/93-47)
- Federal Courts Citizenship, Immigration and Refugee Protection Rules (SOR/93-22)
- Immigration and Refugee Protection Regulations (SOR/2002-227)
- Immigration Appeal Division Rules (SOR/2002-230)
- Immigration Division Rules (SOR/2002-229)
- Ministerial Responsibilities Under the IRPA Order (SI/2015-52)
- Oath or Solemn Affirmation of Office Rules (Immigration and Refugee Board) (SOR/2012-255)
- Order Designating the Minister of Citizenship and Immigration as the Minister responsible for the administration of that Act (SI/2001-120)
- Preclearance in Canada Regulations (SOR/2019-183)
- Protection of Passenger Information Regulations (SOR/2005-346)
- Refugee Appeal Division Rules (SOR/2012-257)
- Refugee Protection Division Rules (SOR/2012-256)
- Regulations Designating a Body for the Purposes of paragraph 91(2)(c) of IRPA (SOR/2011-142)

=== Repealed regulations made under IRPA ===
The regulations that were repealed under this Act include:

- Convention Refugee Determination Division Rules (SOR/93-45)
- Oath or Solemn Affirmation of Office Rules (IRB) (SOR/2002-231)
- Refugee Protection Division Rules (SOR/2002-228)
- Order Setting Out the Respective Responsibilities of the Minister of Citizenship and Immigration and the Minister of Public Safety and Emergency Preparedness Under the Act (SI/2005-120)

== See also ==
- Canadian immigration and refugee law
- Protecting Canada's Immigration System Act
- Temporary foreign worker program in Canada
