= Hassan Almrei =

Syrian refugee

Hassan Ahmed Almrei
- Born: 1974 (age 51–52); Syria
- Citizenship: Syrian
- Detained at: Toronto West Detention Centre
- Alleged to be a member of: possibly al-Qaeda

Hassan Ahmed Almrei (Arabic: حسن أحمد المرعي also childhood name Abu al-Hareth) (born in Syria on January 1, 1974), a Syrian citizen, arrived in Canada in 1999 claiming refugee status. He has been since held, and accused of terrorist connections and ideology, for his "reputation... for obtaining false documents", and his relationship with Ibn al-Khattab following time shared together during the Civil war in Tajikistan. He had "not supported Khattab financially or otherwise", but "admired Khattab... had pictures of Khattab on his computer; and visited Chechen extremist websites".

The Canadian Security Intelligence Service (CSIS) has also alleged that Almrei has demonstrated a "devotion to Osama bin Laden and his ideals... by fighting in Afghanistan", although he fought Communist-backed troops and rival forces in Afghanistan between 1990 and 1994 while bin Laden was still living in the Sudan. He has argued that it is "gross stereotyping" to suggest that every person who fought the Soviets in Afghanistan must therefore support Osama bin Laden. He claims to believe al-Qaeda is "contrary to the teachings of Islam", and refers to them as a terrorist organisation which participates in unjustified violence. CSIS claims that his role as a soldier in both Afghanistan and Tajikistan prove that he believes in "guns and violence" nevertheless.

After a special prison was built for the five long-term prisoners held on security certificates, four were released on bail and house arrest terms, leaving Almrei as the sole occupant of the prison which continued to operate at a cost of $2.6 million annually to house Almrei alone. He was ordered released under house arrest by a Federal Court judge on January 2, 2009. On December 14, 2009, he was further released and not considered a suspect anymore. The evidence against him was based on informants' tips, wiretaps, and his admission of travel to places like Afghanistan and Pakistan. The case against him was based on outdated and sketchy knowledge of Al Qaeda and other extremist Islamic groups, and loaded with information that "could only be construed as unfavourable to Almrei without any serious attempt to include information to the contrary."

== Life ==
Although born in Syria, Almrei's family moved to Dammam, Saudi Arabia when he was 7 since his paternal uncle had been sentenced to ten years' imprisonment for his role in the Muslim Brotherhood - his father was sentenced to death in absentia in Syria, as he worked as a teacher in Saudi Arabia. He has eight siblings in Saudi Arabia, and one sister who moved to Lebanon with her husband. He memorised the Quran while he was young.

He claims to have been self-employed since February 1990 when he finished high school, though he later stated that he'd spent several months doing office work for the charitable Muslim African Agency following graduation.

He later explained that he had traveled towards Afghanistan, after using his father's contacts in the Muslim Brotherhood to purchase a forged Syrian passport, to attend a Jalalabad camp run by Abdul Rasul Sayyaf, a commander in the Northern Alliance. However, he contracted malaria and remained in a guest house called Bait al-Ansar in Peshawar for a year before attending Sayyaf's camp, where'd he trained on an AK-47 with a group named Ittihad-i-Islami. He made three subsequent trips into Afghanistan to stay at the camps under Sayyaf's leadership, using his savings to finance the third trip.

In 1994 left Sayyaf's company and traveled to Kunduz to follow Ibn al-Khattab instead, and met Nabil al-Marabh.

Almrei claims he traveled to Pakistan to investigate business possibilities selling honey and perfume. He was in Pakistan from November 1994 through March 1995, and went to Yemen in March 1995. He also claims to have traveled twice in Tajikistan during the year, where he scouted on Soviet positions for Ibn al-Khattab, and although he was willing to fight in combat, he claims he served chiefly as an Imam to the group and was never involved in any major combat, though he saw several skirmishes. When Khattab moved on to fight in the First Chechen War, he would still phone and fax Almrei with updates on the struggle.

He has stated that he closed his business from as early as 1996 to as late as January 1998, and was unemployed from thence on.

Although New York Times reporter Judith Miller claimed that he used his honey business to smuggle money for militants, analysts say there is no evidence to support that and Almrei has raised issue with Miller's history of controversy. After her story was published, he claimed that he sold chiefly perfume and oud, but later stated that he sold primarily honey, importing 500 kg from Pakistan.

He unsuccessfully tried to immigrate to Canada with his Syrian passport #3286630 on April 19, 1998, stating that he wished to visit Hisham Al Taha in Richmond, British Columbia. He later claimed to have never spoken to al Taha and that he'd just put down his name on the advice of a friend who told him it would improve his chances of being accepted for a visa.

He traveled to Thailand in August 1998, where he met a Palestinian people smuggler named Ghaled whom he befriended given his own reputation for acquiring false passports.

== In Canada ==
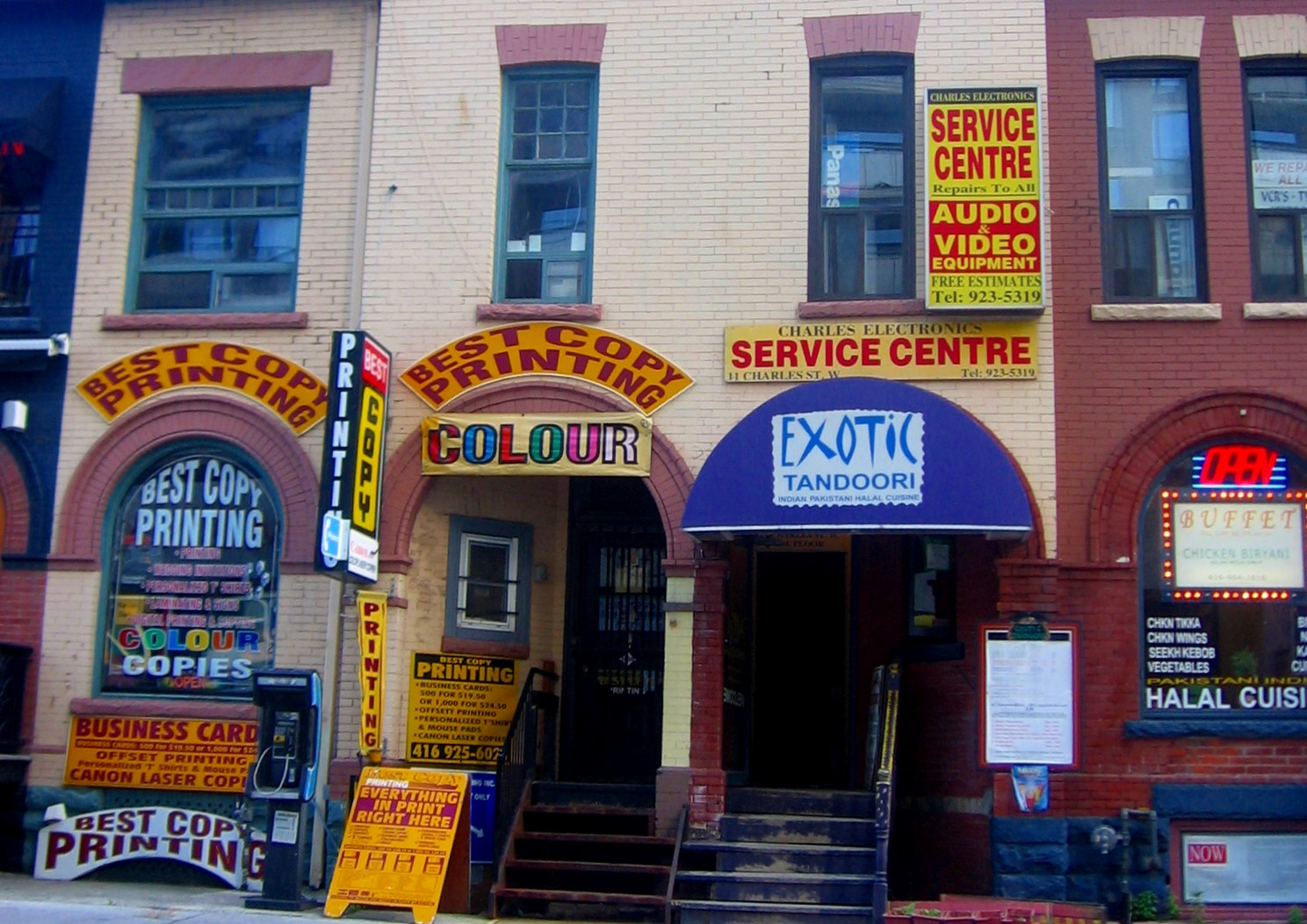
The shop where al-Marabh and Almrei met.

On January 2, 1999, he flew to Toronto Pearson International Airport from Jordan. Upon landing he claimed that he had used a forged passport from the United Arab Emirates and had destroyed it. He was picked up at the airport by his "good friend" Ahmed Al Kaysee, whom he'd met while in Afghanistan.

In September 1999, Almrei and five other men had been in a restricted portion of Pearson Airport, as they "appeared to have access cards and codes". The explanation has been offered that these six men were working in the airport at temporary jobs, and their credentials were legitimate. He also maintained contact with the Thai smuggler. Attending Jami Mosque, Almrei met Ibrahim Ishak, who introduced himself as a Bosnian immigration consultant. Almrei later directed two people seeking help acquiring G-class driver's licences to Ishak, who paid him for the referral.

Within months of arriving, he had become close friends with Hassan Ahmed, and would help him with his fruit stand, where he initially had trouble speaking to female customers due to his religious upbringing; but later began to flirt openly with them as his religious stance relaxed. He suggested that he was interested in finding a prospective wife. Ahmed would later register a cell phone for Almrei in his name.

Almrei says he was contacted by al-Marabh, from the Kunduz guesthouse, while the latter was still living in the United States, and was asked to help him acquire a false passport for C$2,000. He says that since al-Marabh introduced himself as "Abu Adnan", he did not immediately recognise that it was him. Almrei used his childhood name, "Abu al-Hareth", during the transaction. The two met at the Toronto copy store owned by al-Marabh's uncle, Ahmed Shehab, where a number of prominent forged identity cards were later found - and Almrei sold him the fake passport. Almrei says he was later asked to find a second passport for him, but refused.

After al-Marabh was arrested trying to illegally enter the United States hiding in a tractor trailer, Almrei visited him in the Thorold prison, and collected money from colleagues to loan him C$2,500 for bail. The Royal Canadian Mounted Police investigated Almrei's procurement of the false passport, but opted not to press charges.

He was granted refugee status in June 2000, stating that he feared persecution in Syria due to his father's alleged membership in the Muslim Brotherhood.

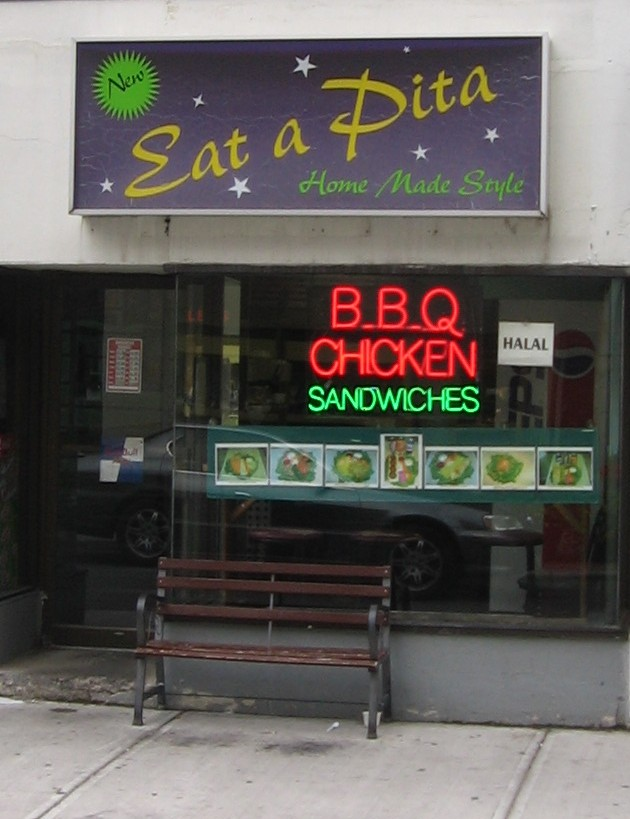
Almrei's "Eat a Pita" restaurant in Toronto.

In January 2000, Almrei purchased a Middle Eastern eatery named Eat-A-Pita for C$22,000. One of his employees who was working "under the table" due to her visa restrictions, asked Almrei if he knew any men who might enter a marriage of convenience if she offered them C$4,000 to allow her to remain in the country. Knowing that Ishak, whom he'd met a year earlier at the mosque, was in need of money, Almrei informed him of the proposal, and the pair had a civil marriage at city hall as well as a formal Islamic marriage at the mosque, and Almrei served as a witness to both marriages. Almrei also drafted a fake reference letter from his restaurant to indicate that Ishak was an employee, to help support his case for sponsoring his new wife to become a Canadian. On September 13, 2000, Almrei's residence was searched and the forged passport was discovered. Ishak was stopped in Detroit while flying back to Canada on January 14, 2001, and charged with carrying bundles of fake identification and a crimping machine. Ishak returned to Bosnia, withdrawing his sponsorship of Almrei's former cashier. Feeling personally responsible, Almrei paid her back the C$4,000 Ishak had taken, out of his own pocket in October 2001, when he learned that Ishak was convicted of scamming prospective emigrants in Bosnia.

Friends spoke of Almrei as having poor financial sense, and often had to borrow money. In August 2000, Almrei sold the restaurant for $18,500. He reported becoming depressed and being unemployed for a while, until a friend had to travel overseas due to his father's death, and asked Almrei if he would run his business for several months. He was paid with a used van, and used it to find work making restaurant deliveries throughout the city, earning $800–1000 monthly. His cell phone was cut off due to lapsed payments, and he sometimes drove uninsured because he could not afford the payments.

== Arrest ==
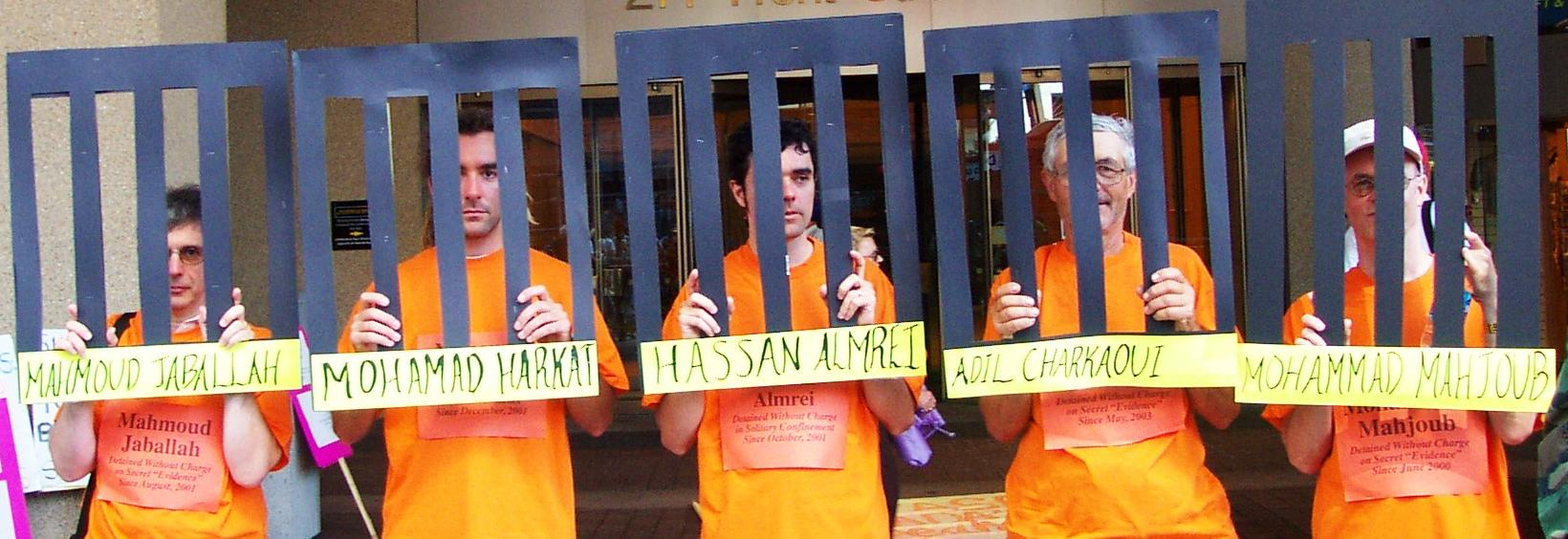
Hassan Almrei is represented in a 2004 protest outside the Toronto office of CSIS.

On October 19, 2001, Almrei was brought to his lawyer's office for a CSIS interview; where he again reiterated his travels and denied having ever been to Sudan, Afghanistan, Tajikistan, Uzbekistan, Azerbaijan, Dagestan or Chechnya. He was also confronted with the fact that photographs of Ibn Khattab, Osama bin Laden and Mohamed Atta were found on his computer, though he protested that agents were taking them out of context and had simply been photos from news agencies such as BBC which were included in online stories he had read, and were saved in his web cache. He was arrested on a security certificate nevertheless, and the following month judge Danièle Tremblay-Lamer found the certificate "reasonable". On November 10, 2002, he retracted part of his statement and said that he had worked as an Imam in Afghanistan but worried that in the wake of the terrorist attacks the truth would be incriminating. He also said that he had been tasked to run a girls' school in Tajikistan by Al Haramin.

While at the Toronto West Detention Centre, he staged two hunger strikes - a 39-day fast that succeeded in ensuring winter clothing and shoes in his cell during the winter, and a 73-day fast calling for an hour of exercise per day. During the first strike, guards at the prison had offered to slip him some shoes against the rules, but he refused and said he would wait until the court ruled he was legally entitled to them.

In 2003, Almrei, who volunteered as a janitor in the prison, witnessed a prison guard being assaulted by an inmate and intervened, helping to pull the attacker off the officer and then hitting an emergency button to call other guards to assist. Subsequently, he carries a stigma and requested he be allowed to remain in solitary confinement rather than released into the general prison population, as he maintained the guards were his "friends".

In 2005 he mentioned that he'd lost respect for his friend Al Kaysee, who had remained friends up until the day of Almrei's arrest, and since then had not even asked mutual friends how he was faring, muchless visited him in prison. He spent most of his time in prison watching the CPAC Parliamentary channel, and said he did not harbour a grudge against Canada for his treatment since he came from Saudi Arabia and Syria which have even fewer human rights.

In April 2006, he was moved to a new detention facility at Millhaven Institution, specifically meant to house those held under security certificates.

=== Applications for release ===
At his first application for bail release, in June 2003, it was proposed that Almrei, who has no family in Canada, could live with Dr. Diana Ralph and her partner Jean Hanson, who spent C$38,000 renovating their basement apartment to accommodate Almrei and offered C$10,000 in cash towards the bail amount. As evidence that Almrei was not an extremist, Ralph pointed out that he had accepted her, a Jewish lesbian, as a close friend and had told her that only God could judge people.

At Almrei's second application for release, in 2005, he attracted the attention of Alexandre Trudeau, who offered to post C$5000 after meeting him while filming a documentary on the security certificate issue. He was again requesting to be released to Ralph and Hanson who volunteered to coach him towards studying at the University of Toronto. In addition, his close friend Hassan Ahmed offered to post C$3000 in bail. Elizabeth and Francis Barningham put forward C$10,000 as did Frank Lloyd Showler, a retired human rights activist. Imam Ali Hindy offered C$28,000, Matthew Barents offered C$2500, professor Sharon Aiken offered C$1000 and another five people also donated C$100 or less, including Member of Parliament Alexa McDonough.

At his third application for release in 2007, Almrei was supported by two new Members of Parliament who offered to act as sureties and post bail for him, Bill Siksay (C$10,000) and Andrew Telegdi (C$500), while McDonough again reiterated symbolic support ($250) and Trudeau again offered C$5000, while Ralph and Hanson increased their bail offer to C$60,000. Erma Wolfe also offered C$3000 and suggested Almrei could live in the basement apartment attached to her house. And Hindy, the local Imam, gathered C$15,000 from the local Muslim community to contribute. On October 5, Justice Lemieux dismissed the application noting that the proposed bail conditions were "wholly inadequate".

In Carolyn Layden-Stevenson's ruling rejecting the second application, she quoted a confidential CSIS agent named only as P.G. as having testified about Ahmed Khadr dying in 2004, when he actually died in 2003. He also stated that he "was not aware" of any detainees in Guantanamo or elsewhere who had not "take[n] up terrorist activities" once they were released, even though 279 detainees had been released from Guantanamo alone, of whom between 3-30 were alleged to have taken up militant activities upon their release. Another CSIS agent identified only as J.P., the Deputy Chief of Counterterrorism and Counterproliferation in the Ottawa Regional Office as of 2005, testified against the petitions for release by Almrei, Jaballah and Charkaoui. J.P. also testified that the Peshawar guest house had been "associated with al-Qaeda... since 1984", although even the most liberal estimates suggest that the group did not exist until 1988–1990.

Almrei was ordered released under house arrest by Federal Court Justice Richard Mosley on January 2, 2009, under strict monitoring conditions including an electronic tracking leg-bracelet. This judge was a federal assistant deputy justice minister who helped draft Canada's post 9/11 anti-terror laws before being appointed in 2003.

=== Release ===
On December 14, 2009, more than eight years after his arrest, the same judge who ordered his house arrest disposed the security certificate against him. The judge concluded that the evidence – both secret and public – against him did not hold up to scrutiny. While there were "reasonable grounds to believe that Hassan Almrei was a danger to the security of Canada when he was detained in 2001" he concluded that "there are no longer reasonable grounds to believe that he is a security risk today". In a comment this was paraphrased: what was reasonable in 2001 because much was unknown, was not reasonable anymore in 2009,

The court was critical of CSIS and the federal ministers of Public Safety and Immigration, who signed a new certificate in 2008 against Almrei and four others. Mosley said CSIS and the ministers "breached their duties of utmost good faith and candour to the court by not thoroughly reviewing the information in their possession, prior to the issuance of the February 2008 certificate."

Earlier in 2009, another judge threw out a security certificate against Adil Charkaoui, after the Canadian Security Intelligence Service withdrew secret evidence, fearing its disclosure would jeopardize its sources.
