= Danièle Tremblay-Lamer =

Canadian judge

Judge of the Federal Court of Canada
- In office July 2, 2003 – August 31, 2017

Personal details
- Born: November 2, 1946 (age 79) Quebec City, Quebec, Canada
- Spouse: Antonio Lamer 1987-2007
- Education: Laval University and University of Ottawa

Danièle Tremblay-Lamer (born November 2, 1946) is a former judge of the Federal Court of Canada.

== Biography ==
Tremblay-Lamer was born in Quebec to Laurette and Marcellin Tremblay. She graduated from College de Français in Montreal, Laval University and University of Ottawa. She was called to the Quebec bar in 1982.

Tremblay-Lamer was married to former Chief Justice Antonio Lamer from 1987 until his death in 2007.
