= Security certificate =

Canadian legal mechanism for deportation

In Canada, a security certificate is a legal mechanism by which the Canadian government can detain and deport permanent residents and all other non-citizens (i.e., foreign nationals) living in Canada.

It is authorized within the parameters of the Immigration and Refugee Protection Act (IRPA; which replaced the Immigration Act, 1976), specifically sections 33 and 77 to 85. It was amended and took on its present structure in 1991, with an additional amendment in 2002. According to Public Safety Canada, the overarching agency dealing with the law, the security certificate provision has existed in "one form or another for over 20 years." Its use has been documented at least as far back as 1979, the year after they were implemented. Since 1991, only 27 individuals have been subject to certificate proceedings.

The federal government may issue a certificate naming a foreign national or any other non-citizen suspected of violating human rights, of having membership within organized crime, or is perceived to be a threat to national security. Subjects of a certificate are inadmissible to Canada and are subject to a removal order. Where the government has reasonable grounds to believe that the individual named in the certificate is a danger to national security, to the safety of any person or is unlikely to participate in any court proceedings, the individual can be detained. The entire process is subject to a limited form of review by the Federal Court.

On 23 February 2007, the security certificate process was found to be in violation of sections 7, 9, and 10 of the Canadian Charter of Rights and Freedoms and ruled unconstitutional by the Supreme Court of Canada in the landmark Charkaoui case. The Supreme Court suspended the effect of its ruling for one year. On October 22 that year, the Harper government introduced a bill to amend the security certificate process by introducing a "special advocate," lawyers who would be able to view the evidence against the accused. However, these lawyers would be selected by the Justice minister, would only have access to a "summary" of the evidence, and would not be allowed to share this information with the accused, for example in order to ask for clarifications or corrections. The amendments are modelled on a much-criticized process already in use in the United Kingdom. The bill amending Canada's security certificate regime, with support from the Conservatives and the opposition Liberal Party, was passed by Parliament and received Royal Assent in February 2008, just days before the court-imposed deadline.

In its 2014 decision for Mohamed Harkat following Charkaoui v Canada, the Supreme Court found the framework to protect classified information in immigration proceedings to be consistent with the Charter.

== Issuing and reviewing a certificate ==
Certificates are governed by the Immigration and Refugee Protection Act (IRPA), prepared by the Canadian Security Intelligence Service (CSIS), and signed by the Solicitor General of Canada (ministerial post superseded by the Minister of Public Safety) or the Minister of Citizenship and Immigration when a non-citizen, either a permanent resident, refugee or foreign national located in Canada, is deemed to be inadmissible on the grounds that the subject is suspected to be a threat to national security, or has violated human rights abroad, or is involved with organized crime. The signed certificate is then referred to a Federal Court judge who reviews the evidence prepared by CSIS. Hearsay is admissible as evidence. All or part of the evidence may be heard in secret, in the absence of the subject of the certificate, if the judge deems that airing it publicly may hurt national security or put the safety of any individual at risk. There is no provision for such evidence or precise allegations to be revealed to the subject being detained or to his or her lawyer, though the judge may provide a summary of the evidence provided. Key terms, such as "national security", are not defined in the Act.

If the judge determines that the certificate is not "reasonable" (the order of proof used in security certificate cases), the certificate is quashed. If the judge decides that it is "reasonable", then the certificate becomes a removal order. IRPA states that the Federal Court's decision can be appealed "only if the judge certifies that a serious question of general importance is involved and states the question."

== Detention and deportation ==
For refugees and refugee claimants, the person whose name is mentioned in the certificate must undergo automatic detention, but there is no scope of applying for a bail within 120 days after the Federal Court judge endorses the certificate. For Permanent Residents, if the government has some reasonable cause to believe that the individual whose name is mentioned in the certificate poses a risk to the national security or safety of any other individual or refuses to take part in any court proceedings, then the individual may be put under detention; however, he/she may seek a bail after six months of detention.

An individual may be held for several years, without any criminal charges being laid, before the review is completed.

In practice, the fact that there is often a risk of torture on the one hand, and a limited legal opportunity to challenge detention, on the other, has meant that named individuals are neither released from prison nor deported after the certificate is upheld.

Amnesty International wrote of several security certificate detainees on 2 February 2007, “Their detention has truly become tantamount to being indefinite as they have limited choices: either remain detained while continuing to pursue legal challenges to the unjust procedure that governs their cases, or agree to be returned to countries where Amnesty International believes they face a serious risk of torture.”

A recent trend has been towards releasing detainees under strict conditions or transferring them to house arrest.

People named under certificates are exempted from legal provisions designed to prevent deportations to risk of torture or other human rights abuse. The government's position, following its interpretation of the Supreme Court Suresh ruling, is that a named individual can be deported even if it is found that they risk torture or death.

== Issued security certificates ==
When individuals are found to be inadmissible but are already in the country, their removal is not always immediate: those still remaining in Canada while under security certificates, they are kept in detention or released under court-ordered conditions. These individuals are monitored by the Canada Border Services Agency. As of 2019, there were currently two individuals released under court-ordered conditions. Between 2012 and 2020, there was one person detained by grounds for detention.

=== Outstanding security certificates ===
The security certificate of Adil Charkaoui was quashed in October 2009 by the Federal Court. That of Hassan Almrei's was quashed in December 2009. Three others remain imprisoned under house arrest.

The conditions of the three people subject to outstanding certificates are as follows:

- Mohammad Zeki Mahjoub, an Egyptian detained in Toronto since June 2000, was ordered released under house arrest by a Federal Court judge on 15 February 2007. Because Mahjoub and his wife, Mona El Fouli, found that his conditions of house arrest "had humiliated them and deprived their two sons of any semblance of a normal life," he requested to be returned to custody at the Kingston Immigration Holding Centre in March 2009. He was on hunger strike in protest of his conditions there since 1 June 2009. Mahjoub was released from prison into house arrest in January 2010. He continues to fight for his freedom through legal action.
- Mahmoud Jaballah, an Egyptian detained in Toronto since August 2001. In 2006, the case of Jaballah v Canada (Minister of Public Safety and Emergency Preparedness) challenged the constitutionality of detention under the certificate. The Federal Court upheld the detention and it is currently on appeal. On 6 March 2007, Jaballah was ordered to be released under house arrest by a Federal Court judge, and remains under strict house arrest while he continues to fight his legal case.
- Mohamed Harkat, an Algerian held in Toronto since December 2002 and released on bail in June 2006. He was placed under 24-hour supervision by his wife and must wear an electronic monitoring device. He was ordered deported in July 2006 but remained in Canada as court battles continued until the Supreme Court struck down the legislation in February 2007. A new security certificate was issued in February 2008 under new legislation. This certificate was upheld by Federal Court Justice Simon Noel on 9 December 2010, almost eight years to the day of his original arrest. Harkat is currently fighting the deportation order.

=== Past security certificates ===
In addition to the three people who currently have cases pending, 20 others have been charged under Security Certificate legislation since 1991.

- Hassan Almrei, a Syrian refugee who was detained in a Toronto jail in October 2001. He was transferred to the Kingston Immigration Holding Centre in April 2006. He has held several prolonged hunger strikes, the longest lasting over 100 days. He was ordered released under house arrest by a Federal Court judge on January 2, 2009. The Federal Court quashed the certificate in December 2009. Almrei launched a suit of the Canadian government in February 2010.
- Adil Charkaoui, a Moroccan-born Montrealer detained from May 2003 until February 2005, when he was freed on strict conditions of release. The Supreme Court of Canada's decision for Charkaoui v Canada (Minister of Citizenship and Immigration) in 2007 became a turning point for Security Certificates, concluding that the use of secret evidence under security certificates violated section 7 of the Charter. The Canadian government was given one year to amend the current law which resulted in the introduction of special advocates. Charkaoui's Security Certificate was lifted in September 2009 after the government withdrew evidence rather than disclose it on Court orders. Charkaoui is suing the Canadian government in a bid to hold government officials accountable and to clear his name.
- Manickavasagam Suresh, a Sri Lankan, first arrested in 1995 and held til 1998. He was ordered deported, but ongoing court processes kept him in Canada under conditions. The certificate against him was annulled when the Supreme Court struck down the security certificate legislation in February 2007, and the government did not issue a new certificate against him when new legislation went into effect in February 2008.
- Ernst Zündel, a German permanent resident of Canada since 1958 was arrested in May 2003 and deported to Germany in March 2005.
- Mourad Ikhlef, an Algerian living in Montreal who gained refugee status in 1994, was arrested in December 2001 and deported in February 2003, when he was handed over directly to Algerian intelligence services. He was tortured and imprisoned based on information obtained during his torture.
- Iqbal Singh, an Indian refugee living in Toronto who gained status in 1993, was arrested in April 1998 and deported to Belize in January 2000.
- Hani Abdul Rahim al Sayegh was arrested in March 1997 and deported in June 1997 to the U.S. Subsequently he was deported in 1999 to Saudi Arabia to face criminal charges.
- Aynur Saygili, a non-status refugee from Turkey, living in Montreal, was arrested in November 1996, and deported to France in August 1997.
- Djafar Seyfi, an Iranian refugee who gained status in 1995, was arrested in September 1996 and deported later the same year.
- Effat Nejati, also known as Shahla Moharrami, was Iranian non-status refugee living in Toronto. She was arrested in August 1996 and deported to Britain in November of that year.
- Yelena Borisovna Olshanskaya (alias Laurie Catherine Mary Lambert and her husband Dmitriy Vladimirovich Olshanskiy (alias Ian Mackenzie Lambert) were Russian nationals, arrested in May 1996 and deported in June of that year.
- Satkuneswaran Kandiah, a Sri Lankan national who resided in Montreal was arrested October 1995 and disappeared before his court hearing.
- Wahid Khalil Baroud, a Palestinian who resided in Toronto, was arrested in June 1994, and deported in 1995 to Sudan.
- Hardeep Singh, also known as Maan Singh Sidhu, was an Indian national arrested in June 1994 and deported January 1995.
- Mohammed al-Husseini, a Lebanese status refugee who resided in Montreal was arrested in 1993, and deported in 1994.
- Issam Al Yamani, a Palestinian permanent resident, was investigated after applying for citizenship in 1988. Between the years of 1993 and 2000 Yamani was named in two separate security certificate investigations, both of which were quashed by judges. Deportation proceedings were subsequently re-initiated under normal immigration procedures and the matter is still before the courts
- Mansour Ahani, an Iranian was arrested in June 1993 and deported in January 2002. Ahani was held for the nine years in which he unsuccessfully fought against his charges.
- Saleh Mousbah Zakout, a Palestinian, was arrested upon his arrival in Toronto in 1993 and deported the following year.
- Robab Farahi-Mahdavieh, an Iranian, was arrested in 1992 and deported to Britain in March 1993.
- Parvin Khassebaf, an Iranian, arrested in August 1993 and deported to France in September of that year.
- Mahmoud Abu Shandi, a Palestinian living in Montreal, was arrested in October 1991 and deported in February 1992, first to Algeria, then Libya.
- Joseph and Sarah Smith, Iraqi citizens, arrested in 1991 at a Toronto airport as they disembarked from their plane. They were subsequently released due to the removal of their certificate, and able to claim refugee status.
- Paul William Hampel, alleged to be a Russian spy using a pseudonym, was arrested on November 14, 2006, at a Montreal Airport after a security certificate, naming the individual in question, was signed by Public Safety Minister Stockwell Day.

== Criticisms ==
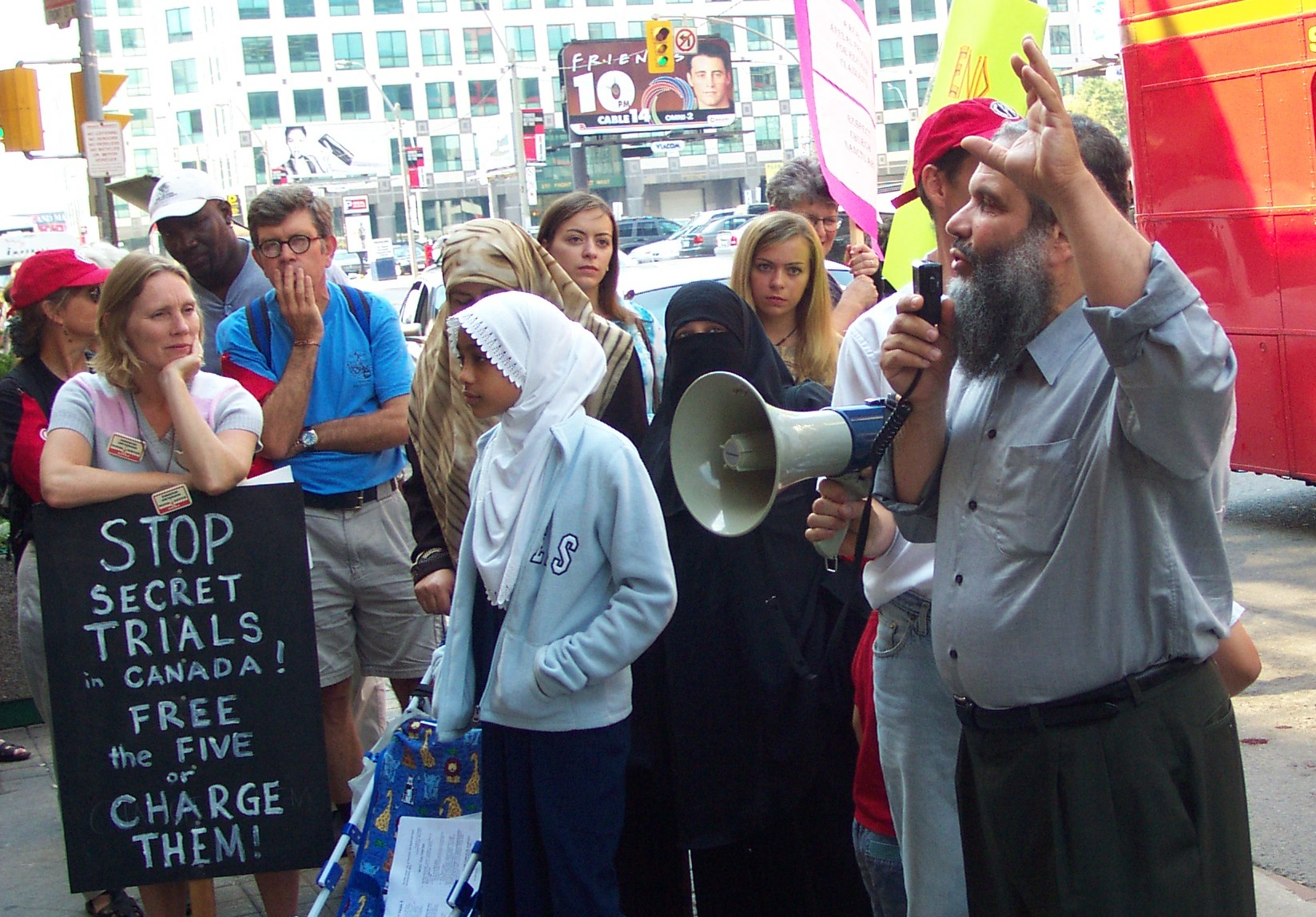
A 2004 protest by Christian Peacemaker Teams outside the Toronto office of CSIS.

The families of the detainees, supported by thousands of individuals across Canada, have campaigned against the security certificate, arguing that they violate the guarantees of equality and fundamental justice enshrined in the Canadian Charter of Rights and Freedom, creating a two-tiered justice system and allowing individuals to be detained indefinitely, on the basis of secret suspicions, under threat of deportation to torture.

Criticism related to violations of civil liberties and due process include the fact that allegations are vague and general, key terms are not defined, precise allegations do not exist or are not disclosed, the low order of proof effectively reverses the burden of proof so that the named person has to prove his innocence, the lack of disclosure of information in the file, the fact that information provided to the court can include hearsay and is known to have included information produced under torture, the fact that evidence has been tainted by destruction of evidence by CSIS, and the lack of appeal.

Alexandre Trudeau, son of former Prime Minister Pierre Trudeau, has been vocal in his criticisms of the certificates and has appeared in court to testify in favour of Hassan Almrei's and Adil Charkaoui's release, offering to act as a surety on their behalf. Other well-known figures who have joined the campaign against security certificates include Warren Allmand, former Solicitor General of Canada; Flora MacDonald, former Foreign Affairs Minister of Canada; Denys Arcand; Bruce Cockburn; Naomi Klein; and Maude Barlow.

The Canadian Bar Association, Amnesty International Canada, Human Rights Watch, and the Canadian Council for Refugees are among the organisations who have taken a position against security certificates.

Members of Parliament from all major political parties in Canada have criticised the measure and called for its abolition. Several have offered to become a surety to some of the detainees. The New Democratic Party has called for the abolition of the measure.

Three United Nations committees—the Committee Against Torture, the Working Group on Arbitrary Detention, and the UN Human Rights Committee—have condemned the security certificate process and called on Canada to reform its legislation. They called on Canada to use criminal law instead of immigration law to deal with its security concerns.

In the wake of the Charkaoui decision, a new campaign is developing to call on the government to refrain from introducing new legislation. A pan-Canadian "day of action" against the introduction of new security certificate legislation was organized on 20 October 2007. It is supported by over 60 organizations and networks, including national unions, migrant justice groups, student organizations, feminist groups, human rights organizations, development associations, community groups, political parties and faith-based organizations.

At the end of 2018-19, there were three active civil cases brought against the Canadian government by individuals formerly under security certificates, filing for a range between $16 million and $37.4 million among them.

== Constitutionality ==
In 2002, the Supreme Court of Canada upheld the security certificate process as constitutional in Suresh v Canada. The Court ruled that the operative provisions of the security certificate process do not violate Section 7 of the Charter, but that the Immigration Act generally does not allow for the deportation of a person to a country where they will likely be tortured. The Court did rule that deportation to countries suspected of torture may be justified in "exceptional circumstances." The court declined to define those circumstances, instead stating that "The ambit of an exceptional discretion to deport to torture, if any, must await future cases."

On 13–14 June 2006, the Supreme Court heard three different appeals from Adil Charkaoui, Hassan Almrei, and Mohamed Harkat regarding the constitutionality of the security certificate process. Most of the appellants have argued that the refusal to disclose the evidentiary basis of the certificate violates Section 7 of the Charter. Counsel for Charkaoui also argued that the security certificate process violates judicial independence, the rule of law, and sections 9, 10, 12, and 15 of the Charter of Rights and Freedoms.

On 23 February 2007, the Supreme Court released its decision of Charkaoui v. Canada (Minister of Citizenship and Immigration). It voted unanimously that the process of certificate review which prohibited the accused from seeing evidence against them violated the Charter. Legislative amendments have been made by the Government of Canada to bring Canada's security certificate regime in compliance with the Court's ruling and were passed in February 2008.

The case of Mahmoud Jaballah, in Jaballah v Canada (Minister of Public Safety and Emergency Preparedness), challenged the constitutionality of detention under the certificate in 2006. The Federal Court upheld the detention. It is currently on appeal.

In its 2014 decision for Mohamed Harkat following Charkaoui v Canada, the Supreme Court found the framework to protect classified information in immigration proceedings to be consistent with the Charter.

== See also ==
- Security risk certificate – a similar mechanism in New Zealand
