= Terrorism in Canada =

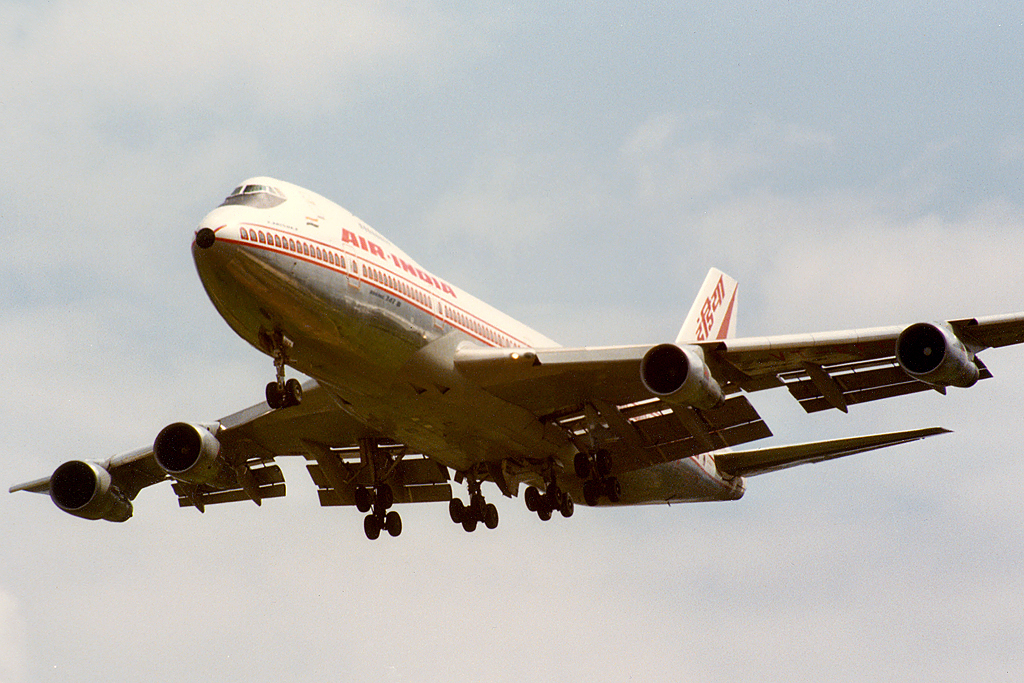
The aircraft involved in the bombing of Air India Flight 182, which killed 329 people. The incident was the deadliest terrorist attack in Canadian history.

Terrorism and mass attacks in Canada includes acts of terrorism, as well as mass shootings, vehicle-ramming attacks, mass stabbings, and other such acts committed in Canada that people may associate with terroristic tactics but have not been classified as terrorism by the Canadian legal system. (For example, the 2018 Toronto shooting was a mass shooting that law enforcement officials did not connect to terrorism.)

The Criminal Code of Canada defines terrorist activity to include an "act or omission undertaken, in or outside Canada, for a political, religious or ideological purpose, that is intended to intimidate the public with regard to its security, including its economic security, or to compel a person, government or organization (whether in or outside Canada) to do or refrain from doing any act, and that intentionally causes one of a number of specific forms of serious harm." As such, some of the terrorist acts listed here are related to external events and nationalities, while others, such as the FLQ crisis in 1970, are related to internal tensions within the country.

Matters relevant to overall counterterrorism in Canada, as well as national security within the federal government, fall under the jurisdiction of the Minister of Public Safety and Emergency Preparedness, who heads Public Safety Canada (PSC). Two other ministers with particularly crucial roles with respect to counter-terrorism are the Ministers of Foreign Affairs and of National Defence.

The Canadian government uses the National Terrorism Threat Level (NTTL) to identify the probability of terrorism occurring in Canada. As of 22 May 2021, Canada's current threat level is "Medium," which means that a "violent act of terrorism could occur;" it has been at this level since October 2014.

== Overview of legal framework and response ==
Overall issues of national security fall under the jurisdiction of the Minister of Public Safety and Emergency Preparedness, who heads Public Safety Canada (PSC). While provincial and territorial governments are responsible for general law enforcement and criminal prosecutions, the Royal Canadian Mounted Police (part of the PSC portfolio) is given primary responsibility, under the Security Offences Act (SOA), for the investigation of offences involving national security.

Canadian federal statutes establish a legal regime that prosecutes terrorists for their activities. The Public Prosecution Service of Canada (PPSC), under the Attorney General of Canada, prosecutes offenses on behalf of the Canadian government, including those involving national security such as terrorist activities. If a person carries out a terrorist attack or instructs someone else to carry out a terrorist attack, they are given a life sentence. Anyone who facilitates a terrorist attack is liable to imprisonment for no more than 10 years.

The Criminal Code defines terrorist activity to include an "act or omission undertaken, in or outside Canada, for a political, religious or ideological purpose, that is intended to intimidate the public with regard to its security, including its economic security, or to compel a person, government or organization (whether in or outside Canada) to do or refrain from doing any act, and that intentionally causes one of a number of specific forms of serious harm."

The Combating Terrorism Act, which came into force in July 2013, renewed parts of the Criminal Code by creating four new offences intended to prevent and deter individuals from leaving Canada for particular terrorism-related purposes.

Canada's Anti-Terrorism Act (ATA) "provides measures for the Government of Canada to create a list of entities that: have knowingly carried out, attempted to carry out, participated in or facilitated a terrorist activity" or "knowingly acted on behalf of, at the direction of or in association with an entity that has knowingly carried out, attempted to carry out, participated in or facilitated a terrorist activity." The Act specifically provides that "for the Governor in Council to establish by regulation a list on which, on the recommendation of the Minister of Public Safety, any entity may be placed." The ATA replaced the Official Secrets Act with the Security of Information Act (SOIA), which focuses on "conduct harmful to, or likely to harm Canada." It also defined the concept of "harm to Canadian interests" to address a broad range of potential harms, including terrorist activity, interference with critical infrastructure, and the development of weapons of mass destruction in contravention of international law.

Terrorist financing, on the other hand, is addressed through the Proceeds of Crime (Money Laundering) and Terrorist Financing Act, as well as the Income Tax Act and the Charities Registration (Security Information) Act. In terms of the cross-border movement of potential threats, assessing the admissibility of those applying for temporary or permanent residence, or refugee status is facilitated under the Immigration and Refugee Protection Act (IRPA).

The Department of Foreign Affairs and International Trade Act provides the Minister of Foreign Affairs with responsibility over all matters relating to the conduct of Canada's external affairs, including countering international terrorism and responding to terrorist incidents abroad. Moreover, the Government of Canada lists state supporters of terrorism under the State Immunity Act, which (like the JVTA) revokes certain legal immunities from listed countries, allowing civil suits to be filed against those countries in Canadian courts for loss or damage resulting from its involvement in terrorism anywhere in the world. In 2012, both Syria and Iran were listed.

In terms of emergency response, leadership of the Public Safety Minister is granted by the Emergency Management Act.

=== Redress ===
The Justice for Victims of Terrorism Act (JVTA) allows Canada's victims of terrorism to sue perpetrators and those that support them for loss or damage that occurred as a result of an act of terrorism committed in Canada or abroad. Similar to the JVTA, amendments made to the State Immunity Act, allow for countries listed by the federal government as state supporters of terrorism to be sued in Canadian courts for loss or damage resulting from its involvement in terrorism anywhere in the world.

On 1 May 2006, the Government of Canada announced the launch of a full public inquiry into the Air India Flight 182 bombing and its investigation. Initiated later in June, the inquiry was to look into the ways in which Canadian law restricted funding terrorist groups, how well witness protection is provided in terrorist cases, if Canada needs to upgrade its airport security, and if issues of co-operation between the RCMP, CSIS, and other law enforcement agencies had been resolved. It was to also provide a forum wherein families of the victims could testify on the impact of the bombing and would not repeat any criminal trials.

From 1 December 2011 to 31 July 2012, families of the passengers and crew who died on Air India Flight 182 on 23 June 1985 have been offered a one-time ex gratia payment by Canadian government, as "a demonstration of solicitude and recognition for the administrative disdain families experienced in the years following" the tragedy. Payments have been made to eligible applicants for 275 victims. Moreover, every June 23, some Canadians observe National Day of Remembrance for Victims of Terrorism to honour the victims.

=== Emergency response ===
In terms of emergency response, leadership of the Minister of Public Safety is granted by the Emergency Management Act. The chief means through which the Public Safety Minister facilitates their emergency response is through the Government Operations Centre (GOC). The GOC, on behalf of the federal government, supports response coordination across the government and others.

In practice, the immediate response to terrorist incidents in Canada is to be led by local law enforcement and emergency management authorities. This involves the RCMP as being the first police responder in those provinces and territories where it provides local police services. Particular terrorist incidents may involve specific responses from designated agencies; for instance, under the National Defence Act or through the Crown Prerogative, the Canadian Armed Forces can be called upon to respond directly to terrorist incidents in Canada. As such, the Minister of National Defence plays a key role in preparation for, and execution of, any deployment of Canadian Forces in response to terrorist activity domestically or abroad.

Immediately following the 2001 September 11 attacks in the United States, the RCMP initiated Project Shock which sought to quickly collect and act on any information or intel related to possible threats posed by Muslims in Canada. Project Thread was a police operation in 2003 that resulted in the arrest of 24 immigrants in the Greater Toronto Area amidst allegations that they formed a threat to national security, and maintained "suspected ties to al-Qaeda."

== Counter-terrorism in Canada ==
Matters relevant to overall counter-terrorism in Canada, as well as national security within the federal government, fall under the jurisdiction of the Minister of Public Safety and Emergency Preparedness, who heads Public Safety Canada (PSC). Two other ministers with particularly crucial roles with respect to counter-terrorism are the Ministers of Foreign Affairs and of National Defence. Additionally, the National Security Advisor (NSA) is responsible for providing information, advice, and recommendations on security and intelligence to the Prime Minister; co-ordinating the security and intelligence community; and overseeing intelligence assessment.

Claiming that the safety and security of Canadians to be its first priority, the Government of Canada puts significant attention towards its counterterrorism efforts. "Building Resilience Against Terrorism" (2013) is Canada's first counterterrorism strategy, which aims to counter domestic and international terrorism so to protect Canada, Canadians, and Canadian interests. The strategy "assesses the nature and scale of the threat, and "sets out basic principles and elements that underpin the Government's counter-terrorism activities."

The Canadian government uses the National Terrorism Threat Level (NTTL) to identify the probability of terrorism occurring in Canada. As of 22 May 2021, Canada's current threat level is "Medium," which means that a "violent act of terrorism could occur;" it has been at this level since October 2014. More specifically, this means that "extremist groups and individuals located in Canada and abroad, have both the intent AND capability to carry out an act of terrorism in Canada."

=== Counter-terrorism organizations and jurisdictions ===
Federal government organizations that have a hand in counterterrorism in Canada include:

- Canadian Security Intelligence Service (part of Public Safety Canada)
  - CSIS Global Operations Centre (CGOC)
  - Integrated Terrorism Assessment Centre (ITAC)
- Department of National Defence/Canadian Armed Forces
  - Canada Command — provides coordination with other federal departments and agencies, as well as domestic and international partners, in responding to national security events.
  - Communications Security Establishment
    - Canadian Centre for Cyber Security — a national center for "cyber security readiness and response, exclusive of federal government information technology and information management systems"
  - Defence Research and Development Canada
    - Centre for Security Science
  - Joint Task Force 2 (JTF 2) — a special forces unit of the Canadian Special Operations Forces Command, that exists to "protect the Canadian national interests and combat terrorism and threats to Canadians at home and abroad."
- Royal Canadian Mounted Police (part of Public Safety Canada) — the primary agency responsible for national security law enforcement across Canada. The RCMP also conducts extraterritorial investigations of terrorist activity when committed against a Canadian citizen or by a Canadian citizen abroad. Among other things, the RCMP also operates:
  - Counter-terrorism Information Officer initiative — provides first responders with "terrorism awareness training on key indicators of terrorist activities, techniques and practices in order to help detect threats at the earliest stage possible."
  - Integrated National Security Enforcement Teams (INSETs)
  - National Operations Centre — a secure and integrated 24/7 command and control centre for centralized monitoring and coordination during "critical incidents and major events"
- Government Operations Centre (part of Public Safety Canada) — the chief means through which the Minister of Public Safety facilitates their emergency response. On behalf of the federal government, the Centre supports response coordination across the government and others.

In terms of broader counterterrorism intelligence, other federal organizations also collect information in support of their primary responsibilities; this includes:

- Canada Border Services Agency (part of Public Safety Canada)
- Global Affairs Canada
- Financial Transactions and Reports Analysis Centre
- Transport Canada
  - Canadian Air Transport Security Authority (CATSA)
- Charities Directorate (Canada Revenue Agency)

==== Intelligence assessment ====
The Canadian Security Intelligence Service, part of Public Safety Canada, is Canada's primary national intelligence agency. Among other things, CSIS compiles the information they collect themselves with information from other sources to provide Parliament with intelligence assessments on terrorist threats. The National Security Advisor (NSA) is responsible for providing information, advice, and recommendations on security and intelligence to the Prime Minister; co-ordinating the security and intelligence community; and overseeing intelligence assessment.

The Integrated Terrorism Assessment Centre (ITAC) is a cooperative initiative, housed at CSIS, to facilitate intelligence information sharing and analysis within the Canadian intelligence community and to first responders, such as law enforcement. Its assessments integrate intelligence from across departments and agencies as well as from external partners. Similarly, the RCMP's Integrated National Security Enforcement Teams (INSETs) bring together federal, provincial, and municipal police and intelligence resources "to collect, share, and analyze information in support of criminal investigations and threat assessments."

The Communications Security Establishment, administered under the Department of National Defence (DND), is responsible for foreign signals intelligence (SIGINT) and protecting government electronic communication networks.

The Privy Council Office's Security and Intelligence Secretariat provides policy support to the NSA, the Prime Minister, and the Clerk of the Privy Council, as well as coordinating committees on security and intelligence issues. The PCO's International Assessment Staff (PCO IAS) helps to coordinate "the efforts of the Canadian assessment community and provides PCO and other senior government clients with policy-neutral assessments of foreign developments and trends that may affect Canadian interests."

==== Terrorist financing ====
Terrorist financing in Canada is addressed through the Proceeds of Crime (Money Laundering) and Terrorist Financing Act (PCMLTFA), as well as the Income Tax Act and the Charities Registration (Security Information) Act, which are administered by the Department of Finance.

In accordance with the PCMLTFA, the Financial Transactions and Reports Analysis Centre works to prevent and deter terrorist financing. Likewise, the Charities Directorate of the Canada Revenue Agency reviews applications, conducts audits, and collects and analyzes multi-source intelligence in order to detect and address risks to Canada's charitable sector. These operations are in accordance with the Income Tax Act, the Charities Registration (Security Information) Act, and the PCMLTFA.

The Finance Department also leads the Canadian effort in related international activities, particularly regarding the work of the Financial Action Task Force (FATF).

==== Border and transportation security ====
Measures taken in regards to cross-border movement of potential threats are facilitated under the Immigration and Refugee Protection Act (IRPA), primarily by the Canada Border Services Agency (CBSA) and Immigration, Refugees and Citizenship Canada (IRCC).

The CBSA, which is a part of Public Safety Canada, has an "Immigration Security Screening" program, which can "detect the movement of potential subjects of interest as they apply for temporary or permanent residence, or refugee status," as per IRPA. CBSA also monitors the cross-border flow of currency, and has the authority to seize "unreported currency flows suspected of being the proceeds of crime or related to terrorist financing."

Under IRPA, the Canadian government uses security certificates to detain and deport foreign nationals and all other non-citizens living in Canada. The certificate can be issued towards a permanent resident or any other non-citizen perceived to be a threat to national security, as well as those suspected of violating human rights or of having membership within organized crime.

The security of transportation systems are primarily facilitated by Transport Canada, which is the lead department for responding to transportation security incidents and for transportation-related emergency preparedness. This includes the security of aviation, marine, rail, road, and intermodal transportation security systems. Transport Canada's responsibilities are granted through several key federal statutes, such as the Aeronautics Act, the Marine Transportation Security Act, the Railway Safety Act, the International Bridges and Tunnels Act and the Transportation of Dangerous Goods Act.

Public Safety Canada and Transport Canada jointly oversee the Canadian no-fly list, called the Passenger Protect program, which identifies individuals who may pose a threat to aviation security and "reduces their ability to cause harm or threaten aviation by taking action, such as preventing them from boarding an aircraft." Additional security is provided through passenger and baggage screening, which is conducted by Transport Canada's Canadian Air Transport Security Authority (CATSA).

==== International and extraterritorial security ====
The Combating Terrorism Act, which came into force in July 2013, was put in place with the intent to prevent and deter individuals from leaving Canada for particular terrorism-related purposes.

The Department of Foreign Affairs and International Trade Act provides the Minister of Foreign Affairs with responsibility over all matters relating to the conduct of Canada's external affairs, including countering international terrorism and responding to terrorist incidents abroad. As such, the Foreign Affairs Minister leads Canada's response to terrorist or security-related incidents outside of the country. Global Affairs Canada is accordingly responsible for assessing social, economic, security, and political developments that "help define a global threat environment." Depending on the nature of the incident, the Canadian response can include the provision of consular assistance to Canadians overseas (including expatriates); financial or physical aid; or deployments of experts from Canada's national security community.

Extraterritorial investigations of terrorist activity are investigated by the RCMP (part of Public Safety Canada) when committed against a Canadian citizen or by a Canadian citizen abroad.

Various federal organizations, particularly the Canada Centre for Community Engagement and Prevention of Violence (Canada Centre; also part of Public Safety Canada), closely collaborate with partners in the Five Eyes (United States, United Kingdom, Australia, New Zealand), the Group of Seven (G7), and the European Union. The Canada Centre also actively participates in multilateral forums such as the United Nations and the Global Counterterrorism Forum (GCTF), as well as collaborating with the Institute for Strategic Dialogue, the Hedayah Center, and the Centre for Research and Evidence on Security Threats (CREST).

The Canadian government also engages in the Global Coalition against Daesh, a partnership of 79 countries that works towards defeating Daesh through such activities as preventing the flow of foreign terrorist fighters across borders and countering the group's communications.

==== Biosecurity ====
In terms of chemical, biological, radiological, and nuclear warfare, the surveillance for diseases and events resulting from the use of CBRNE agents is the responsibility of Public Health Agency of Canada, who is in charge of coordinating a public health response to such a terrorist incident. Monitoring services, hazard assessments, information, and advisories and decontamination strategies are also provided by Health Canada for CBRNE events. PHAC also maintains the National Emergency Stockpile System, which contains medical countermeasures against CBRNE agents and disaster medical supplies for use in mass-casualty incidents.

Moreover, all members of the Canadian Forces are trained in CBRNE defense. The Canadian Joint Incident Response Unit is a unit under the direction of the Canadian Special Operations Forces Command that is tasked with supporting the federal government in preventing, controlling, and mitigating CBRN threats to Canada, Canadians, and Canadian interests.

Health Canada is also mandated to provide services to support the overall security objectives for major international events (such as the 2010 Winter Olympics or G20 summit), specifically in the areas of health and safety of federal government employees, surveillance and response to radiological nuclear threats, and support to first-responders in the event of a CBRNE event or disease outbreak.

=== Designated organizations ===
The government of Canada has banned more than 52 terrorist organizations. These include Al Qaeda, the Armed Islamic Group, Euskadi Ta Askatasuna (ETA), Liberation Tigers of Tamil Eelam (LTTE), the International Sikh Youth Federation, the Palestinian Liberation Front, the Popular Front for the Liberation of Palestine, the Popular Front for the Liberation of Palestine-General Command, Hamas, Palestinian Islamic Jihad, Hezbollah, Kahane Chai, and the Taliban. In 2019, Combat 18 and Blood & Honour were the first neo-Nazi groups in Canada to be banned by the government.

In April 2006, the Canadian government designated the Liberation Tigers of Tamil Eelam as a terrorist group. In December that year, the government expanded the federal ban of Hezbollah from the purely militant wing to all 16 sub-organizations.

In 2026, Canadian Security Intelligence Service declared Khalistani extremists a national security threat, highlighting that the group uses institutions to promote its "violent extremist agenda" in the country. The agency, in its 2025 Public Report, had stated that the involvement of Canada-based Khalistani extremist (CBKE) in violent activities "continues to pose a national security threat to Canada and to Canadian interests."

== Research on extremism in Canada ==
The Kanishka Project was a CA$10 million, five-year initiative of Public Safety Canada that provided funding to research on terrorism-related matters affecting Canada.

Announced by the Government of Canada in June 2011, the Project was named after the Boeing 747-237B (Emperor Kanishka) plane that was bombed in the Air India Flight 182 attack of 1985. It funded nearly 70 projects and contributed to hosting various events related to discussing counter-terrorism. As part of the Project, $3.7 million was invested with Social Sciences and Humanities Research Council (SSHRC) towards supporting research and related activities that addressed the issues identified by the Kanishka Project.

The Canadian Network for Research on Terrorism, Security and Society (TSAS), located at the University of Waterloo, is an academic research network purposed to form "multidisciplinary research on terrorist radicalization" and "the coordinated interaction of academic researchers with government officials." It was created in 2012 with funding both the Kanishka Project and a grant from the SSHRC. TSAS' co-directors are Lorne Dawson and Veronica Kitchen.

== Radicalization in Canada ==
The Constitution of Canada, through the Charter of Rights and Freedoms, protects the freedom of thought, belief, opinion, and expression of Canadians. As a result, having radical ideals is not considered to be illegal in Canada.

In terms of radicalization to violence, various federal and provincial/territorial government initiatives have been established, particularly under Public Safety Canada on the federal level. Particularly, the Canada Centre for Community Engagement and Prevention of Violence (Canada Centre) leads the Canadian government's efforts to "counter radicalization to violence." It does not manage or advise on individual cases, but rather addresses the issue in terms of broad strategy. The Centre was mandated in 2015; the federal budget the following year allocated $35 million over five years to establish and support the Centre, in addition to $10 million per year on-going. The Canada Centre also leads the Canadian government's engagement and cooperation with the Global Internet Forum to Counter Terrorism (GIFCT), established by Google, Facebook, Twitter, and Microsoft in 2017.

On 11 December 2018, the Canada Centre launched the "National Strategy on Countering Radicalization to Violence," which is meant to "explain[] radicalization to violence and the destructive and harmful behaviours involved," as well as outlining the federal government's "approach and key priorities in countering and preventing radicalization to violence." Implementation of the National Strategy is supervised by the National Expert Committee on Countering Radicalization to Violence.

The Community Resilience Fund (CRF) is a system, administered by the Canada Centre, for supporting "partnerships in countering radicalization to violence in Canada," providing funding to organizations towards engagement (e.g., research, cooperation, engaging communities, etc.) with the issue. As of 2019‑2020 onward, the Fund has been promised $7 million available each year for existing and new projects. Through CRF, the Canada Centre has supported the Centre for the Prevention of Radicalization Leading to Violence, located in Montréal, in conducting research on "better understanding risk and protective factors within families of individuals who radicalize to violence and also the role families and communities can play in mitigating radicalization to violence." Also through the Fund, the Canada Centre has supported "multi-agency intervention programs to build capacity to manage cases of individuals who are radicalizing to violence."

=== Counter-radicalization programs ===
A number of government departments deliver "social programming that contribute" to supporting approaches "to preventing radicalization to violence". Such federal departments include:

- Royal Canadian Mounted Police — First Responders Terrorism Awareness Program
- Immigration, Refugees and Citizenship Canada — Settlement Program, and Resettlement Assistance Program
- Defence Research and Development Canada, Centre for Security Science — Canadian Safety and Security Program
- Global Affairs Canada — Anti-Crime Capacity Building Program, and the Counter-Terrorism Capacity Building Program
- Department of Justice Canada — Victims Fund
- Canadian Heritage — Community Support, Multiculturalism, and Anti-Racism Initiatives Program
- Status of Women Canada — Strategy to Prevent and Address Gender-Based Violence

Local government/non-profit initiatives funded by the Community Resilience Fund include:

- Furthering Our Communities by Uniting Services (FOCUS) Toronto — a program led by the Toronto Police Service, City of Toronto, and United Way Toronto and York Region, which is "building capacity to add radicalization to violence to the range of issues" that it addresses.
- Ottawa Multiagency Early Risk Intervention Tables (MERIT) — a collaborative intervention program supported by the Ottawa Police Service, local agencies, and service partners that is "building capacity to address cases of individuals radicalizing to violence," in addition to its existing capabilities.
- Edmonton Resiliency Project — a "collaborative approach" delivered by the Edmonton Police Service, City of Edmonton, and Organization for the Prevention of Violence "to prevention and intervention that draws on trusted community and organizational relationships to prevent violent extremism."
- Calgary Re-Direct — a partnership between the City of Calgary, Community and Neighbourhood Services, the Calgary Police Service, and others that "uses a multidisciplinary approach to intervention with youth and young adults who are vulnerable to radicalization to violence."
- Social Polarizations — a team of mental-health professionals who specialize in interventions to counter radicalization to violence, based in a local Integrated Health and Social Services Centre in Quebec.
- Centre for the Prevention of Radicalization Leading to Violence (CPRLV; often called the Montreal Centre)
- John Howard Society of Ottawa

== List of international threats and attacks ==
Date	Location	Details	Alleged motive	Type
April 17, 1840	Queenston, ON	Benjamin Lett, an Anglo-Irish-Canadian filibusterer, bombs the Brock's Monument, which honoured British general Sir Isaac Brock. The explosion did serious and irreparable damage to the monument although it failed to bring it down.	Opposition to British rule in Canada	Bombing
October 1864	Montreal, QC	Historians have discussed the potential for a conspiracy to have partially formed when agents of the Confederate Secret Service hosted a visit to Montreal by John Wilkes Booth, the future assassin of U.S. President Abraham Lincoln. After police shot Booth in 1865, they found a money order for $184,000 drawn from the Montreal Branch of the Ontario Bank.	Anti-Lincoln	Assassination conspiracy
April 7, 1868	Ottawa, ON	Thomas D'Arcy McGee, one of the Fathers of Confederation, is assassinated by an alleged Irish nationalist or Fenian rebel sympathizer named Patrick J. Whelan.	Irish nationalism	Assassination
November 25, 1965	Toronto, ON	Croatian nationalists bomb the Yugoslav consulate at 377 Spadina Road in Toronto. The blast "destroyed the door, door jamb, cement threshold, and foyer ceiling, and heavily damaged a vestibule and anteroom;" it blew out the door and windows, and collapsed part of the first floor ceiling. No people were killed.	Anti-Tito (Croatian nationalism)	Bombing
September 22, 1966	Ottawa, ON	A bazooka attack on the Cuban embassy in Ottawa is made.	Anti-Castro (Cuban nationalism)	Bazooka
October 5, 1966	Ottawa, ON	Anti-Castro forces bomb the offices of the Cuban trade delegation in Ottawa.	Anti-Castro	Bombing
January 29, 1967	Ottawa and Toronto, ON	The Yugoslav embassy in Ottawa and the consulate in Toronto are among 6 Yugoslav offices in North America attacked as part of a synchronized bombing, on the eve of the anniversary of the adoption of Yugoslavia’s constitution. (The other bombs went off in the embassy of Washington, D.C., and the consulates in Chicago, New York, and San Francisco.) The explosion destroyed windows in 15 houses, 35 apartments, and 6 nearby stores. No people were killed.	Anti-Tito	Bombing
May 31, 1967	Montreal, QC	A small bomb explodes at the Cuba Pavilion at Expo 67 in Montreal. The attack is attributed to Cuban Nationalist action.	Anti-Castro (Cuban nationalism)	Bombing
October 15, 1967	Montreal, QC	A bomb explodes at the offices of the native trade delegation in Montreal.	Anti-Castro (Cuban nationalism)	Bombing
May 29, 1969	Montreal, QC	A bomb is placed in the doorway of the Cuban consulate in Montreal but fails to go off.	Anti-Castro (Cuban nationalism)	Bombing attempt
July 12, 1971	Montreal, QC	A small bomb goes off at the offices of the native trade delegation in Montreal.	Anti-Castro	Bombing
April 4, 1972	Montreal, QC	Cuban official Sergio Pérez Castillo is killed by an explosion at the Cuban consulate in Montreal.	Anti-Castro	Bombing
January 21, 1974	Ottawa, ON	A bomb explodes at the Cuban embassy in Ottawa. It is attributed to Orlando Bosch, head of the Coordination of United Revolutionary Organizations (CORU).	Anti-Castro	Bombing
September 22, 1976	Montreal, QC	An explosive device is thrown from a car at the Cuban consulate in Montreal.	Anti-Castro	
January 14, 1980	Montreal, QC	A large explosion significantly damages the Cuban consulate in Montreal.		
April 8, 1982	Ottawa, ON	Turkish Commercial Counsellor to Canada, Kani Güngör, is paralyzed after an attack by Armenian nationalists at his apartment in Ottawa.	Armenian nationalism	Assassination attempt
August 23, 1982	Ottawa, ON	Turkish military attaché to Canada Col. Atilla Altıkat, is assassinated by Armenian militants in Ottawa while sitting in his vehicle at a traffic light.	Armenian nationalism	Assassination
September 3, 1984	Montreal, QC	1984 Montreal bombing: Montreal Central Station is bombed, killing 3 French tourists and wounding more than 30. Thomas Bernard Brigham, an elderly retired American armed forces officer, claims to have been protesting Pope John Paul II's visit to Canada.	Anti-popery	Bombing
March 12, 1985	Ottawa, ON	1985 Turkish embassy attack in Ottawa: a group belonging to the Armenian Revolutionary Army seize the Embassy of the Republic of Turkey in Ottawa, killing a Canadian security guard.	Armenian nationalism	Shooting
June 23, 1985	Montreal, QC (origin) and Tokyo, Japan	Two attacks carried out by Sikh extremists living in British Columbia: Air India Flight 182 bombing: a commercial aircraft leaving Montreal's Mirabel International Airport is blown up mid-flight to London, England. This is considered the world's deadliest terrorist attack prior to September 11, 2001. Narita International Airport bombing: an explosion at Tokyo's Narita International Airport kills two baggage handlers, and injures four. The bomb was intended for Air India Flight 301, with 177 passengers and crew on board, bound for Bangkok International Airport.	Khalistani	Bombing
May 26, 1986	Vancouver, BC	An attempt is made to assassinate Malkiat Singh Sidhu, a cabinet minister in the Indian province of Punjab visiting Vancouver. Sidhu is shot and wounded, but survives.	Khalistani	Assassination attempt
August 28, 1988	Surrey, BC	Indo-Canadian Times editor Tara Singh Hayer is shot and partially paralyzed, probably due to his statements connected to the Flight 182 investigation.	Khalistani	Assassination attempt
April 9, 1989	Ottawa, ON	Charles Yacoub, a Lebanese Canadian, hijacks a New York-bound Greyhound bus and drives it to Parliament Hill to protest the Syrian invasion of Lebanon. There were no casualties.	Pro-Lebanon	Vehicular hijacking
November 18, 1998	Surrey, BC	Indo-Canadian Times editor Tara Singh Hayer is shot to death.	Khalistani	Assassination
2004	United Kingdom	Police arrest Ottawa-native Momin Khawaja, who worked with British Islamists on a plot to detonate bombs in the United Kingdom. Khawaja was convicted in 2008 under Canada's Anti-Terrorism Act.	Islamic extremism	Bombing conspiracy
July 10, 2025	Surrey, BC	Ten gunshots were fired shortly before 2:00 a.m. at the newly opened Kap's Cafe restaurant owned by Indian stand-up comedian, actor, television host, dubbing arist, producer and singer Kapil Sharma while staff were still inside. No casualties were reported. Harjit Singh Laddi, allegedly linked to Babbar Khalsa, claimed responsibility, citing anger over Sharma's alleged remarks as the motive.	Khalistani	Shooting

== List of domestic threats and attacks ==
Date	Location	Details	Alleged motive	Type
1920s		Arson and bombing by Freedomites (svobodniki, Russian: "sovereign people") of Community Doukhobor buildings and schools to protest materialism, and government pressure to school svobodnik children	Anti-materialism	Bombings and arson
October 29, 1924	British Columbia	Peter Verigin (65) is killed in a still-unsolved train explosion between Castlegar and Grand Forks. Eight others killed included member of the provincial legislature John McKie.	Anti-materialism	Bombing
1960s	British Columbia	Arson and bombings by SOF (Sons of Freedom), mostly conducted in the nude, took place throughout the 1960s: August 25, 1960 — A section of a Canadian Pacific Railway track near Thrums, BC, is bombed. Pieces of the timing device (including a watch) were found at the scene by police. Three members of SOF (Sons of Freedom) were convicted for the incident and received jail terms ranging from 6 to 12 years.; 1961 — a railway bridge in Nelson, BC is bombed.	Anti-materialism	Bombing and arson
1963-1970	Montreal, QC, and Ottawa, ON	Front de libération du Québec (FLQ), a separatist group, begins a bombing campaign at the average rate of one every ten days, detonating over 950 bombs in total and culminating in the 1970 October Crisis. Targets included English owned businesses, banks, McGill University, and the homes of prominent English speakers.: April 21, 1963 — FLQ bombing of the Canadian Army Recruiting Centre in Montreal, killing Sgt. Wilfred V. O'Neil.; late 1960s — FLQ places a bomb in a mailbox next to the Canadian Tire store on Wellington Street in Ottawa.; February 13, 1969– Montreal Stock Exchange bombing: FLQ sets off a powerful bomb that rips through the Montreal Stock Exchange causing massive destruction and seriously injuring 27 people.; February 22, 1969 — FLQ terrorist bomb explodes at Liberal Party social club in Montreal, injuring two people.; June 24, 1970 — FLQ places a bomb in a window well of the National Defence Headquarters on Lisgar Street in Ottawa. The explosion killed a cleaning lady.	Quebec nationalism	Bombing campaign
January 29, 1965	Edmonton, AB	Edmonton aircraft bombing: Two U.S. jets (F-84s) being overhauled by Northwest Industries in Edmonton are destroyed and a third damaged when a left-wing group protesting the Vietnam War dynamites the planes; a security guard is killed during the incident.	Anti-Vietnam War	Bombing
July 8, 1965	Vancouver, BC (origin)	Canadian Pacific Air Lines Flight 21 bombing: A bomb destroys a commercial Douglas DC-6B airliner flying from Vancouver to Whitehorse, killing all 52 people on board. The case remains unsolved.	Unknown	Bombing
May 18, 1966	Ottawa, ON	Paul Joseph Chartier's attempt to bomb the House of Commons fails when the device goes off prematurely in a Centre Block washroom, killing Chartier.	anti-Canadian government	Bombing
October 5, 1970	Montreal, QC	British diplomat James Cross and (on October 10) Quebec Minister of Labour Pierre Laporte are kidnapped by the FLQ in Montreal. (Laporte's dead body was discovered in the trunk of a car in Montreal on October 17, and the murderers were arrested on December 26; Cross was released on December 3.)	Quebec nationalism	Kidnapping & assassination
October 14, 1982	Ontario	The anarchist group Squamish Five bombs a Litton Industries factory north of Toronto, that is manufacturing guidance devices for American cruise missiles, injuring ten.	Anarchism	Bombing
1983	Toronto, ON	Activist Henry Morgentaler was attacked by a man wielding garden shears; the attack was blocked by feminist activist Judy Rebick, who was standing nearby.	Anti-abortion	Stabbing attempt
May 8, 1984	Quebec City, QC	Soldier Denis Lortie, a federalist, entered the National Assembly of Quebec with the intent of killing René Lévesque and the deputies of the Parti Québécois. By chance, he came in too early, so fails to kill any deputies; though, he kills 3 other people and wounds 13. Unarmed employee René Jalbert negotiated with Lortie for several hours and convinced him to give up his gun and be arrested. Jalbert was decorated the next week.	Anti-Quebec nationalism	Mass shooting and assassination attempt
June 23, 1985	Montreal, QC (origin) and Tokyo, Japan	Two attacks carried out by Sikh extremists living in British Columbia: Air India Flight 182 bombing: a commercial aircraft leaving Montreal's Mirabel International Airport is blown up mid-flight to London, England, killing all 329 people aboard, including 268 Canadian citizens, 27 British citizens, and 24 Indian citizens. This is considered the world's deadliest terrorist attack prior to September 11, 2001. Narita International Airport bombing: an explosion at Tokyo's Narita International Airport kills two baggage handlers, and injures four. The bomb was intended for Air India Flight 301, with 177 passengers and crew on board, bound for Bangkok International Airport.	Khalistani	Bombing
December 6, 1989	Montreal, QC	École Polytechnique massacre (or Montreal massacre): 25-year-old Marc Lépine, armed with a rifle and a hunting knife, shoots 28 people, killing 14 women, before committing suicide at the Polytechnique Montréal. He claimed he was "fighting feminism" and calling the women "a bunch of feminists," he shot all 9 women in the room, killing 6. He then moved through corridors, the cafeteria, and another classroom, specifically targeting women to shoot.	Misogynist terrorism / antifeminism	Mass shooting
May 18, 1992	Toronto, ON	Activist Henry Morgentaler's clinic is firebombed and sustained severe damage. The event occurred at night, so no one was injured, although a nearby bookstore was damaged. Appointments were switched to another clinic in Toronto and no abortions were prevented.	Anti-abortion	Bombing
November 8, 1994	Vancouver, BC	Dr. Garson Romalis is shot in the leg.	Anti-abortion	Shooting
April 20, 1995	Charlottetown, PEI	Roger Charles Bell (alias Loki 7), a high-school teacher, places a bomb outside Province House at the Prince Edward Island legislature, injuring one. The explosion occurred several minutes after a class of school children passed through the area, and one day after the Oklahoma City bombing attack in the United States. The 1995 attack was part of a string of bombings by Bell, which began in 1988 with a pipe bomb denoting in a flower bed outside the Provincial Court in Charlottetown; followed by a garbage can explosion in Halifax's Point Pleasant Park in 1994; ending in 1996 with undetonated explosives that were planted at a Charlottetown propane station.	"revenge at society"	Bombing
November 10, 1995	Ancaster, ON	Dr. Hugh Short is shot in the elbow.	Anti-abortion	Shooting
November 11, 1997	Winnipeg, MB	Dr. Jack Fainman is shot in the shoulder.	Anti-abortion	Shooting
December 14, 1999	Victoria, BC	LAX bombing plot: Ahmed Ressam (alias Millennium Bomber) is arrested upon entering the United States by a ferry from Victoria. He was smuggling explosives in his car from Canada in a plot to bomb the Los Angeles International Airport (LAX) on New Year's Eve 1999, as part of the foiled 2000 millennium attack plots.	Islamic extremism	Bombing attempt
July 11, 2000	Vancouver, BC	Dr. Garson Romalis is stabbed by an unidentified assailant in the lobby of his clinic.	Anti-abortion	Stabbing
September 20, 2000	Montreal, QC	The Brigade d'autodéfense du français bombs the St. Nicholas Antiochian Orthodox Church in Montreal where an English fundraiser was to be held.	Quebec nationalism	Bombing
2001	Montreal, QC	Second Cup firebombing: The FLQ/Brigade d'autodéfense du français firebombs three Second Cup locations in Montreal. They were targeted because of the company's use of its incorporated English name "Second Cup". Rhéal Mathieu, a previously convicted FLQ terrorist, was convicted for all three bombings. Seven McDonald's restaurants were also firebombed.	Quebec nationalism	Bombing
2006	Ottawa, ON	2006 Ontario terrorism plot: Canadian counter-terrorism forces arrest 18 terrorists (dubbed the "Toronto 18") inspired by al-Qaeda. They are accused of planning to detonate truck bombs; to open fire in a crowded area; and to storm the Canadian Broadcasting Centre, the Canadian Parliament building, the Canadian Security Intelligence Service (CSIS) headquarters, and the parliamentary Peace Tower, to take hostages and to behead the Prime Minister and other leaders.	Islamic extremism	Bombing / shooting / assassination conspiracy
October 2008 to July 2009	Dawson Creek, BC	2008–09 British Columbia pipeline bombings: six natural gas pipelines owned by EnCana Corp. in Dawson Creek, were bombed after letters were sent to a local newspaper opposing the gas industry.	Environmentalism	Bombing
August 2010	Ottawa, ON	Misbahuddin Ahmed, a former hospital technician, is arrested (later convicted in July 2014) of conspiring to knowingly facilitate a terrorist activity, of participation in the activities of a terrorist group, and of possession of explosives with intent to do harm.	Islamic extremism	Conspiracy
September 4, 2012	Montreal, QC	2012 Montreal shooting: The night of the Quebec provincial elections, Richard Bain, an anglophone Quebecer, attempted to assassinate Parti Québécois leader and Premier elect Pauline Marois at a victory gathering in Montreal. He also set fire to the Métropolis concert hall where the event was being held. A man was killed and another was injured in the terrorist act. It is said that Bain's ultimate goal was to kill Marois following the Parti Québécois victory. Bain was arrested shortly after the attack. On August 23, 2016, Bain was found guilty of second-degree murder, and on November 18, was sentenced to life imprisonment with the possibility of parole after 20 years.	Anti-Quebec nationalism	Shooting
2013	Toronto, ON	2013 Via Rail Canada terrorism plot: Chiheb Esseghaier and Raed Jaser of Montreal and Toronto, respectively, are charged as part of an alleged Al-Qaeda plot to derail a Toronto-bound train from New York on the Canadian side of the border. Canadian Muslims helped to foil the alleged plot. The suspects said they were arrested based on their appearance.	Islamic extremism (allegiance to Al-Qaeda)	Bombing conspiracy
June 4, 2014	Moncton, NB	Moncton shootings: Justin Bourque, a 24-year-old, shot five officers from the Royal Canadian Mounted Police (RCMP), killing three and severely injuring two. Bourque admittedly planned to kill as many officers as he could, in an attempt to start a rebellion against what he considers an oppressive, corrupt government that he insists is suppressing the freedom of most Canadians and serving only the rich.	Anti-Canadian government (pro-rebellion)	Shooting
October 20, 2014	Saint-Jean-sur-Richelieu, QC	2014 Saint-Jean-sur-Richelieu ramming attack: two Canadian Forces members are hit by Martin Couture-Rouleau, a recent Muslim convert. Warrant officer Patrice Vincent died of his injuries. Couture-Rouleau was eventually gunned down and killed.	Islamic extremism	Vehicle-ramming
October 22, 2014	Ottawa, ON	2014 shootings at Parliament Hill: Michael Zehaf-Bibeau, a convert to Islam, fatally shoots Corporal Nathan Cirillo, a Canadian soldier on ceremonial sentry duty at the National War Memorial, and then forced his way into Canada's parliament building, where he has a shootout with parliament security personnel. He is shot 31 times and dies at the scene. Zehaf-Bibeau made a video prior to the attack in which he expressed his motives as being related "to Canada's foreign policy and in respect of his religious beliefs."	Islamic extremism and anti-Canadian foreign policy	Shooting
August 10, 2016	Strathroy, ON	Aaron Driver is killed in a confrontation with police after detonating an explosive in the back seat of a taxi. The confrontation followed a tip from the FBI that Driver had made a "martyrdom video" and was planning an attack on an urban area.	Islamic extremism (allegiance to ISIS)	Bombing (failed)
January 29, 2017	Quebec City, QC	Quebec City mosque shooting: During evening prayer at the Islamic Cultural Centre mosque in Quebec City, one gunman enters and opens fire on Muslim worshipers, killing 6 people and injuring 19 (5 critically). The gunman called police from a second location about 20 minutes after the shooting and was arrested by Quebec police without incident. The gunman, Alexandre Bissonnette from Quebec City, was inspired by extreme right-wing views on Muslims, refugees, and feminists, which he shared online and at Laval University. He was also a supporter of Rassemblement National leader Marine Le Pen of France and U.S. President Donald Trump.	Islamophobia	Shooting
September 30, 2017	Edmonton, AB	2017 Edmonton attack: 30-year-old Abdulahi Sharif drives into Edmonton police constable Mike Chernyk, then stabs him near Commonwealth Stadium, fleeing and later hitting four pedestrians with a rental truck during a police pursuit. Police have investigated the incident as an act of terrorism and confirmed the presence of an ISIS flag in the van that struck the police officer. Sharif was confirmed by RCMP assistant commissioner Marlin Degrand as a Somali national known to the RCMP and Edmonton Police as having past displayed signs of extremism.	Islamic extremism (allegiance to ISIS)	Vehicle-ramming and stabbing
April 23, 2018	Toronto, ON	Toronto van attack: After 25-year-old Alek Minassian's van attack in Toronto, a Facebook post was uncovered which tied him to predominantly male online communities wherein terminology such as "Incel Rebellion", "Beta Uprising," and "Beta Male Uprising" is used, referring to a violent response to sexlessness. Minassian was reported to have self-identified as an incel, an abbreviation of involuntary celibacy, which describes the state of being unable to find a romantic or sexual relationship despite desiring one.	Misogynist terrorism / incel extremism	Vehicle-ramming
July 22, 2018	Toronto, ON	2018 Toronto shooting: Faisal Hussain killed 2 and injured 13 on Toronto's Danforth Avenue. Authorities were unable to determine a motive despite a year long investigation. Hussain was alleged to have been inspired by Elliot Rodger (part of the incel movement). Daesh claimed responsibility but law enforcement rejected this claim.	Unknown	Shooting
February 21, 2020	Toronto, ON	Saad Akhtar kills a 64-year-old woman with a hammer in Toronto. The victim was chosen at random. Akhtar left a note on the victim's body, expressing support for ISIS. He was arrested and charged with terrorism offences.	Islamic extremism (allegiance to ISIS)	Hammer attack
February 24, 2020	Toronto, ON	2020 Toronto machete attack: A 17-year-old boy stabs a female spa worker to death, attempts to kill her coworker, and injures another at a sensual massage parlour in Toronto. On May 19, the Toronto Police Service said the attack was attributed to the incel ideology and was being considered an act of terrorism.	Misogynist terrorism / incel extremism	Stabbing
June 6, 2021	London, ON	London, Ontario truck attack: A man uses a pickup truck to run down a family of five, killing four and seriously injuring the fifth. The family was targeted because they were visibly Muslim.	Islamophobia	Vehicle-ramming
June 28, 2022	Saanich, BC	2022 Saanich shootout: Two brothers robbed a bank with the intention to start shooting and kill police officers in a final stand opposed to government regulations, particularly firearms ownership. The ensuing shootout resulted in 6 injured officers and both perpetrators killed.	Anti-police sentiment, Anti-government sentiment	Shooting, Shootout
April 1, 2023	Surrey, BC	A man was stabbed and wounded in the throat on a bus in Surrey by an Islamic State sympathizer.	Islamic extremism	Stabbing attack
April 26, 2025	Vancouver, BC	2025 Vancouver car attack: A Vancouver resident named Kai-Ji Adam Lo drives his car straight into a crowd at the Lapu-Lapu Day street festival and kills 11 attendees.	Under investigation	Vehicle-ramming
July 9, 2025	Quebec City, QC	Two Canadian Armed Forces members and two others with military ties were arrested and charged for allegedly attempting to forcibly take possession of land and start an anti-government community north of Quebec City. Three of them were charged with facilitating terrorist activity, including a man that allegedly expressed a desire for a Waco siege-style massacre.	Anti-government	Attempted massacre, stealing land
November 4, 2025	Greater Toronto Area, Toronto, ON	A youth was charged with participating in the activities of a terrorist group by the editing and public posting of ISIS propaganda videos and inviting a person to provide property, i.e., firearms, intending that they be used, in whole or in part, for the purpose of facilitating or carrying out a terrorist activity. The accused cannot be identified under the provisions of the Youth Criminal Justice Act. Very little about the investigation was shared publicly.	Islamic extremism	Attempted attack
September 20, 2026	Belleville, ON	2026 Belleville synagogue shooting: 29-year-old Sean Ward tried to attack a synagogue and ambushed a police officer guarding the building, resulting in a shootout soon joined by a second officer. The shooting left the guarding cop seriously wounded and Ward with life-threatening injuries to which he would succumb the day after. During the attack, he was heard shouting "You are going to die for the Jews" and authorities called it "hate motivated"	Antisemitism	Shooting, Attempted massacre

=== Suspected terrorism ===
- March 5, 2015 — While new anti-terrorism law was under consideration and months before federal election, four Conservative Party Members of Parliament (Denis Lebel, Steven Blaney, Christian Paradis and Maxime Bernier) in Quebec received letters with white powder (Anthrax hoaxes) and message "Conservateurs, vous serez anéantis," which translates to "Conservatives, you will be annihilated" at their constituency offices.
- On March 10, 2026 - a shooting occurred at the U.S. Consulate in Toronto, with two suspect firing at the building before fleeing in white Honda CR-V. The incident caused damage but no injuries, since the consulate is heavily fortified. Authorities are investigating the shooting as a national security incident, with connection to ongoing geopolitical tension under consideration. Canadian and U.S. officials are collaborating on the investigation, with increased security around diplomatic mission in response. On 12 June the same year, a police officer was shot and killed during a raid on suspects connected to the shooting. The perpetrator was also hit in the gunfight and suffered life-threatening wounds.

== Terrorism abroad ==
Canadian victims of non-Canada-related extremism abroad include:

- September 11, 2001– 9/11 attacks (USA): United Airlines Flight 175 and American Airlines Flight 11 were purposefully crashed into the World Trade Center in New York City, killing 2,977 people, including Garnet Bailey (53), a Canadian professional ice hockey player and scout who was a member of Stanley Cup and Memorial Cup winning teams.
- August 19, 2003– Canal Hotel bombing (Iraq): A suicide truck bombing in Baghdad supposedly carried out by Jama'at al-Tawhid wal-Jihad killed 22 people, including two Canadians—Christopher Klein-Beekman (31), a UNICEF representative, and Gillian Clark (47), an aid worker for the Christian Children's Fund (CCF).
- January 15, 2006– Killing of Glyn Berry (Afghanistan): A car bomb attack in Afghanistan killed Glyn Berry, the first Canadian diplomat to be killed while on duty in Afghanistan. Two other civilians were killed in the incident and 10 people were wounded, including three Canadian soldiers, MCpl. Paul Franklin, Pte. William Edward Salikin and Cpl. Jeffrey Bailey.
- September 2013– Westgate shopping mall attack (Nairobi, Kenya): An attack carried out by Al-Shabaab killed 68 people, including two Canadians—a businessman and a Government of Canada official.
- June 13, 2016– Killing of Robert Hall (Philippines): On 21 September 2015, Canadian citizen Robert Hall (66) was kidnapped by Abu Sayyaf militants in the Philippines and beheaded nine months later near Patikul, Sulu.

=== Extremists with Canadian connections abroad ===
The Combating Terrorism Act, which came into force in July 2013, was put in place with the intent to prevent and deter individuals from leaving Canada for particular terrorism-related purposes. In 2018, the Canadian government states that there has not been an increase, nor does it expect an increase, in the number of Canadian Extremist Travellers (CETs) who have returned to Canada. The total number of CETs identified by the government includes around 190 individuals who have a nexus to Canada, and near 60 who have returned.

The following are some extremists around the world with Canadian connections.

- Xristos Katsiroubas and Ali Medlej (Algeria) — two high school friends from London, Ontario who went to Morocco in 2011, and then onwards to Mauritania, Niger, and Libya, where they are said to have trained under Algerian terrorist Mokhtar Belmokhtar. Both were killed after taking part in a terrorist attack in the In Amenas hostage crisis in January 2013, which killed 38 hostages at an Algerian gas plant.
- Andre Poulin (Syria) — a man from Timmins, Ontario who subscribed to violent extremist views in 2008. Arriving in Syria in 2012, he is considered to have been killed fighting at the al-Minakh airfield in August 2013.
- Ali Mohamed Dirie (Syria) — a former member of the "Toronto 18" previously imprisoned for plotting terrorist attacks in Ontario. Within a year of his release, Dirie travelled to Syria and joined a terrorist group.
- Damian Clairmont or Mustafa al-Gharib (Syria) — a man from Calgary, Alberta who subscribed to violent extremist views. He is presumed to have been killed in infighting between terrorist groups in Syria.
- Mahad Ali Dhore (Somalia) — a man who crossed into Somalia while visiting Kenya to join an al-Shabaab training camp. He is considered to have been killed while helping conduct an April 2013 terrorist attack in Mogadishu.

== See also ==
- Integrated Terrorism Assessment Centre
- National Terrorism Threat Level
- Charkaoui v Canada (Minister of Citizenship and Immigration)
- 2026 Quebec Islamic threat
- Anti-Canadian sentiment
- Anti-abortion violence in Canada
- Crime in Canada
- Law enforcement in Canada
- List of unsolved murders
- Terrorism in the United States
- List of attacks on legislatures
- Islamic terrorism in Europe
- List of terrorist incidents
- Terrorism in the United States
- Left-wing terrorism
- Right-wing terrorism
