= 2013 Via Rail Canada terrorism plot =

Conspiracy to commit terrorist acts in and against Canada

- Courtroom sketch of Raed Jaser being arraigned on special terrorism-related charges
- Location: Jordan, Ontario, Canada (aboard the Maple Leaf train)
- Date: Charges: 1 April 2012 – 31 December 2012; RCMP arrests: 22 April 2013
- Target: Maple Leaf train
- Attack type: Conspiracy
- Injuries: 0
- Perpetrators: 2 suspects

The 2013 Via Rail Canada terrorism plot was a conspiracy to commit terrorist acts in and against Canada in the form of disruption, destruction or derailment of trains operated by Canada's national passenger railway service, Via Rail Canada. The alleged targeted train route was the Maple Leaf, the daily train service between Toronto and New York City operated jointly by Via Rail and Amtrak. A railway bridge over the Twenty Mile Creek in Jordan, Ontario, was later identified as the target, according to unsealed court documents.

Suspects Chiheb Esseghaier, a Tunisian national, and Raed Jaser, a Palestinian, were arrested on 22 April 2013 by the RCMP and subsequently charged by the Crown in connection with the plot. Both men were permanent residents of Canada at the time of their arrests, although the Canadian government had sought the deportation of Jaser for a second time after the conviction. The deportation attempt was withdrawn after the Ontario Court of Appeal allowed a new trial in August 2019.

On 20 March 2015, an Ontario Superior Court of Justice jury found both defendants guilty on all but one count of the charges. The jury was discharged from determining the extent of guilt on the remaining charge. On 23 September 2015, both Esseghaier and Jaser were sentenced to life imprisonment for a combination of six terrorism-related offences. In August 2019, the Ontario Court of Appeal ordered a new trial for both men due to juror selection issues in Jaser's case, although the Supreme Court of Canada overturned the verdict on 7 October 2020 and, despite affirming the issues regarding juror selection, refused a new trial because their rights to a fair trial had not been harmed. The case was then sent back to the appellate court. Mr. Esseghaier subsequently withdrew his appeal on the remaining issues raised, while Mr. Jaser's appeal was dismissed on all remaining issues. On August 7, 2025, the Supreme Court of Canada indicated it would not hear a further attempt to appeal by Mr. Jaser, bringing an end to the legal proceedings surrounding the plot.

== Investigation ==
The arrests were the culmination of an investigation by the Royal Canadian Mounted Police (RCMP). The RCMP received cooperation and assistance from the Canadian Security Intelligence Service and the Canada Border Services Agency. Provincial police forces involved were the Ontario Provincial Police and the Sûreté du Québec. Municipal police forces involved were the Service de police de la Ville de Montréal, the Toronto Police Service, York Regional Police, Peel Regional Police, and the Durham Regional Police. Railway police forces involved were from Via Rail Canada and CN Rail.

In its interdiction, dubbed "Operation SMOOTH" by the RCMP, Canada received cooperation and assistance from the United States Department of Homeland Security, including the United States Transportation Security Administration, and the United States Federal Bureau of Investigation.

A law firm that has been at the forefront in challenging Canadian anti-terror legislation, KSM Law, appears to have been instrumental in having one of their clients tip off authorities. Lawyers Naseer Irfan Syed and Faisal Kutty are co-founders of this law firm. In an op-ed published in the Toronto Star, Kutty cited this as evidence that the Muslim community, while critical of rights abuses, is concerned about Canada's security as well.

== Suspects ==
Chiheb Esseghaier, a Tunisian citizen, was arrested by RCMP in Montreal, and Raed Jaser, who is stateless of Palestinian descent, was arrested in Toronto. The Crown filed special terrorism-related charges against both, with the consent on behalf of the Attorney General of Canada, as required by section 83.24 of the Criminal Code. The charges included conspiracy to carry out an attack, and to commit murder at the direction of, or in association with, a terrorist group.

=== Chiheb Esseghaier ===
Canadian and American intelligence experts have linked the plot to involvement by Al-Qaeda elements (possibly Jundallah) based around the Iran–Pakistan barrier. Chiheb Esseghaier is known to have travelled to Iran. At his arraignment before Justice of the Peace Susan Hilton in Toronto, Esseghaier repudiated the Criminal Code under which he was charged. Esseghaier defiantly told the court, "it is not a holy book." If convicted, he would receive a sentence of life imprisonment. Esseghaier, who was a doctoral student at the Institut national de la recherche scientifique of the Université du Québec, was known for his disruptive and offensive behaviour, and was referred to by his neighbours as a "nightmare neighbour". Esseghaier is believed to have been "radicalized" through contact with Ahmed Abassi, a 26-year-old Tunisian also arrested in connection with the plot by the U.S. Federal Bureau of Investigation in New York on 22 April.

=== Raed Jaser ===
Born in the United Arab Emirates to Palestinian parents, Jaser arrived in Canada in September 1993 from Germany, with his parents and two siblings. The family travelled on forged French passports and applied for asylum after arrival, with Jaser included as a dependent minor. Their application was denied in 1997, although his remaining family members successfully applied for deferral of their removal orders and have become Canadian citizens by 2004. Jaser was denied the deferral in 1998 due to his existing criminal record. By the time of his 2004 arrest and removal attempt, Jaser already had five convictions relating to fraud and a conviction of uttering death threats.

For the first time, the Canadian government sought for his removal after his 2004 arrest. During the hearing adjudicated by the Immigration and Refugee Board of Canada, Jaser claimed that he was Palestinian and a stateless person, not a citizen of the UAE as claimed by the Canadian government. Other claims pertinent to his hearing included that he had been harassed by anti-immigrant groups while living in Germany, where the family also applied for asylum before arriving in Canada. The IRB refused the government's request to keep him in immigration detention on the ground that his risk of not showing up for trials was low and his uncle had posted his bail. The Canadian government ultimately failed to deport him in that attempt and, in 2012, approved his application to remain in the country as a permanent resident. Despite claiming to be stateless, Jaser had travelled to the UAE on a Jordanian passport on numerous occasions until 2011. In 2009, Jaser was pardoned for his convictions between 1997 and 2001, although the Parole Board of Canada withdrew the pardon in 2014 when he was under trial for terrorism. A year before his arrest, Jaser had been employed driving a minivan transporting special-education students in Markham, Ontario, and between 2008 and 2011, he was the director of a transportation company. The contracting company that hired Jaser for transporting students claimed that Jaser had passed a background check, a criminal record check as well as a vulnerable sector check, which is required for persons working with minors.

Jaser has shown growing signs of radicalization as early as 2010 and 2011, when his father contacted activist Muhammad Robert Heft several times out of concern for Jaser's "overzealous and intolerant" behaviour.

== Case ==
Chiheb Esseghaier and Raed Jaser were charged on 23 April 2013 by the Crown under special consent of the Attorney General of Canada, pursuant to section 83.24 of the Criminal Code. George Dolhai, Deputy Director of Public Prosecutions, entered charges under the Criminal Code against the two suspects.

=== Charges ===
The Crown alleged, both in English and French, as follows:

CONSENT OF THE ATTORNEY GENERAL OF CANADA

Pursuant to section 83.24 of the Criminal Code I, the undersigned, George Dolhai, Deputy Director of Public Prosecutions, on behalf of the Director of Public Prosecutions and Deputy Attorney General of Canada do consent to the commencement of proceedings against Chiheb Esseghaier and Raed Jaser in respect of the following offences:

1. Chiheb Esseghaier and Raed Jaser, between April 1st, 2012 and September 25th, 2012, in the City of Toronto, in the Province of Ontario, and in the City of Montreal, in the Province of Quebec, and elsewhere, did conspire, the one with the other, to interfere with transportation facilities contrary to section 248 of the Criminal Code of Canada, for the benefit of, at the direction of, or in association with a terrorist group, thereby committing an offence contrary to section 83.2 of the Criminal Code of Canada.

2. Chiheb Esseghaier and Raed Jaser, between April 1st, 2012 and September 25th, 2012, in the City of Toronto, in the Province of Ontario and in the City of Montreal, in the Province of Quebec and elsewhere, did conspire, the one with the other, to murder persons unknown contrary to section 235(1) of the Criminal Code of Canada, for the benefit of, at the direction of, or in association with a terrorist group, thereby committing an offence contrary to section 83.2 of the Criminal Code of Canada.

3. Chiheb Esseghaier between April 1st, 2012 and September 25th 2012, in the City of Toronto, in the Province of Ontario and in the City of Montreal, in the Province of Quebec and elsewhere, did knowingly participate in or contribute to, directly or indirectly, any activity of a terrorist group for the purpose of enhancing the ability of any terrorist group to facilitate or carry out a terrorist activity, thereby committing an offence contrary to section 83.18 of the Criminal Code of Canada.

4. Chiheb Esseghaier, between September 25th, 2012 and February 14th, 2013, in the City of Toronto, in the Province of Ontario and in the City of Montreal, in the Province of Quebec and elsewhere, did knowingly participate in or contribute to, directly or indirectly, any activity of a terrorist group for the purpose of enhancing the ability of any terrorist group to facilitate or carry out a terrorist activity, thereby committing an offence contrary to section 83.18 of the Criminal Code of Canada.

5. Raed Jaser, between April 1st 2012 and September 25th, 2012, in the City of Toronto, in the Province of Ontario and in the City of Montreal, in the Province of Quebec and elsewhere, did knowingly participate in or contribute to, directly or indirectly, any activity of a terrorist group for the purpose of enhancing the ability of any terrorist group to facilitate or carry out a terrorist activity, thereby committing an offence contrary to section 83.18 of the Criminal Code of Canada.

6. Chiheb Esseghaier, between September 7th, 2012 and December 20th, 2012, in the City of Toronto, in the Province of Ontario and in the City of Montreal, in the Province of Quebec and elsewhere, did knowingly instruct, directly or indirectly, any person to carry out any activity for the benefit of, at the direction of or in association with a terrorist group, for the purpose of enhancing the ability of any terrorist group to facilitate or carry out a terrorist activity, contrary to section 83.21 of the Criminal Code of Canada.

=== Links to foreign groups ===
Though the group linked to the plot is believed to operate out of Iran, it is not believed that they have received any Iranian state support, as historically Iran's regime has been officially hostile towards Al-Qaeda. While U.S. officials have claimed that Iran has given permission for Al-Qaeda to operate in Iran, the Iranian government has steadfastly denied any involvement, or even that Al-Qaeda has any operations on Iranian soil. A statement released by Iran's mission to the United Nations stated "Iran's position against this group is very clear and well known [ . . . ] Al Qaeda has no possibility to do any activity inside Iran or conduct any operation abroad from Iran's territory, and we reject strongly and categorically any connection to this story." In responding to the alleged connections to Iran, Peter T. King, a member of the United States House of Representatives and chairman of the House Homeland Security Subcommittee on Counterintelligence and Terrorism stated "We know very little about al Qaeda's relationship with Iran." However, Canadian official James Malizia stated the perpetrators had received "direction and guidance" from "Al Qaeda elements" within Iran.

=== Nature of plot ===
Representatives of Via Rail have assured the public that at no time were passengers in danger, as the plot was foiled before the men could put it into action. Canadian officials would not release certain details about the plot, but did explain that it had still been in the planning stages and was thwarted before it could be enacted. It was reported that the two men were under surveillance for over a year, and the RCMP alleged that the men "took steps and conducted activities to conduct a terrorist attack," such as monitoring trains in the Greater Toronto Area.

=== Sentencing ===
On 23 September 2015, both men were sentenced to life imprisonment by the Ontario Superior Court. The judge noted that neither had accepted responsibility for their offences or renounced their violent, racist, extremist beliefs, and expressed doubt on their rehabilitation prospects. In August 2019, the Ontario Court of Appeal ordered a new trial for Jaser on grounds the jury that convicted him was improperly chosen because the preferred method of juror selection was not available to him, and extended the decision to Esseghaier, although the verdict was overturned by the Supreme Court of Canada in October 2020, which agreed with the Crown that the matter was technical and did not affect their rights to a fair trial. The Supreme Court then remitted the case to the Ontario Court of Appeal to hear the remaining grounds for a new trial. The Ontario Court of Appeal dismissed the remainder of Mr. Jaser's arguments against his conviction, while Mr. Esseghaier withdrew his appeal. Mr. Jaser again sought leave of the Supreme Court to bring another appeal on his remaining arguments. On August 7, 2025, the Supreme Court of Canada dismissed his application for leave to appeal his conviction.
