= ITAC =

ITAC may refer to:

- Integrated Threat Assessment Centre
- Integrated Terrorism Assessment Centre
- Information Technology Architect Certification
