= 2017 Edmonton attack =

Stabbing and vehicle-ramming attack

- Location: Edmonton, Alberta, Canada
- Date: September 30, 2017; 8:15 p.m. (MDT)
- Attack type: Stabbing, Vehicle ramming, Islamic terrorism (suspected)
- Weapons: Knife, car, rental truck
- Injuries: 5
- Perpetrator: Abdulahi Sharif
- Motive: Islamic terrorism
- Convictions: 5 counts of attempted murder

The 2017 Edmonton attack was a stabbing and vehicle-ramming attack that occurred in Edmonton, Alberta, Canada, on September 30, 2017. Edmonton police constable Mike Chernyk was hit and stabbed by 30-year-old Abdulahi Sharif, who then struck four pedestrians with a rental truck during a police chase. Chernyk and all four injured pedestrians survived and were hospitalized. The incident was investigated as a possible Islamist terrorist attack, with police confirming the presence of an Islamic State of Iraq and the Levant flag in the van that rammed the police officer. Sharif was convicted of eleven criminal charges including five counts of attempted murder, but was not charged with terrorism-related offences.

== Attack and pursuit ==
On September 30, 2017, a military appreciation night football game between the Edmonton Eskimos and the Winnipeg Blue Bombers was being held. During the game, a driver deliberately rammed Edmonton police constable Mike Chernyk, who was standing between a barricade and his police car near Commonwealth Stadium in Edmonton at around 8:15 p.m. After exiting his car, the driver stabbed Chernyk before fleeing the scene. Around midnight, a U-Haul rental truck was pulled over at a police checkpoint on Wayne Gretzky Drive and 112 Avenue during a manhunt.

After officers identified the driver as Chernyk's attacker, he drove off with a dozen police vehicles in pursuit. While fleeing police, the man drove into four pedestrians, two of them in an alleyway near 109 Street and Jasper Avenue, and the other two near 107 Street and Jasper Avenue. Eventually, the rental truck was PIT manoeuvred by police at the intersection of 107 Street and 100 Avenue, and the driver was arrested. Police investigated the incident as an act of terrorism.

== Victims ==
The first victim of the attack, Edmonton police constable Mike Chernyk, received several injuries, including stab wounds to his face and hands. He was released from the hospital the following day, returned to work 18 days later, and claimed things had "returned to normal".

The four pedestrians hit by the rental truck suffered various injuries ranging from "broken arms to brain bleeds". Two of them were released from the hospital after treatment the following day. Of the remaining two still hospitalized, one was upgraded from critical condition to stable, and the other suffered a fractured skull but has since regained consciousness.

== Perpetrator ==
The perpetrator, 30-year-old Abdulahi Hasan Sharif, is a Somali national and refugee. In 2011, Sharif was detained by the United States Immigration and Customs Enforcement (ICE) for four months pending deportation to Somalia. He was released with an "order of supervision", but in January 2012, ICE lost track of him. He subsequently claimed refugee status in Canada. He was reported by a colleague to the police after he expressed his hatred for Shia Muslims, polytheists, and expressed support for the Islamic State, which led the RCMP and Edmonton police to investigate him in 2015 for extremism, and was deemed "not a threat". He was arrested for offences including participation in a terrorist attack, commission of an offence for a terrorist group, five counts of attempted murder, dangerous driving, criminal flight causing bodily harm, and possession of a weapon for a dangerous purpose. However, the Crown did not lay any terrorism-related charges against Sharif.

In 2019, Sharif was put on trial for eleven criminal charges: five counts of attempted murder, four counts of criminal flight from police causing bodily harm, one count of aggravated assault and one count of dangerous driving. He pled not guilty to all charges, but was ultimately convicted on all eleven offences. During the trial, he did not retain legal counsel, did not testify in his own defence, or call any witnesses. On December 13, 2019, Sharif was sentenced to a term of imprisonment of 28 years, found entitled to 3.3 years of pre-sentence credit, leaving 24.7 years to serve.

== Responses ==
=== Domestic ===
The attack was quickly condemned by Edmonton mayor Don Iveson, who expressed shock and sadness, thanking first responders and urging citizens to remain calm. Alberta premier Rachel Notley and Canadian Prime Minister Justin Trudeau also condemned the attacks and praised efforts of first responders. Many other politicians issued statements condemning the attacks. Naheed Nenshi, the mayor of Calgary, Alberta, condemned the attack, calling it a "terrible act of violence and hatred", and expressed Calgary's solidarity with Edmonton.

The National Council of Canadian Muslims condemned the attack.

=== International ===
- United States: The White House issued a statement on October 1 condemning the attack, with Press Secretary Sarah Huckabee Sanders describing the attack as "cowardly" and wished victims "a speedy and full recovery". Vice President Mike Pence condemned the attack expressed his condolences to the people of Edmonton on Twitter, stating, "Our hearts and prayers are with the victims & the people of Edmonton & we condemn the cowardly terror attacks that occurred late last night."

== See also ==
- Terrorism in Canada
- Air India Flight 182
- 2014 shootings at Parliament Hill, Ottawa
