= Menacing =

Criminal offense in many U.S. states

Menacing, brandishment or brandishing are criminal offenses in many U.S. states consisting of displaying a weapon with the intent of placing another person in fear of imminent physical injury or death.

The term "brandish" means, with respect to a firearm, to display all or part of the firearm, or otherwise make the presence of the firearm known to another person, in order to intimidate that person, regardless of whether the firearm is directly visible to that person.
— 18 U.S.C. § 924(c)(4).

Such implied threats can constitute extortion if used to coerce a decision. Depending on the jurisdiction, degrees of offense range from a misdemeanor for first-time offenders, to low- to mid-level felonies for offenders with a prior menacing charge. Self-defense is often explicitly given as an exception.

The tangentially related crime of "Menacing By Stalking" was introduced as a new charge in some states following the popularization of laws specifically targeting stalking behavior, in which a perpetrator adopts a long-term pattern of actions designed to frighten and harass a victim while still adhering to the letter of existing harassment laws.

== Laws by state ==
=== Idaho ===
In Idaho, the law on menacing reads as follows:

TITLE 18 CRIMES AND PUNISHMENTS CHAPTER 33 FIREARMS, EXPLOSIVES AND OTHER DEADLY WEAPONS 18-3303.

Exhibition or use of deadly weapon. Every person who, not in necessary self-defense, in the presence of two (2) or more persons, draws or exhibits any deadly weapon in a rude, angry and threatening manner, or who, in any manner, unlawfully uses the same, in any fight or quarrel, is guilty of a misdemeanor. History: [18-3303, added 1972, ch. 336, sec. 1, p. 911.]

=== New York ===
In New York State, a person threatening another person with imminent injury without engaging in physical contact is called "menacing". A person who engages in that behavior is guilty of aggravated harassment in the second degree (a Class A misdemeanor; punishable with up to one year incarceration, probation for an extended time, and a permanent criminal record) when they threaten to cause physical harm to another person, and guilty of aggravated harassment in the first degree (a Class E felony) if they have a previous conviction for the same offense.

=== Ohio ===
In Ohio, the laws on menacing read as follows:

2903.22 Menacing.

(A) No person shall knowingly cause another to believe that the offender will cause physical harm to the person or property of the other person, the other person's unborn, or a member of the other person's immediate family.
(...)

2903.21 Aggravated menacing.

(A) No person shall knowingly cause another to believe that the offender will cause serious physical harm to the person or property of the other person, the other person's unborn, or a member of the other person's immediate family.
(...)

2903.211 Menacing by stalking.

(A) (1) No person by engaging in a pattern of conduct shall knowingly cause another person to believe that the offender will cause physical harm to the other person or cause mental distress to the other person.
(2) No person, through the use of any electronic method of remotely transferring information, including, but not limited to, any computer, computer network, computer program, or computer system, shall post a message with purpose to urge or incite another to commit a violation of division (A)(1) of this section.
(3) No person, with a sexual motivation, shall violate division (A)(1) or (2) of this section.
(...)

=== Oregon ===
In Oregon, the law on menacing states:

163.190
Menacing

(1) A person commits the crime of menacing if by word or conduct the person intentionally attempts to place another person in fear of imminent serious physical injury.
(2) Menacing is a Class A misdemeanor

== See also ==
- Assault
- Battery
- Coercion
- Domestic violence
- Harassment
- Intimidation
- Open carry in the United States
- Reckless endangerment
- Stalking
