= Canadian–Muslim Civil Liberties Association =

Islamic organization based in Ontario, Canada

- Headquarters: Toronto, Ontario, Canada
- Location: Canada

Based in Scarborough, Ontario, the Canadian–Muslim Civil Liberties Association is an independent monitoring group that advises on private and public sector policy.

They have rejected mujahideen preaching by individuals such as Osama bin Laden.

They are represented by General Counsel Faisal Kutty.
