= Intimidation =

Deterring or coercing someone

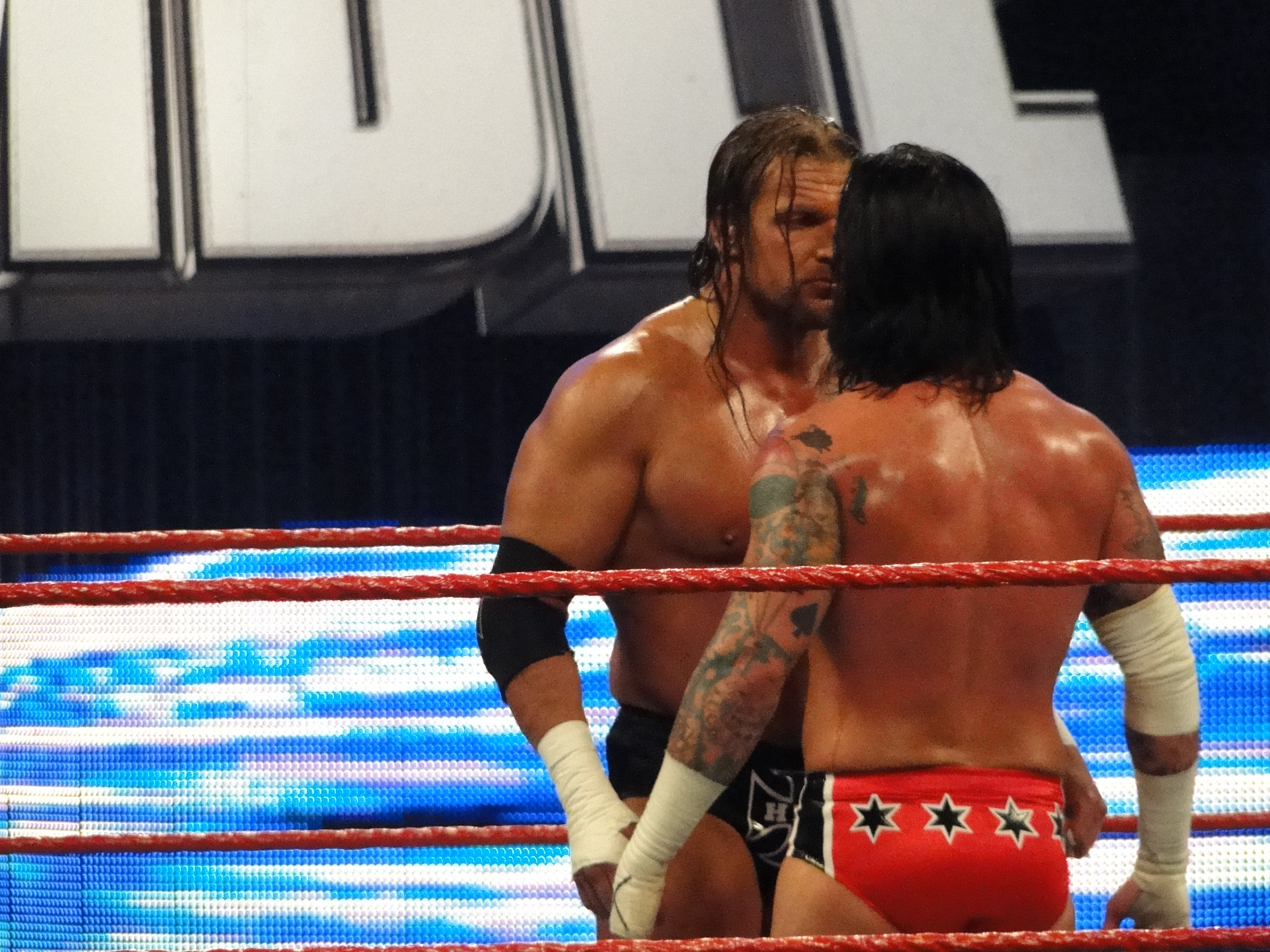
Acted intimidation in professional wrestling as shown by Triple H staring down CM Punk during the 2010 Royal Rumble match

Intimidation is a behavior and legal wrong which usually involves deterring or coercing an individual by threat of violence. It is in various jurisdictions a crime and a civil wrong (tort). Intimidation is similar to menacing, coercion, terrorizing and assault in the traditional sense. (Note: The traditional common law definition of assault of putting the victim in fear/apprehension of harm is maintained in many states; in other states, assault is now defined as the contact itself, having replaced the traditional common law crime of battery. Further, in other states, assault may encompass both the threat and the contact. For more details, see the Assault and battery articles.)

Intimidation includes intentional behaviors of forcing another person to experience general discomfort such as humiliation, embarrassment, inferiority, limited freedom, etc and the victim might be targeted based on multiple factors like gender, race, class, skin color, competency, knowledge, wealth, temperament, etc. Intimidation is done to render the other individual submissive (also known as cowing the other), to destabilize and undermine them, to force compliance, to hide one's insecurities, or to socially valorize oneself. There are active and passive coping mechanisms against intimidation that include, but are not limited to, not letting the intimidator invade your personal dignity and space, addressing their behavior directly, understanding those behaviors as methods to bypass ethical norms and exploit fear as a means of securing compliance or dominance, or sometimes as final straws the person has to achieve their antisocial goals, avoiding the person, being cautious around them, honing breakaway skills, or documenting the behavior, among others. Victims of intimidation would reasonably develop apprehension and experience fear of injury or harm from the unwanted behaviors or tools of intimidation; these include, but are not limited to, condescension, degradation, disparagement, disrespect, patronization, rudeness, and sarcasm. However, it is not legally necessary to prove that the behavior caused the victim to experience terror or panic.

Intimidation as a political process is done through national level threats to compel or deter another country to operate in ways the intimidating country wants it to be, an example of political intimidation is putting an embargo on items that the target country depends through import for forcing their compliance. Certain second and third world countries use terrorism as an intimidation tactic. "A terroristic threat is a crime generally involving a threat to commit violence communicated with the intent to terrorize other." Personal intimidation is considered to be a management strategy to signal/inform potential rivals that they may face significant consequences if they act against the person in charge/management or to get workers in line. Certain forms of intimidation like sexual and racial ones are considered as criminal offense in several civilized countries.

== Description ==
Intimidation is derived from the verb intimidate, which itself comes from the Latin word intimidat meaning "to make timid." Intimidation is defined as an interaction style that emphasizes "bullying, exploiting, or manipulating others, solely for one's own advantage." Intimidation may be employed consciously or unconsciously, and a percentage of people who employ it consciously may do so as the result of selfishly rationalized notions of its appropriation, utility or self-empowerment. Intimidation related to prejudice and discrimination may include conduct "which annoys, threatens, intimidates, alarms, or puts a person in fear of their safety [...] because of a belief or perception regarding such person's race, color, national origin, ancestry, gender, religion, religious practice, age, disability or sexual orientation, regardless of whether the belief or perception is correct."

Intimidation may manifest as coercive, threatening behavior that may include physical contact and glowering countenance, or as emotional manipulation, verbal abuse, debasement, and deliberate embarrassment, and may escalate to actual physical assault. "Behavior may become harassment in forms of epithets, derogatory comments or slurs and lewd propositions, assault, impeding or blocking movement, offensive touching or any physical interference with normal work or movement, and visual insults, such as derogatory posters or cartoons."

Threatening behaviors may be conceptualized as a maladaptive outgrowth of normal competitive urge for interrelational dominance generally seen in animals. Alternatively, intimidation may result from the type of society in which individuals are socialized, as human beings are generally reluctant to engage in confrontation or threaten violence.

Like all behavioral traits, it exists in greater or lesser manifestation in each individual person over time, but may be a more significant "compensatory behavior" for some as opposed to others. Behavioral theorists often see threatening behaviours as a consequence of being threatened by others, including parents, authority figures, playmates and siblings. For self-defense, use of force is justified when a person reasonably believes that it the force is necessary to defend themself or another against the immediate use of unlawful force.

== As a criminal offense ==
=== India, Bangladesh, Pakistan, Malaysia & Singapore ===
Indian Penal Code (IPC), and penal codes of other nations based on IPC such as Singapore Penal Code, Malaysian Penal Code, Pakistan Penal Code, Bangladesh Penal Code, etc make the "criminal intimidation" a punishable offense under sections 503 to 506.

=== United States ===
"Intimidation" is the name of a criminal offence in several U.S. states. The definitions of the crime of Intimidation differ by state.

In Montana, Intimidation is defined as follows:

45-5-203. Intimidation.

(1) A person commits the offence of intimidation when, with the purpose to cause another to perform or to omit the performance of any act, the person communicates to another, under circumstances that reasonably tend to produce a fear that it will be carried out, a threat to perform without lawful authority any of the following acts:

(a) inflict physical harm on the person threatened or any other person;
(b) subject any person to physical confinement or restraint; or
(c) commit any felony.

(2) A person commits the offence of intimidation if the person knowingly communicates a threat or false report of a pending fire, explosion, or disaster that would endanger life or property.
(3) A person convicted of the offence of intimidation shall be imprisoned in the state prison for any term not to exceed 10 years or be fined an amount not to exceed $50,000, or both.

Several states have a crime called "ethnic intimidation". For instance, the law of the state of Michigan reads:

750.147b Ethnic intimidation.

Sec. 147b.

(1) A person is guilty of ethnic intimidation if that person maliciously, and with the specific intent to intimidate or harass another person because of that person's race, colour, religion, gender, or national origin, does any of the following:

(a) Causes physical contact with another person.
(b) Damages, destroys or defaces any real or personal property of another person.
(c) Threatens, by word or act, to do any act described in subdivision (a) or (b), if there is reasonable cause to believe that an act described in subdivision (a) or (b) will occur.

(2) Ethnic intimidation is a felony punishable by imprisonment for not more than 2 years, or by a fine of not more than $5,000.00, or both.
(3) Regardless of the existence or outcome of any criminal prosecution, a person who suffers an injury to his or her person or damage to his or her property as a result of ethnic intimidation may bring a civil cause of action against the person who commits the offence to secure an injunction, actual damages, including damages for emotional distress, or other appropriate relief. A plaintiff who prevails in a civil action brought according to this section may recover both of the following:
(a) Damages in the amount of 3 times the actual damages described in this subsection or $2,000.00, whichever is greater.
(b) Reasonable attorney fees and costs.

Crimes closely related to intimidation are menacing, coercion, terrorizing, and assault.

In California, making criminal threats is a wobbler and may be charged as either a misdemeanor or a felony under California Penal Code 422. A felony criminal threat is a strike under California's three strikes law.

== As a civil offense ==
=== United States ===
Intimidation can also be a civil offense, in addition to a criminal offense, in some U.S. states. For example, in Oregon a violation of the state criminal statute for intimidation results in a civil violation. The plaintiff in the civil suit for intimidation may then secure remedies including an injunction or special and general damages.

== See also ==
- Abusive power and control
- Bullying
- Climate of fear
- Coercion
- Demoralization (warfare)
- Emotional blackmail
- Fear mongering
- Gaslighting
- Gunboat diplomacy
- Guilt trip
- Intimidation of Parliament
- Katagelasticism
- Psychological abuse
- Psychological trauma
- Shock and awe
- Threat
- Verbal aggression
- Witness intimidation
