= Intimidation of Parliament =

Intimidation of Parliament is a criminal law in Canada that makes it a crime to violently intimidate the Parliament of Canada and the provincial legislatures. The maximum sentence is fourteen years. It reads:

Intimidating Parliament or legislature
51. Every one who does an act of violence in order to intimidate Parliament or the legislature of a province is guilty of an indictable offence and liable to imprisonment for a term not exceeding fourteen years.

The law is one of only a handful of criminal offences, including treason and piracy, that are automatically heard by the relevant provincial superior court—composed of federally appointed, salaried, and disciplined judges—rather than the inferior Provincial courts, which are composed of provincially appointed judges. It is a very rare crime. One of the few individuals to be charged with the crime in recent decades was Charles Yacoub who hijacked a Greyhound bus and had it driven onto Parliament Hill in 1989. In his trial, Yacoub was later found not guilty of the particular charge.
