= Charles Yacoub =

Lebanese-Canadian terrorist

Charles Yacoub is a Lebanese-Canadian who hijacked a Greyhound bus and drove it to Parliament Hill in Ottawa, Ontario, Canada in 1989. The eight-hour hostage taking resulted in no casualties, but was a notable incident of domestic terrorism in Canada.

== Life ==
Yacoub was born in Lebanon and moved to Canada in 1976. He settled in the Repentigny suburb of Montreal, became the owner of a jewellery store, married, and had two children.

== Hostage taking ==
On April 7, 1989, Yacoub boarded a Greyhound bus that was travelling from Montreal to New York. At 12:20 pm on the Champlain Bridge, just outside Montreal, Yacoub brandished a .45 calibre semi-automatic handgun. He held the gun to the head of driver Roger Bednarchuk and ordered him to drive to Ottawa. He also held a device which he claimed would detonate a bomb hidden in the back of the bus, though no bomb was ever found. There were nine other passengers on the bus. At the bridge toll booth, he released René Coupal, a former police officer, who then alerted the authorities.

Yacoub was a Lebanese-Christian and claimed to represent the Christian Lebanese Liberation Front, though all later evidence indicated he worked alone. He was upset by the Lebanese Civil War and demanded that Syria remove its forces from the country. He later said that his goal in the event was to draw attention to the situation in Lebanon.

The Sûreté du Québec began to search for the bus, but could not find it believing it was still continuing south. They did not alert the Royal Canadian Mounted Police or Ontario Provincial Police who were caught unawares when it arrived in Ottawa around 2:45 pm. Upon arriving in Ottawa, Yacoub ordered it driven up to Parliament Hill, which was then open to public vehicles. The bus then proceeded onto the lawn of the Parliament Buildings where it became stuck in the spring mud. A long hostage standoff began with Yacoub gradually releasing hostages. Over the course of the event he fired three shots into the ground, though he never threatened to harm the hostages. The parliament was evacuated, and police surrounded the bus. The event, unfolding for hours in the centre of the nation's capital, became a major media story covered live by the country's networks. At 7:55 pm Yacoub released the remaining five hostages and exited the bus, at which point he was taken into custody.

Yacoub faced five charges, and went to trial in 1990. He was convicted of forcible confinement and use of a weapon to commit an offence, but in a surprise to many was acquitted of the more serious charges of hostage taking, intimidation of Parliament, and aggravated assault. While he could have faced life in prison, he was sentenced to only six years in prison.
