= Tarrys =

- Location of Tarrys in British Columbia
- Coordinates: 49°23′09″N 117°33′18″W
- Country: Canada
- Province: British Columbia
- Region: West Kootenay
- Regional District: Central Kootenay
- Area codes: 250, 778, 236, & 672
- Highways: Highway 3A

Tarrys is an unincorporated community spanning both shores of the Kootenay River in the West Kootenay region of southeastern British Columbia. The location, on BC Highway 3A, is by road about 14 kilometres (9 mi) northeast of Castlegar, and 30 kilometres (19 mi) southwest of Nelson.

== Name origin & Tarry family ==
In 1896, James & Lydia Tarry, and children, settled on their Riverview Ranch. By 1901, their 800-acre (3.2 km^{2}) orchard comprised 500 fruit trees, half apple and the rest cherry, plum, pear, and peach. James was a justice of the peace (JP) and president of the West Kootenay Farmers' Institute. Possibly on the stepping down of his father, Frank Tarry became a JP in 1914. On his death in 1917, James was the owner of the largest cleared ranch in the Kootenay Valley.

== Railway ==
In 1906, Tarry Siding, also called Tarrys' Siding, Tarry's, and Tarry, opened on the Columbia and Kootenay Railway. The Canadian Pacific Railway flag stop was 3.2 kilometres (2.0 mi) northeast of Thrums, and 3.7 kilometres (2.3 mi) southwest of Glade. Passenger service ended in the late 1950s.

Train Timetables (Regular stop or Flag stop)
Year	1909	1912	1916	1919	1929	1932	1935	1939	1943	1948	1953	1954	1960
Ref.													
Type	Flag	Flag	Flag	Flag	Reg/Flag	Flag	Flag	Reg/Flag	Flag	Reg/Flag	Flag	Flag	Nil

== Doukhobors ==
During 1910–1925, over 30 Doukhobor families settled.
1911: Uninsured Doukhobor sawmill at Tarry Siding burned to the ground. Rebuilding was immediate to complete the Canadian Pacific Railway tie contract.
1927: Storekeeper was convicted of perjury.
1932: Tarrys Doukhobor Society built a community hall.
1949: Freedomites burned down the new $85,000 Tarrys school.
1958: Children found a cache of blasting fuses and detonator caps at the Freedomite settlement.
1962: Freedomites dynamited West Kootenay Power and Light infrastructure.

== Glade Ferry ==
From the 1910s, the Doukhobors operated the original ferry to serve their settlements on the south shore of the river stretching as far south as Tarrys. Being no schedule, users would yell for the reaction ferry if on the opposite bank. When the Brilliant Dam opened in 1944, the service ceased because of the reduced current. Subsequently, crossings depended upon a community-owned rowboat, and later a privately owned barge and tug. In 1955, the province installed a three-vehicle cable ferry, and moved the landing downstream to the population centre. The vehicle capacity increased to five, and then eight in 1980.

Glade Ferry Rd. parallels the highway southwest for 1.8 kilometres (1.1 mi) from the Glade junction. Geographically, the ferry is 1.1 kilometres (0.7 mi) northeast of Tarrys Rd. and 0.5 kilometres (0.3 mi) northeast of Tarrys fire hall. The 10-vehicles/48-passenger ferry operates under private contract with the British Columbia Ministry of Transportation and is free of tolls, as are all inland ferries in BC.

== Present community ==
Tarrys Fire Department, staffed by volunteers, owns a small fleet of fire trucks. Directly opposite is Kalesnikoff Lumber, the largest industry. However, this sawmill regards itself as being in Thrums, indicating the unclear boundary between the communities, or that Thrums is a generic name for the area that stretches north to Glade.
