= Integrated Terrorism Assessment Centre =

Canadian intelligence organization

The Integrated Terrorism Assessment Centre (ITAC; French: Centre intégré d'évaluation du terrorisme) is an independent federal organization tasked with assessing threats of terrorism to Canada and Canadian interests abroad. It is the only federal organization with the specific responsibility of analyzing terrorism threats related to Canada.

ITAC is responsible for assessing and recommending the National Terrorism Threat Level, used by the Canadian government and law enforcement agencies to "mitigate the potential effects of terrorism incidents in Canada and abroad." Administratively, ITAC functions as a component of Canadian Security Intelligence Service (CSIS) and is subject to the CSIS Act. However, operationally, it is independent of CSIS and is accountable to the National Security Advisor, rather than the Director of CSIS.

Co-located with CSIS in Ottawa, the ITAC is a cooperative initiative that facilitates intelligence information sharing and analysis within the Canadian intelligence community and to first responders, such as law enforcement.

== History ==
In 2003, the government of Paul Martin established the Integrated Threat Assessment Centre following the environment that followed the September 11 attacks in the US as well as the 2002–2004 SARS outbreak, among other things. The ITAC officially became operational the following year, on 15 October 2004.

In 2008, the government of Stephen Harper changed the group's mandate to prioritize terrorist threats to Canadians and Canadian interests. The ITAC was subsequently renamed the Integrated Terrorism Assessment Centre in June 2011, emphasizing its focus on terrorism.

== Partners ==
Co-located with CSIS in Ottawa, the ITAC is a cooperative initiative that facilitates intelligence information sharing and analysis within the Canadian intelligence community and to first responders, such as law enforcement.

Domestic partners include:

- Canadian Armed Forces
- Canada Border Services Agency
- Canada Revenue Agency
- Canadian Security Intelligence Service
- Communications Security Establishment
- Correctional Service of Canada
- Department of National Defence
- Financial Transactions and Reports Analysis Centre of Canada
- Global Affairs Canada
- Ontario Provincial Police
- Privy Council Office
- Public Safety Canada
- Royal Canadian Mounted Police
- Sûreté du Québec
- Transport Canada

International partners include:

- Australia National Threat Assessment Centre
- New Zealand Combined Threat Assessment Group
- U.S. National Counterterrorism Center
- U.K. Joint Terrorism Analysis Centre

== National Terrorism Threat Level ==
The National Terrorism Threat Level (NTTL) is a tool used by Canadian government officials, including law enforcement agencies, to identify risks and vulnerabilities from threats of terrorism in Canada. It represents the probability of a violent act of terrorism occurring in Canada, based on information and intelligence. Assessment and recommendation of the NTTL is the responsibility of the Integrated Terrorism Assessment Centre.

The NTTL was formalized in early October 2014 when the threat level was first raised in Canada, anticipating incidents like the two that occurred later that month—the Saint-Jean-sur-Richelieu ramming attack and the shootings at Parliament Hill. In addition to mitigating the potential effects of terrorism incidents in Canada and abroad, its key benefit is that it helps to ensure a common understanding of the general terrorist threat to Canada.

As of 22 May 2021, Canada's current level is "Medium," which means that a "violent act of terrorism could occur;" it has been at this level since October 2014. More specifically, this means that "extremist groups and individuals located in Canada and abroad, have both the intent AND capability to carry out an act of terrorism in Canada."

Threat Level assessments are conducted every four months at a minimum, or more frequently if needed.

Canada's National Terrorism Threat Levels
Level	Likelihood of violent act of terrorism	Measures in place
Very low	"highly unlikely"	"Measures are in place to keep Canadians safe."
Low	"possible but unlikely"	"Measures are in place to keep Canadians safe."
Medium	"could occur"	"Additional measures are in place to keep Canadians safe."
High	"likely"	"Heightened measures are in place to keep Canadians safe. Canadians are informed what action to take."
Critical	"highly likely and could occur imminently"	"Exceptional measures are in place to keep Canadians safe. Canadians are informed what action to take."

== See also ==
- Terrorism in Canada
- Terror alert system
