= Charities Directorate of Canada =

Part of Federal Ministry of National Revenue

- Formation: 1967
- Headquarters: Ottawa
- Location: Canada
- Director General: Sharmila Khare
- Website: www.canada.ca/en/services/taxes/charities.html

Charities Directorate of Canada is part of the Federal Ministry of National Revenue, and is responsible for reviewing the applications for charity registration, as well as auditing and maintaining accountability through education and responsible enforcement. They work to count and monitor the registered charities operating in Canada in the fairest way possible. As of December 2014, there were 86,193 charities registered in the directorate. The Directorate is located in Ottawa, in the Canada Revenue Agency (CRA) offices.

== Charity status ==
=== Definition ===
To gain charity status, organizations must first register with the federal Canada Revenue Agency as a charitable organization under the Income Tax Act. To be eligible for charitable tax status, charities need to provide a public benefit, such as poverty relief or education, and they are limited in their business and political activities, including making profit or engaging in partisan behavior. These limitations are to ensure that charities keep to their primary goals and do not abuse their special status. While charities and non-profits are similar, not all non-profit organizations qualify as charities. Charities and non-profits may be endowed with different rights and responsibilities.

=== Benefits ===
Charitable status grants organizations exemption from income tax and provides the power to issue donation receipts, eligibility to receive gifts from fellow registered charities, and exempts goods and services provided by the charity from sales tax.

=== Special donor status ===
Certain donees have the ability to issue their own donation receipts like the Registered Canadian Amateur athletic association (RCAAA), foreign charities accepting gifts from the Head of the Commonwealth, universities outside of Canada and the United Nations.

=== Obligations ===
Registered charities have obligations linked to the status: they must devote and maintain control and direction of all of their resources while keeping them aligned with their purpose, they must file their T3010 Registered Charity Information Return annually, keep reliable records and books of activities, and they must maintain their status as a Canadian legal entity.

==== Political action ====
Prior to 2018, there were limitations as to how charities could intervene in political affairs. Political activities were coordinated or subordinate to the charity's purpose; there were in no way partisan; and they had to provide expense records related to such activities in their T3010 forms.The Directorate had defined political activities as encouraging and mobilizing the public to try to change specific public policy, law or government decisions, or to engage in partisan activities. Public awareness and education are considered acceptable by the Canada Revenue Agency, as long as the information is sound and the content is not overly emotive. Public policy dialogue and development activities by charities (PPDDAs) for poverty relief, education, or religious organizations reinforce the charity's purpose if they are related to its stated purpose and provide a benefit to the public (see Policy statement CPS-024, Guidelines for registering a charity: Meeting the public benefit test)”.

== Legislation ==
=== Establishing Law ===
The Charities Directorate of the Canada Revenue Agency is delegated authority by the Minister of National Revenue to enforce provisions on registered charities and qualified donees under the Canadian Income Tax Act.

== Activities of the Directorate ==
=== Ensuring Compliance ===
The Charities Directorate is responsible for federal regulations on registered charities in Canada under the Income Tax Act, particularly compliance with information reporting requirements to maintain transparency and public accountability (Prime Minister mandate letter to relevant minister:. To enable compliance with the Income Tax Act, registered charities must issue donation receipts for individual and corporate donations and are required to file annual tax returns. Compliance measures include education letters; compliance agreements, sanctions, including financial penalties; suspension of charities’ tax-receipting privileges as well as their status as qualified donees; and ultimately the revocation of charitable registration. The Directorate has the power to revoke the status of registered charities if they fail to file annual information returns, fail to spend their resources primarily on public benefit purposes, engage in partisan political activities, issue false gift receipts, or make gifts to other registered charities conditional on gifts in kind. The Charities Directorate auditing program is intended to maintain public confidence in registered charities. Beginning in the 2000s, the Charities Directorate has increased its unofficial mandate to include education of charities on regulatory compliance although this is still minimal. Some of the educational measures the Charities Directorate has taken to increase educational awareness include public outreach through YouTube videos, social media and the CRA website.

=== Information Collection ===
The main activity of the Canada Revenue Agency (CRA) is the collection of the T3010 annual information return, which describes the activities of all registered charities throughout the course of the year. The T3010 form also provides information to the public about registered charities' activities. The T1236 form, Qualified Donees Worksheet, provides detailed information about the money given from one registered charity to another. As of 2023, the government now also collects information through the T1441 for non qualified donnees.

=== Information Publishing ===
As of 2019, the Canada Revenue Agency website provides a search function to the public to check the status of Canadian charities in order to help individuals' donation decision making. The contact information, activities, and financial information of all registered charities are available. Recently, accountability has been increased due to Canada’s commitment to open data, as noted in a 2018 report entitled "OPENING CANADA’S T3010 CHARITY INFORMATION RETURN DATA".

Since 2013 the CRA has made efforts to be more transparent through its data portal. This portal is publicly accessible on the government’s website.

== History and Recent Developments ==
In 1967, the first registration of charities with the government occurred through the Department of National Revenue (the federal tax department at the time, later renamed Revenue Canada and, from 2005, the Canada Revenue Agency). This led to the creation of the branch that would later deal with the eligibility and regulation of registered charities. This registration began as a means to mitigate tax fraud over tax discrepancies.

In 2013, the Director General released a statement giving an overview of how the Directorate works and recent statistics of efficiency. In 2014, the second update of the kind was released, covering new initiatives by the Directorate, along with an updated list of tools and statistics. In 2015, the last of these updates was posted. It presents an overview of legislative updates, auditing guidelines, specific limitations and staff changes.

On December 13, 2018, Bill C-86 received Royal Assent, which permits charities in the directorate to pursue political activities and policy-making as long as it is in line with the charities' purpose. This excludes direct or indirect action concerning political parties or public office candidates.

In 2019, the CRA amended its definition of political activities; now only requesting if the organization had any public policy dialogue and development activities (PPDAs) and to explain them. Recent controversy over the ability of U.S. donors to give to Canadian organizations could influence important cross-border issues, in particular those relating to oil pipelines. This has raised accusations of foreign intervention into Canadian affairs. Canadian federal tax legislation differentiates between Canadian nonprofit organizations and registered charities; Canadian nonprofit organizations (but not registered charities) can seek funding from US donors.

After the 2022 Canadian Freedom Convoy, concerns about foreign funding and political influence on Canadian charities have been raised. Tamara Lich, one of the key organizers of the Canadian Freedom Convoy, has received financial support to fight criminal charges laid against her from a right-wing Canadian charity called the Justice Centre For Constitutional Freedoms. Some experts call into question whether supporting a person against criminal charges falls in line with one of the four goals of Canadian charities.

== Sources ==
- "Opening Canada's T3010 Charity Information Return Data". odimpact.org. ("OPENING CANADA’S T3010 CHARITY INFORMATION RETURN DATA Accountability of Charities through Open Data")
