= Thrums =

Unincorporated community in British Columbia, Canada

- Location of Thrums in British Columbia
- Coordinates: 49°20′35″N 117°35′31″W
- Country: Canada
- Province: British Columbia
- Region: West Kootenay
- Regional District: Central Kootenay
- Area codes: 250, 778, 236, & 672
- Highways: Highway 3A

Thrums is an unincorporated community on the northwest shore of the Kootenay River in the West Kootenay region of southeastern British Columbia. The location, on BC Highway 3A, is by road about 11 kilometres (7 mi) northeast of Castlegar, and 33 kilometres (21 mi) southwest of Nelson.

== Name origin ==
J.M. Barrie, Peter Pan author, also wrote Auld Licht Idylls, A Window in Thrums, and The Little Minister, set in the fictional Scottish village of Thrums. In 1900, the second book in the trilogy gave Thrums, BC, a railway switch, its name. The suggested proponent/s are Robert W. and Janie A.S. Chalmers (a farming couple who settled around this time), an unknown female train passenger, or the daughter of an unspecified Canadian Pacific Railway (CP) director.

== Railway ==
CP's adding of this Columbia and Kootenay Railway siding to the timetable in 1900 may have been merely as a designated siding. The flag stop, which appeared around 1905 was 5.8 kilometres (3.6 mi) northeast of Brilliant, and 3.2 kilometres (2.0 mi) southwest of Tarry's. Passenger service ended in 1964.

Train Timetables (Regular stop or Flag stop)
Year	1905	1909	1912	1916	1919	1929	1932	1935	1939	1943	1948	1953	1954	1961	1963
Ref.															
Type	Flag	Flag	Flag	Flag	Flag	Flag	Flag	Reg/Flag	Reg/Flag	Flag	Reg/Flag	Flag	Flag	Flag	Flag

== Early community ==
Fruit growing was initially the main industry, which transformed to farming over time. The Chalmers, longtime residents from Scotland, also raised poultry. A general store opened in the 1910s. Becoming predominantly a Doukhobor community, the Thrums Cemetery opened in 1912. Operated by the Union of Spiritual Communities of Christ (USCC) from 1940 until the 1970s, the site is now disused and overgrown. Several stores operated by the 1940s. The Chalmers ran a small store and tea room called The Window from the early 1940s.

The population was about 150 by 1928, 250 by 1934, 174 by 1939, 387 by 1943, 250 by 1946, and 218 by 1951. The post office, which opened in 1906, did not reopen after burning down in 1978.

== Freedomites ==
Various incidents linked to the Freedomites:
1930: Attempted arson of community hall and damage by explosives to school.
1932: Parading in nude prompted 118 arrests and three-year sentences.
1938: Church burned.
1946: Doukhobor hall destroyed by fire.
1947: Barns burned.
1958: Nearby gas pipeline dynamited.
1959: Three feet of CP track dynamited.

== Present community ==
A market/deli and small businesses operate. Since Thrums can be used as a generic name for the area that stretches north to Glade, the boundary with Tarrys is unclear.

== Notable people ==
Joe Irving (1911–2015), author, ironworker activist, graduated high school in his 90s, and centenarian, was the first baby born in Thrums.
