= Project Shock =

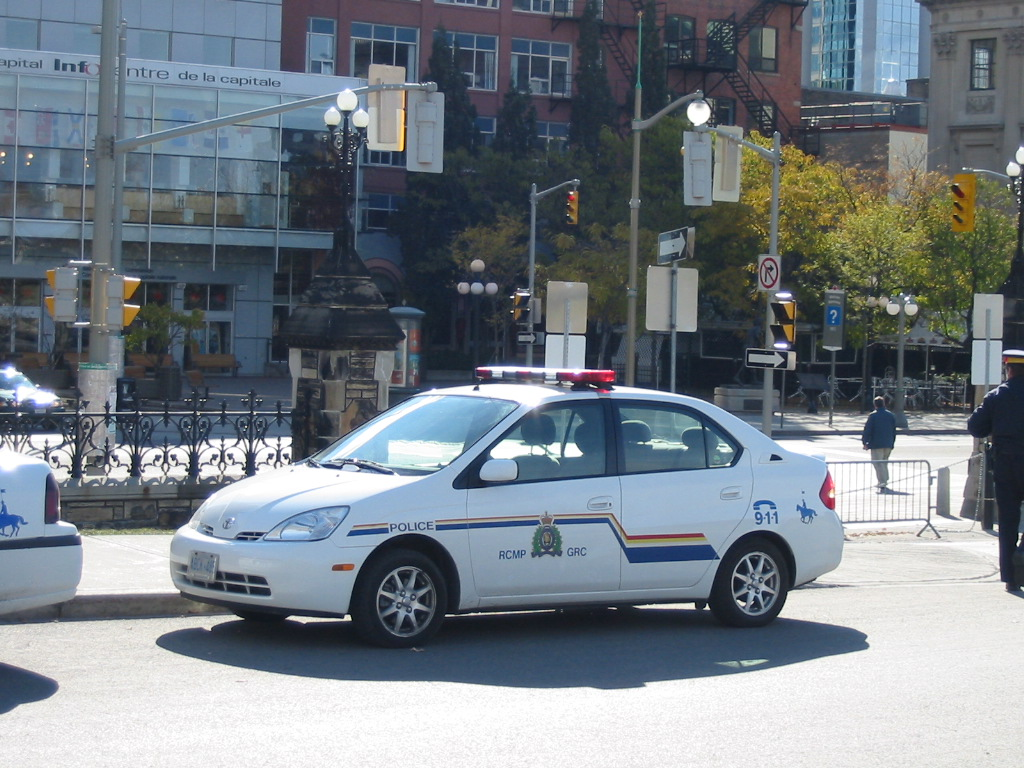
An RCMP vehicle sits in Ottawa

In the ten days immediately following the September 11 attacks in the United States in 2001, the Royal Canadian Mounted Police (RCMP) initiated Project Shock which sought to quickly collect and act on any information or rumors related to possible threats posed by Muslims in Canada.

The authorities noted that "many of the tangible and intangible barriers were taken down", allowing the RCMP previously disallowed access to government files, permission to give such information to foreign governments and send copies of hard drives seized in raids to Americans. It was ostensibly the first time the RCMP had been allowed to mix intelligence gathering and law enforcement since the 1981 Royal Commission of Inquiry into Certain Activities of the RCMP, which had revealed a number of scandals surrounding the RCMP Security Service, and led to the dissolution of the unit.

Six years later the Privacy Commissioner of Canada, Jennifer Stoddart, noted that similar tips proved "little more than public hysteria during a time of crisis", and in 2009 explained the database as "information that they thought might have been of strategic importance", but that it had been closed down.

== Role ==
The Canadian taxpayer really does not want to see the $60 million allocated for the protection of the nation end up as compensation for lawsuits and human rights violations.

— Asian Pacific Post

The RCMP unit acted under the supervision of the National Security Investigations Branch, and seconded members of local authorities, like the Calgary Police Service, to their division. They were given a $60 million budget, and told that "the goals...were prevention first, then intelligence gathering, and lastly, prosecution".

The project ultimately arrested 20 Canadians and accused them of links to terrorism. It also led the creation of Integrated National Security Enforcement Teams. Many other Canadians were discovered to have entered the country illegally, and some possessed false identification.

One officer threatened to launch a lawsuit for the "racist bent and bigotry" he believed his superior was practising.
