= Passenger Protect =

Passenger Protect, commonly referred to as the Canadian no-fly list, is the Canadian government initiative to identify individuals who may be an "immediate threat to aviation security" and prevent them from boarding a flight,

The program consists of two main components: a "Specified Persons List" which includes the name, birth date, and gender of individuals believed to pose a security threat, and a set of "Identity Screening Regulations" requiring all passengers who appear to be 18 years of age or older to present valid government-issued ID before they are allowed to board a flight. The list itself contains 1250 ± 750 names. Individuals who are denied boarding because their name appears on the list can submit an appeal to the Office of Reconsideration, which is a part of Transport Canada.

The Passenger Protect Programs implementation date was June 18, 2007 for Canadian domestic flights and international flights to and from Canada.

== How the program works ==
Airlines compare the names of individuals intending to board flights with the names on the specified persons list, and verify with the individual's government-issued identification when there is a name match. Identification is verified in person at the airport check-in counter. Transport Canada works with air carriers to provide training for agents and staff who are involved in implementing the ID verification requirement, and establish procedures that respect the rights of passengers. When the airline verifies that an individual matches in name, date of birth and gender with someone on the list, the airline is required to inform Transport Canada.

A Transport Canada officer is on duty 24 hours a day, every day, to receive calls from airlines when they have a potential match with a specified person on the list. The Transport Canada officer verifies information with the airline and makes a decision based on all the information whether to issue an emergency direction that the individual poses an immediate threat to aviation security and should not be permitted to board the flight.

== Controversy ==
A number of civil society organizations have raised objections to the Passenger Protect program, citing concerns about civil liberties, privacy, racial profiling, and the perceived failure of the US no-fly list. In addition, Canada's official federal and provincial privacy commissioners have criticized various aspects of the program.

Lawyer Faisal Kutty filed submissions against the initiative on behalf of more than two dozen groups titled "Too Guilty to Fly, Too Innocent to Charge?" He also wrote an op-ed about the ineffectiveness of the no-fly list.

== See also ==
- Canadian Air Carrier Protection Program
