= Faisal Kutty =

Canadian journalist, lawyer, law professor, activist

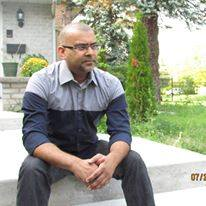
- Born: Valanchery, Kerala, India
- Citizenship: Canada
- Occupations: Lawyer, law professor, public speaker, writer, and activist

Academic background
- Education: York University; University of Ottawa Faculty of Law; Osgoode Hall Law School

Academic work
- Institutions: Valparaiso University Law School; Osgoode Hall Law School of York University; Dwayne O. Andreas School of Law
- Website: themuslimlawyer.com

Faisal Kutty is a Canadian lawyer, academic, writer, public speaker, and activist focused on human rights, civil liberties, international law, comparative law, international affairs, media bias, and national security. He is currently a full-time Professor of Law at Southwestern Law School in Los Angeles. He served as an adjunct professor at Osgoode Hall Law School and is an Associate Professor of Law Emeritus at Valparaiso University. He has previously taught at Dwayne O. Andreas School of Law of Barry University and guest lectured at dozens of universities around North America.

His columns regularly appear in The Toronto Star, Newsweek, Al Jazeera English, Middle East Eye, Zeteo, The Hill Times and Madhyamam. His columns previously appeared in the National Post and The Express Tribune. He previously served as the Canadian correspondent for the Washington Report on Middle East Affairs.

He blogged at the Huffington Post. His articles have appeared in other publications around the world, including The Globe and Mail, Toronto Star, Arab News, Counterpunch, The Indian Express, The Jakarta Post, Al-Ahram Weekly and Al Jazeera.

== Early life ==
Faisal Kutty is a Canadian. His parents are Shaikh Ahmad Kutty and mother Zuhra Kutty. According to his website www.TheMuslimLawyer.com he grew up in Kerala, Montreal and Toronto. He also spent some time in Ottawa.

== Career ==
Kutty first practiced law with a major downtown Toronto law firm, and on his own before co-founding a law firm with Khalid Baksh. They appear to have parted ways and Kutty was joined by Naseer (Irfan) Syed and Akbar Mohamed. Kutty was in the forefront of a number controversial and high-profile legal issues, including the introduction of anti-terror laws in Canada, the Maher Arar fiasco, the no-fly list (Passenger Protect), the religious law arbitration controversy, the 2006 Ontario terrorism plot, and the Niqab controversy, among others. His strong positions on controversial topics has attracted both admirers and critics.

Kutty served as the first Islamic culture and practice content consultant for Little Mosque on the Prairie, a Canadian sitcom that aired on the Canadian Broadcasting Corporation. Kutty was responsible to provide advice and feedback on accuracy in terms of the portrayal of Islamic normative practices and Muslim culture.

=== Meeting with House Homeland Security Subcommittee on Intelligence ===
On July 17, 2006, Kutty was invited by the Consulate General of the United States in Toronto to meet with four members of House Homeland Security Subcommittee on Intelligence, Republicans Rob Simmons of Connecticut and Jim Gibbons of Nevada, along with Democrats Zoe Lofgren of California and Donna Christensen of the U.S. Virgin Islands. The group on a "fact-finding" mission met with senior officials of the Canadian Security Intelligence Service, the Royal Canadian Mounted Police and the Ontario Provincial Police for technical briefings on the operation that led to the 2006 Ontario terrorism plot arrest of 18 suspects in an alleged "homegrown" terrorist cell.

According to a Toronto Star report the politicians also spent time with several members of Toronto's Muslim community, including Faisal Kutty, who was vice-chair of the Canadian Council on American Islamic Relations and general counsel for the Canadian Muslim Civil Liberties Association. At the one-hour meeting at the Royal York Hotel, they were told that "Canada is neither a breeding ground nor a safe haven for terrorists." Kutty told Robert Benzie of the Toronto Star that "we basically said you have to look at the root causes of these things." He added that you can have security concerns, "but if you don't (act) within the confines of the rule of law and due process and within a democratic model, you're going to breed more terrorists and not less," said Kutty.

=== Toronto Terror 18 case ===
Kutty was active in the 2006 Ontario terrorism plot case. Initially he represented an individual who negotiated with the RCMP and CSIS to serve as a witness for the state against one particular accused. He was later retained by various family members and community organizations to assist with the Canadian Coalition for Peace and Justice (CCPJ). The CCPJ filed submission on behalf of some of the arrested with the United Nations Human Rights Council, Fourth Universal Periodic Review Canada (2008). Kutty, alleged on behalf of the CCPJ that Canada was in breach of its international commitments pursuant to various provisions of the Universal Declaration of Human Rights; the International Covenant on Civil and Political Rights; the International Covenant on Economic, Social and Cultural Rights; the Standard Minimum Rules for Treatment of Prisoners adopted by the First United Nations Congress in 1955; and the Basic Principles for the Treatment of Prisoners adopted by the United Nations General Assembly in 1990. He called on the Human Rights Council to investigate these allegations.

Kutty told The New York Times that whatever the outcome of the current trial, police and national security agencies have lost the trust of many Muslims in Toronto. "They've gone from one plus one equals two to one plus one equals five," said Kutty, "We're not questioning their right to try these individuals, if there's evidence. But there is an ethical issue here about taking troubled young teens who had certain beliefs and thoughts and then sending in someone who is young and charismatic to egg them on."

=== Canadian Security Intelligence Service and terrorism ===
Kutty has been a spokesperson and advocate against the excesses of anti-terror legislation and policies. He co-founded the Canadian Muslim Civil Liberties Association in 1994 while still a law student. He helped co-found and served as legal counsel and vice chair of the National Council of Canadian Muslims (NCCM), a Muslim civil liberties & advocacy organization in Canada. The NCCM was previously known as the CAIR-CAN, the Canadian Council on American Islamic Relations.

He has been critical of the Canadian Security Intelligence Service and the Royal Canadian Mounted Police. He attacks CSIS practices targeted at the Muslim and Arab communities, and includes police, the government and the media:

Kutty along with his partner Akbar Sayed Mohamed acted for the CMCLA and CAIR-CAN in their intervention in the Commission of Inquiry into the investigation of the bombing of Air India Flight 182.

Kutty was also involved with the case of Maher Arar, a Canadian accused of terrorism by the United States and held without charges in both the United States and Syria. A Canadian commission later cleared Arar of any links to terrorism, and the government of Canada later settled out of court with Arar. He received C$10.5 million and Prime Minister Stephen Harper formally apologized to Arar for Canada's role in his "terrible ordeal". At the time Kutty argued that:

Arar settlement in Canada does not close the book. It only opens a new chapter of a book that is about more than Maher Arar — it is about the erosion of civil and human rights in Canada as a result of the "War on Terror." The Arar saga brought into focus the unintended victims of draconian laws and policies hastily enacted post 9/11 in Canada and south of the border. It also shed light on the potential of religious and racial profiling inherent in such laws and practices. We can only hope that Arar's second wish which was to "make sure this does not happen to any other Canadian citizens in the future," will also come true. For this to happen, however, more people must realize that due process and fundamental rights must be respected at all times and more so during times of real or perceived crisis when society has a tendency to overreact.

== Passenger Protect ==
He is an opponent of Canada's no-fly list, known as Passenger Protect. At the time of its enactment, he filed submissions against the initiative on behalf of more than two dozen groups titled "Too Guilty to Fly, Too Innocent to Charge?" He also wrote an 'op-ed' about the ineffectiveness of the no-fly list.

=== "Islamic law" in North America ===
In 2003, a group of Muslims in Ontario attempted to set up a tribunal to help Muslims resolves disputes using Islamic principles under the Arbitration Act. A huge outcry resulted and the Ontario government appointed former Attorney General Marion Boyd to look into the matter. In December 2004, Marion Boyd released a study that recommended that the Ontario government permit the adoption of sharia tribunals for Muslims who wished to have family arbitration disputes settled in that manner. Kutty commented on this report on behalf of various Muslim groups. He wrote that the purported banning of faith-based arbitration was a delayed opportunity for the indigenization of Islamic law in the North American context.

=== Link to Islamists ===
Some critics claim that he is an Islamist supporter and terrorist sympathizer. He has acted for or represented many individuals and groups accused of terror connections. IRFAN-Canada, an organization that had its charitable status revoked was represented by another lawyer associated with Faisal Kutty and KSM Law, Naseer (Irfan) Syed. The group is appealing the decision and the designation.

Some point to his invitation in 2007 to serve as international trial observer at military trials of political dissidents who were allegedly members of the then banned but tolerated Muslim Brotherhood. He was reportedly invited by the opposition members of the Egyptian Parliament, International Human Rights Groups and the Egyptian Lawyers Syndicate. Initially 226 were going to face these military trials but the number was reduced to 40. On April 15, 2008 a military tribunal at the Haikstip military base on the outskirts of Cairo sentenced Muslim Brotherhood Deputy Supreme Guide Khairat el-Shater and 24 other civilians, seven of them in absentia, to prison terms of up to 10 years. The tribunal acquitted 15 others. The court also ordered the seizure of millions of dollars in assets belonging to the convicted men and their businesses. When Faisal was in Egypt he told a press conference:

"I came here as an independent Human Rights monitor, an independent Human Rights lawyer from Canada to provide my support to make sure that this will come to an end. We want Egypt to have more respect to the International community, and much more respect to Human Rights. And my support here is not to any political party or political movement at all, it’s rather for human rights, the universal principles of Human Rights which Egypt, in my opinion, transgressed in 1982, and is doing that again now for political aims."

During the visit he reportedly met with Mohamed Morsi who went on to become the fifth president of Egypt and was subsequently deposed by the military. His Facebook also shows that he met with Mohamed Beltagy a member of parliament from 2005 to 2010, and current the general secretary of the Freedom and Justice Party which is linked to the Muslim Brotherhood. The Facebook photos also reveal that he met with Dr. Dr. Ahmed Abu Baraka the Freedom and Justice Party's former legal adviser and a senior party leader at the time; Prof. Islam Lofty a former MB youth leader who has since been excommunicated; and other leaders of the movement.

Even prior to this visit he had written about the MB. In a piece titled "No Democracy Without Risks" he wrote that to prevent radicalization of the Muslim world, including Egypt, it is imperative that the secular world, as well as Muslim world leadership, begin by accepting the global reality, whether they like it or not, that Islamists will be long-term players in the future of many Muslim nations. He argued that consistent with this reality, the secular world must rethink its attitude toward moderate groups such as the Brotherhood. He called for true democratic inclusion, a call for Egyptian government accountability for its poor human right record and a drive towards productive dialogue between the government and opposition groups. Unless these steps are taken, the distrust between the Islamists and the secular world will only lead to international instability, he argued. Radicals who call for confrontation will replace movements such as the Brotherhood, which has striven for peaceful change for more than 65 years.

Though it is clear from his writings that he supports Islamic reform and democratization in the Islamic world. This is evident from his reformist writings in various areas and a book review he published in The Globe and Mail.

Despite the cloud of suspicion raised by critics, in 2013, Kutty's law office was instrumental in facilitating the tip off from a Toronto Imam which led to the arrests of two suspects in an alleged terror plot. He wrote in the Toronto Star that a tipoff from a prominent Imam facilitated through his office played a role in the arrests:

"...the government must understand that the majority of Muslims, who are neither secular nor ultra-orthodox, hold the key to any serious and productive bridge-building. If government agencies believe they can win the "war on terror" by undermining front-line soldiers, they had better think again."

== Positions ==
=== Drone attacks ===
Kutty argues that the use of drones creates "blowback" and undermines core principles of American identity. He cites statistics from the Bureau of Investigative Journalism, Amnesty International, Human Rights Watch and the conclusions of reports issued by Henry L. Stimson Center and a joint report issued by Stanford Law School/New York University School of Law to make his case.

=== Islamic law and adoptions ===
He has called for reforms in the area of Islam and adoptions citing how contemporary practice clashes with the spirit behind the Quran's calls to take care of orphans.

Kutty argues that the belief that closed adoption, as practiced in the West, is the only acceptable form of permanent childcare is a significant obstacle to its acceptance among many Muslims. Kutty believes that there is sufficient basis in Islamic jurisprudence to argue for qualified support of adoptions and even international adoptions. He writes that it is undeniable that taking care of orphans and foundlings is a religious obligation and that the best interest of children has been a recurrent theme among the various juristic schools. Arguably one of the best ways to take care of these children is to place them in loving homes, provided that a child's lineage is not intentionally negated or concealed. He argues that a reformed model of Islamic adoptions will enable Muslims to fulfill this religious obligation while ensuring that the most vulnerable do not fall through technical cracks and will not be negatively impacted by formal rules that no longer serve their intended purposes.

=== Niqab or face veils ===
He does not believe that face veils are mandatory according to the most authentic interpretations of Islamic law but he defends the rights of women to choose to wear them in a liberal democratic society. He further argues that scholars are unanimous in holding that the face must be uncovered during circumambulation of the Kaaba in Mecca, during what is arguably considered a peak moment of Islamic spirituality.

=== Islam and same-sex marriage ===
He also entered the same-sex marriage debate fray in an article titled "Muslims and Same Sex Marriage: Why the Banning of Gay Marriage May Not Be Required by Islamic Legal Norms" published by the Huffington Post on March 27, 2014. The piece argues that there is sufficient basis within Islamic jurisprudence to not oppose same-sex marriages in a liberal democratic context. The article notes that the current debate is not about changing Islamic marriage (nikah), but about making "sure that all citizens have access to the same kinds of public benefits." The piece argues that while same-sex marriage advocates can demand their full constitutional entitlements, they should not interfere in the religious dogma of others by forcing them to approve of what they sincerely believe is wrong.

=== Blasphemy and free speech ===
Kutty has argued that existing blasphemy laws in Muslim nations are anti-Islamic and must be reformed. In a 2014 Huffington Post article he wrote:

There is, of course, strong precedent in the Islamic legal tradition to argue that blasphemous speech targeted at any religion should be restricted, but at the same time there is scholarly consensus around the notion that there is no criminal or worldly sanction mandated... So where does the confusion arise from? It appears that many Islamic jurists conflated blasphemy and apostasy. As prominent classical and contemporary scholars such as Ibn Taymiyyah, Mahmood Shaltut, Mohamed Hashim Kamali and Rabb, among others, have examined the context of the ruling on apostasy and concluded that death was only mandated even in the case of apostasy when it was combined with war against the community...In other words, classical Islamic law interpretations stipulated death as a punishment when apostasy was combined with treason and rebellion against the state, not for blasphemy.

Prior to that, in a 2012 article titled "Free Expression and An Elusive Middle Ground: Part One" published by the JURIST, he expressed a view that it is not only Muslims who wish to restrict free speech, referencing a number of laws throughout Europe that restrict free speech.

== Personal ==
Kutty is married. He has two sisters and one brother. He is the son of Canadian Islamic scholar Ahmad Kutty and brother of Canadian author S.K. Ali.

== Awards and recognition ==
Kutty was included in The 500 Most Influential Muslims in the World in 2010, 2011, 2012, 2013, 2014, 2015 and 2016. The List is compiled by The Royal Islamic Strategic Studies Institute and is affiliated with the Royal Aal al-Bayt Institute for Islamic Thought.

Kutty has received many awards during his career, including:

- 2012: iCair Civil Rights Award from the Cleveland chapter of the Council on American Islamic Relations (CAIR)
- 2007: Maher Arar and Monia Mazigh Award in Civil and Human Rights, from Maher Arar/Monia Mazigh and the Canadian Muslim Network, for his work in advancing civil and human rights in Canada
- 2004 he was awarded the Professional Excellence Award by the American Federation of Muslims from India.
- 2003: Community Service Award from the Toronto Community Resources Consultants for his work in advancing human rights in Toronto

== Works ==
He is a regular contributor to The Toronto Star, Newsweek, and The Express Tribune. His work also appears in Al Jazeera English, Zeteo News and the Middle East Eye. His writings have also appeared in many newspapers and magazines, including the Toronto Star, The Globe and Mail, Arab News, Alahram Weekly, Northwest Indiana Post-Tribune, Counterpunch, and Lawyers Weekly, National Post among dozens of others. His work appears regularly in JURIST.

- Book Review, The Globe and Mail, Jul 9, 2009, (Nader Hashemi, Islam, Secularism and Liberal Democracy: Toward a New Democratic Theory for the Muslim Socieites (Oxford University Press, Oxford, 2009)).
- Non-Western Societies Have Influenced Human Rights in Opposing Viewpoints: Human Rights 41 (Jacqueline Langwith ed., 2007).
- The Shari'a Factor in International Commercial Arbitration, 28 Loy. L.A. Int'l & Comp. L. Rev. 565 (2006).
- Book Review, Am. J. Islamic Soc. Sci., Volume 19, Number 2 (2001) (David Hoile, Farce Majeure: The Clinton Administration's Sudan Policy 1993–2000
- Islamic Law and Adoptions,
- The "Kutty" Islamic Law Flowchart
- The Myth and Reality of 'Shari'a' Courts in Canada: A Delayed Opportunity for the Indigenization of Islamic Legal Rulings. University of St. Thomas Law Journal, Vol. 7.
- 'Islamic Law' in U.S. Courts: Judicial Jihad or Constitutional Imperative? Pepperdine Law Review, Forthcoming; Valparaiso University Legal Studies Research Paper No. 14-8
