= Muhammad Robert Heft =

Canadian Muslim activist and writer (born 1972)

Muhammad Robert Heft (born November 4, 1972, in Winnipeg, Manitoba) is a Canadian Muslim activist.

== Biography ==
Coming from a German and Irish background, Heft spent his childhood and majority of his life in a small town outside of Toronto. Raised as a nominal Protestant Christian, Heft converted to Islam in 1998 after which he studied Islam with qualified scholars for over 7 years. He began his community involvement in 2003, and since then, has gone on to take part in a variety of government and community initiatives.

== Involvement ==
In 2007 Heft was made a representative for the Shaikh Mohammed bin Rashid Al Maktoum Humanitarian and Charity Est. for all of Canada, and he holds this position today.

In 2008 he started the Stop Terrorism cause, which is a global and online cause which claims to have 20,000 members.

In 2009 Heft formally started working with “youth at risk” and designed a 3-step "de-radicalization" program for Muslim Canadians. Through this program he has helped many youth who have turned towards radicalization and brought them away from that destructive state.

Judge Dawson court approved Heft in 2010 as a de-radicalization counsellor in for Steven Vikash Chand, one of the “Toronto 18” arrested for involvement in the 2006 Ontario terrorism plot.

Heft continues to support government agencies on efforts of de-radicalization and is also supported by former MPs of the federal government, Derek Lee and Dan McTeague.
