= Project Thread =

Project Thread was a Canadian police operation that resulted in the arrest of 24 immigrants in the Greater Toronto Area in 2003 amidst incorrect allegations they formed a threat to national security, and maintained "suspected ties to al-Qaeda". It was later determined that police had based their operation on "flimsy evidence and stereotypes".

After investigating an unregistered diploma mill, police had seized a copy of the names of the 400 students who had attended the school and arrested 24 of them, allegedly gathering the Muslim names off the list and finding dubious connections between them to report as a disrupted terrorist plot. Among the accusations, authorities alleged that the "al-Qaeda sleeper cell" had experimented with explosives, that one had taken flight training and others had been seen loitering around the Pickering power plant, and may have been targeting the CN Tower in Toronto. After criticism that the Muslim community in Canada had ignored the plight of the falsely accused men, 18 different men from the Greater Toronto Area were arrested three years later by Canadian authorities and charged with almost identical offences.

Eventually the government backed away from its initial alarms of terrorism, and re-labeled the case a simple charge of "immigration fraud". When they were eventually deported from the country, despite the admission they "faced the possibility of persecution", the men found themselves harassed and threatened by a country that now believed they were terrorists.

The men claimed that their lawyers and friends had been threatened and harassed by Canadian authorities. Critics claimed the arrests had been "trying to placate US security officials".

== Entry to Canada ==
The men were held at Maplehurst Correctional Complex. Each was also noted as having the name Muhammad in their full name.

All of the men had entered the country on student visas between January 1998 and September 5, 2001, and a number of them had cited Ottawa Business College (OBC) as their chosen institution. The former director of the school which had closed in 2001, Luther Samuel, admitted to selling C$700 registration letters to approximately 400 immigration applicants to improve their ability to apply for residence in Canada, and offering small amateurly produced courses across six rented classrooms. When the students expressed fears this was just a diploma mill taking thousands of dollars in tuition money from them, the director assured them they were just in a small branch of a larger downtown school. Those who left the school, realising that it was a scam, said they were afraid they would lose their immigration status if they reported the situation to police.

== Investigation ==
The investigation began when suspicions were raised about Khalid Jahinger, who left Lahore, Pakistan to travel to Nanaimo, British Columbia, on a student visa in December 1998. He moved to Ontario where he studied at OBC and George Brown College. He travelled to Mexico City to apply for permanent residency, which must be done from outside the country, where his C$40,000 bank account — inheritance from his recently deceased father — raised eyebrows and led to the beginning of the investigation. In May 2003, police stormed his apartment and arrested him and his roommate Aamir Nadeem and held them for five months until they volunteered to be deported to end their detention. Upon his return to Pakistan, Jahinger was questioned for eight full hours and released.

The remaining students at OBC were under investigation for months by the Royal Canadian Mounted Police and Immigration services.

== Arrests ==
The first 19 arrests, carried out by an anti-terrorism taskforce, occurred on August 14, 2003, targeting 18 men from Punjab, Pakistan and one from southern India.

For five days following the arrests, the men were held incommunicado and not allowed access to lawyers. It was ten days before Pakistani consular officials were notified about the arrests.

The men were initially asked to give Canadian interrogators the location of Osama bin Laden, despite the fact they protested that they had never had any contact with militants or been to Afghanistan. One was accused of having given money to Global Relief Foundation, a charity later blacklisted for supporting Islamic militancy. An apartment "linked to the men" was also alleged to have had a poster of airplane schematics on the wall, as well as a picture of guns, while another apartment had an "unexplained" fire in the kitchen leading to claims that it "could" have been from testing explosives.

Immigration official Stephanie Mackay stated that several of the men had travelled to the United States between May 2001 and January 2002, noting that the September 11th attacks occurred in that timeframe, leading the National Post to announce a possible link between the immigrants and the terrorist attack.

== Legal hearings ==
Aziz was the first of the men to be given a legal hearing, at which he was denied bail. The following day, Mohammad Akhtar was released on C$10,000 bail.

A number of the arrested men appeared "confused" at their bail hearings, and did not have legal representation. Some voluntarily offered to be deported.

Former Canadian Security Intelligence Service (CSIS) director Reid Morden was interviewed by the CBC, and stated that the arrests were legitimate, since the agency needs "only to suspect someone of being a threat before it can act".

== Aftermath ==
Once in Pakistan, a couple of deported people announced their intentions to sue the government of Canada for falsely accusing them of terrorism and ruining their lives. Canadian politician Diane Ablonczy argued that the arrests had made Canada less safe, since the embarrassment would leave law enforcement skittish in the future.
