= 1984 Montreal bombing =

Terrorist incident in Quebec, Canada

- The aftermath of the bombing
- Location: Montreal, Quebec, Canada
- Date: September 3, 1984; 10:22 am
- Target: Montreal Central Station
- Attack type: Bombing
- Weapon: Pipe bomb
- Deaths: 3
- Injuries: 70
- Motive: Unknown (likely anti-popery)
- Accused: Thomas Bernard Brigham

On September 3, 1984, a bomb was planted in Montreal Central Station in Montreal, Quebec, Canada, killing three French tourists and injuring 30–47 other people.

== Suspect ==
Thomas Bernard Clark Brigham (September 3, 1919 – February 14, 1993) was an American convicted of planting a bomb in Central Station in Montreal, Quebec, Canada on September 3, 1984, killing three French tourists and injuring 30–47 other people. He was widely believed to be protesting Pope John Paul II's impending visit to Canada later that week, although he said that he had nothing against the Pope because he was "going to be our ambassador against the Communists".

A native of Rochester, New York who had served as an Army Air Forces navigator who flew 24 missions during the Second World War, and claimed his bomber was shot down over Germany on April 29, 1944, leaving him in a prisoner of war camp with minor injuries.

His son Paul, a priest in St. Louis, later explained that his father became mentally disturbed but was not violent.

Brigham was committed to American mental institutions four times, having had delusions believing he was Jesus. He was also under surveillance by the Secret Service after it was determined that he was stalking President Ronald Reagan.

A divorced father of 11 children, Brigham lived in Ohio and Boston before moving to Montreal in April 1984, after spending a great amount of time in the city.

He was detained a year before the bombings by Constable Norman Veskels, who was suspicious to see him wandering the streets of Montreal in the middle of the night. He was released once it was determined he was not up to any trouble.

Brigham lived in the Princess Lodge rooming house four blocks from Central Station, and would spend his days drinking coffee and watching the trains pull into the station.

== Bombing ==
A week before the bombing, Via Rail police were called by a man speaking in broken French and told them to "be careful, it's going to blow". Via clerk Marc Belleville later testified that a subsequent search of the premises had been made, but turned up no evidence of suspicious material.

Three days before the bombing, Via Rail received an anonymous letter addressed to the "director" of "Cosmic Amtrak, Dorchester", warning of "the end of the Unholy Vatican", which warbled between disjointed French and English sentence fragments that spoke of impending violence. The back of the letter contained the names of Kathy Keefler, a local television journalist with the CBC, Clark Davey, the publisher of the Montreal Gazette and Kathy May, a reporter with the Ottawa Citizen. The Mentor, Ohio address of Brigham's daughter Kathy Brigham-Herten was also written in the note.

Two minutes before the bombing, Canadian National officers were alerted when a "young man with long blond hair who had been loitering in the station" ran across the station with his hands cupped over his ears "as if to shut out noise".

A pipebomb, consisting of gunpowder, dynamite and possibly gasoline, exploded in locker #132 at 10:22 am, killing three. Thirty others were wounded, including Robert Georges Duponte who separated his shoulder.

Witnesses later testified that someone shouted "Le pape est mort!" ("The Pope is dead!") just before the explosions, although Brigham did not speak French.

Urgences Sante Ambulance task force arrived four minutes after the bomb exploded led by Paramedic Supervisor Anthony Di Monte, and the first fatalities were confirmed at 10:45. Police initially reported the three deaths were of a man, woman and small girl; and speculated they may have been from the same family. The original assumption was that the bombing was related to an ongoing labour dispute amongst railway workers.

A telephone call to the station between 11:35 and 11:40 warned that a second bomb had been planted in the building, but police initially reported that no such device was found. A report released later that day said that a second device had been found in a locker near the one in which the first bomb was placed, and a third announcement at 4:45 pm again issued the story that no second bomb had been found.

Moments after the phone call, police arrested a man on Dorchester Boulevard who met the description of the one who had been seen prior to the bombing, but released him without charges. By noon, police knew of the letter that had been sent to Via, and had given a copy of the letter to reporters at the scene.

At 6:00 pm, the Île aux Tourtes Bridge to Montreal Island was shut down following a bomb hoax.

At 6:45 pm, Brigham was wearing glasses and a tweed jacket and cap when he found journalist Kathryn Leger outside the station and began speaking to her for twenty minutes. He assured her that he had nothing to do with the explosion, although he believed the station's clock pointed to 10:17 at the time of the blast, which he felt was a significant time for the papacy and began discussing numerology. He also told her that he had written threatening letters earlier, and felt premonitions something was going to happen in the station today. Leger excused herself from the conversation, and went inside the station to tell police, and a pair of homicide detectives took her to Montreal police station.

== Aftermath ==
Sûreté du Québec officers confronted Brigham the evening of the blast, accusing him of writing two threatening letters, the one sent to Amtrak, and another found in a local hotel room that included comments such as "Time Bomb Set For 10:30 Prox" and "Papacy ended with a bang Sept. 3". Brigham again acknowledged writing the letters, but continued to deny he had been involved with the bomb. He was brought into the Montreal police station, and at 11pm Leger identified him in a police lineup and he was held as a material witness, although he was not charged with any crime.

The day after the bombing, the Montreal bomb squad was called to Central Station after an anonymous bomb threat. Police found a styrofoam cooler and detonated it in a controlled explosion, but it simply contained food. They held and questioned a man in relation to the hoax, but let him go.

Another man was detained by CN officers the day after the explosion because he was wearing a Fatima sweatshirt, raising alarm as the word had been prominently used in Brigham's threatening letters.

Two days after the bombing, police announced that Brigham had been "ruled out", stating that "He didn't plant the bomb...we know that. We've checked it out." Police announced they were instead looking for "a bearded man in his late 20s or early 30s" who was seen immediately before the blast and believed to have befriended Brigham. They suggested that somebody who knew Brigham had written threatening letters and may have taken the opportunity to plant a bomb themselves. They also announced that fingerprinting had failed to identify the three corpses, but their passports indicated they were tourists from Paris, university students 25-year-old Marcelle Leblond and 24-year-old Michel Dubois, as well as 24-year-old artist Eric Nicolas. A fourth tourist who was travelling with the group, Joel Mary, was in stable condition at Royal Victoria Hospital.

Police announced they were going to release Brigham on September 12, ostensibly to wait for Coroner Maurice Lanielle to finish his inquest to determine the cause of death of the three French tourists, although there was acknowledgement there was an attempt to keep him in custody until the day the Pope ended his visit.

In November 1984, fellow prisoner Raymond Kircoff, a drug addict serving time for theft of a VCR, allegedly had discussions with Brigham about bomb construction while the two were being driven to court together from the detention facility. He subsequently stated that it was so simple "a 12-year old could do it", but during closing statements at Brigham's trial it was argued that the design of a bomb that Kirkcoff claimed Brigham had shown him was completely unlike the bomb used in the station. At his arraignment, Brigham pulled down his pants and stated that he was "not the bomb squad but the truth squad", and that there could be as many as 30 other bombings in the city, focusing on its strip clubs, and suggesting that "Montreal is going to be the sacrifice to the second coming".

In January 1985, the prosecution requested a hearing by sessions judge Claude Joncas into Brigham's mental competence to see if he was fit to stand trial, a move that was resisted by the defence who felt it unfairly villainized Brigham.

During the trial at the Quebec Superior Court, prosecutor Claude Parent called twenty witnesses, while attorney Pierre Poupart called nine including Brigham's ex-wife. During the course of the trial, the key to the locker was lost at the crime laboratory before it could be tested for fingerprints.

On April 19, the court took a bus to the station accompanied by Brigham, who quoted that it was "nice to be a star", referring to the rampant media attention. This statement was later dismissed by overseeing judge Kenneth Mackay.

Summations wrapped up on May 1, 1985, and a jury of six men and six women deliberated for nine hours on May 3 before retiring for the night, and then eight more hours the following day before returning a verdict of guilty on all three counts of first degree murder. In a statement after the verdict, Brigham spoke for 30 minutes referring to "cosmic forces" and stating that Our Lady of Fátima was due to appear in Montreal, and asking "If I were a bomber, would I have gone back to help people?"

Brigham was sentenced to life imprisonment at the Pinel Institute for the Criminally Insane with no parole for 25 years. In May 1985, shortly after his sentencing, it was announced that immigration officials were obtaining a deportation order that would be served in 2009 upon his release from prison.

A successful appeal in 1989 led to a new trial in front of Justice Charles Phelan after it was determined that Justice Kenneth MacKay had made four errors in his handling of the case. The verdict and sentencing of the second trial were identical, but led to another successful appeal request by attorney Jay Rumanek, arguing that an earlier defence attorney, Michael Kastner, had committed errors after learning Brigham could not testify to the jury.

Brigham died of a heart attack in 1993, at the age of 73, only days after consultations with his attorney. His death between trials meant that due to presumption of innocence until conviction, he would be presumed innocent.
