= Returnees from Albania =

1999 Egyptian criminal trial

The case of the Returnees from Albania was a massive criminal trial in an Egyptian military court from February to April 1999. The trial is one of the principal sources of information about Sunni terrorist groups in the 1990s, especially al-Gama'a al-Islamiyya and its offshoot Egyptian Islamic Jihad.

The largest trial in Egypt since the 1981 trials surrounding the assassination of President Anwar Sadat, it was a landmark case in the topics of extraordinary rendition and the credibility of the testimony of terrorism detainees.

The local Egyptian press coined the phrase "Returnees from Albania" to describe the defendants, in reference to the American-backed extraordinary rendition which saw suspects kidnapped from foreign locations and secretly brought back to Egypt to face trial. In actuality, 43 men were brought from Albania, Kuwait, Saudi Arabia, and Yemen and an additional 64 were tried in absentia.

The prosecution leaned heavily on the testimony of defendant Ahmad Ibrahim al-Sayyid al-Naggar, who was the first arrested.

== Documentation and terminology ==
The documents speak of "the Muslim group" or "the Muslim organization", meaning al-Gama'a al-Islamiyya as it was at that time. Most of al-Gama'a later renounced violence, but a violent residue called Islamic Jihad remained; that group was later known as Egyptian Islamic Jihad (EIJ) to distinguish it from Palestinian Islamic Jihad. The remnants of EIJ and at least one person in the violent fugitive component of Gama'a (namely Mohammad Hasan Khalil al-Hakim) have since merged with al-Qaeda.

Reportage of events in the early 1990s mentions one more group, or rather one more name for some of the same people: Vanguards of Conquest. That was the faction of EIJ that was led by al-Zawahiri after the capture and sentencing of 'Abbud al-Zumar, the first emir of EIJ.

== The charges ==
Broadly, the aim of al-Gama'a al-Islamiyya was to bring about the destruction of the Egyptian government, followed by its replacement with a sharia-based Islamist regime. To get there, the plan was to kill and intimidate government members, destroy the Egyptian tourism industry, and create fear and distrust in the Egyptian population. In more detail, the trial addressed

- several bombings of banks
- the 1990 assassination of the chairman of the Egyptian parliament Dr. Rif'at al-Mahjub
- the 1993 assassination attempt of Interior Minister Abdul Halim Moussa, which killed four others
- the 1993 assassination attempt against Prime Minister Atef Sedki, in which a child was killed
- the 1994 assassination of Major General Ra'uf Khayrat (assistant director of the SSIS) in Cairo
- the 1995 assassination of Egyptian attaché Ahmed Alaa Nazmi in Switzerland
- the 1995 assassination attempt against President Hosni Mubarak in Addis Ababa (26 June; EIJ claim responsibility)
- the 1995 bombing of Egypt's embassy in Pakistan, killing 15 people; an intended simultaneous mass murder of tourists at Khan al-Khalili did not materialize.
- the 1997 massacre of tourists at Luxor

== The accused ==
Twenty were acquitted, nine sentenced to death (all in absentia), 11 to life imprisonment, and 67 were given sentences up to 25 years.

The trial concluded that the "constituent assembly" of al-Gama'a contained these fifteen names.

| Ayman al-Zawahiri | Emir | In Absentia | Sentenced to death; died in Afghanistan in 2022. |
| Sa'id Imam bin Abdulaziz ash-Sharif, alias Dr. Fadl, alias Abdul-Qadr bin Abdulaziz سيد إمام بن عبد العزيز الشريف | Religious expert | Captured in Yemen 2001, extradited to Egypt 2004 | Sentenced to (and serving) life |
| Abdullah Muhammad Rajab Abdul-Rahman alias Ahmad Hasan Abu al-Khayr احمد حسن ابو الخير | Special Actions Committee | | |
| Tariq Anwar Said Ahmed طارق انور سيد احمد | Special Actions Committee | | |
| Almakni Mukhta المكنى مختار | Special Actions Committee | | |
| Muhammad al-Zawahiri محمد الظواهري (brother of Ayman al-Zawahiri) | Shura, Military Committee | Extradited by the UAE early in 1999 | Under a death sentence; probably still alive in April 2007 |
| Ahmed Salamah Mabruk alias Abu al-Faraj al-Masri احمد سلامه مبروك | Shura, Operations boss, Special Actions Committee | Snatched in Baku in 1998, along with his computer, and rendered to Egypt | |
| Thirwat Salah Shahata ثروت صلاح شحاته | Shura, Security outside Egypt | Fled to Afghanistan or Pakistan | Sentenced to death for a second time |
| Murjan (or Murgan) Salim مرجان سالم | Shura, Legal services | At large somewhere | Under a death sentence; was demoted in Gama'a after several of his plots failed. |
| Adel Abdul-Quddus عادل عبد القدوس | Families' services, travel facilitation | Free in Austria | Sentenced to death and was already under a death sentence for the attempt against Sedki |
| Ibrahim Eidarous ابراهيم عيداروس | Finance (?) (see also Advice and Reform Committee) | Held in the UK until his death from natural causes in 2008; was wanted in the USA | Sentenced to life |
| Adel Abdel Bary عادل عبد المجيد عبد الباري | Information Committee (see also Advice and Reform Committee) | Held in the UK; wanted in the USA | Sentenced to death; was already under a death sentence from 1995 |
| Hani Muhammad al-Said al-Siba'i هاني محمد السيد السياعي | Media publicity boss | Free in the UK and still operating | Sentenced to 15 years |
| Mahmoud Hisham Muhammad Mustafa al-Hanawi محمود هشام محمد مصطفى الحناوي | | Convicted in absentia, killed in 2005 in Chechnya) | 10 years' imprisonment |
| Nasr Fahmi Nasr Hassanein نصر فهمي نصر حسنين | Shura, Finance boss | At large; also wanted in the USA | Sentenced to death |
| Ahmed Bassiouni Ahmed Dewidar احمد بسيوني احمد دويدار alias Abu Ismail | Security within Egypt | Killed in Yemen July 2005 | Sentenced to 25 years |

== Arrested and charged ==
The returnees themselves were around 14 in number. About 12 were snatched in Albania, one in Sofia, and one in Baku. One other was killed during the Tirana roundup, which arrested four and occurred in July 1998. The returnees include:

| Husam Muhammad Khamis Nuwayr aka Adil Anwar | pleaded not guilty to overseeing the Feb. 7 1994 bombing of the Egyptian National Bank, the Feb. 15 bombing of the Alexandria-Kuwait Bank, the Feb. 23 bombing of the International Commercial Bank in al-Muhandisin, the attack on the Egyptian-American Bank in al-Muhandisin, the attack on the Mustafa Kamil Branch of Misr Bank and the attack on the Nile Office Tower in al-Jizah. | | |
| Ahmad 'Abd-al-Fattah Sayyid | Was part of the Feb. 7 1994 bombing of the Egyptian National Bank | | |
| Hasan Salih Mahmud | Was part of the Feb. 15 1994 bombing of the Alexandria-Kuwait Bank | | |
| Shawqi Salama Mustafa Atiya شوقي سلامة مصطفى عطيه | Ran the Tirana office. Egypt issued an arrest warrant for Atiya, and his five colleagues in Tirana, only on the advice of the United States. Atiya claimed he was hanged from his limbs, kept in a cell filled with water to his knees, and suffered electrical shocks to his testicles. | | |
| Ahmad Ibrahim al-Sayyid al-Naggar احمد ابراهيم السيد النجار | Arrested in Tirana under death sentence from October 1997 following 1994 plot to bomb the Khan el-Khalili market in Cairo. | | |
| Muhammad Hassan Mahmud Tita | Tirana | | |
| Ahmad Isma'il 'Uthman | Tirana; was under a death sentence from March 1994 | | |
| 'Issam Abdul-Tawab Abdul-'Alim | Sofia | | |
| Ahmed Salama Mabruk احمد سلامه مبروك | Baku | | |
| Ahmed Refa'i Taha أحمد رفاعي طه | Former Emir of Gama'a | Held by Egypt since 2001 and probably still alive | Sentenced to death |
| Mohammad Zeki Mahjoub محمد زكي محجوب | Alleged to be (though no evidence has ever been produced in Canada or Egypt) special Actions Committee, and a terrorist trainer | Never charged in Canada, has been fighting immigration "security certificate" since June 2000 in Canada, currently under house arrest pending outcome of his case | Sentenced to 15 years in absentia |
| Yassir al-Sirri ياسر السري | | Has safe haven in the UK; wanted in the USA in the case against Lynne Stewart and others | Sentenced to death; was already under a death sentence for his part in the attempt against Sedki, in which a random child was killed |
| Magdi Ibrahim al-Sayyid al-Naggar مجدي ابراهيم السيد النجار | | Brother of Ahmad al-Naggar | Acquitted in absentia |
| Abdel-Akher Hammad عبد الآخر حماد | A cleric | Now free in Egypt | Sentenced to death but recanted |
| El-Sayed Abdel-Maqsud السيد عبد المقصود | Headed the Tirana office | Escaped the roundup in Albania and reached the UK, where he got political asylum | Sentenced to 10 years |
| Muhammad al-Islambouli محمد الإسلامبولي | (brother of assassin Khalid al-Islambouli) | Said to be now in al-Qaeda; see al-Hukaymah | Sentenced to death |
| Khalid Abdullah | (former husband of Zaynab Khadr) | Involved in 1996 Attack on the Egyptian Embassy in Pakistan | Sentenced to prison |
| Mohammed Atef | | Charged in absentia, sentenced to seven years' imprisonment | |
| Isam Muhammad Khalil; Ahmad Bakr | | Charged in absentia, sentenced to five years' imprisonment. Extradited by Yemen in 2007, while his wife was deported. | |

== Funding and travel ==
Ahmad al-Naggar's controversial confession says that the money involved was not great and that it basically "came from Usama bin Ladin". But how exactly the agents in Albania got hold of money is not so simple. It seems probable that one or more Sunni terrorist charities were involved; both al-Haramain Foundation and Global Relief Foundation had branches in Tirana, and a third charity front, Benevolence International Foundation, had an office in Baku. (Al-Naggar himself held a low-paid job in Tirana as a teacher of Arabic for the Revival of Islamic Heritage Society, but that group was not accused nor incriminated in any way in the Returnees affair. On the contrary, al-Naggar was expected to get a job in Albania and give 10% of his wages to the terrorist group of which he himself was a member.)
