= Ihab Saqr =

A member of the Vanguards of Conquest, Ihab Abdallah Saqr (Arabic: إيهاب صقر, alternatively Ihab Muhammad Saqr) was believed to have coordinated the bombing of the Egyptian embassy in Islamabad and was a high-priority target for the CIA when he was captured in Baku, Azerbaijan. He was one of 14 people subjected to extraordinary rendition by the CIA prior to the 2001 declaration of a war on terror.

According to Saqr's attorney, it has never been proven that he is related to the Egyptian embassy bombing and was never accused as such by Egyptian authorities.

== Arrest ==
In August, three weeks after the 1998 United States embassy bombings, a wiretapped phone call tipped off the Israeli Mossad that a rendez-vous between Saqr and an Iranian MOIS official was planned in Baku, Azerbaijan. Other sources dismiss the existence of any Iranian officials and limits the telephone call to communication between Ihab and Essam while coordinating a meeting point. Without a bureau in Azerbaijan, they contacted the American CIA, who allowed a Canadian-raised Mossad agent to unofficially tag along as seven or eight CIA officers based in Frankfurt oversaw a local police raid on the Baku hotel room on August 20.

When the Azeri police received confirmation that Saqr was in his hotel room drinking coffee with others, they stormed the room grabbing all three people they found present and brought them still barefoot to the police station.

But according to Ihab Sakr's attorney Abdel-Moneim Abdel-Maksoud story At 9:30 a.m 20 August 1998 Ihab Sakr and Essam Marzouk left their room on the seventh floor of Azerbaijan Hotel in Baku and passed by a group of hotel guests who were later found to be C.I.A agents. As both stood by the elevator they were overpowered by a group of American and Azeri secret agents, who transferred them to a security complex on the outskirts of Baku where they were interrogated by an interrogator fluent in Arabic. The same night they were transferred to Baku airport from where they were transferred by an Egyptian military aircraft to Egypt where they were received by Egyptian intelligence. Both of them were interred by Egyptian intelligence for sixth month then were transferred to the headquarters for Egyptian state security police in Lazoghli Square on 16/2/1999 where he stayed for seventy days then was transferred to Alaqrab prison on the day of 25/4/1999 then to Istikbal Tora Prison on 13/10/2002 then to Liman Tora on 6/12/2006 until 1/7/2008 when he was returned to istikbal prison and remains there. It was now realised that the Iranian official hadn't yet shown up, and they had instead arrested Saqr, as well as Ahmad Salama Mabruk and Essam Marzouk. They were brought to the police station, where the Mossad agent says the police "beat the crap out of them".

As to Ahmad Salama Mabruk he has never met Ihab or Essam in Baku, but authorities knew of his existence there from a phone number found two month before with the arrested Albania cell which led to his surveillance, arrest and subsequent deportation to Egypt two weeks after the detention and deportation of Essam and Ihab.

Saqr was handed over to Egypt in September, but wasn't tried in the Returnees from Albania trial like the other two; but was instead represented by attorney Abdel-Moneim Abdel-Maksoud in his own trial, who unsuccessfully filed a motion for his release since his name had never been mentioned in any of the military or civil trials concerning the alleged acts of terrorism, nor had he been accused in any of the other prisoners' confessions. In July 1999, he was one of 71 alleged militants connected to the embassy bombing who saw their cases transferred to a military court.
