= Ahmad Ibrahim al-Sayyid al-Naggar =

Egyptian mujahid (died 2000)

- Born: 1963; United Arab Republic
- Died: February 23, 2000 (aged 36–37) al-Isti'naf prison, Egypt
- Cause of death: Execution by hanging
- Other names: Abdel Raheem Mohammed Hussein; Ahmed Rajab Mohammed
- Military career
- Organization: Egyptian Islamic Jihad
- Service years: 1970s–1998
- Nickname: Propaganda chief
- Known for: One of 14 people subjected to CIA extraordinary rendition prior to 2001
- Other work: Teacher

Ahmad Ibrahim al-Sayyid al-Naggar was a member of the Egyptian Islamic Jihad, an Islamist terrorist group active since the 1970s. The ADL dubbed him the "propaganda chief" of the militant organisation. He was one of 14 people subjected to extraordinary rendition by the CIA prior to the 2001 declaration of a war on terror.

== Life ==
It is very clear that the Islamic Jihad supports the Taliban wholeheartedly.

— al-Nagger

His permanent address was on al-Shaikh al-Husari street in Giza. In 1991, he was sentenced in absentia to three years imprisonment in the al-Jihad case arising from the assassination of Anwar Sadat. However, he fled the country in 1993 when Adil al-Sudani got him a false passport in the name of Abdel Raheem Mohammed Hussein and bought him an October 18 ferry ticket from Nuwaiba to Jordan, and told him to wait for a phone call at the Jordan River Hotel in Amman. When he arrived the next day, he received a call from Mahmud al-Deeb who told him to book a flight four days later to Sanaa, Yemen to meet with him. When al-Naggar arrived, he was greeted by Ayman al-Zawahiri and his brother Muhammad al-Zawahiri, Ahmad Salamah Mabruk, and Thirwat Shehata, who assured him that al-Jihad took care of its own, and they were glad to see him safe.

In 1994, he was asked to travel to Sudan, and was subsequently met by al-Zawahiri, who asked him to oversee civil organisation of al-Jihad.

In October of the following year, Zawahiri asked him to instead travel to Yemen to oversee civil operations there; but three months later was told to travel with his fake passport in the name of Ahmed Rajab Mohammed, to take a job as a teacher with the Haramain charity in Tirana, Albania. He also led the Centre for Islamic Heritage.

Following the 1996 rise of the Taliban government in Afghanistan, al-Naggar tried to link al-Jihad to the new government, noting their shared ideals.

== Capture, trials, execution ==
Osama wanted to launch a guerrilla war not only in the Arab and Islamic world, but in the whole world ... he believed these attacks would force America and its allies to change their policy in the Middle East and the Islamic world

— al-Naggar, during trial

He was sentenced to death in absentia in an Egyptian military court on October 15, 1997, for the crime of membership in al-Jihad, and possession of weapons. He was ostensibly linked to the 1995 plot to blow up the Khan el-Khalili market, as well as the assassination of Speaker of Parliament Rifaat el-Mahgoub in October 1990. The trial was condemned as "unfair" by Amnesty International.

In 1998, Adel Abdel Bari asked al-Naggar to claim asylum in the United Kingdom, so he could help convince Hani Sibai to support the Algerian GIA in media communiques.

He was arrested on July 2, 1998, as he stepped off the plane in Cairo, having been deported from Albania with the help of the CIA. His wife was also arrested.

He was tried in the 1999 Returnees from Albania trial at which he was defended by Montasser el-Zayat. He was tortured for nine months; locked in a room with water up to his knees 24 hours a day. When taken to SSI headquarters in Lazughli Square and questioned by Captain Yasir Azzulddin, his hands and feet were tied, as interrogators applied electric shocks to his nipples and penis. Under torture, al-Naggar admitted that al-Jihad had acquired anthrax from an unnamed East Asian country for $3,695. He later claimed his confessions were only a result of this torture. He was sentenced to 25 years' imprisonment. In November, he was transferred to Tora Prison, where Amnesty noted he was at less risk of torture or sudden execution.

Together with the other three returnees brought from Tirana, his capture and torture were listed as the main reasons for the 1998 United States embassy bombings.

He was hanged on February 23, 2000, at al-Isti'naf prison, due to the earlier death sentence levied against him.
