= Adel Abdel Bari =

Egyptian terrorist

- Born: Adel Mohammed Abdel Magid Abdel Bari; 24 June 1960 (age 66)
- Children: Abdel-Majed Abdel Bary
- Status: Released
- Convictions: Conspiracy to commit the murders of United States nationals abroad (18 U.S.C. §§ 371 and 2332); Threatening to use an explosive (18 U.S.C. § 844); Conspiracy to make a threat to use an explosive (18 U.S.C. § 844)
- Penalty: 25 years imprisonment (released after serving just over 5 years)

Adel Mohammed Abdel Magid Abdel Bari (Arabic: عادل محمد عبد المجيد عبد الباري; born 24 June 1960) is an Egyptian terrorist.

He was, together with fellow Egyptian citizen Ibrahim Hussein Abdel Hadi Eidarous until the latter's death, in custody in the United Kingdom from 1999, fighting extradition to the United States, where they were wanted in connection with the 1998 United States embassy bombings in East Africa. Both men were extradited to the United States in October 2012. He pleaded guilty in 2014 and was sentenced to 25 years in prison but was released after only 5 years due to time served and medical grounds, and then repatriated to the UK.

His son, Abdel-Majed Abdel Bary, was radicalised and joined ISIS.

== Biography ==
Bari came to the attention of Egyptian authorities as early as 1981, when he was imprisoned and tortured following the murder of President Anwar Sadat on 6 October of that year.

On a return trip from the United States to Egypt via the UK in 1991, Abdel Bari applied for political asylum in Britain. It was granted by the Second Major ministry in 1993. He used his contacts at Amnesty International, which he obtained by virtue of his torture in the Sadat affair, to gain support for his causes in London. While at large in London he worked for al-Qaeda's Advice and Reform Committee under al-Fawwaz and alongside Eidarous; his indictment says he leased a premises on Beethoven Street, just off London's Kilburn Lane, that was transformed into Osama bin Laden's "media information office", which he named the "International Office for the Defence of the Egyptian People". During this time, the family frequented the Regent's Park mosque.

Bari contacted Mahmoud Jaballah to mention he was shipping him several books and periodicals, including al-Mujahideen and al-Faqr for distribution in Canada, and copies of the Shifaa and some audiocassettes he asked him to forward on to Thirwat Shehata.

Bari was sentenced to death in absentia in Egypt in 1995 for his part in the 1995 plot to blow up Cairo's Khan el-Khalili market, along with Ahmad Ibrahim al-Sayyid al-Naggar and Ahmad Salama Mabruk.

Bari was, in 1997 and 1998, reputedly the head of the London-based terrorist cell for the EIJ.

In 1998, Bari advised Naggar to request asylum in the UK, so Naggar could help convince Hani Sibai to support the Algerian GIA in media communiques.

He was arrested in September 1998 in the UK as part of Operation Challenge, which arrested seven men living in Britain through use of the Prevention of Terrorism (Temporary Provisions) Act 1989, accusing them of links to al-Jihad, because of the Embassy bombings in East Africa. Bari spent on that occasion roughly 10 days in confinement. The British police found there was no terrorism case to charge Abdul Bary with. He was charged with possession of gas canisters, bailed, and then acquitted in a jury trial. An official letter from the anti-terrorism police at the time stated that after nine months of exhaustive investigation, they found that he and the other Egyptian men arrested with him had no connection with al-Qaida, nor any connection with terrorism in Britain.

According to an article in The Guardian, a 1999 extradition request by the US was the result of evidence that "had been sent by the UK to the US as part of the great fishing net of shared intelligence in the war on terror. His lawyers began to fight the extradition in a process that soon took on the character of Dickens's Jarndyce v Jarndyce in Bleak House."

Between 2002 and 2008, successive UK secretaries of state in the Blair ministry spent six years coming to a decision to extradite him. Representations for judicial reviews and appeals were made by his lawyers, including several medical reports, which over the years warned of his serious depression and risk of suicide in prison. During this time, his family always "felt hostility towards them – for being foreign and the stigma of visiting a Category-A prisoner."

According to the U.S. indictment, Abdel Bari communicated by satellite phone with Ayman al-Zawahiri, Zawahiri invited Abdel Bari into the British component of Egyptian Islamic Jihad (EIJ), and Abdel Bari accepted, promising to obey the EIJ leadership. Abdel Bari and Eidarous are also accused of issuing statements to several press organizations shortly after the embassy bombings, in which they claim to represent the perpetrators. He received an additional life sentence in absentia in the 1999 case of the Returnees from Albania, in which he was convicted of being a media agent of EIJ and the head of EIJ's London component.

His final appeal against extradition to the European Court of Human Rights was refused in autumn 2012. and on 5 October 2012 the United States extradited Bari from the UK to New York to face charges including "murder, conspiracy to use weapons of mass destruction".

He was ultimately charged with 213 counts of premeditated murder for the Nairobi bombing and 11 more for the attack in Dar es Salaam, as well as conspiracy to use weapons of mass destruction and several lesser charges.

These attacks left more than 5,000 others wounded. Said the indictment: the "media office" in London (see above) was also set up "to provide a cover for activity in support of al Qaeda's "military" activities, including the recruitment of military trainees, the disbursement of funds and the procurement of necessary equipment (including satellite telephones) and necessary services. In addition, the London office served as a conduit for messages, including reports on military and security matters from various al Qaeda cells, including the Kenyan cell, to al Qaeda's headquarters. Bari made efforts to facilitate the delivery of fake travel documents to co-conspirators who were members or associates of Egyptian Islamic Jihad in Holland and Albania."

On 19 September 2014, Bari pleaded guilty to three counts of the indictment before federal Judge Lewis A. Kaplan. Charges to which he pleaded guilty were cited as including conspiring to kill U.S. nationals, conspiring to make a threat to kill, injure, intimidate, and damage and destroy property by means of an explosive, and making such a threat. According to the indictment, Bari transmitted, via international telephone calls to the media, the contents of al Qaeda's claims of responsibility for the 7 August 1998, bombings of the United States Embassies in Nairobi, Kenya, and Dar es Salaam, Tanzania, which killed 224 people. The next day, he transmitted threats of future attacks by the same terrorists, to media organizations in France, Qatar and the United Arab Emirates. Bary additionally arranged for messages to be transmitted to and from members of the media to his co-conspirators, including Osama bin Laden and his successor Ayman al-Zawahiri. Judge Kaplan did not immediately accept the plea deal and gave the lawyers for the government and Bari one week to submit letters why he should accept the plea deal. A prosecutor said Bari engaged in no overt acts which resulted in the murders themselves. Two co-defendants, Khalid al Fawwaz and Abu Anas al Libi, were scheduled to commence trial on 3 November 2014 before Judge Kaplan.

On 6 February 2015, Bari was sentenced to 25 years in prison as a result of a plea bargain. Bari was released on 9 October 2020. He later returned to live in London.

== Personal life ==
Adel Abdel Bari and his wife Ragaa, a British citizen since 2009, had six children together including British rapper Abdel-Majed Abdel Bary (1991–2023), who, in August 2014, was described as a "key suspect" in the hunt for Jihadi John, an Islamic State of Iraq and the Levant (also known as ISIL or ISIS) member of a cell known as The Beatles. Bari's son was later found dead on 26 July 2023 in a prison cell, where he had been imprisoned pending the verdict in a trial.

Bari arranged from prison the marriage of the eldest daughter to a cousin of hers. He is a grandfather to babies that were born during his UK prison stay.
