= Saeed Salama =

Saeed Sayyed Salama (سعيد سيد سلامة) was arrested in June 1998, accused of membership in al-Jihad, as he was crossing into Egypt from Yemen. Other sources say he was arrested June 1, 1998 in Saudi Arabia.

He was accused of overseeing several bomb attacks against American military targets within Saudi Arabia.

At the Returnees from Albania case, he reported that the militant group had decided to shift their focus to attacking American and French targets after those two countries began helping apprehend and kill Islamic militants, and that targets were chosen to give the group a media platform and secure their "power and credibility".
