= Mahmud Hisham al-Hennawi =

Mahmud Hisham al-Hennawi (محمود هشام محمد مصطفى الحناوي), also known by his kunya Abu Sahl, was an Islamic militant with ties to the Egyptian Islamic Jihad and later Al-Qaeda. He was killed in Chechnya in 2005.

== Early life ==
His older brother Ahmed Hani al-Hennawi was arrested in 1974 as a founding member of EIJ. Around 1980, al-Hennawi was arrested along with another brother named Hisham, again accused of complicity in the al-Jihad group.

In 1984, al-Hennawi moved to Jeddah, where he became a well-respected Saudi merchant. He later left to fight in the jihad against the Soviet invasion of Afghanistan, but upon returning to Saudi Arabia in 1993, was sought by authorities and so fled to Yemen, while Saudi security authorities deported his wife and children to Egypt.

He moved to the Sudan, but after an incident involving the sons of Ahmad Salama Mabruk and Mohammed Sharaf, was among the Arabs ordered to leave the country by the government so traveled to China where he again began working as a merchant until he felt Chinese authorities were seeking him, and so moved to Azerbaijan.

== Arrest and imprisonment in Russia ==
On December 1, 1996, al-Hennawi and Ahmad Salama Mabruk - both carrying false passports - accompanied Ayman al-Zawahiri on a trip to Chechnya, where they hoped to re-establish the faltering al-Jihad. Their leader was traveling under the name Abdullah Imam Mohammed Amin, and trading on his medical credentials for legitimacy. The group switched vehicles three times, but were arrested within hours of entering Russian territory and spent five months in a Makhachkala prison awaiting trial. The trio pleaded innocence, maintaining their disguise and having other al-Jihad members from Bavari-C send the Russian authorities pleas for leniency for their "merchant" colleagues who had been wrongly arrested; and Russian Member of Parliament Nadyr Khachiliev echoed the pleas for their speedy release as al-Jihad members Ibrahim Eidarous and Tharwat Salah Shehata traveled to Dagestan to plead for their release. Shehata received permission to visit the prisoners, and is believed to have smuggled them $3000 which was later confiscated from their cell, and to have given them a letter which the Russians didn't bother to translate.

In April 1997, they were sentenced to six months, and were subsequently released a month later and ran off without paying their court-appointed attorney Abulkhalik Abdusalamov his $1,800 legal fee citing their "poverty". Shehata was sent on to Chechnya, where he met with Ibn Khattab. Zawahiri and Mabruk accompanied al-Hennawi to Baku, Azerbaijan where he'd managed to secure himself a position.

== Returnees from Albania ==
He was convicted in absentia during the 1998 Returnees from Albania trial in Egypt, and sentenced to ten years' imprisonment.

== Death and imprisonment of son ==
In early 2005, he was reported killed at the age of 50, fighting in Chechnya.

His son Hamza was subsequently arrested by Egyptian authorities.
