= Muhammad Abd al-Salam Faraj =

Egyptian Islamist

- محمد عبد السلام فرج
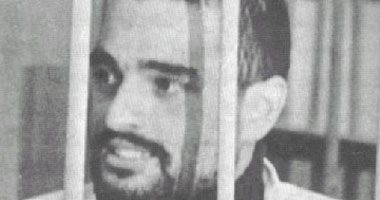
- Born: 1952; El Delengat, Beheira, Kingdom of Egypt
- Died: April 15, 1982 (aged between 29 and 30); Cairo, Egypt
- Cause of death: Execution by hanging
- Education: Cairo University
- Known for: Leader of Tanzim al-Jihad

Muhammad Abd al-Salam Faraj (Arabic: محمد عبد السلام فرج, Egyptian Arabic: [mæˈħæm.mæd ʕæb.des.sæˈlæːm ˈfɑɾaɡ]; 1952 – 15 April 1982) was an Egyptian radical Islamist, convicted murderer by proxy, and theorist. He led the Cairo branch of the Islamist group al-Jihad (also Tanzim al-Jihad) and made a significant contribution in elevating the role of jihad in radical Islam with his pamphlet The Neglected Obligation (also The Neglected Duty). He was executed in 1982 for his role in coordinating the assassination of Egyptian president Anwar Sadat the previous year.

== Life ==
Muhammad Abd al-Salam Faraj was born in the El Delengat neighborhood of the Beheira Governorate in 1952. His father was a member of the radical wing of the Muslim Brotherhood in Egypt. Faraj graduated in electrical engineering and worked as an administrator in Cairo University. Faraj began to develop the revolutionary group that would become al-Jihad in 1979. Faraj, an engaging speaker, recruited individuals who heard him preach jihad in mosques. Over the next two years these individuals recruited others and in this way Faraj came to be the overall leader of a loose group of around five revolutionary cells. These cells, one of which was led by Ayman al-Zawahiri retained a degree of independence but met regularly and had a joint strategy.

In late September 1981 Faraj held a meeting with other al-Jihad leaders to discuss a plot to assassinate Anwar Sadat. The idea had been proposed to him by Khalid Islambouli, a lieutenant in the Egyptian Army whom Faraj had invited to join al-Jihad when he was posted to Cairo six months before. Islambouli had learned that he was to be involved in a celebratory parade involving the President and saw an opportunity. Despite disagreements among the leaders, the plan went ahead. Sadat was killed on 6 October. Faraj was quickly arrested and was executed on 15 April 1982, along with Islambouli and three accomplices.

== Ideas ==
Mainstream Salafism argues that Muslims should aim to emulate the practices of Muhammad and his companions and believe that the failure to do so is responsible for the problems facing the Islamic World. Criticising Salafis, Faraj argued that modern Muslims had specifically neglected jihad, which he placed after the five pillars as the most important aspect of Islam.

Faraj also had very specific views on what form this jihad should take. He followed Sayyid Qutb in arguing that jihad was a fard al-ayn (an individual duty incumbent upon every Muslim). He dismissed the notion that inner spiritual struggle was the greater jihad as a fabricated tradition, and emphasised the role of armed combat.

The primary targets for jihad should be local regimes, Faraj taught. He coined the term "near enemy" to describe such targets, in contrast to "far enemies" such as Israel. He built on Qutb's idea that modern Islamic societies represented jahiliyyah (the state of ignorance that pervaded in the pre-Islamic Arab world) and used the ideas of ibn Taymiyyah to blame this on modern "apostate" Islamic rulers.

He believed that peaceful means could never bring about a truly Islamic society and so jihad was the only option. He also believed that an Islamic state should be established in Egypt before attempting to reliberate lost Muslim lands. He felt jihad under the banner of an existing Arab nation would simply strengthen that country's impious rulers who were, in any case, responsible for the colonial presence in Muslim lands.

=== The Neglected Duty ===
After the assassination of President Sadat the Egyptian police found a document titled Al-Farida al-gha'iba (The Neglected Duty), penned by Abd al-Salam Faraj, which was published serially after its discovery. The work showed the evolution of radical Islamist ideas since Qutb's Islamist manifesto Milestones. While Qutb felt that jihad was a proclamation of "liberation for humanity", Faraj maintained with absolute certainty that jihad would enable Muslims to rule the world and to reestablish the caliphate.

On the importance of fighting the near enemy before the far enemy:

Muslim blood will be shed in order to realize this victory [over Israel]. Now it must be asked whether this victory will benefit the interest of Infidel rule? It will mean the strengthening of a state which rebels against the Laws of God [the shari'ah] ... These rulers will take advantage of the nationalist ideas of these Muslims in order to realize their un-Islamic aims, even though at the surface [these aims] look Islamic. Fighting has to be done [only] under the Banner of Islam and under Islamic leadership.

Faraj believed it was the Muslim's responsibility to fight, but that ultimately, (based on Qur'an 9:14) supernatural divine intervention would provide the victory:

This means that a Muslim has first of all the duty to execute the command to fight with his own hands. [Once he has done so] God will then intervene [and change] the laws of nature. In this way victory will be achieved through the hands of the believers by means of God's [intervention].

Much of the rest of The Neglected Duty is taken up with discussions concerning Islamically legitimate methods of fighting. Among these are deceiving the enemy, lying to him, attacking by night (even if it leads to accidentally killing innocents), and felling and burning trees of the infidel.

=== Motivation for killing Sadat ===
After killing Sadat, his assassin (a member of al-Jihad) announced: 'I have killed Pharaoh! I am not afraid to die.' This surprised some in the Western world who assumed that "Sadat's offense in the eyes of the murderers was making peace with Israel" and would be called a Jewish agent or something similar, rather than a Pharaoh. But Abd al-Salam Faraj explained at his trial that he and his group were interested in instituting Shariah law, not fighting Zionism or imperialism:

The basis of the existence of imperialism in the lands of Islam is these self-same rulers. To begin with the struggle against imperialism is a work which is neither glorious nor useful, and it is only a waste of time. It is our duty to concentrate on our Islamic cause, and that is the establishment first of all of God's law in our own country and causing the world of God to prevail. There is no doubt that the first battlefield of the jihad is the extirpation of these infidel leaderships and their replacement by a perfect Islamic order, and from this will come the release of our energies.

The specific reason Sadat had to be killed according to The Neglected Duty, was that his government (along with all Muslim majority country governments) did not rule according to sharia. Faraj cited as justification the fatwa of Ibn Taymiyyah (which had takfiring Mongols for not ruling by sharia) -- "combat ... those that place themselves outside the sharia"; And also verse 5:44 of the Quran: “And whoever did not judge (yahkum) by what Allah revealed, those are the unbelievers” (later copied by Osama bin Laden).

== Influence ==
Faraj failed in the near term. He did not have a sufficiently robust network and could not capitalise on the assassination of Sadat. In conjunction with the assassination, Tanzim al-Jihad began an insurrection in Asyut in Upper Egypt. Rebels took control of the city for a few days starting 8 October 1981, before paratroopers from Cairo restored government control. 68 policemen and soldiers were killed in the fighting.

Nevertheless, Faraj's pamphlet The neglected obligation was a highly influential text. Faraj probably wrote his ideas down in 1979, although it was initially only distributed among his followers. The ideas contained in it guided Egyptian Islamist extremist groups throughout the 1980s and 90s. Ayman al-Zawahiri was Faraj's friend and followed his mantra of targeting the near enemy for many years.

Some writers have criticised Faraj. Jad al-Haq of the al-Azhar University dismissed his declaration of Sadat as an apostate and had misinterpreted parts of the Qur'an, including the sword verse. Others have questioned Faraj's religious credentials, pointing out that he trained as an electrician rather than as an Islamic jurist.

== See also ==
- Hassan al-Banna
- Muhammad al-Zawahiri
- Shukri Mustafa
- Sayyed Imam Al-Sharif
- Abu Ayyub al-Masri

== Bibliography ==
- Calvert, John, Sayyid Qutb and the Origins of Radical Islamism
- Eikmeier, Dale C., Qutbism: An Ideology of Islamic-Fascism
- Kenny, Joseph, Philosophy of the Muslim World
- Salama, Sammy and Bergoch, Joe-Ryan, Al-Jihad al-Islami
- Stanley, Trevor, Muhammad Abd al-Salam Faraj: Founder of Jama'at Al-Jihad, the group that killed Anwar Sadat
- Sageman, Marc (2004). Understanding Terror Networks. Philadelphia, PA: University of Pennsylvania Press. ISBN 0812206797.
- Gerges, Fawaz A. (2009) [2005]. The far enemy: why Jihad went global. 2010 reprint. New York: Cambridge University Press. ISBN 9780521519359.
