= Issam Alim =

Egyptian al-Jihad member

Issam Abdel-Tawab Abdel Alim (عصام عبدالتواب عبدالعليم) was a member of al-Jihad convicted in Egypt's Returnees from Albania case. He was the only member extradited from Bulgaria, following his capture by the CIA in Sofia in July 1998. He was one of 14 people subjected to extraordinary rendition by the CIA prior to the 2001 declaration of a war on terror.

During his interrogations, he alleged he was frequently tortured; his genitals were repeatedly electrocuted and his right arm incapacitated after being the subject of a "sharpening tool".

At trial, he described how the group began training its recruits in Yemen in 1990, where they were schooled in Sharia, political history of militant Islamic movements, surveillance techniques and document forgery. He also noted that he had met Muhammad al-Zawahiri in the country.

Held incommunicado from his arrest on July 13 until September 12, he was sentenced to either 10 or 15 years' imprisonment.
