= Yassir al-Sirri =

Egyptian militant

Yasser Tawfiq Ali El-Sirri (ياسر توفيق علي السري) (kunya Abu Ammar) is an Egyptian militant connected to the Vanguards of Conquest and al-Jama'a al-Islamiyya, sentenced to death in the 1998 Returnees from Albania trial.

Finding asylum in England, he became the director of the Islamic Information Centre.

== Early life ==
al-Sirri was born in the late 1950s and attended primary school in al-Mansurah from 1967–72, before going to school in Suez for the next ten years. He was arrested in Egypt on accusations of involvement in militant Islamist circles in September 1981. In 1982, he was given a dishonorable discharge from the Egyptian military after partaking in demonstrations against the government, and attended the Institute for Social Services in Port Said for the next five years. In 1984, he was jailed for three months for distributing pamphlets attacking Egyptian political leadership.

He eventually began working for al-Hidaya al-Islamiyah which helped the families of those Islamists arrested by the government.

He moved to Yemen in 1989, and subsequently to Sudan. He traveled to Peshawar, Pakistan three times, where he volunteered with charitable organisations helping the refugees from the Soviet–Afghan War from 1991–1992.

== Militant history ==
He was sentenced to death in absentia in 1993 or 1994, following the attempted assassination of Egyptian Prime Minister Atef Sedki which killed a 12-year-old schoolgirl named Shaimaa.

He fled to England in 1994 and claimed political asylum. He began producing the Islamic Media Monitor. Following the 1997 Luxor massacre, Egypt issued a list of fourteen wanted Islamists, including el-Sirri.

On April 29 and October 23, 1999, he received telephone calls from Ahmed Abdel Sattar. He was arrested in October 2001, charged with helping Sattar support Omar Abdel-Rahman, but the charges were dismissed seven months later.

In 2005, he gave statements to the media alleging Hosni Mubarak had rigged the Egyptian elections, and encouraged citizens to boycott the election.

On August 7, 2002, Egypt arrested both al-Sirri's brothers in Suez and held them in administrative detention. Yahya Tawfiq ‘Ali al-Sirri was a football trainer, and Muhammad Tawfiq ‘Ali al-Sirri was an engineer. On October 1, 2003, his uncle Al-Sayid Muhammad Hassan ‘Abd al-Ghani was also arrested and became a ghost prisoner.

In an interview which aired on Al-Hiwar TV on February 2, 2011 (as translated by MEMRI), Al-Sirri called for Egyptians to block international shipping through the Suez Canal in support of the revolution against Hosni Mubarak.
