= Ahmad Isma'il 'Uthman Saleh =

Ahmad Isma'il 'Uthman Saleh (أحمد إسماعيل عثمان) was a member of the Egyptian Islamic Jihad who was living in Albania. He was one of 14 people subjected to extraordinary rendition by the CIA prior to the 2001 declaration of a war on terror. He was charged in the Returnees from Albania trial.

He was ostensibly linked to the 1995 plot to blow up the Khan el-Khalili market, as well as the assassination of Speaker of Parliament Rifaat el-Mahgoub in October 1990.

He had previously been sentenced to death in absentia in October 1997 by an Egyptian court. Unlike the four colleagues with whom he was arrested, 'Uthman was not returned to Egypt until mid-August; being subjected to electroshock torture and beatings.

Together with the other three Returnees brought from Tirana, his capture and torture were listed as the main reasons for the 1998 United States embassy bombings.

Following the 1999 Returnees from Albania trial, he was executed in February 2000.
