= August 7th Memorial Park, Kenya =

Memorial park in Nairobi

August 7th Memorial Park
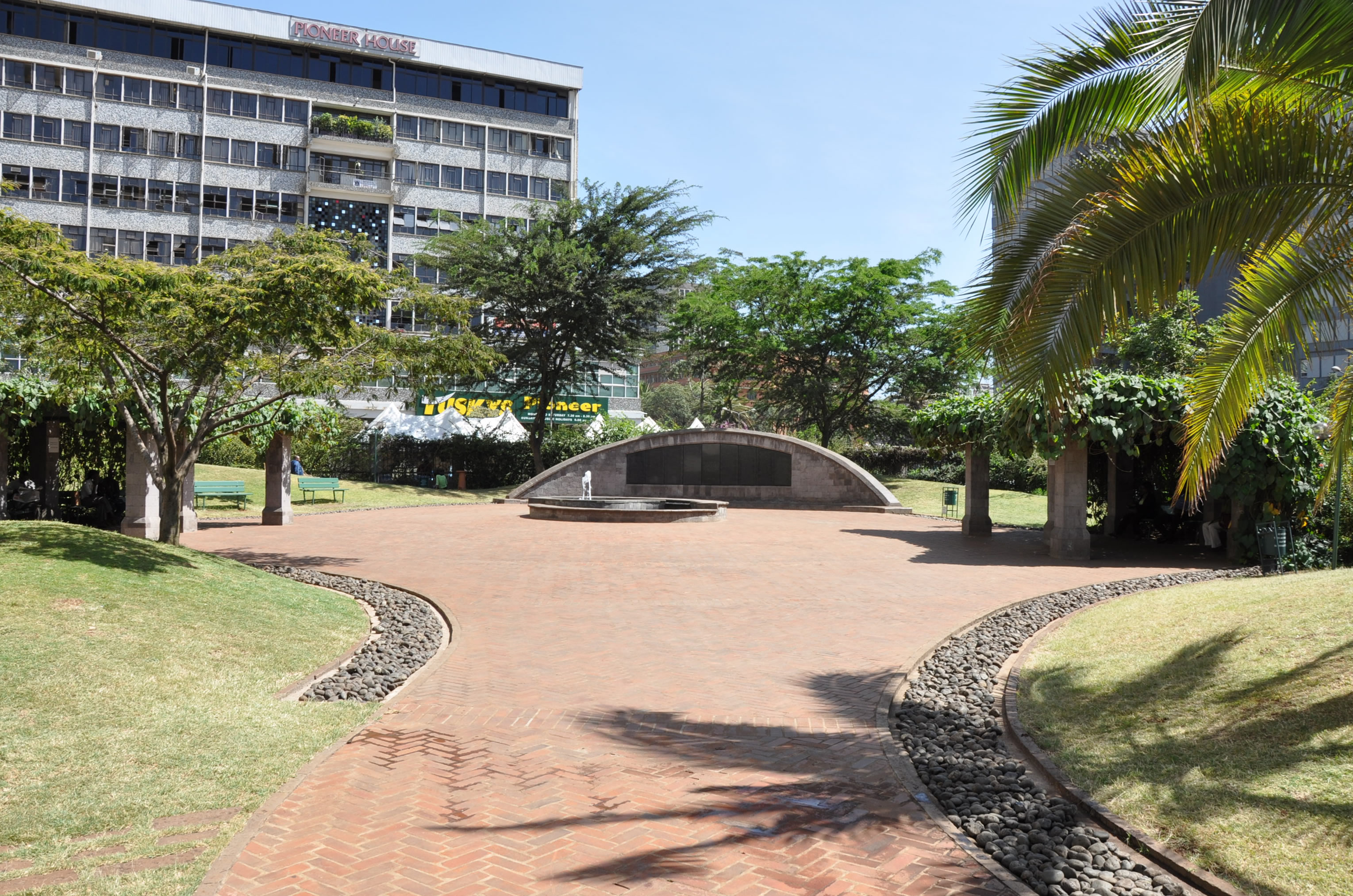
- August 7th Memorial Park

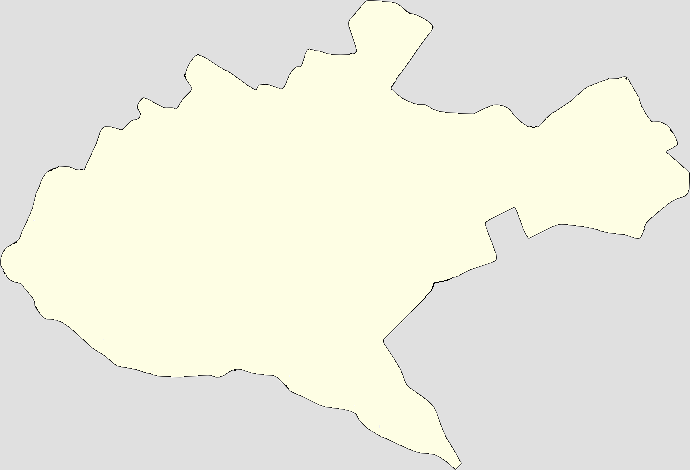
- Location within Nairobi
- Interactive map of August 7th Memorial Park
- Location: Nairobi, Kenya
- Coordinates: 1°17′19.26″S 36°49′40.37″E
- In memory of: 1998 United States embassy bombings

The August 7th Memorial Park is located at the 1998 United States embassy bombings scene along Haile Selassie Avenue in Nairobi, Kenya. It contains a notice board listing the names of all people that were reported dead after the incident.
