= Abdel-Majed Abdel Bary =

British Egyptian rapper and suspected militant of ISIL (1991–2023)

- عبد المجيد عبد الباري
- Born: 16 June 1991; Maida Vale, London, England
- Died: 26 July 2023 (aged 32); El Puerto de Santa María, Spain
- Other names: Lyricist Jinn; L Jinny; Lyricist Jinn Matic
- Occupations: Rapper and suspected Islamist militant
- Years active: 2011–2013
- Father: Adel Abdel Bari

Abdel-Majed Abdel Bary (Arabic: عبد المجيد عبد الباري; 16 June 1991 – 26 July 2023) was a British rapper and Islamic State militant. He was the son of Adel Abdel Bari.

After circulation of video footage related to the decapitation of the American journalist James Foley, British intelligence reportedly centred on three suspects who might be the militant in the footage dubbed "Jihadi John", putting a knife to Foley's throat and later on boasting of having undertaken his beheading.

Abdel Bary attained considerable notoriety as he emerged as a prime suspect in the hunt for "Jihadi John", but in February 2015, it was reported that the executioner was Londoner Mohammed Emwazi.

During his ISIS activities, Bary posed with a severed head and declared war on the West.

== Father ==
Abdel-Majed Abdel Bary is the son of Ragaa and Adel Abdel Bari. His father was arrested when Abdel-Majed Abdel Bary was six years old. His father was reportedly tortured in Egypt as a suspected radical Islamist. After release, he moved to the United Kingdom where he applied for political asylum with his wife and family.

After a very long process of investigation, with the possible return of Adel Abdel Bari to Egypt, he was extradited eventually by the British authorities to the United States in 2012 for involvement in the 1998 United States embassy bombings in Kenya and Tanzania and for having alleged links and a longtime association with Osama bin Laden and more prominently Ayman al-Zawahiri, former leader of al Qaeda.

On 6 February 2015, Adel Abdel Bari pleaded guilty and was sentenced to 25 years in prison – the plea bargain was described by the judge as generous.

== Early life and music career ==
Abdel Bary grew up in a council house in Maida Vale in West London.

Abdel Bary released a number of recordings online about his own life as a youth in London. In lyrics for earlier releases online going back to 2012, Bary made apparent references to drug use, violence and life on a council estate and talked about the threat of his family being deported to Egypt due to his father's terrorist activity. He also appeared in SBTV Warmup Sessions as Lyricist Jinn presenting two live tracks that talked about his experiences. In later songs, however, references to cannabis use stopped in his lyrics to be replaced with more radical tirades against people who choose to spend their money clubbing, drinking and on drugs rather than feeding their families. He was also part of a rap group known as "The Black Triangle".

As a rapper, he was known as Lyricist Jinn and L Jinny.

Known tracks by him include "Overdose" (the only one uploaded, now removed, to his YouTube channel LJinnyVEVO), "Flying High", "Dreamer", "The Beginning", and "Dog Pound." Some of his recordings were reportedly played on BBC Radio 1. As late as 1 December 2013, music featuring L. Jinny was still being released including the track "My Words" featuring L Jinny on the album More True Talk by Logic & Last Resort.

== Radicalisation ==
Abdel-Majed Abdel Bary was radicalized by Muslim groups connected to preacher Anjem Choudary in England. On 1 July 2013, he reportedly announced that he was giving up his musical aspirations for Islam. "I have left everything for the sake of Allah", he said, walking out of his family's home, leaving behind his mother Ragaa and his five siblings.

== ISIS activities ==
In 2013, Bary joined the jihadist opposition forces in Syria fighting the Syrian government of President Bashar al-Assad. In March 2014, he had a run-in with rival Free Syrian Army opposition forces, claiming in a tweet that he was kidnapped and tortured by them. He eventually joined the even more radical Islamic State of Iraq and Syria (ISIS/ISIL). In June 2014, The Sunday Times revealed a threat made by Bary on Twitter saying: "The lions are coming for you soon you filthy kuffs (infidels). Beheadings in your own backyard soon."

In early August 2014, he posted a photograph of himself holding a man's severed head allegedly taken in Raqqa, Syria, the stronghold of ISIL and declared capital for the ISIL self-proclaimed Islamic State. The caption read: "Chillin' with my homie or what's left of him." The Sunday Times and Sunday People listed Bary as a member of a group of four British-born ISIL members that have guarded, tortured, and beheaded foreign hostages in Syria, a group they called "The Beatles" ("John", "George", "Paul", and "Ringo") because of their British accents.

He was suspected of being the "Jihadi John" appearing in the execution video of James Foley. However, a representative of Scotland Yard told Billboard magazine in August 2014 that the man in the video had not definitively been identified. In February 2015, it was confirmed that "Jihadi John" is not Abdel Bary, but actually Mohammed Emwazi, a Kuwaiti-born man in his mid-20s who had left West London to join ISIS.

In 2014, his family home in London was raided by the British police which provoked a strong reaction from him on social media. He wrote on his Twitter account: "They have nothing to do with this, they did not even know where I am. I haven't lived at home for years you pagans." Bary kept an online presence using the name Abu Klashnikov on Twitter, but his account was eventually suspended. Bary also claimed that he and Junaid Hussain were kidnapped, tortured and robbed by members of a rival Islamic terror group.

In July 2015, it was reported that Bary was on the run in Turkey, after having left ISIS. He was believed to have disguised himself as a refugee and escaped during the ISIS retreat from Tal Abyad in June 2015.

== Arrest and death ==
On 21 April 2020, he and two other collaborators (Abderrezak Siddiki and Kossaila Chollouah) were arrested in Almería, Spain, in an operation led by the Spanish police and the National Intelligence Centre (CNI), who were aware that they had arrived on Spanish soil illegally in a dinghy on 14 April. Officers analyzed their social media and identified Siddiki ordered delivery food to Cádiz Street, where they arrested them.

On 12 July 2023, he was put on trial in Soto del Real, Madrid on charges related to membership of ISIS as well as using online scams to raise funds for terrorist activities. He denied all charges. During his court appearance in Spain, having gained a noticeable amount of weight and a drastically changed appearance, Abdel-Bary disavowed ISIS, saying "ISIS, Al Qaeda, I hate them", he went on to further condemn ISIS use of suicide attacks, claiming that "suicide, in my belief is prohibited, now imagine suicide to kill other people, this is way worse". He also emphasized his previous life in London, describing himself as "open minded" and having adopted the western lifestyle.

On the morning of 26 July 2023, he was found dead in his cell at Puerto III in El Puerto de Santa María, where he had been imprisoned pending the verdict in his trial. He was 32 and the body showed no signs of violence. His cause of death is unconfirmed, but according to his father Adel Abdel Megid, Abdel-Bary died due to anti depressant pills which were "forcefully assigned to him" in a clause signed by the prison. He claims he was buried in East London

== Adel Abdel Bari's appearance on Al Hiwar TV and claims of his son's murder ==
On 17 February 2025, during an interview on Al Hiwar TV, Adel Abdel Megid, the father of Abdel-Majed Abdel Bary, said that his son was'' innocent of the accusations'' made against him and that he had been ''influenced by Western media to travel to Syria, as had many other young people at the time''.

According to Adel Abdel Megid, his son was quietly transferred to Cordoba prison days after his court appearance without the prison notifying anyone. He went on to state that his son had died from an overdose of antidepressant medication that was forced upon him by medical staff at Cordoba Prison. According to him Abdel-Bary had never taken the medication before. Abdel Bary claims the prison director lied, and that iinitial reports from the prison claimed that Abdel Bary was found dead in the cell’s bathroom, but it was later revealed that he had died in the observation room. He added that in the days before his death, Abdel Bary had shown unusual behavior, such as no longer drinking coffee every day as he normally would, and that he stopped for 6 days, and that the antidepressant treatment had noticeably affected his mood and demeanor. Adel Abdel Megid also claimed that his son was buried in East London.
