= Mohamed Hassan Tita =

Mohamed Hassan Tita was a member of the Egyptian Islamic Jihad who was living in Albania. He was one of 14 people subjected to extraordinary rendition by the CIA prior to the 2001 declaration of a war on terror.

He was ostensibly linked to the 1995 plot to blow up the Khan el-Khalili market, as well as the assassination of Speaker of Parliament Rifaat el-Mahgoub in October 1990.

Together with the other three Returnees brought from Tirana, his capture and torture were listed as the main reasons for the 1998 United States embassy bombings.
