= Ibrahim Eidarous =

Egyptian militant

Ibrahim Hussein Abdel Hadi Eidarous
- Native name: ابراهيم حسين عبد الهادي عيداروس
- Born: c. 1957
- Died: July 2008 (aged 50–51); London, England
- Allegiance: Egyptian Islamic Jihad
- War: Soviet–Afghan War
- Children: 6

Ibrahim Hussein Abdel Hadi Eidarous (Arabic: ابراهيم حسين عبد الهادي عيداروس) (c. 1957 – July 2008) was an Egyptian militant who was alleged to have led the London-based chapter of al-Jihad. He was held in the custody of the United Kingdom from 1999, fighting extradition to the United States, where he was wanted in connection with the 1998 United States embassy bombings. He died of leukaemia in 2008.

== History ==
A man's face is his first identity that he presents to the world. Man's life is the unseen flowing river that is behind, around, and in front of us. Man's features relax or feel at ease only when he gets to the boat that can cross the river of time

— Ibrahim Eidarous, February 1999.

A member of al-Jihad's "Special Missions Committee" due to his skill at forging passports, Eidarous had fought in the Soviet invasion of Afghanistan in the 1980s, before accompanying Ayman al-Zawahiri on trips to Sudan and Yemen.

In December 1996, Ayman al-Zawahiri, Ahmad Salama Mabruk and Mahmud Hisham al-Hennawi were arrested by Russian authorities as they tried to cross into Chechnya. Eidarous and Tharwat Salah Shehata traveled to Dagestan to plead for the release of the "merchants" who they argued had been unfairly arrested.

The regional commander of al-Jihad in Baku, Azerbaijan, he traveled to London in 1996 to take over the leadership role in England from Adel Abdel Bary. There are suggestions that he initiated al-Jihad's presence in Azerbaijan, and that there was no activity in the country between August 1995 and May 1996.

== Arrest ==
He was arrested, along with Yasir al-Sirri, in Baku. He was arrested in September 1998 in the United Kingdom, as part of Operation Challenge, which arrested seven men living in Britain through use of the Prevention of Terrorism (Temporary Provisions) Act 1989, accusing them of links to al-Jihad. He was held in prison for three years in England after documents found on him revealed a possible link between al-Qaeda and the al-Jihad militants who had bombed the American embassies in 1998. At this time, he had a wife and six children.

In the indictment, Eidarous and Abdel Bary are accused of sending statements to several press organs shortly after the bombings, claiming to represent the people responsible.

Eidarous was diagnosed with advanced-stage leukaemia by 2002, and treated by the National Health Service in the UK, while being held at Broadmoor Hospital. He was released on house arrest, and died in July 2008 in London while awaiting extradition.
