= Hamden Khalif Allah Awad =

Perpetrator of US embassy bombing, 1998

- Born: 13 August 1970; Egypt
- Died: 7 August 1998 (aged 27); Dar es Salaam, Tanzania
- Cause of death: Suicide attack
- Other name: Ahmed the German

Hamden Khalif Allah Awad alias Ahmed the German (actually Egyptian) (August 13, 1970 – August 7, 1998) was one of the perpetrators of the 1998 United States embassy bombings in Kenya and Tanzania. He detonated the bomb in Tanzania, killing himself and 11 other people. In the 1998 indictment he is identified only as Ahmed the German. His real identity emerged later, from telephone calls made during this al-Qaeda conspiracy.
