= Thirwat Shehata =

Egyptian member of Islamic Jihad (born 1960)

Thirwat Salah Shehata (ثروت صالح شحاته) (also Tarwat Salah Abdallah) (born June 29, 1960) is a core member of Egyptian Islamic Jihad. Married to the sister of Mahmoud Jaballah, Shehata served as Jaballah's lawyer in Egypt.

== al-Jihad involvement, involvement with Mahmoud Jaballah ==
Shehata was alternately reported to have been sentenced to death, or a light prison sentence, in absentia in 1991 following the al-Jihad assassination of Anwar Sadat.

He maintained telephone contact with Jaballah through 1996 when the latter moved to Canada. In October, al-Jihad's London leader Adel Abdel Bary contacted Jaballah to mention he was shipping him several books and periodicals, including al-Mujahideen and al-Faqr for distribution in Canada, and copies of the Shifaa and some audiocassettes he asked him to forward on to Shehata.

In November 1996, Jaballah mentioned that he hadn't heard from "his father" recently, and Shehata assured him that he was alright and just having difficulty communicating lately. Canadian authorities have alleged this conversation was in reference to EIJ leader Ayman al-Zawahiri. Also in December, Shehata, now Jaballah's brother-in-law to whom he had offered financial support, told Jaballah that he was in Syria and preparing to go stay with "Daoud", believed to be a reference to Ibrahim Eidarous who was staying in Azerbaijan.

On December 13, Jaballah was informed that his friend "Najib" had been "hospitalised", which authorities suggest was a reference to Ahmad Salama Mabruk being imprisoned along with al-Zawahiri and Mahmud Hisham al-Hennawi by Russian authorities as they tried to cross into Chechnya. He promised to raise funds in Canada to help offset Nijab's troubles while Shehata did the same in Azerbaijan. Hani Yusef al-Sebai contacted Jaballah at this time, explaining that he was staying near Shehata and helping with the fundraising for the release.

Jabbalah contacted Ibrahim Eidarous on January 1 to ask how he would arrange a cash transfer from the British Bank of the Middle East to Azerbaijan under the name Khalil Yaseen Mohammed Mahmoud, and a few days later phoned Shehata to say he was unable to transfer the funds to him. Shehata told him to just send the funds for the release to Daoud's postal box in London instead. Eidarous and Shehata traveled to Dagestan to plead for the release of the "merchants" who they argued had been unfairly arrested. Shehata received permission to visit the prisoners, and is believed to have smuggled them $3000 which was later confiscated from their cell, and to have given them a letter which the Russians did not bother to translate. Shehata was sent on to Chechnya, where he met with Ibn Khattab.

In July 1998, Jaballah phoned Ibrahim Ismail Allam and passed on a message Shehata had asked him to deliver. Two days prior to the 1998 United States embassy bombings, Shehata was again contacted by Jaballah, and hours before the bombing happened Mabruk phoned Jaballah and asked him to get Eidarous to call him on Shehata's cell phone, and Jaballah passed on the message. The day after the bombings, Mabruk told Jaballah that he and Shehata were leaving Azerbaijan and that they should break off all contact now; but Shehata phoned Jaballah a short time later and informed him that he'd moved to Lebanon, but didn't have a phone in his new location. He never again contacted Jaballah, The Associated Press later stated that he had been again sentenced to death in absentia in 1998.

== Alleged involvement in al-Qaeda, arrest ==
Following the September 11th attacks in 2001, Shehata was put on a list of "12 most wanted terrorist suspects" by the United States, and accused of financing al-Qaeda.

In the lead-up to the 2003 American invasion of Iraq, CIA director George Tenet believed that Shehata and Yussef Dardiri were both being allowed to operate in Baghdad by Saddam Hussein since May 2002, and used this "intelligence" as part of the bid to tie the dictator to terrorism, suggesting that "Shehata was willing to strike US, Israeli, and Egyptian targets sometime in the future" and stating that he had trained "North Africans" in the use of truck bombs in Afghanistan.

In 2005, he was believed to be under a form of house arrest in Iran. In 2014, Shehata left Iran and was believed to have traveled to Libya. On April 7, 2014, Egyptian officials announced that local authorities captured Shehata in an apartment located in 10th of Ramadan City in Al Sharqia Governorate. At the time of his arrest, Shehata was believed to have been training al-Qaeda militants in eastern Libya.
