= Al-Salafiya al-Jihadiya in the Sinai =

Militant organization

Salafiya Jihadiya in the Sinai
- السلفية الجهادية في سيناء
- Founder: Mohammed Al-Zawahiri
- Dates active: 2012—Present
- Country: Egypt, Gaza Strip
- Ideology: Salafism; Salafi jihadism

Salafiya Jihadiya in the Sinai (Arabic: السلفية الجهادية في سيناء, romanized: al-Salafīyah al-jihādīyah fī Sīnāʼ, lit. 'Salafi Jihadist Movement in the Sinai') is an Egyptian/Gazan Salafi Jihadist militant organization with ties to Al-Qaeda.

== History ==
=== Formation ===
Salafiya Jihadiya in the Sinai was established in 2012 by Mohammed al-Zawahiri, it was created in order to fight Egyptian Security Forces and Israeli forces in the Sinai and Gaza Strip.

=== Presence in the Sinai ===
The group, and many other groups in the Sinai Peninsula, has ties with Al-Qaeda, and was one of the many groups who committed terrorist attacks on civilians and Egyptian Armed Forces during many periods of terrorist attacks in the Sinai in 2012 through 2013.

=== Presence in the Gaza Strip ===
Ever since the creation of the militant group, Al-Salafiya Al-Jihadiya has battled Egyptian Forces and Israeli Forces in-and-out the Gaza strip, but it is mostly considered a lone group since both the Salafist organizations, Sheikh Omar Hadid Brigade and the PIJ don't fully recognize themselves an ally of Al-Salafiya Al-Jihadiya in the Sinai.
