= Shawqi Salama Mustafa Atiya =

Alleged militant leader within al-Jihad

Shawqi Salama Mustafa Atiya (شوقي سلامة مصطفى عطيه) is an alleged militant leader within al-Jihad, and ran the Albanian office for the group. He was one of 14 people subjected to extraordinary rendition by the CIA prior to the 2001 declaration of a war on terror. He was sentenced as part of the Returnees from Albania trial in Egypt in 1999.

== Life ==
In 1987, Atiya married Jihan Hassan Mohamed Hassan, the daughter of Hasan Ahmed Hasan, and the couple moved to Saudi Arabia.

He was ostensibly linked to the 1995 plot to blow up the Khan el-Khalili market, as well as the assassination of Speaker of Parliament Rifaat el-Mahgoub in October 1990.

== Arrest ==
Egypt issued an arrest warrant for Atiya, and his five colleagues in Tirana, only on the advice of the United States.

Atiya claimed he was hanged from his limbs, kept in a cell filled with water to his knees, and suffered electrical shocks to his testicles, and was threatened with anal rape.

His wife was captured and tortured for three days in Lazogli, during which time she was repeatedly beaten, suspended from her limbs and subject to electrical shocks - she eventually said that Atiya had become "secretive" after the couple moved to Afghanistan, where he claimed to be working as a mechanic in a garage for Osama bin Laden. She said that records showed he was studying bomb-making, and by 1994 was involved in large-scale forgery operations when the couple moved to Tirana, Albania. - and the prosecutors recommended that they could use her as a witness against Atiya in the trial.

Together with the other three Returnees brought from Tirana, his capture and torture were listed as the main reasons for the 1998 US embassies bombings in Kenya and Tanzania.
