= Khalid al-Fawwaz =

Saudi Arabian al-Qaeda member (born 1962)

- Born: August 24 or 25, 1962 (age 63); Kuwait

Khalid Abd al-Rahman Hamd al-Fawwaz (Arabic: خالد عبد الرحمن حامد الفوز; kunya: Abu Omar al-Sebai (Arabic: أبو عمر السبيعي); born 24 or 25 August 1962) is a Saudi who was under indictment in the United States from 1998, accused of helping to prepare the 1998 United States embassy bombings. He was extradited to the United States and arraigned in October 2012.

Al-Fawwaz appeared on the UN 1267 Committee's list of individuals belonging to or associated with al-Qaeda, and was embargoed as a Specially Designated Global Terrorist by the US Treasury's Office of Foreign Assets Control.

According to the Treasury statement, al-Fawwaz was born on August 24 or 25, 1962. He moved to London in 1994. He was appointed by Osama bin Laden as the first head of the media organ called the Advice and Reform Committee in London, where he met Adel Abdel Bari and Abu Qatada, amongst others. In 1995, while bin Laden was in Sudan, al-Fawwaz was said to be attempting to pave the way for bin Laden to move to Britain.

He was arrested under the Prevention of Terrorism (Temporary Provisions) Act 1989, as part of Operation Challenge, which resulted in the arrest of seven UK-resident men, who were accused of links to al-Jihad. One of the men was charged with possession of a weapon. Six months after the arrests, British Muslims staged a demonstration in front of 10 Downing Street to protest against the continued incarceration of the seven men.

L'Houssaine Kherchtou, testifying for the United States, claimed that al-Fawwaz had been the leader of an "Abu Bakr Siddique camp", which he contradictingly placed in Hayatabad, Pakistan, or Khost, Afghanistan.

His trial, along with his co-defendant Abu Anas al Libi, also known as "Nazih al Raghie" or "Anas al Sebai", was scheduled to begin on 3 November 2014, before Judge Lewis A. Kaplan. At the same time, his co-conspirator, Abdel Bari, pleaded guilty.

He was sentenced to life imprisonment on 15 May 2015.
