= Ahmad Salama Mabruk =

Egyptian jihadi militant (1956–2016)

- Born: 1956; El Giza, Egypt
- Died: 3 October 2016 (aged 59–60); Jisr al-Shughur, Idlib Governorate, Syria
- Cause of death: Drone strike
- Other names: Abu al-Faraj al-Masri, Sharif
- Citizenship: Egyptian
- Children: Ibrahim, Musab, at least one daughter

Ahmad Salama Mabruk (Arabic: الشيخ أحمد سلامة مبروك; 1956 – 3 October 2016), known as Abu Faraj al-Masri (Arabic: أبو الفرج المصري), was a senior leader in the Syrian militant group Jabhat Fateh al-Sham and was previously a leader in Jabhat al-Nusra and the Egyptian Islamic Jihad (EIJ) militant groups. He was present alongside Ahmed al-Sharaa at the announcement of the creation of Jabhat Fateh al-Sham. He was one of 14 people subjected to extraordinary rendition by the CIA before the 2001 declaration of a war on terror.

== Life ==
A computer science graduate of Cairo University, Mabrouk graduated alongside Mustafa Hamza. He then joined the Egyptian Army as a reserve officer.

In 1981, Mabruk was arrested following the assassination of President Anwar Sadat, and sentenced to seven years imprisonment. Released in 1988, Mabruk moved to Afghanistan where Sayyed Imam Al-Sharif was gathering EIJ members. However, al-Sharif was replaced by Ayman al-Zawahiri as leader of the group in 1991, and the following year Mabruk moved to Sudan.

In 1994, Mabruk's 15-year-old son Musab, as well as the 15-year-old Ahmed, son of Mohammed Sharaf, were captured by the Egyptian General Intelligence Directorate and sexually abused. They were blackmailed with a videotape of the sodomy until they agreed to act as informants against their fathers' group. Musab went through his father's files and photocopied them for the Egyptians, but the Sudanese intelligence service saw the covert meetings and alerted the EIJ, recommending that they treat the boys leniently if they confessed. After Tariq Anwar found explosives in Musab's possession, al-Zawahiri convened a Sharia court, where Musab confessed he had been given the bomb by the Egyptians which he was told to detonate at the next Shura council meeting. They were each found guilty of "sodomy, treason, and attempted murder", and sentenced to death by firing squad. The trial, and the execution, were filmed and copies of the film were distributed by EIJ. The incident "catastrophically undermined" Mabruk's position in the organisation, and when the Sudanese found out about the executions, the EIJ was ordered to leave the country.

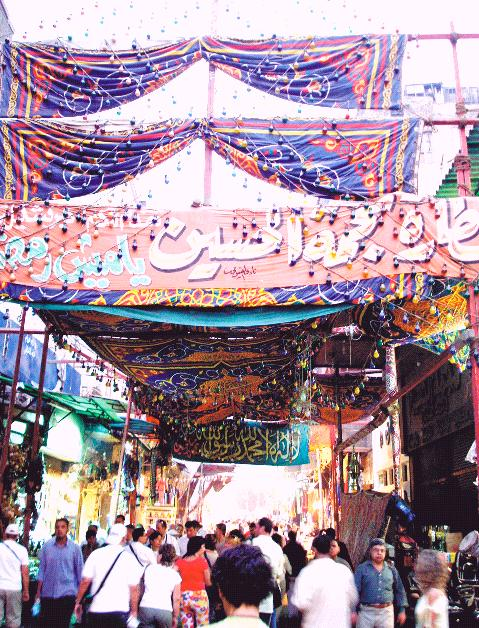
The Khan el-Khalili marketplace

Mabruk ran EIJ operations under the front organisation Bavari-C. He was a vocal critic of the group's close connections to Osama bin Laden, and criticised its leadership for allowing such a close relationship. In 1995, he was sentenced to death in absentia for plotting to bomb the Khan el-Khalili market in Cairo, along with Ahmad Ibrahim al-Sayyid al-Naggar and Adel Abdel Bary.

Throughout 1996, he maintained telephone contact with Canadian Mahmoud Jaballah, who was believed to be an EIJ organiser. At some point in the year, he traveled to Albania for several months where he was employed by the Society of the Revival of Islamic Heritage. His daughter married Abdullah Ahmed Abdullah.

== Arrest and imprisonment in Russia ==
On 1 December 1996, Mabruk and Mahmud Hisham al-Hennawi - both carrying false passports - accompanied Ayman al-Zawahiri on a trip to Chechnya, where they hoped to re-establish the faltering EIJ. Their leader was traveling under the name Abdullah Imam Mohammed Amin, and trading on his medical credentials for legitimacy. The group switched vehicles three times but was arrested within hours of entering Russian territory and spent five months in a Makhachkala prison awaiting trial. The trio pleaded innocence, maintaining their disguise and having other EIJ members from Bavari-C send the Russian authorities pleas for leniency for their "merchant" colleagues who had been wrongly arrested; and Russian Member of Parliament Nadyr Khachiliev echoed the pleas for their speedy release as EIJ members Ibrahim Eidarous and Tharwat Salah Shehata traveled to Dagestan to plead for their release. Shehata received permission to visit the prisoners and is believed to have smuggled them $3000 which was later confiscated from their cell, and to have given them a letter which the Russians didn't bother to translate.

In April 1997, they were sentenced to six months, and were subsequently released a month later and ran off without paying their court-appointed attorney Abdulkhalik Abdusalamov his $1,800 legal fee citing their "poverty". Shehata was sent on to Chechnya, where he met with Ibn Khattab. Zawahiri and Mabruk accompanied al-Hennawi to Baku, Azerbaijan where he'd managed to secure himself a position.

In June 1998, tired of Mabruk's criticisms of his relationship with bin Laden, al-Zawahiri allegedly banished him from the EIJ's central operations. He subsequently remained in Azerbaijan when Zawahiri left, and set up his militant cell under the Bavari-C name, replacing Eidarous as the regional commander, after his transfer to London.

== 1998 arrest in Azerbaijan ==
In August 1998, a wiretapped phone call tipped off the Israeli Mossad that a rendezvous between Ihab Saqr and an Iranian MOIS official was planned in Baku, Azerbaijan. Without a bureau in Azerbaijan, they contacted the American CIA, who allowed a Canadian-raised Mossad agent to unofficially tag along as seven or eight CIA officers based in Frankfurt oversaw a local police raid on the Baku hotel room on 20 August.

When the Azeri police received confirmation that Saqr was in his hotel room drinking coffee with others, they stormed the room grabbing all three people they found present and brought them still barefoot to the police station. It was now realised that the Iranian official hadn't yet shown up, and they had instead arrested Saqr, as well as Mabruk and Essam Marzouk. They were brought to the police station, where the Mossad agent says the police "beat the crap out of them". His laptop computer was seized, and yielded information on an Albanian cell, leading to a raid which saw five more arrested and extradited to Egypt. It also ostensibly confirmed the identity of more than a hundred others who were, or had been, arrested based on their links to the group.

An alternative telling of his arrest suggests that he had been arrested outside a Baku restaurant after American authorities had been tipped off by an informant inside the EIJ.

== Imprisonment in Egypt ==
Under interrogation and alleged torture, Mabruk claimed that the EIJ had acquired chemical weapons over the past two years and gave up the names and locations of dozens of EIJ members. Although previously sentenced to death in absentia, he was instead sentenced to 15 years imprisonment at the Huckstep Military Court.

While in prison, he began to lead a militant al-Marj group in the Abu Zabal prison camp. In the summer of 2004, he used this position to denounce an attempt by Nabil Na'eem to preach that violence was counter-productive to jihad. On 28 July 2008, it was announced that his son Ibrahim, who had worked as an "educator" close to the EIJ, had been killed in Pakistan, in the Predator drone airstrike on the Khyber Pakhtunkhwa province that killed Midhat Mursi.

In December 2007, al-Zawahiri announced he would take questions from the public and attempt to answer as many as he could. The 846th question asked if he knew whether it was true that Mabruk had been arrested while attempting to purchase red arsenic.

The following year, Zawahiri mentioned Mabruk as one of those leading the campaign to protest unfair treatment by Egyptian prison authorities who had neglected the medical needs of imprisoned militants.

== Release ==
Mabruk was released from prison following the Egyptian revolution of 2011.

By 2016, Mabruk had travelled to Syria, where he joined the central leadership of al-Nusra Front, the Syrian branch of al-Qaeda.

== Death ==
At approximately 5:15 pm on 3 October 2016, while being driven down a suburban street in the rebel stronghold of Jisr al-Shughur, Syria, Mabruk's car was hit by a drone strike, killing him and the driver instantaneously. Jabhat Fateh al-Sham confirmed Mabruk's death on a Twitter account run by the group.
