= Muhsin Musa Matwalli Atwah =

Egyptian al-Qaeda member (1964–2006)

Muhsin Musa Matwalli Atwah

Muhsin Musa Matwalli Atwah (Arabic: محسن موسى متولي عطوة) (June 19, 1964 – April 12, 2006) was an Egyptian national wanted by the United States government.

Also known as Abdul Rahman, Abu Abdul Rahman al-Muhajir, Abdel Rahman, Ibrahim al-Muhajir al-Masri, and Mohammed K.A. al-Namer, he was wanted by the United States government in connection to the August 7, 1998 American embassy bombings in Dar es Salaam, Tanzania and Nairobi, Kenya. Atwah built both of the bombs used in the attacks. For his role in the attacks, he was indicted in the United States District Court for the Southern District of New York.

Consequently, on October 10, 2001, Atwah was placed on the initial list of the FBI's top 22 Most Wanted Terrorists, which was released to the public by President Bush. Atwah had been a member of al-Qaeda since at least 1990 and provided explosives training in Afghanistan, Pakistan and Sudan, according to his indictment. The indictment also charged that Atwah had been part of an al Qaeda cell operating in Somalia in the early 1990s that provided training to Somali tribesmen who attacked U.S. forces in that country. By early 2006, he was suspected as a key supplier of arms to terrorists battling Pakistani forces in North and South Waziristan.

On April 12, 2006, Atwah was reported by an anonymous Pakistani Cabinet minister to have been killed along with six other militants, by Pakistani forces in a helicopter gunship raid on the village of Naghar Kalai near the Afghan border. Villagers reported that armed men removed the bodies. Atwah's death was confirmed by US officials on October 24, 2006, following DNA testing. His profile was then removed from the FBI's Most Wanted Terrorists website.
