= Rifaat el-Mahgoub =

Egyptian politician (1926–1990)

Rifaat El Sayed El Mahgoub
- رفعت المحجوب

8th Speaker of the People's Assembly of Egypt
- In office 22 June 1984 - 12 October 1990
- Appointed by: People's Assembly
- President: Hosni Mubarak
- Prime Minister: Kamal Hassan Ali; Ali Lutfi Mahmud; Atef Sedki
- Preceded by: Mohamed Kamel Leilah
- Succeeded by: Ahmad Fathi Sorour

Personal details
- Born: 23 April 1926 Damietta, Egypt
- Died: 12 October 1990 (aged 64) Cairo, Egypt
- Cause of death: Assassination by gunshot
- Education: Cairo University

Rifaat El Mahgoub (Arabic: رفعت المحجوب, IPA: [ˈɾefʕæt elmæħˈɡuːb]; 23 April 1926 – 12 October 1990) was an Egyptian politician who served as the 8th speaker of the People's Assembly of Egypt from 1984 until his assassination in 1990. He was a member of the then ruling National Democratic Party.

== Early life and education ==
Mahgoub was born in Damietta on 23 April 1926. He received a law degree from Cairo University in 1949. Then he obtained a PhD in economics from the Sorbonne.

== Career ==
Under Gamal Abdel Nasser's administration, Mahgoub took part in the preparatory committee and also participated in the Socialist Union as an official representing the universities. On 21 November 1959, he was appointed a member of the Socialist Union's Executive Bureau for the Cairo Governorate. In 1962 when he was selected to the membership of the charter preparation committee. In the national congress of 1962 he said: "Those who fear freedom are the fiercest enemies of freedom. Fear of freedom is an unforgivable crime". According to his interview in 1984 his disagreement with Nasser's administration was over the freedom of the university. He withdrew from political action in May 1967 and went to Beirut where he worked as a professor at the Arab University of Beirut from 1968 until 1970 in the School of Economics.

Purging the government, political and security establishments of the Nasserists, Anwar al-Sadat invited Mahgoub to take part in the Infitah policy phase and he took a series of teaching positions at Cairo University, eventually becoming dean of the faculty of Economics and Political Sciences in 1971.

On 2 October 1972, he was appointed by then President Anwar al-Sadat minister for presidential affairs. On 25 May 1975, he was appointed chairman of the committee supervising the restructuring of the Socialist Union's organizations, beginning with the bottom bases. Also in 1975, he was appointed deputy prime minister. But later he withdrew from political action again because of the methods of Sadat's administration. In 1977, Mahgoub drafted for Sadat a memorandum entitled "The New Course of the Open-door Intellectual, Political and Economic Policy". Later he had the opportunity to supervise the establishment of the Multi-party system.

After Sadat's assassination at the hands of Islamic militants, Mahgoub was invited to join the new administration. In February 1984, he announced his accession to the National Party and its Parliamentary Committee. In July 1984, he was elected speaker of the Egyptian House of Representatives, a position he held until his assassination on 12 October 1990.

== Death ==
On 13 October 1990, el-Mahgoub was shot dead while in his car on the streets of Cairo.

=== Perpetrators ===
Ahmad Isma'il 'Uthman Saleh, Ahmad Ibrahim al-Sayyid al-Naggar, Shawqi Salama Mustafa Atiya and Mohamed Hassan Tita were all renditioned from Albania to Egypt, with the cooperation of the United States, accused of participating in the assassination, as well as a later plot against the Khan el-Khalili market in Cairo. Their capture and torture were listed as the main reasons for the US embassies bombings in Kenya and Tanzania.

== Works ==
1. "The Actual Demand" for which he received the Egyptian State Incentive Award in 1963.

2. "Public Finances"

3. "Economic Development in Egypt"

4. "Socialism"

5. "National Sensitivities"

6. "Interest Rate and Balance"
