= 1998 United States embassy bombings =

Attacks on US embassies in Africa

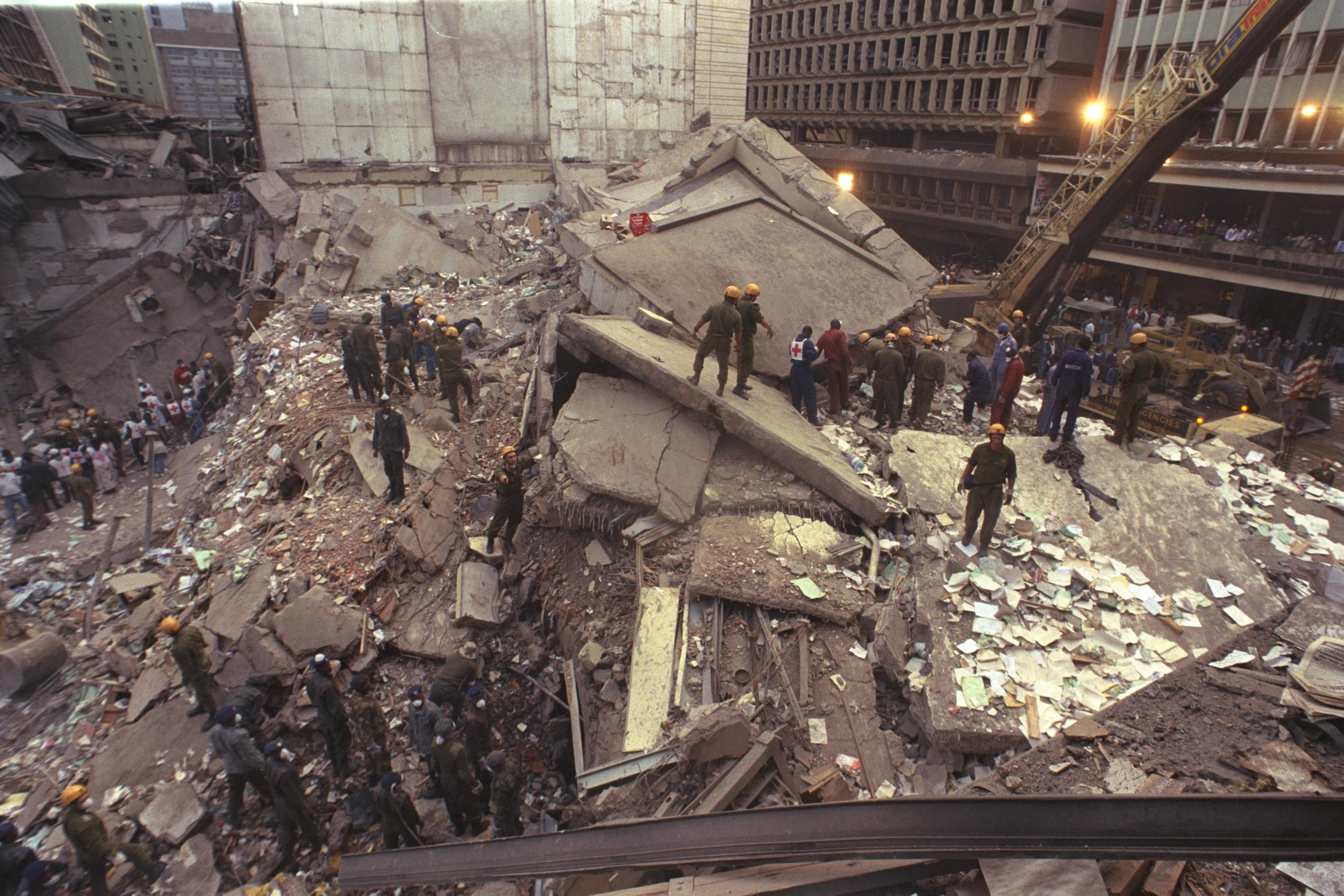
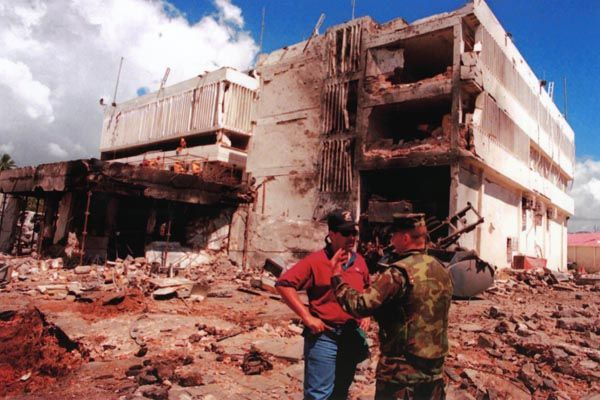
- From top, left to right: U.S. embassy in Nairobi after the explosion, with the collapsed Ufundi Building.; The U.S. embassy in Dar es Salaam, Tanzania, in the aftermath of the explosion.
- Location: 01°17′21″S 36°49′36″E and 06°47′21″S 39°16′46″E; Nairobi, Kenya; Dar es Salaam, Tanzania
- Date: August 7, 1998; 28 years ago 10:30 a.m. – 10:40 a.m. EAT (UTC+3)
- Target: United States embassies
- Attack type: Suicide bombings; truck bombings; mass murder
- Weapons: Truck bombs filled with TNT and ammonium nitrate; Handgun; Stun grenade
- Deaths: 224 (Note: 213 in Nairobi, 11 in Dar es Salaam)
- Injuries: 4,000+ (Note: 4,000+ in Nairobi, 85 in Dar es Salaam)
- Perpetrators: Al-Qaeda; Egyptian Islamic Jihad
- Assailants: Mohamed Rashed Daoud Al-Owhali; Jihad Mohammed Ali; Hamden Khalif Allah Awad; Mohammed Odeh
- Motive: Revenge for the extradition and alleged torture of Egyptian Islamic Jihad members

The 1998 United States embassy bombings were a series of terrorist attacks that occurred on August 7, 1998. More than 220 people were killed in two nearly simultaneous truck bomb explosions in two East African capital cities, one at the United States embassy in Dar es Salaam, Tanzania, and the other at the United States embassy in Nairobi, Kenya.

Fazul Abdullah Mohammed and Abdullah Ahmed Abdullah were deemed responsible with planning and orchestrating the bombings. In retaliation for the bombings, U.S. president Bill Clinton ordered Operation Infinite Reach on August 20, 1998.

== Motivation and preparation ==
Many American sources concluded that the bombings were intended as revenge for United States involvement in the extradition and alleged torture of four members of Egyptian Islamic Jihad (EIJ) who had been arrested in Albania in the two months prior to the attacks for a series of murders in Egypt. Between June and July, Ahmad Isma'il 'Uthman Saleh, Ahmad Ibrahim al-Sayyid al-Naggar, Shawqi Salama Mustafa Atiya, and Mohamed Hassan Tita were all renditioned from Albania to Egypt with the co-operation of the U.S.; the four men were accused of participating in the assassination of Rifaat el-Mahgoub, as well as a later plot against the Khan el-Khalili market in Cairo. The following month, a communique was issued warning the United States that a "response" was being prepared to "repay" them for their interference. However, the 9/11 Commission Report claims that preparations began shortly after Osama bin Laden issued his February 1998 fatwa.

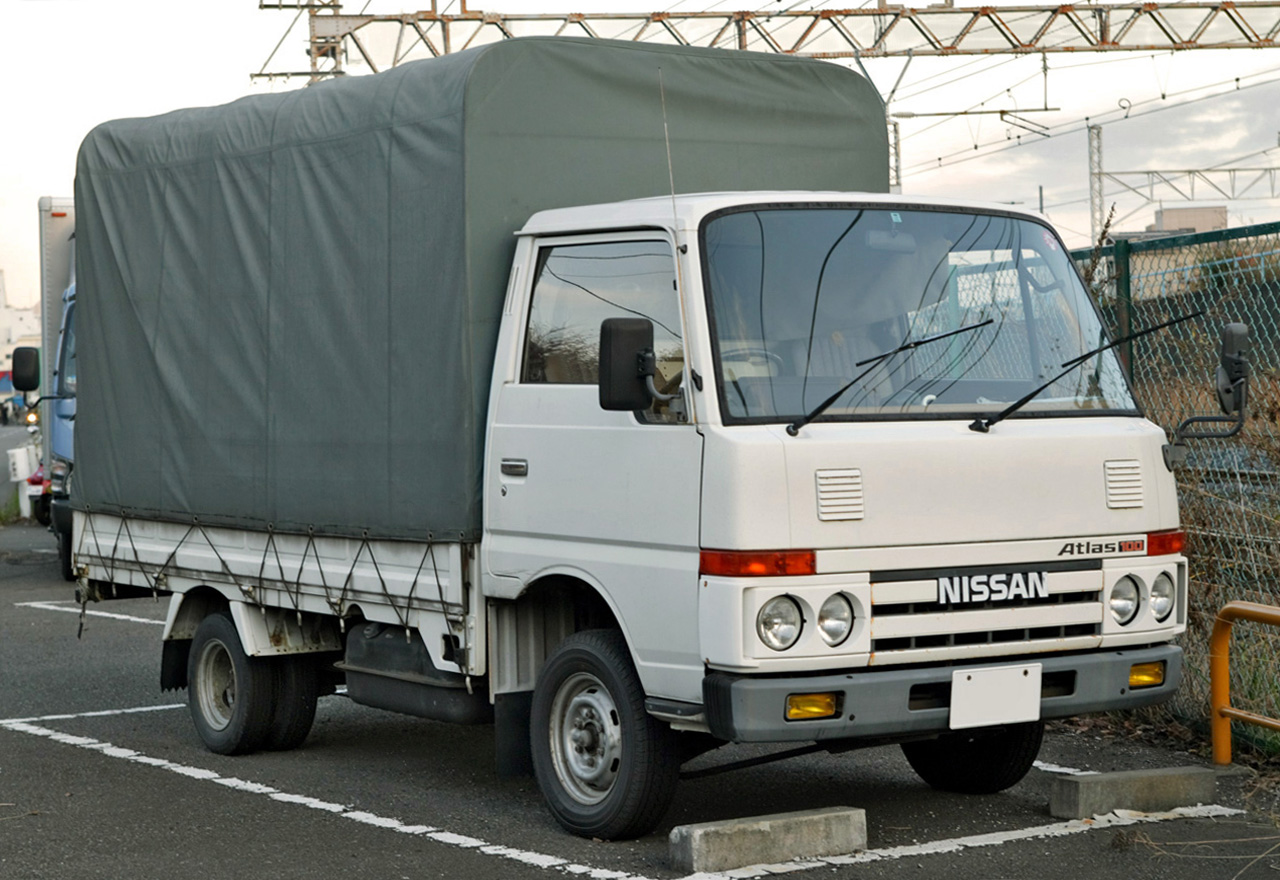
A Nissan Atlas truck, similar to that used in Dar es Salaam

According to journalist Lawrence Wright, the Nairobi operation was named after the Kaaba in Mecca; the Dar es Salaam bombing was called Operation al-Aqsa in Jerusalem, but "neither had an obvious connection to the American embassies in Africa. Bin Laden initially said that the sites had been targeted because of the 'invasion' of Somalia; then he described an American plan to partition Sudan, which he said was hatched in the embassy in Nairobi. He also told his followers that the genocide in Rwanda had been planned inside the two American embassies." Wright concludes that bin Laden's actual goal was "to lure the United States into Afghanistan, which had long been called 'The Graveyard of Empires.'"

In the second half of 1999, bin Laden spoke to a crowd of graduates from a training camp in Afghanistan about the attacks and explained the reasons for targeting the Nairobi embassy. Bin Laden said Operation Restore Hope in Somalia was directed from the Nairobi embassy and claimed the lives of 30,000 Muslims, the Southern Sudanese rebel leader John Garang was supported from there and it was the largest American Intelligence center in East Africa.

In May 1998, a villa in Nairobi was purchased by one of the bombers to enable a bomb to be built in the garage. Sheikh Ahmed Salim Swedan purchased a beige Toyota Dyna truck in Nairobi and a 1987 Nissan Atlas refrigeration truck in Dar es Salaam. Six metal bars were used to form a "cage" on the back of the Atlas to accommodate the bomb.

In June 1998, KK Mohamed rented House 213 in the Illala district of Dar es Salaam, about four miles (six kilometers) from the U.S. embassy. A white Suzuki Samurai was used to haul bomb components, hidden in rice sacks, to House 213.

In both Nairobi and Dar es Salaam, Mohammed Odeh supervised construction of two very large 2,000-pound (900 kg) destructive devices. The Nairobi bomb was made of 400 to 500 cylinders of TNT (about the size of drink cans), ammonium nitrate, aluminum powder, and detonating cord. The explosives were packed into twenty specially designed wooden crates that were sealed and then placed in the bed of the trucks. Muhsin Musa Matwalli Atwah ran a wire from the bomb to a set of batteries in the back of the truck cab and then to a detonator switch beneath the dashboard. The Dar es Salaam bomb was of slightly different construction: the TNT was attached to fifteen oxygen tanks and gas canisters and was surrounded with four bags of ammonium nitrate fertilizer and some sandbags to tamp and direct the blast.

The bombings were scheduled for August 7, the eighth anniversary of the arrival of U.S. troops in Saudi Arabia during the early stages of the Persian Gulf War, likely a choice by bin Laden.

When bin Laden's bodyguard asked him after the attacks whether so many victims were really necessary, he replied referring to al-Qaeda's 1996 and 1998 fatwas declaring war on America and Israel: "We warned the whole world what would happen to the friends of America. We weren't responsible for any victims from the minute we warned those countries."

== Attacks and casualties ==
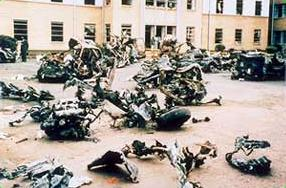
Wreckage and debris from the Nairobi bombing

On August 7 between 10:30 a.m. and 10:40 a.m. local time (3:30–3:40 a.m. EDT), suicide bombers in trucks loaded with explosives parked outside the embassies in Dar es Salaam and Nairobi, and almost simultaneously detonated. A total of 213 people were killed in the Nairobi blast, while 11 were killed in Dar es Salaam. An estimated 4,000 in Nairobi were wounded, and another 85 in Dar es Salaam. Seismological readings analyzed after the bombs indicated energy of between 3 and 17 short tons (3 and 15 metric tons) of high-explosive material. Although the attacks were directed at U.S. facilities, the vast majority of casualties were local citizens of the two African countries. Twelve Americans were killed, including two Central Intelligence Agency employees in the Nairobi embassy, Tom Shah (aka Uttamlal Thomas Shah) and Molly Huckaby Hardy. U.S. Marine Sergeant Jesse "Nathan" Aliganga, a Marine Security Guard at the Nairobi embassy, and U.S. Army Staff Sergeant Kenneth Ray Hobson II were also killed in the attack.

While Jihad Mohammed Ali, 24, alias 'Azzam' drove the Toyota Dyna quickly toward the Nairobi embassy along with Mohamed Rashed Daoud Al-Owhali, local security guard Benson Okuku Bwaku was warned to open the gate immediately and fired upon when he refused to comply. Al-Owhali threw a stun grenade at embassy guards before exiting the vehicle and running off. Osama bin Laden later offered the explanation that it had been Al-Owhali's intention to leap out and shoot the guards to clear a path for the truck, but that he had left his pistol in the truck and subsequently ran off. As Bwaku radioed to Marine Post One for backup, the truck detonated.

The explosion damaged the embassy building and collapsed the neighboring Ufundi Building where most victims were killed, mainly students and staff of a secretarial college housed there. The heat from the blast was channeled between the buildings towards Haile Selassie Avenue where a packed commuter bus was burned. Windows were shattered in a radius of nearly 1/2 mi (800 meters). A large number of eye injuries occurred because people in buildings nearby who had heard the first explosion of the hand grenade and the shooting went to their office windows to have a look when the main blast occurred and shattered the windows.

Meanwhile, the Atlas truck that attacked the U.S. Embassy at 36 Laibon Road, Dar es Salaam was being driven by Hamden Khalif Allah Awad, known as "Ahmed the German" due to his blond hair, a former camp trainer who had arrived in the country only a few days earlier. The death toll was less than in Nairobi as the U.S. embassy was located outside the city center in the upscale Oysterbay neighborhood, and a water truck prevented the suicide bombers from getting closer to the structure.

Following the attacks, a group calling itself the "Liberation Army for Holy Sites" took credit for the bombings. U.S. investigators believe the term was a cover used by Egyptian Islamic Jihad, who had actually perpetrated the bombing.

== Aftermath and international response ==
Servicemen unload a casket at Andrews Air Force Base containing the remains of an American killed in Nairobi

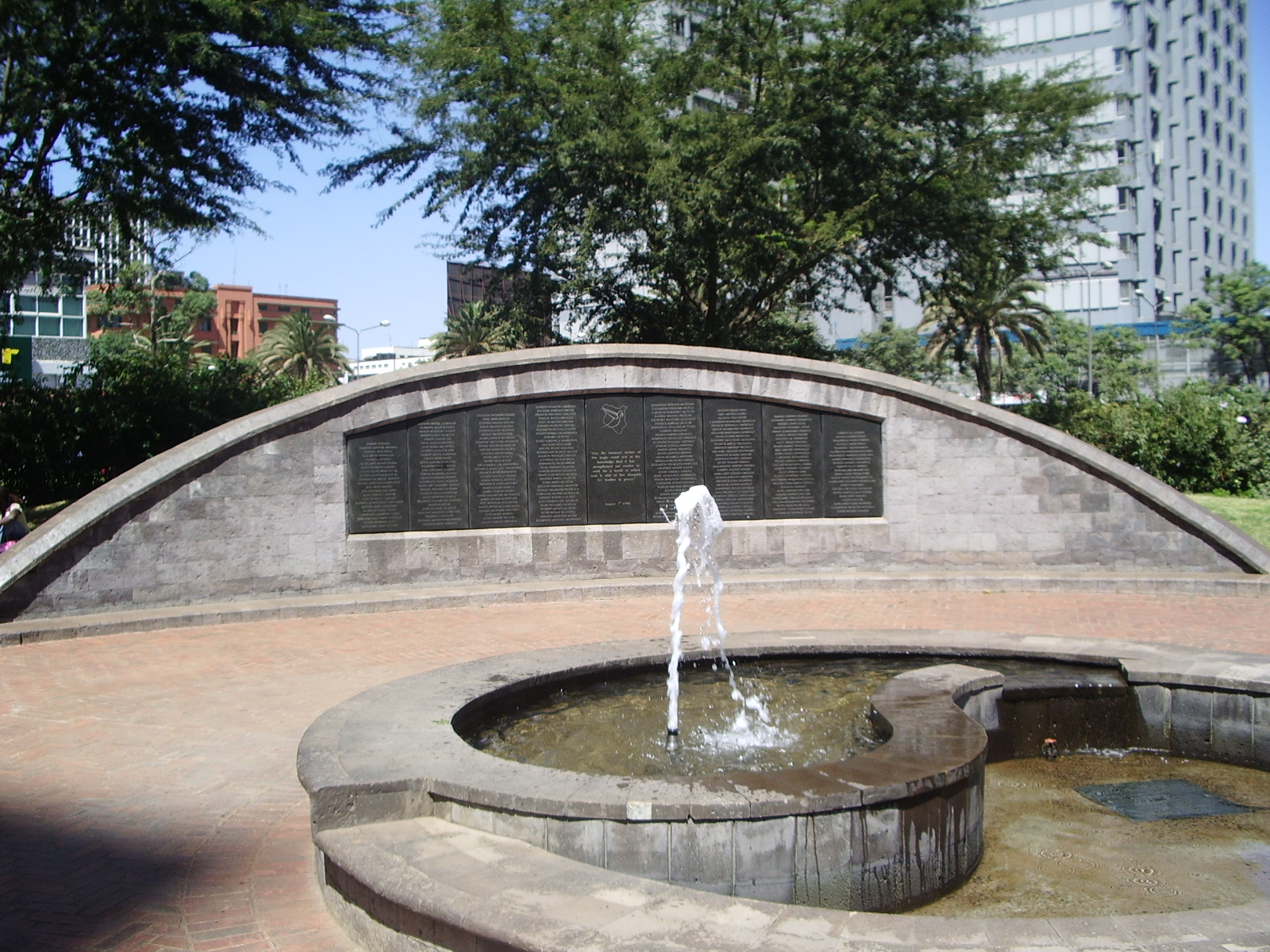
Memorial park at the site of the embassy in Nairobi, 2007

In response to the bombings, President Bill Clinton ordered Operation Infinite Reach, a series of cruise missile strikes on targets in Sudan and Afghanistan on August 20, 1998, announcing the planned strike in a prime-time address on U.S. television.

The United Nations Security Council passed Resolution 1189 condemning the attacks on the embassies.

Both embassies were heavily damaged and the Nairobi embassy had to be rebuilt. It is now located across the road from the United Nations Office at Nairobi for security purposes.

A memorial park was constructed on the former embassy site, dedicated on the third anniversary of the attack. Public protest marred the opening ceremony after it was announced that the park, including its wall inscribed with the names of the dead, would not be free to the public.

Within months following the bombings, the United States Department of State Bureau of Diplomatic Security added Kenya to its Antiterrorism Assistance Program (ATA), which was originally created in 1983. While the addition was largely a formality to reaffirm U.S. commitment to fighting terrorism in Kenya, it nonetheless sparked the beginning of an active bilateral antiterrorism campaign by the United States and Kenya. The U.S. government also rapidly and permanently increased the monetary aid to Kenya. Immediate changes included a $42 million grant targeted specifically towards Kenyan victims.

=== Opati v. Republic of Sudan ===
In 2001, James Owens and others filed a civil lawsuit against Sudan for its role in the attack under the Foreign Sovereign Immunities Act with the recently added 1996 amendments for state-sponsored terrorism. They argued that Sudan was at fault for providing sanctuary to the bombers prior to the attack. The lawsuit was prolonged over a decade, hampered in part by the lack of Sudan sending counsel at times, but further struggled when the legal system ruled that foreign nations had sovereign immunity from causes of action in civil lawsuits based on the current language of the Foreign Sovereign Immunities Act in a 2004 case. Congress amended the Foreign Sovereign Immunities Act in 2008 to correct this and to allow its provisions to retroactively apply to existing lawsuits, including Owens' case. With that, hundreds more plaintiffs joined the suit, eventually with more than 700 parties listed. By 2014, the district court awarded the plaintiffs over $10 billion. Sudan, which had not appeared during the initial lawsuit, appealed the judgment, arguing it did not understand the US civil suit system and did not understand the consequences of not appearing, but also challenged the retroactive nature of the 2008 change to the Foreign Sovereign Immunities Act. The appeals court discounted Sudan's argument regarding its lack of understanding, and upheld the lower court's finding that Sudan was liable for the bombings, but ruled that the $4.3 billion of punitive damages could not be applied retroactively. The plaintiffs petitioned to the Supreme Court to appeal, and in May 2020, the Court ruled in Opati v. Republic of Sudan that the punitive damages could be retroactively applied, restoring the $4.3 billion that had been awarded at the District Court.

In October 2020, President Donald Trump announced that the United States would remove Sudan from the State Sponsors of Terrorism list, after they had agreed to pay $335 million in compensation to the families of victims of the embassy bombings.

== Indictment ==
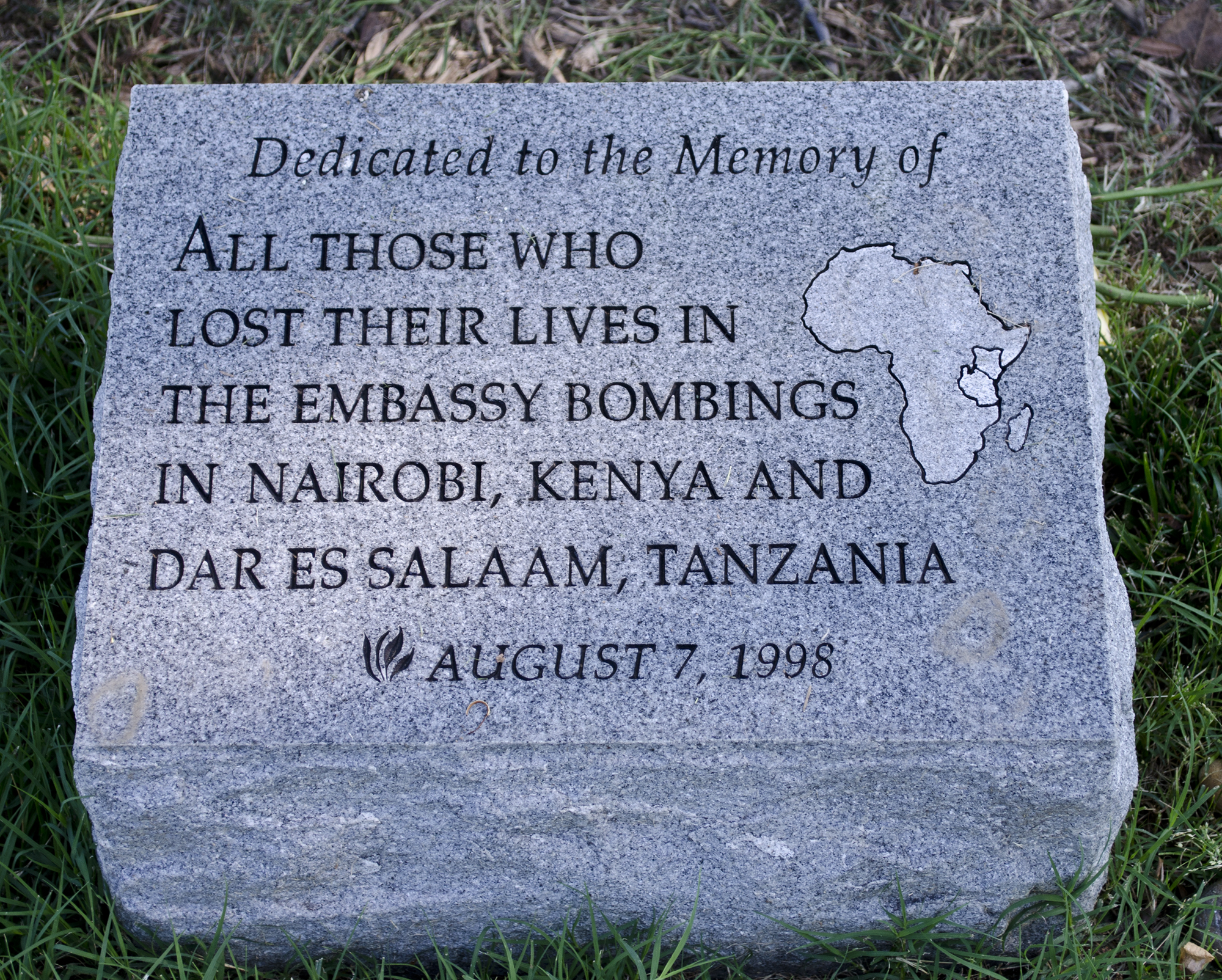
Memorial at Arlington National Cemetery

Following the investigation, an indictment was issued. It charges the following 21 people for various alleged roles in the bombings. All of the cases have been resolved.

Name	Disposition
Osama bin Laden	Killed in Abbottabad, Pakistan on May 2, 2011
Muhammad Atef	Killed in Kabul, Afghanistan on November 14, 2001
Ayman al Zawahiri	Killed in Kabul, Afghanistan on July 31, 2022
Saif al Adel	Fugitive, the de facto leader of Al Qaeda
Mamdouh Mahmud Salim	Serving a life sentence without parole in the United States
Abdullah Ahmed Abdullah	Killed in Tehran, Iran on August 7, 2020
Muhsin Musa Matwalli Atwah	Killed in Naghar Kalai, Pakistan on April 12, 2006
Khalid al Fawwaz	Serving a life sentence without parole in the United States
Wadih el Hage	Serving a life sentence without parole in the United States
Anas al Libi	Died in 2015 while awaiting trial in the United States
Ibrahim Eidarous	Died in 2008 while under house arrest in the United Kingdom
Adel Abdel Bari	Served a sentence of 25 years imprisonment in the United States
Fazul Abdullah Mohammed	Killed in Mogadishu, Somalia by Somali government troops on June 7, 2011
Ahmed Mohammed Hamed Ali	Killed in Pakistan in 2010
Mohammed Sadeek Odeh	Serving a life sentence without parole in the United States
Mohamed Rashed Daoud al-'Owhali	Serving a life sentence without parole in the United States
Mustafa Mohamed Fadhil	Killed in Afghanistan in March 2002
Khalfan Khamis Mohamed	Serving a life sentence without parole in the United States
Ahmed Khalfan Ghailani	Serving a life sentence without parole in the United States
Fahid Mohammed Ally Msalam	Killed in Pakistan on January 1, 2009
Sheikh Ahmed Salim Swedan	Killed in Pakistan on January 1, 2009

== See also ==
- List of terrorist incidents in 1998
- List of Islamist terrorist attacks
- Terrorism in Kenya
- 1998 World Cup terror plot
- Attacks on the United States
