= Advice and Reform Committee =

British office of what is now called al-Qaeda

The Advice and Reform Committee or Advice and Reformation Committee (ARC) (Arabic: هيئة النصيحة والاصلاح) was the British office of what is now called al-Qaeda from 1994 until the arrest of Khalid al-Fawwaz in 1998. A U.S. grand jury indictment of Osama bin Laden, al-Fawwaz, and 19 others reads in part

On or about July 11, 1994, the defendant OSAMA BIN LADEN created the London office of al Qaeda, naming it the "Advice and Reformation Committee" and placing the defendant KHALID AL FAWWAZ in charge;

and in part

In or about 1994, the defendant OSAMA BIN LADEN, working together with KHALID AL FAWWAZ, a/k/a "Khaled Abdul Rahman Hamad al Fawwaz", a/k/a "Abu Omar", a/k/a "Hamad", set up a media information office in London, England (hereafter the "London office"), which was designed both to publicize the statements of OSAMA BIN LADEN and to provide a cover for activity in support of al Qaeda's "military" activities, including the recruitment of military trainees, the disbursement of funds and the procurement of necessary equipment (including satellite telephones) and necessary services. In addition, the London office served as a conduit for messages, including reports on military and security matters from various al Qaeda cells, including the Kenyan cell, to al Qaeda's headquarters.

Bin Laden wrote several documents which he signed on behalf of ARC: his 1994 statement about Saudi Grand Mufti Abdul-Aziz bin Baz, and a 1995 reaction to the arrest of some clerics in Saudi Arabia.

According to Ahmad Thomson, a London-based attorney testifying for the defense at the trial of Khaled al-Fawwaz, the Advice and Reform Committee was designed to promote "peaceful and constructive reform" in Saudi Arabia. However, prosecutors described the organization as an Al Qaeda front. Bin Laden may have formed the organization with the intent to seek asylum in the United Kingdom after King Fahd of Saudi Arabia revoked his citizenship, but the British Home Office rapidly issued an exclusion order barring him from entering the country.
