= Muhammad al-Zawahiri =

Egyptian Islamist (1953–2024)

- محمد الظواهري
- Born: 1952/1953; Dokki, Giza, Egypt
- Died: 13 February 2024 (aged 71); Giza, Egypt
- Relatives: Ayman al-Zawahiri (brother)

Muhammad Rabie al-Zawahiri (Arabic: محمد ربيع الظواهري; 1952/1953 – 13 February 2024) was an Egyptian Islamist who was a member of Egyptian Islamic Jihad and one of 14 people subjected to extraordinary rendition by the CIA prior to the 2001 war on terror. He was the younger brother of Al Qaeda leader Ayman al-Zawahiri.

== Early life ==
Muhammad Rabie al-Zawahiri was born in Dokki, Giza, Egypt around 1953.

A 1974 graduate of the engineering college at Cairo University, al-Zawahiri moved to Saudi Arabia and took work with a construction firm.

In 1981, his name was among those indicted in absentia for the assassination of Anwar Sadat after his brother implicated him in recruiting Egyptians Mustafa Kamel Mustafa and Abdel Hadi al-Tunsi while living in Saudi Arabia, but he was found not guilty of the charge. He joined the World Islamic Relief Organization, and traveled to Indonesia, Bosnia, and Malawi, where he helped build schools and medical clinics.

Married with six children, al-Zawahiri moved to Yemen with his family, and then joined his older brother in Khartoum, where al-Jihad had begun to congregate. But after the group was forced to leave following the execution of the teenaged son of Ahmad Salama Mabruk, Ayman went to Afghanistan while Muhammad took his family back to Yemen and began working with engineering contractors.

== Arrest ==
Al-Zawahiri's Yemeni contractor work saw him frequently travel to the United Arab Emirates for business, but following his in absentia conviction in the Returnees from Albania trial, he was arrested in March or April 1999 in the United Arab Emirates and renditioned to Cairo. Here, he was accused of conspiring with Khaled Abdul Samee. His wife did not contact the Egyptian embassy in Sanaa until October, and they confirmed his arrest. She was granted permission to return to Cairo with the children herself, and was detained and interrogated for three days before being released.

Al-Zawahiri's younger brother, Hussain, was arrested while driving to work, while working at Multidiscovery, a Malaysian construction firm in late 1999 in a joint operation involving the CIA, Egyptian intelligence and Malaysian security forces.

== Captivity ==
For several years, no news was released on al-Zawahiri and his family presumed he had been executed in accordance with the sentence from the trial. In October 2001, the United States requested a sample of his DNA to match against bodies found in Afghan caves hoping to identify one of the bodies as belonging to his older brother.

In February 2004, the al-Sharq al-Awsat newspaper announced that they had discovered he was still alive and being held in the Tora Prison, which was confirmed the following month by the Egyptian Ministry of the Interior, who also stated that he could be visited by his family in March. It was alleged that he had been beaten and tortured for nearly five years by the Mukhabarat, Egypt's intelligence service. Egypt announced they were re-convening a new tribunal to look at his case.

In July 2006, lawyer Mamdouh Ismail reported about an individual with the alias Sharif Hazaa (شريف هزاع Šarīf Hazāʿ), whom he believed to be the al-Zawahiris' associate Abu Ayyub al-Masri. The further fate of al-Masri conflicts with Ismail's assessment, and it may be that "Hazaa" was actually Muhammad al-Zawahiri (or some other Returnee from Albania prisoner).

In April 2007, he and other Islamists pushed for a review of their sentences and sought commutation based on revising their previously-held beliefs in the necessity of terrorism. He was represented by lawyer Montasser el-Zayat.

== Release ==
In March 2011, he was released from prison in Egypt, but quickly re-arrested. He was subsequently re-tried in an Egyptian military court on terrorism charges and acquitted of all charges, and was released in March 2012.

In 2012 he established jihadist organization Al-Salafiya al-Jihadiya in the Sinai

In September 2012, Zawahiri offered to mediate a 10-year hudna between Islamists and the Western world, in return for which the United States and the West would stop intervening in Muslim lands, stop allegedly interfering in Muslim education, end the so-called "war on Islam", and release all Islamist prisoners.

In an interview which aired on Egypt's CBC TV on 4 October 2012 (as translated by MEMRI), Al-Zawahiri denied "belong[ing] to Al-Qaeda or any other organization" but stated that "ideologically speaking, I am in agreement with all these organizations. Our common denominator is the Islamic shari'a." Regarding Israel and Jews, Al-Zawahiri declared that "Fighting Israel, fighting the Jews is a religious duty incumbent upon all. The Egyptian government should have been fighting the Jewish enemy...This is a religious duty incumbent upon all Muslims."

== Later activities ==
Muhammad al-Zawahiri was involved in the organization of the 11 September 2012 protest at the United States embassy in Cairo.

On 18 January 2013, he organized a protest outside France's embassy in Cairo against French intervention in Mali. He described France's military actions as "threatening of the return of French colonialism on Arab and Islamic peoples" and stated that France was at war with Islam.

In August 2013, in the wake of the overthrow of President Morsi, Zawahiri was arrested. In April 2014 Zawahiri, with 67 others, was charged with forming a terrorist group and seeking to undermine security across Egypt. On 17 March 2016, Zawahiri was released from prison.

== Death ==
Muhammad al-Zawahiri died on 13 February 2024, at the age of 71. His death was confirmed by pro-Al Qaeda clerics. Zawahiri died at his home in Giza, Egypt.
