= Vanguards of Conquest =

Terrorist organization in Egypt

The Vanguards of Conquest (Talaa'al al-Fateh) is a terrorist organization that was originally founded in 1993 as a branch of the Egyptian Islamic Jihad operating in Somalia but became a separate faction that eventually folded back into the group under the leadership of Ayman al-Zawahiri. The revived group is currently led by Magdy Salem. The group has intervened to stop jihadis in the Sinai Peninsula from attacking Israel.

== History ==
In its first year, the Vanguards carried out two failed assassination attempts, the first in August, a Cairo bombing that only managed to injure Egyptian Interior Minister Hasan al-Alfi, and three months later a similar bombing aimed at Prime Minister Atef Sedki, which killed a teenage girl at a bus stop.

In late May 1995, Hassan al-Turabi met with Ayman al-Zawahiri to discuss the future of the Vanguards of Conquest; now to operate solely out of Egypt. al-Zawahiri and Mstafa Hamzah organised a meeting in Ferney-Voltaire on the French-Swiss border, attended by a colleague of Tal'at Fu'ad Qasim, an associate of Showqi Al-Islambouli and the son of Said Ramadan. The group decided to focus their efforts on Addis Ababa, and that their veteran members would come together under the leadership of Islambouli.

In June 1995, they launched a failed attack against President Hosni Mubarak.

The leader of the Vanguards was believed to be Kamel Agiza, and Canadian officials allege that Mohammad Zeki Mahjoub was his second-in-command.

In December 1998, the Vanguards of Conquest issued a communique to Islamist groups calling for attacks against the United States "for its arrogance" in bombing Iraq ostensibly to distract from the Monica Lewinsky scandal.

The group is alleged to have folded into Qaeda-al-Jihad when Zawahiri merged his group with Osama bin Laden in 2001. But in April 2002, Egyptian security forces arrested 30 men for allegedly planning to revive the Vanguards.
