= Sayyed Imam Al-Sharif =

Ex al-Qaeda member

Sayyed Imam Al-Sharif (Arabic: سيد إمام الشريف, Sayyid ‘Imām ash-Sharīf; born 8 August 1950), also known as Dr. Fadl or Abd Al-Qader Bin 'Abd Al-'Aziz, has been described as a "major" figure "in the global jihad movement." He is said to be "one of Ayman Al-Zawahiri's oldest associates", and his book al-'Umda fi I'dad al-'Udda ("The Essentials of Making Ready [for Jihad]"), was used as a jihad manual in al-Qaeda training camps in Afghanistan. Fadl is reported to be one of the first members of Al Qaeda's top council.

In 2007, he criticized al-Qaeda and called for a stop to violent jihad activities both in Western and Muslim countries.

He is reported to have two wives, with four sons and two daughters between them.

== Early life and education ==
According to Human Rights Watch, Sharif was born in 1950, in the southern Egyptian province of Beni Suef seventy-five miles south of Cairo. His father was a headmaster in Beni Suef. Sharif studied the Quran, and was a hafez (i.e. he had memorized the Quran) by time he finished sixth grade. At fifteen, the Egyptian government enrolled him in a boarding school in Cairo for exceptional students. At 18 he entered medical school, and began preparing for a career as a plastic surgeon, specializing in burn injuries. He has been described as being "pious and high-minded, prideful, and rigid" at that time.

It was while studying medicine at Cairo University in the 1970s that al-Sharif met Ayman Al-Zawahiri. In 1977, Zawahiri asked al-Sharif to join his group. According to al-Sharif, Zawahiri misrepresented himself as a delegate from a group that was advised by Islamic scholars, when in fact Zawahiri was the group's emir and was not guided or advised by clerical authorities. Al-Sharif did not join Zawahiri's group.

== Egyptian Islamic Jihad ==
Following the 1981 assassination of the President of Egypt, Anwar Sadat – who had signed a peace treaty with Israel two years earlier – thousands of Egyptian Islamists were rounded up. These included Zawahiri, who was charged with smuggling weapons, but not Al-Sharif who fled the country, was tried in absentia, and convicted. Al-Sharif left Egypt for the UAE in 1982, where he worked as a doctor. He then resided in Pakistan for few weeks before leaving for Saudi Arabia, and then went back to Pakistan again, where he worked for a Kuwaiti Red Crescent hospital in Peshawar.

In Pakistan Sharif worked with Ayman al-Zawahiri to rebuild Egyptian Islamic Jihad in exile. In the mid-eighties, Sharif is thought to have become Egyptian Islamic Jihad’s emir, or chief. Al-Sharif denies this, saying that his role was merely one of offering "Sharia guidance." Zawahiri, "whose reputation had been stained by his prison confessions", handled "tactical operations." Al-Sharif impressed other jihadis with his encyclopedic knowledge of the Koran and the Hadith. According to one source, al-Sharif stayed in the background, “Ayman was the one in front, but the real leader was [al-Sharif, aka] Dr. Fadl."

=== The Essential Guide for Preparation ===
In Peshawar, Imam Al-Sharif (aka Fadl) wrote a text for jihadis to "school them in the proper way to fight battles" and preached that the "real objective was not victory over the Soviets but martyrdom and eternal salvation". This work, "The Essential Guide for Preparation," appeared in 1988 and became "one of the most important texts in the jihadis' training".

The "Guide" begins with the premise that jihad is the natural state of Islam. Muslims must always be in conflict with nonbelievers, Fadl asserts, resorting to peace only in moments of abject weakness. Because jihad is, above all, a religious exercise, there are divine rewards to be gained. He who gives money for jihad will be compensated in Heaven, but not as much as the person who acts. The greatest prize goes to the martyr. Every able-bodied believer is obligated to engage in jihad, since most Muslim countries are ruled by infidels who must be forcibly removed, in order to bring about an Islamic state. "The way to bring an end to the rulers' unbelief is armed rebellion," the "Guide" states. Some Arab governments regarded the book as so dangerous that anyone caught with a copy was subject to arrest.

In 1989, bin Laden moved from Afghanistan to Sudan along with Zawahiri and most members of Egyptian Islamic Jihad. Imam Al-Sharif, who was finishing "what he considered his masterwork, The Compendium of the Pursuit of Divine Knowledge", agreed to go at the urging of Al-Zawahiri.

=== Time in Sudan ===
"On September 10, 1993, al-Sharif took his wife and family to Sudan, where he was received on arrival by Ayman al-Zawahri, in Khartoum Airport. The relations between the two men, however, deteriorated further during al-Sharif's time in Sudan."

Sometime in the early 1990, Al-Zawahiri and Al-Sharif fell out over questions of strategy and tactics. Al-Sharif opposed Islamic Jihad's joining another Islamist group, al-Gama'a al-Islamiyya, in its terror campaign against Egyptian government and foreign tourists in Egypt saying, "this is senseless activity that will bring no benefit."

"Al-Sharif believed that violent attacks were futile, and instead advocated slow and steady infiltration into the structure of the state, but the group as a whole decided otherwise."

After two unsuccessful bombing attempts "members of Al Jihad demanded that their leader resign. Many were surprised to discover that the emir was Fadl." Al-Sharif "willingly gave up the post", and Zawahiri became the official leader as well as leader of tactical operations. Before he left Sudan, however, Al-Sharif gave a copy of his finished manuscript to Zawahiri, saying that it could be used to raise money.

=== The Compendium of the Pursuit of Divine Knowledge ===
Al-Sharif's second book was more than a thousand pages long and its author used the pseudonym Abdul Qader bin Abdul Aziz. It opens with the assertion that: "A man may enter the faith in many ways, yet be expelled from it by just one deed."

Despite Al-Sharif's complaints about the al-Gama'a al-Islamiyya bombing campaign, his book defined Islam narrowly and takfir very broadly. Among those who were not only sinners but apostates of Islam and deserving of death, according to Fadl, are the rulers of Egypt and other Arab countries, those who obey them, and those who participate in elections. “The infidel's rule, his prayers, and the prayers of those who pray behind him are invalid," Fadl decrees. His blood may be shed legally by true Muslims. "I say to Muslims in all candor that secular, nationalist democracy opposes your religion and your doctrine, and in submitting to it you leave God’s book behind." Other Muslims who are actually infidels include anyone employed by the government, the police, and the courts, and anyone who works for peaceful change instead of violent jihad. In addition, those who disagree with these ideas are also heretics and deserve to be killed.

According to Fadl, Zawahiri was delighted with the result, saying, “this book is a victory from Almighty God." But Zawahiri also edited the book before publishing it, removing "a barbed critique of the jihadi movement" and specific organizations and individuals – including al-Gama'a al-Islamiyya (the Islamic Group) with whom Zawahiri was attempting to engineer a merger – and changing the title to Guide to the Path of Righteousness for Jihad and Belief. Al-Sharif became furious with Zawahiri when he found this out, refusing to accept his apology and telling Al Hayat, "I do not know anyone in the history of Islam prior to Ayman al-Zawahiri who engaged in such lying, cheating, forgery, and betrayal of trust by transgressing against someone else's book."

== Leaving Islamic Jihad ==
=== In Yemen ===
Al-Sharif reportedly severed his ties with the Jihad, and devoted his time to his medical work and theological studies. He took his family to Sana'a following the 1994 Yemeni Civil War, then to the mountain town of Ibb, and began working in a local hospital. His son Isma`il insisted his father had by then severed all links with militant groups. He called himself Dr. Abdul Aziz al-Sharif.

=== Arrest and imprisonment ===
In the wake of the September 11, 2001 attacks on the United States, Al-Sharif was questioned by Yemen’s Political Security Organization, the Yemeni "secret police", while at work as a surgeon at the al-Shiffa Hospital in Ibb Governorate, south of Sana'a, on October 28, 2001. Shortly after he turned himself in. He was held for three years in detention in Sana'a, "without charge, without trial, and without access to an attorney."

== Criticism of Jihad movement ==
On 28 February 2004 Al-Sharif was transferred to Egypt. He was eventually transferred to Scorpion Prison, a facility inside Tora Prison where major political figures were held. There, Al-Sharif/Fadl was serving a life sentence, although according to his son his "cell" was a private room with a bath and a small kitchen, refrigerator, and a television.

During his imprisonment in Egypt he wrote Wathiqat Tarshid Al-'Aml Al-Jihadi fi Misr w'Al-'Alam ("Document of Right Guidance for Jihad Activity in Egypt and the World", also translated as "Rationalizing Jihad in Egypt and the World"). In it he proclaimed "We are prohibited from committing aggression, even if the enemies of Islam do that."

=== Rationalizing Jihad in Egypt and the World ===
In November–December 2007 this book/initiative criticized al-Qaeda and calling for a stop to jihad activities both in the West and in Muslim countries, was published in serial form in two Arab dailies, the Kuwaiti Al-Jarida and the Egyptian Al-Masri Al-Yawm. Al-Sharif claims that hundreds of Egyptian jihadists from various factions – including a majority of Islamic Jihad members – had endorsed his position. Lawrence Wright has described it as "undermin[ing] the entire intellectual framework of jihadist warfare."

==== Restrictions on jihad ====
The book Rationalizing Jihad opens with the premise that "there is nothing that invokes the anger of God and His wrath like the unwarranted spilling of blood and wrecking of property." It defines most forms of terrorism as illegal under Islamic law and restrict the possibility of holy war to extremely rare circumstances. Requirements for the lawful declaration of jihad include: a place of refuge, adequate financial resources to wage the campaign without resort to stealing or kidnapping, a means of providing for and protecting family members, properly identified enemy to avoiding killing the innocent. The "blowing up of hotels, buildings, and public transportation" is not permitted.

In addition permission must be granted by the jihadi's parents, creditors and a qualified Islamic scholar. Al-Sharif warns, "Oh, you young people, do not be deceived by the heroes of the Internet, the leaders of the microphones, who are launching statements inciting the youth while living under the protection of intelligence services, or of a tribe, or in a distant cave or under political asylum in an infidel country. They have thrown many others before you into the infernos, graves, and prisons."

Even if a person has met these requirements and is fit and capable, jihad may not be required of him. Isolation from, rather than jihad against, unbelievers is praiseworthy. Also "God permitted peace treaties and cease-fires with the infidels, either in exchange for money or without it – all of this in order to protect the Muslims, in contrast with those who push them into peril," if the enemy is much more powerful than Muslims.

Al-Sharif narrows down those who may be targets of jihad. Unjust Muslim rulers are excluded. Fadl quotes prophet Muhammad advising Muslims: "Those who rebel against the Sultan shall die a pagan death." Non-Muslims are not an acceptable target unless they are actively attacking Muslims. "There is nothing in the Sharia about killing Jews and the Nazarenes [Christians], referred to by some as the Crusaders. They are the neighbors of the Muslims ... and being kind to one's neighbors is a religious duty." Foreigners in Muslim countries may actually be Muslims or they may have been invited into the country for work, which is "a kind of treaty" and exempts them from being targets of jihad.

To Muslims living in non-Islamic countries eager to wage jihad, Fadl says,

I say it is not honorable to reside with people – even if they were nonbelievers and not part of a treaty, if they gave you permission to enter their homes and live with them, and if they gave you security for yourself and your money, and if they gave you the opportunity to work or study, or they granted you political asylum with a decent life and other acts of kindness – and then betray them, through killing and destruction. This was not in the manners and practices of the Prophet.

==== Current jihads ====
While "terrorizing the enemy is a legitimate duty" Al-Sharif believes "legitimate terror" must follow Islamic law. As for current or recent jihad, "Jihad in Afghanistan will lead to the creation of an Islamic state with the triumph of the Taliban, if God wills." In Palestine, "if it were not for the jihad in Palestine, the Jews would have crept toward the neighboring countries a long time ago," and without jihad in Iraq, "America would have moved into Syria." However the strife between Sunnis and Shiites in the jihad in Iraq is troubling because: "Harming those who are affiliated with Islam but have a different creed is forbidden."

Examples of unlawful slaughter include Al Qaeda's terrorist attacks in America, London, and Madrid, which were wrong because they were based on nationality, which is forbidden under Islam.

==== 9/11 attack ====
Al-Sharif criticizes the hijackers of 9/11 on the grounds that they "betrayed the enemy," because the visas to the U.S. they received were a kind of contract of protection.

The followers of bin Laden entered the United States with his knowledge, and on his orders double-crossed its population, killing and destroying. The Prophet — God's prayer and peace be upon him – said, ‘On the Day of Judgment, every double-crosser will have a banner up-proportionate to his treachery.'

He also criticizes the attack for the retaliation it brought forth

People hate America, and the Islamist movements feel their hatred and their impotence. Ramming America has become the shortest road to fame and leadership among the Arabs and Muslims. But what good is it if you destroy one of your enemy's buildings, and he destroys one of your countries? What good is it if you kill one of his people, and he kills a thousand of yours? ... That, in short, is my evaluation of 9/11.

=== Interview ===
In what is thought to have been an effort to dispel suspicions that the book did not represent Al-Sharif's true feelings, Muhammad Salah, the Cairo bureau chief of Al Hayat, was allowed into Tora Prison to interview Fadl. The result was published in a six-part series, where Fadl "defended the work as his own and left no doubt of his personal grudge against Zawahiri."

In the interview, Fadl labels 9/11 "a catastrophe for Muslims," because Al Qaeda's actions "caused the death of tens of thousands of Muslims—Arabs, Afghans, Pakistanis and others."

=== Criticism of Rationalizing Jihad ===
According to journalist Lawrence Wright, "Jihadist publications were filled with condemnations of Fadl's revisions." Some critics include Hani al-Sibai, a London-based Egyptian political refugee who runs the Almaqreze Centre for Historical Studies, Muhammad Khalil al-Hukayma, leader of the al-Qaeda in Egypt group.

Al-Zawahiri himself replied to al-Sharif in a nearly two hundred pages long "letter," which appeared on the Internet in March 2008. According to Diaa Rashwan, an analyst for the Al Ahram Centre for Political and Strategic Studies, in Cairo, it was "the first time in history" that al-Qaeda leadership "have responded in this way to internal dissent."

In countering Al-Sharif, Al-Zawahiri contends that "we have the right to do to the infidels what they have done to us. We bomb them as they bomb us, even if we kill someone who is not permitted to be killed." He compares the 9/11 attack to the 1998 American bombing of a pharmaceutical plant in Sudan: "I see no difference between the two operations, except that the money used to build the factory was Muslim money and the workers who died in the factory's rubble [a single night watchman] were Muslims, while the money that was spent on the buildings that those hijackers destroyed was infidel money and the people who died in the explosion were infidels."

Al-Zawahiri denies that by attacking a country which gave them visas the 9/11 attackers were "betrayed the enemy," saying, "even if the contract is based on international agreements, we are not bound by these agreements." He denies the attacks on New York, London and Madrid were un-Islamic targeting of nationalities saying "The writer speaks of violations of the Sharia, such as killing people because of their nationality, skin color, hair color, or denomination. This is another example of making accusations without evidence."

Rather than conducting terror attacks that bring devastating retaliation, "the Islamic mujahid movement was not defeated, by the grace of God; indeed, because of its patience, steadfastness, and thoughtfulness, it is headed toward victory."

Zawahiri denies Muslims living in non-Islamic countries are treated fairly, pointing out that in France, Muslim girls are forbidden to wear hijab to school, that Muslim men are prevented from marrying more than one wife, and from beating their wives, as allowed by the Sharia (according to Zawahiri).

The kidnapping or killing of tourists by jihadis has not been unislamic it has been done to send a message to their home countries (this is an opinion stated as fact): "the mujahideen don't kidnap people randomly ... We don't attack Brazilian tourists in Finland, or those from Vietnam in Venezuela."

Zawahiri also complains of a double standard when Palestinian organizations are not criticized for the same tactics and problems that Al-Sharif criticizes other jihadis. Why does al-Qaeda suffer from infighting? "Why don't you ask Hamas the same thing?" Zawahiri demands. "Isn't this a clear contradiction?" Zawahiri concedes Al Jihad has failed to overthrow the Egyptian government, then adds, "Neither has the eighty-year-old jihad kicked the occupier out of Palestine. If it is said that the jihad in Egypt put a halt to tourism and harmed the economy, the answer is that jihad in Palestine resulted in the siege of Gaza."

Al-Zawahiri's book has been published in French, in September 2008, by Editions Milelli (ISBN 978-2-916590-05-9).

== Sources ==
- Egypt's Jihad Group leader wants end to violence
- Violence won't work: how author of 'jihadists' bible' stirred up a storm
