= Mohammed Sharaf =

Emirati businessman

Dr. Mohammed Sharaf
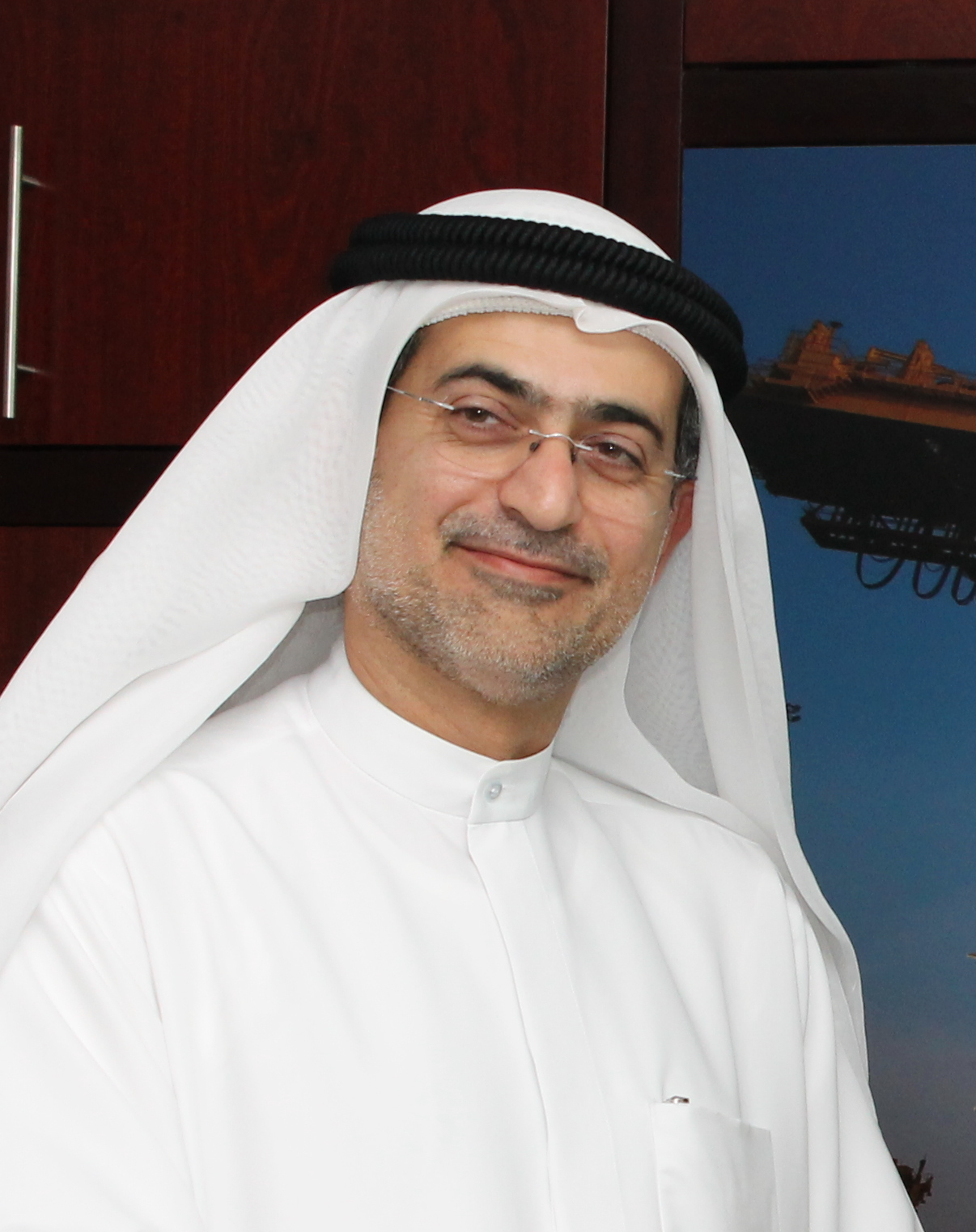
- Sharaf in March 2012
- Born: 1961 (age 63–64); Dubai, United Arab Emirates
- Education: Business Administration and Management at University of Arizona
- Occupations: Group CEO of DP World; Joint Vice Chairman of U.S.-U.A.E. Business Council
- Board member of: Member of UAE-Canada Business Council Board; Member of DP world's Nominations and Governance Committee

Mohammed Sharaf (born 1961) is an Emirati businessman, who was the Group CEO of Dubai Ports World, an Emirati ports operator. He was the Group CEO of DP World until December 2015.

== Early years and education ==
Sharaf earned a degree in business administration from the University of Arizona, Tucson in 1985.In 2018, the university awarded him an Honorary Doctor of Humane Letters. In 2018, the university awarded him an Honorary Doctor of Humane Letters.

== Career ==
Sharaf started his shipping career, at Howland Hook terminal in the Port of New York and New Jersey. He joined Dubai Ports Authority in 1992, held a number of senior positions in this company and played a central role in the development of Dubai´s container terminals at Jebel Ali and Port Rashid. In 2001 he became Managing Director of DP World UAE Region. During his mandate, Sharaf performed central roles in developing the terminals of Jeddah, Constanta, Vizag, Jebel Ali and Port Rashid. Actually Mohammed Sharaf is the DP World's Group CEO since 2005 and the DP world's company Director since 2007. In 2005 Sharaf became CEO of DP World. He retired from DP World on January 26, 2016 after he served 23 years in this company. Mohammed Sharaf was appointed Assistant Foreign Minister of Economic & Trade Affairs of the UAE in 2016.

In March 2025, he oversaw Sharaf Group’s donation of AED 3 million to the Fathers’ Endowment campaign.

In April 2025 he was listed as COO of Dubai Economic Development Corporation (DEDC), a subsidiary under the Dubai Department of Economy & Tourism.
