= Egyptian Islamic Jihad =

Terrorist group active since the late 1970s

- الجهاد الإسلامي المصري
- Leaders: Muhammad Abd al-Salam Faraj (executed) (1979–1982); Ayman al-Zawahiri (1982–2001)
- Dates active: 1979–2001
- Merged into: al-Qaeda
- Headquarters: Egypt, then Afghanistan (unknown after 2001)
- Active regions: Worldwide, but especially in: Egypt; Afghanistan; Yemen; Sudan; Lebanon; United Kingdom
- Ideology: Qutbism; Sunni Islamism; Anti-communism; Anti-Zionism

The Egyptian Islamic Jihad (EIJ; Arabic: الجهاد الإسلامي المصري), formerly called simply Islamic Jihad (Arabic: الجهاد الإسلامي) and the Liberation Army for Holy Sites, originally referred to as al-Jihad, and then the Jihad Group, or the Jihad Organization, was an Egyptian Islamist group active from the late 1970s until its 2001 merger with al-Qaeda. It was long considered an affiliate of al-Qaeda and under worldwide embargo by the United Nations. It was also banned by several individual governments worldwide. The group is a proscribed terrorist organization in the United Kingdom under the Terrorism Act 2000.

The organization's original primary goal was to overthrow the Egyptian government and replace it with an Islamic state. Later it broadened its aims to include attacking American and Israeli interests in Egypt and abroad. Since September 1999 the leadership of the group has also allied itself to the ‘global Jihad’ ideology expounded by Osama Bin Laden that has threatened Western interests.

In June 2001, al-Qaeda and the EIJ (which had been associated with each other for many years) merged into "Qaeda al-Jihad". However, the UN states that there was a split in the organization when the merger was announced.

Following the Egyptian Revolution of 2011, former leaders of the group in Egypt formed a political party, called the Islamic Party, which became a member of the Anti-Coup Alliance following the 2013 Egyptian coup d'etat.

== History ==
Al-Jihad or "Tanzim al-Jihad" was formed in 1980 from the merger of two clusters of Islamist groups: a Cairo branch, under Mohammed Abdul-Salam Farag, and a Saidi (Upper Egypt) branch under Karam Zuhdi. Farag wrote the 1980 book al-Faridah al-Ghaiba (The Neglected Obligation), setting forth the standards for EIJ, of which 500 copies were printed.

After the assassination of Egyptian president Anwar Sadat, the Egyptian government succeeded in rounding up the membership of Tanzim al-Jihad, but "was rather lenient in the ensuing trial". In prison, the Cairenes and Saidis reverted into two factions; the Cairo militants later becoming the Egyptian Islamic Jihad, and the Saidis later forming the al-Gama'a al-Islamiyya, or the Islamic Group. According to Zawahiri, the EIJ was "different from the Takfir wal Hijra group as we do not consider people infidels because of their sins. And we are different from the Muslim Brotherhood because sometimes they do not oppose the government".

The leader of the Cairo militants was Abbud al-Zumar, "a onetime army intelligence officer serving a life sentence for his part in the plot to kill Sadat". This faction, the Islamic Jihad, "was small and tightly disciplined".

Most of the middle-rank members were discharged from prison after only three years and fled to Pakistan and Afghanistan to help the mujahideen there and escape persecution at home.

=== Pakistan and Afghanistan ===
In the mid-1980s, in Peshawar (Pakistan), the militants reconstituted themselves as the Egyptian Islamic Jihad, "with very loose ties to their nominal imprisoned leader, Abbud al-Zumar". A physician by the name of Sayyed Imam Al-Sharif or "Dr. Fadl" was head of EIJ for some time, although eventually, Ayman al-Zawahiri, "whose leadership style was autocratic," would take over. During this time EIJ became more extreme, with, for example, Dr. Fadl emphasizing the importance of takfir and execution of apostates, which he argued should include those who registered to vote, since this was a violation of God's sovereignty over governance.

It was also at this time that some saw "the Egyptians" of the EIJ begin to exert an influence on Osama bin Laden, who at the time was known as a wealthy and well-connected fundraiser for the jihad in Afghanistan. Egyptian filmmaker Essam Deraz, "bin Laden's first biographer," met bin Laden in the "Lion's Den" training camp in Afghanistan and complained that the Egyptians "formed a barrier" around bin Laden and "whenever he tried to speak confidentially to bin Laden, the Egyptians would surround the Saudi and drag him into another room". One of those who complained of being elbowed aside was a former mentor of bin Laden Abdullah Azzam, the original exponent and organizer of global jihad on behalf of the Afghan mujahideen.

In 1991, EIJ broke with al-Zumar and al-Zawahiri took control of the leadership. At this point, Marc Sageman (a former foreign service officer who was based in Islamabad from 1987 to 1989), says "the EIJ became a free-floating network without any real ties to its original society or to its surrounding society".

=== Sudan ===
al-Jihad (EIJ) had a blind-cell structure, meaning members in one group did not know the identities or activities of those in another so that if one member were captured they would not be able to endanger the whole organization. However, Egyptian authorities captured the membership director of EIJ, the one member who had all the other members' names. The database in his computer listed every member's address, aliases, and potential hideouts. Al-Jihad leader al-Zawahiri bitterly lamented "the government newspapers" elation over “the arrest of 800 members of the al-Jihad group without a single shot being fired".

In August 1993, al-Jihad unsuccessfully attempted to kill the Egyptian Interior Minister, Hassan Al Alfi, who was leading a crackdown on Islamic militants. A bomb-laden motorcycle exploded next to the minister's car, fatally wounding Nazih Nushi Rashed and killing Tarek Abdel-Nabi (Dia al-Deen) instantly. The attack marked the first time Sunni Islamists had made use of suicide in terrorism, a technique made famous by Shia Hezbollah in Lebanon. It is "likely that the notion of suicide bombing" was inspired by Hezbollah as al-Zawahiri had been to Iran to raise money, and had sent his underling Ali Mohamed, "among others, to Lebanon to train with Hezbollah".

A few months later in November, al-Jihad made another bombing attempt, this time to kill Egypt's prime minister, Atef Sidqi. The car bomb exploded close to a girls' school in Cairo as the minister was driven past. The minister, protected by his armored car, was not hurt, but the explosion injured 21 people and killed a young schoolgirl, Shayma Abdel-Halim. Unfortunately for al-Jihad this bombing was preceded by two years of terror by a larger terror group (al-Gama'a al-Islamiyya) that had killed 240, and the patience of the Egyptian public had run short. "Little Shayma's death captured people's emotions as nothing else had" and "when her coffin was borne through the streets of Cairo, people cried, 'Terrorism is the enemy of God!'" A harsh police crackdown followed and 280 EIJ members were arrested, with 6 eventually given a death sentence.

EIJ's longtime association with al-Qaeda became closer at this time when "most" of its members were reported to have gone "on the al-Qaeda payroll". The leader of EIJ hoped this would be a temporary measure but later confided to one of his chief assistants that joining with bin Laden had been "the only solution to keeping the Jihad organization abroad alive."

==== Mubarak assassination attempt ====
In June 1995, another failed assassination attempt caused yet a greater setback. Operating from its exile base in Sudan, EIJ joined forces with the Egyptian al-Gama'a al-Islamiyya and Sudanese intelligence in an attempt to kill Egyptian President Hosni Mubarak while he was in Ethiopia for a conference of the Organization of African Unity. Sayyed Imam Al-Sharif has claimed that Zawahiri was an agent for Sudanese intelligence services. The leader of the plot was "Mustafa Hamza, a senior Egyptian member of the Al-Qaeda and commander to the military branch of the Islamic Group". The plotters had been planning the attack for more than a year and even married local women in Ethiopia. They received assistance from Sudanese intelligence services, which smuggled weapons into their embassy in Ethiopia.

Their hope was to decapitate the Egyptian government thereby eliminating the "iron grip" of the state security services, and creating a power vacuum which Islamists could then fill. Unfortunately for this plan, the attack was foiled by a malfunctioning grenade launcher and Mubarak’s bulletproof limousine.

==== Expulsion from Sudan ====
Back in Egypt, Mubarak launched a ruthless campaign to crush anyone involved in Islamist terrorism, but in Sudan the EIJ had even worse troubles.

In 1994, in a pamphlet written by Al-Zawahri, he alleges that, Ahmad Salama Mabruk's 17-year-old son Musab, as well as the 15-year-old son Ahmed of Mohammed Sharaf, were captured by the Egyptian General Intelligence Directorate and sexually abused. They were blackmailed with videotape of the sodomy until they agreed to act as informants against their fathers' group. Musab went through his father's files and photocopied them for the Egyptians, but the Sudanese intelligence service saw the covert meetings and alerted al-Jihad, recommending that they treat the boys leniently if they confessed. al-Zawahiri convened a Sharia court, where Musab confessed he had been given explosives by the Egyptians which he was told to detonate at the next Shura council meeting. They were each found guilty of "sodomy, treason, and attempted murder", and sentenced to death by firing squad. The trial, and the execution, were filmed and copies of the film were distributed by al-Jihad.

When the Sudanese found out about the executions in its jurisdiction, al-Zawahiri and the rest of EIJ were ordered to leave the Sudan. It was a devastating blow to the group. "In Zawahiri's hands, al-Jihad had splintered into angry and homeless gangs".

bin Laden was also weakened by this failed operation. The core of his al-Qaeda group was made up of members of Islamic Jihad. Because of Sudan's collaboration in the plot, the United Nations voted to impose sanctions on the country. To rehabilitate itself in the international community, the Sudanese government pressured bin Laden to leave the country. Bin Laden and many EIJ returned to war-torn Afghanistan having lost many members and almost all of bin Laden's assets.

On November 19, 1995, EIJ bombed the Egyptian embassy in Islamabad killing 16 and wounding 60. The attack served as a prototype for future attacks by its sister organization al-Qaeda, such as the 1998 bombings of American embassies in Africa.

=== Albania ===
According to journalist Lawrence Wright, based on testimony given at the trial of the Albanian cell members in the late 1990s or early 2000s, EIJ membership had dwindled to 40 members outside Egypt, and none at all inside the country where "the movement had been eradicated".

In 1998, three al-Jihad members were arrested in Albania, and the United States intervened to ensure they were extradited to Egypt to face charges. In Afghanistan Zawahiri wrote the 1998 fatwa for the "International Islamic Front for Jihad Against Jews and Crusaders," calling for the killing of Americans and their allies, both civilian and military, which was signed by representatives of several jihadi organizations, including EIJ. In August 1998, Issam Abdel-Tawab was extradited to Egypt from Bulgaria.

Dissent among EIJ members to this change of direction and abandonment of the taking over Egypt as the group's primary goal was so strong that "in the end, Zawahiri pledged to resign if the members failed to endorse his actions. The organization was in such disarray because of arrests and defections, and so close to bankruptcy, that the only choice was to follow Zawahiri or abandon al-Jihad". One of those who did abandon al-Jihad was Zawahiri's own brother Muhammed, the military commander of EIJ.

=== Merger with al-Qaeda ===
In June 2001, Al-Qaeda and the Egyptian Islamic Jihad merged into an entity formally called jamaa'at Qa'idat al-Jihad, with the leadership of the EIJ having "the majority" – six of nine seats – "of al-Qaeda's ruling council (shura)." However, Sayyed Imam Al-Sharif has claimed that only 9 people from the organization, including Zawahiri, actually joined Al-Qaeda.

Consequently, it is often considered synonymous with al-Qaeda (for example, by the US Treasury Department), although some refer to it as a separate organization with al-Zawahiri as its leader and global jihad's main ideologist.

== Activities ==
The organization specialized in armed attacks against high-level Egyptian Government personnel, including cabinet ministers, and car-bombings against the official US and Egyptian facilities. The original Jihad was responsible for the attempted assassinations of Interior Minister Hassan al-Alfi in August 1993 and Prime Minister Atef Sedky in November 1993. Egyptian Jihad and the rival armed group launched a wave of violence against Egypt's secular government in 1992, a campaign they only abandoned at the end of the decade. Nearly 1300 people died in the unrest, including policemen and government officials. It is responsible for the Egyptian Embassy bombing in Islamabad, Pakistan in 1995. In 1998 a planned attack against the US Embassy in Albania was thwarted by a roundup of suspects who are now called the Returnees from Albania.

== Leadership ==
Although Ayman al-Zawahiri was "the one in front", Al-Sharif was the actual leader. Nabil Na'eem was the leader of the group from 1988 until 1992.

The al-Zawahiri faction subsequently formed an alliance with Al-Qaeda leading over time to the effective merger of the two groups operations inside Afghanistan. Even though al-Zawahiri was frequently referred to as a 'lieutenant' or 'second in command' of Al-Qaeda, this description is misleading, as it implies a hierarchical relationship.

The modern Al-Qaeda organization is the combination of bin Laden's financial resources with al-Zawahiri's ideological and operational leadership.

== External aid ==
The extent of its aid from outside of Egypt is not known. The Egyptian Government claimed that both Iran and Osama bin Laden support the Islamic Jihad. It also may obtain some funding through various Islamic nongovernmental organizations, cover businesses, and criminal acts.

Unlike other militant counterparts, EIJ was noted for condemning only the government as apostate, and seeking to recruit soldiers, reporters and government workers who were untainted by jahiliyya. Iraq agreed in March 1993 to renew relations with the group.

== See also ==
- Sayyed Imam Al-Sharif
- Hani al-Sibai
- Terrorism in Egypt
- Returnees from Albania
- Ali Mohammed
- Abu Ayyub al-Masri
- Abu Khayr al-Masri
