= L'Houssaine Kherchtou =

- Born: 15 May 1964 (age 61); Morocco
- Other names: Abu Zaid al Maghrebi, Abu Talal
- Occupation(s): Cook, militant, state witness
- Children: Three daughters

L'Houssaine Kherchtou (born 15 May 1964) was an early initiate in al-Qaeda, joining the militant group in 1991. In 2000, he pleaded guilty to conspiracy to murder, but as he was the chief witness against four of his former colleagues, all of whom were subsequently sentenced to life imprisonment, his charges were withdrawn and he entered the witness protection program.

Testifying in New York in the summer of 2001, he noted that al-Qaeda had trained suicide pilots to fly planes into buildings. Together with Jamal al-Fadl, his testimony forms the bulk of the information known about the early years of the Islamist group.

== Life ==
Following three years of catering school, Kherchtou spent three months in northwestern France in 1989, before making his way to Corsica and eventually Italy as an illegal immigrant. Later, he found the Islamic Cultural Institute in Milan, where he was encouraged by Anwar Shaaban to travel to Afghanistan. During his time in Italy, he managed to add Italian to his repertoire of languages, which included French, English, Arabic and Berber.

In 1991 he obtained a visa to visit Pakistan, ostensibly to attend a Tablighi Jamaat conference with his veterinarian friend Abu Ahmed el Masri, through the embassy in Rome. He disembarked in Karachi and flew to Islamabad, and onward to Peshawar; there he stayed in Bait al-Ansar before being spirited across the Afghan border through Mirahshah and enrolled in the al-Farouq camp. He later identified two trainers of the camp, Shuayb and Mushin Musa Matwalli Atwah.

== Joining al-Qaeda ==
We are young, we don't know anything: let's go, it's an adventure

— Kherchtou, describing his decisions

Upon returning to Peshawar from al-Farouq, Kherchtou was approached and agreed to swear a bayat to Osama bin Laden's fledgling new group, al-Qaeda. He fought in the Afghan Civil War for two months, before being moved to train new Mujahideen at the Abu Bakr Siddique camp, which he has contradictorily placed in Hayatabad, Pakistan and Khost, Afghanistan.

In 1993, he was sent to Somalia, and then followed al-Qaeda to their base in Sudan.

In 1994, he was asked to attend a flight school in Nairobi in preparation to become Osama bin Laden's personal pilot. There, he met Anas al-Libi, who came to his apartment with two friends, two laptop computers and photography equipment. Kherchtou's apartment was transformed into a dark room where they developed photographs of potential Kenyan targets for bombing. After receiving his pilot license, he returned to the Sudan in December 1995, but was appalled to find that his wife, heavily pregnant and in need of $500 for a cesarean section, was begging on the streets for money to allow her entrance to Khartoum's general hospital. Kherchtou went to Sayyid al-Masri and asked him to cover his wife's medical bills, and was upset upon being informed there was no money to spare and al-Masri suggested he take her to a Muslim charitable hospital for free treatment. He angrily demanded to know "if it was your wife or your daughter, you would take her there", and later recounted that he was angry enough he would have shot al-Masri if he had a gun at the time.

Following the 1994 execution of the sons of Ahmad Salama Mabruk and Mohammed Sharaf for betraying Egyptian Islamic Jihad, the militants were ordered to leave the Sudan. Kherchtou disobeyed orders to relocate to Afghanistan, claiming he was concerned about the education his children would receive in such a country, although he is also believed to have still felt snubbed after being refused financial compensation for his wife's operation, and subsequently "began to drift away" from al-Qaeda.

== Move to Kenya, arrest, testimony ==
In June 1998, still living in Khartoum despite al-Qaeda's exodus, Kherchtou claims he decided to pursue an unrelated career in tourism. He moved back to Kenya and developed a relationship with Ali Mohamed and by happenstance, he claims he ran into "Haroun" and "Ahmed", both of whom he had known during his time in al-Qaeda. The three of them began to meet through the Mercy International Relief Agency offices. During this time, Kherchtou was being courted by MI6 and Moroccan intelligence to act as an informant. At the same time, however, he was bribing Kenyan border officials to allow him to smuggle large amounts of cash into the country for al-Qaeda. He also accompanied American double-agent Ali Mohamed to Senegal, where the pair of them scouted French facilities as possible bombing targets.

He was arrested as he tried to leave Nairobi four days after the 1998 United States embassy bombings, and handed over to the British. They dubbed him "Joe the Moroccan", and set him free with a promise to travel to Khartoum and be an informant; although he went to Sudan, he never called them back or gave them any further information.

When Jack Cloonan of the FBI learned that the British had a firm grasp of Kherchtou's whereabouts, he concocted a plan to get him out of Sudan and back to his native Morocco, where he could be renditioned to the United States. He had the Moroccan government issue notice that the immigration status of Kherchtou's children had been called into question and he was needed in-person to resolve the issue. Kherchtou flew immediately to Rabat, where he was met by authorities who took him to a "grand house with stables out back, gazelles bouncing in the background, palm trees, three-course meals..." and he dined with the FBI, cooperating fully and giving them all the information he had on al-Qaeda over ten days of questioning. He agreed to be flown back to the United States to testify against the four suspected al-Qaeda members in custody following the embassy bombings, after Cloonan suggested to him that he "pray on" the matter and then give his decision.

In his testimony, he made the only known reference to an "Abu Ayub al-Iraqi" whom he claimed was the head of al-Qaeda's military branch until 1991, when the commonly presumed first chief Abu Ubaidah al-Banshiri took over. He also suggested that Khalid al-Fawwaz was much more central than previously believed, claiming that "Abu Omar al-Sebai" had overseen the Abu Bakr Siddique camp. He also suggested that al-Qaeda relied on diamond smuggling to raise funds for their operations. He was accused of "contradicting" himself after he said he knew that Wadih el-Hage was a member of al-Qaeda, but under cross-examination admitting he had told the British intelligence agents that he didn't know el-Hage's allegiance two years earlier, and telling the FBI the same thing only six months prior to the trial.

Some have questioned how honest he was about his own role in the bombings as he freely implicated everybody but himself.
