= Abu Ubaidah al-Banshiri =

Egyptian al-Qaeda member

Ali Amin al-Rashidi
- Nicknames: Ubaidah al-Banshiri, Adel Habib, Karim, Jalal
- Born: May 1950; Cairo, Egypt
- Died: May 21, 1996 (aged 46) Coast of Mwanza, Tanzania
- Allegiance: Maktab al-Khidamat al-Qaeda
- Service years: 1983-1996
- Rank: Military Commander
- Conflicts: Soviet–Afghan War; Battle of Jaji; Battle of Mogadishu

Abu Ubaidah al-Banshiri (Arabic: أبو عبيدة البنشيري; May 1950 – 21 May 1996) was the nom de guerre of Ali Amin al-Rashidi, was a founding member of al-Qaeda and served as the groups first military commander. He was known within the group as the "most capable and popular leaders".

He was the head of al-Qaeda's African presence, overseeing both funding and military operations in the continent, and second in command of the whole organization, below Osama bin Laden.

== Biography ==
Al-Rashidi was born in May 1950 in Cairo, and served in the national police force on Egypt. His future brother-in-law was a member of al-Jihad, a precursor to Egyptian Islamic Jihad, and had participated in the assassination of Egyptian President Anwar El Sadat. In the aftermath, Egypt began a crackdown on Islamic extremism and al-Rashidi was briefly arrested for allegedly being part of al-Jihad and was fired from his position in the police. In 1983 he married Hafsah Sa’d Rashwan, the sister of Muhammad Abd al-Salam Faraj wife. Shortly after their marriage, the couple moved to Jeddah, Saudi Arabia, living in a home owned by Osama bin Laden. He then travelled to Peshawar, Pakistan to train with the Arab Mujahedeen fighting against the Soviet occupation of Afghanistan.

It is as if 100 years were added to my life when I came to Afghanistan

— Abu Ubaidah al-Banshiri

While there he met Ayman al-Zawahiri, head of Egyptian Islamic Jihad, who introduced al-Rashidi to Osama bin Laden, then serving as the chief financer of Maktab al-Khidamat, who was so favorably impressed that he placed him in charge of the training camps for the Afghan Arabs. He also fostered cooperation between the Arab and Afghan Mujahedeen, and was a compatriot of Ahmed Shah Massoud. Together with bin Laden, al-Rashidi lead around 50 Arab volunteers against a Soviet siege in the Paktia province. During the Battle of Jaji, forces under the command of bin Laden and al-Rashidi held out for a week to protect a mujahedeen supply route. Al-Rashidi was wounded after being shot in the leg, and his forces eventually retreated after being overrun by Soviet forces, but the battle was seen as a great victory by bin Laden and his forces, with al-Rashidi being celebrated as a war hero as well.

=== Al-Qaeda ===
While still in Afghanistan, in August 1988, he attended a meeting with bin Laden, Mamdouh Mahmud Salim, and Wa'el Julaidan. The men were disappointed with Makteb al-Khidamat and discussed qualities of a possible new organization to replace it. In late 1989, al-Qaeda welcomed in its first recruits at a training camp in the Paktia province of Afghanistan that Al-Rashidi managed. Osama bin Laden, Abu Ayoub al-Iraqi, Jamal al-Fadl, and al-Rashidis second in command, Mohammed Atef, were present as well for a meeting in which they discussed al-Qaeda taking jihad outside of Afghanistan.

In 1990, al-Qaeda leadership had decided to move their operation to Sudan, seeking to capitalize on the ascent of the National Islamic Front to power in the country after the 1989 coup. The group first travelled from Pakistan in 1992 to Yemen for 10 months before settling in Omdurman, Sudan. During this time, al-Rashidi was placed in charge of the al-Qaeda cell in Yemen. He was also made field commander for all operations in the Horn of Africa.

Along with his role as military leader, al-Rashidi also established a number of businesses and charities that acted as fronts for al-Qaeda. A fishing business in Mombasa, Kenya was established in 1994, and a business was set up in Nairobi importing automobiles from the United Arab Emirates. From 1993 until 1997, al-Rashidi and Wadih el-Hage, bin Ladens secretary who was serving as al-Qaeda's senior facilitator in Kenya, established a number of gem, gold, and tanzanite companies in Kenya. The two men were also associated with the NGO's Mercy International Relief Agency and Help Africa People.

At some point al-Banshiri acquired either Dutch citizenship or forged Dutch papers. Prior to 1996, al-Rashidi, Mohammed Atef and Yaseen al-Iraqi aided Enaam Arnaout in purchasing AK-47s and mortar rounds from a Pashtun tribesman named Hajjji Ayoub, and they were subsequently delivered in large trucks to the Jawr and Jihad Wahl training camps.

In spring 1993, al-Rashidi held a meeting with Osama bin Laden during which both agreed that al-Qaeda would target American forces present in Somalia for Operation Gothic Serpent. Following a recon mission into the country by Mohammed Atef, al-Rashidi ordered a portion of the Sudanese cell of al-Qaeda to go to Somalia and offer weapons, training and assistance to any Somalian forces opposed to the UN presence. He also strongly advocated for the eventual attacks on the U.S. embassies in Kenya and Tanzania.

== Death ==
On 21 May 1996 Ali Amin al-Rashidi drowned in Lake Victoria after the ferry he was travelling on sank. When the news broke that the ferry MV Bukoba had sunk, al-Qaeda sent Fazul Abdullah Mohammed and Wadih el-Hage to the scene to verify that al-Banshiri had drowned, and had not been murdered. A source has claimed that al-Rashidi was attempting to obtain material for a dirty bomb when he drowned and when the brother of Ayman al Zawahiri had informed al-Rashidis wife of his death, he told her that he was making preparations for an attack when he drowned.

Al-Rashidi was succeeded as al-Qaeda's military commander by Mohammed Atef, who had been his protegee. Al-Banshiri's senior role in East Africa was taken over, at least in part, by Abdullah Ahmed Abdullah.

A poem entitled "Tears in the Eyes of Time" was written about al-Banshiri, commemorating him among the greatest of the "fallen mujahideen". Al-Zawahiri recited the poem in his January 2006 internet broadcast.
