= Battle of Jaji =

1987 battle during the Soviet–Afghan war

- Part of the Soviet–Afghan War
Date	May 12 – June 4, 1987
Location	Paktia, Afghanistan
Result	MAK victory: Soviet/Afghan government failure to capture the MAK base

Belligerents
Soviet Union; Republic of Afghanistan	Maktab al-Khidamat; Supported by: Afghan mujahideen Pakistan

Commanders and leaders
(Soviet Union) Boris Gromov (Afghanistan) Mohammed Najibullah	Abdullah Azzam; Osama bin Laden (WIA); Abu Ubayda (WIA); Abu Hafs

Units involved
Afghan Army: 12th Division; 36th Regiment	

Strength
(Soviet Union) ~200 Paratroopers (Afghanistan) Unknown number	Unknown

Casualties and losses
(Soviet Union) Unknown (Afghanistan) Unknown	13 killed

The Battle of Jaji was fought during the Soviet–Afghan War between Soviet Army units, and their allies of the Democratic Republic of Afghanistan against Maktab al-Khidamat in Paktia Province. This battle occurred in May 1987, during the first stage of withdrawal of Soviet forces from Afghanistan. The objective was to relieve a besieged garrison at Ali Sher, and cut off supply lines to the Mujahideen from Pakistan. The battle is primarily known for the participation of the Arab foreign fighter and future founder of al-Qaeda, Osama bin Laden, who acquired his reputation as a "divine" jihadist warrior as a result of the Mujahideen victory during this battle. Bin Laden led a group of some 50 Arab foreign fighters during this battle, of which at least 13 were killed in action.

== Background ==
In December 1979, the Soviet Union invaded Afghanistan to support its struggling communist regime, sparking the Soviet–Afghan War. This intervention caused widespread outrage in the Muslim world. Osama bin Laden, a scion of the wealthy Saudi Binladin Group, went to Pakistan in early 1980 to support the Afghan resistance against the Soviet invaders, considering it a jihad. However, he did not enter Afghanistan until many years later. In October 1984, Abdullah Yusuf Azzam, a Palestinian Salafist also angered by the Soviet invasion, established Maktab al-Khadamat (MaK). The group aimed to coordinate logistics and support for the Afghan resistance from Pakistan. Initially bin Laden agreed to fund the group, with the understanding that the money would directly support the mujahideen on the front lines. Together, Azzam and bin Laden's group started publishing Jihad magazine, a monthly Arabic-language publication focusing on Arab efforts to aid the resistance. The magazine proved to be a potent recruitment tool, attracting Muslims worldwide to join the Afghan war, effectively transforming it into a global jihad.

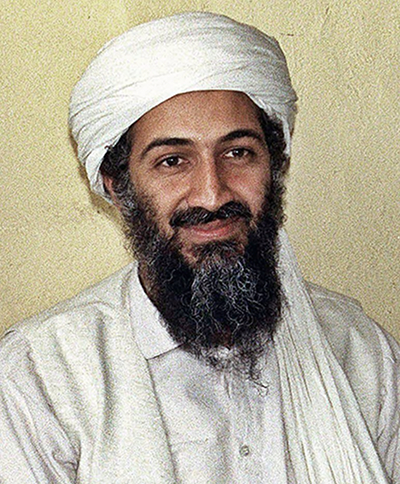
Osama bin Laden

In 1986, MaK relocated most of its operations to Sadda and initiated a training program to train fighters to wage jihad inside Afghanistan. However, the program was a failure, with poorly prepared brigades being turned away from the battlefield by the Afghans. This disillusioned bin Laden, leading him to withdraw from the group and start his own training program within Afghanistan, rather than in neighboring Pakistan.

Bin Laden selected the mountainous region of Jaji as the site for his operations, which he named "Masada," meaning "the Lion's Den." He strategically positioned the base close to Soviet positions, intending to confront the enemy head-on and hoping that the Soviets would attack it. Bin Laden became disillusioned with training programs run from Pakistan and decided to establish his own base inside Afghanistan. The construction of the Masada symbolized his move toward autonomy in organizing jihadist fighters and reducing dependence on Pakistani facilities.

Drawing on his construction expertise and his immense available resources, bin Laden constructed a series of fortifications in the vicinity of Jaji. Some Arabs supporting the Afghan resistance in Pakistan tried to dissuade bin Laden from focusing solely on training non-Afghan fighters, fearing that it would alienate the Afghans.

Nevertheless, bin Laden remained undeterred. He equipped his Arab fighters with Kalashnikov rifles and rocket-propelled grenades, initiating small-scale attacks against the Soviets. Although his Arab fighters suffered immediate casualties, it was perceived as a positive outcome by the jihadists seeking martyrdom.

By May 1987, bin Laden had built up his base to the extent that it finally caught Soviet attention, and they launched an attack on it on 12 May. However, this was not only an attack against bin Laden's base, but a broad Soviet offensive to relieve a Soviet fort in the area, and the offensive included attacks against many other mujahideen groups in the area.

== Battle ==
The mujahideen army was estimated from as low as fifty members, to numbering "in the thousands", having drawn recruits from the surrounding area, Osama bin Laden led the defense of the Masada compound, supported by his two key commanders, Abu Ubayda and Abu Hafs. Abdullah Azzam also participated in the battle, despite his private misgivings about bin Laden's separate Arab military unit. Additional individuals involved in the battle were Azzam's son Hutaifa, Abu Khalil who was in charge of keeping up a steady barrage of mortars, Tamim al-Adnani, a figure known as "Abu al-Hasan," tenatively identified as Wael Julaidan, and Enaam Arnaout who identified himself to the Arab press as "Abu Mahmoud, from Syria", who was photographed alongside bin Laden and quoted as saying that the Soviets had dropped napalm, destroying the trees that the mujahideen had hoped to use for fortifications.

Apart from the Arab fighters, there were also a few jihadists from the wider Muslim world who took part in the battle. One of them was Mukhlas, an Indonesian who was later indicted in the 2002 Bali bombings.

In addition to the foreign fighters, Afghan forces from all seven of the resistance parties were part of the larger action. Among the Afghan leaders were Jalaluddin Haqqani, Mohammed Anwar, and Abdul Rasul Sayyaf, whose experienced troops were carrying Stinger and Blowpipe missiles that threatened Soviet gunships.

The mujahideen al-Masada ("Lion's Den") compound had been constructed by bin Laden, in order to have a training facility that didn't rely on Pakistan. After relieving the Soviet garrison, Ali Sher, the Soviets launched an attack against bin Laden's base in Jaji, deploying approximately 200 Soviet Airborne Troops and Spetsnaz forces supported by the Soviet-backed Afghan Army and Afghan tribal militias.

The Soviets began their attack against the Masada compound with heavy bombardment, using cluster bombs, helicopter gunships, and heavy artillery. The attacks involved the use of napalm bombs that caused such devastation that the trees burned even in the pouring rain. Witnessing the extensive bombardments and destruction, Azzam began weeping as he fervently prayed for the safety of the fighters. The bombardments were carried out daily until June.

During the battle, Abu Ubayda and Abu Hafs both led raids that encircled the Soviet siege, ambushing them outside the encampment. In one particular instance, Abu Ubayda and a group of fighters swiftly maneuvered over the mountains, surpassing the point where the Soviets had landed. This strategic move trapped the Soviets from multiple sides, leaving them surrounded. As the Soviets tried to advance, they found themselves in a dire situation and reportedly suffered significant losses in the ensuing fighting. In a separate raid, Abu Ubayda sustained a gunshot wound to his leg.

On 25 May, a Soviet warplane flying above bin Laden's training camp was targeted by a separate group of Afghan fighters. The plane was hit and shattered into fragments, ultimately crashing close to bin Laden's camp. This was seen as a key moment in the battle by bin Laden and his Arab fighters, particularly due to its occurrence on the 27th day of Ramadan. This day is regarded as highly sacred in the Muslim calendar, believed to be a day when destinies are determined and the gates of heaven are opened. Bin Laden and his men did not see it as a coincidence that the Soviet plane had been shot down on this particular day.

Amidst the relentless Soviet bombardments, bin Laden grew concerned that his men couldn't hold out much longer if they remained. As a result, he made the decision to abandon the al-Masada compound. When one of his men objected, bin Laden responded by pulling at the dissenter's beard while yelling and scolding. Bin Laden later justified this by claiming the dissenter was "possessed."

To prevent the Soviets from seizing anything from the camp, the Arabs deliberately destroyed large parts of it. They rolled their cannons into the ravines and buried their automatic weapons. As a final measure, one of the men threw a grenade into the pantry.

Bin Laden and his men headed to the camp of the Afghan mujahideen commander, Abdul Sayyaf. Sayyaf was furious upon learning about the abandonment of the al-Masada compound. Although he had previously been dismissive of the idea of establishing a permanent base in the area, he changed his stance after recognizing its fortification and strategic value. Sayyaf swiftly countermanded bin Laden's order, instructing the Arabs to return and providing some of his own Afghan warriors to assist them.

Embarrassed and fatigued, the Arab fighters returned to the al-Masada compound in groups of five or ten. By dawn, a force consisting of 20 Arabs and 30 Afghans had returned to the camp. Despite being the end of Ramadan, the fighters had practically nothing to eat since the kitchen had been destroyed. Bin Laden eventually arrived accompanied by a group of 10 more Arab fighters.

On 29 May, in what is also referred to as the "Battle of 1 Shawwal," a group of around 25 Arab fighters fought off a much larger group of Soviet commandos. Soviet commandos entered the Masada compound but were repelled by the Arabs and a handful of Afghan supporters. In the heat of the battle, there were only nine mujahideen defenders left alive inside the compound, but the Soviets did not realize this weakness and failed to take advantage of the situation before reinforcements arrived.

After handing over the al-Masada compound to his Afghan allies, bin Laden led his men to a vantage point among the trees, where they could observe a Soviet force just seventy meters away. Bin Laden tried to signal his men to advance, but they couldn't hear him. In an attempt to reach them, he climbed a leafless tree, immediately drawing enemy fire. One rocket-propelled Soviet grenade came perilously close to hitting bin Laden, passing him by just before exploding seconds later.

Bin Laden and his men found themselves pinned down the entire day due to relentless enemy mortar fire. In the midst of the heavy Soviet bombardment, bin Laden suddenly fell asleep. While bin Laden's nap has often been portrayed in Jihadi propaganda as evidence of holy grace and peaceful steadfastness under fire, journalist Lawrence Wright suggests that bin Laden, most likely, simply fainted, considering his known struggle with low blood pressure, which often made him feel lightheaded. By 5:00 in the afternoon, the Arab fighters managed to outflank the Soviet forces, who opted for a retreat due to the lack of available air support at that moment.

The Arab fighters were ultimately ordered to abandon the al-Masada compound to their Afghan allies after taking severe losses during this encounter. This led to some tensions between the Arabs and the Afghans.

In the end, the mujahideen successfully held their complex system of tunnels and caves named al-Masada just outside the village of Jaji, near the Pakistani border, from Soviet capture.

This battle later became famous due to the participation of bin Laden, whose force of 50 Arabs fought alongside the Afghan rebels. Following the skirmish, Abu Ubayda presented bin Laden with a small AK-74s he had recovered from a dead Soviet soldier. Bin Laden kept this rifle as a trophy, consistently wearing it on his shoulder thereafter.

The battle lasted for one week and resulted in the deaths of at least 13 Arab fighters and around 70 Afghan fighters. Despite the pivotal role played by the Arab fighters, the majority of the fighting was conducted by the mujahideen forces under the command of Abdul Rasul Sayyaf. A number of Soviet-aligned Afghan soldiers defected to the mujahideen, which further weakened Soviet efforts and highlighted the growing morale crisis among their local allies. After the battle, Sayyaf assumed control of the al-Masada compound, utilizing it strategically as an outpost overseeing a vital caravan supply route. Still, the event became a landmark for the Arab fighters, solidifying their legend and jihadist legitimacy. Bin Laden himself sustained a foot injury. While Ahmed Khadr, often praised the bravery of the mujahideen fighters in Jaji when discussing it with his children, he never confirmed his personal participation in the battle. Essam al-Ridi, an American who took part in the battle, later shared his disillusionment, claiming that approximately 50 mujahideen fighters had been killed while only two Soviet soldiers had perished.

== Significance ==
Although relatively unimportant in military terms, the battle had been chronicled daily by Jamal Khashoggi, a Saudi journalist, and his reporting in Al Majalla and in Arab News. The battle's true significance lay in the creation of mythic narratives portraying "divine miracles" and a remarkable victory as chronicled by these Arab sources. These narratives played a crucial role in attracting new foreign volunteers to join the Afghan war. Abdullah Anas estimated that between three and four thousand volunteers showed up between 1987 and 1989 to join the Afghan jihad. The influx of foreign fighters exceeded the capacity of bin Laden's training camp at Jaji to host them all, leading to the establishment of a network of similar training camps in the vicinity of Khost. Additionally, the battle also had personal benefits for bin Laden. It elevated his status from a mere financier to a military war hero fighting on the front lines in Afghanistan. This newfound reputation contributed to his empowerment and the eventual formation of his organization, al-Qaeda, in Peshawar in 1988.
