= Mustafa Shalabi =

Egyptian Islamist

Mustafa Shalabi (Arabic: مصطفى شلبي) was an Egyptian Islamist. He was the founder of several charities alleged to have links to terrorism who was found murdered on February 25, 1991.

Shalabi was an early associate of Sheik Omar Abdel-Rahman, after Abdel-Rahman's arrival in the United States. Funds he raised are said to have been used to finance the 1993 World Trade Center bombing.

Abdel-Rahman is said to have circulated a denunciation of Shalabi in early 1991. Shalabi took this threat seriously enough to send his wife back to Egypt. Shalabi was found murdered a few days later. Abdel-Rahman denied knowledge of any plots to assassinate Shalabi but the assassination is attributed to his followers.

The Al Kifah Refugee Center that Shalabi founded has been described as of pivotal importance in Operation Cyclone—America's covert program to send radical, foreign, militant, fundamentalist, Islamists to Afghanistan, to strengthen the resistance against the Communists. Maktab al-Khadamat, the organization Osama bin Laden was to hijack and turn into al Qaeda was one of the main beneficiaries of the American aid funneled through questionable charities like al Kifah.

According to Gerald Posner's book Why America Slept: The Failure to Prevent 9/11:

The center's director was Emir Mustafa Shalabi, a young Egyptian immigrant with a shock of red hair. Shalabi was infused with the same religious fervor for the Afghan cause that roused many young Muslims who regarded it as a holy war to liberate an Islamic country from communist domination. Neighbors began calling Alkifah the "jihad office." Shalabi invited Sergeant Ali Mohamed, a former Egyptian army officer and U.S. Army Green Beret, to the center's basement offices under the al-Farooq mosque. Armed with official U.S. Army videotapes and military documents marked "Top Secret," Mohamed conducted a series of weekend "training" classes and a two-week-long intensive seminar. Almost all the volunteers were Arab immigrants. They bought $600 one-way fares as a sign they were willing to give their lives for Islam.

Other future terrorists whom Shalabi would have met at the al Kifah center include:

- El-Sayyid A. Nosair: Charged with killing Rabbi Meir Kahane.
- Mohammed Salameh: Convicted in the first World Trade Center bombing in 1993.
- Clement Rodney Hampton-El: Convicted in the first World Trade Center bombing in 1993.
- Mahmud Abouhalima: Convicted of conspiracy in the East African embassy bombings in 1998.
- Imam Fawaz Damra: Alleged to have recruited suicide bombers.

Shalabi is said to have also founded the Brooklyn Jihad Center'. Other sources say that "the Jihad Center" was merely another name for the al Kifah Refugee Center.

== See also ==
- Charities accused of ties to terrorism
