= Mamdouh Mahmud Salim =

Sudanese al-Qaeda co-founder imprisoned in the US (born 1958)

- ممدوح محمود سالم
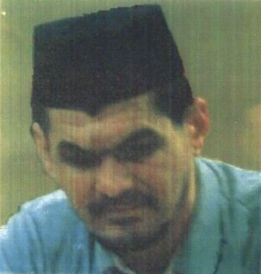
- Born: 1958 (age 67–68); Sudan
- Other names: Abu Hajer al-Iraqi أبو هاجر العراقي
- Status: Incarcerated at ADX Florence
- Conviction: Attempted murder
- Criminal charge: Terrorism
- Penalty: Life imprisonment without parole

Mamdouh Mahmud Salim (Arabic: ممدوح محمود سالم, Mamdūḥ Maḥmūd Sālim; born 1958) is an Iraqi Kurdish co-founder of the Islamist terrorist network al-Qaeda. He was arrested on 16 September 1998 near Munich. On 20 December 1998, he was extradited to the United States, where he was charged with participating in the 1998 United States embassy bombings.

He was convicted of attempted murder after stabbing one prison guard during an attempted escape on 1 November 2000. He was sentenced to 32 years for the crimes in May 2004. In December 2008, however, a federal appeals judge ruled that the judge in the case was in error when he ruled that the stabbing was not part of a terrorism plot. He ordered resentencing.

He was re-sentenced to life without parole in August 2010. He is now an inmate of the ADX Florence facility.

== Founding al-Qaeda in 1988 ==
Salim was trained as a communications engineer. He attended two meetings from August 11–20 in 1988, along with Osama bin Laden, Ayman al-Zawahiri, Mohammed Atef, Khalid Sheikh Mohammed, Jamal al-Fadl, Wael Hamza Julaidan, and Mohammed Loay Bayazid and eight others, to discuss the founding of "al-Qaeda".

According to Jamal al-Fadl, Salim instructed militant recruits in the works of Ibn Taymiyyah. Other allegations suggest he travelled to China, Japan or Hong Kong with Mohammed Loay Bayazid in 1990 to facilitate the purchase of communications equipment for the Sudanese government. In Khartoum, he travelled to Hilat Koko with Jamal al-Fadl in late 1993 or early 1994, and met with Amin Abdel Marouf to discuss chemical weapons.

He is also credited by al-Fadl's testimony with a 1992 fatwa issued at the request of Al Qaeda leadership, described as pivotal in al-Qaeda's development as it provided the group with justification for the killing of Muslim civilians and bystanders in the course of killing Americans and other non-Muslim enemies. The fatwa is putatively based on one by the influential 14th-century Salafi scholar Ibn Taymiyyah ("Ibn al Tamiyeh") permitting the killing of Muslim supporters of the "Tartars" (Mongols) who threatened to invade the Mamluk Sultanate in Egypt. In testimony al-Fadl was asked:

Q. Can you tell us now what Abu Hajer al Iraqi said about Ibn al Tamiyeh?
A. He said that our time now is similar like in that time, and he say Ibn al Tamiyeh, when a tartar come to Arabic war, Arabic countries that time, he say some Muslims, they help them. And he says Ibn al Tamiyeh, he make a fatwah. He said anybody around the tartar, he buy something from them and he sell them something, you should kill him. And also, if when you attack the tartar, if anybody around them, anything, or he's not military or that -- if you kill him, you don't have to worry about that. If he's a good person, he go to paradise and if he's a bad person, he go to hell.

He was arrested approximately September 8, 1998, in Freising, Germany, and extradited to the United States where he was charged for his role in the 1998 embassy bombings. However, his joint bank account with Mamoun Darkazanli was not investigated, and the latter transferred the funds to an al-Qaeda operative who would later participate in the September 11 attacks.

== Indictment for the embassy bombings ==
Salim's name occurs frequently in 157-page indictment, sometimes alongside the name of Osama bin Laden and no one else. According to the indictment:

- He was a member of the majlis al shura of al-Qaeda
- He managed al-Qaeda training camps and guesthouses in Afghanistan and Pakistan
- He purchased land for training camps
- He purchased warehouses for storage of items including explosives, and purchased communications and electronics equipment
- He transferred funds between corporate accounts
- He transported money and weapons to members of al-Qaeda and associated terrorist organizations
- He traveled, on behalf of al Qaeda and its affiliated groups, to Malaysia, China, the Philippines, and Germany
- He worked with Wadih el-Hage in various of bin Laden's companies
- He helped to obtain communications equipment for the Sudanese intelligence service
- He made efforts [in 1993] to obtain the components of nuclear weapons
- In September 1998, he lied to German and American law enforcement regarding al-Qaeda, Egyptian Islamic Jihad, and the embassy bombings
- In 2000, while under arrest by American civil authorities, he participated in the capture and assault of a prison guard (who was seriously and permanently injured) and tried to take other hostages
- Several times around 1992 and again around 1996, he "met with an Iranian religious official in Khartoum as part of an overall effort to arrange a tripartite agreement between al Qaeda, the National Islamic Front of Sudan, and elements of the Government of Iran to work together against the United States, Israel and other Western countries".
