= Abu Ayoub al-Iraqi =

Al-Qaeda leader

- Born: Unknown; Unknown
- Died: Unknown; Unknown
- Occupation: Militant
- Known for: Founding member of al-Qaeda

Abu Ayoub al-Iraqi has been credited with being one of the original founders of al-Qaeda, but he does not appear on public "wanted" lists and his status is apparently not known.

In the 2001 trial for the 1998 bombings of U.S. Embassies in Africa, Jamal al-Fadl testified that he first met Abu Ayoub al-Iraqi at a worldwide jihad group in a meeting in Khost, Afghanistan in 1989. Al-Fadl termed him the "emir" of al-Qaeda, but clarified that he was always second to Osama bin Laden.

Abu Ayoub was replaced by Abu Ubaidah al-Banshiri as emir, apparently sometime before 1991, according to trial testimony from both al-Fadl and L'Houssaine Kherchtou. Al-Banshiri died in an accidental drowning in 1996. as L'Houssaine Kherchtou described Abu Ubaidah as al-Qaeda's second-in-command at that time. Other material suggests, however, that he was #3, since he was replaced by Mohammed Atef.
