= Mohammed Loay Bayazid =

American al-Qaeda founder

- Born: Syria
- Other names: kunya: Abu Rida al-Suri; Nidal

Born in Syria, Mohammed Loay Bayazid is an American citizen alleged to have been a founding member of al-Qaeda, although he has cooperated with American authorities and claims his role in the group has been over-stated.

He was alleged to have been sympathetic to Shias, and tried to foster better relationships between a variety of Sunni extremist groups with Imad Mughniyah of Hezbollah.

== Life in the United States ==
I went to Afghanistan with a blank mind and a good heart...everything was totally strange. It was like I was born just now, like I was an infant, and I have to learn everything new. It was not so easy after that to leave and go back to your regular life.

— Bayazid, in 2003

Bayazid moved to the United States with his parents, as a teenager, and began studying engineering at University of Missouri-Kansas City in 1982, but he later moved to Tucson, and studied at the University of Arizona. He is believed to speak Persian, Chinese, Arabic and English fluently.

In 1985, he decided to join the mujahideen repelling the Soviet invasion of Afghanistan.

Two years later, bin Laden wrote him a letter explaining that Abu Abdel Lateef may come spend the night with him prior to his flight to Yemen, and asked him to visit the Yemeni embassy to check whether a Saudi would need a visa to fly to Yemen; he also asked that Bayazid try to bring 500,000 Rupees when they next met.

== Life in Sudan ==
In 1988, he allegedly took notes during one of the formative meetings detailing the creation of al-Qaeda. Noted for his penchant for "always teasing bin Laden", Bayazid jokingly asked whether he had thought of the logistics of transporting mujahideen to the fight, asking "How...Air France?".

He ran Al-Ikhlas International, an import/export company producing honey and other consumables believed to have been owned by bin Laden.

Bin Laden sent a letter to Bayazid informing him that Mohammed Atef and Abu Ubaidah al-Banshiri were to each be given 6,500 Saudi riyals monthly, the same as they would have been given for their work in Maktab al-Khidamat. Bayazid is believed to have recruited his friend Mubarak al-Duri into working for bin Laden's companies.

The FBI claims that Bayazid was part of a team sent to try to obtain weapons-grade uranium; Bayazid reportedly telling a colleague about how he and another man had "tried to purchase uranium and were hustled out of $100,000"

He allegedly held a bank account with Bank Shaml, and supplied weapons to Defaa al Shabi. Other allegations suggest he travelled to China, Japan or Hong Kong with Abu Hajer al-Iraqi in 1990 to facilitate the purchase of communications equipment for the Sudanese government.

== Return to the United States ==
By 1994, Bayazid had returned to the United States, obtaining his Illinois driver’s license and joining Benevolence International Foundation. On December 16, 1994, Mohammed Jamal Khalifa travelled to the United States to meet with Bayazid, who was then helping to lead BIF - both were arrested, although Bayazid was released almost immediately.

== Later life ==
Bayazid consented to be interviewed by the FBI in 1998, and again with agent Jack Cloonan following 9/11. He consistently denied that he had been present at the founding meeting of al-Qaeda, and insisted he had broken with the group.

In 2002, the CIA sent Rolf Mowatt-Larssen to again interview al-Duri and Bayazid, to see if they could be made to defect and aid the United States in its war on terror, but both refused to collaborate.

In 2003, he met with author Lawrence Wright to provide information for his book The Looming Tower. That year, American courts ruled that the government had been remiss in not providing exculpatory evidence casting doubt on their claims of Bayazid's importance within al-Qaeda.
