= Mohammed Atef =

Egyptian al-Qaeda military commander (1944–2001)

Mohammed Atef محمد عاطف
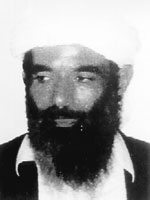
- Mohammed Atef
- Born: 1944 (Note: Other reported birth dates: June 17, 1944, 1951, 1956, or January 17, 1958.); Monufia Governorate, Kingdom of Egypt
- Died: November 14–16, 2001 (aged 56–57); Kabul, Afghanistan
- Cause of death: Assassination by airstrike
- Military career
- Allegiance: Al-Qaeda
- Rank: Military Commander
- Nicknames: Al-Khabir; Taysir Abdullah; Abu Khadijah; Abu Fatima
- Conflicts: Soviet–Afghan War; Battle of Jaji; United States invasion of Afghanistan; Fall of Kabul †

Mohammed Atef (Arabic: محمد عاطف, romanized: Muḥammad ʿĀṭif; born Sobhi Abd Al Aziz Mohamed El Gohary Abu Sitta, also known as Abu Hafs al-Masri and al-Khabir; 1944 – November 2001) was an Egyptian militant and prominent military chief of al-Qaeda, and a deputy of Osama bin Laden, although Atef's role in the organization was not well known by intelligence agencies for years. He was killed in a US airstrike in November 2001.

Atef served two years in the Egyptian Air Force and became an agricultural engineer. He was also a police officer and a member of the group Egyptian Islamic Jihad before he moved to Afghanistan to repel the Soviet invasion, while operating from Peshawar. He has been credited as having convinced Abdullah Azzam to abandon his life and devote himself to preaching jihad at this time.

Atef was sent to an Afghan training camp where he met Ayman al-Zawahiri, who later introduced him to Osama bin Laden.

He attended two meetings from August 11 to 20 in 1988, along with bin Laden, al-Zawahiri, Mamdouh Mahmud Salim, Jamal al-Fadl, Wa'el Hamza Julaidan, and Mohammed Loay Bayazid and eight others, to discuss the founding of "al-Qaeda". Bin Laden later sent a letter to Mohammed Loay Bayazid informing him that Atef and Abu Ubaidah al-Banshiri were to each be given 6,500 Saudi riyals monthly, the same as they had been given for their work in Maktab al-Khidamat.

== In Sudan ==
Atef followed al-Qaeda to the Sudan in 1992 until the group was forced to leave, following the execution of the teenaged son of Ahmad Salama Mabruk, and Atef moved to Afghanistan.

In 1994, he refused to allow American double agent Ali Mohammed to know which name and passport he would be traveling under, expressing concerns that Mohammed could be working with the American authorities. He traveled to Mombasa, Kenya, where he met with Mohammed Odeh and gave him money to purchase himself a 7-tonne trawler and start a fishing business.

While in Sudan, he allegedly conducted a study which resulted in him presenting al-Qaeda details on why aircraft hijackings were a poor idea as they were engineered to allow the negotiation of hostages in exchange for prisoners, rather than inflicting damage. Another alleged study he carried out determined that the Afghan Arabs and Taliban could together topple the dictatorship of Pervez Musharraf in Pakistan, and the government of Iran.

In 1995, Atef gave Khalid Sheikh Mohammed details for a contact in Brazil. When Mohammed returned to Afghanistan, he turned to Atef to set up a meeting with bin Laden in Tora Bora, at which he told the pair his plans for military attacks against the United States.

Prior to 1996, Abu Ubaidah al-Banshiri, Atef and Yaseen al-Iraqi aided Enaam Arnaout in purchasing AK-47s and mortar rounds from a Pashtun tribesman named Hajji Ayoub, and they were subsequently delivered in large trucks to the Jawr and Jihad Wahl training camps.

== Named military chief ==
Abu Hafs was the real chief of al-Qaeda. Bin Laden was very humble, I could ask him for advice in particular circumstances and he would simply say: "Go and ask Abu Hafs, who is more intelligent than me".

— Paulo Jose de Almeida Santos

In 1996, al-Qaeda's military chief Abu Ubaidah al-Banshiri drowned in a ferry accident on Lake Victoria, and Atef was chosen to succeed him. He drew up a plan summarizing the positive qualities of Taliban leaders, and showed his "nuanced understanding" that the United States had energy interests in the Caspian Sea which would lead them to want an oil pipeline built through Afghanistan in the near future.

In 1998, a number of militants began to speak openly of their disdain for Atef, leading bin Laden to convene a meeting at which he spoke at length about Abu Bakr's loyalty to Muhammad. Comparing Atef to the Prophet's lieutenant, he reminded those present that Atef "knew of Jihad before most of you were even born", and warned them that he didn't want to hear any more "negative talk" about Atef.

Atef was allegedly sent into Somalia at least twice to meet with tribal leaders, once having to escape aboard a small Cessna aircraft used for transporting khat. Years later, a material witness told American authorities that he flew Atef and four others from an al-Qaeda compound in the Sudan, to Nairobi, Kenya to train Somali fighters. This led the United States to accuse him of training the militants who attacked their troops in the 1993 Battle of Mogadishu.

== 1998 embassy bombings ==
On May 7, 1998, Atef faxed bin Laden a fatwa signed by Afghan scholars on May 7, which said that attacks against American civilians could be justified. Three months later, al-Qaeda carried out the 1998 U.S. embassy bombings, leading to Atef's indictment as having been involved in the preparation of the attack.

Following the American reprisal bombings, Atef frisked journalists looking to meet bin Laden. On November 4, an arrest warrant was issued in the United States for Atef.

Atef also began speaking to Hambali in Singapore, as the Indonesian-based militant sought al-Qaeda's financing for Jemaah Islamiyah operations. In turn, when Atef informed Hambali of al-Qaeda's need for a new biological engineer, the latter sent Yazid Sufaat to al-Zawahiri.

== Planning of further militant activity ==
In the 1999 Returnees from Albania, he was tried in absentia by an Egyptian court which sentenced him to seven years' imprisonment for his association with the EIJ. That year, he met repeatedly with bin Laden and Khalid Sheikh Mohammed at the Al-Matar complex to discuss possible targets for the 9/11 attacks. It was accepted that Atef was the one responsible for organizing the hijackers for the attacks. Near the end of the year, he met with Ramzi bin al-Shibh, Mohamed Atta and Ziad Jarrah and explained they would be undertaking a highly secret operation, in cooperation with Nawaf al-Hazmi whom he named as Rabia al-Makki.

Following the 2000 USS Cole bombing, Atef was moved to Kandahar, Zawahiri to Kabul, and bin Laden fled to Kabul, later joining Atef when he realised no American reprisal attacks were forthcoming. Whenever al-Qaeda organised games of volleyball, Atef and bin Laden were forced to be on separate teams since they were both tall and skilled.

In January 2001, in Kandahar, Atef's daughter married bin Laden's 17-year-old son Mohammed; the wedding guests included Osama's mother, al-Jazeera journalist Ahmad Zaidan, a "few" Taliban party members, and about 400 others. Osama recited poetry about the USS Cole bombing, but was upset with his delivery and tried having Zaidan re-record the section before deciding he preferred the earlier version.

That year, Mullah Omar is said to have argued that bin Laden should not draw further reprisals against Afghanistan by striking the United States again. This led to a schism among al-Qaeda leadership, where Atef sided with bin Laden, while leaders like Saif al Adel sided with Omar.

He is believed to have given José Padilla money to travel back to Egypt from Afghanistan, to visit his wife. The two then formed a working relationship. He also gave Ramzi bin al-Shibh money to travel from Karachi to Malaysia to meet with Atta. When David Hicks completed his training at al-Farouq, Atef interviewed him about his achievements and asked about the travel habits of Australians, before agreeing to suggest he be moved to the Tarnak Farms training camp.

Atef was a serious-minded man, a disciplined man. He was not the gregarious type who could live with the young mujahideen and understand and solve their problems and address their concerns ... his work and activities sometimes compelled him to avoid people and keep away from others.

— Abu Jandal

Following the September 11, 2001 attacks, and still a fugitive from his U.S. indictment in the 1998 Embassy bombings, Atef appeared on the initial list of the FBI's top 22 Most Wanted Terrorists, which was released to the public by President Bush on October 10, 2001. Debka.com has suggested that Atef led an "elite unit" of militants who captured and killed rival warlord Abdul Haq in October 2001.

In early November 2001, the Taliban government announced they were bestowing official Afghan citizenship on him, as well as bin Laden, Zawahiri, Saif al-Adel, and Shaykh Asim Abdulrahman.

Described as a "devout" and "very quiet man", Atef was one of the few al-Qaeda leaders to not make public video statements. He is alleged to have written a 180-page manual entitled "Military Studies in the Holy Struggle against Tyrants", and directed Afghan training camps himself.

== Death ==
Atef was killed, along with his guard Abu Ali al-Yafi'i and six others, in a U.S. airstrike on his home near Kabul during the U.S. invasion of Afghanistan at some time during November 14–16, 2001. American intelligence intercepted communications from those digging through the rubble of Atef's home, leading them to believe they had been successful in killing him. According to the Combating Terrorism Center he was killed in a strike on an "al Qa'ida safehouse". Reports said that American bomber aircraft had destroyed the house while MQ-1 Predator UAVs had destroyed vehicles parked outside the house.

Donald Rumsfeld was initially cautious and indicated only that reports of Atef's death "seem authoritative". His death was confirmed when the ambassador of the Taliban, Abd Al-Salam Dhaif, said three days later, "Abu Hafs al-Masri died from injuries he suffered after US warplanes bombed his house near Kabul."

When American forces sifted through the rubble of his house, they found a number of videocassettes, including five that carried martyrdom messages from Abderraouf Jdey, Ramzi bin al-Shibh, Muhammad Sa'id Ali Hasan, and Khalid Ibn Muhammad Al-Juhani. Another videocassette included Hashim Abas casing American institutions in Singapore for possible attack by Jemaah Islamiyah in 1999, but was not turned over to Singapore authorities until December 14. It showed a bus station where American military personnel departed for their base, a temple adjoining American military barracks, a park where off-duty soldiers gathered and the Eagle's Club restaurant owned by the American government for its local workers.

Wall Street Journal reporter Alan Cullison purchased two computers that had been looted from the home on the black market, and noted that while Atef's computer had relatively few files, the other computer appears to have belonged to Ayman al-Zawahiri and held nearly a thousand files, including some of importance.

On November 8, bin Laden delivered a joint eulogy for Atef and Jummah Khan Namangani. Following his death, it was rumored that Saif al-Adl would take over his position as Military Chief of al-Qaeda. Under interrogation, a number of suspected militants including Ibn Shaykh al-Libi later invented fictitious ties from Atef to other uninvolved entities to distract American attention from their true colleagues. Al-Libi told interrogators that Atef had sent an emissary named Abu Abdullah to Iraq to obtain chemical and biological warfare training for two al-Qaeda members in December 2000. This led the CIA to release a paper tying al-Qaeda to Iraq in January 2003, and justifying the invasion two months later, which arguably relieved some of the pressure on militants in Afghanistan.

Atef appeared in a video released in September 2006 that showed the planning of the September 11 attacks.

Atef has been named as a conspirator in the conspiracy charges against several of the Guantanamo captives. In March 2002, Bosnian security forces raided a Benevolence International Foundation office in Sarajevo and seized a computer which contained a number of documents suggesting a degree of complicity with al-Qaeda, including a letter to Atef from Enaam Arnaout stating that "the organization loaned us a howitzer cannon, and it must be returned so that it can be transferred to Kabul".

== See also ==
- Abu Hafs al-Masri Brigades
- Abu Hafs the Mauritanian
