= Saeed al-Masri =

Egyptian al-Qaeda member

- Born: 27 February 1955; Egypt
- Died: 21 May 2010 (aged 55); Boya, North Waziristan, Pakistan
- Other name: Sheikh Saeed al-Masri

Mustafa Ahmed Muhammad Uthman Abu al-Yazid (Arabic: مصطفى أحمد محمد عثمان أبو اليزيد), better known as Saeed al-Masri (Arabic: سعيد المصري) or simply al-Masri, (27 February 1955 – 21 May 2010) was an Egyptian who was alleged to have acted as the financial chief for al-Qaeda. Along with Mahfouz Ould al-Walid and Saif al-Adel, al-Masri was believed to have opposed the September 11 attacks two months prior to their execution. He was killed in a targeted killing drone airstrike in Pakistan on 21 May 2010.

== In Pakistan ==
He was initially arrested among hundreds of others following the assassination of Anwar Sadat in 1981. He was imprisoned for three years in Egypt, and shortly after he joined Egyptian Islamic Jihad, and in 1988 went to Afghanistan. He had two wives and several sons and daughters, including one married to the son of Sheikh Omar Abd al-Rahman.

As of 1991, al-Masri was working as the financial chief for al-Qaeda, running the Mektabh al-Muhassiba (accounting office) in Peshawar. He was alleged to have appointed Ibrahim al-Qosi as his deputy to handle money destined for NGO projects.

== In Sudan ==
Al-Masri set up a financial office on McNimr Street in Khartoum on 9 June 1993, from where he managed al-Qaeda's payroll. al-Fadl aided al-Masri until he was replaced by Abu Dijana al-Yemeni and Abdallah Lubnani.

After receiving his pilot license, L'Houssaine Kherchtou returned to the Sudan in December 1995, but was appalled to find that his wife, heavily pregnant and in need of $500 for a cesarean section, was begging on the streets for money to allow her entrance to Khartoum's general hospital. Kherchtou went to al-Masri and asked him to cover his wife's medical bills, and was upset upon being informed there was no money to spare and al-Masri suggested he take her to a Muslim charitable hospital for free treatment. He angrily demanded to know "if it was your wife or your daughter, you would take her there", and later recounted that he was angry enough to have shot al-Masri if he had had a gun at the time.

== Return to Pakistan, claims of death ==
There is nothing that is worth mentioning about [al-Masri] and we cannot classify him as being one of the well-known leaders that rotated within Al-Qa'ida during at least the past ten years... he is not one of the well-known leaders.

— Muntasser al-Zayat commenting on the 2007 video

In May 2007, al-Masri released a video promising Americans that al-Qaeda troops had been training through the winter and were ready to begin a fresh summer offensive in Afghanistan.

In December, al-Masri was said to have claimed responsibility for the assassination of Benazir Bhutto, telling Adnkronos International that "we terminated the most precious American asset which vowed to defeat mujahideen". The Asia Times Online also reported that it had received a claim of responsibility from al-Masri by telephone.

al-Masri allowed himself to be interviewed on Geo Television in July 2008 following the Danish embassy bombing, which he claimed were carried out by a Saudi follower of al-Qaeda.

Pakistan's DAWN reported him killed on 13 August 2008, in an airstrike in Bajaur. Tehrik-i-Taliban spokesman Maulvi Omar, himself captured five days after the attack, denied the claim that al-Masri had been killed. Others suggested that the report of his death was a Pakistani attempt to refute recent American accusations that sections of the ISI were still assisting al-Qaeda and the Taliban.

On 9 February 2009, the Indian government received a video from al-Yazid in which he reiterated the promise of Pakistani retaliation if India launched a first strike. This video took everyone by surprise as he was presumed to be dead.

== Confirmed death ==
He was reported as having been killed in a U.S. drone attack in Pakistan on 21 May 2010, along with his wife, three daughters and granddaughter. His death was confirmed by both US officials and al-Qaeda.

== See also ==
- Assassination of Benazir Bhutto
