= 2008 Danish embassy bombing in Islamabad =

June 2008 terror attack in Islamabad, Pakistan

2008 Danish embassy bombing
- Part of Jyllands-Posten Muhammad cartoons controversy
- Damage done to the embassy as reported by TV 2 News in Denmark
- Location: 33.732188°N 73.067552°E; Islamabad, Pakistan
- Date: 2 June 2008; 12:10 (UTC+5)
- Target: Danish Embassy
- Attack type: Suicide car bomb
- Deaths: 3 policemen 3 employees 1 bomber
- Injuries: 24
- Perpetrator: al-Qaeda

The 2008 Danish embassy bombing was an attack on the Danish embassy in Islamabad, Pakistan on 2 June 2008. The suspected suicide car bombing in the parking lot of the embassy took place at around 12:10 pm (UTC+5), killing at least six and wounding many more. The Danish national security intelligence agency PET concluded that al-Qaeda was behind the attack. Al-Qaeda claimed responsibility for the attack on 5 June 2008. The attack was confirmed to be an answer to the reprinting of Danish newspaper Jyllands-Posten's Muhammed cartoons in February 2006, as well as the presence of Danish troops in Afghanistan.

== Details ==
=== The attack ===
Around 12:10 pm on 2 June 2008, a stolen Toyota Corolla with a man at the wheel arrived at high speed, passing in front of the entrance of the Danish embassy, then stopping at the parking lot in front of the complex. Seconds later a suicide car bomb detonated, killing at least six and wounding several others. The events leading up to the explosion and the explosion itself was captured on tape by the embassy's video surveillance cameras, which was gathered by the PET and then handed over to Pakistani authorities as part of their criminal enquiry. The car used to bomb the embassy was able to get past heightened security because it had diplomatic registration plates.

The blast left a large crater in front of the building, as well as significant structural damage. A cloud of black smoke was reported to be visible across the city of Islamabad. A Pakistani Development Organisation building took the brunt of the blast as well as the Danish embassy. Other offices and residential building also were damaged by the car bomb. The residences of the Dutch ambassador and the Australian defense attache, located near the Danish embassy, were damaged in the blast, but none of their staff were reported injured. The blast also shattered the windowpanes of the nearby "India House", which houses India's ambassador to Pakistan. There is speculation about the composition of the bomb. Some sources states that 25 kg of explosives were used, while others states that a combination of fertilisers and diesel fuel, boosted with 5 kg of explosives were used.

The Danish government received the news of the attack at 9 o'clock in the morning, and the Danish Minister of Foreign Affairs, Per Stig Møller immediately condemned the attack on the strongest possible terms, and the Danish cabinet was subsequently called in for an emergency session. Later in the afternoon the Danish Prime Minister Anders Fogh Rasmussen followed suit and condemned the attack as well. The Norwegian and Swedish embassies were completely evacuated as a safety precaution, and Danish citizens have been advised against all travel to Pakistan, and if already in the country, to be very careful.

=== Fatalities ===
At least six people were killed and 24 wounded. According to the chargé d'affaires of the embassy in Islamabad, Michael Hjortsø, none of those killed were Danish employees of the embassy, though two victims were reported to be locals employed at the embassy, and the Danish foreign ministry announced that one victim was a Danish citizen of Pakistani origin not working at the embassy. Damage was also reported at the residence of the Indian High Commissioner.

A security guard at a nearby United Nations Development Programme building was among those killed. Six of the wounded were UNDP employees.

=== Threats ===
Prior to the explosion, the Danish Embassy had received several threats, the last as late as a month before the attack, Pakistani media reported on tribal people who threatened to travel to the Pakistani capital of Islamabad to blow up the Danish embassy there.

One and a half-month before the attack, Al-Qaeda's then-deputy, Ayman al-Zawahiri, urged Muslims to strike against Danish targets in an interview published by As-Sahab.

In the interview, published 17 April 2008 al-Zawahiri asked why he in 2003 threatened Norway, Denmark and other countries for their support for the United States and the fight against terrorism, saying: "We have threatened Norway and all other countries participating in the war against the Muslims, as part of the defence of our ideology, nation, ourselves and our sacred riter, the al-Zawahiri and continues: "Denmark has done its utmost to demonstrate its hostility against Muslims by repeatedly dishonoring the Prophet, may Allah bless him and grant him salvation. I exhort and encourage any Muslim who has the opportunity, to harm Denmark to thereby show your support for our Prophet, may Allah bless him and grant him salvation, and defend his esteemed honor."

Denmark had downgraded the embassy threat in response to perceived security threats, as well as other embassies in the Islamic world.

=== The perpetrators ===
The Danish national security intelligence agency PET concluded that the terrorist organisation Al-Qaeda was behind the attack. The possibility of either direct Al-Qaida involvement or Al-Qaeda inspired groups is high, due to the fact that the terrorist attack against the Danish embassy came a month and a half after Al-Qaeda's then-deputy, Ayman al-Zawahiri, urged Muslims to strike against Danish targets in the interview published by As-Sahab on 17 April 2008.

According to statements from the Danish Ministry of Foreign Affairs: "There are signs that as a result of the current events there is a sharpened focus on Denmark also among the leading militant extremists abroad, and that such environments have a desire to carry out terrorist acts against Denmark, as well as against the Danes and Danish interests abroad. This is especially true in areas where Al-Qaeda-related groups are active".

According to sources close to the Danish government and PET, the main suspects behind the attack were, until the proclamation made by Al-Qaeda, the Taliban. However, the Taliban denied having any role in the attack. If they had been those responsible for the attack, that would have made the second terrorist attack carried out by Taliban targeting Scandinavians; the first being the attack on Serena Hotel in Kabul on 14 January, where a Norwegian delegation under Minister of Foreign Affairs Jonas Gahr Støre, which resided at the time of the attack, was allegedly the target. Nevertheless, this is the second terrorist attack where Scandinavians had been the target.

On 5 June, an online posting attributed to Mustafa Abu al-Yazid on a jihadist website claimed that Al-Qaeda planned the attack.

Al Qaeda's chief of operations for Pakistan, Fahid Mohammed Ally Msalam was believed to have masterminded the attack. He was killed in a drone strike along with his lieutenant, Sheikh Ahmed Salim Swedan, on 1 January 2009.

Three men charged in the attack were acquitted in a Pakistani court on 25 Sep 2010.

== International reactions ==
=== Countries ===
Country	Response
Australia	"The Australian Government unreservedly condemns the car bombing earlier today outside the Danish Embassy in Islamabad, Pakistan. The Australian Government extends its condolences to those affected by this attack. Australia stands with Pakistan and Denmark in the fight against terrorism and extremism. This bombing is yet another extremist attack on law and order and security in Pakistan. We trust that the perpetrators of the attack will be brought to justice" The Foreign Ministry said.
Canada	David Emerson, Minister of Foreign Affairs, issued the following statement condemning bomb attack on the Danish embassy in Islamabad, Pakistan: "On behalf of all Canadians, I wish to convey my condolences to the families of those killed in today's attack. I wish a speedy recovery to the injured. "Canada strongly condemns this deplorable act of violence against the Danish embassy.
People's Republic of China	"I am shocked to learn that the Danish Embassy in Pakistan suffered a terrorist attack, resulting in loss of several embassy employees and a Danish citizen. I wish to express my deep condolences to the victims, and through Your Excellency, my sincere sympathy to the bereaved families and the wounded." said Yang Jiechi.
Denmark	The Danish Prime minister Anders Fogh Rasmussen called the attack against the Danish embassy in Pakistan a heinous crime and an attack against Denmark. "We regard this as an attack on the Danish embassy, and thus as an attack on Denmark." The Prime Minister also informed that the government is following the situation closely, and that the Pakistani President, Prime Minister and Foreign Minister had sent their condolences and expressed regret what has happened. Rasmussen also said "it was a horrible and cowardly attack which has claimed innocent lives and injured many. In this tragic situation my thoughts and deepest sympathy goes to the victims and their relatives. No one has yet claimed responsibility for the blast. But regardless of who is behind it, and what the motive might be, so it is a heinous crime, which we strongly condemn and denounce." He also said that Denmark would not change their policies in the fight against terrorism. The Danish Minister of Foreign Affairs Per Stig Møller strongly condemned the attack, saying that the attack was "completely unacceptable". "We have severely increased protection. Safety has improved in Pakistan and elsewhere. We have also been hit by an attack in Kabul. But it is dangerous, there are fanatics and terrorists out there, and we do what we can to protect ourselves against them." During a press conference, he went on to say: "What these criminals have done, was done with the purpose to destroy the relationship between the Government of Pakistan, the Pakistani population and Denmark, and they will not succeed in this." He also expressed his condolences to the victims and their families, and advised Danes against traveling to Pakistan: "I do not know who did it. No one knows yet. We are in contact with the Pakistani authorities and expect them to do their utmost to find out who is behind, and what their motives are." Imam Abdul Wahid Pedersen called the terrorist attack "madness" and "shocking and horrible". The Islamic Society in Denmark described the attack as "barbaric" and "totally unacceptable". The spokesperson of the Muslim Council of Denmark, Zubair Butt Hussain, also commented the attack: "Such a shocking action arouses in the Muslim Council of Denmark nothing but revulsion and disgust. Whatever the motivation for such an act may be, can such a cruel action is not justified."
Finland	According to Finnish Ambassador to Pakistan, Irmeli Mustonen, the Finnish Embassy in Islamabad has intensified its security measures, and has as well asked for more police protection.
France	"We were appalled to learn of the attack this morning outside the Danish Embassy in Islamabad. We condemn it in the strongest possible terms. We offer our condolences and sympathy to the victims' families and our solidarity and support to the Pakistani and Danish authorities. France reiterates its determination to combat extremism and terrorism alongside its Pakistani and European partner", said Bernard Kouchner. Sarkozy: "We were appalled to learn of the attack this morning outside the Danish Embassy in Islamabad. We condemn it in the strongest possible terms. We offer our condolences and sympathy to the victims' families and our solidarity and support to the Pakistani and Danish authorities. France reiterates its determination to combat extremism and terrorism alongside its Pakistani and European partners".
Germany	"We are appalled by the attack which we condemn in the strongest terms," deputy foreign ministry spokesman Andreas Peschke told journalists in Berlin. He expressed his country's sympathies for the family members of the victims. The minister told Danish television that there were "fanatics and terrorists out there and we are doing what we can to protect ourselves."
Hungary	Hungary, as a member of the European Union, reassures Denmark and all the employees of the Danish embassy in Islamabad of its solidarity, and extends its heartfelt condolences to the families of the victims.
Israel	"Regrettably, this terrorist attack joins a long list of others directed at civilian targets and the democratic fabric of life, and which also harm those moderate circles in all religions that champion cultural dialogue," Foreign Minister Tzipi Livni said.
Maldives	"This tragic incident must serve to strengthen our resolve to combat and eliminate the global scourge of terrorism. The people who perpetrate such unspeakable acts must never be allowed to break our common will to enjoy lives free of fear and hate and to live together in peace and harmony." said the Foreign Minister of Maldives.
Netherlands	Dutch politician Maxime Verhagen condemned the attack. "I am shocked at this cowardly attack. Our sympathies are with the victims and their families. There can be no excuse for a cowardly terrorist act like this" he said.
Norway	The Norwegian Minister of Foreign Affairs Jonas Gahr Støre was shocked by the attack and condemned it in a press conference: "We have great sympathy with Denmark and will take strong distance from the terrorist attack in Islamabad. This is a shocking use of violence outside of a diplomatic station". He has also contacted his Danish colleague, Foreign Minister Per Stig Møller, and offered Denmark all the assistance that Norway would be able to provide. The Norwegian embassy, which is located only a couple of hundred metres from the Danish Embassy, sustained some minor damages in the blast. The embassy has been completely evacuated as a safety precaution and is now closed. The Norwegian Foreign Ministry advises Norwegians not to travel to Pakistan. The Pakistani community in Norway has also condemned the terrorist attack on the Danish embassy in Islamabad. The leader of the Norwegian branch of the Pakistan Peoples Party, Mirza Sulfikar, said that he condemned the attack on the strongest terms, and that he was going to call his closest colleagues in Pakistan and request that it be added pressure on the security around the foreign embassies. Islamsk Råd Norge also condemned the attack on their webpage. KrF politician Ali Khan, who had acted as a broker during the Muhammad Cartoon Controversy in 2006, said that Denmark's publication of the caricatures was the likely cause of the attack, but that nothing could justify such an attack. Høyre politician Aamir J. Sheikh also came to the conclusion that the Muhammad caricatures were the likely reason for the attack, but like Khan condemned the attack, saying that "Islam and the Quran condemns terrorist actions on the strongest possible terms." In response to the attack on the Danish embassy, the regional newspaper Adresseavisen published the day after the attack (3 June) a caricature of a Muslim with a turban, a suicide belt and a T-shirt with the text "I am Mohammed and no one dares to publish me" written on it. While the drawing itself has been claimed to be a caricature of the Muhammad, the cartoonist behind the drawing, Jan O. Henriksen, and the publisher, Arne Blix, assured the drawing represents terrorists who make violent acts in Islam's name. "It is not an attack on the Prophet and Islam, but an attack on those who claim they are defending Muhammad, but who in reality are people with violent intents." While Arne Blix and Jan O. Henriksen has stated that the drawing would result in little or no response and protest in the Middle East, the drawing has received worldwide attention. In both Norway and Denmark the drawing received media attention from all major newspapers. The infamous Danish cartoonist Kurt Westergaard, who welcomed the drawing in an interview with the Norwegian newspaper Aftenposten, saying: "I think it's good that Jan O. made this drawing in the situation we are experiencing now, where freedom of expression is under attack and innocent lives are lost. We must stand firmly on the right to express ourselves. The freedom of speech is the most important thing we have". He also said that the Norwegian cartoonist would receive threats: "There are militant Muslims who have noticed this. He has exposed himself a lot with this drawing, and he will expect to receive threats." On the other hand, the Pakistani-Norwegian lawyer Abid Q. Raja said that Muslims would interpret the drawing as an insult of Muhammad, and criticised the newspaper for not admitting it to be a Muhammad caricature." In a Google search the television photographer Tariq Ali made with NRK Trøndelag around noon on 4 June, they noticed that over 400 Arab websites had mentioned the Norwegian drawing, and by the end of the day the number had reached 1,300 hits. Most of the websites condemned the drawing, some even stating they were more insulting than the Danish cartoons published in Jyllands-Posten in 2005.
Pakistan	In a letter to the Danish Queen Margrethe II, Pakistani President Pervez Musharaff strongly condemned the attack on the Danish embassy in Islamabad and promised to find and prosecute the perpetrators. "We strongly condemn this terrorist act, which has affected our whole nation deeply", he said while assuring that the attack means that the Pakistani leadership will do even more to combat and eradicate the insurgents. "We are also determined to bring the perpetrators of this appalling crime to justice." The Pakistani Foreign Secretary Salman Bashir said: "The president, the prime minister, as well as the foreign minister, have all very strongly condemned this terrorist attack, and our hearts go out to the families of the victims."
Qatar	Qatar has expressed its condemnation and denunciation of the attack.
Sweden	The Swedish Minister of Foreign Affairs Carl Bildt condemned the attack in an interview with Sveriges Radio, saying: This attack is serious, and totally unacceptable. This shows the threat of terrorism. We must constantly be vigilant. Now it is directed against the Danish Embassy, a Nordic neighbour so that we feel sympathy, and we want to give Denmark all the support that the country may need to deal with this situation. But I have full confidence in the Danish government being able of dealing with the situation." When asked about why the attack was aimed at Denmark, he continued: "It is difficult to speculate in. We know, of course, not yet who it is. There are various fundamentalist and terrorist groups. They may have different agendas, they are targeted against various Western countries. Denmark has sometimes been the focus of the debate, sometimes other countries have been in focus. There is no reason to believe that Denmark would actually be more in focus than others. This is aimed against all of us." He further commented that as the attack had affected the whole os Scandinavia, there is a possibility that Sweden might be targeted as well, and that they would follow the events closely. Sweden along with Norway, immediately closed its embassy in Islamabad.
Turkey	Minister of Foreign Affairs Ali Babacan sent messages to his Pakistani and Danish counterparts following the terror attack. "We extend our condolences to the families of the victims of the attacks and the people of Pakistan, and wish speedy recovery to those wounded".
United States	U.S. President George W. Bush condemned the attack on the Danish embassy in Islamabad. The presidential spokeswoman Dana Perino said that "We condemn this terrorist act, there is nothing that can defend it", and that the president has been briefed, who sent his condolences to the victims of the violence and to their families. The U.S. Embassy in Islamabad urged Americans to use extra caution when travelling through Islamabad and to avoid the blast site. The U.S. Ambassador to Denmark, James Cain, said: "It is a tragic reminder of how far the bad people will go to prevent the spread of freedom." He gave his full support to Denmark, promising that the U.S. will support and defend the Danish embassies and interests, since the two countries are united in the fight for freedom. He also urged Denmark to continue to show courage and continue defending freedom.
Ukraine	The Ukrainian Foreign Ministry stressed that: "the inadmissibility of any terrorist attacks, particularly attacks on the buildings and workers of diplomatic institutions developing cooperation and strengthening mutual understanding between countries and nations," and expressed solidarity to a statement by the United Nations Security Council.

=== International organisations ===
Organisation	Response
Al-Qaida	On 5 June an online posting attributed to Mustafa Abu al-Yazid on a jihadist website claimed that Al-Qaida planned the attack, saying: "In Allah the most compassionate, most merciful name, honoured be Allah, lord of the worlds, and may prayers and peace lie with the imam of Justice, our Prophet Muhammad, his family, his followers, and those who continue to support him to the Last Judgement. This event comes in the context of our jihad against the attack on our Islamic nation committed by crusaders, Jews and all the tyrannical enemies of Islam, and it is in defence of our religion and the Muslims' blood, their land and their honor. And this comes in retaliation for what the infidels of the so-called State of Denmark has published: the degrading cartoons of the Prophet Mohammed, peace be with him – which they refuse to apologise for the publication, although they have had many occasions to do so. We have launched the words of the quran verse 'and for those who insult the messenger of Allah, they must face a painful torment' (Surah 9:61). This is what has been promised by Sheikh Osama bin Laden when he said, "If there is no control of your press freedom, so let your hearts be open to our acts of freedom. The answer is what you see, not what you hear, and many of our mothers will grief for us if we do not help the messenger of Allah (peace and blessings for him) '. One of Al-Qaeda's brave heroes, the martyr operation on the morning of Monday June 2, 2008, aimed at the Danish Embassy in Islamabad, where they hided in their fortress which they thought was safe from the omnipotent of Allah's retaliation. We will shortly publish more information by the will of Allah, and also identify the martyr brother, who was responsible for the implementation of the operation, may Allah show him mercy. This should serve as a warning to the infidel countries, in terms of crimes against the Prophet Muhammad, peace be with him. They must immediately apologize, otherwise, this will only be the first step in the fight. We congratulate the Islamic nation with this successful strike against the enemies of Allah, the staff at the Danish Embassy. This operation also contributes to the crucial role of Pakistani mujahideen, who participated in the preparation of this operation. They have pride and enthusiasm in their faith. And the credit goes to Allah, his messenger and the believers. "
European Union	The European Commission condemned the terrorist attack on the Danish embassy in the Pakistani capital Islamabad. "The Commission is still in the process of verifying the information we have received, and create the appropriate contacts, which can assess the situation", commission spokesman Johannes Laitenberger said. He continued: "The Commission condemns acts of terrorism and violence and therefore this action. The Commission expresses its solidarity with the victims of terror, and in this case, the Commission expresses of course its solidarity with its Member State Denmark."
United Nations	The United Nations Security Council met to condemn the "in the strongest terms the attack... causing numerous deaths, injuries and damage to nearby buildings, including a building housing the United Nations Development Programme" and to express "its deep sympathy and condolences to the victims of this heinous act of terrorism and to their families, and to the people and Governments of Pakistan and Denmark."; According to a spokesperson of UN Secretary-General Ban Ki-moon, the Secretary-General strongly condemned the car bombing outside the Danish Embassy in Islamabad, and reiterates his total rejection of such acts of terrorism and expressed his condolences to the families of the victims and to the Government of Pakistan.

== See also ==
- List of terrorist incidents in 2008
- List of attacks on diplomatic missions
- 2008 Kabul Serena Hotel attack – a terrorist attack on the Serena Hotel resided by a Norwegian delegation
