= Asim Abdulrahman =

Osama bin Laden follower

Asim Abdulrahman is an Egyptian Islamist militant. The son of Omar Abdel-Rahman (The Blind Sheikh), he has been described as "among the closest" of Osama bin Laden's followers in the days following the September 11th attacks in 2001.

Under the kunya Abu Asim, Abdulrahman was believed to have led an Egyptian militant group that allied itself with the World Islamic Front as of 1998.

In early November 2001, the Taliban government announced they were bestowing Afghan citizenship on him, as well as bin Laden, Ayman al-Zawahiri, Saif al-Adel and Mohammed Atef.
