= Fazul Abdullah Mohammed =

Comorian-Kenyan al-Qaeda member (1972-2011)

- Born: Abdullah Muhammad Fazul Husseine Mullah Ati; 25 August 1972; Moroni, French Comoros
- Died: 8 June 2011 (aged 38); Mogadishu, Benadir, Somalia
- Military career
- Allegiance: Al-Qaeda
- Branch: Al-Qaeda in East Africa
- Service years: 1990–2011
- Nicknames: Abdallah Mohammed Fazul; Abu Seif al-Sudani; Abu Aish; Abu Fadl al-Qamari; Abu Luqman; Fadel Abdallah Mohammed Ali; Fouad Mohammed; Harun Al-Qamar; Abdulkarim; Fadil Harun; Harun Fazul; Harun; Yaqoub al-Dusari
- Commands: Head of Al-Qaeda in East Africa
- Conflicts: Somali Civil War: Somalia War (2006–2009); Somali Civil War (2009–present); Battle of Mogadishu (2010–2011) †

Fazul Abdullah Mohammed (Arabic: فاضل عبدالله محمد; born Abdullah Muhammad Fazul Husseine Mullah Ati; Arabic: عبد االله محمد فاضل حسين ملا اتي; 25 August 1972 – 8 June 2011) also known as Fadil Harun, was a Comorian-Kenyan member of al-Qaeda, and the leader of its presence in East Africa. He is regarded as the organiser of the 1998 United States Embassy bombings.

== Early life ==
Mohammed was born in the Magoudjou district of Moroni, Comoros, in 1972, although he regularly used alternate birthdates for the year 1974. He was involved in mainstream Sunni Islam teaching since an early age, reciting prayer instructions on Radio Comoro when he was 9 years old. At age 15, he accepted a scholarship in Sudan, where he adopted fundamentalist beliefs, under the guidance of Soidiki M'Bapandza, a preacher had left the Comoros following a short-lived political career of an unpopular Islamist party.

Besides his native Comorian and French, Mohammed learnt to speak Swahili, Arabic, and English.

In his teenage years, Mohammed studied medicine and physics in Pakistan and Saudi Arabia. Between 1991 and 1992, while in Afghanistan, he joined al-Qaeda and trained at mujahideen training camps, where he learnt to make explosives and to forge identity documents. In the mid-1990s, he became a religious teacher in Lamu, Kenya, where he married and received citizenship. He obtained a false identity card listing his birthplace as Lamu and his name as Haroon Fazul. By 1998, Mohammed had also acquired a Pakistani passport for the same name.

== Role in al-Qaeda ==
Mohammed and a number of others were under indictment in the United States for their alleged participation in the 1998 United States embassy bombings in East Africa. He was served with an Interpol arrest warrant since 1998. Mohammed was on the FBI's list of most wanted terrorists since its inception on 10 October 2001. The reward for finding Mohammed was US$5 million.

In Kenya, Mohammed was once the secretary of, and lived in the same house as, Wadih el-Hage. El-Hage was indicted with Mohammed, and has been convicted. A letter to el-Hage, thought to be from Mohammed, was exhibited at el-Hage's trial.

Mohammed spent time in Mogadishu planning a truck bombing against a United Nations establishment there, and was in the city on 3 October 1993, when Somali gunmen brought down two American helicopters and killed 18 U.S. special operations soldiers.

== War on Terror ==
Mohammed was suspected in Kenya of involvement in two attacks in Mombasa on 26 November 2002. One was the truck bombing of Paradise Hotel, in which 15 were killed. The other was the launch of two shoulder-fired missiles at an Israeli airliner on takeoff; the missiles missed and there were no casualties.

On 26 May 2004, United States Attorney General John Ashcroft and FBI Director Robert Mueller announced that reports indicated that Mohammed was one of seven al-Qaeda members who were planning a terrorist action for the summer or fall of 2004. American Democrats labeled the warning "suspicious" and said it was held solely to divert attention from President Bush's declining poll numbers and to push the failings of the 2003 invasion of Iraq off the front page. CSIS director Reid Morden voiced similar concerns, saying it seemed more like "election year" politics, than an actual threat. The New York Times pointed out that one day before the announcement, they had been told by the Department of Homeland Security that there were no current risks.

According to an FBI interrogation report, an associate of Mohammed confessed that the militant trained with al-Qaeda and Osama bin Laden in Afghanistan. Ahmed Ghailani, also on that list, was captured in Pakistan a month later. Soon thereafter, several press reports, claiming UN and official US sources, described the participation of several al-Qaeda personnel, including Mohammed and Ghailani, in the acquisition and movement of diamonds in Liberia.

When the ferry MV Bukoba sank in Lake Victoria in 1996, taking al-Qaeda co-founder Abu Ubaidah al-Banshiri with it, Mohammed was one of the individuals sent to the scene by al-Qaeda, attempting to verify that Abu Ubaidah had drowned, and had not in fact been murdered.

== Suspected involvement in Somali conflict ==
In early 2007, during the War in Somalia, Mohammed was thought to be in the border area near Ras Kamboni, along with remnants of the Islamic Courts Union. On 8 January 2007, a US Air Force AC-130 gunship targeted al-Qaeda in the area. It is likely he was one of the targets as The Pentagon has said the "target of the strike was the principal al-Qaeda leadership in the region." Somali government officials said that his death was confirmed in an intelligence report provided to Somali authorities by the United States. However, in an interview with the BBC, the US ambassador to Kenya, Michael Ranneberger, denied that Mohammed had been killed in the airstrike. The gunship attack resulted in the deaths of at least 70 civilian nomads and many more injuries as they were searching for a water source at night.

One of Mohammed's wives and her children were captured trying to escape to Kenya from Somalia. They were arrested in Kiunga and brought to Nairobi for questioning. Before Mohammed's wife was deported back to Somalia by the Kenyan government, a computer in her possession thought to have been Mohammed's was seized and was said to have "contained vital information on terrorism training and intelligence collection including spying". Mohammed was believed to "be very good with computers".

While it was never confirmed that Mohammed escaped from the fighting in Somalia or had even been there when the violence broke out, Madagascar's largest newspaper, Midi Madagasikara, reported in early February 2007, that Mohammed was currently residing in the island nation. This is in contrast to the statement by Abdirizak Hassain, saying that Mohammed was killed in the Battle of Ras Kamboni by a U.S. airstrike. Quoting military and "other sources," the newspaper claimed he was in the city of Mahajanga. A partner of his from the Comoros currently resides on the island.

On 2 August 2008, Mohammed supposedly escaped a police dragnet in Malindi, Kenya, but two of his aides were arrested. He was said to have been covertly taken into Kenya from Somalia a few days previously, seeking treatment for kidney problems. The police confiscated two of his passports and a laptop, among other belongings. The police operation took place several days before the 10th anniversary of the 1998 Embassy bombings.

=== Al-Qaeda top commander in East Africa ===
On 11 November 2009, Mohammed's consecration as commander took place in an open ceremony in the southern Somali city of Kismayo, according to a translation received by The Long War Journal of an article posted on Waaga Cusub, a pro-insurgency website, run by a Somali clan, the Hawiye. According to the website, he "delivered his longest speech delivered his longest speech [sic]". Referring to his appointment by Osama bin Laden and praising his predecessor, Saleh Ali Saleh Nabhan, killed by US special forces in mid-September, Mohammed acknowledged his role in the 1998 US embassy bombings in Kenya and Tanzania. He promised that al-Qaeda would take the fight to neighboring countries. "Praise be to God," Mohammed said. "After Somalia we will proceed to Djibouti, Kenya, and Ethiopia."

After the July 2010 Kampala attacks in nearby Uganda, which targeted people watching screenings of the World Cup final, Shabaab's spiritual leader, Sheikh Mukhtar Abu Zubayr threatened to carry out further attacks on foreign soil, in particular in Burundi and Uganda, due to the presence of peacekeeping troops from these countries in Somalia. He named the group that perpetrated the attacks as the Saleh Ali Nabhan Brigade which was likely led or directed by Mohammed at the time.

Mohammed's role as Shabaab's military leader, as well as the involvement of other foreign al-Qaeda commanders in Somalia, was confirmed in a report compiled by the African Union Mission for Somalia, and published in The EastAfrican. A US intelligence operative, specializing in the al-Shabaab group, confirmed the information to a website specialized in reporting on the war on terror.

== Death ==
Mohammed and a Kenyan extremist, thought to be Musa Hussein (a.k.a. Musa Sambayo), were driving in a car carrying $40,000 in United States dollars, as well as medicine, telephones, laptops and a South African passport in the Afgooye corridor, northwest of Mogadishu, on 7 June 2011. Musa Hussein was known to Mohammed as Abdullahi Dere and is believed to have been involved in funding operations for al-Shabaab. At around 11:15 p.m., the car was stopped at a security checkpoint managed by the Somalian military (SNA) in the Sarkuusta area, in southwest Mogadishu. Captain Hassan Mohamed Abukar ordered the driver to switch on the light inside the car. The driver followed the order but switched the light on and off too quickly for the soldiers to identify the people in the car; then one of the occupants opened fire. An order was given to open fire on the car. Two occupants in the car were killed and buried in Mogadishu within 24 hours. At least one other occupant escaped. Somalia's National Security Agency suspected one of the dead to be Fazul after examination of the belongings; DNA tests subsequently confirmed his identity. Documents found on his body indicated he was planning a number of attacks in Britain, including one against Eton College.

Mohammed's death was confirmed by Somali and U.S. government officials and was characterized by the U.S. Secretary of State Hillary Clinton as "a significant blow to Al Qaeda, its extremist allies and its operations in East Africa."
