= Wadih el-Hage =

Terrorist

- Born: July 25, 1960 (age 66); Sidon, Lebanon
- Detained at: ADX Florence
- Other names: "deck Sabur" or "Abdel Saboor",
- Alleged to be a member of: al-Qaeda
- Charge(s): Criminal conspiracy Perjury
- Penalty: Life imprisonment without the possibility of parole plus $33.8 million in restitution.
- Occupation: Secretary for Osama bin Laden
- Spouse: April el-Hage
- Children: 7

Elias el-Hage (Arabic: وديع الحاج, Wadī‘ al-Ḥāj) (born July 25, 1960) is a Lebanese and naturalized American-French citizen, who is serving life imprisonment in the United States based on conspiracy charges relating to the 1998 United States embassy bombings.

Struggling financially, he decided to move his family to Quetta, Pakistan, but returned to run the Al Kifah Refugee Center in Brooklyn after the death of Mustafa Shalabi. While running the al-Kifah Refugee Center he met some of the extremists involved in the 1993 World Trade Center bombing. At the time of their trial, he was in Sudan working as a secretary for Osama Bin Laden. In 1996 and 1997, after Bin Laden left Sudan for Afghanistan, el-Hage worked in Nairobi, Kenya. Under the pretense of doing charity work, he organized the al-Qaeda network that planned and carried out the embassy bombing in Nairobi.

El-Hage was indicted and arrested in 1998, and convicted on all counts and sentenced to life without parole in 2001. His sentence was overturned in 2008 because it was based on federal mandatory sentencing guidelines invalidated by the US Supreme Court in 2005. He was re-sentenced to life without parole in 2013.

== Early life ==
El-Hage was born in a Maronite Christian family on 25 July 1960 in Sidon, Lebanon, but grew up in Kuwait, where he converted to Islam. His family was so angered by his conversion that he was forced to leave home and was taken in by a Kuwaiti sheikh who paid for his education, including college. He traveled to the United States for college. From 1978, he studied urban planning at the University of Louisiana at Lafayette, then-named the University of Southwestern Louisiana.

El-Hage interrupted his schooling to travel to Afghanistan via Pakistan. Although a lifelong physical disability prevented any direct participation in the fighting against the USSR, he worked for a Saudi charity called the Muslim World League. He was reportedly under Abdullah Yusuf Azzam, an important figure in the early history of al-Qaeda. El-Hage returned to his university in January 1985, graduating in 1986. He married an 18-year-old American Muslim named April and relocated to Arizona. There he held several low-wage jobs, including city custodian. He became a naturalized citizen of the United States in 1989.

Over the next few years, the el-Hage family traveled repeatedly to Pakistan, initially taking along his mother-in-law and her husband. In an interview with PBS Frontline, el-Hage's mother-in-law said, "I was the matron surgical nurse at an Afghan surgical hospital. Wadih did not actually fight, but acted as an educator. My husband went with Wadih to deliver textbooks and Qur'ans to the young people. It was a Jihad, a fight for Islam."

== Background ==
At an Islamic conference in Oklahoma in December 1989, el-Hage met Mahmud Abouhalima, who was later convicted for his part in the 1993 World Trade Center bombing. El-Hage's prosecutors say that Abouhalima told el-Hage to buy a .38 caliber revolver. El Sayyid Nosair used that revolver to kill Rabbi Meir Kahane.

At some later point, el-Hage moved with his family to Arlington, Texas. He was called to the Brooklyn charity Alkifah Refugee Center, by the group's office in Tucson, via el-Hage's mosque in Arlington. Family members acknowledge that he was in contact with the Alkifah group, and say that he was called in to mediate a dispute. A week later, the group's leader, Mustafa Shalabi, was found stabbed to death in an apartment that he shared with Abouhalima. This murder is unsolved. El-Hage's family said that he cried when he heard that Shalabi was dead.

In January 1992, el-Hage was arrested for writing false checks. In the car with him at the time of his arrest was Marwan Salama, whose phone records show his contact with the conspirators of the 1993 World Trade Center bombing.

Shortly thereafter, el-Hage moved his family to Sudan and worked as a secretary for Osama bin Laden, who operated a network of businesses and charities, some of them fronts, in East Africa at the time. El-Hage often travelled to Europe in this capacity. Prosecutors believe that el-Hage became a key aide to Bin Laden.

In 1994, his wife April convinced el-Hage to leave Sudan and stop working for Bin Laden's organization there. As his mother in law said, "April would have none of that. She is Muslim, but she is also American, and she wouldn't stand for it." However, prosecutors believe that el-Hage continued to work for bin Laden's organisation in Nairobi, Kenya. In Kenya, he became the director of Help Africa People, a Muslim charity organization, which Kenyan documents say helped control malaria. El-Hage also made money in the jewelry business. Prosecutors say that el-Hage was in contact in Kenya with Abu Ubaidah al-Banshiri, who was al-Qaeda's #2 member until his death in 1996. The badly wanted al-Qaeda suspect Fazul Abdullah Mohammed moved in and worked at the house as a secretary. In a letter, Mohammed Saddiq Odeh admitted knowing el-Hage in Nairobi and said that el-Hage attended his wedding.

On August 21, 1997, el-Hage's home in Nairobi was raided by Nairobi Police and FBI agents who had a search warrant. Wadih was away in Afghanistan during the raid and documents and a computer were taken from the home. His wife and mother said that they were told by the authorities that they should go back to the United States. Two days later, el-Hage was questioned upon his return from Afghanistan and told to leave Kenya. In September 1997, he returned to Arlington with his family; several accounts say that he sold all of his possessions to fund the trip.

== Arrest & trial ==
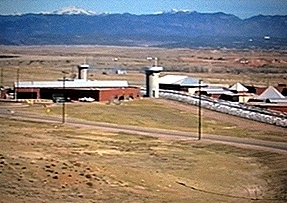
ADX Florence, el-Hage's current residence.

A year after el-Hage returned to America with his family, the U.S. embassies in Dar es Salaam, Tanzania and Nairobi, Kenya were attacked with truck bombs on August 7, 1998. Two weeks after the attacks, the FBI interviewed el-Hage and questioned him about his connection to Osama bin Laden. During this interview, el-Hage denied knowing Mohammed Odeh and claimed he didn't recognize a picture of him. He also testified before a grand jury investigating the embassy attacks where he claimed to have never known al-Banshiri, Odeh or other associates of bin-Laden. Soon after, he was arrested on charges of perjury and conspiracy to kill American nationals. After a six-month trial, el-Hage was convicted of conspiracies to kill U.S. nationals; to murder U.S. government employees and internationally protected persons; and to destroy buildings and property of the United States as well as multiple counts of perjury. On October 18, 2001, he was sentenced to life in prison.

In 2008, the 2nd U.S. Circuit Court of Appeals reversed his sentence, citing a 2005 U.S. Supreme Court case that struck down the mandatory application of federal sentencing guidelines used in his case. His resentencing was scheduled for 2009, but his defense asked that the date be pushed back. In April 2013, he was sentenced to life in prison and additionally ordered to pay $33.8 million in restitution. He is incarcerated at Florence ADMAX USP; his Bureau of Prisons number is 42393-054.
