= Jamal al-Fadl =

Sudanese former Al-Qaeda member (born 1963)

- Born: 1963 (age 62–63); Khartoum, Sudan
- Known for: al-Qaeda informant

Jamal Ahmed al-Fadl (Arabic: جمال أحمد محمّد الفضل, Jamāl Aḥmad Muḥammad al-Faḍl; born 1963) is a Sudanese militant and former associate of Osama bin Laden in the early 1990s. Al-Fadl was recruited for the Afghan war through the Farouq mosque in Brooklyn. In 1988, he joined al-Qaeda and took an oath of fealty to bin Laden. After a dispute with bin Laden, al-Fadl defected and became an informant to the United States government on al-Qaeda's activities.

== Al-Qaeda ==
Initially working at a grocery store in Brooklyn, Al-Fadl was recruited to join the cause of the Afghan mujahideen "through the Farouq mosque in Brooklyn", presumably when he was in the U.S. in the mid-1980s. Al-Fadl traveled to Pakistan and began attending training camps where he learned how to shoot AK-47s, RPGs and how to handle explosives. He eventually became a "senior employee" of al-Qaeda.

He attended meetings on August 11 and 20, 1988, with Osama bin Laden, Ayman al-Zawahiri, Mohammed Atef, Mamdouh Mahmud Salim, Wael Hamza Julaidan, and Mohammed Loay Bayazid and eight others to discuss the founding of "al-Qaeda". In Khartoum, he traveled to Hilat Koko with Mamdouh Mahmud Salim in late 1993 or early 1994, and met with Amin Abdel Marouf to discuss chemical weapons.

Al-Fadl became a business agent for al-Qaeda but resented receiving a salary of only $500 a month while some of the Egyptians in al-Qaeda were given $1,200 a month. When Osama bin Laden discovered that al-Fadl had skimmed about $110,000 and asked for restitution, the latter defected and became an informant for the United States.

== Defection ==
After embezzling $110,000 from the organization, al-Fadl "defected". He contacted the CIA via the United States's Eritrean embassy and, receiving encouragement from FBI special agents Jack Cloonan and Dan Coleman (who were "seconded" to the CIA's Bin Laden unit), he returned (after staying in Germany for a while) to the United States, in spring 1996. While in protective custody, al-Fadl won a modest sum in scratch tickets in the New Jersey lottery, which was taken away by his guards.

For the next three years Cloonan and his colleagues oversaw al-Fadl in a safehouse. From December 1996, al-Fadl began to provide "a major breakthrough of intelligence on the creation, character, direction, and intentions of al Qaeda"; "bin Laden, the CIA now learned, had planned multiple terrorist operations and aspired to more" — including the acquisition of weapons-grade uranium. Al-Fadl, who had "passed the polygraph tests he was given", became a key witness in the US v. bin Laden trial that began in February 2001.

His upkeep during the first 12 years of his life in Witness Protection were deemed "expensive", as he reportedly was an "incessant troublemaker" who suffered severe emotional mood swings, a taste for womanizing and financial scheming.

== Testimony in court ==
Al-Fadl testified in a trial, United States v. Osama bin Laden, No. S(7) 98 Cr. 1023 (S.D. N.Y.), Feb. 6, 2001 (transcript pp. 218–219, 233); Feb. 13, 2001 (transcript pp. 514–516); Feb. 20, 2001 (transcript p. 890).

In January 2001, the trial began in New York City of four men accused of the 1998 U.S. embassy bombings in east Africa. The U.S also wanted to prosecute Osama bin Laden in his absence under the Racketeer Influenced and Corrupt Organizations Act (RICO). To be able to do so under American law, the prosecutors needed evidence of a criminal organization, which would then allow them to prosecute the leader, even if he could not be linked directly to the crime.

Al-Fadl was taken on as a key prosecution witness, who, along with a number of other sources, claimed that Osama bin Laden was the leader of a large international terrorist organization which was called al-Qaeda. al-Fadl provided a list of 25 names he claimed were the key members of the group, which included five identifiable Saudis and six identifiable Egyptians.

=== Fatwa ===
In giving testimony, Jamal al-Fadl described a 1992 fatwa issued by "Abu Hajer al Iraqi" (Mamdouh Mahmud Salim) at the request of Al Qaeda leadership, that was putatively based on an earlier fatwa by the influential 14th-century Salafi scholar Ibn Taymiyyah ("Ibn al Tamiyeh") permitting the killing of Muslim supporters of the "Tartars" (Mongols) who threatened to invade the Mamluk Sultanate in Egypt. The fatwa has been described as a pivotal development in that it provided al-Qaeda with justification for the killing of Muslim civilians and bystanders.

Q. Can you tell us now what Abu Hajer al Iraqi said about Ibn al Tamiyeh?
A. He said that our time now is similar like in that time, and he say Ibn al Tamiyeh, when a tartar come to Arabic war, Arabic countries that time, he say some Muslims, they help them. And he says Ibn al Tamiyeh, he make a fatwah. He said anybody around the tartar, he buy something from them and he sell them something, you should kill him. And also, if when you attack the tartar, if anybody around them, anything, or he's not military or that -- if you kill him, you don't have to worry about that. If he's a good person, he go to paradise and if he's a bad person, he go to hell.

=== Al-Fadl's debriefing ===
Patrick J. Fitzgerald, who would later become well known for serving as the Special Prosecutor who investigated the Bush Presidency's leak of the identity of CIA agent Valerie Plame, played a lead role in debriefing al-Fadl.

The transcripts from his debriefing ran to 900 pages. According to the New York Times:

"The transcripts themselves emerged from a messy process: The videotapes they detail were made by mistake, from 2000 to 2002, by federal marshals who had set up the videophone hookup so prosecutors in New York could keep in close touch with Mr. Fadl. Prosecutors and the F.B.I. had not authorized the taping, and when prosecutors learned of it in 2002 they were shocked, knowing they would have to share the tapes with defense lawyers who were appealing the embassy bombings verdict."

The New York Times profiled al-Fadl on December 9, 2007. Their review of the transcripts described his anxieties over testifying, the emotional difficulties enforced idleness caused, and the emotional difficulties his entire family faced due to isolation and culture shock. The article describes his wife, who didn't speak English, demanding he refuse to testify, and threatening to leave him and return to Sudan.

== See also ==
- Bin Laden Issue Station - the CIA's bin Laden tracking unit, 1996–2005
- The Power of Nightmares; BBC Documentary
- Fatāwā of Osama bin Laden
