= Ali Mohamed (double agent) =

American spy (born 1952)

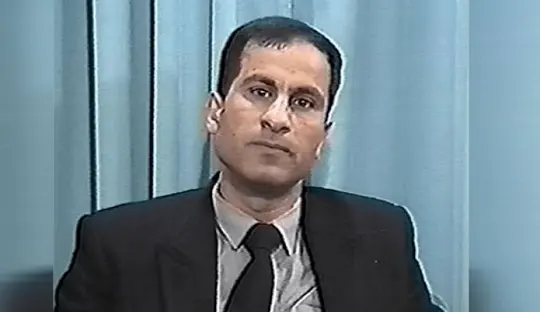
Ali Abdul Saoud Mohamed in 1989

Ali Abdul Saoud Mohamed (Arabic: علي عبد السعود محمد) (born June 3, 1952) is an Egyptian Islamist militant who was convicted of involvement in the al-Qaeda 1998 United States embassy bombings in Nairobi, Kenya, and in Dar es Salaam, Tanzania.

Mohamed was a major in the Egyptian Army's military intelligence, until being discharged for suspected fundamentalism in 1984. During this period he was a member of the Egyptian Islamic Jihad (EIJ). According to FBI special agent Jack Cloonan, Mohamed trained Mujahideen militants en route to fight against Soviet occupation of Afghanistan and called him "bin Laden's first trainer". He then became an agent for the U.S. Central Intelligence Agency (CIA) but was quickly dropped by the agency after an undercover operation in West Germany. He worked as double agent for EIJ reporting on the workings of the CIA. He moved to the United States and enlisted in the U.S. Army in 1986. He then returned to Afghanistan 1988 and used his U.S. military experience to train al-Qaeda and other Muslim militants.

He returned to the United States working as a translator for Ayman al-Zawahiri, Emir of the EIJ and future Emir of al-Qaeda, who toured California in 1993 following the 1993 World Trade Center bombing, hoping to raise money for EIJ. Mohamed was later charged in connection with the 1998 United States embassy bombings in Kenya and Tanzania. In October 2000, he pleaded guilty to five counts of conspiracy to kill nationals of the United States and to destroy U.S. property.

== In Afghanistan ==
During the 1980s, Mohamed was involved in the training of the anti-Soviet Afghan mujahideen. Mohamed conducted training during the war to small classes that included Osama bin Laden and Ayman al-Zawahiri, later leaders of al-Qaeda, and the terrorist members responsible for the bombings of the two U.S. embassies in Africa. His training took place in training camps in Afghanistan. He also spent much time fighting in Afghanistan himself against the Soviet forces.

After moving to the United States and joining the U.S. Army, Mohamed gathered intelligence about the Army and U.S. infrastructure during his time as a drill instructor and support sergeant. In 1988, he returned to Afghanistan to fight the Soviet Union. During this time, it is widely believed that he continued to train cells of terrorists using the information learned while living in the U.S. After a month he returned to the United States.

In 1990, Mohamed returned to Afghanistan, and once more, trained terrorists in the art of guerrilla and unconventional warfare which include hijacking, suicide bombing, kidnapping, and IED bombs.

During this time, it is also known that he began planning the embassy bombings with Osama bin Laden and Ayman al-Zawahiri. Later, Mohamed was key in assisting the movement of al-Qaeda from Afghanistan to Sudan. He moved back and forth, assisting in key movements of camps.

In 1992, Mohamed made several trips to Afghanistan as part of the training of terrorist cells. During that year he made at least 58 trips whilst under CIA surveillance. He fought and trained in the civil war among the Afghan mujahideen that ensued after the defeat of the Soviet forces. In this time he trained the al-Qaeda generals in the art of intelligence warfare. This included surveillance, counter-surveillance, assassinations, kidnapping, codes, and ciphering codes.

The system of cell structures and groups within a terrorist faction was developed by Ali around this time as a means of making it harder to destroy terrorism by spreading members out. Bin Laden and Ali Mohamed worked closely to create cells in Tanzania and Kenya to help prepare for the bombings of the embassies. After planning ended, Ali moved to Nairobi where he helped set up a terrorist cell. He funded the cell by creating companies in the fishing and car business. After setting up, he moved back to Afghanistan where bin Laden and other members of al-Qaeda discussed plans for the bombings and other information.

== In the United States ==
Mohamed was an Egyptian Army intelligence colonel until 1984. He served with Khalid al-Islambouli, an Islamist terrorist who carried out the assassination of Anwar el-Sadat in 1981. After the assassination Mohamed was discharged on suspicion of fundamentalism. In 1984, Mohamed offered his services to the CIA in Cairo station, which believed he was sent by Egypt as a mole but informed other stations of his interest. He was ultimately transferred to the station dedicated to espionage on Iran in Frankfurt, West Germany, and was stationed to infiltrate a Hezbollah-affiliated mosque in Hamburg. According to Lawrence Wright he "immediately told the Iranian cleric in charge that he was an American spy assigned to infiltrate the community." The mosque had already been penetrated and his announcement was passed on to the CIA, which "terminated Mohamed" and "sent out cables labeling him highly untrustworthy." By this "time, however, Mohamed was already in California on a visa-waiver program that was sponsored by the agency itself, one designed to shield valuable assets or those who have performed important services for the country."

In America he married an American woman from Santa Clara, California, after a 6-week courtship and became a U.S. citizen. He enlisted in the U.S. Army and managed to get stationed at the John F. Kennedy Special Warfare Center and School at Fort Bragg, North Carolina, until 1989. "His awed superiors found him 'beyond reproach' and 'consistently accomplished'."

According to Cooperative Research, Mohamed was a drill sergeant at Fort Bragg, and was hired to teach courses on Arab culture at the John F. Kennedy Special Warfare Center and School. During his time he was open about his religious beliefs, cooking his own meals to ensure they were halal and listening to the Quran on his Walkman during morning runs.

In 1988, Mohamed informed his superior officers in the U.S. Army that he was taking some leave time to fight Soviets in Afghanistan. "A month later, he returned, boasting that he had killed two Soviet soldiers and giving away as souvenirs what he claimed were their uniform belts."

Mohamed's commanding officer, Lt. Col. Robert Anderson, said he wrote detailed reports aimed at getting the Military Intelligence Corps to investigate Mohamed—and have him court-martialed—but the reports were ignored.

"I think you or I would have a better chance of winning Powerball, than an Egyptian major in the unit that assassinated Sadat would have getting a visa, getting to California ... getting into the Army and getting assigned to a Special Forces unit," he said. "That just doesn't happen."

It was equally unthinkable that an ordinary American GI would go unpunished after fighting in a foreign war, he said.

Anderson said all this convinced him that Mohamed was "sponsored" by a U.S. intelligence service. "I assumed the CIA," he said.

Mohamed also took maps and training manuals off base to downsize and copy at Kinko's and used them to write al-Qaeda's multivolume terrorist training guide.

In 1989, he transferred from active duty to the U.S. Army Reserve, taking a job as a security guard at a defense contractor manufacturing components of Trident missiles.

Mohamed also conducted clandestine military and demolition training through the Al Kifah Refugee Center in Brooklyn and Jersey City. While in the United States, he helped train a number of jihadis, including El Sayyid Nosair, who went on in November 1990 to assassinate militant Rabbi Meir Kahane in New York, and Mahmud Abouhalima, who assisted Ramzi Yousef in his 1993 terrorist truck bomb attack on the World Trade Center in New York.

In the early 1990s, Mohamed returned to Afghanistan, where "he trained the first al-Qaeda volunteers in techniques of unconventional warfare including kidnappings, assassinations, and hijacking planes, which he had learned from the American Special Forces." According to FBI special agent Jack Cloonan, in one of Mohamed's first classes were Osama bin Laden, Ayman al-Zawahiri, and other al-Qaeda leaders.

In 1993, Mohamed escorted Ayman al-Zawahiri, posing as a Kuwaiti Red Crescent representative, on a speaking tour across the United States. He also traveled to Africa to survey embassies in Africa such as the Nairobi, Kenya, embassy which Al-Qaeda later bombed. In May, he became an FBI informant after being approached by John Zent in San Jose, informing U.S. Department of Defense counterintelligence analysts about the existence of al-Qaeda's training camp network in Afghanistan. It is believed that Egyptian Islamic Jihad, which had not yet formally merged with al-Qaeda, authorized the leak on al-Qaeda in order to gain access to American intelligence information in return. Although the meeting with Mohamed proved to provide the United States with some of the most valuable intelligence on al-Qaeda for years, the FBI did not act on Zent's report and the DOD did not take notes on the meeting.

In 1994, al-Qaeda operative Mohammed Atef refused to allow Mohamed to know which name and passport he would be traveling under, expressing concerns that Mohamed could be working with the American authorities.

In a televised interview Mohamed explained his rationale for his efforts: "Islam without political dominance cannot survive."

=== 1993 Vancouver airport incident ===
Mohamed was detained in early 1993 by the Royal Canadian Mounted Police (RCMP) at Vancouver International Airport to which Mohamed had come to meet an associate of Osama bin Laden, who was caught there upon arriving from Damascus with two forged Saudi passports. The RCMP was about to arrest Mohamed but he told the RCMP that he was an FBI asset and was released immediately by the RCMP at the request of the FBI.

== Arrest and trial ==
In 1998, two weeks after the East African embassy bombings, FBI agents searched Ali's apartment. They found evidence of terrorist activities which included plans and scripts of Al-Qaeda training. Ali Mohamed had made plans to leave the country to meet with Osama bin Laden. However he was subpoenaed to testify in the trial of the other suspects. The same day of the trial, Mohamed was arrested as a key suspect in the embassy bombings.

Just before the trial, the FBI ordered that a polygraph test to be conducted on Mohamed but it later was discarded after Mohamed struck a guilty plea to receive life sentence without parole. The deal between Mohamed and the government was struck on October 13, 2000. He was charged with 5 counts of conspiracy. The sentencing trial as shown below identified the specific counts that Ali Mohamed was to be indicted.

The first count charges a violation of title 18, under the United States code, section 2332(b) which is the conspiracy to kill nationals of the United States of America wherever they are in the world. In such case, the citizens were located at the embassy of the United States of America in Kenya and Tanzania.

The second count was conspiracy to murder, kidnap and maim outside the United States. This would include the conspiracy to kill US nationals employed by American military in the embassies.

Count three was conspiracy to murder, through violating sections 1114 or 1116. Under section 1116, Ali sought to kill United States government employees under their roles as employees of the United States of America.

Count four charges a conspiracy to destroy buildings or property owned or leased by the United States government. The government proved that Ali attempted and planned to destroy or damage buildings or property owned or leased by the United States government.

Finally, count five is the conspiracy to destroy national defense utilities of the United States government. Ali told the court that he had been involved with the Egyptian Islamic Jihad in the 1980s and was introduced to Osama bin Laden in the 1990s. “In 1992, I conducted military and basic explosives training for al Qaeda in Afghanistan. Among the people I trained were Harun Fadhl and Abu Jihad. I also conducted intelligence training for al Qaeda. I taught my trainees how to create cell structures that could be used for operations”. Ali then included information in the events leading up to the embassy bombings; “In the early 1990s, I assisted al Qaeda in creating a presence in Nairobi, Kenya, and worked with several others on this project. Abu Ubaidah was in charge of al Qaeda in Nairobi until he drowned. Khalid al Fawwaz set up al Qaeda’s office in Nairobi. A car business was set up to create income. Wadih el Hage created a charity organization that would help provide al Qaeda members with identity documents”. Ali then told the court that he was asked by bin Laden to identify possible targets of which he conducted surveillance on the American Embassy building.

== Speculated cooperation with U.S. intelligence ==
In October 2001, the Raleigh News & Observer noted that Ali Mohamed may be cooperating with the U.S. government. "Defense lawyers and many other observers believe that Mohamed, who has not yet been sentenced, is now cooperating with the United States, though the government has never confirmed this. When he is sentenced he could receive as little as 25 years under his plea agreement." In his book The Mission, The Men, and Me: Lessons from a Former Delta Force Commander, former Delta Force commander Pete Blaber indicates he met Ali Mohamed who gave him information on how to infiltrate Afghanistan, find al-Qaeda commanders, and operate in country undetected in late 2001.

Further news sources in 2001 seem to suggest that Ali Mohamed is providing information on al-Qaeda in an attempt to reduce his sentence, and that his sentencing "has been postponed indefinitely." In 2006, Mohamed's wife, Linda Sanchez, was reported in 2006 as saying, "He's still not sentenced yet, and without him being sentenced I really can't say much. He can't talk to anybody. Nobody can get to him. They have Ali pretty secretive...it's like he just kinda vanished into thin air."

In 2011, former FBI agent Ali Soufan confirmed that Mohammed is still awaiting sentencing. Since October 2001 he has not appeared in public records of the US Prison system, and his current whereabouts are unknown. It is speculated that he may be in witness protection somewhere in the United States.
