= Maktab al-Khidamat =

1984–1989 organization fighting the Soviets in Afghanistan

- مكتب الخدمات
- Founders: Abdullah Azzam; Osama bin Laden
- Founded: 1984
- Dissolved: 1989
- Merged into: Al-Qaeda
- Ideology: Islamic jihadism
- Annual revenue: Bin Laden's personal inheritance, private charitable donations
- Part of: Afghan mujahideen
- Wars: Soviet war in Afghanistan

The Maktab al-Khidamat, or Maktab Khadamāt al-Mujāhidīn al-'Arab (Arabic: مكتب الخدمات or مكتب خدمات المجاهدين العرب), also known as MaK and the Afghan Services Bureau, was an organization founded in 1984 by Abdullah Yusuf Azzam and Osama bin Laden to support the Afghan mujahideen in the Soviet–Afghan War (1979–1989).

The Soviet Union invaded Afghanistan in 1979. MaK recruited foreign mujahideen into the Afghan jihad against the Soviets and their ally, the Democratic Republic of Afghanistan. MaK trained the foreigners and commanded them in a large jihadist force.

MaK was funded by bin Laden's inheritance from his wealthy family, who ran the Saudi Binladin Group construction company. A popular misconception is that the U.S. directly trained bin Laden's mujahideen fighters; however, bin Laden had ties to Pakistan's Inter-Services Intelligence (ISI) agency during Operation Cyclone (1979–1992), a CIA initiative to funnel money and arms for the Afghan mujahideen through ISI acting as the intermediary.

Following the Soviet withdrawal from Afghanistan in 1989, and Azzam's dispute with bin Laden and Ayman al-Zawahiri over MaK's future, Azzam was killed by multiple land mine detonations; the attack was possibly organized by bin Laden or al-Zawahiri. Afterwards, bin Laden assumed full control of MaK, and had it absorbed into al-Qaeda, a militant organization he founded in 1988.

== Background ==
In the Soviet–Afghan War (1979–1989), Muslim-majority Afghanistan was invaded by the mostly non-Muslim Soviet Union. As socialists, the Soviets backed the Democratic Republic of Afghanistan, a socialist national government which was installed in a military coup in 1978.

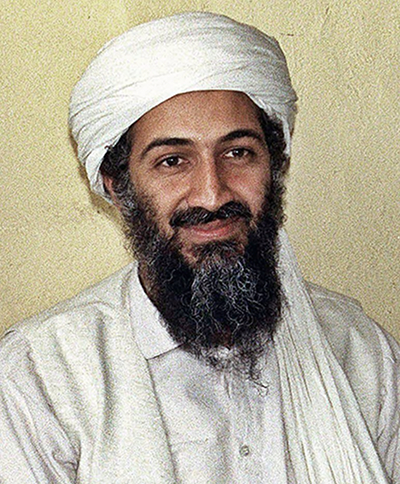
Osama bin Laden

Osama bin Laden—a Saudi Islamist connected to the royal House of Saud—left college in Saudi Arabia in 1979, and went to Pakistan with Abdullah Yusuf Azzam. Bin Laden used money and machinery from his wealthy family's construction company, the Saudi Binladin Group, to help the Afghan mujahideen. The latter were Muslims who fought the Soviets as jihadists; those who engage in jihad, struggle in the name of Islam, are called mujahideen. Bin Laden later told a journalist: "I felt outraged that an injustice had been committed against the people of Afghanistan." He likely moved there with the knowledge and support of Saudi Arabia, which opposed the Soviet occupation.

Like bin Laden, from 1979 to 1992, the CIA (as part of Operation Cyclone), Saudi Arabia, and China provided between $6–12 billion worth of financial aid and weapons to tens of thousands of Afghan mujahideen fighters, through Pakistan's Inter-Services Intelligence (ISI) agency. The Democratic Republic was overthrown in 1992, leading to the 1992–1996 Afghan Civil War.

== Afghanistan operations ==
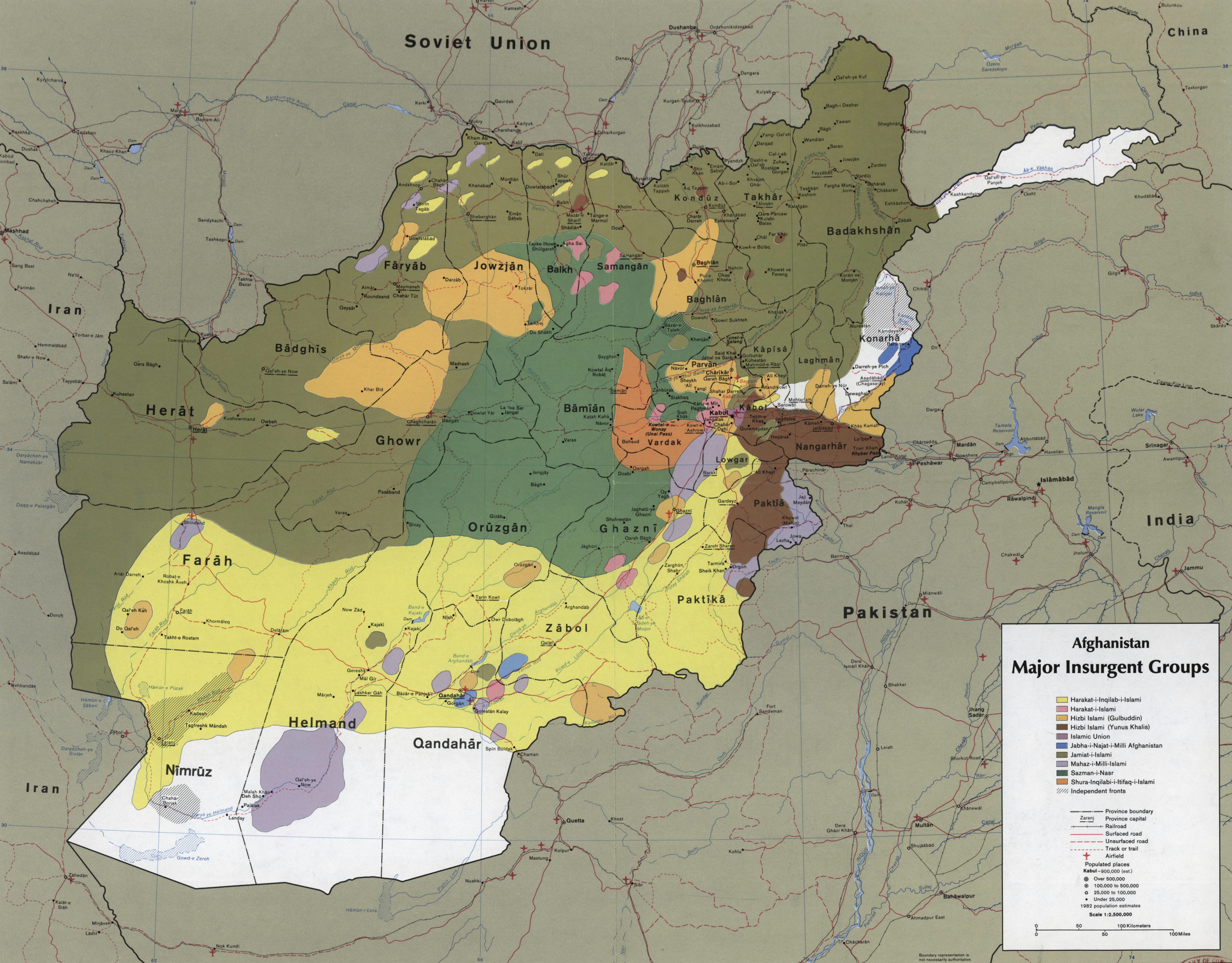
1985 CIA map of major Afghan mujahideen groups' territory

Bin Laden and Azzam founded Maktab al-Khidamat to recruit foreign mujahideen into the anti-Soviet resistance. The organization built up a large military force. It trained the volunteers to fight the Soviets and the Democratic Republic of Afghanistan. MaK paid for the volunteers' flight tickets and other travel services.

Bin Laden became acquainted with Hamid Gul, a Pakistani general and head of the ISI. Although the U.S. provided the mujahideen money and weapons, the militants' training was entirely done by the Pakistan Armed Forces and the ISI. Contrary to popular belief, the U.S. did not train or fund bin Laden's followers directly. However, bin Laden himself was trained by U.S. special forces commando Ali Mohamed. According to Brigadier Mohammad Yousaf, then-head of ISI's Afghanistan operations, Pakistan had a strict policy to prevent any American funding, arming, or training of mujahideen.

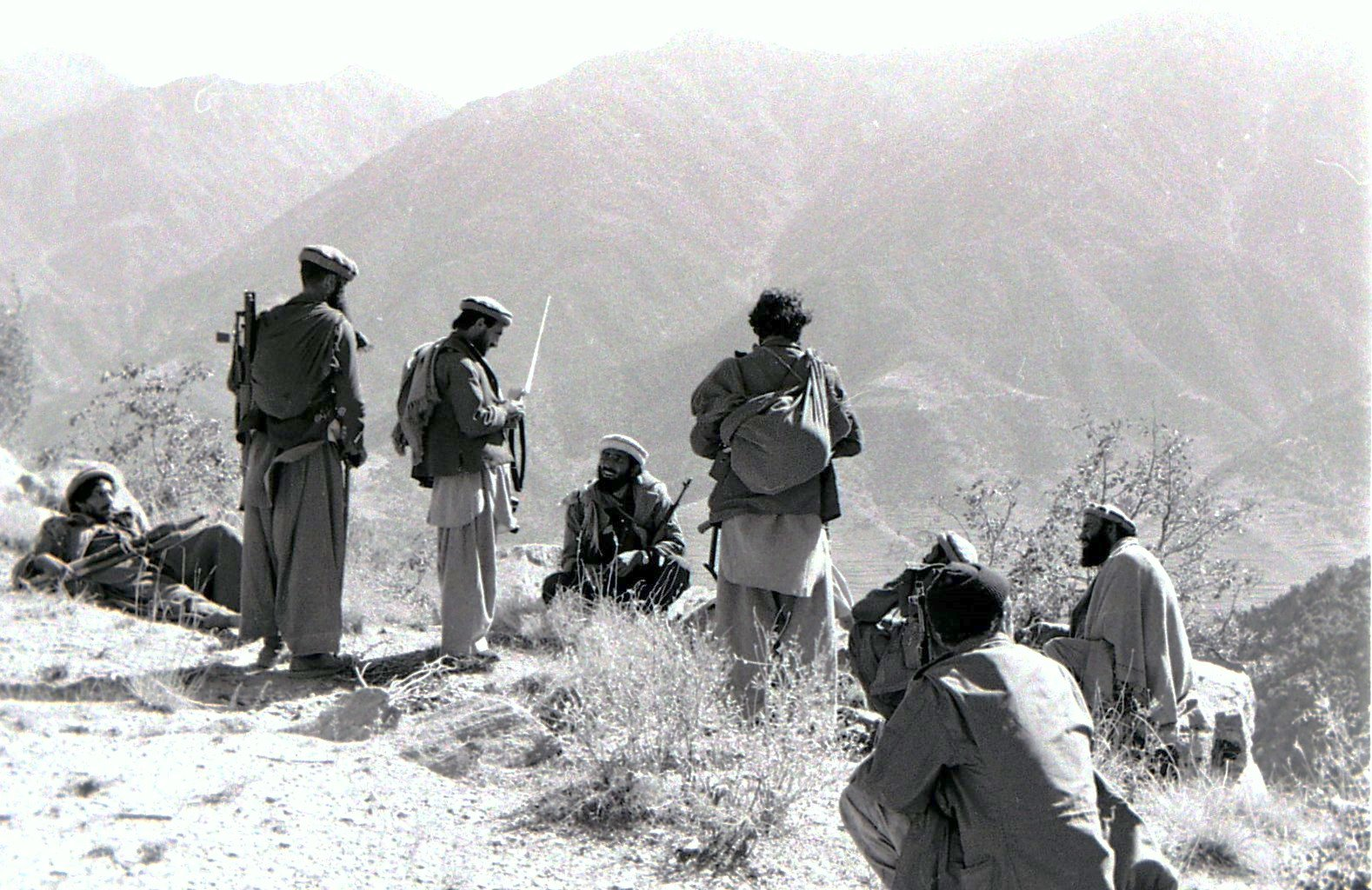
Mujahideen fighters in Afghanistan's Kunar Province in 1987

According to some CIA officers, beginning in early 1980, bin Laden acted as a liaison between the Saudi intelligence agency, the General Intelligence Presidency (GIP); and Afghan warlords. Journalist Steve Coll states that while bin Laden was likely not a salaried GIP agent, "it seems clear [that they] did have a substantial relationship."

Bin Laden, along with the CIA, helped build cave complexes in the mountains of Afghanistan for mujahideen to use as fortifications. Between 1986 and 1987, bin Laden set up a base in eastern Afghanistan for several dozen of his own soldiers. There, he participated in some combat against the Soviets, such as the Battle of Jaji in 1987. He also established camps in Khyber Pakhtunkhwa province in Pakistan.

Bin Laden split from MaK in 1988. This was largely due to him wanting the Arab fighters in the Afghan mujahideen to form a military force independent from the rest of the mujahideen, whereas Azzam wanted to integrate the groups. After the Soviets withdrew in February 1989, bin Laden returned to Saudi Arabia.

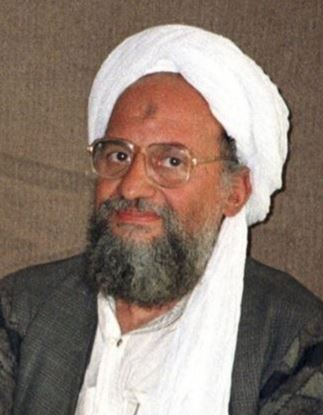
Ayman al-Zawahiri

Bin Laden and Azzam also differed over the use of MaK's militant force following the Soviet withdrawal. Bin Laden, alongside the Egyptian Islamic Jihad (EIJ) terrorist group led by Ayman al-Zawahiri, agreed with Azzam that MaK should be used to defend any oppressed Muslims around the world. However, Azzam wanted to use the organization to help install an Islamic government in Afghanistan without a fitna—in this case, meaning an Islamic civil war. The other side wanted MaK to wage global jihad that would overthrow governments in Muslim-majority countries that they deemed un-Islamic. Bin Laden publicly urged MaK's soldiers to wage jihad through terrorism; Azzam issued a fatwa condemning this approach, saying Islamic law condemns the killing of women and children.

In Pakistan on 24 November, Azzam and his two sons began a trip to their local mosque for evening prayers, when all three were killed by the detonations of three land mines. Suspects include bin Laden, al-Zawahiri, competing Afghan militia leaders, the ISI, the CIA, the Israeli Mossad, Iranian intelligence, and the Afghan KhAD.< With Azzam's death, bin Laden assumed full control of MaK, which became absorbed into his organization al-Qaeda. The organization had been formed in 1988, perhaps on 11 August.

== United States operations ==
MaK established recruitment and fundraising offices in multiple Western countries, the U.S. being one of their main fund-raising destinations. On fundraising tours, Azzam visited the mosques of "Brooklyn, St. Louis, Kansas City, Seattle, Sacramento, Los Angeles, and San Diego – altogether there were 33 cities in America that opened branches of [MaK] in order to support the jihad."

Most MaK financiers and support networks fronting as charitable NGOs were shut down and designated shortly following the September 11 attacks and the subsequent signing of the Patriot Act.

=== Al Kifah Refugee Center ===
The first offices in the United States were established within the Al Kifah Refugee Center in Brooklyn, and at the Islamic Center in Tucson, Arizona. The center in Brooklyn was established in the mid-to-late 1980s, was originally operated by Mustafa Shalabi, a close associate of MaK's co-founder Abdullah Azzam. Al Kifah was originally established to aid the Afghan mujahideen, and garner both support and funding to fight the invading Soviets. By 1988, Shalabi had set up with two chief aids inside the Al-Farooq Mosque, one of whom, Mahmud Abouhalima, would later be arrested for the 1993 World Trade Center bombing in New York.

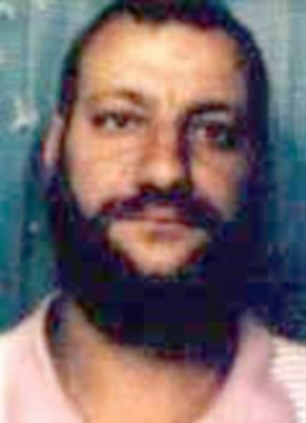
Mahmud Abouhalima

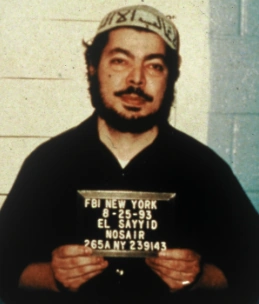
El Sayyid Nosair

By one account approximately 200 "young Arab Immigrants" went to see Shalabi about fighting in Afghanistan. Once enlisted, the prospective jihadists would be organized into groups of three or four and instructed to "pay their own way". However, before leaving, the recruits were given arms and combat training; one such recruit was El Sayyid Nosair, who received rifle training at the High Rock shooting range in Naugatuck, Connecticut, and went on to assassinate militant Rabbi Meir Kahane in New York in November 1990. In February 1991, Shalabi was found murdered inside his New York apartment.

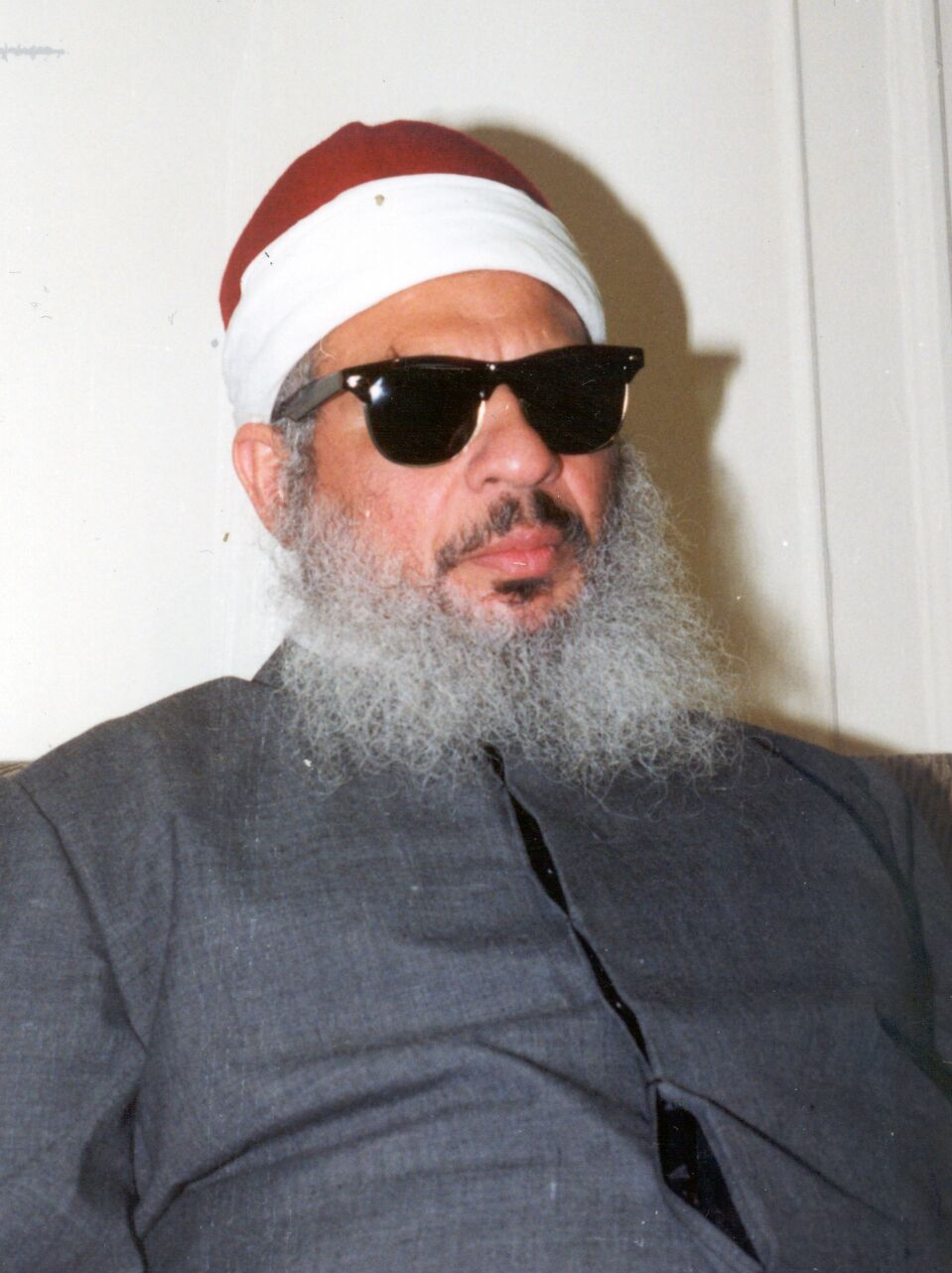
Omar Abdel-Rahman

It is believed that like Azzam, Shalabi had become embroiled in a power struggle with supporters of bin Laden, namely Omar Abdel-Rahman and his followers from the Al Farouq Mosque. In 1995, Abdel-Rahman was convicted for his part in the 'Day of Terror Plot', a plan to bomb various New York City landmarks. It is also alleged that Rahman had intimate knowledge of the World Trade Center bombing. The subsequent investigations by the FBI into the Al-Farooq Mosque and Al Kifah Refugee Centre effectively dismantled the New York office of MaK.

=== CARE International ===
Established in the early 1990s as the Boston branch of the Al Kifah Refugee Center, the head of the office, Emad Muntasser changed the name to CARE International Inc. following the World Trade Center bombing and dismantling of the Brooklyn office.

CARE International enlisted the use of various tactics in attempts to fundraise and recruit possible fighters. These tactics included, but were not limited to, dinner speeches and events at local mosques, donation "phonathons", open screenings of new Jihadist videos, a newsletter called "Al Hussam", and even university visits under the guise of Muslim Student Associations.

Muntasser applied for and was granted a tax exemption from the IRS as a "non-political charity", enabling the organization to receive tax-exempt donations from around the United States. CARE was able to raise almost $2 million through small donations.

In 2005 prosecutors charged Emmad Muntasser, Samir Al-Monta, and Mohammed Mubayyid with conspiracy to defraud the U.S. and engaging in a scheme to conceal information from the U.S.

=== IARA and ties to Mark Siljander ===
The Islamic African Relief Agency (IARA) was headquartered in Khartoum, Sudan, and established over 40 offices around the world, including the United States.

The U.S. Treasury Department designated as the Islamic African Relief Agency pursuant to Executive Order 13224 on October 13, 2004, for supporting bin Laden and MaK (and subsequently al-Qaeda). The designation cited one instance in which members of IARA accompanied MaK leaders on a fundraising trip to Sudan in which $5 million was raised for MaK.

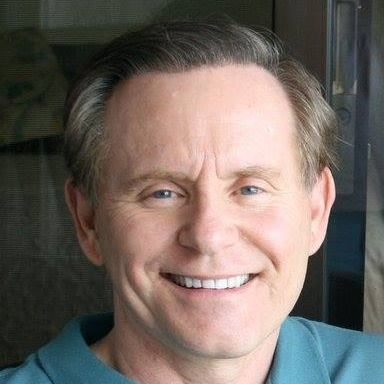
Mark D. Siljander

Mark Siljander, a former Republican Congressman from west Michigan was indicted on charges of money laundering and obstruction of justice. Siljander was given $50,000 in payment by the IARA to lobby for the group's removal from a U.S. Senate list of terrorist-linked charities in 2004; however, it is uncertain if he ever engaged in any such lobbying efforts. Siljander was sentenced to one year and one day of prison after pleading guilty to obstruction of justice and acting as an unregistered foreign agent.

One day, following the press release by the Department of Justice announcing Siljander's conviction, it released a statement of clarification regarding the former congressman's knowledge of the IARA: "the indictment does not charge any of the defendants with material support of terrorism, nor does it allege that they knowingly financed acts of terror. Instead, the indictment alleges that some of the defendants engaged in financial transactions that benefited property controlled by a designated terrorist, in violation of the International Emergency Economic Powers Act".

=== Global Relief Foundation ===
The Global Relief Foundation was a purported charitable, nonprofit organization that was established and headquartered in Bridgeview, Illinois in 1992. Self-claimed to be the second largest Muslim charity within the United States, the group claimed to have raised approximately $5 million a year.

The Department of Treasury designated the group under E.O. 13224, stating in October 2002 that it was aiding bin Laden and al-Qaeda, and other terrorist group. They also claimed that one of its founders was previously a member of MaK.

=== Benevolence International Foundation ===
Founded in Saudi Arabia in the late 1980s as "Lajnat Al-Birr al Islamiah" (LIB) by Sheik Adedl Abdul Galil Batterjee, the organization changed its name to Benevolence International Foundation (BIF) upon incorporating in Burbank, Illinois, in early 1992. During the Soviet–Afghan War, LIB, like other similar organizations helped to fund mujahideen fighters. However, after the war LIB, now operating as BIF, helped to establish and fund al-Qaeda.

Between 1993 and 2001 the Benevolence International Foundation is believed to have raised upwards of $17.5 million.

On November 19, 2002, the U.S. Treasury designated BIF as financiers of terrorism, citing the close relationship between BIF's CEO Enaam Arnaout and bin Laden.

== Alleged associates held at Guantanamo Bay ==
Serveral prisoners of the U.S.' Guantanamo Bay Detention Center in Cuba are confirmed or alleged to have had ties to MaK. Khalid al-Asmr admitted to working for MaK, specifically under Abdullah Azzam's wife, but only to engage in humanitarian work. He said that all his work was prior to 1992. Ahmed Hassan Jamil Suleyman was accused of being a member of MaK, but reportedly denied any involvement or knowledge of it to officials at Guantanamo. Mammar Ameur was accused by Guantanamo officials of staying at a guesthouse in Peshawar that "may have been funded by the MaK office in Peshawar".
