= Al Kifah Refugee Center =

United States charity

The Al Kifah Refugee Center is a charity that was active in the United States and was based in the Faruq Mosque in Brooklyn.

== Overview ==
Al Kifah Refugee Center had clandestine links to forces fighting in Afghanistan dating to the late 1980s, when the fighters enjoyed American support in their struggle against the Soviet occupiers. It is asserted that funds raised in the USA were covertly sent to Maktab al-Khidamat, an organization Osama bin Laden is said to have later transformed into al Qaeda.

Cooperative Research asserts that Ali Mohamed, an instructor at Fort Bragg offered military and demolition training through the center. They assert El-Sayyid Nosair recruited students for this military training conducted through the center. They assert that some of those involved in bombing of the World Trade Center received training from Ali Mohamed through the center.

Among the causes the center raised funds for was Bosnian orphans. Newsweek reported that Aafia Siddiqui, who disappeared when she fell under suspicion of ties to terrorism, made large donations to the Al Kifah Refugee Center and Benevolence International.
