= Wa'el Hamza Julaidan =

Saudi Arabian terrorist

- Born: 22 February 1958 (age 67)
- Other names: Arabic: وائل حمزة جليدان
- Known for: suspected of being a co-founder of al-Qaeda

Wa'el Hamza Julaidan (Arabic: وائل حمزة جليدان, kunya: Abu al-Hasan; born 22 February 1958 in Medina, Saudi Arabia) is one of the original founders of al-Qaeda in August 1988.

He had previously (1984) established "the Service Office" or Maktab al-Khidamat in Afghanistan, along with bin Laden and Abdullah Yusuf Azzam. Many of the supporters of al-Qaeda were trained in the Afghan military camps this trio set up in support of the mujahideen resistance movement against the Soviet occupation.

He was the president of the Tucson Islamic Center from 1984 to 1985. In 1986, he left Tucson to fight the Soviet invasion of Afghanistan. In 1987, he traveled to Hijaz, and was expected to return to Karachi.

For his suspected role in al-Qaeda, Julaidan was placed under worldwide embargo by the United Nations, in 2002. His UN embargo was lifted in 2014.
