= September 20, 2007, Osama bin Laden video =

Nine days after Osama bin Laden released his latest video, September 11, 2007 Osama bin Laden video, on the sixth anniversary of the September 11, 2001 attacks on New York and Washington, he released a new tape on September 20, 2007 called "Come to Jihad" with his voice over previously released footage of him. In the tape, bin Laden called on Pakistanis to overthrow President Pervez Musharraf, promising what he called retaliation for the storming of the Red Mosque in the capital, Islamabad, in July.

== Contents ==
Laura Mansfield provides the following quotes from the new Bin Laden message:

- regarding Pakistan's nuclear weapons program: "How is the nation benefited by these weapons and tests of yours? The same goes for the nuclear bomb itself."
- in conclusion: "And we in al-Qaida Organization call on Allah to witness that we will retaliate for the blood of Maulana Abdul Rashid Ghazi and those with him against Musharraf and those who help him, and for all the pure and innocent blood, foremost of which is the blood of the champions of Islam in Waziristan – both North and South – among them the two noble leaders, Nek Muhammad and Abdullah Mahsud. May Allah have mercy on them all."

== See also ==
- Videos and audio recordings of Osama bin Laden
- Videos and audio recordings of Ayman al-Zawahiri
- Messages to the World: The Statements of Osama bin Laden
