= September 11, 2007, Osama bin Laden video =

The September 11, 2007 Osama bin Laden video appeared five days after the September 6, 2007, Osama bin Laden video, on the sixth anniversary of the September 11 attacks. It is the second video produced by As-Sahab purportedly featuring a eulogy by Osama bin Laden to the 9/11 hijacker Waleed al-Shehri.

== Contents ==
In the video, a voice identified as bin Laden's delivers the 14-minute introduction. The voice is heard over a still picture of bin Laden, dressed and groomed as he appears in the September 6, 2007 video. The 33-minute balance of the recording is a video that will read by al-Shehri.

Some mainstream media outlets say that video lasts 47 minutes.

The title of the video is 'The Wills of the Heroes of the Raids on New York and Washington.'

According to CNN reporter Octavia Nasr:

"Although CNN could not independently confirm the authenticity of the video, it did feature the logo of As-Sahab Media, the company that traditionally handles al-Qaeda communications to the public. The 47-minute videotape was obtained by terrorism expert Laura Mansfield before it was to appear on several Islamist Web sites known for carrying statements from al Qaeda and other radical groups."

The voice-over is spoken in Arabic and is heard over a still picture of bin Laden and contains English subtitles.

Nasr goes on to state that:

"The balance of the recording is a video well read by al-Shehri, with 9/11 symbols in the background. He is the seventh of the 19 hijackers to appear in such a will since the terrorist attacks" and that "The voice and picture in the video sound and appear similar to a bin Laden video released late last week."

There is no indication that any part of the video was recorded recently. The only element tying it to somewhat-current events is in the introduction and the mention of the death of al-Qaeda in Iraq leader Abu Musab al-Zarqawi, who was killed during a U.S. raid in June 2006.

For several weeks, radical Islamist websites have been announcing that there would be "good news soon from Sheikh Osama bin Laden."

== See also ==
- Videos of Osama bin Laden
- Videos of Ayman al-Zawahiri
- Messages to the World: The Statements of Osama bin Laden (book published in 2005)
