= SITE Intelligence Group =

American non-governmental organization

SITE Intelligence Group is an American for-profit consultancy group that tracks online activity of white supremacist and jihadist organizations. It is led by the Israeli analyst Rita Katz and based in Bethesda, Maryland. From 2002 to 2008, Katz headed an organization called the SITE Institute.

The bulk of the materials on the SITE website are available by paid subscription.

== SITE Institute ==
The Search for International Terrorist Entities (SITE) Institute was an organization that tracked the online activity of terrorist organizations. The SITE Institute was founded in 2002 by Rita Katz and Josh Devon, who had left the Investigative Project, a private Islamist-terrorist tracking group. In early 2008, it ceased its operations, and some of its staff formed the SITE Intelligence Group, a for-profit entity, to continue some of its activities.

=== al-Qaeda tapes ===
- July 4, 2007: A video by Ayman al-Zawahiri was obtained by SITE ahead of its release on the internet by militant web sites. The video had been provided by al-Qaeda's As-Sahab Media to IntelCenter.
- Sept. 7, 2007: SITE obtained a 30-minute video of Osama bin Laden and provided it to Associated Press. Bin Laden's image is "frozen" for all but 3½ minutes of the tape. SITE beat al-Qaeda by nearly a full day with the release of the video. The US government later pronounced the video authentic.
- May 6, 2011: The organization translated a lengthy statement signed by al-Qaeda's General Command that confirmed the death of Osama bin Laden and promised retaliation.

== Controversies ==
=== As the institute ===
- On September 23, 2004, The New York Times'' reported "Several Islamic groups and charities...sued for defamation after (Katz) claimed they were terrorist fronts, even though they were not charged with a crime."
- On 30 May 2008, The Daily Telegraph published an online article reporting that SITE had wrongly identified footage from the post-apocalyptic computer game Fallout 3 as being created by terrorists considering a nuclear attack against the West. According to the article, SITE found the Fallout 3 images in a video called Nuclear Jihad: The Ultimate Terror, posted on two possibly al-Qaeda affiliated and password protected websites, where it also gleaned chat logs from users discussing nuclear attacks on the West. SITE released a statement to clarify its position, stating that it never claimed the images were produced by terrorists, although it didn't admit to knowing from the start that they were video game images. The Daily Telegraph subsequently removed the article from its website.

=== As the group ===
On September 2, 2014, SITE sent the video of Steven Sotloff's beheading to its subscribers before the Islamic State released the video.

== See also ==
- Internet Haganah
- The Jawa Report
- Jihad Watch
