= September 6, 2007, Osama bin Laden video =

The 2007 Osama bin Laden video originally appeared in a banner ad on an Islamic militant website regularly used by al-Qaeda on September 6, 2007. The ad carried a picture of bin Laden and the logo of al-Qaeda's media production company As-Sahab. An accompanying translated message read: "Soon, with the permission of God, a new visual tape, the Sheikh, the Lion, Osama bin Laden. May God protect him."

The timing of the video's release coincided with the 6th anniversary of the September 11 attacks on the United States. bin Laden's previous appearance in a video was in 2004.

By September 7, 2007, United States authorities had obtained a copy of the video, even though it hadn't been officially released. Soon after, the Reuters news agency released a 1-minute excerpt of the tape, which it had obtained from BNO News.

== Contents ==
Note: The following description was compiled after consideration of the video and transcript as hosted by The Counterterrorism Blog.

In the video, bin Laden is seated at a table wearing a white robe, turban, and beige cloak. His beard is shorter than in his 2004 video and is black, leading some to speculate that it had been dyed. The video's title "The Solution" appears in the top left corner of the video frame. The video running time is approximately 26 minutes.

Bin Laden addresses the "People of America" directly in the video, but he makes no direct threats to the United States. He criticizes perceived flaws in American society and US foreign policy, contrasting these with the perceived virtues of Islam. The September 11 attacks are mentioned several times, as is the Iraq War. The video concludes with a suggestion that Americans should convert to Islam.

Other events and themes in the video include:

- The 62nd anniversary of the US Atomic bombings of Hiroshima and Nagasaki
- The influence of the Democrat-controlled congress
- The influence of major corporations
- Global warming and the Kyoto Accord
- The war in Afghanistan
- The Dissolution of the Soviet Union
- The Kennedy Assassination
- The Vietnam War
- The extermination of Native American Indians
- The Spanish Inquisition
- The Capitalist / Communist governments who "take their people for fools"

Individuals mentioned in the video include:

- Former UK Prime Minister Tony Blair
- Former UK Prime Minister Gordon Brown
- Former French President Nicolas Sarkozy
- Author and political activist Noam Chomsky
- Author and former CIA analyst Michael Scheuer

He suggests that the viewer read the European thinker who anticipated the fall of the Soviet Union. Although not named, Bin Laden is believed to be referring to Emmanuel Todd and his book After the Empire: The Breakdown of the American Order.

Bin Laden suggests that notice should be taken of comments made by a US soldier serving in Iraq named Joshua:

It would benefit you to listen to the poignant messages of your soldiers in Iraq, who are paying – with their blood, nerves and scattered limbs....Among them is the eloquent message of Joshua which he sent by way of the media, in which he wipes the tears from his eyes and describes American politicians in harsh terms and invites them to join him there for a few days.

The soldier's comments were made in an ABC News story dated July 16, 2007, although Bin Laden attributes the remarks to Corporal Joshua Lake who appears in the story.

== Questions concerning authenticity ==
Several peculiarities in the video raise questions regarding its authenticity:

- Osama bin Laden has a trimmer, blacker beard and the same clothing he wore in the October 2004 video.
- All references to events current to the timing of the release of the video — such as the 62nd anniversary of the US atomic bombing of Japan, and Sarkozy and Brown being the leaders of France and the UK, respectively — occur when the video is frozen (rather than showing Bin Laden actually speaking of those events).

== Reaction to the video ==
President George W. Bush speaking from the APEC Summit in Sydney, Australia:

The tape is a reminder of the dangerous world in which we live and it is a reminder that we must work together to protect our people.

In the same speech:

I found it interesting that on the tape Iraq was mentioned, which is a reminder that Iraq is part of the war against extremists. If Al-Qaeda bothers to mention Iraq, it's because they want to achieve their objectives in Iraq, which is to drive us out.

Homeland Security Advisor Frances Townsend speaking to Fox News Sunday:

Remember, the last audiotape was in June of '06. The last video was just before the election in October of '04. This is about the best he can do. This is a man on the run, from a cave, who is virtually impotent other than these tapes.

Expert on Islamic issues Sliman Abu Rahman (based in Amman, Jordan) speaking to Al Jazeera:

In his earlier speeches he offered them a truce and now he is asking them to convert. I think this is very far from reality and no political organizing with realistic political objectives can have such an unacceptable political discourse.

Former CIA analyst Michael Scheuer speaking to Wolf Blitzer, anchor of CNN's The Situation Room:

Inherent in his request for us to convert (to Islam) is a very explicit threat that he is going to attack us in a very hard way. The prophet told Muslims before you attack anyone you warn them, offer them a chance to convert and offer them truces.

Scheuer also provided a more detailed analysis at the Jamestown Foundation site.

Security analyst M.J. Gohel of the Asia-Pacific Foundation speaking to The Washington Post:

This has the language and hallmarks of Adam Gadahn and is very reminiscent of his own messages in terms of style and content.

== Second video ==
On September 11, 2007, a second video appeared, purportedly featuring a eulogy by Osama bin Laden for 9/11 hijacker Waleed al-Shehri. In the video, a voice identified as bin Laden's delivers a 14-minute introduction. The voice is heard over a still picture of bin Laden, dressed and groomed as he appears in the September 7, 2007 video. The 33-minute balance is a video recording of al-Shehri reading his will.

== See also ==
- Videos of Ayman al-Zawahiri
- 2004 Osama bin Laden video
- Videos of Osama bin Laden
- Messages to the World: The Statements of Osama bin Laden
