= Abd al-Rahman al-Maghrebi =

Moroccan al-Qaeda member

- عبد الرحمن المغربي
- Born: Mohamed Abattay; 1970 or 1975; Marrakesh, Morocco
- Citizenship: Morocco
- Education: Hochschule Niederrhein
- Occupation: Global terrorist
- Years active: 1999–present
- Organization: Al-Qaeda
- Spouse: Nabila al-Zawahiri
- Relatives: Ayman al-Zawahiri (father-in-law)

Abd al-Rahman al-Maghrebi (Arabic: عبد الرحمن المغربي; born 1970 or 1975) is a Moroccan-born Salafi jihadist and senior member of Al-Qaeda (AQ) who leads the organization's External Communications Office, including As-Sahab Media. He is the son-in-law of the group's late emir Ayman al-Zawahiri, and is seen as a potential successor to Saif al-Adel as leader of the terror group.

Though primarily known by a nom de guerre which references his Moroccan birthplace, his given name is Mohamed Abattay (Arabic: محمد أبطاي). After his radicalization in the late 1990s, al-Maghrebi abandoned his schooling in Germany and departed for the infamous Al Farouq training camp outside Kandahar, Afghanistan, where he was hand-picked by Khalid Sheikh Mohammed for work in the groups propaganda arm.

Following the September 11 attacks, al-Maghrebi is believed to have quickly fled to Iran. He subsequently rose through the ranks of Al-Qaeda, gaining trust, and winning the hand of Zawahiri's daughter in marriage. By 2012, al-Maghrebi had become al-Qaeda's general manager for all of Afghanistan and Pakistan. The US moved to designate al-Maghrebi a Specially Designated Global Terrorist in early 2021. After the Taliban's return to power in August of that year, al-Maghrebi was believed to have been living together with Zawahiri in the same house in downtown Kabul where Zawahiri would later be killed in a U.S. drone strike. As of 2023 his whereabouts are unknown.

== Early life and education ==
Al-Maghrebi was born Mohamed Abattay in Marrakesh, Morocco. He left Morocco for Germany in 1996, where he studied computer programming and electrical engineering in Cologne at the Hochschule Niederrhein University of Applied Sciences.

== Militant career ==
While studying in Germany, al-Maghrebi joined a group of Muslim students that grew increasingly radical and that later pledged allegiance to Osama bin Laden. The group, based in Krefeld, included Christian Ganczarski, who has been charged by the United States for his involvement in the Ghriba synagogue bombing.

In 1999, al-Maghrebi left for Afghanistan, where he trained at the Al Farouq training camp. He was pulled from training by Khalid Sheikh Mohammed, and was later reassigned to work at al-Qaeda's Media Committee. According to the FBI, al-Maghrebi fled to Iran soon after the 9/11 terrorist attacks.

In 2012, he started serving as al-Qaeda's general manager in Afghanistan and Pakistan and ran As-Sahab, al-Qaeda's media branch.

== Designations ==
On January 12, 2021, the U.S. Department of State designated al-Maghrebi as a Specially Designated Global Terrorist, the U.S. Treasury’s Office of Foreign Assets Control added him to the Specially Designated Nationals and Blocked Persons List. The Department of State's Rewards for Justice Program is offering a reward of up to $7 million for information on al-Maghrebi. On April 7, 2022, he was designated as a terrorist entity by the Moroccan Ministry of Justice, who claimed that he was living in Iran.

Al-Maghrebi is seen as a potential successor to Saif al-Adel as Emir of al-Qaeda.

== Personal life ==
Abattay is married to Ayman al-Zawahiri's daughter, Nabila. Abbatay was reported to be living in the Kabul house where al-Zawahiri was killed in 2022.

== See also ==
- Saif al-Adel
- Ali Khamenei
