= IntelCenter =

American company working for intelligence agencies

- Industry: Intelligence
- Founded: 1989
- Headquarters: Alexandria, Virginia
- Key people: Ben N. Venzke, CEO

IntelCenter is a United States company, founded in 1989. It is based near Washington, D.C., in Alexandria, Virginia.

The company "is a private contractor working for intelligence agencies". Its stated purpose is to "study terrorist groups and other threat actors and disseminating that information in a timely manner to those who can act on it. We look at capabilities and intentions, warnings and indicators, operational characteristics and a wide variety of other points in order to better understand how to interdict terrorist operations and reduce the likelihood of future attacks."

IntelCenter has a sister company, Tempest Publishing. The company's CEO is Ben N. Venzke.

== Al-Qaeda tapes ==
IntelCenter has provided several video tapes to the Western press that show professed al-Qaeda members, including the following.

- April 2006: A video featuring Qaeda no. 2 Ayman al-Zawahiri, in which he said the US military had "seen only 'loss, disaster and misfortune' in Iraq". It "was first obtained by IntelCenter".
- In June 2006, a video of "20th hijacker" Fawaz al-Nashimi, who died in a shootout in Saudi Arabia in 2004, "was released by IntelCenter".
- On 30 September 2006, an 18-minute al-Qaeda tape in which Al-Zawahiri called Bush "a deceitful charlatan". It was "made available" by Intelcenter.
- On 2 October 2006, IntelCenter and Venzke were again referenced as a source in an article detailing a silent Al Qaeda video recently released in which two 9/11 hijackers, Mohamed Atta, and Ziad Al-Jarrah, read their last wills and testaments.
- 27 April 2007: A file picture "released by the IntelCenter of leading Al-Qaeda operative in Afghanistan Abu Laith al-Libi during an interview". As-Sahab logo on picture. (From a video.)
- On 4 July 2007, an al-Zawahiri video was "provided by al-Qaeda's As-Sahab Media to ... IntelCenter". Another US-based intelligence group, SITE, "said it had obtained the tape ahead of its release on the internet by militant web sites". The video was "first reported by IntelCenter and SITE".
- On 11 September 2007, a "video" of bin Laden with an IntelCenter credit appeared on the news. The visuals consisted of a still picture of Osama (similar to, or the same as, the "frozen" image on the video "provided" by SITE to Associated Press on 7 Sept. 2007). The video also contained footage of Waleed al-Shehri, one of the 9/11 hijackers. See also Sept 11 2007 Osama bin Laden video.
- 14 September 2007: A video of a dead US pilot, bearing the insignia of the "Islamic State of Iraq", an al-Qaeda affiliate. It "was first obtained by IntelCenter".
- 2 April 2008: An online audiofile, in which Al-Zawahiri called the United Nations an enemy of Islam, was released via IntelCenter by As-Sahab (according to IntelCenter).

IntelCenter offers "Qaeda" tapes for sale on its website.

=== Question of authenticity ===
Neal Krawetz did an error level analysis of the As-Sahab and IntelCenter logos on "a 2006 al Qaeda video of Ayman al-Zawahiri". He originally told Kim Zetter of Wired News that the logos had "the same error levels and that this indicated they were added at the same time" (Zetter's words). IntelCenter boss Venzke subsequently denied that his organization had added the As-Sahab logo. He commented: "just because the error levels are the same for two items in an image, that doesn't prove they were added at the same time, only that the compression was the same for both items when they were added" (Zetter's words). Krawetz then went back on his original statement, saying that "the error levels on the IntelCenter and As-Sahab logos are different and that the IntelCenter logo was added after the As-Sahab logo" (Zetter's words again).

IntelCenter has not revealed how it acquires these videos or explained the discrepancies of the As-Sahab and IntelCenter logos.
