= Nabila al-Zawahiri =

Daughter of Ayman al-Zawahiri

- نبيلة الظواهري
- Born: 1986 (age 38–39); Afghanistan (suspected)
- Organization: Al Qaeda
- Spouse: Abd al-Rahman al-Maghrebi
- Parents: Ayman al-Zawahiri (father); Azza Ahmed Nowari (mother)
- Relatives: Fatima (b. 1981); Umayma (b.1983); Khadiga (b. 1987); Mohammed (b. 1987, d. 2001); Aisha (b. 1997, d. 2001); Nawwar (b. 2005; half sister)

Nabila al-Zawahiri (Arabic: نبيلة الظواهري, romanized: ʾNabila al-Ẓawāhirī, born 1986) is the daughter of Al-Qaeda co-founder Ayman al-Zawahiri and the wife of the group's external communications chief, Abd al-Rahman al-Maghrebi.

== Biography ==
Nabila was the third daughter born to Ayman al-Zawahiri and his first wife, Azza Ahmed Nowari, likely born in Afghanistan amid the Soviet–Afghan war. A deeply conservative and modest woman, Azza died following a US airstrike in Gardez, Afghanistan in 2001, after being pinned down by rubble and refusing rescue to avoid her face being seen by male rescuers. Ayman was killed in a CIA drone strike in Kabul, Afghanistan in 2022. Nabila has three living sisters and one half sister. Two other siblings died in the events surrounding the 2001 US airstrike which precipitated her mother's death. Mohammed died immediately of blast injuries, Aisha, a four year old sister who had Down syndrome, froze to death waiting for rescue.
