= Abu Turab al-Urduni =

Jordanian member of al-Qaeda

The son-in-law of Ayman al-Zawahiri, Abu Turab al-Urduni (Abu Turab the Jordanian) was a Jordanian who has been described by the United States government as one of five individuals who were aware of the operational details of the September 11 attacks, along with Osama bin Laden, Khalid Sheik Mohammed, Ramzi bin al-Shibh, and Mohammed Atef. US intelligence reports indicated that he was killed by US troops in 2001.

== Training ==
He has been described as the trainer of the "muscle" hijackers at the al-Matar complex and training them to disarm air marshals, physical fitness and basic English phrases. He also prepared them for truck bombing, blowing up buildings, and hijacking trains for operational security, so they wouldn't be able to reveal their target if they were captured.

At al-Faruq camp, he had each hijacker butcher a sheep and a camel with a Swiss army knife to prepare them for using their knives during the hijackings.

== Aftermath ==
CNN reports anonymous government sources as believing that Abu Turab Al-Urduni had been killed by U.S. forces during the first stages of the war in Afghanistan.

In September 2006, Abu Turab was shown in a video released by as-Sahab that showed the training and preparations for the September 11 attacks. It also demonstrated that he had taught them how to falsify documents, and suggested that he had later died fighting in Kandahar.
