= Internet Haganah =

Global intelligence network

Internet Haganah was a "global intelligence network dedicated to confronting Internet activities by Islamists and their supporters, enablers and apologists".

Internet Haganah also was an activist organization which attempts to convince businesses not to provide web-based services to such groups, and collects intelligence to store and pass on to government organizations. It was formed by Aaron Weisburd, an American computer programmer from Illinois, in 2002, and became part of a collection of private anti-terrorist web monitoring companies, including "Terrorism Research Center", "Search for International Terrorist Entities Institute", and "Northeast Intelligence Network". Weisburd was the only full-time employee of Internet Haganah, which was run primarily from his home office, with the help of many online associates.

== The organization ==
Haganah is a Hebrew word meaning 'defense'. Haganah is also the name of the early Zionist militia originally formed to defend Jewish settlers in British Mandate Palestine, and which evolved into what is now the Israel Defense Forces.

There are two main parts to Internet Haganah:

1. A small, global band of researchers, consultants, analysts and translators, who "associate and collaborate with each other as necessitated by our common desire to do more than just watch Islamists as they use the Internet. We [Internet Haganah] share an understanding that a jihad, or holy war, has been declared against the West, and these jihadists need to be met on whatever field of battle they may appear."
2. The parent organization is The Society for Internet Research.

== Operation ==
The organization says it has taken down more than 1,000 Jihad sites. Their success logo was a blue drawing of an AK-47.

To target websites perceived as threats, the organization relies upon its web community to find jihadists, and use a free "whois" service to determine if a US-based server hosts them. If so, as in the case of mawusat.com and its host Go Daddy, Internet Haganah operatives express concern about the nature of the site and ask the host to remove it. If this does not work and if the site concerns the US State Department's list of Foreign Terrorist Organizations, or the US Treasury's Office of Foreign Asset Control's list of Specially Designated Nationals and Blocked Persons, Internet Haganah contacts the banks and financiers of the host, who could face serious penalties for engaging in unreported transactions with the suspect website. If all else fails, the media may be contacted.

However, their targets often find countermeasures against these actions. In the case of GoDaddy.com and mawusat.com, the site was attacked, but appeared on a different server within a week. Newsweek reported:

It’s no coincidence, they argue, that in just the past year, Islamists have gotten savvier in their use of the Internet. In early 2004, Iraqi insurgent Abu Mussab al-Zarqawi and his group posted the video of the execution of Nicholas Berg, an American contractor working in Iraq, to one Web site, which was quickly overwhelmed with traffic. Today, jihadis post evidence of their operations on dozens of sites and coordinate their operations on secret e-mail lists, password-protected Web sites and audio chat services like PalTalk, which don’t leave behind a printed record. “The level of sophistication of these groups has become just unbelievable,”says Rita Katz, who monitors Islamic Internet activities as director of the D.C.-based Site Institute.

– Stone, Brad (July 13, 2005.)

== Founder ==
A. Aaron Weisburd is a "half-Irish, half-Jewish New Yorker" in Carbondale, Illinois. He was a philosophy major at George Washington University. He is the founder and Director of Internet Haganah, and also of the Society for Internet Research.

== Press coverage ==
Internet Haganah has received press coverage from such publications as Wired News and Newsweek. A profile of Internet Haganah and their conflict with Islamist hacker Irhabi 007 was featured in the July/August 2006 of The Atlantic. Haganah has also been reported on by a Hamas newspaper.

Internet Haganah was identified by Media Matters for America as one of the sources to use the term "Obama Intifada", a term critical of U.S. President Barack Obama's policies on Israel.

== See also ==
- Jewish Internet Defense Force
- The Jawa Report
- Jihad Watch
