= Videos and audio recordings of Ayman al-Zawahiri =

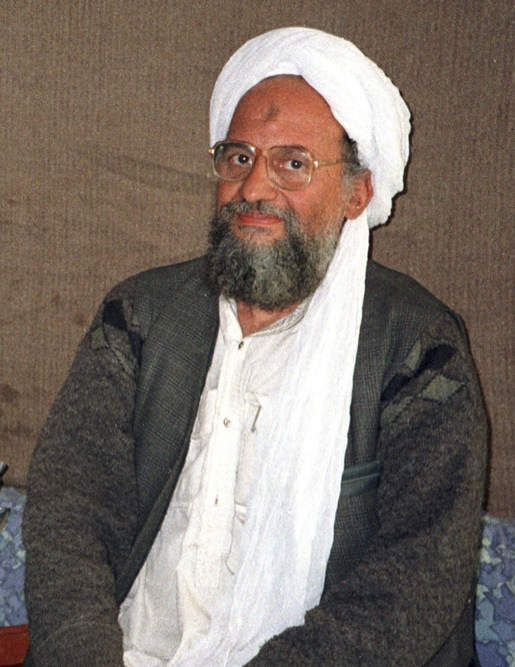
Ayman al-Zawahiri

There have been several video and audio recordings featuring former al-Qaeda leader Ayman al-Zawahiri between 2003 until his death in 2022.

== Videos and audio recordings released ==
=== May 17, 2003 ===
This video featuring al-Zawahiri referenced "Norway" multiple times and instructed to "Raize/Singe the floor right out from under their feet... the political and corporate interests... of the United States and Norway", which caused evacuation of American consulates in Norway and lock-down of Norwegian presence globally.

=== September 10, 2003 ===
Al Jazeera broadcast footage of Osama bin Laden and al-Zawahiri hiking in the mountains.

=== January 6, 2006 ===
Al-Zawahiri says U.S. president George W. Bush's plan to withdraw troops from Iraq means Washington had been defeated in Iraq. al-Zawahiri is quoted as saying, "Bush, you must confess that you have been defeated in Iraq and in Afghanistan and you will be in Palestine soon." al-Zawahiri also conveys his condolences to the people of Pakistan struck by the catastrophic 2005 Kashmir earthquake.

=== January 30, 2006 ===
In a video broadcast by Al Jazeera, al-Zawahiri mocks George W. Bush and brands him the "Butcher of Washington." The video also proves that he was not killed in a recent Pakistan airstrike. al-Zawahiri pro that the next terrorist attack would be on U.S. soil.

=== April 27, 2006 ===
Al-Zawahiri says in a video that the terror network's branch in Iraq has succeeded in "breaking the back" of the U.S. military with hundreds of suicide bombings.

=== June 9, 2006 ===
In a video broadcast by Al Jazeera, al-Zawahiri praised the work of Abu Musab al-Zarqawi, who was killed by two 500 lbs bombs in an isolated safehouse in Baqubah, Iraq. In the following statements, al-Qaeda still proposed to carry out imminent terrorist attacks, including in New York City and London.

=== June 22, 2006 ===
Al-Zawahiri urged Afghans to fight foreign soldiers in Afghanistan

=== July 7, 2006 ===
One year after the train bombings in London, al-Zawahiri reveals that two of the suicide bombers were trained by al-Qaeda in Pakistan.

=== July 27, 2006 ===
Al-Zawahiri shows his support for the insurgents in Gaza and South Lebanon.

=== August 5, 2006 ===
Al-Zawahiri appears in a video in which Muhammad Khalil al-Hukaymah claims that al-Qaeda has joined forces with al-Gama'a al-Islamiyya, and says that the 2 groups will form "one line, facing its enemies".

=== September 10, 2006 ===
A video-interview with al-Zawahiri of over an hour length is published on several internet sites. He makes reference to the situations in Gaza, Lebanon, Somalia, and to the historic figure William Brydon. On the fifth anniversary of his terror network's most infamous attacks, al-Zawahiri appears in a video carried by al-Jazeera. The video follows others appearing in the weeks before, but makes specific reference to recent events in Lebanon and the kidnapping of Israeli soldiers by militants. Ayman al-Zawahiri warns of new attacks in the Persian Gulf and Israel.

=== September 29, 2006 ===
Al-Zawahiri commented in a video message on the recent Pope Benedict XVI Islam controversy. He called the pope a charlatan, but he didn't call for any action.

=== December 20, 2006 ===
Al-Zawahiri speaks out against early elections for the Palestinian Authority.

=== January 5, 2007 ===
Al-Zawahiri showed his support for the Islamic Courts Union after the intervention of Ethiopia in Somalia.

=== January 22, 2007 ===
Al-Zawahiri ridicules the U.S.' Iraq War troop surge.

=== March 11, 2007 ===
Al-Zawahiri criticized Hamas for its compromise with Fatah to form a coalition government for the Palestinian Authority.

=== May 5, 2007 ===
Al-Zawahiri speaks out against the funding bill passed by the U.S. Congress and later vetoed by George W. Bush that would've set dates for troop withdrawals, saying, "This bill will deprive us of the opportunity to destroy the American forces which we have caught in a historic trap."

=== July 5, 2007 ===
Al Jazeera shows a new video from al-Zawahiri.

=== July 10, 2007 ===
A video in which al-Zawahiri condemns the actions of the U.K. for giving Salman Rushdie a knighthood. He states that al-Qaeda will give a "very precise response" and he also warns Gordon Brown, the new Prime Minister, that he must "learn" from the mistakes of his predecessor Tony Blair or they will be ready to repeat the attacks (reference to 7/7).

=== September 19, 2007 ===
On Thursday, September 19, al-Zawahiri also released a video calling for Jihad in Pakistan and around the world. The video was called “The Power of Truth” – Video Documentary from as-Sahab on the War Between Islam and the United States and the West

On September 19, 2007, al-Zawahiri reported, via public video, that the U.S. was being defeated in Afghanistan, Iraq and other places. Video

The 80-minute video took the form of a documentary, interspersing speech by al-Zawahiri with footage from the September 11 attacks, interviews with experts and officials taken from western and Arab television stations, and old footage and audiotapes of Bin Laden.

Al-Zawahiri began by condemning the Pakistani military's July assault on Islamic militants who took over the Red mosque, and paid tribute to one of the militants' leaders, Abdul Rashid Ghazi, who was killed in the fighting.

The siege "revealed the extent of the despicableness, lowliness and treason of Musharraf and his forces, who don't deserve the honour of defending Pakistan, because Pakistan is a Muslim land, whereas the forces of Musharraf are hunting dogs under Bush's crucifix", al-Zawahiri said.

=== November 2, 2007 ===
An audiotape from al-Zawahiri has been published in which he announced that a Libyan group joined al-Qaeda. He called for the removal of Libyan leader Gaddafi and to overthrow the governments of several other North-African countries.

=== December 14, 2007 ===
An audio recording titled "Annapolis: The Betrayal" and released on Dec. 14 was made by al-Zawahiri. in the recording, al-Zawahiri condemned the recent Israeli-Palestinian peace summit in Annapolis, Maryland and insisted that it was time for Palestinians to recognize "who your real brothers are—those who haven’t abandoned you, even though you accused them of terrorism and radicalism. [They] won't stop working to free Palestine and encouraging the Islamic nation to do the same, even if you flatter the West by condemning them.”

=== December 16, 2007 ===
A videotape in which al-Zawahiri said the decision of U.K. forces to "flee" Basra shows that Iraqi insurgents are gaining strength.

=== February 27, 2008 ===
A videotape in which al-Zawahiri pays tribute to Al Libi has been released

=== March 23, 2008 ===
On March 23, 2008, al-Zawahiri released a tape entitled "A Call to Help Our People in Gaza". During his speech, al-Zawahiri called upon Muslims everywhere to “attack the interests of the Jews and the Americans… Select your targets, collect the appropriate funds, assemble your equipment, plan [your attacks] accurately, and then charge towards your targets… There is no place today for those who claim that the battlefield with the Jews is limited to Palestine… Let us hit their interests everywhere.”

=== April 2, 2008 ===
On April 2, al-Zawahiri released the first part of his Q&A with the general public and journalists, entitled "The Open Meeting – Part 1". Advertisements for submitting questions were international. It was a 90-minute audio recording. During the recording, al-Zawahiri responded to many of the hundreds of questions recently submitted on extremist web forums by al-Qaeda supporters and other interested parties.

=== April 17, 2008 ===
On April 17, al-Zawahiri released a new audio recording entitled "On the Fifth Anniversary of the Invasion and Torture of Iraq". In the recording, al-Zawahiri boasted, "the first signs of victory have already appeared… Soon, Iraq will become a fortress of Islam, from whence the squadrons and regiments tasked with liberating the Al-Aqsa Mosque [in Jerusalem] will burst forth, with the help of Allah. Iraq today is the most important frontline for the participation of our Islamic nation against the forces of the crusader zionist invasion. Due to this, providing assistance to the mujahideen in Iraq—at their head, the Islamic State of Iraq (ISI)—is one of the most important duties required of the Islamic nation today.” Al-Zawahiri further warned that Muslims "should act now before it is too late. The vanguard should act before we see General Petraeus riding into the streets of Cairo and Riyadh leading ‘Awakening movements’ seeking to spill blood, and storm and violate the holy places.”

=== April 21, 2008 ===
On April 21, 2008, al-Zawahiri released the second and final part of his Q&A with the general public and journalists, entitled "The Open Meeting – Part 2". Advertisements for submitting questions were international. In the recording, al-Zawahiri responded to many of the hundreds of questions recently submitted on extremist web forums by al-Qaeda supporters and other interested parties. This time there al-Zawahiri made no English translation made available with a document or subtitles as with the first. Part 2 of al-Zawahiri's "Town Hall" meeting where he answers questions posted by visitors to the jihadist forums has just been released. The question and answer format was released in audio format in Arabic, with a 79-page Arabic language transcript. No English transcript was provided.

=== June 4, 2008 ===
On June 4, 2008, al-Zawahiri released a message marking the anniversary of the start of the 1967 Arab-Israeli War called Lift the Siege of Gaza

=== July 4, 2008 ===
A new video of al-Zawahiri was released on July 4, 2008.

=== August 10, 2008 ===
A video of al-Zawahiri speaking English was released on August 10, 2008.

=== September 9, 2008 ===
On September 9, 2008, a new video released on Al Jazeera condemning Shiite nations for not encouraging jihad and accusing Iran of collaborating with the United States in occupying Iraq and Afghanistan.

=== November 19, 2008 ===
A video, with English subtitles, was released severely criticizing President-elect Barack Obama. He also made references to Malcolm X and said Obama, Colin Powell and Condoleezza Rice fit Malcolm X's description of "house Negroes." Additionally, he spoke of American defeat in Iraq and Afghanistan as well as encouraging more resistance to America, the "trespassing Crusader".

=== June 2, 2009 ===
Al-Zawahiri released the message one day before bin Laden released his message. In the message, he criticized U.S. President Barack Obama, saying he was not welcome in Egypt, where he went to give a speech.

=== July 14, 2009 ===
In this tape, al-Zawahiri urges Pakistanis to support the Taliban.

=== December 14, 2009 ===
In an audio recording released on December 14, 2009, Zawahiri renewed calls to establish an Islamic state in Israel and urged his followers to “seek jihad against Jews” and their supporters. He also called for jihad against America and the West, and labeled Egyptian president Hosni Mubarak, King Abdullah II of Jordan and King Abdullah bin Abdulaziz of Saudi Arabia as the “brothers of Satan.”

=== May 20, 2010 ===
In an audio recording released on May 20, 2010, al-Zawahiri spoke on the recently killed leaders of the Islamic State of Iraq, Abu Ayyub al-Masri and Abu Omar al-Baghdadi. Al-Zawahiri likened them to Abu Musab al-Zarqawi, who created the group and was killed in a 2006 U.S. airstrike, crediting them with reviving jihad in Iraq.

=== July 20, 2010 ===
In this new audio tape, al-Zawahiri called many Arab leaders who were helping Israel's siege of the Gaza Strip "Zionists". Since he says "Arab Zionists are more dangerous than Jewish Zionists", this is meant to be inflammatory. In the tape, al-Zawahiri accuses King Abdullah II of Jordan, then King of Saudi Arabia Abdullah, and Palestinian president Mahmoud Abbas of being "Zionists". He also specifically calls out Egypt for planning to build an underground metal fence with Gaza to curb cross-border smuggling. He condemns Arab leaders collectively for backing the Saudi-drafted peace initiative, first presented in 2002, which offered Israel full recognition conditional on withdrawal from occupied territories and just settlement for refugees. Al-Zawahiri went on to mock Obama's statement that the Taliban would not gain power in Afghanistan, and ended by vowing allegiance to, and congratulating on his "steadfastness", Mullah Omar, then the leader of the Taliban.

=== July 27, 2010 ===
In the 47-minute recording, al-Zawahiri said the drive by France and other European nations to ban the veil amounted to discrimination against Muslim women. He slammed France's push to ban the Islamic full-face veil and urged Muslim women to be "holy warriors" in the defense of their headdress against the "secular Western crusade" in a new audio message released Wednesday on militant websites. Al-Zawahiri also eulogized the network's No. 3 official, Mustafa al-Yazid, who was killed along with his family in a U.S. strike in Pakistan in May. Al-Zawahiri praised what he called al-Yazid's achievements in Afghanistan and claimed that although killed al-Qaeda militants in Iraq outnumber U.S. soldiers 100-to-1, it is the U.S. that is withdrawing its troops from Iraq. He said the latest terror attacks against the U.S., including a May 1 attempted car bombing in New York City's Times Square, were in response to the presence of foreign troops in Muslim nations like Iraq and Afghanistan. In his audiotape, al-Zawahiri also talked about a wide range of topics in the Middle East such as democratic reforms in his native Egypt. He said that holy war was the only way to achieve reforms, not peaceful calls for reforms or elections. Al-Zawahiri also addressed Yemenis, urging them to wage attacks against U.S. targets and the Yemeni government.

=== August 15, 2010 ===
In a 20-minute Arabic audio message posted on an Islamist website, al-Zawahiri also offered condolences to the families of Turkish activists killed by Israel during a raid on a Gaza bound aid flotilla. He called on Turks to pressure their government to end relations with Israel. He accused Turkey of killing Muslims in Afghanistan.

=== September 15, 2010 ===
In an audio tape released on September 15, 2010, al-Zawahiri made a thinly veiled call on Pakistanis to rise up against their government over what he said was the "failure" of authorities there to provide relief to flood victims. Al-Zawahiri also accused the Islamabad government of corruption. Al-Zawahiri directed his harshest criticism at Pakistan's president, Asif Ali Zardari, describing him as a "thief" too preoccupied with mending his ties with the West to care about flood victims at home.

=== November 4, 2010 ===
In an audio tape, al-Zawahiri called on Muslims to avenge the sentencing of Aafia Siddiqui, a Pakistani scientist jailed for 86 years by a U.S. court, the SITE monitoring service said. The audio message was called "Who Will Avenge the Scientist Aafia Siddiqui," which was released on jihadist forums, the SITE Intelligence Group said. He promised "to attack … (Americans) as long as they attack" Muslims and said "the ummah (Islamic nation) will not stop pursuing you." And al-Zawahiri told Pakistanis their "government humiliated them by letting the Americans and Crusaders occupy the country." He called for them to "take the only available path, that of jihad... which will liberate Aafia Siddiqui."

=== February 4, 2011 ===
An audio message from al-Zawahiri was released on the internet, the first message from al-Qaeda since the unrest in Egypt began. The 34-minute message from al-Zawahiri addressed the corruption of the Egyptian regime and denounced the government of President Hosni Mubarak for resisting Islamic law.

=== February 27, 2011 ===
Al-Zawahiri said that the United States is installing sympathetic new regimes in Tunisia and Egypt, demanding Muslims rise up against "whippers" and "invaders". Railing against Washington, al-Zawahiri also said Tunisians should resist "the French occupier" and establish "a rule that will be a role model of counselling and justice for your brothers". The U.S. had abandoned Tunisia's long-time president Zine El Abidine Ben Ali in mid-January when it became clear that he had become a liability. Al-Zawahiri said a "secular alternative" was emerging in the shape of Mohamed ElBaradei, the former Vienna-based UN atomic chief.

=== April 14, 2011 ===
Al-Zawahiri incites Muslims to rise up against both NATO and Muammar Gaddafi's forces in a newly released video apparently taped before the Western intervention in Libya. Al-Zawahiri, wearing a white robe, was speaking in a one-hour and nine minute video produced by al-Qaeda's media arm, as-Sahab, according to the US-based SITE Intelligence Group, which monitors Islamic extremist websites. SITE said al-Zawahiri split his lecture into three distinct parts, addressing in turn the uprisings in Libya, Egypt and Tunisia. Zawahiri stated al-Qaeda's backing for the ousted Tunisian and Egyptian presidents and also accused the Egyptian government of "separation from Islam" and "subservience to the West," the monitoring group said. The video was the fifth installment in Egyptian-born Zawahiri's series titled "A Message of Hope and Glad Tidings to Our People in Egypt". The video concluded with an excerpt of a previously released video message from U.S.-Yemeni cleric and terror suspect Anwar al-Awlaqi.

=== May 22, 2011 ===
In an audio message, al-Zawahiri backed the Arab Spring revolts and called for Sharia law in Egypt. In a three-part audio message which the jihadist network's media arm Al-Sahab said was recorded before U.S. forces killed bin Laden on May 2, al-Zawahiri addressed the populations of Libya, Syria and Egypt in turn. SITE Intelligence, which monitors jihadist Internet forums, said the Egyptian militant warned Libyans the NATO-led aerial bombing campaign against Moamer Kadhafi seeks to replace the strongman with its own tyrannical regime. He also called upon the Muslims of North Africa to join the fight against Kadhafi and to obtain weapons, while criticising Egypt's military for not coming to the aid of Egyptian expatriates residing in Libya. He also briefly addressed Syrians, calling on them to continue their uprising against President Bashar al-Assad's regime and to ignore the words of support offered by Americans, whom al-Zawahiri argues have been allied with the regime in the war on terror.

=== June 8, 2011 ===
In his first video message since the death of bin Laden, al-Zawahiri warned that bin Laden would continue to "terrify" the U.S. from beyond the grave. Notably however, he did not stake a claim to take over as head of al-Qaeda. He again backed the Arab Spring, calling for Sharia Islamic law to be applied in Egypt, but warned Libyans that NATO's bombing campaign aimed to replace Muammar Gaddafi with a Western-backed tyrannical regime. The statement was posted on Jihadist websites.

=== July 28, 2011 ===
Al-Zawahiri is claiming solidarity with Syria's pro-democracy movement, while urging protesters there to direct their anti-government uprising also against the U.S. and Israel. In a video message posted on Islamist websites, al-Zawahiri directly addressed the Syrian demonstrators who have risen up against President Bashar al-Assad's rule despite a bloody government crackdown. Al-Zawahiri accused Assad of being a corrupt tyrant and “America's partner in the war on Islam.” He claimed that Washington wants to replace Assad with “a new ruler who follows America protects Israel's interests.”

=== August 14, 2011 ===
On August 14, al-Zawahiri urged Muslims to target the United States and avenge the killing of bin Laden, the SITE Intelligence Group reported Monday. SITE, quoting a video posted on jihadist online forums, said al-Zawahiri asked Muslims to "pursue" the United States over the killing of Bin Laden. It was a 12-minute video addressed. "The Muslim movement in general and the jihadi movement in particular should wage the battle of intellectual argument just as much as the battle of weapons," he said.

=== September 13, 2011 ===
Al-Zawahiri released a video called "The Dawn of Imminent Victory," which was posted on jihadist websites. It also includes footage of Osama bin Laden, warning Americans against "falling as slaves" to corporations. SITE stated that the footage of Bin Laden appeared to be the same material found in the U.S. raid on his Abbottabad hideout in May, which Washington released without its soundtrack. It said that the 62-minute video featured al-Zawahiri applauding the Arab Spring revolutions. "Zawahiri... declared that, contrary to what is reported in the media, al-Qaeda supports the revolutions and hopes it will establish true Islam and Sharia-based governance," AFP quoted SITE as saying. "The popular revolutions, he stated, are a form of defeat for the United States, just as the 9/11 attacks and its alleged lack of success in Afghanistan and Iraq were also defeats."

=== November 15, 2011 ===
Bin Laden was described as "tender" and "kind" in a video released by al-Zawahiri. The video, called "Days with the Imam: Part One" lasts for about 30 minutes. Al-Zawahiri stated that he created the video to show bin Laden's "human side" and to tell people about his great loyalty. "People don't know that this man was tender, gentle, kind, with refined feelings, even when life was hard," al-Zawahiri claims, dressed in a white robe and turban and sitting in front of a green curtain. He recalls how bin Laden reacted when he received the news that some members of al-Zawahiri's family had been killed. With tears in his eyes, bin Laden came to see al-Zawahiri and hugged him. He adds that bin Laden was devoted to his children, paying great attention to ensuring that they were well-educated, despite constantly moving from place to place. Bin Laden, he said, didn't want those who carried out the September 11 attacks to be forgotten. "Everyone close to him saw the fine and noble education in his children," al-Zawahiri said, adding that bin Laden employed a teacher who would threaten to beat the children with a stick to teach them the Quran.

=== December 1, 2011 ===
Al-Zawahiri claimed that al-Qaeda had kidnapped 70-year-old American Warren Weinstein from Lahore in August. He demanded the release of Ramzi Yousef, Sheikh Omar Abdel Rahman, and others as well as the end of airstrikes in Pakistan, Afghanistan, Yemen, Somalia, and Gaza in exchange for the man's release. Al-Zawahiri also confirmed the death of Atiyah Abd al-Rahman, an al-Qaeda leader who was killed in a U.S. drone strike.

=== February 9, 2012 ===
Al-Shabaab and al-Qaeda announced their formal merger (according to a video disseminated online and translated by the SITE Institute). In the video, Moktar Ali Zubeyr pledges his organization's allegiance to al-Qaeda, which al-Zawahiri accepts.

=== February 12, 2012 ===
Al-Zawahiri in a video recording urged Syrians not to rely on the West or Arab governments in their uprising to topple President Bashar al-Assad. In the 8-minute video titled "Onwards, Lions of Syria" and posted on an Islamist website, al-Zawahri also urged Muslims in Turkey, Iraq, Lebanon, and Jordan to come to the aid of Syrian rebels confronting Assad's forces. Al-Zawahiri said, "A Muslim should help his brothers in Syria with all that he can, with his life, money, opinion, as well as information."

=== May 9, 2012 ===
In a seven-minute message video posted on an Islamist website, al-Zawahiri rejected the U.S. apology over the burning of Quran copies at a base in Afghanistan, urging all Muslims to support the Taliban.

=== May 11, 2012 ===
Al-Zawahiri released a video in which he encouraged Somali militants to fight on despite the challenges. He urged al-Shabaab not to be deterred by U.S. drone strikes.

=== August 2, 2013 ===
In a fourteen-minute audio message, al-Zawahiri criticizes the ouster of Egyptian President Mohamed Morsi in the coup d'état which occurred months before. He alleges that 'The crusaders, the seculars, the Americanized army, [former President Hosni] Mubarak's thugs and some members of Islamic parties with the support of Gulf money and American plotting' led the overthrow of the Morsi government and installment of Abdel Fattah el-Sisi, whom he believes to be pro-American.

=== September 3, 2014 ===
In a 55-minute video posted online, al-Zawahiri announced the formation of al-Qaeda in the Indian Subcontinent to "raise the flag of jihad" across South Asia. Al-Zawahiri claims that the formation of AQIS "would be good news for Muslims in Myanmar (Burma), Bangladesh and in the Indian states of Assam, Gujarat and Jammu and Kashmir, where they would be rescued from injustice and oppression." He also renews his pledge of allegiance to Taliban leader Mullah Omar in the video.

=== August 13, 2015 ===
In an audio recording, al-Zawahiri gave condolences for the deceased Taliban leader Mullah Omar and pledged allegiance to his successor, Akhter Mansour.

=== July 1, 2016 ===
In a video, al-Zawahri warns the United States of the "gravest consequences" if Muslim prisoners in that country are executed. He specifically names Dzhokhar Tsarnaev, who was facing a death sentence for his involvement in the 2013 Boston Marathon bombing.

=== February 5, 2019 ===
Al-Zawahiri urges in a video release for Muslims to unite against their enemies, them including Shia Muslims, Americans, Russians, French and Chinese people.

=== July 8, 2019 ===
In a video titled, 'Don't forget Kashmir', al-Zawahiri urged unification the waging of jihad against Indian security forces in Jammu and Kashmir. He also criticized Pakistan in the video and urged jihadi groups to sever ties with Pakistani intelligence agencies. At the end of the video, he eulogizes Ansar Ghazwat-ul-Hind leader Zakir Musa, who was killed months before the video was published. The message was transcribed in both English and Arabic.

=== September 11, 2019 ===
In a video titled 'And They Shall Continue to Fight You', al-Zawahiri defended the September 11 attacks on its anniversary, criticizing religious figures who opposed the attacks on the grounds that it killed civilians. He brings up the Israeli-Palestinian conflict, framing the attacks as a response to the destruction of Palestine brought by the Israelis. He also criticises U.S. president Donald Trump for the recently announced American recognition of Jerusalem as the capital of Israel.

=== April 5, 2022 ===
In a nine-minute video, al-Zawahiri praised an Indian Muslim woman who refused to take off her hijab to comply with the uniform code of a school in Karnataka and was subsequently ridiculed by a mob of Hindus. This video was the last to be released during al-Zawahiri's lifetime, as he would be killed in a U.S. drone strike in July of the same year.

=== December 23, 2022 ===
A 35-minute recording narrated by al-Zawahiri was released by al-Qaeda, seemingly in an attempt to prove his survival. The recording was undated and its contents provided no information as to what time period it could have been made.

== See also ==
Videos and audio recordings of Osama bin Laden

- Osama bin Laden
- al-Qaeda
- as-Sahab
- IntelCenter
