= Roy Hallums =

American contractor (born 1948)

Roy Hallums (born June 23, 1948) is an American contractor who was kidnapped in Iraq on November 1, 2004. He was held in Iraq for 311 days and liberated on September 7, 2005.

== Life ==
Hallums grew up in Memphis, Tennessee. In 1971 he married Susan Hallums and they had a daughter, Carrie Anne. The couple divorced in 2003, but remain good friends.

Hallums had been working in Saudi Arabia since 1993 and eventually came to work for the Saudi Arabian Trading and Construction Co. After the outbreak of the 2003 Iraq War, Hallums went to Baghdad where his company provided food for the Iraqi Army. After being released from captivity in September 2005, he settled down in Memphis.

== Captivity ==
On November 1, 2004, twenty gunmen stormed the compound where Hallums and his colleagues were working in the upscale Mansour district of Baghdad. Hallums was taken hostage along with Roberto Tarongoy of the Philippines, Inus Dewari of Nepal and three Iraqis. Dewari and the Iraqis were released soon after their abduction.

On December 18, American diplomats identified Hallums as the American kidnapped on November 1. His family had pleaded for his release weeks before, however, and Hallums had been identified on several websites. Hallums recounted that The Jawa Report was where his wife Susan first saw his name mentioned in public.

His daughter Carrie Anne Cooper soon set up a website asking for Hallums' release. His family also appealed for his release on Al Jazeera.

A videotape of Hallums was released by insurgents on January 25, 2005. It is unclear when the tape was made. Hallums had a long beard and was seated with a gun pointed at his head. "I have been arrested by a resistance group in Iraq," Hallums said. "I am asking for help because my life is in danger, because it has been proved that I work for American forces."

Hallums did not appeal to American President Bush, but did so to Libyan president Muammar Gaddafi to help secure his release. Gaddafi later called for Hallums' release.

Roberto Tarongoy was freed on June 23, 2005. Tarongoy said that he thought Hallums was still alive and said that the kidnappers demanded $12 million.

== Liberation ==
Hallums was freed on September 7, 2005, along with an Iraqi captive, when members of the U.S. Army's Delta Force raided a farmhouse 15 miles south of Baghdad. The location was apparently given by an Iraqi detainee. When coalition troops arrived, the kidnappers had fled.

Altogether, Roy Hallums had been captive ten months and seven days. He said that he had been bound and gagged for much of the time, but doctors described him as being in "good health". After his release, he called his daughter, identifying himself by saying "This is Dad."

Hallums story was featured on an episode of the TV series Locked Up Abroad.

== See also ==
- List of kidnappings
- List of solved missing person cases (2000s)

== Book ==
- Hallums, Roy. Buried Alive: The True Story of Kidnapping, Captivity, and a Dramatic Rescue. New York: Thomas Nelson, 2010. ISBN 1-59555-170-0.
