= The Jawa Report =

Blog and forum about terrorism committed by Islamists

- Creator: "Dr. Rusty Shackleford" (alias)
- Website: mypetjawa.mu.nu

The Jawa Report (also, MyPetJawa) was a blog and forum about terrorism committed by Islamists.

The Boston Globe describes it as a "popular" website "that monitors terrorism investigations." The Guardian describes the blog as right wing. The New York Times reports that its volunteers "research Web sites they believe are tied to Al-Qaeda or other militant groups, and pressure Internet service providers to stop hosting the sites."

== Background ==
The Jawa Report began in 2004, in response to the killing by Islamists of American hostage Nick Berg. Started by a blogger who goes by the alias of Dr. Rusty Shackleford, a reference to the fake name used by King of the Hill character Dale Gribble. Shackleford said: "When I saw the Nick Berg beheading, ... it drove me to start blogging about the plight of hostages held in Iraq." Shackleford was an untenured professor when he began the blog. He maintains his anonymity because of death threats he has received.

== Notable coverage ==
=== Roy Hallums ===
Contractor Roy Hallums, who was kidnapped in Iraq on November 1, 2004, held for 311 days, and freed on September 7, 2005, recounted in Buried Alive: The True Story of Kidnapping, Captivity, and a Dramatic Rescue that the Jawa Report was where his wife Susan first saw his name mentioned in public. It had been concealed by the Federal Bureau of Investigation until then. The Jawa Report had learned his identity from a Filipino government report.

=== Reuters photographs controversy ===
In 2006, Shackleford discovered and revealed the second doctored photo taken by a Reuters freelance photographer, Adnan Hajj, during the 2006 Lebanon War. Its caption falsely said: "An Israeli F-16 warplane fires missiles during an air strike on Nabatiyeh in southern Lebanon."

The truth was that the F-16 was dropping defensive flares, and the photo had been doctored to increase the number of flares falling from the F-16 from one to three. Reuters deleted all of the photographer's photos from its database. Its global pictures editor said: "Manipulating photographs in this way is entirely unacceptable and contrary to all the principles consistently held by Reuters throughout its long and distinguished history."

=== JihadJane plot ===
In the Colleen LaRose ("Jihad Jane") plot, Jawa Report members who had been tracking her comments and movements, including her raising funds for Pakistani militants through Twitter, alerted US authorities in July 2009. The FBI interviewed her on July 17, 2009, and arrested her on October 16, 2009, at Philadelphia International Airport as she returned from London, whereupon she confessed her role in an Islamist plot to kill a Swedish artist to FBI agents, according to two people close to the investigation.

=== "Death to all Juice" ===
The Jawa Report was the first to note that Carlos "Omar" Eduardo Almonte, a Muslim man from New Jersey who was arrested in June 2010 while bound for Somalia, and was charged with conspiring to kill, maim, and kidnap people outside the U.S., had posted a photo of himself demonstrating with a large placard, bearing the inscription "DEATH TO ALL JUICE" (sic), at the 2008 Israel Day Parade in New York City, on his Facebook page.

== As a source ==
Postings on Jawa Report were either quoted or reported by many mainstream news providers, including The New York Times, the New York Daily News, Fox News, The Philadelphia Inquirer, The Boston Globe, The Washington Times, The Times, The Guardian, The Sunday Telegraph, Toronto Star, Salon, The Weekly Standard, The New York Sun, The Free Lance–Star, the Lodi News-Sentinel, the Columbia Journalism Review, Australian Broadcasting Company, and CBS.

== See also ==
- Internet Haganah
- Jihad Watch
