= Rita Katz =

Iraqi-born anti-terrorism activist (born 1963)

- ריטה כץ
- Born: 1963 (age 62–63); Basra, Iraq
- Education: Tel Aviv University
- Occupation: Terrorism analyst
- Years active: 1997–present
- Employer: SITE Institute
- Notable work: Terrorist Hunter: The Extraordinary Story of a Woman Who Went Undercover to Infiltrate the Radical Islamic Groups Operating in America Saints and Soldiers: Inside Internet-Age Terrorism, From Syria to the Capitol Siege
- Title: Executive Director
- Website: siteintelgroup.com

Rita Katz (Hebrew: ריטה כץ; born 1963) is a terrorism analyst and the co-founder of the Search International Terrorist Entities (SITE) Intelligence Group, a private intelligence firm based in Washington, D.C.

The Institute tracks global terrorist networks, and intercepts and distributes messages, videos, and advance warnings of suicide bombings from terrorist groups' communications networks.

== Early life ==
Katz was born in Basra in southern Iraq in 1963 to a wealthy Iraqi Jewish family. After the Six-Day War and shortly after Saddam Hussein's Ba'ath Party seized power in Iraq in 1968, her father was arrested on charges of spying for Israel. The family's property was confiscated by the state, and the rest of the family put under house arrest in a stone hut. The following year, after having been tortured, Katz's father was convicted and executed in a public hanging in the central square of Baghdad, witnessed by more than half a million Iraqis.

Katz's mother managed to escape with her three children to Iran, from where they made their way to Israel. The family settled in the seaside town of Bat Yam. While in Israel, Katz served in the Israel Defense Forces and studied politics, history, and Middle Eastern studies at Tel Aviv University.

In 1997, Katz' husband was offered a research fellowship in endocrinology at the National Institutes of Health and they moved to Washington with their three children. Katz acknowledged that at the time she worked in violation of the provisions of her visa.

== Career ==
In 1998, Katz began working for a research institute called the Investigative Project, run by journalist Steven Emerson. She worked there on counterterrorism investigations. During her first research project, she suspected that the Holy Land Foundation, a charity organization dedicated to supporting humanitarian programs primarily in the West Bank and Gaza, was a front group for Hamas. Wanting to examine it more closely, she attended a fundraiser of theirs dressed as a Muslim woman.

Soon thereafter, again disguised as a Muslim woman, wearing a burqa and wearing recording equipment, Katz began attending Islamic conferences and fundraisers, visiting mosques, and participating in pro-Palestinian rallies in the U.S. as an undercover investigator in order to expose links of American Islamic groups to foreign terrorist groups.

Katz's SITE Institute, co-founded with Josh Devon in July 2002, was funded by various federal agencies and private groups. It analyzes "corporate records, tax forms, credit reports, video tapes, internet news group postings and owned websites, among other resources, for indicators of illicit activity". It provided information on radical Muslim groups operating in the United States, and led to closures of organizations, deportations, and ongoing investigations.

With the SITE Institute, which she co-founded to monitor Islamic extremist websites and to expose terrorist front groups, Katz worked with federal investigators in terrorism cases. She was cited in Richard Clarke's book, Against All Enemies, as having helped to provide information to the government on the Al Qaeda network. Clarke wrote that she and Steven Emerson, for whom she formerly worked, regularly provided the White House with a stream of information about possible Al Qaeda activity inside the U.S. that was apparently largely unknown to the FBI before the 9/11 attacks. They gave Clarke and his staff the names of Islamic radical Web sites, the identities of possible terrorist front groups, and the phone numbers and addresses of possible terror suspects—data Clarke was unable to get from elsewhere in the government.

In May 2003, Katz published an anonymous semi-autobiography entitled Terrorist Hunter: The Extraordinary Story of a Woman Who Went Undercover to Infiltrate the Radical Islamic Groups Operating in America (Harper Collins, 2003; ISBN 9780060528195). She appeared in disguise on the CBS newsmagazine, 60 Minutes, to promote her book using the pseudonym "Sarah", and wearing a wig and a fake nose, to protect herself and her family from retaliation from groups that she said were linked to al-Qaeda, Hamas, Islamic Jihad, and Hezbollah. In the book she tries to reveal what she sees as the gravity and extent of the presence of Islamic fundamentalism in America, and that government agencies still do not work together as one to fight terrorism, instead concealing information from each other, attempting to take over investigations, and even deliberately slowing down terrorism investigations. Katz in Terrorist Hunter was from the time period that she was employed by Steven Emerson at the Investigative Project on Terrorism.

SITE's work was cited in The New York Times and the Washington Post about twice a month as of 2006. In January 2007, Al Jazeera reported that the National Association of Muslim American Women filed a formal complaint with the U.S. Department of Justice Civil Rights Division, Criminal Section, and with the Executive Office for the United States Attorneys at the U.S. Department of Justice, alleging that, as a result of misleading and false information provided to U.S. law enforcement agencies, the media, and various governmental bodies, various Jewish organizations and individuals including Katz had sought to create an environment in the U.S. that is hostile towards U.S. Muslims, resulting in the deprivation and violation of Muslim civil liberties and civil rights.

In October 2007, it was revealed that Katz had discovered and issued to the Bush administration a copy of an Osama bin Laden video which had yet to be released by al-Qaeda. Katz issued the video via a private link to a SITE web page to White House counsel Fred F. Fielding and Joel Bagnal, deputy assistant to the President for Homeland Security. Within 20 minutes, computers registered to various parts of the Executive Branch began downloading the video, and within hours a transcript referencing SITE had appeared on Fox News. Katz had requested that the web page remain confidential. She said the premature disclosure tipped al-Qaeda to a security breach and destroyed a surveillance operation to intercept and pass along secret messages, videos and advance warnings of suicide bombings from the terrorist group's communications network. The U.S. government didn't refute her claims.

=== Controversies ===
In July 2003, two of the groups she discussed in her book and on television (the Heritage Education Trust and the Safa Trust) sued her and revealed her name and identity. In two of the suits, targets of the investigation said they were defamed in the 60 Minutes television broadcast. Katz said she has been the victim of a smear campaign and of attempts to intimidate her, adding:

"As they were never able to challenge the accuracy of my research, and as they were upset by the ramifications of it in terms of arrests, indictments, and raids, a few Muslim activist organizations have on occasion tried to portray me as a Muslim-basher. I have no quarrel with Islam or Muslims, and I only target terrorists and their supporters."

In one case, in 2005, federal Judge Leonie Brinkema dismissed Katz from the lawsuit by a leader of the International Institute of Islamic Thought, Iqbal Unus. Katz's dismissal was upheld on appeal unanimously by a three-judge panel of the 4th U.S. Circuit Court of Appeals in 2009. The court also ordered Unus to pay Katz $41,000 in legal fees.

In 2015, Katz described an apparent Australian online supporter of IS who used the online handle "Australi Witness" as holding a "prestige" position in online jihadi circles and as being "part of the hard core of a group of individuals who constantly look for targets for other people to attack". It later transpired that "Australi Witness" was an American (Joshua Ryne Goldberg), who was arrested by the FBI.

== Works ==
=== Books ===
- Terrorist Hunter: The Extraordinary Story of a Woman Who Went Undercover to Infiltrate the Radical Islamic Groups Operating in America, (as Anonymous). (Harper Collins, May 6, 2003; ISBN 0-06-052819-2)
- Saints and Soldiers: Inside Internet-Age Terrorism, From Syria to the Capitol Siege (Columbia University Press, 2022); ISBN 0-23-120350-0)

=== Testimony ===
- "The Online Jihadist Threat", Testimony Before the House Armed Services Committee; Terrorism, and Unconventional Threats and Capabilities Subcommittee, U.S. House of Representatives, with Josh Devon, February 14, 2007
- "The Online Jihadist Threat", Testimony Before The Homeland Security Committee; Subcommittee on Intelligence, Information Sharing and Terrorism Risk Assessment, U.S. House of Representatives, with Josh Devon, November 6, 2007

== Popular culture ==
Katz is the subject of director Ann Shin's documentary, The Terrorist Hunter.

== See also ==
- Jarret Brachman
- Steven Emerson
- Evan Kohlmann
