= Academic grading in Egypt =

In Egypt, the academic grading system functions with a worded grade and increases in increments from 10 to 30 points.

The title jayyid jiddan or very good, denotes the second highest mark possible, on par with a "B" student.

Percent	Qualification
85–100	Excellent (Momtaz) (Arabic: ممتاز)
75–84	Very good or Distinct (jayed jedan) (Arabic: جيد جدًا)
65–74	Good (jayed) or credit (Arabic: جيد)
50–64	Acceptable (Maqboul) or pass (Arabic: مقبول)
30–49	Weak (Daeef) (Arabic: ضعيف)
0–29	Very weak (Daeef jedan) (Arabic: ضعيف جدًا)
