= Killing of Ayman al-Zawahiri =

2022 U.S. drone strike on the leader of al-Qaeda

- Part of the war on terror and the Afghan conflict
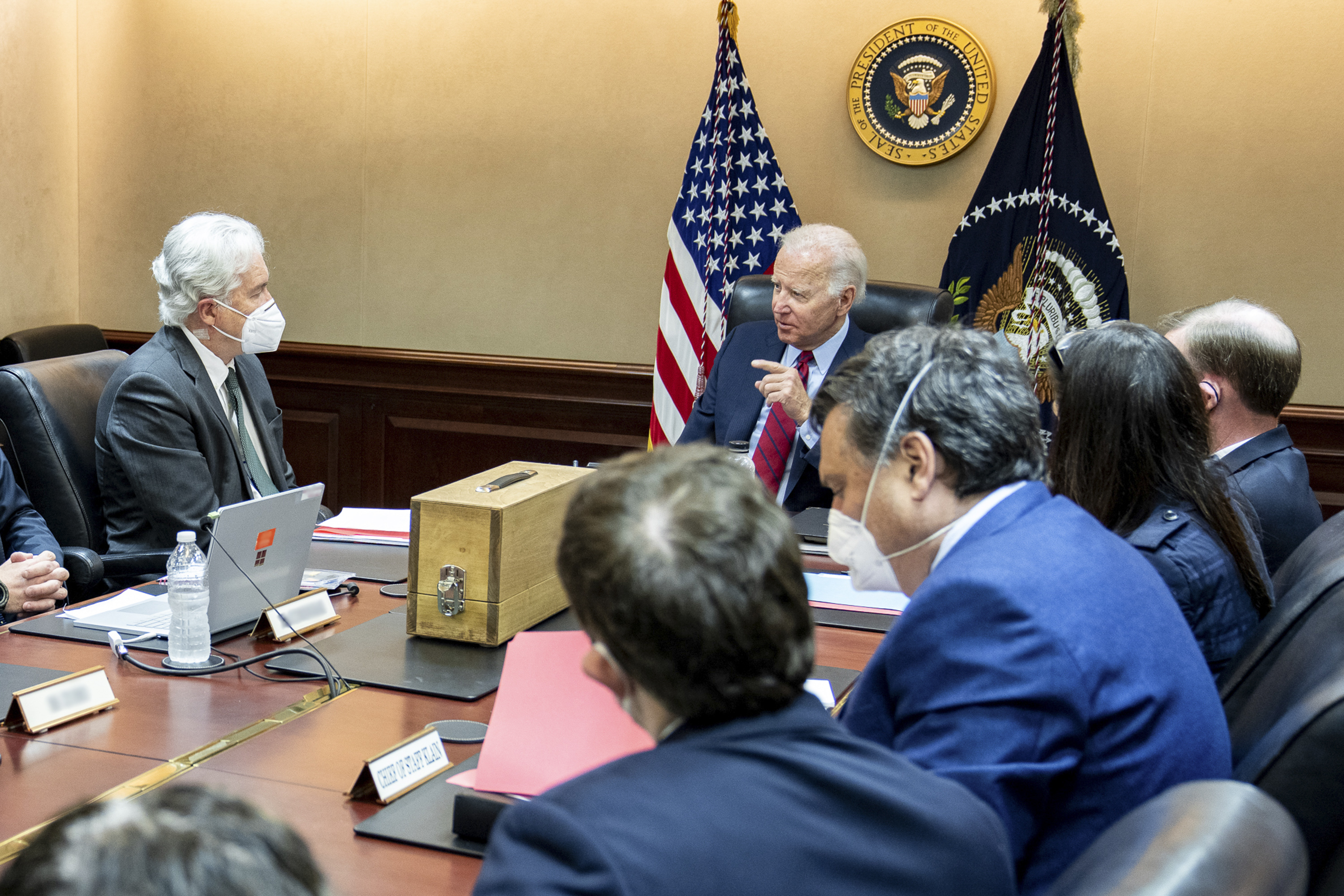
- U.S. president Joe Biden meets with his national security team on July 1 to discuss the drone strike on Ayman al-Zawahiri. The wooden box in front of Biden contains a replica of the house where al-Zawahiri was living in Kabul, Afghanistan.
- Date: 31 July 2022; 4 years ago
- Time: c. 6:18 am (UTC+04:30)
- Location: Sherpur, Kabul, Afghanistan; 34°32′03″N 69°10′33″E
- Type: Drone strike
- Executed by: Central Intelligence Agency's Special Activities Center

On 31 July 2022, Ayman al-Zawahiri, the leader of the Salafi jihadist group al-Qaeda, was killed by a United States drone strike in Kabul, Afghanistan.

Al-Zawahiri was one of the planners of the September 11 attacks against the United States. He succeeded Osama bin Laden as leader of al-Qaeda after bin Laden was killed by U.S. forces in Pakistan on 2 May 2011.

He was located and tracked by the Central Intelligence Agency (CIA) months before his death. After receiving authorization from U.S. president Joe Biden to initiate the strike, the CIA fired two Hellfire missiles at the balcony of al-Zawahiri's house, killing him.

The strike came nearly a year after the conclusion of the war in Afghanistan. al-Zawahiri's presence in Afghanistan was a violation of the agreement for the withdrawal of American forces from the country, under which the Taliban would not allow al-Qaeda members any sanctuary. Following the strike, members of the Haqqani network attempted to cover up al-Zawahiri's death, although the U.S. was able to confirm it. In response to the strike, Biden released a statement announcing al-Zawahiri's death, calling it a "deliverance of justice".

== Background ==
Ayman al-Zawahiri was a member of the extremist militant organization al-Qaeda and the deputy to its leader Osama bin Laden. He was one of the planners of the September 11 attacks. Subsequently, American president George W. Bush released a list of the Federal Bureau of Investigation's Most Wanted Terrorists, designating al-Zawahiri as the second most wanted behind bin Laden. While bin Laden led al-Qaeda, many observers saw al-Zawahiri as being responsible for its operations. However, he consistently eluded manhunts and assassination attempts for decades, spanning the presidencies of Bush, Barack Obama and Donald Trump's first term.

In late 2001, bin Laden and al-Zawahiri eluded the grasp of American forces during their invasion of Afghanistan, which al-Qaeda used as a base under the rule of the Taliban. Bin Laden was killed in an American raid in Abbottabad, Pakistan, in 2011, with al-Zawahiri taking over a weakened al-Qaeda. In 2016, it was reported that he had gone to extreme lengths to evade American forces, using a green screen to mask his surroundings while delivering video messages. American officials believed he was hiding in the area along the Durand Line, the border between Afghanistan and Pakistan.

In 2020, after nearly 20 years of war, the U.S. government negotiated a withdrawal agreement with the Taliban under which the Taliban agreed not to provide a safe haven for individuals involved with al-Qaeda and other terrorist organizations. As American forces started withdrawing in 2021, the Taliban launched a major insurgent offensive and quickly recaptured Afghanistan.

While evacuating, the U.S. was criticized for a drone strike in Kabul that caused the deaths of ten civilians. While the U.S. initially denied the error, it acknowledged it after an exposé by The New York Times. Administration sources told the Times that since then they "have been taking more precautions to prevent civilian casualties in the strikes."

== Preparation ==
Six to seven months before the assassination, the U.S. Intelligence Community tracked the movements of al-Zawahiri's family. They learned that al-Zawahiri's family relocated to a safe house in Kabul after its recapture by the Taliban. Subsequently, al-Zawahiri himself joined them after relocating from Pakistan. The building was reportedly owned by a top aide to Taliban official Sirajuddin Haqqani, and located in Sherpur, a neighborhood in downtown Kabul.

In early April 2022, Jonathan Finer, the deputy national security advisor to Biden, and Elizabeth Sherwood-Randall, the Homeland Security Advisor, were the first to be briefed on al-Zawahiri's location. Biden was then briefed by national security advisor Jake Sullivan. During May and June, American officials verified the information and prepared various options to carry out the assassination.

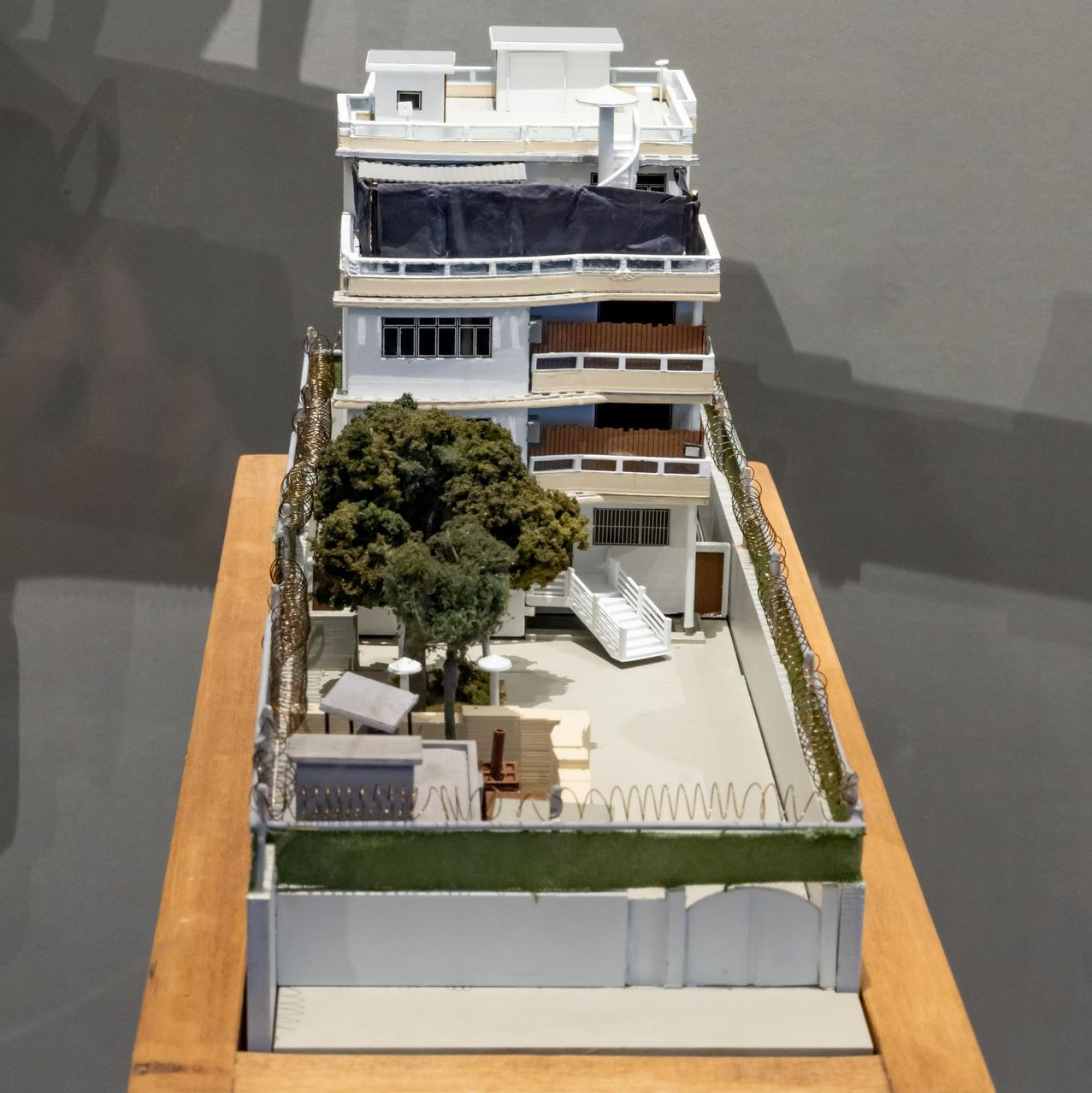
The scale model of al-Zawahiri's house shown to Biden and used by officials in preparation for the strike

The intelligence community tracked al-Zawahiri's movements and daily habits for months. He never left the safe house after arriving. After learning that al-Zawahiri liked to sit on the house's balcony, the National Geospatial-Intelligence Agency's model shop constructed a scale model of the building to prepare for the strike and avoid harm to the other occupants. On 1 July, Biden was briefed on the plan and viewed the model himself. At the meeting, Biden questioned the director of the Central Intelligence Agency William J. Burns, the director of national intelligence Avril Haines, and the director of the National Counterterrorism Center Christine Abizaid on the details, risks, and legality of the strike. In particular, Biden worried about how the strike could affect the status of American Mark Frerichs, a captive of the Taliban since January 2020. On 25 July, Biden received a final briefing, where all of the officials involved gave their unanimous approval of the decision to strike.

== Operation ==
On 31 July 2022, at 6:18 a.m. local time, a U.S.-operated drone fired two AGM-114 Hellfire missiles at al-Zawahiri while he was standing outside on the balcony of his house. Al-Zawahiri was killed, but the other occupants of the house were unharmed. The Hellfire variant is widely considered to have been the R9X, often called the "Ninja bomb" and the "Flying Ginsu" due to its usage of pop-out blades in the warhead instead of explosives. A kinetic energy-based, non-explosive weapon, the R9X was designed to be used against specific human targets with minimal collateral damage.

US officials did not say from which country or location the drone was launched; according to NPR, it was likely launched from a great distance away, as the US no longer maintained active military bases in the region.

== Aftermath ==
News of the event broke two days after the strike was conducted, after intelligence confirmed that al-Zawahiri was dead. A senior Biden administration official confirmed to reporters that a drone strike had taken place in Afghanistan and that it had eliminated an al-Qaeda target. Biden himself confirmed that he had authorized the strike a week prior.

According to a senior American official, the family of al-Zawahiri was moved to another location by members of the Haqqani network, which is a part of the Taliban government.

Anti-American protests broke out in Afghanistan on 5 August, with hundreds of Afghans condemning the U.S. for the strike.

On 8 October, the deputy director of the CIA David Cohen and Special Representative for Afghanistan Tom West met a Taliban delegation headed by Abdul Haq Wasiq, the Taliban head of intelligence in Doha. This was the first meeting between US and Taliban officials since the death of al-Zawahiri.

=== Al-Qaeda response ===
As of February 2023, al-Qaeda has yet to either confirm the killing of al-Zawahiri or publicly name his successor. On 23 December 2022, they released "a new recording by Zawahiri", though it did not contain indications of when it was made, and his image continues to be used across their publications.

Al-Qaeda's muted response is widely considered by analysts to be a sign that the group is further decentralizing. The group was highly centralized with a clear hierarchy when it was first created. Its international expansion, the war on terror, and bin Laden's assassination accelerated decentralization. Even before al-Zawahiri's death, an example of this decentralization could be seen in the decision of the regional affiliate al-Qaeda in the Indian Subcontinent (AQIS) to support the Tehrik-e-Taliban Pakistan (TTP) in its opposition towards the Pakistani state, which ran counter to the then goals of the Taliban and al-Qaeda. Its regional affiliates, particularly those in Africa, such as Jama'at Nusrat al-Islam al-Muslimin (JNIM) in West Africa, al-Shabaab in Somalia, and al-Qaeda in the Islamic Maghreb (AQIM) still pose significant threats as of 2023.

In February 2023, the United Nations reported that many member countries believed Saif al-Adel to be the de facto successor of al-Zawahiri, but al-Qaeda had not formally named him, likely to avoid acknowledging the Taliban giving shelter to al-Zawahiri, as well as al-Adel living in Shia-majority Iran, which Sunni al-Qaeda has long viewed as apostate.

== International reactions ==
=== U.S. politicians ===
US President Biden delivers remarks confirming that US military executed a targeted killing of al-Zawahiri.

In a televised address, President Biden stated that "justice [had] been delivered", citing al-Zawahiri's involvement in the September 11 attacks as a justification for the strike. He also affirmed that American forces would find and eliminate anyone who was a threat to the U.S.

The Secretary of State Antony Blinken accused the Taliban of "grossly violating" the withdrawal agreement by giving refuge to al-Zawahiri. National Security Council spokesperson John Kirby warned the Taliban to abide by the agreement if it wanted international recognition and financing.

The State Department issued a "Worldwide Caution Alert" on 2 August, warning of a higher potential of al-Qaeda sympathizers attacking Americans after the strike and urging American citizens traveling to other countries to remain cautious.

Members of the Democratic Party actively praised Biden's actions, including House Speaker Nancy Pelosi, Senate Majority Leader Chuck Schumer, and various members of Congress.

Senators belonging to the Republican Party praised Biden's actions, including Marco Rubio and Joni Ernst. Senate Minority Leader Mitch McConnell urged Biden's administration to adopt a comprehensive security plan in Afghanistan.

Former president Barack Obama applauded the killing on Twitter, proclaiming that "tonight’s news is also proof that it’s possible to root out terrorism without being at war in Afghanistan. And I hope it provides a small measure of peace to the 9/11 families and everyone else who has suffered at the hands of al-Qaeda."

=== Taliban ===
The Taliban did not confirm al-Zawahiri's death, and condemned the operation as a strike on an empty residential house. The organization was reported to be in a political dilemma, balancing its need for international recognition and internal calls to retaliate against the U.S.

Suhail Shaheen, the head of the Taliban's political office in Doha, said that they were not aware of the presence of al-Zawahiri in Kabul and an investigation was underway to verify the allegations. Zabiullah Mujahid, the chief spokesperson of the Taliban, assured that Afghanistan would not become a refuge for terrorism against any country and insisted that the organization would honor the withdrawal agreement, while warning the U.S. to stop violating it. He later claimed that they did not find a body at the site.

A spokesman for the Taliban said: "Such actions are a repetition of the failed experiences of the past 20 years and are against the interests of the United States of America, Afghanistan and the region".

=== International governments ===
Allies of the United States inside and outside NATO praised the killing of al-Zawahiri.

The Prime Minister of Australia Anthony Albanese said he hoped terrorist attack victims find some "small solace" in the death of al-Zawahiri.

The Prime Minister of Canada Justin Trudeau tweeted "The death of Ayman al-Zawahiri is a step toward a safer world. Canada will keep working with our global partners to counter terrorist threats, promote peace and security and keep people here at home and around the world safe."

Saudi Arabia's foreign ministry said "al-Zawahiri is considered one of the leaders of terrorism that led the planning and execution of heinous terrorist operations in the United States and Saudi Arabia."

China's Ministry of Foreign Affairs stated that it was against all forms of terrorism, but that "counter-terrorism cooperation should not be conducted at the expense of the sovereignty of other countries."

=== Individuals ===
Greg Barton, chair of Global Islamic Politics at the Alfred Deakin Institute for Citizenship and Globalisation at Deakin University, said on Sky News Australia that al-Zawahiri might be replaced by a "more effective and more able leader".

The strike was criticized by conservative columnist Marc Thiessen for being conducted remotely, in comparison to the action by US Navy SEALs that killed Osama bin Laden in Pakistan. Thiessen wrote that the drone strike left no opportunity to gain actionable information, as the earlier operation in Pakistan had, and compared Biden's justification of the action with Blinken's comments in August 2021 about the fall of Afghanistan to the Taliban, in which he called the remaining Al-Qaeda operatives "remnants".

German professor for International law Christoph Safferling on the Tagesschau considered the killing to be in violation of international law, because he does not consider Al Qaeda to be an "armed organization". Legal expert Robert Chesney has argued that the strike was legal under domestic U.S. and international law, as the law of armed conflict would apply to Zawahiri due to Al Qaeda's continued involvement in planning violent attacks against the United States.

== See also ==
- Death of Abu Bakr al-Baghdadi – 2019 U.S. military operation in Syria
- Abu Ibrahim al-Hashimi al-Qurashi – former leader of Islamic State, killed in a U.S. raid in 2022
