= Ayman al-Zawahiri =

Emir of al-Qaeda from 2011 to 2022

- أيمن الظواهري
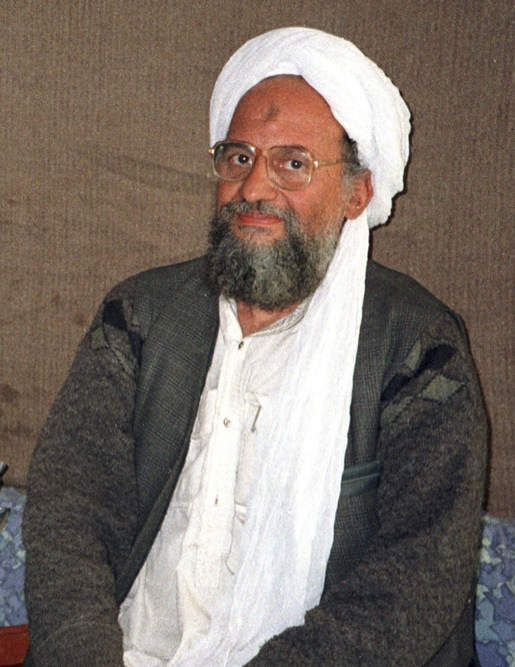
- Al-Zawahiri in 2001

2nd General Emir of al-Qaeda
- In office 16 June 2011 – 31 July 2022
- Preceded by: Osama bin Laden
- Succeeded by: Saif al-Adel (de facto)

Emir of the Egyptian Islamic Jihad
- In office 1991–1998
- Preceded by: Muhammad Abd al-Salam Faraj
- Succeeded by: Position disestablished (merged with Al-Qaeda)

Personal details
- Born: 19 June 1951 Cairo, Egypt
- Died: 31 July 2022 (aged 71) Kabul, Afghanistan
- Cause of death: Killed in action by drone strike
- Spouses: Azza Ahmad (m. 1978; died 2001): Umayma Hasan
- Children: 7
- Education: Cairo University
- Occupation: Surgeon
- Military career
- Allegiance: Egyptian Army (1974–1977); Egyptian Islamic Jihad (1980–1998); Al-Qaeda (1988–2022)
- Service years: 1974–2022
- Rank: General Emir of Al-Qaeda
- Conflicts: Soviet–Afghan War; War in Afghanistan; War on terror X

Ayman Mohammed Rabie al-Zawahiri (Arabic: أيمن محمد ربيع الظواهري, romanized: ʾAyman Muḥammad Rabīʿ aẓ-Ẓawāhirī; (Note: Al-Zawahiri is also sometimes transliterated al-Dhawahiri to reflect normative classical Arabic pronunciation beginning with /ðˤ/. The Egyptian Arabic pronunciation is [ˈʔæjmæn mæˈħæmmæd ɾɑˈbiːʕ ez.zˤɑˈwɑhɾi]; approximately: Ayman Mahammad Rabi Ezzawahri.) 19 June 1951 – 31 July 2022) was an Egyptian-born pan-Islamist militant and physician who served as the second general emir of al-Qaeda from June 2011 until his death in July 2022. He is best known for being one of the main orchestrators of the September 11 attacks.

Al-Zawahiri graduated from Cairo University with a degree in medicine and a master's degree in surgery and was a surgeon by profession. He became a leading figure in the Egyptian Islamic Jihad, an Egyptian Islamist organization, and eventually attained the rank of emir. He was imprisoned from 1981 to 1984 for his role in the assassination of Egyptian president Anwar Sadat. His actions against the Egyptian government, including his planning of the 1995 attack on the Egyptian Embassy in Pakistan, resulted in him being sentenced to death in absentia during the 1999 "Returnees from Albania" trial.

A close associate of al-Qaeda leader Osama bin Laden, al-Zawahiri held significant sway over the group's operations. He was wanted by the United States and the United Nations, respectively, for his role in the 1998 U.S. embassy bombings in Kenya and Tanzania and in the 2002 Bali bombings. He merged the Egyptian Islamic Jihad with al-Qaeda in 2001 and formally became bin Laden's deputy in 2004. He succeeded bin Laden as al-Qaeda's leader after bin Laden's death in 2011. In May 2011, the U.S. announced a $25 million bounty for information leading to his capture.

On July 31, 2022, al-Zawahiri was killed in a CIA drone strike in Afghanistan.

== Personal life ==
=== Early life ===
Ayman al-Zawahiri was born on 19 June 1951 in Cairo, Egypt to Mohammed Rabie al-Zawahiri and Umayma Azzam. The New York Times in 2001 described al-Zawahiri as coming from "a prosperous and prestigious family that gives him a pedigree grounded firmly in both religion and politics". Al-Zawahiri's parents both came from prosperous families.

Al-Zawahiri's father, Mohammed Rabie al-Zawahiri, belonged to a prominent family of doctors and scholars originating from Kafr El-Sheikh al-Zawahiri, a village in Sharqia Governorate, whose members had settled in Cairo in the 19th century. He later became a surgeon and professor of pharmacy at Ain Shams University. Sheikh Mohammed al-Ahmadi al-Zawahiri (1887–1944), who belonged to the same family, served as the 34th Grand Imam of al-Azhar.

Ayman Al-Zawahiri's mother, Umayma Azzam, came from a wealthy, politically active clan, the daughter of Abdel-Wahhab Azzam, a literary scholar who served as the president of Cairo University, the founder and inaugural rector of the King Saud University (the first university in Saudi Arabia) as well as ambassador to Pakistan, while his own brother was Azzam Pasha, the founding secretary-general of the Arab League (1945–1952). From his maternal side yet another relative was Salem Azzam, an Islamist intellectual and activist, for a time secretary-general of the Islamic Council of Europe based in London.

Ayman Al-Zawahiri said that he has a deep affection for his mother. Her brother, Mahfouz Azzam, became a role model for him as a teenager. He has a younger brother, Muhammad al-Zawahiri, a younger sister, Heba Mohamed al-Zawahiri, and a twin sister, Umnya al-Zawahiri. Heba became a professor of medical oncology at the National Cancer Institute, Cairo University. She described her brother as "silent and shy". Muhammad was sentenced on charges of undergoing military training in Albania in 1998. He was arrested in the UAE in 1999, and sentenced to death in 1999 after being extradited to Egypt. He was held in Tora Prison in Cairo as a political detainee. Security officials said he was the head of the Special Action Committee of Islamic Jihad, which organized terrorist operations. After the Egyptian popular uprising in the spring of 2011, on March 17, 2011, he was released from prison by the Supreme Council of the Armed Forces, the interim government of Egypt. His lawyer said he had been held to extract information about his brother Ayman al-Zawahiri. On March 20, 2011, he was re-arrested. On August 17, 2013, Egyptian authorities arrested Muhammad al-Zawahiri at his home in Giza. He was acquitted in 2017.

==== Youth ====
Ayman al-Zawahiri was reportedly a studious youth. He excelled in school, loved poetry, and "hated violent sports", which he thought were "inhumane." Al-Zawahiri studied medicine at Cairo University and graduated in 1974 with gayyid giddan, or roughly on par with a grade of "B" in the American grading system. Following that, he served 1974–1978 as a surgeon in the Egyptian Army after which he established a clinic near his parents in Maadi. In 1978, he also earned a master's degree in surgery. He spoke Arabic, English, and French.

Al-Zawahiri participated in youth activism as a student. He became both quite pious and political, under the influence of his uncle Mahfouz Azzam, and lecturer Mostafa Kamel Wasfi. Sayyid Qutb preached that to restore Islam and free Muslims, a vanguard of true Muslims modeling itself after the original Companions of the Prophet had to be developed. Ayman al-Zawahiri was influenced by Qutb's Manichaean views on Islamic theology and Islamic history.

==== Underground cell ====
By the age of 15, al-Zawahiri had formed an underground cell with the goal to overthrow the government and establish an Islamist state. The following year the Egyptian government executed Sayyid Qutb for conspiracy. Following the execution, al-Zawahiri, along with four other secondary school students, helped form an "underground cell devoted to overthrowing the government and establishing an Islamist state." It was at this early age that al-Zawahiri developed a mission in life, "to put Qutb's vision into action." His cell eventually merged with others to form al-Jihad or Egyptian Islamic Jihad.

=== Marriages and children ===
Ayman al-Zawahiri was married at least four times. His wives include Azza Ahmed Nowari and Umaima Hassan.

In 1978, al-Zawahiri married his first wife, Azza Ahmed Nowari, a student at Cairo University who was studying philosophy. Their wedding, which was held at the Continental Hotel in Opera Square, was very conservative, with separate areas for both men and women, and no music, photographs, or gaiety in general. Many years later, when the United States attacked Afghanistan following the September 11 attacks in October 2001, Azza apparently had no idea that al-Zawahiri had supposedly been a jihadi emir (commander) for the last decade.

Al-Zawahiri and his wife, Azza, had four daughters, Fatima (born 1981), Umayma (born 1983), Nabila (born 1986), and Khadiga (born 1987), and a son, Mohammed (also born in 1987; the twin brother of Khadiga), who was a "delicate, well-mannered boy" and "the pet of his older sisters," subject to teasing and bullying in a traditionally all-male environment, who preferred to "stay at home and help his mother." In 1997, ten years after the birth of Mohammed, Azza gave birth to their fifth daughter, Aisha, who had Down syndrome. In February 2004, Abu Zubaydah was waterboarded and subsequently stated that Abu Turab Al-Urduni had married one of al-Zawahiri's daughters.

Ayman al-Zawahiri's first wife Azza and two of their six children, Mohammad and Aisha, were killed in an airstrike on Afghanistan by US forces in late December 2001, following the September 11 attacks on the U.S. After an American aerial bombardment of a Taliban-controlled building at Gardez, Azza was pinned under the debris of a guesthouse roof. Concerned for her modesty, she "refused to be excavated" because "men would see her face" and she died from her injuries the following day. Her son, Mohammad, was also killed outright in the same house. Her four-year-old daughter with Down syndrome, Aisha, had not been hurt by the bombing, but died from exposure in the cold night while Afghan rescuers tried to save Azza.

In the first half of 2005, one of Al-Zawahiri's three surviving wives gave birth to a daughter, named Nawwar.

In June 2012, one of al-Zawahiri's four wives, Umaima Hassan, released a statement on the internet congratulating the role played by Muslim women in the Arab Spring. She is also known to have written a leaflet explaining women's role in jihad.

== Medical career ==
In 1981, Ayman al-Zawahiri traveled to Peshawar, Pakistan, where he worked in a Red Crescent hospital treating wounded refugees. There, he became friends with Ahmed Khadr, and the two shared a number of conversations about the need for Islamic government and the needs of the Afghan people.

Ayman al-Zawahiri worked as a surgeon. In 1985, al-Zawahiri went to Saudi Arabia on Hajj and stayed to practice medicine in Jeddah for a year. As a reportedly qualified surgeon, when his organization merged with bin Laden's al-Qaeda, he became bin Laden's personal advisor and physician. He had first met bin Laden in Jeddah in 1986. According to other sources, they met the first time in 1986 at a hospital in Peshawar.

In 1993, al-Zawahiri traveled to the United States, where he addressed several mosques in California under his Abdul Mu'iz pseudonym, relying on his credentials from the Kuwaiti Red Crescent to raise money for Afghan children who had been injured by Soviet land mines—he raised only $2000.

== Militant activity ==
=== Assassination plots ===
==== Egypt ====
In 1981, Al-Zawahiri was one of hundreds arrested following the assassination of President Anwar Sadat. Initially, the plan was derailed when authorities were alerted to Al-Jihad's plan by the arrest of an operative carrying crucial information, in February 1981. President Sadat ordered the roundup of more than 1,500 people, including many Al-Jihad members, but missed a cell in the military led by Lieutenant Khalid Islambouli, who succeeded in assassinating Sadat during a military parade that October. His lawyer, Montasser el-Zayat, said that al-Zawahiri was tortured in prison.

In his book, Al-Zawahiri as I Knew Him, Al-Zayat maintains that under torture by the Egyptian police, following his arrest in connection with the murder of Sadat in 1981, Al-Zawahiri revealed the hiding place of Essam al-Qamari, a key member of the Maadi cell of al-Jihad, which led to Al-Qamari's "arrest and eventual execution." He was released from prison in 1984.

In 1993, al-Zawahiri's and Egyptian Islamic Jihad's (EIJ) connection with Iran may have led to a suicide bombing in an attempt on the life of Egyptian Interior Minister Hasan al-Alfi, the man heading the effort to quash the campaign of Islamist killings in Egypt. It failed, as did an attempt to assassinate Egyptian prime minister Atef Sidqi three months later. The bombing of Sidqi's car injured 21 Egyptians and killed a schoolgirl, Shayma Abdel-Halim. It followed two years of killings by another Islamist group, al-Gama'a al-Islamiyya, that had killed over 200 people. Her funeral became a public spectacle, with her coffin carried through the streets of Cairo and crowds shouting, "Terrorism is the enemy of God!" The police arrested 280 more of al-Jihad's members and executed six.

For their leading role in anti-Egyptian Government attacks in the 1990s, al-Zawahiri and his brother Muhammad al-Zawahiri were sentenced to death in the 1999 Egyptian case of the Returnees from Albania.

==== Pakistan ====
The 1995 attack on the Egyptian embassy in Islamabad, Pakistan, was carried out by the Egyptian Islamic Jihad under al-Zawahiri's leadership, but Bin Laden had disapproved of the operation. The bombing alienated Pakistan, which was "the best route into Afghanistan".

In July 2007, Al-Zawahiri supplied direction for the Lal Masjid siege, codename Operation Silence. This was the first confirmed time that Al-Zawahiri was taking militant steps against the Pakistani Government and guiding Islamic militants against the State of Pakistan. The Pakistan Army troops and Special Service Group taking control of the Lal Masjid ("Red Mosque") in Islamabad found letters from al-Zawahiri directing Islamic militants Abdul Rashid Ghazi and Abdul Aziz Ghazi, who ran the mosque and adjacent madrasah. This conflict resulted in 100 deaths.

On December 27, 2007, al-Zawahiri was also implicated in the assassination of former Pakistani Prime Minister Benazir Bhutto.

==== Sudan ====
In 1994, the sons of Ahmad Salama Mabruk and Mohammed Sharaf were executed under al-Zawahiri's leadership for betraying Egyptian Islamic Jihad; the militants were ordered to leave the Sudan.

==== United States ====
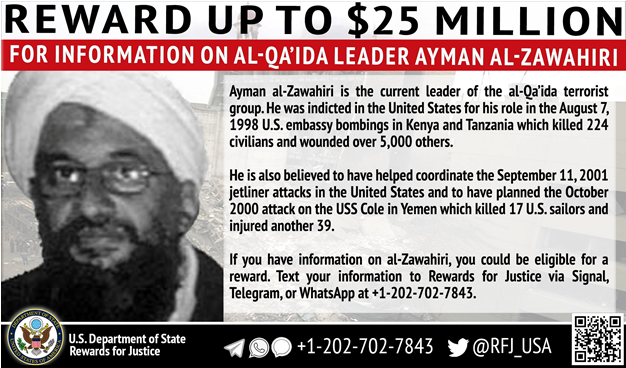
Rewards for Justice Program's bounty flyer offering US$25,000,000 for information about al-Zawahiri

In 1998, Ayman al-Zawahiri was listed as under indictment in the United States for his role in the 1998 U.S. embassy bombings: a series of attacks on August 7, 1998, in which hundreds of people were killed in simultaneous truck bomb explosions at the United States embassies in the major East African cities of Dar es Salaam, Tanzania, and Nairobi, Kenya.

In 2000, the USS Cole bombing encouraged several members to depart. Mohammed Atef escaped to Kandahar, al-Zawahiri to Kabul, and Bin Laden also fled to Kabul, later joining Atef when he realised no American reprisal attacks were forthcoming.

On October 10, 2001, al-Zawahiri appeared on the initial list of the U.S. Federal Bureau of Investigation's top 22 Most Wanted Terrorists, which was released to the public by U.S. President George W. Bush. In early November 2001, the Taliban government announced they were bestowing official Afghan citizenship on him, as well as Bin Laden, Mohammed Atef, Saif al-Adl, and Shaykh Asim Abdulrahman.

=== Organizations ===
==== Egyptian Islamic Jihad ====
Al-Zawahiri began reconstituting the Egyptian Islamic Jihad (EIJ) along with other exiled militants.

In Peshwar, al-Zawahiri was thought to have become radicalized by other Al-Jihad members, abandoning his old strategy of a swift coup d'état to change society from above, and embracing the idea of takfir. In 1991, EIJ broke with al-Zumur, and al-Zawahiri grabbed "the reins of power" to become EIJ leader.

Ayman al-Zawahiri was previously the second and last "emir" of the Egyptian Islamic Jihad, having succeeded Abbud al-Zumar in the latter role when Egyptian authorities sentenced al-Zumar to life imprisonment. Ayman al-Zawahiri eventually became one of Egyptian Islamic Jihad's leading organizers and recruiters. Al-Zawahiri's hope was to recruit military officers and accumulate weapons, waiting for the right moment to launch "a complete overthrow of the existing order." Chief strategist of Al-Jihad was Aboud al-Zumar, a colonel in the military intelligence whose plan was to kill the main leaders of the country, capture the headquarters of the army and State Security, the telephone exchange building, and of course the radio and television building, where news of the Islamic revolution would then be broadcast, unleashing – he expected – "a popular uprising against secular authority all over the country."

==== Maktab al-Khadamat ====
In Peshawar, he made contact with Osama bin Laden, who was running a base for mujahideen called Maktab al-Khadamat (MAK); founded by the Palestinian Sheikh Abdullah Yusuf Azzam. The radical position of al-Zawahiri and the other militants of Al-Jihad put them at odds with Sheikh Azzam, with whom they competed for bin Laden's financial resources. Al-Zawahiri carried two false passports, a Swiss one in the name of Amin Uthman and a Dutch one in the name of Mohmud Hifnawi.

British journalist Jason Burke wrote: "Al-Zawahiri ran his own operation during the Afghan war, bringing in and training volunteers from the Middle East. Some of the $500 million the CIA poured into Afghanistan reached his group."

Former FBI agent Ali Soufan mentioned in his book The Black Banners that Ayman al-Zawahiri is suspected of ordering Azzam's assassination in 1989.

==== Al-Qaeda ====
According to reports by a former al-Qaeda member, al-Zawahiri worked in the al-Qaeda organization since its inception and was a senior member of the group's shura council. He was often described as a "lieutenant" to Osama bin Laden, though bin Laden's chosen biographer has referred to him as the "real brains" of al-Qaeda.

On February 23, 1998, al-Zawahiri issued a joint fatwa with Osama bin Laden under the title "World Islamic Front Against Jews and Crusaders". Al-Zawahiri, not bin Laden, is thought to have been the actual author of the fatwa.

Bin Laden and al-Zawahiri organized an al-Qaeda congress on June 24, 1998. A week prior to the beginning of the conference, a group of well-armed assistants to al-Zawahiri had left by jeeps in the direction of Herat. Following the instructions of their patron, in the town of Koh-i-Doshakh, they met three unknown Slavic-looking men who had arrived from Russia via Iran. After their arrival in Kandahar, they split up. One of the Russians was directly escorted to al-Zawahiri and he did not participate in the conference. Western military intelligence succeeded in acquiring photographs of him, but he disappeared for six years. According to Axis Globe, in 2004, when Qatar and the U.S. investigated Russian embassy officials whom the United Arab Emirates had arrested in connection to the murder of Zelimkhan Yandarbiyev in Qatar, computer software precisely established that a man who had walked to the Russian embassy in Doha was the same one who visited al-Zawahiri prior to the Al-Qaida conference.

Al-Zawahiri was placed under international sanctions in 1999 by the United Nations' Al-Qaida and Taliban Sanctions Committee as a member of the Salafi-jihadist group al-Qaeda.

In June 2001, al-Zawahiri formally merged the Egyptian Islamic Jihad into al-Qaeda.

In late 2001, a computer was seized that was stolen from an office used by al-Qaeda immediately after the fall of Kabul in November. This computer was mainly used by al-Zawahiri and contained the fraudulent letter used to arrange the meeting between two al-Qaeda attackers posing as journalists and Ahmad Shah Massoud. The journalists who conducted the interview assassinated Massoud on September 9, 2001.

===== Emergence as al-Qaeda's chief commander =====
In late 2004 bin Laden named al-Zawahiri officially as his deputy. On April 30, 2009, the U.S. State Department reported that al-Zawahiri had emerged as al-Qaeda's operational and strategic commander, and that Osama bin Laden was now only the ideological figurehead of the organization. After the 2011 death of bin Laden, a senior U.S. intelligence official said intelligence gathered in the raid showed that bin Laden remained deeply involved in planning: "This compound (where bin Laden was killed) in Abbottabad was an active command-and-control center for al-Qaeda's leader. He was active in operational planning and in driving tactical decisions within al-Qaeda."

Following the death of bin Laden, former U.S. Deputy National Security Advisor for Combating Terrorism Juan Zarate said that al-Zawahiri would "clearly assume the mantle of leadership" of al-Qaeda. A senior U.S. administration official said that although al-Zawahiri was likely to be al-Qaeda's next leader, his authority was not "universally accepted" among al-Qaeda's followers, particularly in the Gulf region. Zarate said that al-Zawahiri was more controversial and less charismatic than bin Laden. Rashad Mohammad Ismail (AKA "Abu Al-Fida"), a leading member of al-Qaeda in the Arabian Peninsula, stated that al-Zawahiri was the best candidate.

Hamid Mir is reported to have said that he believed that Ayman al-Zawahiri was the operational head of al-Qaeda, and that "[h]e is the person who can do the things that happened on September 11." Within days of the attacks, al-Zawahiri's name was put forward as bin Laden's second-in-command, with reports suggesting he represented "a more formidable US foe than bin Laden."

===== Formal appointment =====
Al-Zawahiri became the leader of al-Qaeda following the May 2, 2011 killing of Osama bin Laden. His succession to that role was announced on several of their websites on June 16, 2011. On the same day, al-Qaeda renewed its position that Israel was an illegitimate state and that it would not accept any compromise on Palestine.

The delayed announcement led some analysts to speculate that there was quarreling within al-Qaeda: "It doesn't suggest a vast reservoir of accumulated goodwill for him," said one celebrity journalist on CNN. Both U.S. Secretary of Defense Robert Gates and Chairman of the Joint Chiefs of Staff Mike Mullen maintain that the delay didn't signal any kind of dispute within al-Qaeda, and Mullen reiterated U.S. death threats toward al-Zawahiri. According to US officials within the Obama administration and Robert Gates, al-Zawahiri would find the leadership difficult as, while intelligent, he lacks combat experience and the charisma of Osama bin Laden.

=== Alleged activities in Iran ===
It has been alleged that Al-Zawahiri, a Sunni, worked with the Shias of the Islamic Republic of Iran on behalf of al-Qaeda. Author Lawrence Wright wrote that an EIJ operative named Ali Mohammed "told the FBI that al-Jihad had planned a coup in Egypt in 1990." Wright claimed that Ali Mohammed "offered Iran information about an Egyptian government plan to storm several islands in the Persian Gulf" that both Iran and the United Arab Emirates lay claim to. According to Wright's account of Mohammed's alleged testimony, in return for this information, the Iranian government paid al-Zawahiri $2 million and helped train members of al-Jihad in a coup attempt that never actually took place.

Al-Zawahiri has repeatedly and harshly denounced the Iranian government. In December 2007, he stated, "We discovered Iran collaborating with America in its invasions of Afghanistan and Iraq." In the same video messages, he chides Iran for "repeating the ridiculous joke that says that al-Qaida and the Taliban are agents of America," before playing a video clip in which Ayatollah Rafsanjani says, "In Afghanistan - they were present in Afghanistan, because of Al-Qa'ida; and the Taliban, who created the Taliban? America is the one who created the Taliban, and America's friends in the region are the ones who financed and armed the Taliban."

Al-Zawahiri's further criticized Iran's government, stating

Despite Iran's repetition of the slogan "Death to America, death to Israel", we haven't heard even one fatwa from one Shia authority, whether in Iran or elsewhere, calling for jihad against the Americans in Iraq and Afghanistan.

Al-Zawahiri said that "Iran stabbed a knife into the back of the Islamic Nation."

In April 2008, al-Zawahiri blamed Iranian state media and Al-Manar for perpetuating the "lie" that "there are no heroes among the Sunnis who can hurt America as no-one else did in history" in order to discredit the Al Qaeda network.

On the seventh anniversary of the attacks of September 11, 2001, al-Zawahiri released a 90-minute tape in which he blasted "the guardian of Muslims in Tehran" for recognizing "the two hireling governments" in Iraq and Afghanistan.

=== Involvement in Chechnya ===
At some point in 1994, al-Zawahiri was said to have "become a phantom" but is thought to have traveled widely to "Switzerland and Sarajevo". A fake passport he was using shows that he traveled to Malaysia, Taiwan, Singapore, and Hong Kong.

On December 1, 1996, Ahmad Salama Mabruk and Mahmud Hisham al-Hennawi – both carrying false passports – accompanied al-Zawahiri on a trip to Chechnya, where they hoped to re-establish the faltering Jihad. Their leader was traveling under the pseudonym Abdullah Imam Mohammed Amin, and trading on his medical credentials for legitimacy. The group switched vehicles three times, but were arrested within hours of entering Russian territory and spent five months in a Makhachkala prison awaiting trial. The trio pleaded innocence, maintaining their disguise while other al-Jihad members from Bavari-C sent the Russian authorities pleas for leniency for their "merchant" colleagues who had been wrongly arrested. Russian Member of Parliament Nadyr Khachiliev echoed the pleas for their speedy release as al-Jihad members Ibrahim Eidarous and Tharwat Salah Shehata traveled to Dagestan to plead for their release. Shehata received permission to visit the prisoners. He is believed to have smuggled $3000 to them, which was later confiscated, and to have given them a letter which the Russians didn't bother to translate. In April 1997 the trio were sentenced to six months, were subsequently released a month later, and absconded without paying their court-appointed attorney Abulkhalik Abdusalamov his $1,800 legal fee, citing "poverty". Shehata was sent on to Chechnya where he met with Ibn Khattab.

=== Contacts with Russia ===
The true nature of al-Zawahiri's alleged encounters with Russian agencies in 1996 remains a matter of controversy. What is a widely agreed upon fact is that al-Zawahiri, identified as an "Egyptian doctor", along with two Arab militants, were arrested in December 1996 by the border authorities of the Republic of Dagestan for illegally trying to cross over to the neighboring territory of Chechnya, whose rebellion was at the time in temporary hold following the Khasavyurt Accord. The three men were held for approximately six months in a Makhachkala prison and interrogated by the Dagestani and Russian authorities. The Sunday Times wrote that the Russian Federal Security Service failed to properly identify al-Zawahiri, at the time wanted for terrorist activities in Egypt. The three men were tried for attempting to illegally enter Russian territory and sentenced to prison time. They were all released in May 1997. Jamestown Foundation scholar and former representative of the Soviet Communist Party's International Department Evgenii Novikov has argued that the Russians would have likely been able to determine who he was, even pre-"9/11", given Russia's well-trained Arabists and the suspicious fact of Muslims crossing their borders illegally, carrying false Arabic false identities and encrypted documents, at a time when the Russian state was engaged in the suppression of the Muslim rebels in Chechnya.

Former FSB secret service officer Alexander Litvinenko, subsequently a victim of assassination, alleged, among other things, that al-Zawahiri, instead of doing time in prison, was "trained" by the FSB and also that he was not the only link between al-Qaeda and the Russian intelligence services. Voice of America commentator and former KGB officer Konstantin Preobrazhenskiy supported Litvinenko's claim, stating that Litvinenko "was responsible for securing the secrecy of Al-Zawahiri's arrival in Russia, who was trained by FSB instructors in Dagestan, Northern Caucasus, during 1996–1997."

=== Activities in Egypt ===
Al-Zawahiri was convicted of dealing in weapons and received a three-year sentence, which he completed in 1984, shortly after his conviction.

Al-Zawahiri learned of a "Nonviolence Initiative" organized in Egypt to end the terror campaign that had killed hundreds and resulting government crackdown that had imprisoned thousands. Al-Zawahiri angrily opposed this "surrender" in letters to the London newspaper Al-Sharq al-Awsat. Together with members of al-Gama'a al-Islamiyya, he helped organize a massive attack on tourists at the Temple of Hatshepsut to sabotage the initiative by provoking the government into repression.

The attack by six men dressed in police uniforms succeeded in machine-gunning and hacking to death 58 foreign tourists and four Egyptians, including "a five-year-old British child and four Japanese couples on their honeymoons," and devastated the Egyptian tourist industry for a number of years. Nonetheless, the Egyptian reaction was not what al-Zawahiri had hoped for. The attack so stunned and angered Egyptian society that Islamists denied responsibility. Al-Zawahiri blamed the police for the killing, but also held the tourists responsible for their own deaths for coming to Egypt,

The people of Egypt consider the presence of these foreign tourists to be aggression against Muslims and Egypt... The young men are saying that this is our country and not a place for frolicking and enjoyment, especially for you.

Al-Zawahiri was sentenced to death in absentia in 1999 by an Egyptian military tribunal.

=== Activities and whereabouts after the September 11 attacks ===
In December 2001, al-Zawahiri published a book entitled Fursan Taht Rayat al Nabi (Knights Under the Prophet's Banner) which outlined ideologies of al-Qaeda. English translations of this book were published; excerpts are available online.

...The second power depends on God alone, then on its wide popularity and alliance with other jihad movements throughout the Islamic nation, from Chechnya in the north to Somalia in the south and from "Eastern Turkestan in the east to Morocco in the west.

...It seeks revenge against the gang-leaders of global unbelief, the United States, Russia, and Israel. It demands the blood price for the martyrs, the mothers' grief, the deprived orphans, the suffering prisoners, and the torments of those who are tortured everywhere in the Islamic lands―from Turkistan in the east to Andalusia.

...It also gave young Muslim mujahidin―Arabs, Pakistanis, Turks, and Muslims from Central and East Asia―a great opportunity to get acquainted with each other on the land of Afghan jihad through their comradeship-at-arms against the enemies of Islam.

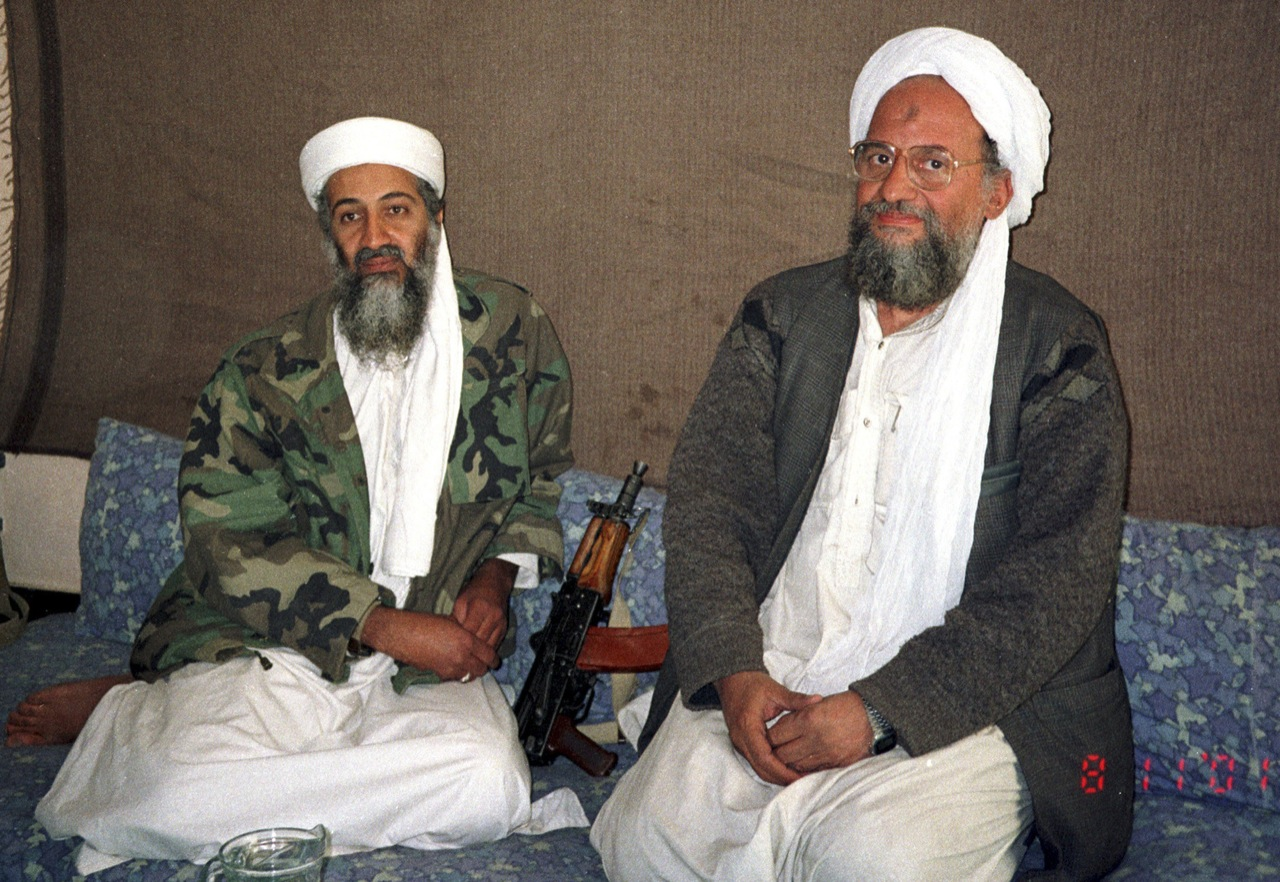
Osama bin Laden sits with his adviser al-Zawahiri during an interview with Pakistani journalist Hamid Mir, in November 2001.

Following the U.S. invasion of Afghanistan, al-Zawahiri's whereabouts were unknown, but he was generally thought to be in tribal Pakistan. Although he released videos of himself frequently, al-Zawahiri did not appear alongside bin Laden in any of them after 2003. In 2003, it was rumored that he was under arrest in Iran, although this was later discovered to be false.

On January 13, 2006, the Central Intelligence Agency, aided by Pakistan's ISI, launched an airstrike on Damadola, a Pakistani village near the Afghan border where they believed al-Zawahiri was located. The airstrike was supposed to kill al-Zawahiri and this was reported in international news over the following days. Many victims of the airstrike were buried unidentified. Anonymous U.S. government officials claimed that some terrorists were killed and the Bajaur tribal area government confirmed that at least four terrorists were among the dead. Anti-American protests broke out around the country and the Pakistani government condemned the U.S. attack and the loss of innocent life.

On August 1, 2008, CBS News reported that it had obtained a copy of an intercepted letter dated July 29, 2008, from unnamed sources in Pakistan, which urgently requested a doctor to treat al-Zawahiri. The letter indicated that al-Zawahiri was critically injured in a US missile strike at Azam Warsak village in South Waziristan on July 28 that also reportedly killed al Qaeda explosives expert Abu Khabab al-Masri. Taliban Mehsud spokesman Maulvi Umar told the Associated Press on August 2, 2008, that the report of al-Zawahiri's injury was false.

In early September 2008, Pakistan Army claimed that they "almost" captured al-Zawahiri after getting information that he and his wife were in the Mohmand Agency, in northwest Pakistan. After raiding the area, officials didn't find him.

== General Emir of al-Qaeda ==
In two videos posted on Jihadist websites in 2012, al-Zawahiri called on Muslims to "capture" foreign citizens to leverage the release of Omar Abdel-Rahman, mastermind of the 1993 World Trade Center bombing.

In June 2013, al-Zawahiri arbitrated against the merger of the Islamic State of Iraq with the Syrian-based Jabhat al-Nusra into Islamic State of Iraq and the Levant as was declared in April by Abu Bakr al-Baghdadi. Ahmed al-Sharaa, then leader of al-Nusra Front, affirmed the group's allegiance to al-Qaeda and al-Zawahiri.

In September 2015, al-Zawahiri urged Islamic State (ISIL) to stop fighting al-Nusra Front, the official al-Qaeda affiliate in Syria, and to unite with all other jihadists against the supposed alliance between America, Russia, Europe, Shiites and Iran, and Bashar al-Assad's Alawite regime.

Ayman al-Zawahiri released a statement supporting jihad in Xinjiang against Chinese, jihad in the Caucasus against the Russians and naming Somalia, Yemen, Syria, Iraq and Afghanistan as battlegrounds. al-Zawahiri endorsed "jihad to liberate every span of land of the Muslims that has been usurped and violated, from Kashgar to Andalusia, and from the Caucasus to Somalia and Central Africa". Uyghurs inhabit Kashgar, the city which was mentioned by al-Zawahiri. In another statement he said, "My mujahideen brothers in all places and of all groups ... we face aggression from America, Europe, and Russia ... so it's up to us to stand together as one from East Turkestan to Morocco". In 2015, the Turkistan Islamic Party (East Turkistan Islamic Movement) released an image showing Al Qaeda leaders Ayman al-Zawahiri and Osama Bin Laden meeting with Hasan Mahsum.

The Uyghurs East Turkestan independence movement was endorsed in the serial "Islamic Spring"'s 9th release by Al-Zawahiri. Al-Zawahiri confirmed that the Afghanistan war after 9/11 included the participation of Uyghurs and that the jihadists like Zarwaqi, Bin Ladin and the Uyghur Hasan Mahsum were provided with refuge together in Afghanistan under Taliban rule. Uyghur fighters were praised by al-Zawahiri, before a Turkistan Islamic Party performed a Bishkek bombing on August 30. Uighur jihadists were hailed by Ayman al-Zawahiri.

Doğu Türkistan Bülteni Haber Ajansı reported that the Uyghur Turkistan Islamic Party was praised by Abu Qatada along with Abdul Razzaq al Mahdi, Maqdisi, Muhaysini and al-Zawahiri.

Abu Muhammad al-Maqdisi and Abu Qatada were referenced by Muhaysini. Osama bin Laden and al-Zawahiri were lauded by Muhaysini.

The Rewards for Justice Program of the U.S. Department of State offered a reward of up to US$25 million for information about al-Zawahiri's location.

On July 31, 2022, al-Zawahiri was killed in a US strike in Kabul, Afghanistan. He had been rumoured to be in Pakistan's tribal area or inside Afghanistan. His death is considered to be the biggest hit to the terrorist group since Osama Bin Laden was killed in 2011. Others described his death as "anticlimactic to Al Qaeda's demise", stating "[h]is moves as leader of the shrinking group were watched more by analysts than by jihadists" at the time of his death.

=== Promotional activities ===
Al-Zawahiri placed supreme importance on winning public support, and castigated Abu Musab al-Zarqawi in this regard: "In the absence of this popular support, the Islamic mujahid movement would be crushed in the shadows."

==== Video and audio messages ====
===== 2000s =====
- August 4, 2005: al-Zawahiri issues a televised statement blaming former British prime minister Tony Blair and his government's foreign policy for the 7 July 2005 London bombings.
- September 1, 2005: al-Jazeera broadcasts a video message from Mohammed Sidique Khan, one of bombers of the London Underground. His message is followed by another message from al-Zawahiri, blaming again Tony Blair for the 7/7 bombings.
- September 19, 2005: al-Zawahiri claims responsibility for the London bombings and dismisses U.S. efforts in Afghanistan.
- April 3, 2008: al-Zawahiri said that al-Qaeda doesn't kill innocents and that its [former] leader Osama bin Laden is healthy. The questions asked his views about Egypt and Iraq, as well as Hamas.
- April 22, 2008: An audio interview in which, among other subjects, al-Zawahiri attacks the Shiite Iran and Hezbollah for blaming the 9/11 attacks on Israel, and thus discrediting al-Qaeda.
- On the 7th anniversary of the attacks of September 11, 2001, al-Zawahiri released a 90-minute tape, in which he blasted "the guardian of Muslims in Tehran" for "the two hireling governments" in Iraq and Afghanistan.
- January 7, 2009: An audio message released, where al-Zawahiri vows revenge for Israel's air and ground assault on Gaza and calls the Jewish state's actions against Hamas militants "a gift" from U.S. President-elect Barack Obama for the recent uprising conflict in Gaza.
- October 4, 2009: The New York Times reported that al-Zawahiri had asserted that Libya had tortured Ibn Al Sheikh Al Libi to death. Al Libi was a key source the George W. Bush Presidency had claimed established that Iraq had provided training to al-Qaeda in Iraq's weapons of mass destruction.
- December 14, 2009: In an audio recording released on December 14, 2009, al-Zawahiri renewed calls to establish an Islamic state in Israel and urged his followers to "seek jihad against Jews" and their supporters. He also called for jihad against America and the West, and labeled Egyptian president Hosni Mubarak, King Abdullah II of Jordan, and King Abdullah bin Abdulaziz of Saudi Arabia as the "brothers of Satan".

===== 2010s =====
- June 8, 2011: al-Zawahiri released his first video since the killing of Osama bin Laden, praising bin Laden and warning the U.S. of reprisal attacks, but without staking a claim on the leadership of al-Qaeda.
- September 3, 2014: In a 55-minute-long video, al-Zawahiri announced the formation of a new wing called al-Qaeda in the Indian Subcontinent (AQIS), which would wage jihad "to liberate its land, to restore its sovereignty, and to revive its Caliphate." Reaction amongst Muslims in India to the formation of the new wing was one of fury.
- March 2018: al-Zawahiri posts a video entitled "America is the First Enemy of the Muslims", where he defends the Muslim Brotherhood and claims that the US is "working with Saudi Arabia to train imams and rewrite religious textbooks". This is his sixth video in 2018. He refers to Rex Tillerson's firing as US Secretary of State in the Trump administration.
- September 11, 2019: al-Zawahiri posts a 9/11 18th anniversary propaganda video entitled "And They Shall Continue to Fight You" through al-Qaeda media outlet As Sahab. Al-Zawahiri condemns Islamic scholars who condemned al-Qaeda for the 9/11 attacks and continues to call for jihad regarding Israel and Palestine. Clips of Donald Trump and Benjamin Netanyahu were inter-spaced in the video.

===== 2020s =====
- In September 2021, on the 20th anniversary of the 9/11 attacks, after a month of Taliban takeover in Afghanistan, a video of al-Zawahiri surfaced, but he did not mention the Taliban takeover.
- In April 2022, al-Zawahiri's video was released on the hijab controversy in the Indian state of Karnataka, where he expressed support for a student who wore a burqa to her college.

==== Online Q&A ====
In mid-December 2007, al-Zawahiri's spokespeople announced plans for an "open interview" on a handful of Islamic Web sites. The administrators of four known jihadist web sites have been authorized to collect and forward questions, "unedited", they pledge, and "regardless of whether they are in support of or are against" al-Qaeda, which would be forwarded to al-Zawahiri on January 16. al-Zawahiri responded to the questions later in 2008; among the things he said were that al-Qaeda didn't kill innocents, and that al-Qaeda would move to target Israel "after expelling the occupier from Iraq".

== Views ==
=== Islamism ===
As a leader of Egyptian Islamic Jihad, al-Zawahiri conceived of Islamism in Egypt as a revolutionary movement of heroic fighters who the masses would join in the wake of their victories. The movement was mostly a failure, including its crushing defeat and suppression by the Egyptian government following the assassination of Anwar Sadat. The popular uprising envisioned by al-Zawahiri never came to be, and some Islamist leaders agreed to cease-fire terms with the government. After these events, al-Zawahiri joined Al-Qaeda, which had aims that were international in scope and was focused on the conflict with the United States rather than the ongoing localized conflict with the secular regime in Egypt.

=== Loyalty and enmity ===
In a lengthy treatise titled "Loyalty and Enmity", al-Zawahiri said that Muslims must at all times be loyal to Islam and to one another, while hating or avoiding everything and everyone outside of Islam.

=== Female combatants ===
Al-Zawahiri said in an April 2008 interview that the group does not have women combatants and that a woman's role is limited to caring for the homes and children of al-Qaeda fighters. This resulted in a debate regarding the role of mujahid women like Sajida Mubarak Atrous al-Rishawi.

=== Iranians ===
In 2008 he claimed that "Persians" are the enemy of Arabs and that Iran cooperated with the U.S. during the occupation of Iraq.

== Death ==
President Biden delivers remarks confirming that the US military executed a targeted killing of al-Zawahiri.

Al-Zawahiri was killed on July 31, 2022, shortly after 6:00 a.m. local time in an early-morning drone strike conducted by the U.S. Central Intelligence Agency in the upscale Sherpur neighborhood of Kabul, reportedly in a house owned by a top aide to Sirajuddin Haqqani, the Interior Minister in the Taliban government.

In a statement to reporters, a senior administration official said "over the weekend, the United States conducted a counterterrorism operation against a significant Al Qaeda target in Afghanistan. The operation was successful and there were no civilian casualties." The United States Department of Defense denied responsibility for the strike, while the United States Central Command declined to comment. On August 1, delayed by two days to allow time for proper verification of the operation's success, President Joe Biden announced at the White House that the U.S. Intelligence Community had located al-Zawahiri as he moved into downtown Kabul in early 2022 and that President Biden had authorized the operation a week prior. Biden also stated that the operation did not harm any members of al-Zawahiri's family or other civilians.

According to U.S. government sources, Al-Zawahiri was killed by Hellfire missiles fired from a Reaper drone. Press sources have speculated that the missiles may have been R9X Hellfire missiles, which are designed to kill by impact and with blades instead of explosion to avoid unintended casualties.

Al Qaeda in December 2022 released a video it stated was narrated by al-Zawahiri. The video was undated and did not mention when the recording of the audio was done. In February 2023, the United Nations reported that many member countries believed Saif al-Adel to be the de facto successor of al-Zawahiri, but al-Qaeda had not formally named him to probably avoid scrutiny against the Taliban for giving shelter to the latter and due to al-Adel living in Iran.

== Publications ==
- Fursan Taht Rayat al Nabi (Knights Under the Prophet's Banner)
- Co-author of Fatāwa of Osama bin Laden (1998)
- World Islamic Front Statement (1998)

== See also ==
- FBI Most Wanted Terrorists
- List of fugitives from justice who disappeared
- Sayyed Imam Al-Sharif
- Videos and audio recordings of Osama bin Laden

== Notes and references ==
=== Works cited ===
- Bergen, Peter L. (2006). The Osama bin Laden I Know. Free Press. ISBN 978-0-7432-7891-1.
- Wright, Lawrence (2006). The Looming Tower (PDF). Knopf. ISBN 0-375-41486-X. Archived from the original (PDF) on March 8, 2014.

=== General references ===
- al-Zawahiri, Ayman, L'absolution, Milelli, Villepreux, ISBN 978-2-916590-05-9 (French translation of Al-Zawahiri's latest book).
- Ibrahim, Raymond (2007), The Al Qaeda Reader, Broadway Books, ISBN 978-0-7679-2262-3.
- Kepel, Gilles; & Jean-Pierre Milelli (2010), Al Qaeda in Its Own Words, Harvard University Press, Cambridge & London, ISBN 978-0-674-02804-3.
- Mansfield, Laura (2006), His Own Words: A Translation of the Writings of Dr. Ayman Al Zawahiri, Lulu Pub.
