= Messages to the World =

2005 book collecting the words of Osama bin Laden

- Editor: Bruce Lawrence
- Author: Osama bin Laden
- Translator: James Howarth
- Language: English
- Genre: Nonfiction
- Publisher: Verso Books
- Publication date: November 28, 2005
- Media type: Print
- Pages: 292
- ISBN: 1-84467-045-7

Messages to the World: The Statements of Osama bin Laden is a 292-page book published by Verso Books which documents 24 translated public statements by Osama bin Laden from December 29, 1994 through December 16, 2004.

Published on November 28, 2005, the book was edited and introduced by professor and scholar Bruce Lawrence, with translations by James Howarth.

== Description ==
Despite the saturation of global media coverage, Osama bin Laden's own writings have been absent from analysis of the "war on terror". Over the last ten years, bin Laden has issued a series of carefully tailored public statements, from interviews with Western and Arabic journalists to faxes and video recordings. These texts supply evidence crucial to an understanding of the mixture of Quranic scholarship, CIA training, punctual interventions in Gulf politics and messianic anti-imperialism that has formed the programmatic core of al-Qaeda.

In bringing together the various statements issued under bin Laden's name since 1994, this volume forms part of a growing discourse that seeks to demythologize the terrorist network. Newly translated from the Arabic, annotated with a critical introduction by Islamic scholar Bruce Lawrence, this collection places the statements in their religious, historical and political context. It shows how bin Laden's views draw on and differ from other strands of radical Islamic thought; it also demonstrates how his arguments vary in degrees of consistency, and how his evasions concerning the true nature and extent of his own group, and over his own role in terrorist attacks, have contributed to the perpetuation of his personal mythology.

On the dust jacket, Michael Scheuer, a former senior CIA analyst and chief of the Bin Laden Issue Station (aka "Alec Station"), the Osama bin Laden tracking unit at the Counterterrorism Center from 1996 to 1999, stated that:

"Western media have made no consistent effort to publish Bin Laden's statements, thereby failing to give their audience the words that put his thoughts and actions in cultural and historical context ... Bin Laden has been precise in telling America the reasons he is waging war on us. None of the reasons has anything to do with our freedom, liberty and democracy but everything to do with US policies and actions in the Muslim world."

In the book's introduction, Bruce Bennett Lawrence defends bin Laden against "widespread revulsion" towards him in the West, stating "everything he has written falls within the framework of a reaction against aggression, for which he has strong scriptural support," and that "he continues to be ... admired and even trusted by ordinary people in the Middle East"; but also regrets that "the word 'imperialism' does not occur once in any of the messages he has sent out," nor is there any "social dimension" or "alternative conception of the ideal society".

== See also ==
- Interviews of Osama bin Laden
- Videos and audio recordings of Osama bin Laden
