= As-Sahab =

Media division of Al-Qaeda in Afghanistan and Pakistan

- As-Sahab Foundation for Media Productions
- مؤسسة السحاب للإنتاج الإعلامي
- Founded: 2000; 26 years ago
- Headquarters: Afghanistan, Pakistan
- Official language: Arabic; English; Urdu; Pashto
- Leader: Abd al-Rahman al-Maghribi
- Affiliations: Al-Qaeda
- Website: https://al-sahab.co/

As-Sahab Media (Arabic: السحاب, "The Clouds") is the official media wing of Al-Qaeda's core leadership based in Pakistan and Afghanistan, as well as al-Qaeda in the Indian Subcontinent. It produces media featuring original sermons and speeches by senior Al-Qaeda commanders as well as footage of international operations carried out by Al-Qaeda. In addition to being released in Arabic, some published videos come with English subtitles.

As-Sahab produces "documentary-quality" videos and its first production under the name is believed to have been in 2001 with the involvement of Adam Yahiye Gadahn.

== Production ==
The organization uses modern technology to produce its videos. The release of the "5 Years After Tribute [Manhattan Raid]" video demonstrated a new standard comparing favorably with the production quality obtained by major television networks. Video and audio are (depending on the source material, some of which is dated) usually crisp, and subtitles are by and large free of grammatical and spelling errors and sometimes even explain Islam-specific concepts.

In 2005 a CBC program was released, called, Media Jihad - As-Sahab Foundation, which traces the origins of As-Sahab.

== Method of delivery ==
Previously, Al-Qaeda was known to deliver its videos and audio via a dead drop method using couriers carrying disks or drives. However, the method of delivery was changed in January 2006 after an airstrike on an Al-Qaeda meeting near Damadola, Pakistan. As-Sahab has since released its media on the web.

== Filmography ==
- Knowledge Is for Acting Upon: The Manhattan Raid (2006); a 97 minute video describing the motivations of the September 11 attacks
- America Burns (2021); a 14 minute video about American decline

== See also ==
- Amaq News Agency
- Umar Media
- Videos of Osama bin Laden
- Videos of Ayman al-Zawahiri
