= Videos and audio recordings of Osama bin Laden =

Recordings released to media (2001–2011)

There were many video and audio recordings released by Osama bin Laden between 2000 and his death in 2011.

Most of the tapes were released directly (by mail delivery messenger) to Arabic language satellite television networks, primarily Al Jazeera.

== Audios and videos ==
=== October 7, 2001 ===
Just after U.S. and NATO forces launched strikes in Afghanistan, bin Laden released a video tape, stating that "America has been hit by God at its most vulnerable point, destroying, thank God, its most prestigious buildings," referencing the September 11 attacks on the United States. He portrayed the attack as God's retaliation for suffering imposed on Muslims, particularly those in Palestine. Bin Laden did not claim responsibility for the attacks in the recording.

=== December 13, 2001 ===
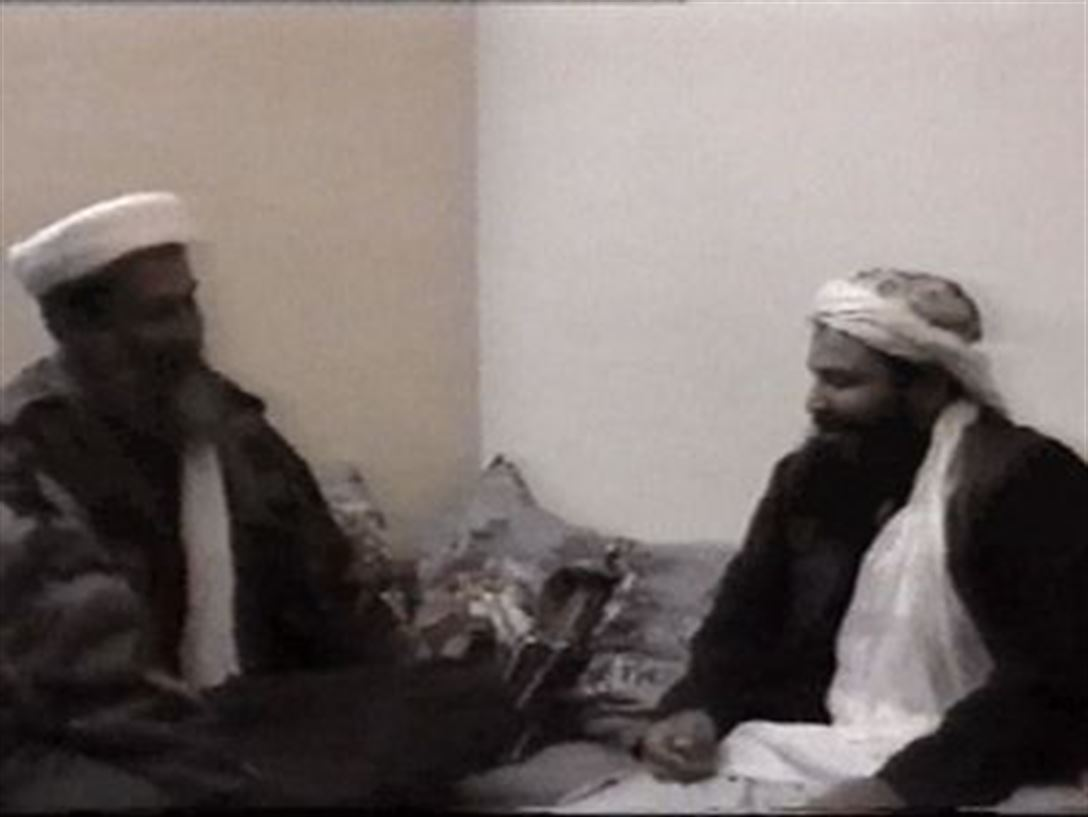
The Osama bin Laden video released on December 13, 2001

On November 10, 2001, U.S. military forces in Jalalabad found a video tape of bin Laden.

On December 13, 2001, the U.S. State Department released a video tape apparently showing bin Laden speaking with Khaled al-Harbi and other associates, somewhere in Afghanistan, before the U.S. invasion had driven the Taliban regime from Kandahar. The State Department stated that the tape was captured by U.S. forces in Afghanistan during a raid on a house in Jalalabad. The tape was aired with an accompanying English translation. In this translation, Osama bin Laden displays knowledge of the timing of the actual attack a few days in advance; the translation attributes the following lines to bin Laden:

"we calculated in advance the number of casualties from the enemy, who would be killed based on the position of the tower. We calculated that the floors that would be hit would be three or four floors. I was the most optimistic of them all.... We had notification since the previous Thursday that the event would take place that day. We had finished our work that day and had the radio on.... Muhammad (Atta) from the Egyptian family (meaning the Al Qaida Egyptian group), was in charge of the group.... The brothers, who conducted the operation, all they knew was that they have a martyrdom operation and we asked each of them to go to America but they didn't know anything about the operation, not even one letter. But they were trained and we did not reveal the operation to them until they are there and just before they boarded the planes."

On December 20, 2001, German TV channel "Das Erste" broadcast an analysis of the White House's translation of the videotape. On the program "Monitor", two independent translators and an expert on oriental studies found the White House's translation to be both inaccurate and manipulative stating "At the most important places where it is held to prove the guilt of bin Laden, it is not identical with the Arabic" and that the words used that indicate foreknowledge can not be heard at all in the original. Prof. Gernot Rotter, professor of Islamic and Arabic Studies at the Asia-Africa Institute at the University of Hamburg said "The American translators who listened to the tapes and transcribed them apparently wrote a lot of things in that they wanted to hear but that cannot be heard on the tape no matter how many times you listen to it."

In the recording, bin Laden describes attacks by the United States against Islamic people. He describes his message as a review of events following 9/11, and in this statement, he neither admits nor denies responsibility for the attacks.

=== February 11, 2003 ===
Colin Powell told a United States Senate panel that he'd reviewed a transcript of a message from bin Laden stating that he was in "a partnership with Iraq", which was to be broadcast on al Jazeera. Al Jazeera initially said they did not have the tape, but then said they received it the same day and broadcast it that evening at 8pm GMT. The quality of the recording was said to sound like bin Laden and to be "quite good" by The Guardian but "poor quality" by the BBC.

=== October 29, 2004 ===
Shortly before the U.S. presidential election on October 29, 2004, Arab television network al Jazeera broadcast an 18-minute video tape of Osama bin Laden, addressed to citizens of the United States. According to the English translation distributed by the BBC and other media outlets, he tells viewers he personally directed the 19 hijackers, and describes his motivation:

I will explain to you the reasons behind these events, and I will tell you the truth about the moments when this decision was taken, so that you can reflect on it. God knows that the plan of striking the towers had not occurred to us, but the idea came to me when things went just too far with the American-Israeli alliance's oppression and atrocities against our people in Palestine and Lebanon.

Bin Laden claimed he was inspired to destroy the World Trade Center after watching the destruction of towers in Lebanon by Israel during the 1982 Lebanon War.

=== November 3, 2004 ===
Bin Laden released another video tape, excoriating the West, the United Nations, and Israel, and explaining all of the unfolding events as fundamentally a religious war.

=== January 19, 2006 ===
Al Jazeera broadcast an audiotape of bin Laden addressing citizens of the United States again. It contained a warning that al-Qaeda was planning more attacks against the United States. The release of the tape came shortly after the United States' Central Intelligence Agency's Damadola airstrike in Pakistan, an attack that reportedly led to the deaths of Midhat Mursi, a veteran bomb and chemical expert and the head of an al-Qaeda training camp on the Afghanistan-Pakistan border, Khalid Habib, the al-Qaeda operations chief for Pakistan and Afghanistan, Abdul Rehman al Magrabi, a senior al-Qaeda operations commander, and 15 other people. Civilians were among the others killed, according to the Pakistani provincial government.

On the tape (which may have been recorded a month earlier), bin Laden boasted that "our situation is getting better, while your situation is getting worse." It also threatened future attacks on the United States, and simultaneously offered a "long truce", while not saying what the truce would involve. The White House immediately rejected the truce offer.

=== April 23, 2006 ===
Al Jazeera broadcast parts of an audiotape. On this tape, bin Laden accuses the Western world of waging a Zionist crusade against Islam. He comments on Hamas, Darfur and the situation in Iraq.

=== May 23, 2006 ===
Al Jazeera broadcast a 5-minute audiotape from bin Laden, where he claims he, alone, assigned the hijackers to perform the September 11 attacks. bin Laden comments on the trial of Zacarias Moussaoui, the prisoners in Guantanamo Bay, and the imprisoned journalists Sami al-Hajj and Tayssir Alouni, denying that any of them (apart from a few Guantanamo Bay prisoners) were connected with al-Qaeda.

Bin Laden tells viewers that Zacarias Moussaoui "had no connection at all with September 11. I am the one in charge of the 19 brothers and I never assigned brother Zacarias to be with them in that mission. I am certain of what I say because I was responsible for entrusting the 19 brothers... with the raids."

=== June 30, 2006 ===
An Islamist website posted a recording, in which bin Laden praised Abu Musab al-Zarqawi as a "lion of Jihad". The 19-minute video shows a still picture of bin Laden next to video celebrating al-Zarqawi. U.S. officials said that the tape was authentic.

=== July 14, 2007 ===
A few days after the Lal Masjid siege by the Pakistani government (and after a video released by al-Zawahiri), bin Laden released a tape. He was shown with a fatigued expression. He came out in a video clip less than a minute long on a militant website. BBC News reports that it was "undated and correspondents say it may be re-run footage. Its authenticity also cannot be independently verified."

=== September 6, 2007 ===
On September 6, 2007 an entirely new videotape of Osama bin Laden was aired. This was his first new appearance in almost three years. In the tape he mentions no acts of terrorism or war against the United States, but criticizes large corporations, Congressional Democrats, the War on Terror, and the PMs of Great Britain. He strongly urges individuals to convert to Islam. In the movie, bin Laden also mentions the new President of France and Global Warming.

During the video, bin Laden's image moves for only a total of 3½ minutes in two segments, staying frozen the rest of the time while his remarks continue. From bin Laden's mention of current events it appeared to indicate the video is recently made and thus also proving bin Laden is still alive, however the mentions of current events occur only in the frozen sections of the tape.

=== September 11, 2007 ===
A second video appeared purportedly featuring a eulogy by bin Laden to 9/11 hijacker Waleed al-Shehri. In the video, a voice identified as bin Laden's delivers the 14-minute introduction. The voice is heard over a still picture of bin Laden, dressed and groomed as he appears in the September 7, 2007, video. The 33-minute balance of the recording is a video will read by al-Shehri.

=== September 20, 2007 ===
An audio tape appeared with bin Laden's voice over previously released footage of him. In the audio tape, bin Laden called on Pakistanis to overthrow President Pervez Musharraf, promising what he called retaliation for the storming of the Red Mosque in the capital, Islamabad, in July.

=== November 29, 2007 ===
An audio tape appeared purportedly by bin Laden has urged European countries to end their military involvement in Afghanistan.

=== December 29, 2007 ===
In an audiotape Osama bin Laden warned Iraq's Sunni Arabs against fighting al-Qaeda and vowed to expand the group's Jihad to Israel, threatening "blood for blood, destruction for destruction."

The title of this message is "The Way To Frustrate The Conspiracies."

=== March 19, 2008 ===
On March 19, 2008, an audio tape appeared purportedly by bin Laden "threatens" the EU over the re-printing of a cartoon offensive to Muslims.

The title of this message is "May our Mothers be bereaved of us if we fail to help our Prophet."

=== March 20, 2008 ===
On March 20, 2008, a second audio tape appeared purportedly by bin Laden urging Palestinian militants to join the insurgency in Iraq.

=== May 16, 2008 ===
On May 16, 2008, an audio tape appeared purportedly by bin Laden issued to the Western People: "Reasons of the struggle on the occasion of the 60th anniversary of the founding of the occupying state of Israel" The message is 22 minutes, 41 seconds long. The message addresses the 60th anniversary of the founding of the state of Israel.

=== May 18, 2008 ===
On May 18, 2008, a second audio tape appeared purportedly by bin Laden issued 'A very strong statement to the Islamic nation and Muslims'. The second in three days, once again is an audio message, with no new imagery of bin Laden seen. A video version of the message was released showing an older still image of bin Laden while an audio message plays in the background.

=== January 14, 2009 ===
On January 14, 2009, a new audio recording purportedly by bin Laden posted on Islamist websites called for a new jihad over the Israeli offensive in Gaza and said the 2008 financial crisis has exposed the waning influence of the United States in world affairs and that it will in turn weaken its ally Israel. The recording was accompanied by a still photo of bin Laden superimposed over the al-Aqsa mosque in Jerusalem.

=== June 3, 2009 ===
According to a recording aired by Al Jazeera on June 3, bin Laden made a statement against President Barack Obama.

=== September 13, 2009 ===
On September 13, 2009, an audio recording purportedly by bin Laden was released on an Islamist website. For a transcript, see Bin Laden Statement (September 13, 2009).

=== September 25, 2009 ===
On September 25, 2009, a forum participant posted to a jihadist website links to download an audio statement from bin Ladin. The statement, entitled "A Message From Shaykh Osama bin Ladin to the People of Europe," is 4 minutes, 47 seconds, and in Arabic with German and English subtitles available. The video shows a still photograph of bin Laden.

For a transcript, see Bin Laden Statement (September 25, 2009)

=== January 24, 2010 ===
New audio tape released to Al Jazeera news features a voice claiming to be bin Laden taking credit for the attempted bombing by Umar Farouk Abdulmutallab. The authenticity of the tape has not yet been verified.

=== January 29, 2010 ===
A tape allegedly (remains unverified) from bin Laden was released by Al Jazeera, in which he excoriated the U.S. for its reluctance to address climate change. Bin Laden called for a worldwide boycott of American goods and the United States dollar in order to have a huge impact on the American economy.

=== March 25, 2010 ===
Another new audio tape allegedly from bin Laden was released by Al Jazeera. In this tape, he threatened that the execution of Khalid Sheikh Mohammed would result in al-Qaeda indefinitely murdering Americans in the event of their "falling into our hands".

=== October 1, 2010 ===
An audiotape allegedly featuring the voice of bin Laden surfaced on the Internet and addresses the flooding in Pakistan. The 11-minute tape, posted on militant websites Friday, focused on relief efforts and what can be done to prevent future natural disasters. In the recording, bin Laden reportedly urges a change in how governments execute relief work and calls for the creation of a relief group to study Muslim regions located near rivers and low-lying areas. He also calls for a greater investment in agriculture. The U.S.-based SITE Intelligence Group, which monitors jihadi forums, says the latest message is heard in a video featuring a photograph of bin Laden superimposed over images of aid distribution.

=== October 2, 2010 ===
The audio of a follow-up speech allegedly by bin Laden was released onto the internet. The title of the speech was "Help Your Pakistani Brothers" in which he expressed his feeling that the response of Arab and Muslim leaders to the Pakistani's affected by the flooding "did not match the level of the disaster" and that more people are affected by climate change than wars. The authenticity of the tape has not been independently verified.

=== January 21, 2011 ===
On January 21, 2011, bin Laden said the release of French hostages depends on a pullout of France's soldiers in Afghanistan and warned Paris of a "high price" for its policies. "We repeat the same message to you: The release of your prisoners in the hands of our brothers is linked to the withdrawal of your soldiers from our country," said the speaker on the audiotape broadcast on Al Jazeera television. This was the final tape released by Bin Laden prior to the confirmation of his death on May 2, 2011. A new audio message that Osama Bin Laden recorded before his death was released on May 7, 2011.

=== May 19, 2011 ===
A recording purported to have been made by bin Laden shortly before he died was released by al-Qaeda. In the message, he praised the revolutions in Tunisia and Egypt during the Arab Spring and speaks of a "rare historic opportunity" for Muslims to rise up. The 12-minute audio message came out on a video posted on Islamist websites, and has been translated by the SITE Institute.

== See also ==
- Interviews of Osama bin Laden – conversations between bin Laden and journalists from 1993–2001
- Messages to the World – a 2005 book of English-language translations of bin Laden's public statements from 1994-2004
- Osama Bin Laden Sings Poker Face – a 2011 hoax and viral video by Alison Jackson
