= Ali Saed Bin Ali El-Hoorie =

Saudi Arabian mass murderer

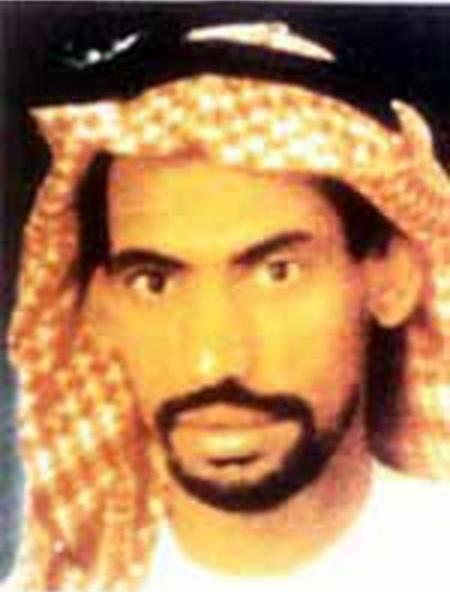
- Color mugshot of Ali Saed Bin Ali El-Hoorie
- Born: July 10 or 11, 1965; El Dibabiya, Saudi Arabia

Ali Saed Bin Ali El-Hoorie (Arabic: علي سعيد بن علي الحوري, born July 10 or 11, 1965) is wanted by the United States government in connection with the June 25, 1996, attack on the Khobar Towers complex near Dhahran, Saudi Arabia. He was indicted by a grand jury in the United States District Court for the Eastern District of Virginia on June 21, 2001, on 46 separate criminal counts including murder for his role in the attack. He was identified as the passenger in the bomb truck, which was driven to the complex by Ahmed Ibrahim Al-Mughassil, and which was then abandoned by both men as they fled to waiting cars minutes before the bomb truck blew up.

Months after his 2001 indictment in the 1996 attack, El-Hoorie, still a U.S. fugitive, was then placed on the initial list of the FBI's top 22 Most Wanted Terrorists, which was released to the public by President Bush on October 10, 2001.

El-Hoorie is very short at only 157 cm (5 ft 2 in), 59 kg (130 lb). He has a mole on his face. He is also known as Ali Saed Bin Ali Al-Houri.

He is alleged to be a member of the pro-Iran Saudi Hizballah, or Hizballah Al-Hijaz, meaning Party of God, being led by Al-Mughassil. The group is one of a number of related Hezbollah organizations operating in Saudi Arabia, Lebanon, Kuwait and Bahrain, among other places, and was outlawed in Saudi Arabia.

== Khobar Towers plot, 1993–1996 ==
The 2001 indictment traces the carefully organized 1996 bomb plot back to on or about 1993 when El-Hoorie was part of a team instructed by Al Mughassil to begin surveillance of Americans in Saudi Arabia, including at the location of Khobar Towers as early as 1994.

In early 1996, Al-Hoorie was part of the small team that began to hide explosives around the Khobar area.

In early June 1996, a tanker truck was purchased by the conspirators, and the indictment names El-Hoorie as one of the men who then spent two weeks converting the truck into a truck bomb. The cell finalized plans on the evening of June 25, 1996, for the attack that night.

When the Datsun signaled that all was clear by blinking its lights, the bomb truck, driven by Al-Mughassil and with El-Hoorie as a passenger, entered the lot and backed up against a fence in front of building # 131. Al-Mughassil and Al-Hoorie then exited the truck and entered the back seat of the Caprice for the getaway, driving away followed by the Datsun. In minutes, a massive explosion sheared the north face off Building 131. Nineteen American servicemen were killed, and 372 were wounded.

Although rooftop sentries were immediately suspicious of the truck – parked some 25 m (80 ft) from the building – and attempted an evacuation, few escaped. Comparable to 9,000 kg (20,000 lb) of TNT, the bomb was estimated to be larger than the one that destroyed the federal building in Oklahoma City, Oklahoma, US a year before, and more than twice as powerful as the 1983 bomb used at the Marine barracks in Beirut, Lebanon.

Immediately following the terrorist attack, the leaders fled the Khobar area and Saudi Arabia using fake passports.
