= Mustafa Mohamed Fadhil =

Egyptian al-Qaeda member (1976–2002)

- Born: 23 June 1976; Cairo, Egypt
- Died: March 2002 (aged 25); Shah-i-Kot Valley, Paktia Province, Afghanistan

Mustafa Mohamed Fadhil (Arabic: مصطفى محمد فضيل, also known as Abdul Wakil al-Masri) (23 June 1976 – March 2002) was a citizen of Kenya and Egypt, who was indicted in the United States for his part in the bombings of their embassies in Dar es Salaam, Tanzania, and Nairobi, Kenya.

== Accused activity ==
Fadhil was accused of preparing TNT and loading that TNT (plus other explosives) into the truck, which was used as a bomb in Tanzania. He was wanted on eleven counts of murder, several weapons and conspiracy charges, and charges which applied specifically to attacks against American government personnel and facilities.

Fadhil fled Nairobi to Karachi on 2 August 1998, on the same airliner as Sheikh Ahmed Salim Swedan.

Fadhil was on the FBI's Most Wanted Terrorists list from its inception on 10 October 2001. He served as Abdul Hadi al-Iraqi's second-in-command. A leaked Guantanamo Bay file and an interrogation of al-Qaeda operative Ahmed Khalfan Ghailani revealed that Fadhil was eventually killed in Afghanistan.

In May 2005, Fadhil's name was removed from both the FBI's list and the US State Department's Rewards for Justice list.

In December 2013, al-Qaeda spokesperson Adam Gadahn confirmed the death of Fadhil, referring to him as a "martyr".
