= FBI Most Wanted Terrorists =

List of most wanted terrorists sought by the FBI

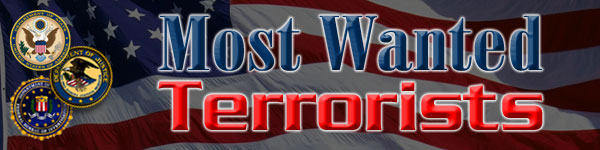
Banner used by the FBI since inception on October 10, 2001, as the main title for the web site pages of both the group of wanted terrorists, and also on the wanted poster of each suspected terrorist fugitive. The three overlapping seals on the left are the seal of the U.S. Department of State (similar to the Great Seal of the United States) and the seal of the Federal Bureau of Investigation while on the right is the seal of the U.S. Department of Justice.

The FBI Most Wanted Terrorists is a list created and first released on October 10, 2001, with the authority of United States president George W. Bush, following the September 11 attacks. Initially, the list contained 22 of the top suspected terrorists chosen by the FBI, all of whom had earlier been indicted for acts of terrorism between 1985 and 1998. None of the 22 had been captured by US or other authorities by that date. Of the 22, only Osama Bin Laden was by then already listed on the FBI Ten Most Wanted Fugitives list.

No particular legal consequences flowed from the creation of and inclusion on the list. On January 17, 2002, the FBI released a third major FBI wanted list, which has now become known as the FBI Seeking Information – Terrorism list, to enlist the public's help in reporting information which may prevent future terrorist attacks. The information sought to be reported is not necessarily relating to any person on any of the FBI wanted lists.

== Initial persons alleged to be terrorist fugitives ==
On the fugitive group wanted poster, the FBI did not list the persons in any particular stated order, except perhaps for the consistent placing of bin Laden in the number one position of the top row. However, the 22 can easily fit into distinct categories over the two decades, based on the terrorist attacks in which they were, according to US authorities, involved.

For organization and ease of reference here, the 22 on the list are grouped by the attack for which they were placed on the list.

Photo	Name	Alleged terrorist activity	Date of activity	Status
	Imad Mughniyeh	TWA Flight 847	June 14, 1985	Killed
Killed on February 12, 2008, by a car bomb that was detonated by the Mossad and the CIA as he passed by on foot in Damascus, Syria.
	Ali Atwa	TWA Flight 847	June 14, 1985	Deceased
Died of cancer in Lebanon in October 2021.
	Hassan Izz-Al-Din	TWA Flight 847	June 14, 1985	At large
	Abdul Rahman Yasin	1993 World Trade Center bombing	November 17, 1996	At large
Accused of constructing bombs in the 1993 World Trade Center bombing. Yasin was allegedly a prisoner of Saddam Hussein in 2002, but has since gone missing from Iraq. He was not located during the 2003 invasion of Iraq.
Khalid Shaikh Mohammed	Khalid Sheikh Mohammed	Bojinka plot	1994–1995	Captured
Khalid Shaikh Mohammed	Captured in Pakistan on March 1, 2003.			
	Ahmed Ibrahim Al-Mughassil	Khobar Towers bombing	June 25, 1996	At large
Al-Mughassil was captured in Lebanon on August 7, 2015, and extradited to Saudi Arabia. However, he was not taken into US custody and is still wanted by the FBI.
	Ali Saed Bin Ali El-Hoorie	Khobar Towers bombing	June 25, 1996	At large
	Ibrahim Salih Mohammed Al-Yacoub	Khobar Towers bombing	June 25, 1996	At large
	Abdelkarim Hussein Mohamed Al-Nasser	Khobar Towers bombing	June 25, 1996	At large
Alleged by the U.S. government to be the leader of Hezbollah Al-Hejaz.
Mohammed Atef	Mohammed Atef	1998 United States embassy bombings	August 7, 1998	Killed
Mohammed Atef	Killed in Afghanistan on November 14, 2001, by a Predator missile attack on his home outside of Kabul.			
Osama bin Laden	Osama bin Laden	1998 United States embassy bombings and the September 11th Attacks	August 7, 1998	Killed
Osama bin Laden	Killed by U.S. Navy Seals in a compound in Abbottabad, Pakistan; announced dead May 2, 2011. He was placed on the Most Wanted Terrorists list for his involvement in the bombings of the U.S. embassies in Nairobi, Kenya and Dar es Salaam, Tanzania.			
Ayman al-Zawahiri	Ayman al-Zawahiri	1998 United States embassy bombings and the September 11 attacks	August 7, 1998	Killed
Ayman al-Zawahiri	Osama bin-Laden's successor as Al-Qaeda's chieftain, Ayman al-Zawahiri was under indictment in the United States for his suspected role in the 1998 U.S. embassy bombings in Dar es Salaam, Tanzania, and Nairobi, Kenya. The Rewards for Justice Program of the U.S. Department of State was offering a reward of up to US$25 million for information about his location and capture. On July 31, 2022, he was killed by a drone strike in Kabul, Afghanistan carried out by the U.S. He is listed as deceased by the FBI.			
	Fazul Abdullah Mohammed	1998 United States embassy bombings	August 7, 1998	Killed
Reports surfaced on June 11, 2011, that he was killed in Somalia. Kenyan police stated, through DNA testing, that they were certain he was killed by Somalian forces on June 8. Officially listed as deceased on the FBI website by June 12.
	Mustafa Mohamed Fadhil	1998 United States embassy bombings	August 7, 1998	Killed
Killed in Afghanistan in March 2002. He was removed from the list in May 2005.
Fahid Mohammed Ally Msalam	Fahid Mohammed Ally Msalam	1998 United States embassy bombings	August 7, 1998	Killed
Fahid Mohammed Ally Msalam	Killed January 1, 2009, in an unmanned aerial strike in Pakistan along with Sheikh Ahmed Salim Swedan.			
Ahmed Khalfan Ghailani	Ahmed Ghailani	1998 United States embassy bombings	August 7, 1998	Captured
Ahmed Khalfan Ghailani	Captured in Pakistan on July 25, 2004, and later held in Guantanamo Bay, Cuba. Ghailani was tried by a civilian court in New York in 2010 and convicted of conspiring to bomb the American embassies in Tanzania and Kenya. The jury however acquitted him of all other 284 charges, including attempted murder.			
	Sheikh Ahmed Salim Swedan	1998 United States embassy bombings	August 7, 1998	Killed
Killed January 1, 2009, in an unmanned aerial strike in Pakistan along with Fahid Mohammed Ali Msalam.
	Abdullah Ahmed Abdullah	1998 United States embassy bombings	August 7, 1998	Killed
Abdullah, also known as Abu Mohammed al-Masri, was reportedly killed in Tehran, Iran, on August 7, 2020, by Israeli Mossad operatives acting on behalf of the United States government. His death was confirmed by U.S. Secretary of State Mike Pompeo on January 12, 2021, after being reported three months earlier.
	Abu Anas al-Libi	1998 United States embassy bombings	August 7, 1998	Died in captivity
Al-Libi was captured in Tripoli, Libya on October 5, 2013, by Delta Force commandos. Abu Anas al-Libi died on January 2, 2015, at a hospital in New York, aged 50, while in United States custody. He had liver disease as a result of hepatitis C.
	Saif al-Adel	1998 United States embassy bombings	August 7, 1998	At large
Believed to be the current de facto leader of al-Qaeda as of 2023.
Ahmed Mohammed Hamed Ali	Ahmed Mohammed Hamed Ali	1998 United States embassy bombings	August 7, 1998	Killed
Ahmed Mohammed Hamed Ali	Reported as killed in a drone strike in 2010 in Pakistan by the National Counterterrorism Center. He was removed from the list in 2012.			
	Muhsin Musa Matwalli Atwah	1998 United States embassy bombings	August 7, 1998	Killed
Killed April 12, 2006, along with 6 other alleged militants by Pakistani forces in a helicopter gunship raid on the village of Naghar Kalai near the Afghan border. Villagers reported that armed men removed the bodies. Atwah's death was confirmed by US officials on October 24, 2006, following DNA testing, and he was removed from the list.

== FBI Seeking Information – War on Terrorism list ==
Whereas the Most Wanted Terrorists list is reserved for terrorist fugitives who have been indicted by federal grand juries, the FBI recognized a further need to achieve a much quicker response time in order to prevent any future attacks which may be in the current planning stages. To enlist the public's help in this effort, the FBI sought a way to deliver the early known suspected terror attack information, often very limited, out to the public as quickly as possible. So, on January 17, 2002, the third major FBI wanted list was first released, which has now become known as the FBI Seeking Information – Terrorism list.

As the name of this list implies, the FBI's intent is to acquire any critical information from the public, as soon as possible, about the suspected terrorists, who may be in the planning stages of terror attacks against United States nationals at home and abroad. The first such list profiled five persons about whom little was known, but who were suspected of plotting terrorist attacks in martyrdom operations. The main evidence against the five was five videos they had produced, found in the rubble of Mohammed Atef's destroyed home outside Kabul, Afghanistan.

== Additions to the list ==
By 2006, more than four years had passed since the FBI had listed the original 22 alleged terrorists on the Most Wanted Terrorist list. Of those 22, by then four had been qualified for removal from the list, due to death or capture. Also by then, the FBI determined that other people qualified for the list. Some were indicted for attacks and plots that had taken place since the original list had been compiled. The original indictments had been for incidents only through 1998. The US had been victim to at least two significant terror attacks, which had generated new indictments, notably:

- USS Cole bombing in 2000, which killed 17 American sailors and wounded 40 on October 12, 2000, off the port coast of Aden, Yemen
- September 11, 2001 attacks in Manhattan, Washington, D.C., and Pennsylvania

In addition, after the original 2001 list had been compiled and released to the public, the US had foiled and issued indictments for numerous other plots, involving some new listed Most Wanted Terrorists. Those notable other plots involved:

- The Lackawanna Six, a Buffalo, New York cell that was exposed September 2002
- Palestinian Islamic Jihad, on Racketeer Influenced and Corrupt Organizations Act (RICO) charges for plots based from Syria since 1995
- Abu Sayyaf kidnappings and murders of foreign nationals in the Philippines

In February 2006, the FBI completed two groups of additions to the Most Wanted Terrorists list, the first additions in over four years. On February 24, 2006, the day after adding two names to the list, the FBI added an additional six fugitive terrorists, for various plots and attacks. One of the entries was for an indictment dating back to the June 14, 1985, hijacking of TWA flight 847 by Hezbollah (see above).

Additionally, the FBI also added to the Seeking Information – War on Terrorism list an additional three people, most notably, Abu Musab al-Zarqawi, the leader of Al-Qaeda in Iraq. This marked the first time that al-Zarqawi had appeared on any of the three major FBI wanted lists. On June 8, 2006, ABC News reported that Abu Musab al-Zarqawi was confirmed to have been killed in Baghdad in a bombing raid by a United States task force. His death was confirmed by multiple sources in Iraq, including the United States government.

Photo	Name	Alleged terrorist activity	Date of activity	Date added to list	Status
	Jamal Ahmad Mohammad Al Badawi	USS Cole bombing	October 12, 2000	February 23, 2006	Killed
Rewards for Justice offered $5 million for information leading to his capture or conviction. He was killed in a drone strike on January 1, 2019, in Ma'rib Governorate, Yemen.
	Jaber A. Elbaneh	Buffalo Six	Sometime in 2002	February 23, 2006	At large
Surrendered to Yemeni authorities on May 20, 2007. However, after serving a 5-year sentence there, he was not given into US custody and is still wanted by the FBI.
	Mohammed Ali Hamadei	TWA Flight 847	June 14, 1985	February 24, 2006	Killed
Arrested by West German police on January 13, 1987, and released on December 15, 2005. Rewards for Justice was offering $5 million for information leading to his capture or conviction. He was killed outside his home in Lebanon by unknown gunmen on 21 January 2025.
	Ramadan Abdullah Mohammad Shallah	Palestinian Islamic Jihad, on RICO	Since 1995	February 24, 2006	Deceased
Wanted for conspiracy to conduct the affairs of the designated international terrorist organization known as the "Palestinian Islamic Jihad". Shalah died on June 6, 2020, in Lebanon after a long illness.
Abd Al Aziz Awda	Abd Al Aziz Awda	Palestinian Islamic Jihad, on RICO	Since 1995	February 24, 2006	At large
Abd Al Aziz Awda	Co-founder of the PIJ.				
	Khadafi Abubakar Janjalani	Abu Sayyaf kidnaps and murders in the Philippines	Early 1990s – 2000s (decade)	February 24, 2006	Killed
Died of gunshot wounds on September 4, 2006. Philippine marines found the remains of his body on December 27, 2006. Death was confirmed by DNA testing on January 20, 2007. Listed as deceased as of January 22, 2007. Removed from list as of February 21.
	Jainal Antel Sali	Abu Sayyaf kidnaps & murders in the Philippines	Early 1990s – 2000s (decade)	February 24, 2006	Killed
Killed by Philippines special forces on January 16, 2007.
	Isnilon Totoni Hapilon	Abu Sayyaf kidnaps & murders in the Philippines	Early 1990s – 2000s (decade)	February 24, 2006	Killed
Killed by the Philippine Army on October 16, 2017.
Adam Yahiye Gadahn	Adam Yahiye Gadahn	Treason	2003–2015	October 11, 2006	Killed
Adam Yahiye Gadahn	Gadahn was removed by the FBI from the Seeking Information – War on Terrorism list on October 11, 2006, and placed instead on the FBI Most Wanted Terrorists list. Also, on October 11, 2006, Gadahn was indicted on a treason charge by a federal grand jury in Santa Ana, California making him the first American charged with treason since 1952. Rewards for Justice offered $1 million for information leading to his capture. He was killed in a drone strike in Pakistan on January 19, 2015.				
	Daniel Andreas San Diego	Chiron and Shaklee bombings	August 28, 2003; September 26, 2003	April 11, 2009	Captured
San Diego was added to the FBI Most Wanted Terrorists list in connection with two Animal Liberation Brigade bombings in Northern California in 2003. He is the second United States citizen, and the first domestic terrorist, to appear on the list. He was captured in Wales, UK on November 25, 2024. He is currently facing extradition.
	Fahd al-Quso	USS Cole bombing	October 12, 2000	November 2, 2009	Killed
Sought for his role in the October 2000 bombing of the USS Cole in Yemen, in which 17 American sailors were killed. Rewards for Justice offered $5 million for information leading to his capture or conviction He was killed in a drone strike in Yemen on May 6, 2012.
	Husayn Muhammed al-Umari	Pan Am Flight 830	August 11, 1982	November 2, 2009	At large
Also known as Abu Ibrahim, is wanted in connection with the 1982 bombing of Pan Am Flight 830.
	Wadoud Muhammad Hafiz Al-Turki	Pan Am Flight 73	September 5, 1986	December 3, 2009	At large
Wanted for his role in the hijacking of Pan American World Airways Flight 73. Convicted in Pakistan in 1988, but allegedly deported to Palestine in 2009.
keft	Jamal Saeed Abdul Rahim	Pan Am Flight 73	September 5, 1986	December 3, 2009	At large
keft	Wanted for his role in the hijacking of Pan American World Airways Flight 73. Convicted in Pakistan in 1988, but allegedly deported to Palestine in 2009. Pakistani officials claimed that he was killed on January 9, 2010, by a U.S. airstrike, but the reports have never been confirmed and he is still on the list.				
	Muhammad Abdullah Khalil Hussain Ar-Rahayyal	Pan Am Flight 73	September 5, 1986	December 3, 2009	At large
Wanted for his role in the hijacking of Pan American World Airways Flight 73. Convicted in Pakistan in 1988, but allegedly deported to Palestine in 2009.
	Muhammad Ahmed Al-Munawar	Pan Am Flight 73	September 5, 1986	December 3, 2009	At large
Wanted for his role in the hijacking of Pan American World Airways Flight 73. Convicted in Pakistan in 1988, but allegedly deported to Palestine in 2009.
Adnan G. El Shukrijumah	Adnan Gulshair el Shukrijumah	2009 New York City Subway and United Kingdom plot	September 2009	July 8, 2010	Killed
Adnan G. El Shukrijumah	Wanted for his alleged role in the plot against New York City's subway system, uncovered in September 2009. He was killed in a manhunt operation by Pakistan Army in South Waziristan on December 6, 2014.				
	Abu Mansoor Al-Amriki (born Omar Shafik Hammami)	Membership in al-Shabaab	November 2006 – June 2013	November 14, 2012	Killed
Joined al-Shabaab in 2006 and became one of its top leaders. After splitting from the organization in June 2013, he was killed by its militants on September 12 of that year.
Radullan Sahiron	Radullan Sahiron	Kidnapping for Abu Sayyaf	November 14, 1993	November 14, 2012	At large
Radullan Sahiron	Alleged leader of Abu Sayyaf since 2005. Wanted for a particular kidnapping in 1993, but believed to be responsible for other abductions.				
Assata Shakur	Assata Shakur (née JoAnne Deborah Byron, married name JoAnne Chesimard)	Murder of Trooper Werner Foerster	May 2, 1973	May 2, 2013	Deceased
Assata Shakur	Former Black Liberation Army member openly living in Cuba after she escaped from a New Jersey prison in 1979. Two million dollar reward offered. Shakur died in Havana on September 25, 2025, following health problems.				
Ahmad Abousamra	Ahmad Abousamra	Attempting to obtain terrorist training	2002–2004	December 18, 2013	Killed
Ahmad Abousamra	Wanted for travelling to Pakistan and Yemen between 2002 and 2004 in order to receive terrorist training. Killed by an airstrike in Syria in January 2017.				
	Liban Haji Mohamed	Recruitment for al-Shabaab	Since July 5, 2012	January 29, 2015	At large
Alleged to have departed the U.S. on July 5, 2012, to join al-Shabaab, and to have acted as a recruiter for the organization. Detained by Somali authorities on March 2, 2015, but is still on the list.
Ahlam Tamimi	Ahlam Tamimi	Sbarro restaurant suicide bombing	August 9, 2001	March 14, 2017	At large
Ahlam Tamimi	Arrested and imprisoned in Israel, but freed as part of the 2011 Gilad Shalit prisoner exchange.				
Sajid Mir	Sajid Mir	2008 Mumbai attacks	November 26, 2008 – November 29, 2008	March 22, 2019	At large
Sajid Mir	Arrested by Pakistani authorities on April 21, 2022, then convicted and sentenced to fifteen-and-a-half years in prison on May 16 of that year. He was not extradited and remains on the list as of February 2023.				

== Rewards ==
Since 1984, the United States government has also used the Rewards for Justice Program, which pays monetary rewards of up to $25 million, or now, in some cases more, upon special authorization by the United States Secretary of State, to individuals who provide information which substantially leads to countering of terrorist attacks against United States persons. More than $100 million had been paid to over 60 people through this program.

The Rewards for Justice Program was established by the 1984 Act to Combat International Terrorism, Public Law 98-533, and is administered by the Bureau of Diplomatic Security, within the U.S. Department of State.

== See also ==
- FBI Ten Most Wanted Fugitives
- Terrorist incidents
- War on terror
- Weapons of mass destruction
