= Ahmed Ibrahim Al-Mughassil =

Saudi Arabian terrorist

- أحمد إبراهيم المغسل
- Ahmad Al-Mughassil
- Born: June 26, 1967 (age 59); Qatif, Saudi Arabia
- Other names: Ahmad Ibrahim Al-Mughassil; Abu Omran; Arfad
- Organization: Saudi Hizballah
- Known for: Head of the military wing of the pro-Iran Saudi Hizballah
- Height: 5 ft 4 in (163 cm)
- Criminal charges: 46 separate criminal counts including murder
- Wanted by: FBI

Details
- Locations: Khobar Towers complex near Dhahran, Saudi Arabia

Ahmed Ibrahim Al-Mughassil (Note: Also spelled Ahmad Ibrahim Al-Mughassil) (Arabic: أحمد إبراهيم المغسل; born June 26, 1967) is wanted by the United States government in connection with the June 25, 1996, attack on the Khobar Towers complex near Dhahran, Saudi Arabia. He was indicted in the United States District Court for the Eastern District of Virginia and charged June 21, 2001, with 46 separate criminal counts including murder for having driven the truck bomb that blew up Khobar Towers.

Al-Mughassil is also known as Abu Omran and Arfad. He has been identified as head of the military wing of the pro-Iran Saudi Hizballah, or Hizballah Al-Hijaz, meaning Party of God. The group is one of a number of related Hizballah organizations operating in Saudi Arabia, Lebanon, Kuwait and Bahrain, among other places, and was outlawed in Saudi Arabia.

== Khobar Towers plot, 1993–1996 ==
The indictment traces the carefully organized 1996 bomb plot back to on or about 1993 when Al-Mughassil began to carefully review his cell members' surveillance reports of Americans in Saudi Arabia.

In 1994, the cell determined Khobar Towers to be an important American military location and began an effort in the region to locate a storage site for explosives.

In 1995, an Iranian military officer directed the cell's surveillance on the Red Sea coast of Saudi Arabia for sites of possible future attacks against Americans, and the indictment alleges that Iranian officials enjoyed close ties and provided financial support to Al-Mughassil's party.

About June 1995, regular surveillance of Khobar Towers began, at the direction of Al-Mughassil. By late fall 1995, Al-Mughassil had decided that Hizballah would attack Khobar Towers with a tanker truck loaded with explosives. In early 1996, Al-Mughassil began to hide explosives around the Khobar area.

In early June 1996, according to the indictment, a tanker truck was purchased by the conspirators, who then spent two weeks converting the truck into a truck bomb. The cell finalized plans on the evening of June 25, 1996, for the attack that night.

The attackers used a Datsun van to signal that all was clear to carried out the bombing by blinking its lights. Then the bomb truck, driven by Al-Mughassil and with Ali Saed Bin Ali El-Hoorie as a passenger, entered the lot and backed up against a fence in front of building. Al-Mughassil and El-Hoorie exited the truck after parking it, and entered the back seat of a Chevrolet Caprice car for the getaway, driving away followed by the Datsun. In minutes, a massive explosion sheared the north face off of Building 131. 19 American servicemen were killed, and 372 were wounded.

Although rooftop sentries were immediately suspicious of the truck—parked some 80 feet from the building—and attempted an evacuation, few escaped. Comparable to 20,000 pounds of TNT, the bomb was estimated to be larger than the one that destroyed the federal building in Oklahoma City a year before, and more than twice as powerful as the 1983 bomb used at the Marine barracks in Beirut.

== Fugitive trail ==
Immediately following the attack, the leaders fled the Khobar area and Saudi Arabia using fake passports.

In 2001, al-Mughassil was eventually indicted along with his co-conspirators for the 1996 Khobar Towers attack. Still a U.S. fugitive months later, he then became one of four of the indicted men from the 1996 Khobar Towers attack who were named on the initial list of the FBI's top 22 Most Wanted Terrorists, which was released to the public by former President George W. Bush on October 10, 2001.

Al-Mughassil was believed to be living in Iran. In 2025, Iranian president Hassan Rouhani admitted to sheltering an individual whom two Iranian former security officials identified as al-Mughassil. According to Rouhani, the Iranian state had sheltered this individual for 19 years, and had sent him to Lebanon in August 2015 to inflame relations between Lebanon and Saudi Arabia.

On August 26, 2015, the Saudi-owned newspaper Asharq al-Awsat reported that al-Mughassil had been captured in Beirut and transferred to Riyadh, Saudi Arabia.

== Personal life ==
In November 2024, Al-Mughassil's son, Omran, was killed by an Israeli airstrike in Lebanon during the Israel–Hezbollah conflict.
