= Hani al-Sayegh =

Saudi citizen and alleged member of Hezbollah Al-Heja

- Born: Saudi Arabia
- Arrested: 1997; Canada; Grocery store
- Citizenship: Saudi
- Detained at: black sites
- Charge: extrajudicial detention

Hani Abdel Rahim Hussein al-Sayegh (Arabic: هاني عبد الرحيم الصائغ) is a Saudi citizen, and alleged member of Hezbollah Al-Hejaz and accused of involvement in the 1996 Khobar Towers bombing. He was one of 14 people subjected to extraordinary rendition by the CIA prior to the 2001 declaration of a war on terror.

Although he appeared to be innocent, American officials released a falsified account of his interrogations and deported him back to Saudi Arabia, where it was presumed he faced beheading. Despite the lack of evidence against him, Hani Al-Sayegh was one of the individuals named later in an indictment issued by the US Justice Department.

== Life ==
As a young man, al-Sayegh had joined the Islamic Revolutionary Guard Corps, but following a "particularly disastrous exercise" where his asthma interfered, he was told to leave the corps.

He left Saudi Arabia in August 1995, and moved to Iran where he studied, and then Kuwait.

In August 1996, after traveling through Rome and Boston, al-Sayegh arrived in Canada where he applied for refugee and permanent resident status, while living in Ottawa. He claimed to belong to a minority Shi'ite group in Saudi Arabia, where he claimed he and his brother Mohamed had both been tortured by the officials.

== Arrest ==
The 28-year-old al-Sayegh was arrested in a grocery store in March 1997, and hired immigration lawyer Douglas M. Baum to defend himself.

Canada accused him of driving one of two vehicles which had accompanied the Khobar car bomb, and had waved the bomber forward to indicate the parking lot was safe to enter, and sought to deport him. However, since al-Sayegh was a "frail" man suffering from frequent attacks of asthma, the accusation that he had been a getaway driver was criticised. The evidence against him was based largely on a meeting, believed to have occurred two years before the bombing, between Sayegh and Ahmad Sherifi, a senior Iranian intelligence officer also accused.

al-Sayegh argued that he had been studying in Iran for four years, including during the time the bombing took place, and that his phone call to the Iranian embassy on the day of the attacks was simply to help a friend obtain a visa.

The United States stated that despite early excitement, it did not appear to have enough evidence to extradite al-Sayegh. They also criticised Canada, stating that the arrest actually foiled surveillance efforts that would have been more fruitful. Canada issued a security certificate to deport al-Sayegh, but sent him to the United States rather than Saudi Arabia, since Attorney General Janet Reno had granted an exception allowing him into the country for the sole sake of prosecution. However, he expressed confusion at the transfer, upon arrival, claiming to know nothing about Khobar and not understanding why the Americans sought him.

In June, al-Sayegh agreed to a plea bargain whereby he would plead guilty to an unrelated incident, after confessing he had suggested bombing an AWACS plane that had been transferred to the Saudi air force. However, he backed out of the agreement the following month, and the United States moved to drop all charges against him. Nevertheless, after being moved from Canada into the United States, he was deported back to Saudi Arabia on October 10, 1999 where it was assumed he would be executed upon arrival.

In Saudi Arabia, he was held incommunicado at Al-Ha'ir Prison for ten days, before his wife and children were allowed to visit him in prison.

In June 2001, the US Department of Justice issued an indictment accusing several alleged members of the Hezbollah for involvement in the Khobar Towers bombing which included the name of Hani Al-Sayegh, despite the fact that charges against him had been dropped and he had been returned to Saudi Arabia.
