= Khobar Towers bombing =

1996 terrorist attack in Khobar, Saudi Arabia

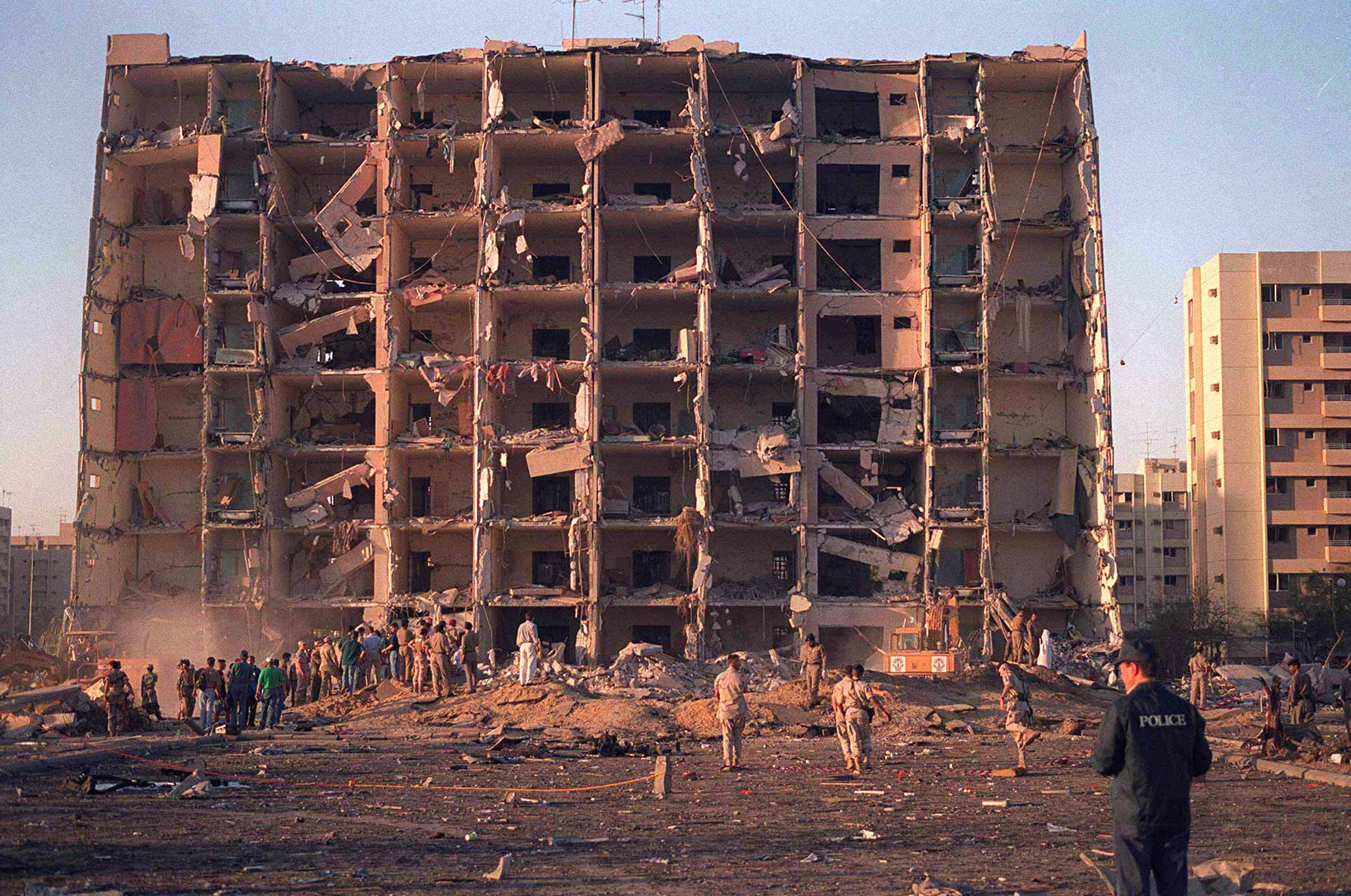
- Building #131 after the bombing.
- Location: 26.261355°N 50.205507°E; Khobar, Saudi Arabia
- Date: 25 June 1996; 30 years ago 9:50 p.m. (UTC+3)
- Attack type: Truck bomb
- Deaths: 19
- Injuries: 498
- Perpetrator: Hezbollah Al-Hejaz / Al-Qaeda (disputed)

The Khobar Towers bombing was a 25 June 1996 attack on part of a housing complex in the city of Khobar, Saudi Arabia, near the national oil company (Saudi Aramco) headquarters of Dhahran and nearby King Abdulaziz Air Base.

At that time, Khobar Towers was being used as living quarters for coalition forces who were assigned to Operation Southern Watch, a no-fly zone operation in southern Iraq, as part of the Iraqi no-fly zones.

A truck bomb was detonated adjacent to Building #131, an eight-story building housing members of the United States Air Force's 4404th Wing (Provisional), primarily from a deployed rescue squadron and deployed fighter squadron.

In all, 19 U.S. Air Force personnel were killed and 498 of many nationalities were wounded. The official 25 June 1996, statement by the United States named members of Hezbollah Al-Hejaz (English: 'Party of God in the Hijaz') as responsible.

== The attack ==
On 13 November 1995, a car bombing in Al Olaya, Riyadh outside the headquarters of the OPM-SANG killed six Americans and two Indian citizens and injured about 70 others. This attack led the U.S. forces stationed at Khobar Towers to raise the threat condition to THREATCON DELTA. Days after this car bombing, military commanders briefed soldiers and airmen at Khobar that the U.S. had received anonymous communications from an organization claiming to have carried out the Riyadh attack. The attackers claimed their goal was to get the United States Armed Forces to leave the country, and that Khobar Towers would be attacked next if troop withdrawal did not begin immediately. It was at this time that surveillance and other suspicious activity near the perimeter fences of Khobar Towers was noted by United States Air Force Security Forces; however, the forces were forbidden by the Saudi government to act in any capacity outside the perimeter of the compound, and the surveillance continued with near impunity.

The attackers were reported to have smuggled explosives into Saudi Arabia from Lebanon. Al-Mughassil, Al-Houri, Al-Sayegh, Al-Qassab, and the unidentified Lebanese man bought a large latrine service tanker truck in early June 1996 in Saudi Arabia. Over a two-week period they converted it into a truck bomb. The group now had about 5,000 pounds (2,300 kg) of plastic explosives, enough to produce a shaped charge that detonated with the force of at least 20,000 pounds (9,100 kg) of TNT, according to a later assessment of the Defense Special Weapons Agency. The power of the blast was magnified several ways. The truck itself shaped the charge by directing the blast toward the building. Moreover, the relatively high clearance between the truck and the ground gave it the more lethal characteristics of an air burst.

It was originally estimated by U.S. authorities to have contained 3,000 to 5,000 pounds (1,400 to 2,300 kg) of explosives. Later the General Downing report on the incident suggested that the explosion contained the equivalent of 20,000 to 30,000 pounds (9,100 to 13,600 kg) of TNT. The attackers prepared for the attack by hiding large amounts of explosive materials and timing devices in paint cans and 50-kilogram (110 lb) bags underground in Qatif, a city near Khobar. The bomb was a mixture of petrol and explosive powder placed in the tank of a sewage tanker truck.

Initially, the attackers attempted to enter the compound at the main checkpoint. When they were denied access by U.S. military personnel, at around 9:43 p.m. local time, they drove a Datsun scout vehicle, another car and the bomb truck, to a parking lot adjacent to building #131. A chain link security fence and a line of small trees separated the car park, used for a local mosque and park, from the housing compound. The perimeter of Building #131 was approximately 72 feet (22 m) from the fence line, with a perimeter road between the fence and building which was often used by military personnel for jogging. The first car entered the car park and signaled the others by flashing headlights. The bomb truck and a getaway vehicle followed shortly after. The men parked the truck next to the fence and left in the third vehicle. The bomb exploded three to four minutes later at approximately 10:20 p.m. local time. The blast was so powerful that it was felt 20 miles (32 km) away in the Persian Gulf state of Bahrain.

A U.S. Air Force security policeman, Staff Sergeant Alfredo R. Guerrero, was stationed atop Building #131 when he witnessed the men, recognized the vehicles as a threat, reported it to security, and began a floor-by-floor evacuation of the building. His actions are credited with saving dozens of lives. Many of the evacuees were in the stairwell when the bomb went off. The stairwell was constructed of heavy marble and was located on the side of the building away from the truck bomb, perhaps the safest location in the building. For his actions, Guerrero was awarded the Airman's Medal.

Another security measure is thought to have minimized damage; along the security fence were Jersey barriers, concrete barriers commonly used along roadways. These deflected the blast energy upward, and away from the lower floors of the building, perhaps even preventing a total collapse of the structure.

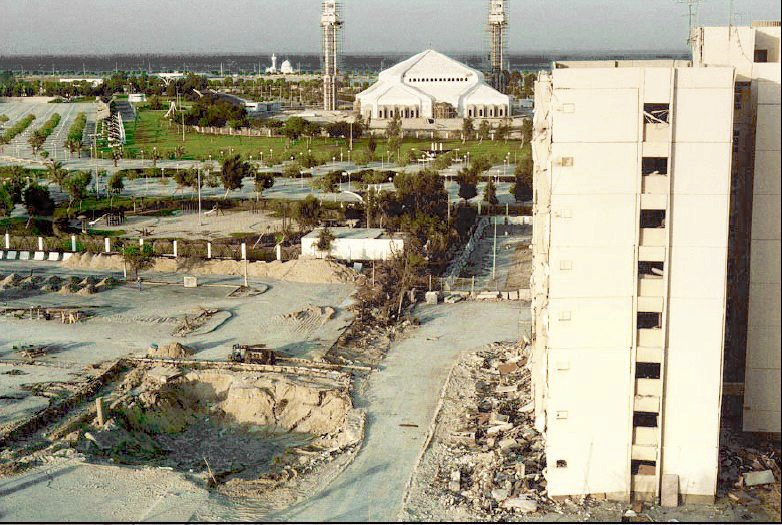
The crater remaining after the truck bomb explosion. Building #131 is on the right.

The force of the explosion was enormous. The size of the explosion created an intense dust storm as the forces of the high pressure blast wave and the subsequent vacuum forces caused considerable damage in their own right. Several military vehicles parked to the left side of building #131 suffered no direct impact from debris, but were heavily damaged by the sheer intensity of the shock wave.

The explosion heavily damaged or destroyed six high rise apartment buildings in the complex. Windows were shattered in virtually every other building in the compound and in surrounding buildings up to a mile (1.6 km) away. A very large crater, 85 feet (26 m) wide and 35 feet (11 m) deep, was left where the truck had been. Within a few hours of the blast, the crater began to fill with salt-water from the Persian Gulf. In the minutes following the blast, the residents of the complex evacuated severely injured U.S. military personnel from the area. With power out in many of the buildings near #131, the scene was chaotic and tense as little was known about the safety of the area from further attacks. Many residents later gathered in the local dining facility, set up as a triage center, and saw breaking news of the event on large projection televisions intended to bring news of events back home to the troops.

== Victims ==
In all, 19 U.S. Air Force personnel were killed:

- Captain Christopher Adams
- Captain Leland Haun
- Master Sergeant Michael G. Heiser
- Master Sergeant Kendall K. Kitson
- Technical Sergeant Daniel B. Cafourek
- Technical Sergeant Patrick P. Fennig
- Technical Sergeant Thanh V. Nguyen
- Staff Sergeant Ronald King
- Staff Sergeant Kevin Johnson
- Sergeant Millard D. Campbell
- Senior Airman Earl F. Cartrette Jr.
- Senior Airman Jeremy A. Taylor
- Airman 1st Class Christopher Lester
- Airman 1st Class Brent E. Marthaler
- Airman 1st Class Brian W. McVeigh
- Airman 1st Class Peter W. Morgera
- Airman 1st Class Joseph E. Rimkus
- Airman 1st Class Justin Wood
- Airman 1st Class Joshua E. Woody

== Aftermath ==
=== Investigation ===
After the blast, an assessment crew consisting of the Central Intelligence Agency (CIA), Federal Bureau of Investigation (FBI), Diplomatic Security Service (DSS), and United States Air Force Office of Special Investigations (AFOSI) was sent to assess the risk to other security compounds in Saudi Arabia, and to offer suggestions for the Khobar Towers complex. It was suggested that Mylar tape be used to coat the windows for a barrier, but the cost, about US$4.5 million, was considered prohibitive. It was also suggested that the perimeter be expanded to at least 500 feet to protect servicemen from flying glass.

==== Intelligence and security failures ====
After the bombing of Khobar Towers, the U.S. military and intelligence community came under heavy criticism for their lack of preparation and foresight for what was considered an intelligence failure. According to the New York Times, "significant shortcomings in planning, intelligence, and basic security left American forces in Saudi Arabia vulnerable."

Numerous warnings had been made available to the intelligence community and military command, and up to "ten incidents [were] reported suggesting that the Khobar Towers are under surveillance" from April to June 1996. These warnings came both before and after the beheadings of four Saudi nationals after their publicly confessed role in the November 1995 attacks in Riyadh. Clinton Administration officials admit that they "received a wave of threats against Americans and American installations in Saudi Arabia" in the weeks leading up to the attack, "but failed to prepare adequately for a bomb of the power that killed 19 American military personnel." Threats were also downplayed by the Saudis when Defense Minister Prince Sultan bin Abd al-Aziz al-Saud characterized acts carried out by Saudi Islamic jihadists in 1995 as "boyish", and stated that the Saudi "Kingdom is not influenced by threats". Senator Arlen Specter (R-PA) commented during a Senate intelligence committee meeting by saying "there was no intelligence failure ... there had been more than 100 intelligence reports on alerts of a general nature, and very specific reports" of an extant and present threat to the Khobar Towers complex.

The CIA was blamed for misjudging the bomb-making capabilities of Saudi militants, arbitrarily deciding that no bomb could exceed the size of that used in the November 1995 bombings in Riyadh (200 lbs). According to official U.S. government estimates, the Khobar bomb weighed in at approximately 5,000 pounds. American commanders were also blamed, as they had not taken every precaution advised by the Pentagon; specifically, because "the project was deemed too costly", they had failed to implement a recommendation to coat Khobar's windows with plastic to prevent flying glass.

The main security concern at the Khobar Towers compound before the bombing had been the prevention of an attack similar to the 1983 Beirut barracks bombings, when a vehicle-bomb entered the compound itself. Yet the Pentagon's report from that incident suggested, as did the Khobar report, that a Beirut-sized bomb would still have caused significant damage from as far as 300 feet away. Officials concluded with the observation that bomb size was less important to the production of catastrophic results than that same bomb's effective proximity (blast radius).

=== Operational relocation ===
As a result of the terrorist attack, U.S. and coalition military operations at Khobar and Dhahran were subsequently relocated to Prince Sultan Air Base, a remote and highly secure Royal Saudi Air Force installation near Al-Kharj in central Saudi Arabia, approximately 70 miles from Riyadh. American, British, and French military operations would continue at Prince Sultan until late-2003, when French forces withdrew and American and British operations shifted to Al Udeid Air Base in Qatar.

== Culpability ==
=== Initial blame ===
The bombing of Khobar Towers, according to the Saudi government, was carried out by "Saudi Islamic militants, including many veterans of the Afghan War." One U.S. official claimed that "it now seems it was not an isolated case. There is an organization of violent opponents whose members are loosely connected, organized in semi-independent cells like other violent fundamentalist movements in the Arab World."

=== Indictment ===
In April 1997, the Chairman of the Joint Chiefs of Staff, Gen. John Shalikashvili, said that the Pentagon did not have sufficient evidence about the bombers to consider retaliation against foreign countries that may have played a role.

In June 2001, an indictment was issued in United States District Court for the Eastern District of Virginia in Alexandria, Virginia charging the following people with murder, conspiracy, and other charges related to the bombing:

- Ahmed Ibrahim Al-Mughassil
- Hani al-Sayegh who had been previously in U.S. custody but deported to Saudi Arabia, when charges against him were dropped due to a lack of evidence.
- Ali al-Houri
- Ibrahim Salih Mohammed Al-Yacoub (Arabic: إبراهيم صالح محمد اليعقوب) (born October 16, 1966; in Qatif, Saudi Arabia) wanted by the United States government in connection with the bombing. He was indicted by a Federal Grand Jury in the United States District Court for the Eastern District of Virginia on June 21, 2001 on 46 separate criminal counts including murder for his role in the attack. Months after his 2001 indictment in the 1996 attack, Al-Yacoub, then still a U.S. fugitive, was placed on the initial list of the FBI's top 22 Most Wanted Terrorists, which was released to the public by President Bush on October 10, 2001. Al Yacoub is alleged to be a member of the pro-Iran Saudi Hezbollah, or Hezbollah Al-Hijaz. A reward of up to $5 million is being offered by the Rewards for Justice Program for information leading directly to the apprehension or conviction of Ibrahim Salih Mohammed Al-Yacoub. The 2001 indictment traces the carefully organized 1996 bomb plot back to on or about 1993 when Al-Yacoub was part of a team instructed by Al Mughassil to begin surveillance of Americans in Saudi Arabia, including at the location of Khobar Towers as early as 1994. Al-Yacoub is also said to have worked as a liaison between his organisation and the Lebanese and Iranian branches of Hezbollah, especially information transfer.
- Abdel Karim al-Nasser
- Mustafa al-Qassab
- Sa’ed al-Bahar
- Abdallah al-Jarash
- Hussein al-Mughis
- Ali al-Marhoun
- Saleh Ramadan
- Mustafa al-Mu’alem
- Fadel al-Alawe
- John Doe (described as a Lebanese)

In July 2001, Saudi Arabia said that eleven of the people indicted in the US were in custody in Saudi prisons, and were to be tried in Saudi court, as the country refused to extradite any of them to the United States to stand trial. The government has not since made public the outcome of the trial or the whereabouts of the prisoners.

In August 2015, Arab newspaper Asharq Al-Awsat reported that Ahmed Ibrahim Al-Mughassil, a leader of the gulf shia group Hezbollah Al-Hejaz found to be responsible for the bombing, had been arrested in Beirut and transferred to Saudi Arabian custody; an anonymous American intelligence officer told The New York Times that the Saudi government had not confirmed the arrest, but U.S. intelligence believed the report was accurate.

=== Attribution to al-Qaeda ===
Abdel Bari Atwan who interviewed Bin Laden in 1996 after the bombings wrote:

In May 1996 Bin Laden and his entourage moved from Sudan to Afghanistan. As if to make the point that they might have been chased out of Sudan by Saudi Arabia and the US they were not leaving with their tails between their legs, al Qaeda struck again: The June bombing of Khobar Towers. The Saudi authorities were at pains to implicate Shi'i militants backed by Iran in this attack, since the embarrassing truth that they had their very own homegrown militancy problem was inadmissible; they did not want to give the impression that there was domestic opposition to the deployment of US troops on Saudi soil.

Later in the book, he writes, "Bin Laden also confirmed that al Qaeda was behind the June 1996 bombing of the American base at Khobar Towers in Dharan, Saudi Arabia. A massive 1,500 kg of dynamite exploded in the military complex housing American forces; nineteen soldiers were killed and 500 people injured. Bin Laden said he was upset that the US had subsequently relocated its Saudi military base to al-Kharj, in the desert south of Riyadh. 'It's a much more remote place, he complained. In Khobar it was easy to catch them ... and they moved so quickly. They did it in under a month.' He said that al Qaeda had had other operations planned for the Khobar Towers compound."

In August 1996, Osama Bin Laden issued a fatwa which was first published in Quds Al Arabi, a London-based newspaper, warning the United States against keeping troops in Saudi Arabia. The fatwa was entitled "Declaration of War against the Americans Occupying the Land of the Two Holy Places" and it specifically mentioned the bombing:

"The youths you called cowards are competing among themselves for fighting and killing you. reciting what one of them said: The crusader army became dust when we detonated al-Khobar. With courageous youth of Islam fearing no danger."

In an interview with Robert Fisk ten days after the attack, bin Laden spoke positively about it, saying: "Not long ago, I gave advice to the Americans to withdraw their troops from Saudi Arabia. Now let us give some advice to the governments of Britain and France to take their troops out – because what happened in Riyadh and al-Khobar showed that the people who did this have a deep understanding in choosing their targets. They hit their main enemy, which is the Americans. They killed no secondary enemies, nor their brothers in the army or the police in Saudi Arabia... I give this advice to the government of Britain" and "The explosion in al-Khobar did not come as a direct reaction to the American occupation, but as a result of American behaviour against Muslims, its support of Jews in Palestine and of the massacres of Muslims in Palestine and Lebanon – of Sabra and Chatila and Qana – and of the Sharm el-Sheikh conference."

In 2004, the 9/11 Commission noted that Osama bin Laden was seen being congratulated on the day of the Khobar attack, and stated there were reports in the months preceding the attack that Bin Laden was seeking to facilitate a shipment of explosives to Saudi Arabia. According to the United States, classified evidence suggests that the government of Iran was the key sponsor of the incident, and several high-ranking members of their military may have been involved. A U.S. federal court speculated that the Khobar Towers bombing was authorized by Ali Khamenei, the Supreme Leader of Iran.

William Perry, who was the United States Secretary of Defense at the time that this bombing happened, said in an interview in June 2007 that "he now believes al-Qaida rather than Iran was behind a 1996 truck bombing at an American military base."

On 22 December 2006, high court judge Royce C. Lamberth ruled that Iran and Hezbollah were directly and personally responsible for the attack, stating that the leading experts on Hezbollah presented "overwhelming" evidence of the group's involvement and that six captured Hezbollah agents detailed the role of Iranian intelligence and military officials in providing money, explosives, arms and weapons, plans, and maps. This decision was reached as a default judgment, however, in which the Iranian government was not represented in court, because they chose not to challenge the allegations in a U.S. courtroom.

=== Implications for U.S.–Iran relations ===
Within days of the blast, counterterrorism officials on Clinton’s National Security Council staff concluded that elements inside Iran, specifically the Islamic Revolutionary Guard Corps (IRGC), were the perpetrators. They put pressure on the president and his national security adviser, Sandy Berger, to take action. They were joined by others inside and outside the administration, notably FBI Director Louis J. Freeh and New York Times columnist Thomas Friedman. Before taking action, President Clinton insisted on proof that could stand up in both a court of law and the court of public opinion. In the meantime, he ordered a review of military options in case of a decision to punish Iran.

By the time Saudi Arabia and the FBI concluded their investigations, Iranians had elected a new president, Mohammad Khatami, in May 1997. Khatami surprised the international community by urging a "dialogue of civilizations" with the West in order to overcome almost two decades of animosity and Iranian isolation. Clinton, who had initially taken a stand toward the Islamic Republic, including imposing major economic sanctions on the country, reversed his thinking in the hope that Khatami potentially represented a game-changing shift in Iran's conduct.

The prospect of an opening with Tehran, which intrigued many U.S. allies and even domestic critics of administration policy, drove Clinton's response to the Khobar attack. The White House and State Department sent various signals to the Iranians, some of which they reciprocated, but ultimately hopes for a significant improvement in relations remained unfulfilled.

In June 1999, Clinton authorized what he later called a "Hail Mary," sending a direct message to Khatami. Delivered by Omani Foreign Minister Yousef bin Alawi in July, the letter attempted to achieve multiple purposes: to signal Tehran that Washington was open to a rapprochement but also to make clear that the United States held the IRGC responsible for the bombing. Clinton was under pressure from FBI Director Freeh and other domestic actors to press for accountability for the attack.

The attempt backfired. Although Khatami was reportedly happy with the American initiative, especially because it was accompanied by an oral message of strong personal support from Clinton delivered by the Omani envoy, the Iranian president's colleagues in the leadership, including Supreme Leader Ali Khamenei, reacted vehemently to the text of the letter. Two months later, the Iranians responded with a written denunciation of the allegation of culpability and a refusal to consider boosting bilateral ties under such circumstances.

Beyond the Clinton administration's miscalculation of Iranian politics, the episode showed that the bombing would continue to cast a long shadow over U.S.–Iran relations in years to come.

== See also ==
- Riyadh compound bombings
- List of Islamist terrorist attacks
- 1983 Beirut barracks bombings
- 2004 Khobar massacre
- Terrorism in Saudi Arabia
- Iran and state-sponsored terrorism
- Riyadh compound bombings (2003) – the next major attack, which triggered a second series of terrorist attacks
- The Kingdom – feature film inspired by the attack
- The Siege – a 1998 film that utilizes stock footage from the Khobar Towers bombing to portray a fictitious bombing of an army barracks
