= Fahid Mohammed Ally Msalam =

Kenyan alleged terrorist (1976–2009)

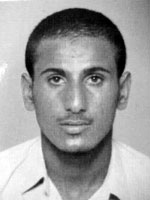
- Born: February 19, 1976; Mombasa, Kenya
- Died: January 1, 2009 (aged 32); Pakistan
- Cause of death: Assassination (drone strike)
- Known for: 1998 United States embassy bombings

Fahid Mohammed Ally Msalam (Arabic: فهد محمد علي مسالم, also known as Usama al-Kini) (February 19, 1976 – January 1, 2009) was a Kenyan terrorist conspirator, wanted in the United States for his part in the 1998 United States embassy bombings in Kenya and Tanzania. He was born in Mombasa.

According to the indictment, Msalam

- with Khalfan Khamis Mohamed, purchased the SUV used by the Tanzania cell
- with Sheikh Ahmed Salim Swedan, purchased the Kenya bomb truck
- helped to load the Tanzania bomb truck
- fled Kenya to Karachi on the same airliner as Mohamed Odeh, on or about the day before the bombings.

Msalam was charged with 213 counts of murder, other counts which apply specifically to attacks against American federal personnel and facilities, counts of using weapons of mass destruction, and various conspiracy counts.

Msalam once worked as a clothing vendor. He also played midfield for a soccer team called the Black Panthers.

Msalam was on the FBI's list of Most Wanted Terrorists since its inception on October 10, 2001. The United States Department of State, through the Rewards for Justice Program, offered up to US$5,000,000 for information on the location of Fahid Mohammed Ally Msalam. He served as al-Qaeda's chief of operations for Pakistan.

On January 1, 2009, Msalam was killed in Pakistan in an American unmanned drone attack along with his lieutenant, Sheikh Ahmed Salim Swedan.
