= 2017 Lebanon–Saudi Arabia dispute =

Political dispute

2017 Lebanon–Saudi Arabia Crisis
- Part of the Arab Winter and Iran–Saudi Arabia proxy conflict
Date	4 November – 5 December 2017
Location	Lebanon; Saudi Arabia
Result	Hariri government pledges compliance with the policy of dissociation from regional conflicts; Resignation of Prime Minister Saad Hariri rescinded

Parties involved in dispute
Lebanon; Supported by: Iran; France; United States; Turkey; Germany; Hezbollah	Saudi Arabia; Supported by: United Arab Emirates; Bahrain; Kuwait; Partial involvement: Jordan

In 2017, Lebanese Prime Minister Saad Hariri abruptly announced his resignation while he was in Saudi Arabia on 4 November 2017. Shortly thereafter, the foreign relations between both countries and allied regional neighbors became increasingly strained. On 6 November, Saudi Arabia claimed Lebanon declared war between the two states, despite leaders of Lebanon stating otherwise. On 9 November, Saudi Arabia, Bahrain, Kuwait, and the United Arab Emirates, asked their citizens to leave. The conflict is thought to be part of the larger Iran–Saudi Arabia proxy conflict.

Lebanon's president and some Lebanese officials believe that Hariri's abrupt resignation was made under coercion by Saudis and have claimed that the Saudis had kept him hostage. Iran, Hezbollah and some analysts also believe that this was to create a pretext for war against Hezbollah. On 21 November, Hariri resigned in Beirut but he immediately suspended it, then he rescinded the resignation completely on 5 December.

== Background ==
In 1989, Saudi Arabia along with the United States helped to mediate the end of the fifteen-year Lebanese Civil War through the Taif Agreement. The agreement left Hezbollah as Lebanon's only armed sectarian militia, due to its struggle against Israeli occupation of Southern Lebanon. Following Israel's withdrawal from Lebanon in 2000, calls grew for the disarmament of Hezbollah; however, the party resisted any such move. Following the assassination of Rafik Hariri—believed to have involved Hezbollah, after Hariri's call for Hezbollah's disarmament—Saudi Arabia called for the immediate withdrawal of the Syrian occupation of Lebanon. Saudi Arabia has opposed Hezbollah's influence in Lebanon and its involvement in the Syrian Civil War, as the group is seen to be strongly aligned with Iran.

== Resignation of Hariri ==
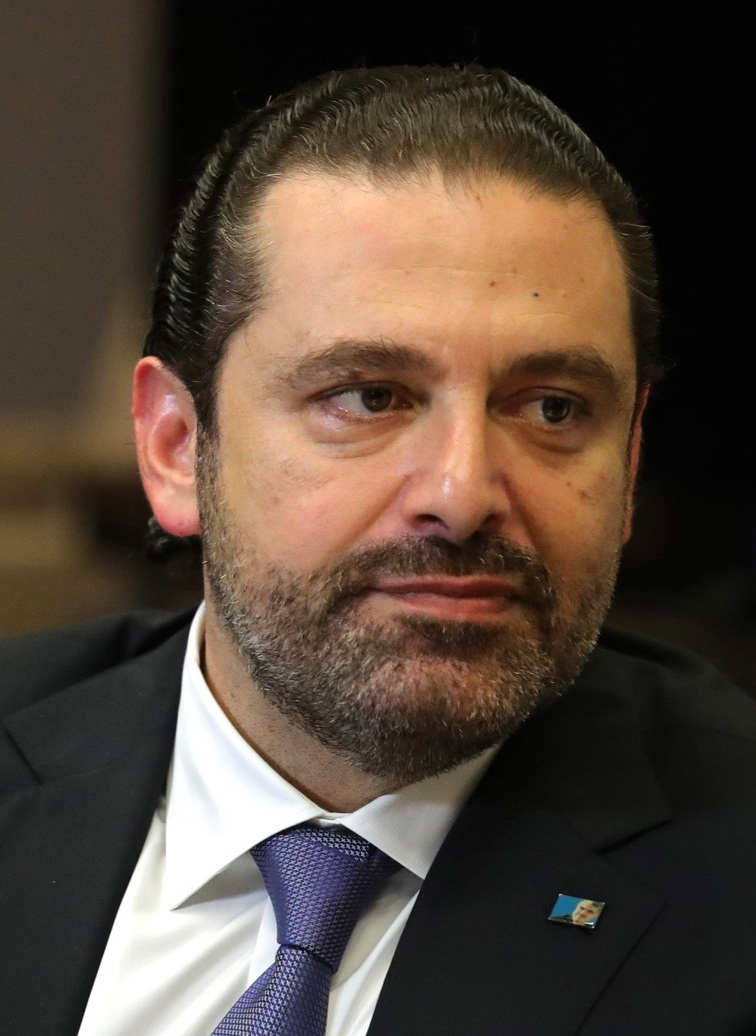
Hariri in 2017

On 4 November 2017, in a televised statement from Saudi Arabia, Lebanese prime minister Saad Hariri tendered his resignation from office, citing Iran's and Hezbollah's political over-extension in the Middle East region and fears of assassination. Hariri's resignation led to a drop in Lebanese bonds and warnings of a cut to its credit rating.

Iran vehemently rejected Saad Hariri's remarks and called his resignation part of a plot by the United States, Israel, and Saudi Arabia to heighten Middle Eastern tensions.

On 21 November, Hariri declared in Beirut that he had suspended his resignation. He stated that President Aoun had asked him to "put it on hold ahead of further consultations." He refused to talk about what happened in Saudi Arabia and claimed that events will remain undisclosed. On 5 December he withdrew his resignation in a speech in which he emphasized Lebanon's neutrality in all regional conflicts.

=== Kidnapping and hostage accusations ===
Upon Hariri's abrupt resignation from Saudi Arabia, Lebanese President Michel Aoun is reported as having told foreign ambassadors that Hariri has been kidnapped by Saudi Arabia. Pointing to his twelve-day stay in Saudi Arabia after his resignation, Aoun said that he considers Hariri to be detained by Saudi Arabia.

According to journalist Robert Fisk, Hariri could not have resigned on his own, as he had already scheduled visits with International Monetary Fund and the World Bank for the following Monday. Moreover, Hariri had also arrived in Saudi Arabia on 4 November wearing casual dress, because he expected to go camping in the desert with Mohammad bin Salman.

Robert Fisk adds that when Hariri's airplane landed in Riyadh's airport, he saw himself surrounded by police forces, who confiscated his cellphone and those of his bodyguards. According to an American official cited by the New Yorker, Hariri was then kept in Saudi custody for eleven hours, put in a chair with Saudi officials repeatedly slapping him. According to The New Yorker, a former American official stated that Hariri said that "Iran intended to continue asserting itself in the region", after meeting with Ali Akbar Velayati, a high-ranking advisor to Iran's Supreme Leader. Hariri also posed smiling for a photo with Velayati. According to The New Yorker report, when Bin Salman heard about the events, "he was enraged", and "[h]e felt like he had to do something".

A senior American official in the Middle-East is quoted as saying that the plot was "the dumbest thing I've ever seen." The entire fiasco was believed to be part of Saudi crown prince Mohammad bin Salman's extreme measures to curb Iran's influence in the region.

Several Iran-leaning and Shia-aligned Lebanese groups, including Hezbollah, accused Saudi Arabia of holding Hariri hostage; Hariri's associates and Saudi officials have denied this. Several Lebanese commentators poked fun at the released pictures of Hariri in Saudi Arabia for their apparent similarity to those taken of hostages. The leader of Lebanon's Hezbollah, Hassan Nasrallah, declared "the resignation of Hariri illegal and invalid." In November, it was announced that Hariri was on his way from Saudi Arabia to the United Arab Emirates. Hariri's own party's media outlet reported that he would then move on to Bahrain and later back to Beirut, but both of these trips were subsequently cancelled and he was sent back to Riyadh. Hariri apparently was forced to stay in the guest house of his family's mansion in Riyadh, from where he gave a media interview, and apparently did not have access to his clothes, as he was photographed leaving in overly large shoes.

== War declaration accusations ==
Parties on both sides of the conflict have asserted that the other side has effectively declared war. On 4 November 2017, Saudi Arabia intercepted a ballistic missile fired from Yemen, possibly targeting the Saudi capital of Riyadh. Saudi Foreign Minister Adel al-Jubeir claimed that the missile was smuggled to Yemen's Houthis through Hezbollah operatives. "We will treat the government of Lebanon as a government declaring a war because of Hezbollah militias," Thamer al-Sabhan, minister of state for Persian Gulf affairs told the Saudi-controlled Al Arabiya network. "Lebanon is kidnapped by the militias of Hezbollah and behind it is Iran."

On 9 November 2017, Hezbollah leader Hassan Nasrallah in turn said that Saudi Arabia had "declared war on Lebanon and Hezbollah."

== Analysis ==
Some analysts have speculated that Hariri's resignation could end Lebanon's sectarian power-sharing system under the Taif Agreement. The timing of Hariri's resignation aligned with the 2017 Saudi Arabian purge, leading some to speculate that it is part of Mohammad bin Salman's plan to consolidate power. It was also seen as a power play by Saudi Arabia to increase its influence in Lebanon and counterbalance Iranian gains in Iraq and Syria. Robert Fisk argued that Hariri's resignation was made under Saudi coercion with the aim of forcing Hezbollah out of the Lebanese parliament and instigating civil war in the country.

A US history professor claims that President Aoun feared a loss of power in May 2018 parliamentary elections to a possible Sunni-Christian coalition that could sideline Hezbollah and its allies.

== International reactions ==
On 9 November 2017, Saudi Arabia and subsequently the United Arab Emirates and Kuwait urged their citizens currently in Lebanon to leave the country immediately. Recently, Saudi Arabia declared that it considers "acts of aggression" committed by Hezbollah as Lebanon 'declaring war on it'.

On 10 November 2017, French President Emmanuel Macron made an unscheduled visit to Saudi Arabia amidst the escalating crisis. France is a close partner of Lebanon. United States Secretary of State Rex Tillerson cautioned against "any party, within or outside Lebanon, using Lebanon as a venue for proxy conflicts or in any manner contributing to instability in that country." American and European officials privately pressed Saudi Arabia to back down from its confrontational stance, which, according to The Economist, was heeded. Spokespeople for the French and German foreign ministries, however, said they did not have reason to believe that Hariri was being kept against his will.

Israeli Intelligence Minister Yisrael Katz called the resignation a "turning point" for the Middle East, saying that "Now is the time to press and isolate Hezbollah, until it will be weakened and eventually disarmed."

Maronite Patriarch Bechara Boutros al-Rahi told the Saudi Crown Prince in Riyadh that he supports the reasons for Hariri's resignation.

On 16 November 2017, French President Macron invited Saad Hariri and his family to France. Hariri left Saudi Arabia for France, before returning to Beirut to officially submit his resignation. The French insist that the offer was not one of exile.

== See also ==
- Lebanon–Saudi Arabia relations
- Iran–Saudi Arabia relations
- Iran–Lebanon relations
- Iran–Saudi Arabia proxy conflict
- Hezbollah foreign relations
- 2017–19 Saudi Arabian purge
- 2017 United States–Saudi Arabia arms deal
- Lebanese people in Saudi Arabia
- Qatar–Saudi Arabia diplomatic conflict
- Qatar diplomatic crisis
