= Liban Haji Mohamed =

Somali al-Shabaab member wanted by the FBI

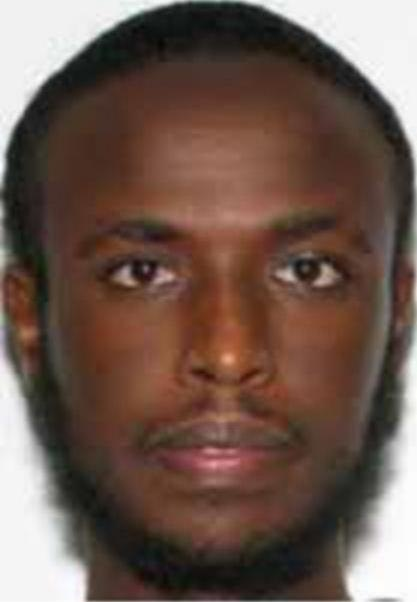
- Photograph of Mohamed
- Born: January 4, 1986 (age 40); Somalia
- Criminal charges: Providing material support for terrorism
- Criminal status: Fugitive

Liban Haji Mohamed is a Somali al-Shabaab member wanted by the Federal Bureau of Investigation.

== Early life ==
Mohamed was born in Somalia, but later moved to Alexandria, Virginia.

== Criminal background ==
Mohamed fled America to Somalia in 2012 to join al-Shabaab, he made a video with al-Shabaab members and attempted to use the propaganda videos to recruit people to join al-Shabaab, he would get caught and indicted after he tried to recruit an undercover FBI agent. This would lead Mohamed to get indicted on providing material support for a terrorism charge in 2020, which later would cause him to be added to the FBI most wanted terrorist list.
