= Ahmed Mohammed Hamed Ali =

Egyptian al-Qaeda member (1965-2010

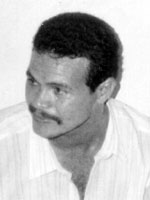
- FBI photo of Ahmed Mohammed Hamed Ali
- Born: c. 1965; Egypt
- Died: 2010 (aged 44–45); Pakistan
- Known for: On the list of FBI Most Wanted Terrorists; 1998 United States embassy bombings

Ahmed Mohammed Hamed Ali (Arabic: أحمد محمّد حامد علي) (c. 1965 – 2010) was an Egyptian national wanted by the United States government in connection with the 1998 United States embassy bombings in Dar es Salaam, Tanzania, and Nairobi.

== Aliases ==
| Shuaib | شعيب |
| Abu Islam al-Surir | أبو إسلام أل-سورير |
| Ahmed the Egyptian | أحمد المصري |
| Ahmed Hemed | أحمد حمد |
| Hamed Ali | حامد علي |
| Ahmed Shieb | أحمد شعب |
| Abu Islam | أبو إسلام |
| Ahmed Mohammed Ali | أحمد محمّد علي |
| Ahmed Hamed | أحمد حامد |
| Ahmed Mohammed Abdurehman | احمد محمّد عبدالرحمن |
| Abu Khadiijah | أبو خديجة |
| Abu Fatima | أبو فاطمة |
| Ahmad al-Masri | حمد ال-مصري |

== Life before the bombings ==
It is thought that, before becoming an accomplice in bombing various American embassies, Ali worked in the field of agriculture, with formal training in the industry. American Homeland Security officials considered Ali an operative of al-Qaeda. Ali had been part of an al Qaeda cell operating in Somalia in the early 1990s that provided training to Somali tribesmen who attacked U.S. forces in that country, according to his indictment. Ali lived in Kenya until fleeing the country on August 2, 1998. He located himself in Karachi, Pakistan until the bombings on August 7, 1998.

== Indicted for the 1998 American embassy bombings ==
Ali was indicted for his suspected role in the 1998 United States embassy bombings by a grand jury in the United States District Court for the Southern District of New York. The United States Government's Rewards for Justice program had offered a 5 million US dollar reward for information directly leading to the capture of Hamed Ali.

On October 10, 2001, he was placed on the initial list of the FBI's top 22 Most Wanted Terrorists. He served as al-Qaeda's chief of paramilitary operations for Afghanistan.

== Death ==
The National Counterterrorism Center reported on February 21, 2011 that Ali was killed in a drone strike in Pakistan in 2010. By May 2012, Ali was no longer listed as a wanted terrorist by either Rewards for Justice or the FBI.
