= Abdelkarim Hussein Mohamed Al-Nasser =

Saudi Arabian terrorist

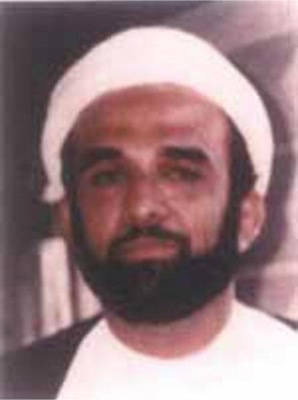
- Abdelkarim Hussein Mohamed Al-Nasser

Abdelkarim Hussein Mohamed Al-Nasser (Arabic: عبد الكريم حسين محمد الناصر) is a Saudi Arabian alleged member and suspected leader of the organization Hezbollah Al-Hijaz, wanted in the United States in connection with the June 25, 1996 Khobar Towers bombing in Dhahran, Saudi Arabia, which killed 19 U.S. Air Force personnel and wounded 498 other people of many nationalities.

== Early life ==
Al-Nasser was born in Al Ihsa, Saudi Arabia and speaks Arabic and Persian.

== Wanted terrorist ==
Al-Nasser has been on the FBI Most Wanted Terrorists list since its inception in 2001. The Rewards for Justice Program is offering up to US$5 million for information leading to the capture of Abdelkarim Al-Nasser. Abdelkarim Hussein Mohamed Al-Nasser has been indicted in the Eastern District of Virginia for the June 25, 1996, bombing of the Khobar Towers military housing complex in Dhahran, Kingdom of Saudi Arabia. Al-Nasser is the alleged leader of the terrorist organization, Saudi Hizballah.

== Personal information ==
Date(s) of Birth Used	Unknown
Place of Birth	Al Ihsa, Saudi Arabia
Hair	Black
Eyes	Brown
Height	5'8"
Weight	170 pounds
Build	Unknown
Complexion	Olive
Sex	Male
Citizenship	Saudi Arabian
Languages	Arabic, Farsi
