= Lebanese people in Saudi Arabia =

Total population
- 100,000 – 250,000'

Regions with significant populations
- Riyadh, Jeddah, Dammam

Languages
- Arabic (Lebanese Arabic), English, French

Religion
- Islam, Christianity and Druze

Lebanese people in Saudi Arabia form one of the largest community of non-citizen Arabs in Saudi Arabia. In addition, an increasing number of Lebanese students seeking education and career opportunities opted for the country in light of its relatively reputable institutions across the Middle East.

The Lebanese people tend to be spread out over various parts of the country, with areas of high concentration being Riyadh, Jeddah, and Dammam.

== Notable people ==
- Al-Waleed bin Talal, Saudi business magnate and investor. He is a member of the Saudi royal family. (Born in Saudi Arabia - Saudi Father/Lebanese Mother - Have a Saudi Arabian citizenship)
- Raif Badawi, Saudi activist, writer and Author. (Born in Khobar, Saudi Arabia to a Saudi Father and a Lebanese Mother)
- Rafic Hariri, Lebanese-Saudi business tycoon and the Prime Minister of Lebanon from 1992 to 1998 and again from 2000 until his resignation on 20 October 2004. (Born in Lebanon - In 1965, Hariri left his home and went to Saudi Arabia - Have a Saudi Arabian citizenship from 1978)
- Saad Hariri, Lebanese citizen who served as the Prime Minister of Lebanon from 2009 until 2011. (Born in Saudi Arabia - his father is the late Lebanese prime minister and politician Rafic Hariri with Saudi citizenship)
- Georges Frem, Lebanese Industrialist and politician who served in various government positions from 1982 to 2003. (Born in Lebanon - He immigrated to Saudi Arabia in 1954, living there temporarily. Where he laid an important contribution to the country's industrialization by establishing NAPCO in 1956. He went on to establish the transnational paper and packaging conglomerate INDEVCO Group)

== See also ==
- Lebanon–Saudi Arabia relations
- List of Lebanese people (Saudi Arabia)
- Lebanese diaspora
- 2017 Lebanon–Saudi Arabia dispute
- Immigration to Saudi Arabia
