= Lebanon–Saudi Arabia relations =

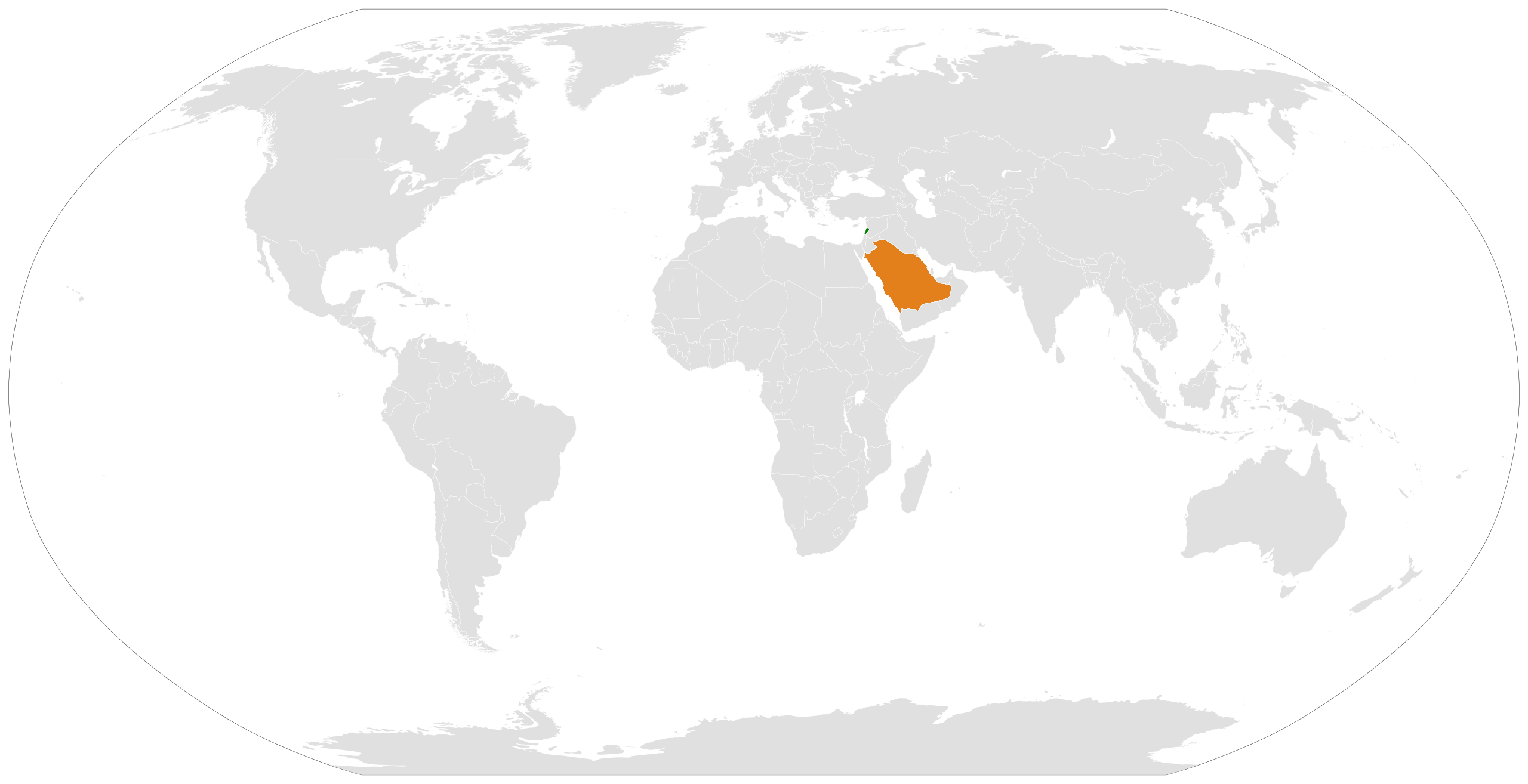
- Lebanon: Saudi Arabia

The diplomatic relations between Lebanon and Saudi Arabia are the relationship between two Arab nations in the Middle East. Lebanon has an embassy in Riyadh and Saudi Arabia has one in Beirut.

== History ==
The modern territory of Saudi Arabia and Lebanon had seen various empires exerting control in the region, the notable ones being the Persian Empire, Roman Empire, Alexander the Great's empire, Arab Caliphates, Seljuk Empire, Mamluk Sultanate and the Ottoman Empire; still, it was the Muslim conquest of the Levant from the Arabs of the Arabian Peninsula that brought Islam and Arabic language to Lebanon, and remains a highly powerful legacy which turned Lebanese people into Arabic-speaking people, although Islam did not become the majority religion of Lebanese people but rather part of a diverse Lebanese society.

=== 20th century ===
Historically, both two were parts of the Ottoman Empire, with Lebanon under a self-government rule while what would be the modern day-Saudi Arabia was under the direct control of the Ottoman Empire. After the end of the Ottoman rule, the Turks vacated from both nations and the Saudi Kingdom would be found from the ashes of the World War I while Lebanon fell under the French rule. It was not until the end of the World War II that saw the two nations officially establish relations.

The two countries established relations once World War II came to an end. In the first decades, Lebanon was embroiled with the conflict against Israel as part of greater Arab–Israeli conflict, Saudi Arabia provided political support for Lebanon but did not send any military force to assist the Lebanese. In 1952, the two countries established diplomatic relations; in the meantime, Lebanese president Camille Chamoun and King Abdulaziz exchanged visits a year later.

With the outbreak of the Lebanese Civil War, Saudi Arabia began to play the role as a peace broker for the Lebanese affairs, during which the Saudis sent a group of peacekeeping soldiers to the country before merging with the Arab Deterrent Force. However, it was that time witnessed the rise of the Islamic Iran, overthrowing the previous Shah's rule and Iran began prompting its presence via Hezbollah. This had raised alarm among the Saudi government and as for the result, with the Taif Agreement being signed, Saudi Arabia started to pour billions of dollars to reconstruct Lebanon in order to fend off growing Iranian influence.

=== 21st century ===
In 2008, the Saudi Foreign Minister, prince Saud Al Faisal secretly proposed setting up an Arab military force to fight Hezbollah in Lebanon with the help of the United States, UN and NATO. According to leaked diplomatic memos, Faisal has accused the UN troops in Lebanon of "sitting doing nothing", and voiced concerns that Iran will use Hezbollah to take over Lebanon.

In February 2016, Saudi Arabia decided to halt $3b package to Lebanese army, as Lebanon failed to condemn the attack on the Saudi diplomatic missions in Iran.

In 2017, Saudi Arabia and Lebanon were involved in a diplomatic conflict that almost sparked into a war, where Lebanon's Prime Minister Saad Hariri summoned his resignation under Saudi pressure to oust Hezbollah from Lebanon. This was followed by Saudi Arabia, Kuwait and the UAE calling its citizens to leave Lebanon. Later, Hariri revoked the resignation and continued to serve as Prime Minister until 2020.

In August 2020, Saudi Arabia sent 120 tonnes of supplies to provide humanitarian aid to the victims following the Beirut explosion. In May 2021, Saudi Arabia summoned the Lebanese ambassador, following controversial comments from the Lebanese Minister of Foreign Affairs and Emigrants, Charbel Wehbe, against their country.

On 29 October 2021, Saudi Arabia expelled Lebanese ambassador from the country after George Kordahi, a Lebanese minister, criticised Saudi Arabia's involvement in the Yemeni Civil War. It has been speculated that Hezbollah's involvement in favor of the Houthis the Yemeni Civil War was a major factor in this decision.

On December 4, 2021, George Kordahi resigned, stating in a news conference “I won’t accept being used as a reason to harm Lebanon and our Lebanese brothers in Saudi Arabia and other Gulf countries". After Kordahi's resignation, a phone call was held between the French president Emmanuel Macron, the Saudi crown prince Mohammed Bin Salman, and the Lebanese prime minister Najib Mikati.

On 3 January 2022, in a televised speech Hezbollah Secretary-General, Hassan Nasrallah, accused Saudi Arabia of exporting ISIL (ISIS) ideology and transporting cars rigged with explosives for suicide attacks to Iraq. Later on the same day, Lebanese prime minister, Najib Mikati said Nasrallah's criticism of Saudi Arabia did not serve Lebanon's national interest nor represent the country's official stance.

On the 7th of April 2022, relations were partially restored with the return of the Saudi Ambassador to Beirut.

On January 8, 2025, Prince Yazid bin Mohammed bin Fahd al-Farhan, landed in Beirut for an official visit. On 23 January 2025, Saudi foreign minister prince Faisal bin Farhan visited Beirut, the first visit of its kind since 15 years.

== Economic relations and financial aids ==
In 2001 and 2002, Saudi Arabia pledge to pay $700m in aid, during the Paris II conference to achieve Lebanon's economic development. The remittances from Lebanese expats in the Gulf countries accounted for 10–15% of their country's GDP from 1990 to 2004.

Following the 2006 Lebanon War, Saudi Arabia and Kuwait deposited $1.5b into Lebanon's central bank to support the Lebanese pound. A year later, Riyadh pledged $1b in aid to Lebanon, during a donor meeting chaired by French President Jacques Chirac. Moreover, Saudi Arabia, Kuwait and the United Arab Emirates had accounted 76% of the foreign direct investment projects in Lebanon from 2003 to 2015.

In April 2021, Saudi Arabia banned the Lebanese fruit and vegetable imports to Saudi Arabia due to the drug smuggling and after 5.3m captagon pills were found in pomegranates, until receiving guarantees from Lebanon to stop the smuggles. Then the Lebanese authorities said that they are putting huge efforts to fight drug smuggling and are ready to cooperate in this issue and called for "more cooperation" between Lebanon and Saudi Arabia. However, Arabian Peninsula states import 55% of Lebanese fruit and vegetable export, which is worth between $20m and $34m annually.

== 2025 ==
In March 2025 Lebanese President Joseph Aoun visited Riyadh in a significant step to strengthen Lebanese-Saudi relations, address political challenges, and thank Crown Prince Mohammed bin Salman for his role in resolving Lebanon's presidential vacancy. By making Saudi Arabia his first international destination, Aoun highlights the importance of bilateral ties and seeks to enhance economic collaboration. This visit reaffirms the historic partnership between the two nations, dating back to King Abdulaziz’s era, and aims to foster regional stability, economic growth, and cooperative foreign policy initiatives. Foreign Minister Youssef Rajji accompanyied him on the trip, while Lebanese Ambassador to Saudi Arabia, Dr. Fawzi Kabbara, joined the delegation upon their arrival in Riyadh.

== See also ==
- Foreign relations of Lebanon
- Foreign relations of Saudi Arabia
- Lebanese people in Saudi Arabia
