= Al Olaya bombing =

1995 terrorist incident in Saudi Arabia

Al Olaya bombing تفجير العليا
- Location: 24.696126805134178°N 46.67673583032501°E; Al Olaya District, Riyadh, Saudi Arabia
- Date: 13 November 1995; 30 years ago 11:20 AM (UTC+3)
- Attack type: Car bomb
- Deaths: 7
- Injuries: 60
- Perpetrators: A group sympathetic to Palestinian cleric Abu Muhammad al-Maqdisi and possible members of Al Qaeda

The Al Olaya bombings was a terrorist attack which occurred in the central district of the Saudi capital Riyadh on the morning of 13 November 1995 and targeted US Army personnel present at the headquarters of the Saudi Arabian National Guard Modernization Program. The attackers used a car bomb parked near the cafeteria of the building, with a timing device detonation. The perpetrators were a group of militants sympathetic to the Jordan-based Palestinian-cleric Abu Muhammad al-Maqdisi (famously affiliated to Abu Musab Zarqawi). The attack left seven people dead, five US Army personnel and two Indian workers, and injured 60 other people. The four perpetrators were all arrested. Saudi TV aired their confessions and they were tried, sentenced to death and executed.

The aired confessions of the attackers were the first time that the name of Abu Muhammad al-Maqdisi came out to the public. In a 1996 interview, al-Maqdisi confirmed to have met the perpetrators and re-confirmed it later in another 2005 televised interview. The attack did not garner a lot of media attention, but it was the first time that the organization which would later be known under the name Al-Qaeda targeted the US military.

== The perpetrators ==
1. Abdulaziz Al-Ma'tham : personally met Abu Muhammad al-Maqdisi and got a fatwa from him. During an interview with Aljazeera aired in July 2005, Al-Maqdisi confirmed that several meetings had indeed taken place between the two and that Al-Ma'tham visited him in prison and met with his children. Although al-Maqdisi acknowledged giving fatwas to Al-Ma'tham, he denied that he had given him a fatwa to carry out this attack in particular.
2. Maslah ash-Shamrani.
3. Riyad al-Hajiri.
4. Khalid as-Said.
