= Sheikh Ahmed Salim Swedan =

Kenyan al-Qaeda member

- Born: 9 April 1960 or 1969; Mombasa, Kenya
- Died: 1 January 2009 (aged between 39 and 47); Pakistan

Sheikh Ahmed Salim Swedan (9 April 1960/1969 – 1 January 2009) was a fugitive wanted in the United States as a participant in the 1998 U.S. embassy bombings. He was alleged to have purchased the Toyota and Nissan trucks used in the attacks, flying out of Nairobi to Karachi, Pakistan five days before the assault was launched. Swedan was on the FBI Most Wanted Terrorists list since its inception in October 2001. He was born in Mombasa, Kenya.

The UN 1267 Committee referred to him as Ahmed Salim Swedan Sheikh. He was also known as Sheikh Ahmad Salem Suweidan, Sheikh Ahmed Salem Swedan, Sheikh Swedan, Sheikh Bahamadi, Ahmed Ally, Bahamad, Sheik Bahamad and Ahmed the Tall.

Swedan had, in the past, managed a trucking business in Kenya. He purchased a beige Toyota Dyna truck in Nairobi, and a 1987 Nissan Atlas refrigeration truck in Dar es-Salaam. Six metal bars were used to form a "cage" on the back of the Atlas, to accommodate the bomb.

== Rumors of capture ==
As the first anniversary of the 9/11 attacks approached, a few unsubstantiated reports came out of Pakistan that various wanted al-Qaeda suspects had been captured in that country and handed over to the Americans without any legal process.

On 12 July 2002, a police officer in Karachi reported that Pakistani authorities had arrested Sheikh Ahmed Saleem, referring to him as an alleged financial advisor of Osama bin Laden in Pakistan. He was reportedly caught along with two other al Qaeda militants. The officer further misidentified Saleem as a Sudan national, who had apparently fled Afghanistan for Pakistan after the US-led military campaign began in October 2001. The three militants were arrested together during an overnight raid on a suburban apartment in the commercial port city of Karachi.

However, it later was suggested that Pakistani news organizations and the officials may have confused Ahmed Salim, the FBI-wanted Kenyan who had run a trucking business, with a Sudanese man with a similar name, Mamdouh Salim. In fact Mamdouh Salim had already been captured in 1998 in Germany.

On 9 September 2002, the Lahore-based Daily Times once again reported that Ahmed Salim had indeed been arrested earlier that summer, on 11 July 2002, in Mithadar, an area very close to the place from where Khalid Sheikh Mohammed was also arrested a month earlier, according to the paper. But KSM was actually captured a year later. On 11 September 2002, journalist Syed Saleem Shahzad of the Asia Times wrote that back in July 2002, Pakistani intelligence agents were led to Salim's cell by satellite telephone intercepts provided by the FBI. These led to the arrest in Karachi of a more junior al-Qaeda figure, a Saudi known only as Riyadh or Riaz. Riyadh in turn led investigators to Salim, who was arrested in Kharadar in the south of the city. Amnesty International quoted two more press claims that Swedan had been arrested in July 2002, and transferred to US custody.

On 6 July 2007, Swedan was listed as a possible CIA "Secret Prisoner" by Amnesty International, despite the fact he remained on the FBI's Most Wanted Terrorist list on the published date (6 July 2007).

== Death ==
On 1 January 2009, Swedan was killed in Pakistan in an American unmanned drone missile strike along with Fahid Mohammed Ally Msalam at an al-Qaeda safe house.
