= Hezbollah Al-Hejaz =

Shia militant organization operating in Saudi Arabia, Kuwait, and Bahrain

Hezbollah Al-Hejaz حزب الله الحجاز
- Logo of Hezbollah Al-Hejaz
- Leaders: Abdelkarim Hussein Mohamed Al-Nasser; Ahmed Ibrahim Al-Mughassil
- Dates active: 1987–present (mostly inactive since 1989)
- Active regions: Saudi Arabia (1987–present) (mostly inactive since 1989)
- Ideology: Shia jihadism Shia Islamism; Khomeinism
- Status: Practically ceased to exist
- Size: 20

Hezbollah Al-Hejaz (Arabic: حزب الله الحجاز, lit. 'Party of God in the Hejaz'), or Hizbollah in the Hijaz, is a militant Shia organization operating in Saudi Arabia. It was founded in May 1987 in Saudi Arabia's Eastern Province. In the years 1987–89 the party launched attacks against official Saudi targets inside and outside Saudi Arabia. After being implicated in the Khobar Towers Bombing in 1996, the party was outlawed in Saudi Arabia. The party was part of the Iranian government's "exporting the Islamic Revolution" policy. Most of its members were arrested and the party practically ceased to exist. In 2014 it was designated a terrorist organization by the Kingdom's government.

== Early Activities ==
The first years after the Iranian Revolution, the relations between Iran and Saudi Arabia were tense and even hostile. A major source of conflict was the Saudi authorities’ treatment of the Shia minority in the Kingdom's Eastern Province. Another important factor was the Saudi support for Iraq in the Iran–Iraq War.

Relations between the two countries improved in the mid-1980s, but suddenly took a negative turn in 1987 after a violent episode during the Mecca pilgrimage of that year. Demonstrations of Iranian pilgrims were violently suppressed, which led to a stampede that killed over 400, mainly Iranian, pilgrims.

The Hizbullah of the Hijaz was founded in May 1987 with active encouragement from Iran. Hijaz is generally used as the name of the western part of Saudi Arabia. Here it was denoting the whole country, as using the name Saudi Arabia would imply recognition of the Al Saud ruling dynasty.

The organization carried out several attacks in Saudi Arabia in the second half of the 1980s. In August 1987, an explosion occurred at a petroleum facility in Ra's al-Ju'ayma and in March the following year a petrochemical industry in Jubail was attacked. Ra's Tanura refinery was also attacked. Several Saudi policemen were killed and wounded in clashes with Hizbullah fighters. The Saudi authorities answered with widespread arrests among suspected Shia activists. The organization was also strongly suspected of being responsible for a number of attacks against Saudi targets abroad, such as diplomats etc. These attacks were never officially claimed by Hezbollah al-Hejaz.

After the end of the Iran-Iraq war in 1988, relations again thawed between the two countries. In 1993, King Fahd, responding positively to more moderate parts of the Shia opposition, met several of its representatives. Desiring to end Shiite opposition to the government, Fahd promised to work towards improving conditions for Shiites in Saudi Arabia. This took the form of, amongst other things, ordering the elimination of derogatory terms for Shiites from textbooks, removing certain other forms of explicit discrimination, and of allowing many Saudi Shiite exiles to return to Saudi Arabia.

Although formally not a partner to the agreement and even voicing disagreements with it, Hizbullah al-Hejaz members were included in the amnesty and the organization generally abided by its terms. The organization's members mainly refrained from overt opposition politics and concentrated on religious, social and educational activities.

== Khobar Towers bombing ==
In June 1996, a massive truck bomb exploded outside the US Air Force base at Khobar in eastern Saudi Arabia, killing 19 American soldiers and wounding several hundred. Subsequent American and Saudi investigations blamed Hizbullah al-Hijaz for the attack. From its founding in 1987, the Hezbollah al-Hejaz group had advocated violence and perpetrated several terrorist attacks in Saudi Arabia during late 1980s. After the diplomatic thaw between the Saudi Arabian and Iranian governments in 1990, the group ceased its attacks in the early 1990s. A series of crackdowns launched by the Saudi government after the Khobar Towers bombing almost completely eradicated the organization.

After the East Africa embassy bombings in 1998 and especially the September 11 attacks in 2001, several observers expressed doubts about the true culprits of the Khobar bombings. Former US Secretary of Defence William Perry asserted in 2007 that he now believed that al-Qaeda was responsible for the Khobar attack. Back in the day, US had not taken al-Qaeda seriously. However, al-Qaeda never claimed responsibility for the attacks. Thomas Hegghammer asserted that, during that period, al-Qaeda lacked the sufficient technical capacity to launch such an extensive attack.

Others have said that on balance, the available evidence suggests Shiite responsibility. After the Khobar bombing most of the members and people associated with the Hezbollah al-Hejaz were arrested by Saudi authorities. The organization practically ceased to exist.

Many of the members of the organization have since been released. Several others, including those indicted by US authorities, still remain in jail in Saudi Arabia without trial.

The alleged head of the military wing of Hezbollah al-Hejaz, Ahmed Ibrahim Al-Mughassil, who was suspected of involvement in the Khobar bombing, was reportedly captured in Beirut in August 2015 and transferred to Saudi Arabia.

== Designation as a terrorist organization ==
- Saudi Arabia: 7 March 2014
- United Arab Emirates: 15 November 2014

== See also ==
- List of political parties in Saudi Arabia
- Hezbollah (Lebanon)
- Kata'ib Hezbollah (Iraq)
- Harakah Hezbollah al-Nujaba (Iraq)
- Liwa Assad Allah (Iraq & Syria)
- Jaysh al-Mu'ammal (Iraq & Syria)
- Harakah al-Sabireen (Palestine)
- Jaysh al-Mahdi (Iraq)
- Islamic Movement (Nigeria)
- Ansar-e Hezbollah (Iran)
- Hezbollah Movement in Iran
- Hezbollah Movement in Iraq
- Sadrist Movement
