= Ahmed Khadr =

Canadian citizen with alleged al-Qaeda ties (1948–2003)

- أحمد خضر
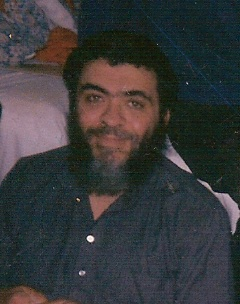
- Khadr in Peshawar, Pakistan, in 1995
- Born: Ahmed Saïd Khadr; March 1, 1948; Cairo, Egypt
- Died: October 2, 2003 (aged 55); Wana, Federally Administered Tribal Areas, Pakistan
- Cause of death: Shot and killed by Pakistani security forces
- Other name: Abu Abdurahman al-Kanadi
- Citizenship: Egypt; Canada
- Alma mater: University of Ottawa
- Employer: Human Concern International
- Known for: Alleged ties to Osama bin Laden and al-Qaeda in Afghanistan
- Spouse: Maha el-Samnah (m. 1977)
- Children: 7 (see Khadr family)

Ahmed Saïd Khadr (Arabic: أحمد سعيد خضر; March 1, 1948 – October 2, 2003) was an Egyptian-Canadian with alleged ties to al-Qaeda in Afghanistan and Pakistan. His activity in Afghanistan began in response to the Soviet invasion of Afghanistan in 1979, and he has been described as having had ties to a number of militants within the Afghan mujahideen, including Saudi militant Osama bin Laden. Khadr was accused by Canada and the United States of being a "senior associate" and financier of al-Qaeda in Afghanistan.

During this period, Khadr worked with a number of charitable non-governmental organizations that served Afghan refugees and set up agricultural projects. He set up two orphanages for children whose parents had been killed over the course of the decade-long Soviet–Afghan War. He funded the construction of Makkah Mukarama Hospital in Afghanistan with his own savings, as well as seven medical clinics in the Afghan refugee camps of Pakistan.

Due to his prominent regional role, Khadr helped negotiate compromises among rival Afghan warlords, power brokers, and leaders in order to establish peace in the region. The Canadian government had considered him to be the locally highest-ranking member of al-Qaeda. In 1999, the United Kingdom added Khadr's name to a list of al-Qaeda members compiled with the United Nations.

Shortly after the American-led invasion of Afghanistan in 2001, two of Khadr's sons were captured separately by American troops in 2002. They were later detained at the Guantanamo Bay detention camp in Cuba. Aged 15 at the time of his capture, Omar Khadr was among the youngest detainees at the camp, and the last citizen of a Western country (Canada) to be held there. Omar accepted a plea deal (which he later recanted) and pleaded guilty to charges of war crimes in October 2010; he was repatriated to Canada in 2012 to serve the remainder of his sentence and was released on bail in 2015.

On October 2, 2003, Khadr was killed by Pakistani security forces during a gunfight with al-Qaeda and Taliban militants near the Afghanistan–Pakistan border. Following his death, his family members moved back to Canada, where they remain today.

== Early life ==
He was born in Egypt in 1948 to Mohamed Zaki Khadr and Munira Osman. Raised in Shubra El-Kheima, Khadr was a shy child with a speech impediment. He frequently stayed at the house of his much older half-brother Ahmed Fouad. When Fouad left for the United States in the early 1970s, Khadr asked his father if he could follow – but was forbidden. Planning the move behind his father's back, Khadr moved to Montreal, Quebec, Canada in 1975 at the age of 27.

After a few months in Montreal, Khadr moved to Toronto. He was accepted at the University of Ottawa to study Computer Programming. In Ottawa he met Qasem Mahmud, the founder of Camp Al-Mu-Mee-Neen in Creemore, Ontario. Khadr volunteered to help at the camp. There he met Maha el-Samnah, a Palestinian immigrant and volunteer. She was impressed by his calmness and thought he was a good listener. Mahmud later described their meeting as "love at first sight".

== Marriage and family ==
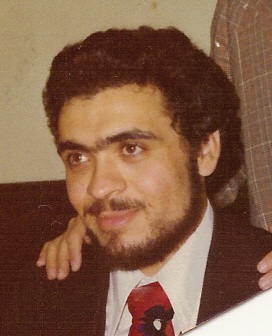
Khadr at his Toronto wedding.

Ahmed and Maha married in November at Jami Mosque in Toronto. In May 1978, the couple moved to Ottawa so Ahmed could finish his studies. In 1979, Maha gave birth to their first child and daughter, Zaynab.

Khadr joined the Muslim Students Association at the university. He came to agree with their notions of Sharia law, and advocated Islamic rule for his native Egypt.

Khadr started working at Bell Northern Research, while writing his master's thesis, entitled Development of a CSSL interface to GASP IV. Maha gave birth to their son Abdullah in 1981.

== Career ==
The following year, Khadr was offered a position at the Gulf Polytechnique University in Bahrain, where he hoped to become a professor. According to a biography published by al-Qaeda in 2008, he did not like living in Canada, so he accepted the position.

In 1982, Maha gave birth to Abdurahman, their third son. Disappointed to find Western influences in Bahrain, Khadr became interested in the struggle of Afghans as a result of the Soviet invasion. He wanted to help the Muslim widows and orphans in Afghanistan.

Through 1983 and 1984, the family lived in Bahrain while the children were in school. During the summer holidays, Khadr traveled to Pakistan. His wife took the three children to Scarborough, Canada, where they lived with her parents. Khadr told friends that he had no intentions of helping to fight the Soviets, only of helping the victims of the invasion.

== Charitable work begins ==
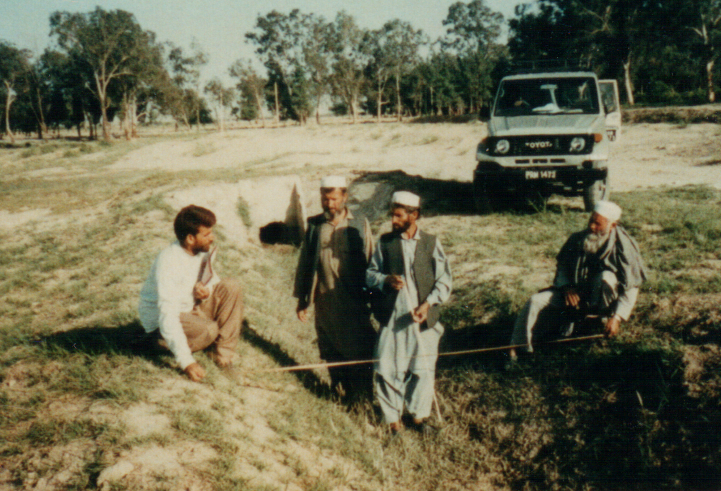
Khadr's Toyota Landcruiser in background; workers measuring an irrigation canal.

During his 1984 summer in Pakistan, Khadr joined Lajnat al Dawa, a Kuwaiti-run relief organization to help Afghan refugees living in Pakistan after the Soviet invasion. He returned to Toronto in December with his family, to explain his decision to Maha's parents. After returning briefly to Bahrain, the family stopped in Kuwait to meet the charity's organizers. By January, they had settled in a second-floor apartment above the Kuwait Red Crescent Society's offices in Peshawar, Pakistan.

While in Pakistan, Khadr became known by the kunya Abu Abdurahman al-Kanadi (Father of Abdurahman, the Canadian), due to the community mistaking which of his sons was eldest. Refusing to abandon his Western clothing, Khadr frequently took care of the children while Maha volunteered at the Red Crescent hospital. During his time in Pakistan, Khadr met with the journalist Eric Margolis several times. He later said that Khadr was a "man of respect" in the city, and seemed "entirely humanitarian and not ideological at all".

The family returned to Canada several times a year, visiting relatives. Khadr conducted fundraising for his charitable work, giving speeches at mosques and community events. During one of the visits back to Toronto, on July 6, 1985, Maha gave birth to the couple's fourth child, Ibrahim. Diagnosed with a congenital heart defect, the boy was transferred to the city's Hospital for Sick Children for surgery.

Three months later, the family returned to Peshawar. That year, Khadr met Abdullah Anas, an Algerian who had helped fight the Soviets in northern Afghanistan. Anas would later describe Khadr as "not a man of fighting, not a man of jihad, just a man of charity work aid". He also became acquainted with Abdul Rasul Sayyaf, the founder of the Islamic Union for the Liberation of Afghanistan and a mujahideen warlord, with whom Khadr would later nurture a close relationship.

Returning to Toronto in the summer of 1986, Ibrahim underwent more surgery. On September 19, Maha gave birth to another son, Omar. Six days later, the 39-year-old Khadr was featured in the Toronto Star, calling attention to the plight of Afghanistan. He condemned the Soviets for cluster bomblets and landmines disguised as colorful toys, attracting children who picked them up and sometimes lost limbs.

In the autumn, the family returned to Peshawar, where Khadr met Ayman al-Zawahiri, a doctor who had been convicted in Pakistan five years earlier for arms dealing. The doctor was then working in the Red Crescent hospital treating wounded refugees. The two quickly became friends, and had many conversations about the need for Islamic government and the needs of the Afghan people. At this time, the family was living in a "tiny" apartment on an $800 monthly allowance.

In 1987, Khadr convinced his wife to let her parents take care of their sickly son Ibrahim in Scarborough. He said she could help a hundred Afghan children in Peshawar if she sent him back for care. He often praised the bravery of the fighters in the Battle of Jaji to his children, but never suggested that he had participated.

In January 1988, Maha returned to Toronto with her youngest, Omar, to look after Ibrahim so her parents could visit relatives in the Middle East. Ibrahim became sick during the visit, and was rushed to the hospital. He was pronounced brain dead the following morning.

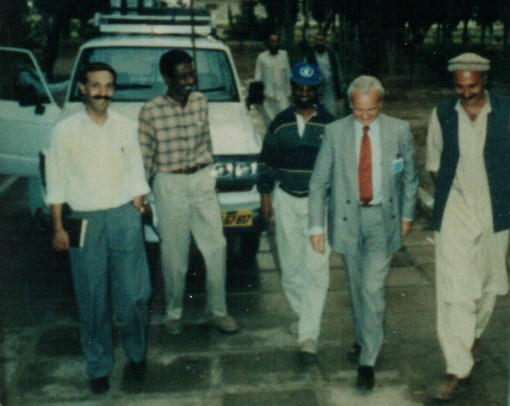
In a photo taken by Khadr, members of the WFP come to meet him and tour his agricultural projects.

That year, Khadr joined Human Concern International full time; it was a Canadian-based charity operating in Peshawar with which he had been cooperating. The charity had been investigated following a statement by Osama bin Laden that "The bin Laden Establishment's aid covers 13 countries ... this aid comes in particular from the Human Concern International Society". Under Khadr's leadership, HCI built Hope Village in Akora Khattak to house 400 orphans, and a number of unemployed refugees were given work repairing damage at the Khost airfield. He gained the support of the World Food Programme, and a $325,000 donation from the Canadian International Development Agency.

Around this time in 1989, Khadr solicited aid from Canadian Doreen Wicks. She agreed to have her own charity send medical supplies to help the Afghan orphans.

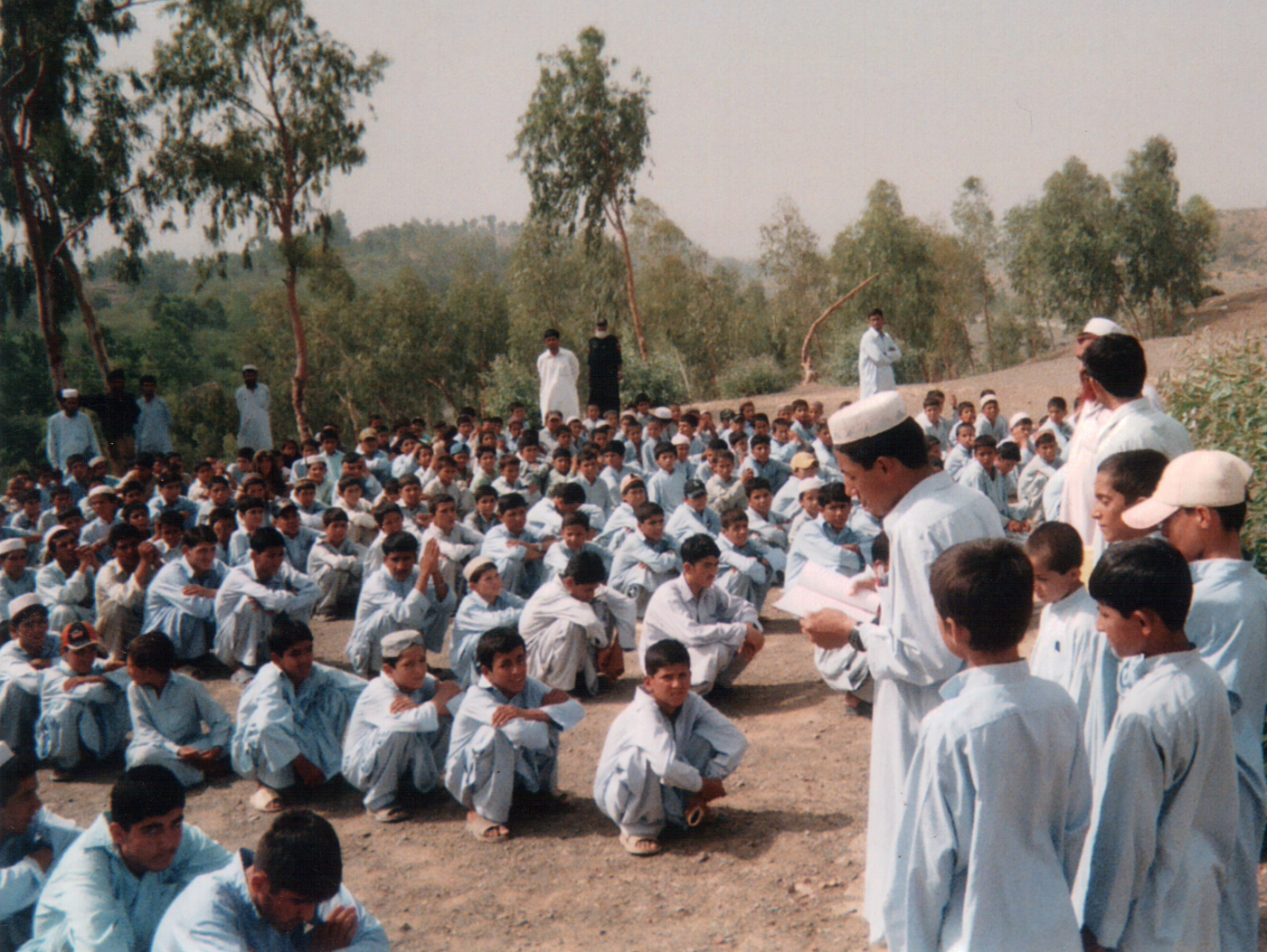
An outdoor class being taught at Khadr's Hope Village orphanage.

Not long after, Anas spoke to Abdullah Azzam about the need to ensure Muslim help reached northern Afghanistan, and not just that of Western NGOs. Azzam appointed Khadr in charge of a new charity to be affiliated with the Muslim World League NGO. Khadr promised to help raise funds for a new Peshawar-based charity, to be named al-Tahaddi (The Challenge), if Azzam gave him an endorsement to help him appeal to Canadian mosques.

Citing a disagreement with Khadr, Abu Hassan al Madani and Enaam Arnaout led the Islamic Benevolence Committee to withhold its donation to al-Tahaddi, so Wael Julaydan met with Khadr on 19 October 1988 to discuss the financial shortfall and issues. Khadr and Julaydan signed a contract specifying the exact roles of personnel and funds in the group, but it appears Khadr didn't notice the clause that would allow a steering committee headed by Azzam to replace any administrative staff. Within days, Khadr received notice that he was being replaced just before his scheduled trip to Canada.

On November 2, unknown men assumed to be associated with Azzam broke into Khadr's Peshawar offices and seized documents, leading to the freezing of al-Tahaddi's accounts with Habib Bank and a shifting of the project's assets to a Saudi Red Crescent warehouse. When he returned to Peshawar, Khadr accused Azzam of "confiscating" the money he had raised, and spreading rumors that he was a Western spy by having faxed all of al-Tahaddi's associates with a list of accusations against Khadr and announcing new leadership.

Khadr demanded a Sharia court be convened to mediate the matter, and sought Sheikh Rabbani, Sheikh Sayyaf, Yunus Khalis or Gulbuddin Hekmatyra to arbitrate. It was ultimately led by Sayyed Imam Al-Sharif and Abu Hajjer al-Iraqi in Osama bin Laden's compound on December 26, and Azzam was found guilty in absentia of spreading allegations against Khadr and ordered to return the money to the charity for which it had been raised, and to return Khadr as director of the charity. No further sentence was imposed, although Azzam refused to comply with the Court Order which aggrieved al-Sharif who later published a book in which he characterizes Azzam as having rejected the sharia by his default, although Ayman al-Zawahiri later wrote a piece in which he criticised al-Sharif for being too quick to judge Azzam's intentions and reminding readers that both parties were noble mujahideen. When Azzam was killed in 1989, Khadr was among the mourners at his funeral.

In 1989, Maha gave birth to a fifth son, Abdulkareem. Eight months after the end of the Soviet invasion, Khadr was profiled in the Toronto Star newspaper, pleading for Western aid to help Afghanistan rebuild; he noted the nation had the highest child mortality rate in the world. Around this time, he began to adopt the kurta and pakul associated with the Mujahideen, giving up Western clothing.

In September 1991, Khadr gave a fundraising lecture entitled Afghanistan: The Untold Story at the Markham Islamic Centre. He described the suffering of the widows and orphans, but emphasized the valor of the mujahideen who had repelled the Soviets. They had been supported by the United States at the time.

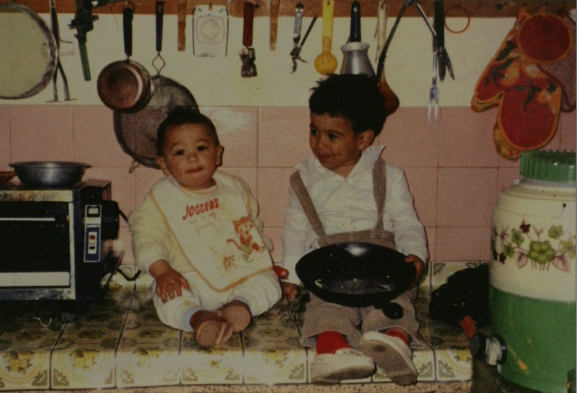
Abdulkareem (left) and Omar (right)

In 1992, Khadr sustained severe shrapnel wounds which tore apart his right side, puncturing his bladder and a kidney. The exact cause of the wounds is debated, Human Concern International maintains that Khadr was inside one of their refugee camps when he stepped on a landmine, while his son Abdurahman has said that he was hurt by a bomb during the ongoing battles between warlords.

Unable to get proper medical care in Peshawar, he was taken to Karachi. Maha convinced him to return to Toronto a month later, and he was admitted to Sunnybrook Health Sciences Centre. Although there were fears he'd never walk again, or his arm would require amputation, his surgeon managed to treat Khadr successfully. His half-brother Ahmed Faoud came up from the United States to visit Khadr, who was growing restless with his long recovery time.

According to Mustafa Hamid Khadr had quietly played a role in resisting the Soviet Union.

Abu Abdul Rahman al-Kanadi did excellent work during the jihad against the Soviets but it has not been well recognised, especially the military work he did in Logar province. As you know, Logar is in between Paktia and Kabul. Abu Abdul Rahman al-Kanadi trained at Sadda and was at Jaji with Abu Abdullah; he and Abu Abdul Rahman al-Surahyi did a fantastic job with their observation work and giving guidance for the Arab activity. When the enemy discovered their hiding place, the jets bombed the area very heavily but they were not hurt.

== Return to Pakistan ==
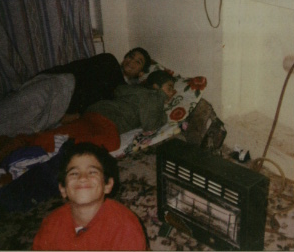
Three of the Khadr sons, Abdurahman (rear), Abdulkareem (middle) and Omar (foreground) in an apartment in Peshawar.

In the autumn of 1993, Khadr returned to Pakistan with his family, renting a comfortable house with its own garden in Hayatabad while he continued working with HCI despite his injuries. Without the use of his right hand and walking with a limp, Khadr found his injuries frustrating.

Before leaving for Tajikistan in 1994, a young Ibn Al-Khattab gave Abdulkareem a rabbit, which was named Khattab. The rabbit's legs were injured during rough play with his youngest daughter Maryam, and the crippled Ahmed would often sit in the backyard, crying over it.

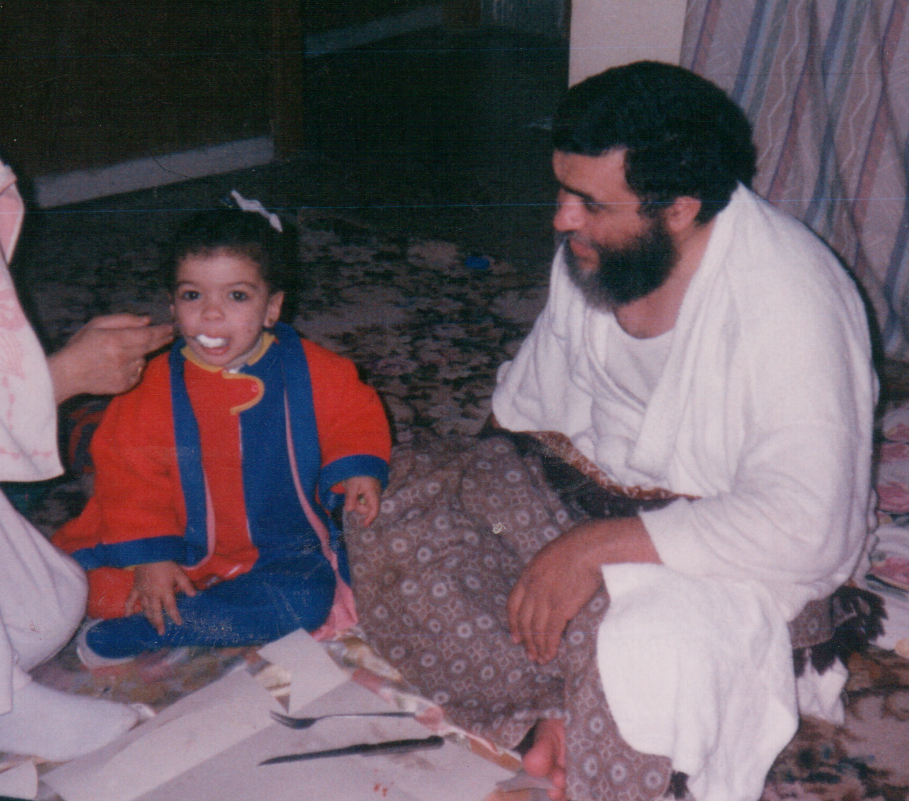
Khadr watches as his wife Maha feeds their youngest daughter.

Human Concern International had struggled with the year-long absence of Khadr's management, and had hired Abdullah Almalki from Carleton University to replace him. Almalki was on sabbatical leave at the time of Khadr's return. The two managers clashed, as Khadr's work ethic had changed after his injury. He had become a demanding workaholic who began alienating his colleagues. Almalki left HCI early, citing frustration with Khadr. Khadr's eldest son, Abdullah later confided in his father that he was not spending enough time with his family, due to his time and efforts towards the local orphanages.

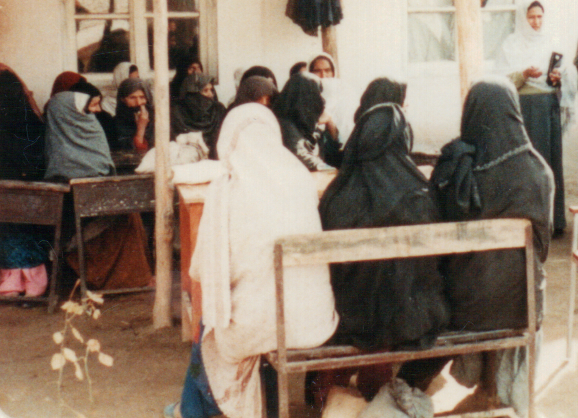
Nosaiba bint Kaab, a school for girls that Khadr built and named after a companion of the Prophet whom he admired.

Maintaining his connections with regional warlords, Khadr was furious at their in-fighting which he felt was invalidating the Mujahideen success in driving out the Soviets. Believing in the need for an Islamic government, he talked to his children about the rewards of martyrdom.

In 1994, he sent his two oldest sons, Abdullah and Abdurahman, to Khalden training camp. He visited the camp once after they started there, to meet with Ibn al-Shaykh al-Libi.

In Pakistan, Khadr renovated an abandoned building, which had previously used by the KhAD secret police, to be used for his charity, but once it was refurbished, the government announced they would re-take control of the building. An angry Khadr wrote a letter to Taliban leader Mullah Omar, complaining that he should be compensated for the money he spent in fixing the building. He clashed with the Taliban again when they objected to the fact he had opened a school for girls, who were not allowed to receive an education under Taliban law.

When Mohamad Elzahabi was injured in a 1995 battle in Kabul, Khadr visited him the Peshawar hospital.

== Arrest, investigation and release ==
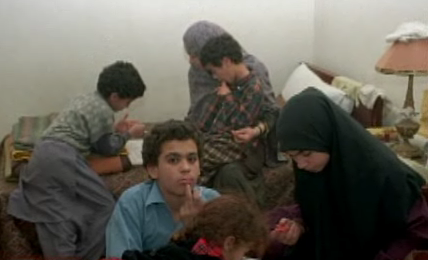
Maha (Abdulkareem in arms), Omar, Zaynab, Abdurahman (facing camera) and Maryam (foreground) in an Islamabad hotelroom while Ahmed was in prison.

In July 1995, Khadr arranged for his daughter Zaynab to marry an Egyptian man named Khalid Abdullah, "an Egyptian guest of the Taliban" from the Sudan, in December, and Maha began preparing an apartment for the couple in the family's house. Abdullah lived with the family for two months, "like a trial engagement".

On November 19, Ayman al-Zawahiri carried out an attack on the Egyptian Embassy in Pakistan, and the suitor Ahmed had arranged for his daughter went into hiding, named as one of the conspirators. A warrant was sworn for Khadr's arrest eight days later, after it was discovered that Khalid Abdullah had purchased one of the vehicles used in the attack. Two dozen Pakistani went to his house on November 27 at approximately 23:00, but he was still in Afghanistan and had been there since before the attacks. Maha barricaded the door, while the 15-year-old Zaynab took her father's rifle and held it over her head screaming. The police managed to enter, and took his wife, three children and in-laws who were visiting from Canada, into custody while they searched the house, seizing $10,000 $29,000 or $40,000 in cash from the home. While he insisted the money was to pay the salaries of HCI workers, others alleged he had used HCI to launder money eventually used to finance the attack. His wife and children were released shortly after the raid, while his in-laws were held for a month before being released.

Accounts differ as to whether Ahmed was arrested on December 3 at the border crossing back into Pakistan, or if he had returned to his home the previous day and gone to the police station to lodge a complaint about the raid, and been arrested. He was charged with aiding terrorism, and faced the death penalty, although investigators conceded they "did not have much evidence" linking him to the bombing.

After being refused food for two days, Khadr announced he was launching a hunger strike, which led to his collapse on his fifth day and his being transferred to the Pakistan Institute of Medical Sciences in Islamabad. He was interviewed in hospital, where he denounced Foreign Minister Assef Ahmad Ali's claim that he had financed the explosives, detonation devices, and both vehicles used in the bombing. He stated that his work consisted solely of charitable work to provide food and schooling to Afghan orphans. Foregoing legal advice, he also refused to hire a lawyer to defend him. Suffering from a urinary tract infection due to weight loss, he claimed that he had been targeted simply because of his Egyptian background.

His plight caught the attention of the Canadian Arab Federation and the Jewish Civil Rights Educational Foundation of Canada, the latter of whom wrote to Pakistan urging that Khadr be afforded a fair trial, and expressing their concern "about unfair and unnecessary hardship placed on individuals like Khadr" in Pakistan's efforts to combat terrorism. The Canadian-Muslim Civil Liberties Association similarly gathered a petition of 800 signatures and presented it to both Canadian and Pakistani officials, and Human Concern International executive director Kaleem Akhtar echoed his certainty that Khadr was not involved in the blast, stating that "politics was not his cup of tea", and subsequently started a legal defence fund for Khadr. Rumors began to surface that he had already been extradited to Egypt.

As Canadian prime minister Jean Chrétien happened to then be visiting Pakistan, he mentioned the matter to Pakistani prime minister Benazir Bhutto, who promised "fair trial and fair treatment". Lacking evidence to suggest Khadr was involved in the bombing, Pakistan dropped their charges and released Khadr in March. Upon returning to Canada, Khadr kissed the ground.

In 2002, Abul-Dahab confessed to Egyptian interrogators that he had funded the bombing of the Egyptian embassy on orders from bin Laden, and had transferred money from a Californian bank account to Pakistan to finance the attack.

== Health & Education Projects International ==
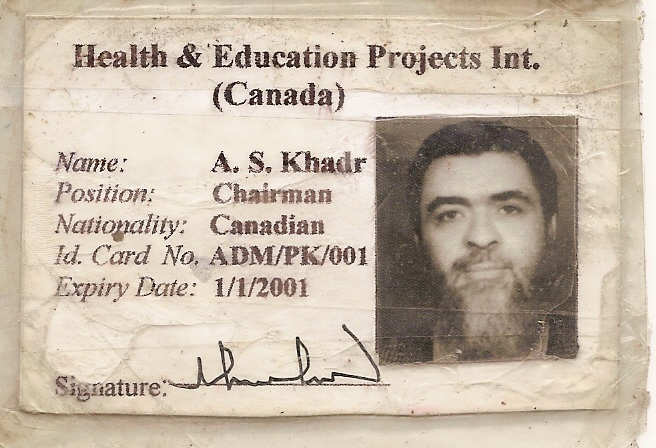
Khadr's identity card from HEP

Trying to distance themselves from the controversy, HCI issued a statement in December, stating that Khadr and his colleague Helmy el-Sharief no longer worked for the organization. Khadr then founded his own charity, Health & Education Projects International which was located in the Kart-e-Parwan district of Kabul and listed the Canadian Salahedin Mosque as a partner. American prosecutors have alleged the new group, while collecting $70,000 in donations, supported Afghan training camps. In July, Khadr met with bin Laden for the first time, as the latter was beginning construction on a large house.

In 1997, while living in the Pathan district of Peshawar, Khadr began visiting Nazim Jihad, bin Laden's family home in Jalalabad. In September, the Khadrs moved into a three-room house owned by Zaffar Rehman, to whom they paid $100 monthly rent. At an unspecified time during his life in Pakistan, Khadr made use of his master's degree and provided computer training and systems "for the government employees from 14 departments".

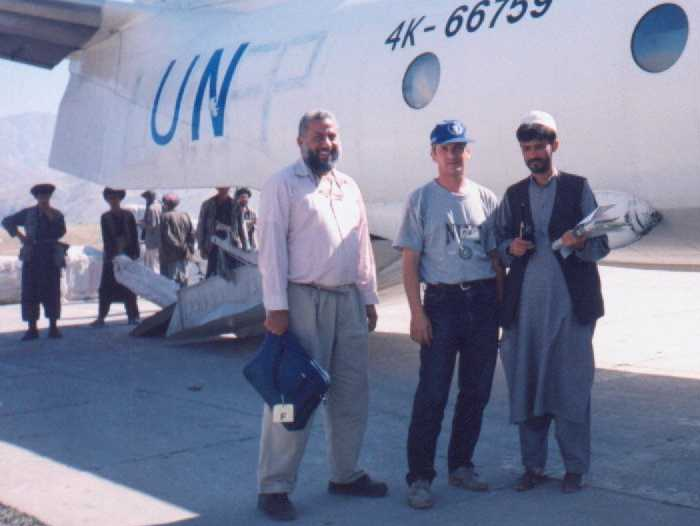
In May 1998, Faisebad was struck by an earthquake; Khadr's new charity was among those NGOs which accompanied emergency supplies to the area in United Nations flights.

In May 1998, Essam Marzouk and Mohammed Zeki Mahjoub were also introduced to each other at the home of Khadr's in-laws while he was in Toronto. Also that year, Mahmoud Jaballah met Khadr, having invited him to share a cup of tea and discuss their mutual experiences in Peshawar, Pakistan, after Khadr's mother-in-law took his wife grocery shopping. At some point, Mohammad Harkat met Khadr in Ottawa and the two of them shared a van back to Toronto. Harkat claims that he met Khadr through his roommate Mohamed El Barseigy, and that Khadr was silent during most of the trip, and his only advice to Harkat was "tell the truth to immigration authorities". Harkat and Jaballah would both later be jailed on security certificates which cited their contact with Khadr as a factor in their detention.

In June 1998, the family moved into Nazim Jihad while Ahmed was away; but were only there a short time before bin Laden moved and didn't invite the family to accompany him. He caved to the demands of his "problem child", Abdurahman, and purchased him a horse of his own.

That year, Pakistan renewed its claims that Khadr was involved in the embassy bombing, accused him of money laundering and smuggling and suggested he may have been connected to the year's simultaneous bombings of American embassies.

Reports suggest that when Pakistani forces stormed the apartment of an Algerian named Abu Elias in Lahore, Khadr was actually present but was either not recognised by the troops, or allowed to leave.

In 1999, Khadr met with bin Laden again to try to mitigate hostilities between bin Laden, the Taliban and warlord Gulbuddin Hekmatyar, whom Ahmed had recently met in Iran. That year, the United Kingdom submit his name to be put on a United Nations list of individuals believed to finance terrorism, but refused to share any evidence with Canadian officials. He was subsequently sanctioned, and UN states were forbidden from commerce with him.

In January 2001, Khadr's name was added to a United Nations list of individuals who supported terrorism associated with Bin Laden.

Later that year, Egyptian forces surrounded Khadr's house in Peshawar, and requested that Pakistani Inter-Services Intelligence forces offer assistance in capturing the man they still believed had knowledge of the embassy bombing in Islamabad. Instead, the ISI contacted the Taliban, who sent a diplomatic car to pick up Khadr and bring him into Afghanistan.

== Sought by the United States ==
Immediately following the September 11, 2001 attacks, the United States found Khadr's name while "seeking anyone they believe might be linked to bin Laden" and issued a statement that he was "wanted in connection with the Sept. 11 terrorist attacks", and on October 10 listed him as a "primary suspect". Three days later, the United States froze his assets.

Mr. Speaker, Ahmed Al-Kadr was named by the United Nations as a terrorist. He is a close associate of Osama bin Laden. He is a suspect in the September 11 terrorist attacks. Mr. Al-Kadr is now in Afghanistan allegedly working for a Toronto based group called Health and Education Project International. Human Concern International, Mr. Al-Kadr's former front organization for terrorist fundraising, has had its assets frozen not by this government but by the governments of the United States and the United Kingdom. Why has this government not frozen the assets of either of these organizations?

— Brian Pallister, House of Commons, 9/15/2001.

The family fled Kabul the day before its fall to the Northern Alliance, and made a temporary home in the Logar orphanage the night of November 10. This was the last time the United States knew the family's location. Maha and Ahmed returned however to gather their possessions. While packing, Kabul's walkie-talkie communications ring began reporting that the Taliban had been defeated and the city was being overrun. Running out to their car, they saw wounded men filtering into the streets. Tossing out their computer and a chair, the couple made room in their backseat for three men who had been injured in an explosion. They reached the Logar Hospital at 2am, but were told that only two of the men could be treated. Speeding off with the third, they continued to another nearby hospital but arrived to find their passenger had succumbed to his wounds. Returning to their children at the Logar orphanage, they were informed that Abdurahman had decided to take the truck to Kabul in their absence and spend the night with friends.

Shortly afterwards, Bin Laden approached Khadr and asked him to join the Mujahideen Shura Council, organising the retreat of families from the Northern Alliance onslaught, to the relative safety of the Pakistan border. In April 2002 it was believed that he had fled Nangarhar to Paktia, along with Mullah Kabir. He was noted for maintaining a close relationship with Maulvi Nazir.

Khadr's Canadian property was raided by the Royal Canadian Mounted Police as part of Project O Canada in January 2002. There was also reference to a "seized photograph" that showed Khadr standing alongside an anti-aircraft gun along with anti-Soviet mujahideen.

When his second son, Abdurahman was taken prisoner by the Northern Alliance in November, he sent a request to have his son freed since he had helped the Alliance in the past, but was told that unless he could pay a $10,000 ransom then Abdurahman would be turned over to the Americans. Lacking the money, Khadr asked his eldest son Abdullah to not tell his mother about Abdurahman's capture, and only insist that he was "missing", rather than captured.

In July 2003, the Federal Research Division of the Library of Congress stated that Khadr's last known whereabouts were in Afghanistan in November 2001. Meanwhile, Khadr was asked to organise militants operating near the border of Shagai, Pakistan, and subsequently asked his son Abdullah and Hamza al-Jowfi to help him procure weapons. He clashed with Abdul Hadi al Iraqi, arguing that guerilla tactics would prove more useful than front line battle.

== Death ==
On October 2, 2003, Khadr, his son Abdulkareem, al-Jowfi, al-Iraqi, Khalid Habib and Qari Ismail were all staying at a South Waziristan safe house. The following day, after Fajr prayers, Khadr told his son that Pakistani troops had warned a raid was scheduled in the village, and told him to start preparing to leave the village together. However, a Pakistani helicopter team and hundreds of security forces attacked the village before the pair were able to depart, and Abdulkareem lay down in a ditch but was shot in the spine, paralyzing him from the waist down. The 17-year-old Khalid Murjan Salim was arrested at the scene, the son of alleged militant Murjan Salim, and extradited to Egypt shortly thereafter.

Pakistan initially reported that Khadr had escaped hours before the raid. Other reports suggested that rumors of his death may have been staged to escape investigators. At one point it was reported that Ahmed had lived, and only his son had been killed. Early reports said that it was a joint American-Pakistani operation, while later reports denied American involvement.

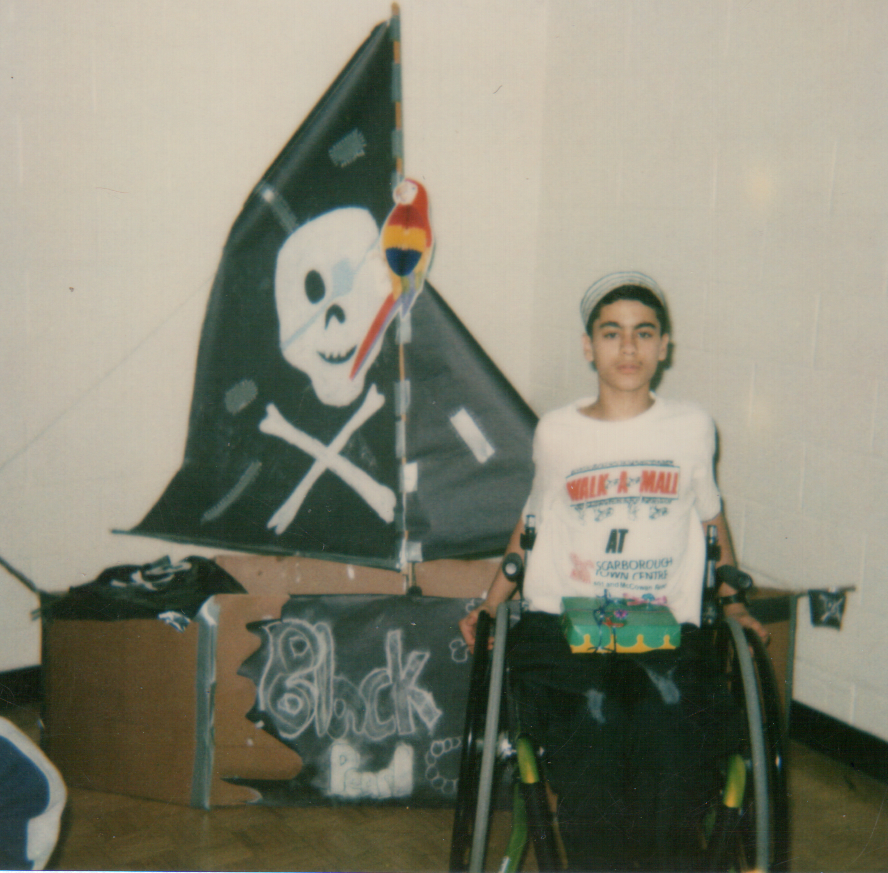
Abdulkareem in 2004, after returning to Canada, built this mock-up of Disney's Black Pearl.

Reports said that 12 "al-Qaeda and Taliban members" were killed in the raid on the "armed encampment", including Hasan Mahsum, and that two al-Qaeda members had been captured. Khadr's name was not included in any of the lists of deceased published in local media, and the captured Abdulkareem was unable to identify his father among the photos of corpses later presented to him, although the Islamic Observation Centre reported that Khadr was "caught" in the battle and died defending Abdulkareem. Three weeks after the attack, Pakistan was still reporting that he had escaped the raid and that they had been conducting house-to-house searches for him, although they spoke of having killed a "high-ranking" al-Qaeda member in the attack with a bounty on his head.

In late December, Maha had attorney Hashmat Ali Habib file a petition to the Supreme Court of Pakistan asking for details about whether her husband and son were killed or captured in the operation. Meanwhile, it was believed that the Saudi Sheikh Asadullah stepped up to fill the void left by Khadr's death

It was finally reported in January, three months after the operation, that his DNA had been matched to a body found just outside the doorway and he was indeed killed in the attack, leading his family to request the return of his body for burial in Canada. Arab News reported that he had only been killed in January, following another Pakistani strike in Wana, after successfully escaping the October firefight. In Canadian Federal Court Justice Carolyn Layden-Stevenson's 2005 ruling rejecting Hassan Almrei's application for release, she quoted a confidential CSIS agent named only as P.G. as having testified about Khadr dying in 2004.

== Civil lawsuit ==
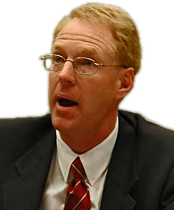
Judge Paul Cassells

Sgt. Layne Morris and Sgt. Speer's widow Tabitha, both represented by Donald Winder, launched a joint civil suit against the estate of Khadr – claiming that the father's failure to control son Omar resulted in the loss of Speers' life and Morris' right eye. Since American law does not allow civil lawsuits against "acts of war", Speer and Morris relied on the argument that Omar throwing a grenade was an act of terrorism, rather than war. Utah District Judge Paul Cassell ruled on February 17, 2006, awarding C$102.6 million in damages, approximately C$94 million to Speer and C$8 million to Morris. He said this likely marked the first time terrorist acts have resulted in civil liabilities. The Salt Lake Tribune suggested that the plaintiffs might collect funds via the U.S. Terrorism Risk Insurance Act, but since the Federal government is not bound by civil rulings, it has refused to release Khadr's frozen assets.

== Legacy ==
In one of the latest Musharraf-led campaigns, several mujahidin were killed, including brother martyr Ahmad Said Khadr, nicknamed Abu Abdurahman al-Kanadi. Al-Kanadi is one of thousands of Arab supporters whose blood was spilled in every valley and mountain in Afghanistan...

— Ayman al-Zawahiri, March 2004 Audiotape

After his death, the media began referring to a "Khadr effect". The Prime Minister had intervened to ensure that Khadr got a fair trial, and the press said that he had intervened after Khadr's release. The suggestion was that politicians and the public were equally unwilling to lend any support or benefit of the doubt to the remaining family.

On February 7, 2008, the National Post reported that a biography of Khadr was published on an "al Qaeda web-site" as part of an on-line book entitled Book of 120 Martyrs in Afghanistan. Seven months later, his family launched The Khadr Legacy which emphasized his work as a relief worker. By July 2013, the website was replaced with a Japanese facial care website.

Khadr remains a controversial figure. Canadian attorney Dennis Edney, lawyer for the Khadr family, has challenged the assumption that Khadr was a member of al-Qaeda, saying in 2001 that he was "really interested in obtaining one piece of evidence that would show indeed that Mr. Khadr was actually a terrorist. To me, it's just folklore." Khadr's imam in Canada, Ali Hindy, spoke after his death, saying "I don't think that he was al-Qaeda, but I think he felt that now he became part of Afghanistan." His friends described him as being "proud of [being a] Canadian citizen". Some politicians and media have suggested that he disliked the country.
