= Canadian response to Omar Khadr =

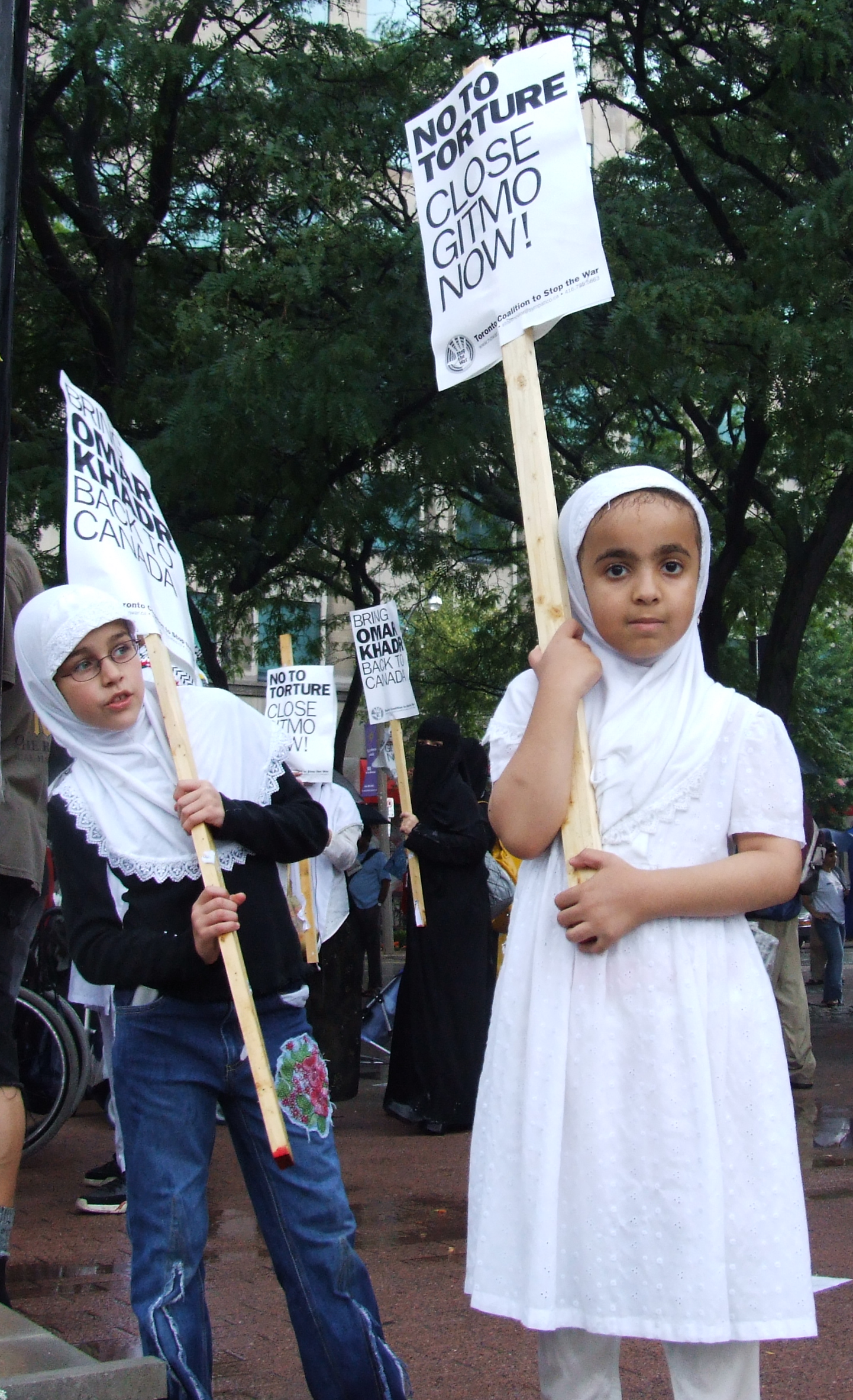
Two children at a 2008 protest demanding Khadr's repatriation.

A Canadian of Egyptian and Palestinian descent, captured by American forces in Afghanistan at the age of 15, Omar Khadr was the last Western citizen remaining in custody in Guantanamo Bay. Canada refused to seek his extradition or repatriation despite the urgings of Amnesty International, the Canadian Bar Association, and other prominent organisations. His lawyer Dennis Edney has summarised the differential response towards Khadr stating that "one of the problems" with defending the youth is that he's a member of the Khadr family rather than "a Smith or an Arar"

For several years following Khadr's capture in 2002, his case did not generate any "serious controversy". Once his military tribunals began however, his case drew considerable attention as a child soldier, with commentators seizing on the fact he is the youngest prisoner held in extrajudicial detention by the United States to face charges in the war on terror. By 2007, interest in his case had grown exponentially although Canadians remained divided on whether he should be repatriated.

Canada's three main opposition parties, the Liberals, NDP and Bloc Québécois, have all condemned former Prime Minister Stephen Harper for refusing to demand the United States turn Khadr over to Canadian authorities. Prior to Harper's appointment, two consecutive Liberal Prime Ministers had failed to make the same demand. In April 2008, Bill Graham, the former Foreign Affairs Minister, said that he regretted not having done more to help secure Khadr's release or repatriation while the Liberal government was in power.

A 2009 Security Intelligence Review Committee panel determined that the Canadian Security Intelligence Service failed Khadr, by refusing to acknowledge his juvenile status or his repeated claims of being abused.

In 2010, Khadr was convicted of five war crimes by a United States military tribunal at Guantanamo Bay, Cuba. In a 2012 poll, 60% of Canadian citizens opposed Khadr's return to Canada.

It has been postulated that the Government of Canada's Foreign Affairs Department did not attempt to help Omar Khadr for fear that sticking up for a Canadian citizen arrested in another country would come back to haunt the government. This refers to the events around former Liberal Prime Minister Jean Chrétien securing the release from Pakistan of Omar Khadr's father, Ahmed Khadr – only to have the family return to Afghanistan and Ahmed Khadr later killed in a firefight in Pakistan in 2003.

Omar Khadr was eventually returned to Canada and released on bail in 2015. Khadr launched a lawsuit against the Government of Canada.

== Early reaction ==
On September 5, 2004, Prime Minister Jean Chrétien said that he would ensure "due process and proper access to Canadian officials" for Khadr, and that he would be treated "in the same way that we deal with any Canadian arrested in any other country."

In 2002, prior to his position as Prime Minister, Alliance Party leader Stephen Harper commented that Omar Khadr represented "Canada being a platform for activities that are dangerous to the Western alliance." When Foreign Affairs began making press statements on the case through Henry Garfield Pardy that year, legal adviser Colleen Swords sent him an email telling him to "claw back on the fact [Omar] is a minor" in his statements on the case.

== Later developments ==
Question/Answers with the CBC
Q: What do you want out of life?
I just want to be as normal as any normal unknown Canadian
Q: When you think of Canada, what comes to your mind?
My most joyful memories of my life were in Canada … like school and going to the zoo and seeing the auto show which, until my last day, I had car posters and magazines
Q: What do you say to Canadians who may have fear of you?
First thing I tell them is not to fear me. I'm a peaceful person and to give me a chance in life and don't believe what you've heard and believe what you see with your eyes.
Q: What are your fondest moments of your life in Canada?
In a normal person there is a connection between him and the place where he was born even if he didn't always live in the country, but he will always want to return to it, and feels his soul connected to it, and that's how I feel.
Q: What are you looking forward to the most?
I always feel I'm in this world to help people and the best way to do that is to be a doctor to help anybody anywhere and anytime, and that's my future dream.
Q: What steps would you take to distance yourself from your past?
First I never had a choice in my past life, but I will build my future with the right bricks, and that Islam is a peaceful, multicultural and anti-racism religion for all.

Polls show respondents divided on Khadr's case, with nearly equal numbers believing he should be left in Guantanamo for the Americans to process, or that he should be repatriated to Canada. As of July 2010, 42% of those polled believed that Khadr faced an unfair trial at Guantanamo, although only 36% believed that meant he should be repatriated to Canada instead.

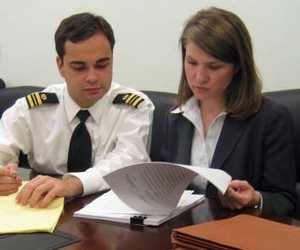
Kuebler and Snyder

In April 2008, the House of Commons of Canada Sub-committee on International Human Rights convened the country's first hearing on whether the House should request repatriation of Khadr to Canada; though, only the Governor General in Council has the authority to make such a request. Witnesses included Senator Romeo Dallaire, Foreign Affairs Minister Maxime Bernier, defence lawyers William C. Kuebler and Rebecca Snyder, and the United Nations High Commissioner of Human Rights Louise Arbour. At the hearings, Dallaire stated he was "going to be a pain" and "harass" the Conservative government until they intervened in the case.

In June 2008, the CBC sent Khadr six written questions and requested a response, which it subsequently published. Also in June, the Canadian government formally discussed the possibility of repatriating Khadr. It was suggested that Toronto Imam Hamid Slimi could draft a "religious rehabilitation" program in preparation for Khadr's return.

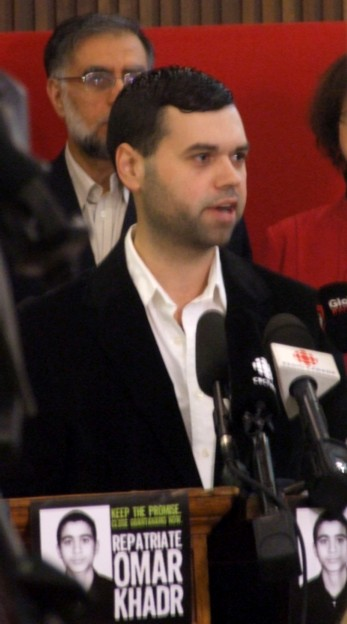
James Clark, spokesperson for the Coalition for the Repatriation of Omar Khadr, addresses media gathered in 2009

Two months later, his family launched TheKhadrLegacy.com in a bid to quell rumors about Khadr being foreign-born, a "citizen of convenience", or raised in a family of terrorists. Their attempts to speak on Omar's behalf were condemned by both his military and civil lawyers.

On 16 October 2008, the Canadian Broadcasting Corporation broadcast a 43-minute documentary "The U.S. vs Omar Khadr", produced by Nazim Baksh and Terence McKenna.

In October 2008, his older sister Zaynab Khadr began a hunger strike on Parliament Hill where she hoped to draw attention to the government's inaction on bringing her brother back to face trial in Canada. The following year, it was determined that Minister of Foreign Affairs Lawrence Cannon had misrepresented the case when he claimed that Khadr had built bombs to kill Canadian soldiers, since Canadian soldiers had not been operating in the area.

The week before Khadr's tribunal was scheduled to begin, 64% of Canadians polled stated that they believed Khadr should be repatriated to Canada if Guantanamo were closed; a marked increase since earlier polls. However, later opinion polls in September 2009 indicated that 52% of respondents felt no sympathy for Khadr's plight (a 7% increase since January 2009) compared with 38% that do.

In April 2010, the Canadian Conference of Catholic Bishops criticised the country for failing to uphold the law and repatriate Khadr, noting that "ideological indoctrination" seemed to have distorted public feelings about the case.

On February 25, 2013, Natalie Brender published an article criticizing a new immigration bill from Minister of Immigration Jason Kenney. The bill contained provisions for stripping Canadian citizenship from individuals who fought against Canadian Forces or engaged in terrorism. Brender suggested the bill was triggered by the Harper government's anger with Khadr, "whose current non-deportability (as a Canadian citizen) is seen by some Conservatives as an affront to the gravity of his actions in attacking coalition forces in Afghanistan."
