= Abdurahman Khadr =

Canadian citizen (born 1982)

Abdurahman Khadr عبد الرحمن خضر
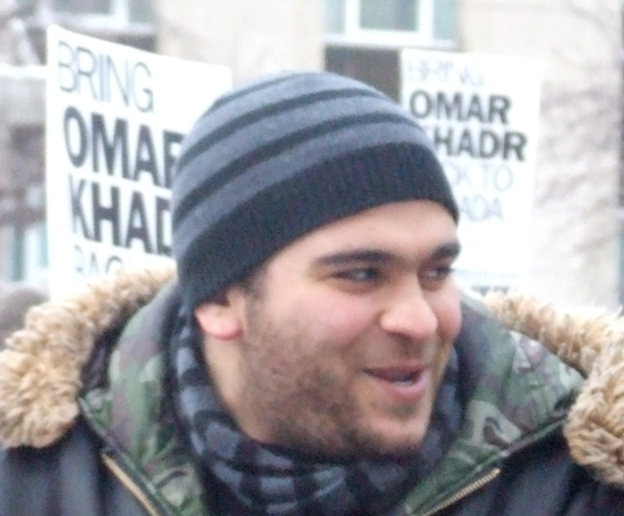
- Born: Abdurahman Ahmed Said Khadr; 1982 (age 43–44); Manama, Bahrain
- Detained at: Guantanamo
- ISN: 990
- Status: Released, living in Canada
- Parents: Ahmed Khadr; Maha el-Samnah
- Relatives: Omar Khadr (brother)

Abdurahman Ahmed Said Khadr (Arabic: عبد الرحمن أحمد سعيد خضر, ʿAbd ar-Raḥman Ḫaḍr; born 1982) is a Canadian citizen who was held as an enemy combatant in extrajudicial detention by the United States at the Guantanamo Bay detainment camps, in Cuba, after being detained in 2002 in Afghanistan under suspicion of connections to Al-Qaeda. He later claimed to have been an informant for the CIA. The agency declined to comment on this when asked for confirmation by the United States' PBS news program Frontline. He was released in the fall of 2003 and ultimately returned to Canada.

He is the third child and second son of Ahmed Khadr, an Egyptian immigrant who was known for ties to al-Qaeda, and his wife Maha el-Samnah, who is Palestinian. His younger brother Omar Khadr was captured by United States forces separately at the age of 15 in Afghanistan in 2002 during a firefight; he was held in Guantanamo for several years but transferred in September 2012 to Canadian custody.

== Early life and education ==
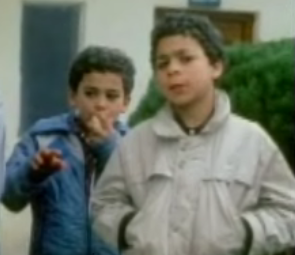
Abdurahman, behind his brother Abdullah.

Abdurahman Khadr was born in Manama, Bahrain in 1982, the son of Ahmed Khadr and Maha el-Samnah. Egyptian and Palestinian immigrants to Canada who had become naturalized citizens there, and met and married. His father went to graduate school in Ottawa, and then started working in Bahrain. Ahmed Khadr visited Pakistan after the Soviet invasion of Afghanistan in the early 1980s, and brought his family to Pakistan in 1985. There he worked for charities assisting Afghan refugees.

In his youth, Abdurahman Khadr was known as the "problem child" in the family, frequently running away and getting in trouble, refusing to follow rules, drinking alcohol and smoking cigarettes. He had an older sister and brother, three younger brothers and a younger sister.

In 1994, at the age of 12, Khadr was sent to Khalden training camp along with his older brother Abdullah, where he was given the alias Osama. The two brothers fought constantly at the camp, and one day their argument became so heated that they pointed guns at each other, screaming with fury. A trainer stepped between them. In 1997, a dispute between the brothers was mediated by the older Abu Laith al-Libi, who earned their confidence and respect telling them about the city of Dubai and imported Ferraris; he was later described as "really cool" by Abdurahman.

While the family was briefly living in Nazim Jihad with Osama bin Laden's family in 1998, Abdurahman became close friends with Abdulrahman bin Laden, who was near his age and the only child in the group to have his own horse, a fine Arabian. Abdurahman successfully persuaded his father to buy him a horse, too. Once, when the two horses fought, the young bin Laden pointed a gun at Khadr, yelling at him to stop the fight before his prized Arabian was killed.

When the family was leaving the compound, Abdurahman and his brother Abdullah fought over seating in the car. Their mother ended up asking bin Laden if he could take care of the troublesome Abdurahman since "she could not control him. He grudgingly agreed to look after the youth until his father returned. But, the next day bin Laden told Abdurahman that it would not work, and he asked Saif al-Adel to take the 16-year-old to the bus station so he could catch up with his family en route back to Peshawar."

The following year, at age 13, Abdurahman was sent to Jihad Wel al-Farouq for seven days; US officials have said the training camp was run by al-Qaeda personnel to train their militants. On August 20, 1998, the Al Farouq training camp was bombed by American cruise missiles and Amr Hamed, a friend of Khadr's, was killed. Khadr later said that as a youth, he had hated the Americans for killing his friend.

== Arrest and release ==
In November 2001, at the age of 19, Khadr was captured by the Northern Alliance in Kabul, where he was wandering around. An elderly man later claimed that Khadr had installed an anti-aircraft gun on the roof of a house. He was transferred to United States authorities on suspicion of having killed an American medic, but was released. He later claimed to have been captured several other times, and released each time.

At this point, accounts differ. Khadr claims he lived for nine months in a CIA safe house near the American Embassy in Kabul, and worked abroad as an informant. But other sources say he was taken to Guantanamo Bay on March 21, 2003 and held as an enemy combatant.

The New York Times later reported that the CIA offered Khadr a contract in March 2003 and asked him to work as an infiltrator for American intelligence in Guantanamo, to be paid $5,000 and a monthly stipend of $3000. While in Cuba, Khadr worked to obtain information from his fellow inmates before spending five additional months at the Camp X-Ray prison, where he claims to have been given training as an undercover CIA operative.

The Department of Defense published height and weight records for all but ten of the captives held in Guantanamo.

The United States later said that Khadr had been removed from the camp in July 2003. However, The Washington Post reported that an October 9, 2003, memo summarized a meeting between General Geoffrey Miller and his staff and Vincent Cassard of the ICRC; it acknowledged that camp authorities were not permitting the ICRC to have access to Khadr and three other detainees, due to "military necessity".

Khadr says he was later given a bogus passport and boarded a Gulfstream jet assigned to CIA Director George Tenet. He said that after a stop-over in Portugal, he landed in Bosnia where he was asked to conduct a spy operation at mosques in Sarajevo. Khadr states that he tried to approach Canadian embassies in various nations and was rebuffed at all of them. He phoned his grandmother Fatmah el-Samnah while in Sarajevo and asked her to go to the Canadian media and tell them that he had been stranded and refused entry back into Canada. He was finally granted admission to the Canadian embassy in Bosnia and was flown back to Canada on November 30, 2003.

On December 4, 2003, Khadr held a press conference with his attorney Rocco Galati. He discussed his role in the war on terror, but omitted later claimed cooperation with the CIA. The following month, he denied reports by the Toronto Star that he had been released in exchange for giving the Americans information on the location of his father, who was killed by Pakistani soldiers in Waziristan two weeks before Abdurahman's release.

== Interviews ==
In March 2004, Khadr gave a series of three interviews to PBS, which became the basis of a documentary entitled Son of al Qaeda. (He had largely passed a polygraph test.) He claimed to have grown up in "an al-Qaeda family", and said that he resented his father's associating with militants.

Khadr has offered a number of conflicting accounts of his life. For example, he has claimed that he was as young as 9 when he began attending Afghan training camps, and that he remained in them until as late as 2003, years after he had not only been kicked out of the camps, but was detained by the United States. He has repeatedly made comments suggesting that everything up until his most recent story was a lie.

== Passport issue ==
In July 2004, Khadr was denied a Canadian passport by Governor General Adrienne Clarkson, on the explicit advice of Foreign Affairs Minister Bill Graham, by invoking the royal prerogative. Graham claimed the decision was "in the interest of the national security of Canada and the protection of Canadian troops in Afghanistan." National security was not listed as a ground of refusal in the Canadian Passport Order at the time. It was, however, added as a ground shortly thereafter, on September 22, 2004. Under the terms of the amendment, the Minister was empowered to revoke or refuse to renew or issue a passport on national security grounds.

Khadr sought judicial review of the Minister's decision. On June 8, 2006, the Federal Court ruled that the Minister did not have the power to deny Khadr's passport in the absence of specific authority set out in the Canadian Passport Order, but stated in obiter dicta that if the Order were to be amended (as it had been after the fact), Khadr would likely not be able to challenge the revocation. On August 30, 2006, the Minister of Foreign Affairs, then Peter MacKay, with the support of Prime Minister Stephen Harper, again denied Khadr's application, this time on the basis of the now-amended Canadian Passport Order.

== Various claims ==
- Although Mahmoud Jaballah has said that he never met Ahmed Khadr while in Peshawar, Abdurahman Khadr has said that he had seen Jaballah around the city.
- When the CIA asked Khadr for the names of Canadians who had attended Khalden, he listed Amer el-Maati, Ahmad el-Maati, Amr Hamed and another Canadian he knew only as Idriss, who he said was arrested for conspiring to attack an embassy in Azerbaijan. He later claimed that Amer el-Maati had given his Canadian passport to Idriss.
- He has said that his family ran a guesthouse for Canadians wanting to train with al-Qaeda.

== Movie deal ==
On January 9, 2005, Variety reported plans to make a movie based on Khadr's life.
