= Qari Ismail =

Taliban commander

Qari Ismail قاری اسماعیل
- Born: Afghanistan
- Occupation: Taliban member

Qari Ismail, a Taliban commander, was credited with downing an American Special Forces helicopter responding to Operation Red Wings in June 2005, killing all 16 soldiers aboard.

On 2 October 2003, Ismail, Ahmed Khadr and his son Abdulkareem, al-Jowfi, al-Iraqi and Khalid Habib were all staying at a South Waziristan safe house. The following day, after Fajr prayers, Khadr told his son that Pakistani troops had warned a raid was scheduled in the village, and told him to start moving. A few minutes later, a Pakistani helicopter team and hundreds of security forces attacked the village.

In August 2004, Pakistan reported that it had arrested Ismail as a "key element" of al-Qaeda.

== See also ==
- Deobandi jihadism
