= Abdullah Khadr =

Canadian-born Pakistani militant (born 1981)

Abdullah Khadr عبد الله خضر
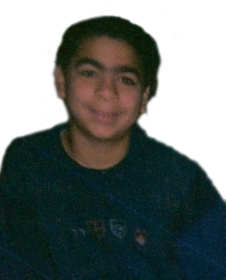
- Khadr as a youth.
- Born: Abdullah Ahmed Said Khadr; April 30, 1981 (age 45); Ottawa, Ontario, Canada
- Parent(s): Ahmed Khadr; Maha el-Samnah

Abdullah Ahmed Said Khadr (Arabic: عبد الله أحمد سعيد خضر; born April 30, 1981) is a Canadian citizen whose alleged ties to terrorism resulted in a protracted international legal issue. Born in Canada, he grew up in Pakistan. As the oldest son of Ahmed Khadr, who had ties to the Afghani Mujahideen, Abdullah was sent to the Khalden military training camp as a boy. As a young adult, he allegedly became an arms dealer, selling illicit weapons to militants involved in the War in Afghanistan and related conflicts.

Abdullah Khadr's connections to terrorism resulted in the United States posting a $500,000 (equivalent to $815,606 in 2025) bounty on his head. He was captured by the Pakistani military in 2004. The Pakistani government refused to extradite Khadr to the United States, but eventually struck an extradition deal with Canada. He was repatriated to Canada in 2005, and shortly after was arrested on an extradition warrant to the United States. A lengthy case ensued to prevent his further extradition. It was concluded by an appeal to the highest court in Ontario; the judges unanimously decided in October 2011 in favor of the lower court to refuse the extradition request. Khadr was released from custody after 4½ years.

== Early life and education ==
Abdullah Khadr was born in 1981 in Ottawa, Ontario, Canada as the second child and first son to Ahmed Khadr and his wife Maha el-Samnah, while his father was still in graduate school in computer science. He was the oldest of five boys, and had two sisters, one older and one much younger.

With his family, he moved as a child to Pakistan in 1985, where he largely grew up. The family frequently returned to Canada to see grandparents and other relatives. Abdullah and his siblings went to local schools and were also home-schooled by their mother.

In 1994, Khadr was sent to Khalden training camp along with his younger brother Abdurahman, where he was given the alias Hamza. Omar Nasiri later claimed to have met Abdullah in the camp's infirmary. Khadr told Nasiri about seeing Afghans in Khost blown apart while trying to salvage an unexploded bomb. Abdullah did not remember the encounter. The two brothers fought constantly at the camp; one day their argument became so heated that they pointed guns at each other, screaming, before a trainer stepped between them. In 1997, a dispute between the brothers was mediated by the al-Qaeda leader Abu Laith al-Libi, who earned their confidence and respect by telling them about the city of Dubai and imported Ferrari cars. Abdurahman later described him as "really cool."

As the oldest son, after becoming old enough to drive, Abdullah often drove his father around Pakistan for his work; the older man had been severely injured in an accident in 1992. In 2000, Khadr allegedly had contact with a "high level member of al-Qaeda" who took the 19-year-old with him to purchase weapons for fighting against the Northern Alliance militants and supplying an Afghan training camp.

Following the American invasion of Afghanistan in the fall of 2001, the family split up. Their mother took the youngest children, Omar and a daughter, into the mountains in Waziristan, in order to be further away from potential targets for US bombing.

In 2002, his sister Zaynab took their younger brother Abdulkareem to Lahore with her while seeking medical aid for her two-year-old daughter Saferai. Abdullah later joined his siblings in Lahore, as he needed surgery on his nose.

A Taliban spokesman said that the January 26, 2004 suicide bomber who killed Cpl. Jamie Murphy in Kabul was "Mohammed", the son of a Canadian purportedly named Abdulrahman Khadr. The similar names led analysts to speculate the bomber had been Abdullah; he was the only son of the Khadr family whose whereabouts were then unknown. DNA samples from the remains of the bomber later proved it was not Khadr.

When interviewed for the 2004 documentary Son of al Qaeda, shown on PBS in the United States, Khadr acknowledged attending the Khalden training camp as a youth. But he said that a ten-year-old learning to fire an AK-47 was as common in Afghanistan then as it was for a Canadian child to learn to play hockey.

Richard J. Griffin, Assistant Secretary of State (Diplomatic Security) for the United States later called Khadr "one of the world's most dangerous men."

== Time in Pakistan ==
In their December 2005 indictment, United States officials alleged that in 2003, Ahmed Khadr was asked to organise militants operating near the border of Shagai, Pakistan. He asked his son, 22-year-old Abdullah Khadr, to help him procure weapons, as the younger man had some experience. According to the US indictment, Khadr procured weapons for his father, and became an arms dealer, selling weapons to other militants and earning about $5000 in profit on the transactions. They involved approximately $20,000 worth of mortar rounds, landmines, grenades and 7.62×39mm AK-47 ammunition. After his father Ahmed Khadr was killed on the border by Pakistani security forces in October 2003, Abdullah allegedly continued his trade in weapons.

According to the US indictment, Khadr also allegedly aided militant friends by helping them operate a GPS unit in Pakistan. He said they wanted to measure the distance between a local graveyard and a house Khadr believed belonged to Prime Minister Shaukat Aziz. The house was that of President Pervez Musharraf. Khadr's friends were later arrested near the graveyard.

Khadr is alleged to have purchased a forged Pakistani passport for 30,000 rupees ($600), and to have given it to his sister Zaynab for safekeeping.

In October 2004, Khadr was allegedly purchasing five Soviet 9K38 Igla Surface-to-air missiles for $1000 apiece from a 29-year-old Pakistani member of Lakshar e-Taiba. He offered to split the profit upon selling the weapons for $5000 apiece to the same man who had taught him how to acquire munitions in 2000.

=== Arrest ===
In 2004, an "American intelligence agency" classed Khadr as a threat, and offered a $500,000 bounty for his capture. Khadr was arrested by the Pakistani military in Pakistan on October 15, 2004. Four days after his capture, "agents of the United States", including an FBI agent, visited the "quasi-prison" to interview Khadr. The visits continued for seventeen days.

The Canadian government learned of Khadr's capture in November 2004. Details of the US bounty on Khadr were initially hidden from the public, under claims it would threaten national security to admit the fact. In 2007 a Canadian memo dated October 19, 2004 describing the bounty was accidentally released. Reporters were warned not to publish the information, and The Globe and Mail newspaper took the government to court to fight the secrecy order. Justice Richard Mosley ruled that the information could be made public in May 2008, stating, "the fact that a foreign state paid a bounty for the apprehension of a Canadian citizen abroad and that Canadian officials were aware of it at an early state is also a matter in which the public would have a legitimate interest."

Several weeks after arresting Khadr, Pakistan officials allegedly offered to repatriate him to Canada, but Canadian officials refused. They suggested that Pakistan look into turning him over to the U.S. Federal Bureau of Investigation (FBI) instead. In April 2005, the Royal Canadian Mounted Police (RCMP) arranged for officers from Project A-O to fly to Pakistan to question Khadr for three days. One account suggested this was to prove that they were a "self-sufficient intelligence agency".

Khadr said that when he was about 14 years old, his father had purchased two pairs of walkie talkies from Abdullah Almalki. His lawyers later argued that he made the statement due to mistreatment by Pakistani officials. He was also questioned about Amer el-Maati, who he said had worked as a carpet salesman after al-Qaeda had refused to grant him a pension following a brain injury stemming from a 1992 car accident. Asked about Mahmoud Jaballah, Khadr said he knew him only as an Arabic tutor in Peshawar who went by the patronymic Abu Ahmed. Asked about the Toronto Imam Aly Hindy, Khadr said that Hindy's son Ibrahim had briefly attended the Musab al-Surri Afghan training camp several years prior to 9/11. The RCMP later concluded that it was unlikely they could prosecute Khadr under Canadian law, since any statements made following "mistreatment" by Pakistani officials would not be considered valid in Canadian courts.

In June 2005, Canadian officials believed that negotiations with Pakistan to extradite Khadr had succeeded. They removed Khadr from no-fly lists, hired guards to escort him, and issued Khadr an emergency passport, no. EC016094. They planned for him to fly with escorts to Canada aboard a British Airways flight from Islamabad, scheduled to land in Toronto at 18:00, June 15, 2005. Canadian consular officials were "mystified" when Khadr did not appear at the airport. It sent a note to the Foreign Affairs office stating, "Given subj[ect] is now not returning to Cda, grateful mission wld ask Pakistani authorities what happened, where he is, which authority is holding him, etc. etc, and a new consular visit asap".

In July 2005, the FBI agent Gregory T. Hughes and Diplomatic Security Service agent Galen J. Nace interrogated Khadr for three days, who was still being held in Pakistan. On each day, Khadr waived any Miranda rights and agreed to speak with them. He repeated his earlier confession regarding his alleged training in Khalden, and purchasing munitions for the same "high level member of al-Qaeda" he had worked with in 2000.

Pakistan refused to transfer Khadr to the United States, insisting he should be returned to Canada. On November 23, 2005, a Boston federal district court accepted prosecutor James B. Farmer's request for a request to extradite Khadr from Canada. Eight days later the Canadian government agreed to accept Khadr from Pakistan. The timing led critics to speculate that Canada was helping the United States get around Pakistan's refusal to transfer Khadr to American forces.

== Return to Canada and extradition request ==
Abdullah Khadr returned to Toronto, Ontario, Canada on December 2, 2005, accompanied by two officials from the Foreign Affairs department. They were met by RCMP officer Konrad Shourie and others, who interviewed him for two and a half hours. Two days later, Khadr agreed to another interview with FBI agents in the presence of Shourie. Court documents confirmed that he and his sister Zaynab Khadr were both under investigation by the RCMP for terrorism-related offences. Commentators expressed confusion about why they had not been charged with criminal offenses under Canadian law. During his sixteen days of freedom in Canada, Khadr was under constant RCMP surveillance.

On December 17, 2005 Khadr was phoned by the Canadian police and asked to meet them at a nearby McDonald's restaurant in Toronto. When he arrived with family members, Khadr was arrested based on a United States extradition order filed in US district court in Boston. The RCMP insisted the arrest "had nothing to do with" Canadian police. His mother was arrested after she hit one of the police officers. His brother Abdurahman Khadr was with them and took photos of the arrest with his camera phone.

The next day, Prime Minister Paul Martin spoke at length about Abdullah Khadr and other members of his family. He reiterated that there was only one kind of Canadian citizenship, and that Abdullah Khadr, and the other members of his family, were as entitled to all the legal protections as any other citizen.

Khadr's lawyers tried to have a publication ban bar media from reporting on the bail hearing held for the suspect. Prosecutor Robin Parker opposed this request, citing the open courts principle. Justice Anne Molloy of Ontario's Superior Court of Justice refused to order the publication ban, and ultimately denied bail. He was represented by Nathan Whitling, Dennis Edney and James Silver. In court Khadr wore a black T-shirt reading "For the Future of Islam." His maternal grandmother Fatmah el-Samnah offered to act as his surety, putting up her $300,000 house as collateral. The motion for bail was opposed by the prosecutor Robin Parker, who referred to United States claims that the forged passport Khadr had purchased in Pakistan was to allow him to travel to a country without an extradition treaty with the United States. Judge Molloy found there was an unacceptable risk that Khadr would flee, and also that the public confidence in the administration of justice would be undermined were she to grant Khadr bail. A second application for bail, brought by Khadr before Justice Gary Trotter, was also refused.

Khadr was held at Toronto West Detention Centre. On May 22, 2006, Khadr was involved in a brawl with another inmate over telephone privileges there. He appeared in court shortly afterwards, where he was represented by the attorney James Silver. His extradition hearing was set to begin October 30.

On April 7, 2008, Khadr appeared in a Toronto court to argue against extradition to the United States. He alleged that his confessions in Pakistan were obtained through torture. The government had classified evidence which was not shown to the public, but was shared with both Khadr and his lawyers; the judge Richard Mosley wrote a private summary of the information it contained. Khadr argued that the evidence was what he had said to convince Pakistani interrogators to stop torturing him.

On October 5, 2009 Khadr testified about his capture and treatment in Pakistan. Colin Freeze, writing in The Globe and Mail about Khadr's claims of torture, reported: "Ultimately, the judge will decide how to square Mr. Khadr's alleged admissions with such legal principles as the right to remain silent and the right to counsel, in determining whether any of his statements ought to count at all." Isabel Teotonio, writing in the Toronto Star, reported that Khadr testified that he was beaten and "penetrated" by a rubber paddle during the fourteen months he spent in Pakistani extrajudicial detention.

Following final arguments regarding the USA's request to extradite Khadr on April 7, 8 and 9, 2010, the Ontario Superior Court Justice Christopher Speyer denied the extradition request on August 4, 2010. Abdullah Khadr was set free after 4½ years. Khadr told reporters after his release, "I think this is going to be a new beginning for me in life."

Michelle Shephard, the Toronto Star's national security expert, reported that Speyer's ruling was 62 pages long. According to Shephard, Speyer criticised the $500,000 bounty offered by the US, and the abuse Khadr suffered in Pakistan. The justice wrote: "the rule of law must prevail over intelligence objectives."

Dennis Edney, one of Abdullah's lawyers, said, "When a U.S. government or any foreign government steps into a Canadian court they have to arrive with clean hands."

In 2010 his attorney Nathan Whitling stated, Khadr is engaged to be married.

=== Appeals ===
The Attorney General of Canada initiated an appeal on behalf of the USA before the Ontario Court of Appeal. On May 6, 2011, the appeals court affirmed the lower court's decision that Khadr should not be extradited. The highest court in Ontario unanimously confirmed in a 3-0 ruling, the original judge's decision to deny the extradition request.

The Federal government tried to initiate an appeal before the Supreme Court of Canada. On November 3, 2011, the Supreme Court announced they would not review the US request to extradite Khadr.
