= Amr Hamed =

Amr Mohamed Hamed
- عمرو محمد حامد
- Died: August 20, 1998; Al Farouq training camp, Afghanistan
- Other names: Amer Ahmed
- Occupations: Basketball player, Co-founder of 4-U Enterprises

Amr Mohamed Hamed (Arabic: عمرو محمد حامد) (also Amer Ahmed) was a Canadian who died in the American bombing of an Afghan training camp on August 20, 1998, as retaliation for the African embassy bombings.

== Life in Egypt ==
While living in Egypt, Hamed had played for the Egypt national basketball team. However, he immigrated to Canada, landing at Lacolle, Quebec and making his way westward to Vancouver, British Columbia.

== Life in Canada ==
In 1998, he co-founded an import-export business named 4-U Enterprises with his "best friend", former Egyptian Essam Marzouk who shared his love of sports. The two shared their faith, Islam, openly, and would sometimes disappear into the forests of the coastal mountains for days at a time as a spiritual retreat to memorise the Quran.

Considered to be "naive and inexperienced", he followed Marzouk seeking "the adventure of Afghanistan" and lived for a while with the Khadr family in Pakistan.

== Death and legacy ==
On August 20, 1998, Al Farouq training camp was bombed by American cruise missiles and Amr Hamed was killed.

In November 2001, the Royal Canadian Mounted Police investigated claims that the Northern Alliance had discovered an "al-Qaeda office" in Kabul that contained business cards reading 4-U Enterprises - Amr H. Hamed with the address for a rented postal box in a B.C. convenience store. The same search also yielded a number of documents belonging to Amer el-Maati.

In 2003, he was referred to by Abdurahman Khadr, who told authorities that "a lot" of Canadians had trained at Khalden, including "a Vancouver man he knew as Amer, who was killed in a 1998 U.S. missile strike".

In their 2008 report concerning Mahmoud Jaballah, the Canadian Security Intelligence Service (CSIS) misidentified Hamed and Essam Marzouk as being the same person.
