= Essam Marzouk =

Egyptian spy

- Born: Cairo, Egypt
- Other names: Essameddin Hafez, Isam al-Din Hafez, Fawzi Mesit Ibn Fahd Al Harbi, Abu Thir El Masri Adnan
- Alleged to be a member of: Al-Qaeda and Egyptian Islamic Jihad
- Penalty: 15 years imprisonment
- Status: Imprisoned

An Egyptian resident of British Columbia, Essam Hafez Mohammed Marzouk (عصام حافظ محمد مرزوق) arrived in Vancouver, British Columbia, Canada in 1993 as a refugee fleeing persecution in Pakistan. He was one of 14 people subjected to extraordinary rendition by the CIA (in 1998, from Afghanistan to Egypt) prior to the 2001 declaration of a war on terror. Marzouk was the contact point for a bin Laden terrorist cell in Canada.

In 1999, he was sentenced in Egypt to 15 years hard labour for being a member of the Egyptian terrorist group al-Jihad and for his role as an al-Qaeda training camp supervisor that trained two of the embassy bombers in the 1998 United States embassy bombings. Marzouk was released from prison during Mohamed Morsi's presidency and was later arrested in Malaysia after a failed terrorist plot then got deported back to Egypt.

== Life ==
Born to a wealthy engineer in Cairo, Marzouk grew up in a 5th-storey apartment at 2 Doctor El-Mahroky Street in the suburban Mohandeseen district of Cairo. Following his service in the Egyptian Army, he told his father he wanted to study in the United States, but instead moved to the Federally Administered Tribal Areas along the Pakistan-Afghanistan border at the age of 19.

In 1986 and 1987, he worked as an ambulance driver at the Red Crescent hospital in Peshawar, Pakistan where he met Egyptian-Canadian Ahmed Khadr, and later worked with the Muslim World League.

From 1988-1993 he is alleged to have run an Afghan training camp for al-Jihad.

== In Canada ==
In 1993, Marzouk acquired two fake Saudi passports and flew to Khartoum, Sudan, on May 23. Once there, he acquired tickets to fly from Damascus, Syria, to Vancouver, British Columbia, Canada, connecting with Lufthansa Flight 492 in Frankfurt, Germany.

Dressed as a Saudi sheikh and calling himself Fawzi Al-Harbi, he was arrested in Canada when immigration official Gordon Peterson became suspicious of his story of being an "Arab volunteer" in Afghanistan and Pakistan, ordered a search of his luggage and found his fake identity cards. Ali Mohamed had travelled from California to meet Marzouk at the airport. Airport security noticed him waiting for "Al-Harbi" and questioned him, before releasing him. While in prison, on charges of using a forged document, fraud and illegally entering the country, Marzouk applied for refugee status, claiming he feared religious and political persecution in Egypt. He was once shown a Time magazine article about the World Trade Center bombing in 1993, and asked if he knew any of the people involved, in the presence of his lawyer Phil Rankin.

Six months after Marzouk's arrest, Mohamed returned from his trip to Sudan where he met with Osama bin Laden, and brought Abul-Dahab with him. Dahab later told Egyptian interrogators he had withdrawn $3,000 from a Californian bank account on orders of bin Laden himself, to offer as bail money to Marzouk's lawyer. The pair hoped to have Marzouk released and possibly smuggle him into the United States. Mohamed was viewed suspiciously and subsequently detained by the Royal Canadian Mounted Police (RCMP) himself. However, after a brief phone call with U.S. Federal Bureau of Investigation (FBI) agent John Zent, Mohamed was identified as a CIA agent. Marzouk spent nearly a year in detention in Canada before his refugee status was confirmed and he was released. Canadian authorities prevented him from being given permanent resident status due to their suspicions, and instead granted him refugee status on December 12, 1994.

Rankin allowed him to move briefly into his family home, describing him as "very polite" and allowing him to babysit his young son.

Marzouk married a Canadian woman named Yasmine Mohammed, who bore him a child. He was tentatively employed as a truck driver, and was living on social assistance with a net worth of approximately C$20,000 and was being physically followed by Canadian intelligence agents.

In 1997, the FBI found Marzouk listed in an address book taken from Wadih El-Hage's Nairobi house.

That year, Marzouk co-founded an import-export business named 4-U Enterprises with his "best friend" in Canada, former Egyptian Amr Hamed who shared his love of sports. The two shared their faith openly, and would sometimes disappear into the forests of the coastal mountains for days at a time as a spiritual retreat to memorise the Quran. In February 1998, he sold off his company assets.

== Arrest and imprisonment ==
After five years, and his wife getting a divorce from him, Marzouk left Canada and flew to Turkey, where he is believed to have met with Ahmad Agiza before returning to Eastern Afghanistan. After his friend Hamed was killed in the American bombing of an Afghan training camp, as retaliation for the 1998 United States embassy bombings, Marzouk flew to Dubai and onward to Europe, before quickly doubling back to Dubai and booking a flight to Azerbaijan.

In August, a wiretapped phonecall tipped off the Israeli Mossad that a rendez-vous between Ihab Saqr and an Iranian MOIS official was planned in Baku, Azerbaijan. Without a bureau in Azerbaijan, they contacted the American CIA, who allowed a Canadian-raised Mossad agent to unofficially tag along as seven or eight CIA officers based in Frankfurt oversaw a local police raid on the Baku hotel room on August 20.

When the Azeri police received confirmation that Saqr was in his hotel room drinking coffee with others, they stormed the room grabbing all three people they found present and brought them still barefoot to the police station. The Iranian official hadn't yet shown up, and they had instead arrested Saqr, as well as Ahmad Salama Mabruk and Marzouk, who was wearing a "shabby business suit". They were brought to the police station, where the Mossad agent says the police "beat the crap out of them".

Marzouk was extradited to Egypt, who initially denied they had him - during which time he alleges he was tortured. He was accused of acting as a trainer to two of the embassy bombers. He was put before a military tribunal on March 16, 1999, as part of the Returnees from Albania trial, with Montasser al-Zayat as his lawyer. He was sentenced to 15 years hard labour. Marzouk was released from prison during Mohamed Morsi's presidency and was later arrested in Malaysia after a failed terrorist plot then got deported back to Egypt.

In November 2001, the Royal Canadian Mounted Police investigated claims that an "al-Qaeda office" in Kabul had business cards reading 4-U Enterprises and included an address for a rented postal box in a B.C. convenience store.
