= Attack on the Egyptian Embassy in Pakistan =

1995 militant attack in Islamabad, Pakistan

- Location: Islamabad
- Date: 19 November 1995
- Attack type: Car bombing, Suicide bombing
- Weapon: 2 Car bomb
- Deaths: 17 (including 2 bombers)
- Injuries: ~60
- Perpetrator: Egyptian Islamic Jihad

Carried out by the Egyptian Islamic Jihad, the 19 November 1995 attack on the Egyptian embassy in Islamabad, Pakistan was retaliation against the diplomatic staffers who were accused of gathering intelligence on Jihad factions inside Pakistan. It was the deadliest attack against the Egyptian government, since it had been declared apostate three years earlier by Islamist militants.

== Attack ==
Al-Qaeda leader Ayman al-Zawahiri planned the attack in 1994, shortly after aligning himself with Osama bin Laden, initially hoping to target the Khan el-Khalili marketplace on the same day. Members such as Abu Hafs claimed it was in response to Pakistan's extradition of several al-Jihad members to face imprisonment, torture and sexual abuse in Egypt. Al-Zawahiri later said that the group had wanted to target the American embassy, but it was too heavily fortified.

Two men approached the embassy at approximately 9:30 am and killed its security detail with their guns and grenades. A vehicle described alternately as either a pick-up truck or a small car resembling a taxi loaded with a 250-pound bomb then rushed into the compound. The driver set off the bomb, blowing apart the gates. Three minutes later, a Jeep carrying a second, larger bomb also detonated and a side of the building crumbled. The Japanese and Indonesian embassies were also damaged, as was a nearby bank.

The two bombers, the Second Secretary for the embassy, three Egyptian security guards and 12 others including Pakistani security guards, civilians and as many as four other diplomats were killed in total, and approximately sixty were wounded. A 17th person died in the hospital the following day.

It was the group's first success under Zawahiri's leadership, but Bin Laden had disapproved of the operation. The bombing alienated the host of the embassy, Pakistan, and Pakistan was "the best route into Afghanistan." Zawahiri later referred to the bombings in his autobiographical text.

We had to react to the Egyptian government's expansion of its campaign against Egyptian fundamentalists outside the country. So we decided to target a painful goal for all the parties of this evil alliance. After studying the situation we decided to assign a group to react to this and we assigned their targets, first bombing the American embassy in Islamabad and if that wasn't easy, then one of the American targets in Islamabad. If that didn't work, then the target should be bombing a Western embassy famous for its historic hatred for Muslims, and if not that, then the Egyptian embassy. Our extensive and detailed surveillance found that targeting the American Embassy was beyond the abilities of the assigned group, so we decided to study one of the American targets in Islamabad, and we discovered it has few American employees and most of the victims would be Pakistani. We also discovered that targeting the other Western embassies was beyond the abilities of the assigned group, so we settled on targeting the Egyptian embassy in Islamabad, which was not only running a campaign for chasing Arabs in Pakistan but also spying on the Arab Mujahedeen…later, Pakistani security found in the ruins of the embassy evidence revealing the co-operation between India and Egypt in espionage.

A short time before the bombing of the embassy the assigned group asked our permission. They told us they could strike both the Egyptian and American Embassies if we gave them extra money. We had already provided them with all that we had and we couldn't collect more money. So the group focused on bombing the Egyptian embassy. The rubble of the embassy left a clear message to the Egyptian government.

Al-Sharq Al-Awsat, 3 December 2001

Three groups had all simultaneously taken responsibility for the attack, including al-Jihad, the International Justice Group and the Islamic Holy War group.

Former CIA agent Robert Baer claims that Imad Mughniyah "facilitated the travel" of somebody involved, and that one of his deputies had "provided a stolen Lebanese passport to one of the planners of the bombing".

== Investigation ==
The engine block of the truck used in the bombing was found, with its VIN intact, leading investigators to call on the last registered owner of the vehicle. He told authorities that he had sold the truck to two men, and drew a rough sketch of each of the individuals, who Pakistani authorities claimed to be able to identify; although they would not release their names. It was also noted that of five Afghans scheduled to be working in the Embassy at the time of the attack, only one was present and authorities were "looking for" the other four.

Within days of the bombing, Pakistan announced the arrests of six Egyptians, two Afghans and two Jordanians.

The Canadian Ahmed Khadr was arrested in January, after it was discovered that Khalid Abdullah, believed to have purchased one of the vehicles used in the bombing, had been staying with the Khadr family and was engaged to their eldest daughter Zaynab. Khadr was released in March 1996 based on a lack of evidence indicating he had any involvement.

By December, 16 people had been arrested in connection with the bombing.

In January 1996, Pakistan announced they had arrested Sudanese men Syed Ahmad and Bashir Bahar Qadim in Faisalabad in connection with the attacks.

In October 1998, Tareq Ali Mursi, Jamal Shueib and Eid Abdul Samee Abdulsamee were all captured in South Africa and were the subject of extraordinary renditions back to Egypt where they were accused of participating in the bombing.

In May 1999, Hasan Ahmed Rabi was arrested in Kuwait, and extradited to Egypt where he was accused of involvement with the embassy bombing.

In July 1999, 71 alleged militants, including Isam Shu'ayb and Id Abd al-Mun'im connected to the embassy bombing saw their cases transferred to a military court.

In 2001, Egyptian forces surrounded Khadr's house in Peshawar, and requested that Pakistani ISI forces offer assistance in capturing the man they still believed had knowledge of the embassy bombing in Islamabad. Instead, the ISI contacted the Taliban, who sent a diplomatic car to pick up Khadr and bring him into Afghanistan.

In 2002, Abul-Dahab confessed to Egyptian interrogators that he had funded the attack on orders from bin Laden, and had transferred money from a Californian bank account to Pakistan to finance the attack.

== Consequences ==
Omar Nasiri would later recall when the Afghan training camps heard the news of the attack, and Derunta was filled with every kind of ammunition being fired in the air in celebration.

Pakistani prime minister Benazir Bhutto stated that the attack was not meant to destabilise the country, but send a clear message of retribution for the extradition of Ramzi Yousef. Pakistan immediately expelled Maktab al-Khidamat from their borders, and clamped down on Islamist groups.

While Western diplomats originally warned Pakistan the event was because "they were not doing enough" to combat terrorism, Interior Minister Naseerullah Babar rebuffed the claims pointing out that the attack had occurred because Egypt had extradited ten suspected terrorists.

In her 2004 trial in the United States, Lynne Stewart saw the prosecution introduce newspaper clippings seized from her possession which spoke of the bombing.

== See also ==
- List of terrorist incidents, 1995
