= East Turkistan Organization =

Uyghur separatist group

The East Turkistan Organization is a name for a Uyghur separatist group. According to Ludmila Kondrashova, a Russian historian, the organization has a militant wing. She reported that the organization had 51 branches outside of China: 19 in central Asia, 14 in West Asia and 18 in Europe. She reported that the organization is funded by the drug trade, and by donations from other organizations hostile to China. She asserted more than 200 Uyghurs received military training in Afghan training camps run by al Qaeda.
