= Tareq Ali Mursi =

Tareq Ali Mursi was an alleged member of Egyptian Islamic Jihad. He was the subject of an extraordinary rendition from South Africa to face trial in Egypt.

In November, lawyers Montasser al-Zayat and Mahmoud Abdul Shafi unsuccessfully argued that he should be released, as there had been no demonstration he had any relationship with the other two men transferred from South Africa, Jamal Shueib and Eid Abdul Samee Abdulsamee, who were accused of participating in the 1995 Attack on the Egyptian Embassy in Pakistan.

In July 1999, he was one of 71 alleged militants connected to the embassy bombing who saw their cases transferred to a military court.

On August 5, 2004, he was interviewed by Hani al-Sibai over the telephone.
