= Integrated National Security Enforcement Teams =

Canadian counterterrorist law enforcement units

Integrated National Security Enforcement Teams (INSET; French: Équipes intégrées de la sécurité nationale, EISN) are Canadian counterterrorist, counter-foreign interference, and counter-espionage units operating under the auspices of Public Safety Canada. These federal investigative teams were formed in 2002 in response to the September 11 attacks.

Canadian provinces will have National Security Enforcement Sections (NSES) instead of an INSET in places that do not have a large city.

== Organization ==
INSET units are made up of personnel from the Royal Canadian Mounted Police (RCMP), Canada Border Services Agency (CBSA), Canadian Security Intelligence Service (CSIS), and police forces at the municipal and provincial levels. These units are tasked with investigating criminal national security matters domestically and internationally.

INSET units are known to operate in and around Toronto, Vancouver, Ottawa, Montreal, and Edmonton.

=== Mandate ===
The mandate of INSET units is as follows:

1. Increase the capacity to collect, share and analyze intelligence among partners, with respect to targets (individuals) that are a threat to national security.
2. To create an enhanced enforcement capacity to bring such targets to justice.
3. Enhance partner agencies' collective ability to combat national security threats and meet specific mandate responsibilities.

== History ==
INSET units were established in 2002 after the September 11 attacks. Toronto, Montreal, Ottawa, and Vancouver NSES units were changed to be INSETs in response to the attacks.

An INSET unit operating in Toronto played a major role in the capture of 17 terror suspects on June 2, 2006. In 2012, INSETs were tasked to secure Albertan energy infrastructure from all attacks.

On May 6, 2022, the RCMP announced that an INSET unit arrested an unnamed individual with officers from the Ontario Provincial Police Provincial Anti-Terrorism Section (OPP PATS) and the Windsor Police Service for contributing to terrorist activity.

In April 2022, several unnamed RCMP officers resigned from an INSET unit after they were ordered to arrest a suspect by the Canadian Security Intelligence Service without being told why.

On January 24, 2024, the Edmonton Police Service (EPS) is reportedly investigating a shooting incident at Edmonton City Hall concerning a Canadian Corps of Commissionaires (CCC) employee named Bezhani Sarvar alongside an INSET unit.

During July 2025 an investigation led by INSET let to arrest of four individuals, including an active member of the Canadian military, who were planning to create an anti-government militia.

== See also ==
- Konrad Shourie
