= Human Concern International =

Canadian relief and development organization

Human Concern International (HCI) is a Canadian federally registered charitable non-governmental organization (NGO) working in international development and emergency relief assistance since 1980.

== History ==
Since 1980 HCI has contributed over $110 million towards facilitating Sustainable Development through long-term development projects, and maintaining Human Dignity by providing immediate relief assistance to many poor and strife torn countries and to local causes in Canada. HCI's development projects have helped communities become more self-sufficient and the emergency assistance provided has helped communities during dire need. We have provided financial assistance Health Care, Agriculture, Human Resources Development, Relief and Public Education.

Around the globe they have sponsored over 2000 children. For $30 a month, they have provided medical, educational and other basic needs to children up to the age of 16 years. In Canada they have assisted during the Manitoba floods, ice storm in Eastern Canada and Quebec and with the B.C. inferno victims, provided food, clothing, shelter, medical services and educational services to the needy and homeless.

== Countries of operation ==
Afghanistan

- Girls School in Farm Hada, Jalalabad;
- Relief and Rehabilitation Projects

Bangladesh

- Relief Assistance;
- Rehabilitation & Resettlement Projects

Egypt

- Mobile Clinics

Guyana

- Relief Assistance Programs;
- Health and Education Projects;
- Women Empowerment Projects

Horn of Africa

- Water, Agriculture and Medical Aid;
- Emergency Relief;
- School Rehabilitation and Reconstruction;
- Skills Training and Livelihood Programs

India

- Health and Education Projects;
- Capacity Building and Training Programs

Indonesia

- Infrastructure Rehabilitation and Reconstruction Projects;
- Micro-enterprise and Micro-credit Programs;
- School Sponsorship and Scholarship Programs;
- Skills Training Programs

Iraq

- Relief Assistance;
- Capacity Building Activities;
- Support to Disabled People

Lebanon

- Landmines Dangers Awareness Programs;
- Micro-Credit and Livelihood Programs;
- Relief and Rehabilitation Programs

Kashmir

- Relief Assistance Programs;
- Medical Hospital and Mobile Health Clinic;
- Housing and Sanitation Projects;
- Schools (up to grade 8);
- Skills Training Programs

Palestine

- Organic Olive Oil Production Project;
- Relief Assistance;
- School Bags and School Sponsorship Programs;
- Kindergarten Development Programs

Pakistan

- Hope Village Complex - facilities include:
- Mother-Child and Family Health Center;
- Mental Health and Trauma Counseling Center;
- Vocational Training;
- Micro-enterprise for women and men;
- School (up to grade 12 and hostel for orphans);
- General Hospital and Education Centers;
- Women's Center;
- Skills Training and Professional Development Programs

Sri Lanka

- Relief Assistance;
- Education Program;
- Women Empowerment Projects

Canada

- Public Education and Awareness Raising Programs;
- Training and Scholarship Programs;
- Support to Hospitals, Food Banks and Women's Shelters;
- Financial Assistance to the Needy;
- Scholarship Program

Regional operation

- Child Sponsorship Program in Afghanistan, Bangladesh, Bosnia, Guyana, Kashmir, Lebanon, Palestine, Pakistan, Somalia & Sudan;
- Higher Education and Learning Program (HELP);
- Medical Aid Packages;
- Human Resource Development;
- Ramadan and Zabiha (Meat as Food) Programs

== Programs ==
Agriculture

- Agro-chemical Projects
- Field Crop Projects
- Irrigation Systems
- Water Resource Projects including Artesian Wells, Tube Wells and Canals

Child Sponsorship Program

Economic Development

- Entrepreneurship Development
- Vocational Training
- Micro-Credit
- Livelihood Development
- Financial Assistance
- Income Generating Activities

Financial assistance

- For medical, education and other basic needs of children newborn to 16 years.

Healthcare

- Rural Clinics
- General Hospitals
- Dental Clinics
- Mother and Child Health Care Centres
- Mobile Clinics
- Immunization Programs
- Trauma Counseling Centers
- Training of Teachers and Health Professionals as Mental Health Therapists

Human Resources Development

- Teachers' Training Centres
- Higher Education and Literacy Program (HELP)
- Nursing colleges
- Primary and Middle Schools
- Vocational and Skill Training Centres
- Income Generating Projects with Work Production Centres
- Micro-enterprise Schemes (Small Scale Livelihood Projects)
- Community Credit Programs

Relief

- Medical Aid Packages
- Emergency Food Distribution
- Shipment of Basic Necessities
- Financial Assistance
- Family Assistance Program
- Zabiha Project
- Ramadan Programs and Zakat Fund

Public Education

- Information to general public & communities
- Public Education in Health matters
- Videos, Special Reports, Newsletters, Pamphlets and Flyers
- Public Speaking Activities

Higher Education and Learning Program (HELP)

HELP was launched in 2001 to address a crucial problem; needs in higher education and skills learning, in many developing countries. It facilitates sustainable social and personal development while promoting higher education.

HELP has two segments, built around the needs of youth in under-privileged countries. Higher Education will target those who have the will and merit to continue their studies but cannot afford the tuition fees and other related expenses. The Learning Program aims at providing vocational training to young people in fields compatible with the region's demands to help them acquire skills to earn their living and achieve financial independent.

The three primary areas in which HCI carried on programs to achieve its charitable purposes during the fiscal period ending 2009-03-31 are: 65% literacy/education/training programs; 17% disaster/war relief; 10% infrastructure development.

== Notable individuals associated ==
=== Youth ambassadors ===
- Renad Attallah

== Financial Arrangements ==
The total expenditures of HCI on activities, programs and projects carried on outside Canada during the fiscal period ending 2009-03-31, excluding gifts to qualified donees, is 7,892,935 Canadian dollars. HCI's total expenditure on all compensation during the fiscal period ending 2009-03-31 is 194,639 Canadian dollars. HCI exported medical supplies during the fiscal period ending 2009-03-31 as part of its charitable programs valued 5,344,797 Canadian dollars.

== Controversies ==
HCI reportedly began in 1979 to support the people in Afghanistan. Dedicated to feeding and schooling orphans, the organisation co-sponsored a Human Rights day at Pennsylvania State University in 1986.

Ahmed Khadr headed HCI's Pakistan office until his arrest in 1995 for that bombing of the Egyptian Embassy in Pakistan that was allegedly carried out with HCI funds. Under his leadership, the Hope Village Orphanage was created in Akora Khattak.

HCI denies its own involvement and describes Khadr as a volunteer from 1988 to 1995, working in Pakistan and Afghanistan on relief and development projects.

In 1996, the Pakistani press accused HCI's Peshawar office of being made up of Al-Gama’a al-Islamiyya members, who supported the overthrow of the secular Egyptian government in favour of a Sharia state.

Canada cut off government financing in 1997 to HCI. As of 2000 the group was being investigated by the United States. In 1999, the group filed an application for judicial review of a decision by the Canadian International Development Agency (CIDA) to refuse funding the organization's activities. It claimed it was being discriminated against by Canadian government officials. The group maintains its registration in Canada (BN/Registration Number: 107497125RR0001). In 2003, Richard A. Clarke testified before the U.S. Congress that HCI "reportedly received at least $250,000 in funding from the Canadian government."

An organization based in the U.S. and named Human Concern International was one of ten Islamic charities noted by Spanish police in 2002 for allegedly financing Algerian Muslim rebels.

HCI reported that it is not the organization referred to in these allegations and that it has offices only in Canada, Lebanon, Pakistan and Guyana. The Security Intelligence Review Committee recommended Canadian Security Intelligence Service to retract the statement and apologize to the group.

== Apology from the National Post ==
The National Post apologized, on April 26, 2004, for a March 6, 2004 editorial. The apology said, in part:

"The National Post has no reason to believe that there is evidence of any misuse of HCI funds to support terrorism. HCI itself has never been accused of terrorism or of supporting terrorism. The Post has no reason to believe that any of its other volunteers or staff have been accused of terrorism or of supporting terrorism.

"Incorrect information appeared in an editorial in the National Post of March 6. The National Post apologizes to HCI, its board of directors, volunteers and donors for any harm or embarrassment its errors may have caused."

== Arrest of then-regional head of Human Concern International Pakistan ==
In July 2019, the Counter-Terrorism Department arrested Ali Nawaz, the then-regional head of Human Concern International Pakistan, on the terror financing charge under the Anti-Terrorism Act, accusing him of diverting charity funds to Al Qaeda.

On June 15, 2020, the anti-terrorism court acquitted Ali Nawaz and five other officials who were charged by the counter terrorism department with terror financing. Judge Tariq Khan Yousafzai pronounced the acquittal of the accused before the conclusion of trial by accepting their application filed under Section 265-K of the Code of Criminal Procedure (CrPC). The provision empowers the trial court to acquit an accused at any stage of the trial if there is no probability of his/her conviction on the basis of available evidence.

The allegations were never against Human Concern International, and as such HCI continues to work in Pakistan, and in fact recently had their status as an INGO renewed in March 2020.
