= Richard Mosley =

Canadian judge

Judge of the Federal Court of Canada
- In office November 4, 2003 – May 9, 2024

Personal details
- Born: May 9, 1949 (age 77) Sault Ste. Marie, Ontario
- Spouse: Lorraine (née Touchette)
- Education: University of Ottawa

Richard Mosley (born May 9, 1949) is a Canadian retired Federal Court trial judge, who has a background in National security interests, and has taken a role in hearing a number of Canadian anti-terrorism cases, including those relating to Abdullah and Omar Khadr, as well as Hassan Almrei. He has also taken a role in hearing the case of Jeremy Hinzman. In 2024, Mosley ruled that the federal government's invocation of the Emergencies Act to end the 2022 convoy protest was "not justified". He stepped down from the bench on May 9, 2024.
