= Konrad Shourie =

Canadian police officer

Sgt. Konrad Lionel Shourie is a Royal Canadian Mounted Police (RCMP) officer assigned to the Integrated National Security Enforcement Teams.

On December 5, 2002, while attached to the Oshawa RCMP branch, he was one of three Canadian police officers awarded the Medal of Bravery for their role in the UN rescue of civilians and police officers during a Kosovo riot in the Mitrovica district.

Shourie has taken a lead role in monitoring members of the Khadr family. Shourie was part of the team that seized Zaynab Khadr's papers, tapes and laptop, when she returned to Canada on February 14, 2005. He also oversaw the December 4 interview of Abdullah Khadr by American FBI agents.

When the original 90-day warrant for the seizure of Zaynab's papers expired it was Shourie who penned a request for a one-year extension.
