= Khalid Abdullah (Egyptian) =

Egyptian criminal

Khalid Abdullah (Arabic: خالد عبد الله) is a Sudanese-Egyptian who was the fiancé of Canadian Zaynab Khadr, and a suspect in the 1996 attack on the Egyptian Embassy in Pakistan.

In July 1995, Ahmed Khadr arranged for his 15-year-old daughter Zaynab to marry Abdullah in December. Her mother Maha el-Samnah began preparing an apartment for the couple in the family's house, and Abdullah lived with the family for two months, "like a trial engagement".

Abdullah was 26 at the time of the bombing, and was believed to have purchased one of the trucks used in the attack. He fled to Lahore after the attack, and disappeared.

He re-surfaced in Tehran in October 1997, and contacted the Khadr family to try to reschedule the wedding he had missed. Ahmed agreed to bring his family on a long vacation culminating in the city for a farewell to the reluctant Zaynab as she started a new life with Abdullah.

Six months after the couple began living in a rented Tehran apartment, Abdullah phoned his father-in-law to report that Zaynab was inconsolable at being separated from her family, and the marriage wasn't working out. She returned to live with her family.

In 1999, he was arrested in Pakistan, and was one of hundreds extradited to the Egyptian "Returnees from Albania" tribunal. He was sentenced to a lengthy prison term.
