= Shahgai =

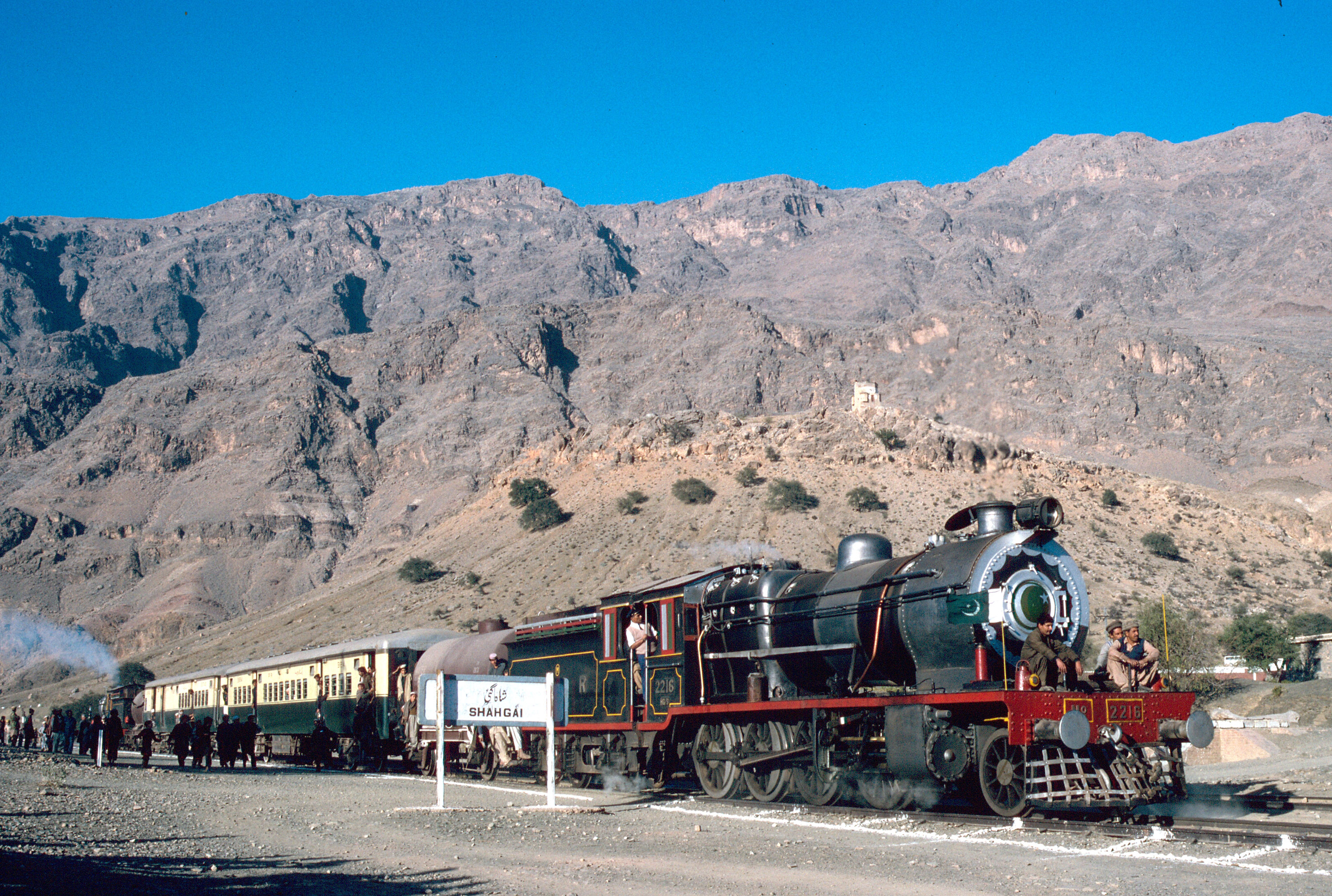
- Shahgai railway station

- Location within FATA Location within Pakistan
- Coordinates: 34°01′02″N 71°16′48″E
- Country: Pakistan
- Region: Federally Administered Tribal Areas
- District: Khyber Agency
- Tehsil: Jamrud

Population (2017)
  - Total: 2,744

Shahgai is a region in Pakistan's Federally Administered Tribal Areas. It was merged into Khyber Pakhtunkhwa in 2018.

A fortress was built by British forces in 1927 to oversee the Khyber Pass and house the Khyber Rifles. It still stands today and is used by the Pakistan Army.

Between 2002 and 2003, Canadian Ahmed Khadr was asked to organise militants operating near the border of Shahgai, and he subsequently asked his son Abdullah and Hamza al-Jowfi to help him procure weapons. He clashed with Abdul Hadi al-Iraqi, arguing that guerrilla tactics would prove more useful than frontline battle.

Pakistani forces shelled the village in September 2008.
