= Son of al Qaeda =

- Country of origin: Canada

Original release
- Release: April 22, 2004

Son of al Qaeda is a documentary about Abdurahman Khadr, a young Canadian whose father was an associate of Osama bin Laden, produced by Terence McKenna and Nazim Baksh. Abdurahman's younger brother is Omar Khadr, who was also detained at Guantanamo.

It was first broadcast on the CBC's The Fifth Estate in the winter of 2004. It was later picked up and broadcast on PBS as part of the Frontline series.

The documentary describes how Khadr's father moved his family into Nazim Jihad when Khadr was ten or eleven years old. Khadr's parents described him as the "black sheep" of his family, because he was not as compliant as his siblings in adopting jihadist values. He ran away from the military training camps they sent him to. And when the Americans invaded Afghanistan, he was completely and fully cooperative.

The members of the Khadr family give personal stories about Osama bin Laden in their interviews. They claim that Bin Laden enjoyed playing volleyball and that he prohibited his family and followers from using most modern conveniences.
