= Dennis Edney =

Canadian lawyer (1946–2023)

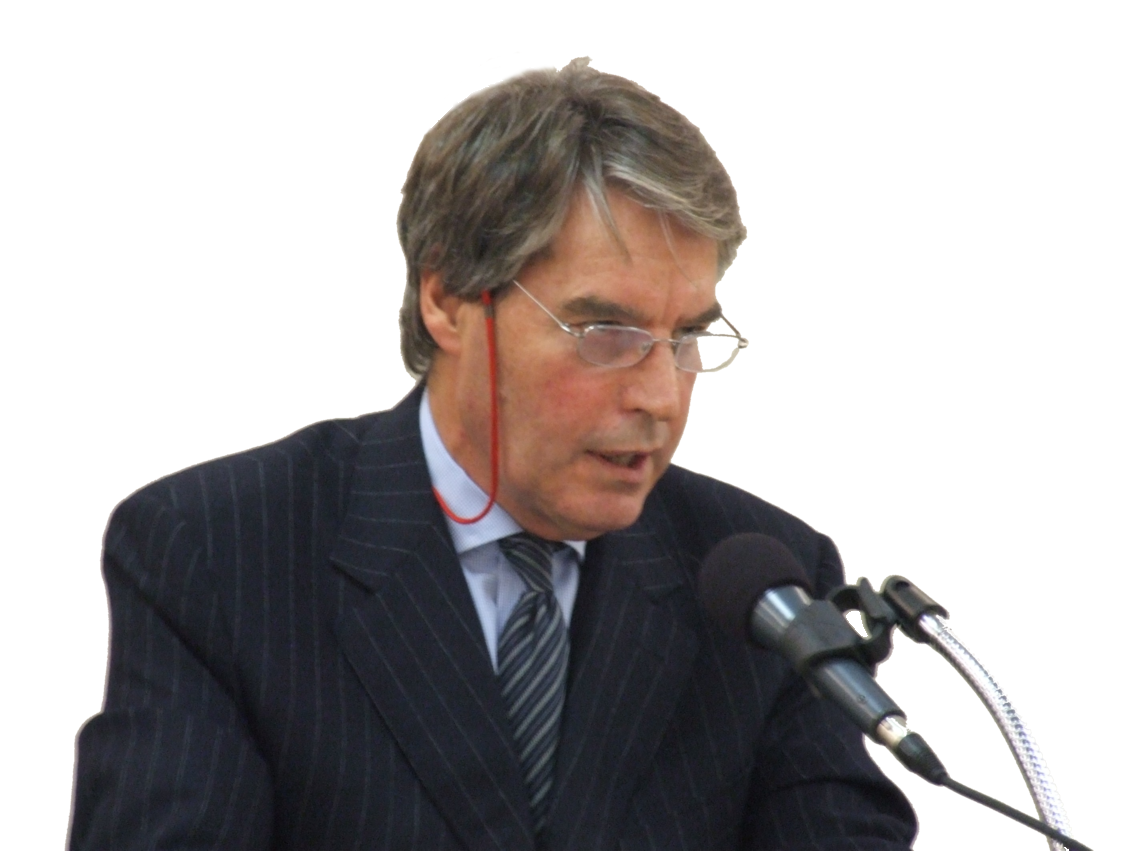
- Edney in 2007
- Born: 19 December 1946; Dundee, Scotland
- Died: 30 December 2023 (aged 77)
- Occupation: Defence lawyer

Dennis Edney (19 December 1946 – 30 December 2023) was a Scottish-Canadian defence lawyer based in Edmonton, Alberta, Canada. Originally from Scotland, he was noted for his involvement in high-profile cases, including Brian Mills, R. v. Trang, as defence attorney for Abdullah and Omar Khadr, who were captured in the war on terror, for Fahim Ahmad, and for representing the entire Khadr family. He also represented Canadian Abdulrahman El Bahnasawy charged in the US with plotting to carry out mass shootings of civilians at concerts, to bomb New York Times Square, and to bomb the city's subway system.

== Early life and education ==
Dennis Edney was born in Dundee, Scotland on 19 December 1946. He worked as a building contractor after immigrating to Canada.

Edney received his law degree in 1987 from the University of Northumbria and has since appeared at all levels of court, including the Supreme Court of Canada and the United States Supreme Court. He was appointed Foreign Attorney Consultant by the U.S. Pentagon to participate in the legal defence of Omar Khadr, at Guantanamo Bay Naval Base, Cuba.

== Career ==
Edney lectured extensively, with emphasis on the Rule of Law, to organizations, universities and conferences throughout North America. He served as keynote speaker on behalf of Amnesty International at Trinity College, Dublin, on the Rule of Law (2005); and in London, England, at the international conference on the "Global Struggle against Torture" (2005).

On 25 September 2007, Edney appeared on the CBC Radio program As It Happens, where he claimed politics were responsible for the Crown's sudden reversal of process, abandoning the preliminary inquiry, for the Toronto terrorism trial. He was one of the defence attorneys supporting the publication ban on information about the trial, while others decried it.

In 2008 he received the Canadian National Pro Bono Award: "The significance of his commitment is based not only on the tremendous energy, time and personal resources spent advocating on Mr. Khadr’s behalf, but also based on the complexity of the litigation, which was argued before Canadian and U.S. courts and military tribunals. His commitment in the face of potential personal repercussions of representing an unpopular case is a testament to the finest traditions of the legal profession. The fruits of [his] labour have not only increased access to justice for one individual but impacted human rights the world over."

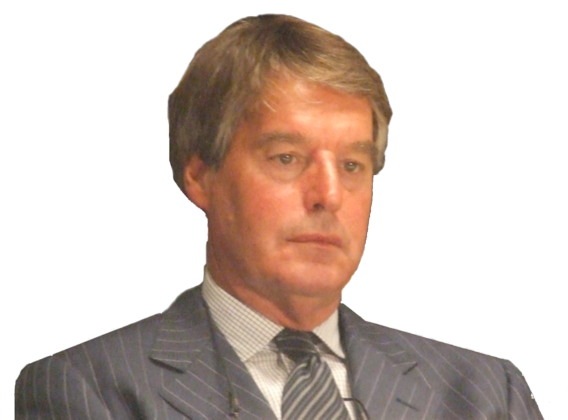
Edney in 2008

Edney was named by Alberta Venture magazine as one of 50 Alberta's most influential people for 2008. He received the 2009 Human Rights Medal awarded by the Lieutenant Governor of British Columbia for work that "has helped to promote and further human rights".

In 2011, he was appointed a Bencher of the Law Society of Alberta. He also received the honorary title of Queens Counsel for exceptional merit and contribution to the legal profession.

On 10 December 2013, the 65th anniversary of the Universal Declaration of Human Rights, he was recognized by the John Humphrey Centre for Peace and Human Rights in Edmonton.

In addition to his caseload, he is noted for speaking publicly at conferences and engagements on legal matters, including the rule of law as it relates to the war on terror.

On 19 September 2014, when the Canadian Museum for Human Rights, in Winnipeg, was first opened, Edney participated in a human rights panel about Omar Khadr's case at the nearby Manitoba Children’s Theatre. Edney was also presented with an award for his work from the Winnipeg Peace Alliance.

Dennis Edney and Patricia Edney star in the 2015 Canadian documentary Guantanamo's Child: Omar Khadr, which looks at Edney's advocacy for Omar Khadr and features interviews in Edney's home, where Khadr resided as a guest after being released on bail in 2015.

Edney died of complications from dementia on 30 December 2023, at the age of 77.
