= Mujahideen Shura (North Waziristan) =

The Mujahideen Shura was a council set up by jihadist groups such as the Pakistani Taliban in North Waziristan, Pakistan. Members were said to include Hafiz Gul Bahadur, Maulana Sadiq Noor, Jalaluddin Haqqani of the Afghan Taliban, and Tahir Yuldashev, commander of the Islamic Movement of Uzbekistan.
