= Khaled Abu al-Dahab =

Member of al-Qaeda

Khaled Abu Al Dahab
- Citizenship: Egypt
- Organization: Al- Qaeda

An Egyptian medical student, Khaled Abu al-Dahab (Abul-Dahab) was arrested and convicted of terrorism. He is alleged to have been a right-hand man to Ali Mohamed, who had been an American Special Forces soldier.

Ali Mohamed travelled north from California with al-Dahab, who later told Egyptian interrogators he had withdrawn US$3,000 from a Californian bank account on orders of Osama bin Laden himself, to offer as bail money to lawyer Phil Rankin. The pair hoped to have Essam Marzouk released and possibly smuggle him into the United States.

In 2002, Abul-Dahab confessed to Egyptian interrogators that he had funded the 1995 attack on the Egyptian Embassy in Pakistan on orders from bin Laden, and had transferred money from a Californian bank account to Pakistan to finance the attack.

In 2017, he was stripped of US citizenship.
