= Khadr family =

Arab-Canadian family noted for their ties to Osama bin Laden and al-Qaeda

The Khadr family (Arabic: أسرة خضر) is an Egyptian-Canadian family noted for their ties to Osama bin Laden and connections to al-Qaeda.

== Members ==
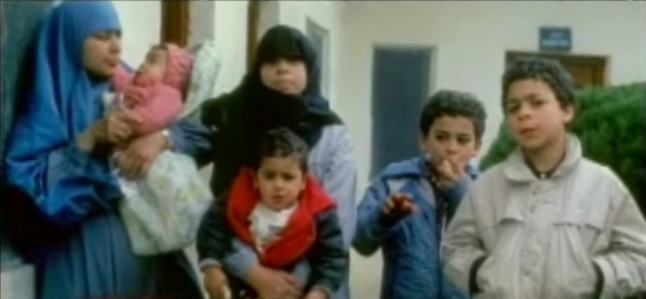
Maha (youngest daughter in arms), Zaynab (Abdulkareem in arms), Abdurahman and Abdullah

The Khadr family is composed of:

- Ahmed Khadr (1948–2003), father, an Egyptian-Canadian, killed in 2003, possibly by Pakistani security forces;
- Maha el-Samnah (born 1957), mother, a Palestinian-Canadian;
- Their children:
  - Zaynab Khadr (born 1979 in Ottawa), daughter; she now lives in Sudan with her fourth husband and four children.
  - Abdullah Khadr (born 1981 in Ottawa), son arrested in Canada in 2005 and held for five years while an extradition request from US was reviewed. Ontario Superior Court ordered him released in 2010;
  - Abdurahman Khadr (born 1982), son;
  - Ibrahim Khadr (1985–1988), a son who died of congenital heart defect;
  - Omar Khadr (born 1986), son captured by American forces following a 2002 firefight and held in Guantanamo Bay from 2002 to 2012;
  - Abdulkareem Khadr (born 1989), son, became paralyzed in the attack where his father died.
  - A daughter (born 1991).

=== Zaynab Khadr ===
Zaynab Khadr زينب خضر
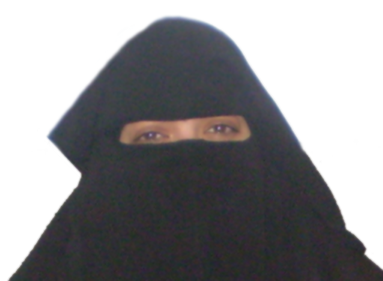
- Zaynab Khadr (?) in 2008
- Born: Zaynab Ahmed Said Khadr; 1979 (age 46–47); Ottawa, Ontario, Canada
- Spouse(s): 1. Khalid Abdullah, m. 1997-divorced 1998; 2. Yacoub al-Bahr, m. 1999-divorced 2002; 3. Joshua Boyle, m. 2009-divorced 2010; 4. unknown, post-2012, 2 more children
- Children: Safia Khadr, 2 others
- Parent(s): Ahmed Khadr; Maha el-Samnah

Zaynab Ahmed Said Khadr (Arabic: زينب أحمد سعيد خضر; born 1979) is the eldest daughter and first child of Ahmed Khadr, an Egyptian immigrant to Canada noted for being a terrorist and senior al-Qaeda member. Two of her younger brothers, Abdurahman and Omar, were held by the United States as enemy combatants in the Guantanamo Bay detention camp after being captured in Afghanistan in 2002.

With her family, she grew up in Pakistan and Canada, as they frequently traveled back and forth. Following a severe 1992 injury that left her father disabled, Zaynab became a "second mother" to the younger children of the family. She was married and divorced three times, and has a daughter from her second marriage.

She and her widowed mother returned to Canada in February 2005. Khadr has since fought for the family members' legal rights to remain there. She has also worked for justice for her brothers. Abdullah Khadr was detained in Pakistan and resisted extradition to the United States; he finally returned to Canada in 2005. Abdurahman Khadr was also detained, but he had claimed to have been working for the United States CIA when he was held as a detainee in Guantanamo Bay detention camp, 2002–2003. In October 2010, her youngest brother Omar Khadr pleaded guilty to charges in a plea agreement, and was repatriated to Canada in 2012 to serve the rest of his eight-year sentence.

On January 31, 2016, Michelle Shephard and Peter Edwards, writing in the Toronto Star, reported that Zaynab had been apprehended, in Turkey for a visa violation.

In August 2017, it was reported that she lived in Sudan with her husband and four children, but by December 2018 she had moved to Georgia.

==== Early life and education ====
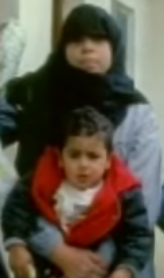
The 12-year-old Zaynab with her brother Abdulkareem in arms

Zaynab Khadr was born in Ottawa, Ontario in 1979, the eldest daughter and first child of Maha el-Samnah and Ahmed Khadr, Egyptian-Canadian citizens. Her father was in graduate school.

The family moved to Pakistan in 1985, where her father worked for charities assisting Afghan refugees after the Soviet invasion of Afghanistan. The children went to school there and were also home schooled by their mother. Zaynab has five younger brothers: Abdullah, Abdurahman, Abdulkareem (known as Kareem), Ismail (died), and Omar, and a younger sister.

In July 1995, her father arranged for the 15-year-old Zaynab to marry Khalid Abdullah, an Egyptian, in December. Her mother began preparing an apartment for the couple in the family's house in Pakistan.

On November 19, 1995, Ayman al-Zawahiri bombed the Egyptian Embassy in Pakistan. Named as one of the conspirators, Zaynab's fiancé Abdullah went into hiding. When police arrived eight days later to arrest her father on suspicion of involvement, Zaynab grabbed his rifle and screamed at them, while her mother barricaded the door.

Zaynab later recalled having celebrated the engagement of her friend Umayma al-Zawahiri at the girl's family house in an all-day party. Umayma's father, al-Zawahiri, had knocked at Umayma's door to ask the two girls to keep their singing and partying quiet as it was nighttime.

==== Marriage and family ====
In October 1997, Khalid Abdullah re-surfaced in Tehran and contacted the Khadr family to reschedule his wedding with Zaynab. Khadr agreed to take his family on a long vacation, which they ended in Iran. They said farewell to Zaynab, by then reluctant, as she started a new life with Abdullah. Six months after the couple began living in a rented Tehran apartment, Abdullah phoned his father-in-law to report that Zaynab was inconsolable at being separated from her family. The marriage was not working out, and Zaynab returned to live with her family.

In 1999, Zaynab was introduced to Yacoub al-Bahr, a Yemeni who had fought in Bosnia. He was better-known as a wedding singer in Kabul, Afghanistan. Her father asked the boys of the family to vote on whether he should give his consent to the marriage, and did so after Abdurahman and Kareem voiced their enthusiasm; the younger Abdullah and Omar abstained. The wedding was in Kabul. Both al-Zawahiri and Osama bin Laden attended. Zaynab later explained that nobody was individually invited, and that word of mouth informed interested parties about the open invitation to their upcoming wedding. The couple moved into a separate wing of the Khadr household.

The following year, Zaynab and her mother returned to Canada for several months late in her pregnancy, where she gave birth to a daughter, named Safia. After returning to Afghanistan and introducing her new child to Rabiyah Hutchinson, Zaynab was advised to take her daughter to a doctor. Safia was diagnosed with hydrocephalus and required surgery, which Zaynab decided would be better performed at a Canadian hospital. Her husband disagreed, and insisted that a hospital in Lahore would be just as effective. When Zaynab insisted on taking her daughter to Canada, al-Bahr separated from her and left the household permanently.

In late 2001, Ahmed Khadr encountered al-Bahr in Kabul; he advised him that he should either return to his wife and daughter, or consent to a divorce. After receiving written reassurance from Zaynab that she would not seek any form of restitution, al-Bahr agreed to a formal divorce.

==== Life in post-invasion Afghanistan ====
In January 2002, Zaynab took Safia and Abdulkareem to Lahore for a stay at the hospital, where her daughter needed medical attention. Her brother Abdullah later joined them, since he required surgery to remove cartilage from his nose.

He disappeared later that year, as did their younger brother Omar, not yet 16; she learned later that they were both being detained by the United States as enemy combatants at the Guantanamo Bay detention camp.

In 2003, Zaynab, her daughter and her mother stayed at a house in Birmal, Pakistan for two days, before their hosts grew wary of American jets overhead. They moved further into the mountains of Waziristan. Her father was killed in October 2003. Zaynab moved to Islamabad, where she lived for some time in a rented apartment with her daughter and younger sister.

In her book Wanted Women Deborah Scroggins describes meeting Zaynab while she was a house-guest of Khalid Khawaja, in Islamabad, Pakistan, in 2004. According to Scroggins, Zaynab told her that the time she lived under the Taliban was "the best five years of my life."

==== Return to Canada ====
Although her passport had been revoked by the Canadian High Commission in Pakistan after her father was alleged to be a terrorist, Khadr returned to Canada on February 17, 2005 to be with her mother, and help the legal defence teams of her brothers Abdullah and Omar. Zaynab and her widowed mother Maha are both on passport "control" lists, meaning they will no longer be issued Canadian passports. This is due to the frequency with which they have reported losing their passports since 1999.

When Zaynab returned to Canada, security officials, including Konrad Shourie, met her at the airport bearing a search warrant. It was based on the statement that she "has willingly participated and contributed both directly and indirectly towards enhancing the ability of Al Qaeda." They seized her laptop, DVDs, audiocassettes, diary and other files. The security officials said that, through the computer files, they were able to determine the present locations of multiple al-Qaeda veterans, though they had no evidence to charge her. Zaynab said she had purchased the computer second-hand seven months before her trip. On June 18, 2005, after the expiry of the three-month limit on holding the items, the court granted the RCMP a one-year extension.

On October 5, 2009, Isabel Teotonio, writing in the Toronto Star, reported on the extradition hearing for Zaynab's brother Abdullah Khadr. She wrote that Canadian officials had seized a hard drive from Zaynab that had belonged to her father. Although Zaynab has indicated a desire to one day return to Pakistan, her Canadian passport remained withheld, for many years, rendering her unable to leave the country. According to Mark Steyn, after the death of Osama bin Laden, Zaynab Khadr was "disconsolate at the death of Osama, and has adopted his mugshot as the photo for her Facebook page."

==== Apprehension in Turkey ====
According to a January 2016 report from Michelle Shephard and Peter Edwards, in the Toronto Star, Zaynab left Canada, for Turkey, in 2012, shortly after her brother Omar was returned to Canada, to finish out his sentence. They reported that she married again, for a fourth time, and bore two more children.

They reported that they had learned she was being held in Turkey. They noted that Turkey had been criticized by human rights workers for holding tens of thousands of individuals, without charge. They noted that they didn't know why she was being held, whether it was over a criminal concern, or an immigration matter; and they didn't know whether she had been formally charged, or was being held in extrajudicial detention. It was subsequently reported that her detention was due to a visa violation.

The National Post reported Turkish diplomats, in Ottawa, would not comment on her case.

After her release, Khadr moved to Sudan where she lived with her fourth husband and four children, before moving again to Georgia.

==== Advocacy ====
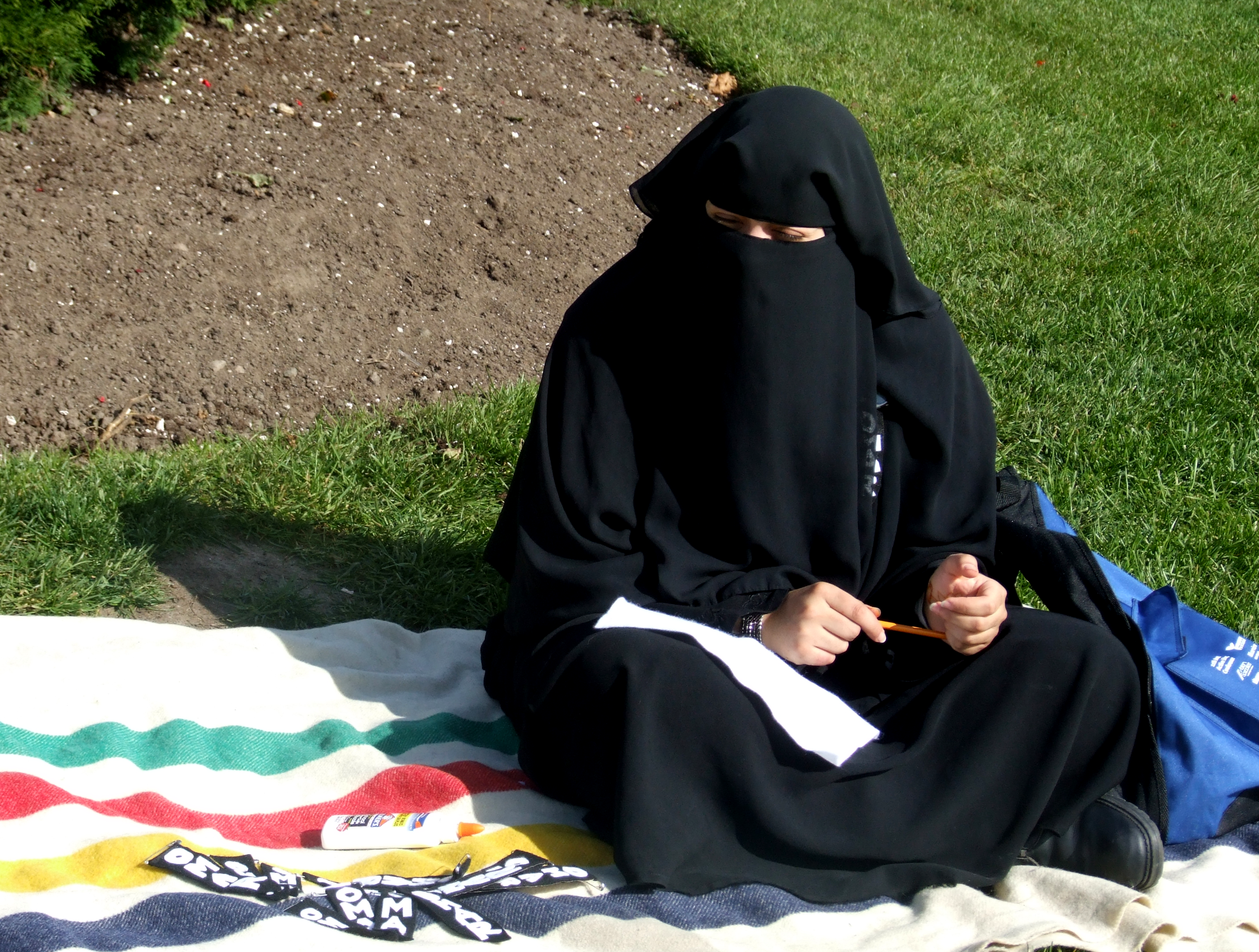
Khadr (?) at Parliament Hill handing out badges reading "OMAR" to passersby in 2008

In 2004, Zaynab appeared in a PBS Frontline documentary entitled Son of al Qaeda, during which she said concerning the September 11th attacks:

"We don't like seeing people killed... [a]t the same time, when you're seeing your people being killed and killed and killed, everyday, everyday, everyday, and then you see whoever is doing this... being killed, you don't want to feel happy. But you just sort of think, "They deserve it. They've been doing it for such a long time, why shouldn't they feel it once in a while?"

Most news stories reported only that she had supported the attacks, mobilizing public sentiment against the family. Zaynab has worked to arrange legal support for other Canadians accused of militant actions in the war on terror, notably attending the bail hearings and preliminaries for the men and youths arrested in Toronto in 2006. Her presence has caused a stir in the media, while she maintains that many of the accused were friends of the family.

In July 2008 clips from secret surveillance recordings at Guantanamo of Omar's first visit from Canadian officials were made public. The clips stirred controversy, as they showed Omar being pleased, when he thought he was finally going to get help from Canadian officials; and they showed him weeping uncontrollably when he realized these Canadian officials were security officials, interested only in helping the CIA utilize him as an intelligence source against the Al-Qaeda terrorist network. Global TV interviewed Zaynab and her mother who described being "devastated" by Omar's distress.

In October 2008, Zaynab began an 18-day hunger strike on Parliament Hill, where she hoped to draw attention to the government's inaction in bringing her brother Abdurahman back to face trial in Canada.

Her brother Omar Khadr was released to Canadian custody at the end of 2012. In 2014, he was moved to a medium-security prison and released in May 2015. On July 4, 2017, an unnamed government source leaked that the Canadian government would apologize and pay $10.5 million in compensation to Khadr. The decision of Justin Trudeau's Liberal government to award Omar Khadr, an alleged former member of Al-Qaeda convicted of murder (notably, as a minor), with these funds has been highly controversial in the country, igniting resentment and outrage in a segment of the Canadian population.

== Location ==
Ahmed Khadr went to college in Canada, where he met and married Maha el-Samnah. They moved to Pakistan in 1985 to work with Afghan refugees following the Soviet invasion of Afghanistan in the 1980s.

In 1992, the family returned to Canada and lived near Bloor/Dundas following an incident in Afghanistan that left the father Ahmed disabled and needing rehabilitation. The family later left and returned to Pakistan. In 1995, Ahmed Khadr was arrested on suspicion of being involved in the bombing of the Egyptian embassy in Pakistan, but was later released.

During this time, the family stayed at Nazim Jihad, the home of Osama bin Laden in Jalalabad, Afghanistan. They stayed at the compound the following year during the father's absence. The family claims they stayed two days, while the FBI maintains they stayed for a month.

The family subsequently moved to the Karte Parwan neighbourhood of Kabul and lived there from 1999–2001. The Khadrs were registered as operators of a Canadian charity, and eventually did their work out of their home.

Following the Invasion of Afghanistan in October 2001, the family joined a convoy leaving Kabul to travel towards Gardez. They later discovered that their intended residence had been bombed.

The family then traveled to an orphanage that Ahmed Khadr had run. They eventually moved in with a Pashtun family in a hut in the mountains, where Ahmed visited monthly.

== Controversy ==
In 2002, Omar Khadr was captured in Afghanistan and was detained at the Guantanamo Bay detention camp for approximately ten years. His brother Abdurahman Khadr had been arrested and worked as an undercover informant with the CIA while at Guantanamo, and later continued to work undercover in Bosnia.

Ahmed Khadr was killed in 2003 near the Afghanistan border by what has been described in various sources as Pakistan security forces or a US drone. On April 9, 2004, Maha and Abdulkareem used the family's savings to return to Canada; The politicians Stockwell Day, Bob Runciman and John Cannis were among those in a public outcry calling for the Khadrs' citizenship to be revoked, and for the pair to be deported. Others suggested it was unfair to revoke citizenship from people who held views contrary to the government or majority.

Some Canadians complained that the Khadrs had "taken advantage of" Canada, living off its social services, while decrying it as a morally corrupted country. Ontario Premier Dalton McGuinty dissented, stating that the province would recognise the family's right to Ontario Health Insurance Plan medical coverage and to be treated like any other Canadian family.

In 2005, following the oldest daughter Zaynab's return to the country, Royal Canadian Mounted Police (RCMP) officer Konrad Shourie said, "The entire family is affiliated with al Qaeda and has participated in some form or another with these criminal extremist elements".

A noted friend of the family, former Pakistani Air Force officer and ISI agent Khalid Khawaja, spoke in their defense; he said that they were being unfairly targeted by Canadian authorities because of a deference to the United States (who held their youngest son), and Islamophobia. Since returning to Canada, the Khadr family has been described as "poverty-stricken".

In their 2008 report concerning Mahmoud Jaballah, Canadian Security Intelligence Service (CSIS) stated that Omar and his older brother Abdulkareem attended terror training camps. In late October 2010, Omar Khadr pleaded guilty to charges against him in a plea agreement before a Military Commission at Guantanamo, admitting to having received "one-on-one terrorist training from an al-Qaeda operative and that he threw the grenade that killed U.S. Sergeant Christopher Speer". He was sentenced to eight years imprisonment, in addition to the time already served. In 2012, he was repatriated to Canada to serve the remainder of his sentence.

== Representation in other media ==
- Son of Al-Qaeda, 2008, PBS Frontline documentary featuring Abdurahman Khadr, also included conversations with other members of his family. Transcript and excerpts from interviews available at website.
