= Khalid Habib =

Member of al-Qaeda

Khalid Habib (Arabic: خالد حبيب) (died October 16, 2008), born Shawqi Marzuq Abd al-Alam Dabbas (Arabic: شوقي مرزوق عبد العليم دباس), was an ascending member of al-Qaeda's central structure in Pakistan and Afghanistan. His nationality was reported as Egyptian (by CBS News) and as Moroccan (by The New York Times).

Habib was the operations commander for the region. He was one of several al-Qaeda members who were more battle-hardened by combat experience in Iraq, Chechnya, and elsewhere. This experience rendered them more capable than their predecessors. According to The New York Times, this cadre was more radical than the previous generation of al-Qaeda leadership. The FBI described Habib as "one of the five or six most capable, most experienced terrorists in the world.

In 2008, Habib relocated from Wana to Taparghai, Pakistan to avoid missile strikes launched from US-operated MQ-1 Predator aircraft which targeted al Qaeda and Taliban personnel. Khalid Habib was killed by a Predator strike near Taparghai on October 16, 2008. Habib was reportedly sitting in a Toyota station wagon which was struck by the missile. On October 28, militants confirmed to the Asia Times that Habib was killed in the drone attack.
