= Najim Jihad =

Najim Jihad (Pashto: نجم الجهاد; also Nazim Jihad, Abu Mahajin, Najim al Jihad complex) is a housing compound outside Jalalabad, Afghanistan, which is the former home of Osama bin Laden and approximately 250 followers.

With internal plumbing, the compound was formally located in Hadda.

In 1997, the Canadian NGO leader Ahmed Khadr began visiting Bin Laden in Nazim Jihad, and the following year his family moved into the compound, which his children nicknamed "Star Wars", while their father was away, but only stayed a short time before bin Laden moved to a new home and didn't invite the Khadrs to accompany him. In mid-1997, the Northern Alliance threatened to overrun Jalalabad, causing Bin Laden to abandon Nazim Jihad and move his operations to Kandahar in the south, although the Khadrs were not invited to follow him and consequently moved to Kabul.

In their tribunal proceedings at Guantanamo Bay, Abu Bakr Alahdal and Abdul Rahman Khowlan were accused of having stayed at Najim Jihad during the Fall of Kabul.

Hadda was also the site of a farming compound owned by Yunis Khalis, which bin Laden visited.
