= Afghan jihadist camp =

Facility used to train militants in Afghanistan

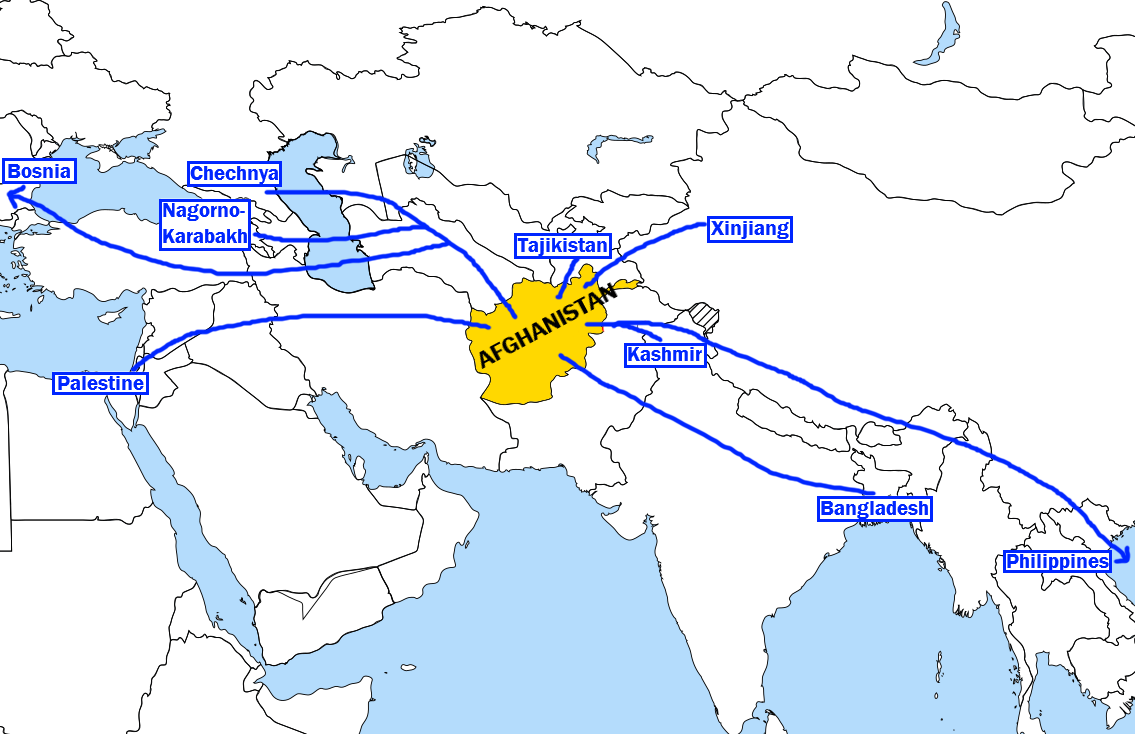
Terrorists who trained at camps in Afghanistan and fought in insurgencies around the world during the 1990s

An Afghan jihadist camp, or an Afghan training camp, is a term used to describe a camp or facility used for militant training located in Afghanistan. At the time of the September 11 attacks in 2001, Indian intelligence officials estimated that there were over 120 jihadist camps operating in Afghanistan and Pakistan, run by a variety of militant groups.

During the Afghan Civil War, the country was in a disordered state which was advantageous for international terrorists in the 1990s, especially al-Qaeda and various other groups like Jaish-e-Mohammed. These camps would eventually be used for training jihadists who would fight in various places, including Kashmir, Chechnya, Bosnia, the Philippines, Palestine, and Xinjiang (China). In 2002, journalists with The New York Times examined the sites of several former training camps, finding 5,000 documents. According to The New York Times:

The documents show that the training camps were focused largely on creating an army to support the Taliban, which was waging a long ground war against the Northern Alliance. During the period of the Bush administration officials described the camps as factories churning out terrorists.

On July 25, 2007, scholars at the Combating Terrorism Center at the United States Military Academy published a study that named over two dozen training camps allegedly attended by Guantanamo captives. In the al-Qaeda document, Military Studies in the Jihad Against Tyrants, a series of rules for training camps were laid out.

== History ==
Afghan training camps have been functioning for decades. It is believed that several thousand camps were established throughout Afghanistan in the 1980s for training the Afghan Mujahideen during the Soviet–Afghan War. These camps have historically not only provided militant and physical training but also an extensive educational training and devotion to Islamic history and faith.

Training was also originally provided by seasoned veterans of other armed forces around the world. For example, Osama bin Laden once opened a camp for non-Afghan fighters that was led by two former Egyptian servicemen.

== Curriculum ==
While in attendance at these camps, the majority of the recruits’ work revolves around physical training and spiritual devotion. While physical training is important to some operations, theology seems to be the most important task during training. Recruits are asked to memorize sacred texts and engage in prayer throughout the day's activities.

Recruits also learn to operate weapons, how to produce explosives and poisons, vehicle driving and maintenance, basic engineering, farming and urban guerilla tactics. In addition to these trainings recruits are also subject to mazes, obstacle courses, trenches, and classroom lectures.

== Admission to camps ==
According to captured documents, there are guidelines that recruits must satisfy before entering the camp. First, trainees are screened. They are evaluated on ethnicity, their devotion, and their willingness to fight. One entrance form states that recruits must leave behind all valuables, not prepare food while in the camp, obey regulations, and certify that they are in good health for training. The entrance form also asks recruits about their prior military and combat experience.

Secrecy is of the utmost importance, so it is common for the recruits inside the camp not to know fellow recruits’ or instructors’ names. In most cases, the recruits at these camps do not actually know the location of their camp. Trainees are also always kept in small groups of 7 to 10. Camps are also generally located in a desolate area, suitable for militant training, and physical training. One document also notes the camps usually have few entrances and exits.

== Known locations of Afghan training camps ==
al Farouq	More Guantanamo captives are alleged to have attended this camp than any other camp.; Training lasted for approximately one month.; Different Guantanamo captives are alleged to have been trained on a different mix of weapons at al Farouq. If al Farouq provided training on every weapon American intelligence analysts allege is available there then it would provide training on practically every weapon found on the modern battlefield.
Derunta	An article from The Guardian reports that US intelligence has evidence from a camp near the town Jalalabad by the name of Darunta is a home to Al-Qaeda's chemical warfare laboratory. Evidence found in the camp consisted of laboratory bottles filled with poison, including cyanide, bomb instruction manuals and evidence of international money transfers.
Tarnak Farms	One of Osama bin Laden's homes.; Converted into a coalition training facility.
Manogai Village Training Camp:	Witnesses say that recruiters are busy training recruits at these camps. People in both villages are outraged that the government has not done anything to take out these hubs of terror.
Pakash Village Training Camp:	Also in the same area as the Manogai Village and witness report seeing the same cavity in the area.
Hez-e Tahrir Camp:	Recruits were taught how to handle weapons, martial arts, as well as the English and Russian languages.
Sar-e Pul Province Training Center:	Local officials are reporting that terrorist activities are going on by the Taliban terrorist groups. Officials are claiming that they have set up “major” training camps for suicide bombers and insurgents in the district. Also, spokesman Zabihullah Amani said that the insurgents have set up a sanctuary in the Kohestant district and are using religious schools as military training camps.
Khandar province Training Camps:	The Washington Post reported that a US operation found “probably the largest” al-Qaeda the Khandar Province. The operation found the camp that was said to be over 30 square miles along with another small camp that was about one square mile with the large one. The training camps were found in the Shorbak district, an area right along the Pakistan border. The special operation was said to take several days to take down the camp in 2015, and was also in coordination with the Afghanistan military forces.
Herat training camp:	The Al-Matar training camp in Herat Province, near the border with Iran, was founded by Abu Musab al-Zarqawi in late 1999 or 2000 with $200,000 of financial support from Al-Qaeda. The camp existed until the U.S. invasion of Afghanistan. Throughout that period, Al-Zarqawi was not a member of Al-Qaeda.
Al-Ghuraba Camp: Al-Jihad Camp: Al-Saddiq Camp: Jihadwal Camp: Khabab Camp: Libyan/Torkhom Camp: Melak Center: Malik Camp: Mazar-Shariff Camp: Saman Khaela Camp:	All are reported camps in Afghanistan that were said to have been attended by Guantanamo Bay detainees.

== See also ==
- Terrorist training camp
