= 2002 Marib airstrike =

US drone strike on the leader of al-Qaeda in Yemen

- Part of the war on terror
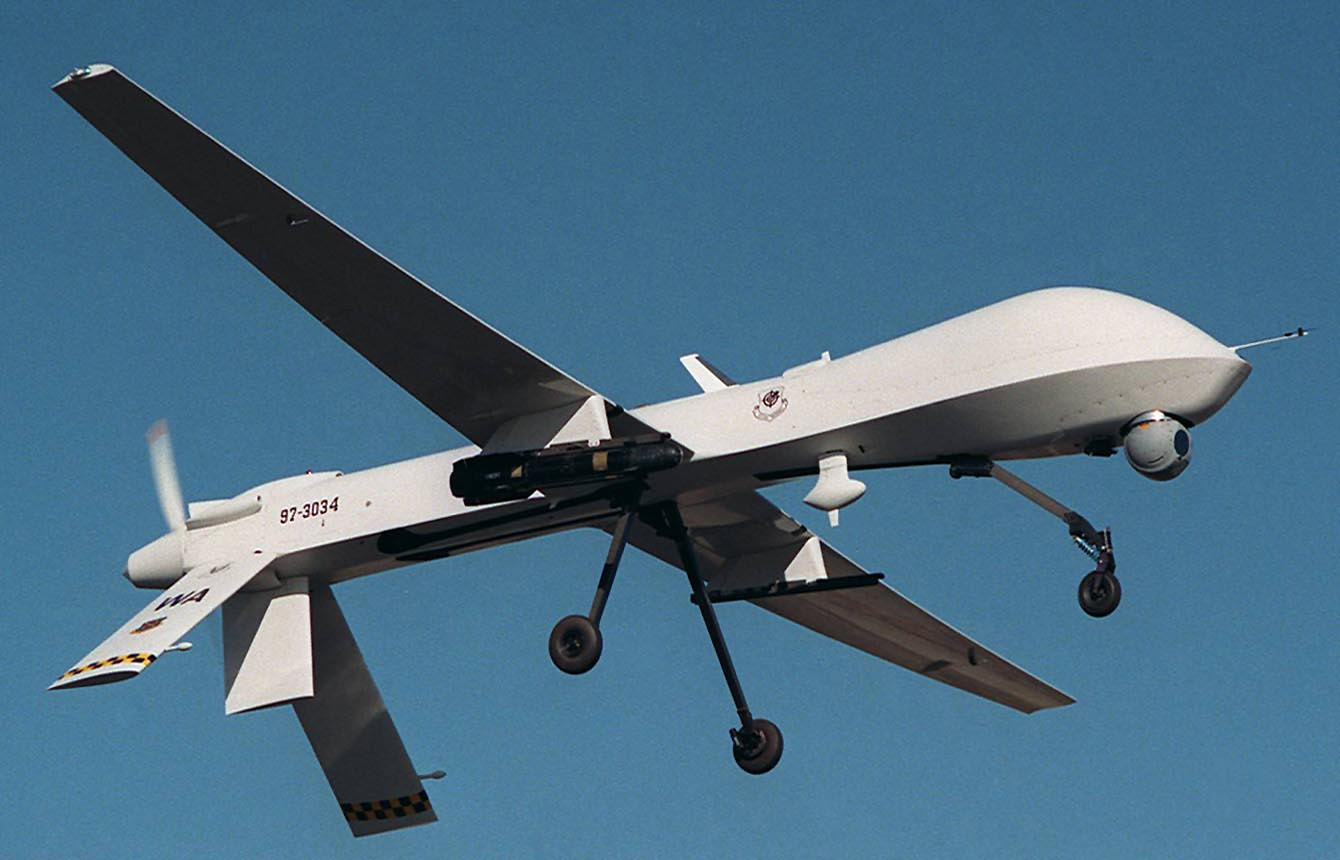
- An MQ-1 Predator drone armed with an AGM-114 Hellfire missile
- Type: Drone strike; targeted killing
- Location: Al-Naqaa desert, Marib Governorate, Yemen; 15.538461°N 45.687604°E
- Planned by: United States
- Commanded by: George Tenet
- Target: Abu Ali al-Harithi
- Date: November 3, 2002; 24 years ago
- Executed by: Central Intelligence Agency; Special Activities Division
- Outcome: Successful
- Casualties: 6 killed, including Harithi and Kamal Derwish; 1 injured
- Location within Yemen

On November 3, 2002, a remotely piloted aircraft operated by the Central Intelligence Agency (CIA) launched an airstrike on a vehicle travelling through Marib Governorate, Yemen. The strike killed six militants including its target Abu Ali al-Harithi, the leader of al-Qaeda in Yemen. It was the first drone strike conducted by the United States outside of a conventional battlefield, and the first targeted killing in the war on terror.

Harithi was a high-profile al-Qaeda member wanted for a role in the USS Cole bombing of 2000, and was subject to a joint US-Yemeni manhunt after the latter failed to capture him in 2001. On the day of the strike, his phone signal was intercepted by the National Security Agency (NSA) and his location pinpointed to a farm where the CIA's Special Activities Division routed an MQ-1 Predator to follow him as he left in a vehicle. After the NSA confirmed Harithi was in the vehicle CIA director George Tenet ordered the airstrike, which destroyed it and killed six people—one occupant escaped injured. DNA analysis verified the deaths of Harithi and four other militants along with Kamal Derwish, ringleader of the Lackawanna Six and an American citizen. The CIA publicly denied knowledge of his presence in the vehicle, although later reports contradict this.

Yemeni president Ali Abdullah Saleh agreed to the strike on the basis that it would be kept a secret, but with the George W. Bush administration seeking to capitalize on a victory in the war on terror during midterm elections season, Deputy Secretary of Defense Paul Wolfowitz publicly revealed it during a CNN interview two days afterwards. The announcement elicited concern from the international community and fury from the Yemeni public over what was perceived as a violation of sovereignty. Saleh and his government proceeded to ban further drone strikes in Yemen.

American legal experts generally believed the strike was not an assassination, which is illegal under American law, but instead a wartime action against enemy combatants, as claimed by the Bush administration. Many international observers disputed this and decried the strike as an extrajudicial killing, including the United Nations' expert on the matter, Asma Jahangir. The strike effectively neutralized al-Qaeda in Yemen for several years, though the group had reorganized by 2009 prompting further US intervention. American officials supported the operation and noted its success afterwards, with targeted killing soon being adopted as a core strategy in the war on terror across multiple theatres.

== Background ==
Prior to the attacks of September 11, 2001, targeted killing was a sensitive topic within the US government due to Executive Order 11905, which banned political assassinations upon its signing in 1976. Some exceptions and workarounds were permitted since then—a 1989 clarification ruled that terrorists could be subject to military strikes if they posed a threat to the US. The Bill Clinton administration considered giving the Central Intelligence Agency (CIA) authority to kill Osama bin Laden, the leader of al-Qaeda, after his 1998 fatwa declaring war on the US. No decision was reached on the matter, partly due to debates regarding what circumstances Bin Laden could be killed in without it being considered an assassination. A week before 9/11, senior officials from the George W. Bush administration were deliberating on whether to target Bin Laden using the MQ-1 Predator, a remotely piloted aircraft which had recently been modified to launch missiles.

In the aftermath of 9/11, officials in the White House and the military began to endorse limited targeted killing operations against al-Qaeda. Six days after the attacks, Bush signed a secret presidential finding which authorized the CIA to kill select members of al-Qaeda or other terrorist groups without direct presidential approval if they were considered high-value targets and could not be otherwise captured. The finding, requested by CIA director George Tenet, also approved the development of paramilitary-like formations in the CIA for these operations. According to then-Deputy Secretary of State Richard Armitage, Bush later authorized the CIA to conduct targeted killings through drone strikes in early 2002. The Predator was first deployed by the CIA during the invasion of Afghanistan to kill al-Qaeda and Taliban leaders, and saw further usage the following year.

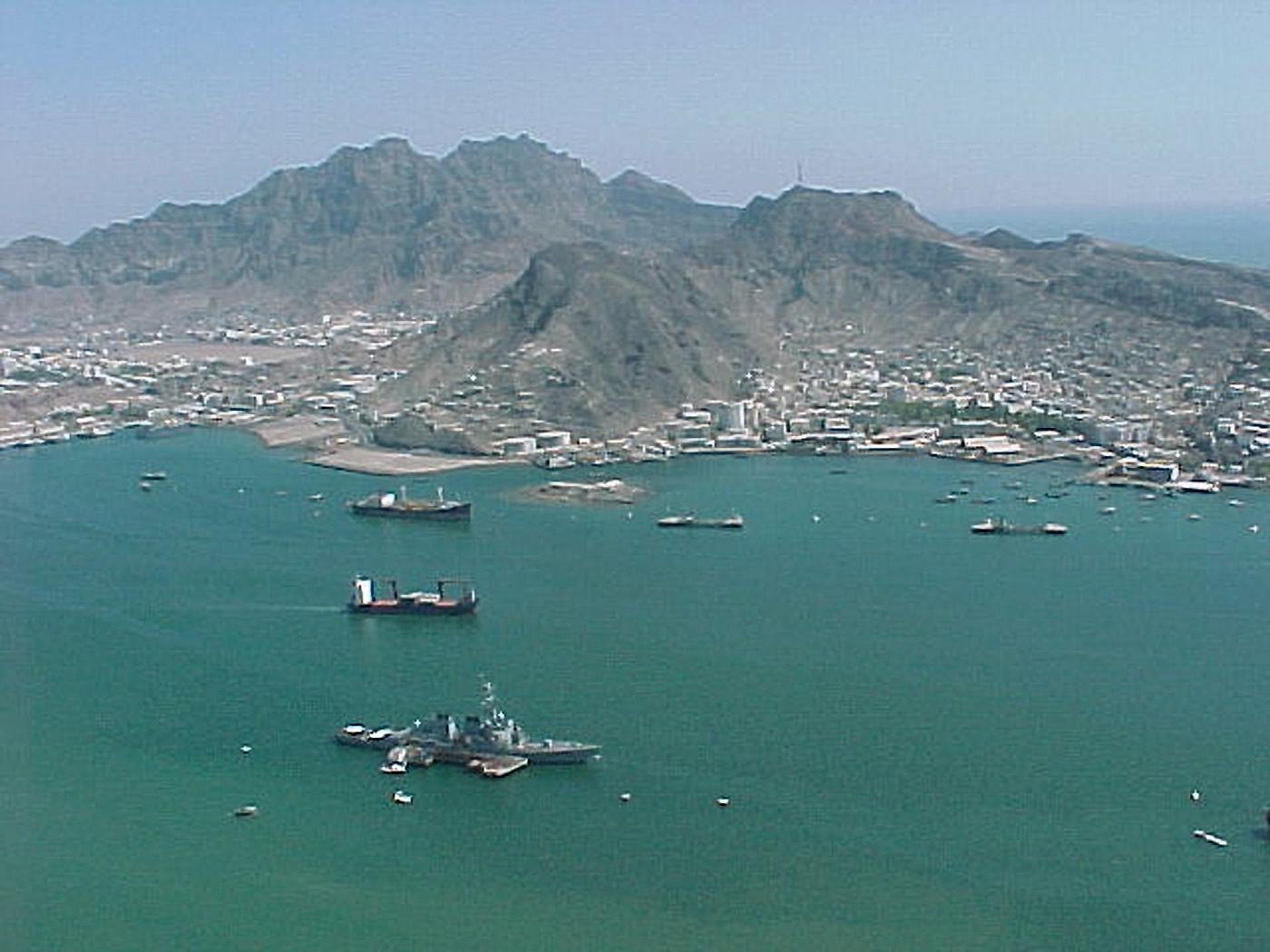
The USS Cole off the coast of Aden.

Relations between the US and Yemen had already been strained following the USS Cole bombing on October 12, 2000, when two al-Qaeda members rammed an explosive-laden boat into the US Navy vessel while it was docked at the port of Aden, killing 17 American sailors. The Federal Bureau of Investigation (FBI) and Naval Criminal Investigative Service (NCIS) conducted an investigation but encountered significant difficulties. The investigation was often hindered by local authorities, while the Americans suspected that Islamist sympathizers within the Yemeni government were complicit. The investigation was suspended in mid-2001 after authorities foiled a plot to bomb the local US embassy, where the investigators were lodged.

Within the American government, Yemen had begun to be seen as a central front for the war on terror and a prime destination for al-Qaeda members seeking refuge and a place to regroup, owing to its lawlessness and ungoverned areas. Yemen's president, Ali Abdullah Saleh, feared his country would be the next to see US military action after Afghanistan. Thus, Yemen took the role of a partner in the war on terror, with Saleh sending an advisor to Washington soon after the attacks to clarify what was needed of his country. Several demands were made by the US to assure greater collaboration on counterterrorism, such as the facilitation of greater intelligence cooperation, which allowed the CIA and FBI to resume the Cole investigation and gain access to key case documents, the establishment of a joint US-Yemeni intelligence room to rapidly share information on terrorist targets, with a Cryptologic Support Group (CSG) from the National Security Agency (NSA) being deployed to do so, and the sharing of phone records and dossiers for several al-Qaeda suspects with the CIA.

=== Abu Ali al-Harithi ===
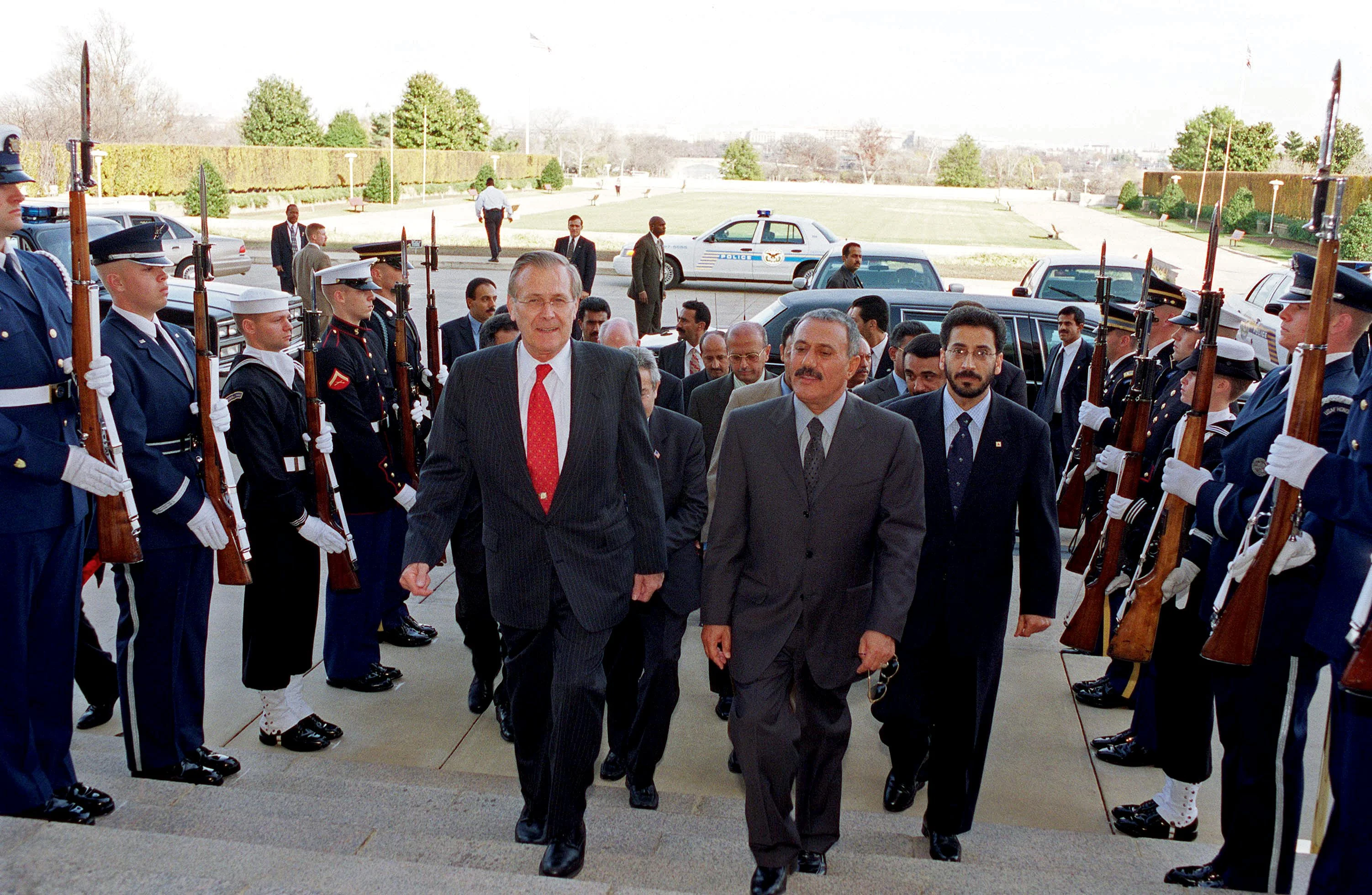
Secretary of Defense Donald Rumsfeld escorting Saleh into the Pentagon on November 26, 2001, the day before he met Bush at the White House.

Saleh made a visit to the United States in late November 2001. During a meeting at Yemen's official residence in Washington, CIA director George Tenet directly handed him a list of militants the US government wanted neutralized. The top priority on the list was the elimination of Abu Ali al-Harithi, al-Qaeda's chief of operations in Yemen as well as a central conspirator in the Cole bombing. This demand was reiterated the next day as Saleh publicly visited the White House, when Bush told him a "good first step" to prove his country's commitment to fighting terrorism was the arrest of Harithi. Although Bush expressed he would be comfortable sending in US special forces to complete the mission if the Yemenis were unable to, Saleh insisted his government alone would first try to deal with it. Harithi, along with a handful of other militants, were seeking tribal protection in the remote village of Hosun al-Jalal in Marib Governorate, remaining there from late August 2001 until mid or late November 2001, when they were pressured by the locals into leaving after authorities had demanded they be turned over. On December 18, 2001, Yemeni Republican Guard forces trained by the US launched a raid on the village in an attempt to capture Harithi and his associates. Clashes with local tribesmen left 18 soldiers dead.

In the aftermath of the failed raid, the Yemeni government quietly permitted the US to intensify its hunt for Harithi, including authorization for the CIA to fly surveillance drones over its airspace. Numerous US government agencies were involved in tracking down Harithi, including the CIA, the FBI, the NSA, the Intelligence Support Activity surveillance unit, US Central Command (CENTCOM) special forces, and State Department diplomats. US Special Forces teams ostensibly sent in March 2002 to train the Republican Guard were also preparing to "establish operational capacity to track al Qaeda suspects to find and fix their location so that US forces could finish them off." Ambassador Edmund Hull arranged meetings with local tribesmen and tribal sheikhs in Marib where he distributed payments in exchange for information on Harithi's whereabouts.

A breakthrough in the search came in August 2002, when an al-Qaeda plot to attack the local US embassy was foiled after two Islamists handling explosives accidentally detonated them in a Sanaa apartment. Yemeni and US authorities collaborated in the subsequent investigation and the interrogation of the apartment owner, which "regained the initiative" in the search for Harithi. Further advances were made in late October 2002 upon the arrest of Abdul Rahim al-Nashiri, the alleged mastermind of the Cole bombing, in the United Arab Emirates, where interrogators were able to listen to phone calls between him and Harithi. Harithi had kept on him up to five phones during his time on the run, each suspected to have been equipped with multiple SIM cards to throw off spies. From there, NSA agents gathered a partial list of phone numbers used by Harithi and set up a system which would sound an alarm at their headquarters in Fort Meade, Maryland, if one of his recorded numbers was ever in use.

By the time of October, Harithi and his bodyguards were believed to be residing in Yemen's portion of the Rub al Khali desert, constantly shifting locations while utilizing different vehicles and paying local Bedouins to navigate for them. Saudi Arabian license plates were later found on the vehicle he was killed in, suggesting to investigators he had been crossing the border between Yemen and Saudi Arabia. Both Yemeni and American special forces contingents, such as the 5th Special Forces Group, had been searching for Harithi on the ground for months, while US Air Force U-2 planes and CIA Predator's patrolled the airspace. In at least two instances, US forces were preparing to launch a drone strike before Yemeni agents informed them they were mistakenly targeting civilian Bedouins.

=== Kamal Derwish ===
Separately, by mid-2002, American authorities had launched an international manhunt to locate Kamal Derwish, a naturalized US citizen of Yemeni descent who was believed to be the ringleader of the Lackawanna Six, an alleged sleeper cell of Yemeni Americans charged with giving material support to al-Qaeda. Derwish was reportedly a "card carrying member of Al Qaeda" who radicalized the six men and recruited them to attend a training camp in Afghanistan in 2001. At the time of the arrest of the Lackawanna Six in September 2002, Derwish was referred to as an unindicted co-conspirator in the case. Later in the month, officials voiced belief he was hiding in Yemen, possibly in contact with Harithi. The possibility of killing Derwish was secretly discussed and approved within the government prior to the strike.

== Airstrike ==
On the afternoon of November 3, 2002, a TROJAN intelligence dissemination antenna system stationed at a US Army base in Kuwait intercepted the signal of a recorded phone number belonging to Harithi. NSA agents at their headquarters and the CSG unit in Yemen both responded to the signal and, using GPS tracking, pinpointed it to a farm in Marib Governorate. Stationed at a military base across the Gulf of Aden in the East African country of Djibouti, CIA agents from the Special Activities Division directed a Predator armed with two Hellfire missiles to the location. The drone operators had access to a live video feed from the Predator which was being transmitted to the base.

As the Predator reached and surveyed the position overhead, US special forces were preparing to launch a raid on the farm when Harithi left the premises. A Yemeni agent on the US ambassador's payroll watched Harithi enter a black Toyota Land Cruiser alongside five other men, and contacted the CIA to share the information. The agent also noted another vehicle was going with them designated specifically for women. The drone was monitoring Harithi as the group entered their vehicles and proceeded to follow them. CIA director George Tenet, who was viewing the Predator's video feed through a broadcast at the Counterterrorism Mission Center in Langley, phoned CENTCOM deputy commander Lieutenant General Michael DeLong to inform him on the target. DeLong went to the unmanned aerial vehicle (UAV) room in MacDill Air Force Base, where the video feed displayed the vehicle driving through the desert.

Tenet goes "You going to make the call?" And I said, "I'll make the call." He says, "This SUV over here is the one that has Ali in it." I said, "OK, fine." You know, "Shoot him." They lined it up and shot it.

— Lieutenant General Michael DeLong

When the intercepted call started, an NSA analyst immediately began listening, but was unfamiliar with the person speaking on the phone, who was driving the car while seemingly arranging a rendezvous point with another al-Qaeda operative. He eventually recognized Harithi was in the back seat of the Land Cruiser after hearing a six-second conversation of him giving directions to the driver, confirming it with a colleague. Tenet received and relayed the information to DeLong, both of them agreeing that Harithi was positively identified. The CIA had additionally determined Derwish was present in the vehicle, with Tenet reportedly telling DeLong over the phone "one of them is an American—the fat guy. But he's al-Qaeda." After receiving final approval to launch the strike from DeLong as well as President Saleh, Tenet gave permission to fire.

An hour after the cell signal was originally picked up, the Predator launched a missile at the Land Cruiser, as the vehicle made its way from the main road to an open track in the al-Naqaa desert. The vehicle was destroyed and six occupants were instantly killed. A seventh passenger managed to escape the vehicle before the missile struck and survived the attack injured. US officials blamed the severity of the destruction on an "unexplained secondary explosion", suggesting the vehicle held explosives or flammable materials. Local authorities found traces of weapons, ammunition, explosives and communications equipment within its remains. The destroyed vehicle was taken to Marib city a day later for inspection, while roadblocks were set up at the scene.

=== Casualties ===
Casualties

Killed

- Qaed Salim Sinan al-Harethi (Abu Ali)
- Munir Ahmed Abdullah (Abu Ubaidah)
- Saleh Hussein Ali al-Zenu (Abu Hammam)
- Owsan Ahmed al-Turaihi (Abu al-Jarrah)
- Adel Nasser al-Sowda (Abu Osama)
- Kamal Derwish (Ahmed Hijazi)

Injured

- Abdul Rauf Naseeb

— Sources:

A helicopter carrying Yemeni security officials arrived at the scene shortly after to examine the results and confirm the casualties. A CIA agent was also present, and collected DNA samples from those killed. The bodies of the victims were then transported to a military hospital in Sanaa, where American officials took additional DNA samples which were sent to a US military laboratory for identification. This process confirmed Harithi was one of those killed. He was reportedly the only identifiable person within the wreckage through a distinct mark on his leg, which he received from a gunshot while defending Bin Laden from an assassination attempt. Upon being discharged, returning Harithi's remains to his tribe, one of the largest and most powerful in the country, could have created problems for the Yemeni government if they claimed a wrongful killing in accordance to tribal law. This was averted however, as the family's liaison accepted his death as a path of his own making upon successful identification. His funeral and burial took place in Shabwah on November 9. Four other individuals killed were members of the Aden-Abyan Islamic Army, a local Islamist group linked to al-Qaeda and the USS Cole bombing. The final person killed was identified by the Yemeni government as Ahmed Hijazi.

On November 7, the Long Island-based newspaper Newsday was the first publication to report Ahmed Hijazi was an American citizen. At the time, authorities were reported to have been investigating whether Ahmed Hijazi was in fact Derwish, as the name matched an alias he was believed to have used according to the Lackawanna Six case. The CIA and FBI were conducting forensic tests, including DNA sampling, to definitively identify Hijazi. A US passport was reportedly found near the area of the strike and was used in the investigation.

Derwish's family learned of his death through media reports and were not contacted by the US government. On November 11, a woman believed to be a relative of Derwish confirmed his death and said their family was in mourning. By November 12, US officials believed Derwish was killed in the strike, and had used Ahmed Hijazi as a pseudonym. Officials initially claimed the CIA did not know Derwish was in the car at the time of the strike. However, this was contradicted by Dana Priest in a 2010 article for The Washington Post. According to her, the CIA knew Derwish was in the vehicle alongside Harithi, but due to the latter's importance and the rarity of the circumstances, the CIA justified the deaths of everyone in the car as legitimate because they were associating with him.

== Aftermath ==
Both the CIA and Saleh agreed to keep the airstrike a secret from the public; Deputy Secretary of State Richard Armitage recalled "the deniability was an important component of the mission". Shifting the blame would grant the US the luxury of avoiding questions about the legality and ethics of the operation. For the Yemeni government, it would allow them to avoid inevitable criticism and resentment of US military action that would arrive from the "traditional, tribal Muslim society" of Yemen. The Yemeni government publicly presented several cover-up stories to explain the incident; the Land Cruiser was carrying a propane tank or explosives and had blown up accidentally, or had struck a landmine in the desert. These narratives were what was originally reported by local and international media based on "unnamed tribal or government sources". Despite this, within two days local tribesmen were detailing to journalists how they had seen a helicopter at the scene of the strike, which US media interpreted to be a drone.

CIA and Department of Defense personnel initially refused to discuss the strike publicly, only stating the US military was not responsible. However, in spite of the agreement, Washington was eager to showcase a significant victory in the war on terror and a definite projection of power. Secretary of Defense Donald Rumsfeld refused to directly acknowledge any US involvement, but told reporters regarding the death of Harithi "it would be a very good thing if he were out of business". During a rally for the upcoming midterm elections, Bush told supporters al-Qaeda would be treated as "international killers" and would be hunted down wherever. Beyond indirect references, by the next day several news agencies were reporting a drone strike conducted by the CIA via anonymous sources. However, these were still perceived internally as "vague sourcing that could be absorbed in the static of unending news in the Middle East."

=== Public leak and reactions ===
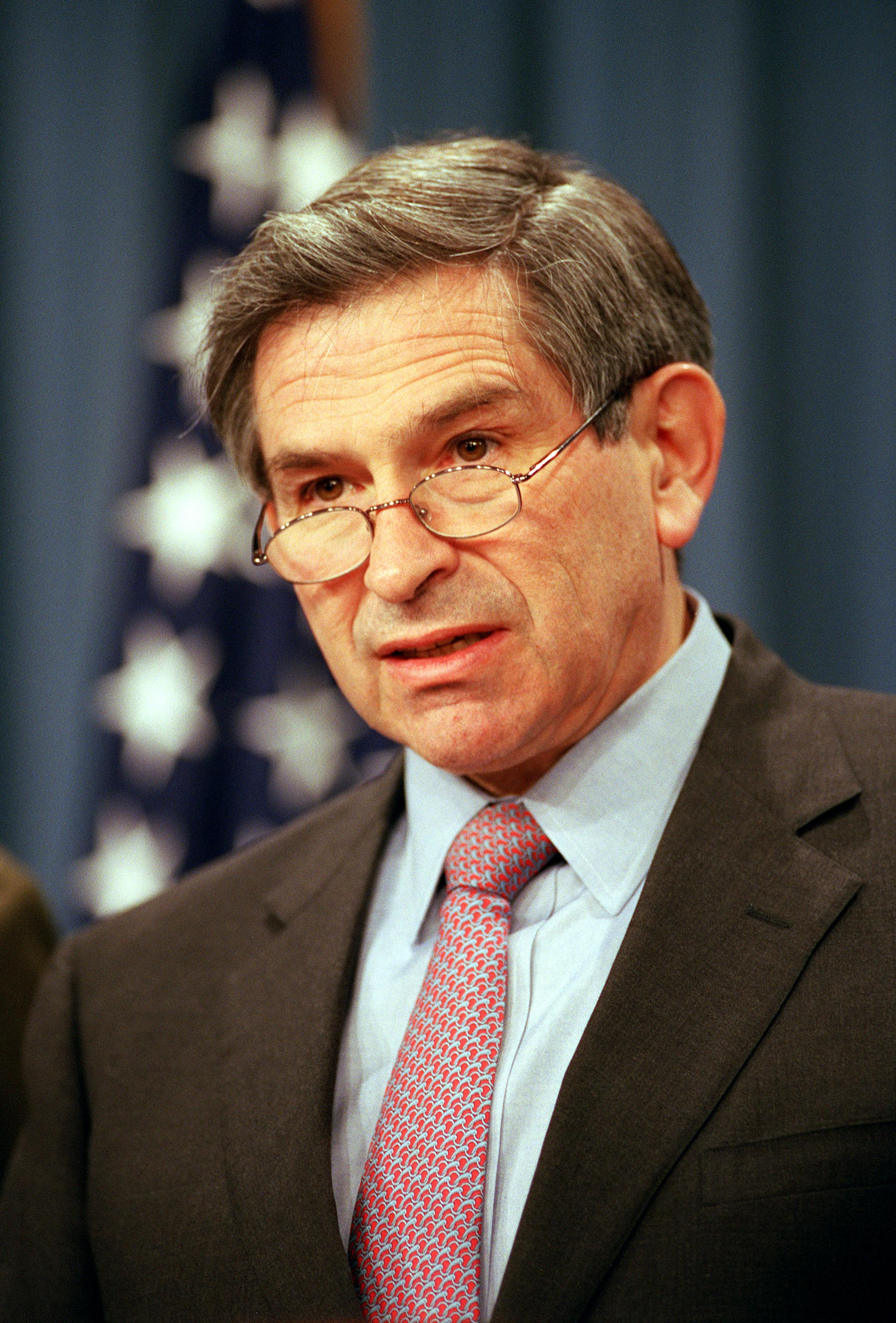
Deputy Secretary of Defense Paul Wolfowitz leaked the strike to the public in spite of an agreement with the Yemeni government to keep it a secret.

Deputy Secretary of Defense Paul Wolfowitz revealed the US had conducted the drone strike and praised it during an interview with CNN on November 5, labeling it a success against al-Qaeda which would pressure it to change its tactics. Wolfowitz's public acknowledgement of the strike, allegedly done on the order of Rumsfeld, was intended to serve as a victory for the Bush administration just before midterm elections were set to take place. Within the government, it was likely assumed the disclosure would not cause significant controversy as the Yemeni government had agreed to it and no civilians were harmed. The Telegraph reported the disclosure may have provided a boost in popularity for the Republican Party during the election.

The American public was generally supportive of the strike, praising it as a success in the war on terror. It was noted to be consistent with the Bush Doctrine, which commits to preemptive strikes against terrorist targets. Meanwhile, the Yemeni-American community in Lackawanna mourned the death of Derwish and questioned the decision to kill him. Within the international community, several figures condemned the strike as an extrajudicial killing. The open adoption of a targeted killing operation led to accusations of the US holding a double standard on the matter, as it routinely condemned Israel's targeted killings of Hamas leaders. Furthermore, the revelation that an American citizen was killed led to additional opposition from civil liberties and human rights groups.

Internally, the American intelligence and special operations communities, which had specifically intended for the strike to remain confidential, were angered by the public claim of responsibility. One CIA official complained other countries would be more hesitant of allowing the organization to operate their Predators due to the leak. Regardless, the Bush administration publicly defended the strike and claimed it was not representative of a broader shift in policy. Several officials, such as National Security Advisor Condoleezza Rice and White House press secretary Ari Fleischer, called it a defensive act and highlighted the unique nature of the war on terror as justification. State Department spokesperson Richard Boucher affirmed the US would maintain its position on targeted killing in regards to the Israeli–Palestinian conflict. Secretary of State Colin Powell dismissed targeted killing-related criticisms by equating the strike to other operations launched by previous administrations, specifically the 1998 missile strikes in Afghanistan against Bin Laden and al-Qaeda. He further elaborated this instance of targeted killing was different than Israel's as the latter was obstructing the region's peace process.

In contrast to most of the Western world, news of the strike produced outrage in Yemen. Even prior to it, sentiment critical of the US and in some regards sympathetic to Islamists already ran high among parts of the populace. This was further amplified amid the buildup to the invasion of Iraq, leading to the Yemeni public virulently opposing any cooperation with the US during the timeframe. In the immediate aftermath of the leak, Middle Eastern political analyst Walid Kazziha said:

On an official level in the Arab world I think there will be a lot of resentment simply because, even though the Yemen government and other Arab governments are cooperating in terms of information, intelligence with the United States, this kind of action undermines the credibility of the Arab governments friendly to the United States. I think on the level of governments they would be put in an awkward position. On the level of the public it would only infuriate the public and draw more parallels between U.S. actions and Israeli actions.

As Wolfowitz's statement, which directly contradicted Sanaa's narrative, was repeatedly broadcast by CNN and reported elsewhere, it created the implication to Yemenis the US was seeking to intentionally humiliate their government. A survey by the Yemen Times found 93% of Sanaa residents disapproved of the strike, 85% viewed it as a violation of sovereignty, and 97% did not believe the Yemeni government had permitted it. Nationwide anti-American protests led to authorities evacuating and temporarily shutting down the US embassy in Sanaa. The local political opposition capitalized on the events to berate the Saleh administration and its credibility gap.

The Yemeni government was angered at the US violating their agreement on maintaining the secrecy of the strike, partly due to the fact that they were still hunting Harithi's associates. Ambassador Hull received numerous phone calls from upset Yemeni officials urging the Wolfowitz interview be pulled, though their American counterparts communicated they had no control over the situation. Yahya al-Muttawakil, a senior member of the ruling General People's Congress, was the first official to publicly discuss the strike. He told an interviewer the situation was an example as to why Yemen was reluctant to cooperate closely with the US, saying "They don't consider the internal circumstances in Yemen. In security matters, you don't want to alert the enemy." On November 19, interior minister Rashad al-Alimi acknowledged Yemen's cooperation in conducting the strike and claimed they were intending to release a joint statement with the US before the leak.

President Saleh was enraged by the leak, and complained to American general Tommy Franks during a later meeting it would "cause major problems for me." He felt as though he was slighted and embarrassed by the US after risking his reputation locally and in the region, particularly with Iraqi president Saddam Hussein. Denying it at first, it would take a year for him to eventually admit he had personally authorized the strike amid relentless public criticism. The US was thereon banned from launching airstrikes from drones over the country's airspace from 2002 onwards, maintained for the rest of Bush's time in office. According to Hull, "Saleh drew a lesson: while counterterrorism cooperation with the Americans could be effective, it could not be discreet."

=== Al-Qaeda response ===
Being the most senior al-Qaeda commander remaining in Yemen, Fawaz al-Rabeiee organized a cell to assassinate Hull as revenge for the killing of Harithi. The plot was developed throughout the rest of 2002 into early 2003. Three militants Ibrahim Howaidi, Abdulghani Qifan, and Qasim al-Raymi, were tasked with monitoring the ambassador's convoy as it left the American embassy in Sanaa, while Fawzi al-Habibi obtained heavy weaponry. Only two routes were available from the embassy's main gate; one from the right leading to a roundabout and another from the left heading towards an intersection. The militants were planning to wait at either location and ambush Hull as his vehicle drove through, either with explosives or with small arms. Yemeni intelligence eventually uncovered the safehouse in Sanaa's Madhbah neighborhood from which the attack was being planned, and sent in security forces to raid the premises in early March 2003. Rabeiee and another militant, Hizam Mujali, managed to escape the scene in a vehicle and head southwards to Abyan, where they confronted and killed a police officer at a checkpoint and then drove to Marib, where they were captured weeks later. Five men were convicted of plotting the attack and were sentenced to five years of imprisonment in August 2004.

=== Survivor ===
The sole survivor of the strike, Abdul Rauf Naseeb, continued to "bedevil counterterrorism authorities for years to come". He had managed to successfully flee the scene after the strike as the US "thought he had expired somewhere in the desert." The Yemeni government stated later in November that security were pursuing Naseeb, who was not named in their statement. Naseeb was apprehended by security forces in Abyan governorate on March 4, 2004, after being besieged in the mountains with a group of militants the previous day. He was suspected of planning the April 2003 prison break in Aden which freed several al-Qaeda suspects involved in the USS Cole bombing. He was tried in a Yemeni court for an alleged minor role in the Cole bombing, but was later acquitted. He was arrested once again in 2012 as an al-Qaeda in the Arabian Peninsula commander, and was killed by another drone strike later in the year.

== Legality ==
=== Under US law ===
With assassinations considered illegal under American law, officials publicly rationalized the strike through the fact that none of the individuals killed were regarded as political leaders, as well as through a presidential finding authorizing the CIA to attack al-Qaeda targets internationally, making Harithi, Derwish and their associates armed combatants and military targets.

Most American legal experts, although critical of the government's methods in some regards, did not deem the strike on Harithi to be illegal under domestic law. Jeffrey Smith, former general counsel of the CIA, said the operation "was not an assassination–it was simply a responsive military strike." Suzanne Spaulding, a former deputy general counsel, believed it could not be considered an assassination due to the Bush administration framing the strike as a wartime action against an enemy combatant. Defining an assassination as a killing which "is undertaken for political purposes during peacetime", Duke University law professor Scott Silliman saw the strike as ineligible to be considered so as the US was "most emphatically at war". American University Washington College of Law professor Robert K. Goldman believed the Bush administration would frame the strike as a case of self-defense against al-Qaeda, stating: "The US is not in a situation of peace with these people. This is not putting poison into Castro's toothpaste." Not all opinions were positive however. President emeritus of the International Human Rights Law Institute at DePaul University, M. Cherif Bassiouni, called the strike "a dangerous precedent", comparing the situation to "if a US drug agent killed a narcotics trafficker rather than arresting him and putting him on trial". According to him, relatives of the victims killed could potentially sue US officials involved in the strike under the Alien Tort Claims Act, but not the CIA itself due to sovereign immunity. The US State Department initially intended to regard the strike as an extrajudicial killing in its annual report on human rights in Yemen, but removed it at Hull's request after Bush referred to it as a success during his 2003 State of the Union Address.

American citizens are typically granted significant legal protections by the US regardless of whether or not they are overseas or part of groups hostile to the country. At the time, the CIA claimed it was specifically targeting Harithi in the strike and did not know Derwish, who held US citizenship, was in the vehicle. Officials rejected assertions his citizenship would make a difference in his killing as he was affiliated with al-Qaeda, and thus was an enemy combatant. National Security Advisor Condoleezza Rice, during an appearance on Fox News Sunday, maintained the strike did not breach Derwish's rights under the American constitution. In December, anonymous officials further elaborated on the presidential finding, stating it did not differentiate between Americans associated with al-Qaeda and non-Americans. Therefore, because Derwish was fighting alongside an enemy combatant, his constitutional rights could effectively be voided. Regarding the rationale for killing Derwish, CBS legal analyst Andrew Cohen said:

This is legal because the President and his lawyers say so — it's not much more complicated than that. Congress has no great political incentive to tie the hands of the White House in going after these sorts of adversaries. And the federal courts won't get involved unless and until someone challenges the practice — and that's not likely given how these things typically play out. This is just the new reality, — new rules for a new kind of war — and there really isn't much anyone who doesn't like it can do about it right now. The president has the authority to order the killing of enemy soldiers in wartime and that authority apparently has been extended to a much cloudier area.

=== Under international law ===
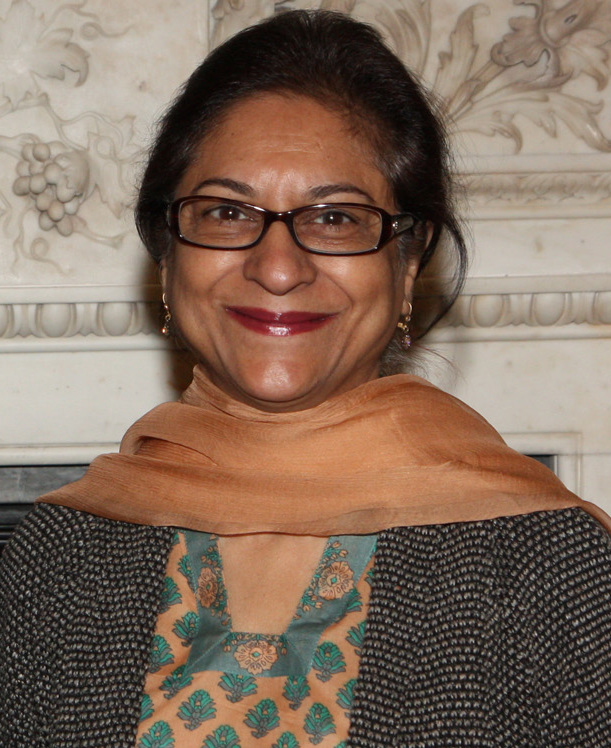
Asma Jahangir, a United Nations special rapporteur, believed the strike to be an extrajudicial killing.

The strike was viewed by the international community as not occurring within a legally defined battlefield, where actions would be governed by the law of war and international humanitarian law. The Bush administration sought to portray the strike as part of "an armed conflict against Al Qaida" and the target as an enemy combatant due to Harithi's involvement in the USS Cole bombing, but at the same time they classified the war on terror as neither type of recognized armed conflict: an international conflict between sovereign states or a non-international conflict, which referred to state's fighting insurgencies or civil wars within their own territory. Due to this, the strike was viewed as taking place in a nation considered to be at peace with the US, thus invoking international human rights law, the lens through which critics of the strike viewed it.

Sweden's foreign minister Anna Lindh called the strike a summary execution, arguing "even terrorists must be treated according to international law. Otherwise any country can start executing those whom they consider terrorists". In a letter directed to Bush, Amnesty International stated "if this was the deliberate killing of suspects in lieu of arrest in circumstances in which they did not pose an immediate threat, the killings would be extrajudicial executions in violation of international human rights law", urging his administration to condemn the practice and hold those involved responsible. Human Rights Watch initially viewed the strike as legitimate, considering Harithi's status as a combatant to be valid and factoring in the lack of law enforcement that might apprehend him in the ungoverned region. However, it later wrote in its year-end report the strike could set a precedent for a "huge loophole in due process protections worldwide" if the US could single-handedly determine who is a combatant and then act on it. Charles Allen, deputy general counsel of the Department of Defense, rejected these criticisms by claiming the strike to be an act of self-defense and consistent with the law of war. He further said the US was not obliged to tell the militants to surrender before they launched the strike as it was a "lawful military target".

On November 15, 2002, Asma Jahangir, the United Nations special rapporteur on extrajudicial, summary, or arbitrary executions, issued her opinion on the strike in a message to the US and Yemen, stating it "constitutes a clear case of extrajudicial killing", violated international human rights and humanitarian law, and could potentially normalize the practice so long as the host country consents to it. Yemen responded to the UN first, explaining the individuals killed in the strike were being pursued by authorities for terrorist activities, and were previously sought out for arrest multiple times but escaped.

The US government essentially disregarded the concern from the UN. The State Department responded to Jahangir's comments in April 2003, expressing neutrality on the findings but criticizing the consideration of the strike as extrajudicial in the first place, claiming that it had occurred in the context of an armed conflict and thus, by considering al-Qaeda to be a participant, "enemy combatants may be attacked unless they have surrendered or are otherwise rendered hors de combat". The statement asserted the strike was not within the UN Human Rights Council or the special rapporteur's jurisdiction. Based on this outlook, al-Qaeda members were theoretically "combatants who are susceptible to direct attack at all times" according to professor Goldman. A report by Amnesty International questioned this defense and the relevance of the law of war in the strike's context, noting the US (a state-actor) could not legally be considered to be at war with al-Qaeda (a non-state actor) or Yemen, nor could Yemen be considered as being at war with al-Qaeda and the US be a supporting combatant. The report reiterates the organization's view that the individuals should have been genuinely pursued for capture by the US and Yemen before being killed.

== Analysis ==
The elimination of Harithi, a veteran militant who personally trained many recruits into skilled fighters, dealt al-Qaeda in Yemen a significant blow. Neither of the two next highest-ranking members of the group in Yemen, Rabeiee or Mohammed Hamdi al-Ahdal, were prepared to take over for him, the former due to a lack of experience and the latter mostly having a logistics role. Although Ahdal took the role of caretaker leader, with dozens of his men having been arrested as part of a government crackdown and he himself facing pressure, the group was in shambles. On September 25, 2003, Ahdal surrendered to authorities after they found him at a wedding party in Sanaa. This event effectively marked the defeat of al-Qaeda in Yemen, and from 2003 to 2006 both the American and Yemeni governments shifted their attention to other matters. However, this period of relieved pressure gave al-Qaeda time to recuperate; imprisoned militants radicalized many younger cellmates arrested on only loose affiliations to the group. Through a prison escape in 2006 which freed several key militants, al-Qaeda in Yemen would reorganize and once again emerge as a threat, culminating in a 2008 attack on the US embassy which served as a "wake-up call for all of Washington." US military action took place in Yemen again starting in 2009, while drones began to launch targeted strikes in the country in 2011 as Saleh's control weakened amid the Yemeni revolution.

According to political scientist Micah Zenko, the strike had one military objective: the death of Harithi, along with two larger political objectives; the demoralization of al-Qaeda which would ward off future terrorist attacks against the US and its allies, and to "compel more consistent counterterrorism cooperation from Yemen." Militarily, the strike succeeded. However, although some signals intelligence reports were received indicating al-Qaeda was initially shocked by the strike, the group as a whole still perpetrated numerous attacks throughout the decade, and the death of Harithi likely did not affect planning for any attacks as he had spent most of his time up until that point evading the search for him. Although the Yemeni government cracked down on local support for al-Qaeda in some regards, intelligence cooperation remained inconsistent as some internal elements remained sympathetic to the group, and likely assisted in perpetrating the 2006 prison break.

Officials within the Bush administration and the military were highly supportive of the strike, including Bush himself, and its effectiveness was noted afterwards. Prior to it, the only other drone strikes conducted by the US were within the war in Afghanistan; though they were widely regarded as military actions rather than targeted killings. Therefore, the decision to launch the strike in Yemen made it the first operation to be conducted against al-Qaeda outside of Afghanistan and in a country which was not an active battlefield. The death of Derwish was also the first instance of an American citizen being killed by the US during the war on terror. Commentators have labeled the strike "momentous" and "a seminal moment in the war on terror" for these reasons. Targeted killing would come to be recognized by the US as a key means of counterterrorism, with the State Department eventually ending its criticism of Israel for the practice. By the time of the presidency of Barack Obama, targeted killing through drone strikes were expanded and normalized as a strategy to a campaign encompassing Yemen, Somalia and Pakistan. The Obama administration used the death of Derwish as a precedent for the killing of Anwar al-Awlaki, a fellow Yemeni-American jihadist assassinated by a CIA drone in 2011.

Learning from the Wolfowitz leak, the political repercussions and the legal implications which followed it, both the Bush and Obama administrations shrouded their later drone campaigns in secrecy; official discussion of the subject would not occur until 2013. More generally, the strike contributed towards the normalization of targeted killing in the view of the Western world, which allowed the US and its allies to eventually endorse the tactic without even having to offer a legal explanation for it, such as with the killing of Bin Laden in Pakistan and Ayman al-Zawahiri in Afghanistan, the assassination of Iranian general Qasem Soleimani in Iraq, and Israel's assassination of Hezbollah leader Hassan Nasrallah in Lebanon.

== See also ==
- Foreign policy of the George W. Bush administration
- United States–Yemen relations
- 2010 Marib airstrike
