= Paul L. Williams (author) =

American writer (born 1944)

Paul L. Williams (born September 30, 1944) is an American academic, journalist, author, conspiracy theorist and former consultant to the FBI on matters of terrorism.

== Early life and career ==
Paul L. Williams was born September 30, 1944, in Scranton, Pennsylvania. He attended Central High School there. He received a BA degree from Wilkes College and a doctorate in medieval theology from Drew University in 1976. He was an adjunct professor at the University of Scranton. He was a consultant to the FBI on matters of terrorism. He also wrote as a journalist for the National Review.

== Works ==
Williams has authored several books. His first book was The Moral Philosophy of Peter Abelard, in 1980. The Vatican Exposed was published in 2003. In 2007 he published The Day of Islam: The Annihilation of America and the Western World (Prometheus Books, 2007). Operation Gladio: The Unholy Alliance between the Vatican, the CIA, and the Mafia, was published in 2014. His most recent work, Among the Ruins: The Decline and Fall of the Roman Catholic Church, was published in 2017.

In Williams' 2006 book Dunces of Doomsday, he claimed known or suspected terrorists had been seen around Hamilton, Ontario in 2005: Adnan Shukrijumah, Amer el-Maati, Jaber A. Elbaneh and Anas al-Liby. Williams also claimed Shukrijumah had been seen at McMaster University where he "wasted no time in gaining access to the nuclear reactor and stealing more than 180 pounds of nuclear material for the creation of radiological bombs". Williams was subsequently sued by the university for libel, with the lawyer representing the university in the case saying that, "Mr. Williams' allegations about McMaster [are] on a par with UFO reports and JFK conspiracy theories.... The notion that because there are people on faculty from Egypt that McMaster is then a haven for terrorism is not only logically offensive, it smacks of racism." The publisher later apologized for allowing Williams to print statements which "were without basis in fact"; Williams remained defiant saying, "I love them coming after us. At the end of the day these people are going to be bloodied because what I am saying is true. They are not going to walk away from this unscathed because I will proclaim what is going on at McMaster from the rooftops." Williams then sued his publisher.

== Books ==
- Criterion-Referenced Testing for the Social Studies (co-editor, 1980)
- Historicism and Faith: Proceedings of the Fellowship of Catholic Scholars (editor, 1980)
- The Moral Philosophy of Peter Abelard (1980)
- Christian Faith in a Neo-pagan Society: Proceedings of the Third Convention of the Fellowship of Catholic Scholars (editor, 1981)
- Christian Faith and Freedom: Proceedings of the Fourth Convention of the Fellowship of Catholic Scholars (editor, 1982)
- Catholic Social Thought and the Teaching of John Paul II: Proceedings of the Fifth Convention (1982) of the Fellowship of Catholic Scholars, Chicago, Illinois, March 26-28, 1982 (editor, 1983)
- Everything You Wanted to know about the Catholic Church - Doubleday Books, ISBN 0-385-24882-2 (1989)
- The Complete Idiot's Guide to the Crusades, Penguin, ISBN 0-02-864243-0 (2001)
- The Complete Idiot's Guide to the Lives of the Saints, Penguin, ISBN 0028642112 (2001)
- The Life and Work of Mother Teresa, Alpha, ISBN 0-02-864278-3 (2001)
- Al Qaeda: Brotherhood of Terror - Alpha Books ISBN 0-02-864352-6 (2002)
- The Vatican Exposed. Money, Murder, and the Mafia - Prometheus Books ISBN 1-59102-065-4 (2003)
- Osama's Revenge: The Next 9/11: What the Media and the Government Haven't Told You, Prometheus Books, ISBN 1-59102-252-5 (2004)
- Al Qaeda Connection: International Terrorism, Organized Crime, and the Coming Apocalypse, Prometheus Books, ISBN 1-59102-349-1 (2005)
- Dunces of Doomsday: 10 Blunders that Gave Rise to Radical Islam, Terrorist Regimes, and an American Hiroshima, WND Books, ISBN 1-58182-529-3 (2006)
- The Day of Islam: The Annihilation of America and the Western World, Prometheus Books, ISBN 1-59102-508-7 (5 June 2007)
- Crescent Moon Rising: The Islamic Transformation of America (2013)
- Operation Gladio: The Unholy Alliance between the Vatican, the CIA, and the Mafia, Prometheus Books, ISBN 978-1-61614-974-1 (2015)
- Among the Ruins: The Decline and Fall of the Roman Catholic Church (2017)
