= Jaber A. Elbaneh =

Yemeni-American terrorist

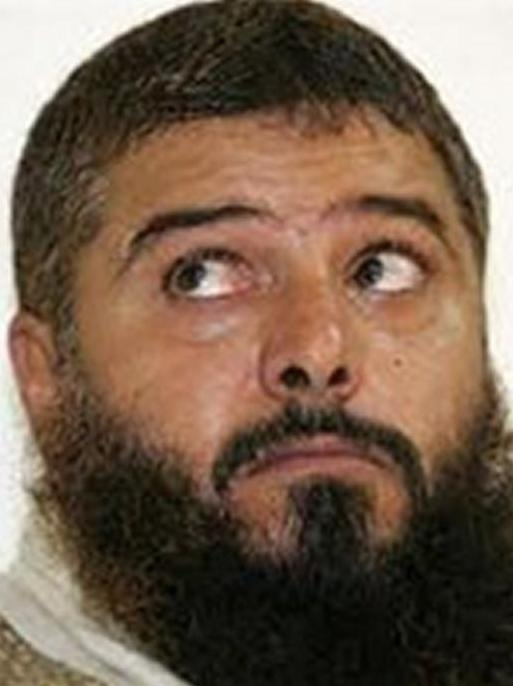
- Jaber Albaneh is wanted by the FBI for Providing Material Support to a Terrorist Organization; Conspiring to Provide Material Support to a Terrorist Organization.
- Born: September 6, 1966 (age 59); Yemen
- Disappeared: 2008; Yemen
- Other names: Gabr al-Bana; Jaber A. Elbanelt; Jaben A. Elbanelt; Jabor Elbaneh; Abu Jubaer; Jubaer Elbaneh; "Jubair"
- Citizenship: Yemeni
- Known for: Being on the FBI Seeking Information – Terrorism list; Affiliation with the Lackawanna Six
- Height: 5 ft 8 in (1.73 m)

Jaber A. Elbaneh, also known as Gabr al-Bana (Arabic: جبر البنا; born September 9, 1966) is a Yemeni-American who was labeled a suspected terrorist by the United States after it emerged that he had attended the Al Farouq training camp alongside the Lackawanna Six, and remained on at the camp after they returned home. He fled to Yemen, where he worked as a cab driver before turning himself in to authorities.

As Yemeni officials squabbled over his $US5 million reward, he escaped in a mass breakout along with a number of other high-profile prisoners, and was added to the FBI Most Wanted Terrorists list. When Yemen convicted him in absentia for conspiracy in a plot against oil facilities, he again turned himself in to the police, and served a 5-year sentence. He is related to Susan Elbaneh, the only American victim of a terrorist attack against the U.S. Embassy in Yemen in September 2008.

== Life in the United States ==
Born in Yemen, Elbaneh lived in the United States, where he maintained a "spotty work history", with his longest stint being at a New York cheese factory. He is married, with seven children.

Elbaneh was closely associated with the Lackawanna Six, a group of American friends living in the suburbs of Buffalo, New York who had attended an Afghan training camp together prior to the outbreak of the war on terror. When the group went to Galyan's Sporting Goods in Cheektowaga to outfit themselves for the trip, purchasing boots, flashlights, books, diarrhea medication and other essentials, he laughed that he would just add it all onto his credit card account, bringing his total debt to $145,000.

Elbaneh was also indicted in absentia in a federal criminal complaint unsealed on May 21, 2003, in the United States District Court for the Western District of New York, Buffalo, New York. All of them attended get-togethers at the apartment of Kamal Derwish, and Elbaneh and Yahya Goba tended to "compete" for the attention and favour of Derwish, who spoke of his travels abroad and ostensible history fighting in Palestine.

Mr. Williams' allegations about McMaster [are] on par a par with UFO reports and JFK conspiracy theories ... that notion that because there are people on faculty from Egypt that McMaster is then a haven for terrorism is not only logically offensive, it smack of racism.

In October, FBI consultant Paul Williams wrote a book Dunces of Doomsday in which he claimed that Adnan Shukrijumah, Amer el-Maati, Elbaneh and Anas al-Liby had all been seen around Hamilton, Ontario the previous year, and that Shukrijumah had been seen at McMaster University where he "wasted no time in gaining access to the nuclear reactor and stealing more than 180 pounds of nuclear material for the creation of radiological bombs". He was subsequently sued by the University for libel, as there had been no evidence to suggest any part of his story was true. The publisher later apologised for allowing Williams to print statements which "were without basis in fact".

By June 2003, Elbaneh had been added to the FBI Seeking Information - Terrorism list.

== Arrest and escape ==
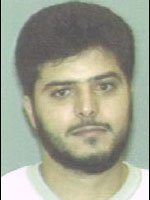
Jaber A. Elbaneh in 1996

Elbaneh worked as a cabbie in San'a for months, before turning himself in to Yemeni authorities. He was sent to a maximum-security prison run by the Political Security Office, while authorities argued with the United States over the substantial $5 million reward, and who should receive it. Some suggested that if they refused to turn Elbaneh over immediately, the United States might increase the reward.

Elbaneh was named as one of 23 people who escaped from a Yemeni prison on February 3, 2006. Prisoners had banned guards from entering the prison basement, as they dug a 143' tunnel using a broomstick and a sharpened spoon, which exited in the women's washroom of a nearby mosque. They had masked the sounds of their escape by playing football to distract guards.

The FBI confirmed the escape on February 23 as they issued a national press release naming Elbaneh as one of the first new additions, since inception in 2001, to the FBI Most Wanted Terrorists list. They also stated that they believed the escaped prisoners, which included Jamal al-Badawi who had a previous successful escape from custody, had likely received help from female sympathisers attending the mosque, who may have helped digging the tunnel from their end.

He is now listed on U.S. Rewards for Justice Program with a $US5 million bounty for his capture.

== 2007 conviction ==
In 2007, a Yemeni court convicted Elbaneh in absentia for the 2002 oil facilities plot and sentenced him to 10 years imprisonment. In December 2007, Elbaneh surrendered himself, but he was not returned to prison. Reported on May 19, 2008, Elbaneh was jailed in Yemen after an appeals court upheld his 10-year prison sentence.

In November 2008, Yemen's appeal court reduced Elbaneh's sentence from 10 years to 5 because he surrendered to authorities.

== See also ==
- Buffalo Six
- Detroit Sleeper Cell
