= Amer el-Maati =

Kuwaiti-Canadian al-Qaeda member (born 1963)

- Born: May 25, 1963 (age 63); Kuwait

Amro Badr Eldin Abou el-Maati (born May 25, 1963 in Kuwait; also known as Amer el-Maati) is a Kuwaiti-Canadian alleged member of al-Qaeda. He is wanted for questioning by the FBI for having attended flight school and having discussed hijacking a Canadian plane to fly into American buildings. He has been referred to as "Canada's most wanted terrorist".

El-Maati's brother was one of a number of Canadians illegally renditioned to Syria to face torture in the years following the September 11 attacks, ostensibly because of interest in Amer, although officials did not give any reason for their sudden interest and accusations against el-Maati.

The case against el-Maati appears to consist of documents addressed to him being found in an office used by al-Qaeda, although the reporter who found them insisted it was possible they had been stolen by the militant group to commit identity theft. Since then, his brother has questioned whether the false confessions he gave under torture played any role in Amer's continued branding as a "terrorist", despite the fact neither Canada nor the United States seem to have even issued an arrest warrant for him.

El-Maati's father has protested the vilification of both his sons, claiming they were being used by the Department of Homeland Security to keep fear and suspicion high in the United States, particularly against Canadian-Arabs. His opinions were echoed by Toronto cleric, Aly Hindy, who has known the family for years and claimed that the FBI's announcement was "laughable".

== Early life ==
The el-Maati family moved to Beirut, and both Amer and his brother were enrolled in a Catholic school. Amer immigrated to Montreal in 1981 with his father and brother, until his mother and sister arrived, and the family moved to Toronto, where he attended high school, before returning to Montreal for university.

According to the interrogation of Abdullah Khadr in Pakistan, el-Maati had worked as a carpet salesman after the Mujahideen had denied him a pension due to his 1992 brain injury following a car accident which prevented him from participating in long treks.

In 1996, el-Maati travelled to Surobi to find his younger brother who had spent four years fighting alongside Gulbuddin Hekmatyar against the Taliban. The pair retreated north with Hekmatyar's forces, and then Ahmad went to Tehran to visit their mother and sister, while el-Maati traveled to Peshawar where he began working for the NGO Health and Education Projects International, created by Ahmed Khadr.

In 1998, he obtained a Canadian passport while living in Pakistan. Khadr's son Abdurahman testified in Montreal in the summer of 2004 that el-Maati had given his Canadian passport to a man known as Idriss.

His family claims to have last seen him in 1999, and to have received only a single email from him the following year, showing photographs of the school where he was working for the Canadian Relief Foundation.

== After 9/11 ==
Listed among 345 people wanted "for questioning" following 9/11, el-Maati was allegedly seen leaving Toronto on November 9, 2001, although his family maintains they did not see him at that time. He is alleged to have traveled to Afghanistan to help to repel the US-led invasion.

On November 17, 2001, The New York Times reporter David Rohde gleaned the location of an abandoned "al-Qaeda office" in Kabul from local Afghans - and reported finding documents belonging to el-Maati, including his 1996 citizenship acceptance letter with his Toronto address and his Toronto General Hospital card. The Royal Canadian Mounted Police investigated the office, claiming it had been found by the Northern Alliance, and reported they had found the office, which also contained business cards reading "4-U Enterprises - Amr H. Hamed" with the address for a rented postal box in a British Columbia convenience store. Rohde reported that el-Maati's identity may have been stolen by al-Qaeda agents looking for an innocent Canadian to impersonate, but the RCMP informed the Americans, who placed Amer on the FBI Seeking Information - War on Terrorism list, "being sought in connection with possible terrorist threats against the United States."

That month, his younger brother Ahmed was arrested while crossing into the United States. Although he was never charged with a crime, he was falsely imprisoned and tortured for more than two years in a Syrian prison, with the tacit approval of the Canadian government. Syrian interrogators claimed that Amer had been responsible for his brother's flight training, wanting to recruit him into al-Qaeda, and when Ahmed protested that he had abandoned his air taxi career aspirations after discovering he was afraid of flying, they stated that Amer had told him to prepare for a truck bombing instead. Ahmed gave a false confession under torture, stating that Amer had suggested he bomb the Embassy of the United States in Ottawa but that he personally wanted to bomb Parliament Hill. He refused to make any written statement, wishing to avoid bringing harm to his family, but was beaten and forced to put a thumbprint on a confession they drafted for him. He was then asked to work for his captors, and go find Amer in Afghanistan.

In December 2001, CSIS agents Adrian White and Rob Cassolato turned up at the el-Maati home in Toronto, asking the family patriarch to reveal his sons' locations. In December 2002, the television program America's Most Wanted featured Amer, stating that he was an airline pilot who may have "snuck back into the U.S" to work with Al-Qaeda sleeper cells.

Mr. Williams' allegations about McMaster [are] on par a par with UFO reports and JFK conspiracy theories...that notion that because there are people on faculty from Egypt that McMaster is then a haven for terrorism is not only logically offensive, it smack of racism.

— Lawyer Peter Downard

In October, FBI consultant Paul L. Williams wrote a book Dunces of Doomsday in which he claimed that Amer el-Maati, Adnan Shukrijumah, Jaber A. Elbaneh and Anas al-Liby had all been seen around Hamilton, Ontario the previous year, and that Shukrijumah had been seen at McMaster University where he "wasted no time in gaining access to the nuclear reactor and stealing more than 180 pounds of nuclear material for the creation of radiological bombs". He was subsequently sued by the University for libel, as there was no evidence to support these allegations. The publisher later apologized for allowing Williams to print statements which "were without basis in fact".

Around this time, the FBI had received a tip that a couple resembling el-Maati and Aafia Siddiqui had been seen filming tourist sites around Niagara Falls.

In January 2004, State Security officials in Giza, Egypt again interrogated his brother Ahmad, demanding to know where Amer was hiding. On January 12, 2004, State Security offered to release Ahmad to his family if they would give up the location of Amer. Their mother protested that she didn't know where Amer was, and Ahmad was released the following day.

On May 26, 2004, United States Attorney General John Ashcroft and FBI Director Robert Mueller announced that reports indicated that el-Maati was one of seven Al-Qaeda members who were planning a terrorist action for the summer or fall of 2004. Others listed on that date were Ahmed Khalfan Ghailani, Fazul Abdullah Mohammed, Aafia Siddiqui, Adam Yahiye Gadahn, Abderraouf Jdey, and Adnan Gulshair el Shukrijumah. The announcement prompted Canadian Prime Minister Paul Martin to announce that neither el-Maati nor Abderraouf Jdey had been in the country in "a while". American Democrats labeled the warning "suspicious" and said it was held solely to divert attention from President Bush's plummeting poll numbers and to push the failings of the Invasion of Iraq off the front page. CSIS director Reid Morden voiced similar concerns, saying it seemed more like "election year" politics, than an actual threat – and The New York Times pointed out that one day before the announcement, they had been told by the Department of Homeland Security that there were no current risks.

On August 21, 2004, The Inquirer and Mirror newspaper reported a "possible sighting" of Amer at the Nantucket Memorial Airport, and his photo was distributed to local security and transit workers.

That year, his family reported hearing rumors that Amer had been killed in the opening months of the Afghanistan War three years earlier.

In May 2005, the Canadian Security Intelligence Service again visited the el-Maati family, demanding to know where Amer was hiding and suggesting that his family should persuade him to turn himself into Canadian authorities rather than risk worse treatment at the hands of Afghan, Pakistani or American captors, to which they protested that they had not heard from him in five years.

== See also ==
- List of fugitives from justice who disappeared
