= Jafar al-Tayar =

Jafar al-Tayar may refer to:

- Ja`far bin Abī Tālib (died 629), also known as Ja‘far at-Tayyār, son of Abu Talib ibn 'Abdul Muttalib
- Guishar El Shukrijumah, also known as Jafar al-Tayar, alleged member of al-Qaeda
