= Sleeper cell (disambiguation) =

A sleeper cell is a dormant unit in a clandestine cell system.

Sleeper Cell(s) also may refer to:

- Sleeper Cell (TV series), a 2005 Showtime series
- "Sleeper Cells", a 2009 episode of the TV series Monsters Inside Me
- "Sleeper Cell", a song on the 2008 collaborative hip hop album Pain Language
- "Sleeper Cell", a song by the American industrial band Caustic

== See also ==
- Sleeper agent, a spy who is placed in a target country or organization to act as a potential asset if activated
- Detroit Sleeper Cell, a group of men who the United States Department of Justice believed were plotting an attack on Disneyland
