= Scott L. Fenstermaker =

American criminal defense lawyer

Scott L. Fenstermaker is an American criminal defense lawyer based in New York City, known for his work on behalf of Guantanamo Bay detainees.

== Education ==
Fenstermaker received a Bachelor of Science from the United States Air Force Academy in 1984 and a Juris Doctor from Harvard Law School in 1992.

== Legal career ==
Fenstermaker is notable for volunteering to serve detainees at Guantanamo Bay detention camp in their attempts to access the U.S. justice system. According to the American Lawyer magazine, there are insufficient lawyers with experience defending death sentence cases to assist the Guantanamo detainees charged with capital offenses.

In a series of court documents Fenstermaker described difficulties meeting with, and corresponding with Guantanamo detainees.

He described writing to, and receiving authorization to serve as the counsel for two of the fourteen "high value detainees" transferred to military custody in Guantanamo from covert detention in the CIA's network of black sites in September 2006.

On June 1, 2009, the New York Times published an article about the dispute over who was going to represent Ahmed Ghailani, the first Guantanamo detainee to be transferred from military custody to face trial in the US civilian court system. According to the article Judge Kevin Thomas Duffy ordered an explanation from Fenstermaker as to how he became Ghailani's lawyer.

=== Civil Action No. 08-cv-1085 ===
Civil Action No. 08-cv-1085 is a writ of habeas corpus filed after the U.S. Supreme Court ruling in Boumediene v. Bush.

Fenstermaker and another team of lawyers have both filed petitions on behalf of Rahim Al Nashiri—one of the fourteen "high value detainees" transferred from CIA's network of secret interrogation centers known as "black site."

On October 3, 2008 Judge Thomas F. Hogan ordered Fenstermaker to show cause why the petition he filed on behalf of Al Nashiri shouldn't be dismissed, as a duplication of Civil Action No. 08-cv-1207. Hogan wrote that 08-cv-1207, filed on behalf of Al Nashiri by lawyers in the office of the Nevada Public Defender had been directly authorized, whereas Fenstermaker's was not. Fenstermaker replied that he had a longer history with Al Nashiri than the Nevada lawyers and that he had letters authorizing him to act on behalf of Al-Nashiri, whereas the Nevada lawyers do not.

On January 6, 2009, Fenstermaker submitted a "proposed order" to Thomas F. Hogan. The proposed order would have ordered the Department of Defense to stop interfering with Fenstermaker's ability to communicate with Ammar Al Baluchi and Mustafa Bin Ammad Al Hawsawi, and to allow Fenstermaker to travel to Guantanamo to meet with them. On January 13, 2009, Hogan issued the order that Fenstermaker had proposed.

On March 25, 2009, Fenstermaker filed a "preliminary statement" in Ammar al-Baluchi v. Robert Gates. His statement was a response to a March 2, 2009, filing from the Department of Justice which they called an "Opposition to motion to file a document under seal". Fenstermaker said that Al Baluchi had authorized him to serve as his attorney in a letter he drafted on May 26, 2008, but that the letter had not reached him until August 2008.

Fenstermaker told the court that he still hadn't been allowed to meet with Al Baluchi, that physical letters were the only way he and Al Baluchi had communicated, and that since July 2008 the Department of Defense had been returning his letters to him, rather than delivering them. Consequently, he told the court, Al Baluchi was unaware of the activities he was taking on his behalf. Fenstermaker told the court that the new letter of authorization the Department of Justice was arguing he should be required to file was not reasonable, since the Department of Defense was interfering with his ability to send and receive mail with Al Baluchi.

=== Criminal charges and suspension ===
In November 2022, Fenstermaker was charged with trespassing, assault, reckless conduct, and attempted theft. He moved to Maine and was suspended from the practice of law for three years in March of 2024.
