= David B. Woods =

US Navy admiral

David Woods
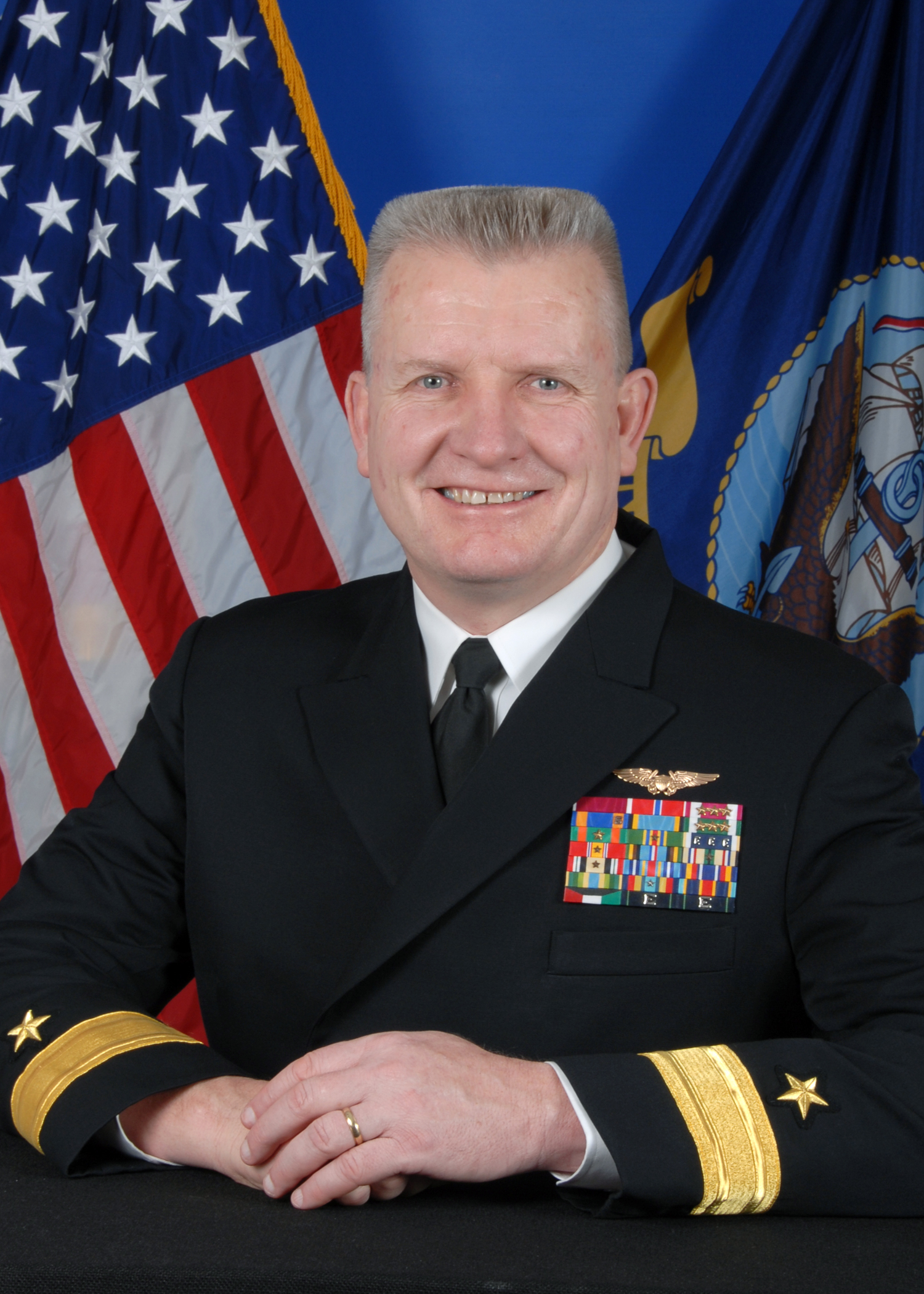
- Military career
- Branch: United States Navy
- Rank: Rear Admiral (lower half)
- Commands: VAQ-132; VAQ-129; CVW-11; Joint Task Force Guantanamo; Strike Force Training Pacific
- Awards: Defense Superior Service Medal; Legion of Merit (two awards); Bronze Star

Rear Admiral (lower half) David B. Woods is an officer in the United States Navy. When Woods was a junior officer he served as a fighter pilot. When he became more senior he specialized in signals intelligence.

Woods tried to impose new, restrictive, monitoring on the privileged attorney-client communication between lawyers defending Guantanamo captives and their clients.

In June 2013 documents were made public which had been filed by lawyers for those facing charges before the Guantanamo Military Commissions that challenged Woods's authority to control the clothing their clients wore to court. Woods had claimed the clothing he prohibited was, alternatively: (1) "unsafe"; (2) "culturally inappropriate" or (3) "disruptive".

They had previously challenged his authority to order subordinates to read the privileged attorney-client correspondence.

According to Josh Gerstein, in Politico, Woods had ″clashes″ with officers serving as defense attorneys, including Jeffrey Colwell, with the Office of Military Commissions, which led to Woods's early replacement. Woods served close to a year at JTF and left in 2012, and then was assigned Commander, Strike Force Training Pacific.
