= Adnan Gulshair el Shukrijumah =

Saudi-American Al-Qaeda member (1975–2014)

- عدنان شكري جمعة
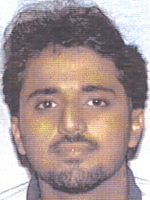
- Adnan Shukrijumah in 2001
- Born: Adnan Gulshair el Shukrijumah; 4 August 1975; Saudi Arabia
- Died: 6 December 2014 (aged 39); S. Waziristan, FATA, Pakistan
- Cause of death: Killed by Pakistan Army Special Services Group as part of the Operation Zarb-e-Azb
- Education: Broward Community College; South Florida University
- Occupations: Computer engineer Computer technician Al-Qaeda; Terrorist

Adnan Gulshair el Shukrijumah (Arabic: عدنان شكري جمعة, ʿAdnān Shukrī Jumaʿah) (4 August 1975 – 6 December 2014) was a citizen of Guyana and Saudi Arabia and a senior member of Al-Qaeda. He was born in Saudi Arabia and grew up in the United States.

In March 2003, a provisional arrest warrant was issued calling him a "material witness", and he was subsequently listed by the U.S. Federal Bureau of Investigation (FBI) on the Seeking Information - War on Terrorism list, and the United States Department of State, through the Rewards for Justice Program, offered a bounty of up to US$5 million for information about his location.

Last known to have lived with his family in Miramar, Florida, Shukrijumah was known to have a Guyanese passport but might also have used a Saudi, Canadian, or Trinidadian passport. Saudi Arabia has repeatedly denied that el Shukrijumah was a Saudi citizen. He was considered to be a high-ranking member of al-Qaeda.

His mother insisted that her asthmatic son had been wrongly accused. He also went by the names Abu Arif, and Jafar al-Tayyar, the latter translating to "Jafar the Pilot".

In 2014, Shukrijumah was killed in a military manhunt operation by Pakistan Army Special Forces in South Waziristan. The Pakistani Taliban confirmed Shukrijumah's death two days later. Al-Qaeda confirmed Shukrijumah's death in July 2016.

== Early years ==
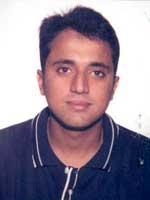
Adnan G. El Shukrijumah

Shukriumah moved to the United States in the 1980s as a young teenager with his parents. His mother Zuhrah Abdu Ahmed still resides in Florida, while his father died following a career as an imam. In 2001, his father had attracted the interest of officials, as the Saudi embassy had sent him $19,200.

Shukrijumah learned English later in his youth. As a young adult in 1997, he attended "English as a Second Language" classes. The FBI obtained a videotape of Adnan G. El Shukrijumah from the period that shows him giving a presentation exercise to the class, in which he speaks at length on the subject of jump starting a car. U.S. authorities believe that he may have been trained at an Afghan training camp in the late 1990s. He is alleged to have received assistance from American neuroscientist Aafia Siddiqui. Shukrijumah enrolled at Broward Community College, and earned money on the side working as a freelance computer technician. Shukrijumah applied for a green card so as to have his permanent residence status in the United States recognized, but lied on his application about having ever been arrested in the past.

In March 2001, while investigating Imran Mandhai, who attended the same Florida mosque as Shukrijumah, authorities made a note that Mandhai had eyed Shukrijumah as a potential colleague in whom to confide his plans, although Shukrijumah had refused to associate with the militant Mandhai. Reports would later accuse Mandhai of plotting to destroy Mount Rushmore.

Shukrijumah left the United States in May 2001 and flew to Trinidad after receiving his degree in computer engineering. However Mandhai's testimony in court would indicate that he believed he had last seen Shukrijumah two months after his stated departure. Authorities tried to speak with Shukrijumah, appearing unannounced at his parents' home six times asking if he was available - only to be told that he had left the country.

Under torture, Jose Padilla claims to have been partnered with Shukrijumah in the summer of 2001, and that the pair were taught how to seal natural gas into apartment complexes and detonate explosives in a course they received at the Kandahar airport. Padilla claims that the two men constantly fought, and he eventually went to Mohammed Atef to complain that he could not work with Shukrijumah and the training was canceled.

In late 2002, Shukrijumah phoned his parents to tell them that he had found a wife, settled down and had a son, and was now teaching English in Morocco.

== 2003 worldwide alert ==
In March 2003, his family's Florida home was the subject of an FBI search which yielded no evidence of his location. A bulletin was released suggesting that he was wanted as a terrorist and posed a "grave danger" to "gas stations, fuel trucks, subway systems, trains, or bridges". A number of "sightings" were reported across the country - including at a sandwich shop in south Tampa.

In September 2003, the FBI issued an alert for four people they alleged "pose a threat to U.S. citizens", including Abderraouf Jdey, Shukrijumah and the previously unknown Zubayr al-Rimi and Karim el-Mejjati.

Mr. Williams' allegations about McMaster [are] on a par with UFO reports and JFK conspiracy theories...the notion that because there are people on the faculty from Egypt that McMaster is then a haven for terrorism is not only logically offensive, it smacks of racism.

— Lawyer Peter Downard

In October, author Paul Williams wrote a book titled Dunces of Doomsday in which he claimed that Amer el-Maati, Jaber A. Elbaneh and Anas al-Liby had all been seen around Hamilton, Ontario the previous year, and that Shukrijumah had been seen at McMaster University where he "wasted no time in gaining access to the nuclear reactor and stealing more than 180 lb (82 kg) of nuclear material for the creation of radiological bombs". He was subsequently sued by the university for libel, as there had been no evidence to suggest any part of his story was true. The publisher later apologised for allowing Williams to print statements which "were without basis in fact".

== Summer 2004 terror alert ==
On 26 May 2004, United States Attorney General John Ashcroft and FBI Director Robert Mueller announced that reports indicated that el Shukrijumah was one of seven al-Qaeda members who were planning terrorist actions for the summer or fall of 2004. The other alleged terrorists listed on that date were Ahmed Khalfan Ghailani (who was later captured in Pakistan), Fazul Abdullah Mohammed, and Amer el-Maati, Aafia Siddiqui, Adam Yahiye Gadahn, and Abderraouf Jdey. The first two had been listed as FBI Most Wanted Terrorists since 2001, indicted for their roles in the 1998 U.S. embassy bombings. Jdey had already been on the FBI's "Seeking Information" wanted list since inception on 17 January 2002, to which Shukrijumah had also been later added, and the other three as well. American Democrats labeled the warning "suspicious" and said it was held solely to divert attention from President Bush's plummeting poll numbers and to push the failings of the Invasion of Iraq off the front page. CSIS director Reid Morden voiced similar concerns, saying it seemed more like "election year" politics, than an actual threat - and The New York Times pointed out that one day before the announcement, they had been told by the Department of Homeland Security that there were no current risks.

Ashcroft alleged that Shukrijumah had specifically "scouted sites" in New York City and around the Panama Canal for possible terrorist attacks. On 30 June, it was announced by the Honduran Security Ministry that el Shukrijumah had been in Honduras during the previous month meeting with members of the Mara Salvatrucha street gang. That September, the Aviation Security Association claimed that a Japanese flight attendant had confronted Shukrijumah while he had been acting strangely at Kansai International Airport. In June 2007, the New York Post claimed that Shukrijumah was "Al Qaeda's operations leader on a nuclear terror plot targeting the United States" stating that Osama bin Laden had chosen him "to detonate nuclear bombs simultaneously in several U.S. cities."

== Identified ==
A 2006 Summary of the High Value Terrorist Detainee Program, from the office of the Director of National Intelligence, asserted that Jafar al-Tayyar was identified as el Shukrijumah by waterboarded captive Abu Zubaydah. Khalid Shaikh Mohammad, after also being waterboarded, was shown a photograph of Shukijumah and agreed it was Jafar al-Tayyar. Other captives held at Guantanamo Bay detention camp had stated that another man, whose photograph they identified from a collection, was Jafar al-Tayyar although the American authorities discarded their claims.

== Linked to Najibullah Zazi plot and put on the FBI most wanted terrorists list ==
In June 2010, anonymous U.S. counter-terrorism officials told the Associated Press that Najibullah Zazi, who was arrested in September 2009 on charges that he planned to suicide bomb the New York City Subway system, had met with Shukrijumah in a camp in Pakistan. On 8 July 2010, he was put on the FBI Most Wanted Terrorists list.

== External operations council ==
Shukrijumah and two other leaders were part of an "external operations council" that designed and approved terrorism plots and recruits, but his two counterparts were killed in U.S. drone attacks, leaving Shukrijumah as the de facto chief and successor to Mohammed – his former boss. "He would be equated with being chief of operations," FBI special agent Brian LeBlanc told the US news network, adding that investigators believed Shukrijumah was "extremely dangerous."

However, according to the Long War Journal, Shukrijumah was al-Qaeda's operations chief for North America.

== Death ==
On 6 December 2014, Pakistani special forces killed Shukrijumah during a targeted operation in the Wana Subdivision of South Waziristan Tribal District during Operation Zarb-e-Azb.
