= Ahmed Ghailani =

Islamist terrorist; member of al-Qaeda (born 1974)

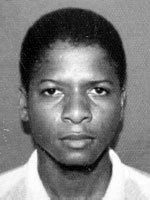
- Ahmed Khalfan Ghailani (FBI photo)
- Born: March 14, 1974 (age 52); Zanzibar, Tanzania
- Organization: Al-Qaeda
- Spouse: Married
- Status: Incarcerated
- Conviction: Conspiracy to destroy buildings and property of the United States resulting in death
- Penalty: Life imprisonment

Details
- Date apprehended: July 25, 2004, in Gujrat, Pakistan
- Imprisoned at: USP McCreary

Ahmed Khalfan Ghailani (Arabic: أحمد خلفان الغيلاني, Aḥmad Khalifān al-Ghaīlānī; born March 14, 1974) is a Tanzanian conspirator of the al-Qaeda terrorist organization convicted for his role in the bombing of embassies in Kenya and Tanzania. He was indicted in the United States as a participant in the 1998 U.S. embassy bombings. He was on the FBI Most Wanted Terrorists list from its inception in October 2001. In 2004, he was captured and detained by Pakistani forces in a joint operation with the United States, and was held until June 9, 2009, at Guantanamo Bay detention camp; one of 14 Guantanamo detainees who had previously been held at secret locations abroad. According to The Washington Post, Ghailani told military officers he is contrite and claimed to be an exploited victim of al-Qaeda operatives.

Ghailani was transported from Guantanamo Bay to New York City to await trial in the United States District Court for the Southern District of New York in June 2009. When the case came to trial, the judge disallowed the testimony of a key witness. On November 17, 2010, a jury found him guilty of one count of conspiracy, but acquitted him of 284 other charges including all murder counts. Critics of the Obama administration said the verdict proves civilian courts cannot be trusted to prosecute terrorists since it shows a jury might acquit a defendant entirely. Supporters of the trial have said that the conviction and the stiff sentencing prove that the federal justice system works.

On January 25, 2011, U.S. District Judge Lewis A. Kaplan, the presiding judge in the case, sentenced Ghailani, believed to be 36 years old at the time, to life in prison for the bombing, stating that any suffering Ghailani experienced at the hands of the CIA or other agencies while in custody at Guantanamo Bay pales in comparison to the monumental tragedy of the bombings of the U.S. embassies in Kenya and Tanzania in 1998, which killed 224 people, including 12 Americans, and left thousands injured or otherwise impacted by the crimes. The attacks were one of the deadliest non-wartime incidents of international terrorism to affect the United States; they were on a scale not surpassed until the September 11 attacks three years later. Ghailani, who had said he was never involved and did not intend to kill anyone, had been portrayed as cooperating with investigators—yielding information wanted by investigators—and as remorseful by his defense counsel, but that argument of relative non-involvement or remorse was not accepted. He is the fifth person to be sentenced. Four others were sentenced to life in prison in a 2001 trial in Manhattan federal court. Osama bin Laden was also named in the indictment.

== Early life ==
Ghailani was born in 1974 in Zanzibar, Tanzania and is a Tanzanian citizen. He speaks Swahili and had served as a tabligh, a Muslim traveling preacher. The Denver Post printed a profile of Jeffrey Colwell, a former colonel in the United States Marine Corps, who had prepared to defend Ghailani, when he was in military custody. Colwell visited Ghailani's family in Tanzania, in addition to getting to know Ghailani himself. According to Colwell, "he was a young kid at that time who was sort of lured and used as a pawn."

== 1998 U.S. embassy bombings ==
After joining al-Qaeda, he became an explosives expert and was assigned to obtain the bomb components in Dar es Salaam according to convicted fellow Embassy bombing conspirators Mohammed Sadiq Odeh and Khalfan Khamis Mohamed. This role was complicated by the fact that Ghailani could not drive so whatever purchases were too large or heavy for his bicycle such as oxygen and acetylene tanks would have to be picked up by another person in a car. Ghailani was in Nairobi, Kenya by August 6, 1998, where he is thought to have rented a room at the Hilltop Hotel used for meetings by the bombers and flew to Karachi on a Kenya Airways flight before the bombs exploded. At some time in Pakistan or Afghanistan, he married an Uzbek.

== Wanted and arrest for terrorist activities ==
On May 26, 2004, United States Attorney General John Ashcroft and FBI Director Robert Mueller announced that reports indicated that Ghailani was one of seven al-Qaeda members who were planning a terrorist action for the summer or fall of 2004. The other alleged terrorists named on that date were Fazul Abdullah Mohammed, who had also been earlier listed with Ghailani by the FBI as a Most Wanted Terrorist for the 1998 embassy attack, and Abderraouf Jdey, Amer El-Maati, Aafia Siddiqui, Adam Yahiye Gadahn, and Adnan G. El Shukrijumah. Abderraouf Jdey was already on the FBI Seeking Information – War on Terrorism list since January 17, 2002, to which the other four were added as well.

American Democrats labeled the warning "suspicious". Dismissing the threat, they claimed it was solely to divert attention from President Bush's plummeting poll numbers and to push the failings of the Invasion of Iraq off the front page. CSIS director Reid Morden voiced similar concerns, saying it seemed more like "election year" politics, than an actual threat—and The New York Times pointed out that one day before the announcement, they had been told by the Department of Homeland Security that there were no current risks.

His arrest was made by the Intelligence Bureau Pakistan in a raid with police commandos. On July 25, 2004, a nearly eight-hour battle ensued in the town of Gujrat, Pakistan between security officials and terrorists. Ghailani and thirteen others, included his wife and children, were arrested. A police officer was wounded in the battle. Pakistani Interior Minister Makhdoom Faisal Saleh Hayat announced the capture of Ghailani on July 29, 2004. The US Government had offered a $5,000,000 USD bounty offered for information leading to the arrest of Ghailani.

Some press reports (including the American magazine New Republic) questioned whether the timing of the announcement of Ghailani's capture was politically motivated. The announcement was made just hours before U.S. Presidential candidate John Kerry was due to make his acceptance speech at the 2004 Democratic National Convention, an event at which a candidate usually receives a significant boost in the polls. Hayyat made the announcement after midnight local time, despite having apparently known Ghailiani's identity for some days beforehand. Pakistani officials denied there was any such motivation. Soon after the capture of Ghailani and the others with him, The Boston Globe, quoting a United Nations source, said that Ghailani was one of several al-Qaeda personnel who had been in Liberia around 2001, handling conflict diamonds under the protection of then-dictator Charles Taylor.

== Combatant Status Review ==
Ghailani was among the 60% of prisoners who participated in the tribunal hearings. A Summary of Evidence memo was prepared for the tribunal of each detainee. The Ghailani memo accused him of the following:

The Department of Defense announced on August 9, 2007, that all fourteen of the "high-value detainees" who had been transferred to Guantanamo from the CIA's black sites, had been officially classified as "enemy combatants". Although judges Peter Brownback and Keith J. Allred had ruled two months earlier that only "illegal enemy combatants" could face military commissions, the Department of Defense waived the qualifier and said that all fourteen men could now face charges before Guantanamo military commissions.

== Charged before a military commission ==
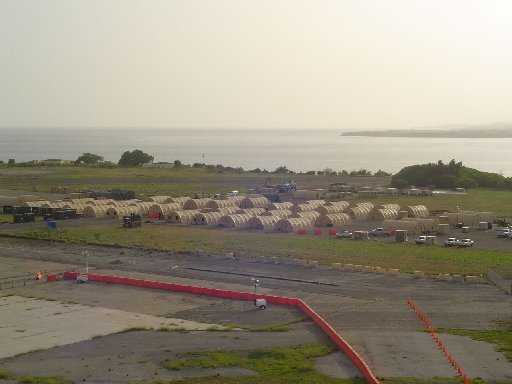
The Bush Presidency planned to hold up to 80 of the new Congressionally authorized Military Commissions in a $12 million tent city.

The al-Qaeda suspect alleged to have been involved in the 1998 United States embassy bombings that killed 223 people and injured approximately 4,085 faced nine war crimes charges, six of them offenses that could have carried the death penalty, if he was convicted by a military tribunal, it was reported on March 31, 2008. Scott L. Fenstermaker and David Remes were in a rare dispute as to who was authorized to assist Ghailani.

In June 2009, Ghailani was transferred to New York to face trial in a federal court. The Department of Justice, under U.S. Attorney General Eric Holder, directed the U.S. Attorney for the Southern District of New York, Preet Bharara, not to seek the death penalty in an October 2009 memorandum.

== Transfer to the United States ==
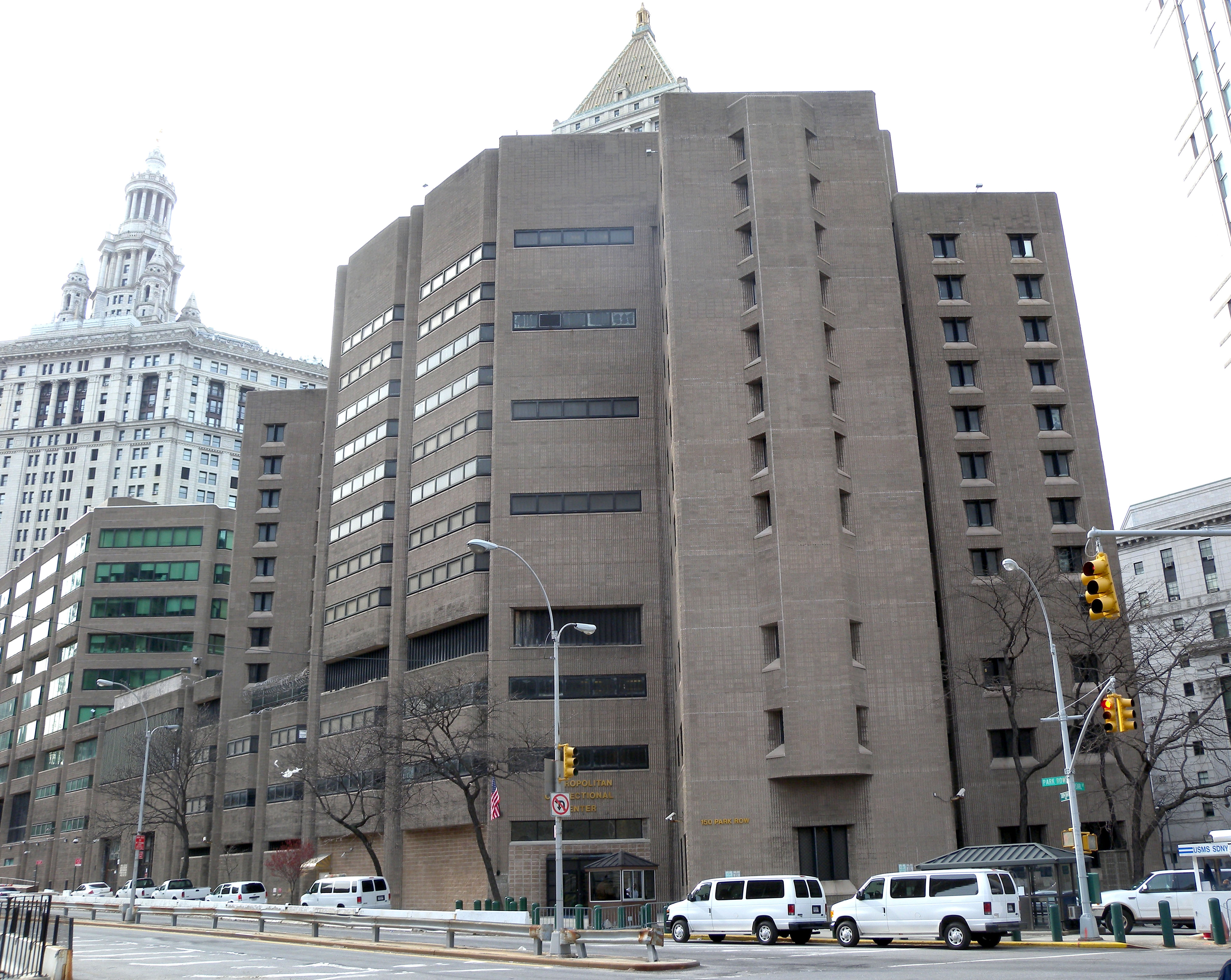
Metropolitan Correctional Center, New York City, where Ghailani was formerly located

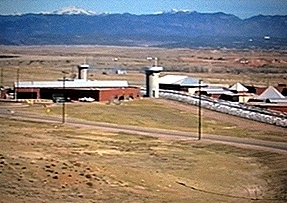
ADX Supermax where Ghailani was located until May of 2019.

On August 31, 2009, Corrections One, a trade journal for the prison industry, speculated that Ghailani was one of ten detainees they speculated might be moved to a maximum security prison in Standish, Michigan. Instead, Ghailani was transferred to New York City to stand trial in a civilian court there. He learned that being transferred from military to civilian jurisdiction meant that he could no longer be assisted by Colonel Jeffrey Colwell and Major Richard Reiter.

On February 10, 2010, United States district court Judge Lewis A. Kaplan ordered the Prosecution to review the record of Ghailani's detention in CIA's network of black sites. According to The New York Times, any materials that showed the decisions “were for a purpose other than national security” had to be turned over to Ghailani's lawyers. It was reported that Kaplan was considering dismissing the charges on the grounds that due to Ghailani's long extrajudicial detention he had been denied the constitutional right to a speedy trial.

On April 23, 2010, a 52-page unclassified summary of Ghailani's 2007 Guantanamo interrogations was published in preparation for his trial.

Benjamin Weiser, writing in The New York Times reported that the summary, published during Ghailani's civilian trial, revealed new details about his life as an Osama bin Laden bodyguard. According to Weiser, the interrogation summary asserted that during the year he was a bodyguard Ghailani met several other individuals who were among those who later became hijackers in the September 11 attacks. Following his work as a bodyguard, the summary asserts Ghailani became a forger, where he became "very good with Photoshop". Ghailani's trial commenced on October 4, 2010, in the Daniel Patrick Moynihan Federal Court Building in lower Manhattan, in front of U.S. District Court Judge Lewis A. Kaplan. There were no protests or demonstrations during the trial, as observed by Human Rights First.

On October 6, 2010, in a short ruling that the judge said he would expand upon later that day, it was determined that a key witness, the Tanzanian Hussein Abebe, who may have issued statements crucial to implicating Ghailani during the time he was under CIA custody, would not be testifying in the trial. Judge Kaplan agreed to delay the start of the trial until the following Tuesday, October 12, 2010, pending a possible appeal of that ruling. On October 11, 2010, the government announced it would not appeal Judge Kaplan's ruling. Steve Zissou, one of Ghailani's lawyers, commented that the government's decision not to appeal was "a significant victory for the Constitution".

On November 17, 2010, Ghailani was convicted of conspiracy, but acquitted of all the other charges. On January 25, 2011, Ghailani was sentenced to life in prison.

On May 10, 2019, Ghailani was transferred from ADX Florence in Colorado, to United States Penitentiary, McCreary, in Kentucky as BOP number 02476-748.
