= Jeffrey Colwell =

American lawyer

- Born: 1965 (age 60–61)
- Education: United States Naval Academy; Suffolk University (JD)
- Occupation: Lawyer
- Known for: Defended terrorist Ahmed Khalfan Ghailani

Jeffrey Colwell (born 1965) is an American lawyer, and retired colonel in the United States Marine Corps. Colwell served in the Marine Corps from his graduation from the United States Naval Academy in 1987 until his retirement in 2012. The Marine Corps sponsored Colwell to earn a J.D. degree at Suffolk University. After his retirement, he moved with his wife and two children to Denver, Colorado to become a court clerk.

Colwell served as the senior Defense attorney for Guantanamo captive Ahmed Ghailani, prior to his transfer to the US civilian justice system. He concluded that Ghailani "... was a young kid at that time who was sort of lured and used as a pawn." Ghailani wanted Colwell to help defend him in his civilian trial in 2009. This request was denied. He was appointed chief defense counsel in 2010.

In early 2011, Colwell, in his capacity as chief defense counsel, protested attempts to impose strict new rules on attorneys. Under the new rules attorneys would be required to inform camp authorities what language(s) they planned to use to communicate with their clients, and would have to get permission from the CIA before asking questions about confessions they allegedly made while confined in CIA black sites.

In late 2011 newly appointed camp commander David B. Woods ordered new, highly restrictive rules on lawyers' communications with their clients. Woods ordered defense attorneys to surrender for review all documents they wanted to share with their clients. Legal commentators suggested that lawyers who complied with the order were putting their license to practice law at risk, as violating attorney-client privilege was a career threatening ethical violation. Colwell ordered all defense attorneys to halt all communication with their clients, until Woods' order was withdrawn.
