= Richard Convertino =

American lawyer

Richard Convertino is a former federal prosecutor in Detroit, Michigan. Convertino was the lead Assistant U.S. Attorney in the "Detroit Sleeper Cell" prosecutions of Karim Koubriti and Abdel-Ilah Elmardoudi. However, the U.S. Department of Justice subsequently removed Convertino from his position and asked courts to dismiss those convictions, on the grounds that Convertino had failed to disclose evidence to which the defense was entitled.

== Overview ==
Federal charges were laid in the Detroit Sleeper Cell in September 2001, very shortly following the attacks of September 11, 2001. DOJ's prosecution in U.S. v. Koubriti alleged that an apparent holiday video five men made while visiting Disneyland was really a clandestine reconnaissance video, which would allow bomb experts to plan where to plant bombs. As lead prosecutor in the Koubriti case, Convertino argued that the five men were not the Westernized, secular Muslims they seemed. The government argued that they were "Takfiris"—radical jihadists who had a dispensation to drink alcohol, use narcotics and avoid praying, in order to blend into western societies, while secretly plotting clandestine attacks. Doubt was cast on the prosecution's case in U.S. v. Koubriti when it was alleged that the star witness, a member of the group who turned on the others, was a known con artist. Convertino had not disclosed this and other potentially exculpatory evidence to the defense.

On March 29, 2006, the Department of Justice (DOJ) announced criminal indictments for obstruction of justice against Convertino and Harry Raymond Smith, former security official assigned to the US Embassy in Amman, Jordan, who served as a government witness in U.S. v. Koubriti case.

Convertino has alleged that the DOJ disclosed other information to the news media that is protected by the Privacy Act in order to smear or discredit Convertino for his whistleblowing disclosures to the U.S. Senate Finance Committee.

== Prosecution and acquittal ==
Richard Convertino was charged with conspiracy to conceal possibly exculpatory evidence from the defense and lying to a Federal judge. Harry Smith III, formerly a U.S. Department of State investigator who had testified in the terrorism case prosecuted by Richard Convertino, was allegedly part of the conspiracy. Not turning the evidence over to the defense had led, at the government's request, to the court dismissal of the terrorism case prior to the charging of the case's prosecutor for the conspiracy. The jury acquitted the prosecutor and the investigator on October 31, 2007.

== Other cases ==
In 2002, Convertino prosecuted Ed Martin in relation to the University of Michigan basketball scandal.

== In the media ==
On May 30, 2008, radio show This American Life broadcast the Convertino's story, in relation to the conviction and subsequent retraction of U.S. vs. Koubriti. The show is entitled The Prosecutor.
