= Micah Zenko =

American political scientist

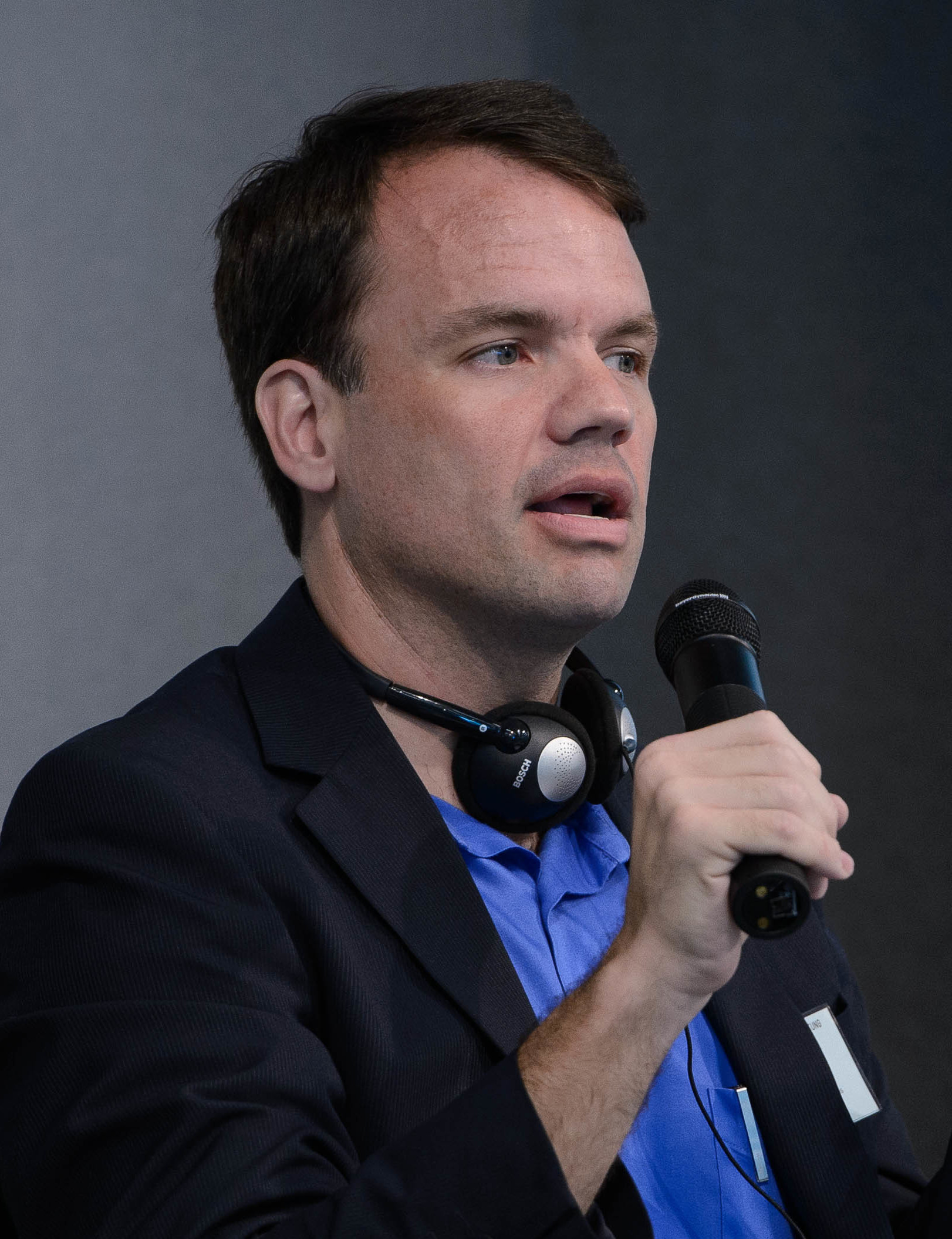
- Zenko in 2013
- Education: Brandeis University
- Occupation: Political scientist
- Known for: Senior Fellow at the Council on Foreign Relations

Micah Zenko is an American political scientist. He is Whitehead Senior Fellow on the US and Americas Programme at Chatham House. He is author of two books.

== Education ==
Micah Zenko earned a PhD from the Department of Politics at Brandeis University in 2009.

== Career ==
Zenko worked at Harvard University's Belfer Center for Science and International Affairs from 2003 to 2008, first as a research assistant to Graham T. Allison from 2003 to 2006, and a research associate on the Project on Managing The Atom from 2006 to 2008. He also worked at the Brookings Institution, the Congressional Research Service, and United States Department of State's Office of Policy Planning. He was a Senior Fellow at the Council on Foreign Relations until 2017. He has published articles in The Atlantic, The Guardian, Foreign Policy, and Business Insider.

Zenko has authored two books. His first book, Between Threats and War: U.S. Discrete Military Operations in the Post-Cold War World, was published in 2010. In a review for the Journal of Peace Research, Mark Naftalin criticized Zenko for leaving out an "analysis and contextualization of concepts, threats and legal and technological frameworks", adding that there was a "lack of rigorous detail in each of the author's policy recommendations." Zenko's second book, Red Team: How to Succeed By Thinking Like the Enemy, was published in 2015. A review in The Washington Post, Carlos Lozada wrote that "Zenko offers a compelling argument for forcing ourselves to think differently, which is ultimately the main purpose of a red team."

== Works ==
- Zenko, Micah (2010). Between Threats and War: U.S. Discrete Military Operations in the Post-Cold War World. Stanford, California: Stanford University Press. ISBN 9780804771900. OCLC 762141624.
- Zenko, Micah (2015). Red Team: How to Succeed By Thinking Like the Enemy. New York: Basic Books. ISBN 9780465073955. OCLC 927108312.
- Zenko, Micah; Cohen, Michael (2019). Clear and Present Safety: The World Has Never Been Better and Why That Matters to Americans. New Haven, CT: Yale University Press. ISBN 9780300222555.
