= Vehicle registration plates of Saudi Arabia =

Kingdom of Saudi Arabia
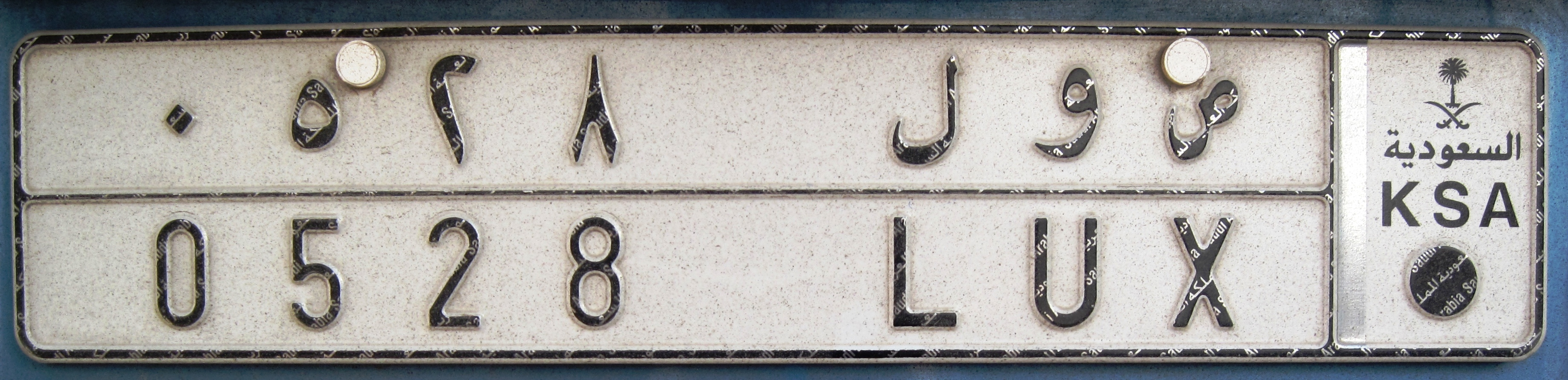
- Current regular legal standard number plate from Saudi Arabia.
- Country: Saudi Arabia
- Country code: KSA

Current series
- Size: 520 mm × 110 mm 20.5 in × 4.3 in
- Serial format: Not standard
- Colour (front): Black on white
- Colour (rear): Black on white

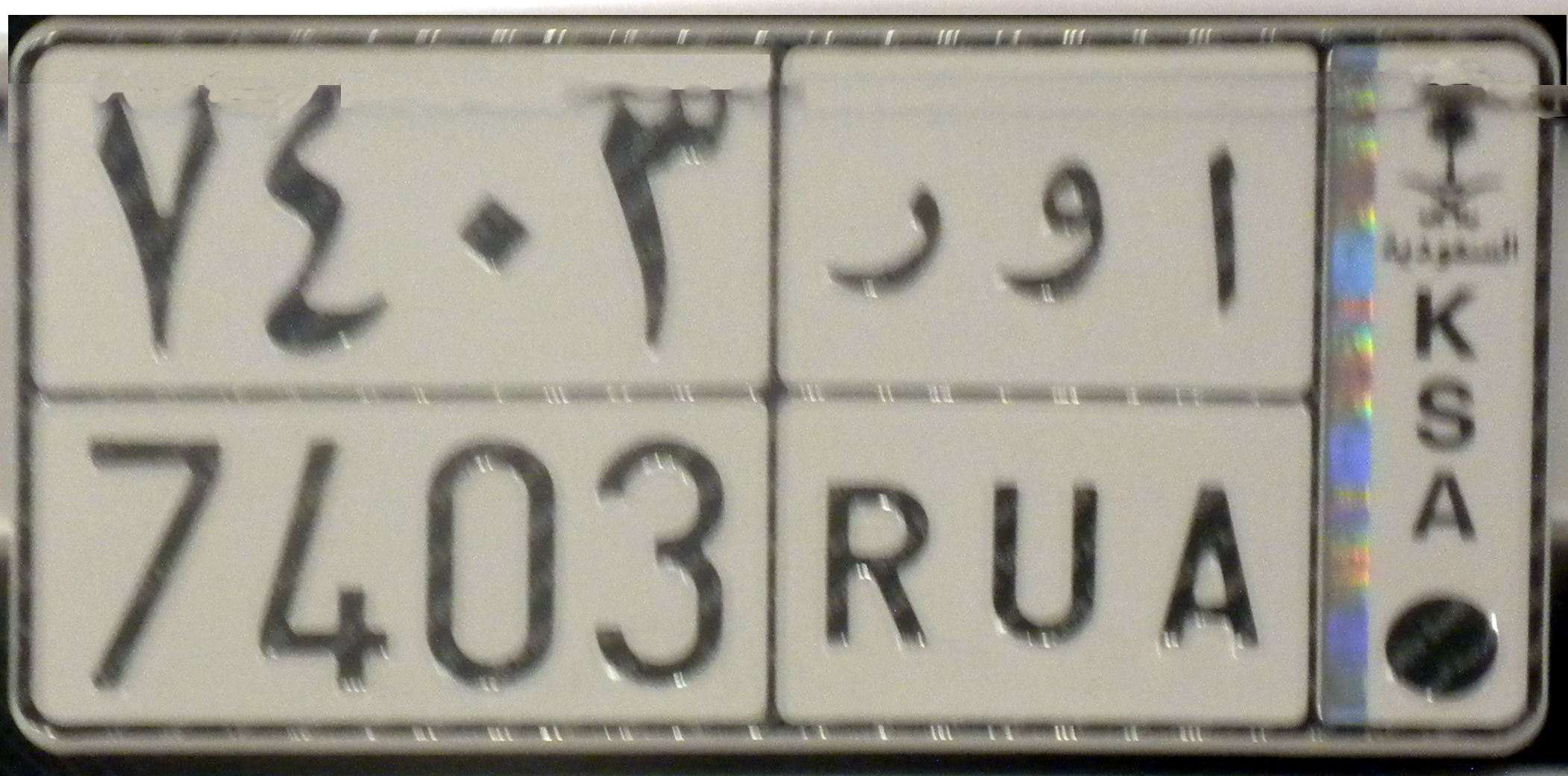
front plate

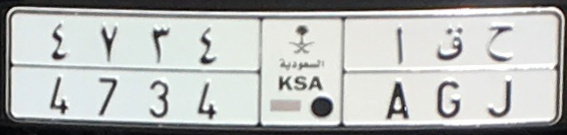
2014 style front plate

Vehicle registration plates of Saudi Arabia are manufactured by the Government Printing Press in Riyadh. Saudi Arabia has taken action to ensure that all people residing within its borders register their vehicles in Saudi Arabia and display a rear as well as a front license plate.

The plates consist of three letters and up to four numbers in Arabic. Both letters and numbers are also transliterated into the Latin alphabet and into the Western Arabic numerals, respectively. On the right side (or in the center since 2014), the plate contains the Saudi Arabia coat of arms and the international code KSA letters written vertically (horizontally since 2014). The lower sticker is the official seal. The standard plates always have four numbers and if necessary they are padded by zeroes. Personalised plates or earlier registrations may contain one, two or three numbers with or without zero padding. The transliteration into the Latin alphabet is done from left to right, although Arabic letters are read from right to left. Furthermore, the transliteration is not always correct. There are only 17 Arabic letters used on the registration plates.

== Overview ==
The following numerals and letters are used on Saudi registration plates.

Eastern Arabic numerals	Western Arabic numerals
٠	0
١	1
٢	2
٣	3
٤	4
٥	5
٦	6
٧	7
٨	8
٩	9

Arabic letters	Mapped Latin letters	Phonetic Transliteration
ا	A	a
ب	B	b
ح	J	ḥ
د	D	d
ر	R	r
س	S	s
ص	X	ṣ
ط	T	ṭ
ع	E	ʿ
ق	G	q
ك	K	k
ل	L	l
م	Z	m
ن	N	n
هـ	H	h
و	U	u
ى	V	á / ỳ

All plates have a white background, but several vehicle types may have a different background on the Strip which contains the coat of arms, the country name abbreviation and official seal. The strip is on the right hand side for 335x155 mm (US Size) License Plate. and in the middle for 550x110mm (EU Size) License Plate. Each type of license plate also has a symbol, such as a circle or a triangle, at the bottom of the strip. The US Size is the standard in the country. However, the EU Size is available if needed.

Strip	Meaning
	Emblem of Saudi Arabia
السعودية	as-Suʿūdiyya (Saudi in Arabic)
KSA	Kingdom of Saudi Arabia
● ▲ ▼ ◀	Car type symbol

== Types of plates ==
Type	335x155mm Plate (US Size)	550x110mm Plate (EU Size)	Notes
Private Cars			The strip on the plates for private cars is coloured white. The symbol at the bottom of the strip is a circle. The Saudi Police uses standard registration plates.
Public Transport			The strip on the plates for public transport and taxis is colored yellow. The symbol at the bottom of the strip is a triangle pointing up.
Commercial			The strip on the plates for trucks and utility vehicles is colored blue. The symbol at the bottom of the strip is a triangle pointing down.
Temporary			The strip on the plates for trucks and utility vehicles is colored silver. The symbol at the bottom of the strip is a triangle pointing left.
Diplomatic			The strip on the plates for diplomatic vehicles is colored green. The Saudi Coat of arms is surrounded by a white rectangle. There is no symbol at the bottom of the strip.

== Banned combinations ==
Some letter combinations were banned beginning in 2009, either for their Arabic or Latin translation. Examples include " 'S' 'E' 'X' " and " 'A' 'S' 'S' ". Around 90,000 plate combinations already in use were removed from circulation as some car owners had deliberately chosen offensive combinations.

== Former registration plates ==
The current plates were introduced in 2006. The former registration plates prior to 1996 used only 3 numbers and 3 letters with no translation. Even older license plates had a 7-number combination assigned to them, appearing in Arabic (International) and Hindi (East Arab) numerals. Above them was written Al-Saudia, in Arabic only. Numbers were sometimes padded by zeroes. Plates for trucks, public transport or diplomatic vehicles had a blue, yellow, or green background, respectively. The colors have been preserved in the current system, except that in the older system the entire plate had such a background.
