= Madhbah =

Madhbah مذبح
- Village
- Location in Yemen
- Coordinates: 15.37355°N 44.16436°E
- Country: Yemen
- Governorate: Amanat al-Asimah
- District: Bani al-Harith
- Elevation: 7,484 ft (2,281 m)
- Time zone: UTC+3 (Yemen Standard Time)

Madhbah (Arabic: مذبح Madhbaḥ), also called Madinat al-Layl or "the city of the night", is a suburb of Sanaa, Yemen, located in the Bani al-Harith District of Amanat al-Asimah Governorate.

== History ==
The first known mention of Madhbah in historical sources is in 799 AH (1397 CE), in Ghayat al-amani of Yahya ibn al-Husayn, where its name is spelled Mudhayyaḥ. The text describes Madhbah as a "well-known place to the west of the city of Sanaa", and relates an anecdote of a local shepherd finding a corpse in a cave there while he was pasturing his sheep.

The development of Madhbah as a suburb of Sanaa dates to 1991. Recent immigrants from the countryside, who came from various parts of the country but knew each other from having worked together in Saudi Arabia, set up an informal shantytown on the sides of two steep hillsides that had been military land. This happened during the night, hence the nickname "Madinat al-Layl", or "the city of the night". The government initially tried to bulldoze the settlement, but after a process of negotiation with the residents it acquiesced and ended up installing water and sanitation services. By 2008, Madhbah was described as a thriving suburb of Sanaa, with economic activities including warehousing, automotive services, and construction materials, and extensive investment from both the government and private real estate developers.
