= Kamal Derwish =

American fundamentalist islamist accidentally killed by CIA drone attack

- Undated photograph of Kamal Derwish, also known as Ahmed Hijazi
- Born: 1973; South Buffalo, New York, U.S.
- Died: November 3, 2002 (aged 28–29); Marib, Marib Governorate, Yemen
- Cause of death: 2002 Marib airstrike
- Citizenship: American

Kamal Derwish (Arabic: كمال درويش; 1973 – November 3, 2002) was an American citizen killed by the CIA as part of a covert targeted killing mission in Yemen on November 3, 2002. The CIA used an RQ-1 Predator drone to shoot a Hellfire missile, destroying the vehicle in which he was driving with five others.

Derwish had been closely linked to the growing religious fundamentalism of the Lackawanna Six, a group of Muslim-Americans who had attended lectures in his apartment near Buffalo, New York.

That an American citizen had been killed by the CIA without trial drew criticism. American authorities quickly back-pedaled on their stories celebrating the death of Derwish, instead noting they had been unaware he was in the car which they said had been targeted for its other occupants, including Abu Ali al-Harithi, believed to have played some role in the USS Cole bombing. According to former FBI agent Ali Soufan, Derwish was al-Harithi's main assistant.

== Life ==
Derwish was born at Mercy Hospital in South Buffalo, New York in 1973. He lived "on and off" in the suburb of Lackawanna near Buffalo, among the large Yemeni community in the area. His father moved the family to Saudi Arabia to look for work after he had lost his job working at Bethlehem Steel. His father died in a car accident three years later, leaving him to be raised by his relatives in Saudi Arabia. During his time in Saudi Arabia, Derwish became immersed in fundamentalist Wahhabist Islam. He reportedly returned to Lackawanna as a teenager before going back to Saudi Arabia.

During the 1990's Derwish moved to Sanaa, Yemen, attended al-Qaeda training camps in Afghanistan and fought in the Bosnian war alongside the mujahideen before returning to Saudi Arabia in 1997, where he was jailed for extremist activities and deported back to Yemen.

=== Return to Lackawanna ===
Derwish returned to his family house on Holland Avenue in Lackawanna in 1998, living with his aunt and uncle. He briefly worked for at a plastics factory in the area, but also frequently traveled to and from the Middle East through the next three years. He was visibly upset with the "decline" of the Buffalo suburb, noting how much the standard of living had fallen since his earlier days in the First Ward.

Locals described Derwish as having an "allure" which drew in young Yemeni-Americans who had difficulty reconciling their Muslim identities. He began giving informal talks at the local mosque late in the day, where he taught young attendants various things such as the Quran, "getting the kids to stay away from the streets, getting the kids to stay away from the corners, getting the kids to stay away from drugs." He later lived in the apartment of friend Yahya Goba, where he hosted congregations of 15 or 20 young men after evening prayers. They discussed Islam "for about 20 minutes" before engaging in other activities such as making jokes, ordering pizza or wrestling.

Though the size of them shrunk as they became more radical, Derwish developed a devoted following through his congregations over time. He often discussed the importance of jihad during his discussions to help the "oppressed people" in areas such as Palestine or Kashmir. He also spoke of his will to fight alongside the Taliban and his time fighting in Bosnia, and praised militant attacks such as the USS Cole bombing. He described the al-Qaeda camp he attended in Afghanistan as "exceptionally attractive" and promoted it as a way to attain "eternal salvation." He exploited the sins which the men had done as a catalyst for them to seek forgiveness.

In mid-April 2001, Juma al-Dossary, a militant who fought in Bosnia alongside Derwish, arrived in Lackawanna after having lived in Indiana for the previous six months. Dossary had given a "fiery sermon" at the Guidance Mosque in Lackawanna earlier in the year rallying against Arab governments.

== Targeted killing ==
On November 3, 2002, Derwish and al-Harithi were part of a convoy of vehicles moving through the Yemeni desert trying to meet someone, unaware that their contact was cooperating with US forces to lure them into a trap. As their driver spoke on satellite phone, trying to figure out why the two parties couldn't see each other if they were both at the rendezvous point, a Predator drone launched a Hellfire missile, killing everybody in the vehicle. CIA officers in Djibouti had received clearance for the attack from director George Tenet.

Derwish's uncle provided a DNA sample which showed that Derwish had been killed in the attack.

Since Yemen and Djibouti were not involved in the war on terror, and no attempt was made to arrest the men in the convoy before killing them, the attack was protested as an extrajudicial execution and a violation of human rights.

== See also ==
- CIA activities in Yemen
