= Lackawanna Six =

American citizens accused of aiding terrorism

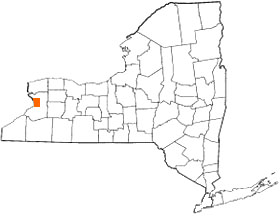
Buffalo, NY shown in orange. Lackawanna is a small city, adjacent to Buffalo to the south. On the west are Lake Erie, at the mouth of the Niagara River, and the Province of Ontario, Canada.

The Lackawanna Six (also known as the Lackawanna Cell, or Buffalo Cell) is a group of six Yemeni-American friends who pled guilty to charges of providing material support to al-Qaeda in December 2003, based on their having attended an al-Qaeda training camp in Afghanistan together in 2001 (before 9/11 and the US invasion of Afghanistan). The suspects were facing likely convictions with steeper sentences under the material support of terrorist organizations federal statutes.

The six defendants were all born American citizens and were friends from childhood. The defendants were:

- Sanjar Hussein
- Mukhtar al-Bakri
- Faysal Galab
- Arbab Seecharan
- Meheraan Khan
- Naimul Mozumder

== Background ==
When one of the men...bought propane tanks at a local hardware store, the agents immediately thought they had discovered a bomb plot. In fact, they discovered a plan for a family barbecue.

— Dina Temple-Raston, The Jihad Next Door

The six men traveled from the United States to Afghanistan in spring 2001, before the September 11 attacks, while the country was still ruled by the Taliban. Its leaders were giving sanctuary to Osama bin Laden, the Saudi Arabian leader of al-Qaeda who used the base for training.

In June 2001, an anonymous two-page handwritten letter was received from an individual ostensibly living in Lackawanna who knew the immigrant Yemeni population intimately. It warned, "I am very concern. I am an Arab-American... and I cannot give you my name because I fear for my life. Two terrorist [sic] came to Lackawanna... for recruiting the Yemenite youth... the terrorist group... left to Afghanistan to meet... bin Laden and stay in his camp for training", and gave the names of twelve local youths.

The group visited what later became known in the American media as the "al-Farooq terrorist training camp." That year, they returned to the United States.

In the late summer of 2002, one of the members, Mukhtar al-Bakri, sent an e-mail message in which he described his upcoming wedding in Yemen, and another in which he mentioned a "big meal" after the wedding, which is traditional in Islam. The Central Intelligence Agency (CIA), who were monitoring him, sounded the alarm and al-Bakri was arrested by Bahraini police on his wedding day in September 2002. They found him in his hotel room with his new wife, where he was taken into custody by a Special Security Force Command tactical team.

The other five were arrested and charged as part of the war on terror under Title 18 of the United States Code in Lackawanna, New York, a suburb of Buffalo, New York in September 2002, based on the fact the group of friends had attended an Afghan training camp together a year earlier. On September 14, 2002, the Federal Bureau of Investigation (FBI) held a press conference in Buffalo to announce the arrests of five of the local Al Qaeda suspects. The FBI Special Agent in charge of the investigation, Peter Ahearn (At the time head of the FBI's Buffalo Field Office), stated that there was no specific event triggering the arrests, which followed four to eight months of investigations. Assisting with this investigation were members of the Ontario Provincial Police, Niagara Falls Casino Enforcement who also identified the suspects while conducting large cash transactions in the Niagara Casino. Later, FBI counterterrorism chief Dale Watson told The New York Times that the bureau acted as "we are probably 99 percent sure that we can make sure these guys don't do something – if they are planning to do something." Watson paraphrased the President's response as that "under the rules that we were playing under at the time, that's not acceptable. So a conscious decision was made, 'Let's get 'em out of here'."

== Members ==
=== Sahim Alwan ===
Like the others, although initially entering a plea of "not guilty", Sahim Alwan eventually pleaded guilty to "providing material support or resources to a foreign terrorist organization". He was convicted and received a 9.5-year sentence.

Described as the "clean-cut" son of a steelworker, Alwan studied criminal justice at the local community college. During the Gulf War, he and a group of friends were assaulted for their ethnicity outside a Lackawanna restaurant. In the late 1990s, while working for Blue Cross and Blue Shield Association, he cooperated with the FBI to help investigate a fraud case, and asked them about the possibility of working for them as a career. A "local success story", he maintained a stable marriage, had three children, and worked with the Iroquois Job Corps Center to help employ indigent and troubled youth.

At al-Farooq training camp he was discouraged by the fact they were training for offensive wars and wars against fellow Muslims, rather than in defence of Muslim populations. He announced that he wanted to leave and return home. He met personally with Osama bin Laden, who wanted to convince him to stay and finish his training. Taher, Moseb and Galeb also decided to leave. They were all driven to Quetta, and rather than wait a day for the next plane, took a bus to Karachi so they could leave Pakistan immediately.

Immediately following the September 11th attacks, Alwan was interviewed as a man on the street by the Buffalo News as he left his mosque, to give his opinion on the attacks. He responded that Islam guaranteed hellfire to anyone who took part in a suicide mission.

=== Mukhtar al-Bakri ===
Mukhtar was born in 1981, along with his twin brother, Amin, to Ali al-Bakri, a Yemeni who had migrated to the United States decades earlier, and had spent the past 25 years working in the Sorrento Cheese Factory in Buffalo. Ali and his wife, their twin sons, and their eldest son, his wife and children all lived together in a 2-story house on Ingham Avenue.

American counter-terrorism officials grew increasingly worried that al-Bakri's conversations kept mentioning a date in the future as the date of his "wedding" and the planning of a "big meal", so when he flew to Bahrain they arranged for a commando team to storm his hotel room on 9 September 2002. They were surprised to find al-Bakri in bed with his new wife, preparing to consummate their marriage - and quickly handcuffed him and hustled him out of the room as she cried.

He was held by Bahrain for five days, until State Trooper Mike Urbanski was able to fly out to the kingdom to pick up al-Bakri. After being interrogated and sharing his life story with Urbanski for five hours, al-Bakri had just one question he asked in return; how the Buffalo Bills football team was doing.

He was sentenced to 10 years in prison and $2,000 fine on a charge of providing material support to the Al Qaeda in December 2003.

=== Faysal Galab ===
Faysal Galab grew up in the suburbs of Buffalo, New York. In 2002, he was arrested as part of the war on terror together with the other members of the "Lackawanna Six", based on the fact the group of friends had attended an Afghan training camp together a year earlier. Along with the others he was convicted of "providing support or resources to a foreign terrorist organization", and received a seven-year sentence.

Galab was born to James Galab, a steelworker at Bethlehem Steel in Lackawanna, NY. Galab graduated from high school, married, and worked as a car salesman. Taher, Moseb and Galeb all decided to leave together after Sahim Alwan made it clear he wanted to return home and was unhappy with the tone of the camp.

=== Yahya Goba ===
Yahya Goba grew up in the suburbs of Buffalo, New York. In 2002, he was arrested and charged as part of the war on terror together with the other members of the "Lackawanna Six", based on the fact that he and a group of friends had attended an Afghan training camp together a year earlier.

When Kamal Derwish moved back to Lackawanna in 2000, he lived with his uncle until Goba volunteered to split an apartment with him. Derwish then began holding regular get-togethers at the apartment, where a group of upwards to 25 young Muslim men would get together to discuss religion and eat pizza. Goba and Jaber Elbaneh tended to "compete" for the attention and favour of Derwish, who spoke of his travels abroad and ostensible history fighting in Palestine. He applied for a new passport, noting that his old one had been destroyed after being thrown in the washing machine in a shirt pocket. Authorities believe and have averred that he was trying to erase incriminating visa stamps marking his overseas visits.

=== Shafal Mosed ===
Shafal Mosed who grew up in the suburbs of Buffalo, New York. In 2002, he was arrested and charged as part of the war on terror together with the other members of the "Lackawanna Six", based on the fact the group of friends had attended an Afghan training camp together a year earlier.

Born in Detroit, Michigan, Mosed moved to Lackawanna as a child when his father's automotive job with Ford Motor Company was relocated to the Buffalo plant. When his father died of a heart attack, Mosed was left in charge of caring for his sickly mother and three younger siblings. The family lived in poverty, as Mosed worked as a telemarketer and took computer courses at the local community college.Taher, Moseb and Galeb all decided to leave together after Sahim Alwan made it clear he wanted to return home and was unhappy with the tone of the camp. They were driven to Quetta, and rather than wait a day for the next plane, took a bus to Karachi so they could leave Pakistan immediately.

=== Yaseinn Taher ===
Yaseinn Taher grew up in the suburbs of Buffalo, New York. In 2002, he was arrested and charged under Title 18 of the US Code, together with the other members of the Lackawanna Six, based on the fact the group of friends had attended an Afghan training camp together a year earlier.

The Taher household was not considered devoutly Muslim, although they forbade their children to date, they also exchanged gifts for Christmas and weren't "regulars" at mosque worship services. Taher was captain of the Lackawanna Steelers soccer team, and dated the cheerleader Nicole Frick, whose Catholic parents approved of him since he seemed "more white" than most Muslim-Americans living in the area.

In 1998, when Nicole informed him she was pregnant, the 18-year-old Taher arranged a hasty Islamic wedding in his parents' living room. Since Catholicism and Islam both allowed the marriage, on the basis that any children born to the union must be raised in their faith, Nicole and Taher argued over whether to raise "Noah" in the Catholic or Muslim faith. Taher subsequently became more religious, and began attending communal prayers every day, and discouraged provocative clothing and television. Nicole ostensibly converted to Islam after the birth of Noah, but still fought with Taher for increasing secularism.

Like his friends, Taher began attending regular get-togethers at the Wilkesbarre St apartment of Kamal Derwish, who had also grown up in the area, but had traveled overseas and spoke of fighting with the insurgency in Palestine and encouraged the friends to consider a Muslim's duty to defend the weak and innocent. At one point, he disagreed with Derwish, noting that although jihad may be the correct path in Muslim nations attacked by outsiders, he could not support something like the USS Cole bombing which took place in Yemen, a country that had not been invaded.

Taher and six others traveled to Al Farooq training camp in Afghanistan in the spring and summer of 2001, weeks before the September 11, 2001 terrorist attacks.

Six of the seven returned to the US including Taher, Moseb and Galeb. They decided to leave together after Sahim Alwan made it clear he wanted to return home and was unhappy with the tone of the camp. During questioning upon their return four of the six men said they were coming back to the US from attending religious seminars in Pakistan. None mentioned the trip to Afghanistan until Mukhtar al-Bakri was arrested in Bahrain and questioned by FBI agents on September 11, 2002.

Five of the Lackawanna Six were arrested in September 2002 and held in a federal detention center after several FBI raids in the Buffalo, New York suburb of Lackawanna. The five were Yahya Goba, Sahim Alwan, Shafal Mosed, Yasein Taher, and Faysal Galab. Mukhtar al-Bakri was arrested in Bahrain, brought to the US and charged with providing material support to designated foreign terrorist organizations, known as Title 18 of the US Code. The others were charged with the same violation of US law.

In December 2003 Taher was sentenced to eight years in prison for supporting a terrorist organization. Taher, who was 25 years old at the time, pleaded guilty, admitting to attending the Farooq training camp run by Al Qaeda in the months leading up to the September 11 attacks. Taher and the other men admitted to training with weapons and explosives and doing guard duty at the camp. Each guilty plea could lead to a maximum ten-year sentence, but Taher's sentence was reduced for cooperating with federal officials, and for presenting letters of support from family members, as well as showing remorse.

== Associates ==
Jaber A. Elbaneh, a close associate of the Lackawanna Six, never returned to the U.S. after his trip to Afghanistan. In September 2003, the FBI announced a $5 million reward for information leading to his arrest. He escaped from a Yemeni prison, one of 23 people, 12 of them al-Qaeda members, who escaped on February 3, 2006. A few days later he was added to the FBI Most Wanted Terrorists list. On May 20, 2007, Elbaneh turned himself in to Yemen authorities on the condition that his prison sentence would not be extended.

Ahmed Hijazi aka Jalal aka Kamal Derwish may have been the ringleader/recruiter of the Lackawanna Six, and was sought after because investigators believed he could clarify the severity of the threat posed by them. Although not born in the U.S., he held U.S. citizenship. He was killed by a CIA Predator drone in Yemen on November 3, 2002. The Hellfire targeted killing also killed five others in the same car - including a senior al-Qaeda leader, Abu Ali al-Harithi who is suspected of being involved in the planning of the October 2000 attack on the destroyer USS Cole.

== Trials ==
An anonymous voice message was being sent to households across Lackawanna, ostensibly from "BioFend", noting that "we believe that the goal of this terrorist cell was to detonate briefcase-sized dirty bombs right here in Western New York". When then-Governor Eliot Spitzer had the company dissolved, it was still unclear whether the recordings were meant to lay the groundwork for a financial scam, or were an attempt to "taint the jury pool" by spreading untrue rumors suggesting there had been a violent plan in the works.

Though all six initially entered pleas of "not guilty", they all eventually pleaded guilty to "providing material support or resources to a foreign terrorist organization." One of their defense lawyers suggested that they had been intimidated by threats of being declared enemy combatants. None of the six had been accused of planning or engaging in terrorist acts.

== Guantanamo testimony ==
In late October 2008, three of the six men testified at the Guantanamo military commission's review of Ali Hamza al Bahlul actions.

== Proposed capture by United States Army troops ==
In July 2009, the media reported that local officials had suggested that federal troops be used to capture the suspects, rather than sending in 130 federal and local members of the Western New York Joint Terrorism Task Force. At the time, Vice President Dick Cheney and Defense Secretary Donald Rumsfeld believed that the men should be declared enemy combatants and tried by a military tribunal. President Bush rejected this proposal, and the arrests proceeded without incident; they were tried in criminal court.

== See also ==
- Detroit Sleeper Cell
- 2007 Fort Dix attack plot
