= Detroit Sleeper Cell =

Men believed to be plotting an attack on Disneyland

The Detroit Sleeper Cell is a group of men of Middle-Eastern descent who the United States Department of Justice believed were plotting an attack on Disneyland.

== Trial ==
External videos
- The Detroit Sleeper Cell, Retro Report Voices, 11:43, Retro Report

While on a trip to Disneyland, the four men recorded a home video. The Justice Department believed that this recording was reconnaissance for a future terror attack. This video, combined with the testimony of self-described con-artist Youssef Hmimssa, and what the defense called doodles in a day planner, but the prosecution called terror plans, led to the conviction of two men on June 3, 2003.

The prosecution claimed the five were "Takfiris" — followers of a radical Islamic sect that allowed mujahideen to drink alcohol, use narcotics, and refrain from praying, in order to blend into Western societies, so they could mount clandestine attacks on them.

Youssef Hmimssa, who pleaded guilty to multiple charges of credit card fraud and identity theft, agreed to testify against the four men, in a deal that would allow him to consolidate his other charges, and avoid further charges, reducing his sentence to between 37 and 46 months in prison. Defense attorneys Joseph A. Niskar, James C. Thomas, James Gerometta, Richard Helfrick, William Swor, Margaret Raben, and Robert Morgan were assigned to represent each individual member of the group. However, the attorneys argued the case together.

== Post-trial ==
Later, the conviction of the two men was overturned by information indicating that the prosecution had withheld important information from the defense. In the Justice Department's filing they claimed there was "no reasonable prospect of winning," and "In its best light, the record would show that the prosecution committed a pattern of mistakes and oversights that deprived the defendants of discoverable evidence (including impeachment material) and created a record filled with misleading inferences that such material did not exist".

A federal grand jury is investigating whether the prosecution withheld information from the defense and deceived the jury. Richard Convertino, the lead prosecutor in the case, sued Attorney General John D. Ashcroft, accusing Ashcroft and others of mismanagement and retaliation, but the lawsuit was thrown out by a judge.

== See also ==
- Buffalo Six - A terror cell captured in Buffalo, New York, United States
- Saad Madai Saad al-Azmi - Guantanamo detainee also accused of being a Takfiri
- Naser Jason Abdo
