= Abu Anas al-Libi =

Libyan al-Qaeda member (1964–2015)

- Senior al-Qaeda suspect
- Born: Nazih Abdul-Hamed Nabih al-Ruqai'i; 1964; Tripoli, Kingdom of Libya
- Died: 2 January 2015 (aged 50); New York City, United States
- Other names: Nazih al Raghie, Anas al Sebai, Nazih Abdul Hamed Al-Raghie
- Children: 4

Nazih Abdul-Hamed Nabih al-Ruqai'i, (Note: Arabic: نزيه عبد الحميد نبيه الرقيعي Libyan pronunciation: [næˈziːh ˈʕæbdəl ħæˈmiːd næˈbiːh əlruˈqeːʕi]) known by the alias Abu Anas al-Libi (/ˈɑːbuː ˈɑːnɑːs ɑːl ˈliːbi/ AH-boo AH-nahs ahl LEE-bee; Arabic: ابو أنس الليبي Libyan pronunciation: [ˈæbu ˈʔænæs əlˈliːbi]; 1964 – 2 January 2015), was a Libyan under indictment in the United States for his part in the 1998 United States embassy bombings. He worked as a computer specialist for al-Qaeda. He was an ethnic Libyan, born in Tripoli.

His aliases in the indictment are Nazih al Raghie and Anas al Sebai. In the FBI and United States State Department wanted posters, another variant of his name is transliterated Nazih Abdul Hamed Al-Raghie.

The indictment accused al-Libi of surveillance of potential British, French, and Israeli targets in Nairobi, in addition to the American embassy in that city, as part of a conspiracy by al-Qaeda and Egyptian Islamic Jihad.

== Involvement with al-Qaeda ==
Al-Libi was believed to have been tied to al-Qaeda since its 1988 roots in Afghanistan. In 1995, al-Libi was granted political asylum in the United Kingdom, after a failed Al-Qaeda plot to assassinate Hosni Mubarak, then president of Egypt. An Egyptian request for extradition was declined on the grounds that al-Libi would not receive a fair trial. In 1996, MI6 allegedly paid a Libyan Al-Qaeda cell to kill Colonel Gaddafi. Al-Libi would have been allowed to stay in return for aiding the alleged plot, which was unsuccessful.

In 1999, al-Libi was arrested by Scotland Yard and interrogated. However, he was released because he had cleared his hard drive and no evidence could be found to hold him. He evaded a team that was sent to follow him and fled to Afghanistan. His flat in Manchester, where he was a student, was searched by police, who discovered a 180-page handwritten manual, translated from Arabic to English, which became known as the Manchester Manual.

Al-Libi spoke Arabic and English. He had a scar on the left side of his face. Because he was tall and bore a passing resemblance to Osama bin Laden, he was often used as a decoy when Bin Laden traveled.

== Conflicting reports of whereabouts ==
In January 2002, news reports stated that al-Libi had been captured by American forces in Afghanistan. In March 2002, it was reported that he had been arrested by the Sudanese government and was being held in a prison in Khartoum. U.S. officials soon denied those reports and al-Libi was still sought.

Al-Libi had been on the USA's list of Most Wanted Terrorists since its inception on 10 October 2001. The United States Department of State, through the Rewards for Justice Program, offered up to US$5,000,000 (formerly $25,000,000) for information about the location of Abu Anas al-Libi.

In February 2007, a Human Rights Watch document claimed that al-Libi and others "may have once been held" in secret detention by the CIA.

On 7 June 2007, al-Libi, who remained on the FBI Most Wanted Terrorists list, was listed as a possible CIA "secret prisoner" by Amnesty International, without providing details or evidence.

In September 2012, CNN reported that al-Libi returned to Libya after being imprisoned in Iran for seven years.

== Captured by the United States ==
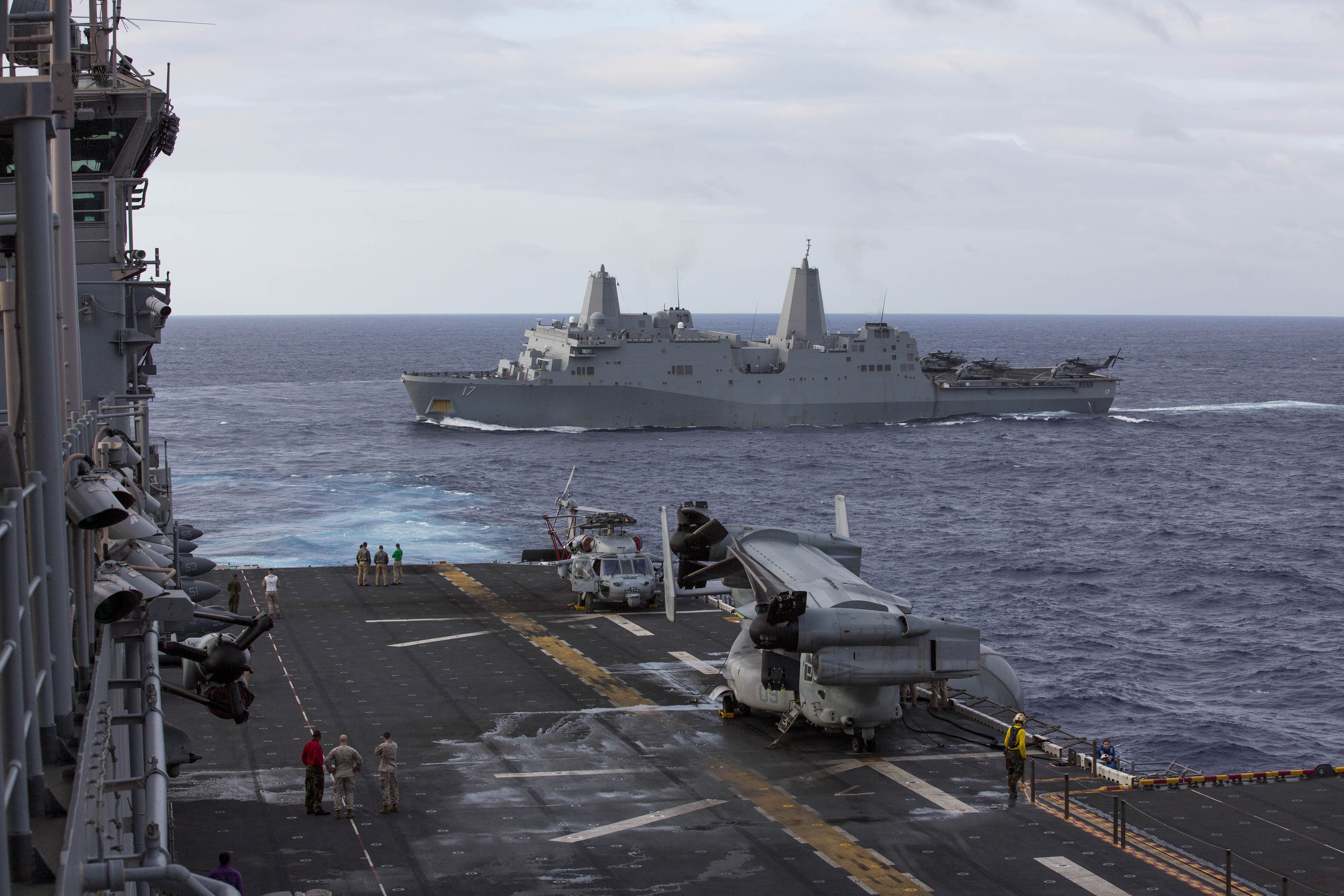
The USS San Antonio (LPD 17) in March 2013

Al-Libi was captured in Tripoli, Libya, on 5 October 2013 by U.S. Army Delta Force operators, with the assistance of FBI agents and CIA officers. He was seized in a pre-dawn raid and removed from Libya. The US Navy's DEVGRU conducted a simultaneous raid in Somalia targeting the alleged mastermind of the Westgate shopping mall attack in Kenya, possibly to avoid either action sending the other target into hiding. A day after Al-Libi was captured, he was in military custody on the ship USS San Antonio in the Mediterranean Sea. On 10 February 2014, a 30 seconds CCTV video showing U.S. commandos capturing al-Libi was published by The Washington Post.

=== Court appearance ===
On 15 October 2013, al-Libi appeared in a Manhattan federal court and pleaded not guilty to terrorism charges, including helping to plan the U.S. embassy bombings in Kenya and Tanzania. He was held without bail due to concerns that he was a flight risk and a danger to the community. His trial, along with his co-defendant Khalid al-Fawwaz, a.k.a. "Khaled Abdul Rahman Hamad al Fawwaz," a.k.a. "Abu Omar," a.k.a. "Hamad," was scheduled to begin on 3 November 2014, before Judge Lewis A. Kaplan.

He was scheduled to stand trial in New York on 12 January 2015.

== Death ==
Abu Anas Al-Libi died on 2 January 2015 at a hospital in New York, aged 50, while in the United States custody. He reportedly had liver disease as a result of hepatitis C, and liver cancer. Upon his death his wife said "I accuse the American government of kidnapping, mistreating, and killing an innocent man. He did nothing."

== Personal life ==
Al-Libi was married and the father of four boys. He was believed to have been connected to Ramadan Abedi, the father of Salman Abedi, the perpetrator of the Manchester Arena bombing.

== Aliases ==
Romanised	Arabic	Notes
Nazih Abdul-Hamed Nabih al-Ruqai'i	نزيه عبد الحمد نبيه الرقيعي	The surname is spelled الراجعي in the UN list.
Anas al-Libi	أنس الليبي	
Abu Anas al-Libi	أبو أنس الليبي	Some Arabic press reports referred to him by this name.
Anas al-Sebai	أنس السباعي	
Nazih Abdul-Hamed al-Raghie	نزيه عبد الحمد الراغي	
