= Abousfian Abdelrazik =

Sudanese-born Canadian dual citizen

- Born: January 1, 1962 (age 64)
- Other name: Abu Sufian Abd Al-Razziq
- Known for: Canadian government withheld travel documents allowing him to return to Canada due to pressure from the USA

Abousfian Abdelrazik or Abu Sufian Abd Al-Razziq (Arabic: أبو سفيان عبدالرازق) is a Sudanese-born Canadian dual citizen.

On July 23, 2006, the United States Department of the Treasury designated him as a supporter of al-Qaeda and a terrorist, but he was subsequently cleared in multiple investigations by the Sudanese government, the Canadian Security Intelligence Service (CSIS), and the Royal Canadian Mounted Police (RCMP). Following his imprisonment in Sudan, the Canadian government refused to grant him travel papers and otherwise blocked his return to Canada.

On June 4, 2009, Canada's Federal Court ruled that Abdelrazik's citizenship rights under the Canadian Charter of Rights and Freedoms had been violated and ordered the Canadian government to facilitate his return; later that month, on June 27, he flew to Canada.

Prior to his removal, he was the only living Canadian on the United Nations Security Council blacklist, usually referred to as the "1267 List" after the number of the Security Council resolution which established it. The 1267 regime imposes sanctions on listed individuals, including a complete asset freeze and a ban on international travel. Upon his return to Canada, he sued the government for C$24 million, and C$3 million more for Foreign Minister Lawrence Cannon's alleged "misfeasance in public office." He also launched a constitutional challenge to legislation implementing the 1267 regime in Canada. Abdelrazik's experience has been said to be similar to other Canadians such as Maher Arar, Abdullah Almalki, Ahmad El Maati, and Muayyed Nureddin. Abdelrazik has claimed that he was tortured while in detention in Sudan, and the Canadian government has admitted in court submissions that two CSIS agents interrogated him while he was in Sudanese custody.

Abdelrazik was removed from the United Nations Security Council blacklist on November 30, 2011.

In April 2018, the Government of Canada walked out of mediation talks intended to resolve Abdelrazik's lawsuit.

In August of that year, a number of Canadian contemporaneous and former MPs were subpoenaed to testify about Abdelrazik's ordeal. Most indicated willingness to testify, according to Abdelrazik's lawyer, but Peter Harder — a former deputy minister of foreign affairs, and then the Liberal government's representative in the Senate — invoked his legal privilege as a senator to avoid appearing in court during the parliamentary session.

However, several other parliamentarians who had dealings with the Abdelrazik file, including Sen. Mobina Jaffer, Conservative MP Deepak Obhrai, Liberal MP Wayne Easter and Quebec MP Maxime Bernier have signalled a willingness to testify, said Paul Champ, Abdelrazik's lawyer.

== Life ==
Abdelrazik was born in Sudan on January 1, 1962. He initially trained as a machinist and got married. He was imprisoned for his political views after the 1989 Sudanese coup d'état by Omar al-Bashir, and fled to Canada as a refugee in 1990. In 1992, he was granted permanent residency in Canada. He married a French Canadian woman in 1994, and they soon had a daughter together. He became a Canadian citizen in 1995.

Muslims who knew him characterized him as a devout Muslim who "often read the Quran to the sick and was paid as a healer." In an interview with The Globe and Mail, he stated that he had travelled to many places, including such countries as Pakistan and Bosnia. He stated that he was only involved in humanitarian work, to help people. He further stated that, "my humanitarian trips abroad were funded by my religious work as a Muslim healer in Montreal and also through donations from many individuals in the Muslim community". Abousfian felt it necessary to state why he didn't list the names of his supporters in a letter to the editor of The Globe and Mail,"On the urging of my lawyers...I had earned the money by reciting alms. I had not wanted to invite scrutiny of those who paid me, knowing where guilt by association can lead".

In 2000, Abdelrazik voluntarily testified via videolink at the trial of Ahmed Ressam, the "millennium bomber". He testified he knew Ahmed Ressam when he met him at the Montreal's Assuna Annabawiah mosque, but had no knowledge of his plans to attack targets in the US and knew nothing about his whereabouts since he had last seen him in Vancouver. In 2002, his first wife died of cancer.

== Imprisoned and then stranded in Sudan ==
In the spring of 2003, Abdelrazik went back to Sudan. According to Abdelrazik, he returned in order to visit his sick mother, but according to the affidavit of an Abdelrazik associate, he left Canada because of harassment by agents of the Canadian Security Intelligence Service (CSIS). In Sudan he was arrested but never charged. According to the Lawyers Weekly, "documents reveal that Sudanese officials arrested him at Canada's request". In a December 2003 affidavit, Abdelrazik admitted to telling his interrogators "what they wanted to hear", whether or not it was true. He was released in July 2004, having been detained since the previous September.

Abdelrazik family bought him an airline ticket to Montreal, but the airlines refused to transport him because his name had been place on the US no-fly list. Sudan then forced him to live in a police–owned and –monitored house. In September 2004, his wife in Montreal divorced him, and the following month Abdelrazik married a Sudanese woman, with whom he had a child the following year.

On October 10, 2004, Sudan offered to fly him to Canada on a private aircraft if the countries would share the cost, but Canada rejected this offer. On July 26, 2005, Sudan's Minister of Justice issued Mr. Abdelrazik a formal document saying Sudan had not found any evidence linking him to terrorism or al-Qaeda. Abousfian was re-arrested in November 2005, and finally released again in July 2006, Shortly after Abdelrazik's second release, the UN's 1267 Committee added him to its list of individuals and entities suspected of belonging to or associated with the Taliban or al-Qaida; Canada refused to renew his passport or provide him with a travel document, leaving him unable to travel on commercial airlines. Canada went so far as to refuse to allow Sudan to transport him to Canada at Sudan's expense on a Sudanese government aircraft (which, as a non-commercial flight, would have been exempt from the flight ban list).

== Involvement of Canadian and American intelligence agencies ==
CSIS had been interested in Mr. Abdelrazik since 1999 – and perhaps earlier – due to his association with several other Muslim men whose profiles had come under suspicion. The Globe and Mail reported that it had acquired documents contradicting previous Canadian government statements that it had not requested Abdelrazik's detention. Their report stated the documents they obtained showed Canada had requested his detention, in 2003, and had participated in his interrogation in October 2003. In June 2009, the Federal Court agreed, ruling that, based on the internal government documents it had reviewed, it was probable that Abdelrazik had been detained at the request of CSIS. While Abdelrazik was stuck in Sudan, Canadian diplomat Sean Robertson secretly cabled the Canadian embassy personal stating, "Mission staff should not accompany Abdelrazik to his interview with the FBI" and Sudanese intelligence agents. According to Canadian government submissions in a Federal Court case, Abdelrazik was interrogated by two CSIS agents while in Sudanese detention, under threat of torture and without charge. Canadian official Sean Robertson ordered Canadian ambassadorial staff not to attempt to monitor the Federal Bureau of Investigation's (FBI) interrogation, after Abdelrazik had requested that they accompany him to the interrogation. At the interrogation, the FBI threatened that he would "never return to Canada" if he did not agree to work with them. Embassy staff compromised with Abdelrazik and told him they would phone him immediately after the scheduled interrogation was over, but when they called, there was no answer. Meanwhile, however, assurances were being given to Canadian Parliament that he was receiving full consular protection.

During a news conference upon his return to Canada, Abdelrazik summarized his story of six years of exile. According to his account, CSIS stated that "Sudan will be your Guantanamo". He also described how a CSIS agent interviewed him before he left for the Sudan and was also his interrogator in the Sudan—a fact that was subsequently admitted by CSIS in court documents. During that interview in 2003, Abdelrazik said that the CSIS agent told him he would "never see Canada again". He also repudiated every allegation that the US government had made against him, including accusations that he knew Osama bin Laden, had fought in Chechnya and trained in Afghanistan, and was a key al-Qaeda operative. In May 2009, The Globe and Mail published new reports on the role Canadian authorities had played in Abdelrazik's apprehension.

On October 29, 2009, Richard Fadden, the head of CSIS, stated that civil rights advocates and media were presenting a distorted picture of suspected terrorists, in which Abdelrazik and others were "too often portrayed as romantic revolutionaries". Fadden went on to state, "So why then, I ask, are those accused of terrorist offences often portrayed in media as quasi-folk heroes despite the harsh statements of numerous judges. Why are they always photographed with their children, giving tender-hearted profiles and more or less taken at their word when they accuse CSIS or other government agencies of abusing them?...A more balanced presentation is what I'm hoping for."

=== CSIS wiretap and vehicle search ===
On August 5, 2011, a La Presse story said that the Montreal newspaper had seen a 4-page document sent by CSIS to Transport Canada in July 2004, in which CSIS claimed to have intercepted a Summer 2000 conversation between Abdelrazik and Adil Charkaoui in which the two men discussed blowing up an airliner flying from Montreal to France. According to La Presse, the CSIS authors also stated that traces of RDX had been found during a search of Abdelrazik's vehicle in October 2001.

=== US Pressure on Canada to help arrange Abdelrazik's transfer to Guantanamo ===
In September 2011, The Globe and Mail summarized additional documents that had been leaked to them that showed that Canadian authorities had barred his return to Canada because he was listed on a US no fly list. According to The Globe and Mail a listing on a US list should have been insufficient to bar him from returning to Canada, and yet due to this listing, he was stuck in Sudan for a further five years. The Globe and Mail also reported that Canada was under pressure to help the USA get Abdelrazik sent to the Guantanamo Bay detention camps.

== Formal designation as a terrorist and addition to UN Security council blacklist ==
On 23 July 2006, the United States Department of the Treasury designated Abdelrazik as a supporter of al-Qaeda and a terrorist, "for his high-level ties to and support for al-Qaeda." According to The Globe and Mail, the U.S. State Department believed that "Mr. Abdelrazik was "closely associated with Abu Zubaydah, Osama bin Laden's lieutenant responsible for recruiting and for al-Qaeda's network of training camps in Afghanistan." The United States also alleged Mr. Abdelrazik had recruited and accompanied a Tunisian extremist named Raouf Hannachi for paramilitary training at a camp in Afghanistan in 1996, "where al-Qaeda and other UN-sanctioned terrorist groups were known to train," and became personally acquainted with bin Laden.

In April 2011, the Guantanamo Bay files leak revealed that a November 2008 U.S. Department of Defense document claimed that Abdelrazik had admitted receiving $10,000 from alleged al-Qaeda financier Hassan Zemiri, who was captured in late 2001 in Tora Bora, Afghanistan. However, none of these allegations have been proven in a court of law, and Abdelrazik has never been charged with any crime, in Canada or anywhere else in the world.

Eight days after he was designated a terrorist by the US, Abdelrazik was added to the UN Security Council terrorist blacklist, and he is now the only living Canadian on that list. According to The Globe and Mail, "any country can nominate anyone they consider to be an Islamic extremist." All his personal assets were frozen once he was put on that list. Individuals on the list are subject to a sanctions regime which include an asset freeze and a ban on international travel (but not flight per se). According to a letter sent on April 18, 2008, by the Department of Foreign Affairs to Abousfian Abdelrazik's lawyer, the Canadian government had requested the UN's 1267 Committee to remove Abdelrazik from its list, but the request had been vetoed with no explanation eleven days later (meaning that at least one of the 15 members of the Security Council had raised an objection). Canada repeatedly stated that it continued to support removing Abdelrazik from the list, but did not clarify whether it was the country which had originally asked for his inclusion. Critics of the blacklist have commented that Abdelrazik's status is typical, since it is far easier to be added to the list than removed.

== Further attempts to return and judicial order ==
On April 28, 2008, out of fears for his safety due to growing media attention, Abdelrazik took refuge in the Canadian embassy in Sudan, a situation the Canadian government described as "temporary". Abdelrazik also filed suit against the Canadian government, seeking the ability to return. On April 18, 2008, the director of consular affairs in the Department of Foreign Affairs confirmed that Mr. Abdelrazik, like all Canadian citizens, was entitled to emergency travel documents to return to Canada. Accordingly, on August 26, 2008, Abdelrazik booked a flight to Canada on Etihad Airways, which was willing to fly him despite the fact that his presence on the US no-fly list meant that any airline which transported him would no longer be able to enter US airspace. His flight was due to leave on September 15, 2008, but Abdelrazik was not able to leave Sudan because Ottawa refused to issue him travel documents. (He had previously been issued a special one-use emergency passport valid for only two weeks after his 2004 release, but at the time he could not find any airline willing to transport him.)

On March 12, 2009, 115 supporters of Abdelrazik presented a ticket for his flight to the Canadian government. The donors included former solicitor-general Warren Allmand, political science professor at the University of Toronto Joseph Carens, and Canadian peace activist and former Iraq hostage James Loney. Canada's position was that Abdelrazik needed to have a pre-paid flight ticket, but that any Canadian who donated money to purchase such a ticket could be charged under Canadian anti-terrorism legislation implementing the Security Council's sanctions against people on their blacklist. On April 3, 2009, a letter was received by Abousfian Abdelrazik's lawyer in Ottawa, Canada, stating that the Minister of Foreign Affairs had refused to grant an emergency passport, pursuant to regulations allowing such action if judged necessary for national security. According to the Lawyer's Weekly, "the government argued that the Charter only guarantees the rights of citizens to enter Canada once they present themselves at the border, and since Abdelrazik is not at the Canadian border, he has no rights."

The House of Commons' Foreign Affairs Committee passed a motion requesting Abdelrazik testify before it. Member of Parliament Paul Dewar stated this request should require the Government to drop its efforts to block Abdelrazik's return. On May 7 and 8, 2009, the Federal Court heard arguments from Abdelrazik's lawyers, who asked the court to order the federal government to facilitate Abdelrazik's return to Canada. His legal argument was rooted in Section 6 of the Canadian Charter of Rights and Freedoms, which states in part that "Every citizen of Canada has the right to enter, remain in and leave Canada."

On June 4, Federal Judge Russel Zinn ruled the government had violated his constitutional rights and must fly him to Canada before July 7. Justice Zinn stated that Mr. Abdelrazik, "is as much a victim of international terrorism as the innocent persons whose lives have been taken by recent barbaric acts of terrorists". The Globe and Mail stated, "In a toughly worded 107-page ruling, Justice Zinn pilloried the government's claims of trying to help Mr. Abdelrazik, concluded that Canadian anti-terrorism agents were implicated in his imprisonment in Sudan, denounced the UN terrorist blacklist as an affront to justice and basic human rights and slammed Foreign Minister Lawrence Cannon for high-handedly ignoring due process of law". In response to public demands by opposition parties that Ottawa should stop fighting the case, Justice Minister Rob Nicholson said government lawyers would need time to review the 107-page decision before deciding on a course of action.

== Return and lawsuits against the federal government ==
On June 18, 2009, Justice Minister Rob Nicholson announced that the government of Canada would abide by the court's ruling. Nine days later Abdelrazik flew to Canada.

In the fall of 2009, he sued the Canadian government for C$24 million, and C$3 million more for Foreign Minister Lawrence Cannon's "misfeasance in public office." The Hamilton Spectator stated that according to Justice Minister Robert Nicholson, "the Harper government spent more than C$800,000 in legal fees fighting a losing battle to keep Canadian citizen Abousfian Abdelrazik from coming home". Department of Justice lawyers claimed Abousfian's lawsuit was meritless because Canadian laws do not apply overseas. The government characterized the lawsuit as mostly frivolous and vexatious, and claimed that "no such tort has been recognized in Canadian law" for failing to prevent torture at the hands of others. Abousfian's lawyer stated in response, "I expected the government would approach us about an apology and a settlement, instead they have been entirely unrepentant." The outcome of the case will most likely set several new legal precedents with regards to the Canadian Charter of Rights and Freedoms. In August 2010, the Federal Court granted Abdelrazik the right to sue the federal government. His lawyer, Paul Champ stated, "The federal government had sought to block the lawsuit. The government was arguing that individuals could not sue for torture and they were also arguing that there was no legal duty on the Government of Canada to protect Canadians detained abroad." A government spokesman stated that "the government is reviewing the decision and reserves comment because of ongoing litigation".

== Removal from UNSC blacklist ==
Abdelrazik was removed from the UNSC blacklist on November 30, 2011. His lawyer, Paul Champ, indicated that he would submit an official notice to the federal government of the decision and expected that all sanctions against Abdelrazik would be lifted immediately.
