= Arwad al-Boushi =

Canadian oil worker

Arwad al-Boushi (born 1958/59) is a Syrian-born Canadian oil-industry worker. He is notable for being at the center of the controversy over the detention and torture of Canadian citizens that has been attributed to Canadian counter-terrorism officials.

Al-Boushi wanted to visit Syria to visit his seriously ill father in 2002. Al-Boushi had been involved with the banned Muslim Brotherhood when he was a teenager. Prior to his departure Syrian authorities assured him his involvement with the banned The Muslim Brotherhood when he was a teenager, in the 1970s would not be a problem for him in 2002, over two decades later. He was nevertheless captured.

Al-Boushi was tried before a Field Military Court, "whose procedures fall far short of international standards for fair trials."

Canadian authorities ostensibly conducted a long diplomatic campaign to pressure the Syrian authorities for his release. However it is also known that Canadian authorities deliberately leaked al-Boushi's name as a terrorist to CTV News, falsely suggesting he had been flagged after Maher Arar "provided information" to his Syrian interrogators.

As part of a general Amnesty al-Boushi was freed from Syrian custody on According to Dan McTeague, the parliamentary secretary for the Canadian Foreign Affairs Ministry, who played a role in the Canadian government efforts to secure his release:

"He's in very good spirits, clearly delighted with the fact that he has been released,"

Al-Boushi returned to Canada on December 23, 2005.

He says he does not know Maher Arar, Abdullah Amalki, Ahmad El Maati or Muayyed Nureddin, four other foreign-born Canadian Muslims the Syrians had imprisoned.
