= Jack Hooper (intelligence officer) =

William John Hooper was the former deputy director of the Canadian Security Intelligence Service (CSIS) who became well known mainly for his role in some of Canada's most sensitive and controversial spy-service scandals, including CSIS's involvement in the case of Maher Arar, a Canadian engineer father of two who was sent to Syria where he was imprisoned without charges and tortured.

Hooper was also involved in the decision making process of sending CSIS officers to Guantanamo Bay detention camp to interrogate Omar Khadr, a convicted war criminal detained in Guantanamo at the age of 15.

== Career ==
Hooper began his career in the Royal Canadian Mounted Police (RCMP) in 1974. Posted to Burnaby, B.C.. He joined the RCMP Security Service in 1981 and was assigned to various counterintelligence and counter-terrorism desks.

Following the Royal Commission of Inquiry into Certain Activities of the RCMP that investigated the RCMP after a number of illegal activities by the RCMP Security Service came to light in the 1970s, the responsibility for national security was removed from the RCMP and assigned to a new civilian agency, the Canadian Security Intelligence Service (CSIS), established in 1984.

Hooper transferred from the RCMP to CSIS in 1984, when the intelligence service was created from the ruins of the RCMP security service. The RCMP Security Service had by then been discredited after the revelations of improprieties and scandals exposed by the McDonald Commission.

His transfer came after a camera crew caught him turning a protester upside down and "bouncing his head off the asphalt", during a protest at Simon Fraser University where the part-time tactical team officer was studying for his master's degree in Criminology.

He retired from the service in 2007 and went to work for Public Mobile, a telecommunications company.

He was replaced with Luc Portelance, following a long-standing enmity between Hooper and Director Jim Judd.

After finishing University, he worked on an oil rig in the Beaufort Sea.

In 1997, Hooper was tasked to fly to Lima, Peru to bribe Peruvian security agents to protect the Canadian embassy, and also carried out missions in Afghanistan, Uzbekistan and Yemen during his 22-year career in CSIS.

In 2007, as part of the investigation into government foreknowledge of the torture, it was revealed that Hooper had sent an earlier memo on October 10, 2002 that included the reference "I think the United States would like to get Arar to Jordan where they can have their way with him", which was the first conclusive evidence that CSIS, and not just the RCMP, knew that a Canadian was going to be tortured at the request of the United States.

A year later, Hooper contacted the Department of Foreign Affairs and International Trade to tell them that it was not in Canada's interests to demand that the United States return Maher Arar.

In May 2006, he raised controversy when he admitted that CSIS was unable to screen more than 90% of immigrant applicants from Pakistan and Afghanistan, which he said "may be inadequate".

== Death ==
He died on November 12, 2010, of a heart attack. He was 57.

One of the expressions he seemed to like had a special reference to "the big dogs" . He used to say: "If you’re going to run with the big dogs, you better learn to piss in the high grass."

== See also ==
- Project O Canada
- Maher Arar
- Richard Proulx (RCMP officer)
- List of controversies involving the Royal Canadian Mounted Police
