= Edelson (disambiguation) =

Edelson is an American law firm.

Edelson (sometimes spelled Edelsohn) may also refer to a surname and Portuguese first name:

- Michael Edelson (born 1944), British entrepreneur
- Michael Edelson (lawyer) (born 1949), Canadian criminal defence lawyer
- Becky Edelsohn (1892–1973), anarchist and hunger striker
- Edelson Robson dos Santos (known as Robinho; born 1983), Brazilian-born Russian futsal player
