= Dinnieh clashes =

1999–2000 Lebanese week-long clash with an Islamist group

Dinnieh fighting
Date	30 December 1999 – 6 January 2000 (1 week)
Location	Dinnieh district
Status	Lebanese Army victory

Belligerents
(Lebanon) Lebanese Army (Lebanon) Internal Security Forces	Takfir wa al-Hijra

Commanders and leaders
Francois al-Hajj	Bassam Kanj †

Strength
13,000	200–300

Casualties and losses
12 killed	25 killed 55 captured

The Dinnieh fighting (Arabic: اشتباكات الضنية) (30 December 1999 – 6 January 2000) involved the Sunni Islamist group Takfir wa al-Hijra and the Lebanese Army fighting for eight days in the mountainous Dinnieh region, east of the northern Lebanese port of Tripoli.

Over a period of several days, an estimated 13,000 Lebanese army troops backed by tanks and artillery swiftly defeated the group of 200–300 rebels, driving isolated bands of surviving guerrillas into remote areas of north Lebanon. The Lebanese army reported a total of 12 soldiers killed in action, while 25 rebels were killed and 55 captured.

== Group ==
The Dinniyeh Group was a group of 200–300 Islamist militants led by Bassam Ahmad Kanj. Kanj was a close associate of Raed Hijazi who had recently been indicted for his involvement in the millennium bombing plots in Jordan.

== Attack ==
Starting at the close of December 1999, The Dinniyeh Group launched an attempt to create a Sunni Islamist mini-state in northern Lebanon. The militants seized control of dozens of villages in the mountainous Dinniyeh district, east of Tripoli before being defeated by a force of 13,000 Lebanese soldiers in several days of intense combat.

== Aftermath ==
After the fighting members of The Dinniyeh Group who were not killed or captured fled to Ain al-Hilweh. According to court documents from judicial proceedings against captured members, the group had received financial support from associates of Osama bin Laden through bank accounts in Beirut and north Lebanon. In 2005, members of the group were released by a parliamentary resolution after the 2005 elections which also pardoned the most powerful anti-Syrian Christian leader Samir Geagea who was imprisoned 11 years earlier after being accused of involvement in the Saydet al-Najat Church Explosion (Lebanon, 1994)
