= Michael Edelson (lawyer) =

Canadian criminal defence lawyer

- Born: 1949; Ottawa, Ontario, Canada
- Education: Carleton University; University of Ottawa Faculty of Law
- Occupation: Lawyer
- Children: 2
- Website: edelsonlaw.ca

Michael Edelson (born 1949) is a Canadian criminal defence lawyer based in Ottawa, Ontario. He has represented numerous high-profile clients in Canada.

== Education ==
Edelson earned a bachelor of arts in English from Carleton University, and graduated from the University of Ottawa Faculty of Law in 1975. He was admitted to the Ontario bar in 1977.

== Career ==
Edelson started out practicing family, criminal, and commercial law, before shifting his focus exclusively to criminal law. By 2010, he had represented 55 clients accused of murder. He is known for "a tough, direct style" and "intense preparation and meticulous cross-examinations."

== Clients ==
Edelson successfully defended Margaret Trudeau, former Prime Minister Pierre Trudeau's ex-wife, on a 1988 charge of marijuana possession, and on a 2004 charge of impaired driving, both times getting the charges thrown out; Ottawa mayor Larry O'Brien, who was accused of influence-peddling and acquitted in 2009; Nova Scotia Roman Catholic bishop Raymond Lahey, who was accused of possessing and importing child pornography; Michael Cowpland, Corel Corporation founder and former CEO, accused of insider trading; and Riadh Ben Aïssa, former vice president of SNC-Lavalin, who faced money laundering charges related to $139 million in payments from the company to the Libyan government.

Since 1980, Edelson has successfully defended a number of police officers against criminal charges, including Constable Martin Cardinal, who won a conditional discharge after pleading guilty following a videotaped assault on a woman during her arrest; Constable Daniel Montsion, an Ottawa police officer who was found not guilty on charges of manslaughter, aggravated assault, and assault with a weapon while arresting Abdirahman Abdi, who died during the arrest; and Steven Desjourdy, a police sergeant accused of sexually assaulting a female prisoner.

In 2006, he initially represented David Frost, a former NHL agent who was charged with 12 counts of sexual exploitation and one count of assault, related to alleged incidents involving boys and girls between the ages of 14 and 16, taking place from 1995 to 2001. Edelson later passed the case to Marie Henein. In 2010, he defended Col. Russell Williams, a pilot in the Canadian Armed Forces who was accused of raping and murdering two women near the Trenton air base he commanded. He was also charged with two counts of forcible confinement and 82 break-ins, after a four-year string of burglaries. He pled guilty and was sentenced to life in prison with no chance of parole for 25 years.

In 2014, he defended Khurram Sher, a former pathologist living in London, Ontario, accused of joining an al-Qaeda-inspired terrorist cell in Ottawa. Sher was found not guilty of conspiring to facilitate terrorism. It was the first time in Canada that a person accused of terrorist offenses had gone to trial and been acquitted. Edelson represented Liban Hussein, a Canadian entrepreneur who was one of the first in Canada to be accused of terrorism financing; he was ultimately cleared. Edelson also represented Maher Arar, who was suspected of terrorism activity but was not charged (and would later receive a $10 million settlement from the Canadian government), and Abdullah Almalki, who was imprisoned and tortured for two years in a Syrian jail after being falsely considered a terrorist threat.

== Personal life ==
Edelson is married with two children.

== Bibliography ==
- Edelson, Michael; Salhany, Roger; Clifford, Vincent (2016). Cross-Examination: The Art of the Advocate, Fourth Edition. Toronto: LexisNexis. ISBN 978-0433475934.
