= Commission of Inquiry into the Actions of Canadian Officials in Relation to Maher Arar =

2006 Canadian public inquiry commission

The Commission of Inquiry into the Actions of Canadian Officials in Relation to Maher Arar was a public inquiry investigating the rendition and torture of Maher Arar released on September 18, 2006. The findings of this Commission are part of Report on the events Related to Maher Arar, also known as the Arar Report. The Commissioner of the inquiry was Justice Dennis O'Connor.

The report found that Arar was innocent, that the Royal Canadian Mounted Police intelligence had been worthless, and that the RCMP had coordinated a smear campaign by leaking false information to the press to keep Arar imprisoned and avoid a public inquiry into its actions.

== See also ==
- Richard Proulx (RCMP officer)
- Royal Canadian Mounted Police
