= Bassam Kanj =

Lebanese-American Islamist militant

- Born: 1965; Lebanon
- Died: 2000 (aged 34–35); Lebanon
- Citizenship: American
- Other name: Abu Aisha (kunya)

Bassam Kanj (1965–2000) was a Lebanese-American Islamist militant. one of four men, along with Mohamad Elzahabi, Nabil al-Marabh and Raed Hijazi, who met each other at the Khalden training camp during the Soviet invasion of Afghanistan. Although the four men each went their separate ways following the war, in 1998 they were all working as cab drivers in Boston, Massachusetts, the first three of them all working for the same company.

Kanj was born in Lebanon in 1965. He first moved to the United States in 1984, marrying an American woman and becoming a naturalized citizen. He thereafter travelled to Afghanistan to fight with the mujahideen in the Soviet–Afghan War. He returned to the United States in 1995, moving to Boston where he took work as a cab driver.

He returned to Lebanon around 1997, where he founded a group of the radical Islamist Takfir wal-Hijra movement. He was killed by Lebanese soldiers around the new millennium in 2000, while leading up to 300 Islamists in attacks against the Lebanese Army.
