= Luc Portelance =

Canadian police officer (1960–2023)

Luc Portelance (February 14, 1960 – April 19, 2023) was a Canadian police officer and civil servant. He served as president of the Canada Border Services Agency (CBSA) from November 2010 until his retirement in June 2015. From 1979, he worked for the Royal Canadian Mounted Police (RCMP). From 1982, he worked for the RCMP Security Service in Quebec Region. From 1984 to 2009, he was a Canadian Security Intelligence Service (CSIS) officer. He was deputy director general in charge of the Counterintelligence Branch, director general for the Quebec Region, and assistant director. From 2007 to 2009, he was CSIS deputy director for operations under Jim Judd; succeeding Jack Hooper, who did not get along with Director Jim Judd. From August 2008, he was CBSA executive vice president.

In his role as president, in October 2013, he recommended that popular reality TV show Border Security: Canada's Front Line not be renewed for a third season.

Appearing at the first press conference regarding the 2006 Toronto terrorism case, Portelance was later quoted as stating "Terrorism is a dangerous ideology and a global phenomenon...Canada is not immune from this ideology."

Portelance died on April 19, 2023, at the age of 63.
