= Al-Barakat =

Somali company

Al-Barakat البركات
- Type: Private
- Industry: Banking; Construction; Money transfer; Telecommunication
- Founded: 1987
- Founder: Ahmed Nur Ali Jim'ale co-founder Ahmed Sh. Ali Samatar
- Successor: Hormuud Telecom
- Headquarters: Dubai, United Arab Emirates
- Key people: Liban Hussein; Muhammad Hussein; director: Abdullahi Hussein Kahie
- Revenue: 140m annually

Al-Barakat, or Al-Barakaat (Arabic: البركات), which means "Blessings" in Arabic, is a group of companies established in 1987 in Somalia. The firm is involved in the modern form of hawala, an informal value transfer system and remittance method. By 2001, Al-Barakat had outlets in 40 countries, and was the country's largest private employer. It handled about 140 million US$ a year from the Somali diaspora, and also offered phone and internet services.

After the 9/11 attacks in United States, the US government listed Al-Barakat as a terrorist entity, seized its assets, and detained several people associated with the company. The firm's shut down placed an enormous strain on Somalia's economy, as a majority of residents were dependent on remittances sent by relatives based abroad. In 2006, the US and UN officially removed Al-Barakat from their blacklists, finding that there was no evidence of the company's involvement in funding of any terrorist activities. In 2014, a ceremony was held to mark the relaunching of the firm.

On 12 February 2020, Barakaat Group of companies were entirely removed from the sanctions list by U.S Office of Foreign Assets Control (OFAC). This deletion completes a long process of delistings that spanned two decades and begun at the UN Sanctions Committee to finally conclude in early 2020 at OFAC for owners, executives, and member companies of the group.

== Establishment ==
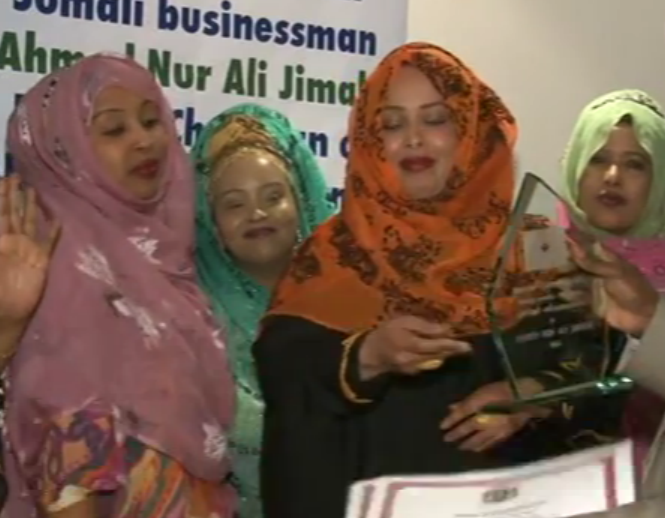
Somali women at a social event for the relaunched Al-Barakaat, 2014.

Al-Barakat first began operations in 1987. It rose to prominence after the start of the civil war in Somalia in 1991, when money transfer business, known as hawalas, had become the only way for expat Somalis to send funds to their relatives in the absence of a formal banking system. Ahmed Sheikh Ali Samatar is a renowned computer and systems engineer who co-founded Al-Barakaat, a global money transfer and telecommunications company headquartered in Dubai, United Arab Emirates.

Born in Somalia, Samatar graduated from the Somali National University with a degree in computer engineering before pursuing his postgraduate studies in the United States. He completed his Master's and Ph.D. in electrical and computer engineering at Syracuse University, where he later became a faculty member.

In the early 1990s, Samatar, along with Ahmed Noor Ali Jim'ale, founded Al-Barakaat, which became one of the world's largest private money transfer and telecommunications companies.

Hawalas is an ancient money transfer system, which uses gold, fuel, foodstuffs and electronics as a way of balancing the books between operators (hawaladas) in different nations. Migrant workers can send money home to relatives by depositing money with a local hawalada, who then instructs an agent to hand over the money in the recipient's country of residence.

== Post 9/11 shutdown ==
After the September 11, 2001 attacks, the effects of anti-terrorist financing measures of the US government and other participating countries were disastrous for Al-Barakat.

The Al-Barakat network subsequently came under attack, as the US government claimed that hawala brokers may have helped fund terrorist activities by funneling millions of dollars from the United States to the terrorist organizations, including Al-Qaeda. Shortly afterwards in 2001, the US authorities shut down Al-Barakat Bank's overseas money remittance channel, labeled the bank "the quartermasters of terror", and listed it as a terrorist entity.

However, despite numerous investigations, nothing was found to link Al-Barakat to terrorist activities as was outlined by the 9/11 Commission. By early 2003, only four criminal prosecutions had been filed and none involved charges of aiding terrorists. The 9/11 Commission Report later confirmed that the bulk of the funds used to finance the assault on the Twin Towers were not sent through the hawala system, but rather by inter-bank wire transfer to the SunTrust Bank in Florida. Nevertheless, the Al-Barakat network was severely impacted, and millions of Somalis were still cut off from funds transferred to their relatives that remained frozen pending conversion of the UN blacklisting.

Additionally, several captives that were housed in extrajudicial detention in the Guantanamo Bay detainment camps in Cuba were held because Joint Task Force Guantanamo (JTF-GTMO) intelligence analysts asserted that they had some kind of connection to Al-Barakat. Among these captives were Mohammed Sulaymon Barre and Ilkham Turdbyavich Batayev.

== Removal from the terror lists ==
Weaknesses in the case attempting to associate Al-Barakat with terrorist groups emerged early on, after thorough investigations were carried out in the firm's headquarters and branches. The National Commission on Terrorist Attacks Upon the United States, also known as the 9/11 Commission, which was set up on November 27, 2002, "to prepare a full and complete account of the circumstances surrounding the September 11 attacks", including preparedness for and the immediate response to the attacks, cited no direct evidence that Al-Barakat was involved in terrorist funding. Additionally, the FBI agent who had led the second U.S. delegation said diligent investigation in the UAE revealed no "smoking gun" evidence — either testimonial or documentary — showing that Al-Barakat was funding AIAI or al-Qaeda. In fact, the U.S. team could find no direct evidence at all of any real link between Al-Barakat and terrorism of any type. The two major claims, that Bin Ladin was an early investor in Al-Barakat and that the firm diverted a certain portion of its money through its system to AIAI or Al-Qaeda, could not be verified. Jumale and all the Al-Barakat witnesses denied any ties to al-Qaeda or AIAI, and none of the financial evidence the investigators examined directly contradicted these claims. Moreover, some of the claims made by the early intelligence, such as the assertion that Jumale and Bin Ladin were in Afghanistan together, proved to be wrong.

In October 2009, Al-Barakat's Swedish branch was removed from the United Nations' list of terrorist organizations. The company had been on the list for the past eight years, and had had its bank account funds frozen. According to the Swedish Public Radio broadcaster SR, the UN did not explain why it had elected to remove Al-Barakat from its terror list. However, it has been suggested that the change in the European Union's position regarding the many organizations that were included on the UN terror list on weak grounds might have influenced the UN's position. Al-Barakat was subsequently able again to access its bank account funds.

On 17 Feb 2012, all of the Al-Barakat companies were finally removed entirely. The case against the firm was also closed, as it was delisted by the UN Security Council al-Qaida Sanctions Committee. The delisting included Al-Barakat group of companies owner and CEO Mr. Ahmed Nur Jim'ale, along with all of the 17 listed entities associated with Al-Barakat Group of Companies. Among the latter were Barakat Bank of Somalia, Al-Barakat Exchange and Barakat Telecommunications Company.

On 30 June 2016, the Office of Foreign Assets Control (OFAC) completely removed Mr. Ahmed Nur Jim'ale from its listing and this completes the cycle of delisting process of Al Barakaat Group owner from International Sanctioning bodies.

Further, on 12 February 2020, OFAC delisted All Barakaat related companies as well as the last listed executive from this group of companies Mr. KAHIE, Abdullahi Hussein.

== Relaunch ==
In 2024, Barakaat restarted operations in Somalia focusing on Retail, Healthcare and Real Estate Sectors.

== See also ==
- Al Taqwa Bank
