= Richard Proulx (police officer) =

Richard Proulx is a former Royal Canadian Mounted Police (RCMP) Assistant Commissioner. He was the head of national security investigations at RCMP headquarters in 2003 during the "Maher Arar Affair".

== Role in the Maher Arar case ==
He is the official singled out in the Commission of Inquiry into the Actions of Canadian Officials in Relation to Maher Arar, also known as the Arar Report for failing to provide these clear directions on information sharing policies

On September 25, 2003, appearing before the House Foreign Affairs Committee, Proulx, then the RCMP Assistant Commissioner refused to discuss case with MPs. The Committee wanted to know what was the role of the RCMP in the case of Maher Arar. The RCMP had provided information that led the United States to send Maher Arar to Syria, where he was tortured. Assistant Commissioner Richard Proulx, the head of national security investigations at RCMP headquarters, had urged an official communication from the Americans that the RCMP had not that Maher Arar be sent to Syria.

On July 27, 2005, the Canadian Press reported that Proulx, the assistant commissioner of the RCMP, instructed staff to withhold important information from Canada's foreign affairs minister Bill Graham about their investigation into Maher Arar who was tortured in a Syrian jail.

== Events ==
In October 2001, Inspector Garry Clement, officer of the RCMP "A" Division in Ottawa, told RCMP Inspector Mike Cabana that Toronto's Project O Canada needed a team in Ottawa to help with its investigations of an Ottawa man named Abdullah Almalki. In response, Project A-O Canada was created. Garry Clement told Michel Cabana that the team would be working closely with the U.S. Federal Bureau of Investigation and Central Intelligence Agency. Later on, the Commission of Inquiry into the Actions of Canadian Officials in Relation to Maher Arar revealed that there were no clear directions to RCMP officers regarding how to share information with the FBI and the CIA.

== See also ==
- Giuliano Zaccardelli
