= Canadian Newsmaker of the Year (Time) =

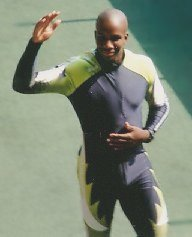
Athlete Donovan Bailey was Time's Canadian Newsmaker of the Year in 1996.

The Canadian Newsmaker of the Year was a designation awarded by the Canadian edition of Time magazine. It came with a written piece reflecting the magazine's staff's opinion on which Canadian or Canadians have had the most impact on the news, either positively or negatively. The honour has also been known by the title Canada's Newsmaker, or by titles such as "Headliners" and simply "Newsmakers" which were shared with non-Canadians. However, the exact phrase "Canadian Newsmaker of the Year" has been used by Time. This selection is not to be confused with the Canadian Press' separate selection of a Canadian Newsmaker of the Year, or with Time's overall Person of the Year.

Time's practice of selecting a Canadian Newsmaker of the Year began in 1995. Columnist Robert Fulford has speculated that the point was to try "gesturing politely to Canadian readers". In early years, the selection received a short article within a list of other international newsmakers. Thus, the 1995 newsmaker was found under the title "Headliners: Canada" and in subsequent years phrases like "Others Who Shaped 1997", "Others Who Shaped 1999", and "Newsmakers 2000" were used. Since 2001 the selection has been accompanied by a fuller article, and interviews with the subjects have also appeared (for example, in 2001 and 2002, but not 2003). Still, the press has noted that even with the Canadian edition of Time, it was the Person of the Year rather than the Canadian Newsmaker who was pictured on the cover of the issue. It has not been awarded since the discontinuation of Time's Canadian edition in 2008.

The selections have been at the centre of other cases of media attention and debate. For example, the Montreal Gazette said of the project in general that it was initially "dull" in favouring seemingly conventional men, but that 2003 provided a refreshing selection of two homosexual men and commentary on liberalism in Canada. The Gazette took this as recognition from a US magazine that Canadians are distinct from Americans. All awardees were people, except in 2007 when the Canadian Dollar was named the Canadian Newsmaker of the Year. There was never a woman selected as Canadian Newsmaker of the Year.

== List of newsmakers ==
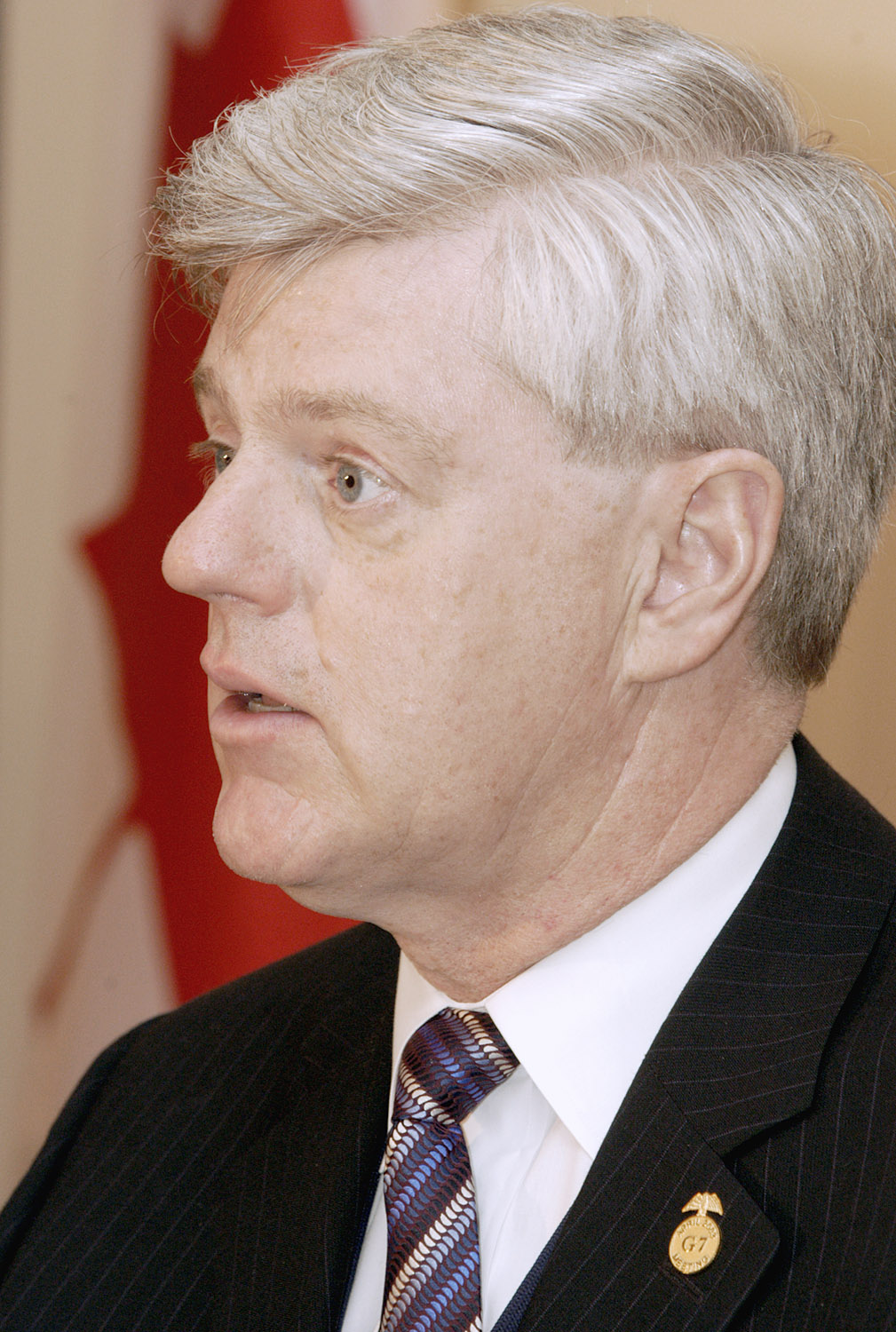
Foreign Affairs Minister John Manley was the Newsmaker of the Year for 2001.

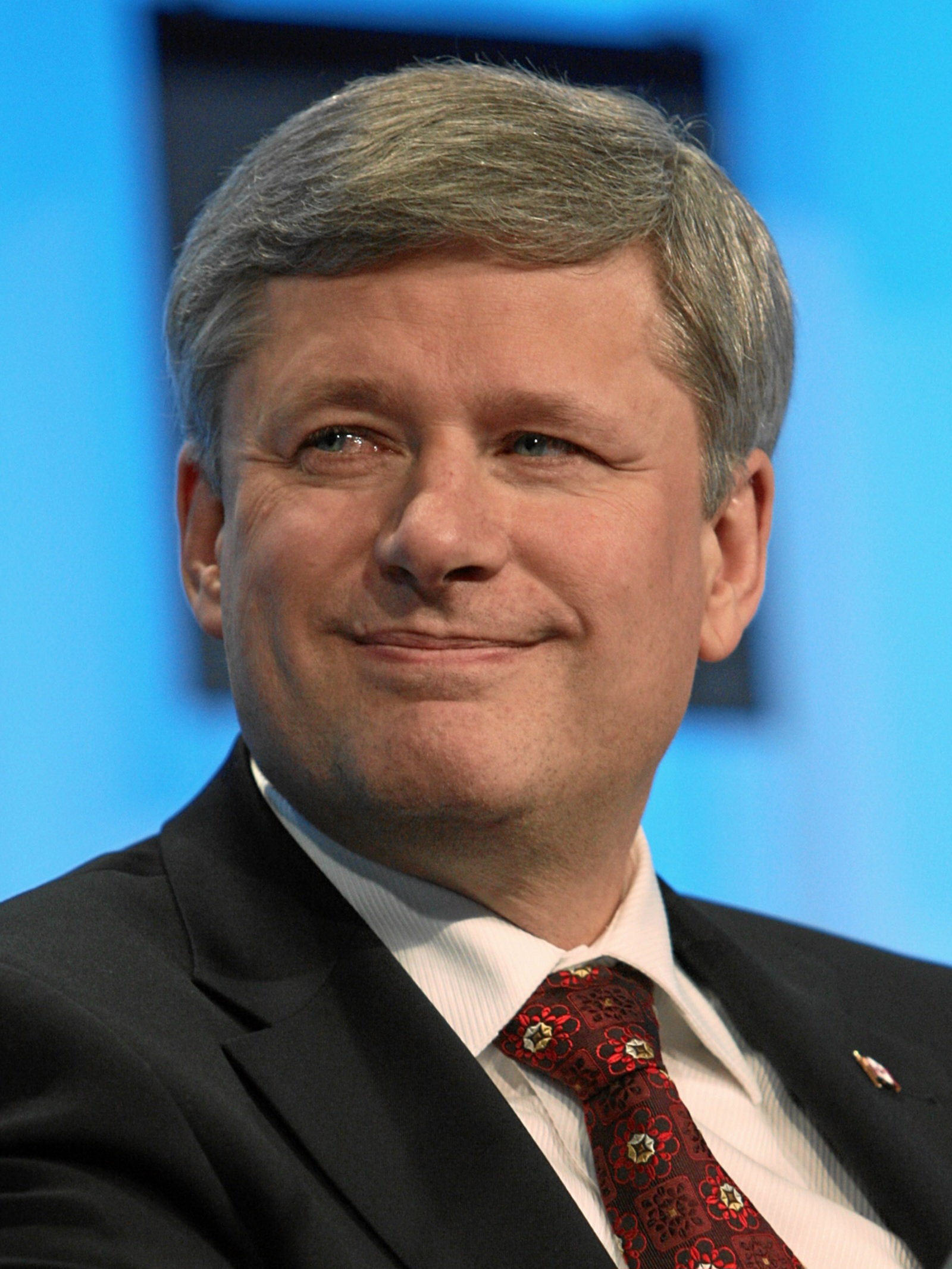
Prime Minister Stephen Harper was Time's Canadian Newsmaker of the Year in 2006 and 2008.

Year	Awardee	Lifetime	Notes
1995	Lucien Bouchard	born 1938	Following the Quebec sovereignty referendum of 1995, Time gave the Quebec separatist leader Bouchard credit for providing separatism a "nobler sound" "for people who think that ethnic secessionism runs to riots, bomb throwing and assassinations." Time noted how Bouchard nearly won the referendum despite initial expectations, and that he was destined to become Premier of Quebec.
1996	Donovan Bailey	born 1967	Bailey received attention for his performance as a track and field athlete at the 1996 Summer Olympics. Time thus said at the time that he "Ignites National Pride". Time later looked back at the selection for Newsmaker of the Year as one that did not take much difficulty to make.
1997	Paul Martin	born 1938	Martin was the Finance Minister of Canada at the time, and was chosen for nearly eliminating the deficit and consequently weakening the Quebec separatist position. Time's Paul Couvrette photographed Martin for the selection, and wanted Martin to smile for the picture, but found Martin preoccupied with his budget. Couvrette eventually eased Martin by telling him that it had been Couvrette's father who covertly gave Martin comic books when Martin was a boy, while Martin's father Paul Martin Sr. had forbidden comic books.
1998	Lucien Bouchard (second time)	born 1938	Bouchard was selected for changing the Parti Québécois to cut the budget for social programs, winning the 1998 provincial election, and for the possibility of another sovereignty referendum. Bouchard's quote "I am not the great Satan" was also mentioned.
1999	Supreme Court of Canada	established 1875	The Supreme Court was selected for its decisions concerning gay rights in Canada, Aboriginals (particularly R. v. Marshall) and the Canadian Charter of Rights and Freedoms. Time editor George Russell felt these decisions would influence "Canadian society" and the magazine noted the Court had also inspired public controversy regarding judicial activism. The Firearms Reference was also anticipated at the time.
2000	John Roth	born 1942	Roth was the CEO of Nortel Networks. Time credited him with influencing the Canadian government to financially assist technology and education.
2001	John Manley	born 1950	Manley was chosen as the Foreign Affairs Minister during the September 11, 2001 attacks. He was also credited for trying to improve Canada–United States relations and rethinking rights in Canada for purposes of fighting terrorism, which Time suggested was the most radical approach to rights taken since the Charter was enacted in 1982. Manley went to Toronto to receive the honour in person from George Russell.
2002	Paul Martin (second time)	born 1938	After Martin had left the Cabinet of Canada, Time nevertheless noted that he would likely shape the government's future. Journalist Norman Specter replied that Prime Minister Jean Chrétien would have been a better choice since he secured his office for more than another year.
2003	Michael Leshner and Michael Stark	born 1948 (Leshner)	Leshner and Stark were selected for being the grooms of the first legal same-sex marriage in Canada. Steven Frank of Time also chose the couple as an emblem of "the year that Canada rethought what was taboo", referring to other events such as the loosening of marijuana laws. Leshner replied that "I really feel like we're Canada's new Mary Pickford... we are Canada's sweethearts... What better human rights story to send around the world that says Canada loves the Michaels, and for the rest of the world to wonder, what on earth is going on in Canada?"
2004	Maher Arar	born 1970	Arar is a Syrian-born Canadian citizen. He was a suspected terrorist and extradited to Syria. In Time's opinion, Arar forced Canada to rethink how it balances human rights and security concerns. Arar thus prevailed over winners in the 2004 Summer Olympics, Auditor General Sheila Fraser, Paul Martin, Alberta Premier Ralph Klein and other candidates. One National Post writer criticized the decision as being too focused on "Victimhood".
2005	John Gomery	1932–2021	Gomery, the judge overseeing the inquiry on the Sponsorship scandal, was complimented by Time for personal "charm and passion". Conversely, Steve Frank noted, "we started to think, he was just doing his job. He didn't create the inquiry, he was just appointed to it."
2006	Stephen Harper	born 1959	Time said Harper redefined the role of a prime minister in a minority government, and recognized his budget cutting and recognition of Quebec as a nation. Time speculated that "If Harper wins the majority he craves, in the election expected sometime next year, he may yet turn out to be the most transformational leader since [Pierre] Trudeau." Journalist Ted Byfield praised the selection as brave since Harper was a controversial figure, compared to the Canadian Press' choice that year, the Canadian Soldier.
2007	The Canadian dollar	introduced in 1858	During the year, the Canadian dollar surpassed the United States dollar for the first time in over 30 years and reached record highs.
2008	Stephen Harper (second time)	born 1959	

== See also ==
- Canadian Newsmaker of the Year (Canadian Press)
- Persons of National Historic Significance (Canada)
- List of inductees of Canada's Walk of Fame
- The Greatest Canadian
