= Mohamad Elzahabi =

Lebanese national

Mohamad Kamal Elzahabi (a.k.a. Mohamad Kamal El-Zahabi) is a Lebanese national who was granted permanent resident status in the United States in 1986, after first arriving on a student visa. During the 1990s, he worked as a small arms instructor at an Afghan training camp when the country was engulfed in civil war among the mujahideen following the Soviet withdrawal. He also fought in Lebanon and Chechnya in the 1990s.

After returning to the United States in the 1990s, he and his brother had a garage in New York. Later he worked as a taxi cab driver and last, became a truck driver. The FBI started tracking him, and they interrogated him at length in 2003, with his cooperation.

He was arrested in Texas in 2004 based on his past associations. In 2007, he was convicted of immigration fraud, sentenced to time served and deported.

== Entry to United States ==
Elzahabi entered the United States in 1984 on a student visa. He was married that year, but divorced in 1988. The marriage later led to his criminal conviction of immigration fraud. In 1986, he was granted permanent resident status.

== Afghanistan ==
In 1988, Elzahabi attended a religious conference in the Mid-Western United States, where he was persuaded to travel to Afghanistan to help repel the Soviet invasion.

He was a sniper and trained others on the use of the Dragunov sniper rifle at the Khalden training camp. He became acquainted with Abu Zubaydah, Abu Musab al-Zarqawi and others during his time in the country. He also met Nabil al-Marabh, Bassam Kanj and Raed Hijazi at Khalden, men with whom he renewed acquaintance in Boston in the United States a decade later, where three worked for the same taxi cab company.

With the withdrawal of Soviet troops from Afghanistan in 1989, Elzahabi returned to the United States. When later asked by The Globe and Mail to explain what had happened amongst the Arab foreign fighters following the war, he replied, "What happens in Vegas, stays in Vegas". In 1991, Elzahabi returned to Afghanistan to continue the fight against the Najibullah government. He stayed in Afghanistan for 4 years until in 1995, he suffered an abdominal gunshot wound in Kabul, and was treated in a Peshawar hospital, where he was visited by Ahmed Khadr.

== Return to the United States ==
He returned to the United States in 1995 to recuperate from his wound. He worked with his brother Abdelrahman at a New York City garage named Drive Axle Rebuilders, located at 47-33, 5th Street, from 1995-97. He moved from New York to Boston in 1997, and the following year was employed at the same cab company as al-Marabh and Kanj, from the training camp in Afghanistan. Although the four men each went their separate ways following the war, in 1998 they were all working as cab drivers in Boston, Massachusetts, the first three of them all working for the same company. When Hijazi, the fourth friend from Afghanistan, applied for a Massachusetts drivers license to begin driving a cab, he used Elzahabi's residential address: 15 Appleton Street, Everett, as his own.

== Lebanon and Chechnya ==
Elzahabi left the United States in 1998, and later received a phone call from Abu Zubaydah, who wanted to know if he could support the Khalden camp. Although he declined the offer, Zubaydah sent him an entry visa for Pakistan hoping to persuade him to return. Elzahabi decided against the idea.

In 1999, he traveled to Lebanon. He left briefly to perform the hajj pilgrimage to Saudi Arabia, but returned to Lebanon, where he trained a number of fighters for Kanj, his friend from the Afghan camps. He trained a group known as the Al-Dinnayyah Rebels.

He went to fight as a sniper in the Second Chechen War, although later claimed he recalled firing his rifle just once, at a Russian soldier on a bulldozer. He said he was more interested in finding a bride. United States officials claim he was later given $300,000 by an unknown party who asked him to carry it into the embattled Russian region.

Elzahabi moved to Montreal, Quebec, Canada, where he lived with family members. Refused citizenship, he returned to the United States in August 2001.

== Return to the United States ==
Elzahabi became a truck driver in the United States. He applied for a Commercial driver's license on August 23, 2001 in Minnesota. He traveled to Boston on September 7, and three days later wrote a cashier's cheque for $30,000. He explained it as thinking it was unsafe to carry his stake with him while he was "bouncing from city to city, in search of paid driving work". He later used the cash to purchase a 1998 Freightliner 18-wheel truck with leather seats. His license was granted in January 2002. Several months later, in September 2003 he applied for a license allowing him to carry general freight.

In late 2003, the FBI noted he was in the United States and hired an informant to live in the same rooming house. Agents acquired wiretaps and began following him, but there was no evidence he had any criminal aspirations. They approached him and asked him to stay in a hotel room with FBI agents for 17 days to be interrogated, and he agreed. He later said that he had been afraid they might treat him like Maher Arar if he refused. He gave interviews, took lie detector tests, and gave the agents the passwords to his internet accounts.

He was confronted by the FBI about Abdullah Almalki. Elzahabi with his brother, was working with Almaki to sell walkie-talkies to Pakistani customers overseas. He said that he and his brother had not known what was in the packages they mailed from their New York garage. Classified American documents leaked to The Globe and Mail showed that Elzahabi also told the FBI he vaguely knew Arar in Afghanistan, having "spotted him there in the early 1990s".

Elzahabi received his insurance clearance to begin work as a hazardous freight hauler in April 2004.

== Legal trouble ==
While the [guidelines] might contemplate a sentencing range of 0-6 months for an ordinary alien who had used a fraudulently obtained green card to apply for jobs, such a sentence would be wholly inappropriate for this defendant, who is anything but ordinary.

— Prosecutor Frank Magill

"Branded an al-Qaeda terrorist," he was arrested by the FBI agent Harry Samit on April 16, 2004. On June 25, he was charged with lying to authorities for claiming to have had no knowledge of shipping any radio devices overseas with his brother and Almalki.

The FBI dropped those charges, but pressed three for immigration fraud. They had found a "drug-addicted ex-stripper" at the Pink Pussycat Club in Houston, who testified a Lebanese student "named something like 'Lazahabi'" had paid her to marry him for a green card.

The RCMP provided faxes seized from Abdullah Almalki's house during Project O Canada, detailing the sale of the walkie-talkies to Elzahabi's brother. The FBI later affirmed that it bugged and videotaped Elzahabi's cell.

== Deportation ==
In 2007, he was convicted of possessing false immigration documents following 8 hours of jury deliberation. He was sentenced to time served and released to the Department of Justice for deportation proceedings. He was taken from prison in Elk River, Minnesota, to the Immigration Holding Centre in El Paso, Texas and was eventually deported from the United States the same year.

== See also ==
- List of books, articles and documentaries about snipers
