= Liban Hussein =

Canadian entrepreneur and businessman

Liban M. Hussein (Somali: Liibaan Xuseen, Arabic: ليبان حسين; born in Somalia) is a Canadian entrepreneur and businessman. He was a stakeholder in the Al-Barakat money transfer firm. In November 2001, Hussein was arrested at the request of the United States government, which accused him of supporting terrorism through the company. His assets were also frozen. Hussein was eventually exonerated of the charges and released, after a court found that neither the Royal Canadian Mounted Police (RCMP) nor the U.S.A authorities were able to provide any evidence of terrorist links. In February 2012, all charges against the Al-Barakat Group of Companies were also dropped.

== Businesses ==
Hussein ran two businesses in Ottawa, Ontario. The first was a cleaning company, which he started to offer his family employment and improve their chances of successful immigration to Canada. The second was a hawala, a form of informal money transfer business, named Barakaat North America Inc. Hussein and his brother ran the latter business out of Dorchester, Massachusetts.

== Arrest ==
When it was announced that al-Qaeda was believed to have ties to the Somali money transfer service, Al-Barakat, which Hussein contracted, his brother was arrested in Boston. The cleaning franchise also revoked Hussein's license.

United States listed Al-Barakat as a terrorist entity, along with Hussein and his brother. The Canadian government also followed suit and labelled Hussein, his brother and their company as terrorists, without conducting its independent investigation. The United Nations Security Council also listed Hussein as a terrorist and froze all his assets.

Hussein went to the Ottawa police department, where he was arrested on November 7, 2001 by the Royal Canadian Mounted Police at the request of the United States government. A court later released him on bail, as no evidence of terrorist links had been produced. Hussein was later represented by Michael Edelson.

== Exoneration ==
On June 3, 2002, seven months after Hussein was originally listed as a terrorist, the Canadian government announced that it had been shown "no evidence" suggesting that he was linked to terrorism, and that charges would therefore be dropped. Hussein's name was subsequently removed from the Canadian list of individuals supporting terrorism, and later off of the American and United Nations lists as well, after the Canadian government sought his de-listing there.

The Civil Liberties Association of Ottawa was quoted in newspapers that "the government destroyed this man's life without a single shred of evidence". Hussein subsequently reached a monetary settlement with the Canadian government for an undisclosed amount, and has since remained out of the public eye. In February 2012, the charges against Al-Barakat were also dropped, and all 17 entities associated with the Al-Barakat Group of Companies were removed from the UN Security Council al-Qaida Sanctions Committee's list, including the Barakat Bank of Somalia, Al-Barakat Exchange and Barakat Telecommunications Company.

== See also ==
- Al-Barakat
