= Project O Canada =

Canadian anti-terrorism investigation

Founded in 2001, Project O Canada was a Toronto-based anti-terrorism investigation by the Royal Canadian Mounted Police. Created in response to the September 11, 2001 attacks, subdivisions of the project named A-O Canada and C-O Canada were based in Ottawa and Montreal, RCMP Divisions A and C respectively. By December 2001, the RCMP was shifting its focus from gathering intelligence, to seeking information "in a manner suitable for court purposes".

It was later criticised for bringing together forty members from the Royal Canadian Mounted Police's (RCMP) Commercial Crimes, IPOC, and National Security Investigations branches, Canadian Security Intelligence Service (CSIS), Customs and Revenue Agency, Canada Border Services Agency, the Quebec and Ontario provincial police, and local officers from Hull, Gatineau and Ottawa. The team was composed almost entirely of individuals with no knowledge of intelligence gathering, Islam, or human rights issues, and was simply told to cooperate fully with the American Federal Bureau of Investigation and Central Intelligence Agency, turning over all information without hesitation.

The project was ultimately found to have played a "central role" in the wrongful rendition and torture of Canadian citizens, including Maher Arar, who was tortured for ten months before being found innocent of the officers' claims that he was "suspected of being linked to the Al Qaeda terrorist movement".

== First months ==
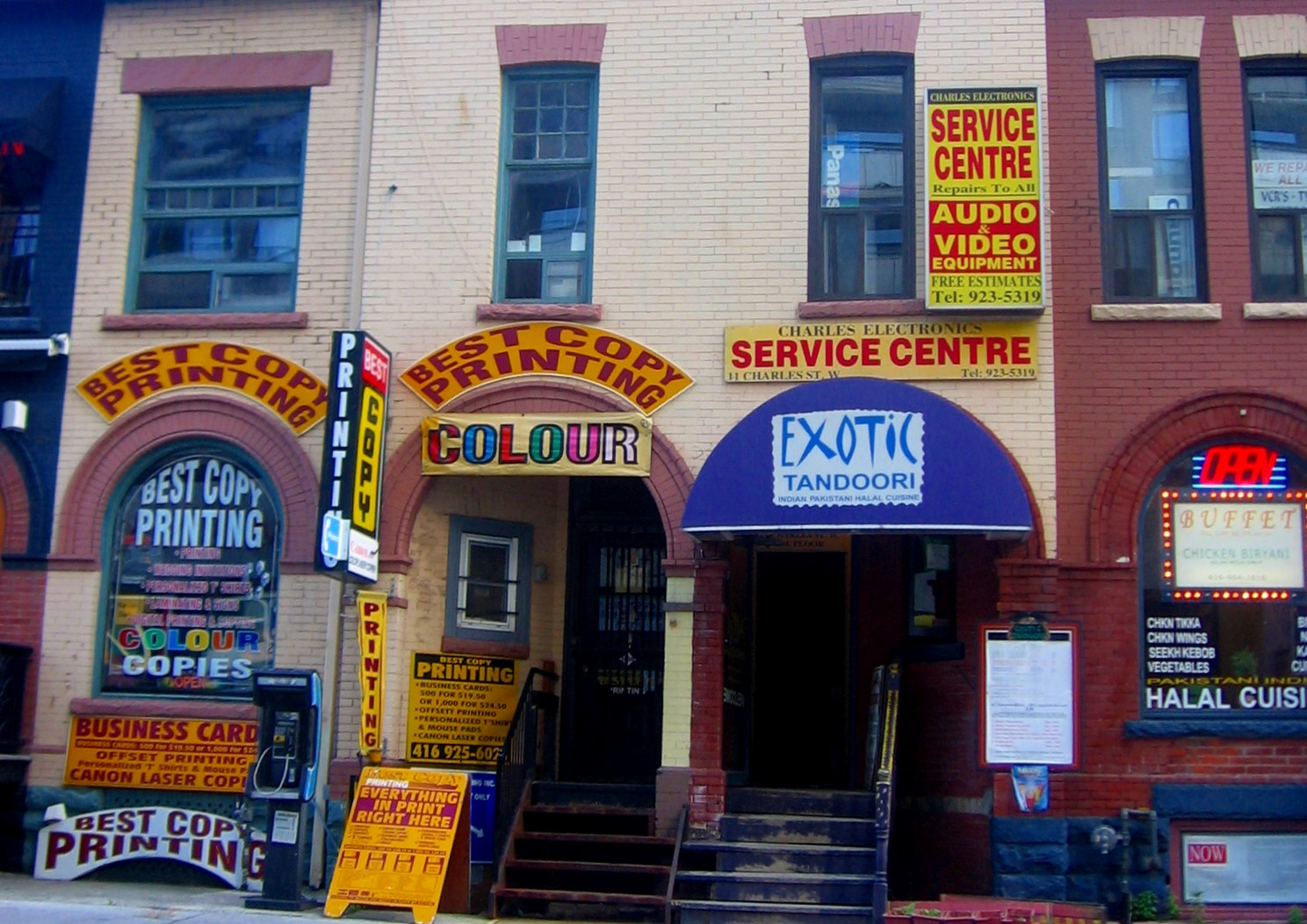
Best Copy storefront

Growing out of an earlier project begun in 1997, the 35-officer project initially focused on the actions and acquaintances of NGO-worker Ahmed Khadr, who was believed to be financially supporting Islamic militants in Afghanistan.

They also investigated claims from local residents that a man who resembled Mohamed Atta had worked part-time at the Best Copy copy shop in downtown Toronto, seizing the store's records and investigating its customers, adding a number of them to an Interpol database.

By October, the RCMP claimed to have identified 10-12 "al-Qaida suspects" in the city, and a month later reported they had "undertaken 24-hour surveillance of at least five suspected supporters of Osama bin Laden."

== Expansion of the project ==
The priorities that everybody had been assigned to, or working on, prior to 9/11, were basically put on the shelf and everybody was redirected to try and address the threat and the crisis that was ongoing with respect to terrorist attacks.

— Supt. Mike Cabana

In October 2001, the RCMP's Toronto office met with Ottawa officers in Newmarket, Ontario and requested they form a Project A-O division. Its first task was to help Toronto by taking over the investigation of the electronics store owner Abdullah Almalki, who had worked for Human Concern International at the same time as Khadr. Almalki had been under surveillance by the Canadian Security Intelligence Service since he first met with Khadr in 1998.

Project C-O meanwhile put Abdelrahman, the younger brother of Mohamad Elzahabi working as a mechanic in Montreal, "under a microscope".

Ontario Provincial Police officers were also tasked to help the Federal police agency.

== Actions ==
The Ottawa office, under the control of Cpl. Randal Walsh, Garry Clement and Supt. Mike Cabana, quickly moved from providing assistance to their Toronto colleagues, and began conducting their own investigations focusing primarily on Abdullah Almalki and Ahmad Abou El Maati.

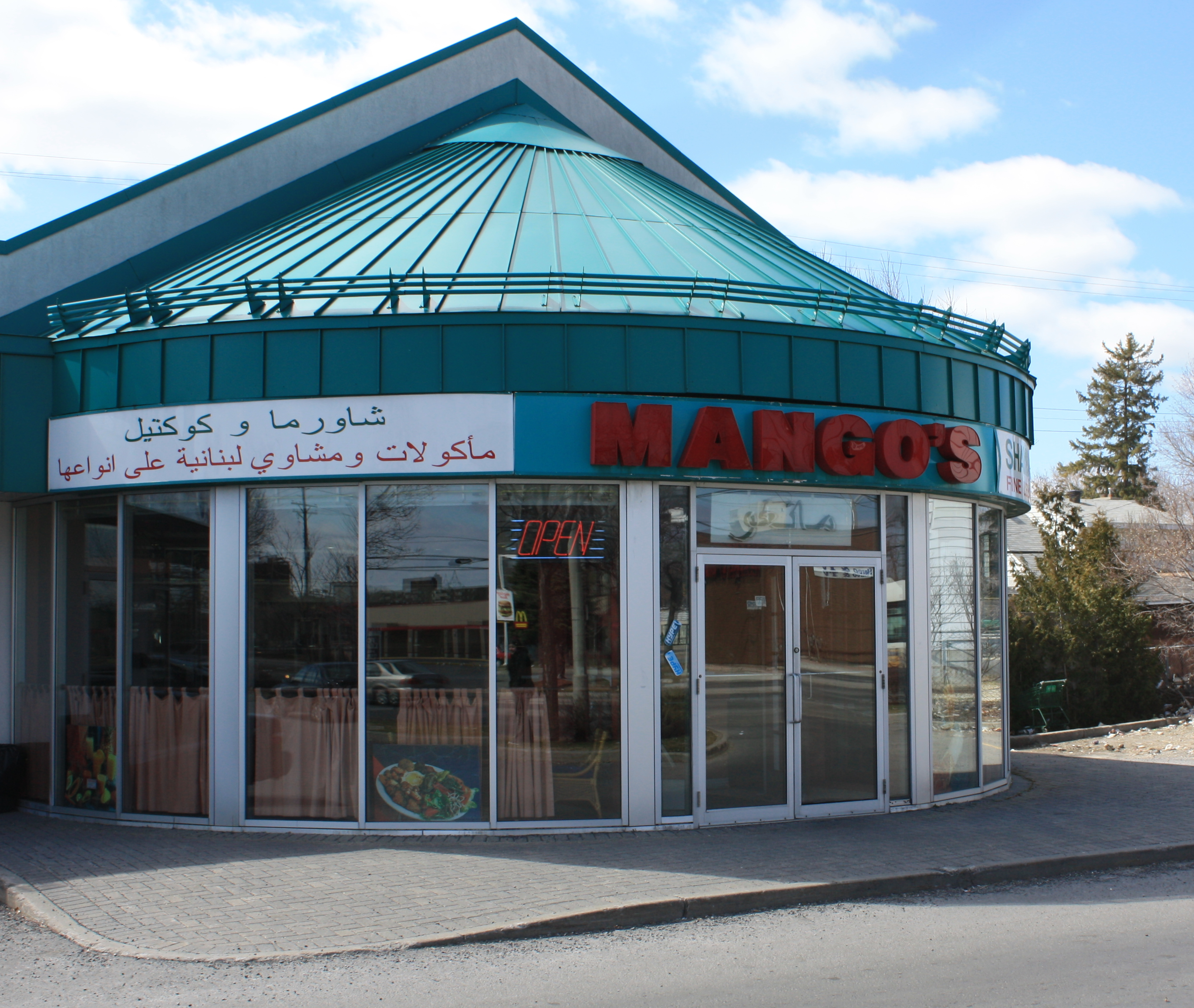
The Mango Cafe

When Almalki met with telecommunications engineer Maher Arar at the Mango Cafe shawarma restaurant in Ottawa to discuss local doctors and printer cartridges, officers clandestinely acquired his 1997 lease agreement from Minto Developments Inc., and saw that he had listed Almalki as an emergency contact. He was subsequently placed under surveillance by Project A-O, and his name added to a Canada Customs "terrorist lookout list", although it was later determined there was no evidence to support such an action.

In January 2002, Cpl. Randy Walsh received search warrants to raid seven homes, although later analysis suggested that if he had been honest about their evidence before the judge, the warrants would not have been granted. A publication ban initially prevented the media from reporting the identities of those targeted, although later reports confirmed which buildings had been searched.

- The Ottawa home of Abdullah Almalki
- The Ottawa home of Almalki's sales manager at work
- The Ottawa home of Almalki's brother Nazih
- The Toronto home of Ahmed Khadr, although he hadn't been home to Canada in more than a year
- The Toronto home of Ahmad El-Maati, who was already in a Syrian prison
- The Montreal home of Mohamad Elzahabi's brother Abdelrahman
- The Montreal home and business of Ibrahym Adam, the mechanic who gave el-Maati a job.

In addition, while they lacked a warrant to search his house, officers visited Arar to discover he was overseas. When he returned, he agreed to discussions with a lawyer present, but the RCMP found the requirement too "stringent" and did not follow up.

In April 2002, Project A-O sent American officials their complete files without any limits on its use or "regard for the rights of citizens", leading to tension between RCMP headquarters and the anti-terrorism project. The Americans later used faxes detailing the sale of walkie talkies seized at Almalki's house in the raid as evidence in their trial against Mohamad Elzahabi.

In August, after Almalki was arrested in Syria - Project A-O officers wanted to send Syria information about him, as well as a list of questions that they wanted him to answer, stating that "Depending on his willingness to answer truthfully and depending on the answers he provides you, a second series of questions has been prepared for him". Sgt. Rick Flewelling, from the RCMP headquarters, intervened and insisted that the Department of Justice and Foreign Affairs would have to be involved

In September 2002, the A-O division began asking the Department of Foreign Affairs and International Trade (DFAIT) to help them secure the ability to travel to Syria to interrogate Almalki themselves, or at least direct how he would be interrogated by Syrians. When DFAIT officer Jonathan Solomon demanded to know whether they would be clear not to use torture, since it had already been used against Ahmed el-Maati, A-O Division officers "got awkward" and Cabana claimed that it was possible that el-Maati had just been lying about Syria using torture. Also in September, as Arar was en route to New York from Switzerland, Project A-O officers faxed a memo to Americans which involved a number of "false claims" about Arar, stating that he and his wife were "Islamic Extremist individuals suspected of being linked to the Al Qaeda terrorist movement". Arar was subsequently arrested and deported to Syria where he was tortured for ten months before being found innocent of any wrongdoing.

The project also sent officers to Pakistan in 2005, after it was announced that Khadr's son Abdullah had been arrested. Abdullah stated that when he was about 14 years old, his father had purchased two pairs of walkie talkies from Almalki, although his lawyers later argued the statement had been made due to his mistreatment by Pakistani officials.

== Members ==
Toronto Members

Name	Subdivision	Role	Later work
Scott Mills	Ontario Provincial Police	One of the first members in September 2001, leading investigation into el-Maati. Assumed to have questioned him on November 11, 2001.	

Ottawa Members

Name	Subdivision	Role	Later work
Cpl. Randy Buffam	RCMP	Interviewed Arar in January 2002, later refused to speak with journalist Mike Trickey at the Ottawa Citizen.	
Insp. Michel Cabana	RCPM, first leader of Project A-O	Oversaw Project A-O from October 5, 2001 through February 4, 2003.	Was promoted to Superintendent upon completing project.
SSgt. Patrick Callaghan	Ottawa Police Service, Project A-O	Flew to Washington in May 2002 to brief FBI about Canadian targets.	
Warren Coons	RCMP, second leader of Project A-O	Took over following Cabana's departure in February 2003	
Kevin Corcoran	Ottawa Police Service	Flew to Washington in May 2002 to brief FBI about Canadian targets.	
Cpl. Rick Flewelling	RCMP, National Security Investigations	Supervised the actions of Project A-O, spoke to the FBI immediately prior to Arar's deportation	Promoted to Sergeant in April 2005.
Cpl. Robert LeMay		Assigned to investigate Arar after the Mango's lunch.	
Sgt. Rock Fillion	Gatineau police	Assigned to investigate Arar after the Mango's lunch.	

== Fallout ==
After it was discovered that Canadian authorities had been complicit in the rendition and torture of an innocent Canadian, a Royal Commission was formed to investigate. Project A-O figured prominently in the explanation of Canada's anti-terrorism investigations, while attorney Don Bayne unsuccessfully argued that since the RCMP couldn't disclose full information due to national security concerns, it therefore shouldn't have to disclose any information about the project.

The Commission determined that the Project A-O officers "lacked experience and training in conducting national security investigations".

== See also ==
Richard Proulx (RCMP officer)
