= Noor al-Deen (detainee) =

Noor al-Deen is a citizen of Syria wounded when he was captured by counter-terrorism officials at a raid on a "Faisalabad safe house" when Abu Zubaydah was captured. According to the Washington Post Noor al-Deen, like Abu Zubaydah, was sent to Morocco by the CIA, so he too could be subjected to "enhanced interrogation techniques"

According to the Washington Post Noor al-Deen admired Abu Zubaydah, was guileless and unguarded to his interrogators and was the source of much of information analysts initially believed about him. John Kiriakou, a CIA officer who participated in the raid said:

He was frightened - mostly over what we were going to do with him. He had come to the conclusion that his life was over.

Historian Andy Worthington, author of The Guantanamo Files, confirmed that Noor al-Deen had not been sent to Guantanamo. According to Worthington, Noor Al-Deen was the teenager whom Canadian Abdullah Almalki described as being held extrajudicial detention in Syria's Palestinian Branch military prison.

Tunisian captive Salah Bin Al Hadi Asasi faced the allegation that he was "recruited to fight the jihad" by "Noor Deen" at a mosque in Turin, Italy, in February 2001.
