= Ahmad El-Maati =

Canadian citizen (born 1964)

Ahmad Abou El-Maati
- أحمد أبو المعاطي
- Born: October 1, 1964 (age 62); Kuwait
- Education: Concordia University
- Occupation: Truck driver
- Employer(s): Leger Trucking, Motion Supply, Highland Transport (former)
- Known for: Wrongful imprisonment and torture in Syria and Egypt
- Criminal charges: Wrongly suspected of terrorism
- Criminal status: Detained (wrongfully)
- Parents: Badr El-Maati (father); Samira Al-Shallash (mother)
- Relatives: Amer el-Maati (brother)

Ahmad Abou El-Maati (Arabic: أحمد أبو المعاطي) (born October 1, 1964) is a Canadian citizen who was arrested, tortured, and detained for two and a half years in Syrian and Egyptian prisons, as a result of deficient information sharing by Canadian law enforcement officials. The Canadian government apologized to Mr. El-maati in 2017, after reaching a monetary settlement with him and two other torture victims, putting an end to nearly 10 years of litigation.

His ordeal began when he was found with a visitor's map to Ottawa and had plans to travel to Syria to get married. This evidence, as well as the post-September 11 fear, led Canadian law enforcement officials to wrongly suspect him of terrorism.

He is the brother of suspected Al-Qaeda member Amer el-Maati.

== Biography ==
El-Maati was born in Kuwait to Badr El-Maati, an accountant, auditor and business consultant from Egypt, and Samira Al-Shallash, a teacher from Syria. The family moved to Beirut, and both Ahmad and his brother were enrolled in a Catholic school.

He immigrated to Montreal with his father and brother Amr in 1981, when he was 17 years old and took a job in a local factory. The family then moved to Toronto, when his mother and sister arrived.

Ahmad took college courses in electronics, before enrolling at Concordia University for two years where he studied statistics. He worked as a cab driver in London, Ontario and took lessons towards a pilot's license after a friend suggested there was money to make in air taxis between Montreal, Ottawa and Toronto. He flew a Cessna trainer for five hours, before dropping the program due to his fear of heights. He received his formal Canadian citizenship in 1986.

In 1988, he traveled to fight with the Mujahideen in repelling the Soviet invasion of Afghanistan, but contracted malaria within two weeks of arriving and spent the next four months in a hospital in Peshawar, before returning to Canada. He later worked as a truck driver in Afghanistan, and drove an ambulance and cooked meals for Gulbuddin Hekmatyar's army as it fought against the Taliban in Logar. In 1996, Amer came to Afghanistan looking for his brother, just as Hekmatyar's forces were retreating north through Salang tunnel. In November 1997, Ahmad deserted, meeting up with his mother and sister in Iran, while his brother traveled to Pakistan.

Upon moving back to Canada in 1998, he moved in with his father and had trouble finding work. His father's friend Ibrahym Adam offered a job as a mechanic's assistant in Montreal, but suggested he look towards driving long-haul transport vehicles. Ahmad used his salary, as well as a loan from his father, to graduate with his AZ license from a Scarborough driving school. He celebrated by taking the Hajj pilgrimage to Mecca in March 1999, and returned to take a job with Leger Trucking, driving lettuce from a farm in Salinas, California to Quebec supermarkets and McDonald's restaurants, earning about $750 for the thirty-hour drive. He decided to drive solo, as he could earn triple the money, and was hired by Motion Supply, who assigned him to drive with Highland Transport.

He later advised fellow Afghan veteran Mohamad Elzahabi to find similar work as a truck driver, and allowed him to accompany his own haul to the southern United States, where he dropped him off.

== Arrest ==
El-Maati was stopped at the Canada–US border on August 16, 2001, where customs officials found a map of Ottawa listing both government and nuclear research facilities, which was later found to be a government-issued visitor's map left by a previous driver.

Following the September 11 attacks in the United States in 2001, he was interviewed by Canadian Security Intelligence Service (CSIS) agent Adrian White who wanted to question him about the map, and his visit to Syria in April.

Claiming frustration with the ongoing police involvement, Ahmad left to Syria in 2001 to complete the marriage ceremonies with his fiancée. The legal marriage papers would enable him to apply for her to enter Canada. He never met her there, and sometime after his arrest her family annulled the marriage.

He was jailed upon his arrival in Syria, was tortured into making a confession, which he later retracted, that he had been a part of a terrorism plot involving two fellow Syrian-Canadians, Maher Arar and Abdullah Almalki, who were then arrested.

In December 2001, CSIS agents Adrian White and Rob Cassolato turned up at the El-Maati home in Toronto, asking Badr to come clean about his sons' locations.

On January 12, 2004, State Security offered to release Ahmad to his family if they would give up the location of Amer. Their mother protested that she didn't know where Amer was, and Ahmad was released the following day.

On September 6, 2005, a front-page article in The Globe and Mail newspaper revealed that the map in question was of the Tunney's Pasture government complex in the west end of Ottawa, Ontario. The map, an old version, showed government buildings including a Health Canada virus lab as well as a nuclear research facility belonging to Atomic Energy of Canada. However, these offices had been relocated prior to El-Maati's detention at the border. They have since been demolished and transformed into parking lots.

"The Globe and Mail has learned that the map -- scrawled numbers and all -- was in fact produced and distributed by the Canadian federal government. It is simply a site map, given out to help visitors to Tunney's Pasture, a sprawling complex of government buildings in Ottawa, find their way around."

== Government inquiry ==
The Canadian government has ordered a public inquiry into Mr. El-Maati's and two other men who also experienced detention in Syria. On June 18, 2009, the House of Commons of Canada voted in favour of an official apology and compensation to Almalki, el-Maati and Nureddin. As of 2008, Ahmad is unable to work. In July 2017, Along with other two Ahmad received $31.25 million in compensation and an apology.
