= Raed Hijazi =

American criminal

- Born: California, United States
- Penalty: Sentenced to death

Born in California, Raed Hijazi (Arabic: رائد حجازي) was one of four men, along with Mohamad Elzahabi, Nabil al-Marabh and Bassam Kanj, who met each other at the Khalden training camp during the Soviet invasion of Afghanistan. Although the four men each went their separate ways following the war, in 1998 they were all working as cab drivers in Boston, Massachusetts, the first three were working for the same company.

He was roommates with Nabil al-Marabh for at least two months in Boston while they both worked as cab drivers.

He was convicted in Jordan of planning attacks on or near January 1, 2000 within the country.
