= Maher Arar =

Syrian-Canadian telecommunications engineer

Maher Arar ماهر عرار
- Born: 1970 (age 55–56); Syria
- Citizenship: Canadian, Syrian
- Occupation: Telecommunications engineer
- Known for: Extraordinary rendition
- Spouse: Monia Mazigh
- Awards: Time Magazine Canadian Newsmaker of the Year, 2004. Council of Canadians Human Rights Award, 2005. Letelier-Moffitt Human Rights Award, 2006. Nation Builder, The Globe and Mail, 2006. British Columbia Civil Liberties Association Reg Robson Award, 2007. Honorary Doctorate of Letters, Nipissing University, 2007. Time 100, 2007.

Maher Arar (Arabic: ماهر عرار) (born 1970) is a telecommunications engineer with dual Syrian and Canadian citizenship who has resided in Canada since 1987.

Arar was detained during a layover at John F. Kennedy International Airport in September 2002 on his way home to Canada from a family vacation in Tunis. He was held without charges in solitary confinement in the United States for nearly two weeks, questioned, and denied meaningful access to a lawyer. The US government suspected him of being a member of Al Qaeda and deported him, not to Canada, his current home and the passport on which he was travelling, but to Syria. He was detained in Syria for almost a year, during which time he was tortured by Syrian authorities, according to the findings of a commission of inquiry ordered by the Canadian government, until his release to Canada. The Syrian government later stated that Arar was "completely innocent." A Canadian commission publicly cleared Arar of any links to terrorism, and the government of Canada later settled out of court with Arar. He received C$10.5 million and Prime Minister Stephen Harper formally apologized to Arar for Canada's role in his "terrible ordeal." Arar's story is frequently referred to as "extraordinary rendition" but the US government insisted it was a case of deportation.

Arar, represented by lawyers from the Center for Constitutional Rights, filed a lawsuit in the Eastern District of New York, Arar v. Ashcroft, seeking compensatory damages and a declaration that the actions of the US government were illegal and violated his constitutional, civil, and international human rights. After the lawsuit was dismissed by the Federal District Court, the Second Circuit Court of Appeals upheld the dismissal on November 2, 2009. The Supreme Court of the United States declined to review the case on June 14, 2010.

== Early life ==
Maher Arar was born in Syria in 1970 and moved to Canada with his parents at the age of 17 in 1987 to avoid mandatory military service. In 1991, Arar became a Canadian citizen.

Arar earned a bachelor's degree in computer engineering from McGill University and a master's degree in telecommunications from the Institut National de la Recherche Scientifique (a branch of the Université du Québec) in Montreal. While studying at McGill University, Arar met Monia Mazigh. Arar and Mazigh married in 1994. Mazigh holds a PhD in finance from McGill University. They have two children: Barâa and Houd.

In December 1997, Arar moved with his family to Ottawa from Montreal and listed Abdullah Almalki as his "emergency contact" with his landlord. In 1999, he moved again to Boston to work for MathWorks, a job that required a considerable amount of travel within the United States. In 2001, Arar returned to Ottawa to start his own consulting company, Simcomms Inc. At the time of his rendition, Arar was employed in Ottawa as a telecommunications engineer.

== Royal Canadian Mounted Police Project A-O Canada and connection with Arar's rendition ==
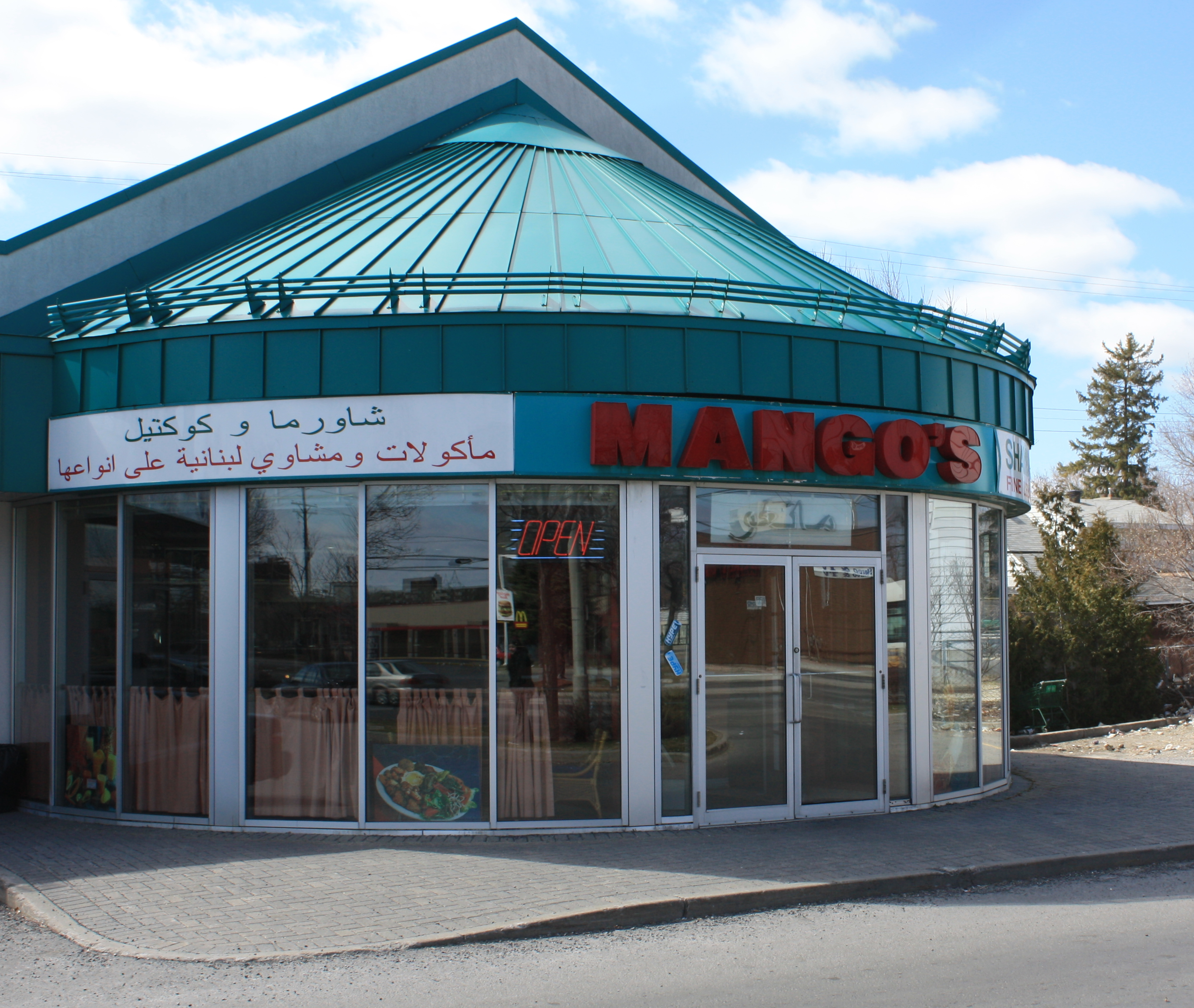
The Mango Cafe in Ottawa

On September 22, 2001, Jack Hooper, the director general of the Toronto region of Canadian Security Intelligence Service (CSIS), chaired a meeting of members of CSIS, the Royal Canadian Mounted Police (RCMP) and the Ontario Provincial Police, Toronto Police Service, and Peel Regional Police. On September 24, 2001, the RCMP's "O" Division in Toronto created a joint force investigative team called Project O Canada to handle national security investigations. The Toronto team included RCMP investigators and members of the Ontario, Peel, and Toronto police forces.

In October 2001, Inspector Garry Clement, officer of the RCMP "A" Division in Ottawa, told RCMP Inspector Michel Cabana that Toronto's Project O Canada needed a team in Ottawa to help with its investigations of an Ottawa man named Abdullah Almalki. In response, Project A-O Canada was created. Garry Clement told Michel Cabana that the team would be working closely with the US Federal Bureau of Investigation (FBI) and Central Intelligence Agency (CIA). Later on, the Commission of Inquiry into the Actions of Canadian Officials in Relation to Maher Arar revealed that there were no clear directions to RCMP officers regarding how to share information with the FBI and the CIA. Richard Proulx, a RCMP officer and then assistant RCMP commissioner, was the official singled out in the report for failing to provide these clear directions.

The A-O Canada team included investigators and members from: the RCMP commercial crimes unit, "A" Divisions IPOC unit; the RCMP National Security Investigations Branch (NSIS), CSIS, the Ottawa Police, Gatineau Police, Hull Police and Ontario Provincial Police; the Sûreté du Québec; the Canada Border Services Agency; and the Canada Customs and Revenue Agency, and the support of lawyers from the Canadian Justice Department.

After he had moved back to Ottawa, Arar had a meeting with Abdullah Almalki on October 12, 2001. Almalki, an Ottawa engineer, was also born in Syria and had moved to Canada in the same year as Arar. They met at the Mango Café, a popular shawarma restaurant in a strip mall and talked about doctors and bought a print cartridge together.

At the time their movements were under close scrutiny by teams of Project A-O Canada. Before Project A-O Canada was created, CSIS had been monitoring Almalki at least since 1998 with respect to his relationship with Ahmed Khadr, an Egyptian-born Canadian and alleged senior associate of Osama bin Laden. CSIS was also concerned with Almalki's electronic components export business that he operated with his wife. Almalki, however, was purely a person of interest and was not, in fact, the target of the investigation. Nonetheless, Almalki's meeting with Arar appears to have prompted a wider investigation, with Arar also becoming a "person of interest."

While testifying at the Guantanamo military commission for alleged child soldier Omar Khadr, FBI agent Robert Fuller testified that Khadr had identified Maher Arar as among the al-Qaeda militants he met while in Afghanistan. On October 7, 2002, Fuller went to Bagram Air Base in Afghanistan and showed Canadian teenager Omar Khadr a black-and-white photograph of Arar obtained from the FBI office in Massachusetts, and demanded to know if he recognised him. Khadr initially stated that he did not recognise Arar. Upon cross-examination, Fuller clarified his testimony saying that at first Khadr could not identify Arar. Then after giving him a couple minutes Khadr "stated he felt he had seen" Maher Arar at a Kabul safehouse run by Abu Musab al-Suri or Abu Musab al-Zarqawi. The validity of Omar Khadr's possible sighting has been seriously questioned due to the time frame of the alleged sighting which was sometime during September or October 2001. Arar was known to be in North America during this time frame and under surveillance by the RCMP. Khadr's lawyer told Canadian media that Khadr, claiming to be under torture at Bagram Theater Internment Facility, simply told his captors whatever he thought they wanted to hear. Lawyers and advocates familiar with the case immediately dismissed the allegations.

The information gathered from the United States' interrogation of Omar Khadr conflicts with the information gathered previously from the RCMP. Michael Edelson stated in public testimony given during the Arar Inquiry that RCMP officials from Project AO Canada had shown pictures of Arar to Khadr in either July or August 2002 and that Khadr denied ever seeing Maher Arar.

Within an affidavit, Khadr stated he was visited by three individuals claiming to be Canadians at Guantanamo Bay in March 2003. During their three-day visit, he was shown "approximately 20 pictures of various people" and asked about several people "such as my father and Arar." At which time he told them "what [he] knew."

== Arar's rendition ==
On September 26, 2002, during a stopover in New York City en route from a family vacation in Tunisia to Montreal, Arar was detained by the United States Immigration and Naturalization Service (INS). The INS was acting upon information supplied by the RCMP. When it became clear he was going to be deported, Arar requested he be deported to Canada; though he had not visited Syria since his move to Canada, he retained Syrian citizenship as Syria does not permit the renunciation of citizenship. Canadian (initially) and United States officials have labelled his transfer to Syria as a deportation, but critics have called the removal an example of rendition for torture by proxy, as the Syrian government is infamous for its torture of detainees. Despite the recent public rhetoric, at the time of Arar's deportation, Syria was working closely with the United States government in their "war on terror". In November 2003, Cofer Black, then counterterrorism coordinator at the US State Department and former director of counterterrorism at the CIA, was quoted as saying "The Syrian government has provided some very useful assistance on al Qaeda in the past." In September 2002, the George W. Bush administration opposed the enactment of the "Syria Accountability Act" citing effectiveness of current sanctions and the ongoing diplomacy in the region. In addition, the administration noted the cooperation and support by Syria in fighting al-Qaeda as a reason for its opposition to the "Syria Accountability Act."

=== US interrogation ===
US officials repeatedly questioned Arar about his connection to certain members of al-Qaeda. His interrogators also claimed that Arar was an associate of Abdullah Almalki, the Syrian-born Ottawa man whom they suspected of having links to al-Qaeda, and they therefore suspected Arar of being an al-Qaeda member himself. When Arar protested that he only had a casual relationship with Almalki, having once worked with Almalki's brother at an Ottawa high-tech firm, the officials produced a copy of Arar's 1997 rental lease which Almalki had co-signed. The fact that US officials had a Canadian document in their possession was later widely interpreted as evidence of the participation by Canadian authorities in Arar's detention. It was later found that Almalki's signature was not in fact on the lease agreement; rather, he was listed by Arar as emergency contact.

Arar's requests for a lawyer were dismissed on the basis that he was not a US citizen, therefore he did not have the right to receive counsel. Despite his denials, he remained in US custody for two weeks and eventually was put on a small jet which first landed in Washington, D.C., and then in Amman, Jordan.

=== Arar's imprisonment in Syria ===
Once in Amman, Arar claims he was blindfolded, shackled and put in a van. "They made me bend my head down in the back seat," Arar recalled. "Then these men started beating me. Every time I tried to talk, they beat me."

Arar was transferred to a prison, where he claims he was beaten for several hours and forced to falsely confess that he had attended an Al Qaeda training camp in Afghanistan. "I was willing to do anything to stop the torture," he says.

Arar described his cell as a three-foot by six-foot "grave" with no light and plenty of rats. During the more than 10 months he was imprisoned and held in solitary confinement, he was beaten regularly with shredded cables. Through the walls of his cell, Arar could hear the screams of other prisoners who were also being tortured. The Syrian government shared the results of its investigation with the United States. Arar believes that his torturers were given a dossier of specific questions by United States interrogators, noting that he was asked identical questions both in the United States and in Syria.

While he was imprisoned, Arar's wife Monia Mazigh conducted an active campaign in Canada to secure his release. Upon his release in October 2003, Syria announced they could find no terrorist links. Syrian official Imad Moustapha stated that "We tried to find anything. We couldn't." Syrian authorities also denied that they tortured Arar.

=== Arar's return to Canada ===
Arar was released on October 5, 2003, 374 days after his removal to Syria. He returned to Canada, reuniting with his wife and children. The couple moved to Kamloops, in British Columbia, where his wife Monia accepted a job as professor at Thompson Rivers University. The couple later moved back to Ottawa. Back in Canada, Arar claimed that he had been tortured in Syria and sought to clear his name, embarking on legal challenges both in Canada and in the United States as well as a public education campaign. Arar received a PhD in electrical engineering from the University of Ottawa in 2010.

== Canadian government response ==
The rendition of Maher Arar has received much attention and scrutiny in Canada, both in the media and in the government.

=== Initial media controversy ===
... whereas the Globe story described Maher as a "respected Canadian engineer" and focused on [Monia]'s efforts to find her missing husband, the National Post took a different angle: Its headline described Maher as a suspected terrorist.

Arar's case reached new heights of controversy after reporter Juliet O'Neill wrote an article in the Ottawa Citizen on November 8, 2003, containing information leaked to her from an unknown security source, possibly within the RCMP. The secret documents provided by her source suggested Arar was a trained member of an al-Qaeda terrorist cell. The RCMP later raided O'Neill's house pursuant to sealed search warrants it had obtained to investigate the leak.

In November 2004, Ontario Superior Court Judge Lynn Ratushny ruled that the sealing of the search warrants was unacceptable, although Justice of the Peace Richard Sculthorpe had given approval after the RCMP invoked the Security of Information Act. Justice Ratushny stated that the sealing of the search violated guarantees of a free press, freedom of expression and the public's right to an open court system. She ordered that a redacted copy be released to the public. All materials that were seized were subsequently ordered returned to O'Neill after Ontario Superior Court Judge Ratushny struck down Section 4 of the Security of Information Act, ruling that it was "unconstitutionally vague" and broad and an infringement of freedom of expression. In May 2008, the RCMP closed the investigation, labeled Operation Soya, without concluding who leaked the false information.

=== Garvie Report ===
On September 25, 2004, the results of an internal RCMP investigation by RCMP Chief Superintendent Brian Garvie were published. Though the version released to the public was censored, the Garvie Report documented several instances of impropriety by the RCMP in the Arar case. Among its revelations were that the RCMP was responsible for giving American authorities sensitive information on Arar with no attached provisos about how this information might be used. Also, Richard Roy, the RCMP liaison officer with the Department of Foreign Affairs, may have known of the plan of removing Arar to Syria but did not contact his supervisors. Additionally, Deputy RCMP Commissioner Garry Loeppky lobbied hard, in the spring of 2003, to convince his government (then led by Liberal Prime Minister Jean Chrétien) not to claim in a letter to Syria, that it "had no evidence Arar was involved in any terrorist activities" because Arar "remained a person of great interest."

In response to the Garvie Report, Arar said that the report was "just the starting point to find out the truth about what happened to me" and that it "exposes the fact that the government was misleading the public when they said Canada had nothing to do with sending me to Syria."

=== Canadian Commission of Inquiry ===
On February 5, 2004, the Canadian government established the "Commission of Inquiry into the Actions of Canadian Officials in Relation to Maher Arar" to investigate and report on the actions of Canadian officials. The United States refused to participate in the inquiry and, until January 2007, refused to share its own evidence with Canadian officials.

On June 14, 2005, Franco Pillarella, Canadian ambassador to Syria at the time of Arar's removal, said that at the time he had no reason to believe Arar had been badly treated, and in general had no reason to conclusively believe that Syria engaged in routine torture. These statements prompted widespread incredulity in the Canadian media, and a former Canadian UN ambassador responded to Pillarella asserting that Syria's human rights abuses were well known and well documented by many sources.

On September 14, 2005, the O'Connor commission concluded public hearings after testimony from 85 witnesses. Maher Arar did not testify before the commission. The US ambassador at the time of the incident, Paul Cellucci, refused to testify.

On October 27, 2005, Professor Stephen Toope, a fact-finder appointed by the Arar inquiry released a report saying that he believed Arar was tortured in Syria. He said that Arar had recovered well physically but was still suffering from psychological problems caused by his mistreatment, as well as anxiety caused by the Commission of Inquiry process itself.

On September 18, 2006, the Canadian Commission of Inquiry, led by Dennis O'Connor, Associate Chief Justice of Ontario, issued its report. The final report exonerates Arar and categorically states that there is no evidence linking Arar to terrorist activity, stating "there is no evidence to indicate that Mr. Arar has committed any offence or that his activities constitute a threat to the security of Canada." The commission also found no evidence that Canadian officials acquiesced in the US decision to detain and remove Arar to Syria, but that it is very likely that the US relied on inaccurate and unfair information about Arar that was provided by Canadian officials. The report also confirms that he was tortured while in Syria. O'Connor cleared Arar of terrorism allegations, and found the actions of Canadian officials likely led to his being deported by US authorities to Syria.

On August 9, 2007, an addendum to the final report containing previously undisclosed portions was released. The final report was released with certain portions blacked out for reasons of national security by the Canadian government. Under the rules for the inquiry, the decision to release the remaining portions of the final report were to be decided within the Canadian courts. In July 2007, the Federal Court ruled that portions of the previously removed text could be released.

=== Canadian government apology and settlement ===
On January 26, 2007, after months of negotiations between the Canadian government and Arar's Canadian legal counsel, Prime Minister Stephen Harper issued a formal apology to Arar on behalf of the Canadian government, apologizing "for any role Canadian officials may have played in what happened to Mr. Arar, Monia Mazigh and their family in 2002 and 2003" and announced that Arar would receive C$10.5 million settlement for his ordeal and an additional one million for legal costs.

=== RCMP apology ===
On September 28, 2006, RCMP Commissioner Giuliano Zaccardelli issued an apology to Arar and his family during the House of Commons committee on public safety and national security:

Mr. Arar, I wish to take this opportunity to express publicly to you and to your wife and to your children how truly sorry I am for whatever part the actions of the RCMP may have contributed to the terrible injustices that you experienced and the pain that you and your family endured.

Arar thanked Commissioner Zaccardelli for his apology but lamented the lack of concrete disciplinary action against those individuals whose actions led to his detention and subsequent torture. Zaccardelli later resigned as RCMP commissioner because of this case.

=== Aftermath ===
In Canada, Arar's ordeal has raised numerous questions that have yet to be answered. Canadian authorities have been unable to discover who leaked sensitive government documents to O'Neill. Those who were involved in the case in the RCMP have not been reprimanded by the government for their mistakes. In fact, several have received promotions.

As of December 2006, the only person held accountable in Canada has been RCMP Commissioner Giuliano Zaccardelli, who resigned over contradictions in his testimony to the House of Commons Committee on Public Safety and National Security. The contradictions were with respect to what he knew at the time and what he told government ministers.

Several Conservative party members, including Canadian Public Safety Minister Stockwell Day and Canadian Prime Minister Stephen Harper, apparently assumed Arar's guilt, labeling him a terrorist. Other commentators have suggested that the settlement reached by the Harper government was designed to embarrass the Liberals, on whose watch the events took place.

Some commentators, including prominent human rights lawyer Faisal Kutty argued that:

Arar settlement in Canada does not close the book. It only opens a new chapter of a book that is about more than Maher Arar — it is about the erosion of civil and human rights in Canada as a result of the "War on Terror." The Arar saga brought into focus the unintended victims of draconian laws and policies hastily enacted post 9/11 in Canada and south of the border. It also shed light on the potential of religious and racial profiling inherent in such laws and practices. We can only hope that Arar's second wish which was to "make sure this does not happen to any other Canadian citizens in the future," will also come true. For this to happen, however, more people must realize that due process and fundamental rights must be respected at all times and more so during times of real or perceived crisis when society has a tendency to overreact.

== Arar's attempts for legal redress ==
Maher Arar on return to Canada brought lawsuits against Syria, Canada, the United States and Jordan.

=== Syria and Jordan lawsuits ===
Arar attempted to sue both the Syrian government and the Jordanian government in Canadian courts but both cases were dismissed on the basis that the Canadian courts had no jurisdiction.

=== United States lawsuit ===
In January 2004, Arar announced that he would be suing then-Attorney General of the United States John Ashcroft over his treatment.

The Center for Constitutional Rights brought the suit Arar v. Ashcroft against former Attorney General John Ashcroft, FBI Director Robert Mueller, and then-Secretary of Homeland Security Tom Ridge, as well as numerous US immigration officials. It charges the defendants violated Arar's constitutional right to due process; his right to choose a country of removal other than one in which he would be tortured, as guaranteed under the Torture Victims Protection Act; and his rights under international law.

The suit charges that Arar's Fifth Amendment due process rights were violated when he was confined without access to an attorney or the court system, both domestically before being rendered, and while detained by the Syrian government, whose actions were complicit with the US. Additionally, the Attorney General and INS officials who carried out his deportation also likely violated his right to due process by recklessly subjecting him to torture at the hands of a foreign government that they had every reason to believe would carry out abusive interrogation.

Further, Arar filed a claim under the Torture Victims Protection Act, adopted by the United States Congress in 1992, which allows a victim of torture by an individual of a foreign government to bring suit against that actor in a US court. Arar's claim under the act against Ashcroft and the INS directors is based upon their complicity in bringing about the torture he suffered. The case was filed in the United States District Court for the Eastern District of New York.

In the case, Arar is seeking compensatory and punitive damages and a declaration that the actions of the US government were illegal and violated his constitutional, civil, and international human rights.

A year after the case was filed, the US government invoked the rarely used "State Secrets Privilege" in a motion to dismiss the suit. The government claimed that to go forward in an open court would jeopardize the United States' intelligence, foreign policy, and national security interests. Specifically, the government's invocation of the state secrets privilege asserted that disclosure of "the basis for the rejection of plaintiff's designation of Canada as the country to which plaintiff wished to be removed," "the basis for the decision to exclude plaintiff from this country," and "the considerations involved in the decision to remove him to Syria" would damage national security interests.

On February 16, 2006, Brooklyn District Court Judge David Trager dismissed Arar's lawsuit against members of the George W. Bush administration, basing his decision on national security grounds.

Center for Constitutional Rights attorneys appealed the case to the Second Circuit Court of Appeals which subsequently upheld the dismissal.

On August 13, 2008, reports appeared in the press that the US Court of Appeals Second Circuit had agreed to rehear the case, en banc. On December 9, 2008, oral arguments were heard by the entire twelve member appeals court. In a 7-4 decision dated November 2, 2009, the 2nd Circuit United States Court of Appeals upheld the ruling by the district court. In dismissing Arar's claim, Chief Judge Dennis Jacobs wrote "Our ruling does not preclude judicial review and oversight in this context. But if a civil remedy in damages is to be created for harms suffered in the context of extraordinary rendition, it must be created by Congress, which alone has the institutional competence to set parameters, delineate safe harbors, and specify relief. If Congress chooses to legislate on this subject, then judicial review of such legislation would be available." Following the court's decision Arar made the following statement,

After seven years of pain and hard struggle it was my hope that the court system would listen to my plea and act as an independent body from the executive branch. Unfortunately, this recent decision and decisions taken on other similar cases, prove that the court system in the United States has become more or less a tool that the executive branch can easily manipulate through unfounded allegations and fear mongering. If anything, this decision is a loss to all Americans and to the rule of law.

The Center for Constitutional Rights, who represented Maher Arar, petitioned the US Supreme Court on February 1, 2010, to hear the Arar case but the Court declined.

== US government response ==
Throughout the Bush administration's term, it continued to maintain that Arar's rendition to Syria was legal and well within its rights. The government has not publicly acknowledged that Arar was tortured in Syria.

=== Former US Attorney General Gonzales's response to the Arar inquiry ===
On September 19, 2006, then-US Attorney General Alberto Gonzales denied any wrongdoing on the part of the US in Arar's rendition to Syria. During a press conference Gonzales said:

Well, we were not responsible for his removal to Syria, I'm not aware that he was tortured, and I haven't read the Commission report. Mr. Arar was deported under our immigration laws. He was initially detained because his name appeared on terrorist lists, and he was deported according to our laws. Some people have characterized his removal as a rendition. That is not what happened here. It was a deportation. And even if it were a rendition, we understand as a government what our obligations are with respect to anyone who is rendered by this government to another country, and that is that we seek to satisfy ourselves that they will not be tortured. And we do that in every case. And if in fact he had been rendered to Syria, we would have sought those same kind of assurances, as we do in every case.

On September 20, 2006, Charles Miller, a Department of Justice spokesman, said Gonzales had merely been trying to clarify that deportations were no longer the responsibility of the Department of Justice, but were now the responsibility of the Department of Homeland Security.

=== Watchlist issue ===
Despite the inquiry's exoneration of Arar, the United States has also refused to remove Arar from its watchlist. Stockwell Day was invited to look at the evidence in the United States' possession in January 2007. In his opinion, the administration is unjustified in continuing to bar Arar from entering the United States. Reportedly, the United States continues to refuse to remove Arar from the watchlist because of "his personal associations and travel history."

Following Day's efforts to remove Arar from the watchlist, US Ambassador to Canada David Wilkins chided Canada for questioning whom the United States can and cannot allow into their country. Notwithstanding, Prime Minister Stephen Harper has vowed to continue to press the United States on this matter. On January 26, 2007, Harper rebuked Wilkins with respect to the Canadian government's efforts to remove him from the US watch list, stating, "Canada has every right to go to bat for one of its citizens when the government believes a Canadian is being unfairly treated."

On October 20, 2007, The Globe and Mail reported that it had seen classified American documents revealing evidence on which the United States acted: "Maher Arar's denials that he ever went to Afghanistan are contradicted by a man convicted of immigration fraud and a self-confessed mujahedeen instructor who says he spotted him there in the early 1990s. ... " The newspaper stated that the informant, Mohamed Kamal Elzahabi, also faced charges of lying to the Federal Bureau of Investigation, and that "his credibility is very much at issue." It added that, even crediting his description of his acquaintance with Arar, "the encounter appears to have been, at most, fleeting."

=== US congressional hearings and testimony ===
Meanwhile, in the United States, Senator Patrick Leahy, chairman of the Senate Judiciary Committee, threatened to hold extensive hearings into Arar's case. Leahy lambasted the US's removal of Arar to Syria as absurd and outrageous, noting that instead of sending Arar a "couple of hundred miles to Canada and turned over to the Canadian authorities ... he was sent thousands of miles away to Syria." Senator Leahy spoke at length on the matter, calling the case "a black mark" on the United States: "We knew damn well, if he went to Canada, he wouldn't be tortured. He'd be held. He'd be investigated. We also knew damn well, if he went to Syria, he'd be tortured. And it's beneath the dignity of this country, a country that has always been a beacon of human rights, to send somebody to another country to be tortured."

Former Attorney General Alberto Gonzales noted that the United States had assurances from Syria that Arar would not be tortured. This was dismissed by Leahy, remarking that the United States got "assurances from a country that we also say, now, we can't talk to them because we can't take their word for anything?" The senator was alluding to the Bush administration's policy of refraining from talking to Iran and Syria. Syria is on the US State Department's list of states that sponsor terrorism.

On October 18, 2007, Arar spoke via video-link before the House Foreign Affairs Subcommittee on International Organizations, Human Rights and Oversight, and the House Judiciary Subcommittee on the Constitution, Civil Rights and Civil Liberties at a hearing that is examining his case and the practice of rendition. In his statement to the committee, he detailed his experiences and expressed his hope that his case will not be repeated. "I now understand how fragile our human rights and freedoms are, and how easily they can be taken from us by the very same governments and institutions that have sworn to protect us. I also know that the only way I will ever be able to move on in my life and have a future is if I can find out why this happened to me, and help prevent it from happening to others."

Members of Congress took the opportunity to personally apologize to Arar. Bill Delahunt, a Massachusetts Democrat, commented on the United States government's inaction, saying, "Let me personally give you what our government has not: an apology." "Let me apologize to you and the Canadian people," he continued, "for our government's role in a mistake."

Dana Rohrabacher, a California Republican, agreed that lawmakers "should be ashamed" of the case, but defended the practice of rendition, claiming that it has "protected the lives of hundreds of thousands if not millions of American lives." Michigan Democrat John Conyers took the opportunity to challenge rendition, and stated that his "intention" is "for high level administration officials responsible for the Arar decision to come before these panels and tell the American people the truth about what happened." "This government is sending people to other countries to be tortured," Conyers said.

On October 24, 2007, US Secretary of State Condoleezza Rice, while testifying in Washington before the House of Representatives foreign affairs committee, admitted that the US communication with the Canadian government was not handled properly. "We have told the Canadian government we do not think this was handled particularly well in terms of our own relationship and we will try to do better in the future," Rice said while testifying before the House of Representatives foreign affairs committee.

On June 5, 2008, a joint hearing entitled "U.S. Department of Homeland Security Inspector General Report OIG-08-18: The Removal of a Canadian Citizen to Syria" was held by the Subcommittee on the Constitution, Civil Rights, and Civil Liberties and the Subcommittee on International Organizations, Human Rights, and Oversight. In his opening remarks DHS Inspector General Skinner noted that his office had reopened their investigation into the Arar case based upon "recently received additional classified information that could be germane to [their] findings"video. A redacted copy of the Department of Homeland Security report was released. A redacted addendum to the initial DHS OIG report was released in March 2010. The follow-up report focused on whether the State Department was involved in the discussions concerning the removal of Maher Arar to Syria. Although no follow-up recommendations were made the follow-up report showed that only a brief courtesy call was made by the Deputy Attorney General to the Deputy Secretary of State with no discussion on assurances that Arar would not be tortured. Also interviewed was the former legal advisor to the Department of State who "told [DHS OIG] that normally his office would have been involved in a similar removal matter. However, he reaffirmed that he was unaware of DOS involvement in Mr. Arar's removal." Further explaining previous reports stating that Arar's removal to Canada would be prejudicial to the United States, the removal decision was made on the "belief that Mr. Arar was a dangerous person and the porous nature of the Canadian/US border will allow Mr. Arar easy access to the United States."

On June 10, 2008, a hearing about diplomatic assurances was held by the Subcommittee on International Organizations, Human Rights, and Oversight.video In his opening statement Representative Bill Delahunt cited the case of Maher Arar and the ambiguousness of assurance received from Syria. It appears that when Arar was removed, the State Department was not consulted when assurances that Arar would not be tortured were obtained. The sole witness was John B. Bellinger III, the legal advisor of the US State Department (previously White House Senior Associate Counsel to the President and Legal Adviser to the National Security Council). Bellinger has previously spoken on the Arar case.

In a letter dated June 10, 2008, US Representatives John Conyers, Jr., Jerrold Nadler, and Bill Delahunt requested of the Attorney General the appointment of a "special counsel to investigate and prosecute any violation of federal criminal laws related to the removal of Canadian citizen, Maher Arar, to Syria." Responding in a letter to Representatives Conyers, Nadler, and Delahunt, Attorney General Michael Mukasey said that he does not believes it warrants a special prosecutor at this time. During the House Committee on the Judiciary oversight hearing Representative Delahunt questioned the Attorney General about his letter and the issue of assurances. When questioned the Attorney General stated that a classified briefing on the assurances from Syria was offered to Representatives Conyers, Nadler, and Delahunt. Representative Delahunt choose not to attend giving the reason of his concern for inadvertently disclosing classified information in public setting. In addition, the Attorney General stated that "sending [Mr. Arar] to Canada could have posed a danger to [the United States]" and sending "him to Syria was safer given those assurances."

=== Dispute over Canadian involvement in his rendition ===
After Arar's release, the controversy continued over his treatment by the US and over the role that Canadian police and government officials may have played in his removal and interrogation. The United States claimed that the RCMP had provided them with a list of suspicious persons that included Arar. It was also discovered that Canadian consular officials knew that Arar was in custody in the United States but did not believe that he would be removed. The Canadian government maintains that the decision to remove Arar to Syria was made by American officials alone.

Canadian officials apparently told US officials Arar was no longer a resident of Canada. The New York Times reported, "In July 2002, the Mounted Police learned that Mr. Arar and his family were in Tunisia, and incorrectly concluded that they had left Canada permanently."

At a summit meeting in Monterrey, Mexico, on January 13, 2004, Canadian Prime Minister Paul Martin and US President George W. Bush reached an agreement, sometimes referred to as the Monterrey Accord, which obliged the United States to notify Canada before deporting a Canadian citizen to a third country. However, according to a news story in the Toronto Globe and Mail, Stephen Yale-Loehr, lawyer and adjunct professor of immigration and asylum law at Cornell University told the Arar inquiry "the Canada-U.S. agreement struck ... to prevent a recurrence of the Arar affair is ineffective and legally unenforceable."

In 2007, as part of the investigation into government foreknowledge, it was revealed that CSIS chief Jack Hooper had sent a memo on October 10, 2002, that included the reference "I think the United States would like to get Arar to Jordan where they can have their way with him," which was the first conclusive evidence that CSIS, and not just the RCMP, knew that a Canadian was going to be tortured at the request of the United States. A year later, Hooper contacted the Department of Foreign Affairs and International Trade to tell them that it was not in Canada's interests to demand that the United States return Maher Arar.

In September 2008, former RCMP commissioner Giuliano Zaccardelli, now with Interpol, said that the White House "threw away the rule book" after 9/11 and that the RCMP was led to believe that Arar would be sent back to Canada from New York. Zaccardelli told the CBC that US authorities said that they didn't have enough evidence to lay charges against Arar and wanted to know whether Arar would be arrested if he returned to Canada. "The discussion was: 'If we let him go and he comes to Canada, can you arrest him or detain him?' And we keep reaffirming, 'No we can't'," Zaccardelli said.

The RCMP set up surveillance team to watch Arar upon his return: "We are waiting in Montreal for the plane to arrive with Mr. Arar getting off the plane. The plane arrives. Mr. Arar never got off." Zaccardelli said.

=== Canada's formal protest to the US government ===
During a telephone conversation on October 6, 2006, Harper notified President Bush that Canada intended to lodge a formal protest over US treatment of Arar. The notification was later followed by a letter of protest sent from Canadian Minister of Foreign Affairs Peter MacKay to US Secretary of State Condoleezza Rice. Harper told reporters that Canada wants "the United States government [to] come clean with its version of events, to acknowledge ... the deficiencies and inappropriate conduct that occurred in this case, particularly vis-à-vis its relationship with the Canadian government." In particular, Canada wants United States' assurances, said Harper, that "these kinds of incidents will not be repeated in the future."

=== US embassy statements ===
Robert H. Tuttle, the US ambassador to Britain told the BBC on December 22, 2005:

I don't think there is any evidence that there have been any renditions carried out in the country of Syria. There is no evidence of that. And I think we have to take what the secretary Condoleezza Rice says at face value. It is something very important, it is done very carefully and she has said we do not authorise, condone torture in any way, shape or form.

This statement was amended the very next day by a US embassy spokeswoman who stated that the embassy

recognised that there had been a media report of a rendition to Syria but reiterated that the United States is not in a position to comment on specific allegations of intelligence activities that appear in the press.

=== Response to the Arar case by President Obama's administration ===
Little was said publicly about Maher Arar by President Obama's administration. In an interview with Neil Macdonald of CBC, US Homeland Security Secretary Janet Napolitano stated that it is the opinion of those who have reviewed Arar's case that "his status should not now be changed." When questioned about the validity of Canada's findings in all matters relating to Arar, Secretary Napolitano clarified saying "his status at least for admission to the United States purposes should not be changed." The Obama administration modified the government's standard for using the state secrets claim. It is unknown how the changes will affect Arar's case against the United States in which the government lawyers had invoked the state secrets privilege. The new standard took effect on October 1, 2009.

== Awards and accolades ==
Time magazine chose Arar as Canadian Newsmaker of the Year for 2004. On October 18, 2006, Arar and the Center for Constitutional Rights were honoured with the Institute for Policy Studies Letelier-Moffitt Human Rights Award, in recognition of the struggle to clear his name and draw attention to American abuses of human rights in dealing with terrorist suspects. Arar, along with Sergeant Patrick Tower, was chosen a co-Nation Builder by The Globe and Mail for 2006. In April 2007, Time magazine named Arar to the TIME 100, its annual listing of 100 influential people in the world. Arar's entry, at No. 58 in the Heroes & Pioneers category, was written by US Senator Patrick Leahy and says his case "stands as a sad example of how we have been too willing to sacrifice our core principles to overarching government power in the name of security, when doing so only undermines the principles we stand for and makes us less safe." The US would not allow him entry to attend Time's recognition event.

In 2011, Arar endorsed the Canadian ship to Gaza, part of the Freedom Flotilla II which aims to end the Israeli blockade of the Gaza Strip.

== In print ==
The case of Maher Arar has been referenced in several books. Jimmy Carter, former President of the United States, discusses Arar sympathetically in his bestselling 2005 book Our Endangered Values: America's Moral Crisis (ISBN 978-0-7432-8501-8). Amy Goodman, host of the radio program Democracy Now!, and her brother David Goodman wrote about Arar in their 2006 book, Static (ISBN 978-1-4013-0914-5). Dark Days: The Story of Four Canadians Tortured in the Name of Fighting Terror, by Kerry Pither (ISBN 978-0-670-06853-1), discusses the investigations of Abdullah Almalki, Ahmad El Maati, Muayyed Nureddin, and Maher Arar by Canadian Security forces, and includes a foreword by Maher Arar. Pither lays out how similar the ordeals of each four men are, all imprisoned by Syria, tortured and questioned, and released without charge. The Arar case was also discussed in Jane Mayer's The Dark Side: The Inside Story of How The War on Terror Turned into a War on American Ideals (ISBN 978-0-385-52639-5 in hardcover, ISBN 978-1-921372-50-6 in softcover).

Hope & Despair. My Struggle to Free My Husband, Maher Arar (ISBN 978-0-7710-5758-8), published November 4, 2008, tells of Monia Mazigh's struggle to free her husband Maher Arar.

== In fiction ==
The movie Rendition is loosely based on the story of Arar. The British film Extraordinary Rendition directed by Jim Threapleton was also inspired by Maher Arar. In addition, Arar consulted with the Omar Berdouni who played Zaafir, the main character, who was abducted by a case of CIA extraordinary rendition.

== PRISM magazine ==
In January 2010 Maher Arar began publishing the online magazine PRISM. PRISM is focused on "in-depth coverage and analysis of national security related issues." Listed as a contributor is Gar Pardy, former head of the Canadian Consular Services who testified at the Arar Inquiry.

Arar announced the magazine's closure on January 8, 2013.

== Activism for US accountability ==
Several human rights organizations are directing activism efforts demanding US accountability for its involvement in Arar's rendition and presumed subsequent torture. Amnesty International USA is leading the "I Apologize" campaign. The campaign is aimed at an official US public apology to Arar, compensation for "all economically assessable damage caused by the U.S.'s detention and transfer of [Arar] to face torture in Syria," and "full accountability for the many human rights violations committed by or on behalf of the U.S. government in the name of countering terrorism." The campaign includes an online petition directed at President Obama and members of the US Congress, paper airplane petitions that was delivered to President Obama in 2012, and public events to increase awareness of the case and to collect petition signatures. In July 2011, Human Rights Watch released a report highlighting violations of US and international law committed by Bush administration officials in their counterterrorism efforts, including the rendition of Arar. The report recommends the initiation of a criminal investigation into the US government's detention practices and interrogation methods since September 11, 2001 and the fulfillment of the US obligation under the Convention against Torture to ensure that victims of torture obtain redress. Other organizations that have supported US accountability for Arar's case include the Campaign for Liberty, the Center for Constitutional Rights, September Eleventh Families for Peaceful Tomorrows, the Alliance for Justice, Appeal for Justice, the Bill of Rights Defense Committee, the Center for Justice and Accountability, the Center for Victims of Torture, Human Rights Advocates, the International Justice Network, amongst others.

== Ten years after 9/11 reflections ==
As the tenth anniversary of September 11, 2001 approached, several reflections have talked about the case of Maher Arar. In a Globe and Mail interview, Sonia Verma asked former Office of Homeland Security Secretary Tom Ridge about the relationship between the US Government and Muslims living in America with reference to Maher Arar.

Sonia Verma: What about the relationship between the American government and American Muslims? Of course you're aware of Maher Arar, who said he was tortured in Syria after being deported there by American authorities. Tom Ridge: I'm familiar with his claims. I'm not familiar with how accurate they are. This is a global scourge. It's really a case of first impression for everybody. As secretary of homeland security after 9/11, I dare say America was confronted with a set of challenges it had never seen before and we acted with what we thought was in the best interest for securing America. We also looked back at what we did and made some adjustments. I'll just leave it at that. We can kill bin Laden and eliminate a lot of these other extremists, but that whole belief system is out there. It doesn't take too many people to buy in to it to cause enormous damage.
