= Abdullah Almalki =

Canadian engineer

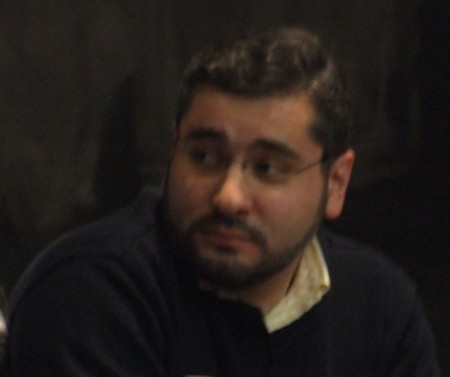
- Almaki after his release
- Born: 1971 (age 54–55); Syria
- Arrested: May 3, 2002; Syria; Syrian Police
- Released: March 2004; Syria
- Detained at: Far' Falastin
- Status: Released
- Occupation: Engineer
- Spouse: Khuzaima
- Parents: 1
- Children: 5

Abdullah Almalki (born 1971) is a Canadian engineer who was imprisoned and tortured for two years in a Syrian jail after Canadian officials falsely indicated to the Syrian authorities and other countries that he was a terrorist threat.

Almalki has since returned to Canada, where he lives with his wife.

In March 2017 the Canadian government issued an official apology to Almalki and his family.

On October 21, 2008, the Commission of Inquiry into The Action Of Canadian Officials in Relation To Abdullah Almalki, Ahmad Abou-Elmaati And Muayyed Nureddin, released its report which cleared Almalki of any wrongdoing and found that the Canadian government was complicit in his torture in Syria. Following this report and its findings, in 2009 the Canadian Parliament passed a motion calling on the Canadian government to issue an apology to Almalki, compensate him, and correct the misinformation that it shared about him and his family nationally and internationally.

== Life ==
Almalki was born in Syria and emigrated to Canada with his parents and three brothers in 1987 at the age of 16. He graduated from Ottawa's Lisgar Collegiate Institute two years later, and the following year received his Canadian citizenship.

He attended Carleton University and obtained his degree in electrical engineering, and was consistently scoring at the top of his class.

== Work in Afghanistan ==
In 1992 Almalki sponsored an Afghan orphan through a Canadian NGO, and decided to travel to the country for three months. The following year, he returned for two months to volunteer with Human Concern International, in projects funded by the United Nations Development Programme.

Upon returning to Canada, Almalki married Kuzaima in October 1993, who was pursuing her PhD in economics. The couple returned to Pakistan to work with HCI. However, the organisation had brought back Ahmed Khadr as their regional director, after he recuperated from an earlier injury, and Almalki found his leadership and workaholic tendencies to be overbearing, and left the organisation in April 1994, earlier than intended.

== Return to Canada ==
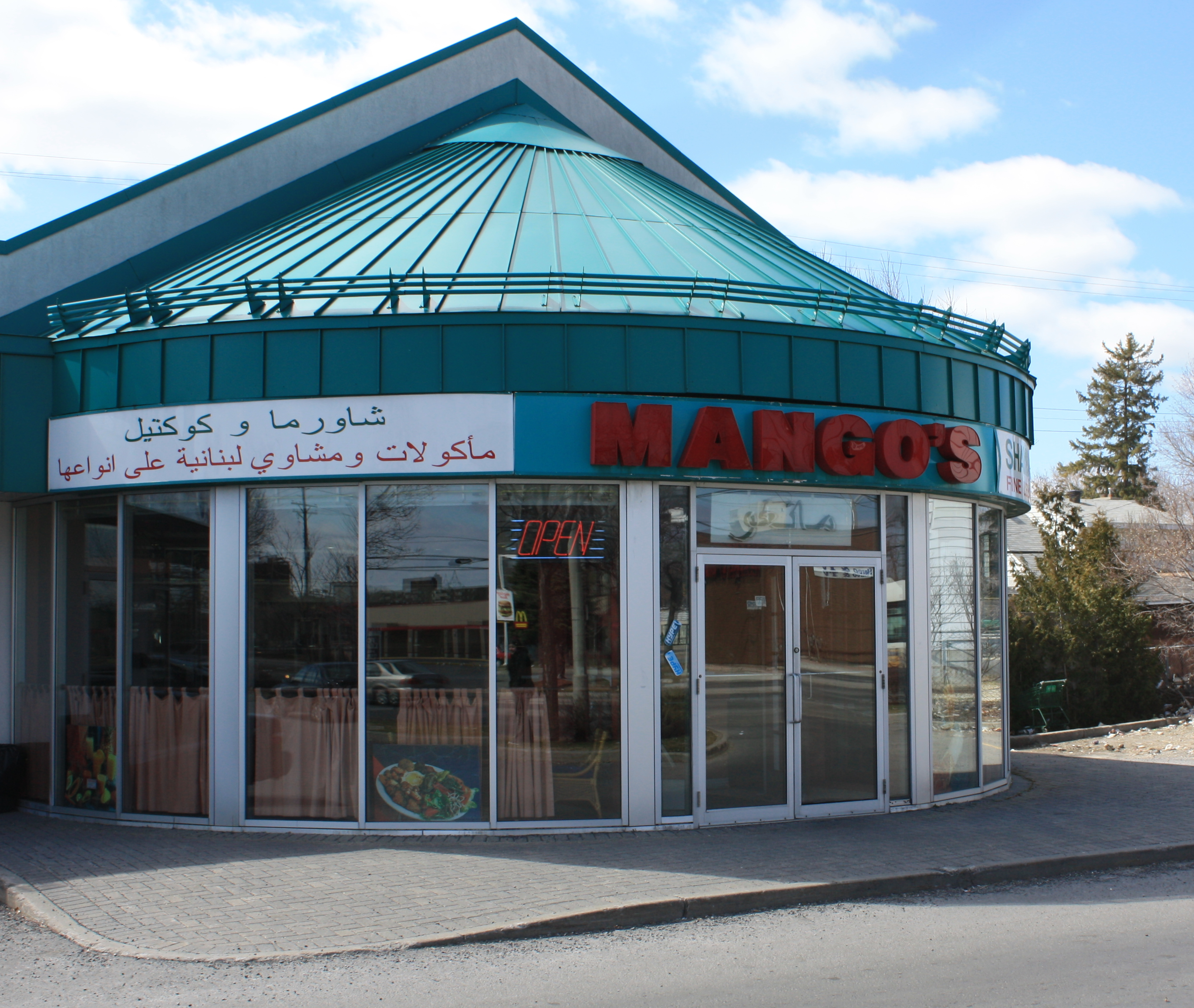
The Mango Cafe in Ottawa

In 1997, Maher Arar listed Almalki as his "emergency contact" with his landlord.

In 1998, when Almalki returned to Canada to open an electronics export business Dawn Services with his wife, he was questioned twice by Canadian Security Intelligence Service agent Theresa Sullivan, who asked him to "speculate" about the possible relations of the HCI regional director (Khadr) with Islamic militants, and whether Almalki had ever sold nuclear material to Pakistan, or walkie-talkies to the Taliban – all of which Almalki said seemed like ridiculous claims.

In 1999 he expanded his business and rented office space in a business park, also he expanded his business into the cellphone market .

In 2000 and again following the September 11, 2001 attacks, CSIS agent Violaine Pepin spoke to him to ask about a Muslim associate with a pilot's license with whom Almalki had flown to Hong Kong in 1999 to sell radios in the final weeks of Y2K.

After Maher Arar had moved back to Ottawa, he had a meeting with Almalki on October 12, 2001. They met at the Mango Café, a popular shawarma restaurant in a strip mall and talked about doctors and bought a print cartridge together. The following month, Almalki flew to Malaysia to visit his mother-in-law.

In January 2002 Almalki was one of seven targets of simultaneous search warrants by Project O Canada. It was found later through court document that these search warrants were obtained by provided a judge false information obtained under torture, and without telling the judge where the information came from.

== Arrest in Syria ==
On May 3, 2002, Almalki arrived in Syria for the first time since he was a child, to visit his ill grandmother. Upon his arrival he was arrested on suspicion of terrorist connections. His arrest was based on information sent to the Syrians by the Canadian government.

During the time Almalki was in a Syrian jail, he was not asked anything related to Syrian interests. Most questions were about his life in Canada. In an interview with the Canadian Broadcasting Corporation shortly after Arar's release from Syria, Arar described encountering Almalki in prison, weak, emaciated and suffering from the effects of torture.

Almalki was released on $125 bail in March 2004 and the Syrian State Supreme Security Court acquitted him of all charges in July 2004. Almalki returned to Canada after the acquittal.

Almalki's case was taken up by many organizations in Canada, including Amnesty International. The Canadian government convened an inquiry into the role Canadian authorities may have had in his case, headed by Frank Iacobucci. The inquiry, concluded in 2008, also included the role of Canadian officials into the cases of Ahmad Abou-Elmaati and Muayyed Nureddin. The Canadian government inquiry into the Arar affair indicated that the Canadian government had sent questions to Syrian military intelligence for use in his interrogation.

According to historian Andy Worthington, author of The Guantanamo Files, Almalki described three of his fellow captives in Syria's Palestinian Branch military prison: Omar Ghramesh, Abu Abdul Halim Dalak and a Syrian teenager who was captured during the same raid where Abu Zubaydah was captured, who Worthington concluded was Noor al-Deen.

On June 18, 2009, the Canadian House of Commons Public Safety Committee voted to urge the Prime Minister to issue an official apology to and to provide compensation to Almalki, el-Maati and Nureddin.

It was reported in July 2017 that three Muslim Canadian men, detained and tortured in the Middle East during the security clampdown that followed 9/11, will get $31.25 million from the federal government. It is not known publicly if Almalki was one of the three.
