= Saddam Hussein and al-Qaeda link allegations =

Conspiracy theory originating from the United States

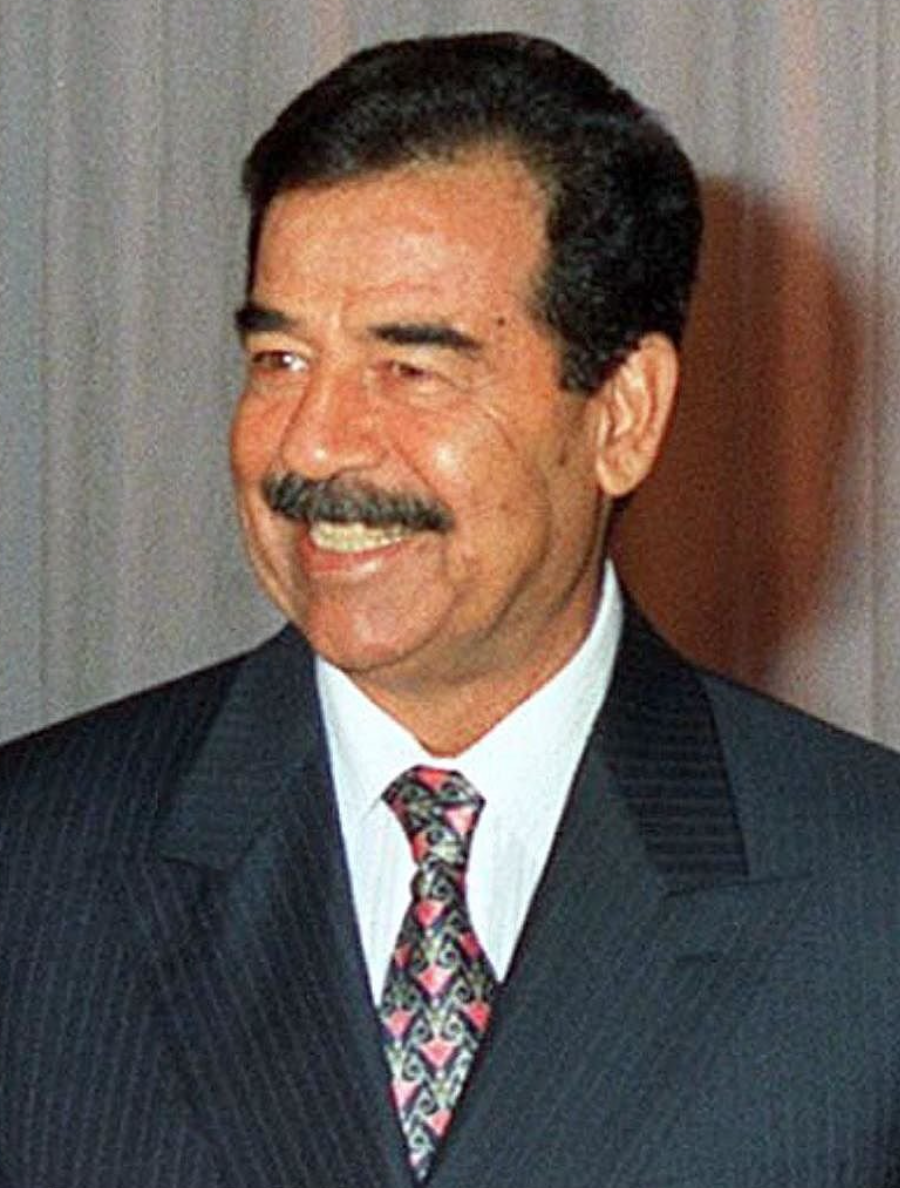
Saddam Hussein, President of Iraq

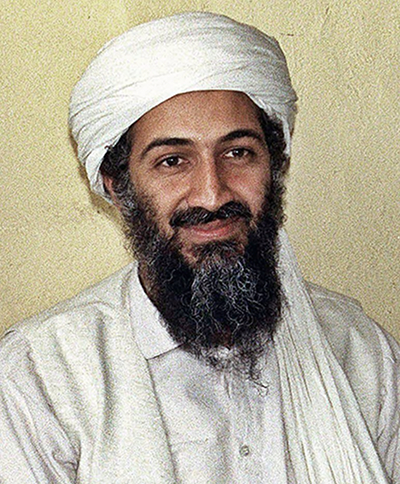
Osama bin Laden, General Emir of al-Qaeda

The Saddam Hussein and al-Qaeda link allegations were based on false claims by the United States federal government alleging that a secretive relationship existed between Iraqi president Saddam Hussein and the pan-Islamist militant organization al-Qaeda between 1992 and 2003. US president George W. Bush used it as a main reason for invading Iraq in 2003.

The conspiracy theory dates to after the Gulf War in 1991, when Iraqi Intelligence Service officers met al-Qaeda members in 1992. After the September 11 attacks in 2001, the conspiracy theory gained worldwide attention. The consensus of intelligence experts, backed up by reports from the 9/11 Commission, United States Senate Select Committee on Intelligence, and declassified United States Department of Defense reports, was that these contacts never led to a relationship between Saddam Hussein and al-Qaeda. Critics of Bush have said that he was intentionally building a case for war with Iraq with no regard for factual evidence.

== Background ==
During the lead-up to the Iraq War, questions were raised about a possible connection between Saddam Hussein's government and al-Qaeda and whether the Iraqi regime and al-Qaeda had a cooperative relationship.

Although some contacts between agents of Saddam's government and members of al-Qaeda have been alleged, the consensus of experts and analysts is that those contacts never led to a formal relationship. The Senate Select Committee on Intelligence concluded that there was only one encounter between representatives of the Baathist regime and representatives of al-Qaeda. This meeting took place in Sudan in 1995, and the Iraqi representative (who is in custody and has been cooperating with investigators) said that after the meeting he "received word from his IIS chain-of-command that he should not see bin Laden again." The panel found evidence of only two other instances in which there was any communication between Saddam's regime and al-Qaeda members. On the other two occasions, the Committee concluded, Saddam rebuffed meeting requests from an al-Qaeda operative. The intelligence community has not found other evidence of meetings between al-Qaeda and Iraq.

On the more specific question of whether Saddam was behind the September 11 attacks, the consensus is that there is no credible evidence of his government's involvement. The US intelligence community (CIA, NSA, and DIA) view, confirmed by the conclusions of the 9/11 Commission Report and the Senate Report on Iraqi WMD Intelligence, is that there was no cooperative effort between the two and Saddam did not support the 9/11 attacks; it was considered that the difference in ideology between Saddam and al-Qaeda made cooperation in any terrorist attacks unlikely. The Senate report discussed the possibility of Saddam offering al-Qaeda training and safe haven, but confirmed the CIA's conclusion that there was no evidence of operational cooperation between the two. By March 20, 2006, President George W. Bush made clear that his administration did not have evidence to prove that Saddam played a role in the attacks.

== History of claims ==
=== After the September 11 attacks ===
The Bush administration sought to link the Iraqi president to Islamist radicals early in the aftermath of the September 11 attacks. President Bush allegedly made the case to Tony Blair as early as September 14, 2001, although Blair urged him not to pursue the claim.

=== Dick Cheney's allegations ===
Vice President Dick Cheney said during a Meet the Press appearance on December 9, 2001, that Iraq was harboring Abdul Rahman Yasin, a suspect in the 1993 World Trade Center bombing. Cheney repeated the claim in another appearance on September 14, 2003:

We learned more and more that there was a relationship between Iraq and al-Qaida that stretched back through most of the decade of the '90s, that it involved training, for example, on BW and CW, that al-Qaida sent personnel to Baghdad to get trained on the systems that are involved. The Iraqis providing bomb-making expertise and advice to the al-Qaida organization. We know, for example, in connection with the original World Trade Center bombing in '93 that one of the bombers was Iraqi, returned to Iraq after the attack of '93. And we've learned subsequent to that, since we went into Baghdad and got into the intelligence files, that this individual probably also received financing from the Iraqi government as well as safe haven.

Cheney said in a January 2004 interview with National Public Radio there was "overwhelming evidence" of a relationship between Saddam and al-Qaeda based on purported evidence, including Iraq's alleged harboring of Yasin.

In the 2001 and 2003 Meet the Press interviews, Cheney also reported that Czech Interior Minister Stanislav Gross said that an Iraqi intelligence officer met with 9/11 hijacker Mohamed Atta in Prague five months before the attacks; in the 2003 interview, he said that "we've never been able to develop any more of that yet either in terms of confirming it or discrediting it. We just don't know." In 2006, Cheney acknowledged that the notion "that the meeting ever took place" had been "pretty well knocked down now."

=== Intelligence community claims and doubts ===
In the initial stages of the war on terror, the Central Intelligence Agency under George Tenet was rising to prominence as the lead agency in the Afghan war. When Tenet insisted in his personal meetings with President Bush that there was no connection between al-Qaeda and Iraq, however, Dick Cheney and Secretary of Defense Donald Rumsfeld initiated a secret program to re-examine the evidence and marginalize the CIA and Tenet. Believing that a state was involved, they questioned whether the CIA were competent enough to produce accurate information as the agency underestimated threats and failed to accurately predict events such as the Iranian Revolution, the Iraqi Invasion of Kuwait, and the collapse of the Soviet Union. They instead preferred outside analysis, of which intelligence and analysis was supplied by the Iraqi National Congress headed by Iraqi exile Ahmed Chalabi, as well as unvetted pieces of intelligence. The questionable intelligence acquired by this secret program was then "stovepiped" to the vice president and presented to the public. Cheney's office would sometimes leak the intelligence to reporters, where it would be reported by outlets such as The New York Times. Cheney would subsequently appear on the Sunday political television talk shows to discuss the intelligence, citing the Times to give it credence.

The prewar CIA testimony was that there was evidence of senior-level contacts between Iraq and al-Qaeda going back a decade, with Iraq providing al-Qaeda training (combat, bomb-making, and CBRN:chemical, biological, radiological and nuclear), but they had no credible information that Baghdad had foreknowledge of the September 11 attacks or any other al-Qaeda strike. The CIA's report on Iraq's ties to terrorism noted in September 2002 that the CIA did not have "credible intelligence reporting" of operational collaboration between Iraq and al-Qaeda. According to the Senate Select Committee on Intelligence, the CIA reported that "al-Qaida, including Bin Ladin personally, and Saddam were leery of close cooperation," but the "mutual antipathy of the two would not prevent tactical, limited cooperation." (p. 338) The current expert consensus is that although members of Saddam's intelligence service may have met with al-Qaeda terrorists over the last decade or so, there was no evidence that Iraq and al-Qaeda were linked operationally. It is now known that the main source for the CIA's claim that Iraq had trained al-Qaeda members in bomb-making, poisons and gases included the now-recanted claims of captured al-Qaeda leader Ibn al-Shaykh al-Libi. The CIA has since recalled and reissued its intelligence reporting about al-Libi's recanted claims. The DIA communicated to President Bush in February 2002 its stance that al-Libi "was intentionally misleading his debriefers."

=== 9/11 Commission conclusions ===
In its report, the 9/11 Commission said that Osama bin Laden sponsored anti-Saddam Islamists in Iraqi Kurdistan and sought to attract them to his Islamic army. Those forces primarily operated in areas not under Saddam's control. To protect his ties with Iraq, Sudanese Islamic leader Hassan al-Turabi brokered an agreement with bin Laden to stop supporting activities against Saddam. Bin Laden seemed to honor this agreement for a time, although he continued to aid Islamic extremists in Kurdistan. During the late 1990s, these extremist groups were defeated by Kurdish forces. In 2001, the extremist groups (with help from Bin Laden) re-formed as Ansar al-Islam. Indications exist that by then, the Iraqi regime tolerated (and may have helped) Ansar al-Islam against their common Kurdish enemy.

The commission concluded that "to date [2004] we have seen no evidence that these or the earlier contacts ever developed into a collaborative operational relationship," however, and did not find proof "indicating that Iraq cooperated with al-Qaeda in developing or carrying out any attacks against the United States." This conclusion is consistent with the findings of investigations of specific aspects of the Saddam Hussein-al-Qaeda relationship, including those conducted by the Central Intelligence Agency, Defense Intelligence Agency, Federal Bureau of Investigation, and National Security Council. The Senate Report on Iraqi WMD Intelligence also reviewed the intelligence community's conclusions, and found them justifiable.

=== Operation Iraqi Freedom documents ===
The U.S. government released "Operation Iraqi Freedom documents", about which the Pentagon said that it had made "no determination regarding the authenticity of the documents, validity or factual accuracy." Claims have been made that information in some of the documents suggests that Saddam and al-Qaeda may have been willing to work together. 9/11 Commission member Bob Kerrey looked at some of the documents and "was careful to say that new documents translated last night by ABC News did not prove Saddam Hussein played a role in any way in plotting the attacks of September 11, 2001." However, Kerrey said that one document suggests that "Saddam was a significant enemy of the United States."

The Office of the Director of National Intelligence looked at the documents and said that "amateur translators won't find any major surprises, such as proof Hussein hid stockpiles of chemical weapons." The Pentagon also examined the documents and released an official study which did not report on any evidence linking Saddam to al-Qaeda. The 2006 Senate Select Committee on Intelligence concluded that "additional reviews of documents recovered in Iraq are unlikely to provide information that would contradict the Committee's findings or conclusions." Intelligence expert Steven Aftergood said that the release of the documents was being used as an opportunity to find "a retrospective justification for the war in Iraq."

=== Bush administration retraction ===
On March 21, 2006, Bush sought to distance himself from the allegation of any link: "First, just if I might correct a misperception, I don't think we ever said—at least I know I didn't say that there was a direct connection between September the 11th and Saddam Hussein." Bush reaffirmed the White House position in stronger terms in a press conference on August 21 of that year. Ken Herman of Cox News asked, "What did Iraq have to do with ... the attack on the World Trade Center?" Bush replied, "Nothing", and added: "Nobody has ever suggested that the attacks of September the 11th were ordered by Iraq."

Opponents of Bush's Iraq policy called his statement inconsistent with his letter to Congress of March 21, 2003. A minority (Democratic) staff report by the U.S. House of Representatives Committee on Government Reform said that "in 125 separate appearances, they [Bush, Cheney, Powell, Rumsfeld and Rice] made ... 61 misleading statements about Iraq's relationship with al-Qaeda."

=== American public opinion ===
Polls have indicated that many Americans continued to believe that Saddam was linked to al-Qaeda, although the number who do so has slowly declined. The discrepancy has been attributed to the way the U.S. mainstream media presented facts and opinion about the war on terror.

== Skepticism ==
=== Conflicting goals and ideologies ===
Saddam Hussein was a Ba'athist, and Ba'athism combines pan-Arab nationalism with Arab socialism. The ideological founder of Ba'athism, Michel Aflaq, was a Christian. The movement is at odds with political Islam, with which Saddam had been in conflict; Saddam exiled Ayatollah Khomeini to France when the ayatollah attempted to incite the Iraqi Shia to overthrow him when Khomeini was in exile in Najaf, which was a catalyst for the Iranian Revolution and the resulting Iran-Iraq war. Khomeini pitted Saddam against Islamic radicalism; Saddam's people were inspired by the Iranian Revolution and eight years of "holy war" against Iranians who used suicide tactics. This wreaked havoc on the Iraqi armed forces, who solved the problem with chemical weapons.

During the Lebanese Civil War, Saddam supported Michel Aoun and the Christian Maronites instead of the Amal Movement, who were supported by Iraq's ideological rivals in Ba'athist Syria, or Hezbollah, who were funded by Iran. When Iraq invaded Kuwait in August 1990, Osama bin Laden offered to defend Saudi Arabia by sending mujahideen from Afghanistan to repel Saddam's forces. After the Gulf War, bin Laden continued to criticize Saddam's Ba'ath administration and emphasized that Saddam could not be trusted. Bin Laden told his biographer that "the land of the Arab world, the land is like a mother, and Saddam Hussein is fucking his mother." Saddam abolished sharia courts in Iraq, cracked down on Islamist movements (responding with mass executions and torture when he felt threatened by them), promoted Western ideals of society and law, and usually retained secular Sunnis, Shias and Christians in his government.

Robert Pape's study of suicide terrorism found that "al-Qaeda's transnational suicide terrorists have come overwhelmingly from America's closest allies in the Muslim world and not at all from the Muslim regimes that the U.S. State Department considers 'state sponsors of terrorism'." Pape notes that no al-Qaeda suicide attackers came from Iraq. Daniel Byman's study of state sponsorship of terrorism also did not list Iraq as a significant state sponsor and called the al-Qaeda connection "a rationale that before the war was strained and after it seems an ever-weaker reed." Counterterrorism experts Rohan Gunaratna, Bruce Hoffman and Daniel Benjamin and journalists Peter Bergen and Jason Burke (both of whom have written extensively about al-Qaeda) have found no evidence of a collaborative relationship between Saddam Hussein and al-Qaeda. This conclusion agrees with investigations by the National Security Council, the Central Intelligence Agency, Federal Bureau of Investigation, and the 9/11 Commission. The Senate Select Committee on Intelligence reviewed the CIA investigation, and found that the agency's conclusion that there was no evidence of operational collaboration was justified.

Although Saddam was not involved in the September 11 attacks, members of his government had contacts with al-Qaeda; however, the links are not considered by experts and analysts as convincing evidence of a collaborative, operational relationship. Former counterterrorism czar Richard A. Clarke writes,

The simple fact is that lots of people, particularly in the Middle East, pass along many rumors and they end up being recorded and filed by U.S. intelligence agencies in raw reports. That does not make them "intelligence". Intelligence involves analysis of raw reports, not merely their enumeration or weighing them by the pound. Analysis, in turn, involves finding independent means of corroborating the reports. Did al-Qaeda agents ever talk to Iraqi agents? I would be startled if they had not. I would also be startled if American, Israeli, Iranian, British, or Jordanian agents had somehow failed to talk to al-Qaeda or Iraqi agents. Talking to each other is what intelligence agents do, often under assumed identities or "false flags", looking for information or possible defectors.

Larry Wilkerson, former chief of staff for Secretary of State Colin Powell, told the Voice of America that

... Saddam Hussein had his agenda and al-Qaida had its agenda, and those two agendas were incompatible. And so if there was any contact between them, it was a contact that was rebuffed rather than a contact that led to meaningful relationships between them.

=== Lack of evidence ===
An alleged meeting in Prague between Mohammed Atta and an Iraqi intelligence officer about which Vice President Cheney said that "we've never been able to develop any more of that yet either in terms of confirming it or discrediting it" was dismissed by CIA Director George Tenet, who told the Senate Intelligence Committee in February 2004 that there was no evidence to support the meeting. The FBI had evidence that Atta was in Florida at the time and taking aircraft flight training; the Iraqi officer in question, Ahmed Khalil Ibrahim Samir al Ani, was captured and said that he had never met Atta.

Cheney's repeated accusation that Iraq harbored Abdul Rahman Yasin, one of the perpetrators of the 1993 World Trade Center bombing, conflicts with Iraq's 1998 offer to the FBI of extradition for Yasin in return for a statement clearing Iraq of any responsibility for the attack. Although the CIA and FBI had concluded that Iraq played no role in the attack, the Clinton administration refused the offer. Iraq also offered to extradite Yasin in 2001, after the 9/11 attacks. In June 2002, an unnamed U.S. intelligence official told 60 Minutes that Iraq had attached "extreme conditions" to Yasin's extradition. According to the official, the Iraqis wanted the U.S. to sign a document detailing Yasin's whereabouts since 1993 but the U.S. disagreed with their version of the facts. Yasin cooperated with the FBI and was released, which the bureau later called a "mistake." The CIA and FBI concluded in 1995 and 1996 that "the Iraqi government was in no way involved in the attack", and counterterrorism czar Richard Clarke called the allegations "absolutely without foundation" in 2004. The Iraqis made another offer to the Bush administration in 2003, which was also declined.

Al-Qaeda did not have any relationship with Saddam Hussein or his regime. We had to draw up a plan to enter Iraq through the north that was not under the control of his regime. We would then spread south to the areas of our fraternal Sunni brothers. The fraternal brothers of the Ansar al-Islam expressed their willingness to offer assistance to help us achieve this goal.

— Saif al-Adel

Former National Security Council counterterrorism directors Daniel Benjamin and Steven Simon summarized the problem with the Bush administration's view in the eyes of the intelligence community: "The administration pressed its case for war most emphatically by arguing that U.S. national security was imperiled by Saddam's ties to al-Qaeda. The argument had the obvious virtue of playing to the public's desire to see the war on terrorism prosecuted aggressively and conclusively. Yet, scant proof of these links was presented. The record showed a small number of contacts between jihadists and Iraqi officials. This was treated as the tip of an unseen iceberg of cooperation, even though it fell far short of anything that resembled significant cooperation in the eyes of the counterterrorism community—as it always had. No persuasive proof was given of money, weaponry, or training being provided." Former Chief of Staff to Secretary of State Colin Powell Lawrence B. Wilkerson said, "[A]s the administration authorized harsh interrogation in April and May 2002—well before the Justice Department had rendered any legal opinion—its principal priority for intelligence was not aimed at pre-empting another terrorist attack on the U.S. but discovering a smoking gun linking Iraq and al-Qa'ida."

== Background ==
Saddam invoked religion shortly before the 1990 Iraqi invasion of Kuwait (possibly to bolster his government), adding the words "God is Great" in Arabic to the flag and referring to God in his speeches. He began the Faith Campaign in 1994, which included the construction and repair of mosques, the closure of night clubs, and changes to the law which restricted alcohol consumption.

Some sources allege that several meetings between top Iraqi operatives and bin Laden took place. These claims have been disputed by other sources, including most of the original intelligence agencies that investigated the allegations. Many in the intelligence community are skeptical about whether such meetings, if they took place at all, resulted in any meaningful relationship. Many of the claims of collaboration seem to have originated with associates of the Iraqi National Congress, whose credibility has been questioned and who have been accused of manipulating evidence to lure the United States into war on false pretenses. Raw intelligence reports also reached public awareness through the leaking of a memo from Undersecretary of Defense for Policy Douglas J. Feith to the Senate Select Committee on Intelligence, the conclusions of which have been disputed by intelligence agencies which include the CIA. Feith's view of the relationship between Saddam and Osama differed from the official view of the intelligence community, and the memo was leaked to the media. The Pentagon issued a statement that the memo was "a classified annex containing a list and description of the requested reports, so that the committee could obtain the reports from the relevant members of the intelligence community ... The classified annex was not an analysis of the substantive issue of the relationship between Iraq and al Qaeda, and it drew no conclusions." It added, "Individuals who leak or purport to leak classified information are doing serious harm to national security; such activity is deplorable and may be illegal." Former DIA Middle East section head W. Patrick Lang told the Washington Post that the Weekly Standard article, which published Feith's memo, "is a listing of a mass of unconfirmed reports, many of which themselves indicate that the two groups continued to try to establish some sort of relationship. If they had such a productive relationship, why did they have to keep trying?" According to the Post, "another former senior intelligence official said the memo is not an intelligence product but rather 'data points ... among the millions of holdings of the intelligence agencies, many of which are simply not thought likely to be true.'"

It has been suggested that an understanding was reached between Iraq and al-Qaeda that al-Qaeda would not act against Saddam in exchange for Iraqi support (primarily in the form of training), but no evidence of such an understanding has been produced. Mohamed Atta allegedly met with an Iraqi intelligence operative in Prague, but intelligence officials have concluded that no such meeting took place. A training camp in Salman Pak (south of Baghdad) was said by a number of defectors to have been used to train international terrorists (assumed to be al-Qaeda members) in hijacking techniques, using a real airplane as a prop. The defectors were inconsistent about a number of details; the camp has been examined by U.S. Marines, and intelligence analysts do not believe that it was used by al-Qaeda. Some analysts believe that it was used for counterterrorism training, and others believe it was used to train foreign fighters overtly allied with Iraq. The Senate Select Committee on Intelligence concluded, "Postwar findings support the April 2002 Defense Intelligence Agency (DIA) assessment that there was no credible reporting on al-Qa'ida training at Salman Pak or anywhere else in Iraq. There have been no credible reports since the war that Iraq trained al-Qa'ida operatives at Salman Pak to conduct or support transnational terrorist operations."

In November 2001, a month after the September 11 attacks, Mubarak al-Duri was contacted by Sudanese intelligence services who told him that the FBI had sent Jack Cloonan and several other agents to speak with a number of people known to have ties to bin Laden. Al-Duri and another Iraqi colleague agreed to meet with Cloonan in a safe house overseen by the intelligence service. They laughed when asked about any connection between Saddam Hussein and al-Qaeda, saying that bin Laden hated the dictator whom he considered a "Scotch-drinking, woman-chasing apostate."

== Timeline ==
Much evidence of alleged links between Iraq and al-Qaeda is based on speculation about meetings which might have taken place between Iraqi officials and al-Qaeda members; the idea that a meeting could have occurred has been interpreted as evidence of collaboration. According to terrorism analyst Evan Kohlman, "While there have been a number of promising intelligence leads hinting at possible meetings between al-Qaeda members and elements of the former Baghdad regime, nothing has been yet shown demonstrating that these potential contacts were historically any more significant than the same level of communication maintained between Osama bin Laden and ruling elements in a number of Iraq's Persian Gulf neighbors, including Saudi Arabia, Iran, Yemen, Qatar, and Kuwait."

== Colin Powell's address to the U.N. Security Council ==
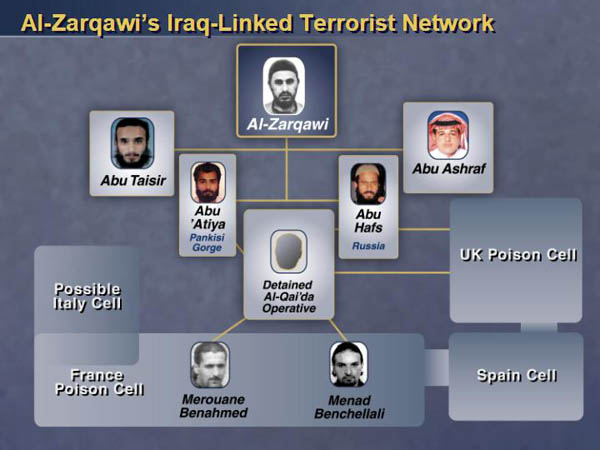
Colin Powell's U.N. slide of Al-Zarqawi's alleged global terrorist network. The "detained Al-Qaeda Operative" is widely believed to be Ibn al-Shaykh al-Libi. The "UK Poison Cell" was found in court to be a single person.

On February 5, 2003, Secretary of State Colin Powell addressed the U.N. Security Council on the issue of Iraq. In his speech, Powell made several claims about Iraq's ties to terrorism. He acknowledged in January 2004 that the speech presented no hard evidence of collaboration between Saddam and al-Qaeda, and told reporters at a State Department press conference that "I have not seen smoking gun, concrete evidence about the connection, but I do believe the connections existed." After Powell left office, he acknowledged that he was skeptical about the evidence presented to him for the speech. He told Barbara Walters in an interview that he considered the speech a "blot" on his record, and feels "terrible" about assertions he made in the speech which turned out to be false: "There were some people in the intelligence community who knew at that time that some of these sources were not good, and shouldn't be relied upon, and they didn't speak up. That devastated me." Asked about a Saddam-al-Qaeda connection, Powell answered: "I have never seen a connection ... I can't think otherwise because I'd never seen evidence to suggest there was one."

The main claims in Powell's speech—that Jordanian terrorist Abu Musab al-Zarqawi was a link between Saddam Hussein and al-Qaeda, and that Saddam's government provided training and assistance to al-Qaeda terrorists in Baghdad—have been disputed by the intelligence community and terrorism experts. The CIA released an August 2004 report which concluded that there was "no conclusive evidence that the regime harbored Osama bin Laden associate Abu Musab Al-Zarqawi." A U.S. official told Reuters that "the report did not make any final judgments or come to any definitive conclusions: "To suggest the case is closed on this would not be correct." Zarqawi reportedly entered Iraq from Iran, infiltrating the Kurdish north because it was the one part of the country not under Saddam's control. Intelligence experts say that Zarqawi had few ties to Osama bin Laden, noting that he was a rival (not an affiliate) of al-Qaeda. A former Israeli intelligence official described the meeting between Zarqawi and bin Laden as "loathing at first sight." The other major claims in the speech are attributed by Powell to "an al-Qaeda source." Karen DeYoung wrote, "A year after the invasion, the [CIA] acknowledged that the information had come from a single source who had been branded a liar by U.S. intelligence officials long before Powell's presentation." The source was captured al-Qaeda leader Ibn al-Shaykh al-Libi, who was handed over to Egypt for interrogation. According to The New York Times, al-Libi provided some accurate intelligence on al Qaeda and made some statements about Iraq and al Qaeda while in American custody; after he was handed over to Egypt, he made more-specific assertions about Iraq training al-Qaeda members in biological- and chemical-weapons use. A February 2002 DIA report expressed skepticism about al-Libi's claims, noting that he may have been subjected to harsh treatment in Egyptian custody. In February 2004, the CIA reissued al-Libi's debriefing reports to note that he had recanted information. A government official told the New York Times that al-Libi's claims of harsh treatment had not been corroborated; the CIA has refused to comment on al-Libi's case since much of its information remains classified, but current and former government officials agreed to discuss the case on condition of anonymity. Two U.S. counterterrorism officials told Newsweek that they believed the information Powell cited about al-Iraqi came from al-Libi. A CIA officer told the United States Senate Select Committee on Intelligence that although the CIA believes al-Libi fabricated information, the agency could not determine whether – or what portions of – the original statements or later recantations are true of false. The Senate report concluded, "The Intelligence Community has found no postwar information to indicate that Iraq provided CBW training to al-Qa'ida."

== Investigations and reports ==
Several investigations by U.S. intelligence agencies, foreign intelligence agencies, and independent investigative bodies have examined aspects of alleged links between Saddam Hussein and al-Qaeda. Every investigation has concluded that the data examined did not provide compelling evidence of a cooperative relationship between the two entities. On April 29, 2007, former Director of Central Intelligence George Tenet said on 60 Minutes, "We could never verify that there was any Iraqi authority, direction and control, complicity with al-Qaeda for 9/11 or any operational act against America, period."

=== 1993 WTC investigations ===
After the 1993 World Trade Center bombing, there were several investigations of possible collaboration between Saddam Hussein and the terrorists who attacked the building. (Note: This investigation related to Abdul Rahman Yasin. The Iraqis had made a similar offer to the Bush administration in 2003, but that offer was also spurned.) Neil Herman, who headed the FBI investigation of the attack, noted that there was no evidence of Iraqi support for the attack despite Yasin's presence in Baghdad. "We looked at that rather extensively," he told CNN terrorism expert Peter Bergen. "There were no ties to the Iraqi government." Bergen wrote, "In sum, by the mid-'90s, the Joint Terrorism Task Force in New York, the F.B.I., the U.S. Attorney's office in the Southern District of New York, the C.I.A., the N.S.C., and the State Department had all found no evidence implicating the Iraqi government in the first Trade Center attack."

=== 1998 National Security Council exercise ===
Daniel Benjamin, who headed the United States National Security Council's counterterrorism division, led a 1998 exercise to analyze the CIA's contention that Iraq and al-Qaeda would not collaborate. "This was a red-team effort," Benjamin said. "We looked at this as an opportunity to disprove the conventional wisdom, and basically we came to the conclusion that the CIA had this one right." He later told The Boston Globe, "No one disputes that there have been contacts over the years. In that part of the America-hating universe, contacts happen. But that's still a long way from suggesting that they were really working together."

=== 2001 President's Daily Brief ===
Ten days after the September 11 attacks, President Bush received a classified President's Daily Brief (prepared at his request) indicating that the U.S. intelligence community had no evidence linking Saddam Hussein to the attacks and there was "scant credible evidence that Iraq had any significant collaborative ties with Al Qaeda." The PDB wrote off the few contacts that existed between Saddam's government and al-Qaeda as attempts to monitor the group, not work with it. According to National Journal, "Much of the contents of the PDB were later incorporated, albeit in a slightly different form, into a lengthier CIA analysis examining not only Al Qaeda's contacts with Iraq, but also Iraq's support for international terrorism." This PDB was one of the documents the Bush administration refused to turn over to the Senate Report of Pre-war Intelligence on Iraq, even on a classified basis, and refused to discuss other than acknowledging its existence.

=== 2001-02 Atta in Prague investigations ===
After 9/11 hijacker Mohamed Atta was allegedly seen in Prague in 2001 meeting with an Iraqi diplomat, a number of investigations analyzed the possible meeting. They concluded that all known evidence suggested that such a meeting was unlikely at best. According to the January 2003 CIA report "Iraqi Support for Terrorism", "[T]he most reliable reporting to date casts doubt on this possibility" (a meeting). CIA director George Tenet released "the most complete public assessment by the agency on the issue" in a statement to the Senate Armed Services Committee in July 2004, saying that the agency was "increasingly skeptical" that any such meeting took place. CIA deputy director John McLaughlin described the extent of the agency's investigation into the claim: "Well, on something like the Atta meeting in Prague, we went over that every which way from Sunday. We looked at it from every conceivable angle. We peeled open the source, examined the chain of acquisition. We looked at photographs. We looked at timetables. We looked at who was where and when. It is wrong to say that we didn't look at it. In fact, we looked at it with extraordinary care and intensity and fidelity." A New York Times investigation which included "extensive interviews with leading Czech figures" reported that Czech officials had backed off the claim.

The FBI and the Czech police chief investigated the issue and reached similar conclusions; FBI director Robert Mueller noted that the bureau's investigation "ran down literally hundreds of thousands of leads and checked every record we could get our hands on, from flight reservations to car rentals to bank accounts." The 9/11 Commission investigation, which examined the FBI and Czech intelligence investigations, concluded that "[n]o evidence has been found that Atta was in the Czech Republic in April 2001." The commission still could not "absolutely rule out the possibility" that Atta was in Prague on 9 April under an alias, but concluded: "There was no reason for such a meeting, especially considering the risk it would pose to the operation. By April 2001, all four pilots had completed most of their training, and the muscle hijackers were about to begin entering the United States. The available evidence does not support the original Czech report of an Atta-Ani meeting." (p. 229)

=== 2002 DIA reports ===
In February 2002, The U.S. Defense Intelligence Agency issued Defense Intelligence Terrorism Summary No. 044–02 in February 2002 (the existence of which was revealed on 9 December 2005 by Doug Jehl in the New York Times), which impugned the credibility of information obtained from captured al-Qaeda leader Ibn al-Shaykh al-Libi. The DIA summary suggested that al-Libi had been "intentionally misleading" his interrogators, and cast doubt on the possibility of a Saddam Hussein-al-Qaeda conspiracy: "Saddam's regime is intensely secular and is wary of Islamic revolutionary movements. Moreover, Baghdad is unlikely to provide assistance to a group it cannot control." In April 2002, the DIA said that "there was no credible reporting on al-Qa'ida training at Salman Pak or anywhere else in Iraq".

=== 2002 British intelligence report ===
In October 2002, a British intelligence investigation of possible links between Iraq and al-Qaeda and the possibility of Iraqi WMD attacks issued a report which concluded that "al Qaeda has shown interest in gaining chemical and biological expertise from Iraq, but we do not know whether any such training was provided. We have no intelligence of current cooperation between Iraq and al Qaeda and do not believe that al Qaeda plans to conduct terrorist attacks under Iraqi direction".

=== 2003 CIA report ===
The CIA released Iraqi Support for Terrorism, a report to Congress, in January 2003. The report concluded, "In contrast to the patron-client pattern between Iraq and its Palestinian surrogates, the relationship between Iraq and al-Qaida appears to more closely resemble that of two independent actors trying to exploit each other—their mutual suspicion suborned by al-Qaida's interest in Iraqi assistance, and Baghdad's interest in al-Qaida's anti-U.S. attacks ... The Intelligence Community has no credible information that Baghdad had foreknowledge of the 11 September attacks or any other al-Qaida strike." Michael Scheuer, the main researcher assigned to review research for the report, described the review and his conclusions: "For about four weeks in late 2002 and early 2003, I and several others were engaged full time in searching CIA files—seven days a week, often far more than eight hours a day. At the end of the effort, we had gone back ten years in the files and had reviewed nearly twenty thousand documents that amounted to well over fifty thousand pages of materials ... There was no information that remotely supported the analysis that claimed there was a strong working relationship between Iraq and al Qaeda. I was embarrassed because this reality invalidated the analysis I had presented on the subject in my book." Scheuer said that he was not part of the analysis team that produced "Iraqi Support for Terrorism", but was the main researcher reviewing the evidence and conclusions of that report. According to the SSCI report, "Iraqi Support for Terrorism contained the following summary judgments regarding Iraq's provision of training to al-Qaida: Regarding the Iraq-al-Qa'ida relationship, reporting from sources of varying reliability points to ... incidents of training ... The most disturbing aspect of the relationship is the dozen or so reports of varying reliability mentioning the involvement of Iraq or Iraqi nationals in al-Qa'ida's efforts to obtain CBW training." Although the report questioned information from captured al-Qaeda leader Ibn al-Shaykh al-Libi, Colin Powell cited al-Libi's claims in his speech to the United Nations Security Council in February 2003; the following day, President Bush spoke in the Roosevelt Room at the White House with Powell at his side. National Security Council spokesperson Michele Davis told Newsweek that it was impossible to determine whether dissent from the DIA and questions by the CIA were seen by officials at the White House before the president spoke. A counter-terrorism official told Newsweek that although CIA reports on al-Libi were distributed widely around U.S. intelligence agencies and policy-making offices, many similarly routine reports were not read by senior policy-making officials. Davis added that Bush's remarks were "based on what was put forward to him as the views of the intelligence community", and those views came from "an aggregation" of sources. Newsweek reported, "The new documents also raise the possibility that caveats raised by intelligence analysts about al-Libi's claims were withheld from Powell when he was preparing his Security Council speech. Larry Wilkerson, who served as Powell's chief of staff and oversaw the vetting of Powell's speech, responded to an e-mail from Newsweek Wednesday stating that he was unaware of the DIA doubts about al-Libi at the time the speech was being prepared. 'We never got any dissent with respect to those lines you cite ... indeed the entire section that now we know came from [al-Libi],' Wilkerson wrote."

=== 2003 British intelligence report ===
In January 2003, British intelligence completed a classified report on Iraq. The report was leaked to the BBC, who published information about it on February 5 (the day that Colin Powell addressed the United Nations). According to the BBC, the report "says al-Qaeda leader Osama Bin Laden views Iraq's ruling Ba'ath party as running contrary to his religion, calling it an 'apostate regime'. 'His aims are in ideological conflict with present day Iraq,' it says." The BBC reported that former British Foreign Secretary Jack Straw said that intelligence indicated that the Iraqi regime appeared to be allowing a permissive environment "in which al-Qaeda is able to operate ... Certainly we have some evidence of links between al-Qaeda and various people in Iraq ... What we don't know, and the prime minister and I have made it very clear, is the extent of those links ... What we also know, however, is that the Iraqi regime have been up to their necks in the pursuit of terrorism generally."

=== 2003 Israeli intelligence ===
In February 2003, Israeli intelligence sources told the Associated Press that no link had been conclusively established between Saddam and al-Qaeda. According to the AP story, "Boaz Ganor, an Israeli counter-terrorism expert, told the AP he knows of no Iraqi ties to terror groups, beyond Baghdad's relationship with Palestinian militias and possibly Osama bin Laden's Al Qaeda ... A senior Israeli security source told the AP that Israel has not yet found evidence of an Iraqi-Palestinian-Al Qaeda triangle, and that several investigations into possible Al Qaeda ties to Palestinian militias have so far not yielded substantial results. Ganor said Al Qaeda has put out feelers to Palestinian groups, but ties are at a very preliminary stage."

=== 2003 Feith memo ===
A 2007 Pentagon inspector general's report concluded that Douglas Feith's office in the Department of Defense had "developed, produced, and then disseminated alternative intelligence assessments on the Iraq and al-Qaeda relationship, which included some conclusions that were inconsistent with the consensus of the Intelligence Community, to senior decision-makers." In October 2003, Feith (undersecretary of defense for policy and head of the controversial Office of Special Plans) sent a memo to Congress that included "a classified annex containing a list and description of the requested reports, so that the committee could obtain the reports from the relevant members of the intelligence community ... The classified annex was not an analysis of the substantive issue of the relationship between Iraq and al Qaeda, and it drew no conclusions." The memo was leaked to the media, and became the foundation of reports in the Weekly Standard by Stephen F. Hayes. W. Patrick Lang, former head of the Middle East section of Defense Intelligence Agency, called the Feith memo "a listing of a mass of unconfirmed reports, many of which themselves indicate that the two groups continued to try to establish some sort of relationship. If they had such a productive relationship, why did they have to keep trying?" Daniel Benjamin also criticized the memo, noting that "in any serious intelligence review, much of the material presented would quickly be discarded." The Pentagon said, "Individuals who leak or purport to leak classified information are doing serious harm to national security; such activity is deplorable and may be illegal."

=== 2004 Carnegie study ===
Carnegie Endowment for International Peace scholars Joseph Cirincione, Jessica Tuchman Mathews and George Perkovich published their study, WMD in Iraq: Evidence and Implications, in January 2004. The study looked into Saddam's relationship with al-Qaeda, concluding that "although there have been periodic meetings between Iraqi and Al Qaeda agents, and visits by Al Qaeda agents to Baghdad, the most intensive searching over the last two years has produced no solid evidence of a cooperative relationship between Saddam's government and Al Qaeda." It also found "some evidence that there were no operational links" between the two entities.

=== 2004 FBI interrogation reports ===
During the interrogation of Saddam Hussein in the first half of 2004, FBI special agent George Piro had 25 face-to-face meetings with Saddam Hussein while he was held as a prisoner of war at the United States military detention facility at Baghdad International Airport. Piro's reports, filed during the interrogation, were declassified and released in 2009 after a U.S. Freedom of Information Act request. Hussein had reportedly maintained that he did not collaborate with al-Qaeda, said he feared al-Qaeda would have turned on him, and was quoted as calling Osama bin Laden a "zealot."

=== 9/11 Commission Report ===
The July 2004 9/11 Commission Report addressed a possible conspiracy between the government of Iraq and al-Qaeda in the September 11 attacks. The report addressed allegations of contacts between al-Qaeda and members of Saddam Hussein's government and concluded that there was no evidence that such contacts developed into a collaborative relationship, and they did not cooperate to commit terrorist attacks against the United States.

=== 2004 Senate report of pre-war intelligence on Iraq ===
The Senate Select Committee on Intelligence examined "the quality and quantity of U.S. intelligence on Iraqi weapons of mass destruction, ties to terrorist groups, Saddam Hussein's threat to stability and security in the region, and his repression of his own people;" and "the objectivity, reasonableness, independence, and accuracy of the judgments reached by the Intelligence Community". The committee examined the CIA's five intelligence products on Iraqi links to terrorism, focusing on the agency's 2003 study, in section 12 of the report: "Iraq's Links to Terrorism". It concluded that the CIA had accurately concluded that contacts between Saddam Hussein's regime and members of al-Qaeda did not constitute a formal relationship. Based on information the CIA made available to the Senate committee, it published the Senate Report on Iraqi WMD Intelligence critiquing the intelligence-gathering process.

=== 2004 CIA report ===
In August 2004, the CIA finished another assessment of possible links between Iraq and al-Qaeda. The assessment had been requested by the Office of the Vice President, which asked the CIA to reexamine the possibility that Jordanian terrorist Abu Musab al-Zarqawi constituted a link between Saddam and al-Qaeda (as Colin Powell had said in his speech to the United Nations Security Council). The assessment concluded that there was no evidence that Saddam Hussein's regime had harbored al-Zarqawi. A U.S. official familiar with the new CIA assessment said that intelligence analysts were unable to determine conclusively the nature of the relationship between al-Zarqawi and Saddam. "It's still being worked," he said. "It (the assessment) ... doesn't make clear-cut, bottom-line judgments" about whether Saddam's regime aided al-Zarqawi. The official told Knight Ridder, "What is indisputable is that Zarqawi was operating out of Baghdad and was involved in a lot of bad activities"; the report did not conclude, however, that Saddam's regime had provided "aid, comfort and succor" to al-Zarqawi. According to the Knight Ridder story, "Some officials believe that Saddam's secular regime kept an eye on al-Zarqawi, but didn't actively assist him." Knight Ridder reporters called the CIA study "the latest assessment that calls into question one of President Bush's key justifications for last year's U.S.-led invasion of Iraq."

==== 2005 update ====
In October 2005, the CIA updated its 2004 report to conclude that Saddam's regime "did not have a relationship, harbor, or even turn a blind eye toward Mr. Zarqawi and his associates". Two counterterrorism analysts told Newsweek that Zarqawi probably received medical treatment in Baghdad in 2002, but Saddam's government may never have known that he was in Iraq because he used "false cover." MSNBC reported that an intelligence official told Newsweek that, according to the report's current draft, "most evidence suggests Saddam Hussein did not provide Zarqawi safe haven before the war. It also recognizes that there are still unanswered questions and gaps in knowledge about the relationship ... The most recent CIA analysis is an update—based on fresh reporting from Iraq and interviews with former Saddam officials—of a classified report that analysts in the CIA's Directorate of Intelligence first produced more than a year ago."

=== 2006 Pentagon study ===
In February 2006, the Pentagon published a study of the "Harmony database" documents captured in Afghanistan. Although the study did not address allegations of Iraqi ties to al-Qaeda, it analyzed papers that offer insight into the history of the movement and tensions among its leadership. The Pentagon found evidence that al-Qaeda jihadists viewed Saddam as an "infidel", and advised against working with him.

=== 2006 U.S. Senate report ===
In September 2006, the Senate Select Committee on Intelligence released two bipartisan reports which constituted Phase II of its study of prewar intelligence claims about Iraq's pursuit of WMD and alleged links to al-Qaeda. The reports concluded, according to David Stout of The New York Times, that "there is no evidence that Saddam Hussein had prewar ties to Al Qaeda and one of the terror organization's most notorious members, Abu Musab al-Zarqawi." Senator John Rockefeller, the committee's ranking Democrat, said: "Today's reports show that the administration's repeated allegations of a past, present and future relationship between al Qaeda and Iraq were wrong and intended to exploit the deep sense of insecurity among Americans in the immediate aftermath of the September 11th attacks."

==== Administration response ====
After the report was released, Condoleezza Rice told Fox News Sunday that she did not remember seeing that particular report and "there were ties between Iraq and al-Qaeda." In an interview with Tim Russert on Meet the Press, Vice President Cheney said: "We've never been able to confirm any connection between Iraq and 9/11." He reiterated that there was a connection between Iraq and al-Qaeda, citing Zarqawi's presence in Baghdad and DCI George Tenet's claim of "a relationship that went back at least a decade." Pressed about the Senate report, Cheney said: "I haven't seen the report. I haven't had a chance to read it yet."

=== 2007 Pentagon inspector general's report ===
The Pentagon's inspector general issued a February 2007 report which found that the actions of Feith's Office of Special Plans, the source of most misleading intelligence about al-Qaeda and Iraq, were inappropriate but not illegal. Senator Carl Levin, Chair of the Senate Armed Services Committee, said: "The bottom line is that intelligence relating to the Iraq-al-Qaeda relationship was manipulated by high-ranking officials in the Department of Defense to support the administration's decision to invade Iraq. The inspector general's report is a devastating condemnation of inappropriate activities in the DOD policy office that helped take this nation to war."

Feith said, however, that he felt vindicated by the report's conclusion that what he did was not unlawful. He told The Washington Post that his office produced a criticism of the consensus of the intelligence community, acknowledging that he "was not endorsing its substance."

=== 2008 Pentagon report ===
Saddam and Terrorism: Emerging Insights from Captured Iraqi Documents, a Pentagon-sponsored March 2008 study, was based on the review of over 600,000 Iraqi documents captured after the 2003 US invasion. The study found no direct connection between Iraq and al-Qaeda. It noted that during the early 1990s, "Saddam supported groups that either associated directly with al Qaeda (such as the Egyptian Islamic Jihad, led at one time by bin Laden's deputy, Ayman al-Zawahiri) or that generally shared al Qaeda's stated goals and objectives."

According to the abstract,

While these documents do not reveal direct coordination and assistance between the Saddam regime and the al Qaeda network, they do indicate that Saddam was willing to use, albeit cautiously, operatives affiliated with al Qaeda as long as Saddam could have these terrorist–operatives monitored closely ... This created both the appearance of and, in some ways, a 'de facto' link between the organizations. At times, these organizations would work together in pursuit of shared goals but still maintain their autonomy and independence because of innate caution and mutual distrust.

The report also stated that "captured documents reveal that the regime was willing to co-opt or support organizations it knew to be part of al Qaeda." In July 2001, the IIS director for international intelligence ordered an investigation of a terrorist group known as the Army of Muhammad. The investigation revealed that the group "threatened Kuwaiti authorities and plans to attack American and Western interests", and was working with Osama bin Laden. According to the report, "A later memorandum from the same collection to the Director of the IIS reports that the Army of Muhammad is endeavoring to receive assistance [from Iraq] to implement its objectives, and that the local IIS station has been told to deal with them in accordance with priorities previously established. The IIS agent goes on to inform the Director that 'this organization is an offshoot of bin Laden, but that their objectives are similar but with different names that can be a way of camouflaging the organization.'"

ABC News noted about the report that the primary target of Saddam's terror activities was not the United States or Israel: "The predominant targets of Iraqi state terror operations were Iraqi citizens, both inside and outside of Iraq." Saddam's primary aim was self-preservation and the elimination of potential internal threats to his power.

=== 2008 U.S. Senate report ===
In June 2008, the Senate Select Committee on Intelligence released the final part of its Phase II investigation of the intelligence assessments that led to the U.S. invasion and occupation of Iraq; this part of the investigation looked into statements by members of the Bush administration, and compared those statements to what the intelligence community was telling the administration at the time. The report, endorsed by eight Democrats and two Republicans on the committee, concluded that "Statements and implications by the President and Secretary of State suggesting that Iraq and al-Qa'ida had a partnership, or that Iraq had provided al-Qa'ida with weapons training, were not substantiated by the intelligence." It concluded that "Statements ... regarding Iraq's contacts with al-Qa'ida were substantiated by intelligence information. However, policymakers' statements did not accurately convey the intelligence assessments of the nature of these contacts, and left the impression that the contacts led to substantive Iraqi cooperation or support of al-Qa'ida" and "Statements that Iraq provided safe haven for Abu Musab al-Zarqawi and other al-Qa'ida-related terrorist members were substantiated by the intelligence assessments. Intelligence assessments noted Zarqawi's presence in Iraq and his ability to travel and operate within the country. The intelligence community generally believed that Iraqi intelligence must have known about, and therefore at least tolerated, Zarqawi's presence in the country."

The New York Times called the report "especially critical of statements by the president and vice president linking Iraq to Al Qaeda and raising the possibility that Mr. Hussein might supply the terrorist group with unconventional weapons." Committee chair John D. Rockefeller IV wrote in an addendum to the report, "Representing to the American people that the two had an operational partnership and posed a single, indistinguishable threat was fundamentally misleading and led the nation to war on false premises."

In a minority addendum to the report signed by four Republican dissenters, the Republicans "suggested that the investigation was a partisan smoke screen to obscure the real story: that the C.I.A. failed the Bush administration by delivering intelligence assessments to policy makers that have since been discredited." The minority senators did not take issue with the majority's conclusion that there was no evidence of a Saddam-al-Qaeda conspiracy, but objected to the manner in which the report was assembled and called the finished product "a waste of Committee time and resources." The dissent focused on the committee's reluctance to include statements by previous administrations and members of Congress about prewar intelligence, and objected to the report's conclusion that President Bush and Vice President Cheney made statements that Saddam was prepared to give WMD to terrorist groups for attacks against the United States.
