= Michael Scheuer =

American counterterrorism analyst (born 1952)

- Born: 1952 (age 73–74); Buffalo, New York, U.S.
- Education: Canisius College (BA); Niagara University (MA); Carleton University (MA); University of Manitoba (PhD)
- Occupations: Former CIA intelligence officer, blogger, author, foreign policy critic, political analyst, adjunct professor
- Political party: Republican
- Spouse: Alfreda Frances Bikowsky
- Website: non-intervention2.com

Michael F. Scheuer (SHOY-ure; born 1952) is an American former intelligence officer for the Central Intelligence Agency (CIA), blogger, author, commentator and former adjunct professor at Georgetown University's Center for Peace and Security Studies. One assignment during his 22-year career was serving as Chief of the Bin Laden Issue Station (the Osama bin Laden tracking unit at the Counterterrorism Center, known as "Alec Station") from 1996 to 1999. He also served as Special Advisor to the Chief of Alec Station from September 2001 to November 2004.

Scheuer became a public figure after being outed as the anonymous author of the book Imperial Hubris (2004), in which he criticized many of the United States' assumptions about Islamist insurgencies and particularly Osama bin Laden. Later in 2004, shortly after the "outing" of Scheuer's harsh criticism of America's close alliance with Israel, Scheuer resigned from his position at the CIA. In his book, Scheuer depicted bin Laden as a rational actor who was fighting to weaken the United States by weakening its economy, rather than merely combating and killing Americans.

Scheuer challenges the common assumption that terrorism is the threat facing the United States in the modern era, arguing rather that Islamist insurgency (and not "terrorism") is the core of the conflict between the U.S. and Islamist forces, who in places such as Kashmir, Xinjiang, and Chechnya are "struggling not just for independence but against institutionalized barbarism." Osama bin Laden acknowledged the book in a 2007 statement, suggesting that it revealed "the reasons for your losing the war against us".

In February 2009, Scheuer was fired from his position as a senior fellow of the Jamestown Foundation by the foundation's president. In December 2013 and January 2014, Scheuer was criticized for seeming to advise American citizens to seriously consider assassinating U.S. president Barack Obama. In September 2014, in addition to earlier "praise" received from al-Qaeda, the Islamic State issued a press release quoting Scheuer in order to appeal to an American audience.

== Biography ==
Scheuer was born in Buffalo, New York, and graduated from Canisius College with a BA in history in 1974. He went on to earn an MA in American History from Niagara University in 1976 and another MA in American Canadian Relations from Carleton University in 1982. He also received a PhD in British Empire–U.S.–Canada–U.K. relations from the University of Manitoba in 1986.

Scheuer served in the CIA for 22 years before resigning in 2004. He was chief of the Bin Laden Issue Station at the CIA's Counterterrorism Center from 1996 to 1999, and worked as Special Adviser to the Chief of the bin Laden unit from September 2001 to November 2004. He is now known to have been the anonymous author of both the 2004 book Imperial Hubris: Why the West is Losing the War on Terror and the earlier anonymous work Through Our Enemies' Eyes: Osama bin Laden, Radical Islam, and the Future of America. After his anonymously published books were publicly associated with his name, he was mentioned by Osama bin Laden in his statement of September 7, 2007.

After leaving the CIA in 2004, Scheuer worked as a news analyst for CBS News and a terrorism analyst for the Jamestown Foundation's online publication Global Terrorism Analysis. He made radio and television appearances and taught a graduate-level course on al-Qaeda at Georgetown University. He also participates in conferences on terrorism and national security issues, such as the New America Foundation's December 2004 conference, "Al Qaeda 2.0: Transnational Terrorism After 9/11."

In 2009, Scheuer reported that he had lost his position as a Senior Fellow with the Jamestown Foundation, after "several major financial donors to Jamestown threatened to withdraw funding" if he continued in that role. The funding threats were pursuant to his criticism of Barack Obama's "dancing the Tel Aviv two-step" in allegedly kowtowing to the Israeli lobby, as well as Scheuer's disdaining of Obama's selection as Chief of Staff of Rahm Emanuel, "a U.S. citizen who during the 1991 Gulf War left America to serve in Israel's military."

== Publications ==
=== Through Our Enemies' Eyes ===
His first book, published anonymously, is an analysis of the public discourse available on al-Qaeda's ideology and strategy. In it, Scheuer explores the bin Laden phenomenon and its implications for U.S. security. He began the book in 1999 as an unclassified manual for counterterrorism officers. Due to the secrecy agreement he signed as an employee of the CIA, the book is based solely on unclassified intelligence or material available from open sources such as media reports. His main thesis in the work is that the view of bin Laden as a lunatic is a form of "myopia" that limits Western military thinkers' ability to respond to the bin Laden phenomenon. He writes that "the West's road to hell lies in approaching the bin Laden problem with the presumption that only the lunatic fringe could oppose what the United States is trying to accomplish through its foreign policy toward the Muslim world. Bin Laden's philosophy is slowly harnessing the two most powerful motivating forces in contemporary international affairs: religion and nationalism."

[T]he crux of my argument is simply that America is in a war with militant Islamists that it cannot avoid; one that it cannot talk or appease its way out of; one in which our irreconcilable Islamist foes will have to be killed, an act which unavoidably will lead to innocent deaths; and one that is motivated in large measure by the impact of U.S. foreign policies in the Islamic world, one of which is unqualified U.S. support for Israel.

=== Imperial Hubris ===
In his second book, Imperial Hubris, a New York Times bestseller, Scheuer writes that the Islamist threat to the United States is rooted in "how easy it is for Muslims to see, hear, experience, and hate the six U.S. policies bin Laden repeatedly refers to as anti-Muslim:

- U.S. support for apostate, corrupt, and tyrannical Muslim governments.
- U.S. and other Western troops on the Arabian Peninsula.
- U.S. support for Israel that keeps Palestinians in the Israelis' thrall.
- U.S. pressure on Arab energy producers to keep oil prices low.
- U.S. occupation of Iraq and Afghanistan.
- U.S. support for Russia, India, and China against their Muslim militants."

Scheuer contends that Al-Qaeda is following a martial strategy that is more rational than it is given credit for among Western politicians and media. He cites Carl von Clausewitz's dictum that one must strike one's enemy's "center of gravity", and pairs it with an al-Qaeda writer's assertion that "the American economy is the American center of gravity".

In a videotape released around September 7, 2007, Osama bin Laden stated, "If you want to understand what's going on and if you would like to get to know some of the reasons for your losing the war against us, then read the book of Michael Scheuer."

=== Marching Toward Hell ===
Scheuer's book Marching Toward Hell: America and Islam After Iraq was published on February 12, 2008. It details how the 2003 Iraq War has affected Al-Qaeda and the United States. He argues that the instability in the Iraq War has benefited Al-Qaeda without serving any U.S. interests.

== Views ==
=== War on Terror ===
Scheuer's views emphasized the danger of Osama bin Laden and al-Qaeda, as well as the ineffectiveness of U.S. policy against these imminent threats. The threat to the United States, Scheuer has consistently maintained, continues to grow, and the U.S. continually fails to grasp the nature of the struggle in which it is engaged: Islamist and anti-American sentiment continue to grow around the world, and the bin Laden movement is aimed, not at killing or conquering Americans or reforming their internal political systems, but rather bankrupting them in order to reduce their worldwide influence and thereby liberate Muslims from the yoke of American political, military, and financial influence. The failure of the U.S. to apprehend this threat is, in part, rooted in a misunderstanding and underestimation of Osama bin Laden himself. To Scheuer, Osama bin Laden's "beliefs, goals, and intentions" were

carefully chosen, plainly spoken, and precise. He has set out the Muslim world's problems as he sees them; determined that they are caused by the United States; explained why they must be remedied; and outlined how he will try to do so. Seldom in America's history has an enemy laid out so clearly the basis for the war he is waging against it.

Scheuer's criticism of U.S. foreign policy includes a sweeping condemnation of the invasion of Iraq, which he has characterized as a "Christmas present" to Osama bin Laden's Islamist recruitment efforts, and a validation of bin Laden's claims that the U.S. is at war with Islam. From his personal involvement in background research in the run-up to the war, Scheuer states that "there was no connection between [Al Qaeda] and Saddam."

U.S. rhetoric about bin Laden having allegedly "hat[ed] freedom" has also irked Scheuer, who suggests that those "willing to give their lives to destroy the dictatorship in Saudi Arabia ... must want freedom in some kind of way." This erroneous rhetoric, according to Scheuer, is not only to be found in the media and among politicians, but even in the 9/11 Commission Report, in which bin Laden and his followers were identified "as takfiris, who kill Muslims if they don't agree with them. They're not takfiris. They're just very devout, severe Salafists and Wahhabis."

The insistence on referring to al-Qaeda and the Islamist movement around it as a terrorist group or terrorist movement has also been a mistake, according to Scheuer. The U.S. is faced with an insurgency, rather than mere terrorism. Speaking on the BBC News on November 9, 2012, Scheuer criticized what he called the Obama administration's deceit about the threat from Islamic militants, and misleading the American people in his first administration by claiming that the word "jihad" had nothing to do with military affairs, and that it had to do with "self reform and community improvement", which Scheuer claims was a blatant lie.

=== Clinton and Bush administrations ===
Scheuer has been critical of the Clinton and Bush administrations for not having killed bin Laden, for costly and disastrous policy missteps, and for not taking decisive measures to defend the country. He states that Clinton had eight to ten opportunities to kill bin Laden prior to September 11, and Bush had one opportunity thereafter. Richard A. Clarke and the Clinton administration, according to Scheuer, thwarted the CIA's ambitions to kidnap or kill bin Laden when they had the chance. According to Scheuer,

Clarke's book Against All Enemies is also a crucial complement to the September 11 panel's failure to condemn Mr. Clinton's failure to capture or kill bin Laden on any of the eight to 10 chances afforded by CIA reporting. Mr. Clarke never mentions that President Bush had no chances to kill bin Laden before September 11 and leaves readers with the false impression that he, Mr. Clinton and Mr. Clinton's national security adviser, Sandy Berger, did their best to end the bin Laden threat. That trio, in my view, abetted al Qaeda, and if the September 11 families were smart they would focus on the dereliction of Dick [Clarke], Bill [Clinton] and Sandy [Berger] and not the antics of convicted September 11 conspirator Zacarias Moussaoui.

Of the Bush administration, Scheuer warns against assigning it full responsibility for the nation's troubles since September 11, 2001. Although the "unprovoked attack of Iraq" will forever be remembered as "infamous", as will Dick Cheney's "reptilian contention that Americans who criticize U.S. foreign policy are 'validating the strategy of the terrorists'"; according to Scheuer, a "bipartisan governing elite", both Democratic and Republican, is to blame for the nation's woes. (Notwithstanding the bipartisan responsibility, Scheuer comments, "the thought of what history will say about Donald Rumsfeld's tenure at the Department of Defense ought to make his relatives shudder down to their latest generation.")

=== Pending threats ===
In 2007, Scheuer said "The Iranians are no threat to the United States unless we provoke them. They may be a threat to the Israelis. They're not a threat to the United States. The threat to the United States, inside the United States, comes from al Qaeda. ... These people are going to detonate a nuclear device inside the United States, and we're going to have absolutely nothing to respond against."

=== Israel and the Lobby ===
Scheuer has stated that the Mearsheimer and Walt paper The Israel Lobby and U.S. Foreign Policy is essentially correct. Israel, according to Scheuer, has engaged in one of the most successful campaigns to influence public opinion in the United States ever conducted by a foreign government. Scheuer said to NPR that "They [Mearsheimer and Walt] should be credited for the courage they have had to actually present a paper on the subject. I hope they move on and do the Saudi lobby, which is probably more dangerous to the United States than the Israeli lobby."

In Marching Toward Hell, Scheuer laments "the war in Iraq that was instigated by U.S. citizen Israel-firsters and their evangelical Christian allies". He continues,

Because both U.S. political parties are wholly owned subsidiaries of the American Israeli Public Affairs Committee (AIPAC) and the Israeli government, there is no large-scale U.S. military withdrawal from Iraq in the cards ... If you doubt this, keep in mind the name Rahm Emanuel. Slated to be the president-elect's chief of staff, Mr. Emanuel has labored as a volunteer for AIPAC's various anti-U.S. causes, strove to ensure the defeat of anti-Iraq War Democratic congressional candidates in 2006, and in 1991, as a 32-year-old U.S. citizen, chose to serve with the Israeli Defense Forces rather than volunteer to fight for the United States in the war against Saddam's Iraq.

In April 2009, Scheuer participated in the Doha Debates at Georgetown University, where he debated for the motion "This house believes that it is time for the USA to get tough on Israel" with fellow speaker Avraham Burg. Speakers against the motion were Dore Gold and Alan Dershowitz. Burg and Scheuer won the debate, with 63% of the audience voting for the motion. During the debate, Scheuer suggested that "the war in Iraq is the responsibility of the American fifth column that supports Israel" and accused Dershowitz of being part of this "fifth column". Dershowitz responded that he opposed the war in Iraq, that "more Jews than any other ethnic group in America opposed the war in Iraq" and that Scheuer was engaging in "bigotry."

=== Iraq and al-Qaeda ===
Thomas Joscelyn of Weekly Standard wrote a critical piece on Scheuer and an interview Scheuer did on Hardball with Chris Matthews. According to Joscelyn, Scheuer's claims that "there was no evidence of a relationship between Saddam Hussein's Iraq and al Qaeda", in various interviews, "directly contradicted" Scheuer's earlier assertions, in his first book, in which Scheuer "cited numerous pieces of evidence showing that there was, in fact, a working relationship between Saddam and al Qaeda."

Scheuer wrote about a relationship between Saddam Hussein and al-Qaeda in his 2002 book. Yet when interviewed in 2004 he stated that he had found no evidence of a Saddam/al-Qaeda connection. Tim Russert asked Scheuer to explain the seeming contradiction on Meet the Press (30 November 2004):

MR. SCHEUER: I certainly saw a link when I was writing the books in terms of the open-source literature, unclassified literature, but I had nothing to do with Iraq during my professional career until the run-up to the war. What I was talking about on "Hardball" was, I was assigned the duty of going back about nine or 10 years in the classified archives of the CIA. I went through roughly 19,000 documents, probably totaling 50,000 to 60,000 pages, and within that corpus of material, there was absolutely no connection in the terms of a—in the terms of a relationship.

MR. RUSSERT: But your [2002] book did point out some contacts?

MR. SCHEUER: Certainly it was available in the open-source material, yes, sir.

Scheuer explains more fully in the revised edition of his 2002 book the exhaustive study of the evidence of the alleged Iraq-al-Qaeda cooperation that eventually led him to the conclusion that there was no relationship between the two forces:

For a number of reasons, I was available to perform the review of Agency files on Iraq and al Qaeda, and the chief of the bin Laden unit handed me the assignment. I was delighted with the task, eager to begin, and sure that my research would support the analysis I had presented in Through Our Enemies' Eyes. For about four weeks in late 2002 and early 2003, I and several others were engaged full time in searching CIA files—seven days a week, often far more than eight hours a day. At the end of the effort, we had gone back ten years in the files and had reviewed nearly twenty thousand documents that amounted to well over fifty thousand pages of materials. I was both pleased and embarrassed by the results of the research. I was pleased because CIA's position was reaffirmed and the analysis of Mr. Feith's unit was discredited. There was no information that remotely supported the analysis that claimed there was a strong working relationship between Iraq and al Qaeda. I was embarrassed because this reality invalidated the analysis I had presented on the subject in my book.

=== Libyan insurgency ===
Scheuer has stated his objection to any involvement by the U.S. in the Libyan insurgency, being particularly critical of the work of United States' UN representative Susan E. Rice, calling the whole affair "none of our business" and essentially a "recruiting tool for terrorists." His overall view is that the interests of U.S. foreign policy are far better served by the current status quo, whereby the existing autocratic regimes are better able to suppress the threat he perceives from Al-Qaeda incursion than Western-style democratic systems. Scheuer believes that, irrespective of NATO ostensibly leading the bombing operations, "in the Muslim world, this is Americans killing Muslims again, and it looks like it's for oil."

=== 2012 endorsement of Ron Paul ===
Scheuer penned an editorial in late December 2011 endorsing U.S. presidential candidate Ron Paul. He said, "Dr. Paul's precise use of history and common sense exposes the exorbitantly costly effort to build democracies in the Islamic world for what it is; namely, Washington throwing money down the drain for a cause that is impossibly lost from the start and one that will involve us in wars where we have no interests."

=== 2016 endorsement of Donald Trump ===
Scheuer expressed his support for U.S. presidential candidate Donald Trump in multiple blog postings on non-intervention.com. Scheuer based his support on, in his view, Trump's strong support of the Second Amendment, Trump's proposed wall along the US border with Mexico, Trump's skepticism of NATO and military intervention in the Muslim World, and Trump's unpopularity with neoconservatives and their media outlets such as The Weekly Standard, National Review, and also much of the mainstream media. Scheuer also likes Trump's "America First" talk towards American statecraft.

On December 23, 2013, Scheuer endorsed the extrajudicial killing of then-Prime Minister of Britain David Cameron and President Barack Obama, endorsing the view of Algernon Sidney that "by an established law among the most virtuous nations, every man might kill a tyrant; and no names are recorded in history with more honor, than of those who did it."

=== European Union ===
In March 2018, Scheuer claimed that the European Union was in the process of "falling apart", saying that British Prime Minister Theresa May was "siding with the EU" during the future relation talks of the UK leaving the European Union.

Scheuer has called for the public execution of European politicians, saying that "all European rulers are tyrants" adding that "they are a despicable bunch, the people that head the European Union, and they really deserve to be hung." He is critical of the EU's abolition of the death penalty and the implications it has on the deportation of terrorist suspects, saying that "the EU's policy of easily obtainable political asylum and its prohibition against deporting wanted or convicted terrorists to a country with a death penalty have made Europe a major, consistent and invulnerable source of terrorist threat to the United States." Scheuer sees the extraordinary renditions carried out by the U.S. government as being hindered by the European Union: "The extraordinary rendition programme should not be destroyed because of "venal and prize hungry reporters, grandstanding politicians and sanctimonious Europeans."

=== Allegation of antisemitism ===
Scheuer has been quoted to say that American Jews are disloyal and "must be stopped and then scoured from the continent".

== Portrayals ==
In the Hulu miniseries, The Looming Tower (2018), Scheuer is the basis for the character of Martin Schmidt (portrayed by Peter Sarsgaard), depicted as one of two people primarily responsible for the lack of intelligence sharing between the CIA and the FBI in the lead-up to 9/11.

== Bibliography ==
=== Books ===
- Through Our Enemies' Eyes: Osama Bin Laden, Radical Islam & the Future of America. Brassey's Inc. ISBN 1-57488-553-7. (2003)
- Imperial Hubris: Why the West is Losing the War on Terror. Brassey's Inc. ISBN 1-57488-849-8. (2004)
- Marching Towards Hell: America and Islam After Iraq. Free Press, Simon & Schuster. ISBN 0-7432-9969-8. (2008)
- Osama Bin Laden. Oxford University Press. ISBN 978-0-19-973866-3. (2011)
- Introduction to Inside the Jihad by Omar Nasiri

=== Articles ===
- "Battling the terrorists" Washington Times 26 December 2004
- "Unraveling the Saga of Zarqawi's Injury", Terrorism Focus, 2:11, 10 June 2005
- "Embracing a Lethal Tar Baby", Antiwar.com February 27, 2006
- "How Bush Helps Jihadists", Washington Times, 13 March 2006
- "Al-Qaeda Doctrine: Training the Individual Warrior", Terrorism Focus, 28 March 2006
- "Does Israel Conduct Covert Action in America? You Bet it Does", Antiwar.com, 8 April 2006
- "Tenet Tries to Shift the Blame. Don't Buy It", Washington Post, 29 April 2007
- "Reading Bin Laden's Mind: The State of the Jihad, As He Might See It", Washington Post, 17 February 2008
- "Barack Obama, Interventionist and Ultimate Jihadi Hero", Antiwar.com, 29 May 2008
- "Turning the Tables on the Israel-Firsters", Antiwar.com, 16 July 2008

== See also ==
- Philip Giraldi
- John P. O'Neill
