= Inside the Jihad =

Inside the Jihad: My Life with al Qaeda, a Spy's Story
- Author: Omar Nasiri
- Publication date: 2006
- Media type: Print

Inside the Jihad: My Life with al Qaeda, a Spy's Story is a book published by Basic Books, written by a Moroccan who has adopted the pen-name Omar Nasiri.

In the novel, Nasiri describes moving to Europe, after being involved in petty crime in his homeland of Morocco. By 1996, however, he had been recruited by radical Islamic fundamentalists, and subsequently became an informant for European counter-terrorism agencies, such as the DGSE. He would later infiltrate the Khalden training camp in Afghanistan, where he would meet such influential al-Qaeda leaders as Ibn al-Shaykh al-Libi. Upon returning to Europe, he continued his work as a spy in London, before moving to Germany and getting married.

== Translate ==
The book was translated to Persian and published by "Shahid Kazemi Publications" in 568 pages on 2019. The book is now in its fourth edition.

== See also ==
- Ibn al-Shaykh al-Libi
- Abu Zubaydah
- Midhat Mursi
- Abu Hamza
- Afghan training camp
- Omar Khadr
- Derunta training camp

== Reviews of Inside the Jihad ==
- Ahmed Rashid author of "Taliban: Militant Islam, Oil and Fundamentalism in Central Asia"
- Michael Scheuer author of "Imperial Hubris", "Through Our Enemies Eyes" and "Marching Toward Hell America and Islam After Iraq"
