= Ibn al-Shaykh al-Libi =

Libyan native arrested in Afghanistan

- Born: 1963; Ajdabiya, Kingdom of Libya
- Arrested: November 2001; Pakistan; Central Intelligence Agency and Libyan government
- Died: May 10, 2009 (aged 45–46); Libya
- Citizenship: Libyan citizenship
- Detained at: Pakistan (2001), Egypt (2001-2005), Abu Salim prison in Tripoli (2005-2009)
- Charge: Terrorism

Ibn al-Shaykh al-Libi (English: "Son of the Libyan Sheikh") (Arabic: إبْنُ ٱلشَّيْخِ اللّيبي; born Ali Mohamed Abdul Aziz al-Fakheri; 1963 – May 10, 2009) was a Libyan national captured in Afghanistan in November 2001 after the fall of the Taliban; he was interrogated by American and Egyptian forces. The information he gave under torture to Egyptian authorities was cited by the George W. Bush administration in the months preceding its 2003 invasion of Iraq as evidence of a connection between Saddam Hussein and al-Qaeda. That information was frequently repeated by members of the Bush administration, although reports from both the Central Intelligence Agency (CIA) and the Defense Intelligence Agency (DIA) strongly questioned its credibility, suggesting that al-Libi was "intentionally misleading" interrogators.

In 2006, the United States transferred al-Libi to Libya, where he was imprisoned by the government of Muammar Gaddafi. He was reported to have tuberculosis. On May 19, 2009, the government reported that he had recently committed suicide in prison. Human Rights Watch, whose representatives had recently visited him, called for an investigation into the circumstances of his death; The New York Times reported that Ayman al-Zawahiri had asserted that Libya had tortured al-Libi to death.

== Training camp director ==
In Afghanistan, al-Libi led the Al Khaldan training camp, where Zacarias Moussaoui and Ahmed Ressam trained. Moussaoui and Ressam would later be involved in plots to carry out attacks in the United States. An associate of Abu Zubaydah, al-Libi had his assets frozen by the U.S. government following the September 11 attacks; on September 26, 2002, the U.S. government published a list of terrorists who were covered by this restriction.

The Uyghur Turkistan Islamic Party's "Islamic Turkistan" magazine in its 5th edition published an obituary of its member Turghun (Ibn Umar al Turkistani) speaking of his time training at the Al Khaldan training camp and his meeting with Ibn al-Shaykh al-Libi. The Uyghurs in Afghanistan fought against the American bombings and the Northern Alliance after the September 11, 2001 attacks. Ibn Umar died fighting against the Americans at the Qalai Jangi prison riot.

Al-Libi was captured by Pakistani officials in November 2001, as he attempted to flee Afghanistan following the collapse of the Taliban after the 2001 U.S. invasion of Afghanistan. He was transferred to US military custody in January 2002.

Department of Defense spokesmen used to routinely describe the Khaldan training camp as an al-Qaeda training camp, and Al-Libi and Abu Zubaydah as senior members of al-Qaeda. But, during testimony at their Combatant Status Review Tribunals, several Guantanamo captives, including Zubaydah, described the Khaldan camp as having been run by a rival jihadist organization – one that did not support attacking civilians.

== Cooperation with the FBI ==
Al-Libi was turned over to the FBI and held at Bagram Air Base. When talking to the FBI interrogators Russell Fincher and Marty Mahon, he seemed "genuinely friendly" and spoke chiefly in English, calling for a translator only when necessary. He seemed to bond with Fincher, a devout Christian, and the two prayed together and discussed religion at length.

Al-Libi told the interrogators details about Richard Reid, a British citizen who had joined al-Qaeda and trained to carry out a suicide bombing of an airliner, which he unsuccessfully attempted on December 22, 2001. Al-Libi agreed to continue cooperating if the United States would allow his wife and her family to emigrate, while he was prosecuted within the American legal system.

== In CIA custody ==
The CIA asked President George W. Bush for permission to take al-Libi into their own custody and rendition him to a foreign country for more "tough guy" questioning, and were granted permission. They "simply came and took al-Libi away from the FBI." One CIA officer was heard telling their new prisoner that "You know where you are going. Before you get there, I am going to find your mother and fuck her".

In the second week of January 2002, al-Libi was flown to the USS Bataan in the northern Arabian Sea, a ship being used to hold eight other notable prisoners, including John Walker Lindh. He was subsequently transferred to Egyptian interrogators.

== Information provided ==
According to The Washington Post,

Under questioning, al-Libi provided the CIA with intelligence about an alleged plot to blow up the U.S. Embassy in Yemen with a truck bomb and pointed officials in the direction of Abu Zubaydah, a top al Qaeda leader known to have been involved in the Sept. 11 plot.

On September 15, 2002, Time published an article that detailed the CIA interrogations of Omar al-Faruq. It said,

On Sept. 9, according to a secret CIA summary of the interview, al-Faruq confessed that he was, in fact, al-Qaeda's senior representative in Southeast Asia. Then came an even more shocking confession: according to the CIA document, al-Faruq said two senior al-Qaeda officials, Abu Zubaydah and Ibn al-Shaykh al-Libi, had ordered him to 'plan large-scale attacks against U.S. interests in Indonesia, Malaysia, the Philippines, Singapore, Thailand, Taiwan, Vietnam and Cambodia.'

Al-Libi has been identified as a principal source of faulty prewar intelligence regarding chemical weapons training between Iraq and al-Qaeda that was used by the Bush administration to justify the invasion of Iraq. Specifically, he told interrogators that Iraq provided training to al-Qaeda in the area of "chemical and biological weapons". In Cincinnati in October 2002, Bush informed the public: "Iraq has trained al Qaeda members in bomb making and poisons and gases."

This claim was repeated several times in the run-up to the war, including in then-Secretary of State Colin Powell's speech to the UN Security Council on February 5, 2003, which concluded with a long recitation of the information provided by al-Libi. Powell's speech was made less than a month after a then-classified CIA report concluded that the information provided by al-Libi was unreliable, and about a year after a DIA report concluded the same thing.

Al-Libi recanted these claims in January 2004 after U.S. interrogators presented "new evidence from other detainees that cast doubt on his claims", according to Newsweek. The DIA concluded in February 2002 that al-Libi deliberately misled interrogators, in what the CIA called an "attempt to exaggerate his importance". Some speculate that his reason for giving disinformation was to draw the U.S. into an attack on Iraq—Islam's "weakest" state, a remark attributed to al-Libi—which al-Qaeda believed would lead to a global jihad. Others, including al-Libi himself, have insisted that he gave false information due to the use of torture (so-called "enhanced interrogation techniques").

An article published in the November 5, 2005 edition of The New York Times quoted two paragraphs of a Defense Intelligence Agency report, declassified upon request by Senator Carl Levin, that expressed doubts about the results of al-Libi's interrogation in February 2002.

Al-Libi told a foreign intelligence service that:

Iraq — acting on the request of al-Qa'ida militant Abu Abdullah, who was Muhammad Atif's emissary — agreed to provide unspecified chemical or biological weapons training for two al-Qa'ida associates beginning in December 2000. The two individuals departed for Iraq but did not return, so al-Libi was not in a position to know if any training had taken place.

The September 2002 version of Iraqi Support for Terrorism stated that al-Libi said Iraq had "provided" chemical and biological weapons training for two al-Qaeda associates in 2000, but also stated that al-Libi "did not know the results of the training."

The 2006 Senate Report on Pre-war Intelligence on Iraq stated that "Although DIA coordinated on CIA's Iraqi Support for Terrorism paper, DIA analysis preceding that assessment was more skeptical of the al-Libi reporting." In July 2002, DIA assessed

It is plausible al-Qa'ida attempted to obtain CB assistance from Iraq and Ibn al-Shaykh is sufficiently senior to have access to such sensitive information. However, Ibn al-Shaykh's information lacks details concerning the individual Iraqis involved, the specific CB materials associated with the assistance and the location where the alleged training occurred. The information is also second hand, and not derived from Ibn al-Shaykh's personal experience.

The Senate report also states "According to al-Libi, after his decision to fabricate information for debriefers, he 'lied about being a member of al-Qa'ida. Although he considered himself close to, but not a member of, al-Qa'ida, he knew enough about the senior members, organization and operations to claim to be a member.'"

== Senate Reports on Pre-war Intelligence on Iraq ==
On September 8, 2006, the United States Senate Select Committee on Intelligence released "Phase II" of its report on prewar intelligence on Iraq. Conclusion 3 of the report states the following:

Postwar findings support the DIA February 2002 assessment that Ibn al-Shaykh al-Libi was likely intentionally misleading his debriefers when he said that Iraq provided two al-Qa'ida associates with chemical and biological weapons (CBW) training in 2000 ... Postwar findings do not support the CIA's assessment that his reporting was credible ... No postwar information has been found that indicates CBW training occurred and the detainee who provided the key prewar reporting about this training recanted his claims after the war ... CIA's January 2003 version of Iraqi Support for Terrorism described al-Libi's reporting for CBW training "credible", but noted that the individuals who traveled to Iraq for CBW training had not returned, so al-Libi was not in position to know if the training had taken place ... In January 2004, al-Libi recanted his allegations about CBW training and many of his other claims about Iraq's links to al Qa'ida. He told debriefers that, to the best of his knowledge, al-Qa'ida never sent any individuals into Iraq for any kind of support in chemical or biological weapons. Al-libi told debriefers that he fabricated information while in U.S. custody to receive better treatment and in response to threats of being transferred to a foreign intelligence service which he believed would torture him ... He said that later, while he was being debriefed by a (REDACTED) foreign intelligence service, he fabricated more information in response to physical abuse and threats of torture. The foreign government service denies using any pressure during al-Libi's interrogation. In February 2004, the CIA reissued the debriefing reports from al-Libi to note that he had recanted information. A CIA officer explained that while CIA believes al-Libi fabricated information, the CIA cannot determine whether, or what portions of, the original statements or the later recants are true or false.

On June 11, 2008, Newsweek published an account of material from a "previously undisclosed CIA report written in the summer of 2002". The article reported that on August 7, 2002, CIA analysts had drafted a high-level report that expressed serious doubts about the information flowing from al-Libi's interrogation. The information that al-Libi acknowledged being a member of al-Qaeda's executive council was not supported by other sources. According to al-Libi, in Egypt he was locked in a tiny box less than 20 inches high and held for 17 hours and after being let out he was thrown to the floor and punched for 15 minutes. According to CIA operational cables, only then did he tell his "fabricated" story about al-Qaeda members being dispatched to Iraq.

== Book: Inside the Jihad ==
In November 2006, a Moroccan using the pseudonym Omar Nasiri, having infiltrated al-Qaeda in the 1990s, wrote the book, Inside the Jihad: My Life with al Qaeda, a Spy's story. In the book, Nasiri claims that al-Libi deliberately planted information to encourage the U.S. to invade Iraq. In an interview with BBC2's Newsnight, Nasiri said Libi "needed the conflict in Iraq because months before I heard him telling us when a question was asked in the mosque after the prayer in the evening, where is the best country to fight the jihad?" Nasiri said that Libi had identified Iraq as the "weakest" Muslim country. He suggested to Newsnight that al-Libi wanted to overthrow Saddam and use Iraq as a jihadist base. Nasiri describes al-Libi as one of the leaders at the Afghan camp, and characterizes him as "brilliant in every way." He said that learning how to withstand interrogations and supply false information was a key part of the training in the camps. Al-Libi "knew what his interrogators wanted, and he was happy to give it to them. He wanted to see Saddam toppled even more than the Americans did."

== Book: At the Center of the Storm ==
In April 2007, former Director of Central Intelligence George Tenet released his memoir titled At the Center of the Storm: My Years at the CIA. With regard to al-Libi, Tenet writes the following:

We believed that al-Libi was withholding critical threat information at the time, so we transferred him to a third country for further debriefing. Allegations were made that we did so knowing that he would be tortured, but this is false. The country in question understood and agreed that they would hold al-Libi for a limited period. In the course of questioning while he was in U.S. custody in Afghanistan, al-Libi made initial references to possible al-Qa'ida training in Iraq. He offered up information that a militant known as Abu Abdullah had told him that at least three times between 1997 and 2000, the now-deceased al-Qa'ida leader Mohammad Atef had sent Abu Abdullah to Iraq to seek training in poisons and mustard gas. Another senior al-Qa'ida detainee told us that Mohammad Atef was interested in expanding al-Qa-ida's ties to Iraq, which, in our eyes, added credibility to the reporting. Then, shortly after the Iraq war got under way, al-Libi recanted his story. Now, suddenly, he was saying that there was no such cooperative training. Inside the CIA, there was sharp division on his recantation. It led us to recall his reporting, and here is where the mystery begins. Al-Libi's story will no doubt be that he decided to fabricate in order to get better treatment and avoid harsh punishment. He clearly lied. We just don't know when. Did he lie when he first said that al-Qa'ida members received training in Iraq or did he lie when he said they did not? In my mind, either case might still be true. Perhaps, early on, he was under pressure, assumed his interrogators already knew the story, and sang away. After time passed and it became clear that he would not be harmed, he might have changed his story to butt the minds of his captors. Al-Qa'ida operatives are trained to do just that. A recantation would restore his stature as someone who had successfully confounded the enemy. The fact is, we don't know which story is true, and since we don't know, we can assume nothing.

== Repatriation to Libya and death ==
In 2006, the Bush administration announced that it was transferring high-value al-Qaeda detainees from CIA secret prisons so they could be put on trial by military commissions. However, the administration was conspicuously silent about al-Libi. In December 2014, it was revealed that he had been transferred to the Guantanamo Bay detention camp in 2003 and transferred to Morocco on March 27, 2004.

Noman Benotman, a former Mujahideen who knew Libi, told Newsweek that during a recent trip to Tripoli, he met with a senior Libyan government official who confirmed to him that Libi had been transferred to Libya and was being held in prison there. He was suffering from tuberculosis.

On May 10, 2009, the English language edition of the Algerian newspaper Ennahar reported that the Libyan government said that Al-Libi had been repatriated to Libyan custody in 2006, and had recently committed suicide by hanging. It attributed the information to the Libyan newspaper, Oea. Ennahar reported Al-Libi's real name was Ali Mohamed Abdul Aziz Al-Fakheri. It stated he was 46 years old, and had been allowed visits with international human rights workers from Human Rights Watch. The story was widely reported by other media outlets.

Al-Libi had been visited in April 2009 by a team from Human Rights Watch. His sudden death so soon after this visit has led human rights organisations and Islamic groups to question whether it was truly a suicide. Clive Stafford Smith, Legal Director of the UK branch of the human rights group Reprieve, said, "We are told that al-Libi committed suicide in his Libyan prison. If this is true it would be because of his torture and abuse. If false, it may reflect a desire to silence one of the greatest embarrassments to the Bush administration." Hafed Al-Ghwell, a Libya expert and director of communications at the Dubai campus of Harvard Kennedy School, commented:

This is a regime with a long history of killing people in jail and then claiming it was suicide. My guess is Libya has seen the winds of change in America and wanted to bury this man before international organisations start demanding access to him.

On June 19, 2009, Andy Worthington published new information on al-Libi's death. Worthington gave a detailed timeline of Al Libi's last years.

The head of the Washington office of Human Rights Watch said al-Libi was "Exhibit A" in hearings on the relationship between pre-Iraq War false intelligence and torture. Confirmation of al-Libi's location came two weeks prior to his death. An independent investigation of his death has been requested by Human Rights Watch.

On October 4, 2009, Reuters reported that Ayman Al Zawahiri, the head of al-Qaeda, had asserted that Libya had caused al-Libi's death through torture.

== See also ==
- Black site
- Ghost detainee
- Extraordinary rendition
- Taxi to the Dark Side

== External links and references ==
- Schmitt, Eric; Eric Eckholm (January 6, 2002). "U.S. Captures a Top Trainer for Al Qaeda". The New York Times. Archived from the original on October 16, 2015.
- Graham, Bradley; Walter Pincus (January 5, 2002). "Al Qaeda Trainer in U.S. Hands". The Washington Post. Archived from the original on October 25, 2012 – via HighBeam Research.
- Priest, Dana (August 1, 2004). "Al Qaeda-Iraq Link Recanted". The Washington Post. p. A20.
- Letter from DIA declassifying two paragraphs of DITSUM # 044-02, October 26, 2005
- "Smoking Gun on Manipulation of Iraq Intelligence? 'NY Times' Cites New Document". Editor & Publisher. November 5, 2005. Archived from the original (Subscription required) on May 19, 2009.
- Jehl, Douglas (November 5, 2005). "Report Warned Bush Team About Intelligence Suspicions". The New York Times.
- Isikoff, Michael; Mark Hosenball (November 10, 2005). "Al-Libi's Tall Tales". Newsweek. Archived from the original on November 26, 2005.
- Nimmo, Kurt (December 23, 2005). "CIA Patsy Spins Fairy Tale Plot to Assassinate Bush". Another Day in the Empire. Archived from the original on January 3, 2006.
- Duncan Gardham (May 11, 2009). "Al-Qaeda chief commits suicide in Libyan prison, report says". The Daily Telegraph. Archived from the original on May 14, 2009.
