= Imperial Hubris =

2004 book by Michael Scheuer

- Author: Michael Scheuer
- Language: English
- Publication date: 2004
- Publication place: United States
- ISBN: 1-57488-849-8

Imperial Hubris: Why the West is Losing the War on Terror (Brassey's, 2004; ISBN 1-57488-849-8) is a book by American author Michael Scheuer, a Central Intelligence Agency veteran. The book was originally published anonymously. Scheur worked 22 years with the CIA, and ran the Counterterrorist Center's bin Laden station from 1996 to 1999.

In the book, Scheuer criticized assumptions which were widespread among US civilian, military and intelligence officials regarding Islamist insurgencies and particularly Osama bin Laden. Scheuer contends that Al-Qaeda is following a martial strategy that is more rational than it is given credit for among Western politicians and media.

In his video of September 7th 2007, bin Laden says that "if you would like to get to know some of the reasons for your losing of your war against us, then read the book of Michael Scheuer in this regard."

== Reviews ==
Reviews, ranging from high praise to scathing criticism, are presented here in chronological order.

- Richard A. Clarke, Finally the CIA gets it right, The Washington Post, June 27, 2004
- Kakutani, Michiko (July 9, 2004). "A Dark View of U.S. Strategy". The New York Times.
- Follman, Mark (July 13, 2004). "A spook speaks out". Salon Magazine. Archived from the original on September 1, 2006.
- Faye Bowers, We have met the enemy and he is us, The Christian Science Monitor, July 13, 2004
- Benjamin Schwarz, A Review, The Atlantic, August 10, 2004
- James. H. Joyner, Jr., Book Review, Strategic Insights, vol. 3, no. 9, September 2004
- Jason Burke, Why do they hate us?, The Guardian, September 4, 2004
- Eric Margolis, Why West is losing, Toronto Sun, September 12, 2004
- Jeff Helmreich, Empirical Hubris, Jerusalem Issue Brief, vol. 4, no. 4, September 13, 2004
- David Frum, Uncertain Trumpet, National Review, November 16, 2004
- Michael Scheuer, An author reviews the reviews of his book, lewrockwell.com, February 7, 2005
- Thomas Joscelyn, CIA Conspiracy Theorist, The Weekly Standard, February 16, 2005
- Charles Glass, Cyber-Jihad, London Review of Books, vol. 28, no. 5, March 9, 2006
