= Omar Nasiri =

Belgian spy of Moroccan origin

Omar Nasiri (born 1960s) is the pseudonym of a Belgian spy of Moroccan origin who infiltrated al-Qaeda, attending training camps in Afghanistan and passing information to the UK and French external intelligence services, the DGSE. He claims in an exclusive interview presented on the BBC's Newsnight programme on 16 November 2006 that the UK intelligence services were warned in the mid-1990s about the threat posed by al-Qaeda, but failed to act quickly enough. He also claims that Ibn al-Shaykh al-Libi deliberately gave interrogators acting on behalf of the United States false information in order to encourage the USA to overthrow Saddam Hussein, thus allowing al-Qaeda to use Iraq as a jihadist base.

In his book, he claims to be deaf in his left ear due to an accident when he was younger, when he was using a Q-tip to clean his ears when his brothers, who were roughhousing on a bed next to him, fell on him and drove the Q-tip deep into his left ear. While this is heavily considered to be true, because his book mentions how "minor details have been edited or fabricated for protection of the author", it is unclear if he is deaf in his left ear instead of his right, or if this ever really happened.

== Introduction to Abdullah and Abdurahman Khadr ==
Nasiri's book Inside the Jihad: My Life with al Qaeda, a Spy's story contains Nasiri's account of meeting two boys he was to learn were sons of the Khadr family. Although he identified them as Abdurahman and Omar Khadr, the family has disputed his identification, stating that it was Abdullah and Abdurahman who were at the camp.

Nasiri states that, when he was attending the Khaldan training camp, ibn al-Shaykh al-Libi, the camp's director, introduced the two boys as "Hamza" and "Osama".

According to Nasiri the two boys constantly fought with one another. He said their fights were unlike those of normal brothers, and gave an account of an incident on the marksmanship range, where the two boys were yelling at one another, turned their guns on one another, and all the other people on the firing range thought they were going to open fire on one another.

Nasiri's account of Osama, the younger of the two sons, was that he was "almost hyperactive", and was constantly talking, bragging. According to Nasiri, he bragged about how important his father was, and offered Nasiri his first hint of Osama bin Laden's role in running the camp—telling him "the other Osama" paid for all the food consumed there.

Nasiri described the older son as much quieter, but he did tell about an incident, when he had been present in a public square, during the siege of Khowst, in 1991. A mortar shell landed in the square, but didn't go off. Nasiri said that the older son told him the Afghans were so desperate for money that a crowd started to try to dismantle the mortar shell, in order to sell the parts to the fighters. Nasiri said that he told him that everyone trying to dismantle the shell was killed in the explosion when one of the salvagers tried to get it open by hitting it with a hammer.

== Publications ==
He authored the following books:

- ISBN 978-1-85065-861-0 "Inside the Global Jihad: How I Infiltrated Al Qaeda and Was Abandoned by Western Intelligence"
- ISBN 978-0-465-02388-2 "Inside the Jihad: My Life with al Qaeda, a Spy's story"
