= Interrogation of Saddam Hussein =

Overview of interrogation, 2003–2004

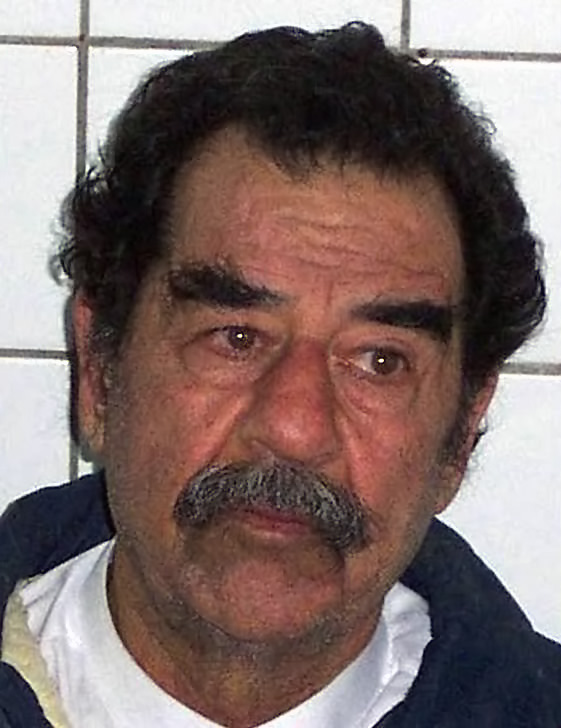
Saddam Hussein shortly after capture, after being shaved to confirm his identity

The interrogation of Saddam Hussein began shortly after his capture by U.S. forces in December 2003, while the deposed president of Iraq was held at the Camp Cropper detention facility at Baghdad International Airport. Beginning in February 2004, the interrogation program, codenamed Operation Desert Spider, was controlled by Federal Bureau of Investigation (FBI) agents. Standard FBI FD-302 forms filed at the time were declassified and released in 2009 under a U.S. Freedom of Information Act request filed by the National Security Archive. Saddam, identified as "High Value Detainee #1" in the documents, was the subject of 20 "formal interviews" followed by five "casual conversations." Questioning covered the span of Saddam's political career, from 2003 when he was found hiding in a "spider hole" on a farm near his home town of Tikrit, back to his role in a failed 1959 coup attempt in Iraq, after which he had taken refuge in the very same place, one report noted.

Detailed questioning covered the Iran–Iraq War and his use of chemical weapons against Iranians. Saddam denied repeated assertions by his interrogator of a current weapons of mass destruction capability in Iraq, yet had resisted UN weapons inspections because he "was more concerned about Iran discovering Iraq’s weaknesses and vulnerabilities than the repercussions of the United States for his refusal to allow U.N. inspectors back into Iraq," according to the reports. The former leader reportedly maintained that he did not collaborate with Al-Qaeda, as had been suggested by Bush administration officials in support of its policy of regime change in Iraq. Saddam said he feared Al-Qaeda would have turned on him, and was quoted calling Osama bin Laden a "zealot." The face-to-face sessions were conducted by George Piro, an FBI supervisory special agent (SSA), one of only a few FBI agents who spoke Arabic fluently. Saddam was led to believe that his interrogator was a high-ranking U.S. government official with direct access to U.S. President George W. Bush, when in reality he was in a relatively low-level position at the time. Piro discussed the interrogation process during an interview on the television news magazine 60 Minutes in January 2008. In an official statement, a senior FBI official in Piro’s chain of command characterized the perceived success of their interrogation of Saddam Hussein as one of the agency's top accomplishments in its 100-year history.

== Background ==
=== Historical ===
In 1957, at the age of 20, Saddam Hussein joined the nascent Ba'ath Party, which was founded on a socialist form of Pan-Arabism. After participating in an unsuccessful 1959 assassination attempt on then Prime Minister of Iraq Abd al-Karim Qasim, Saddam became a fugitive, and eventually fled to Syria and then Egypt. Following the Ba'athists overthrow of the prime minister in the February 1963 Iraqi coup d'état, and the counter-coup half a year later, Saddam was jailed in Iraq from 1964 to 1966. The Ba'ath Party returned to power after another successful coup in 1968. General Ahmed Hassan al-Bakr, a relative of Saddam Hussein, became president, and Saddam became his deputy. In 1979, Saddam Hussein displaced Bakr, and a little more than a year later, he ordered Iraqi troops to invade Iran, starting the Iran–Iraq War that would continue until 1988. Iraq's invasion of Kuwait in 1990 led to the 1991 Gulf War. In 1998, Saddam halted Iraqi cooperation with the United Nations Special Commission weapons inspections imposed on Iraq after the Gulf War, and kept UN inspectors out until 2002. In March 2003, the United States led an invasion of Iraq that quickly toppled the government. Saddam fled the capital Baghdad shortly before it fell in mid-April, and disappeared; he was finally captured on December 13 of that year by U.S. soldiers. Saddam remained in U.S. military custody throughout his subsequent criminal trial. On November 5, 2006, Saddam was found guilty of crimes against humanity, and was turned over to the Iraqi Interim Government for his execution by hanging just before the end of that year, on 30 December.

=== Controlling agency ===
When Saddam was initially questioned, he gave his U.S. Army Military Intelligence Corps interrogators only evasive or rhetorical answers. Control of his interrogation was soon transferred from the military intelligence interrogators, who are typically represented in the field by less experienced junior officers trained to obtain operational intelligence, over to the Central Intelligence Agency (CIA), because of their broader experience and capabilities. While Saddam's official status was initially undetermined pending legal review, the U.S. Defense Department announced that he was classified as a prisoner of war on January 9, 2004. After Saddam was declared a prisoner of war, he had to be repatriated to his home country of Iraq after cessation of hostilities, according to the International Red Cross, who monitors compliance with the Geneva Conventions. The U.S. government had also announced that it wanted to turn him over to a new Iraqi government for a public trial with international observers. The CIA realized early on that covert officers conducting the interrogations could end up being called as witnesses in a future court proceeding, and invited the FBI to take a more active role. Control of the interrogation was finally transferred to FBI agents, who are trained to interview suspects in preparation for prosecutions. The combined interrogation team was composed of CIA analysts and FBI agents, intelligence analysts, language specialists, and a behavioral profiler.

=== Interrogation methods ===
The FBI began documenting sessions they characterized as "formal interviews" beginning on February 7. There is little public information available on the interrogations prior to this date since the operations were secret, but one unnamed U.S. official described the process as "a chess game," because Saddam was facing a possible death sentence, and had little incentive to speak. Several experts speaking publicly at the time made similar assessments, and set low expectations for the information that could be obtained from Saddam. Although it was speculated that the CIA would employ multiple interrogators using good cop/bad cop role play, the FBI used a single primary interrogator, SSA George Piro, who built up a rapport with Saddam over time. Piro said that their bond became so strong that he saw Saddam tear up when they said goodbye for the last time.

Piro described how he seated Saddam with "his back against the wall" to reinforce that psychological impression, but denied using any of the enhanced interrogation techniques approved for use by the CIA, because he said it was against FBI policy, and would not have worked in this case. In a 2008 interview with 60 Minutes, he revealed details of how he took total control over the prisoner's situation to create a dependence that he would use to obtain cooperation. He also listened patiently as his subject gave his recollections and interpretation of historical events, appealing to Saddam's sense of self-importance to obtain information. Prisoner of war status placed certain constraints on the permissible interrogation techniques; for example, threats of punishment or offers of improved conditions in return for cooperation were prohibited, according to Ruth Wedgwood, an expert on the Geneva Conventions who is a professor at Johns Hopkins University.

== Notable quotations ==
Although the FBI reports were generally written in a narrative fashion, they occasionally provided direct quotations attributed to Saddam Hussein, translated from Arabic to English by the FBI. Some of these quotes were highlighted in secondary source accounts of the reports, including these (grouped by subject in rough chronological order):

=== Iran-Iraq War ===
- "Khomeini and Iran would have occupied all of the Arab world if it had not been for Iraq,"

=== Chemical weapons ===
- "If I had the [prohibited] weapons, would I have let United States forces stay in Kuwait without attacking?" referring to the Gulf War
- "My God, if I had such weapons, I would have used them in the fight against the U.S," referring to the 2003 Iraq War
- "I will not be cornered or caught on some technicality. It will not do you any good," in refusing to answer questions about use of chemical weapons in Iran and Iraq
- "I am not going to answer that, no matter how you put the question. I will discuss everything unless it hurts my people, my friends and the army."

=== Israel/Palestine ===
- "We accepted them as guests," referring to representatives of the Palestinian Liberation Front and the Abu Nidal Organization who were allowed entry to Iraq on the condition that they refrain from terrorism.
- "A solution that does not convince the majority of Palestinians will not be successful"
- "Every thing that happened to us was because of Israel. Israel pushes U.S. politicians and fills them with hatred," referring to his decision to launch Scud missiles against Israel during the Gulf War.

=== Iraq War rationale ===
- "The U.S. used the 9/11 attack as a justification to attack Iraq" and "lost sight of the cause of 9/11"
- "Osama Bin Laden's ideology was no different than the many zealots that came before him"
- "If you asked the American soldier, who came to Iraq to find weapons of mass destruction but none have been found, and who came to remove the leaders of the Saddam dictatorship who are now all in jail, whether he wanted to stay or go, he would say go."

=== Fugitive status ===
- "This is movie magic, not reality," laughing off his alleged use of look-alike body doubles for his personal security
- "We will struggle in secret," were his last words at the final meeting of senior Iraqi leadership, shortly before fleeing Baghdad in April 2003.

=== The interrogation ===
- "Do you think I would tell my enemy if I made a mistake?" referring to the U.S. system of government, not the interviewer
- "Perhaps a conversation between two such educated people will not be useful or successful," showing respect for Piro’s relative intelligence
- "I think the questions should be in the context of a dialogue, not an interrogation," in reference his questioning by Piro

== Disputed press reports ==
A number of press reports describe the Iraqi dictator admitting to a catastrophic miscalculation, having misled the United States into believing Iraq still possessed biological and chemical weapons. According to the Associated Press: "Saddam Hussein told an FBI interviewer before he was hanged that he allowed the world to believe he had weapons of mass destruction because he was worried about appearing weak to Iran".

This interpretation has been challenged by journalist Solomon Hughes, writing: "You might remember that we invaded Iraq because Saddam did have WMD, but was pretending he didn't. Now it turns out we invaded Iraq because Saddam did not have WMD, but pretended he did."

How did Saddam let the world believe Iraq had WMD by denying he had WMD? How does this story work? It doesn't, because the [Associated Press] report is false. FBI agent Pinto's actual record of a casual conversation with Saddam reads: "Even though Hussein claimed Iraq did not have WMD, the threat from Iran was a major factor as to why he did not allow the return of the UN inspectors. Hussein stated he was more concerned about Iran discovering Iraq's weaknesses and vulnerabilities than the repercussions of the United States for his refusal to allow UN inspectors back into Iraq." So in 1998 Saddam resisted the UN weapons inspectors because he did not want to look weak in front of Iran, with whom he had fought a vicious eight-year war. This is not the same as pretending to have WMD. Saddam did not want to look like he could be pushed around by the UN lest his neighbours scent weakness, but his government repeatedly—and accurately—denied having WMD.

== Chronology ==
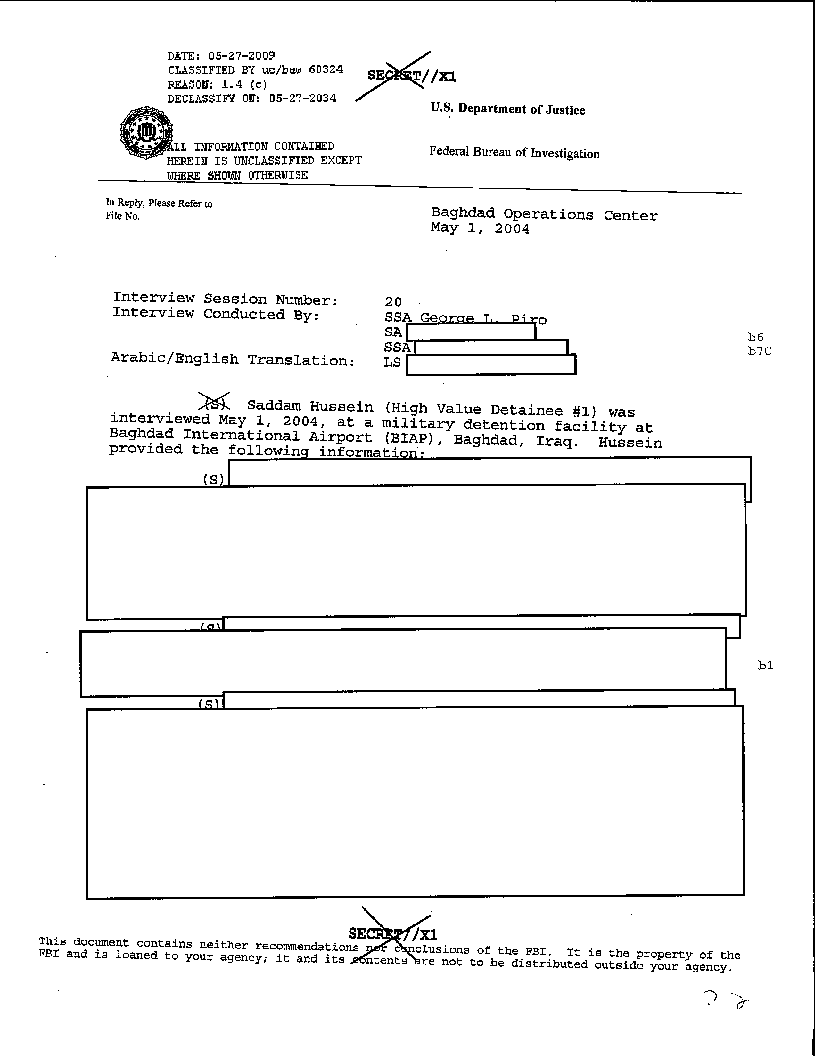
The 1 May 2004 report was almost completely redacted.

The chronology of the reported meetings between Piro and Saddam in 2004:

- Interview Session 1, 7 February
- Interview Session 2, 8 February
- Interview Session 3, 10 February
- Interview Session 4, 13 February
- Interview Session 5, 15 February
- Interview Session 6, 16 February
- Interview Session 7, 18 February
- Interview Session 8, 20 February
- Interview Session 9, 24 February
- Interview Session 10, 27 February
- Interview Session 11, 3 March
- Interview Session 12, 5 March
- Interview Session 13, 11 March
- Interview Session 14, 13 March
- Interview Session 15, 16 March
- Interview Session 16, 19 March
- Interview Session 17, 23 March
- Interview Session 18, 28 March
- Interview Session 19, 30 March
- Interview Session 20, 1 May
- Casual Conversation, 10 May
- Casual Conversation, 13 May
- Casual Conversation, 1 June
- Casual Conversation, 17 June
- Casual Conversation, 28 June

== See also ==
- February 2003 Saddam Hussein interview
- 2003 invasion of Iraq
- Trial of Saddam Hussein
- Execution of Saddam Hussein
