= George Piro =

FBI agent; Saddam Hussein's interrogator (born 1967)

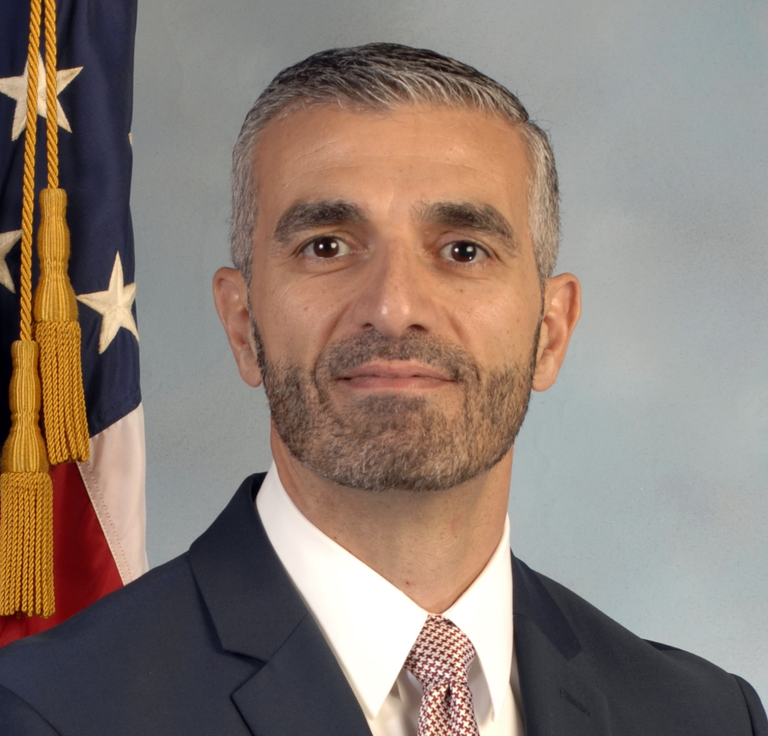
- Born: January 1, 1967 (age 59); Beirut, Lebanon
- Known for: Interrogation of Saddam Hussein

George Piro is an American former Federal Bureau of Investigation agent. He served as special agent in charge (SAC) at the FBI's Miami Field Office. He was the Team Leader and Lead Interrogator of the Saddam Hussein Interrogation Team in 2004.

== Early and personal life ==
Born and raised in Beirut, Lebanon of Assyrian heritage, Piro is the son of Mr. & Mrs. Lazar Piro who immigrated to Turlock, California during the Lebanese Civil War when he was 12 years old. Turlock is located in California's San Joaquin Valley, which has a large Assyrian-American population.

He speaks English, Arabic and Aramaic (Assyrian) fluently as well as French. He received his bachelor's degree in criminal justice from Chapman University and his master's degree in Arab studies from Georgetown University.

== Career ==
After he graduated from high school, Piro enlisted in the United States Air Force and served as a security policeman. After his service in the U.S. Air Force, he began his career in law enforcement with the City of Ceres Police Department in 1989. He went to night school to earn a college degree. Working his way up the ranks in the Ceres Police Department, Piro became a Criminal Investigator II for the Stanislaus County District Attorney's office, where he investigated felony cases involving career criminals and was assigned to the Stanislaus County Drug Enforcement Agency. In 1999, he began his career with the FBI and was assigned to the Phoenix Field Office.

=== Saddam Hussein interrogation ===
Piro's fluency in Arabic opened high-level opportunities for him during the Iraq War, at a time when approximately 1 in 1000 FBI special agents spoke the language. The television show 60 Minutes revealed in January 2008 that he had secretly gained the confidence of Saddam Hussein while interrogating him after the second war in Iraq. During his conversations with Hussein, Piro reported that Hussein had not expected a U.S. invasion of Iraq. Piro also confirmed through their discussions that Iraq did not have weapons of mass destruction at the time of the U.S. invasion in 2003, but that Hussein would not give up attempts to obtain them in order to secure his country from the perceived threat posed by Iran and its weapons program. Further, any links to Bin Laden and Al-Qaeda were denied, as Hussein held himself as a secular ruler and did not believe in the creation of an Islamic state. Hussein mocked Bin Laden saying "You really can't trust anybody with a beard like that".

On July 1, 2009, the National Security Archive declassified and released the official FBI FD-302 forms filed at the time of Saddam's interrogation, detailing 20 formal interviews and 5 casual conversations throughout 2004, much of which were between Piro and Saddam, including details of conversation and thoughts shared by Saddam himself.

=== Subsequent career ===
By 2007, Piro was serving as Supervisor of the FBI's Joint Terrorism Task Force in the Washington Field Office.

Piro was listed as being a Special Agent in Charge of the FBI Field Office in Miami in January 2017 when he served as the agency's spokesman concerning the FBI's investigation of the Fort Lauderdale airport shooting.

On October 18, 2017, FBI Director Christopher Wray announced the appointment of George Piro as the assistant director of the International Operations Division at FBI Headquarters in Washington, D.C.

On October 12, 2023, the Ultimate Fighting Championship, a mixed martial arts promotion, announced that Piro would be leading the company's anti-doping program.
