= Osama bin Laden =

Founder of al-Qaeda (1957–2011)

- أسامة بن لادن
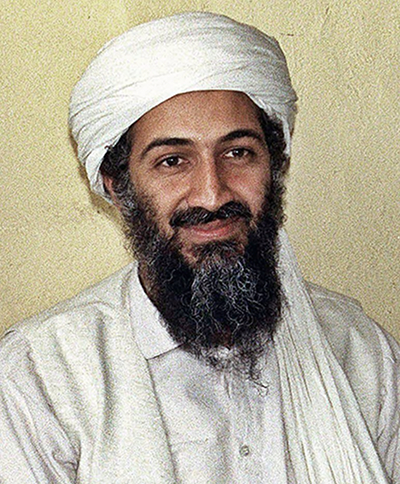
- bin Laden, c. 1997–1998

1st General Emir of al-Qaeda
- In office 11 August 1988 – 2 May 2011
- Preceded by: Position established
- Succeeded by: Ayman al-Zawahiri

Personal details
- Born: Osama bin Muhammad bin Awad bin Laden c. 1957–1958 Riyadh, (Note: Claimed by bin Laden and most sources, though U.S. and Interpol documents once listed it as Jeddah) Najd, Saudi Arabia
- Died: 2 May 2011 (aged 54) Abbottabad, Khyber Pakhtunkhwa, Pakistan
- Cause of death: Gunshot wounds
- Resting place: Buried in the Arabian Sea
- Citizenship: Saudi Arabia (until 1994); Stateless (from 1994)
- Spouse: 6 spouses: Najwa Ghanem (m. 1974; sep. 2001) Khadijah Sharif (m. 1983; div. 1990) Khairiah Sabir (m. 1985) Siham Sabir (m. 1987); Unknown woman (m., ann. 1996) Amal al-Sadah (m. 2000)
- Children: 24
- Parents: Muhammad bin Ladin (father); Hamida al-Attas (mother)
- Relatives: Bin Laden family
- Education: Al-Thager Model School; King Abdulaziz University
- Religion: Sunni Islam
- Jurisprudence: Hanbali

Military service
- Allegiance: Maktab al-Khidamat (1984 – c. 1988); al-Qaeda (1988–2011)
- Years of service: 1984–2011
- Battles/wars: List: Directly commanded in listed battles; Moro conflict; Soviet–Afghan War; Battle of Jaji (WIA); Second Sudanese Civil War; Afghan Civil War (1989–1992); Battle of Jalalabad (WIA); Afghan Civil War (1992–1996); Tajikistani Civil War; Algerian Civil War; Bosnian War; Afghan Civil War (1996–2001); Kosovo War; Al-Qaeda insurgency in Yemen; War on terror; War in Afghanistan (2001–2021); Battle of Tora Bora; Insurgency in the Maghreb (2002–present); Iraq War; Insurgency in Balochistan; Insurgency in Khyber Pakhtunkhwa; Houthi insurgency; War in Somalia (2006–2009); South Yemen insurgency; Insurgency in the North Caucasus; Operation Neptune Spear †

Osama bin Laden (Note: Pronounced /oʊˈsɑːmə bɪn ˈlɑːdən/ oh-SAH-mə bin LAH-dən; Arabic: أسامة بن لادن; also romanized as Usama bin Ladin.) (c. 1957/1958 – 2 May 2011) (Note: U.S. President Barack Obama announced his death at 11:35 p.m. on 1 May 2011 EST (8:35 a.m. on 2 May 2011 PKT), and bin Laden was killed at 3:39 p.m. on 1 May 2011 EST (12:39 a.m. on 2 May 2011 PKT).) was the founder and first general emir of al-Qaeda, a Salafi jihadist militant organization, from 1988 until his killing in 2011. He helped orchestrate al-Qaeda's terrorist attacks against the United States on 11 September 2001, which directly killed 2,977 victims and caused the U.S.-led global war on terror. Bin Laden also led al-Qaeda and its allies in the Second Afghan Civil War (1992–1996), Bosnian War (1992–1995), and Algerian Civil War (1992–2002), the latter of which he helped instigate.

Born into the wealthy bin Laden family in Saudi Arabia, bin Laden used his personal fortune to build a network that trained militants in Europe, West Asia, and Africa. He moved from Saudi Arabia to Afghanistan during the Soviet–Afghan War (1979–1989) to help Afghan Muslims resist the Soviet Union's occupation of the country. In 1984, he co-founded Maktab al-Khidamat to recruit foreigners into the Afghan mujahideen resistance. In 1988, he founded al-Qaeda. Following the Soviet withdrawal, he commanded a mujahideen force during the First Afghan Civil War (1989–1992).

Upon returning to Saudi Arabia, bin Laden publicly promoted anti-Western causes and opposed the Saudi royal family, leading to his expulsion from the country in 1991. He went back to Afghanistan, then moved to Sudan later that year. In 1993, al-Qaeda bombed the World Trade Center complex in New York City. In 1996, bin Laden returned to Afghanistan after being expelled from Sudan; Afghanistan came under Taliban control later that year. Al-Qaeda allied with the Taliban, and they collaborated in the Third Afghan Civil War (1996–2001). In 1996 and 1998, bin Laden declared holy war on all Americans. Al-Qaeda bombed U.S. embassies in East Africa in 1998, and the U.S. and United Nations officially declared bin Laden a terrorist. That year, al-Qaeda also began an ongoing insurgency in Yemen.

The 9/11 attacks were planned primarily by bin Laden and Khalid Sheikh Mohammed, and certain intelligence sources allege they were aided by Saudi Arabia, despite bin Laden's prior expulsion. Nineteen al-Qaeda members hijacked four American passenger planes, intending to crash them into U.S. landmarks. American Airlines Flight 77 hit the Pentagon in Virginia, United Airlines Flight 93 crashed in a field in Pennsylvania before reaching the hijackers' unknown target in Washington, D.C., and the World Trade Center towers collapsed after being struck by American Airlines Flight 11 and United Airlines Flight 175. An estimated 25,000 injuries, as well as 5,000 deaths from inhalation exposure, have been attributed to the attacks.

After 9/11, many nations passed stringent anti-terrorism legislation, while an international manhunt for bin Laden began. The U.S. invaded Afghanistan, deposed the Taliban, and forced bin Laden to relocate to Pakistan sometime before February 2002. He purchased land in Abbottabad to construct a new compound, which he moved into in 2005. Al-Qaeda fought the U.S. and its allies in the war in Afghanistan (2001–2021) and the Iraq War (2003–2011), while continuing to enact major terrorist attacks worldwide. By 2009, U.S. intelligence considered bin Laden relegated to being al-Qaeda's "ideological figurehead", with Ayman al-Zawahiri instead acting as "strategic commander". In 2010, U.S. intelligence discovered the Abbottabad compound, and in 2011, bin Laden was killed inside it during a raid by U.S. Navy SEALs codenamed Operation Neptune Spear. Al-Zawahiri succeeded him as al-Qaeda's emir.

Polls show that Muslims at large have a negative view of bin Laden, while many Islamists consider him heroic. Elsewhere, he is overwhelmingly seen as a symbol of terrorism and mass murder.

== Name and terms ==
Bin Laden's name is most commonly romanized from Arabic as Osama bin Laden, but can also be spelled with the names Usama and bin Ladin. Generally, during his life, U.S. intelligence internally referred to him as Usama bin Laden, and used the initialism 'UBL'.

He was named after Usama ibn Zayd, one of the companions of Muhammad; Usama means 'lion'. Bin, also spelled ibn, means 'son of'; bin Laden's full name, as spelled here, is Osama bin Muhammad bin 'Awad bin Laden—Osama, son of Muhammad, son of Awad, son of Laden. Muhammad, his father, is spelled here as Muhammad bin Ladin.

The Arabic linguistic convention would be to refer to Osama as 'Osama', 'Osama bin Laden', or similar romanizations, not bin Laden alone, as bin Laden is a patronymic surname, not a surname in the Western manner. In the West, he is nonetheless nicknamed bin Laden, which often begins sentences about him ("Bin Laden was..."), even though at the start of a sentence, ibn would be more accurate to Arabic ("Ibn Laden was...").

Bin Laden also went by Osama bin Muhammad bin Laden; Sheikh Osama bin Laden; Mujahid Sheikh; the Prince; the Emir; Hajj; the Director; and Abu Abdallah. Sheikh (or shaykh) and emir are Islamic titles for a government or military leader. A mujahid, plural mujahideen, is a participant in jihad—struggle in the name of Islam (peaceful or violent). Hajj is the traditional pilgrimage of Muslims to the holy city of Mecca. Abu Abdallah is a kunya, a parent's name based on their child's; Abu means 'father of', and Abdallah is his son.

== Early life ==
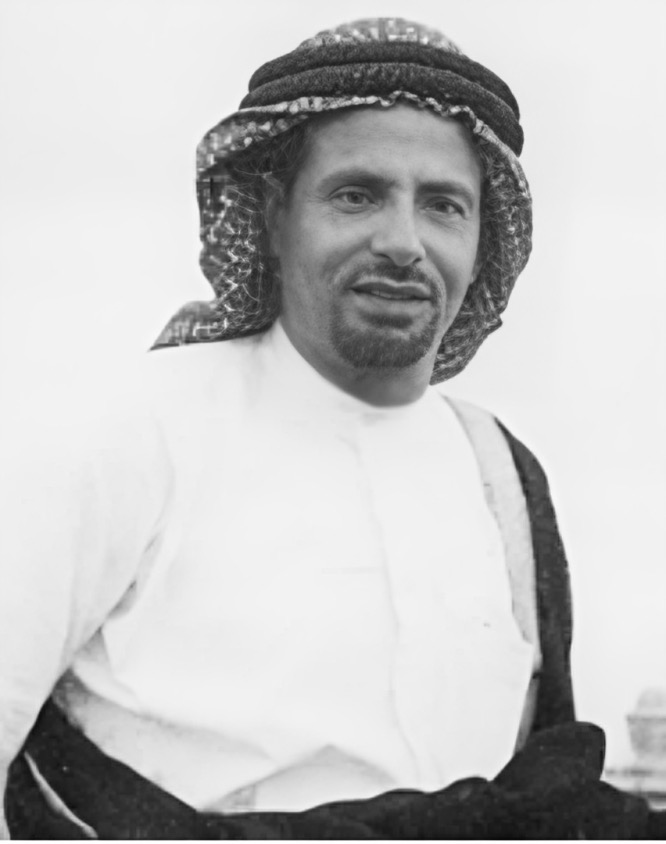
Muhammad bin Ladin, Osama's father

Osama bin Laden's exact date of birth is unknown. In a 1998 interview, he reportedly gave 10 March 1957 as his date of birth. However, this date did not appear in the transcript of the interview. Saudi men of his generation generally did not know their exact dates of birth because birthdays were not celebrated. The authorities arbitrarily assigned the same date of birth to many men in passports and other official documents. In a 1991 interview, bin Laden gave the month of Rajab in the Islamic year 1377, which could be 1957 or 1958. His first wife, Najwa, gave 15 February 1957 as his date of birth. Researchers generally agree that his birthplace was Riyadh, the city he identified as his birthplace, though FBI and Interpol documents once listed it as Jeddah.

Osama's father Muhammad was born in modern Yemen and his mother, Hamida al-Attas (born A'alia Ghanem), was born in Syria. Muhammad was married 22 times and al-Attas was his tenth wife. Osama was the 17th of Muhammad's approximately 52 children, and the only one by his union to al-Attas.

The bin Laden family originated in Yemen, and in the early 20th century, Muhammad bin Ladin moved to Saudi Arabia. He founded the Saudi Binladin Group in 1931, and by the 1950s became immensely wealthy through his connection to the Saudi royal family, the House of Saud. The royals gave the Saudi Binladin Group the exclusive right to construct religious buildings in Saudi Arabia, and later, the company became the royal family's official construction contractor. Muhammad's sons attended the same schools as the royal children.

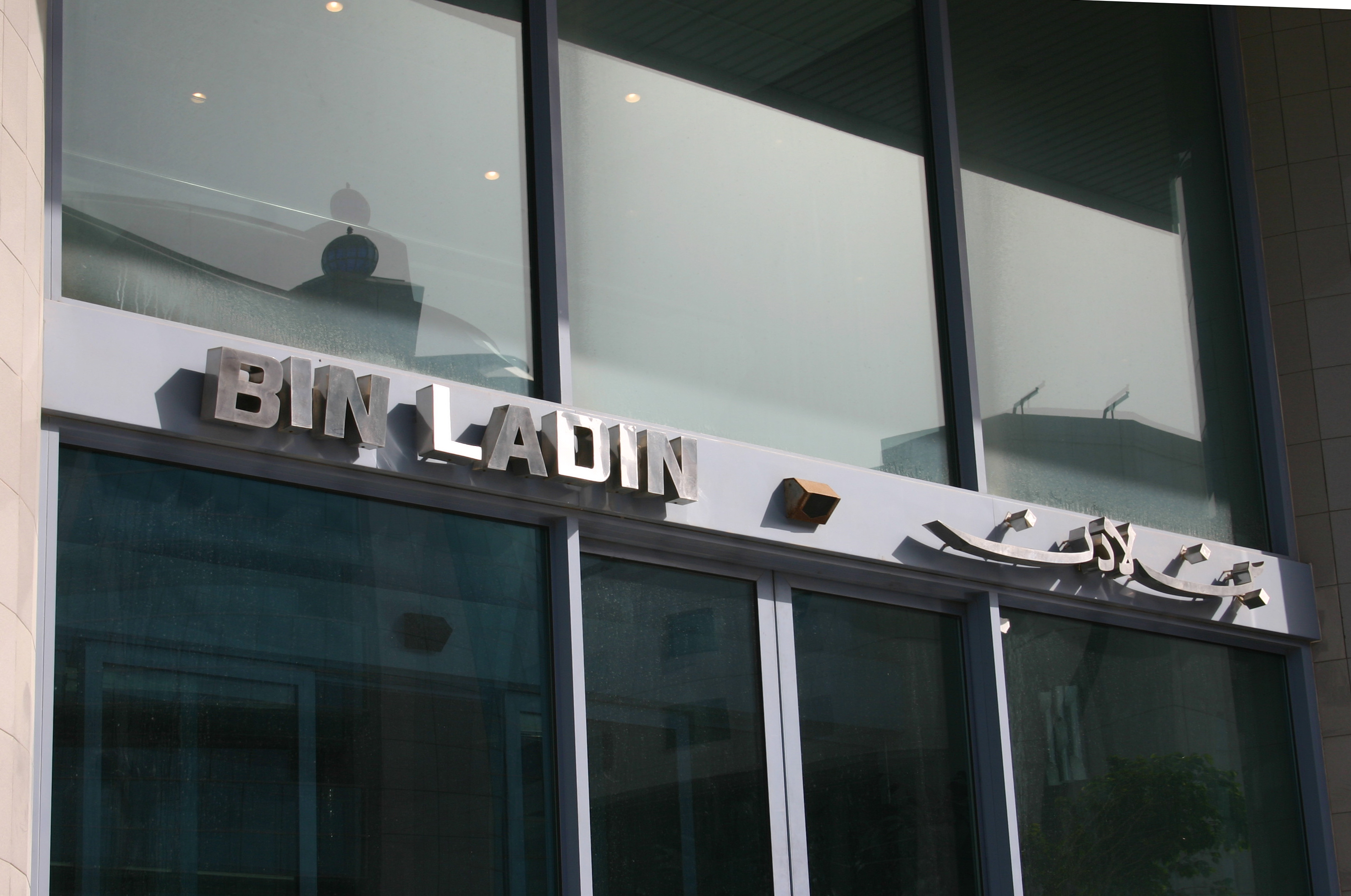
Entrance to the Dubai headquarters of the Saudi Binladin Group

Six months after Osama was born, he and his parents moved to the Saudi region of Hejaz and divorced afterward in 1960. He lived in Hejaz until adulthood. In the early 1960s, his mother married Mohammed al-Attas, an employee of the Saudi Binladin Group. The two had four children, and raised them alongside Osama. Muhammad bin Ladin died in 1967. (Note: Notably, he was killed in an airplane crash, and in 1988, Osama's brother Salem bin Laden died the same way. The bin Laden family were also the first private Saudis to own airplanes. Historian Steve Coll speculated that the family's history with airplanes inspired Osama's later use of them for terrorism.) Osama's inheritance was estimated in 2000 at about $300 million and in 2001 at $50–60 million, not adjusting for inflation. As of 2026, the bin Laden family still owns the Saudi Binladin Group, and still has ties to the House of Saud.

From 1968 to 1976, Osama attended the prestigious Al-Thager Model School in Jeddah, and then an English-language course in Oxford, England, in 1971. Decades later, he said that when he had been asked in 1972 to continue his studies in England, he refused on the grounds that "a pious Muslim should not go to the lands of the West. I had the impression that they were people of loose morals." He said that in general, the British were "morally degenerate". (Note: In September 1971, Osama's older brother Salem organized a family trip to Falun in Sweden. During the trip, local reporter Hans Lindquist interviewed the family at the Hotel Astoria for the regional Swedish newspaper Falu Kuriren. A prominent photograph from the visit showing 21 members of the family posing in front of a pink Cadillac gained widespread international media attention following the September 11 attacks. One of the boys in the photograph would be routinely identified in media accounts as Osama but family members said he did not travel to Sweden with the group.)

In the late 1970s, he started studying economics and business administration at King Abdulaziz University in Jeddah. One source claims that bin Laden left university during his third year without attaining a degree. Others say that he either earned a degree in civil engineering in 1979, or in public administration in 1981. In university, bin Laden's main interest was Islam. He studied the Quran and jihad, and did charity work.

== Religious and political views ==
Bin Laden was reportedly an avid reader, and often quoted Bernard Montgomery and Charles de Gaulle. He was raised into Sunni Islam, and subscribed to the Athari school of Islamic theology which interprets the Quran literally, rather than figuratively. For religious reasons, he was against gambling, homosexuality, intoxicants, masturbation, music, premarital sex, and usury. He once wrote a letter to the American public (released posthumously) urging them to work with then-United States president Barack Obama's administration to prevent further climate change, and "save humanity" from the greenhouse gas emissions "that threaten its destiny".

=== The Islamic world and systems of government ===
Western sources consider bin Laden an Islamic extremist. The German intelligence agency BfV writes:

"Islamist extremism [believes that] Islam is not only a personal or private affair, but that it should also rule social life and the political order or regulate at least part of it. This is in clear contradiction to the principles of the sovereignty of the people, the separation of state and religion, freedom of expression and general equal rights."

Percentage of Muslims by country in 2014

The latter secularist ideas were adopted by much of the Islamic world over the 20th century. Thus, strict adherence to Islamic morality-based social rules, like those of Sharia (Islamic law), declined among Muslims. Islamic fundamentalists decried these liberalizing trends. In university, bin Laden read the works of multiple Islamists, including Abdullah Yusuf Azzam, his then-teacher; Sayyid Qutb; and several Muslim Brotherhood leaders.

The leading interpretations of Islam in Saudi Arabia are Salafism and Wahhabism, although most Saudis do not refer to themselves Wahhabi. While bin Laden has been labeled a "Wahhabi", some researchers dispute the characterization. Wahhabi ideology, including the holiness of violence against non-Salafis, was taught directly to bin Laden and other students in Saudi schools from around the 1970s to 2010s.

Bin Laden promoted Islamism through his militant organization al-Qaeda, which has committed numerous terrorist attacks worldwide. Its attacks against the U.S. on 11 September 2001 led the "threat of militant Islamic terrorism [to take] center stage" in Middle Eastern politics. While bin Laden led al-Qaeda, it organized ideology classes that listed four principal enemies of Islam: Shia Islam, heretics of Islam, the U.S., and Israel. Bin Laden believed the Islamic world was in crisis due to being influenced by these enemies, and that only the complete restoration of Sharia within that world would correct it. He rejected other types of government as possible solutions to this perceived crisis, such as pan-Arabist, socialist, communist, and democratic systems.

He once denounced democracy as a "religion of ignorance" that violates Islam by issuing man-made laws, instead of those made by God; journalist Max Rodenbeck wrote that bin Laden avoided "theological justifications for democracy, [which are] based on the notion that the will of the people must necessarily reflect the will of an all-knowing God." Bin Laden also once favorably compared Spain's democratic system to certain non-democracies in the Muslim world, praising both as allowing for their rulers to be held accountable by the law.

=== Attacking the United States ===
Bin Laden did not unambiguously take responsibility for 9/11 until a 2004 video, but implied his motives for the attacks before then. His views on the U.S. were detailed in two fatwas (non-binding rulings on Sharia matters) that he issued in 1996 and 1998, in both of which he declared war on the U.S.; his 1998 interview with American journalist John Miller; a video released in December 2001; his 2002 Letter to the American People; and his 2004 video, among other statements.

Bin Laden took the indefinite stationing of Christian and Jewish American troops in Saudi Arabia during Operation Southern Watch (1992–2003) as a provocation towards all Muslims, given that he interpreted Muhammad as having banned the "permanent presence of infidels in Arabia". This was the principal motivation behind the 1996 fatwa. Bin Laden also wanted to respond to U.S. policies in the Middle East he considered oppressive, especially those that resulted in killings, particularly of women and children; he condemned America's funding and arming of Israel, the establishment of Israel, and the displacement and ethnic cleansing of Muslims in Palestine. He believed violent jihad was needed to right these actions. In his 2001 video, he said:

"It has become clear that the West in general and America in particular have an unspeakable hatred for Islam. [...] It is the hatred of crusaders. Terrorism against America deserves to be praised because it was a response to injustice, aimed at forcing America to stop its support for Israel, which kills our people."

He believed that the U.S. and United Kingdom were being directed by Israel to kill as many Muslims as possible. He alleged that Israel, having already invaded and occupied multiple Muslim-majority countries, was striving towards a "Greater Israel" by annexing the whole Middle East and then enslaving the annexed population. In his 2002 letter, he described the 1948 formation of the State of Israel as "a crime which must be erased".

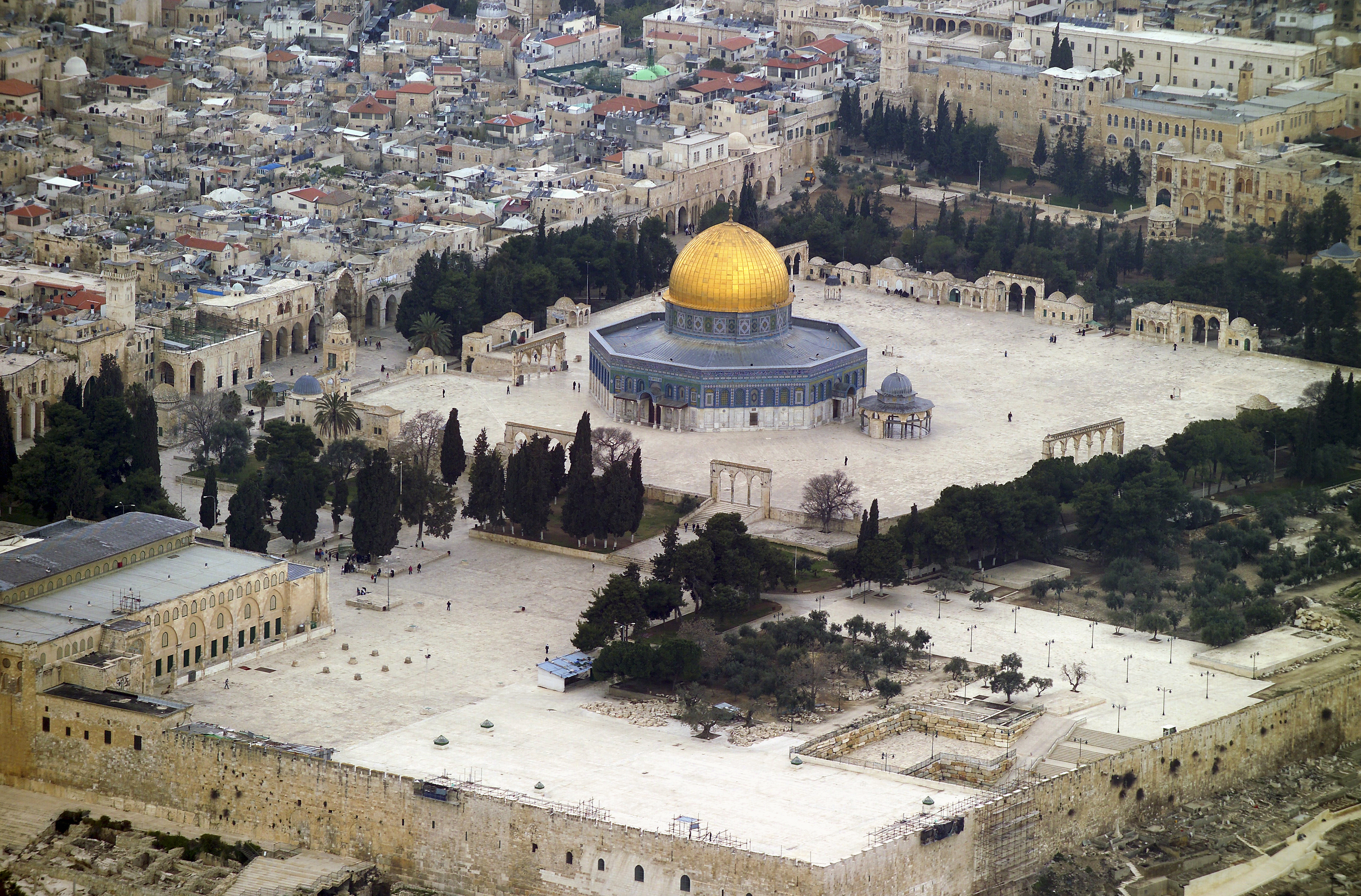
Al-Aqsa in East Jerusalem

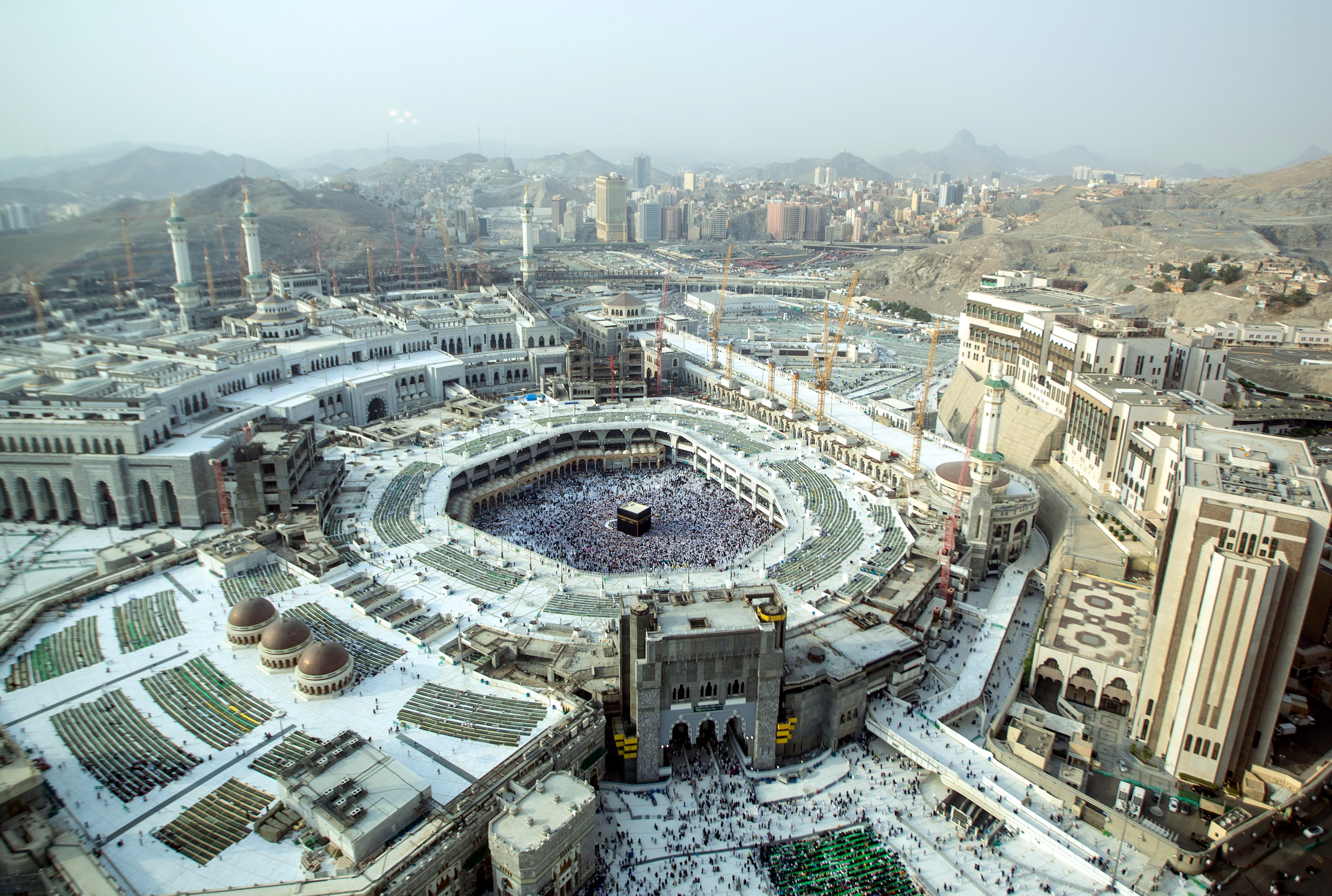
Masjid al-Haram in Mecca

In his 1998 fatwa, bin Laden claimed the duty of every Muslim was to "liberate" two Islamic holy sites "from their [America's and Israel's] grip": Al-Aqsa in East Jerusalem, and Masjid al-Haram in Mecca; West Jerusalem has been controlled by Israel since 1948, while East Jerusalem was controlled by Jordan from 1948 until 1967, when an ongoing Israeli occupation of the West Bank began during the Six-Day War.

The fatwa also condemned the concurrent international sanctions against Iraq, which the U.S. participated in. Lasting from 1990 to 2003, the sanctions completely isolated the Iraqi economy and caused near-total GDP collapse, creating a humanitarian crisis. Bin Laden often referenced the resulting child deaths, which according to scholar David Cortright numbered at least ~227,000 by 1999. Later surveys have disputed that estimate, concluding there was "no major rise in child mortality in Iraq [during] the sanctions."

In his 2002 letter, bin Laden implied multiple motives for 9/11, including U.S. support of 1) Israel, against Lebanon during the Israeli occupation of Southern Lebanon (1982–2000), and against Palestinians during the Second Intifada (2000–2005); 2) Russia, against Muslim militants in the Second Chechen War (1999–2009), and 3) India's oppression of Muslims in Kashmir. He also listed the U.S.-led intervention against Muslim militants in Somalia (1992–1993); pollution caused by the U.S.; and the U.S.'s refusal to ratify the Kyoto Protocol, which focused on reducing greenhouse gas emissions. Additionally, he called upon Americans to convert to Islam.

Before 9/11, bin Laden believed that sending a message to the U.S. through al-Qaeda's attacks could ultimately deter the U.S. military from targeting Muslims in the future. After 9/11, when the U.S. declared its global 'war on terror' and began hunting al-Qaeda members in Afghanistan and other Muslim countries, bin Laden tried to lure the U.S. military into long wars of attrition in those places by attracting large numbers of jihadists that would never surrender. He predicted this would lead to the economic collapse of the U.S. by "bleeding America to the point of bankruptcy". He noted in 2004 that this was essentially how his soldiers had helped force the Soviet Union to withdraw from Afghanistan at the end of the Soviet–Afghan War (1979–1989). Similar to what bin Laden intended, the U.S.' war in Afghanistan lasted for 20 years.

==== Attacking civilians on 9/11 ====
In his 1996 fatwa, bin Laden mentioned that his war against the U.S. would "not differentiate between [Americans] dressed in military uniforms, and civilians; they are all targets of this fatwa". In his 1998 interview, he said:

"American history does not distinguish between civilians and military, not even women and children. They are the ones who used [a nuclear bomb] against Nagasaki. Can these bombs distinguish between infants and military? America does not have a religion that will prevent it from destroying all people."

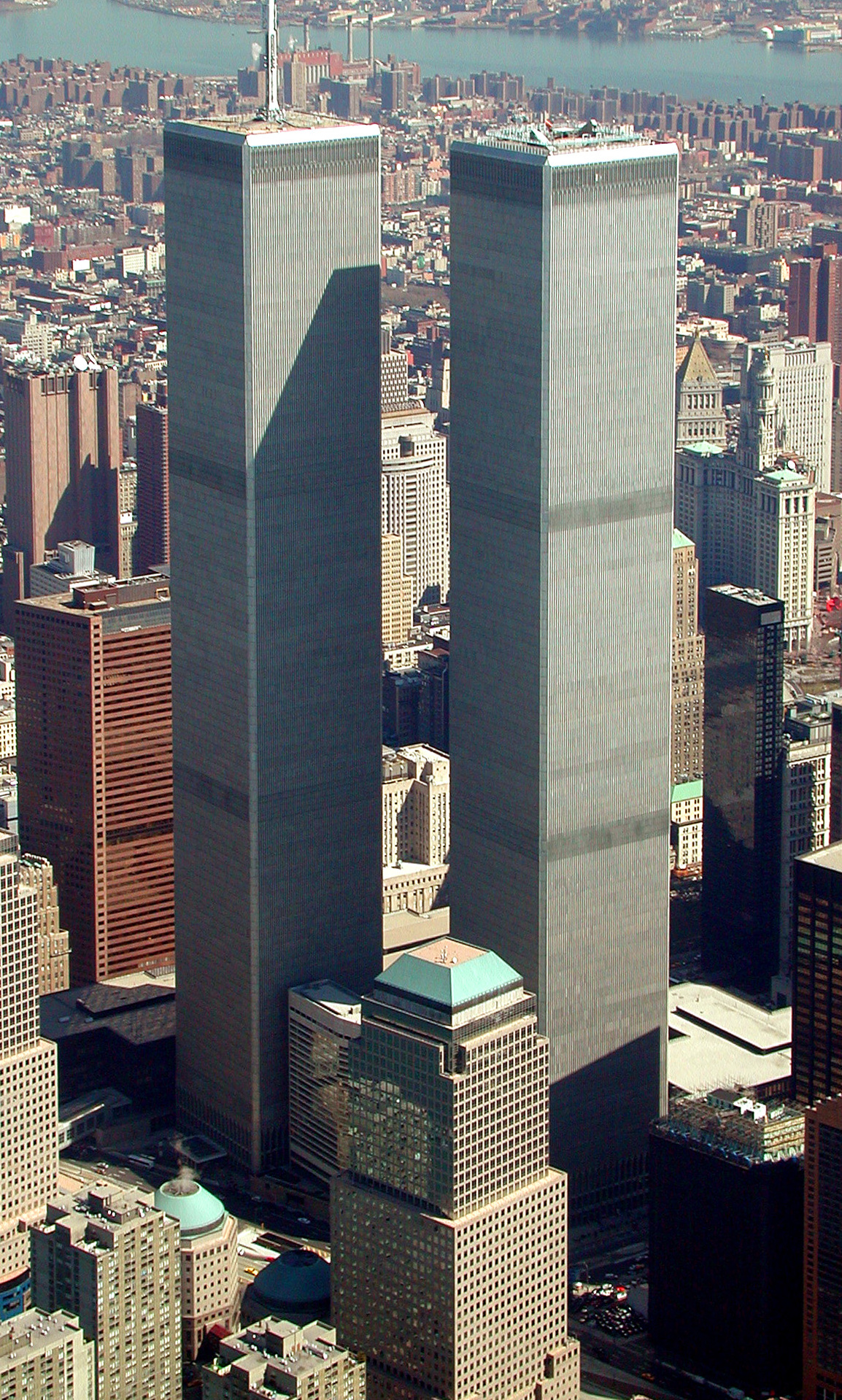
1 and 2 World Trade Center (left and right, respectively) in the original World Trade Center complex in New York City

Bin Laden believed that all Americans, even civilians, are responsible for the U.S.'s actions, as the country is a democracy, and because Americans pay taxes that fund their military. In contrast, he once stated that American democracy was "the law of the rich and wealthy".

After 9/11, bin Laden claimed that the women and children who died in the attacks were not al-Qaeda's intended targets, saying Muhammad condemned the killing of women and children; instead, "the main targets were the symbol of the United States: their economic and military power". In 2004, bin Laden said he was inspired to target the World Trade Center's Twin Towers as revenge for the destruction of towers in Beirut by U.S.-backed Israeli troops in the Siege of Beirut, during the 1982 Lebanon War:

"God knows it did not cross our minds to attack the towers [at first], but after [witnessing] the destroyed towers in Lebanon, it occurred to me punish the unjust the same way: to destroy towers in America, so it could taste some of what we are tasting, and to stop killing our children and women."

=== Judaism ===
Bin Laden was heavily anti-Semitic. He stated that most of the negative events that occurred in the world were the direct result of Jewish actions, and that Jews and Muslims could never coexist, as war was "inevitable" between them. In his 2002 letter, he stated that Jews controlled American media outlets, politics, and economic institutions. The U.S.'s and U.K.'s governments were also alleged to be under their control, and he claimed Operation Desert Fox—the two countries' 1998 bombing of Iraq—was proof of this. Bin Laden once described the Jews in this supposed conspiracy as "masters of usury [and] treachery, [who] will leave you nothing, either in this world or the next." He said in his 1998 interview:

"So we tell the Americans as people, [...] that if they value their lives and the lives of their children, to find a nationalistic government that will look after their interests and not the interests of the Jews."

=== Deaths of Muslim civilians ===
Hukm al-tatarrus (حكم التترس; 'the law on the use of human shields') is an obscure, albeit religiously legitimate Islamic concept which denies, in certain circumstances, that Muslims engaged in war whose actions unintentionally caused civilian deaths had acted immorally. In 2010, bin Laden wrote a letter criticizing followers of his, such as al-Qaeda's ally, Tehrik-i-Taliban Pakistan, who had interpreted al-tatarrus to justify routine massacres of Muslim civilians, which had turned away many Muslims previously supportive of Islamist jihadism. He then created a code of conduct constraining his allies' military activities to avoid civilian deaths, and instructed his global followers to focus on persuading hesitant Islamic political parties to follow Islamist jihadism, instead of fighting them. He urged his allies in Yemen to negotiate an end to their conflict with other Muslims, or at least demonstrate peaceful intentions to Yemeni Muslims, and he urged his allies in the Somali group al-Shabaab (an al-Qaeda affiliate after 2012) to pursue economic development and reduce Somalia's extreme poverty caused by constant warfare there.

== Militant and political career, 1979–2001 ==
=== Soviet–Afghan War ===
In 1979, Muslim-majority Afghanistan was occupied by the mostly non-Muslim Soviet Union; as socialists, the Soviets were backing the Democratic Republic of Afghanistan, a socialist national government which had been installed in a military coup in 1978 to the opposition of many Afghan Muslims. Leaving college, bin Laden went to Pakistan with Abdullah Yusuf Azzam to help the Afghan mujahideen resist against the Soviets. Bin Laden later recalled: "I felt outraged that an injustice had been committed against the people of Afghanistan." He likely moved there with the knowledge and support of the Saudi government, which opposed the Soviet occupation.

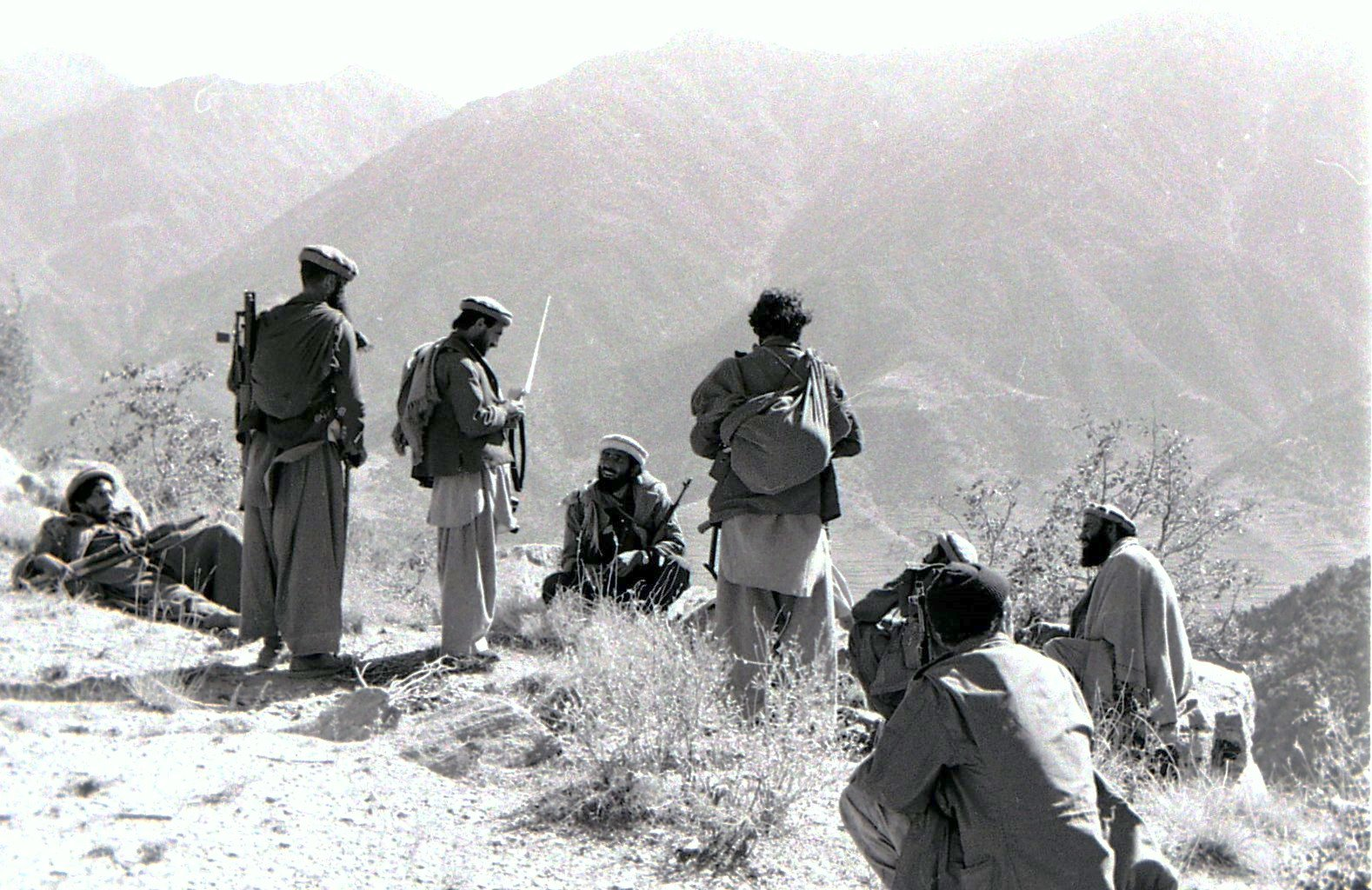
Afghan mujahideen forces in Kunar Province in 1987

In 1984, bin Laden and Azzam founded Maktab al-Khidamat (MaK), which recruited fighters from across the Arab world into the Afghan mujahideen, while funneling those fighters arms and money; this included paying for their flights or other modes of travel to the country. Bin Laden funded MaK with his inheritance of his family's fortune. During the war, he also helped build cave complexes in the Afghan mountains for mujahideen to use as fortifications. He moved to Afghanistan construction machinery that had been used by the Saudi Binladin Group. Furthermore, he established militant camps in Pakistan's Khyber Pakhtunkhwa province.

==== Bin Laden's collaborators in the war ====
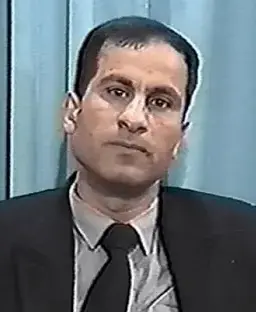
Ali Mohamed in 1989

From 1979 to 1992, the U.S. (via the CIA's Operation Cyclone program), Saudi Arabia, and China provided between $6–12 billion USD worth of financial aid and weapons to tens of thousands of Afghan mujahideen fighters through Pakistan's Inter-Services Intelligence (ISI). Although the U.S. provided money and weapons, the fighters' training was entirely done by the ISI and the Pakistan Armed Forces. Contrary to popular belief, the U.S. did not train or fund bin Laden's fighters directly, as according to Mohammad Yousaf, then-head of ISI's Afghanistan operations, Pakistan had a strict policy to prevent any American funding, arming, or training of mujahideen. However, bin Laden himself was trained by former U.S. Special Forces commando and double agent Ali Mohamed in the early 1990s.

In this period, bin Laden became acquainted with Hamid Gul, a Pakistani general and head of the ISI. According to some CIA officers, beginning in early 1980, bin Laden also acted as a liaison between the Saudi General Intelligence Presidency (GIP) and Afghan mujahideen warlords. Journalist Steve Coll states that while bin Laden was likely not a salaried GIP agent, "it seems clear [that they] did have a substantial relationship."

Between 1986 and 1987, bin Laden set up a base in eastern Afghanistan for several dozen of his own soldiers. There, he commanded them to victory against the Soviets at the 1987 Battle of Jaji. Despite the battle's little significance to the mujahideen war effort, it was lionized in the Arab press. It was around this time that bin Laden became idolized by many Arabs.

==== Soviet withdrawal and the founding of al-Qaeda ====
Bin Laden split from MaK by 1988. This was largely due to him wanting the Arab fighters in the Afghan mujahideen to form a military force independent from the rest of the mujahideen, whereas Azzam wanted to integrate the groups.

The jihadist flag, used by al-Qaeda and many of its affiliates

The Soviets began withdrawing from Afghanistan in May 1988, and al-Qaeda formed sometime that year. It may have been founded at an 11 August meeting between bin Laden, Azzam, and leaders of the Egyptian Islamic Jihad (EIJ) terrorist group, where the parties are known to have agreed on combining bin Laden's money with the EIJ's experience to move the jihadist cause out of Afghanistan after the withdrawal finished. On 20 August, notes were taken on a meeting involving bin Laden that mention "an organized Islamic faction, [whose] goal is to lift the word of God, to make his religion victorious." To keep its existence a secret, al-Qaeda did not state its name in its early public announcements.

Another topic which bin Laden and Azzam disagreed on was the use of MaK's military force following the withdrawal. They both wanted to use the force MaK had built to defend any oppressed Muslims around the world. Bin Laden then publicly urged the soldiers to wage jihad through terrorism; Azzam issued a fatwa condemning this approach, saying Islamic law condemns the killing of women and children.

The Soviets finished withdrawing in February 1989. The Democratic Republic government, now lacking physical Soviet protection, fought a war from 1988 to 1992 against continuing mujahideen resistance. Concurrently, various anti-Republic mujahideen groups waged internecine combat against each other, which angered bin Laden; in the new war, he stayed working with the GIP and ISI, while they continued to arm those and other Afghan mujahideen groups. In March 1989, bin Laden commanded 800 Arab foreign fighters against the Republic during the Battle of Jalalabad. He moved his men to immobilize the Republic's 7th Sarandoy Regiment, but this caused massive casualties on his side, who lost the battle.

=== Alleged involvement in the 1988 Gilgit massacre ===
In May 1988, large numbers of Shia civilians in and around Gilgit, Pakistan were massacred and raped by Sunni militants. This came after a local dispute between Sunni and Shia civilians over the latter's celebrations of the Islamic holiday Eid al-Fitr, which marks the end of the holy month of Ramadan. The militants, who were still fasting for Ramadan, had attacked the Shias, already celebrating; the Shias had claimed to have made their first sighting of the crescent moon, which commences Eid al-Fitr, and the Sunnis did not believe them. A contingent of Sunni militants and armed tribesmen from various other places in Pakistan then came to Gilgit, reportedly sent by the Pakistani government to "teach [the Shias] a lesson". Indian intelligence official B. Raman alleged in 2003 that bin Laden had led one of the tribes during the march.

=== Return to Saudi Arabia ===
Upon bin Laden's return to Saudi Arabia after the Soviet withdrawal, he was widely praised by Saudis as a hero of jihad, as many viewed his mujahideen force as responsible for defeating the Soviet superpower. He then worked for the Saudi Binladin Group, even after he began engaging in Saudi opposition movements against the House of Saud.

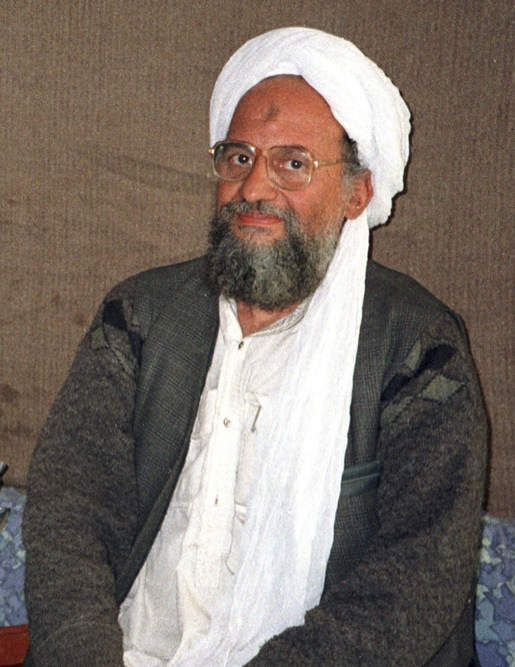
Ayman al-Zawahiri in 2001

In November 1989, Abdullah Yusuf Azzam was assassinated in a land mine attack in Pakistan; it is unknown if bin Laden was a perpetrator. With this, bin Laden took full control of MaK, which he absorbed into al-Qaeda. From then on, he was radicalized further by EIJ leader Ayman al-Zawahiri. In 1990, bin Laden funded a coup attempt led by extremist communist general Shahnawaz Tanai to overthrow the Republic, which failed. In 1991, as the Soviet Union collapsed, it ended its remaining support to the Republic.

Bin Laden became involved in countries' politics outside of Saudi Arabia and Afghanistan. He lobbied the Parliament of Pakistan to carry out a motion of no confidence against Prime Minister Benazir Bhutto; the motion was unsuccessful. He also offered the House of Saud to send al-Qaeda to overthrow the Soviet-aligned Yemeni Socialist Party (YSP) government in the country of South Yemen, but this was rejected by Prince Turki Al-Faisal. Bin Laden then organized the assassinations of YSP leaders in an attempt to disrupt North and South Yemen's process of unifying into one country; he was forced to stop by Saudi Interior Minister Prince Nayef bin Abdulaziz, after North Yemeni president Ali Abdullah Saleh, a leader in the unification process, complained to the Saudi King Fahd. The unification occurred in 1990, forming the modern Republic of Yemen, first led by Saleh.

=== Gulf War ===
The 1990 Iraqi invasion of Kuwait under Iraqi president Saddam Hussein started the Gulf War (1990–1991). Soon, Iraqi forces deployed to the Saudi–Iraqi border. The House of Saud became worried that their control over Saudi Arabia was unstable, as Saddam publicly supported pan-Arabism—the royals were worried he aimed to incite internal dissent against them. Fahd agreed to the U.S. government's offer of military assistance; a week later, bin Laden met with Fahd and Saudi Defense Minister Sultan bin Abdulaziz, telling them not to depend on non-Muslim assistance. Bin Laden offered to help defend Saudi Arabia with a mujahideen force of his. The offer was denied, and the Saudis ultimately accepted 500,000 U.S. troops into their territory.

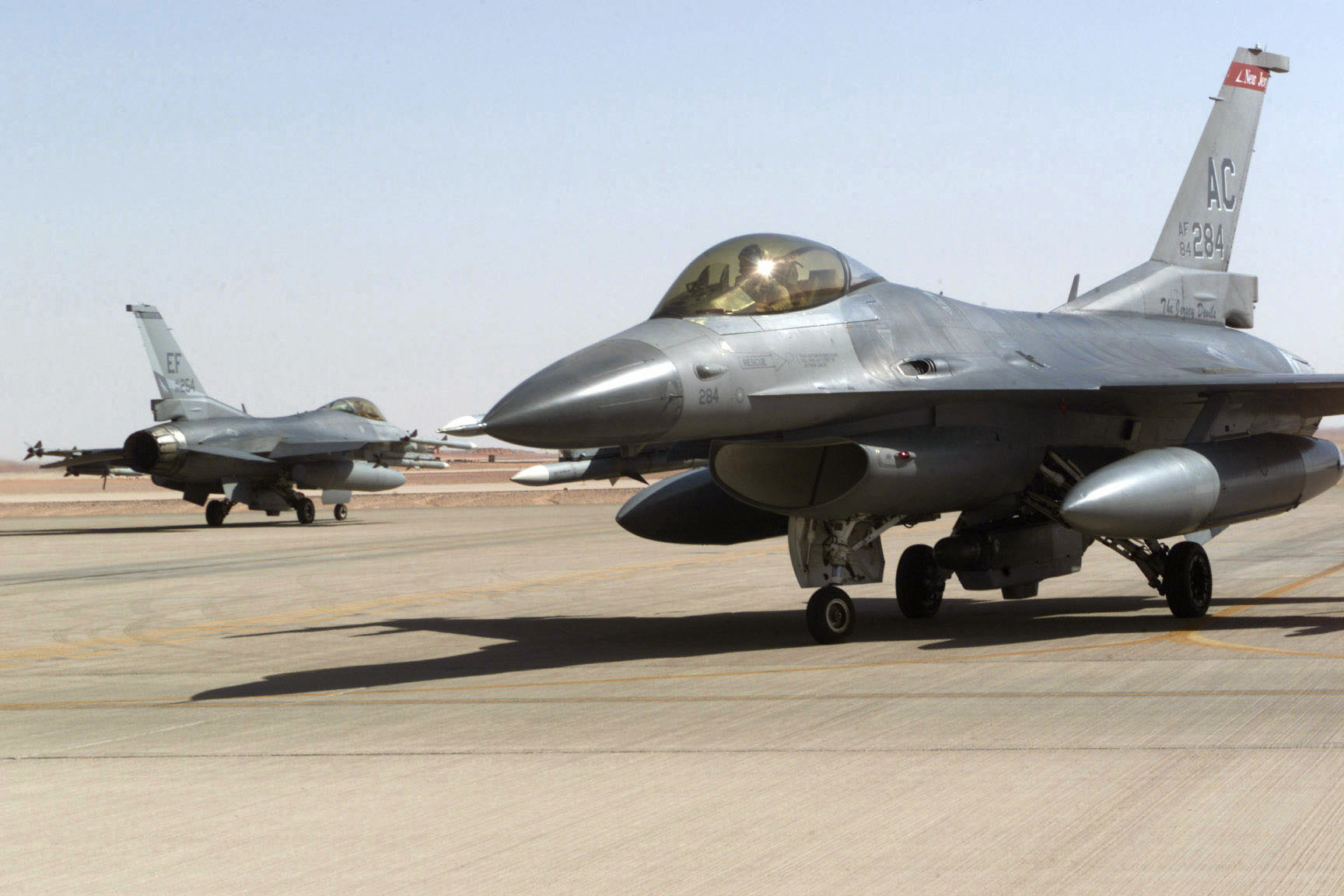
Two U.S. fighter jets departing Prince Sultan Air Base in Saudi Arabia in 2000, during Operation Southern Watch

Bin Laden publicly denounced the decision, and tried to convince the Saudi ulama to issue a fatwa condemning it, but senior clerics refused out of fear of government repression. His continued criticism of the royals led them to put him under house arrest, which he remained under until he was exiled from the country in 1991. After the war, the royals allowed U.S. troops to have a continuous presence there, in Operation Southern Watch, for the purpose of controlling air space in Iraq.

=== Move to Sudan ===
After his expulsion, bin Laden and his followers moved first to Afghanistan, then relocated to Sudan in a deal brokered by Ali Mohamed. Bin Laden established a new base for mujahideen operations in Khartoum. He bought a house on Al-Mashtal Street in the affluent Al-Riyad neighborhood, and a retreat at Soba on the Blue Nile. He personally selected the bodyguards in his security detail, who carried Strela-2s, AK-47s, PK machine guns, rocket-propelled grenades (RPGs), and Stinger missiles. He invested heavily in various businesses, notably in infrastructure and agriculture. Al-Zawahiri followed bin Laden to Sudan, where the EIJ and al-Qaeda collaborated.

Bin Laden was popular with the locals, who considered him generous to the poor. He built roads in the country with the work of former Afghan mujahideen members, who used the same bulldozers bin Laden had employed in Afghanistan to construct tracks in the mountains. He continued to criticize King Fahd, so in 1994, Fahd stripped him of his Saudi citizenship. Bin Laden's family disowned him, and Fahd persuaded them to cut off his yearly stipend of $7 million USD.

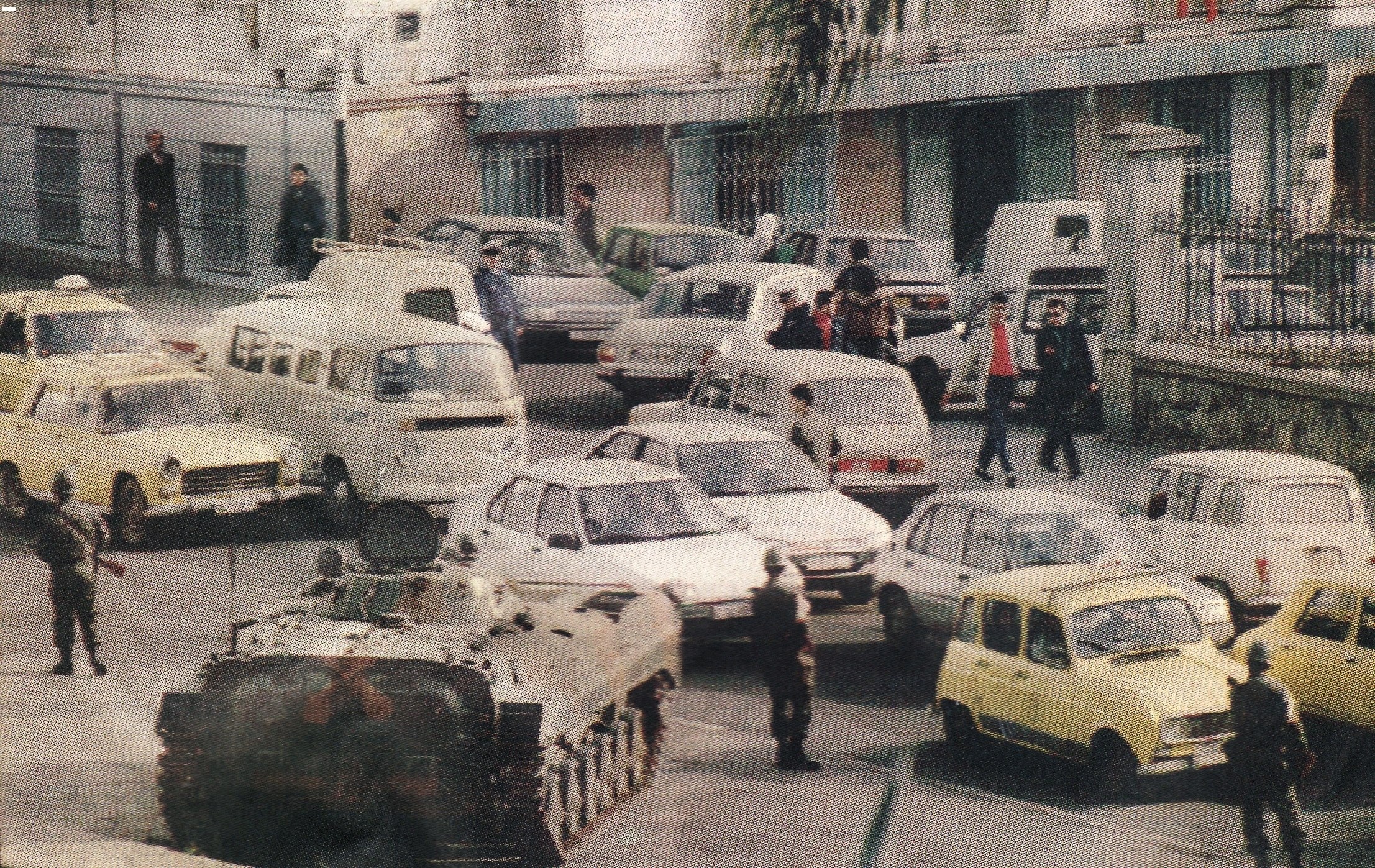
Algerian government tanks in Algiers in 1991, at the start of the Algerian Civil War

In the 1990s, al-Qaeda assisted jihadists financially, and sometimes militarily, in Algeria, Egypt, and Afghanistan. In 1992 or 1993, bin Laden sent an emissary, Qari el-Said, with $40,000 USD to Algeria to aid the local Islamists and urge them to go to war against the Algerian government, rather than negotiate with them. Their advice was heeded. The resulting Algerian Civil War (1992–2002) killed 44,000 to 200,000 people, and ended with the Islamists surrendering to the government.

In early 1992, as the Democratic Republic of Afghanistan was collapsing at the end of the 1989–1992 civil war, leaders of mujahideen groups around the country planned negotiations to create a new government that shared power between the groups. In March or April, bin Laden tried to encourage Gulbuddin Hekmatyar, leader of the group Hezb-e Islami Gulbuddin, to join the negotiations, rather than trying to conquer Kabul with his own group so it could establish its own government. Hekmatyar unsuccessfully tried the latter, while a new coalition government, the Islamic State of Afghanistan, was founded. This led to another Afghan civil war (1992–1996), this time between Hezb-e Islami Gulbuddin, the coalition, al-Qaeda, and other groups.

=== First al-Qaeda attacks on the U.S. ===
In November 1990, the FBI raided the New Jersey home of El Sayyid Nosair, an associate of Ali Mohamed. They discovered copious evidence of terrorist plots, including plans to blow up skyscrapers in New York City. This was the earliest discovery of al-Qaeda terrorist plans outside of Muslim countries. Their first successful terrorist bombings were on 29 December 1992. Bombs were detonated at the Mövenpick Hotel and Gold Mohur Hotel in Aden, Yemen, killing two civilians at the Gold Mohur. U.S. troops had been staying at the hotels while en route to Somalia to participate in Operation Restore Hope.

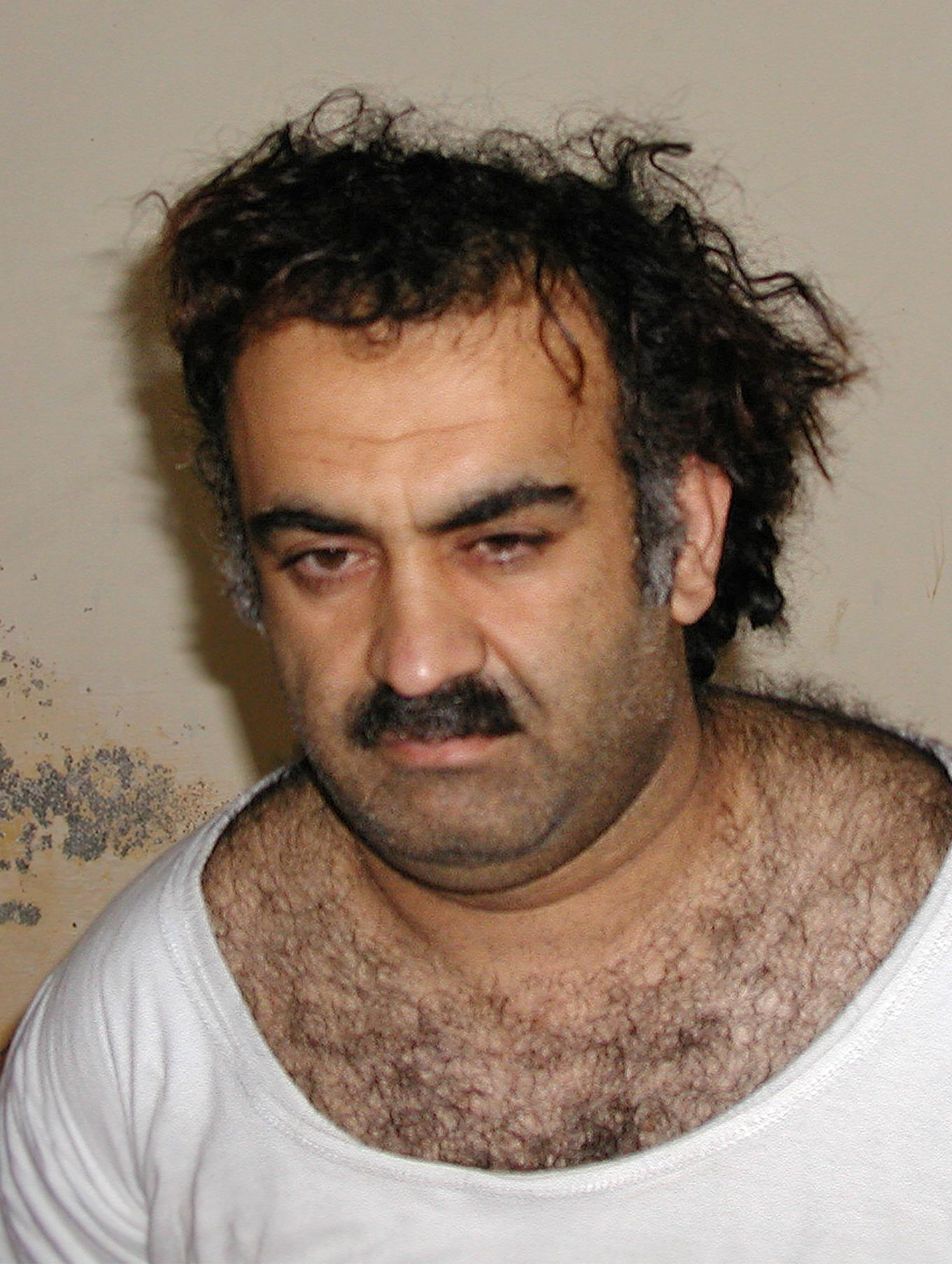
Khalid Sheikh Mohammed upon his capture in 2003

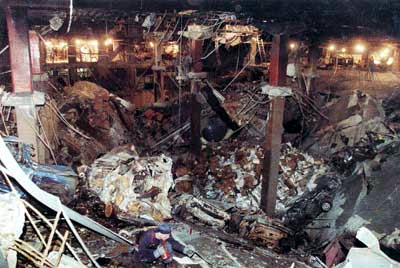
The aftermath of al-Qaeda's 1993 bombing of the World Trade Center

In the early 1990s, Khalid Sheikh Mohammed became a top lieutenant of bin Laden, and devised a plan, codenamed "Bojinka", for a series of terrorist attacks by al-Qaeda targeting airliners. In the Bojinka plot, al-Qaeda and an allied group, Jemaah Islamiyah, planned for eleven planes departing Southeast Asia en route to the U.S. to simultaneously be destroyed by bombs over the Pacific Ocean. Pope John Paul II was planned to be assassinated.

In 1993, Mohammed's nephew, Ramzi Yousef, and a group of al-Qaeda members bombed the underground portion of the World Trade Center in New York City, killing six people and injuring more than a thousand.

In 1994, Yousef rehearsed the Bojinka bombings by setting one off at a theatre in Manila, and the other onboard Philippine Airlines Flight 434, which killed a passenger. In 1995, weeks before the planned attack date, the plot was foiled when Yousef's Manila apartment burned down; investigating the fire, police found evidence incriminating him in the plot. He was sentenced to life imprisonment in the U.S., while Mohammed continued with his plan for hijacking airliners.

The Los Angeles Times, 28 May 1995
"Terrorists plotted to blow up 11 U.S. jumbo jets"

"Philippine and Western intelligence experts said in interviews that the investigation into the [newly revealed] Bojinka plot has also provided disturbing evidence of the existence of a worldwide network of terrorists who received weapons training and firebrand religious indoctrination during [their war against] the Soviet Union in Afghanistan."

=== Bosnian War ===
The Bosnian War (1992–1995) was an ethnic conflict in the Republic of Bosnia and Herzegovina. Bosniaks, many of whom are Muslims, fought the Bosnian Serb and Bosnian Croat forces of two unrecognised breakaway states within the Republic's borders—respectively, Republika Srpska and the Croatian Republic of Herzeg-Bosnia. In 1992, the two states' militaries, the Army of Republika Srpska and the Croatian Defence Council, began ethnic cleansing operations against the Bosniaks. In response, Bosnian Muslim militants allied with the Republic in jihad against the Serbs and Croats, and foreign Muslims in the 'Bosnian mujahideen' joined them. The mujahideen allegedly participated in war crimes, including killing and torturing Serbian and Croat civilians, and using them as human shields. In 1995, the Bosnian War ended with the Republic's dissolution, and the formation of the country simply named Bosnia and Herzegovina.

Evidence shows that bin Laden aided the Bosnian mujahideen. In 2002, authorities in Sarajevo, Bosnia, raided the offices of the Saudi High Commission for Relief of Bosnia and Herzegovina, a Saudi aid agency which assisted Bosnian Muslims in the war. They found materials with information on multiple Saudi financiers of the mujahideen, including bin Laden. Another item found was the 'Golden Chain' document, which claims to be a list of bin Laden's own financiers. Details about the list, including its entries and time of writing, are speculative, as it has never been publicly released—however, in 2003, The Wall Street Journal reported that it included some of bin Laden's brothers, the Alrajhi banking family, and billionaire bankers Khalid bin Mahfouz and Saleh Kamel.

Following the Bosnian War, many in the mujahideen formed Islamic terrorist groups, which came under the protection of fellow Muslim militants who had served the Republic. These terrorists also had ties to bin Laden, some of them still connected by October 2001.

=== Threat of expulsion from Sudan ===
In 1995, the EIJ, working with Sudanese intelligence and Egyptian group al-Gama'a al-Islamiyya, attempted to assassinate Egyptian president Hosni Mubarak. The attempt failed, and following this, international pressure was put on Sudan to expel the EIJ and al-Qaeda. The U.S. State Department accused Sudan of being a sponsor of international terrorism, and bin Laden of operating terrorist training camps in Sudan. However, according to Sudanese officials, this stance became obsolete as Islamist political leader Hassan al-Turabi lost influence in their country. Sudan wanted to engage with the U.S., but American officials refused to meet with them even after they had expelled bin Laden. It was not until 2000 that the State Department authorized U.S. intelligence officials to visit the country.

In late 1995, the U.S. learned that Sudan was discussing a possible expulsion of bin Laden. The U.S. Ambassador to Sudan, Timothy Carney, encouraged Sudan to go through with this, though Sudan had trouble deciding where bin Laden should be expelled to; the Saudis did not want him, and no country had an outstanding indictment against bin Laden. Saudi official Fatih Erwa later claimed Sudan offered to hand bin Laden over to the U.S.; the American government's 9/11 Commission Report (2004) found "no credible evidence" of this.

=== Bin Laden Issue Station ===
In January 1996, the CIA launched a new unit of its Counterterrorism Center (CTC) called the Bin Laden Issue Station, code-named "Alec Station", to track and to carry out operations against his activities. The station was headed by CTC veteran Michael Scheuer. U.S. intelligence monitored bin Laden in Sudan using operatives to run by daily and to photograph activities at his compound, and using an intelligence safe house and signals intelligence to surveil him and to record his moves.

=== Return to Afghanistan ===
Sudan expelled bin Laden in 1996, and allowed him to fly to Jalalabad, Afghanistan aboard a chartered flight on 18 May. Al-Qaeda was allowed to operate in Afghanistan by the Taliban, who won the 1992–96 war, and founded the Islamic Emirate of Afghanistan in late 1996. Until the Emirate's dissolution in 2001, bin Laden worked closely with the Supreme Leader of Afghanistan, Mullah Omar. Bin Laden helped cement his alliance with the Taliban by sending several hundred of his fighters to help the Taliban kill 5,000 to 6,000 Hazaras in the city of Mazar-i-Sharif. In mid-1997, the Northern Alliance, who were fighting the Taliban in the 1996–2001 Afghan Civil War, were positioned to overrun Jalalabad, causing bin Laden to abandon his home of Najim Jihad near the city, and move south to Tarnak Farms.

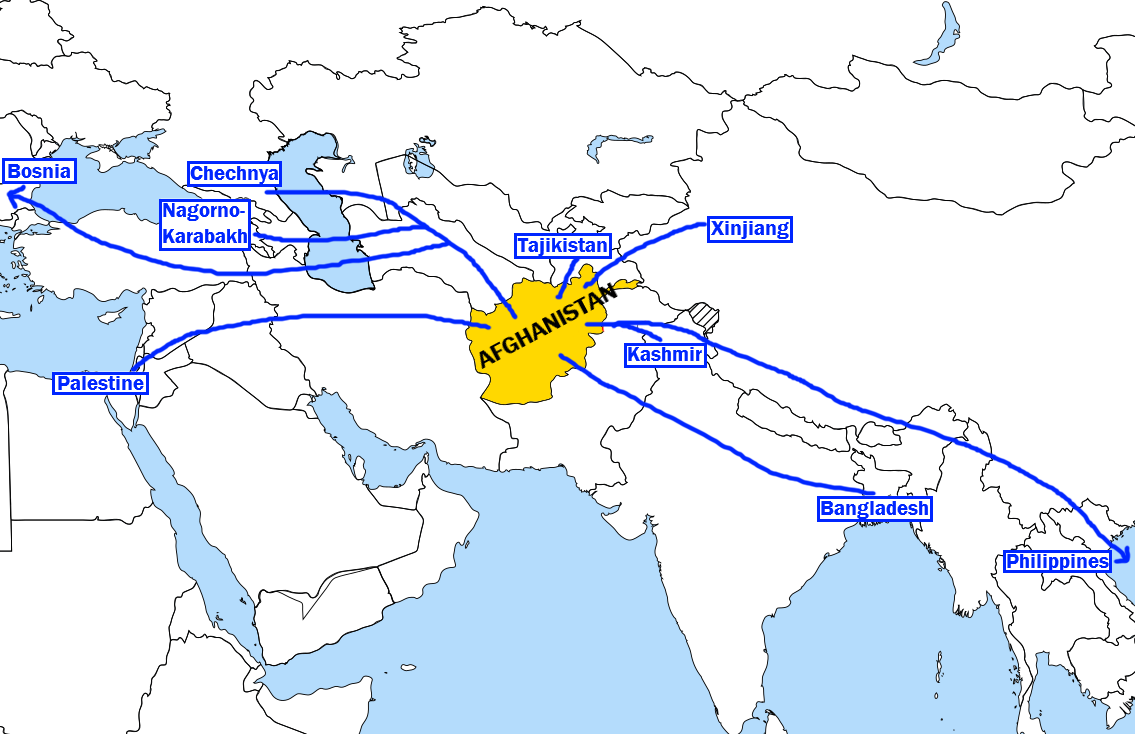
Regions where Islamic extremists who trained at al-Qaeda's Afghan jihadist camps went to afterwards

The expulsion from Sudan significantly weakened al-Qaeda, as bin Laden left millions of dollars USD in Sudan. Some African intelligence sources have argued that he was left without a way to gain political power other than by becoming a full-time radical, and that most of the 300 Afghan Arabs who moved with him subsequently became terrorists. Al-Qaeda raised money both from donors that bin Laden had associated with during the Soviet–Afghan War, and from the ISI, to establish training camps for jihadist militants in Afghanistan. Bin Laden also effectively took over Ariana Afghan Airlines, which ferried Islamic militants, arms, cash, and opium through the United Arab Emirates and Pakistan, and provided false identifications to al-Qaeda members. Russian arms dealer Viktor Bout helped run the airline, maintain planes, and load cargo.

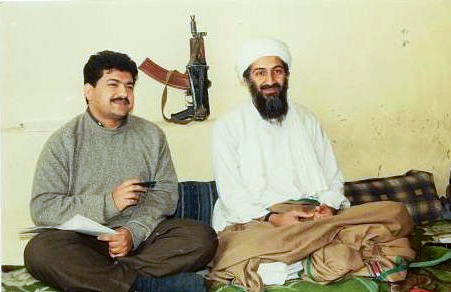
Journalist Hamid Mir interviewing bin Laden, c. 1997–1998

Some researchers, as well as the Swiss Federal Police, allege that bin Laden funded the Luxor massacre, the killing of 62 civilians on 17 November 1997 at the Mortuary Temple of Hatshepsut in Egypt.

In March 1998, Libya issued the first official Interpol arrest warrant for bin Laden. He and three others were charged with killing Silvan Becker, a counterterrorism expert with the BfV, and his wife Vera in Libya in 1994. Bin Laden was still wanted by Libya at the time of his death.

Also in 1998, al-Qaeda declared a formal alliance with the EIJ, and al-Zawahiri became bin Laden's deputy. In June 2001, the two organizations merged.

=== Start of al-Qaeda's war on the U.S. ===
In August 1996, bin Laden issued a fatwa, declaring war on the U.S. in response to their troop presence in Saudi Arabia, which he alleged "had been turned into an American colony" during "America's attempt to take over the region". In February 1998, he issued another fatwa, calling upon Muslims to attack the U.S. and its allies. At the fatwa's announcement, attended by journalists, bin Laden said that North Americans are "very easy targets", and that "you will see the results of this in a very short time."

In November 1996, U.S. president Bill Clinton traveled to the Philippines for the annual APEC meetings. Bin Laden organized a plot to assassinate Clinton by bombing the presidential motorcade as it traveled through Manila. Before the motorcade left, however, U.S. intelligence agents intercepted a message between al-Qaeda agents about the plan, and alerted the U.S. Secret Service. Clinton was unharmed, and the bomb was found planted under a bridge.

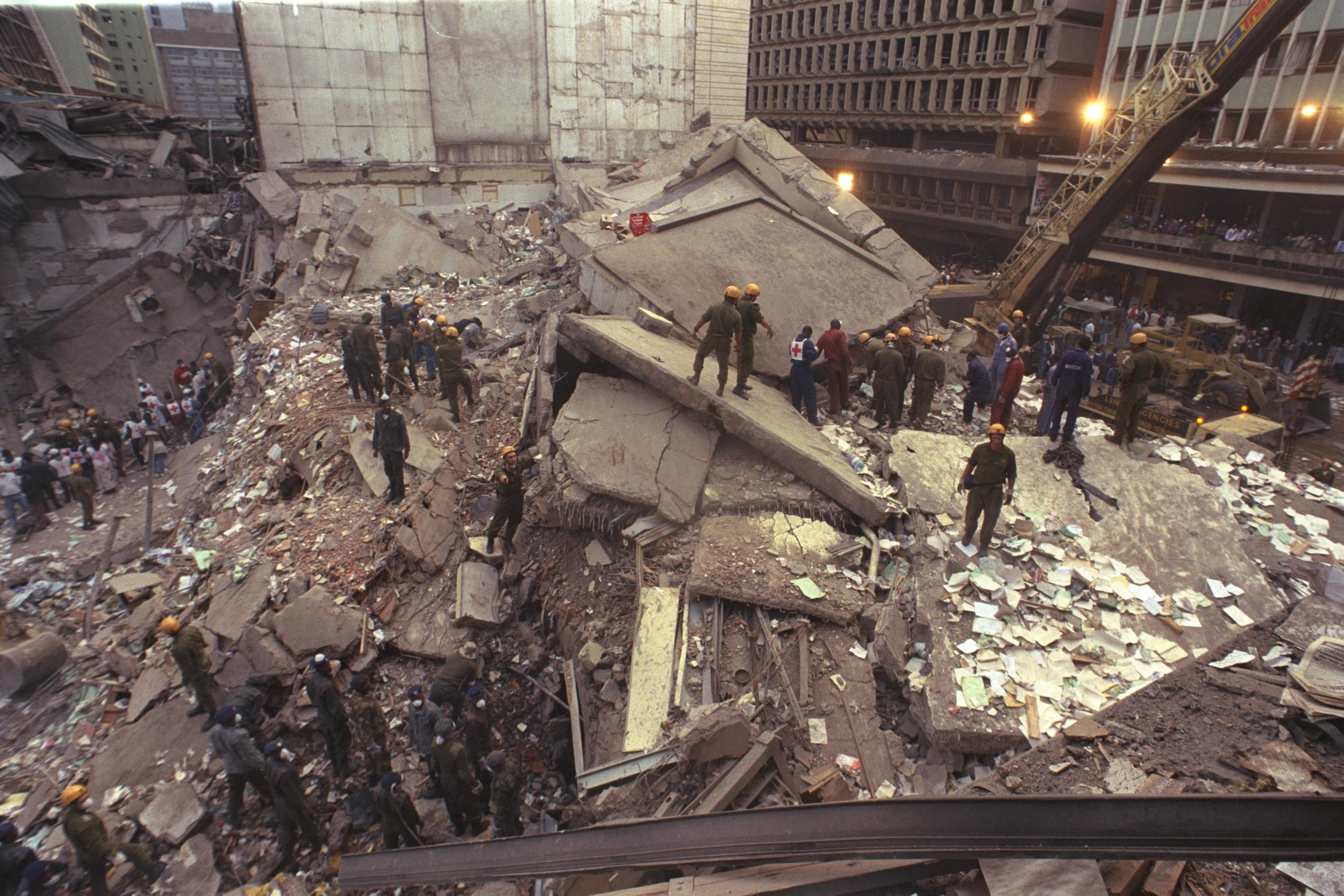
Aftermath of the 1998 bombing of the U.S. embassy in Nairobi, Kenya

Bin Laden was indicted by a grand jury in the U.S. in June 1998, on charges of conspiracy to attack defense utilities of the U.S. and prosecutors further charged that bin Laden was the head of al-Qaeda, and a major financier of Islamic fighters worldwide.

On 7 August 1998, hundreds of people were killed in simultaneous truck bomb explosions at the U.S. embassies in Dar es Salaam, Tanzania; and Nairobi, Kenya. This brought bin Laden and al-Zawahiri to the attention of the U.S. public for the first time. Al-Qaeda later claimed responsibility for the attacks. Capturing bin Laden became an important objective for the U.S. government. Reception to this initiative among U.S. and U.K. intelligence officials was mixed before 9/11.

The Guardian, 3 January 1999
"Caveman terrorist spooks the West"

... "many claim [bin Laden] is not as powerful as the Americans allege. 'I just don't think that a guy in a cave in Afghanistan can send off e-mails over a satellite phone ordering mass destruction anywhere in the world,' one London-based security expert said. 'Real life is not like James Bond films. It is just not that easy to hold the world to ransom.'"

After 9/11, it was revealed that Clinton had authorized the CIA's Special Activities Division to apprehend bin Laden and bring him to the U.S. to stand trial for the bombings; if taking him alive was deemed impossible, then deadly force could be used. Clinton ordered Operation Infinite Reach, a series of cruise missile strikes against al-Qaeda's training camps in Khost, Afghanistan; and Khartoum on 20 August 1998. They missed bin Laden by a few hours.

In November 1998, bin Laden was indicted by a U.S. federal grand jury in the Southern District Court of New York on charges relating to the embassy bombings. The evidence against him included courtroom testimony by former al-Qaeda members, and records from a satellite phone purchased for bin Laden by al-Qaeda agent Ziyad Khaleel in the U.S. The Taliban responded to the indictments by saying they would not extradite bin Laden to the U.S., saying there was insufficient evidence presented by the court, and that non-Muslim courts lacked standing to try Muslims.

In December 1998, the CIA reported to Clinton that al-Qaeda was preparing attacks to occur in the U.S., the preparations involving the training of personnel to hijack aircraft. In June 1999, the FBI placed bin Laden on its Ten Most Wanted Fugitives list. In an attempt to force the Taliban to extradite bin Laden, Clinton tried to convince the United Nations (UN) to impose sanctions against Afghanistan. He was partially successful, as in October 1999, the UN designated al-Qaeda as a terrorist organization, officially obligating countries to freeze the assets of, and impose travel bans on, al-Qaeda members and their associates. Afterwards, the Taliban still did not extradite him.

In late 1999, the CIA and Pakistani military intelligence prepared a team of approximately sixty Pakistani commandos to infiltrate Afghanistan to capture or kill bin Laden, but the plan was aborted upon the Pakistani coup d'état in October. In 2000, foreign operatives working for the CIA fired an RPG at a convoy of vehicles bin Laden was traveling in through the Afghan mountains. It hit a vehicle, but not the one he was in.

=== Insurgency in Yemen ===
After Yemen's 1990 unification, Ali Abdullah Saleh remained its president until 2012. While developing the new country in the 1990s, he found opposition in Sunnis and others, who felt that he was changing Yemeni society too much in the pursuit of North–South cultural unity. He stayed in power for decades by forcefully suppressing his opposition. In 1998, a branch of al-Qaeda named 'al-Qaeda in Yemen' (AQY) began an insurgency against the Yemeni government in an attempt to control the region. The insurgency continues to this day, though AQY is now under al-Qaeda in the Arabian Peninsula.

=== Millennium attack plots and USS Cole bombing ===
In 1999, al-Qaeda planned terrorist attacks to occur in multiple countries on and around New Year's Day 2000 (the date popularly considered the start of the new millennium). All the plans except one failed:

- Four attacks in Jordan were planned by a terrorist cell that al-Qaeda established in Amman. (Note: Three were symbols of non-Islamic religions, and were expecting American tourists on New Year's: the Roman Temple of Hercules at the Amman Citadel in Amman; a hill near the Dead Sea where Jesus was baptized; and Mount Nebo, where Moses saw the Promised Land. The fourth was the Radisson hotel in Amman, where many American and Israeli tourists would be on New Year's.) Their plans were foiled on 30 November, when Jordanian intelligence intercepted a phone call from one of bin Laden's lieutenants, located in Pakistan, to a member of the cell in Amman.
- In the U.S., al-Qaeda planned to bomb Los Angeles International Airport. A cell was established in Canada for this; cell member Ahmed Ressam planned to cross the British Columbian border into Washington state before going to Los Angeles. However, at the border, on 14 December, authorities caught him with bomb-making materials in his car.
- Indian Airlines Flight 814, departing Kathmandu for Delhi on 24 December, was hijacked. The perpetrators, members of the al-Qaeda-linked group Harkat-ul-Mujahideen, first stopped in India, Pakistan, and the UAE, then stayed inside the plane on the ground in Kathmandu. They created a hostage crisis as they kept passengers on board, killing one, while demanding that India release three Muslim militants from prison. On the 31st, India brought both the hijackers and prisoners to the Taliban at the India–Pakistan border.
- Al-Qaeda attempted to bomb USS The Sullivans, a U.S. Navy ship docked in Aden, Yemen, on 3 January 2000. The perpetrators had planned to move a boat filled with explosives towards The Sullivans and then detonate them, but they added too many explosives, and the boat sunk before it could reach her. The terrorists then salvaged the boat and the explosives for use in a similar attempt at a later time.

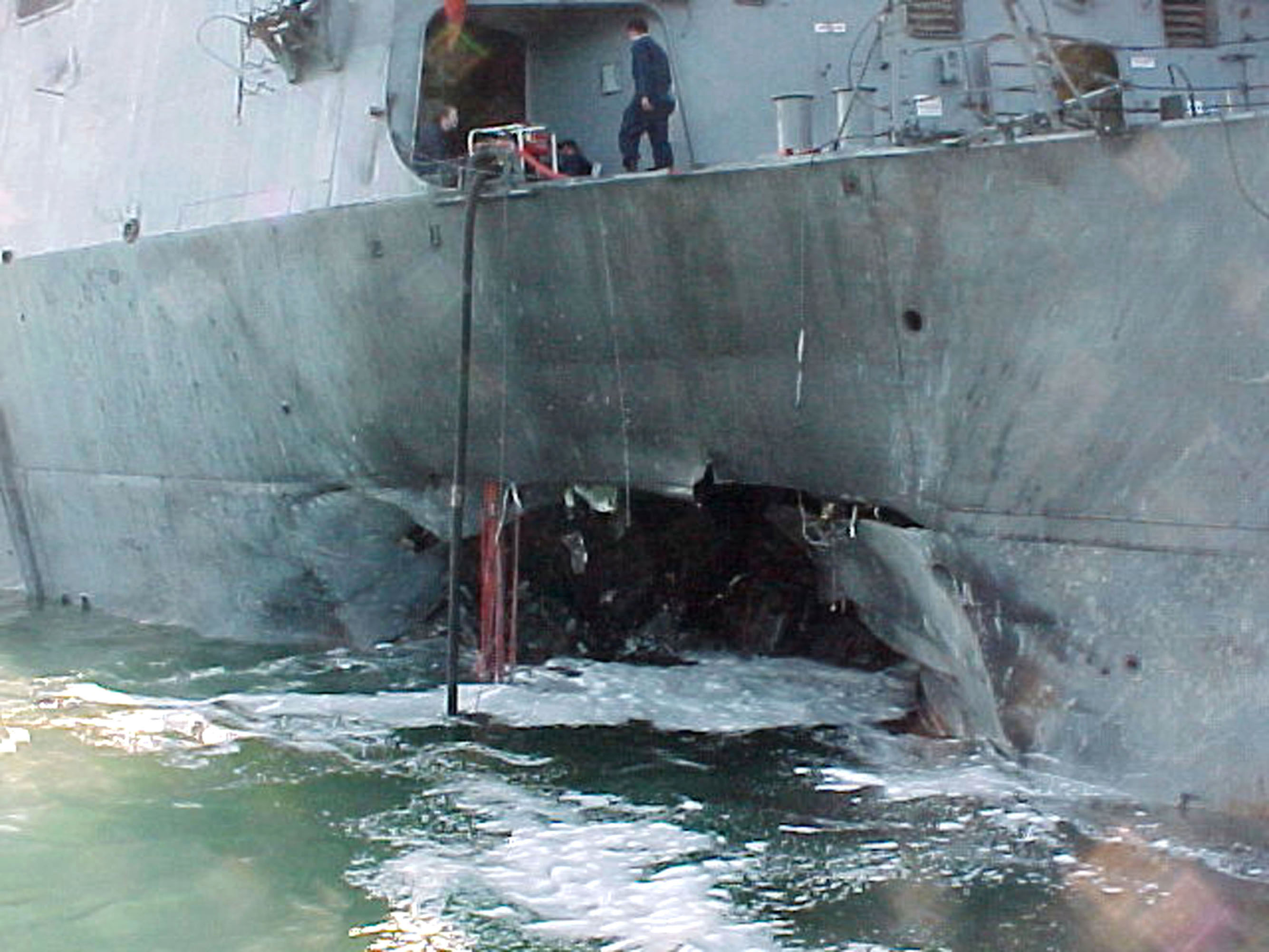
The side of USS Cole (DDG-67) after she was bombed in 2000

The boat and explosives were used again in Aden on 12 October 2000, when al-Qaeda killed 17 U.S. Navy sailors by bombing another docked ship, USS Cole (DDG-67).

=== Kosovo War ===
The Kosovo War (1998–1999) started over a possible separation of the region of Kosovo—home to many ethnic Albanians—from the Republic of Serbia and Federal Republic of Yugoslavia (later named Serbia and Montenegro). In 1998, the head of Albania's State Intelligence Service, Fatos Klosi, said that in 1994, bin Laden founded a terror network disguised as a humanitarian organization in Albania, and that the network were currently taking part in the Kosovo War. Claude Kader, who was a member, later testified to the network's existence while on trial. The network was organized by some Islamic leaders in Western Europe allied to bin Laden and al-Zawahiri. By 1998, four members of EIJ were arrested in Albania and extradited to Egypt.

In 2002, then-former Serbian and Yugoslav president Slobodan Milošević claimed at his UN criminal tribunal that he had received an FBI report which concluded al-Qaeda had aided the Kosovo Liberation Army (KLA), an ethnic-Albanian paramilitary that fought in the Kosovo War for Kosovar independence while killing civilians. Milošević alleged bin Laden had used Albania as a launchpad for violence in the Balkans, and that while Milošević led Yugoslavia (1997 to 2000), his government informed U.S. diplomat Richard Holbrooke that the KLA was being aided by al-Qaeda, yet the U.S. continued to work with the KLA afterwards. Thus, the U.S. may have been knowingly working with bin Laden, despite targeting him after the embassy bombings—and helping create the humanitarian crisis that the U.S. had claimed necessitated the 1999 NATO bombing of Yugoslavia.

== 11 September 2001 attacks ==
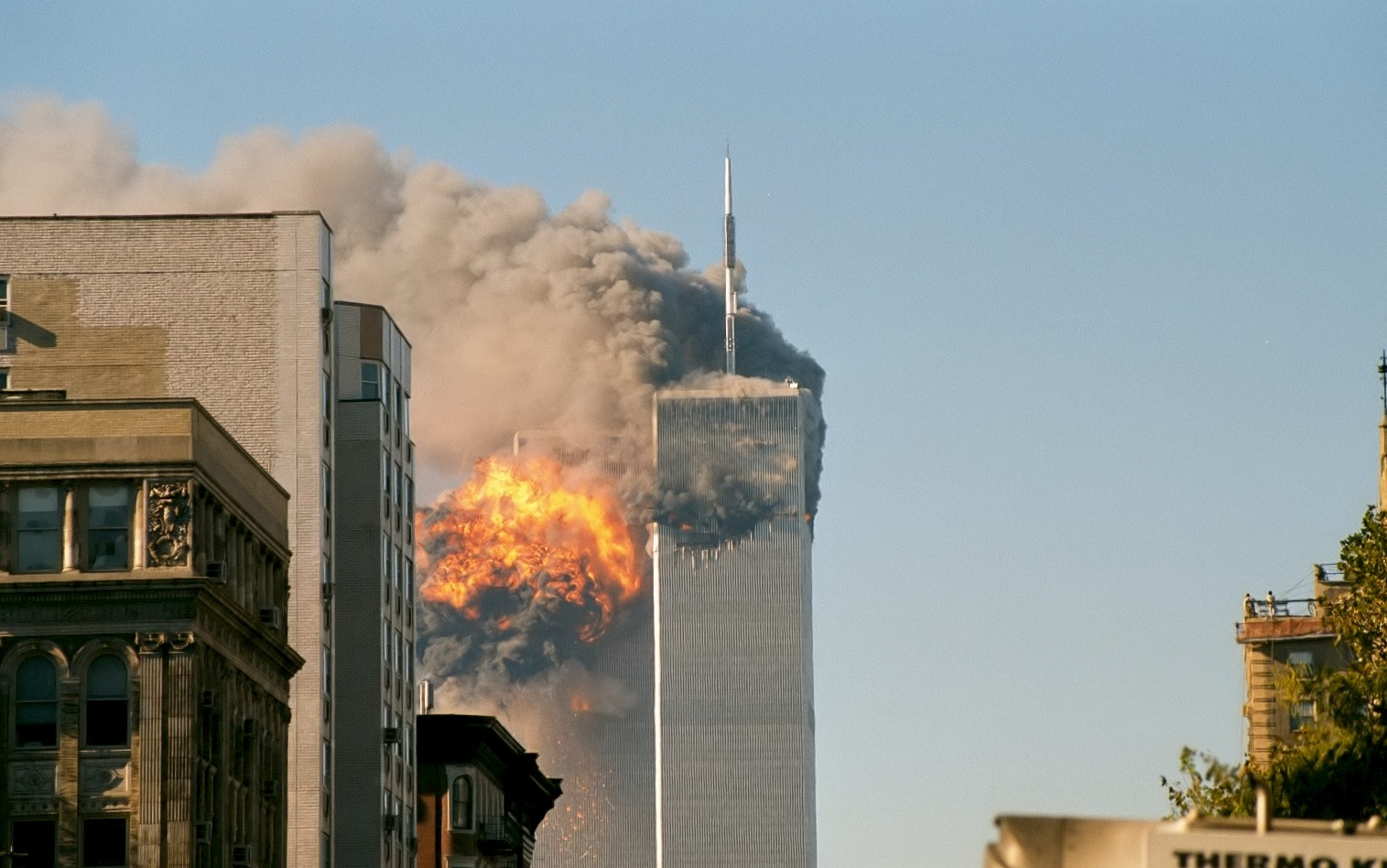
United Airlines Flight 175 crashes into 2 World Trade Center, while 1 World Trade Center burns from the prior crash of American Airlines Flight 11

On 11 September 2001, 19 al-Qaeda members hijacked four airliners departing the U.S. East Coast in an attempt to crash them into various national landmarks. American Airlines Flight 11 and United Airlines Flight 175, both departing Boston en route to Los Angeles, were crashed into the World Trade Center's Twin Towers, 1 and 2 World Trade Center (WTC), respectively. American Airlines Flight 77, departing Dulles, Virginia for Los Angeles, was crashed into the Pentagon. United Airlines Flight 93, departing Newark, New Jersey for San Francisco, did not reach the hijackers' intended destination of Washington, D.C., as the plane crashed in a field in Pennsylvania after the other passengers tried to take back the cockpit from the hijackers. The Twin Towers eventually collapsed, destroying the World Trade Center. All of the hijackers and at least 2,977 victims died directly from the four hijackings. An estimated 25,000 people were injured.

=== Aftermath ===
The destroyed site of the World Trade Center was nicknamed "Ground Zero". Numerous people who were at the site during or after the attacks later developed health issues resulting from inhalation exposure, caused by breathing dust from the collapse. More than 6,000 people have died from 9/11-related diseases as of 2026. The New York City government initially lied to rescue workers at Ground Zero that the air was safe to breathe.

The FBI considers their investigation into 9/11, PENTTBOM, to be their largest criminal investigation ever. Other U.S. federal investigations included the Joint Inquiry into Intelligence Community Activities and the 9/11 Commission. After the attacks, numerous countries strengthened their anti-terrorism legislation. The U.S. Congress passed the Patriot Act, which expanded the powers of U.S. federal agencies to search and surveil criminal suspects; the NSA soon developed a widespread apparatus to surveil Americans' Internet communications, regardless of whether they were suspected of crimes. Many U.S. federal agencies were founded to deter attacks like 9/11, including the Department of Homeland Security, Immigration and Customs Enforcement, and Transportation Security Administration (TSA). U.S. airport security was put under the TSA's operation, replacing the private security companies which were contracted by airlines. Extra security measures became mandated at airport security checkpoints. The U.S. also increased its collaboration with other countries on counterterrorism, reducing the presence of Islamic terrorist cells in the country.

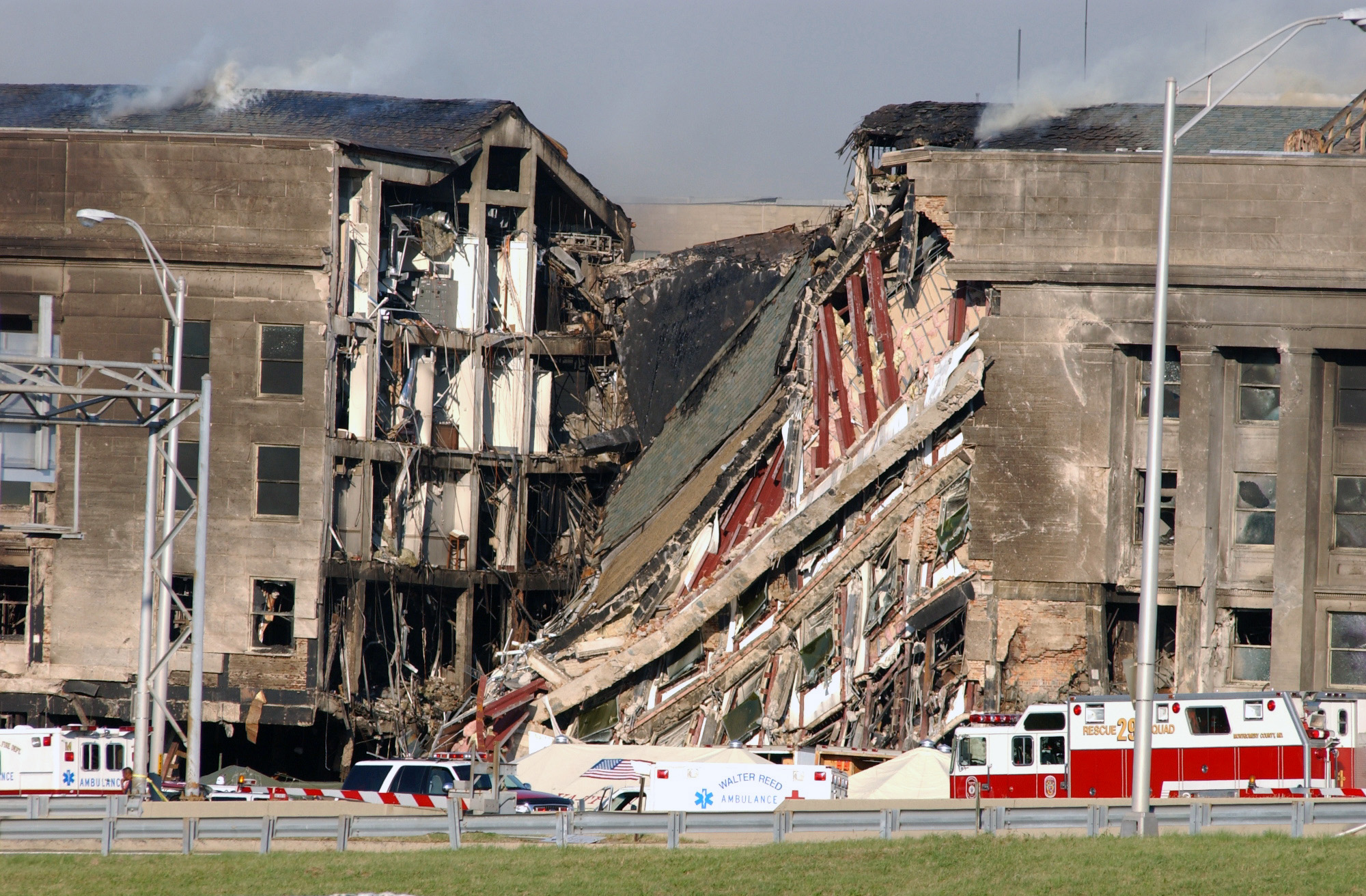
Damage to a section of the Pentagon in Arlington, Virginia on 9/11, after Flight 77's crash and the section's collapse

U.S. president George W. Bush's speech to the American public on the night of the attacks

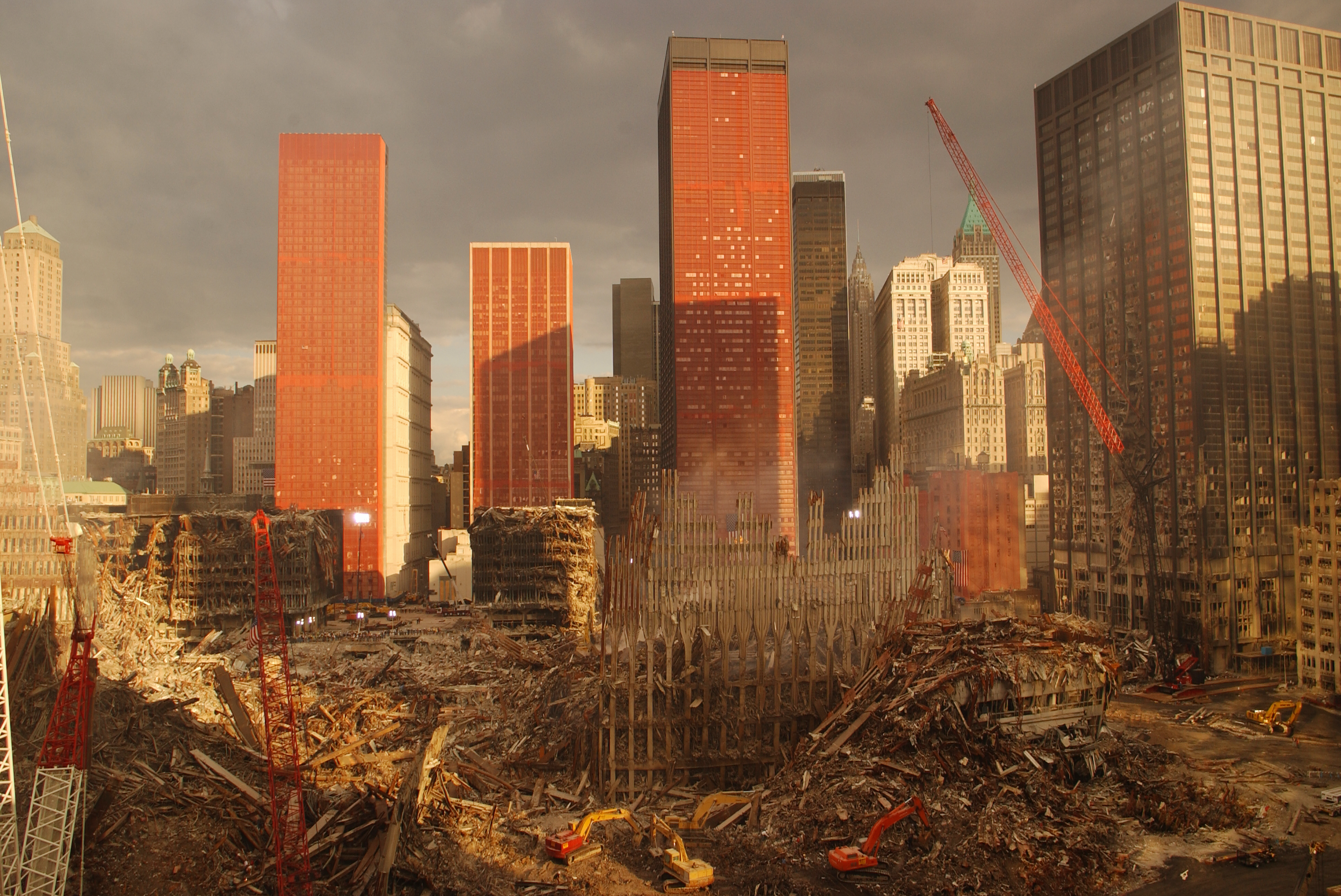
'Ground Zero', the former World Trade Center site, on 28 September 2001

=== Planning ===
In 1996, Khalid Sheikh Mohammed presented bin Laden a modified version of the Bojinka plot idea; in the U.S., al-Qaeda would hijack ten airliners, crashing nine into landmarks. Onboard the tenth, Mohammed and other hijackers would kill every adult male passenger, then land the plane at a U.S. airport. There, Mohammed would give a speech about U.S. foreign policy, and the women and children would be released unharmed. Bin Laden rejected the plan for its complexity, but years later, approved him to work on a scaled-back version. Al-Zawahiri convinced bin Laden to go through with the attacks, and built the "systematic organisation" that allowed al-Qaeda to enact them.

In 1999, bin Laden, Khalid Sheikh Mohammed, and Mohammed Atef designed the general plan for 9/11. They listed potential targets, including the World Trade Center, the Pentagon, the U.S. Capitol, and the White House. They decided that if any of the hijackers could not reach their targets, they were to crash the plane. Bin Laden and other al-Qaeda leaders chose the hijackers in 2000. Around 21 men, including Mohamed Atta, were selected; one, Ramzi bin al-Shibh, was soon denied a U.S. visa, and a likely selection, Zacarias Moussaoui, was arrested in August 2001, so there were ultimately 19. Bin al-Shibh instead acted as a liaison between the hijackers and al-Qaeda's leadership during the preparations. In July 2001, bin al-Shibh met Atta in Spain, and they made the final confirmation of the hijackers' targets. He told Atta that bin Laden wanted the attacks to happen as soon as possible.

Excerpt of the "Phoenix Memo"
by Kenneth Williams, 10 July 2001

"The purpose of this communication is to advise the Bureau and [its agents in] New York of the possibility of a coordinated effort by USAMA-BIN-LADEN (UBL) to send students to the United States to attend civil aviation universities and colleges. [The FBI in] Phoenix has observed an inordinate number of individuals of investigative interest who are attending or who have attended civil aviation universities and colleges in the State of Arizona."

In the months before 9/11, U.S. intelligence agencies received numerous warnings about an incoming attack on the country by al-Qaeda. At the time, many of the agencies did not significantly cooperate with each other on investigations, so the government did not piece these warnings together to make a cohesive picture of the upcoming attack. In July, FBI agent Kenneth Williams wrote the 'Phoenix Memo', a warning circulated within the FBI that bin Laden was sending his followers to Arizona for flight training. It was not seen by the agency's leadership until after the attacks. On 6 August, U.S. president George W. Bush received an intelligence report titled "Bin Ladin Determined to Strike in U.S." [sic].

=== Responsibility for 9/11 and recordings of bin Laden ===
On the day of the attacks, U.S. and German intelligence intercepted communications that pointed to bin Laden's responsibility for them. That night, George W. Bush wrote in his diary that "we think it's Osama bin Laden." U.S. and U.K. intelligence later stated that evidence linking al-Qaeda and bin Laden to 9/11 is clear and irrefutable.

In November 2001, U.S. troops in Afghanistan found a videotape in which bin Laden discusses with Khaled bin Ouda bin Mohammed al-Harbi what is likely 9/11. It was released by the U.S. on 13 December. In it, bin Laden says that it was "calculated in advance [what] the number of casualties from the enemy [would be] based on the position of the towers". He then seems to say that 9/11 exceeded his expectations by the plane impacts in New York unintentionally causing the complete collapse of the Twin Towers:

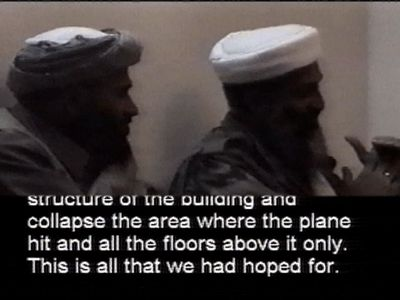
Frame of the video of bin Laden (right) released on 13 December 2001

"I was thinking that the fire from the fuel in the plane would melt the iron structure of the building and collapse the area where the plane hit and the floors above it only. That is all we had hoped for."

On 26 December, Al Jazeera broadcast a video message from bin Laden, in which he again seems to imply responsibility for 9/11: "Our terrorism against the United States is worthy of praise to [...]" The tape was probably made around two weeks prior, as he mentions it being three months since a "blessed attack" on the U.S. Many more vague and cryptic audio recordings of bin Laden were released afterwards. Khalid Sheikh Mohammed and bin al-Shibh took responsibility for the attacks in 2002.

In a 2004 video, bin Laden unambiguously confirmed that he had organized 9/11. He also threatened new attacks against the U.S., and accused George W. Bush of negligence in not preventing the hijackings. The video was first broadcast by Al Jazeera four days before the 2004 U.S. presidential election. Analysts say the timing may have influenced Bush's win against John Kerry in the election; they claim Americans' fear of terrorism after 9/11 was reinforced by the video, which, to many voters, made Bush seem like a stronger protector of America than Kerry, whose opponents accused him of being weak on terrorism.

After the 2004 video, al-Qaeda released videos of bin Laden regularly, demonstrating his continued survival while he was in hiding. One released in 2006 shows bin Laden with bin al-Shibh and two 9/11 hijackers, Hamza al-Ghamdi and Wail al-Shehri, as they made preparations for the attacks. In a 2007 video, bin Laden denied that the Taliban had had any foreknowledge of 9/11.

==== Alleged Saudi role ====
The 9/11 Commission Report stated that the "origin of [al-Qaeda's] funds remains unknown", and that they "have seen no evidence that any foreign government or foreign government official supplied any funding" for 9/11. Despite this conclusion—and bin Laden having been exiled by the House of Saud in 1991—some U.S. investigators allege that Saudi Arabia had funded it. Saudi Arabia has denied this.

Prior to 9/11, multiple U.S. federal agencies investigated possible financial ties between Saudi Arabia and bin Laden. After 9/11, BBC News quoted a source within U.S. intelligence who claimed that after Bush was inaugurated as president in January 2001, his administration had forced the agencies to stop looking into any connections.

In 2002, the Joint Inquiry into Intelligence Community Activities publicly released its final report on 9/11. Twenty-eight pages of it were classified at the request of the Bush administration. They were declassified in 2016, and include details of alleged Saudi involvement in the attacks; they mention that, "while in the United States, some of [the] hijackers were in contact with, and received support or assistance from, individuals who may be connected to the Saudi government".

== Militant and political career, 2001–2011 ==
=== Manhunt for bin Laden and the war in Afghanistan ===
The U.S. launched a global 'war on terror' in response to 9/11, which included a manhunt for bin Laden. Shortly after the attacks, the Taliban refused to extradite him to the U.S.; they offered to try him before a Sharia court, which the U.S. rejected. The CIA's Special Activities Division was given the lead in tracking down and then killing or capturing him. The FBI introduced a list of its Most Wanted Terrorists, initially 22 in total, with bin Laden placed atop as the most crucial to find. The FBI offered a reward of $5 million for information leading to the capture of each person, except bin Laden, who was listed at $25 million. The Airline Pilots Association and the Air Transport Association offered an additional $2 million reward.

Starting on 7 October 2001, a U.S.-led international coalition invaded Afghanistan, to depose the Taliban and capture al-Qaeda members, especially bin Laden. This started the war in Afghanistan (2001–2021). On 14 October, the Taliban offered to turn bin Laden over to a third-party country for trial, in return for the U.S. ending the invasion. This was rejected by Bush, who said that the U.S.'s position was non-negotiable: "there's no need to discuss innocence or guilt. We know he's guilty."

Arabic leaflets distributed by the U.S. during the 2001 invasion of Afghanistan, detailing the bounty for bin Laden and his allies

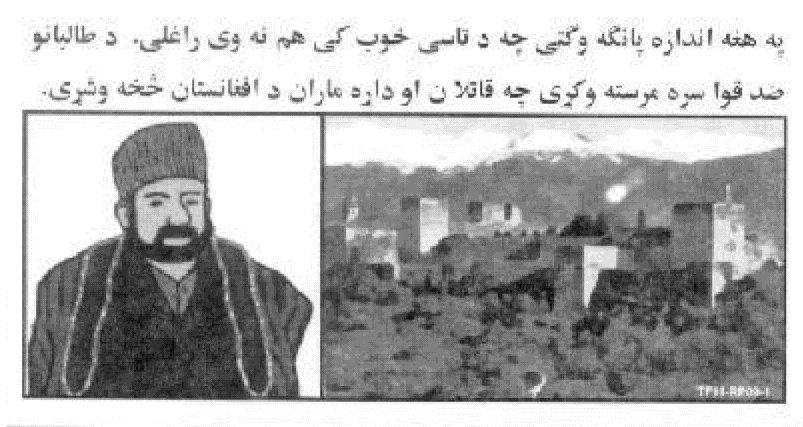
"Get wealth and power beyond your dreams. Help the anti-Taliban forces rid Afghanistan of murderers and terrorists."
(Note: The reverse reads: "You can receive millions of dollars for helping the anti-Taliban force catch al-Qaeda and Taliban murderers. This enough money to take care of your family, your village, your tribe for the rest of your life. Pay for livestock and doctors and school books and housing for all your people.")

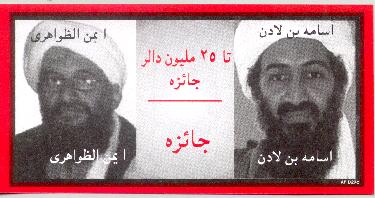
Naming both Ayman al-Zawahiri and bin Laden
(Note: The reverse reads: "Up to $25,000,000 reward for information leading to the whereabouts or capture of these two men!")

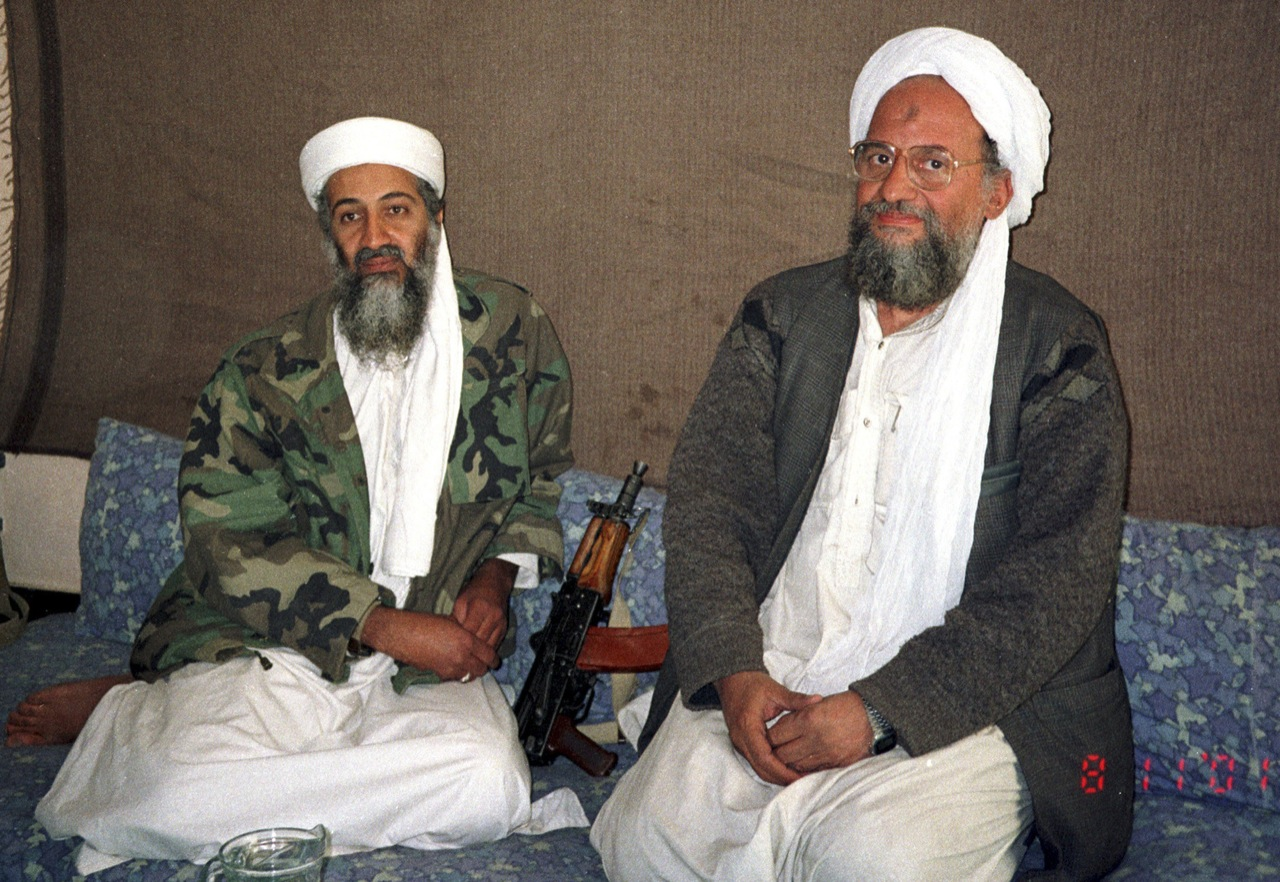
Bin Laden and al-Zawahiri in Kabul, Afghanistan on 8 November 2001

By November 2001, al-Qaeda fighters were still holding out in Afghanistan's eastern mountains. The CIA, meanwhile, was closely tracking bin Laden's movements in hopes to catch him. On 10 November, they spotted him near Jalalabad traveling in a convoy of two hundred pickup trucks. It then headed towards al-Qaeda's training camp within their defensive complex at Tora Bora, in the Safed Koh mountain range. It was twenty miles from Afghanistan's eastern border with Pakistan.

The U.S. attacked the Tora Bora complex in the Battle of Tora Bora from November to December. Early in the battle, CIA intelligence had indicated that bin Laden and the al-Qaeda leadership were trapped in the caves of the complex, and on 1 December, CIA officer Gary Berntsen requested General Tommy Franks to send U.S. Army Rangers to block off the mountain passes into Pakistan and cut off bin Laden's escape. Franks denied the request, as he agreed with the Bush administration that Pakistan would capture bin Laden if he tried to cross the border. With the battle's end, the Taliban had been deposed. Afterwards, its members reformed into the Taliban insurgency, which fought the U.S., its allies, and the new Afghan government until the Taliban retook the country in 2021.

Beginning during the manhunt, various sources have theorized bin Laden to have escaped from Tora Bora across the border into Pakistan during or shortly after the battle. Certain later accounts, based on interviews with Afghan participants in his escape, instead place him in Kunar Province in eastern Afghanistan for some time during the months following the battle. Chris Sands and Fazelminallah Qazizai write that bin Laden and al-Zawahiri descended from Tora Bora to Jalalabad, where they stayed at the home of Afghan commander Awal Gul; the pair then continued to Asadabad, Afghanistan, where they were handed over to men under the command of Kashmir Khan, before settling in a village in Afghanistan's Shaigal District.

Whether or not he stayed in Afghanistan, bin Laden is known to have relocated to Pakistan's Shangla District before February 2002, and lived under the protection of bodyguards and brothers Abu Ahmed al-Kuwaiti and Abrar Ahmed. Gulbuddin Hekmatyar joined them there in February 2002; he narrowly escaped a U.S. drone strike around there in May after his position was coordinated when he used a satellite phone. In early 2003, Khalid Sheikh Mohammed stayed with bin Laden for about two weeks. Mohammed was arrested in Rawalpindi on 1 March, and afterwards, bin Laden left Shangla as he feared his location had been compromised. In the spring or summer of 2003, he moved to Haripur, Pakistan.

==== Bin Laden's move to Abbottabad ====
In early 2004, bin Laden's bodyguards began purchasing land in the Khyber Pakhtunkhwa city of Abbottabad, for the construction of a new compound. It was less than 2 kilometres (1 mi) from the Pakistan Military Academy, and less than 100 kilometres (62 mi) from the Pakistani capital of Islamabad. Satellite imagery of the area taken at one point in 2004 shows no building on the plot. Bin Laden moved into the completed compound in August 2005 with two of his wives, six of his children, and the two bodyguards and their families. U.S. intelligence later determined that it may have been bin Laden's home for at least five years.

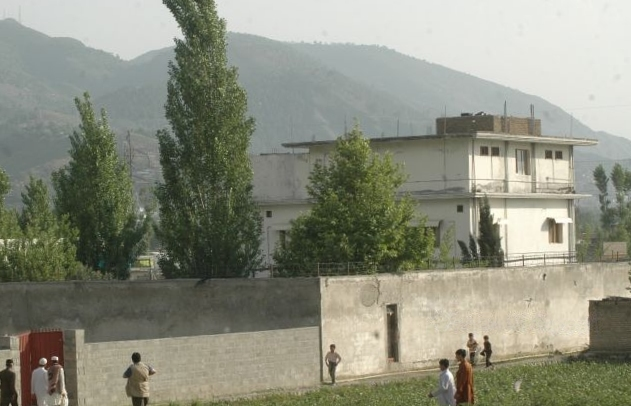
The compound, as seen on 4 May 2011

Diagram of the compound

=== Al-Qaeda operations after 9/11 ===
After 9/11, Interpol issued a warrant for al-Zawahiri's arrest, over his involvement in the attacks. While in hiding, he became the spokesperson for al-Qaeda, issuing its fatwas and appearing in its video statements to the public. Throughout the 2000s, he formed al-Qaeda franchises in Algeria, Egypt, Indonesia, Libya, Mali, Nigeria, Saudi Arabia, Somalia, and Uzbekistan. The Guardian writes that by 2009, U.S. intelligence thought of al-Zawahiri as "al-Qaeda's strategic commander, relegating bin Laden to ideological figurehead."

Also following the attacks, the U.S. opened numerous secret prisons for the CIA, or black sites, across the world, as well as the Guantanamo Bay detention camp in Cuba, and the Bagram prison in Afghanistan—all to house confirmed or suspected militants and terrorists. At these locations, the U.S. deployed torture methods, officially named 'enhanced interrogation techniques', against prisoners, sometimes to gather information about al-Qaeda. Research has found that torture does not work as an interrogation technique, and often leads to the victims giving false info. Khalid Sheikh Mohammed and Ramzi bin al-Shibh hid in Pakistan after 9/11. Bin al-Shibh was captured in 2002, and he and Mohammed were both tortured at CIA black sites.

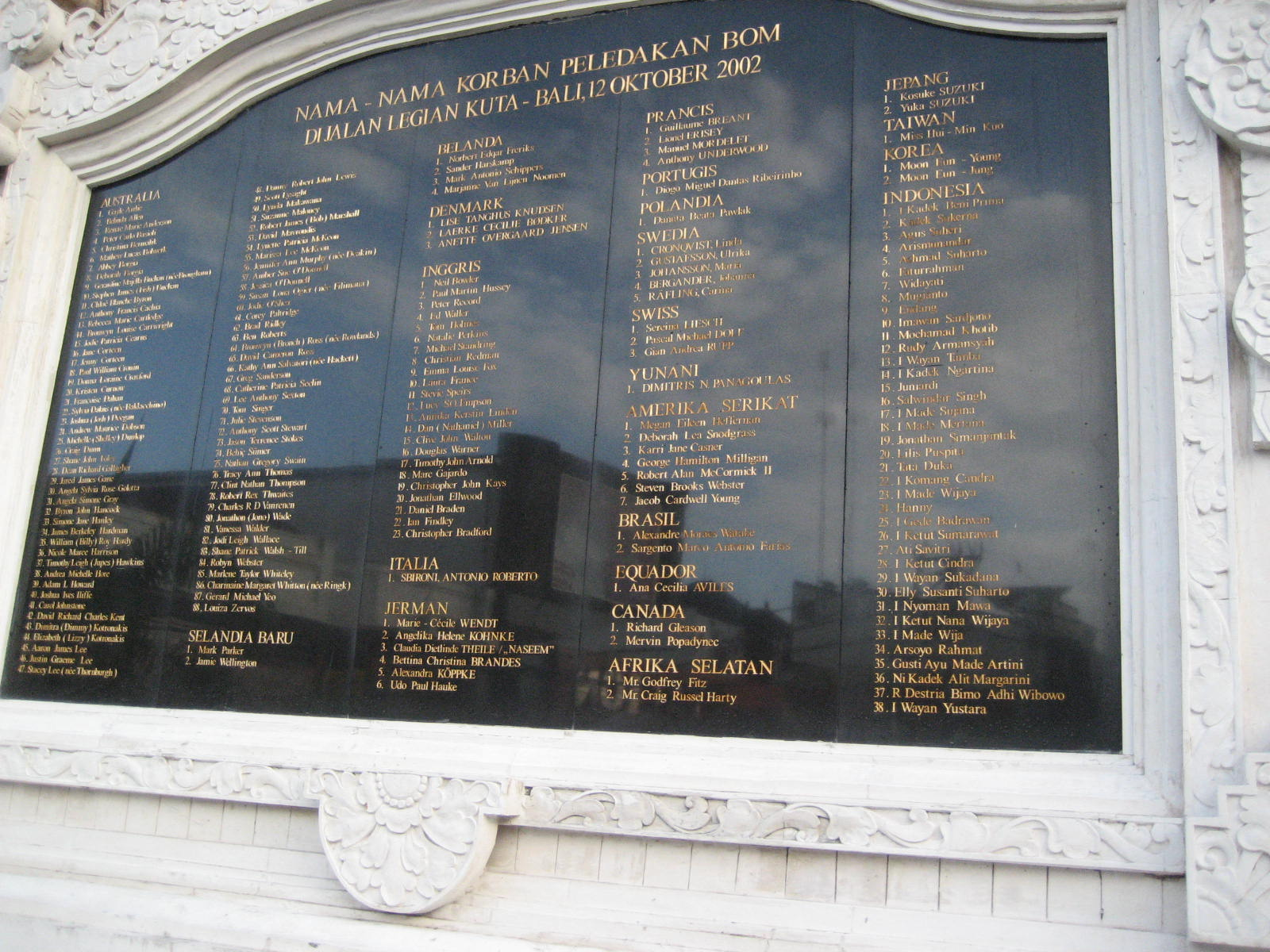
A list of victims of the 2002 Bali bombings, present at one of the bombing locations

On 12 October 2002, Jemaah Islamiyah detonated three bombs on the Indonesian island of Bali, two at Kuta Beach at locations historically popular with Australian tourists, and one at an Australian consulate. The attacks killed 202 people, 88 of them Australian. Hundreds of others were wounded.

On 15 and 20 November 2003, al-Qaeda and collaborating Turkish Islamists detonated bombs in Istanbul, one at a British consulate, the other at an HSBC bank (HSBC being a British company). 27 people were killed and 400 were wounded. (Note: The top British diplomat in the city, Consul-General Roger Short, was one of those killed.)

In London on 7 July 2005, a London Bus and three trains in the London Underground were hit by terrorist bombings, which killed 52 people and injured over 700. On 21 July, four more bombs were detonated in the city, but caused no deaths or injuries. The terrorist cells behind both attacks were linked to al-Qaeda.

In 2009, al-Zawahiri merged al-Qaeda in Yemen and al-Qaeda of Saudi Arabia into 'al-Qaeda in the Arabian Peninsula' (AQAP). The Guardian writes that AQAP "proved to be the most loyal and effective of [the al-Qaeda] franchises" that al-Zawahiri established in the 2000s.

In July 2010, Ahmad Sidiqi, a frequent visitor to a German mosque that had ties to al-Qaeda's German terrorist cell in the 1990s, was captured in Afghanistan. He was then interrogated by the U.S. at Bagram prison. Notably, American officials tortured Bagram's prisoners during interrogations in the 2000s, and might have still done so by 2012. According to the U.S., Sidiqi told them that bin Laden had recently ordered al-Qaeda to conduct terrorist attacks across Europe. Bin Laden's plot was indeed real, and ultimately foiled by European authorities.

==== Iraq War ====
Led by the U.S., an international coalition invaded Iraq in March 2003 to topple Saddam Hussein's government, starting the Iraq War (2003–2011). In the lead-up to the invasion, the Bush administration tied Saddam to al-Qaeda and 9/11, despite having no evidence internally that Iraq was involved in the attacks. Saddam's government was toppled in April. Opponents of the invasion then formed the Iraqi insurgency, which fought the coalition and the coalition-installed replacement government. In 2004, Abu Musab al-Zarqawi, the leader of the Sunni Iraqi insurgent group Jama'at al-Tawhid wal-Jihad (JTJ), declared the group's allegiance to al-Qaeda, in exchange for bin Laden publicly recognizing him as the head of a new version of JTJ, al-Qaeda in Iraq (AQI). AQI became one of the main insurgent forces. In November 2005, it committed suicide bombings targeting three hotels in Amman, killing 60 people.

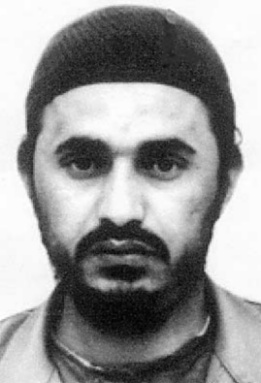
Abu Musab al-Zarqawi

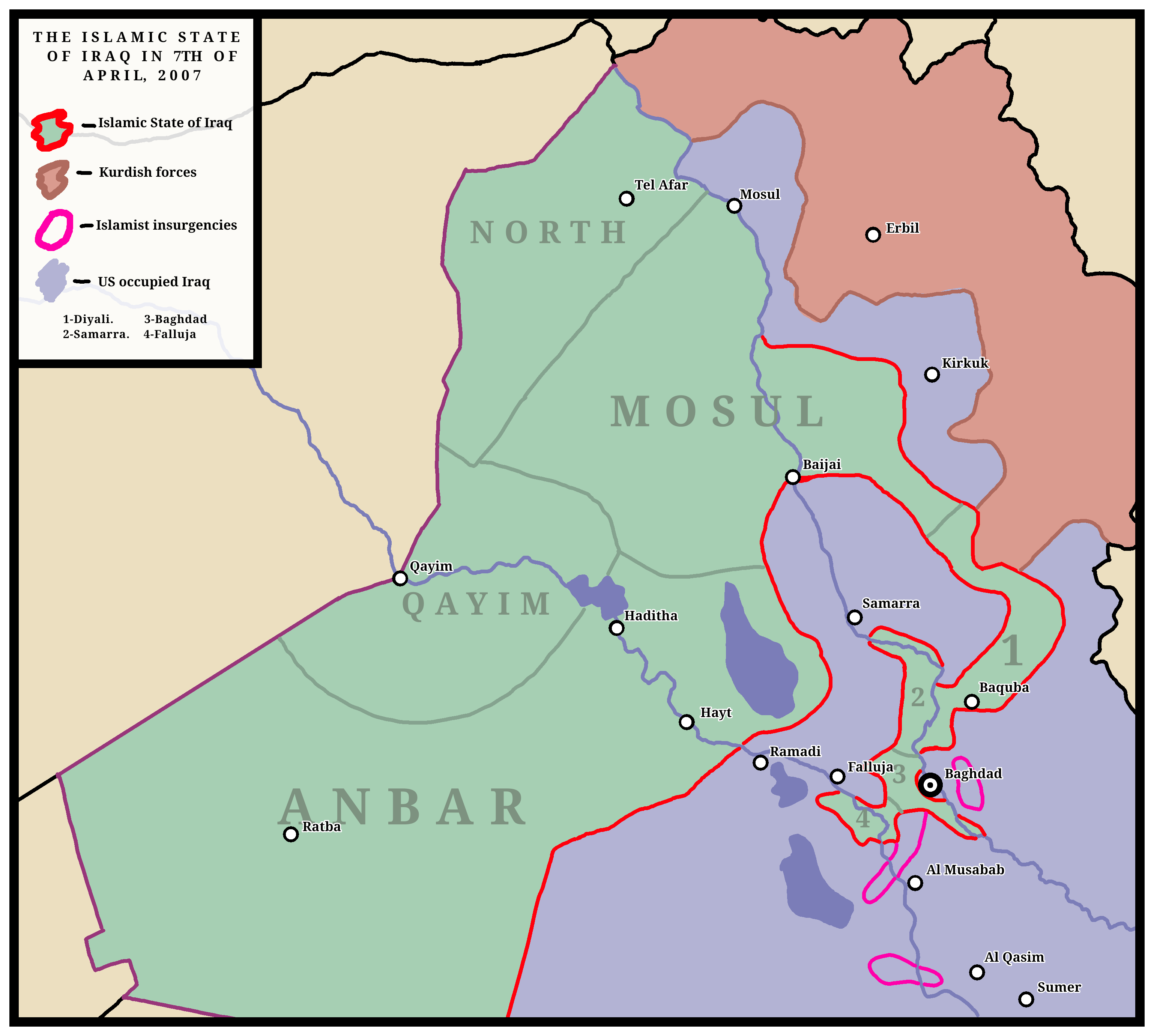
De facto territory of the Islamic State of Iraq in April 2007

Al-Zarqawi intended to use the destabilization caused by the insurgency's war against the coalition to further the sectarian violence between Iraqi Sunnis and Shias, by attacking Shias and their holy sites. He strived for a sectarian civil war that would reestablish the national Sunni dominance over Shias that had been dissolved upon Hussein's ousting. In 2006, AQI claimed responsibility for the 22 February bombing of the al-Askari Mosque in Samarra, Iraq—one of the holiest Shia sites—which destroyed its upper exterior. The sectarian violence increased as al-Zarqawi intended. He was killed by the U.S. in June, which did not quell the violence.

The vacancy in AQI's leadership after al-Zarqawi's death led the organization to become the Islamic State of Iraq; its allegiance to al-Qaeda continued. The Islamic State of Iraq decided to capture large swaths of territory in Iraq while fighting the coalition, diminishing support for al-Qaeda among Sunnis who opposed the coalition—even extremist militants. The violence between Sunnis and Shias only decreased after 2007, as the Islamic State of Iraq was weakened by greater retaliation from Muslims, and as the U.S. dramatically increased their troop numbers in Iraq in an attempt to stabilize the country. The Islamic State of Iraq became independent from al-Qaeda in 2013, and was renamed the 'Islamic State of Iraq and Syria', known as the 'Islamic State' (IS). IS continued its predecessor's terrorist attacks and conquests.

=== Continued manhunt ===
==== U.S. government activities, 2006–2009 ====
In July 2006, The New York Times revealed, based on anonymous CIA sources, that the Bin Laden Issue Station had been shut down in late 2005. In September 2006, the U.S. military revealed that al-Qaeda member Atiyah Abd al-Rahman had sent a letter to al-Zarqawi in December 2005—which was found in one of al-Zarqawi's Iraqi safe houses after his death—that indicated bin Laden and the rest of al-Qaeda's leadership were concurrently in the Waziristan region of Pakistan; al-Rahman instructed al-Zarqawi to send messengers to Waziristan so that they could meet with the other leaders. The letter indicated that the al-Qaeda organization had been weakened after experiencing various problems. U.S. and Afghan forces again raided the Tora Bora caves in August 2007, after receiving intelligence of a planned meeting between al-Qaeda members for before Ramadan. After killing dozens of al-Qaeda and Taliban members, they did not find either bin Laden or al-Zawahiri.

During Barack Obama's campaign for the 2008 U.S. presidential election, he pledged: "We will kill bin Laden. We will crush al-Qaeda. That has to be our biggest national security priority." As president, Obama rejected the Bush administration's strategy to focus on bin Laden's relation to other militant groups like Hamas or Hezbollah as part of the manhunt. Obama instead narrowed the U.S.'s focus onto al-Qaeda and its direct affiliates.

ABC News later wrote that "by the summer of 2009, the trail for bin Laden had gone cold. The CIA simply had no tangible evidence of any place he'd been since [the Battle of Tora Bora]." In December, U.S. Secretary of Defense Robert Gates stated that the U.S. had had no reliable information on the whereabouts of bin Laden in years. (Note: This was in response to a Taliban detainee in Pakistan recently telling authorities that bin Laden was in Afghanistan earlier in 2009. The detainee said that in January or February, he met a trusted associate who claimed he had seen bin Laden in Afghanistan about 15 to 20 days earlier. Gates said he could not confirm this story.) Days later, U.S. General Stanley McChrystal indicated that U.S. intelligence believed bin Laden was still alive. He also claimed that Obama's recent deployment of 30,000 extra troops to Afghanistan meant finding bin Laden was possible—and that, while killing or capturing bin Laden would not dissolve al-Qaeda, they definitely could not be dissolved while he was at large, as his survival had emboldened its members across the world.

==== Other claims about bin Laden's location ====
Shortly after the invasion of Afghanistan, ABC News quoted unnamed American officials as speculating that he would probably flee to Pakistan, but could also go to Somalia, Chechnya, Yemen, or Sudan. In 2002, Russian foreign minister Igor Ivanov suggested that bin Laden was hiding in Pankisi, Georgia, amid the Pankisi Gorge crisis.

In February 2009, a UCLA research team concluded, based on geographical analysis of satellite imagery, that three compounds in Parachinar, Khyber Pakhtunkhwa, were bin Laden's likely hideouts. In December, Pakistani prime minister Yusuf Raza Gilani rejected claims that bin Laden was in the country. Pakistan said that its intelligence resources were limited, and were thus focused on their war against the Pakistani Taliban and other insurgents, rather than finding bin Laden. In February 2010, Afghan president Hamid Karzai arrived in Saudi Arabia for diplomatic talks regarding the Taliban. During the visit, an anonymous official of the Saudi Foreign Affairs Ministry declared that the House of Saud had no intention to participate in peacemaking efforts in Afghanistan unless the Taliban severed ties with extremists and expelled bin Laden, allegedly under their protection. That June, Kuwaiti newspaper Al-Seyassah reported that bin Laden was hiding in the town of Sabzevar, Iran.

==== U.S. discovery of the Abbottabad compound ====
In August 2010, as U.S. intelligence was surveilling Abu Ahmad al-Kuwaiti, whom they knew to be a courier of bin Laden, in Khyber Pakhtunkhwa, al-Kuwaiti entered bin Laden's Abbottabad compound. He continued to frequently visit it under surveillance, and the U.S. eventually theorized that bin Laden was living inside it.

In July 2011, it was publicized that after the U.S. discovered the compound, to confirm bin Laden's occupancy, the CIA organized a campaign of free, secretly fake hepatitis B vaccinations in Khyber Pakhtunkhwa. They hoped one of bin Laden's relatives living with him would receive one, so that the CIA could then extract their DNA from their blood in the needle, and compare it to bin Laden's sister's DNA, which U.S. officials had obtained after she died in Boston in 2010. The operation ultimately failed, and its disclosure helped influence vaccine hesitancy in Pakistan, causing a rise in polio cases there.

== Death ==
The route of U.S. operatives in Operation Neptune Spear, according to U.S. officials

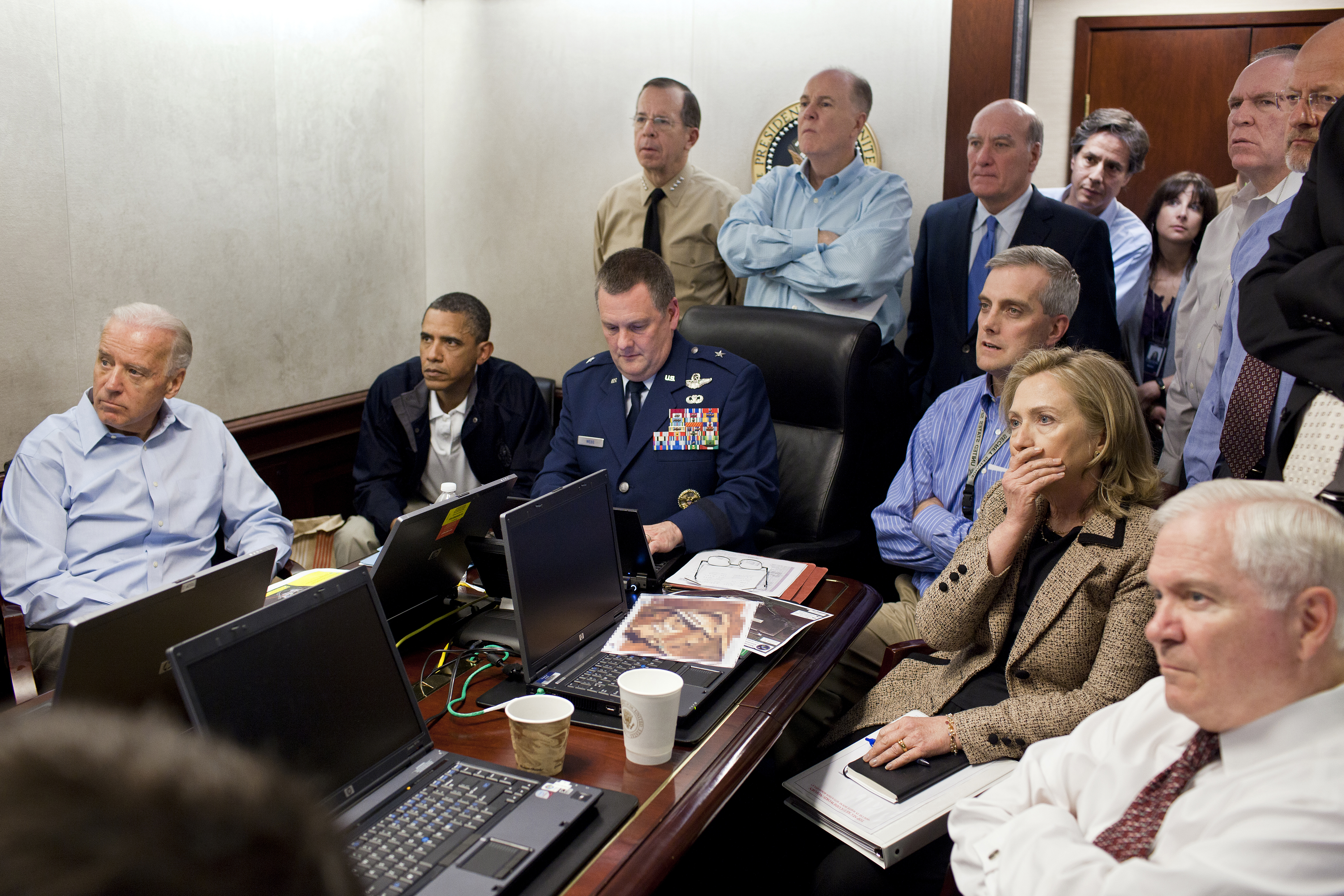
In the iconic photo Situation Room, members of the Obama administration track Operation Neptune Spear from the White House Situation Room

On 2 May 2011, bin Laden was shot and killed at his compound in Abbottabad, shortly after 1:00 a.m. PKT, in a raid by a U.S. military special operations unit. The raid, Operation Neptune Spear, was ordered by Obama that April, and carried out in a CIA operation by a team of U.S. Navy SEALs from SEAL Team Six, part of the Joint Special Operations Command. They were supported by CIA operatives on the ground. The raid was launched from Afghanistan.

Initially, it was widely reported by the press that bin Laden was fatally wounded by SEAL Robert J. O'Neill. However, this was discredited by witnesses, who claimed that bin Laden was possibly already dead by the time O'Neill arrived, having been injured by an anonymous SEAL nicknamed 'Red'. SEAL Matt Bissonnette claims that bin Laden died after Bissonnette and another SEAL shot him in the chest multiple times.

The SEALs took bin Laden's body with them out of Abbottabad. When detailing the raid to reporters, U.S. officials said that afterwards, his body was flown to Afghanistan for identification, then to the USS Carl Vinson in the Arabian Sea, from which it was buried at sea in accordance with Islamic customs. Subsequent reporting has called this account into question.

=== Aftermath ===
Upon the news of bin Laden's death, there were large celebrations outside the White House, and in New York City. The Washington Post described the Arab world's reaction as "muted". In Latin America, political leaders' views on his killing varied. Its supporters included Peru's then-leftist president Alan García, who labeled it "the first miracle performed by [the late] John Paul II" after being beatified the week prior; others denounced the U.S. for violating Pakistani sovereignty to perform the raid. In India, the revelation of possible ties between bin Laden and Pakistan's government caused "jubilation", as many residents felt it demonstrated a moral superiority of India over Pakistan, its historical adversary.

U.S. president Barack Obama announcing bin Laden's death

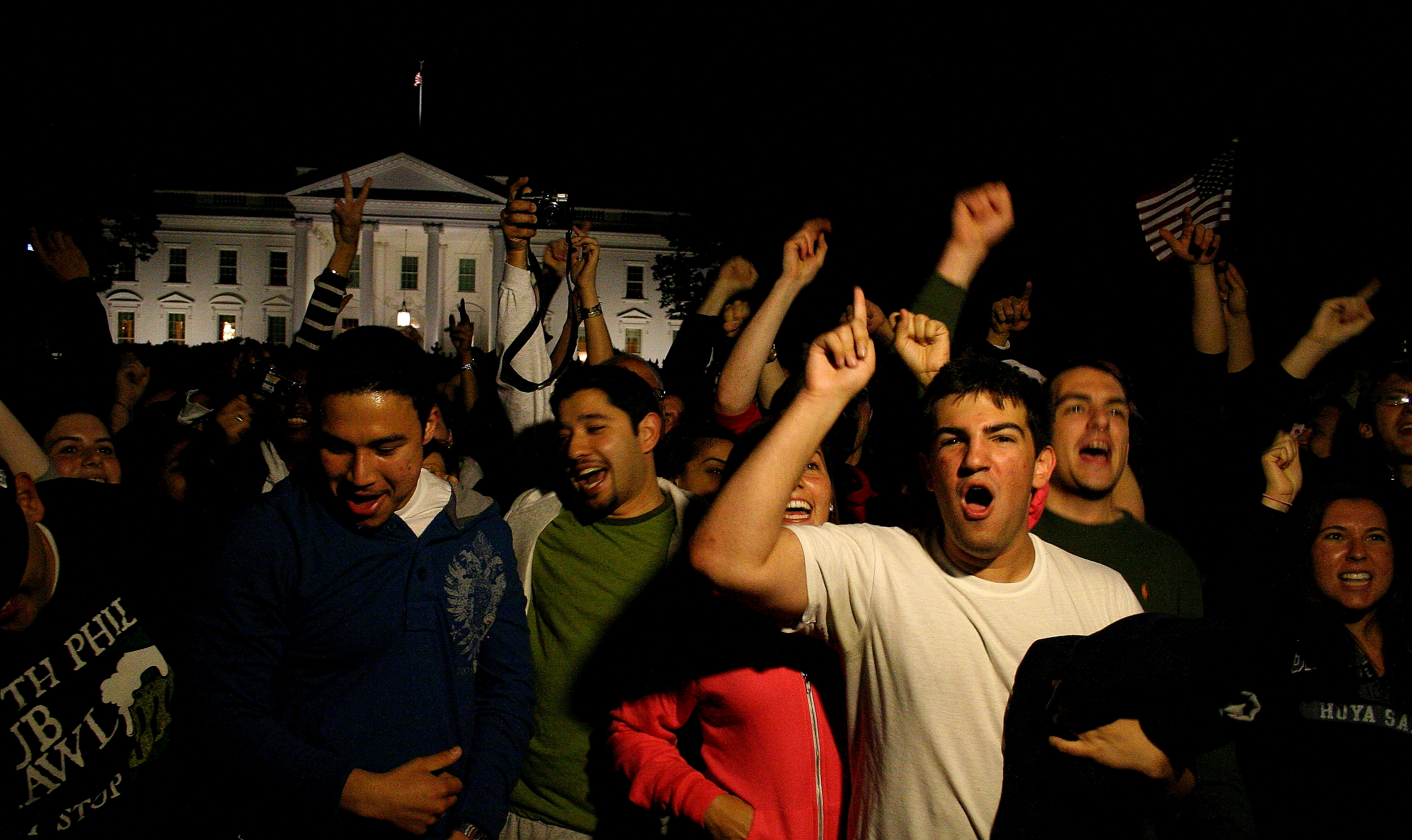
A celebration outside the White House that night

The U.S. claimed on 18 May that they would not pay anyone bin Laden's bounty reward of $25 million USD. On 15 June, U.S. federal prosecutors officially dropped all criminal charges against him. Ayman al-Zawahiri succeeded bin Laden as emir of al-Qaeda, and al-Qaeda's affiliates through Asia and Africa swore allegiance to him. He served until he was killed in 2022.

In 2012, Pakistan released an intelligence report detailing bin Laden's movements while he had lived in the country, based on interrogations of his three surviving wives. In 2016, released documents revealed that bin Laden had once asked family members to use for "jihad" the $29 million USD they were allegedly supposed to inherit from him upon his death. He said the money was in Sudan, but not if it was in cash or assets. It is not known if any family members ultimately received the money.

==== Controversy over alleged Pakistani support ====
In October 2010, an unnamed NATO official suggested that bin Laden was alive, well, and living comfortably in Pakistan, protected by elements of the country's intelligence services. A senior Pakistani official denied the allegations, claiming they were made up to put pressure on Pakistan ahead of talks aimed at strengthening ties between them and the U.S.

After bin Laden's death, Husain Haqqani, Pakistani ambassador to the U.S., promised a "full inquiry" into how the ISI could have failed to find bin Laden in a fortified compound so close to Islamabad: "Obviously bin Laden did have a support system. [Was] that support system within the government [of] Pakistan, or within the society of Pakistan?"

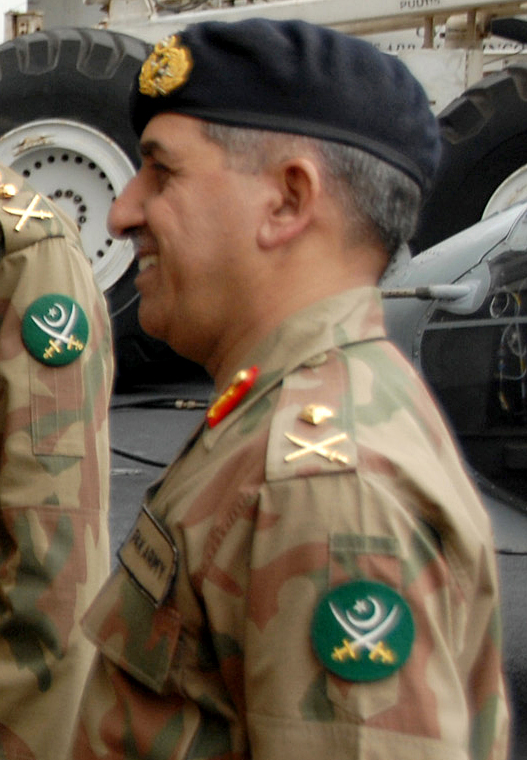
Ahmad Shuja Pasha, head of the Inter-Services Intelligence (ISI) from 2008 to 2012

For years, the U.S. and Pakistan dually maintained that no Pakistani officials had known of bin Laden's location, nor Operation Neptune Spear prior to Neptune Spear. Journalists gave conflicting views on these claims. Carlotta Gall reported in 2014 that Ahmad Shuja Pasha, while serving as head of the ISI from 2008 to 2012, knew of bin Laden's location—and in 2015, Seymour Hersh cited U.S. sources in reporting that:

1. Bin Laden was actually being held prisoner by the ISI at the Abbottabad compound since 2006
2. The CIA had learned of bin Laden's location from a former intelligence agent who had worked under Pasha
3. In exchange for the location, the agent was secretly paid much of the U.S.'s $25 million bounty reward
4. While heading the ISI, Pasha had known of Operation Neptune Spear in advance, and authorized the U.S.'s helicopters to enter Pakistani airspace during it

In contrast, Steve Coll wrote in 2018 that documents taken from the compound during the raid generally showed that he was wary of contacting Pakistani intelligence and police about various concerns, especially as Pakistan had arrested Khalid Sheikh Mohammed. Nelly Lahoud, who analyzed the documents seized during the operation to kill bin Laden, wrote that "even a casual reading of the [documents] makes it abundantly clear that [bin Laden] and his associates went to great lengths to hide from the Pakistani authorities", and it would be difficult to imagine that bin Laden himself did not know he was being held hostage.

In 2019, the U.S. and Pakistan's prior claims were contradicted by Imran Khan, Pakistani prime minister from 2018 to 2022, when he commented that the ISI had led the CIA to bin Laden: "[...] it was ISI that gave the information which led to the location of Osama bin Laden. If you ask CIA, it was ISI which gave the initial location through the phone connection." He did not explain this further.

== Personal life ==
Adult bin Laden was described as thin, tall, and weighing about 73 kilograms (160 lb). He usually walked with a cane, and may have had some type of kidney disease. (Note: He reportedly believed that consuming honey cures most ailments.) Nasser al-Bahri, bin Laden's bodyguard from 1997 to 2001, described him as a frugal man and a strict father, who took his family to picnics in the desert, and did recreational shooting with them. Al-Bahri said that bin Laden once played association football and volleyball, and that when the two knew each other, bin Laden was obsessed with black horses, and the English football club Arsenal. Bin Laden also wrote jihadist poetry. (Note: Perhaps relevant to bin Laden's interests, in 2017, the CIA released 470,000 computer files that were on hard drives in the Abbottabad compound, taken during the raid. The files included movies, TV shows, and video games which had been pirated online. Many were either anime-themed, or pornographic. For most of the files, it is not known which were used by bin Laden or the other occupants of the compound.)

In 1974, bin Laden married Najwa Ghanem, his first cousin. They had eleven children, and separated days before 9/11. In 1983, he married Khadijah Sharif. They had three children, then divorced in 1993. He married Khairiah Sabir in 1985, and they had a son, Hamza, who may now be an al-Qaeda leader. (Note: At least prior to 2019, Hamza was working as a terrorist for al-Qaeda. In 2019, U.S. president Donald Trump claimed that the U.S. had killed him in a drone strike; then, unconfirmed reports from 2024 said that Hamza was still alive, and heading al-Qaeda operations in Afghanistan.) Osama married Siham Sabir in 1987, and they had four children. (Note: One of them, Khalid, was also killed in the Abbottabad raid.) His fifth marriage was to an unnamed woman in 1996; it was annulled within days of the ceremony. In 2000, he married Amal al-Sadah, and they had five children.

Bin Laden's wives and children
Najwa Ghanem married 1974 divorced 2001	Khadijah Sharif married 1983 divorced 1993	Khairiah Sabir married 1985	Siham Sabir married 1987	Unnamed married, marriage annulled 1996	Amal al-Sadah married 2000
Abdallah ♂ (b. 1976); Abdul Al-Rahman ♂ (b. 1978); Saad ♂ (1979–2009); Omar ♂ (b. 1981); Osman ♂ (b. 1983); Muhammad ♂ (b. 1985); Fatima ♀ (b. 1987); Iman ♀ (b. 1990); Ladin "Bakir" ♂ (b. 1993); Rukhaiya ♀ (b. 1997); Nour ♀ (b. 1999 or 2000)	Ali ♂ (b. 1984 or 1986); Amer ♂ (b. 1990); Aisha ♀ (b. 1992)	Hamza ♂ (b. 1989 or 1991, possibly died in 2019)	Kadhija ♀ (1989–2009); Khalid ♂ (1989–2011); Miriam ♀ (b. 1990); Sumaiya ♀ (b. 1992)	None	Safiyah ♀ (b. 2001); Aasia ♀ (b. 2003); Ibrahim ♂ (b. 2004); Zainab ♀ (b. 2006); Hussain ♂ (b. 2008)

== Legacy ==
In the West, bin Laden is overwhelmingly regarded as a terrorist and mass murderer, and news organizations have referred to him as the "most famous terrorist" before and after his death. His New York Times obituary wrote that Americans generally viewed him as the main symbol of global terrorism, and equivalent to Adolf Hitler or Joseph Stalin.

His popularity among Muslims peaked during the Iraq War between 2003 to 2011, as opinion polls showed that about 50 to 60% of people in certain Muslim countries viewed him favorably. The New York Times summarized a 2004 poll of Saudis' opinions on him: "yes to bin Laden rhetoric, no to al-Qaeda violence". Upon bin Laden's death, the Pew Research Center found that he had generally become "discredited" to his Arab supporters over the preceding years, according to polling. In 2020, Imran Khan denounced bin Laden's killing, labeling it "an embarrassing moment" in Pakistan's history. He praised bin Laden as a "martyr".

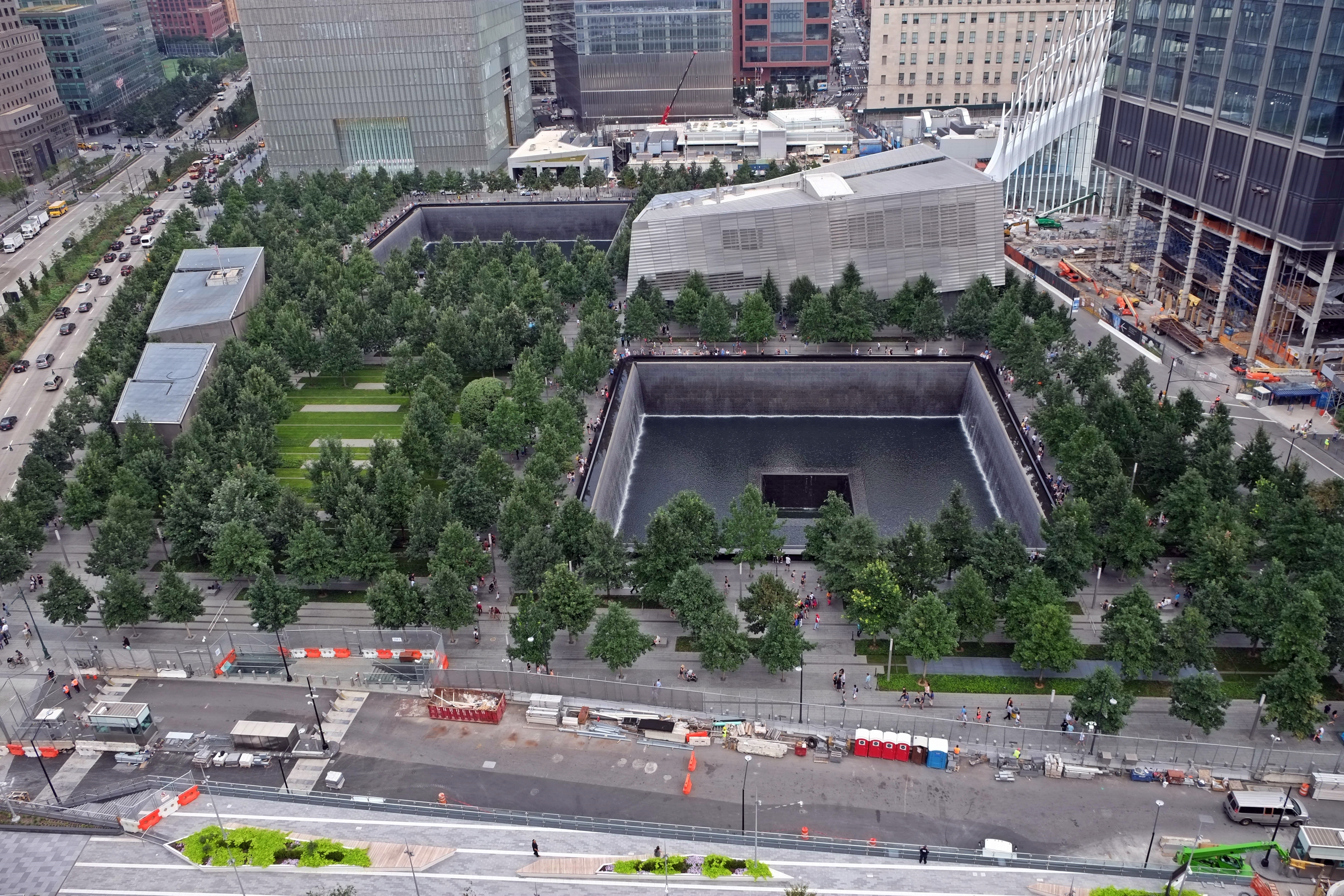
The National September 11 Memorial & Museum in Lower Manhattan; two reflecting pools mark the sites of the former Twin Towers

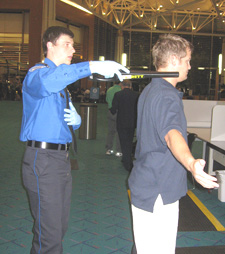
A Transportation Security Administration agent screening an airline passenger at a U.S. airport in 2010

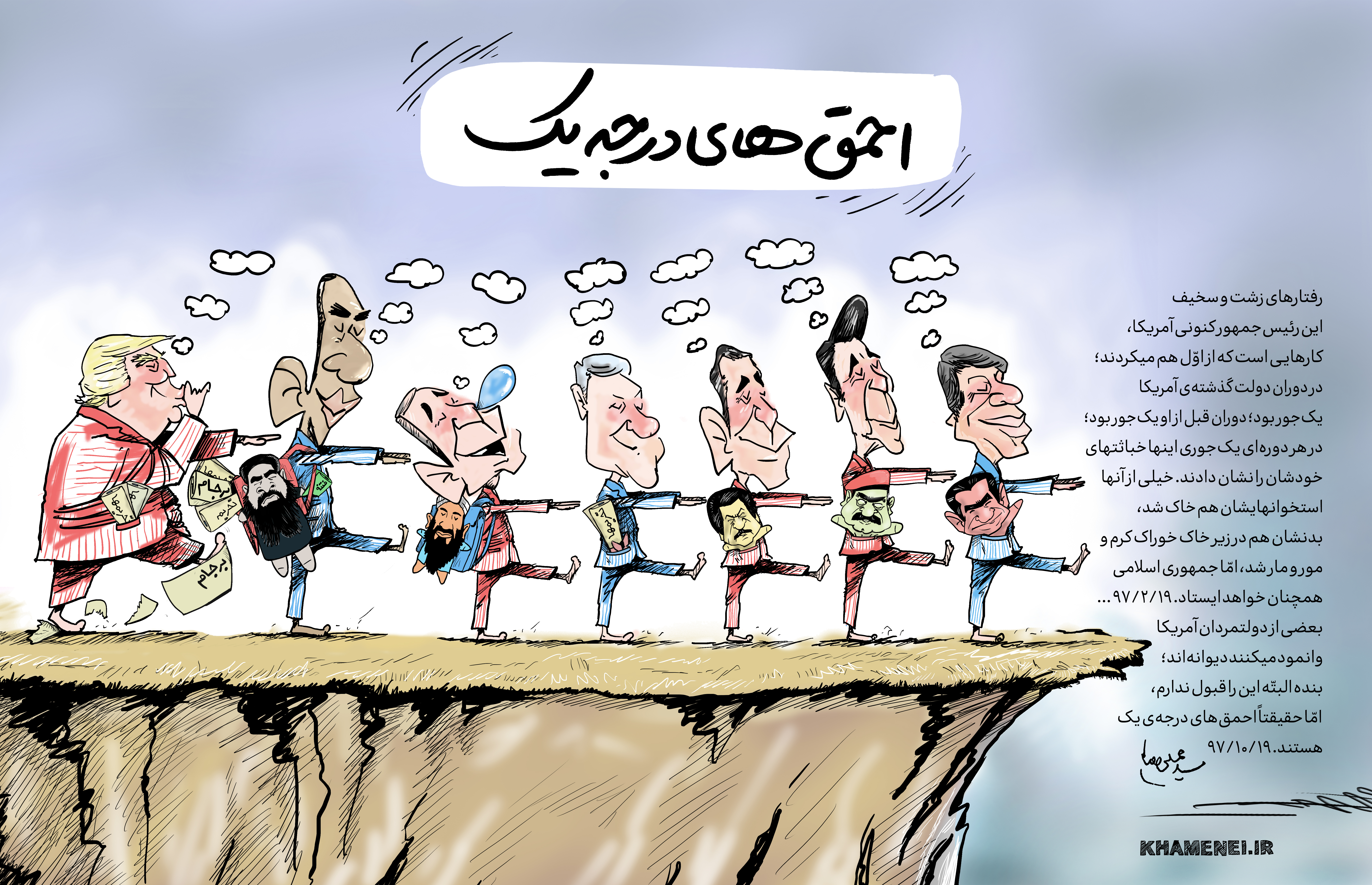
A 2019 cartoon published on then-Iranian leader Ali Khamenei's website, showing recent U.S. presidents sleepwalking off a cliff; George W. Bush (third from left) carries a toy of bin Laden

== See also ==
- List of assassinations by the United States
- Gary Brooks Faulkner, an American construction worker who attempted to kill bin Laden in Pakistan
- Osama bin Laden (elephant)
