= Bin Laden (disambiguation) =

Osama bin Laden (1957–2011) was a Saudi-born terrorist and the co-founder and general emir of al-Qaeda.

bin Laden or Bin Laden may also refer to:

== People ==
- Bin Laden family, Saudi business family
  - Abdallah bin Laden (born 1976), Saudi businessman and son of Osama bin Laden
  - Bakr bin Laden (born 1946), Saudi businessman and half-brother of Osama bin Laden
  - Hamza bin Laden (1989 – c. 2019), Saudi al-Qaeda figure and son of Osama bin Laden
  - Mohammed bin Awad bin Laden (1908–1967), Saudi businessman who amassed the bin Laden family fortune, father of Osama bin Laden
  - Omar bin Laden (born 1981), Saudi son of Osama bin Laden
  - Saad bin Laden (1979–2009), Saudi al-Qaeda figure and son of Osama bin Laden
  - Salem bin Laden (1946–1988), Saudi former head of the bin Laden family and brother of Osama bin Laden
  - Tarek bin Laden (born 1947), Saudi businessman and half-brother of Osama bin Laden
  - Wafah Dufour (née bin Laden; born 1975), American model and niece of Osama bin Laden
  - Yeslam bin Ladin (born 1950), Swiss businessman and the half-brother of Al-Qaeda leader
- MC Bin Laden (born 1994), Brazilian singer and songwriter
- Tom Adam alias Bin Laden, former Central African warlord
- Osama Vinladen (pronounced Binladen; born 2002), Peruvian footballer
- Wirathu (born 1968), Burmese Buddhist monk sometimes labelled "Burmese Bin Laden" for intolerance towards Muslims

== Other uses ==
- Osama bin Laden (elephant), an elephant that killed at least 27 people in India from 2004 to 2006
- "Bin Laden" (song), a 2005 hip hop song by Immortal Technique and Mos Def
- bin Laden, a nickname for the 500 euro note
- Tere Bin Laden, a 2010 Indian satirical film about the terrorist
  - Tere Bin Laden: Dead or Alive, a 2016 sequel
