= James R. Bath =

American businessman

- Born: James Reynolds Bath; August 18, 1936 (age 90); Natchitoches, Louisiana, U.S.
- Occupation: Businessman

James Reynolds Bath (born August 18, 1936) is a Texas businessman who has business interests in aircraft sales and leasing and real estate. He is best known for his business relationships with Saudi businessmen Salem bin Laden and Khalid bin Mahfouz.

== Biography ==
Bath was born in 1936 in Natchitoches, Louisiana. In 1965, he moved to Houston, where he became an aircraft broker.

In 1975, Bath met Salem bin Laden when bin Laden was interested in purchasing a used aircraft. Salem bin Laden was the son of Mohammed bin Laden, founder of the Saudi Binladin Group, one of the largest construction companies in the world. Through this acquaintance, Bath eventually became bin Laden's business representative in the United States, representing him in a number of business deals, including real estate, aircraft services, and banking. Through bin Laden, Bath also met Khalid bin Mahfouz, the son of Salem Bin Mahfouz, founder of National Commercial Bank, now the largest bank in Saudi Arabia, and for a time represented him as well.

== Bath and George W. Bush ==
Bath is an acquaintance of former president George W. Bush, whom he met when both men were serving in the Texas Air National Guard in the early 1970s. After Bush started his first business, Arbusto Energy, Bath invested $50,000 in the firm. A former business partner of Bath, Charles White, who was involved in a number of suits against Bath, claimed in a 2003 interview with Canadian Broadcasting Corporation that the investment in fact came from bin Mahfouz and bin Laden, and amounted to over a million dollars, reiterating allegations that previously appeared in Pete Brewton's The Mafia, CIA, and George Bush (1992), and later in The Outlaw Bank, a 1993 book regarding the Bank of Credit and Commerce International (BCCI) authored by Time journalists S.C. Gwynne and Jonathan Beaty. Both Bush and Bath have denied this, and according to journalist Craig Unger, who examined the relationship between the Bushes and Saudi financiers in his 2004 book House of Bush, House of Saud, there is no evidence to support it. Similar conclusions have been reached by journalist Steve Coll in his 2008 book The Bin Ladens: An Arabian Family in the American Century.
