= Personal life of Osama bin Laden =

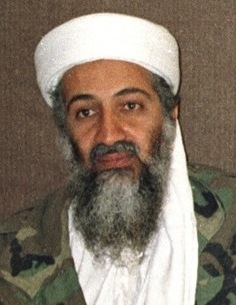
Osama bin Laden in November 2001

Osama bin Laden, the founder of the al-Qaeda terrorist organization, was raised as a devout Sunni Muslim. He believed Muslims should kill civilians and military personnel from the United States and allied countries until they withdrew support for Israel and withdrew military forces from the Muslim world. He was indicted in United States federal court for his involvement in the 1998 U.S. embassy bombings in Dar es Salaam, Tanzania and Nairobi, Kenya, and was on the U.S. Federal Bureau of Investigation's Ten Most Wanted Fugitives list.

In 1974, at the age of 17, bin Laden married his first wife Najwa Ghanem at Latakia, Syria. Osama bin Laden married at least four other women; he fathered 24 children.

== Childhood ==
Osama bin Mohammed bin Awad bin Laden was born in Riyadh, Saudi Arabia. In a 1998 interview with Al Jazeera, he gave his birth date as 10 March 1957. His father was Mohammed bin Laden, from Yemen. Before World War I, Mohammed had emigrated from Hadhramaut, on the south coast of Yemen, to the Red Sea port of Jeddah, Saudi Arabia, where he began to work as a porter. Starting his own business in 1930, Mohammed built his fortune as a building contractor for the Saudi royal family during the 1950s. Though there is no definitive account of the number of children born to Mohammed bin Laden, it is generally put at 58. Mohammed bin Laden was married 22 times, although to no more than four women at a time per Sharia. Osama was the only son of Mohammed bin Laden and his tenth wife, Hamida al-Attas, née Alia Ghanem, who was from Syria. His maternal family is Alawite.

== Education and radicalization ==
Osama bin Laden was raised as a devout Sunni Muslim. Bin Laden's father ensured that he was regularly attending school. Bin Laden attended schools with some Western curricula and culture. No evidence has been found that he ever received full-time education in a religious madrasa. He was likely educated for some of his primary school years in Syria and that may have been in connection to his mother's frequent visits to Latakia, Syria. By the time bin Laden was an 8th grader, "he was a solid if unspectacular student". His mother remembered that he was "not an A student. He would pass exams with average grades."

In the mid-1960s, bin Laden briefly attended Brummana High School, a Quaker institution in Brummana, Lebanon, along with several of his half brothers. Five former administrators and students said he attended for less than a year before returning home; they did not say or recall why he left, but his leaving was not due to poor behavior or grades. Renee Bazz, a former administrative staff member, said that bin Laden went to another school in Lebanon before he attended Brummana. British comedian and journalist Dom Joly claimed on an episode of BBC's Would I Lie To You? that he attended the school with bin Laden, with Osama being a senior and Joly being in elementary school.

He seems to have stayed in Latakia for a period. He moved back to Jeddah in the following September. From 1968 to 1976 he attended Al Thager academy. Bin Laden was probably in the fifth or sixth grade when he began attending school. In the 1960s, King Faisal had welcomed exiled teachers from Syria, Egypt, and Jordan, so that by the early seventies it was common to find members of the Muslim Brotherhood teaching at Saudi schools and universities, and bin Laden was taught by some of these and influenced by their political ideology.

Bin Laden earned a degree in civil engineering in 1979 from King Abdulaziz University in Jeddah. Despite his major subject, at university his main interest was religion; he was involved in both interpreting the Quran and charitable work. A close friend reports, "we read Sayyid Qutb. He was the one who most affected our generation." Qutb, author of Ma'alim fi-l-Tariq, or Milestones, one of the most influential tracts on the importance of jihad against all that is un-Islamic in the world, was deceased, but his brother and publicizer of his work, Muhammad Qutb, lectured regularly at the university. So did another charismatic Muslim Brotherhood member, Abdallah Azzam, an Islamic scholar from Palestine who was instrumental in building pan-Islamic enthusiasm for jihad against the Soviets in Afghanistan and in drawing Muslims (like Osama) from all over the Middle East to fight there.

Bin Laden was described by University friend Jamal Khalifa as extremely religious. Neither man watched films or listened to popular music, because they believed such activities went against the teachings of the Qur'an. During his University career he witnessed many world-changing events, especially in 1979, when Ruhollah Khomeini and his followers overthrew Iran’s Western-supported government to install a Shia Islamist state, and then when radicals seized the Grand Mosque in Mecca and the Saudi government could not retake the mosque without resorting to seeking Western aid. It was not until the French special forces came in that the government was able to regain control of Mecca’s holiest site. Bin Laden was disgusted with his government’s inability to protect the sacred city, and he began to see the royal family more and more as corrupt. Finally, he ended 1979 ready to fight off the invading Soviets in Afghanistan.

In regard to his Islamic learning, bin Laden was sometimes referred to as a "sheikh", considered by some to be "well versed in the classical scriptures and traditions of Islam", and was said to have been mentored by scholars such as Musa al-Qarni. He had no formal training in Islamic jurisprudence, however, and was criticized by Islamic scholars as having no standing to issue religious opinions (fatwa).

Bin Laden is reported to have married at least five women, although he later divorced the first two. Three of Osama bin Laden's wives were university lecturers, highly educated, from distinguished families. According to Wisal al Turabi, bin Laden married them because they were "spinsters", who "were going to go without marrying in this world. So he married them for the Word of God". His known wives were:

1. Najwa Ghanem (born 1958), a Syrian, also known as Umm Abdullah (mother of Abdullah). As his first cousin, Najwa was "promised" in marriage to bin Laden. Bin Laden married her in 1974 in Latakia in northwestern Syria. After the birth of their first son, Abdullah, they moved from his mother's house to a building in the Al-Aziziyah district of Jeddah. She is the mother of eleven of his children, including the late Saad bin Laden. She co-authored Growing Up bin Laden with her son Omar. Her children did not like life in Khartoum and even less life in Afghanistan. She left bin Laden on 9 September 2001, just before the 11 September event, the year after his marriage to Amal al-Sadah. She returned to Syria to live in her home city of Latakia for a time. Her father is the brother of bin Laden's mother, Hamida al-Attas (born Alia Ghanem).
2. Khadijah Sharif (born 1948), also known as Umm Ali (mother of Ali). She was a university lecturer who studied and worked in Saudi Arabia. Umm Ali bin Laden spent holidays in Khartoum, Sudan, where bin Laden later settled during his exile in the years 1991 to 1996. According to Wisal al Turabi, the wife of Sudanese politician Hassan Turabi, Umm Ali taught Islam to some families in Riyadh, an upscale neighborhood in Khartoum. According to Abu Jandal, bin Laden's former chief bodyguard, while living in Sudan, Umm Ali asked bin Laden for a divorce because she said that she "could not continue to live in an austere way and in hardship".
3. Khairiah Sabir (born 1949 or 1950), also known as Umm Hamza (mother of Hamza). A child psychologist with a PhD in Islamic studies, she was reportedly bin Laden's favorite wife, and the most mature, being seven years his senior. She had only one child, a son. Though she had a frail constitution and was not beautiful, she was from "a wealthy and distinguished family", exuded a "regal quality", and "was deeply committed to the jihadi cause". She was living in bin Laden's compound in Abbottabad, Pakistan at the time of bin Laden's death.
4. Siham Sabir (born 1956 or 1957), also known as Umm Khaled (mother of Khaled). A teacher of Arabic grammar, she kept her university job and commuted to Saudi Arabia during their time in Sudan. She was living in bin Laden's compound in Abbottabad, Pakistan at the time of bin Laden's death.
5. Amal Ahmed al-Sadah (born March 27, 1982) was bin Laden's youngest wife. Born Amal Ahmed Abdul Fattah in Yemen, she married bin Laden in June 2000. Bin Laden sought the marriage with Amal partly to help prepare a possible refuge for him in Yemen should he become unwelcome in Afghanistan. Bin Laden commissioned Rashad Mohammed Saeed Ismael to choose the bride and arrange the marriage. Amal al-Sadah was living in the compound in Abbottabad, Pakistan at the time of bin Laden's death, along with Siham Sabir and Khairiah Sabir, two other wives of bin Laden. She was injured in the calf in the raid.

On 27 April 2012, the three widows as well as seven children and four grandchildren of Osama bin Laden were deported to Saudi Arabia from the Pakistani capital, Islamabad. In Saudi Arabia, they all remained in Jeddah, where the head of the bin Laden family, Bakr bin Laden provided them with three houses in the bin Laden subdivision there.

== Children ==
Bin Laden fathered 24 children. The children of his first wife, Najwa, include Abdallah (born 1976), Omar, Saad and Mohammed. His son Mohammed bin Laden (born 1985) married the daughter of the former al-Qaeda military chief Mohammed Atef (also called Abu Hafs) in January 2001, at Kandahar.

Bin Laden's wives and children
Najwa Ghanem married 1974 divorced 2001	Khadijah Sharif married 1983 divorced 1993	Khairiah Sabir married 1985	Siham Sabir married 1987	Unnamed married, marriage annulled 1996	Amal al-Sadah married 2000
Abdallah ♂ (b. 1976); Abdul Al-Rahman ♂ (b. 1978); Saad ♂ (1979–2009); Omar ♂ (b. 1981); Osman ♂ (b. 1983); Muhammad ♂ (b. 1985); Fatima ♀ (b. 1987); Iman ♀ (b. 1990); Ladin "Bakir" ♂ (b. 1993); Rukhaiya ♀ (b. 1997); Nour ♀ (b. 1999 or 2000)	Ali ♂ (b. 1984 or 1986); Amer ♂ (b. 1990); Aisha ♀ (b. 1992)	Hamza ♂ (b. 1989 or 1991, possibly died in 2019)	Kadhija ♀ (1989–2009); Khalid ♂ (1989–2011); Miriam ♀ (b. 1990); Sumaiya ♀ (b. 1992)	None	Safiyah ♀ (b. 2001); Aasia ♀ (b. 2003); Ibrahim ♂ (b. 2004); Zainab ♀ (b. 2006); Hussain ♂ (b. 2008)

== Appearance, hobbies, and behavior ==
Osama bin Laden was tall and thin. In 2001, the FBI gave a height estimate of between 6 feet 4 inches (1.93 m) and 6 feet 6 inches (1.98 m) and a weight estimate of about 160 pounds (73 kg). Upon his death, Admiral Bill McRaven, who oversaw his killing confirmed that bin Laden appeared to be 6 feet 4 inches. Interviewees of Lawrence Wright, on the other hand, usually described him as around six feet tall.

He had an olive complexion, was left-handed, and in later life he usually walked with a cane. He usually wore a plain white turban, but sometimes wore the traditional Saudi male headdress, generally white.

In terms of personality, bin Laden was described as a soft-spoken, mild mannered man. His soft voice was also a function of necessity. Interviews with reporters had reportedly left his vocal cords inflamed and bin Laden unable to speak the following day. Bin Laden’s bodyguard contended that Soviet chemical weapons were to blame.

Author Adam Robinson has alleged that bin Laden supported Arsenal Football Club, visiting the team's stadium twice when he visited London in 1994.

Bin Laden may have been an enthusiast for Western and Eastern Asian media and pop culture as the files found in his hard drive in Pakistan included a video called "HORSE_DANCE," wildlife documentaries, a copy of Charlie Bit My Finger, the animated films Batman: Gotham Knight and Antz, episodes of Jackie Chan Adventures, Tom and Jerry, Naruto, Bleach, Dragon Ball, and Case Closed, the entire series collection of Devil May Cry: The Animated Series, as well as copies of the video games Final Fantasy VII, Devil May Cry, Counter-Strike, Grand Theft Auto: Chinatown Wars, Half-Life 2 and Resident Evil 2. However, the files may have come from other residents of the compound, or previous owners of the devices, and not necessarily bin Laden. There were also, reportedly, several pornographic video games and videos, although the Central Intelligence Agency has not released specifics and withheld certain titles, citing copyright concerns.

Bin Laden's "wealth and generosity ... simplicity of ... behaviour, personal charm and ... bravery in battle" have been described as "legendary." According to Michael Scheuer, bin Laden claims to speak only Arabic. In a 1998 interview, he had the English questions translated into Arabic. But others, such as Rhimaulah Yusufzai and Peter Bergen, believe he understood English.

Bin Laden had been praised for his self-denial, despite his great wealth – or former great wealth. While living in Sudan, a lamb was slaughtered and cooked every evening at his home for guests, but bin Laden "ate very little himself, preferring to nibble what his guests left on their plates, believing that these abandoned morsels would gain the favor of God."

Bin Laden was said to have "consciously modeled himself" since childhood "on certain features of the Prophet's life", using "the fingers of his right hand," rather than a spoon when eating, believing it to be sunnah: "the way the Prophet did it, ... choosing to fast on the days that Prophet fasted, to wear clothes similar to those the Prophet may have worn, even to sit and to eat in the same postures that tradition ascribes to him."

At the same time, other actions of his were motivated by concern for appearances. Bin Laden was known for his media savvy, using the Islamic imagery of the cave in Tora Bora "as a way of identifying himself with the prophet in the minds of many Muslims," despite the fact the caves in question were tunnels dug with the modern technology of earth moving machinery to store ammunition. He had dyed his beard to cover the streaks of gray. In 2001, he restaged a recitation of a poem intended for Arab television when he was not satisfied with the original video results done before an audience at his son's wedding dinner. The second take, done the next day after the wedding was over, had a handful of supporters crying in praise to simulate the noise of the full room the day before. "His image management extended to asking one of the reporters, who had taken a digital snapshot, to take another picture because his neck was 'too full'".

== See also ==
- Osama bin Laden's compound in Abbottabad § CIA cache of computer files
