= Steve Coll bibliography =

List of works by or about Steve Coll, American journalist.

== Books ==
- Coll, Steve (1986). The Deal of the Century: The Breakup of AT&T. New York: Atheneum.
- — (1987). The Taking of Getty Oil: The Full Story of the Most Spectacular & Catastrophic Takeover of All Time. Scribner.
- — (1988) [1986]. The Deal of the Century: The Breakup of AT&T (Touchstone paperback ed.). New York: Simon & Schuster.
- Vise, David A. & Steve Coll (1991). Eagle on the Street: Based on the Pulitzer Prize–Winning Account of the SEC's Battle with Wall Street. New York: Scribner's.
- Coll, Steve (1993). On the Grand Trunk Road: A Journey into South Asia. Crown Press.
- — (2004). Ghost Wars: The Secret History of the CIA, Afghanistan and Bin Laden, from the Soviet Invasion to September 10, 2001. Penguin.
- — (2005). Ghost Wars: The Secret History of the CIA, Afghanistan and Bin Laden, from the Soviet Invasion to September 10, 2001. Penguin. ISBN 9780141020808.
- — (2008). The Bin Ladens: An Arabian family in the American Century. Penguin.
- — (2012). Private Empire: ExxonMobil and American Power. Penguin.
- — (2018). Directorate S: The C.I.A. and America's Secret Wars in Afghanistan and Pakistan, 2001–2016. Penguin Press.
- — (2024). The Achilles Trap: Saddam Hussein, the C.I.A., and the Origins of America’s Invasion of Iraq. Penguin Press.

== Essays and reporting ==
- Coll, Steve (November 21, 2005). "Fault lines". Letter from Kashmir. The New Yorker.
- — (December 12, 2005). "Young Osama : how he learned radicalism, and may have seen America". Letter from Jedda. The New Yorker. 81 (40): 48–51, 59–61.
- — (November 10, 2008). "The test". The Talk of the Town. Comment. The New Yorker. 84 (36): 29–30.
- — (October 26, 2009). "War and Politics". The Talk of the Town. Comment. The New Yorker. 85 (34): 31–32.
- — (May 24, 2010). "War by other means : is it possible to negotiate with the Taliban?". Letter from Afghanistan. The New Yorker. 86 (14): 42–53.
- — (October 11, 2010). "Behind Closed Doors". The Talk of the Town. Comment. The New Yorker. 86 (31): 35–36.
- — (November 8, 2010). "Leaks". The Talk of the Town. Comment. The New Yorker. 86 (35): 27–28.
- — (April 4, 2011). "The Casbah Coalition". Letter from Tunis. The New Yorker. 87 (7): 34–40.
- — (March 4, 2013). "Name calling". The Talk of the Town. Comment. The New Yorker. 89 (3): 17–18.
- — (April 1, 2013). "The spy who said too much : why the Administration targeted a C.I.A. officer". The Political Scene. The New Yorker. 89 (7): 54–63. John Kiriakou
- — (May 6, 2013). "Remote control : our drone delusion". The Critics. Books. The New Yorker. 89 (12): 76–79.
- — (June 10–17, 2013). "The President and the press". The Talk of the Town. Comment. The New Yorker. 89 (17): 39–40.
- — (July 1, 2013). "Options". The Talk of the Town. Comment. The New Yorker. 89 (19): 19–20.
- — (November 4, 2013). "Party crashers". The Talk of the Town. Comment. The New Yorker. 89 (35): 37–38.
- — (February 10, 2014). "On the trail". The Talk of the Town. Comment. The New Yorker. 89 (48): 19–20.
- — (March 24, 2014). "The Senator vs. the C.I.A." The Talk of the Town. Comment. The New Yorker. 90 (5): 31–32.
- — (April 6, 2015). "A calculated risk". The Talk of the Town. Comment. The New Yorker. 91 (7): 17–18.
- — (May 25, 2015). "Saudi shakeup". The Talk of the Town. Comment. The New Yorker. 91 (14): 23–24.
- — (July 27, 2015). "The deal". The Talk of the Town. Comment. The New Yorker. 91 (21): 17–18.
- — (April 11, 2016). "Global Trump". The New Yorker.
- — (August 8–15, 2016). "Defying conventions". The Talk of the Town. Comment. The New Yorker. 92 (24): 19–20.
- — (September 5, 2016). "Assad's War on Aleppo". The New Yorker.
- — (October 3, 2016). "A Season of Terror and Donald Trump". The New Yorker.
- — (February 6, 2017). "Info Wars". The New Yorker.
- — (April 17, 2017). "Trump's Confusing Strike on Syria". The New Yorker.
- — (June 26, 2017). "An Unquiet Week in Washington". The New Yorker.
- — (October 2, 2017). "The Madman Theory of North Korea". The New Yorker.
- — (November 13, 2017). "The Trump Administration's Looming Political Crisis". The New Yorker.
- — (December 11, 2017). "Donald Trump's "Fake News" Tactics". The New Yorker.
- — (March 4, 2019). "The Jail Health-Care Crisis". A Reporter at Large. The New Yorker. 95 (2): 28–37.
- — (September 21, 2020). "The unpopular vote". The Talk of the Town. Comment. The New Yorker. 96 (28): 11, 14.
- — (May 31, 2021). "Ceasefire and Impasse". The Talk of the Town. Comment. The New Yorker. 97 (14): 13–14.
- — (September 13, 2021). "Defeat". The Talk of the Town. Comment. The New Yorker. 97 (28): 13–14.

== Contributions on newyorker.com ==
- Coll, Steve (December 2, 2016). "Travelling with James Mattis, Donald Trump's Pick for Secretary of Defense". The New Yorker.
- — (December 11, 2016). "Rex Tillerson, from a Corporate Oil Sovereign to the State Department". The New Yorker.
- — (January 18, 2017). "The Strongman Problem, from Modi to Trump". The New Yorker.
- — (February 1, 2017). "The Many Dangers of Donald Trump's Executive Order". The New Yorker.
- — (February 22, 2017). "What Trump Means for the World's Poorest People". The New Yorker.
- — (March 7, 2017). "Donald Trump Meets the Surveillance State". The New Yorker.
- — (March 30, 2017). "Rex Tillerson Is Still Acting Like a C.E.O." The New Yorker.
- — (April 18, 2017). "Facebook and the Murderer". The New Yorker.
- — (June 6, 2017). "While Trump Tweets, Assad and Putin Advance in Syria". The New Yorker.
- — (June 29, 2017). "How Can the Qatar Crisis Be Resolved?". The New Yorker.
- — (July 20, 2017). "A Deportation at M.I.T., and New Risks for the Undocumented". The New Yorker.
- — (August 10, 2017). "The Trump Administration Rolls Back Anti-Corruption Efforts in the Oil Industry". The New Yorker.
- — (August 23, 2017). "The Taliban's Response to Trump's Afghanistan Address". The New Yorker.
- — (August 31, 2017). "Things to Think About When Taking Down Statues". The New Yorker.
- — (November 8, 2017). "When a Day in Court Is a Trap for Immigrants". The New Yorker.
