= Laden =

Ladan is a Somali girl's name meaning "healthy, well-off". Laden or Ladan may refer to:

== People ==
=== Surname ===
- Abdulaziz Ladan (born 1991), Saudi Arabian middle-distance runner
- Anthony Laden, American philosopher
- Bob Laden (fl. 1970–1997), makeup artist
- Chelsea Laden] (born 1992), American television creator and ice hockey goaltender
- Francine Laden, American epidemiologist
- Greg Laden, American biological anthropologist and science blogger
- bin Laden family, used as a surname in the Western context, meaning son of "Laden"
  - Osama bin Laden (1957–2011), Saudi founder of al-Qaeda

=== Given name ===
- Ladan Bijani (1974–2003), Iranian conjoined twin
- Laden Gamiet (born 1978), South African cricketer
- Ladan Mostofi (1972), Iranian actress
- Ladan Osman (Somali: Ladan Cismaan, Arabic: لدن عثمان), Somali-American poet and teacher

== Places ==
- Ladan, Chernihiv Oblast, an urban-type settlement in Chernihiv Oblast of Ukraine

== See also ==
- Ladin (disambiguation)
- bin Laden (disambiguation)
