= Abdallah bin Laden =

Son of Osama bin Laden (born 1976)

Abdallah bin Laden عبدالله بن لادن
- Born: Abdallah bin Osama bin Mohammed bin 'Awad bin Laden; 1976 (age 49–50)
- Parent(s): Osama bin Laden; Najwa Ghanem
- Relatives: Saad bin Laden (brother); Omar bin Laden (brother); Hamza bin Laden (half-brother); Mohammed bin Laden (grandfather); Hamida al-Attas (grandmother)

Abdallah bin Osama bin Mohammed bin 'Awad bin Laden (Arabic: عبدالله بن أسامة بن محمد بن عوض بن لادن; born 1976) is the eldest son of militant leader Osama bin Laden and Osama's first wife, a Syrian woman named Najwa Ghanem. He is not to be confused with at least three other 'Abdullah bin Ladens: Osama bin Laden's half-brother Abdullah bin Mohammed bin Laden (born 1966), nor Osama's uncle 'Abdullah bin 'Awad bin Laden (c. 1913-2002), nor Osama's cousin, another 'Abdullah bin 'Awad bin Laden, who was possibly the son of one of Osama's aunts, and was the director of the U.S. branch of the World Assembly of Muslim Youth (WAMY), located in Virginia, from 1992 to 2002.

== Early life ==
'Abdallah bin Osama bin Laden was born in Jeddah, Saudi Arabia.

In 1984, when he was just eight, his father took him to Afghanistan to introduce him to the anticommunist struggle of the Mujahideen. After his father had moved the family to Sudan, 'Abdallah became disenchanted with the harsh life and disputed his father's banning of any refrigerator in their home. He married a cousin and moved back to Jeddah in 1995, not remaining in touch with his father after that. Osama was so displeased with him that he avoided mentioning his son's name again.

== Current activities ==
Bin Laden runs his own firm, Fame Advertising, in Jeddah. He is closely watched by the Saudi government, which restricted his travel from Saudi Arabia at least for a time from 1996. Bin Laden, who in a 2001 interview claimed the media picture of his father was distorted, is known to dine occasionally with his father's half-brother, Saudi Binladin Group chairman Bakr bin Laden, at the Intercontinental Hotel in Jeddah.

According to a document leaked in 2015 by WikiLeaks, Abdallah had requested the death certificate of his father from the United States embassy in Saudi Arabia. The embassy later told him that no death certificate was issued for Osama.

== See also ==
- Bin Laden family
- Personal life of Osama bin Laden
