= Omar bin Laden =

Son of Osama bin Laden (born 1981)

Omar bin Laden عمر بن لادن
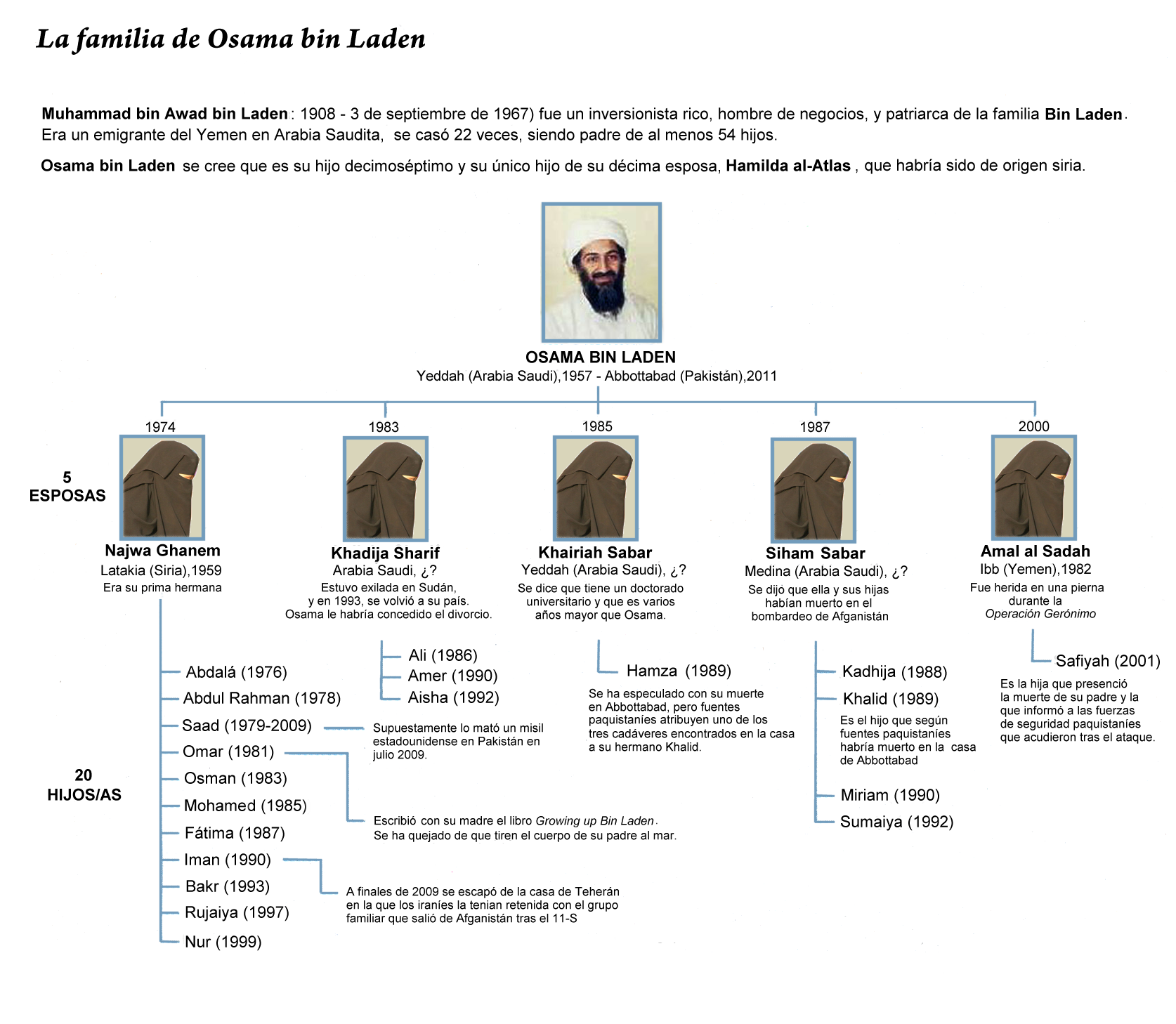
- Born: Omar bin Osama bin Mohammed bin 'Awad bin Laden; March 1, 1981 (age 45); Jeddah, Saudi Arabia
- Occupations: Artist, contractor, businessman
- Spouse: Zaina bin Laden (m. 2006)
- Parent(s): Osama bin Laden; Najwa Ghanhem
- Relatives: Abdallah bin Laden (brother); Saad bin Laden (brother); Hamza bin Laden (half-brother); Mohammed bin Awad bin Laden (grandfather); Hamida al-Attas (grandmother)

Omar bin Laden (Note: Full name: Umar bin ʾUsāmah bin Muḥammad bin ʿAwaḍ bin Lādin, Arabic: عمر بن أسامة بن محمد بن عوض بن لادن) (born March 1, 1981) is a Saudi artist, author, cultural ambassador, and businessman. He is the fourth son of Osama bin Laden and his first wife Najwa Ghanhem, who is also Osama's first cousin (see Bin Laden family).

Earlier inaccurate reports described Omar and his brother Abdallah bin Laden as nephews or cousins of Osama bin Laden.

== Childhood ==
Bin Laden was born the grandson of Mohammed bin Awad bin Laden, the founder of one of the wealthiest non-royal families in Saudi Arabia, and the son of Osama bin Laden. Omar bin Laden accompanied his father on his exile to Sudan and then to Afghanistan.

He has between 20 and 26 siblings, including 11 brothers.

He said that he trained in al-Qaeda camps beginning at the age of 14, but after training with al-Qaeda for six years and sharing a house with al-Qaeda's second-in-command Ayman al-Zawahiri, he left al-Qaeda in 2000 because he did not want to be associated with killing civilians. His father Osama did not object.

In 2010, Omar bin Laden told ABC News that Osama had severely beaten him when he was a child for smiling too widely.

== Post-9/11 ==
Bin Laden ran his own company in Jeddah prior to 2006 as a contractor and scrap metal dealer. Jeddah, a major city and important transit port for Saudi Arabia, is the site of the headquarters of the Saudi Binladen Group and has been reported to be "truly" ruled by Bakr bin Laden.

=== Marriage to Zaina Mohamed Al-Sabah ===
Omar bin Laden married Jane Felix-Browne, who also goes by the name Zaina Mohamed Al-Sabah, a parish councillor from Moulton, near Northwich in Cheshire in the United Kingdom, on September 15, 2006. The marriage was conducted in September 2006 in Islamic ceremonies in both Egypt and Saudi Arabia, after which the couple spent a few months together in Jeddah before his wife returned to Britain for several weeks.

It has been reported that Felix-Browne met bin Laden while she was undergoing treatment for multiple sclerosis. They met on a horseback ride at the Giza pyramids in Egypt. She is his second wife and 24 years older than he is, with five grandchildren. She was aware when she married bin Laden that he had been married and divorced, with a two-year-old son.

After their wedding, Al-Sabah described the stress of bin Laden's family background: "Omar is wary of everyone. He is constantly watching people who he feels might be following him. Not without reason he is fearful of cameras. He is the son of Osama. But when we are together he forgets his life." The couple announced their divorce in September 2007, which was said to be in response to threats to their "lives and liberty" from two unspecified sources known to them in Saudi Arabia. At the time, Al-Sabah said she did not regard herself as divorced and that as the divorce was done under duress did not have legal standing under Sharia law. After two weeks, they decided not to part.

In January 2008, bin Laden applied for a British spousal immigration visa which would have permitted him to reside indefinitely at his wife's home in Moulton, Cheshire, a process which required him to provide original documentation of his divorce from his first wife. The couple stated their desire to have a child using a surrogate mother. One report stated the visa application was denied because bin Laden failed to provide his father's permanent address. A later report by The Times of bin Laden's appeal stated that the visa had been denied by an entry clearance officer at the UK embassy in Cairo because bin Laden's entry would cause "considerable public concern." The officer was quoted "I note that statements made during recent media interviews indicate evidence of continuing loyalty to your father, and your presence in the UK could, therefore, cause considerable public concern." This written statement was shown to the Associated Press by the couple's legal firm, but Britain's Home Office declined to comment to the press on an individual case. In April 2008, bin Laden and Al-Sabah said they planned to appeal the ruling, calling it "unjust and arbitrary", stating that Al-Sabah requires medical attention in Britain and that her appeal to live with him in Saudi Arabia could take years to process. As of April 2008, bin Laden has a house in Cairo.

In April 2010, bin Laden was denied a visa to promote his book Osama bin Laden: A Family Portrait in France and elsewhere in Europe. Specifically, the countries of the Schengen zone, a block of 25 nations across Europe including Germany, France and Spain, rejected his request for a visa. In the same period, he was hospitalised for schizophrenia after stating that he heard his father's voice in his head.

=== North African horse race ===
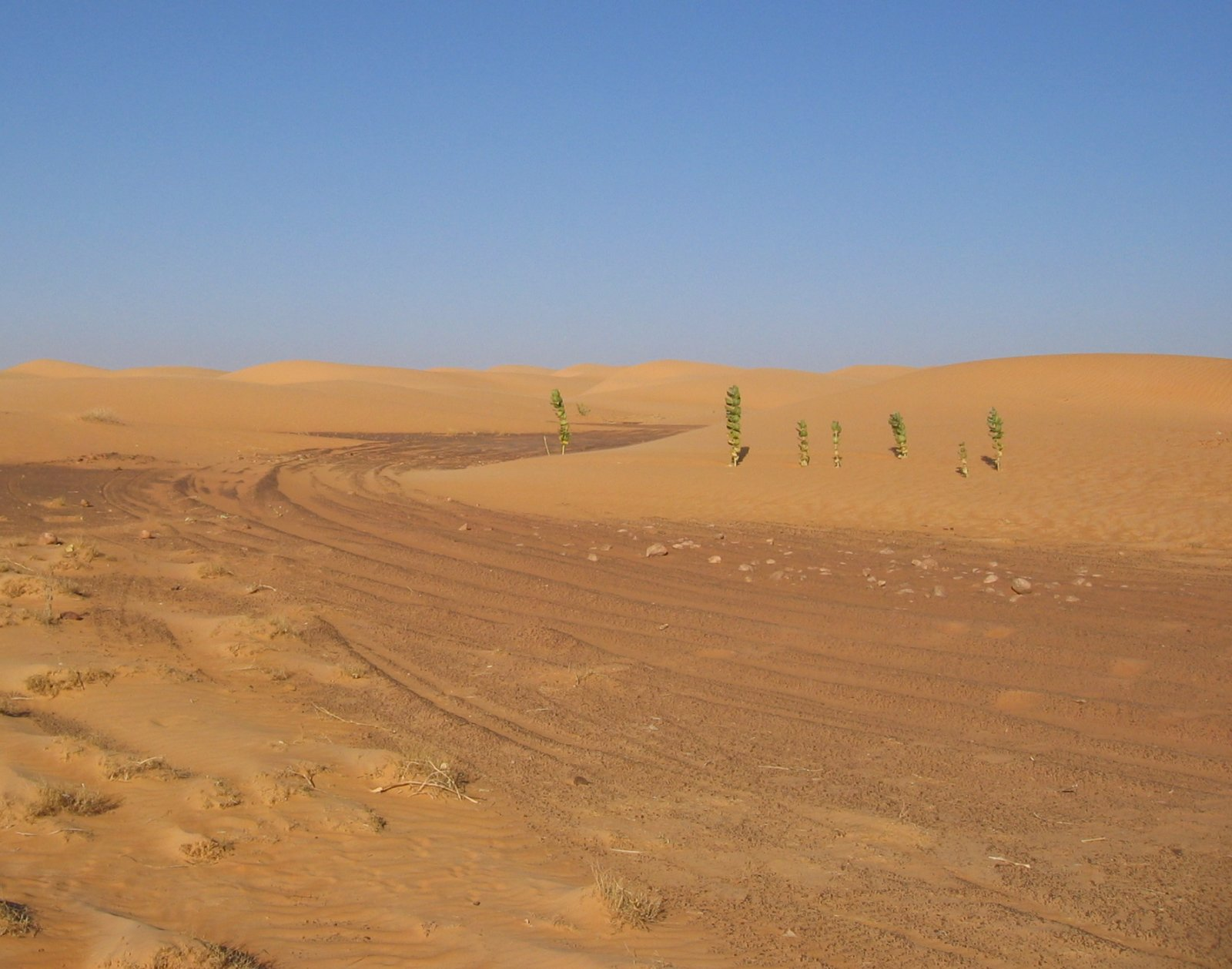
Dakar Rally track through the Mauritanian Sahara, 2005

In January 2008, an Associated Press interview in Cairo featured bin Laden with cornrows and a black leather biker jacket promoting a 4,800-kilometre (3,000 mi) horse race for peace across North Africa.

Bin Laden described the race as an equine counterpart to the canceled 2008 Paris-Dakar car rally, saying, "I heard the rally was stopped because of al-Qaeda. I don't think they are going to stop me." The race was canceled after the killings of four French tourists near Aleg, Mauritania on Christmas Eve in 2007. Following the murders, race organizers received threats directly from heavily armed and organized groups linked to al-Qaeda, which led them to cancel the race on January 4, 2008, and soon after to plan the 2009 event for South America. Police in Guinea-Bissau said that two of five men arrested for the crime on January 11, 2008, admitted their involvement with al-Qaeda.

=== Relationship to his father and al-Qaeda ===
Bin Laden said that his father felt that he was just trying to defend the Islamic world, and that his father was not a terrorist "because history tells you he's not". In an interview with ABC News, he said, "My father is a very kind man. And he is very sorry when he did something like 11th September." Osama bin Laden ordered the attacks "Because he believes if he put two buildings down, maybe some people, little will die, but millions other will (be) save(d). He believed that. ... I believe he did wrong". In a January 21, 2008, CNN interview, he said, "I try and say to my father: 'Try to find another way to help or find your goal. This bomb, these weapons, it's not good to use them on anybody.'" Regarding the September 11 attacks, he said, "I don't think 9/11 was right personally, but it happened. I don't think ... [the war] in Vietnam was right. I don't think what's going on in Palestine is right. I don't think what's going on in Iraq is right. If we make what is right and not right, we will make a very big list."

Bin Laden stated that he had not been in contact with his father since leaving Afghanistan in 2000. He said, "The last time I saw my father was in 2000, 2001. I was in Saudi Arabia and felt a terrible sorrow for all the victims [of the September 11 attacks]", "My father has a kind heart", and "I do not believe my father is dead, otherwise I would have known it; the world would have known it." When asked whether he would tell the Americans if he found out where his father was living, he said with a smile, "Actually, I would hide him. Because he is my father."

According to Time, bin Laden has stated a desire to become an "ambassador of peace" between Muslims and the West. Bin Laden said that his father offered a truce to Europe in a 2004 videotape and a conditional truce with the United States in a 2006 videotape. "My father is asking for a truce but I don't think there is any government (that) respects him. At the same time they do not respect him, why everywhere in the world, they want to fight him? There is a contradiction." The truces offered in these videos of Osama bin Laden were promptly rejected at the time.

After arriving in Rome from Switzerland amid heavy security on February 2, 2008, bin Laden said in a television interview that night "I would very much like to meet the Pope in Saint Peter's, but I have been told that it is not easy."

He is the only son of Osama bin Laden to publicly disavow his father's actions.

=== Asylum petitions ===
On November 3, 2008, Spain's Interior Ministry, upon recommendation by the United Nations High Commissioner for Refugees denied, for "insufficient evidence of danger or threat to [his] life", bin Laden's political asylum petition, after he was refused a UK visa. Bin Laden had 24 hours to appeal, after he made his claim at Madrid's Barajas International Airport upon a stopover on a flight from Cairo, Egypt to Casablanca, Morocco.

Bin Laden filed another British visa petition in 2008.

=== Growing Up bin Laden ===
Bin Laden and his mother Najwa bin Laden published a book authored in late October 2009, titled Growing Up bin Laden. According to media coverage, the book details that "the kids grew up in Saudi Arabia, Sudan, and Afghanistan without laughter or toys, were routinely beaten, and lost their pets to painful death from poison gas experiments by their father's fighters." It states that Osama bin Laden tried to persuade his son to volunteer for suicide missions and exposed him to dangerous conditions visiting training camps in Afghanistan and sending him to the front lines of the Afghan civil war. The book describes the family living in Jeddah without air conditioning or refrigeration, treating asthma with honeycombs and onions, and eventually moving to stone huts in Tora Bora without electricity or running water in 1996.

Subsequent correspondence with the Associated Press indicated that 25 bin Laden family members had moved to Iran, following U.S. involvement in Afghanistan.

=== Death of his father ===
Bin Laden published a complaint on May 10, 2011 that the burial at sea of his father deprived the family of a proper burial, and that the U.S. violated international laws by not providing a trial for his father. He made several other claims regarding the mission that killed his father, such as stating that no one living at the compound was armed. He also requested that the United Nations and other international groups investigate the killing of Osama bin Laden as a criminal matter.

=== Later life ===
Bin Laden lived in France from 2016, where he obtained a residency permit through marriage to a British citizen. He resided in Normandy until 2023, where he continued his work as an artist. In 2023, he received an administrative ban preventing him from living in France following a social media post. In 2024, French authorities revoked his residency permit, after which he relocated to Qatar.

== See also ==
- Growing Up bin Laden
- Osama Bin Laden
- Bin Laden family
- Muhammad bin Ladin
- Personal life of Osama bin Laden

== Bibliography ==
- Laden, Najwa bin; Laden, Omar bin; Sasson, Jean (2009-10-27). Growing Up bin Laden. New York: St. Martin's Press. ISBN 978-0-312-56016-4.
