= Hamida al-Attas =

Mother of Osama bin Laden

Hamida al-Attas حميدة العطاس
- Born: Alia al-Ghanem or A'alia Ghanem c. 1941; Latakia Governorate, Syria
- Spouses: Mohammed bin Awad bin Laden; Mohammed al-Attas
- Children: Osama bin Laden, Ahmad Mohammed, two other sons, and a daughter
- Relatives: Abdallah bin Laden (grandson); Saad bin Laden (grandson); Omar bin Laden (grandson); Hamza bin Laden (grandson)

Hamida al-Attas (Note: Arabic: حميدة العطاس, romanized: Ḥamīdah al-Attas) (born A'alia Ghanem; (Note: Arabic: عالية غانم), c. 1941), is the mother of Osama bin Laden, the founder and first general emir of al-Qaeda.

== Biography ==
Hamida al-Attas came from a Syrian family of citrus farmers, with two brothers and another sister, living in two small coastal villages, Omraneya and Babryon, outside the port of Latakia. She was born around 1941 (although some sources claim 1934). She grew up in a family of Alawites, an offshoot of Shia Islam. She married Mohammed bin Awad bin Laden in Latakia in 1956 when she was around 14 and moved to Saudi Arabia with her husband. She was the tenth wife of Mohammed bin Awad bin Laden. Her husband had many wives and he divorced most of them, as having only four wives at once was in accordance with Muslim law. It has been reported that she was a concubine rather than wife of Mohammed bin Awad bin Laden. She was more cosmopolitan than Mohammed's first three Saudi wives.

Osama bin Laden was her only child with Mohammad bin Laden, and they divorced soon after his birth in 1957; Osama was somewhere between the 17th and the 22nd of the 54 children which Mohammad would sire. They divorced around 1959. She often spent summers at her brother Naji's home in Latakia and Osama went with her until he was 17. In 1974, when Osama was 17, he married her brother's daughter, 14-year-old Najwa Ghanem, who had been promised to him.

Hamida later married Mohammed al-Attas, a Hadhrami administrator in the fledgling Bin Laden empire, when Osama was four or five; they had three sons and a daughter including Ahmad Mohammed. Osama took an active part in raising his half siblings.

It has been reported that, in the spring or summer of 2001, Osama bin Laden placed a phone call to his mother and in a "very brief conversation" told her "that he [will] not be able to call again for a long time," adding that "great events are about to take place." Following the September 11 attacks, Hamida has said "I disapprove of the ambitions the press ascribe to him, but I am satisfied with Osama, and I pray to God that He will guide him along the right path." She later stated "My life was very difficult because he was so far away from me. [Osama] was a very good kid and he loved me so much." She continued "He was a very good child until he met some people who pretty much brainwashed him in his early 20s. You can call it a cult. They got money for their cause. I would always tell him to stay away from them, and he would never admit to me what he was doing, because he loved me so much." The person Osama met in college was Abdullah Azzam.

== See also ==
- Bin Laden family
