= Ladin =

Ladin may refer to:

- Ladin language, a language in northern Italy, often classified as a Rhaeto-Romance language
- Ladin people, the inhabitants of the Dolomite Alps region of northern Italy

== See also ==
- Laden (disambiguation)
- Ladino (disambiguation)
- Ladins (disambiguation)
