= Soliman Biheiri =

Egyptian fundraiser for Hamas

Soliman S. Biheiri
- Born: 1952 (age 73–74); Egypt
- Other names: Soliman S. Beheiri; Soliman J. Beheiri; Soliman Behairy; Solaiman Biheiri
- Education: Economics degree from a Swiss university
- Occupation: Islamic investment firm founder/executive
- Organization: Bait ul-Mal Incorporated (BMI)
- Known for: Founding Bait ul-Mal Incorporated (BMI)
- Status: Served
- Allegiance: Hamas (alleged financial support)
- Convictions: Terrorism and fraud (pled guilty to passport fraud)
- Criminal charges: Unlawful procurement of naturalization, materially false statements, false oath in matters relating to naturalization, passport fraud.
- Penalty: 13 months and one day in prison
- Accomplice: Hussein Ibrahim (co-founder of BMI)

Soliman S. Biheiri (born 1952; also known as Soliman S. Beheiri, Soliman J. Beheiri, Soliman Behairy, Solaiman Biheiri) is an Egyptian citizen who moved to the United States in 1985. He established there Bait ul-Mal Incorporated (BMI), an Islamic investment firm that mostly fundraised on behalf of the U.S. terrorist designated Hamas. In 2005, Biheiri was sentenced to 13 months and one day in prison for terrorism and fraud.

== Life ==
Soliman Biheiri was born in Egypt in 1952. He earned an economics degree from a Swiss university and then moved to the United States in 1985, where he initially lived with his brother.

== Bait ul-Mal Inc. (BMI) ==
Biheiri founded Bait ul-Mal in 1986 in New Jersey with Hussein Ibrahim. The company provided real estate and financial services to wealthy Muslims both in the United States and abroad. Biheri's business proved extremely successful, and reported $25 million in revenues and lease by 1992.

Biheiri declared that the idea for the establishment of the company was inspired by a 1981 meeting in Luxembourg with two senior Muslim Brotherhood members, Mahmood Abu Saud and Gamal Attia, who encouraged Biheiri to exploit the favorable conditions of the U.S. market and "to start up a financial corporation in the United States in the style of other Islamic financial entities like the Islamic Development Bank, an organization initially conceptualized by Attia that has managed funds known to provide money to the families of Palestinian suicide bombers."

Steven Emerson reported that Saud invested $500,000 into a BMI subsidiary, BMI Leasing, in the mid-1980s. When he died, however, Biheiri returned the amount to Saud's widow.

== BMI's extremist and terrorist ties ==
In his congressional testimony in 2003, Richard Clarke stated that "BMI's investor list reads like a who's who of designated terrorists and Islamic extremists." According to Steven Emerson, among Bait ul-Mal Inc.'s main investors were: Mousa Abu Marzook, Hamas top officer based in the United States for several years; Yasin al-Qadi, a Specially Designated Global Terrorist sanctioned in 2001 for his alleged support to Hamas, al-Qaeda and al-Qaeda's leader Osama Bin Laden, whose assets were however unblocked in 2014; and the brothers Abdullah bin Laden, Nur bin Laden, and Eman bin Laden. Among BMI major investors were also Sana-Bell, and Kuwait Finance House.

More in general, U.S. authorities claimed in their 2003 case against Biheiri that Bait ul-Mal was founded to provide the Muslim Brotherhood with "an American-based financial vehicle."

=== Bank al-Taqwa ===
Biheiri was directly tied with Yousef Nada and Ghalb Himmat, Bank al-Taqwa's directors. Evidence collected in the late 1990s, mostly consisting of financial transactions and correspondence between Biheiri and al-Taqwa employees and directors, confirmed BMI's connection with the bank, that according to the U.S. Department of the Treasury had set up a special line of credit for al-Qaeda financial kingpin Mamdouh Mahmoud Salim to finance terrorist attacks by terrorist organizations including Hamas and al-Qaeda.

=== SAAR Network ===
The SAAR Network was a flagship corporation that represented interrelated charities, think tanks and business entities focusing on fundraising for terrorist organizations. Its offices in Virginia were raided in 2002 as the U.S. authorities investigated the network by Operation Green Quest, that uncovered evidence of SAAR's support to terrorist activities and groups.

BMI was linked to the SAAR Network through the International Relief Organization (IRO) and its financial affiliate Sana-Bell. IRO has been implicated in financial contributions to charities "suspected or convicted of financing terror," from the Horn of Africa Relief (HARA), to the Holy Land Foundation for Relief and Development (HLF), to the Islamic African Relief Agency (IARA). Emerson emphasized that Sana-Bell was established to serve as the financial arm of IRO.

Sana-Bell, a BMI business partner, sued BMI for transferring "at least $3,700,000 to BMI construction and BMI leasing, all of which was transferred to BMI Leasing without Sana-Bell's knowledge or permission." In 2000, Biheiri was held liable for about $2 million and BMI Leasing for $5,000. Emerson pointed out that the "case raised the question of whether the sudden desire to show an interest in accounting for Sana-Bell's investments in BMI was designed to distance Sana-Bell from BMI in order to avoid awkward questions that might have been asked as part of the 1998 embassy-bombing investigations." In fact, the author reported that one of BMI employees had expressed concern that "funds the accountant was transferring overseas on behalf of BMI may have been used to finance the embassy bombings in Africa."

=== Mousa Abu Marzook ===
In 1988, Biheiri and Marzook, a Specially Designated Global Terrorist since 1994, established a company in New Jersey, Mosan, with a bank account at National Community Bank of New Jersey. The company was involved in building a housing development in Prince George's County, in Maryland, that U.S. authorities later labelled "Hamas Heights." Biheiri managed Marzook's money after he was deported in 1995. Emerson stressed that that money remains unaccounted for. Marzook himself brought in more than $1 million for BMI.

=== Biheiri's legal issues and trials ===
Biheiri was condemned on three counts (unlawful procurement of naturalization, materially false statements, false oath in matters relating to naturalization) and pleaded guilty in October 2004 to one count of passport fraud.

On January 13, 2005, Biheiri was sentenced to thirteen months and one day in prison for terrorism and fraud. He denied having financial links to terrorist or terrorist businesses, although legal proceedings and documents collected by U.S. authorities confirmed that he had been administering and investing money for and on behalf of Marzook since the early 1980s.
