= Carmen bin Laden =

Swiss author

Carmen bin Ladin
- Born: Carmen Dufour; 1953 (age 72–73); Lausanne, Switzerland
- Occupation: Author
- Spouse: Yeslam bin Ladin (divorced)
- Children: 3

Carmen bin Ladin (née Dufour; born 1953) is a Swiss author. She was a member of the bin Ladin family, having entered the family by marriage to Yeslam bin Ladin, a son of the patriarch Muhammad bin Ladin; they have since divorced.

== Biography ==
=== Early life ===
Carmen Dufour was born in 1953 in Lausanne, Switzerland. Her father was Swiss, and her mother, Mehrdokht Sheybani, was Iranian. She was raised in Lausanne by her mother along with three other sisters, Salomé, Béatrice, and Magnolia.

=== Adult life ===
From 1974 to 1988, she was married to Yeslam bin Ladin, an older half-brother of Osama bin Ladin. They were married in 1974 in Jeddah, Saudi Arabia. They had three daughters, Wafah Dufour, Najia and Noor.

In 2004, she published Inside the Kingdom: My Life in Saudi Arabia, a personal account of her life as a Saudi Arabian wife and mother. The book contains insights into life in the bin Ladin family and her relationship with them and her former husband. She claims that no matter how westernized her ex-husband or other bin Ladin family members may be, they still feel strong familial and religious ties, and would have financially supported and sheltered Osama bin Ladin if necessary, prior to his May 2011 death. She admits that while she found it difficult to adjust to the restrictive Saudi Arabian society, her lifestyle was one of privilege.

She later moved to Geneva with her then husband and three children, and finally left her husband in 1988, asking for a divorce in 1994. She alleges that her ex-husband engaged in emotional blackmail including threatening to kidnap her children, adultery, and forced her to undergo an abortion. She finally obtained a divorce 12 years later in January 2006. Yeslam bin Ladin is reportedly uninvolved and uninterested in the lives of his former wife and daughters. He is quoted in Carmen Dufour's book as saying that he wished he had sons and not daughters. Yeslam has obtained a Swiss passport supposedly for the purpose of pursuing a relationship with his children.

In her book, she writes that she had only seen Osama bin Ladin on two occasions and that they did not really speak. She emphasizes that the bin Ladin family is a large one, and not all family members are directly associated with Osama bin Ladin.

== See also ==
- Bin Ladin family
