= Ghost war =

Ghost war may refer to:

- Ghost Wars, 2004 book by Steve Coll
- Ghost Wars (TV series), 2017 television series
- Jack Ryan: Ghost War, 2026 American film

== See also ==
- Ghosts of War
