= Rashad Mohammed Saeed Ismael =

Yemeni al Qaeda associate (born 1974)

- Born: 1974 (age 51–52); Ibb, Yemen
- Other name: Abu al-Fida
- Known for: Alleged to be a close associate of Osama bin Laden

Rashad Mohammed Saeed Ismael, also known as Abu Al-Fida, is a citizen of Yemen alleged to be a close associate of al Qaeda leader Osama bin Laden. According to The Times he worked with bin Laden during the Soviet occupation of Afghanistan.

bin Laden commissioned him to return to Yemen, and seek out a girl to serve as his fifth wife. His choice, Amal Ahmed al-Sadah married bin Laden in 2000 in Kandahar.

The Times reports Ismael was apprehended in Yemen, shortly after al Qaeda's attacks on September 11, 2001. They report he was held for two years in Yemen. They report that his brother Sadeq, a brother-in-law and a cousin were all held in Guantanamo.
