= Jama'at Ansar al-Furqan in Bilad al Sham =

Syrian jihadist group

Jama'at Ansar al-Furqan fi Bilad al-Sham
- جماعة أنصار الفرقان في بلاد الشام
- Logo used by the group
- Leaders: Hamza bin Laden † (allegedly); Abu Julaybib †
- Dates active: 9 October 2017–November 2017
- Groups: Former Jaish al-Muhajireen wal-Ansar, Jabhat al-Nusra, and ISIL elements
- Ideology: Islamism: Caliphate Restoration; Anti-communism
- Wars: the Syrian Civil War

Jama'at Ansar al-Furqan fi Bilad al-Sham (Arabic: جماعة أنصار الفرقان في بلاد الشام; lit. "Supporters of the Criterion in the Levant") was an armed jihadist group that was active in Syria which was established in the fall of 2017 by former members of Jaish al-Muhajireen wal-Ansar. The group was reportedly led by the son of al-Qaeda's founder Osama bin Laden, Hamza bin Laden.

== Background ==
In the group's charter it claimed to be at war with the government of Bashar al-Assad, Turkey, the Turkish-backed Free Syrian Army, Russia, Shias and atheists. The charter also outlined the group's opposition to both democratic and communist governments and opposition to the various current Arab governments, most of whom are secular. The group had called upon various jihadist factions to unite and focus on fighting common enemies and had recruited many veteran jihadist fighters from such groups in Syria. The group also reportedly had a large number of veteran al-Qaeda fighters from the Arabian Peninsula and South Asia.

After the group's formation, Hayat Tahrir al-Sham (HTS) arrested the group's leadership in November 2017, as well as Sami al-Oraydi, who left HTS and was formerly al-Nusra's top Sharia official. After the arrests, Ansar al-Furqan and HTS agreed not to weaken or compete with each other, until the later establishment of Hurras al-Din led by several HTS defectors and al-Qaeda loyalists including al-Oraydi.

== See also ==
- White Flags
