= Yeslam bin Ladin =

Saudi businessman

Yeslam bin Ladin يسلم بن لادن
- Born: Yeslam bin Muhammad bin Awad bin Ladin; October 19, 1950 (age 76)
- Education: University of Gothenburg; University of Southern California
- Occupation: Businessman
- Parents: Mohammed bin Laden (father); Rabab Haguigui (mother)

Yeslam bin Muhammad bin Awad bin Ladin (Arabic: يسلم بن محمد بن عوض بن لادن; born October 19, 1950) better known as Yeslam bin Ladin, also written Yeslam Binladin, as he prefers to spell it, is a businessman and the half-brother of the deceased al-Qaeda leader, Osama bin Laden.

== Family background and career ==
Yeslam bin Ladin is a Saudi national of Persian and Yemeni heritage (through his mother and father, respectively). He has 54 half-brothers and half-sisters, including 2 younger brothers (Ibrahim and Khalil), and a younger sister (Fawziyya), by the same mother as him, Rabab Haguigui. They used to live in Jeddah, Saudi Arabia. His father, Mohammed bin Laden, died when he was 17 years old.

After attending high school in Beirut, Lebanon, bin Ladin studied economics at University of Gothenburg, Sweden, and business administration at USC. On February 25, 2005, he was granted permission by the Swiss government to use the name bin Ladin to brand products for his business including a perfume for men and women dubbed "Yeslam," and a second one for women "Passion," and other goods such as handbags, accessories, and watches under the name "Yeslam." Shops opened in Geneva (1), in Jeddah (2), in Riyadh (1), in Mecca, in Dammam (1) (Saudi Arabia) and in Kuala Lumpur (Malaysia). He hires creators and chooses the creations, but he is not himself a designer. He has a pilot's license, like his father, and owns a Learjet.

Since 1980, Yeslam has been chairman of the Geneva, Switzerland-based Saudi Investment Company (SICO), which represents his family's Saudi Binladin Group's international financial interests. His fortune was estimated to have peaked at 300 million Swiss Francs, but is now thought to be below 100 million.

== Personal life ==
He has lived in Switzerland since the mid-1980s, and became a Swiss citizen in April 2001. He speaks Arabic, English, French, and Persian. As of 2020, he speaks Turkish. He is a Sunni Muslim and is said to live a mainly Western lifestyle. An ex-girlfriend of his from 1993 to 2001, Catherine Berclaz, is a Swiss interior decorator who wrote a book on their relationship, Yeslam, My Love: In the Heart of the Bin Laden Family.

He divorced his wife, Carmen bin Ladin, in January 2006, after 15 years of separation. Carmen bin Ladin wrote an autobiography, Inside the Kingdom (ISBN 0-446-69488-6), which was a New York Times Bestseller, recounting her life in the bin Ladin family and how she managed to keep her daughters in her custody. He has three daughters, Wafah Dufour, Najia, and Noor, and has reportedly not spoken to them for more than 15 years because of their western customs. Wafah (Dufour) bin Ladin earned a law degree from Geneva University, and a master's degree from Columbia Law School in New York. In 2006, she appeared in a men's magazine, GQ. She has lived in New York and now resides in London.

He has been a partner of Pakistani businessman Akberali Moawalla.
