= Jean Sasson =

American author

Jean P. Sasson
- Born: Troy, Alabama, United States
- Occupation: Author
- Writing career
- Period: 1991–present
- Genre: Non-fiction
- Notable work: Princess: A True Story of Life Behind the Veil in Saudi Arabia
- Website: www.jeansasson.com

Jean P. Sasson is an American writer whose work mainly centers around women in the Middle East.

== Biography ==
Growing up in a small town, Sasson found adventure between the pages of books. Her strong desire to uproot herself from her rural surroundings led her to jump at the opportunity to work and travel abroad. In 1978 she traveled to Saudi Arabia to work in the King Faisal Specialist Hospital in Riyadh as an administrative coordinator of medical affairs., where she met Peter Sasson, her future husband. They married in 1982 and Sasson left the hospital after four years of service, but the couple remained in Saudi Arabia until 1990.

Sasson is currently based in Atlanta, Georgia.

== Works ==
- The Rape of Kuwait ISBN 978-1561291939 – Knightsbridge (January 1991)
- Ester's Child ISBN 0967673739 – Windsor-Brooke (September 1, 2001)
- Mayada: Daughter of Iraq ISBN 978-0525948117 – Dutton Adult (October 16, 2003)
- Love in a Torn Land: Joanna of Kurdistan: The True Story of a Freedom Fighter's Escape from Iraqi Vengeance ISBN 978-0470067291 – Wiley (March 5, 2007)
- Growing Up bin Laden: Osama's Wife and Son Take Us Inside Their Secret World St. Martin's Press, (2009)
- For the Love of a Son: One Afghan Woman's Quest for Her Stolen Child ISBN 0553820206 Bantam (February 1, 2011)
- Yasmeena's Choice: A True Story of War, Rape, Courage and Survival ISBN 1939481147 – LDA (October 3, 2013)

=== Princess Sultana ===
- Princess: A True Story of Life Behind the Veil in Saudi Arabia ISBN 978-0967673745 – Windsor-Brooke (March 1, 2001)
- Princess Sultana's Daughters ISBN 978-0967673752 – Windsor-Brooke (March 1, 2001) (UK Title: Daughters of Arabia (ISBN 978-0553816938, Bantam, 2004)
- Princess Sultana's Circle ISBN 978-0967673769 – Windsor-Brooke (May 1, 2002) (UK title: Desert Royal (ISBN 978-0553816945, Bantam, 2004)
- Princess, More Tears to Cry ISBN 0857522426 – Transworld Doubleday UK (August 28, 2014)
- Princess, Secrets to Share ISBN 9781939481399 – Penguin Books (November 30, 2015)
- Princess, Stepping out of the Shadows ISBN 9780593080504 – Random House (August 1, 2019)

== Reception ==
Though the Princess Sultana series is presented as an account of a real Saudi princess, external commentators have argued that the princess does not really exist. Former United States ambassador to Saudi Arabia James Akins and writer Jack Shaheen pointed out what they described as factual inaccuracies and implausibilities in the books. Akins stated that Saudis have not attempted to discern the identity of the princess because they consider the stories to be fictional.

=== Awards and honors ===
- Princess was selected as one of the best "500 Great Books by Women"
- The New York Times Best Seller list
- The Sunday Times Best Seller List
- Princess – chosen as an Alternate Selection of the Literary Guild Doubleday Book Club
- Princess – chosen as A Reader's Digest Selection
- Princess was a Bestseller in over 25 countries around the world

== Other works ==
- American Chick in Saudi Arabia (Kindle Edition only, not a full book)
