= Tarek bin Laden =

Saudi businessman; half-brother of Osama bin Laden

Tarek bin Laden طارق بن لادن
- Born: Tarek bin Mohammed bin 'Awad bin Laden; 1947 (age 78–79)
- Occupation: Businessman
- Known for: Half-brother of Osama bin Laden
- Father: Mohammed bin Awad bin Laden

Tarek bin Mohammed bin 'Awad bin Laden (Note: Sometimes spelled Tarik bin Laden, bin Ladin, or Binladin) (Arabic: طارق بن محمد بن عوض بن لادن; born 1947) is the half-brother of Osama bin Laden, and a member of the Saudi Arabia business community. He was once called "the personification of the dichotomy (conservatism and change) of Saudi Arabia." He started a textile business with Swedish actor Kjell Bergqvist, intending to make use of some of the large state-owned textile mills in Egypt, and then sell the clothing in the West. "It didn't work out. The factories in Egypt produced for the Soviet Union and they were poorly designed," Bergqvist recalled.

== See also ==
- Bin Laden family
- Bridge of the Horns
