= Robat, Afghanistan =

Robat
- village
- Location in Afghanistan
- Coordinates: 34°53′57″N 64°21′23″E
- Country: Afghanistan
- Province: Badghis Province
- Time zone: + 4.30

Robat is a village in Badghis Province in north western Afghanistan.
