= Ladins (disambiguation) =

Ladins can refer to:

- Ladin people, an ethnic group in northern Italy
- speakers of the Ladin language
- Ladins Political Movement, a political party in South Tyrol
