= Salem bin Laden =

Saudi billionaire businessman (1946–1988)

Salem bin Laden سالم بن لادن
- Born: 4 January 1946; Jeddah, Saudi Arabia
- Died: 29 May 1988 (aged 42); Schertz, Texas, United States
- Cause of death: Plane crash
- Occupation: Chairman of Saudi Binladin Group
- Spouse: Caroline Carey
- Children: 3
- Father: Muhammed bin Laden
- Relatives: Osama Bin Laden (brother)

Salem bin Laden (Arabic: سالم بن لادن) (4 January 1946 – 29 May 1988) was a Saudi Arabian investor and billionaire businessman.

== Life ==
Salem was the eldest son of Muhammad bin Laden, the founder of the Saudi Binladin Group, and a half-brother of the militant jihadist Osama bin Laden. Bin Laden was educated at Millfield and acted as the patriarch of the bin Laden family after the 1967 death of his father. Salem managed the family's extensive investment portfolio and was in charge of the family income distribution. He also oversaw the individual education plans for each of his (half-) brothers and (half-) sisters. Just like his father, he highly valued the close relationship of the bin Ladens with the Saudi royal family. He provided means and support to the family during the Mecca uprising of 1979.

George W. Bush knew James Bath, a Texan businessman who served as the North American representative for rich Saudis among Bin Laden relatives, and using Bath connections he met billionaire Salem bin Laden, banker and BCCI Khalid bin Mahfouz. The two Saudis were willing to invest in the oil business. Salem bin Laden was one of the investors in the Arbusto oil company, created by George W. Bush in 1979.

Salem owned a house in Orlando, Florida, and often used it for vacation stays.

== Death ==
Salem bin Laden died on 29 May 1988, in a plane crash in an ultralight aircraft that he was piloting near Schertz, Texas. During the flight, he accidentally collided with high-voltage electrical power lines adjacent to the Kitty Hawk airfield and the Sprint ultralight aircraft fell 115 feet (35 m) to the ground. Salem, who was not wearing a safety helmet, died of head injuries from the resulting fall. The National Transportation Safety Board did not investigate the incident because ultralight aircraft, like the one Salem was flying, fell outside their jurisdiction per FAR Part 103 Provisions, exempting such aircraft from their mandate. The Schertz Police, who attended to the incident, stated in their report that Salem died in a "freak accident".

Following his death, Salem's body was transported back to Saudi Arabia and accorded the honor of a burial in Medina, one of the most sacred cities in the Islamic world. A significant memorial event was held at the bin Laden family compound in Jeddah, spanning two days. All of the twenty-two bin Laden sons formed a line to receive the thousands of guests attending the funeral. Salem, who had secured a billion-dollar contract in the early 1980s for the innovation of the Prophet's Mosque, had effectively managed his father's business and had been instrumental to the family's ongoing success and prosperity. The memorial served as a testament to Salem's contributions and the deep respect held for him within the family and the community.

This was the second plane crash death in the bin Laden family, as Salem's father, Muhammad bin Ladin, also died in a plane crash in 1967. A third plane crash claimed more members of the bin Laden family on 31 July 2015 when a business jet carrying Osama bin Laden's half-sister, Sana, and his stepmother, Rajaa Hashim, crashed at Blackbushe airport in Hampshire, England.
