= Growing Up bin Laden =

English-language non-fiction book by Omar bin Laden, Najwa bin Laden and Jean Sasson

Growing Up bin Laden: Osama's Wife and Son Take Us Inside Their Secret World
- Author: Najwa bin Laden; Omar bin Laden; Jean Sasson
- Language: English
- Subject: Family of Osama bin Laden
- Publisher: St. Martin's Press
- Publication date: 27 October 2009
- Media type: Print
- Pages: 352
- ISBN: 0-312-56016-8

Growing Up bin Laden: Osama's Wife and Son Take Us Inside Their Secret World is a 2009 book written by Osama bin Laden's first wife Najwa bin Laden and fourth son Omar Bin Laden.

== Reviews ==
The Denver Post did a review and summary of the book, stating: "It is not necessary to read this book to understand the al-Qaeda threat, but for those seeking deeper knowledge of Osama bin Laden and how his mind works, the book is a valuable supplement to the existing libraries."
