= The Bin Ladens: An Arabian Family in the American Century =

Book by Steve Coll

- Author: Steve Coll
- Language: English
- Publisher: Penguin Press
- Publication date: 2008
- Publication place: United States
- Media type: Print
- Pages: 671
- ISBN: 978-1594201646
- OCLC: 175218166

The Bin Ladens: An Arabian Family in the American Century is a New York Times best-selling book written by two-time Pulitzer Prize-winning author Steve Coll in 2008. The book illustrates the story of the Bin Laden family's rise to power and privilege, with Coll's journalistic investigation revealing how American influences affected the family and how one member, Osama bin Laden, led a rebellion that changed the United States of America.

== Recognition ==
- CODES Notable Books Council Award Winner
- Pulitzer Prize for Biography or Autobiography Finalist
- National Book Critics Circle Award Finalist
- Los Angeles Times Book Prize Finalist.
- PEN/John Kenneth Galbraith Award
