= Hamza bin Laden =

Member of al-Qaeda (1989–2019)

- حمزة بن لادن
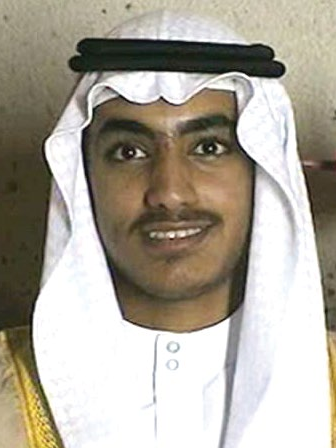
- Bin Laden in 2005
- Born: Hamza bin Osama bin Mohammed bin Awad bin Laden; 9 May 1989; Jeddah, Saudi Arabia
- Died: c. 2019 (allegedly); Afghanistan–Pakistan border
- Spouse: Maryam bint Abdullah
- Children: Osama
- Parents: Osama bin Laden (father); Khairiah Sabir (mother)
- Military career
- Allegiance: Al-Qaeda (Jama'at Ansar al-Furqan in Bilad al Sham)
- Service years: 2011–2019
- Conflicts: War on terror; War in Afghanistan; War in North-West Pakistan; Syrian Civil War

Hamza bin Laden (Note: Full name: Ḥamzat bin Usāma bin Muḥammad bin ʿAwaḍ bin Lādin, Arabic: حمزة بن أسامة بن محمد بن عوض بن لادن) (9 May 1989 – c. 2019) was a Saudi-born key member of al-Qaeda. He was a son of Osama bin Laden. On 14 September 2019, U.S. president Donald Trump announced that he was killed in a U.S. counterterrorism operation on the Afghanistan–Pakistan border. In 2024, unconfirmed media reports claimed that he was still alive and a senior leader of al-Qaeda.

== Early life and family ==
Hamza bin Osama bin Mohammed bin Awad bin Laden was born on 9 May 1989, in Jeddah, Saudi Arabia.

In January 2001, Hamza, his father and other family members attended the wedding of his brother Mohammed bin Laden in the southern Afghan city of Kandahar. Video footage shot in the Ghazni province in November of the same year shows Hamza bin Laden at age 12 and some of his siblings handling U.S. helicopter wreckage and working alongside the Taliban.

In March 2003, it was claimed that Hamza bin Laden and his brother Saad bin Laden had been wounded and captured in Robat, Afghanistan. This claim eventually proved false. Actually, Hamza bin Laden, other bin Laden family members, and certain al-Qaeda leaders escaped to Iran, where they were held in detention after the 9/11 attacks.

Bin Laden married a daughter of Abdullah Ahmed Abdullah when he was 17 years old.

In August 2018, The Guardian quoted bin Laden's uncles as saying he had married a daughter of 9/11 hijacker Mohamed Atta. However, Hamza's brother Omar bin Laden denied the report. Also, Mohamed Atta never married or had any children.

== Relation to Al-Qaeda ==
In a 2005 video titled The Mujahideen of Waziristan, Hamza bin Laden is shown participating in an al-Qaeda assault on Pakistani security forces in the south Waziristan tribal region between Afghanistan and Pakistan. In September 2007, it was reported that he was again in the tribal belt which encompasses the Pakistan/Afghanistan border region taking a senior role with al-Qaeda forces. However, all of these reports have later been proven false, as Hamza was actually trapped in Iran from March 2002 at the age of 12 until July or August 2010 at the age of 21, when he was finally released into Pakistan. During most of this time, from December 2002 until his release, he was kept under prison-like conditions.

In July 2008, a translation of a poem said to be written by bin Laden was made available, which had been published on an Islamic extremist website. In the poem bin Laden wrote "Accelerate the destruction of America, Britain, France and Denmark." In response, British MP Patrick Mercer dubbed Hamza bin Laden the "Crown Prince of Terror."

Bin Laden was falsely implicated in the 2007 assassination of former Pakistani Prime Minister Benazir Bhutto. However, according to an interrogation of former al-Qaeda spokesman Sulaiman Abu Ghaith, bin Laden was under house arrest in Iran when Bhutto was assassinated and was not released until 2010, when he and other bin Laden family members were freed in exchange for an Iranian diplomat held in Pakistan.

After his release from Iran, Hamza stayed in the Khyber Pakhtunkhwa State in Pakistan but was not allowed to proceed to his father in Abbottabad. After his father's death on 2 May 2011, Hamza was brought to Qatar, where he remained for several years, studying Islamic religious texts, as his father had recommended. But the lure of following in his father's footsteps caused him to move back to Pakistan about 2015 to continue the struggle.

On 14 August 2015, bin Laden released an audio message for the very first time. He called upon followers in Kabul, Baghdad and Gaza to wage jihad, or holy war, on Washington, D.C., London, Paris and Tel Aviv.

It was reported on 11 May 2016 that bin Laden released an audio message focused on the issues of Palestine and the Syrian Civil War. He said the "blessed Syrian revolution" had made the prospect of "liberating" Jerusalem more likely. "The Islamic umma should focus on jihad in al-Sham … and unite the ranks of mujahedin," he said. "There is no longer an excuse for those who insist on division and disputes now that the whole world has mobilised against Muslims."

In July 2016, media reported that bin Laden had issued an audio message threatening the United States in revenge for his father's death. In the 21-minute speech entitled "We Are All Osama," he said "We will continue striking you and targeting you in your country and abroad in response to your oppression of the people of Palestine, Afghanistan, Syria, Iraq, Yemen, Somalia and the rest of the Muslim lands that did not survive your oppression." He continued, "As for the revenge by the Islamic nation for Sheikh Osama, may Allah have mercy on him, it is not revenge for Osama the person but it is revenge for those who defended Islam." On 13 May 2017, a ten-minute video recording by Hamza bin Laden was published by As-Sahab, encouraging terrorist attacks against Western targets. Specifically, in this video Hamza called on the al Qaeda followers to carry out lone wolf attacks against Jews, Americans, Westerners and Russians with whatever means are available to them. This is the last time that any material emerged showing that Hamza bin Laden was alive. It appears that the total of Hamza's activities as an adult on behalf of al-Qaeda consists only of his releasing his three audios and one video between 2015 and 2017. There is no evidence of his actually plotting any attacks, much less carrying any out, which shows how degraded al Qaeda's capabilities had become by this time.

It was rumored that bin Laden pledged allegiance to Jama'at Ansar al-Furqan in Bilad al Sham in 2017. In light of his supposed growing influence within al-Qaeda, the United States classified Hamza bin Laden as a Specially Designated Global Terrorist in January 2017. This designation effectively put him on a blacklist which was aimed at restricting his movement and economic abilities.

On 28 February 2019, the United States Department of State offered a reward of up to US$1 million for information leading to the identification or location in any country of bin Laden.

The Kingdom of Saudi Arabia announced on 1 March 2019 that it had revoked bin Laden's citizenship through a royal decree signed in November 2018.

== Death of his father ==
Hamza bin Laden was the son of Khairiah Sabir, one of Osama bin Laden's three wives who were living in the Abbottabad compound.

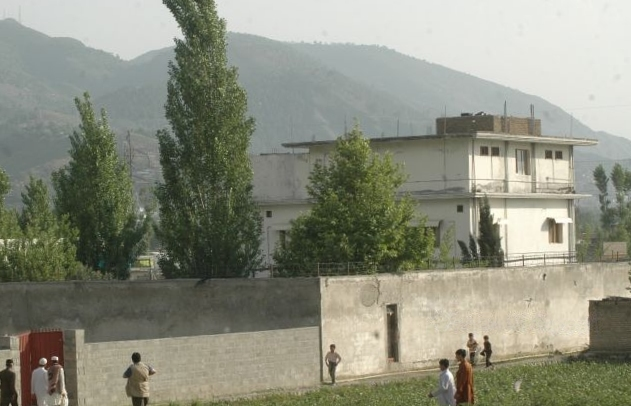
Osama bin Laden's last home, in Abbottabad

Interrogation of the surviving wives of Osama bin Laden by Pakistani intelligence after the raid on the Abbottabad compound revealed Hamza was the only person missing among those thought to be there. He was not among those killed or injured. The raid conducted by the SEAL team was thorough: infrared technology, as well as ground troops, remained confident nobody inside the compound had escaped. There were no hidden exit tunnels from the compound.

In a letter confiscated in the raid, written by Osama bin Laden and addressed to his "Chief of Staff" Atiyah Abd al-Rahman, bin Laden mentions his desire for his son Hamza to be educated in Qatar as a religious scholar so that he could "refute the wrong and the suspicions raised around Jihad." The same letter confirmed that Hamza was not present in Abbottabad at the time of the raid. Letters from the compound also were alleged to show that Osama was apparently grooming his son to be his heir, following the death of Hamza's older brother Saad bin Laden in a 2009 US drone strike. Nelly Lahoud argues that the letters show that neither Osama bin Laden, nor his lieutenant Atiyah, nor even Hamza's mother Khairiah thought that Hamza was suitable for leadership nor for fighting, and they felt that he had been psychologically harmed by his long imprisonment in his adolescence in Iran. Being disappointed in his sons, by the time of his death Osama bin Laden was relying rather on his wives Khairiah and Siham and his daughters Maryam and Sumayyah.

== Claims of death ==
On 31 July 2019, The New York Times and other news organizations quoted unnamed American officials as saying bin Laden was killed in the first two years of the Trump Administration, which began on 20 January 2017. At the time, intelligence agencies were unable to confirm his death and, in February 2019, the U.S. State Department issued a $1 million reward for information leading to bin Laden's whereabouts. On 14 September 2019, U.S. President Donald Trump confirmed that bin Laden had been killed in a U.S. counterterrorism operation in the Afghanistan/Pakistan region. Other details were not disclosed.

Afghan journalist Bilal Sarwary stated that bin Laden was most likely killed in the Geru district in the Ghazni province of Afghanistan.

Maryam, Hamza bin Laden's widow and the daughter of the Egyptian high-ranking member of al-Qaeda Abdullah Ahmed Abdullah (nom de guerre Abu Muhammed al-Masri), was killed in August 2020 in Tehran, Iran alongside her father. This has been denied by Iran.

In September 2024, the National Mobilization Front (NMF), a resistance group fighting against the Afghan Taliban, claimed that bin Laden was still alive. He allegedly moved to the Dara Abdullah Khel district in Panjshir, where he leads al-Qaeda in Afghanistan along with his brother Abdullah, preparing attacks.

On 10 September 2026, As-Sahab released a video which featured Hamza bin Laden but did not indicate whether he is dead or alive.

== See also ==
- Bin Laden family
- Personal life of Osama bin Laden
