= Anthony Laden =

American philosopher

Anthony Simon Laden

Education
- Education: Harvard University (BA, PhD)

Philosophical work
- Era: 21st-century philosophy
- Region: Western philosophy
- Institutions: University of Illinois at Chicago
- Main interests: ethics, political philosophy

Anthony Simon Laden is an American philosopher and Professor of Philosophy at the University of Illinois at Chicago. Laden is known for his works on ethics and political philosophy.

== Books ==
- Reasoning: A Social Picture (Oxford University Press, 2012)
- Reasonably Radical: Deliberative Liberalism and the Politics of Identity (Cornell, 2001)
- Multiculturalism and Political Theory, edited with David Owen (Cambridge, 2007)
