= Pete Brewton =

American journalist

Pete Brewton teaches journalism and law at Texas Tech University in Lubbock, Texas. Brewton is best known for an investigative journalism series he wrote for the Houston Post that were the basis of a book, The Mafia, CIA and George Bush. He is a journalist with 15 years reporting experience at the Houston Chronicle and the Houston Post. He practiced law in Houston for five years.

Pete Brewton holds a bachelor's degree in philosophy from Rice University, a master's degree in astronomy from New Mexico State University, a master's degree from the American Graduate School of International Management, and a law degree from the University of Texas. He travels frequently to help with his mother's working cattle ranch in Lampasas County. He is author of a 2006 novel, Lone Star Law.

In 1986 he co-won 2 Matrix Awards for his story on "Hermann Hospital Estate" with Mary Flood, and for his story with John Mecklin on County Commissioner Bob Eckels, both in the investigative/interpretive category.

== The Mafia, CIA and George Bush ==
He is the author of the book The Mafia, CIA and George Bush, which is based on his investigations of powerful Texas businessmen, politicians, and their connections to the savings and loans scandals of the 1980s. The book grew out of an 8-part investigative reporting series that ran in the Houston Post, a series that the Seattle Times columnist John Hinterberger described as "a bombshell series backed up by eight months of investigation." The series won the Galvaston Press Club award for best investigative series. In 1991 PEN awarded the Journalism prize to Brewton, "Awarded for his series on the Savings & Loan scandal," in the Houston Post.

Andrew Ferguson of the Weekly Standard characterized Brewton's book as one of a series of anti-Bush books "written in Texas by veteran Texas activists who have grown bitter from the endless frustration and resentment that is their unhappy lot." Andrew Ferguson was a speech writer for George H. W. Bush in 1992. Brewton promoted the book on Alternative Views.

Texas politician Jon Lindsay took out a newspaper advertisement to discredit Brewton's book.
