= Najwa Ghanem =

Relative of Osama bin Laden (born 1958)

Najwa Ghanem نجوى غانم
- Born: 1958 (age 67–68); Latakia, United Arab Republic (present-day Syria)
- Spouse: Osama Bin Laden (m. 1974; died 2011)
- Children: 11, including Abdallah, Saad, Omar

Najwa Ghanem (Arabic: نجوى غانم; born 1958) is a Syrian woman who was the first wife and first cousin of Osama bin Laden, being the daughter of his mother's brother. She is also known as Umm Abdallah (mother of Abdallah).

== Biography ==
Najwa was born to Ibrahim and Nabeeha in Latakia, United Arab Republic (present-day Syria). She had five siblings. Osama married Najwa in Latakia in 1974 when she was 15. She travelled with him to Sudan and Afghanistan.

According to Abu Jandal, she left Afghanistan before the September 11 attacks and did not return. According to Najwa and her son Omar bin Laden, desiring to return to a normal life, she left Afghanistan sometime between September 7 and 9, 2001. In 2005, Huthaifa Azzam, son of Abdullah Azzam, stated that she was living in Damascus with her son Abdel Rahman. From about April 2012, she moved to Qatar, where seven of her surviving children also continued to reside.

== Family ==
She is the mother of 11 children, including Saad. She co-authored Growing Up bin Laden with Omar. Her daughter Iman who was released by Iran in 2010 went to live with her in Syria. According to a close family member in 2011, Najwa's mother died of shock and grief after hearing of her son-in-law's death.

== See also ==
- Bin Laden family
- Personal life of Osama bin Laden
