= Saudi Investment Company =

The Saudi Investment Company (SICO), headquartered Geneva, Switzerland, and founded on May 19, 1980, represents the worldwide interests of the Saudi Binladin Group.

== Overview ==
Saudi Investment Company (SICO SA) Saudi Investment Company SICO SA is a Swiss private investment company (Société Anonyme) headquartered in Geneva, Switzerland. It was incorporated on 19 May 1980 and is registered with the Commercial Register of the Canton of Geneva under number CH-660.0.214.980-1. The company operates as a multi-sector private investment house, deploying long-term institutional capital across a range of verticals including financial technology, healthcare technology, e-mobility, agrifood technology, energy transition, Web3 and blockchain, art and alternative assets, real estate, and selected deep technology opportunities. It invests across Europe, the Middle East, Asia and the Americas through direct equity, convertible instruments, and structured financial arrangements. SICO SA is currently chaired by Mr Charles Rochat and managed by an experienced team of investment professionals based in Geneva. The company maintains its registered office at Rue François-Le-Fort 2, 1206 Geneva, Switzerland. History Saudi Investment Company SICO SA was founded in Geneva in 1980. During its early decades, the company served as a vehicle for international financial activities and investments with connections to Gulf private wealth. The company has since undergone significant governance changes and today operates as a fully independent Swiss Société Anonyme under its current board and management, with no operational connection to its founding shareholders. Following investigations by Swiss and French authorities in the aftermath of the September 2001 attacks, no charges were brought against the company or its current leadership in connection with any unlawful activity. The company has continued to operate in full compliance with Swiss corporate and financial law. Current operations Under its current governance, SICO SA focuses on private investment and advisory mandates across multiple sectors and geographies. The company works in close collaboration with institutional partners and family offices across Europe, the Middle East, and Asia, and maintains active commercial partnerships with a number of leading global organisations in the technology, energy, and industrial sectors.

== Personnel ==
The company is currently chaired by Mr Charles Rochat, a Geneva-based business executive who has been associated with SICO SA since its early years of operation. The board of directors is composed of investment and legal professionals based in Switzerland.

== Historical note ==
From the company's founding in 1980 until the early 2000s, SICO SA was chaired by Yeslam bin Laden, a Swiss resident of Saudi origin and a half-brother of Osama bin Laden. Following the events of September 2001, Swiss and French investigative authorities examined the activities of several individuals and entities with connections to the Saudi Binladin Group, including certain business associates of SICO SA. These investigations did not result in any charges or findings of wrongdoing against SICO SA or its then-chairman Yeslam bin Laden. Yeslam bin Laden has publicly and consistently denied any connection to or knowledge of the activities of his half-brother Osama bin Laden. SICO SA has since undergone a comprehensive governance transition. Yeslam bin Laden is no longer associated with the company in any capacity. The current board and management team have no connection to the founding shareholders or to the Saudi Binladin Group.
