= Ghost Wars =

2004 nonfiction book by Steve Coll

- Author: Steve Coll
- Language: English
- Genre: Nonfiction
- Publisher: The Penguin Press
- Publication date: December 28, 2004
- Publication place: United States
- Media type: Print (hardback and paperback)
- Pages: 720
- ISBN: 1-59420-007-6

Ghost Wars: The Secret History of the CIA, Afghanistan, and Bin Laden, from the Soviet Invasion to September 10, 2001, abbreviated as Ghost Wars, is a book written by Steve Coll, published in 2004 by Penguin Press. It won the 2005 Pulitzer Prize for General Nonfiction.

== Summary ==
The book provides an in-depth account of Central Intelligence Agency activity in Afghanistan from the time of the Soviet invasion to the aftermath of attacks on the World Trade Center and the Pentagon. Coll particularly notes the interplay between the CIA and its counterpart in Pakistan, Inter-Services Intelligence, which used CIA and Saudi Arabian funding to build militant Mujahideen training camps along the Pakistan–Afghanistan border in an effort to create radicalized, militant fighters sourced from many Arab countries to attack the Soviet occupation. Invariably, as Coll shows, this decision had long-lasting effects on the region.

== Expanded edition and follow-up ==
- — (2005). Ghost Wars: The Secret History of the CIA, Afghanistan and Bin Laden, from the Soviet Invasion to September 10, 2001. Penguin. ISBN 9780141020808.
- — (2018). Directorate S: The C.I.A. and America's Secret Wars in Afghanistan and Pakistan, 2001–2016. Penguin. ISBN 9781846146602.

Penguin published a slightly expanded edition in 2005 that added the work of the 9/11 Commission.

In 2011, Coll announced a follow-up to Ghost Wars. When asked about a release date for the book, Coll said "It will take a while. ... I'd like the second volume to hold up over time."

== Awards ==
Steve Coll won the 2004 Lionel Gelber Prize for Ghost Wars. The work also received the 2005 Pulitzer Prize for General Nonfiction.

== See also ==
- Charlie Wilson's War: The Extraordinary Story of the Largest Covert Operation in History
