= Wafah Dufour =

American singer-songwriter, socialite, and model (born 1975)

- Born: Wafah bin Ladin; May 23, 1975 (age 51); Los Angeles, California, U.S.
- Education: Geneva University; Columbia University
- Occupations: Singer, songwriter, model, socialite

Wafah Dufour (born Wafah bin Ladin, May 23, 1975) is an American singer-songwriter, socialite, and model.

== Early life and education ==
Wafah bin Ladin was born on May 23, 1975 (although some reports have given 1978 or 1980) in Los Angeles, California. Her father, Yeslam bin Ladin (paternal half brother of Osama bin Laden), is a Saudi of Yemeni and Iranian origin and her mother, Carmen bin Laden, is of Swiss father and Iranian mother (from the Iranian noble family Sheybani). She has Swiss nationality by her mother and United States nationality by birth.

Wafah Dufour spent the early part of her life in Los Angeles, then Jeddah, Saudi Arabia, but later moved to Geneva, Switzerland, with her parents. In 1988, her parents separated and finally divorced in January 2006. Her father and his family have reportedly not spoken to either her or her two younger sisters since she was 15 years old. She changed her last name to her mother's maiden name, Dufour.

She earned a law degree from Geneva University, and a master's degree from Columbia Law School in New York City. She speaks French (her mother tongue), English, and Persian.

== Career ==
=== Television ===
In early 2006, publisher Judith Regan signed Dufour to appear in a reality television show which planned to follow her battle for success in the music industry in a fly-on-the-wall documentary. In the end, the project was canceled due to lingering resentments about the September 11 attacks.

=== Music ===
In 2009, she was recording her first album while living in London and set to collaborate with Atlanta rock band Black Lips.

In 2016, Wafah composed Nimrod Kamer's song, "Nimmy and the Hose".

As of 2019, Dufour was lead singer of the band Deep Tan, based in East London. Other band members included Celeste Guinness and Melia Beaudoin.
