= Steve Coll =

American journalist (born 1958)

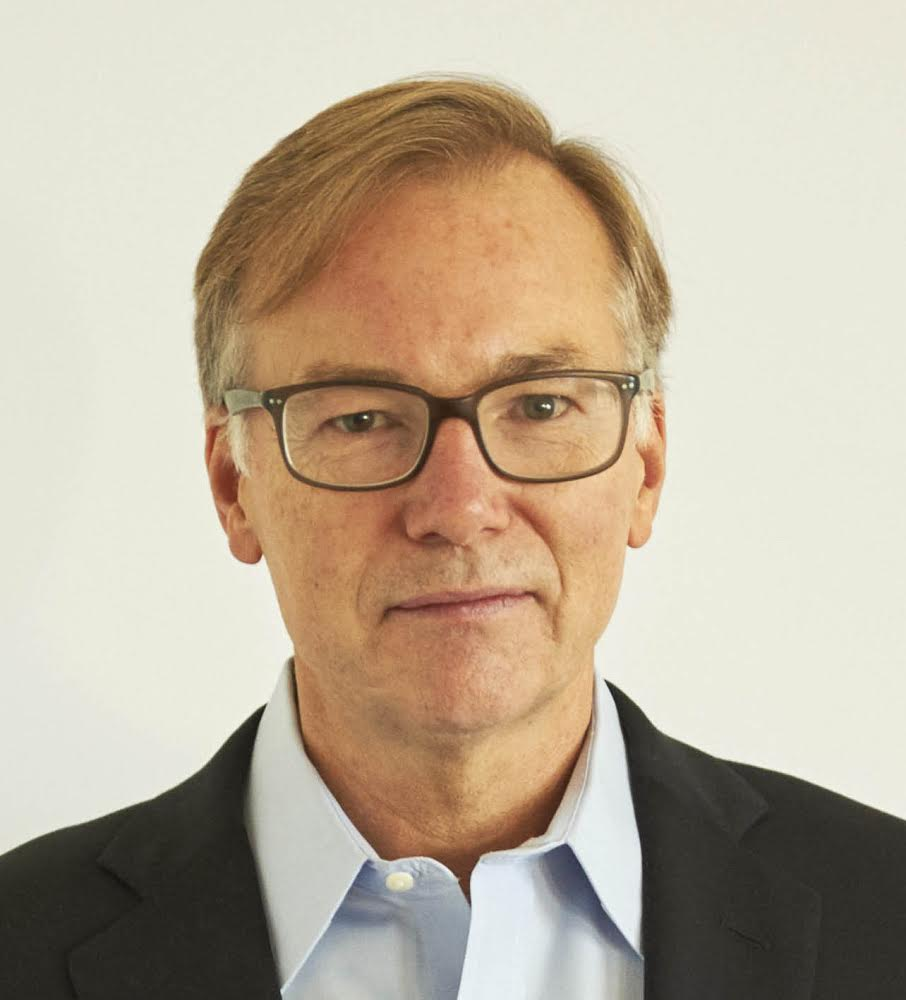
- Coll in 2012
- Born: October 8, 1958 (age 68); Washington, D.C., U.S.
- Education: Occidental College (BA); University of Sussex
- Occupations: Journalist, author, business executive
- Spouse: Eliza Griswold
- Children: 4
- Writing career
- Genre: Journalism
- Notable works: Ghost Wars; The Bin Ladens: An Arabian Family in the American Century (2008)
- Notable awards: Pulitzer Prize for Explanatory Reporting (1990); Pulitzer Prize for General Nonfiction (2005)

Steve Coll (born October 8, 1958) is an American journalist, historian, academic, and executive.

He was dean of the Columbia University Graduate School of Journalism, where he also served as the Henry R. Luce Professor of Journalism until 2022. A staff writer for The New Yorker, he served as the president and CEO of the New America think tank from 2007 to 2012.

He is the recipient of two Pulitzer Prize awards, two Overseas Press Club Awards, a PEN American Center John Kenneth Galbraith Award, two Arthur Ross Book Awards, a Livingston Award, a Robert F. Kennedy Journalism Award, a Financial Times and Goldman Sachs Business Book of the Year Award, and the Lionel Gelber Prize. From 2012 to 2013, he was a voting member of the Pulitzer Prize Board before continuing to serve in an ex officio capacity as the dean of the Columbia Journalism School.

== Early life and family ==
Steve Coll was born on October 8, 1958, in Washington, D.C. He attended Thomas S. Wootton High School in Rockville, Maryland, graduating in 1976. Following high school, he moved to Los Angeles, California, and enrolled in Occidental College, where he was a member of Phi Beta Kappa. In 1980, he graduated cum laude with majors in English and history. Coll also attended the University of Sussex during his studies.

Coll is married to the journalist and poet Eliza Griswold.

== Career ==
=== Journalism ===
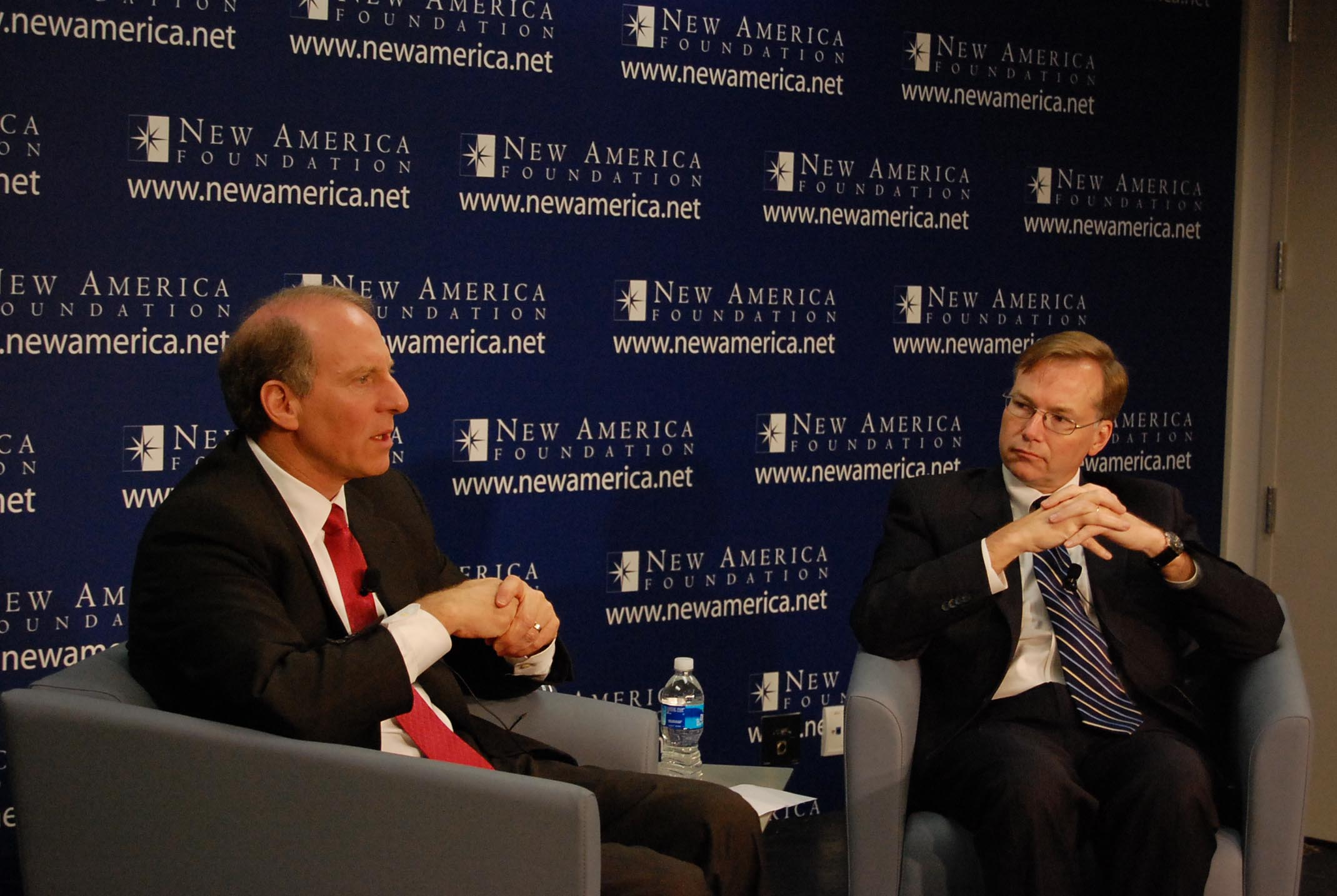
Coll (right) with Richard N. Haass, President of the Council on Foreign Relations

After college, Coll wrote for the Pasadena Weekly. He then wrote general-interest articles for California magazine.

In 1985, he started working for The Washington Post as a general assignment feature writer for the paper's Style section. Two years later, he was promoted to serve as the financial correspondent for the newspaper, based in New York City. He and David A. Vise collaborated on a series of reports scrutinizing the Securities and Exchange Commission for which they received the 1990 Pulitzer Prize for Explanatory Reporting and the Gerald Loeb Award for Large Newspapers. In 1989, he moved to New Delhi, when he was appointed as the Post's South Asia bureau chief. He served as a foreign correspondent through 1995.

Coll began working for the newspaper's Sunday magazine insert in 1995, serving as publisher of the magazine from 1996 to 1998. He was promoted to managing editor of the newspaper in 1998 and served in that capacity through 2004. He has also served as an associate editor for the newspaper from late 2004 to August 2005.

From September 2005 through December 2023, Coll was a member of the writing staff of The New Yorker. Based in Washington, D.C., he reported on foreign intelligence and national security. Since the beginning of 2024 he has been visiting senior editor at The Economist.

=== New America Foundation ===
On July 23, 2007, Coll was named as the next director of the New America Foundation, a non-profit, non-partisan think tank headquartered in Washington, D.C. He has also contributed to the New York Review of Books, particularly about the war in Afghanistan. On June 25, 2012, Coll announced his resignation as President of the New America Foundation to pen a follow-up to Ghost Wars.

On October 23, 2012, Coll was elected to the Pulitzer Prize Board, administered by Columbia University.

=== Columbia University Graduate School of Journalism ===
On March 18, 2013, it was announced that Coll would succeed Nick Lemann as the dean of the Columbia University Graduate School of Journalism, effective July 1, 2013.

=== Publications ===
Coll's The Achilles Trap was published in 2024 to positive reviews, with The New York Times writing that it offers, "a more intimate picture of the dictator [Saddam Hussein]’s thinking about world politics, local power and his relationship to the United States than has been seen before". The Washington Post argued that despite its holistic picture of Hussein, Coll failed to accurately portray the CIA's motivations. In a March 2024 interview, Coll told PBS that the contributions by Hussein were missing from Americans' understanding of the war.

== Honors and awards ==
- 1990: Pulitzer Prize for Explanatory Reporting (co-winner with David A. Vise)
- 1992: Livingston Award for International Reporting for "Crisis and Change in South Asia," The Washington Post (winner)
- 2000: Robert F. Kennedy Journalism Award for "Peace Without Justice: A Journey to the Wounded Heart of Africa," The Washington Post (1st Prize: International Print)
- 2000: Ed Cunningham Award for "Peace Without Justice: A Journey to the Wounded Heart of Africa", The Washington Post
- 2004: Lionel Gelber Prize for Ghost Wars: The Secret History of the CIA, Afghanistan, and Bin Laden, from the Soviet Invasion to September 10, 2001 (winner)
- 2004: Cornelius Ryan Award for Ghost Wars: The Secret History of the CIA, Afghanistan, and Bin Laden, from the Soviet Invasion to September 10, 2001 (winner)
- 2005: Pulitzer Prize for General Nonfiction for Ghost Wars: The Secret History of the CIA, Afghanistan, and Bin Laden, from the Soviet Invasion to September 10, 2001 (winner)
- 2005: Arthur Ross Book Award for Ghost Wars: The Secret History of the CIA, Afghanistan, and Bin Laden, from the Soviet Invasion to September 10, 2001 (winner)
- 2008: National Book Critics Circle Award (biography) for The Bin Ladens: An Arabian Family in the American Century (finalist)
- 2009: PEN/John Kenneth Galbraith Award for The Bin Ladens: An Arabian Family in the American Century (winner)
- 2010: Edward Weintal Prize for Diplomatic Reporting
- 2012: Financial Times and Goldman Sachs Business Book of the Year Award for Private Empire (winner)
- 2012: National Book Critics Circle Award (nonfiction) for Private Empire (finalist)
- 2018: National Book Critics Circle Award (nonfiction) for Directorate S (winner)
- 2024: Orwell Prize for Political Writing for The Achilles Trap (shortlisted)
- 2025: Arthur Ross Book Award for The Achilles Trap

== Bibliography ==
- Coll, Steve (1986). The Deal of the Century: The Breakup of AT&T. Atheneum. ISBN 9780689117572. OCLC 312023490.
- — (1987). The Taking of Getty Oil: The Full Story of the Most Spectacular & Catastrophic Takeover of All Time. Scribner. ISBN 9780689118609.
- Vise, David A. & Steve Coll (1991). Eagle on the Street: Based on the Pulitzer Prize–Winning Account of the SEC's Battle with Wall Street. New York: Scribner's. ISBN 0684193140.
- Coll, Steve (1993). On the Grand Trunk Road: A Journey into South Asia. Crown Press. ISBN 9780812920260.
- — (2004). Ghost Wars: The Secret History of the CIA, Afghanistan and Bin Laden, from the Soviet Invasion to September 10, 2001. Penguin. ISBN 9781594200076.
- — (2008). The Bin Ladens: An Arabian Family in the American Century. Penguin. ISBN 9781616792527.
- — (2012). Private Empire: ExxonMobil and American Power. Penguin. ISBN 9781594203350.
- — (2018). Directorate S: The C.I.A. and America's Secret Wars in Afghanistan and Pakistan, 2001–2016. Penguin Press. ISBN 9781846146602.
- — (2024). The Achilles Trap: Saddam Hussein, the C.I.A., and the Origins of America's Invasion of Iraq. Penguin Press. ISBN 9780525562269.

== Podcasts ==
- Coll, Steve (November 23, 2015). "ISIS After Paris". The New Yorker (Podcast).
- — (August 1, 2016). "Defying Conventions". The New Yorker (Podcast).
- — (August 29, 2016). "Images of War". The New Yorker (Podcast).
- — (September 26, 2016). "The Fear Factor". The New Yorker (Podcast).
- — (April 10, 2017). "Trump's Intervention". The New Yorker (Podcast).
