= Bin Laden family =

Saudi business family

Bin Laden family عائلة بن لادن
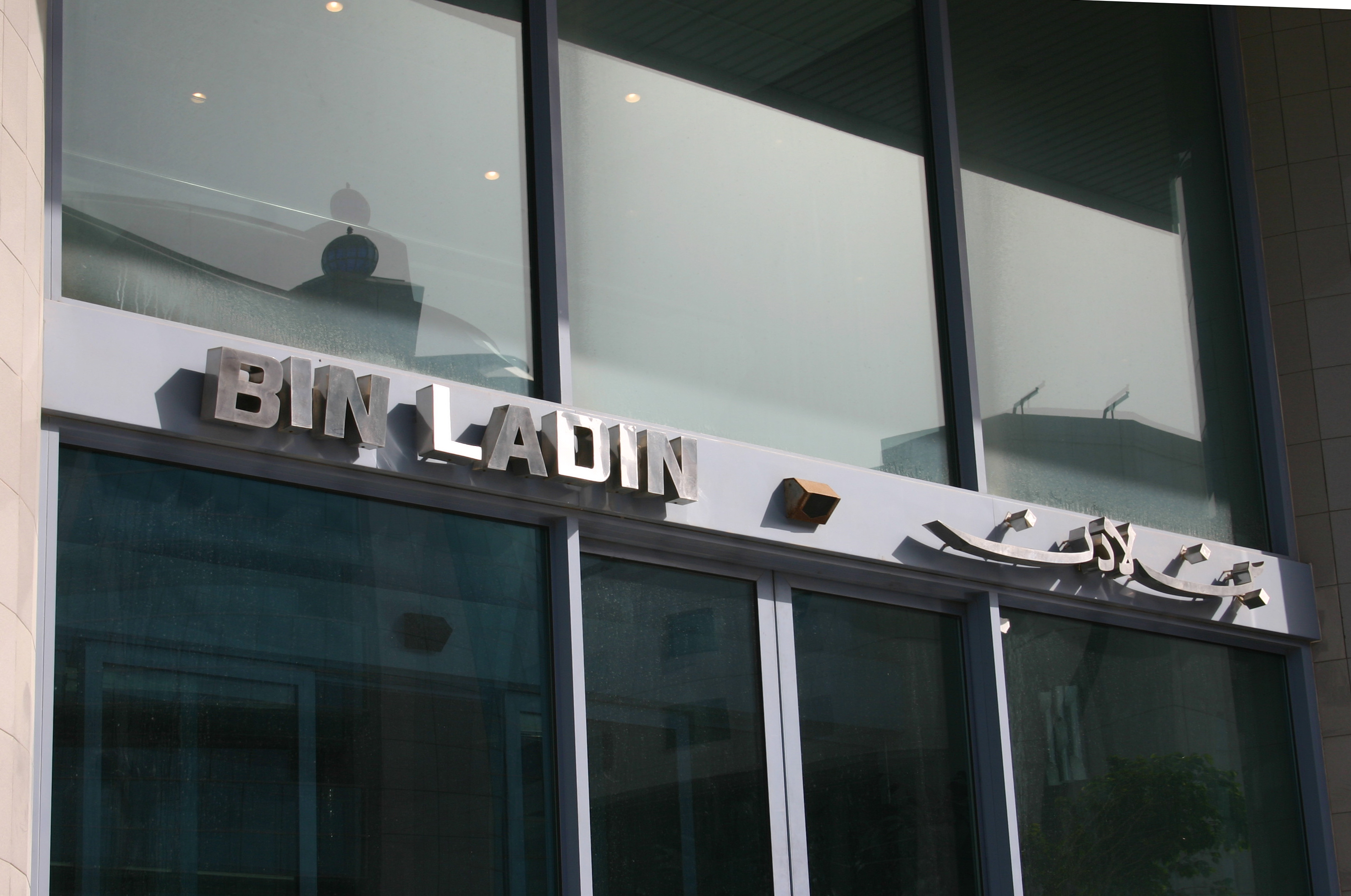
- Entrance to the Dubai headquarters of the Saudi Binladin Group
- Current region: Arabian Peninsula
- Origin: Hadhramaut, Yemen
- Members: Muhammad bin Laden; Osama bin Laden (see Family members)

The bin Laden family (Arabic: عائلة بن لادن, romanized: ʿāʾila bin Lādin), also spelled bin Ladin, is a wealthy Saudi family intimately connected with the innermost circles of the Saudi royal family. It is the namesake and former controlling shareholder of the Saudi Binladin Group, a multinational construction firm.

Following the September 11 attacks in 2001, the family became the subject of media attention and scrutiny due to the activities of Osama bin Laden, the former head of al-Qaeda; they had publicly disowned him in 1994.

== Origins ==
The family traces its origins to Awad bin Laden from the village of al-Rubat, in the Wadi Doan of the Tarim Valley, Hadramout governorate, Yemen. Awad's son was Mohammed bin Awad bin Laden (1908–1967), a native of the Hadhramaut region in eastern Yemen, who, like many other Hadharem, emigrated to Saudi Arabia prior to World War I. He set up a construction company and came to Abdul Aziz ibn Saud's attention through construction projects, later being awarded contracts for major renovations in Mecca. He made his initial fortune from exclusive rights to construct all mosques and other religious buildings not only in Saudi Arabia, but as far as Ibn Saud's influence reached. Until his death, Mohammed had exclusive control over restorations at the Jami Al-Aqsa in Jerusalem. Soon, the bin Laden corporate network extended far beyond just construction sites.

Mohammed's special intimacy with the monarchy was inherited by the younger bin Laden generation. Mohammed's sons attended Victoria College, Alexandria, Egypt. Their schoolmates included King Hussein of Jordan, Zaid Al Rifai, the Kashoggi brothers (whose father was one of the king's physicians), Kamal Adham (who ran the General Intelligence Directorate under King Faisal), present-day contractors Mohammed Al Attas, Fahd Shobokshi, Ghassan Sakr, and actor Omar Sharif.

When Mohammed bin Laden died in 1967, his son Salem bin Laden took over the family enterprises, until his own accidental death in 1988.

== Notable family members ==
Western intelligence officials estimate that all the relatives of the family may number as many as 600. In 1994, the bin Laden family disowned Osama bin Laden, and the Saudi government revoked his passport. The Saudi government also stripped Osama of his citizenship for publicly speaking out against the government for permitting U.S. troops to be based in Saudi Arabia in preparation for the Gulf War (1990–1991).

The groupings of the bin Laden family, based on the nationalities of the wives, include the most prominent "Saudi group", a "Syrian group", a "Lebanese group", and an "Egyptian group". The Egyptian group employs 40,000 people, most likely the country's largest private foreign investor. Osama was born the only son of Muhammed bin Laden's tenth wife, Hamida al-Attas, who was of Syrian origin, making Osama a member of the Syrian group.

=== First generation ===
- Muhammed bin Awad bin Laden (1908–1967) was the family patriarch and founder; before World War I, Muhammed, originally poor and uneducated, emigrated from Hadhramaut, on the south coast of Yemen, to the Red Sea port of Jeddah, Saudi Arabia, where he began to work as a porter. Starting his own business in 1930, Muhammed built his fortune as a building contractor for the Saudi royal family during the 1950s. Married 22 times, with 54 children, his 17th child was Osama bin Laden, who was the son of Hamida al-Attas (born in Syria), Muhammed’s tenth wife. The couple divorced soon after Osama was born, and Hamida was given in marriage to one of the executives of Muhammed's company around 1958. In 1967, Muhammed was killed in an airplane crash in Saudi Arabia when his pilot misjudged a landing.
- Muhammad al-Attas is Osama's stepfather in whose household Osama was raised at Jeddah, and worked at the bin Laden company. The couple had four children in addition to Osama: three boys and a girl, Fatima Mohammed al-Attas.
- Abdallah bin Laden is the brother of Mohammed and the uncle of Osama; headed the Saudi Binladin Group (SBG); died in Medina, March 21, 2002, at age 75. He also had over 60 children and was married 6 times.

=== Second generation ===
- Salem bin Laden (1946–1988) attended Millfield, the English boarding school. He took over the family empire in 1967 upon the death of his father; also an amateur rock guitarist in the 1970s. He married an English art student, Caroline Carey, whose half-brother, Ambrose, is the son of the Marquess of Queensberry. Salem died outside San Antonio, Texas in 1988, when an experimental ultralight plane that he was flying got tangled in power lines.
- Tarek bin Laden (born 1947); once called "the personification of the dichotomy (conservatism and change) of Saudi Arabia".
- Bakr bin Laden (born 1946) succeeded Salem as the chairman of the Saudi Binladin Group; major power broker in Jeddah.
- Hassan bin Laden, senior vice president of the SBG.
- Yehia bin Laden, also active in the SBG; in 2001, owned 16 percent of Cambridge, MA-based Aceragen Inc..
- Mahrous bin Laden, implicated in the Grand Mosque Seizure carried out by dissidents against the Saudi ruling family at the Masjid al-Haram in Makkah on November 20, 1979. This event shook the Muslim world with the ensuing violence and the killing of hundreds at the holiest of Islamic sites. Trucks owned by the family were reported to have been used to smuggle arms into the tightly controlled city. The bin Laden connection was through the son of a Sultan of Yemen who had been radicalized by Syrian members of the Muslim Brotherhood. Mahrous was arrested for a time, but was not beheaded by the Saudi government alongside 63 others who were, with their public executions broadcast live on Saudi television. Later exonerated, he joined the family business and became manager of the Medina branch of the bin Laden enterprises and a member of the board.
- Osama bin Laden (born 1957 in Saudi Arabia, died May 2, 2011, in Pakistan) who co-founded the Islamic Military group Al-Qaeda, which CIA and FBI claim that was responsible for the attacks such as the 1998 United States embassy bombings, the 2002 Bali bombings, and most infamously, the September 11 attacks. His death was announced on May 2, 2011. He was one of the FBI's Most Wanted Terrorists.
- Najwa Ghanem (born 1958), became the first wife of Osama in 1974. A first cousin, she was his mother's niece. She co-authored Growing Up bin Laden with her son Omar.
- Yeslam bin Ladin (born 1950) studied in the 1970s at the University of Southern California, in Los Angeles; settled in Switzerland; became a Swiss citizen in 2001; Geneva-based head of the family's European holding company, the Saudi Investment Company; was scrutinized by Swiss and American investigators because of a financial stake he has in a Swiss aviation firm; he has claimed to not have had contact with Osama since 1981
- Abdullah bin Laden (born 1965); a graduate of Harvard Law School, Abdullah lived in Cambridge, Massachusetts on 9/11, and was the only bin Laden relative to remain in the United States, staying in Boston for almost a month following the attacks.
- Shafig bin Laden, the half-brother of Osama, was a guest of honour at the Carlyle Group's Washington conference at the Ritz-Carlton Hotel on September 11, 2001, and was among the 13 members of the family to leave the United States on September 19, 2001, aboard flight N521DB.

=== Third generation ===
- Wafah Dufour (born 1975), daughter of Yeslam bin Laden, is an American model and aspiring singer-songwriter. She spent the early part of her life in Jeddah, Saudi Arabia. Dufour, her little sisters Najia (1981) and Noor (1987), her mother (1955) and her father (1950) then moved to Geneva, Switzerland. In 1988, her parents separated. She earned a law diploma at Geneva Law School (Switzerland) and later a master's degree from Columbia Law School in the United States. She lived in Manhattan until around the time of the September 11, 2001 attacks, but was staying in Geneva for a summer holiday at the time of the attacks.
- Abdullah Osama bin Laden (born 1976), son of Osama and Najwa. Although, as the eldest son his father originally showed him some favor, taking him into Afghanistan in 1984 when he was only eight, Abdullah later became disgusted with life in Sudan, moved back to Jiddah to marry his first cousin, refused to rejoin his father in Sudan, except for a brief, unpleasant visit, and never saw or communicated with his father again after 1995. Abdullah resides in Jiddah, where he runs his own firm, called Fame Advertising; he has been closely watched by the Saudi government, which restricted his travel from the kingdom after 1996, at least for a time; he stated that the media have misrepresented his father.
- Abdul Rahman bin Laden (born 1979), the second son of Osama and Najwa. As a child he was born with hydrocephalus, and his father took him to the United Kingdom for medical treatment. However, he refused to allow British surgeons to operate on the boy and tried to treat him himself using a folk remedy of honey. He ended up having an intellectual disability and autism. As an adult he moved to Syria with his mother in 2011.
- Saad bin Laden (1979–2009) son of Osama and Najwa. He was described by his family as an irrepressible chatterbox who sometimes blurted out intimate personal information. His family described him as somewhat autistic, impulsive, unrestrained, anxious, easily confused, and thus completely unfit for clandestine action. With all of Osama's other children, Saad accompanied Osama on his exile to Sudan from 1991 to 1996, and then to Afghanistan. In Sudan in 1998, he married Wafa', a Sudanese woman born of Yemeni parents. In September 2001, Saad was sent away by his father with his father's other three wives and the younger children. In March 2002, they made their way into Iran at Zabol. As stated by Cathy Scott-Clark and Adrian Levy, “As the oldest son present, Saad was nominally head of the bin Laden family party, but given his mental issues his aunt, Osama’s wife Khairiah, took charge.” Saad was erroneously blamed for the bombing of a Tunisian synagogue on April 11, 2002 and then implicated in the May 12, 2003, suicide bombing in Riyadh, and the Morocco bombing four days later, all of which was impossible as he was neither personally able to order or command anything, and he was also held in Iran, mostly in prison-like conditions, for almost six and a half years, from March 2002 to August 2008. Saad escaped from Iran in August 2008 and fled to Pakistan, where he wandered haplessly for eleven months hoping to find his father, who, however, did not want him to come, for fear he would reveal his hiding place. Saad was later killed incidentally, without being specifically targeted, in a U.S. drone strike in North Waziristan on 17 July 2009. Al-Qaeda leader Ayman al-Zawahiri confirmed Saad's death in a videotape three years later.
- Omar bin Laden (born 1981) son of Osama and Najwa; Omar accompanied Osama on his exile to Sudan from 1991 to 1996, and then to Afghanistan. He returned to Saudi Arabia after an apparent falling-out with his father over Omar's disagreement with violence. For a while, Omar ran his own company in Jeddah as a contractor. Omar has one son, Ahmed, by his ex-wife, whom he had divorced 3 times by 2006. In September 2006, he married Zaina and they are now said to be living in a secret location in Qatar. He is now reported to be living in Normandie, France, with his wife.
- Mohammad bin Osama bin Laden (born 1983), the son of Osama and Najwa, married the daughter of al-Qaeda leader Mohammed Atef in January 2001, at Kandahar, Afghanistan, with footage broadcast by Al-Jazeera, where three of Osama's step-siblings and Osama's mother were in attendance.
- Hamza bin Laden (1989–2017/2019), also the son of Osama, was groomed to be Osama's heir following Saad's death. On February 28, 2019, the U.S. State Department offered a reward of up to $1 million for information on Hamza bin Laden's whereabouts. The announcement described Hamza bin Laden as a "key leader" of Al-Qaeda who had released audio and video messages on the internet calling for attacks on the U.S. and its western allies to avenge his father's killing. On July 31, 2019, it was reported that Hamza bin Laden was believed to have been killed in the first two years of the first Trump administration, which began on January 20, 2017. On September 14, 2019, U.S. President Donald Trump confirmed that Hamza bin Laden was killed in a U.S. counter-terrorism operation in the Afghanistan/Pakistan region. Other details were not disclosed.
- Khaled bin Laden, son of Osama, was killed along with his father at Abbottabad, Pakistan, May 2, 2011.
- Abdul Aziz bin Laden, manages the SBG's Egyptian operations; ranked Number 2 in the 2006 UAE National Superstock Bike Championship.

== Muhammad bin Ladin's children ==
These are confirmed children of Muhammad bin Ladin, of which there were reportedly around 52.

Name	Sex	Ref
Abdul Aziz bin Laden	M	
Abdullah bin Laden	M	
Ahmed bin Laden	M	
Ali bin Laden	M	
Bakr bin Laden	M	
Ghalib bin Laden	M	
Haider bin Laden	M	
Hassan bin Laden	M	
Ibrahim bin Laden	M	
Khalil bin Laden	M	
Mahrous bin Laden	M	
Mohammed bin Laden	M	
Najiah bin Laden	F	
Omar bin Laden	M	
Osama bin Laden	M	
Randa bin Laden	F	
Saad bin Laden	M	
Salem bin Laden	M	
Shafig bin Laden	M	
Tarek bin Laden	M	
Thabet bin Laden	M	
Yehia bin Laden	M	
Yeslam bin Laden	M	
Zakaria al-Sadah	M	

== Osama bin Laden's wives and children ==
Najwa Ghanem married 1974 divorced 2001	Khadijah Sharif married 1983 divorced 1993	Khairiah Sabir married 1985	Siham Sabir married 1987	Unnamed married, marriage annulled 1996	Amal al-Sadah married 2000
Abdallah ♂ (b. 1976); Abdul Al-Rahman ♂ (b. 1978); Saad ♂ (1979–2009); Omar ♂ (b. 1981); Osman ♂ (b. 1983); Muhammad ♂ (b. 1985); Fatima ♀ (b. 1987); Iman ♀ (b. 1990); Ladin "Bakir" ♂ (b. 1993); Rukhaiya ♀ (b. 1997); Nour ♀ (b. 1999 or 2000)	Ali ♂ (b. 1984 or 1986); Amer ♂ (b. 1990); Aisha ♀ (b. 1992)	Hamza ♂ (b. 1989 or 1991, possibly died in 2019)	Kadhija ♀ (1989–2009); Khalid ♂ (1989–2011); Miriam ♀ (b. 1990); Sumaiya ♀ (b. 1992)	None	Safiyah ♀ (b. 2001); Aasia ♀ (b. 2003); Ibrahim ♂ (b. 2004); Zainab ♀ (b. 2006); Hussain ♂ (b. 2008)

== Bin Laden flights ==
Around 13 members of the bin Laden family, alongside their associates and bodyguards, flew out of the United States on a chartered flight with Ryan International Airlines (Ryan International Flight 441), eight days after the September 11, 2001, terrorist attacks, according to a passenger manifest released on July 21, 2004. The passenger list was obtained and released by Senator Frank Lautenberg (D-NJ), who acquired it from officials at Boston's Logan International Airport. None of the flights, domestic or international, took place before the reopening of national airspace on the morning of September 13 and the 9/11 Commission found "no evidence of a political intervention".

Among the passengers with the bin Laden surname were Omar Awad bin Laden, who had lived with Osama's son Abdallah Awad bin Laden, who was involved in forming the U.S. branch of the World Assembly of Muslim Youth in Alexandria, and Shafig bin Laden, a half brother of Osama's who was reportedly attending the annual investor conference of the Carlyle Group. Also on board was Akberali Moawalla, an official with the investment company run by Yeslam bin Ladin, another of Osama bin Laden's half brothers. Records show that a passenger, Kholoud Kurdi, lived in Northern Virginia with a bin Laden relative.

The 9/11 Commission found that the "FBI conducted a satisfactory screening of Saudi nationals who left the United States on charter flights. The Saudi government was advised of and agreed to the FBI's requirements that passengers be identified and checked against various databases before the flights departed. The Federal Aviation Administration representative working in the FBI operations center made sure that the FBI was aware of the flights of Saudi nationals and was able to screen the passengers before they were allowed to depart."
