= Saad bin Laden =

Saudi terrorist, Osama bin Laden's son (1979–2009)

Saad bin Laden سعد بن لادن
- Born: Saad bin Osama bin Muhammad bin 'Awad bin Laden; 1979; Jeddah, Saudi Arabia
- Died: 2009 (aged 29–30); Pakistan
- Military career
- Allegiance: Al-Qaeda
- Conflicts: War on terror: War in Afghanistan; War in North-West Pakistan

Saʻd bin ʾUsāmah bin Muḥammad bin ʿAwaḍ bin Lādin (Arabic: سعد بن أسامة بن محمد بن عوض بن لادن; 1979 – 2009), better known as Saad bin Laden, was one of Osama bin Laden's sons. While it was alleged by western sources that he was active in al-Qaeda, and was being groomed to be his heir apparent, these claims have been debunked by later information which has emerged. He was killed in an American drone strike in 2009. The U.S. said they were not specifically targeting him.

Later his father was killed (and other al-Qaeda members); and even later another son of his was allegedly killed, Hamza bin Laden (though unconfirmed 2024 media reports dispute that).

== Life ==
Born in 1979 in Jeddah, to the wealthy Bin Laden family. His paternal grandmother is a Syrian national called Hamida al-Attas. An irrepressible chatterbox who sometimes blurted out intimate personal information, Saad was somewhat autistic, impulsive, unrestrained, anxious, easily confused, and thus completely unfit for clandestine action. With all of Osama's other children, Saad accompanied Osama on his exile to Sudan from 1991 to 1996, and then to Afghanistan. In Sudan in 1998, he married Wafa', a Sudanese woman born of Yemeni parents.

In November 2001, Saad was sent away by his father with his father's three wives who were still with him and his younger children. In March 2002, they made their way into Iran at Zabol. As stated by Cathy Scott-Clark and Adrian Levy, “As the oldest son present, Saad was nominally head of the Bin Laden family party, but given his mental issues his aunt, Osama’s wife Khairiah, took charge.” Saad was erroneously blamed for the bombing of a Tunisian synagogue on April 11, 2002 and then allegedly implicated in the May 12, 2003, suicide bombing in Riyadh, and the Morocco bombing four days later, all of which was impossible as he was neither personally able to order or command anything, and he was also held in Iran, mostly in prison-like conditions, for almost six and a half years, from March 2002 to August 2008. Saad escaped from Iran in August 2008 and fled to Pakistan, where he wandered haplessly for eleven months hoping to find his father, who, however, did not want him to come, for fear he would reveal his hiding place. He was able to communicate with his brother Khalid, but he was not invited to proceed to Abbottabad. Nevertheless, in letters Saad did express his support for his father and his project.

== Death ==
Saad was killed incidentally, without being specifically targeted, in a U.S. drone strike in North Waziristan in 2009. He was buried in an unmarked plot outside of Razmak, Pakistan. While some uncertainty about his fate lingered for a time, letters retrieved from the compound where Osama bin Laden was killed in Abbottabad, Pakistan confirmed that Saad was killed. In September 2012, al-Qaeda leader Ayman al-Zawahiri confirmed in a video that Saad was killed in a drone strike.

== Alleged role as heir apparent of Osama bin Laden ==
The main interest in Saad bin Laden has been in his alleged role as heir of his father Osama bin Laden in the latter's leadership of al-Qa'ida and its violent actions. This was specifically alleged by US intelligence sources, and recently has continued to be promoted by the scholar Nelly Lahoud. However, the revelations of the books Growing Up bin Laden and The Exile, both cited above, show that, even though Osama was hoping to promote one of his sons to succeed him, he never contemplated Saad for such a role because of Saad's mental and behavioral unfitness for it. Rather, at first he favored his eldest son Abdullah until Abdullah abandoned his father and his projects in 1995, moving back to Jiddah, then switched his hopes immediately to his fourth son Omar, skipping his second and third sons Abd al-Rahman and Saad because of their mental, emotional, and behavioral unfitness. Omar turned decisively against Osama's projects by 1998-1999, and Osama then began to invest his hopes in his sixth son Muhammad, who alone accompanied him in his flight into 2002, but then was dismissed by him to Iran later in that same year. After that, Osama seems to have abandoned any hopes in his sons, as he even urged Hamza to try to go study traditional Islamic knowledge rather that be a fighter and also seems not to have had a very high opinion of his abilities, and while he exploited Khalid with him in his hideaway, he gave him no independent responsibilities at all, relying more on his daughters Maryam and Sumayyah and his wives, especially Siham.

== See also ==
- Personal life of Osama bin Laden
- Special Activities Division
