= Bakr bin Laden =

Saudi businessman (born 1946)

Bakr bin Laden بكر بن لادن
- Born: Bakr bin Mohammed bin 'Awad bin Laden; 1946 (age 79–80); Mecca, Saudi Arabia
- Citizenship: Saudi Arabia
- Education: University of Miami (BBA)
- Known for: Chairman of Saudi Binladin Group
- Father: Mohammed bin Awad bin Laden

Bakr bin Mohammed bin 'Awad bin Laden (Arabic: بكر بن محمد بن عوض بن لادن; born 1946) is the former chairman of the Jeddah-based Saudi Binladin Group and the former largest shareholder in the group, with a 23.58% holding. He is the son of the family's patriarch, Mohammed bin Awad bin Laden, and a half-brother of Osama bin Laden.

== Education ==
Bakr bin Laden attended college at the University of Miami School of Business at the University of Miami in Coral Gables, Florida in the United States.

== Career ==
Despite the Arabian Peninsula's comparatively small construction sector compared to other regions of the world, Saudi Binladin Group grew substantially under bin Laden's management. Under his leadership, the firm joined with Qatari Diar, a Doha-based real estate company, to launch a joint venture holding company, which is expected to have a significant capital base. The new venture will have two umbrella firms, one of which will carry out large contracting and construction works in Qatar and the rest of the world. It is also currently working to secure a $994.6m contract to design and build 30 parcels in the King Abdullah Financial District in Riyadh.

In April 2018, while under detention by the Saudi government, Bakr transferred his investment stake in Saudi Binladin Group to the government of Saudi Arabia.

== Arrest ==
On 4 November 2017, Bakr bin Laden was arrested in Saudi Arabia in a corruption crackdown conducted by a new royal anti-corruption committee and detained without trial. Bakr was initially detained at the Ritz-Carlton in Riyadh and later held in a publicly-unknown location. The Saudi government seized the deed to a villa owned by Bakr overlooking the Red Sea.

In January 2019, Bakr bin Laden and several other detainees were released by the Saudi government. In addition to bin Laden, those released include Mohammed Hussein Al Amoudi, a businessman with substantial investments in Ethiopia and with Amr Dabbagh, a former government minister who once led the Saudi Arabian General Investment Authority, which is designed to attract foreign investment in Saudi Arabia. His release followed global pressure on the Saudi government and Crown Prince Mohammed bin Salman following the assassination of Jamal Khashoggi by Saudi agents at the Saudi consulate in Istanbul.

== See also ==
- Bin Laden family
