= Muhammad bin Ladin =

Saudi business magnate (1908–1967)

- مُحَمَّد بْنُ لَادِن
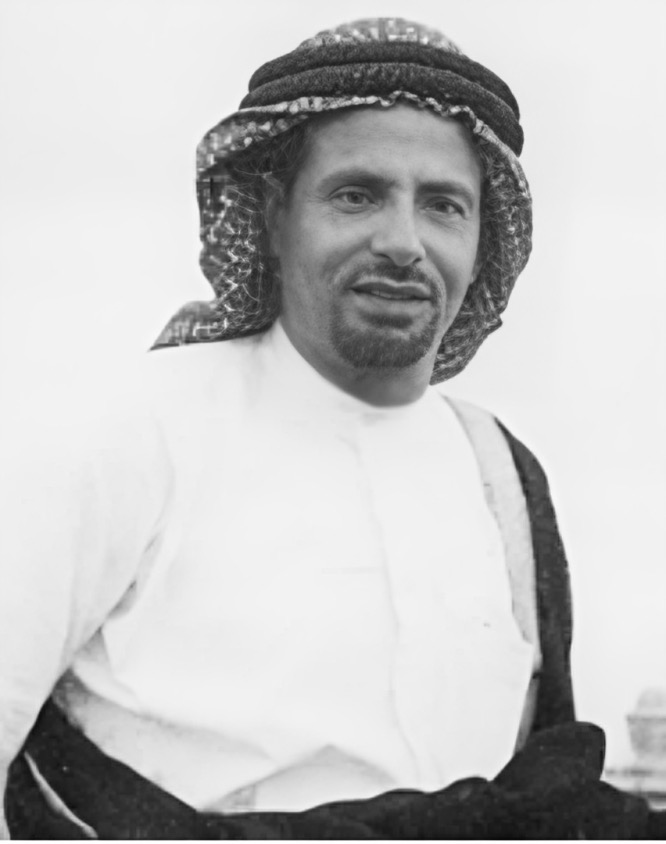
- Born: Muhammad bin Awad bin Ladin c. 1908; Qu'aiti, Aden Protectorate (present-day Yemen)
- Died: 3 September 1967 (aged 58–59); Usran, 'Asir Province, Saudi Arabia
- Cause of death: Plane crash
- Citizenship: Saudi Arabia
- Known for: Founder of Saudi Binladin Group
- Spouse: 22 wives
- Children: 52, including Osama, Salem, Bakr, Tarek and Yeslam

Muhammad bin Awad bin Ladin (Arabic: مُحَمَّد بْنُ لَادِن, romanized: Muḥammad bin Lādin; c. 1908 – 3 September 1967) was a Yemeni-born Saudi billionaire business magnate working primarily in the construction industry. He founded what is today the Saudi Binladin Group and became the wealthiest non-royal Saudi, establishing the wealth and prestige of the bin Ladin family. He was the father of Osama bin Laden.

== Life ==
Muhammad bin Ladin was born on the Hadramawt coast of south Yemen to Awad, a Kindite Hadrami tribesman from al-Rubat, a village in Wadi Doan. His year of birth is often given as 1908, although this is an approximation at best, as no central government had solidified control over the area at the time and no birth registry existed. Muhammad's paternal grandfather was Abud, the son of Ali, one of four brothers (the others being Ahmad, Mansur, and Zayd) from whom the four Banu Ladin clans trace their ancestry.

Poor and uneducated, Muhammad and his younger brother Abdullah (c. 1913–2002) (not to be confused with other 'Abdullah bin Ladens') emigrated to Tihamah before World War I. According to Eric Margolis, he initially worked as a porter in Jeddah, like many other impoverished Yemenite emigrants of that time. However, Salon.com reports that his first job was as a bricklayer with Aramco. In 1931, he started his own construction business and after coming to the attention of Abdul Aziz Ibn Saud, the first monarch of Saudi Arabia, he eventually achieved such success that his family became known as "the wealthiest non-royal family in the kingdom."

Muhammad bin Ladin strategically built strong ties with the Saudi royal family by actively participating in King Abdel Aziz's public meetings. Recognizing the aging king's mobility challenges, Muhammad took the initiative to construct a ramp at the palace in Jeddah, allowing the monarch to easily move between the floors in his car.

Muhammad's remarkable financial success was ascribed to a shrewd business sense, fealty to Saudi Arabia's rulers, reliability, and a willingness to offer the lowest bid on construction contracts. By undercutting local construction firms, he had become a multi-millionaire by the 1940s. He cultivated a sizable workforce involved in projects across Saudi Arabia. In 1948, Muhammad scored a major breakthrough by securing a commission to build a palace for the future King Saud. In the early 1950s, when a British company withdrew from a contract to construct a crucial road from Jeddah to Medina, Muhammad stepped in to fill the void, solidifying his role as a key player in Saudi Arabia's construction landscape.

As the "royal builder," Muhammad bin Ladin maintained close relationships with the royal family, particularly Prince Faisal of Saudi Arabia. In 1964, Prince Faisal deposed his half-brother, King Saud, and began rebuilding the kingdom after the wasteful excesses of the Saud era. King Faisal accepted Muhammad bin Ladin's offer of financial assistance to support the national economy and as a reward, King Faisal issued a royal decree awarding all future construction projects to Muhammad bin Ladin's construction company. As a result, bin Ladin's company eventually amassed assets in excess of US$5 billion. He made his initial fortune from exclusive rights to all mosque and other religious building construction in Saudi Arabia and several other Arab countries. Until 1967, Muhammad bin Ladin held exclusive responsibility for restorations at the Jami Al-Aqsa in Jerusalem.

Despite his royal associations and great wealth, Muhammad bin Ladin lived a relatively simple and devout life, demanding that his children observe a strict religious and moral code. In his later years, the bin Ladin corporate network diversified its activities beyond construction, largely in foreign investment and oil.

== Religion ==
He was reportedly raised as a Wahhabi Muslim, noted for his religious devotion and he would fly by private helicopter to pray at Mecca, Medina and al-Aqsa (in Jerusalem) in the same day.

== Wives and children ==
He fathered a total of 52 children by 22 wives.

His widely-known son was the founder of al-Qaeda, Osama bin Laden, although the two seldom saw each other. Osama's mother, Hamida al-Attas, was born and raised in Syria before marrying Muhammad bin Ladin and moving to Saudi Arabia. She was non-traditional, known more for wearing Chanel trouser suits rather than the veiled, conservative attire typical of Saudi women. She was neither Wahhabi nor Saudi, and her foreign origin diminished her status within the conservative Saudi family where she became known as "the slave wife".

According to Carmen bin Ladin, Muhammad was planning to wed a 23rd wife the night he died, and was heading there when his plane crashed.

== Death ==
On 3 September 1967, Muhammad bin Ladin and his personal American pilot James C. Harrington (26 July 1918) were killed when bin Ladin's airplane, a Beechcraft G18S, crashed during landing in Usran, 'Asir Province, in southwest Saudi Arabia. Following the crash, Muhammad's body was carefully retrieved and prepared for burial.

At dawn the next day, a somber procession conveyed his body from the palace to a family plot in a nearby cemetery. The news of his passing brought profound sadness, as Muhammad was highly esteemed both within the bin Ladin family and amongst the people of Jeddah. The funeral procession drew an immense crowd, with nearly ten thousand people lining the route to the cemetery. King Faisal, deeply affected by the loss, was a close friend of Muhammad. After the funeral, King Faisal met with the bin Ladin family and informed the children that he was placing them under royal protection. He assured them that they would receive their fair share of the inheritance when they reached the age of 21. With the loss of Muhammad as their unifying figure, Muhammad's many wives, ex-wives, and children began to disperse to different parts of the kingdom, although they still maintained their family connection with the Saudi Binladin Group. Muhammad's eldest son, Salem bin Ladin, took over the family business and eventually expanded it into an international company.

== Legacy ==
Following Muhammad bin Ladin's death, his eldest sons, principally Salem bin Ladin, renamed the organization, "Binladen Brothers for Contracting and Industry" and continued to expand their late father's company until it employed more than 40,000 people. Salem bin Ladin died in the United States in 1988 when his ultralight aircraft collided with power lines. Many members of the bin Ladin family have moved away from Saudi Arabia and settled in Europe and the US.

In May 1990, the company was renamed the Saudi Binladin Group under the leadership of Bakr bin Laden. The Saudi Binladin Group as it is now known, is involved in construction, engineering, manufacturing, and telecommunications. Construction projects include airports, housing complexes, tunnels, and bridges. The group is also involved in city planning and real estate development. The Saudi Binladin Group is Egypt's largest private foreign company and negotiated with the Lebanese government to rebuild part of central Beirut under a US$50 million contract.

In 2009, the bin Ladin family was listed as the 5th wealthiest Saudi family by Forbes magazine, with a reported net worth of $7 billion.

Muhammad bin Ladin is portrayed by Tim Seyfi in the 2019 OCS/Netflix miniseries The Spy.

== Descendants ==
Muhammad bin Ladin's sons (both Ladin, Lādin and the more common Laden are valid transliterations for all the names):

1. Salem bin Ladin (1946–1988) married Caroline Carey
2. Ali bin Ladin
3. Thabet bin Ladin (d. 2009)
4. Mahrous bin Ladin
5. Hassan bin Ladin
6. Bakr bin Laden
7. Khalid bin Ladin
8. Yeslam bin Ladin (born 1950) married Carmen Dufour (born 1954)
  1. Wafah Dufour (born 1978)
  2. Najia Dufour (born 1979)
  3. Noor Dufour (born 1987)
9. Ghalib bin Ladin
10. Yahya bin Ladin
11. Abd al-Aziz bin Ladin
12. Isa bin Ladin
13. Tarek bin Ladin
14. Ahmed bin Ladin
15. Ibrahim bin Ladin
16. Shafiq bin Ladin
17. Osama bin Laden (1957–2011) married Najwa Ghanem (born 1960)
18. Khalil bin Ladin
19. Saleh bin Ladin
20. Haydar bin Ladin
21. Saad bin Ladin
22. Abdullah bin Ladin
23. Yasser bin Ladin
24. Muhammad bin Ladin (born 1967)
