= Saudi Binladin Group =

Multinational construction conglomerate

Saudi Binladin Group مجموعة بن لادن السعودية

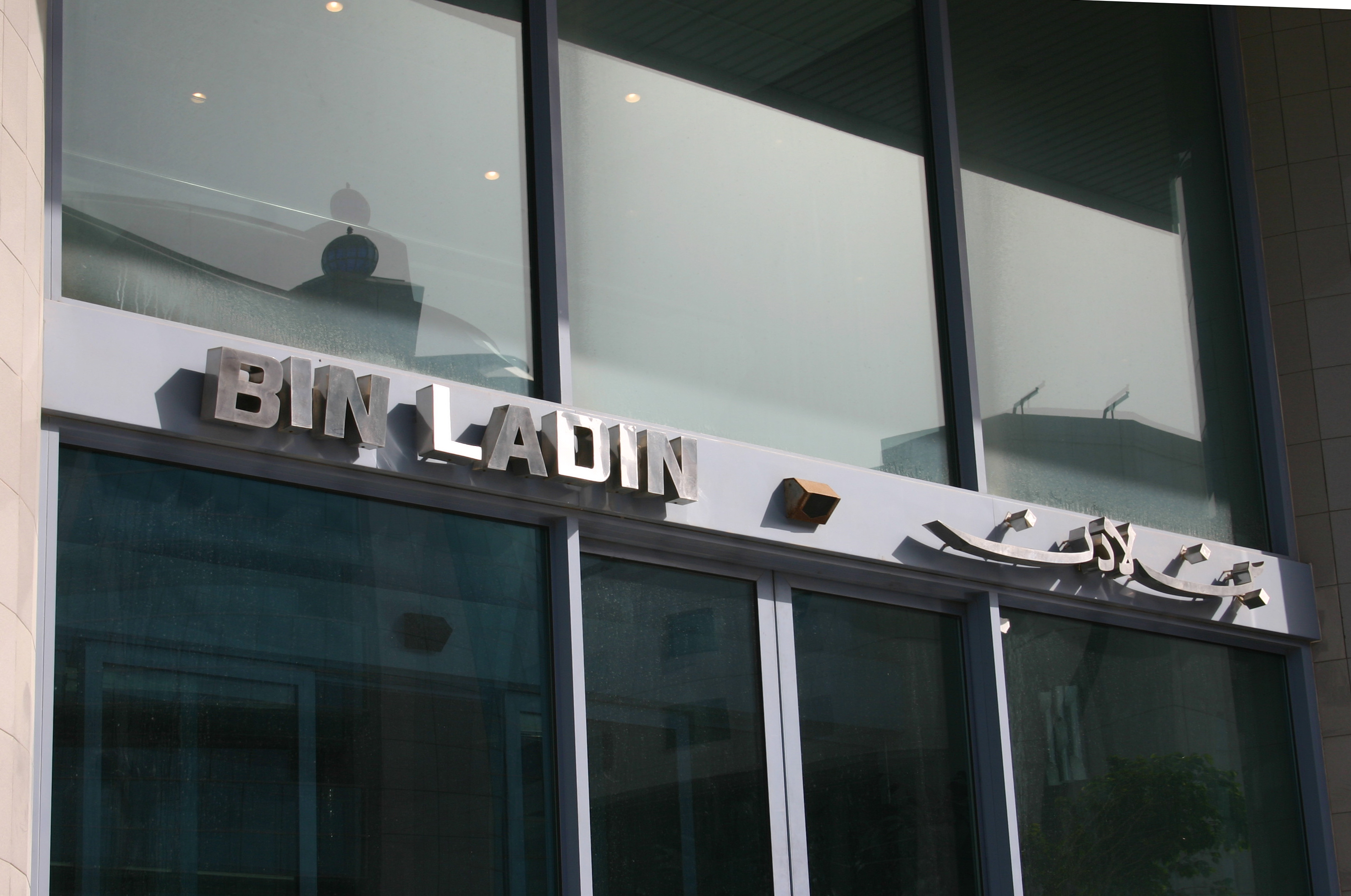
- Saudi Binladin group offices, Dubai, United Arab Emirates
- Type: Private conglomerate, holding company
- Industry: Construction
- Founded: 1931; 95 years ago
- Founder: Muhammad bin Ladin
- Headquarters: Jeddah, Saudi Arabia
- Key people: Muhannad Al-Azzawi Chairman
- Owner: Saudi Ministry of Finance (83.38% through Istidama Holding) Michiels S.A. (3% through conditional swap agreement with Istidama Holding) Bin Laden family (13.62% through the Binladin Company for Development and Commercial Investment)
- Website: www.sbg.com.sa

Saudi Binladin Group (SBG; Arabic: مجموعة بن لادن السعودية, romanized: Majmūʿat bin Lādin al-Suʿūdiyya), known as Binladin Group Global Holding Company since 2019, is a multinational construction conglomerate headquartered in Jeddah, Saudi Arabia. In 2011, the Saudi Binladin Group signed a US$1.23 billion contractual agreement to construct the tallest building in the world, Jeddah Tower in Jeddah. They are also party to a US$3.4 billion agreement to construct the Doha Metro located in Doha. The conglomerate comprises an estimated 537 companies. The group's founder was business magnate Muhammad bin Ladin, father of Osama bin Laden. As of December 2025, the Saudi Ministry of Finance holds a majority stake following a debt-to-equity conversion approved by shareholders.

== Overview ==
The SBG was founded in 1931 by Sheikh Muhammad bin Ladin, whose relationship with the country's founder, Abdulaziz Al Saud, led to important government contracts such as refurbishing the mosques at Mecca and Medina. In 1964, Muhammad bin Ladin was commissioned to reclad the Dome of the Rock in Jerusalem. After the death of Sheikh Mohammed in 1967, the group was headed by Mohammed Bahareth, brother of Mohammed's first wife and uncle of his oldest children. In 1972, Salem, the eldest son of Muhammad bin Ladin, took over as his father's successor with the assistance of several brothers. Upon Salem's death in a plane crash in 1988, the leadership of the group passed to one of Salem's brothers, Bakr, along with thirteen other brothers who make up the board of the bin Ladin group. The most important of these include Hasan bin Ladin, Yeslam bin Ladin and Yehia bin Ladin.

The Group considered an initial public offering in 2011, but declined to do so due to a combination of low oil prices, a weak stock market, and bureaucratic obstacles.

In April 2018, Bakr bin Laden, as well as his brothers Saleh and Saad, transferred their 36.2% stake in the Saudi Binladin Group to the Istidama Holding Company, which is owned by the Ministry of Finance. The government of Saudi Arabia subsequently established a five-person committee to run the Binladin Group, which includes of Abdul Rahman Al Harkan, Khaled Nahas, Khalid Al Khowaiter. Reuters described the ownership transfer as a functional nationalization, with al-Harkan, the committee's chairman, reporting to Finance Minister Mohammed Al-Jadaan. al-Karkan subsequently negotiated an 11 billion riyal loan from the Ministry of Finance.

In December 2025, shareholders approved converting debt owed to the Ministry of Finance into shares as part of a capital increase, raising the ministry's ownership to 86.38%.

== Current activities ==
The bin Ladin group is represented in most Saudi cities — Riyadh, Dammam — and in a number of major cities in the region (Beirut, Cairo, Amman, Dubai). According to a synopsis by the PBS news program Frontline:

- in Egypt, the SBG is headed by Omar bin Laden as Chairman, Khaled bin Laden as vice chairman, Tarek Helmy as CEO, and represents that country's largest foreign-owned private equity group, with over 40,000 employees.
- in Lebanon, the SBG, represented by Yehia bin Ladin, has been holding negotiations with the local authorities for a $50 million share in the project to rebuild the Beirut Central District within the framework of the Solidere Project and in conjunction with the al Baraka Group and the bin Mahfouz Group.
- in London, the SBG set up a representative firm called Binexport in November 1990.

The Group has constructed Abraj Al Bait Towers in Mecca and has been contracted by Kingdom Holding Company to build the Jeddah Tower.

On 11 September 2015, while doing construction work in the Grand Mosque in Mecca, Saudi Arabia, one of the Group's cranes collapsed due to high winds causing 118 deaths and almost 400 injuries. As a result, the Saudi king banned the firm from taking new projects while having its current projects reviewed. The Saudi government removed the ban on the Binladin Group in May 2016, allowing them to bid on new projects.

== Saudi Arabia projects ==
1. Royal Terminal, Jeddah
2. King Abdulaziz International Airport, New Haj Terminal, Jeddah
3. Al Faisaliyah Center
4. Madina-Qassim Expressway
5. Um Alqura University, Makkah
6. Lotus Compounds, Jeddah
7. Noura bint Abdul Rahman University
8. Abraj Al Bait Towers, Makkah
9. Jeddah Tower, Jeddah
10. King Abdullah Economic City
11. Jamaraat Bridge
12. Saudi Arabia National Guard Housing Project
13. King Abdullah Financial District, Riyadh
14. Saudi Arabian Railways Projects CTW-100 and CTW 110
15. Al Masjid Al-Haram expansion

== International projects ==
1. Blaise Diagne International Airport, Senegal
2. Sharjah International Airport Expansion & Development, UAE
3. University of Sharjah, UAE
4. Expansion of Velana International Airport, Maldives
5. Kuala Lumpur International Airport, Malaysia

== Website ==
SBG's Internet domain name, saudi-binladin-group.com, was registered on September 11, 2000, for one year, expiring on the same day as the September 11 attacks. The domain was later acquired by a domain speculator.
