= 2008 Manhattan crane collapse =

Tower crane collapse in New York City, U.S.

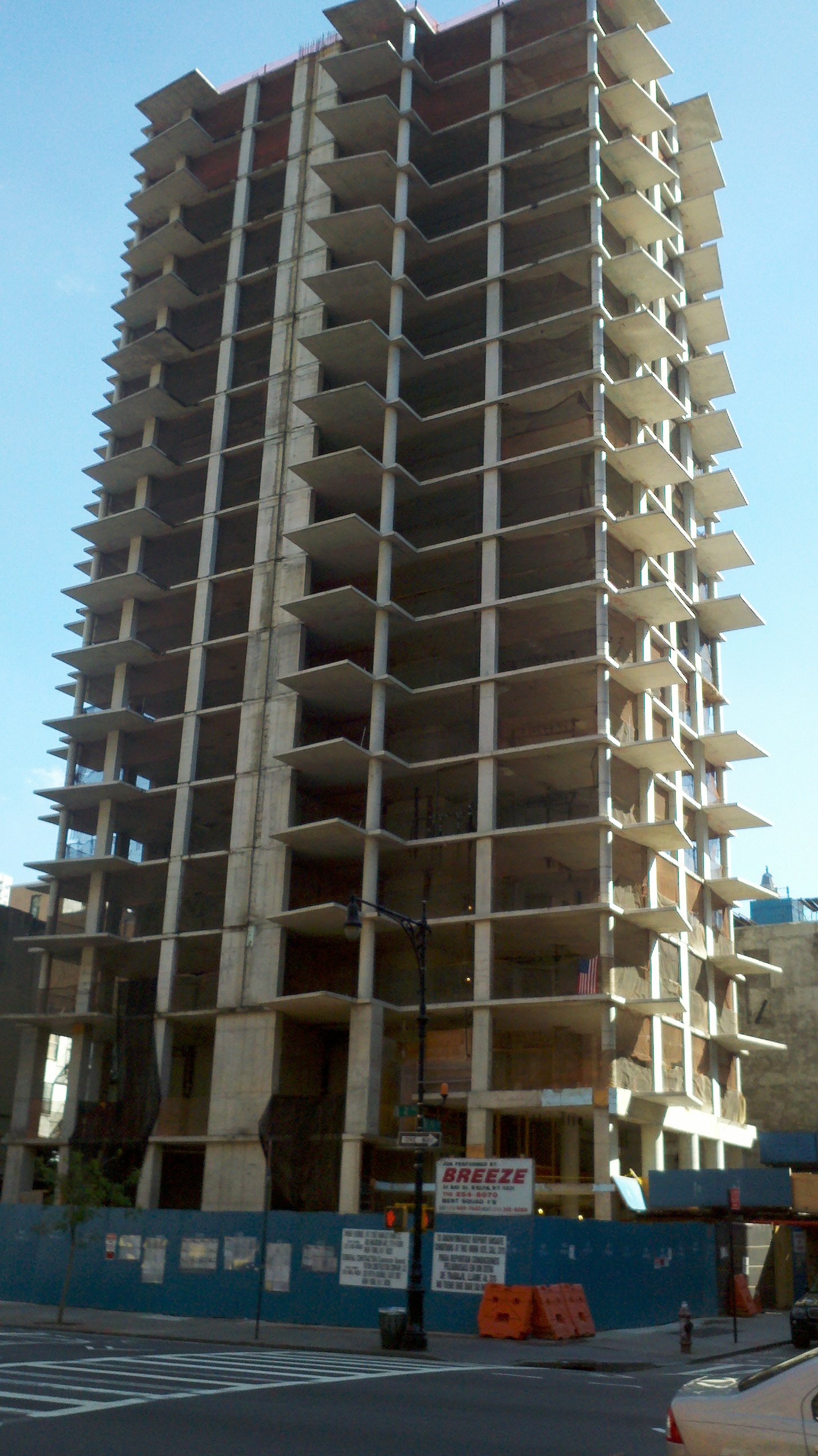
- 303 East 51st Street skyscraper

Details
- Date: March 15, 2008; 14:30
- Location: East 51st Street and Second Avenue, Manhattan, New York City, United States
- Coordinates: 40°45′25″N 73°58′06″W
- Country: United States
- Line: Construction site (303 East 51st Street residential tower)
- Operator: New York Crane & Equipment
- Incident type: Tower crane collapse
- Cause: Failure of stabilizing collar during crane jumping operation

Statistics
- Vehicles: 1 crane
- Deaths: 7
- Injured: 24
- Damage: Crane collapse onto construction site and nearby building

On 15 March 2008, a crane collapsed during construction of the 303 East 51st Street skyscraper in New York City.

== History ==
On 15 March 2008, a crane owned by New York Crane & Equipment collapsed during construction. It was a luffing-jib tower crane manufactured by Favco that was 200 feet (61 m) tall at the time of the collapse. The accident happened while workers were installing a new steel collar to secure the crane to the building at the 18th floor during an operation to raise its height.

Seven people were killed and 24 others were injured. The accidents drew significant public attention due to the scale of damage in densely populated residential areas. They triggered emergency investigations and led to stricter construction crane safety regulations and enforcement measures in New York City.

== Impact ==
Two months later, on 30 May 2008, another crane collapsed on 91st Street in New York City, killing two workers.

Both crane collapses, occurred in New York City in 2008, prompted a comprehensive overhaul of the city's crane safety regulations, including new inspection requirements, stricter permitting procedures, and enhanced oversight of tower crane operations.

== See also ==
- 303 East 51st Street
- Big Blue crane collapse
- Mecca crane collapse
- Seattle crane collapse
- 2023 Taichung crane collapse
