= Mecca crane collapse =

2015 structural failure in Mecca, Saudi Arabia

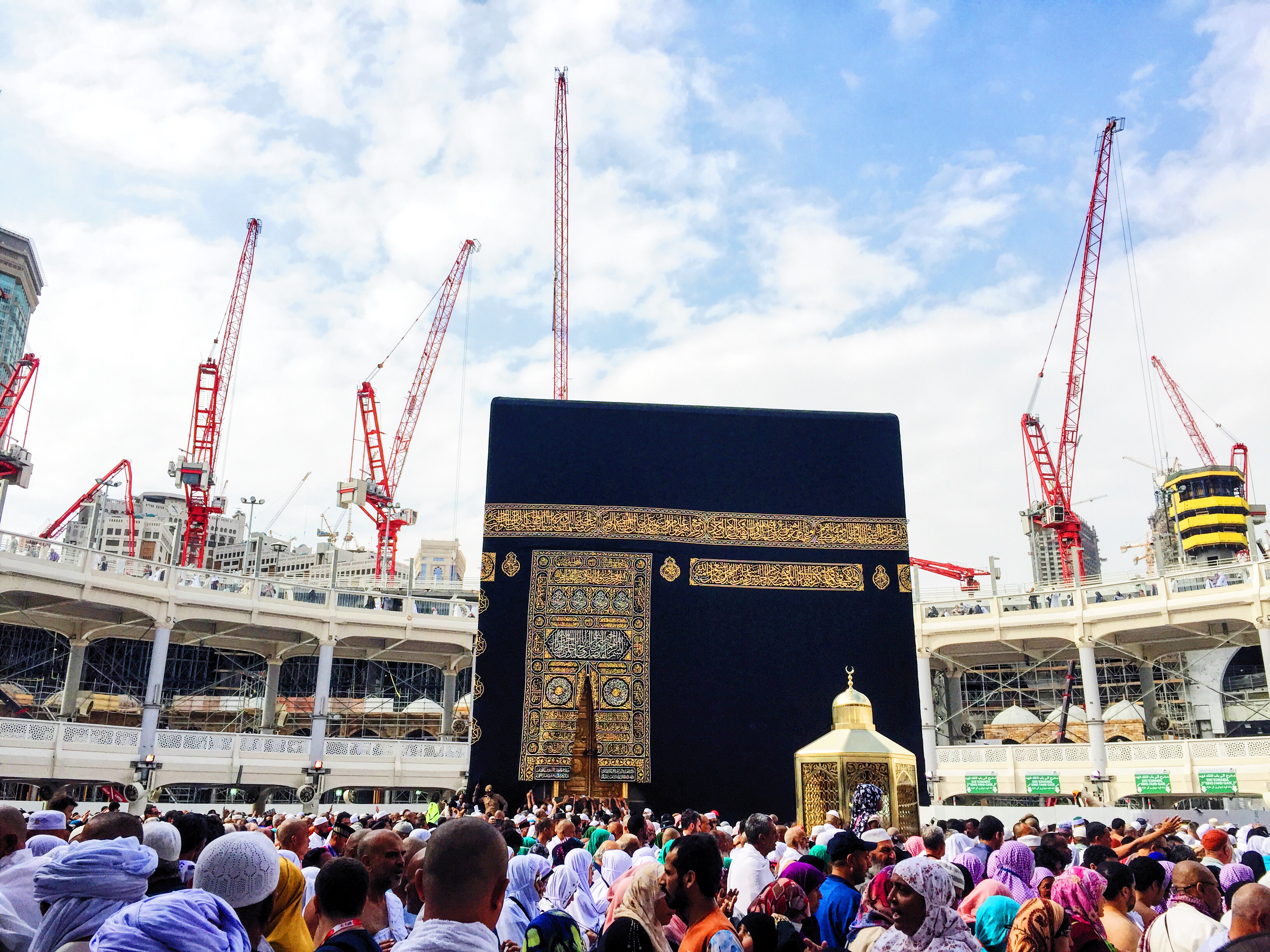
- Masjid al-Haram with cranes similar to the one involved in the accident
- Date: 11 September 2015; 11 years ago
- Time: ~17:10 AST
- Location: Masjid al-Haram, Mecca, Saudi Arabia; 21.4225°N 39.8262°E
- Cause: Crane collapse
- Deaths: 111
- Injuries: 394

A crawler crane collapsed over the Masjid al-Haram in Mecca, Saudi Arabia, around 5:10 p.m. on 11 September 2015, killing 111 people and injuring 394 others. The city was preparing for the Hajj pilgrimage. The collapse has been cited as the deadliest crane collapse in history, with the previous most deadly incident being the collapse of a construction crane in New York City in 2008, killing seven people.

Following the collapse, the King of Saudi Arabia, Salman ibn Abdulaziz Al Saud, ordered a halt to the awarding of contracts to the Saudi Binladin Group, the primary contractor of construction works in the holy city. The incident was found to have resulted from a combination of human error and strong winds.

Deutsche Welle cited that in August 2016, Saudi Gazette reported the trial of 14 individuals, with Okaz adding that prosecutors did not file charges against 42 others who were under investigation, including 16 members of the Bin Laden family. Victims of the collapse were of twelve nationalities, with the greatest contingents of deaths being 25 Bangladeshis and 23 Egyptians. Of the injured, the most represented nationalities were 51 Pakistanis and 42 Indonesians.

== Crane collapse and casualties ==
Victims by nationality
Nationality	Killed	Injured	Ref.
Bangladesh	25		
Egypt	23		
Pakistan	15	51	
Indonesia	11	42	
Iran	11	32	
India	11	15	
Turkey	8	21	
Malaysia	6	10	
Nigeria	6		
United Kingdom	2	3	
Algeria	1		
Afghanistan	1		
Total	111 (Note: The total of all deaths reported by nation (120) does not add up total deaths reported by most up-to-date sources (111). Some of those killed may have held multiple citizenship or some references may be incorrect.)	394	

The Saudi Civil Defence Authority confirmed that a crane collapsed through the ceiling of the mosque during strong winds created by a powerful storm. The collapse killed at least 111 people, and injured 394 others, trapping many in the debris created by the collapse. The incident reportedly occurred shortly before 5:10 p.m. on Friday. The crane fell into the east side of the mosque, with its boom crashing through the roofs of the eastern piazza. One witness reported that the crane fell on the third floor of the Mas'aa (space between Safa and Marwa) at 5:45 p.m. local time.

== Aftermath ==
=== Factors leading to the collapse ===
There were strong sand storms in the region over the preceding week. The Saudi Civil Defence Authority said in a statement that an hour before the disaster, Mecca was experiencing medium to heavy rain. There were also reports of winds of more than 40 kilometres per hour (25 mph). However, the exact cause of the crane collapse was not confirmed.

Crawler crane LR 11350, manufactured by the German-based Liebherr Group involved in the incident was operated by the Saudi Binladin Group, who are the main organization managing the expansion of the Great Mosque and also responsible for a large amount of major building contracts in Mecca and around Saudi Arabia. A report by Liebherr later stated that the boom of the crane was not sufficiently secured by Binladin to sustain the high winds on the day of the collapse.

The Saudi Gazette reported that Khalid bin Faisal, Emir (Governor) of Mecca, had ordered the Binladin Group to relocate cranes from pedestrian areas and to deploy safeguards to prevent pilgrims entering the construction zone, eleven days before the collapse.

=== Investigation ===
Following the collapse, the governor of Mecca, Prince Khalid bin Faisal, ordered an investigation into the incident. Search and rescue teams, along with medical workers from the Saudi Red Crescent Authority, were sent to the site. After visiting the site two days later, King Salman vowed that the collapse will be investigated and the results of the investigation will be made public. Pictures and video circulating on social media showed many dead and wounded amidst severe damage to the building.

After receiving the report on the investigation into the incident, King Salman ordered on 15 September that top officials of the Saudi Binladin Group be banned from traveling outside the kingdom and that the group also be suspended from taking new projects. The report pinned the blame for the collapse partially on the construction company. A royal court announcement carried by the Saudi Press Agency (SPA) said the king was reviewing the report of the Accident Investigation Committee, which suggested negligence on the part of the Saudi Binladin Group, but concluded that it found an "absence of criminal suspicion". The report said "the main reason for the accident is the strong winds while the crane was in a wrong position".

An engineer for the Saudi Binladin Group said that the crane was erected in "an extremely professional way", and the accident was an "act of God". The Liebherr Group responded to the collapse by sending local engineers and engineers from their crane manufacturing plant in Ehingen, Germany to help in the investigation of the collapse and to assist on site. Liebherr Group experts who participated in the investigation of the collapse found no structural flaws in the crane. Their report stated that the crane's 190-meter (620 ft) long boom was not sufficiently secured by its operators so as to withstand the high winds present on the day of the collapse and that use of that crane in those 80–105 kilometres per hour (50–65 mph) winds was well outside the manufacturer's recommended operating parameters.

There have been many major incidents during the Hajj over the years, causing the loss of thousands of lives. To prevent crushes and accommodate more pilgrims each year during the Hajj season, Saudi authorities undertook a major construction project to expand the mosque compound in recent years. At the time of the incident the Saudi authorities were preparing for the hundreds of thousands of people expected to arrive in the city for the Hajj due to begin on 22 September 2015.

A source within the mosque's engineering department stated that the crane was removed from the mosque and will not be reconstructed. The source said that, in coordination with the Civil Defence, all of the more than 100 other cranes still present near the mosque were inspected and found to be safe.

=== Compensation for victims ===
King Salman ordered 1,000,000 Saudi riyal (US$266,000) be distributed as compensation to the families of those who died in the crane collapse, and that two relatives of each of the deceased were to be the King's guests for Hajj in 2016, adding that a further 1,000,000 riyal would be paid to the victims of the collapse who had sustained a permanent disability, and 500,000 riyal (US$133,000) would be paid to the victims without lasting injuries. King Salman also decreed that these compensation payments will not prevent private legal claims by the injured and families of the deceased.

=== Trial ===
In August 2016, Saudi Gazette reported the trial of 14 individuals, with Okaz adding that prosecutors did not file charges against 42 others who were under investigation, including 16 members of the Bin Laden family, according to Deutsche Welle.

A mere 13 days after the collapse, on 24 September 2015, during one of the busiest days of the Hajj pilgrimage, a crush at Mina in the outskirts of Mecca killed more than 2,000 other pilgrims, injuring an equal number. More than 400 others were deemed missing.

== Reactions ==
Irfan al-Alawi, co-founder of the Islamic Heritage Research Foundation, criticised the Saudi authorities, believing that their redevelopment of holy sites was not only damaging history, but putting many pilgrims' lives at risk.

Saudi Hajj minister, Bandar Al Hajjar, (Note: Al Hajjar was removed from his position on 27 September 2015 in the aftermath of the 2015 Mina stampede.) stated that the Hajj that year would be the last to be affected by reductions in pilgrim quotas due to construction work and is quoted to have said that, "Starting from next Hajj season, the number of pilgrims will increase to 5 million and then to 30 million in the coming five years".

Iranian President Hassan Rouhani offered medical staff to assist with casualties. Pakistan Foreign Office spokesman said that a Pakistani medical team engaged in providing medical treatment to the injured.

Other leaders around the world offered condolences. Sheikh Mohammed bin Zayed Al Nahyan, Crown Prince of Abu Dhabi prayed for "Allah Almighty to grant the souls of the deceased rest in peace and forgiveness and to grant the injured a speedy recovery." Canadian Foreign Affairs Minister Rob Nicholson stated that he was "deeply saddened" and offered "condolences to the families and friends of the victims". Indian Prime Minister Narendra Modi said that his "thoughts and prayers are with the families of those who lost their lives in the crane crash in Mecca" and wished a "quick recovery" for the injured. Nigerian President Muhammadu Buhari urged "all Nigerians to pray for the continued safety of their compatriots who are currently in Saudi Arabia for this year's Hajj". Singapore's President Tony Tan extended his "deepest and heartfelt condolences" to the King and people of Saudi Arabia, and stated that "our thoughts and prayers are with the victims’ families during this difficult time".

South African President Jacob Zuma and Russian President Vladimir Putin both offered their condolences. Patriarch Kirill of Moscow wrote that "it was with heartache that I heard the news that hundreds of people who were on a pilgrimage to Mecca were killed and injured". United Kingdom Prime Minister David Cameron wrote on Twitter that his "thoughts and prayers are with those who have lost loved ones at Mecca today". United States Secretary of State John Kerry issued a statement that the United States stood with Saudi Arabia and "all Muslims around the world in the aftermath of this dreadful incident at one of Islam's holiest sites".

== See also ==
- 1979 Grand Mosque seizure
- 2006 Mecca hostel collapse
- 2015 Mina crowd crush
- 2008 Manhattan crane collapse
- Big Blue crane collapse
- Seattle crane collapse
- 2023 Taichung crane collapse
