= Big Blue crane collapse =

1999 heavy lift crane failure in Wisconsin, US

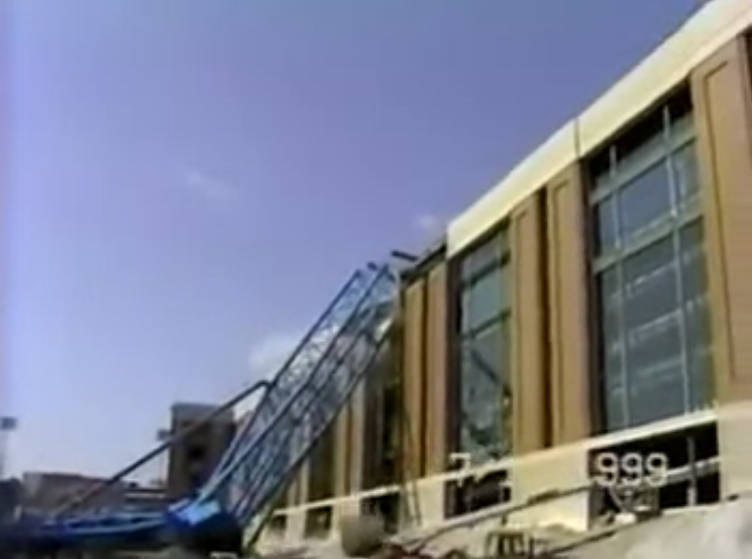
- Aftermath of the collapse
- Date: July 14, 1999
- Time: 5:12 PM
- Venue: Miller Park
- Location: Milwaukee, Wisconsin; 43°01′39.7″N 87°58′20.6″W
- Type: Crane collapse
- Cause: Crane was operated outside of design specifications for the combination of load and wind.
- Deaths: 3
- Injuries: 5

On July 14, 1999, a Lampson LTL-1500 Transi-Lift heavy lift crawler crane known as Big Blue collapsed in Milwaukee, Wisconsin while working on the Miller Park venue. The collapse resulted in the deaths of three iron workers, and the injury of five others.

== Background ==
Big Blue was a Lampson LTL-1500 Transi-Lift heavy lift crawler crane used for the construction of the retractable roof of the Miller Park baseball stadium in Milwaukee, Wisconsin. The building began construction in 1996 and was originally meant to be completed by 2000. The stadium was to become the home of the Milwaukee Brewers. Contractors and subcontractors on the project included Mitsubishi Heavy Industries of America, who designed and installed the roof, Lampson International, which owned the crane, and Danny's Construction Company, which erected the steel structure.

== Accident ==
OSHA footage of the collapse

On July 14, 1999, at approximately 5:12 pm, the Big Blue collapsed during the construction of the Miller Park (now American Family Field) baseball stadium in Milwaukee, Wisconsin, with a load of over 450 tonnes (440 long tons; 500 short tons) on the hook. Three Iron Workers Local 8 members—Jeffrey Wischer, William DeGrave, and Jerome Starr—were killed when the suspended personnel platform in which they were observing the lift was hit by the falling crane. A safety inspector was filming construction of the stadium on that day and captured the collapse on video as it occurred.

== Causes ==
Following an investigation by the Occupational Safety and Health Administration, it was determined that the crane was outside of the design specifications required for both load and wind. MHIA calculated the effects of side winds on the crane itself. However, it failed to calculate the load. Additionally, the king pin was discovered to not have been installed nor maintained properly. Lack of coordination between contractors was also blamed for the incident.

== Aftermath and Memorial ==
Three firms were fined a total of over US$500,000 as a result of the collapse. The jurors awarded $1.4 million to each of the widows for pain and suffering, as well as $350,000 apiece for loss of companionship. In addition, Mitsubishi was ordered to pay punitive damages to the three women in the amount of $94 million.

The widows of the workers—Marjorie DeGrave, Ramona Dulde-Starr, and Patricia Wischer—settled a lawsuit against Mitsubishi Heavy Industries of America, the company responsible for constructing the retractable roof of the stadium, for an undisclosed total of over $99 million.

Teamwork, a bronze sculpture by Omri Amrany, was installed at Miller Park in 2001 to honor the three workers. The Brewers postponed their home game against the Kansas City Royals scheduled for the day after the accident out of respect for the victims and wore an Ironworkers Local 8 memorial patch on the left breast of their jerseys following the accident for the remainder of the 1999 season. Work on Miller Park was later completed with a new crane, a red and white Van Seumeren Demag CC-12600. The accident delayed the planned opening of Miller Park in 2000 until 2001.

== See also ==
- 2008 Manhattan crane collapse
- Mecca crane collapse
- Seattle crane collapse
- 2023 Taichung crane collapse
