= Selig Monument =

Artwork by Brian Maughan

Coordinates: 43°01′45.6″N 87°58′18.7″W

- Artist: Brian Maughan
- Year: 2010
- Type: bronze
- Dimensions: 210 cm (84 in)
- Location: Miller Park, Milwaukee, Wisconsin

The Selig Monument is a public art work by artist Brian Maughan. It is located in front of the Miller Park stadium west of downtown Milwaukee, Wisconsin. The sculpture depicts Bud Selig, the former Commissioner of Baseball and former owner of the Milwaukee Brewers baseball team. It was dedicated on August 24, 2010.
