= Teamwork (sculpture) =

Public sculpture by Omri Amrany in Milwaukee, WI, US

- Teamwork in 2012
- Artist: Omri Amrany
- Year: 2001
- Type: Bronze
- Dimensions: 380 cm (148 in)
- Location: Milwaukee, Wisconsin; 43.02944°N 87.97283°W
- Owner: American Family Field

Teamwork is a public sculpture by Omri Amrany located at American Family Field west of downtown Milwaukee, Wisconsin. It is cast in bronze and honors Jeffrey Wischer, William DeGrave, and Jerome Starr, the three Iron Workers Local 8 members killed by the Big Blue Crane collapse during the construction of the baseball stadium in 1999. The sculpture was commissioned by the Habush, Habush and Rottier Charitable Foundation for $250,000.

== Description ==
Teamwork depicts three Milwaukee Local Union 8 Ironworkers dressed for construction work. All wear jeans, t-shirts, boots and hardhats. One holds a clipboard.

== Information ==
The sculpture honors William DeGrave, Jerome Starr and Jeffrey Wischer, three ironworkers who were killed by a piece of the stadium's retractable roof that fell when a heavy lift crawler crane failed during the construction of Miller Park (now American Family Field) in July 1999. The widows of the workers, Marjorie DeGrave, Ramona Dulde-Starr and Patricia Wischer, settled a lawsuit against crane-maker Mitsubishi Heavy Industries of America, for an undisclosed total of over $99 million. Attorney Robert L. Habush represented two of the widows in their suit.
