= Seattle crane collapse =

Construction accident in Seattle, Washington

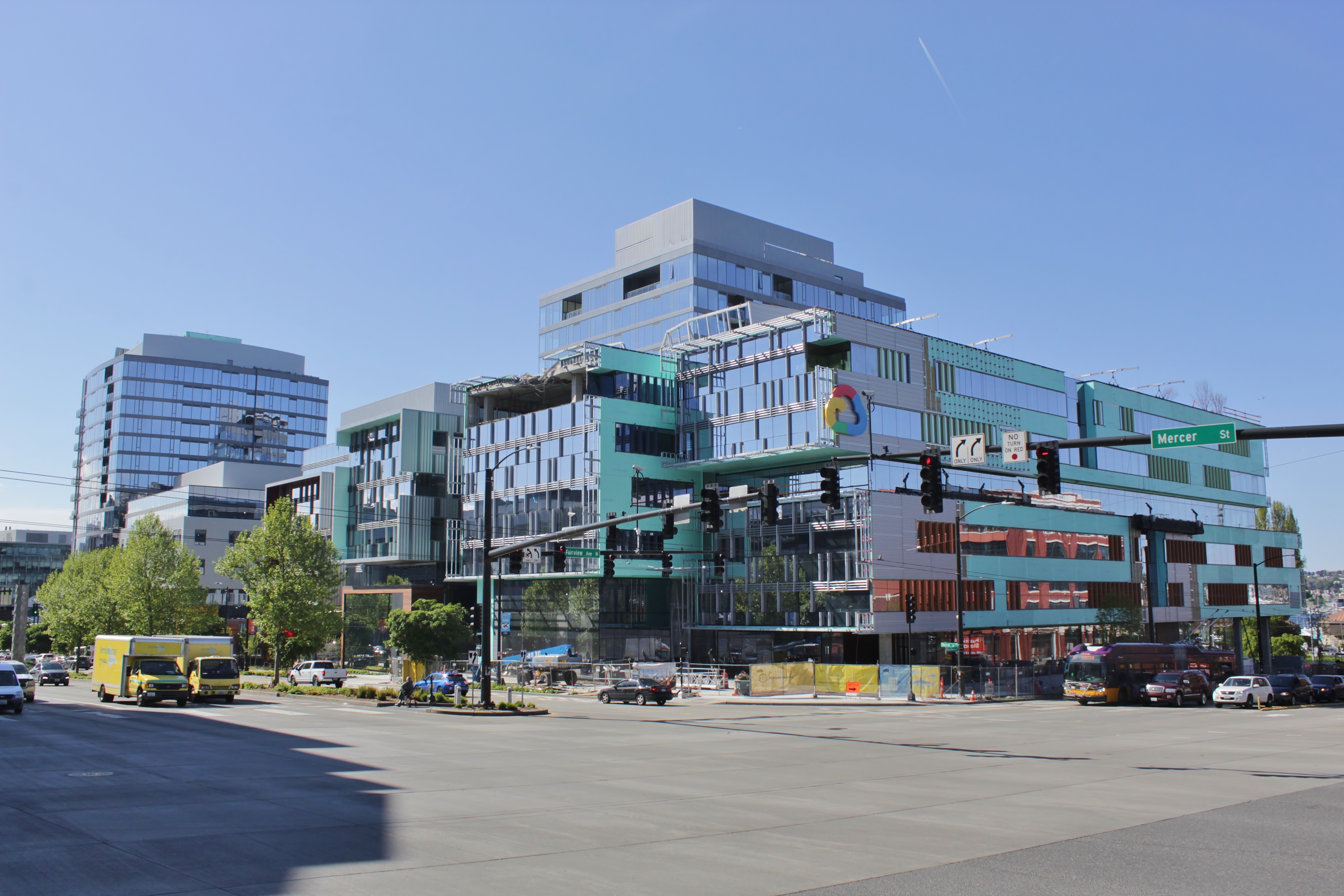
- Site of the collapse, seen two days later
- Date: April 27, 2019
- Time: 3:28 p.m.
- Location: Mercer Street and Fairview Avenue, Seattle, Washington, United States; 47°37′29″N 122°20′06″W
- Type: Crane collapse
- Deaths: 4
- Injuries: 4

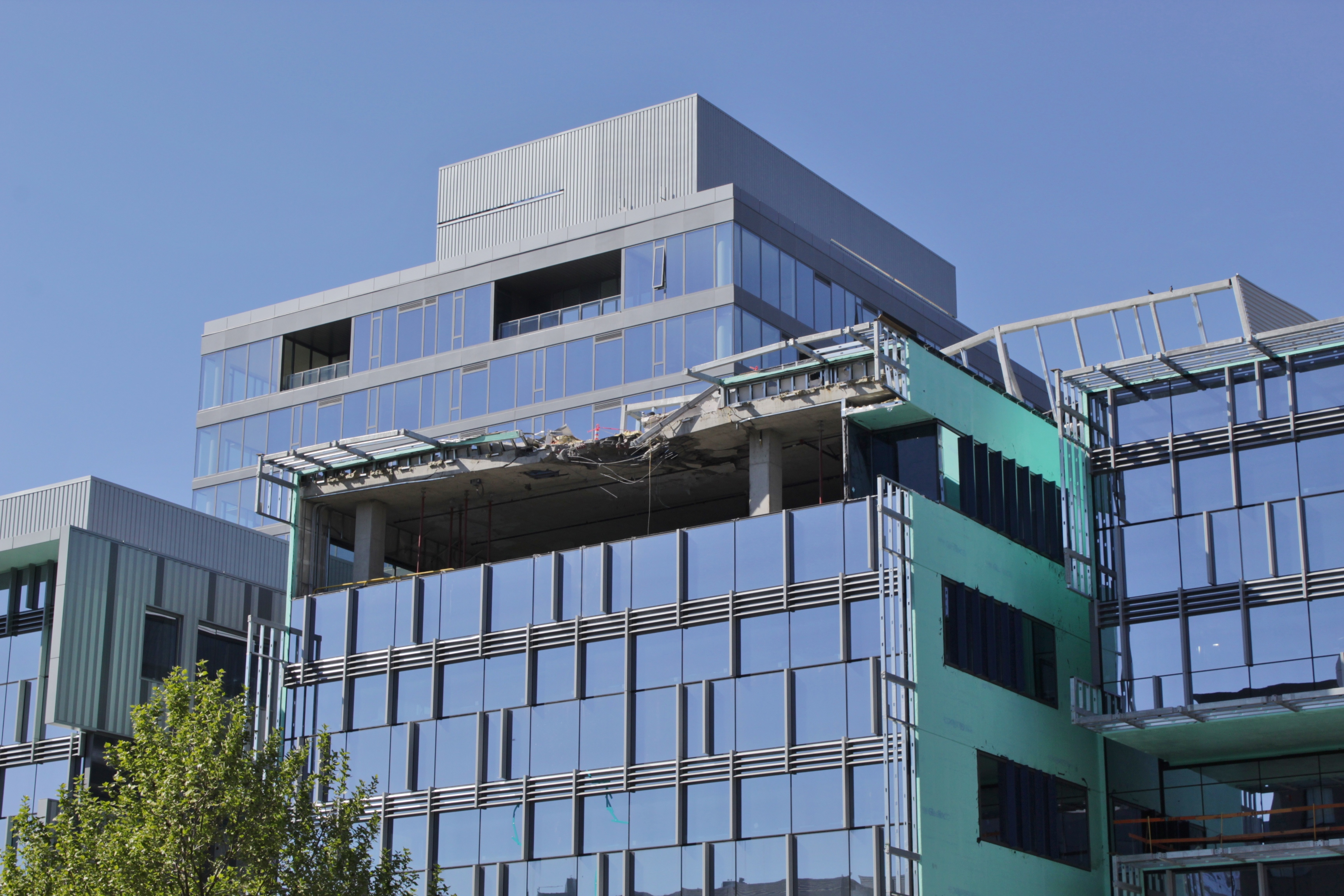
Damage to the building following the collapse

On April 27, 2019, at approximately 3:28 p.m. Pacific Time, a construction crane working on a Google office building in Seattle, Washington, United States, collapsed onto Mercer Street, killing four people and injuring four others. The crane, which was being dismantled, fell across the street and its median, crushing six cars near the Fairview Avenue intersection. It also damaged the building's roof and eastern facade. Two of the four victims were ironworkers, while the others, a college student and a former city administrator, were in vehicles on the street.

== History ==
Several strong gusts of wind were reported in the area, including one recorded at a speed of 23 miles per hour (37 km/h) at the time of the collapse. Wind speed was briefly theorized as a factor in the collapse. The incident was captured in a dashcam video that was posted online the day after the accident, showing the perspective from westbound Mercer Street.

Seattle has undergone a construction boom since the Great Recession, tallying 60 cranes in early 2019—the most in one city in the United States at the time. The last local crane incident to include fatalities occurred in November 2006 during construction of the Expedia Building in Bellevue, which killed one person in a nearby building. As a result, Washington adopted laws to enforce stricter crane safety policies, including enhanced operator certification and training.

The Washington State Department of Labor and Industries began an investigation into the incident, with cooperation from developer Vulcan, Inc., the City of Seattle, and general contractor GLY Construction. The collapse's cause was initially unknown, although outside investigators had speculated that the improper removal of pins and bolts during disassembly was a potential cause. Mercer Street remained shut down for the weekend and re-opened on Monday morning, following removal of the crane and debris to a nearby lot. In 2025 the Department of Labor & Industries filed rules that will require prime contractors to follow strict guidelines when operating, assembling, dismantling, or reconfiguring tower cranes on construction sites.

== Investigations ==
The preliminary findings from the Department of Labor and Industries was released in October and found that the collapse was caused by the premature removal of more than 50 pins between the tower crane sections. State officials indicated they don't have a way to compel companies to abandon this practice – which can speed up disassembly but jeopardizes a crane's stability – and they are considering new regulations. The Department of Labor and Industries fined general contractor GLY Construction and Northwest Tower Crane Service, responsible for dismantling the crane $25,200 and $12,000 respectively. Morrow Equipment, which supplied the crane, was cited for a "willful" serious violation which "directly contributed to the collapse" and fined $70,000. The Seattle Police Department is conducting a criminal investigation into the accident. Morrow was cited, because it had approved the removal of pins against recommended practices.

== Settlement ==
In 2022, $150,000,000 was awarded to the families of the deceased, and two people injured in the accident, as a result of two lawsuits.

== See also ==
- 2008 Manhattan crane collapse
- Big Blue crane collapse
- Mecca crane collapse
- 2023 Taichung crane collapse
