= American Family Field =

Baseball stadium in Milwaukee, Wisconsin, U.S.

- Western aerial view of the Park in October, 2026

- Location within the United States Location within Wisconsin
- Former names: Miller Park (2001–2020)
- Address: 1 Brewers Way
- Location: Milwaukee, Wisconsin, U.S.
- Coordinates: 43°1′42″N 87°58′16″W
- Elevation: 635 feet (194 m) AMSL
- Owner: Wisconsin Professional Baseball Park District
- Capacity: 41,900
- Roof: Retractable
- Surface: Kentucky bluegrass
- Scoreboard: 12,077 square feet (1,122 m^{2}); 8mm LED digital display
- Record attendance: 46,641 (Concert; George Strait; June 3, 2023) baseball: 46,218 (September 6, 2003, Cubs vs Brewers)
- Field size: Left Field – 342 feet (104 m) (2021 posted 342, original 344 feet); Left-Center – 371 feet (113 m) (not posted); Center Field – 400 feet (122 m); Right-Center – 374 feet (114 m) (not posted); Right Field – 337 feet (103 m) (345 posted); Backstop – 56 feet (17 m)

Construction
- Groundbreaking: November 9, 1996
- Built: 1996–2001
- Opened: April 6, 2001; 25 years ago
- Cost: $400 million ($727 million in 2025 dollars)
- Architects: HKS, Inc. NBBJ; Eppstein Uhen Architects
- Project managers: International Facilities Group, LLC.
- Structural engineer: Arup/Flad Structural Engineers
- Services engineers: Arup/Kapur & Associates
- General contractors: HCH Miller Park Joint Venture (Hunt Construction; Clark Construction; Hunzinger Co.)

Tenant
- Milwaukee Brewers (MLB) 2001–present

Website
- mlb.com/brewers/ballpark

American Family Field (formerly known and still often referred to as Miller Park) is a retractable roof stadium in Milwaukee, Wisconsin. Located southwest of the intersection of Interstate 94 and Brewers Boulevard, it is the ballpark of Major League Baseball's Milwaukee Brewers. It opened in 2001 under the name Miller Park as a replacement for Milwaukee County Stadium.

American Family Field features North America's only fan-shaped convertible roof, which can open and close in less than 10 minutes. Large panes of glass allow natural grass to grow, augmented with heat lamp structures wheeled out across the field during the off-season.

The stadium opened in 2001 at a cost of $392 million. Between 1996 and 2020, taxpayers paid $609 million for the construction costs through higher sales taxes. In 2023, Wisconsin lawmakers entered into an agreement with the Milwaukee Brewers to spend nearly $500 million of public funds on stadium renovations.

== History ==
American Family Field was one of the largest construction projects in Wisconsin history. It was built with US$290 million of public funds from a 0.1% sales tax that began January 1, 1996, and ended on March 31, 2020. The tax was applied on purchases in Milwaukee County and four surrounding counties: Ozaukee, Racine, Washington, and Waukesha. The tax was controversial, in part because of the notion of using public funds for a privately owned sports team. The state senator who cast the deciding vote in the funding bill, George Petak of Racine, lost a recall election based on his vote for the stadium.

On November 9, 1996, groundbreaking took place in a parking lot behind County Stadium. Originally scheduled to open in 2000, American Family Field's construction was delayed after three construction workers were killed in an accident on July 14, 1999. A Lampson Transi-lift crane (nicknamed "Big Blue") brought in to build the roof collapsed while lifting a 450-ton roof section during windy conditions. A camera crew was filming construction of the stadium on that day and captured the collapse on video as it occurred. Repair work and an investigation forced the Brewers to stay in County Stadium for one more year, until 2001. There was some talk of having the Brewers move to the new venue in the middle of 2000, but it was determined that too many issues would need to be resolved for it to be a realistic possibility.

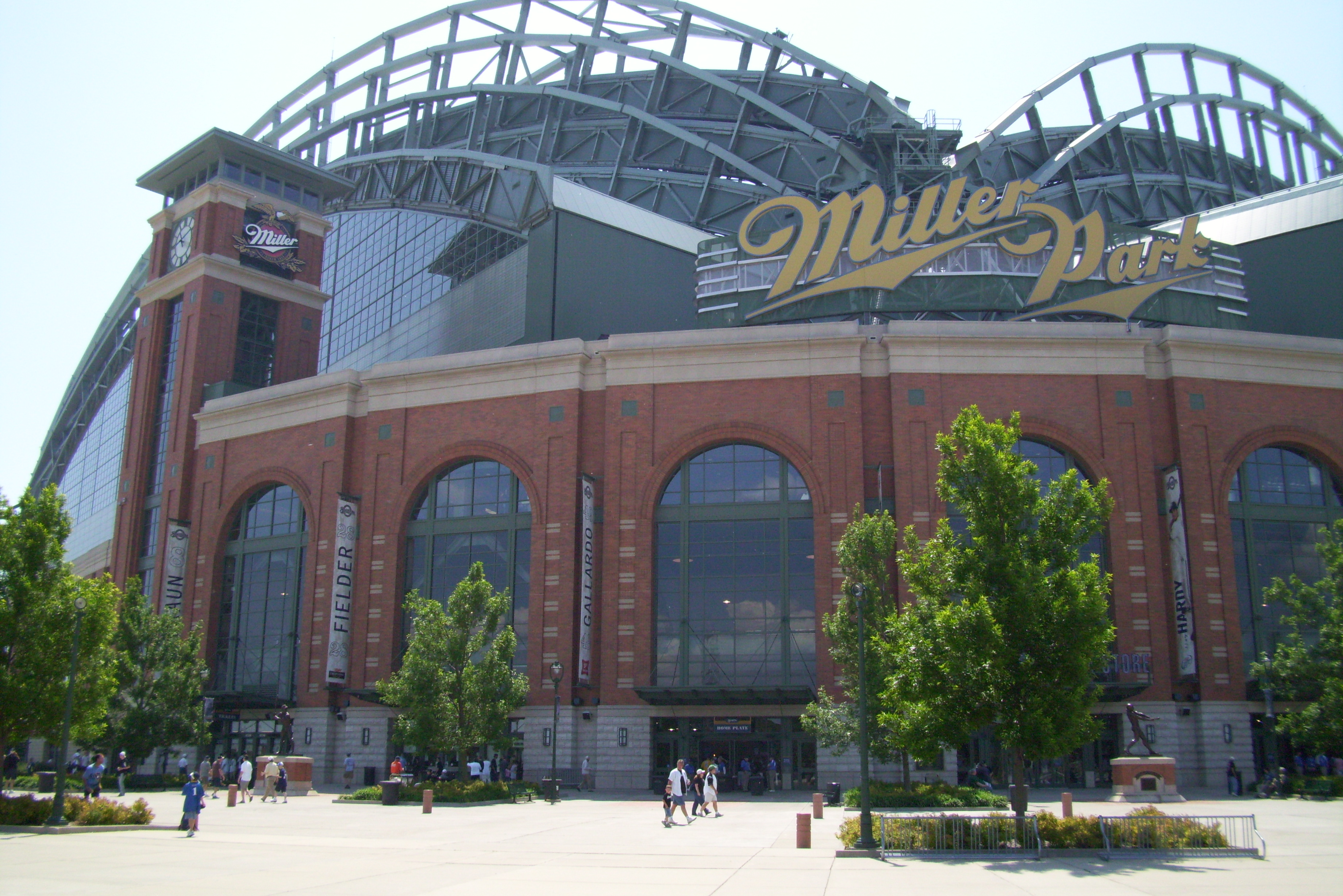
Entrance with the original Miller Park sign in 2009

It was originally named Miller Park as part of a $40 million naming rights deal with Miller Brewing Company which expired at the end of 2020. Madison-based American Family Insurance purchased the naming rights in a new 15-year deal.

=== Structural challenges ===
The unconventional fan-shaped retractable roof has not been without complications. Major elements of the pivot system behind home plate and the outfield roof track have been replaced, even after the crane incident.

At the end of the 2006 season, the roof's bogie system was replaced at a cost of more than $13 million. The 10 new, 24-foot-long (7.3 m), 60 horsepower (45 kW) bogies were paid for with money from the settlement between the stadium district and Mitsubishi Heavy Industries of America. Six of the bogies weigh 66 short tons (59 long tons; 60 t), while the four others weigh 49 short tons (44 long tons; 44 t). The work was completed by lifting sections of the roof approximately 6 inches (15 cm) with Enerpac hydraulic lifts, while a 300-short-ton (270-long-ton; 270 t) crane replaced the bogies individually. "The bogies will last for the life of the facility," said Mike Duckett, executive director of the then named Miller Park stadium district. The project was completed by the start of the 2007 season.

=== Additions ===
In time for the 2006 season there were three additions to the stadium. Two sets of LED scoreboards were added. One replaced the formerly manually operated "out of town" scoreboards along the left and right field walls with a new set of LED scoreboards along the left-field wall. The new "out of town" scoreboards show the score of every Major League game on that day. A second-tier marquee scoreboard was also added along the bottom of the 300-level of the stadium stretching from foul pole to home plate to foul pole, with the portion closest to the foul lines used to provide open captions of announcements from the public address system and advertisements. The section of the second-tier scoreboard above home plate displays statistics for those unable to see the main scoreboard above the center-field wall. The final addition to American Family Field for the 2006 season was the addition of a field-level picnic area in the corner of right-field. The picnic area has a capacity of 75 and provides a place for fans to watch the game in a leisurely setting and be within feet of the right-fielder. Known first as the Mercedes-Benz Field Haus, the picnic area's name was changed to AirTran Airways Landing Zone in 2009, and to the ATI Club in 2012. In 2017, due to a contract dispute between ATI and the Brewers, it was apparently billed as the Right Field Patio until gaining its sponsorship as the Aurora Health Care Bullpen in 2018.

In 2009, American Family Field's outfield was replaced with "Lo-Mo" Kentucky bluegrass just like the infield was the prior year. The new turf, common in other ballparks around baseball, is denser and has a sand base, instead of the sand and clay mix under the original grass. The turf yields truer hops and fewer instances in which the baseball skips under an outfielder's glove than the previous turf.

During the off-season between 2010 and 2011, the stadium's original centerfield scoreboard (a smaller videoboard atop a larger black and amber message display board) was replaced by a full-length and full color Daktronics 1080p HD display board which was the ninth-largest screen among MLB stadiums as of 2012, along with a public address/sound system upgrade.

In late 2023, Wisconsin Governor Tony Evers signed into effect a bill totaling $500 million of taxpayer money to allow for repairs, ensuring the team remains in Milwaukee until 2050, despite threats of relocation by MLB. Debuting in the 2024 season, American Family Field had many renovations done with the most notable changes being in center and right field, with a 12,077 square feet board in center, and a 2,840 square feet board in right. The Brewers partnered with ANC in order to provide the 8mm LED displays. The center field board ranks 3rd in the majors for overall size behind the New York Mets and Cleveland Guardians. The new center field board is over double the size of the old board at 5,940 square feet. LED displays were also added on the dugout and behind home plate. The 3rd Street Market Hall, a popular food hall and event venue in downtown Milwaukee, opened with four restaurants in the right field loge level. These vendors include: Kompali Tacos, Smokin' Jack's BBQ, Kawa (Asian fusion), and Anytime Arepa (Venezuelan). The team store in left field was also renovated.

The team also announced new parking technology in collaboration with the Interstate Parking Company, based out of Milwaukee. The goal of this partnership is to speed up the time it takes for parking at American Family Field, which can be up to an hour during the busiest times. Visitors may purchase parking in advance at a discounted rate, or may pay when they arrive via QR codes across the stadium grounds. Parking ambassadors aid in the parking process.

Plans for future improvements include a $25 million winterization of the stadium as well as improvements to the roof, elevators, suites, and other parts of the ballpark.

=== Sensory friendly ===
In June 2022 the Brewers announced the creation of a quiet area at American Family Field known as a sensory friendly area. The area is equipped with "sensory bags" to accommodate those with sensory processing disorders. The sensory bags contain noise-cancelling headphones, a fidget toy, verbal cue cards, and a weighted lap pad.

== Attendance ==
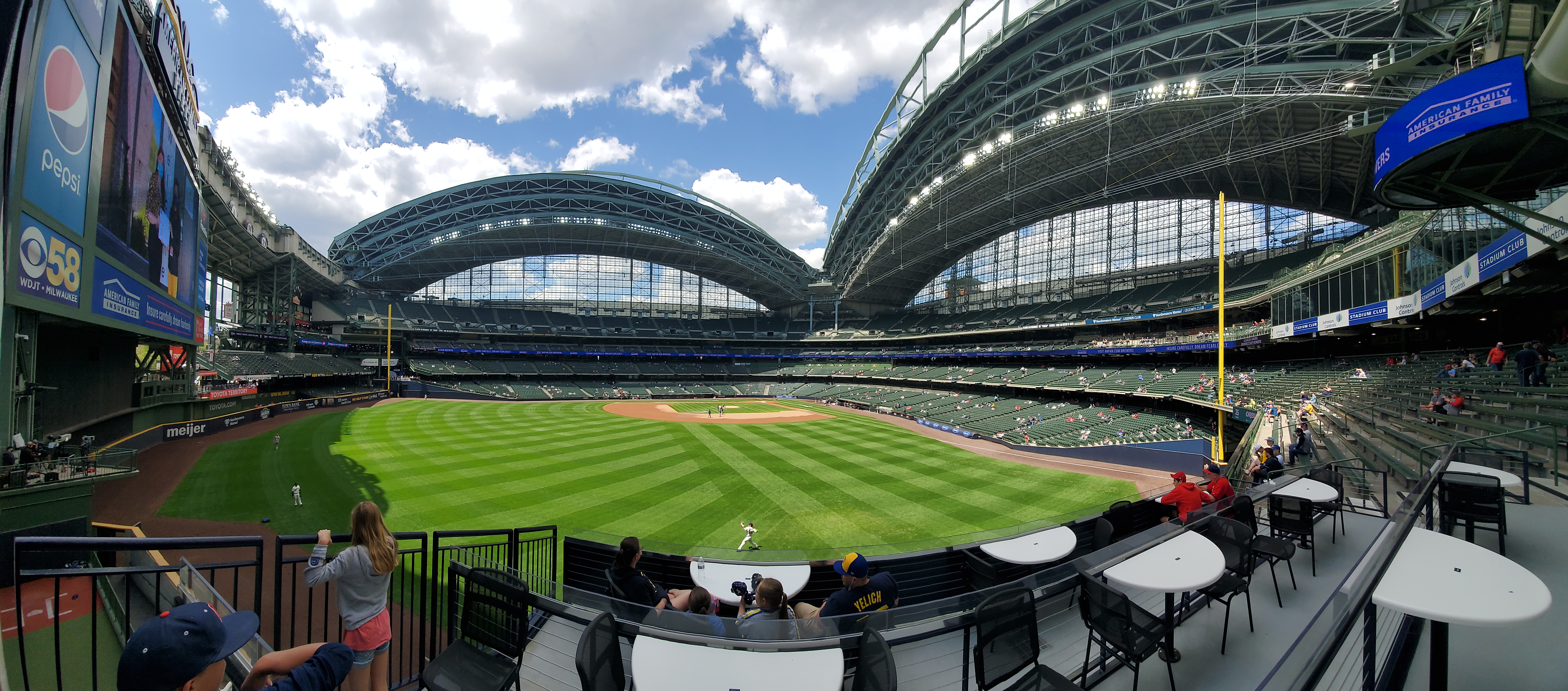
A panoramic view of AmFam Field

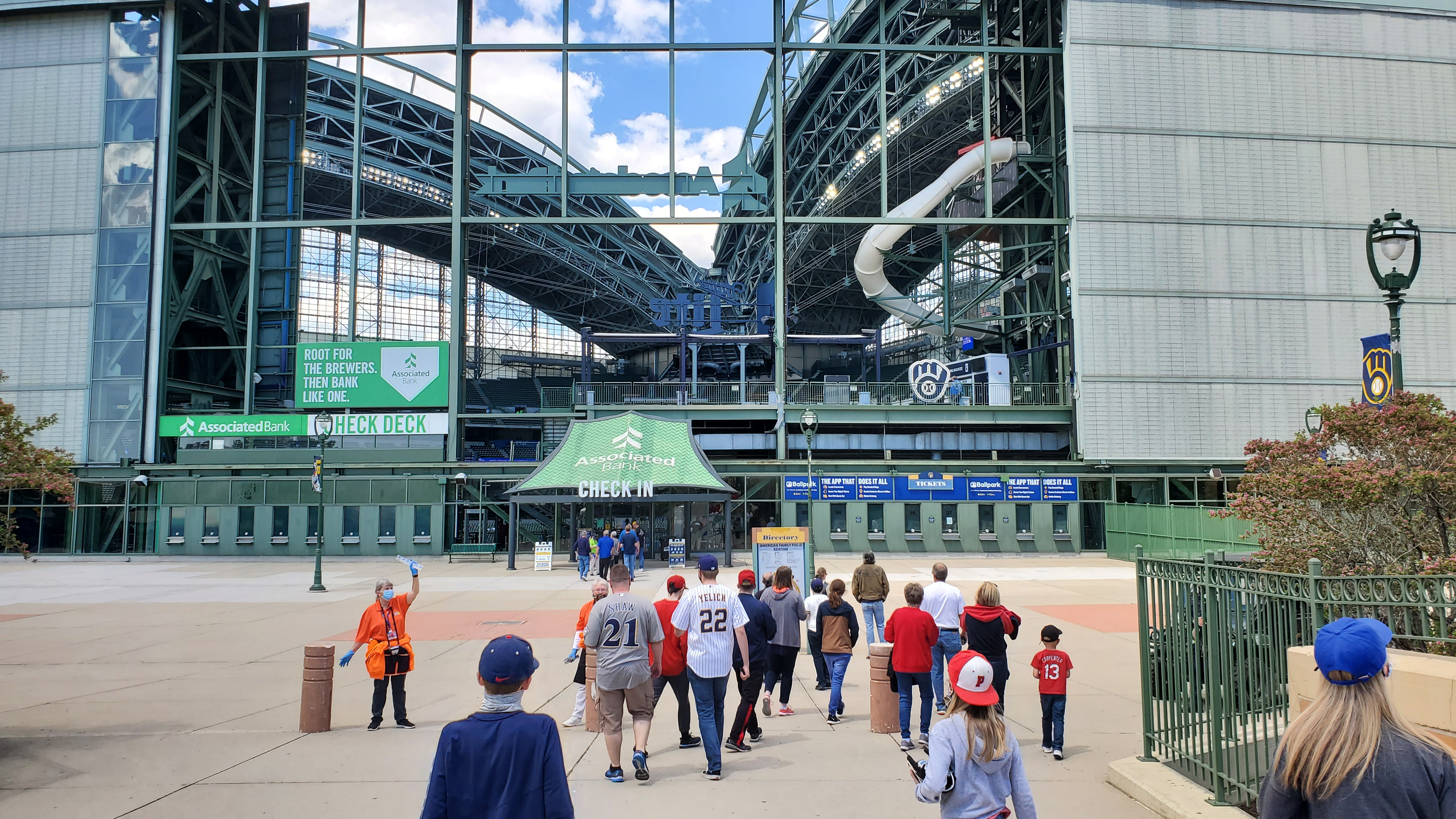
Fans cross a pedestrian bridge toward AmFam Field's eastern entrance

From the year American Family Field opened in 2001, the Brewers have averaged 31,783 fans per game, or 2,574,423 per season, while placing 11th out of 30 franchises in total attendance, despite having only eight winning seasons through the 2019 season, and having won only two MLB playoff series in just five total series appearances, and having the smallest market size of any Major League city. In 2011, the Brewers set a franchise record of 3,071,373, and beginning in 2004 they have attracted at least two million fans—an ongoing streak of 15 consecutive years, the 12th longest in Major League history. Prior to American Family Field, the previous such consecutive streak in Milwaukee baseball history was four years, from 1954 to 1957. Since 2007, except for the required reduced attendance in 2020 and 2021 due to the COVID-19 pandemic, the Brewers have drawn at least 2.5 million fans in 13 of 15 seasons, and have only had one season (2016), where they did not average 30,000+ fans per game.

Home attendance at American Family Field
Year	Total attendance	Games	Game average	Major League rank
2001	2,811,041	81	34,704	13th
2002	1,969,153	81	24,311	19th
2003	1,700,354	81	20,992	25th
2004	2,062,382	81	25,462	20th
2005	2,211,023	81	27,297	18th
2006	2,335,643	81	28,835	17th
2007	2,869,144	81	35,422	12th
2008	3,068,458	81	37,882	9th
2009	3,037,451	81	37,499	9th
2010	2,776,531	81	34,278	11th
2011	3,071,373	81	37,918	7th
2012	2,831,385	81	34,955	11th
2013	2,531,105	81	31,248	16th
2014	2,797,384	81	34,536	8th
2015	2,542,558	81	31,390	13th
2016	2,314,614	81	28,575	16th
2017	2,627,705	84 (Note: A three-game series that the Brewers were scheduled to play at Marlins Park against the Miami Marlins from September 15–17 was moved to Milwaukee due to concerns about Hurricane Irma.)	31,282	10th
2018	2,850,875	81	35,196	10th
2019	2,923,333	81	36,091	8th
2020	0	29	0 (Note: For the 2020 season, fans were not allowed in MLB stadiums due to the COVID-19 pandemic. For 2021, fans were allowed to attend, but for part of the season, it was with reduced capacity.)	-
2021	1,824,282	81	22,522	10th
2022	2,412,420	81 (Note: The Brewers played 81 home games as usual, but two of them were part of a doubleheader against the San Francisco Giants on September 8 and played before the same crowd.)	30,280	14th
2023	2,551,347	81	31,498	15th
2024	2,537,202	81	31,323	16th
2025	2,650,089	81	32,717	12th
2026	2,786,501	80 (Note: The Brewers only played 80 home games at American Family Field as one of their home games was played against the Atlanta Braves in Williamsport, Pennsylvania, at Bowman Field, as part of the MLB Little League Classic on August 23.)	34,831	10th
Total	64,093,353	2,056	31,635	

Postseason home attendance at American Family Field
Year	Total attendance	Games	Game average	Major League rank
2008	87,926	2	43,963	
2011	263,692	6	43,949	
2018	263,165	6	43,861	
2021	84,664	2	42,332	
2023	82,058	2	41,029	
2024	121,966	3	40,655	
2025	211,372	5	42,274	
2026	256,154	6	42,692	
Total	1,370,997	32	42,844	
All	65,464,350	2,088	31,809	

== Attractions ==
- Bernie Brewer, the team mascot, has a chalet above the left field seats. Following every Brewers home run and victory, Bernie slides into a home plate shaped platform, an homage to Bernie's slide into a giant beer mug at Milwaukee County Stadium. During the home run celebration at AmFam Field, a short burst of fireworks is fired and, above Bernie's chalet, lights spelling out the classic call of Brewers' longtime radio announcer Bob Uecker – "Get Up, Get Up, Get Outta Here, Gone!" – are illuminated.

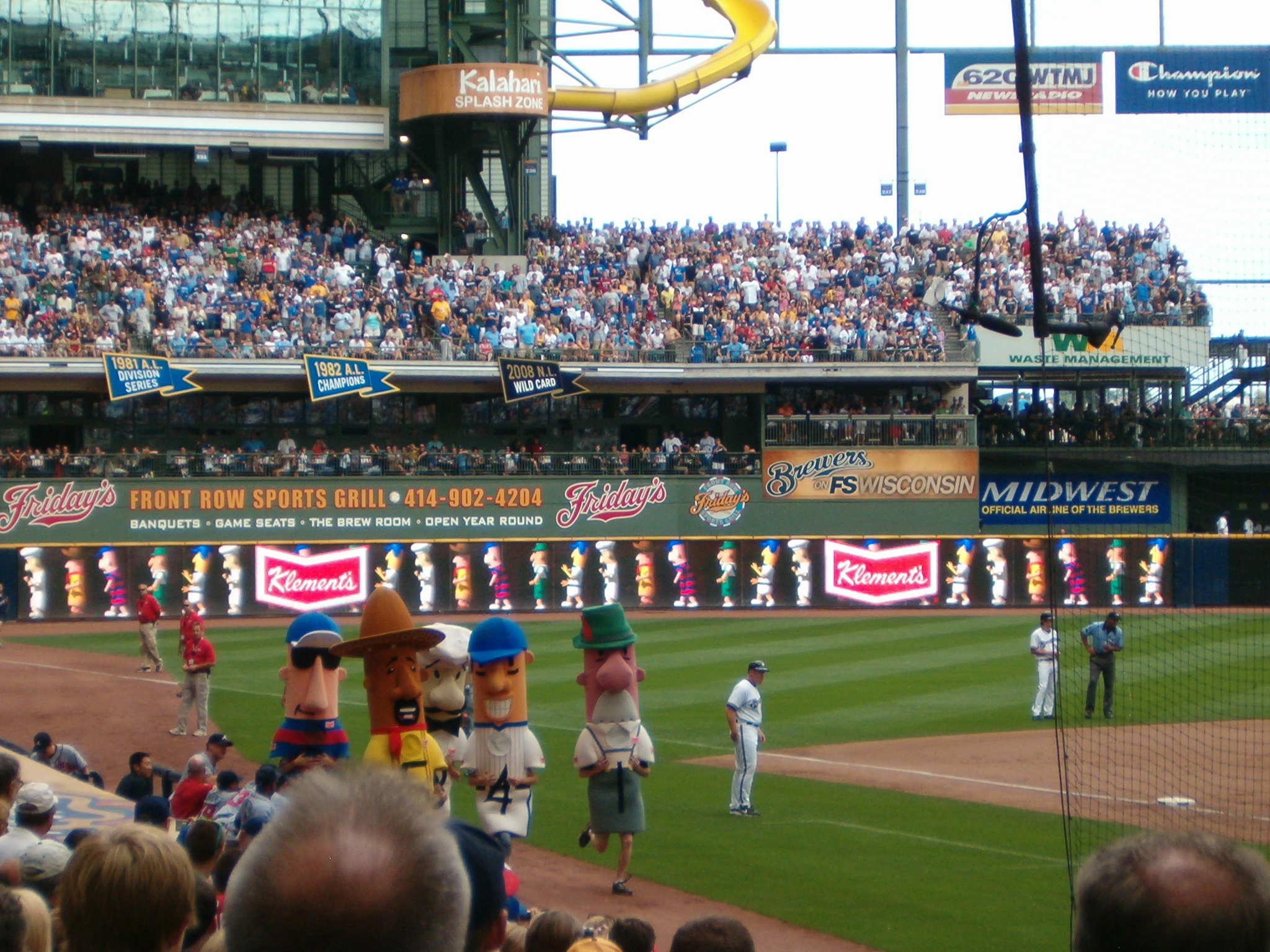
The Racing Sausages begin their run, with Bernie Brewer's slide viewable in background.

- The Johnsonville Sausage Race occurs during each game in the middle of the 6th inning. The current Racing Sausages are Bratwurst, Polish, Italian, Hot Dog and Chorizo. Chorizo was added for one race on July 29, 2006, and became a full-time participant in 2007. The Racing Sausages, along with Bernie Brewer, are common fixtures at community events around the Milwaukee area.
- During the 7th inning stretch, in addition to "Take Me Out to the Ballgame," fans at American Family Field sing "Roll Out the Barrel."
- The Barrelman mascot made his return on April 6, 2015. The barrelman served as the team's primary logo from 1970 to 1977.
- The Brewers have also set statues of legendary Milwaukee players Robin Yount and Hank Aaron outside the front entrance of American Family Field, as well as a statue of former team owner and MLB commissioner Bud Selig and one for Brewers longtime radio broadcaster Bob Uecker. An additional sculpture of Uecker was added to the highest point of seats in the ballpark, in reference to Uecker's famed Miller Lite commercial where he says, "I must be in the front row."
- Another sculpture, Teamwork by Omri Amrany, honors three Iron Workers Local 8 members killed during the construction of the stadium.
- Helfaer Field is a youth baseball facility located outside American Family Field. The infield is laid out upon the former footprint of the County Stadium infield, albeit in smaller Little League-compliant dimensions. The groundbreaking ceremony was held in August 2001. It was named in honor of the Evan and Marion Helfaer Foundation, which was founded in 1974. Evan Helfaer was an original investor in the Brewers.
- The American Family Field Walk of Fame was created in 2001 to honor both the Milwaukee Brewers and the Milwaukee Braves. It is located outside American Family Field on the plaza near the home plate entrances.
- The Brewers Wall of Honor was created in 2014 to commemorate Brewers players, coaches and executives who meet a set criteria based on service to the club or career accomplishments. It is located outside American Family Field on an exterior wall near the Hot Corner entrance.
- The Selig Experience is an exhibit to honor former Brewers owner and retired MLB commissioner Allan H. (Bud) Selig. It opened May 29, 2015.

== Notable events ==
=== Baseball ===
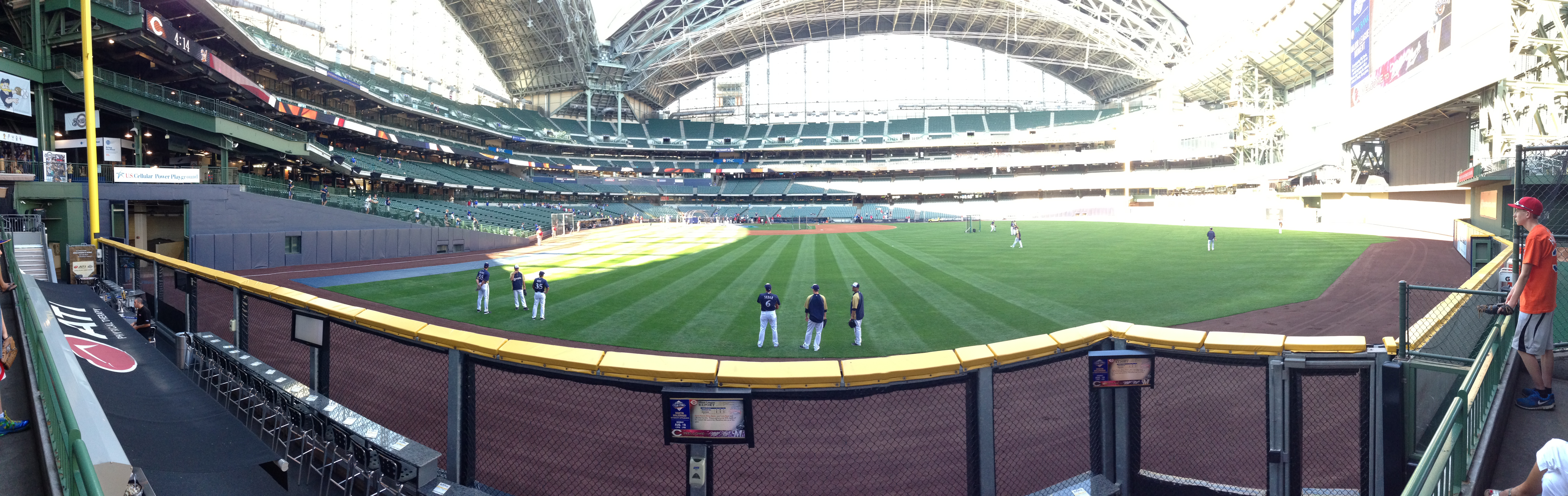
Batting practice prior to a Milwaukee Brewers–Cincinnati Reds game on August 17, 2013

Stadium prior to game 2 of the 2026 World Series

On opening day, April 6, 2001, President George W. Bush and MLB Commissioner Bud Selig had first pitch honors for the stadium. The park hosted the 2002 MLB All-Star Game, which ended infamously in a tie.

The first two games of the 2026 World Series were the first World Series games played at the stadium, with the Brewers facing the Tampa Bay Rays. For the remaining three games of the 2026 World Series that were played at Tampa Bay's Tropicana Field, the stadium hosted watch parties, where the television broadcast of the games were shown on the display board. All three of these watch parties were sold out, with approximately 31,000 tickets sold to each event. Aside from the lack of players on the field, all of the normal activities for a home game were carried out for the watch party audiences, including the Sausage Race.

==== Non-Brewer games ====
In April 2007, a heavy snowstorm in northern Ohio caused the Cleveland Indians to postpone their home opening series against the Seattle Mariners and forced the Indians to find a different location for their home series against the Los Angeles Angels of Anaheim. Major League Baseball took advantage of American Family Field's roof and moved the Indians-Angels series to Milwaukee. All seats were sold for $10 apiece, and attendance was 52,496 for the three games. The Indians took two out of three games from the Angels. The series was a reminder to many of the 1989 film Major League, which featured scenes filmed in Milwaukee County Stadium, though the film was about a fictionalized Cleveland Indians team. The first game of the series was played on the same day that the film's "Wild Thing Edition" was released on DVD. When Joe Borowski came in to close for the Indians, the song "Wild Thing" was played over the PA system, in an homage to the film. Also, the Indians' mascot Slider slid down Bernie Brewer's slide following Indians home runs. These games were the first to be played under American League rules in Milwaukee since 1997 (the Brewers' final season in the AL). Some Milwaukee fans commemorated the occasion by making unofficial t-shirts that said, "The Cleveland Indians of Milwaukee; Established 1989, Re-established 2007."

Hurricane Ike's landfall in Houston cut a three-game series between the Chicago Cubs and the Houston Astros to a two-game series and relocated the games to American Family Field on Sunday, September 14 and Monday, September 15, 2008. The park became the first neutral site in Major League history to host a no-hitter when the Cubs' Carlos Zambrano threw the first no-hitter in the history of the park as the Cubs shut out the Astros, 5–0. It was also the Cubs' first no-hitter since Milt Pappas pitched one against the San Diego Padres in 1972. The next day, Zambrano's teammate, Ted Lilly, took a no-hitter into the 7th inning, as the Cubs won, 6–1, sweeping the series in Milwaukee.

=== Bowling ===
American Family Field hosted the 2007 United States Bowling Congress Masters finals on Sunday, October 28, 2007. The playing surface was fitted with four bowling lanes for the tournament.

=== Concerts ===
Date	Artist	Opening act(s)	Tour / Concert name	Attendance	Revenue	Notes
May 19, 2001	George Strait	Alan Jackson; Lonestar; Lee Ann Womack; Brad Paisley; Sara Evans; Asleep At The Wheel; BR549	George Strait Country Music Festival	—	—	
June 26, 2001	'N Sync	Eden's Crush; A*Teens; Meredith Edwards; 3LW	PopOdyssey	34,148 / 44,978	$1,956,157	
September 27, 2003	Bruce Springsteen and the E Street Band	—	The Rising Tour	32,812 / 40,566	$2,451,588	
July 9, 2004	Randy Travis	—	—	—	—	
August 20, 2005	Bon Jovi; Goo Goo Dolls; Robert Randolph and the Family Band	—	Miller Brewing's 150th Anniversary Celebration	—	—	
August 28, 2008	Kid Rock; Sugarland	—	Harley Owners Group Anniversary Rally	—	—	
October 2, 2010	Dave Matthews; Willie Nelson; Neil Young; John Mellencamp and many others	—	Farm Aid's 25th Anniversary concert	—	—	The first time the charity event was held at a major league stadium.
May 18, 2013	Kenny Chesney; Eric Church	Eli Young Band; Kacey Musgraves	No Shoes Nation Tour	43,314 / 43,314	$4,306,664	
July 16, 2013	Paul McCartney	—	Out There	43,747 / 43,747	$4,114,943	Concert set an American Family Field record for largest non-baseball attendance
August 25, 2015	One Direction	Icona Pop	On the Road Again Tour	37,887 / 37,887	$3,256,963	
June 18, 2016	Kenny Chesney	Miranda Lambert; Little Big Town; Old Dominion	Spread the Love Tour	41,342 / 41,342	$4,812,602	
April 28, 2018	Kenny Chesney	Thomas Rhett; Old Dominion; Brandon Lay	Trip Around the Sun Tour	43,526 / 43,526	$5,136,660	
October 24, 2018	Ed Sheeran	Snow Patrol	÷ Tour	37,288 / 37,288	$3,390,498	Originally scheduled for October 23 but was rescheduled to give more time for stage setup after the 2018 National League Championship Series ended on October 20 (it would have moved to November had the Brewers advanced to the 2018 World Series).
April 26, 2019	Billy Joel	—	Billy Joel in Concert	41,237 / 41,237	$4,197,551	
May 14, 2022	Kenny Chesney	Dan + Shay; Old Dominion; Carly Pearce	Here and Now Tour	41,138 / 41,138	$5,459,692	Event was postponed from April 25, 2020, and May 8, 2021, due to the COVID-19 pandemic. First show at the stadium as American Family Field.
May 28, 2022	Eric Church	Brothers Osborne; Parker McCollum	—	—	—	
July 17, 2022	Mötley Crüe and Def Leppard	Poison; Joan Jett & The Blackhearts	The Stadium Tour	39,864 / 39,864	$5,175,001	The event was the fastest sellout in American Family Field history.
April 14, 2023	Morgan Wallen	Ernest; Bailey Zimmerman; Hardy	One Night at a Time World Tour	—	—	First artist to perform twice on one tour.
April 15, 2023	Morgan Wallen	Ernest; Bailey Zimmerman; Hardy	One Night at a Time World Tour	—	—	First artist to perform twice on one tour.
June 3, 2023	George Strait	Chris Stapleton; Little Big Town	2023 Stadium Shows	46,641 / 46,641	-	
August 14, 2023	P!NK	Grouplove; Pat Benatar and Neil Giraldo	Summer Carnival	46,644 / 46,644	-	First female to headline any stadium in Wisconsin. Broke American Family Field concert attendance record.
April 12, 2024	Luke Combs	Cody Jinks; Charles Wesley Godwin; The Wilder Blue	Growin' Up and Gettin' Old Tour			
April 13, 2024	Luke Combs	Jordan Davis; Mitchell Tenpenny; Drew Parker; Colby Acuff	Growin' Up and Gettin' Old Tour			
June 22, 2024	Kenny Chesney; Zac Brown Band	Megan Moroney; Uncle Kracker	Sun Goes Down 2024 Tour			
August 24, 2024	Green Day	The Smashing Pumpkins; Rancid; The Linda Lindas	The Saviors Tour			

=== Soccer ===
During the 2014 All-Star break, American Family Field hosted an untelevised international friendly match between Swansea City and Chivas of Guadalajara on July 16, 2014. The soccer pitch was laid out in a first baseline-to-left field configuration, with a narrower width than a standard soccer pitch due to the constraints of the field. The teams played to a 1–1 draw in front of about 31,000 in attendance.

During the 2015 All-Star Break, American Family Field hosted a friendly between Mexican side Club Atlas and English Premier League side Newcastle United on July 14, 2015. Club Atlas won the match 2–1.

After a three-year hiatus, American Family Field once again hosted a friendly match between Mexican sides C.F. Pachuca and Club León. Pachuca won the match 3–1.

Date	Winning Team	Result	Losing Team	Tournament	Spectators
July 16, 2014	(Wales) Swansea City	1-1	(Mexico) Guadalajara	International Friendly	31,000
July 14, 2015	(Mexico) Club Atlas	2-1	(England) Newcastle United	International Friendly	21,256
July 11, 2018	(Mexico) C.F. Pachuca	3-1	(Mexico) Club León	International Friendly	18,321

=== Basketball ===
On November 11, 2022, the University of Wisconsin Badgers hosted a basketball doubleheader at American Family Field called the "Brew City Battle". The event featured the Wisconsin Badgers men's team playing against the Stanford University Cardinal and the Wisconsin Badgers women's team playing against the Kansas State Wildcats. The Badgers beat the Cardinal 60 to 50 in the men's game while they lost 63 to 77 in the women's game against the Wildcats.

=== Movie premiere ===
On August 11, 2012, American Family Field hosted an event called "Field of Honor: A Salute to the Greatest Generation". Over 30,000 tickets were sold for the event, which included the premiere showing of Honor Flight, a documentary detailing the Honor Flight movement, where veterans of World War II are flown into Washington, D.C., on commercial flights via donations and non-profit organizations in order to visit the National World War II Memorial in person.

=== Arctic Tailgate ===
The Arctic Tailgate is an annual event where fans camp outside American Family Field the day before single game tickets are sold, which is usually the last weekend of February. (It is delayed or moved into the stadium's heated concourse if the temperatures are well below 0 °F (−18 °C) for the safety of fans.) The tradition is said to have started as early as the 1990s where Brewers fans would try to be the first to acquire tickets for Opening Day. Since 2006, the Brewers have made it an official event, even providing the waiting fans coffee, hot chocolate, and doughnuts in the morning, discounts on tickets for the first week of games in the season, as well as a free lunch consisting of a hot dog, chips, and a soda, eaten in a heated tent afterwards. Over 101,000 tickets were sold for the 2015 Arctic Tailgate.

=== In film ===
American Family Field was also a major filming location for the motion picture Mr. 3000, which centered on a fictional Brewers player played by comedian Bernie Mac.

=== 25th Anniversary Alumni Home Run Derby ===
On July 25, 2025, the Milwaukee Brewers hosted the Alumni Home Run Derby at American Family Field as part of their 25th anniversary celebration of the stadium. The event followed a game against the Miami Marlins and featured former players like Prince Fielder, Ryan Braun, and Carlos Gómez. It was contested in a team format led by Braun and Gómez, followed by an individual showdown between Keon Broxton and Corey Hart. Broxton won the derby and recreated Fielder's home run celebration where teammates fell like bowling pins upon his reaching home. Nearly 42,000 people stayed after the game to watch the derby.

== Climate ==
American Family Field

Climate chart (precipitation, max. and min. temperature)
J	F	M	A	M	J	J	A	S	O	N	D
97 −5 −11	101 −2 −10	68 6 −6	165 18 3	111 22 7	138 24 15	100 29 18	95 29 18	67 24 14	92 16 7	64 9 0	78 −2 −8
- █ Average max. and min. temperatures in °C
- █ Precipitation totals in mm
Imperial conversion
J	F	M	A	M	J	J	A	S	O	N	D
3.8 23 12	4 28 14	2.7 43 21	6.5 64 37	4.4 72 45	5.4 75 59	3.9 84 64	3.7 84 64	2.6 75 57	3.6 61 45	2.5 48 32	3.1 28 18
- █ Average max. and min. temperatures in °F
- █ Precipitation totals in inches

== Photo gallery ==
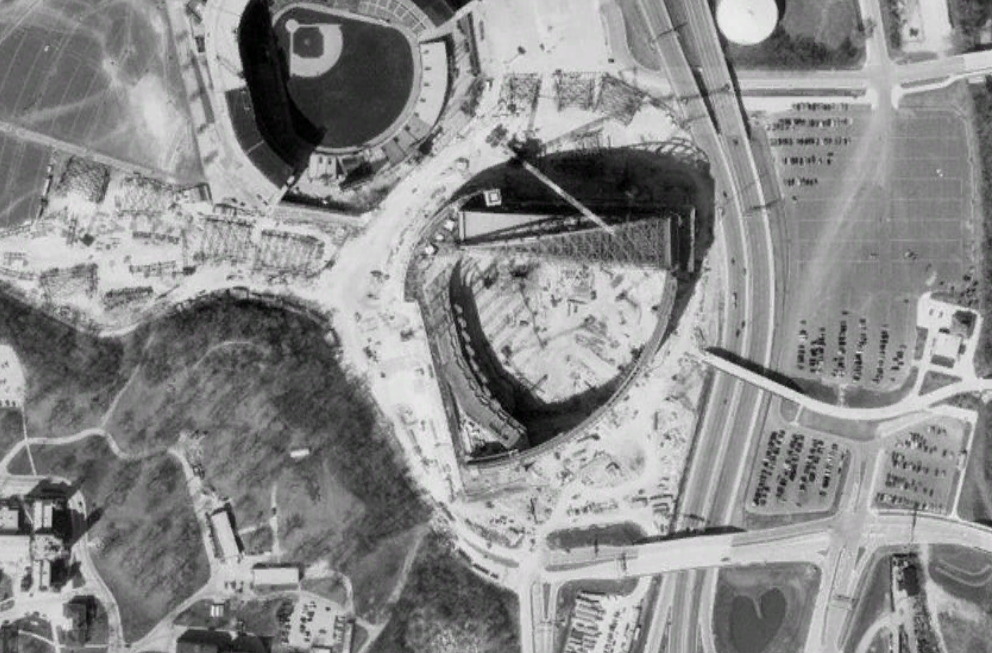
American Family Field, then known as Miller Park, during construction on March 31, 2000. Milwaukee County Stadium is adjacent.

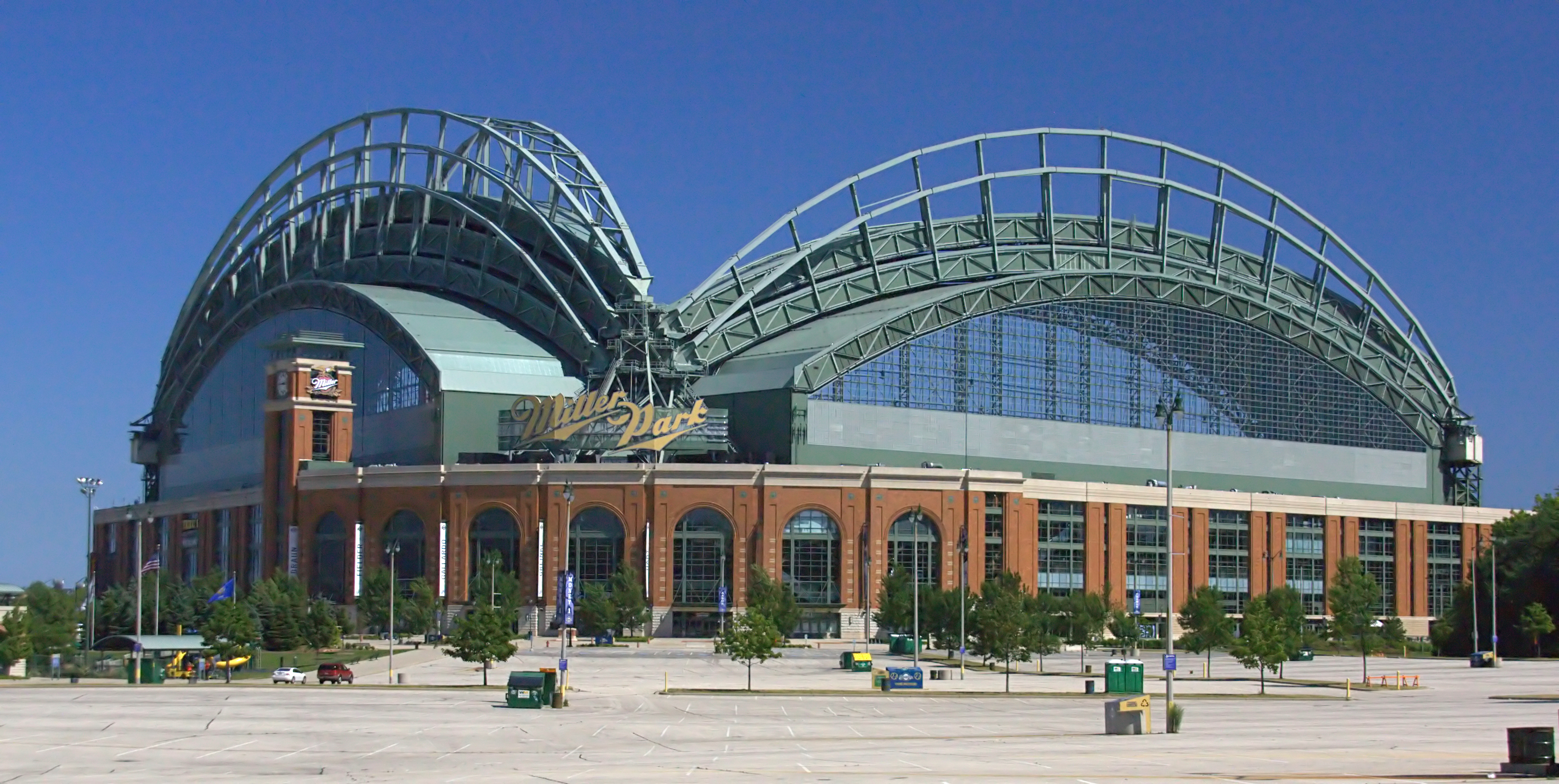
Exterior view showing retractable roof

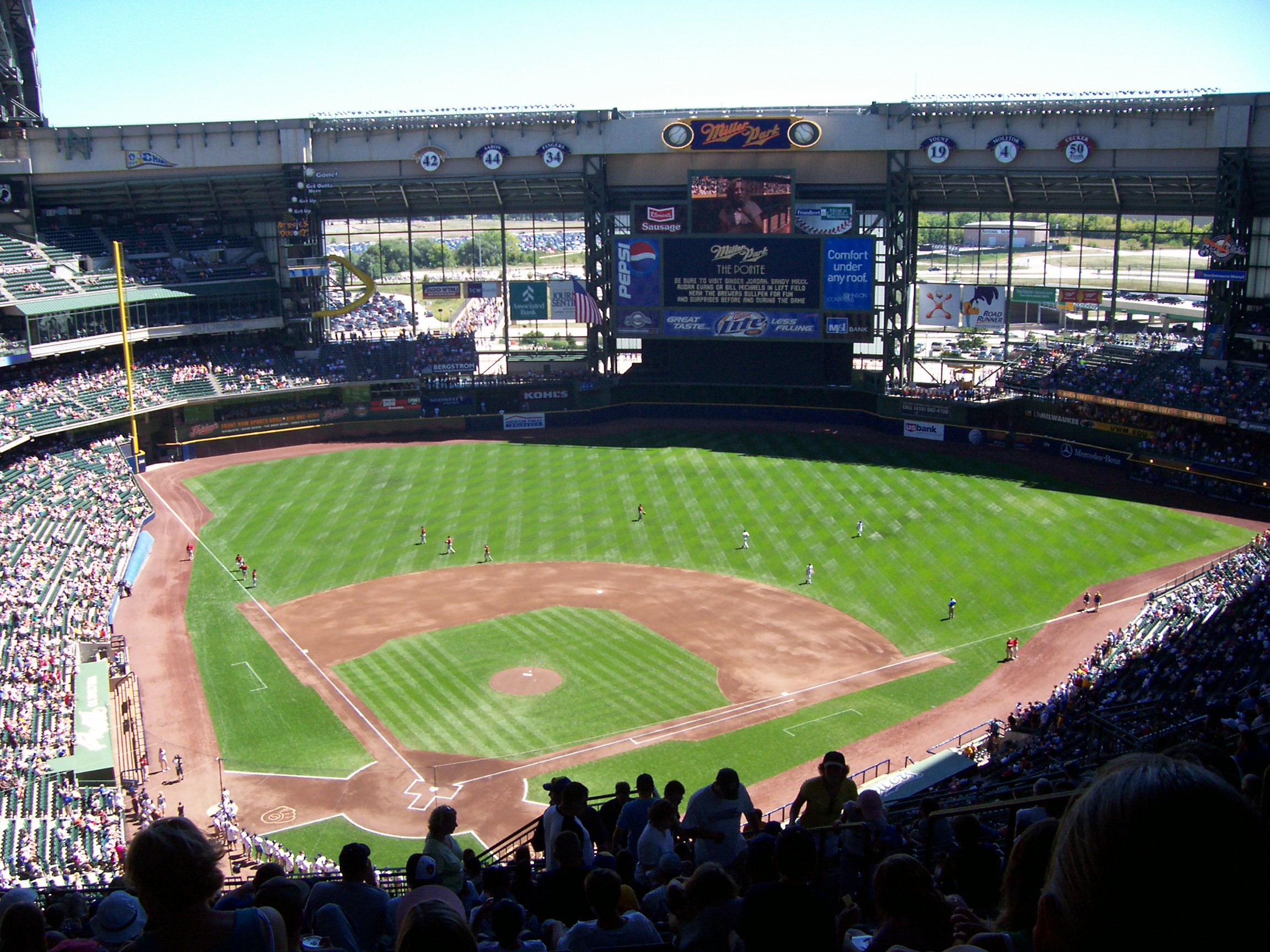
American Family Field in 2006

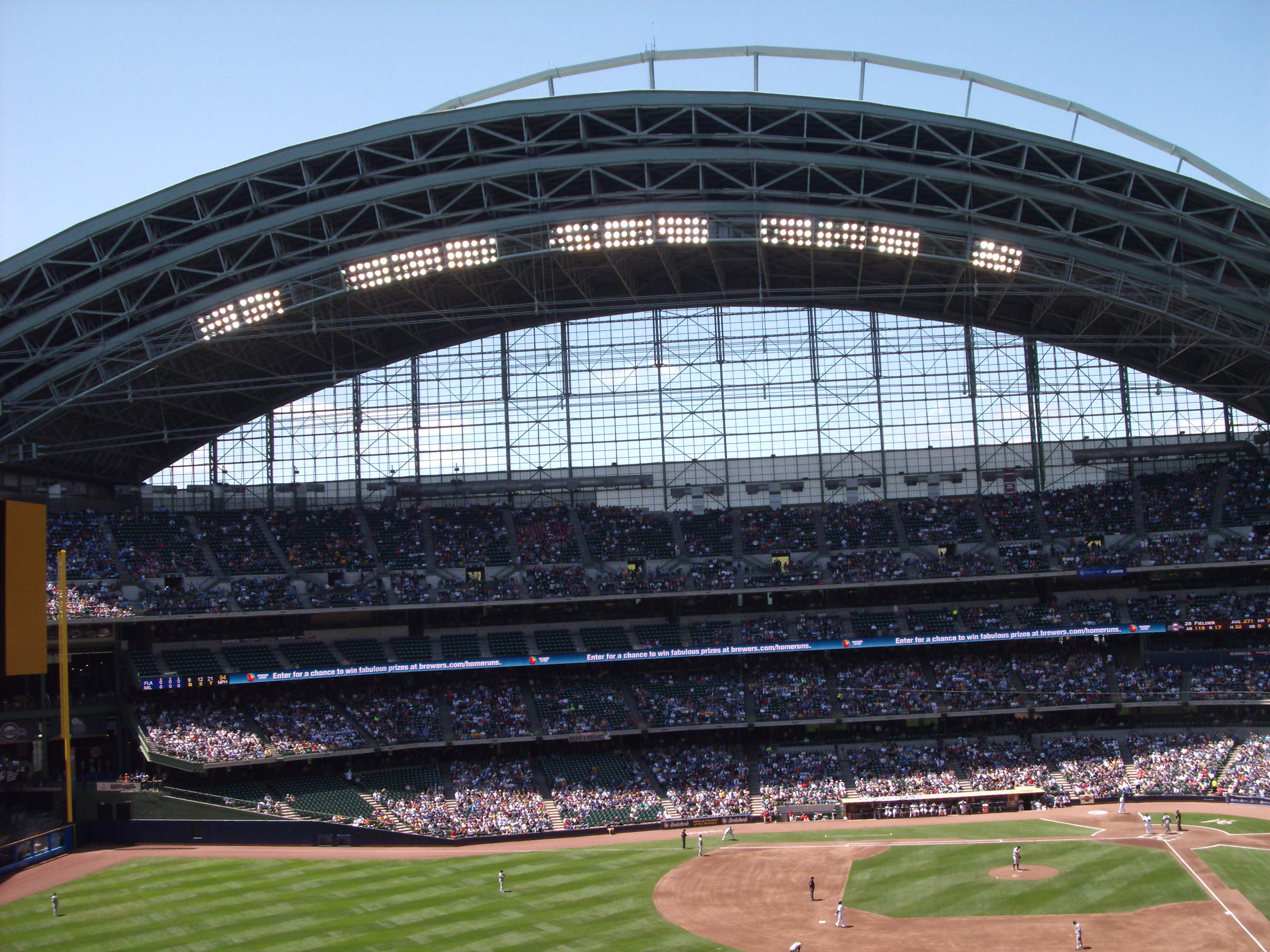
American Family Field in 2009

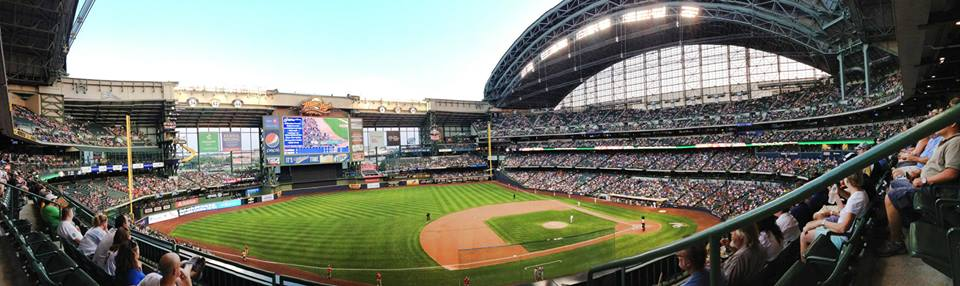
American Family Field panorama (August 20, 2013)

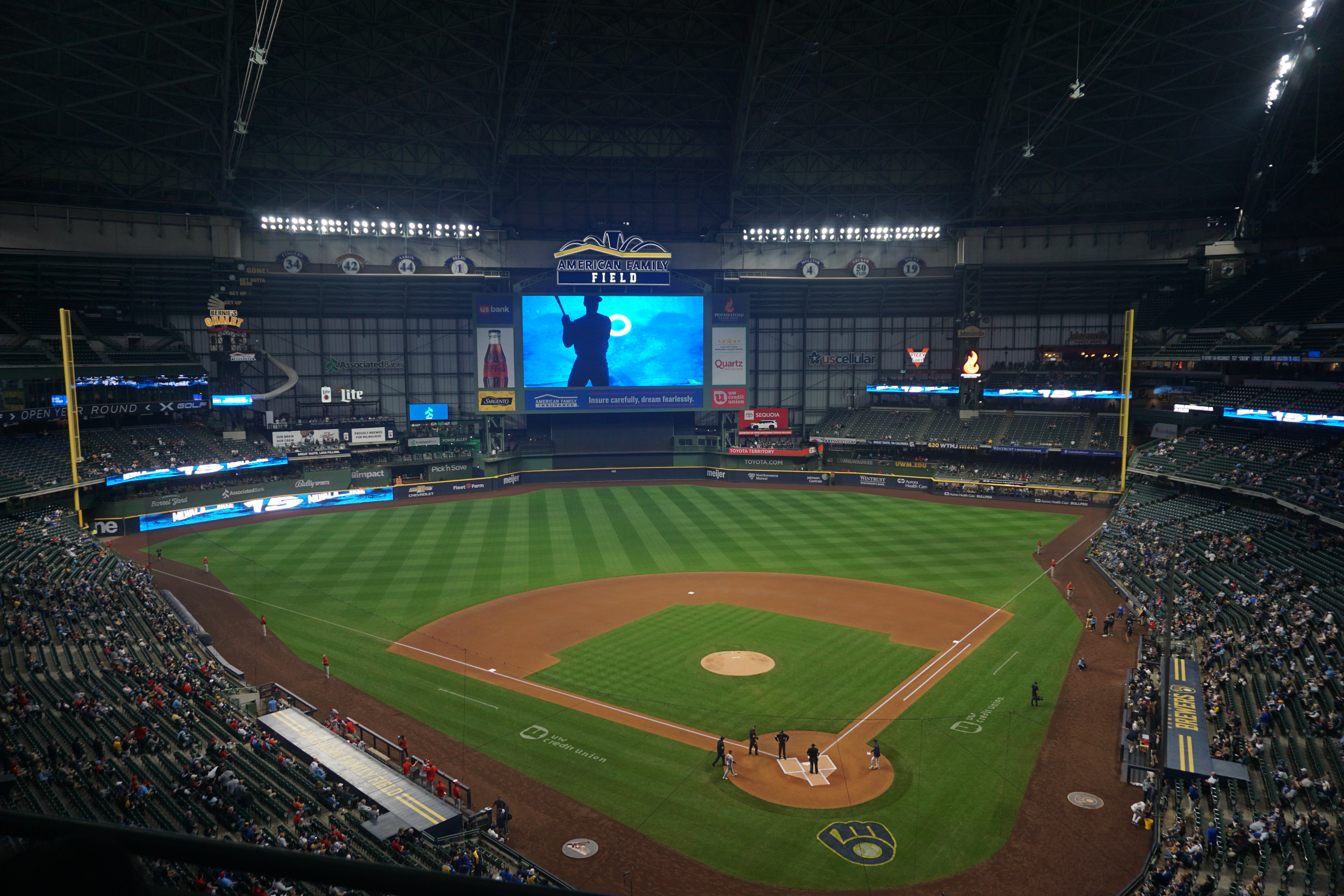
American Family Field with the roof closed in 2023

Former logo as Miller Park

== See also ==
- List of baseball parks in Milwaukee
- List of NCAA Division I baseball venues
- Teamwork, a memorial sculpture at the stadium
- Selig Monument, a sculpture in tribute to Bud Selig

Events and tenants
Preceded by Milwaukee County Stadium	Home of the Milwaukee Brewers; 2001 – present	Succeeded by Current
Preceded by Safeco Field	Host of the All-Star Game; 2002	Succeeded by U.S. Cellular Field
Preceded by Jacobs Field	Home of the Cleveland Indians; April 10–12, 2007	Succeeded by Jacobs Field
Preceded by Minute Maid Park	Home of the Houston Astros; September 14–15, 2008	Succeeded by Minute Maid Park
