= Helfaer Field =

Baseball field in Milwaukee, Wisconsin

Coordinates: 43.030141°N 87.973918°W

- Interactive map of Helfaer Field
- Address: Milwaukee, Wisconsin; United States
- Capacity: 722

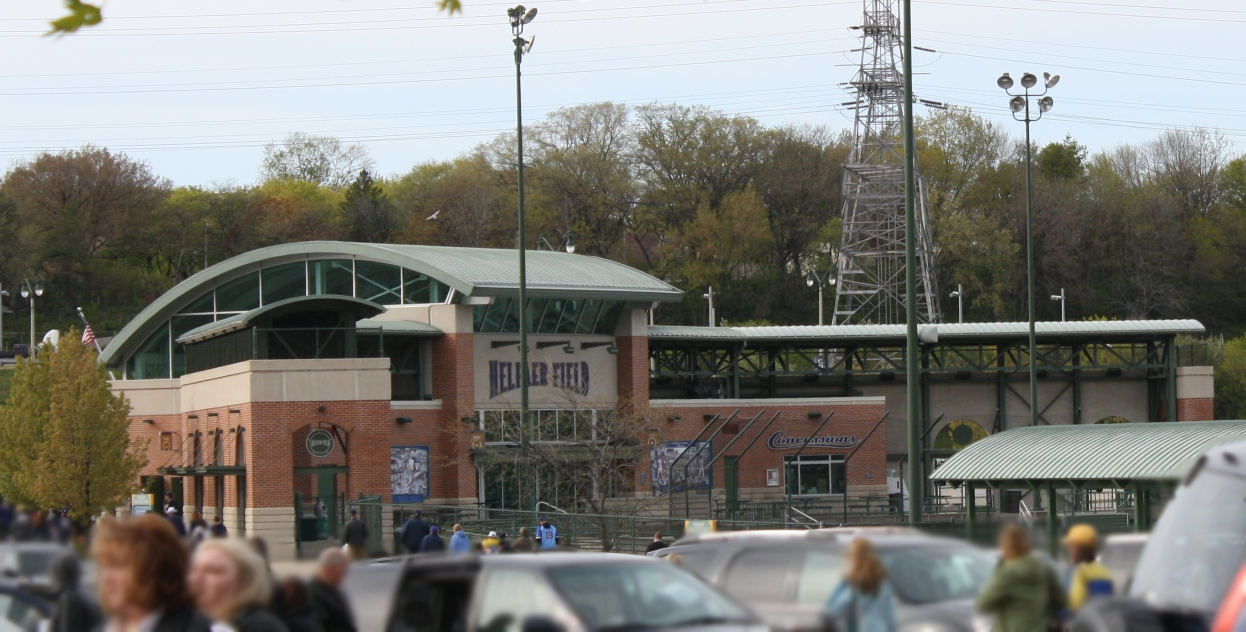
Helfaer Field

Helfaer Field, in Milwaukee, Wisconsin, is a Little League baseball field located next to American Family Field, home of the Milwaukee Brewers.

Opening in 2002 and costing $3.1 million to construct, the field seats up to 722 people. Built near the infield of the former Milwaukee County Stadium (the previous home of the Brewers which was demolished in 2001), it retains the old foul poles from that field. The location of former home plate for Milwaukee County Stadium is located in marked batters boxes up from third base. Helfaer Field has dimensions of 200 feet to left, center, and right fields. The fences are six feet high.

The field is named for Evan Helfaer, a part-owner of the Brewers when they arrived in Milwaukee. A foundation in his name provided the funds to build the field.

== See also ==
- List of baseball parks in Milwaukee
