= 2023 Taichung crane collapse =

Railway accident in Taiwan

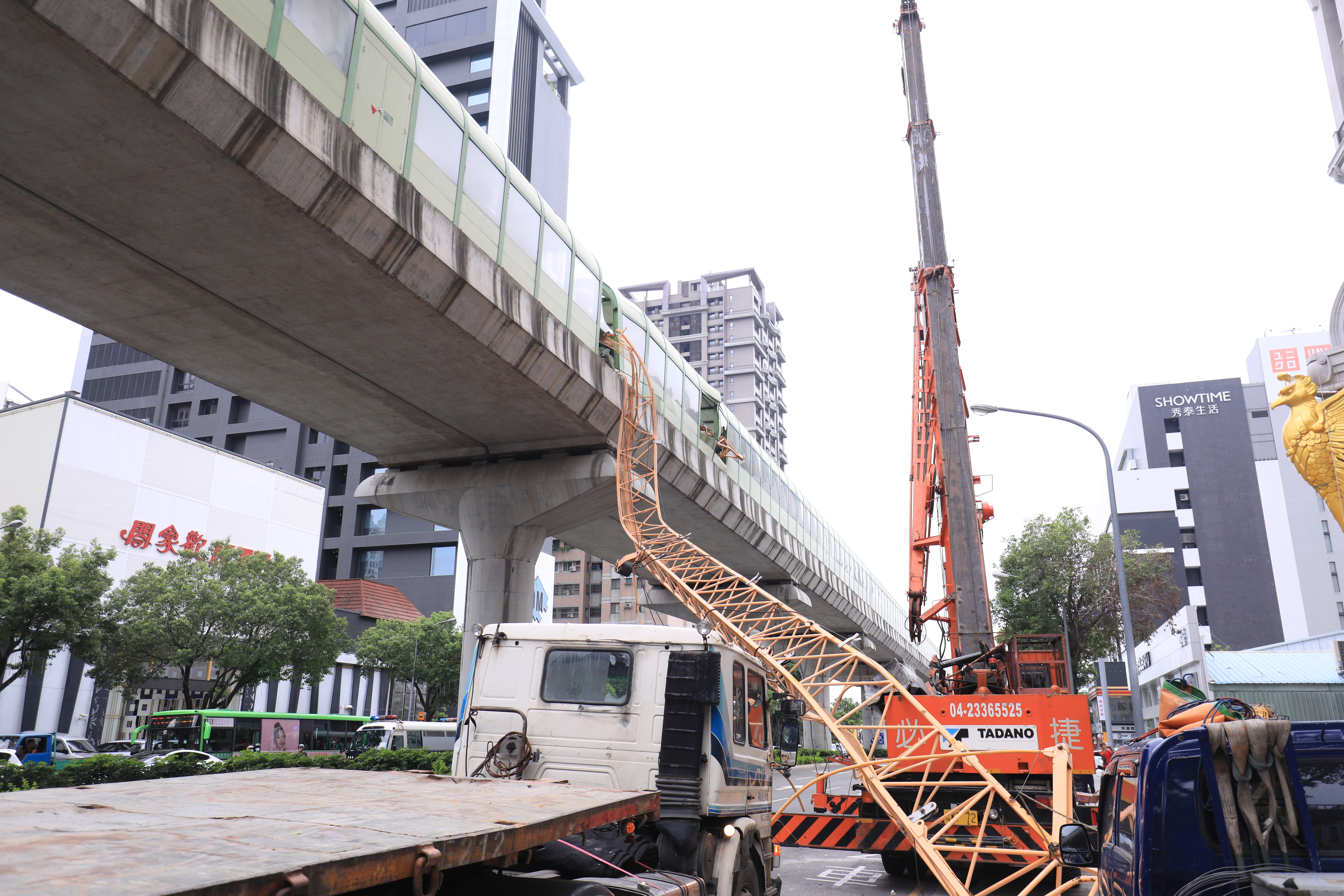
- Tower crane collapsed onto the elevated track of Green line, Taichung MRT

Details
- Date: May 10, 2023; 12:27pm
- Location: Near Feng-le Park metro station, Taichung
- Country: Taiwan
- Line: Green line
- Operator: Taichung Mass Rapid Transit System Co
- Incident type: Collision between train and crane
- Cause: Line obstructed and inadqueate emergency stop facility

Statistics
- Trains: 1 Kawasaki-TRSC Green Line driverless EMU
- Deaths: 1
- Injured: 10

On May 10, 2023, a construction crane fell 30 floors from a construction site of Highwealth Construction Corp onto a moving Taichung MRT Green line train south of Feng-le Park metro station, Taichung, Taiwan, killing 1 and injuring 10 passengers on board. The Taiwan Transportation Safety Board titled this incident of "Taichung Mass Rapid Transit's Trainset 03/04 at Fongle Park Station" (Chinese: 1120510臺中捷運公司列車豐樂公園站撞及外物事故).

The deceased passenger, legal scholar Lin Shu-ya, 52, was ejected out of the train carriage upon impact, resulting in her being crushed under the same train.

One passenger on board, a Canadian national, claimed that the driverless train was stationary when the crane fell onto the tracks and the train then proceeded to drive and collide straight onto the fallen crane.

== Investigation ==
The onboard train attendant followed company procedures to contact the control center about the crane obstructing the track. However, the control center at Taichung MRT would require 20 seconds to activate the emergency brakes remotely, which was insufficient to prevent the collision. The passenger emergency buttons on board the train were not designed to immediately stop the train.

The Taichung District Prosecutors Office questioned Taichung MRT staff involved in the incident and ten Highwealth Construction Corp personnel who were responsible for the operation of the construction crane.

The operations control center detected a loss of power caused by the fallen crane, but power was automatically restored shortly after. Half of the control center staff were on meal break at time of the incident.

The Taiwan Transportation Safety Board concluded in June 2024 that the primary reasons for the collapse were a failure to ensure proper operation of a tower crane and a lack of clear measures for restricting or prohibiting construction on either side of Taichung Metro tracks. The lack of an emergency train stop feature at stations was also cited as a probable cause of the accident.

=== Timeline of incident ===
At a press conference, Taichung MRT revealed that based on CCTV footage of the train and the station before the fallen crane, the following events occurred:

- 12:26:50 – Trainset 03/04 entered the station
- 12:27:04 – Construction crane fell onto the track, breaching the noise barrier
- 12:27:14 – Station security reported incident to station supervisor
- 12:27:22 – Trainset 03/04 doors closes
- 12:27:26 – Staff onboard trainset 03/04 found track obstruction, contacted control center and attempted to open the manual driving control panel to stop the train
- 12:27:30 – Trainset 03/04 departed the station
- 12:27:45 – Trainset 03/04 collided with the fallen construction crane on track
- 12:27:52 – Trainset 03/04 came to a complete stop

== Reactions ==
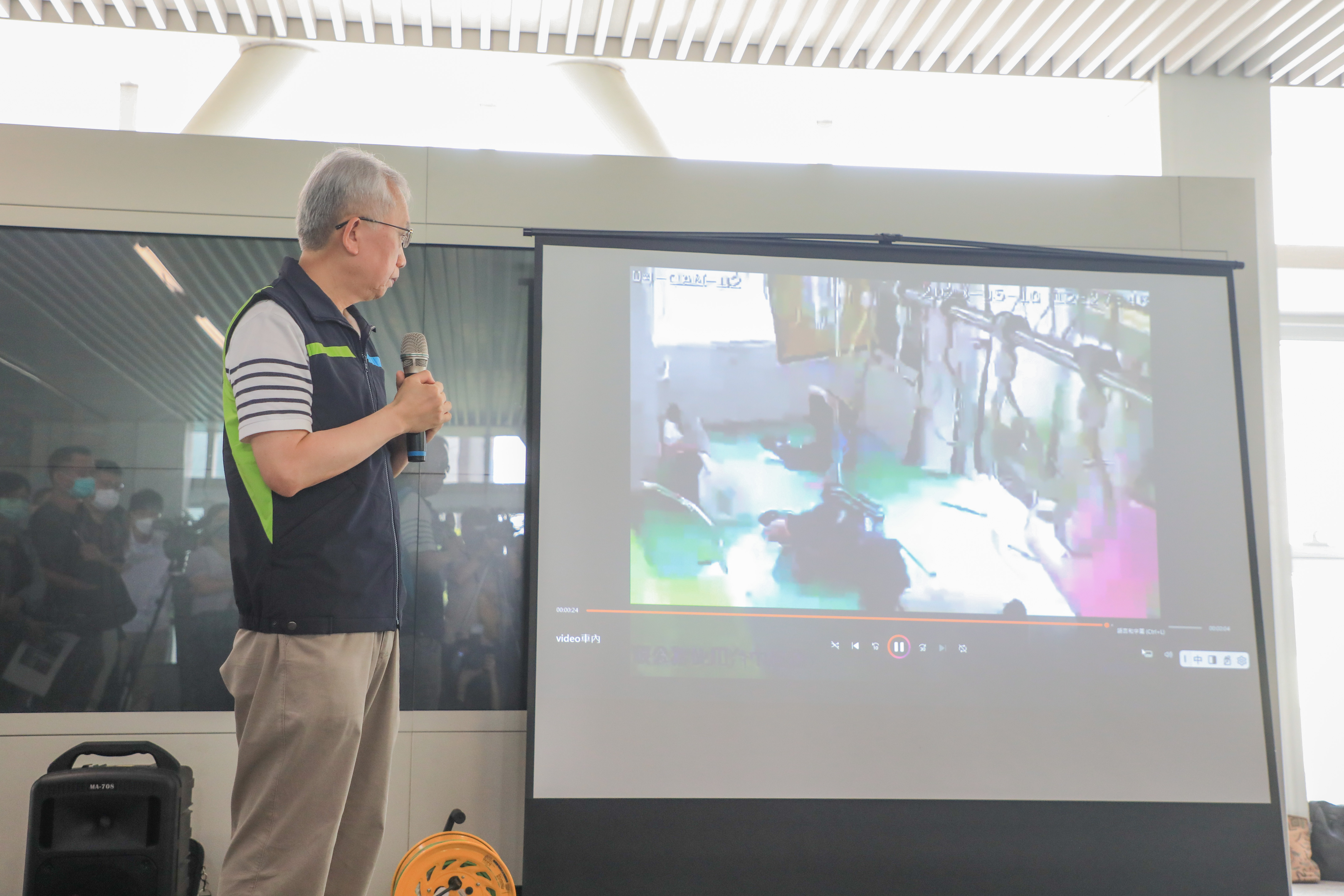
The acting chairman of Taichung MRT at the press conference explaining timeline of the collapse. He resigned shortly after this conference.

Taichung MRT said they intended to seek at least TWD 0.2 billion (USD6.5 million) in compensation against Highwealth Construction Corp for damage and losses resulting from the collapse.

Other metro operators in Taiwan began to review and secure ongoing construction sites that were situated near the tracks.

Taipei Metro admitted that the existing procedures regarding driverless trains, such as the Wenhu Line, were inadequate to stop the train in time under a similar scenario as the track circuit would not be broken and detect a fallen crane, and staff opening the manual driving panel or informing the control centre to cut off power would have taken too long. Taipei Metro promised to develop new procedures to deal with such scenarios, and in the meantime metro staff were authorized to deliberately obstruct the platform or train doors from closing in order to prevent the train from moving off.

The acting chairman of Taichung MRT resigned after he was criticized for his performance post-collapse.

Taichung MRT proposed changes to procedures to prevent collapse of a similar nature. Changes in protocol included introducing a new standardized hand signal for staff indicating emergency stop is necessary, encouraging staff and passengers to prevent the doors from closing by obstructing the doors to prevent a driverless train from departing after witnessing an incident, and relocating the key to a separate, more accessible holder to allow roving staff to more easily open the manual driving panel to access the emergency stop button. Taichung MRT also promised updates to emergency devices at stations and obstruction detection devices that will allow a train to stop in time or prevent its departure in similar circumstances.

In August 2024, two workers were indicted on charges of negligent manslaughter.

== See also ==
- 2021 Hualien train derailment
- 2026 Sikhio train disaster
- 2008 Manhattan crane collapse
- Big Blue crane collapse
- Mecca crane collapse
- Seattle crane collapse
