= 303 East 51st Street =

Skyscraper in Manhattan, New York

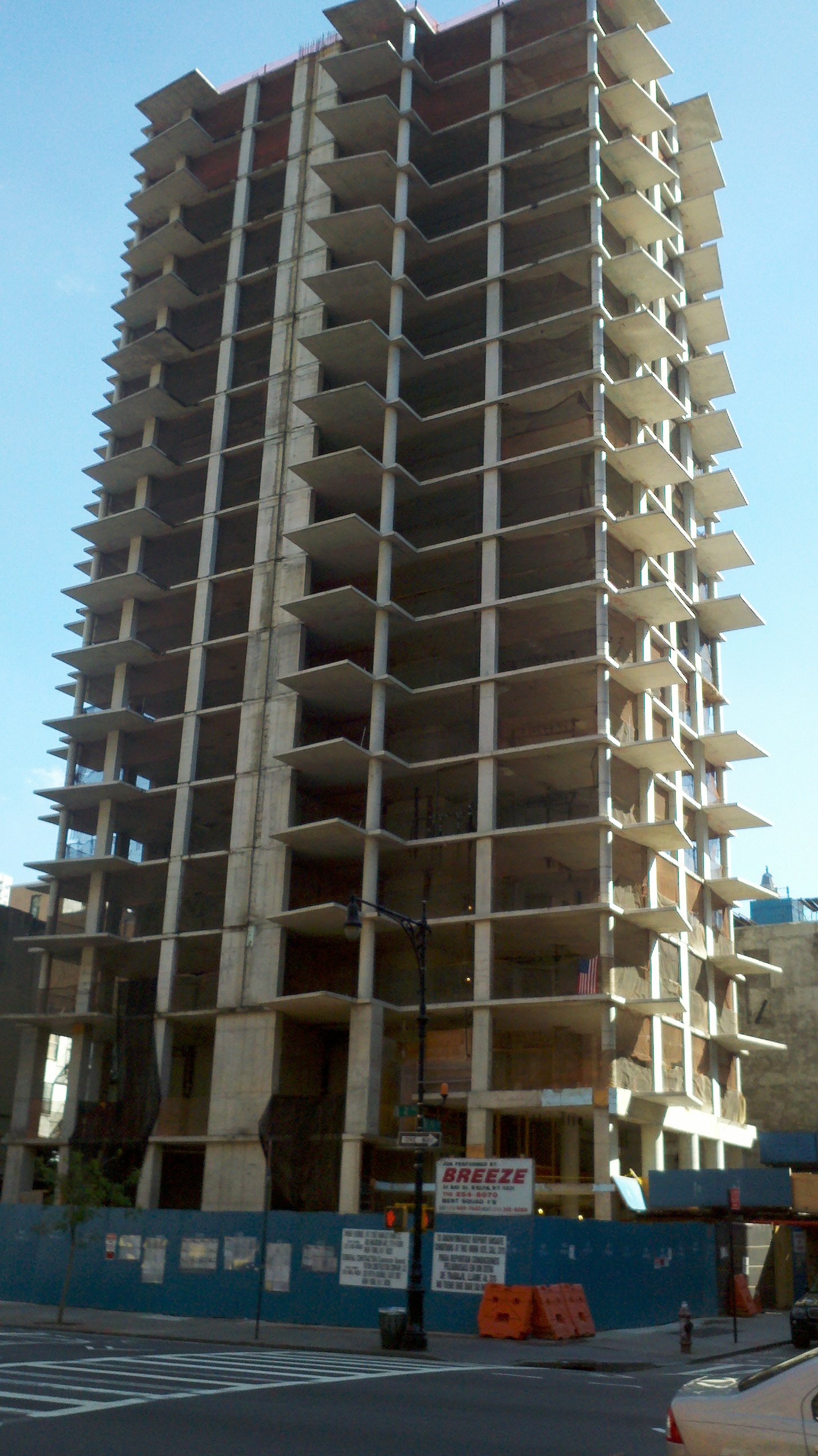
- Unfinished apartment building at 303 East 51st Street after a fatal crane collapse on March 15, 2008
- Interactive map of the 303 East 51st Street area

General information
- Status: Complete
- Type: Residential
- Coordinates: 40.7556°N 73.9676°W
- Construction started: 2007
- Completed: 2015
- Cost: US$ 70 million

Height
- Antenna spire: 360 feet (110 m)

Technical details
- Floor count: 32

Design and construction
- Architect: Garrett Gourlay Architect
- Developer: HFZ Capital Group; Kennelly Development Company

303 East 51st Street is a skyscraper at Second Avenue and 51st Street in the Turtle Bay neighborhood of Manhattan in New York City, United States. The residential building is 360 ft (110 m) with 32 floors.

The building was under construction when, on March 15, 2008, the luffing-jib tower crane used to construct the skyscraper snapped off and fell, killing seven people in what Mayor Michael Bloomberg called the worst construction accident in New York City's recent history.

== History ==
The original design for the skyscraper was a 40-story building that stood 470 feet (140 m) tall. On December 19, 2007, during the building's construction, the developer decided to scale up the building slightly to 44 stories for 117 residential units and 504 ft (154 m) tall. It was only a few months later that the crane collapsed and construction was halted.

Construction at the site was completed in 2015. The finished building, the Halcyon Building, has 32 floors and its street address is 305 East 51st Street.

== 2008 Manhattan crane collapse ==
On March 15, 2008, a crane owned by New York Crane & Equipment collapsed during construction. Seven people were killed and 24 others were injured. It was a luffing-jib tower crane manufactured by Favco that was 200 feet (61 m) tall at the time of the collapse. The accident occurred when workers were attaching a new steel collar to anchor it to the building at the 18th floor, as part of an operation to extend the crane upwards. The OSHA investigation determined that the Favco instructions for lifting a stabilizing collar to the ninth floor level were not followed, using only half the number of polyester slings recommended. The overloaded slings failed, causing the collar to drop and dislodge two lower-level collars from the building. This left the crane without any lateral support, allowing it to topple.

Before the crane accident, New York City Department of Buildings (DOB) had already issued 13 citations for safety violations at the construction site, two of which were considered serious violations. The DOB and Mayor Michael Bloomberg later stated, to the ire of local residents, that the infractions were normal for a project of that scale.

Furthermore, after 311 registered a complaint stating the crane had become structurally detached from the building, the DOB scheduled an inspection for March 4, 2008, a little over one week before the crane collapsed. On March 4, a DOB inspector filed a report stating that no safety violations were identified at the site; however, the inspector was later charged with falsifying a report after it was determined that no inspection took place on March 4. The DOB commissioner stated that, even if the site had been inspected on March 4, the collapse would not have been prevented because the crane was in a different position at the time of the collapse.

In the wake of the crane accident, the owners of a 2nd Avenue building that was damaged when the crane collapsed were planning to demolish the building when they were sued by the owner of Crave Ceviche Bar, a tenant of the building, in response to those plans. The building owner said the building had sustained irreparable damage and it therefore must be demolished so the owner could rebuild. The building owner settled the lawsuit and a settlement of over $1 million was agreed upon, which allowed the owner of Crave Ceviche Bar to reopen in a different location and therefore continue his business.
