= 2006 Mecca hostel collapse =

Coordinates: 21.416°N 39.816°E

- Location of Makkah Region in Saudi Arabia
- Date: January 5, 2006
- Location: Mecca, Makkah Region, Saudi Arabia
- Deaths: 76
- Injuries: 62

The 2006 Mecca hostel collapse occurred on 5 January 2006 in Mecca, Saudi Arabia where pilgrims had gathered in preparation for the annual Hajj pilgrimage. The collapse of the four-storey hostel housing pilgrims killed 76 people and injured 62.

== Hostel ==
The hostel, Lulu'at al-Khair, situated on al-Ghazal Street, just 60 metres (200 ft) from the walls of Masjid al-Haram, was in demand as the Hajj was about to begin, and at least 30 pilgrims were known to be staying there. As well as housing pilgrims, the building also contains a restaurant and shops. At its base it is surrounded by market stalls. The building was at least 25 years old and its operator, Habib Turkestani, claims that the building was structurally sound and in "good shape".

== Collapse ==
According to reports, prior to the collapse a fire was seen spreading downstairs in the building. The fire alarm went off and sprinklers were in operation. The building was not fully occupied at the time, as many of the occupants had made their way to the Masjid al Haram for mid-day Salat. As soon as the collapse happened, nearby people began to try to remove the rubble. Up to 1,000 Saudi rescue workers were dispatched, and two large cranes were brought in to try to clear the masonry. People in buildings nearby were evacuated as a precaution.

== Victims ==
Originally, the Saudi government declared that 13 people had died, but this figure quickly rose, settling at 76. Most of those who died were passers-by, people shopping in the markets or returning from the Masjid al Haram after Salat. Most were foreign nationals from Arab and Asian nations. The dead were buried in the Jannatul Mualla cemetery in Mecca, where Muslims believe Muhammad's sahaba will rise again on the Day of Judgement.

== See also ==
- Incidents during the Hajj
