= Favelle Favco Group =

Manufacturer of construction cranes

Favelle Favco Berhad
- Company type: Public limited company
- Traded as: MYX: 7229
- ISIN: MYL7229OO007
- Founders: Eric Favelle; Edward Arthur Favelle; Edward Hastings Favelle; Harry Cole
- Headquarters: Lot 586, Jalan Batu Tiga Lama, 41300 Klang, Selangor, Malaysia
- Website: favellefavco.com

Favelle Favco Berhad (MYX: 7229) is a manufacturer of construction cranes under the brands Favelle Favco and Kroll. The company's main plant is based at Senawang, Malaysia, with production facilities and engineering offices also located in Sydney, China, Texas and Denmark.

The company's shares are traded on the Main Board of Bursa Malaysia, formerly known as the Kuala Lumpur Stock Exchange. It is partially owned by Muhibbah Engineering.

In 2012, its market capitalization was RM250 million, sales averaged RM490 million annually, and profits were RM29 million over the last five years. In 2013, annual revenue for the company was approximately RM764 million, with profits of just under RM65 million. In October 2014, its market capitalization was around RM700 million.

== Company history ==
Muhibbah Engineering acquired Favelle Favco in 1995.

== Products ==
The company produces offshore cranes with lift capacities of up to 1,000 tonnes. In July 2013, RHB Research reported that 85% of Favelle Favco's 2013 year-to-date crane orders were offshore cranes.

The company also specializes in tower cranes that can lift heavy loads quickly, with the Favelle Favco M760's top lift speed at 160 metres (520 ft) per minute. Its cranes were used to construct some of the tallest skyscrapers ever built, including the World Trade Center in New York and its replacement, One World Trade Center, as well as the Burj Khalifa, Taipei 101, the Petronas Twin Towers, and the Shanghai World Financial Centre.

Favco has built the world's largest tower crane, nicknamed "Tinkerbell", which is capable of lifting up to 330 tonnes.
