= Krøll Cranes =

Danish crane manufacturer

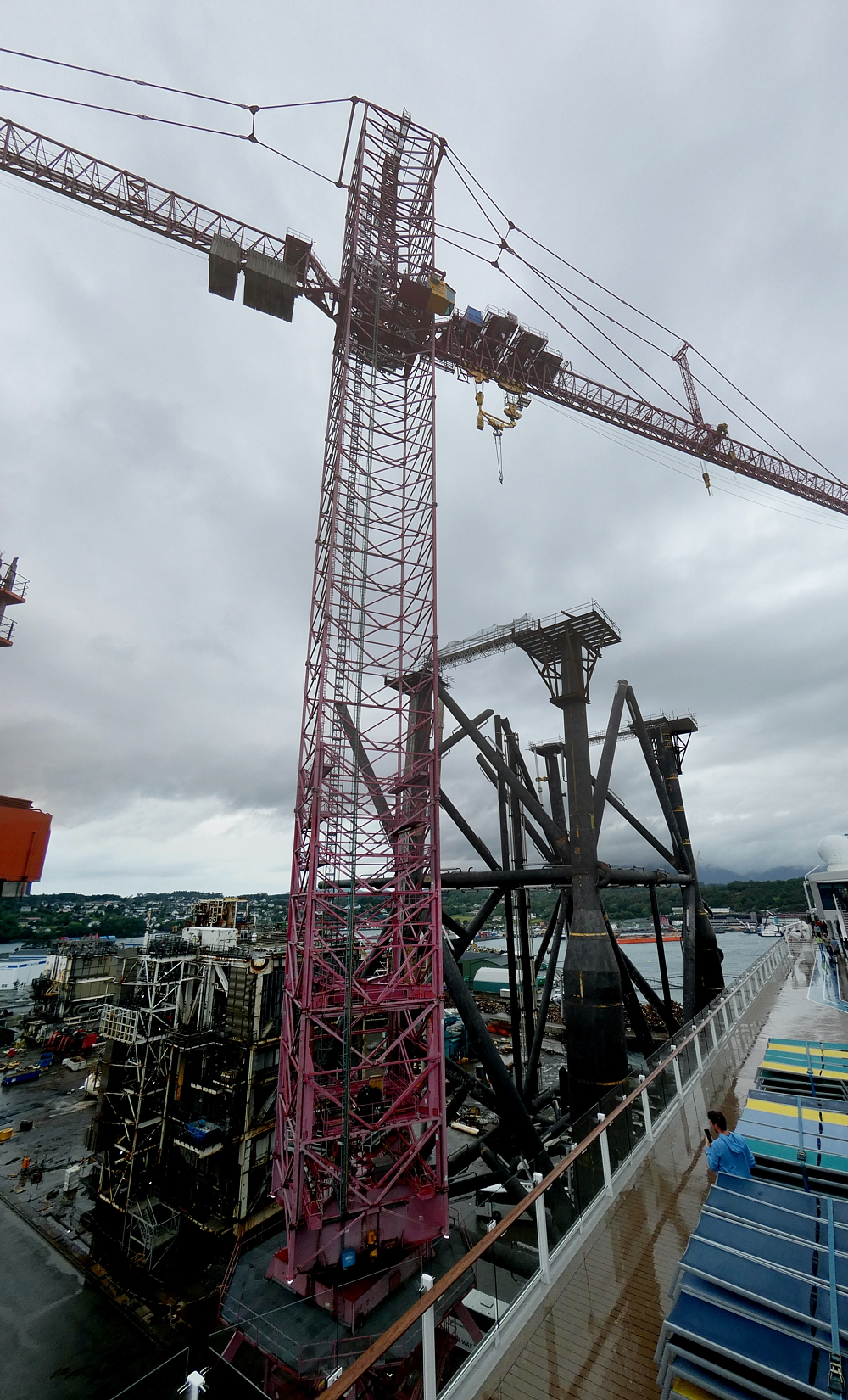
Krøll giant crane loading appr. 100 t within a range of 100 m

Krøll Cranes A/S is a Danish company located in Copenhagen and specializing in crane manufacturing, particularly tower cranes. The company has existed since the mid-1950s.

== Brief overview ==
The company started out as a licensed manufacturer of the Linden Comansa America (LCA) tower cranes. With time, the company started to produce cranes of its own design which were very competitive with the LCA cranes. By mid 1970s Krøll became very popular in North America and Northern Europe. By 1980 the company joined the Vølund Concern. By mid 1980s its crane market expanded into the Soviet Union and Krøll's crane were widely used in building of nuclear power plants in the USSR as well as in the United States. The Chernobyl disaster brought downturn in the Krøll's cranes demand.

Today the company is part of the Muhibbah Engineering Group.
