= Professional life of George W. Bush =

Prior to his election as president in 2000, George W. Bush held other positions including being an oil executive, an owner of the Texas Rangers baseball team, and the governor of Texas.

== Business ==
Bush began his industry career in 1977, when he established Arbusto Energy, an oil and gas exploration company he financed with his education trust fund surplus and money from other investors, including Dorothy Bush, Lewis Lehrman, William Henry Draper III, Bill Gammell, and James R. Bath, the last of whom represented Salem bin Laden, a half-brother and cousin of Osama bin Laden. In 1984, Bush sold the company, heavily damaged due to the 1979 energy crisis, to Spectrum 7, another Texas gas exploration firm. Under the terms of the sale, Bush became CEO. Spectrum 7 lost revenue and was merged into Harken Energy Corporation in 1986, with Bush becoming a director of Harken.

=== Texas Rangers and allegations of insider trading ===
After working on his father's successful 1988 presidential campaign, Bush learned from fellow Yale alumnus William DeWitt, Jr., that family friend Eddie Chiles wanted to sell the Texas Rangers baseball franchise along with the new sports stadium; built on land acquired under eminent domain law and built under funding financed through taxpayers' funds backed by a bond issued for its debt. In April 1989, Bush assembled a group of investors from his father's close friends, including fellow fraternity brother Roland W. Betts; the group bought an 86% share of the Rangers for $75 million. Bush received a 2% share by investing $606,302, of which $500,000 was a bank loan. Against the advice of his counsel, Bush repaid the loan by selling $848,000 worth of stock in Harken Energy. Harken reported significant financial losses within a year of this sale, triggering allegations of insider trading. On March 27, 1992, the Securities and Exchange Commission concluded that Bush had a "preexisting plan" to sell, that Bush had a "relatively limited role in Harken management", and that it had not seen evidence of insider trading.

The subsequent SEC investigation ended in 1992 with a memo stating "it appears that Bush did not engage in illegal insider trading," but noted that the memo "must in no way be construed as indicating that the party has been exonerated or that no action may ultimately result".

Critics allege that this decision was strongly influenced by the makeup of the SEC at the time, which heavily favored Bush. The chairman at the time was Richard Breeden, a good friend of the Bush family's who had been nominated to the SEC by President George H. W. Bush and who had been a lawyer in James Baker's firm, Baker Botts. The SEC's general counsel at the time was James Doty, who had been appointed by President H.W. Bush and as a lawyer in James Baker's firm, Baker Botts had represented George W. Bush when arrangements were made to acquire the Texas Rangers baseball franchise (although Doty recused himself from the investigation.). With Baker Botts representing W. Bush, the Saudi BinLaden family, and W. Bush's funding conduit James R. Bath, Doty was involved in the frivolous litigation campaign launched in the attempt to intimidate BinLaden middleman James R Bath's business partner Charles W. "Bill" White into cooperating with the attempted cover-up of secret BinLaden Family funding of W. Bush's campaigns and businesses. Bush's own lawyer was Robert Jordan, who had been "partners with both Doty and Breeden at Baker Botts and who later became George W. Bush's ambassador to Saudi Arabia".

In House of Bush, House of Saud, Craig Unger notes that at the time of Bush's sale, Harken Energy "was expected to run out of money in just three days" (p. 123). In a last-ditch attempt to save the company, Harken was advised by the endowment fund of Harvard University to spin off two of its lower-performing divisions. "According to a Harken memo, if the plan did not go through, the company had 'no other source of immediate financing.'" Bush had already taken out a $500,000 loan and sought Harken's general counsel for advice. The reply was explicit: "The act of trading, particularly if close in time to the receipt of the inside information, is strong evidence that the insider's investment decision was based on the inside information... the insider should be advised not to sell". This memo was turned over by Bush's attorney the day after the U.S. Securities and Exchange Commission (SEC) ruled that it would not charge Bush with insider trading. On June 22, Bush sold his 212,140 shares of stock anyway for a net profit of $848,560. The very next quarter, Harken announced losses of $23 million, which continued to the end of the year when the stock "plummeted from $4 to $1.25".

As President, Bush refused to authorize the SEC to release its full report on the Harken investigation. When the Rangers franchise was sold for $250 million in 1998, at a total profit of $170 million, Bush personally received $14.9 million for his $600,000 investment.

As managing general partner of the Rangers, Bush assisted the team's media relations and the construction of a new stadium. Many in Arlington protested that the stadium was paid for with public funds, and when the stadium title was given to the Texas Rangers Organization, it effectively allowed Bush to cash out public funds. His public role generated valuable goodwill and reinforced name recognition throughout Texas.

Prior to his gubernatorial campaign, Bush briefly considered a candidacy to become the Commissioner of Baseball in the early to mid-1990s.

=== Early political career ===
After a United States National Guard transfer in 1972, he served as political director for an Alabama senate campaign. In 1978, Bush ran for the U.S. House of Representatives but lost to Kent Hance. Bush stressed his energy credentials and conservative values in the campaign. Hance, however, also held many conservative views, opposing gun control and strict regulation; he successfully portrayed Bush as out of touch with rural Texans. Hance later became a Republican and donated money to Bush's campaign for Governor of Texas in 1993.
