= Arbusto Energy =

Former oil and gas exploration company

- Type: Oil and gas exploration firm
- Founded: 1977
- Founders: George W. Bush
- Defunct: 1984
- Fate: Merged with Spectrum 7 Energy Corp
- Headquarters: United States
- Area served: Texas

Arbusto Energy was an oil and gas exploration firm started in 1977 by former U.S. president George W. Bush. In 1984, the company merged with Spectrum 7 Energy Corp.

== History ==
Arbusto Energy was organized in 1977, but did not begin operations until after Bush's unsuccessful 1978 run for Representative from Texas's 19th congressional district. In March 1979, the company began raising funds for oil exploration through private offerings. In April 1982, Bush decided to begin offering public drilling partnerships, but had difficulty raising subscriptions. A change in the company name to Bush Exploration brought no improvement. With little success in its drilling program, the company merged with Spectrum 7 Energy Corp. in February 1984, with Bush holding the positions of Chairman and CEO. In 1986, a rapid fall in oil prices made investment in oil exploration unattractive, and put the company in financial difficulties. Spectrum 7 began looking for partners or purchasers, and in September of that year it was acquired by Harken Energy through a stock swap, with Bush joining the Harken board of directors.

From 1981–1986 the chief financial officer of Arbusto Energy was Mike Conaway. Conaway served as the U.S. representative for Texas's 11th congressional district from 2005–2021.

== Arbusto and James Bath ==
One of the early investors in Arbusto was Houston businessman James R. Bath. Bath and Bush became acquainted when both men were serving as reserve pilots in the Texas Air Guard in the early 1970s, and according to journalist Craig Unger, Bath invested $50,000 in Arbusto.

At the time of the investment, Bath was a representative for Saudi businessman Salem bin Laden, the oldest son of Mohammed bin Laden and the older brother of Osama bin Laden, founder of the Saudi Binladin Group, the largest oil construction company in Saudi Arabia. Bath's business partner Charles White later became involved in a legal dispute with Bath, during which he claimed that Bath had actually invested in the company on behalf of bin Laden and other Saudi businessmen. Both Bath and Bush have denied this, and according to journalist Craig Unger, who examined the relationship between the Bushes and Saudi financiers in his 2004 book House of Bush, House of Saud, and journalist Steve Coll, whose book The Bin Ladens: An Arabian Family in the American Century examines the family's history, there is no evidence to support the claim.

== See also ==
- Professional life of George W. Bush
