= Mark Lombardi =

American neo-conceptual artist (1951–2000)

- Born: March 23, 1951; Syracuse, New York
- Died: March 22, 2000 (aged 48); New York, New York
- Education: Syracuse University
- Occupation: Artist

Mark Lombardi (March 23, 1951 – March 22, 2000) was an American neo-conceptual artist who specialized in drawings that document alleged financial and political frauds by power brokers, and in general "the uses and abuses of power".

== Education and early career ==
Lombardi was born in the town of Manlius, New York, just outside Syracuse, New York. He majored in art history at Syracuse University, and graduated with a B.A in 1974. While still an undergraduate, Lombardi had a job as chief researcher for a 1973 art exhibit Teapot Dome to Watergate – a multimedia collage, all of whose elements focused on various US governmental scandals; it was motivated by the then-ongoing Watergate scandal. In 1975, James Harithas (the former director of the Syracusan Everson Museum) hired Lombardi to be an assistant curator at the Contemporary Arts Museum in Houston, Texas, where Harithas had become director. Lombardi worked there for approximately two years, until 1976. While in Houston, he also opened a small art gallery, "Square One". Then, he became a general reference librarian for the Fine Arts department in the Houston Public Library, started a regional artist archive, and wrote two books, one on the drug wars and another on the neglected and forgotten art genre of panoramas. During this time, Lombardi was also an abstract painter of no particular note; he pursued painting as a hobby during his actual career as an archivist and reference librarian.

== Late career ==
Six years before his death, Lombardi switched to link analysis pencil diagrams of crime and conspiracy networks that he would become best known for. In the early 1990s, he began researching the many scandals of the time, including the BCCI scandal, the Harken Energy scandal, and the Savings and Loan scandal. The thousands (roughly 14500) of index cards that he accumulated in the course of this research began to overwhelm his ability to deal with them, and to cope, Mark began assembling them into physical outlines, and then into hand-written diagrams. These were intended to be a tool, to provide focus to his work, but he "...soon decided that this method of combining text and image in a single field (called a drawing, diagram or flow chart, whichever you prefer) really worked for me in other ways as well." This decision was spurred, according to Lombardi, while he was talking with a friend about one of the participants in the Iran–Contra scandal, Adnan Khashoggi. Regarding this conversation, Lombardi wrote "I began taking notes, then sketching out a simple tree chart, showing the breakdown of Khashoggi's American holdings. Within days, I began making more of these charts, depicting other corporate networks I had researched. I was writing several pieces at the time and found the charts a useful, quick reference to the material at hand."

Initially, as the subject of one of his manuscripts, the primary focus was on the drug wars, but because of Pete Brewton's January 1990 newspaper series about the Houston S&L scandal, in which Brewton alleged that the Bush family, CIA members, and Mafia members took part in a de facto conspiracy to steal vast sums of money, Lombardi shifted his emphasis to investigating the laundering of the stolen money.

Lombardi divorced in October 1996, and moved to Williamsburg, Brooklyn at the urging of his friend Fred Tomaselli. There, he participated in a group show at the Drawing Center, called Selections: Winter 1997, followed by two solo art shows: Silent Partners, shown in November 1998 at Pierogi 2000 in Brooklyn, and Vicious Circles, a work drawing upon Jonathan Kwitny's book of the same name dealing with Mafia involvement in the legitimate commercial markets, shown in 1999 at the Devon Golden Gallery in Chelsea. Mark was included in Versus IV - a Willoughby Sharp curated group effort juxtaposing five American artists (including John Drury, Neil Frankl, Alan Skarritt and Duff Schweninger in addition to Lombardi) with eight Europeans in Torino, Italy - also in 1998, where two of his drawings including "Neil Bush and Silverado #2" (1996) were printed in the accompanying catalogue. He also participated in another group show, Greater New York: New Art in New York Now in February 2000 at the P.S. 1 art gallery.

In March 2000, on the day before his death, Lombardi moved all his work to Pierogi 2000. He then bolted his apartment from the inside and hanged himself, on the day before his birthday and three years after he had moved to Williamsburg.

== Works ==
Cover art for Mark Lombardi: Global Networks. The cover reproduces a detail from Lombardi's "George W. Bush, Harken Energy and Jackson Stephens, ca 1979–90".

Lombardi called his diagrams Narrative Structures. They are structurally similar to sociograms – a type of graph drawing used in the field of social network analysis, and to a lesser degree by earlier artists like Hans Haacke. Other important influences on Lombardi were philosopher Herbert Marcuse, and visualization expert Edward Tufte.

"On October 17, 2001, five weeks after the terrorist attacks on the World Trade Center...an FBI agent contacted the Whitney Museum of American Art....to obtain a reproduction of Mark Lombardi's large drawing BCCI-ICIC & FAB, 1972-1991 (4th Version) or, if that were not possible, to see the actual work at the museum. At about the same time, Lombardi's gallery, Pierogi, also received a telephone inquiry from a 'lead investigator into the September 11th attacks.' Federal investigators wanted to obtain information pertaining to wealthy Saudi Arabian terrorist Osama Bin Laden and his Al Qaeda network by tracing his many financial connections...[to] BCCI," Robert Hobbs writes in his introduction to Global Networks. Hobbes continues: "If government investigators had merely decided to include select members of the art world in their investigation in the 9/11 attacks, that fact alone would have been newsworthy. But when an F.B.I. agent consulted a work of art for clues pertaining to terrorist financing, she unwittingly made history."

In Lombardi's historical diagrams, each node or connection was drawn from news stories from reputable media organizations, and his drawings document the purported financial and political frauds by power brokers.

According to Hobbs: "Certain things that are listed in the drawing are in red. These represent court judgments, actual dollar amounts. That is verifiable information. And I think that Lombardi himself realized that not everything could be verified. So I think what you have instead is names. We know about connections of names. Exactly what is that connection is hard to characterize. So that is a line with an arrow in one direction, or an arrow in two directions. So it's really the abstract component of the work of art. It's what can be represented, and – really – what cannot be represented."

For instance, his 1999 drawing "George W. Bush, Harken Energy, and Jackson Stephens, ca 1979–90" shows alleged connections between James Bath, the Bush and bin Laden families, and business deals in Texas and around the world. Following Lombardi's suicide in 2000, the book Mark Lombardi: Global Networks was written in conjunction with a traveling exhibit. The editors chose to incorporate into the cover artwork (see image at right) a detail from "George W. Bush, Harken Energy, and Jackson Stephens, ca 1979–90", showing George W. Bush (on the back cover of the book) and Osama bin Laden (in the upper left of the front cover) separated by one step from each other in the network, via Bath; the same connection between Bush and bin Laden was also highlighted in a 2003 Boston Globe article that described the FBI's interest in Lombardi's works immediately following the September 11 attacks of 2001. Lombardi's diagrams map the illicit flow of capital, amounting to a creative form of story-telling or, arguably, financial true crime.

Other subjects that interested Lombardi and were covered in his works include:

- Chicago Outfit
- Meyer Lansky
- The P2 conspiracy, Michele Sindona, Roberto Calvi
- World Finance Corporation
- Nugan Hand Ltd.
- Gerald Bull, Project Babylon, Space Research Corporation
- Iran–Contra, Lake Resources of Panama and Oliver North
- Global International Airways and the Indian Springs State Bank
- The Banca Nazionale del Lavoro, Ronald Reagan, Margaret Thatcher, and the arming of Saddam Hussein
- Charles Keating, Lincoln Savings (a subsidiary of American Continental Corporation)
- BCCI and ICIC
- Harken Energy Scandal, George W. Bush, James R. Bath, and Jackson T. Stephens
- Hans Kopp, Shakarchi Trading AG
- United Press International, and its attempted takeover by Pat Robertson with the aid of Beurt SerVaas.
- Jackson T. Stephens, the Lippo Group, and Bill Clinton; also, Clinton, the Lippo Group, and China Ocean Shipping Co.

== Posthumous exhibits ==
A major exhibit of Lombardi's art, "Mark Lombardi: Global Networks," was organized by Independent Curators International and curated by Robert Hobbs. The exhibit traveled to nine museums over 2003–2005, and has been the subject of several reviews. The exhibit catalog was published by Independent Curators in 2003.

Several of Lombardi's works were included in a 2010 show, NineteenEightyFour, hosted by the Austrian Cultural Forum New York. A re-exhibition of his work was held at the Pierogi Gallery in 2011 which, in addition to his drawings, included his bookshelf and a vitrine displaying some of his reference materials, as well as a 1996 video of Lombardi interviewed by Andy Mann.

20 of Lombardi's drawings are in the permanent collection of MoMA. Another 10 of his drawings are at the Whitney Museum of American Art, and were the subject of an FBI investigation after the September 11 attacks in 2001.

In 2012, German director Mareike Wegener released a documentary on Lombardi, entitled Mark Lombardi: Death-Defying Acts Of Art And Conspiracy. The movie premiered in May 2012 in Germany and the Brooklyn Film Festival, and then opened in September at MoMA in New York. Reviewers of the movie suggested that, unlike Lombardi's own work, it relies too much on innuendo and too little on factual information, and that it focuses too much on testimonials from friends and does not adequately explain the impact of Lombardi's art.
