= Barbara Probst =

German contemporary artist (born 1964)

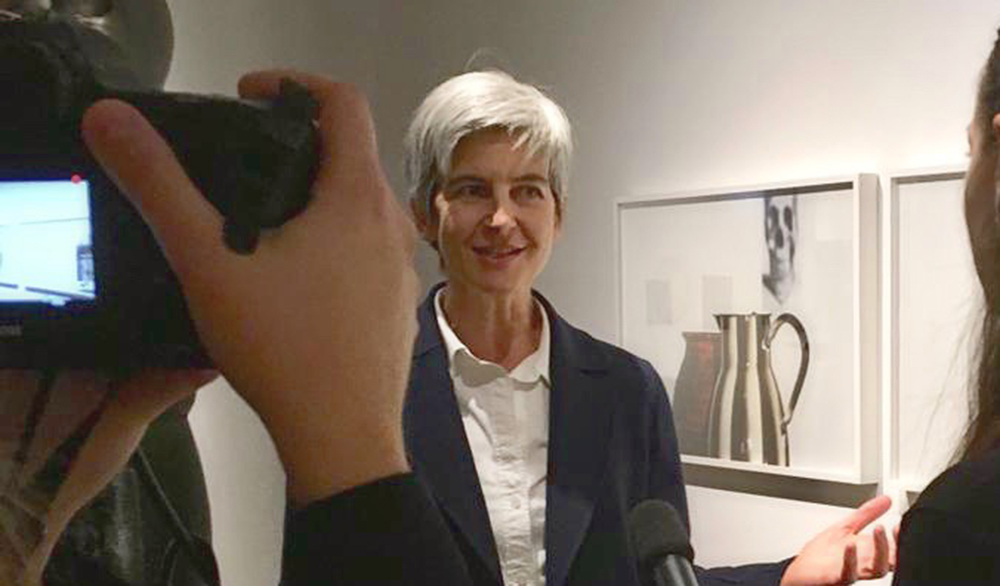
- Barbara Probst at the opening of "still life, obstinacy of things" at Kunsthaus Wien
- Born: 1964 (age 61–62); Munich, Germany
- Education: Academy of Fine Arts, Munich, Kunstakademie Düsseldorf
- Known for: Photography
- Movement: Contemporary Art

Barbara Probst (born 1964) is a German contemporary artist whose photographic work consists of multiple images of a single scene, shot simultaneously with several cameras via a radio-controlled system. Using a mix of color and black-and-white film, she poses her subjects, positioning each lens at a different angle, and then triggers the cameras' shutters all at once, creating tableaux of two or more individually framed images. Although the pictures are of the same subject and are taken at the same instant, they provide a range of perspectives. She lives and works in both New York City and Munich. She relocated to New York City in 1997.

== Early life and education ==
Probst was born in Munich. She studied at the Academy of Fine Arts, Munich (Akademie der Bildenden Künste, München) and Kunstakademie Düsseldorf in Germany.

== Work ==
Probst experiments with the temporality and point of view of the shot/counter-shot technique of film by presenting multiple photographs of one scene shot simultaneously with several cameras via a radio-controlled release system. As a result, the subject of the work becomes the photographic moment of exposure itself.

"Barbara Probst investigates the many ambiguities inherent to the photographic image. In her work the relationship of the photographic instant to reality is intensified in two distinct ways whereby the captured moment acquires an almost unsettling quality: on the one hand, Barbara Probst abandons the single-eye gaze of the camera and divides it into various points of view. On the other, she multiplies and diversifies the short moment of the shot. Thanks to a radio-controlled release system she can simultaneously trigger the shutters of several cameras pointed at the same event or subject from different angles and various distances. The depictions of each specific instant generated by this method constitute a series. The relationship of single shots to one another within a series is not determined by a common unifying principle or any stylistic markers. There is no formal proximity and no overall theme to tie the works together. Yet the photographs are bound by a tighter but still elusive link, namely the one and only moment of an exposure which is their very subject."

— Stefan Schessl, "Back to the Beginning", Barbara Probst – Exposures (2002)

Using a radio-controlled release system, or multiple photographers, she simultaneously triggers the shutters of several cameras pointed at the same scene from various viewpoints. The resulting sequences of images suspend time and stretch out the split second. Artistic Director and Publisher of Camera Austria Reinhard Braun writes of this saying:

"Barbara Probst embroils us in different possible interpretations; particularly by apparently focusing on a specific moment in time in the various series, she directs our attention to the time before or after, diverting it away from the meaning of this empictured moment and to the construction of a duration that actually creates the meaning of the action or scene, i.e. that does not give us anything to see but something to think about."

— Reinhard Braun, "An Exposure of Photography: Barbara Probst’s Exposures", Camera Austria International #85 (2004)

Moreover, Probst employs backdrops, often enlarged stills from well-known movies or landscapes. This enhances the sense of artifice by presenting multiple locations within the same moment. Furthermore, equipment such as cameras, studio lights, tripods are visible in the crossfire of images. These including the photographer(s) themselves become subjects of the moment.

Artforum Critic Brian Scholis asserts her work disregards photography's standard concept of "decisive moment," and instead references cinema's practice of multiple cameras to create movement and diversion in a "Rashomon-like multiplicity of perspectives".

== Selected solo exhibitions ==
- 2024 Kunstmuseum Luzern, Switzerland
- 2019 Le Bal, Paris, France
- 2014 Galerie Rudolfinum, Prague, Czechia
- 2014 Centre PasquArt, Biel, Switzerland
- 2013 National Museum of Photography, Copenhagen, Denmark
- 2009 Oldenburger Kunstverein, Oldenburg, Germany
- 2009 Stills Gallery, Edinburgh, Scotland
- 2008 Domaine de Kerguehennec, Bignan, France
- 2008 Madison Museum of Contemporary Art, Madison, WI
- 2007 Museum of Contemporary Photography, Chicago, IL

== Selected group exhibitions ==
- 2015 Perfect Likeness: Photography and Composition, Hammer Museum, Los Angeles, CA
- 2015 Eyes on the Street, Cincinnati Art Museum, Cincinnati, OH
- 2014 (Mis)Understanding Photography: Works and Manifestos, Museum Folkwang, Essen, Germany
- 2014 Per Speculum Me Video at Frankfurter Kunstverein, Frankfurt am Main, Germany
- 2014 Lost Places. Sites of Photography, Hamburger Kunsthalle, Hamburg, Germany
- 2011 elles@pompidou at the Centre Pompidou, Paris, France
- 2010 Mixed Use, Manhattan, Photography and Related Practices 1970s to the present, curated by curated by Lynne Cooke and Douglas Crimp, Museo Nacional Centro de Arte Reina Sofía, Madrid Spain
- 2010 to 2012 Exposed: Voyeurism, Surveillance and the Camera
  - Tate Modern, London, UK
  - San Francisco Museum of Modern Art, San Francisco, CA
  - Walker Art Center, Minneapolis, MN
- 2006 New Photography, Museum of Modern Art, New York, NY

== Collections ==
- Centre Pompidou, Paris, France
- Folkwang Museum, Essen, Germany
- Galleria Nazionale d'Arte Moderna, Rome, Italy
- Lenbachhaus, Munich, Germany
- Los Angeles County Museum of Art, Los Angeles, CA
- Museo Cantonale d'Arte, Lugano, Switzerland
- Museum of Contemporary Art, Chicago, IL
- Museum of Contemporary Photography, Chicago, IL
- Museum of Fine Arts, Houston, TX
- Museum of Modern Art, New York, NY
- National Gallery of Canada, Ottawa, Canada
- Pinakothek der Moderne, Munich, Germany
- San Francisco Museum of Modern Art, San Francisco, CA
- Vancouver Art Gallery, Vancouver BC, Canada
- Whitney Museum of American Art, New York, NY

== Editorial work and fashion campaigns ==
- 2019 Vogue Italia editorial, January
- 2018 Wallpaper, July
- 2018 Modern Matter, Autumn/Winter
- 2018 Garage, September
- 2017 Marni, Spring/Summer
- 2017 Vogue Italia, July

== Selected monographs ==
- 2024 Barbara Probst. Subjective Evidence, published Hartmann Projects, edited by Kunstmuseum Luzern und FotoFocus/Contemporary Arts Center Cincinnati, with texts by Stefan Gronert, Fanni Fetzer, Kevin Moore, Hartmann Books, Stuttgart 2024
- 2019 The Moment in Space, published by Le Bal, Paris and Hartmann Projects, with an essay by Frederic Paul
- 2017 12 Moments, published by Editions Xavier Barral, with an essay by Robert Hobbs
- 2016 12 Moments, published by Hartmann Projects, with an essay by Robert Hobbs
- 2013 Barbara Probst, published by Hatje Cantz, Germany, with texts by Felicity Lunn, Jens Erdman Rasmussen, and Lynne Tillman, and an interview with the artist by Frédéric Paul
- 2008 Barbara Probst – Exposures, published by Steidl, Germany and the Museum of Contemporary Photography, Chicago, with an introduction by Karen Irvine, an interview with Johannes Meinhardt and an essay by David Bate
- 2002 Barbara Probst, published for exhibition at Cuxhavener Kunstverein, Cuxhaven, Germany, with an essay by Stefan Schessl
- 1998 Welcome, published for exhibition at Frankfurter Kunstverein, Munich, Germany, with an essay by Thomas Dreher
- 1998 Through The Looking Glass, published for exhibition at Anhaltische Gemäldegalerie Dessau, Dessau, Germany, with an essay by Thomas Dreher
- 1998 Barbara Probst, published for exhibition at Akademiegalerie, Munich Germany, with a short essay by Michael Hofstetter
- 1998 InExpectation, published for exhibition at Binder & Rid Gallery, Munich, Germany, with an essay by Thomas Dreher
- 1994 Barbara Probst, My Museum, published by Kulturreferat München, Munich, Germany
