= William DeWitt Jr. =

American businessman

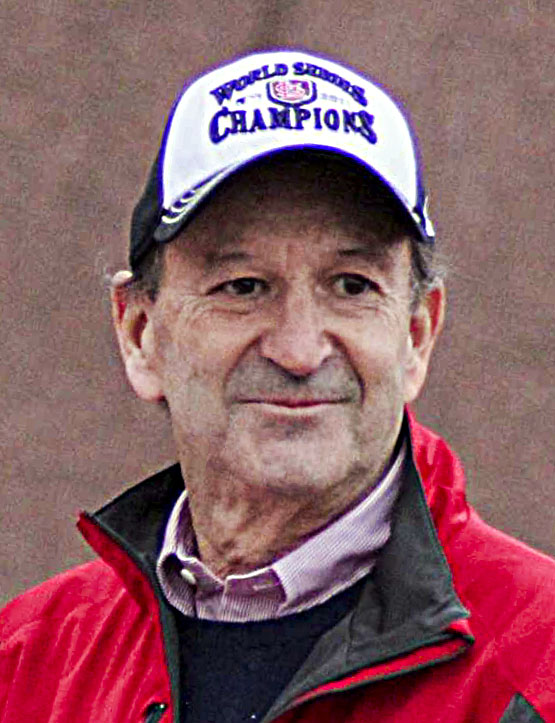
- DeWitt at the 2011 World Series parade
- Born: August 31, 1941 (age 85); St. Louis, Missouri, U.S.
- Education: Yale University; Harvard Business School
- Employer: St. Louis Cardinals
- Known for: Chairman of the St. Louis Cardinals
- Title: Managing partner and chairman
- Spouse: Katharine Cramer
- Children: 4
- Parent(s): William DeWitt Sr. and Margaret H. DeWitt

William Orville DeWitt Jr. (born August 31, 1941) is an American businessman who is currently the principal owner, managing partner and chairman of the St. Louis Cardinals, a professional baseball franchise which competes in Major League Baseball (MLB). The Cardinals have won two World Series — in 2006 and 2011 — during DeWitt's time as owner. In addition to the Cardinals, DeWitt has also owned or invested in the Cincinnati Stingers hockey club, Baltimore Orioles, the Cincinnati Reds and the Texas Rangers. Business interests outside baseball include Reynolds, DeWitt & Co., which owns Arby's franchises and invests in the U.S. Playing Card Company and the petroleum company Spectrum 7.

== Early life ==
DeWitt, the son of longtime Major League Baseball executive Bill DeWitt and Margaret H. DeWitt, was born in St. Louis, Missouri, where he attended St. Louis Country Day School. He was around baseball constantly as a child; his father owned the St. Louis Browns and Cincinnati Reds, and DeWitt served as a Browns batboy. On August 19, 1951, the little person Eddie Gaedel served as a pinch hitter at a Browns game, wearing DeWitt's jersey to the plate. He earned a bachelor's degree from Yale University in economics in 1963 and an M.B.A. from Harvard University in 1965.

== Early business ventures (1966–95) ==
DeWitt was part of an investment group led by Francis L. Dale that purchased the Cincinnati Reds for $8 million from his father, Bill Sr., on December 5, 1966.

DeWitt joined Cincinnati investment firm Gradison & Co. in 1974. In 1979, along with Mercer Reynolds, he founded the investment firm Reynolds, DeWitt & Co. The firm owns 63 Arby's franchises, whose value has been estimated at $50.4 million and is an investor in Cincinnati-based U.S. Playing Card Company, with an estimated value of about $120 million. It also holds a $40 million stake in Newport Aquarium in Newport, Kentucky. DeWitt is also involved with DeWitt Capital Group, a private equity firm registered in 2012. DeWitt has been part owner of the Cincinnati Reds and the Baltimore Orioles.

In 1984, one of DeWitt's business ventures, the oil company Spectrum 7, bought George W. Bush's Arbusto Energy, which, in turn, merged with Harken Energy in 1986. When Eddie Chiles prepared to sell the Texas Rangers baseball franchise in 1989, DeWitt and Bush gathered investors to buy the team.

DeWitt has also held shares in the National Football League's Cincinnati Bengals and the former Cincinnati Stingers of the World Hockey Association.

DeWitt was part owner of the Riverfront Coliseum in Cincinnati on December 3, 1979, when 11 people were killed prior to a concert by The Who.

== St. Louis Cardinals (1995–present) ==
In 1995, DeWitt and Stephen F. Brauer purchased the St. Louis Cardinals from Anheuser-Busch for $150 million. He oversees all league, financial, operational and baseball affairs for the club. Since DeWitt bought the team, the Cardinals have won two World Series (2006 and 2011), four National League pennants, 11 division titles, and have made 15 total playoff appearances. Forbes estimated that the team was worth $1.4 billion in 2014 and $2.1 billion in July 2019. The Cardinals are one of the largest privately held firms in St. Louis, bringing in an estimated $233 million in revenue in 2012.

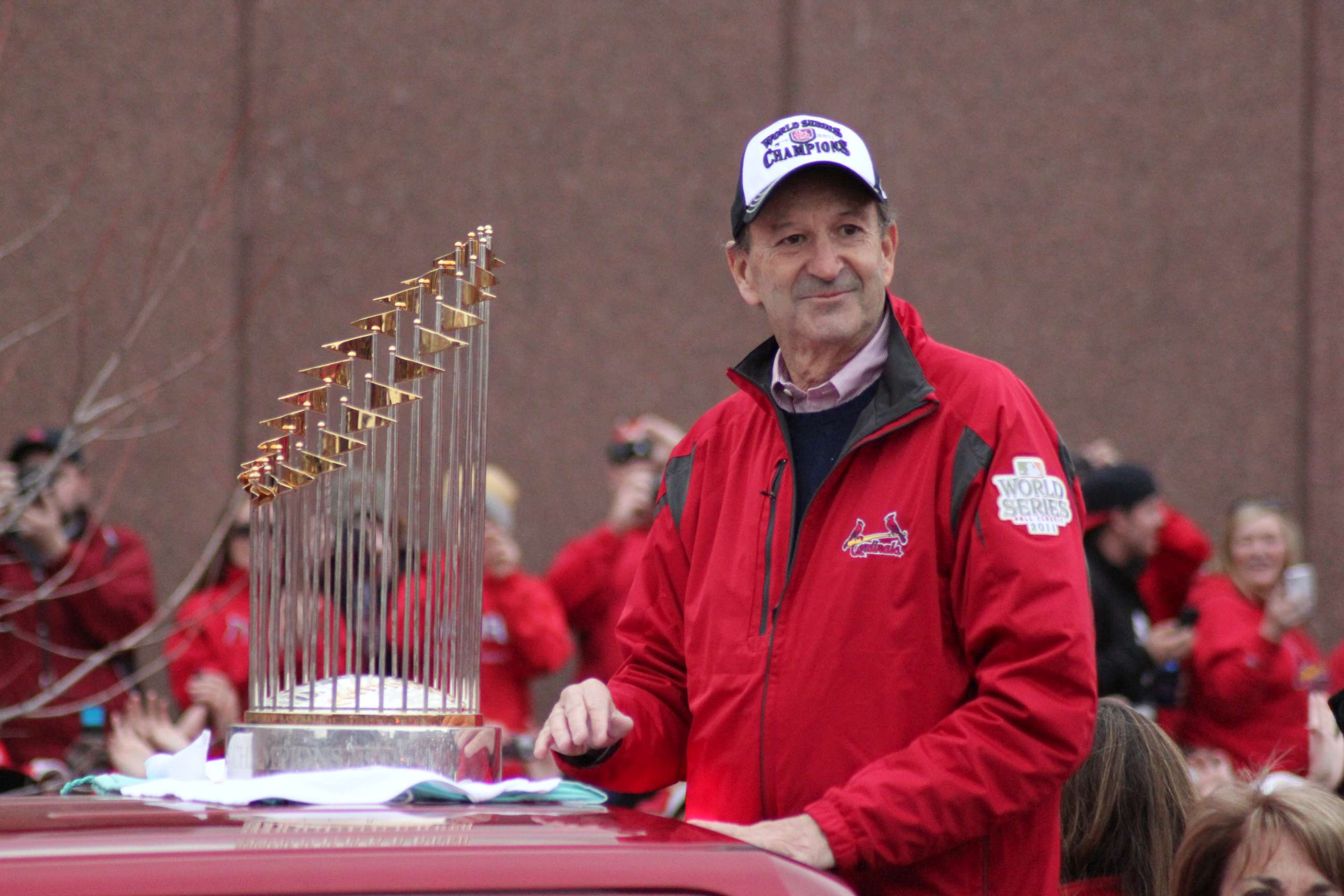
DeWitt during the 2011 World Series Parade.

In 1997, DeWitt established Cardinals Care, a nonprofit organization that builds baseball fields, helps youth baseball programs, and awards grants to children's boards. Through January 2017, Cardinals Care had distributed some $900,000 a year. As of 2013, the organization has built 18 baseball fields in the Greater St. Louis area. Since 2004, the organization has run Redbird Rookies, a network of 20 leagues for nearly 4,500 children around Greater St. Louis and in rural sections of Missouri and Illinois. who would not otherwise have the opportunity. It provides equipment and other necessities to the players, training for coaches and organizers, and workshops for parents.

The Cardinals have purchased three of their minor league affiliates since the DeWitt group took over. In 1998, DeWitt purchased the Palm Beach Cardinals of the Florida State League (minor league A-ball) and, in 2005, the Springfield Cardinals of the Texas League (AA). As of April 2013, the team had negotiated to purchase the Memphis Redbirds of the Pacific Coast League (AAA) from the Memphis Redbirds Foundation (MRF), a local non-profit entity. However, talks went on hold due to defaulted bonds on the building of AutoZone Park. On November 16, 2013, the Cardinals announced a resolution to purchase the team while the city purchased the stadium. The Cardinals agreed to lease the stadium from the city while Memphis will upgrade the park. In 2013, Forbes listed the Redbirds as one of the ten most valuable minor league franchises.

To expand the Cardinals' international presence, DeWitt opened baseball academies in the Dominican Republic and placed representatives in six foreign countries.

In 2006, the Cardinals moved from their old home, Busch Memorial Stadium, to Busch Stadium in 2006. The $365 million stadium is one of the few majority-privately funded MLB stadiums, along with the San Francisco Giants' Oracle Park and the Los Angeles Dodgers' Dodger Stadium. Busch Stadium cost $45 million (12%) in a long-term loan from St. Louis County, while, by comparison the Milwaukee Brewers' American Family Field ended up drawing 77.5% in public funding.

In conjunction with opening the new Busch Stadium, a mixed-use retail, entertainment, hotel, residential and office space known as Ballpark Village was planned for development adjacent to Busch Stadium. However, several years of delays postponed the groundbreaking and construction until spring of 2013.

In 2009, the Cardinals hosted the All-Star Game.

DeWitt began emphasizing developing talent as much as possible through the minor leagues, rather than relying mainly on free agents. Seventeen of the 25 players on the Cardinals' 2011 World Series roster were Cardinals' draftees.

In January 2014, the city of Memphis cleared the Cardinals to purchase the Memphis Redbirds from the MRF. Ballpark Village construction was completed and it opened in March 2014. The Cardinals also announced the rechristening of the team Hall of Fame Museum, with an annual selection process commencing in 2015. Twenty-two former Cardinals players and personnel were announced for induction into the Hall of Fame for the inaugural class of 2014. Closed since 2008, when the International Bowling Hall of Fame moved to Texas, this reincarnation of the museum is located in the newly constructed Ballpark Village within the same building as the Cardinal Nation Restaurant.

The Cardinals' value exceeded $1 billion for the first time in 2015 when Forbes appraised the Cardinals outright at $1.4 billion, making them the 27th-most valuable sports franchise in the world, and sixth-principal franchise in Major League Baseball (MLB). It was an increase from an $800 million pricing and eighth in the echelon in 2014. Their revenue was $294 million while their operating income was $73.6 million, and their overall assessment was approximately $200 million higher than the MLB average of $1.2 billion. Mike Ozanian of Forbes remarked that the Cardinals were "baseball's biggest anomaly", with outsize value outpacing their status as one of baseball's "smallest markets", and Ballpark Village was a popular destination for dining and entertainment. The Cardinals' local television ratings (7.76) graded the highest among all major league teams.

Reports surfaced on June 16, 2015, that the Federal Bureau of Investigation (FBI) were reviewing an alleged incident involving Cardinals' front office officials hacking into the Houston Astros' database of players, scouting reports and proprietary statistics. It was regarded as the first known case of corporate espionage involving computer network hacking in professional sports.

On September 19, 2015, the Cardinals became the first team in MLB to clinch a playoff spot that season. It also extended a franchise record of five consecutive seasons of reaching the postseason, a record which the club had set in 2014.

DeWitt has had votes in the Contemporary Baseball Committee in 2011-13, 2016–19, 2022, and 2024.

== Political activities ==
In 2003, President George W. Bush appointed DeWitt to be on the President's Intelligence Advisory Board and tapped his wife, Kathy, to serve on the National Endowment for the Arts.

== Personal life ==
DeWitt and his wife, Katharine "Kathy" Cramer DeWitt, live in Indian Hill, Ohio. They have four children, Katie, Bill, Andrew, and Margot and twelve grandchildren. Bill DeWitt III is the president of the Cardinals. Andrew E. DeWitt is the founder and CEO of Dewey's Pizza.

== See also ==
- List of St. Louis Cardinals owners and executives
