= Guillermo Hernandez =

Guillermo Hernandez can refer to

- Willie Hernández (1954–2023), Puerto Rican baseball player
- Guillermo Hernández-Cartaya (born 1932), banker
- Guillermo Hernandez (tennis), Filipino tennis player
- Guillermo Hernández (footballer, born 1942), Mexican football defender
- Guillermo Hernández (footballer, born 1971), Mexican football manager and former defender
