= Acción de Lucha Anti-Petrola =

Formed in December 1999, Acción de Lucha Anti-Petrola (ADELA) is a Costa Rican grassroots environmental group created to oppose offshore oil exploration and drilling. Translated into English as "Anti-Petroleum Action," ADELA is named after a local indigenous woman who was "struggling to defend her culture and local environment against outside forces." ADELA initially consisted of 30 local citizen's groups ranging from farmers' organizations and the fisherman's union, to religious groups, small business owners, and marine biologists. ADELA now comprises over 100 local citizens' organizations. The various groups came together to form ADELA after becoming aware of the negative environmental impact of seismic reflection explorations being conducted by Harken Costa Rica Holdings in November 1999.

== Mission ==
The primary goal of ADELA is to effectuate a complete national moratorium on oil exploration. In carrying out its mission, ADLEA informs and educates both the Caribbean community and political actors about the environmental risks the oil industry poses for Costa Rica, as well as for the Caribbean generally. ADELA also works with members of local communities to promote sustainable development, and to develop more environmentally friendly energy practices and policies.

With little material resources, ADELA largely relied on the grassroots efforts of its own members until 2001. ADLEA was largely successful in its efforts, and managed to stage protests, voice their opinions over the radio, and even bring lawsuits in the Costa Rican national court. After recognizing that their message was not reaching the United States, home of the oil companies seeking to drill off the Costa Rican shoreline, ADELA contacted the Natural Resources Defense Council (NRDC) in early 2001. ADELA's cause received international exposure when the NDRC included the Talamanca tropical forest region in southern Costa Rica, in its BioGems initiative. ADELA also began to receive financial support, research, and legal resources from the following groups: NRDC, Environmental Law Alliance Worldwide, Global Response, Caribbean Conservation Corporation, Interamerican Association for Environmental Defense, International Fund for Animal Welfare, World Conservation Union, Forest Conservation Action Alerts, Environmental News Network, Project Underground, and Radio International Feminista.

== Talamanca and potential environmental damage ==
Much of the oil exploration to date has occurred in the 1,300-square-mile (3,400 km^{2}) region of Costa Rica known as Talamanca. Talamanca is recognized as being one of the richest marine ecosystems on the planet, and its mountainous terrain and tropical vegetation are considered to be equally rich. Due to its biological significance, Talamanca is protected as a UNESCO World Heritage Site. Talamanca is also home to three indigenous community reserves, the Cahuita National Park, and a UN-designated wetlands site at the Jairo Mora Sandoval Gandoca-Manzanillo Mixed Wildlife Refuge. In total, 88% of the Talamanca region has some level of environmental protection.

Talamanca's marine resources include coral reefs, mangroves, rare manatees, over 100 species of fish, and sea turtle nesting beaches. In fact, Costa Rica's Caribbean coast is a migratory pathway for at least three endangered species of sea turtles, and sea turtles are recognized as being especially susceptible to oil pollution.

Protection of the sea turtles is a primary concern for conservationists, but it is likely that mangroves and wetlands, generally, would not be able to recover from an oil spill. Oil pollution would also significantly impact the coastal communities and local economic infrastructure, as it would likely result in hundreds of fishing jobs being lost and a decrease in eco-tourism. Eco-tourism remains Costa Rica's primary source of revenue from other countries.

== Efforts to halt exploration and drilling by Harken Costa Rica Holdings ==
=== Background ===
In 1994, the Costa Rican legislature passed a Hydrocarbons Law which divided the country into 27 blocks for oil and natural gas exploration, and it allowed firms of foreign countries to bid for oil concessions. In July 1998, Costa Rican President Miguel Angel Rodriguex (1998–2002) granted one concession of four exploration blocks to MKJ Xploration Inc. (MKJ), a small Louisiana-based company. Located in Talamanca, the four blocks were to be used for the exploration and extraction of hydrocarbons.

In November 1998, Harken Energy Corporation (Harkan) of Dallas, Texas, purchased 40% of the concession rights from MKJ, and the two companies combined to create Harken Costa Rica Holdings (HCRH). In March 1999, Costa Rica's National Technical Environmental Secretariat (SETENA) approved an environmental impact study (EIA) submitted by HCRH to conduct marine seismic reflection blasting.

Between October and December 1999, HCRH began using seismic reflection blasting to map possible oil reserves. Such blasting was in derogation of a condition in the EIA that restricted blasting to the months of January and July, so as to minimize the impact on marine life. The blasting significantly disrupted the local Costa Rican fishing industry. ADELA formed in December 1999 to oppose the actions of HCRH.

=== Efforts of ADELA ===
In January 2000, ADELA was a party in a lawsuit seeking an injunction and annulment of the HCRH exploration concessions. In September of that year, the Costa Rican Constitutional Court ruled in ADELA's favor, and granted an annulment of the four-block HCRH concession. The Court's ruling was based on International Labor Organization Convention 169, "Concerning Indigenous and Tribal Peoples in Independent Countries," to which Costa Rica is bound. The Court later modified the ruling in November 2000, however, and nullified only those blocks affecting indigenous territory.

In September 2001, SETENA convened a public hearing in Limón to debate issues concerning oil development. HCHR bused in approximately 100 people who they paid to attend the hearing, yet they were outnumbered by ADELA members. More than 300 people are reported to have supported ADELA's campaign with banners and posters. In addition, marine biologists and environmental organizations who support ADELA gave presentations about various social, economic, and environmental adverse impacts that could result from oil exploration and drilling.

On February 28, 2002, SETENA rejected HCRH's EIA as not being environmentally or socially viable, and SETENA listed 50 reasons for its decision. HCRH's appeal was rejected by Elizabeth Odio, then-Costa Rican Minister of the Environment.

In 2005, the Costa Rican President notified HCHR that their contract had been terminated, due to HCHR's failure to obtain an approved EIA pursuant to Costa Rican environmental law.
