= Global International Airways =

US charter airline (1978–1985)

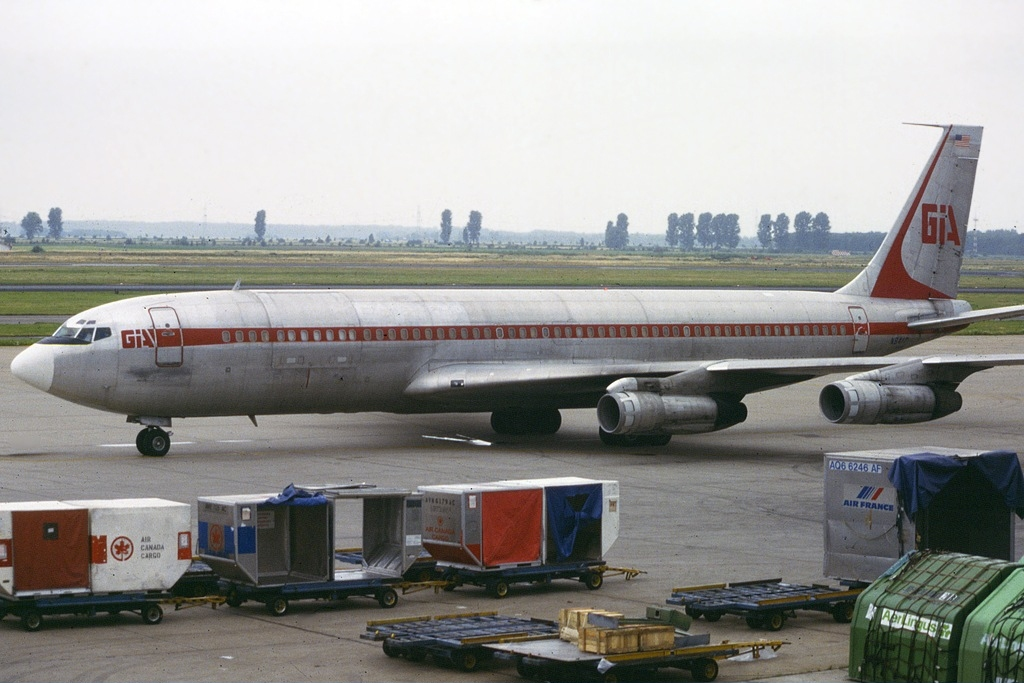
- Boeing 707 Düsseldorf July 1984 during the airline's second period of operation
IATA	ICAO	Call sign
GX	GAX	GLOBAL
- Founded: 30 December 1977
- Commenced operations: August 1978; 47 years ago
- Ceased operations: 1985; 41 years ago
- Operating bases: Kansas City, Missouri
- Fleet size: See Fleet below
- Headquarters: Kansas City, Missouri; United States
- Founder: Farhad Azima
- Employees: 900

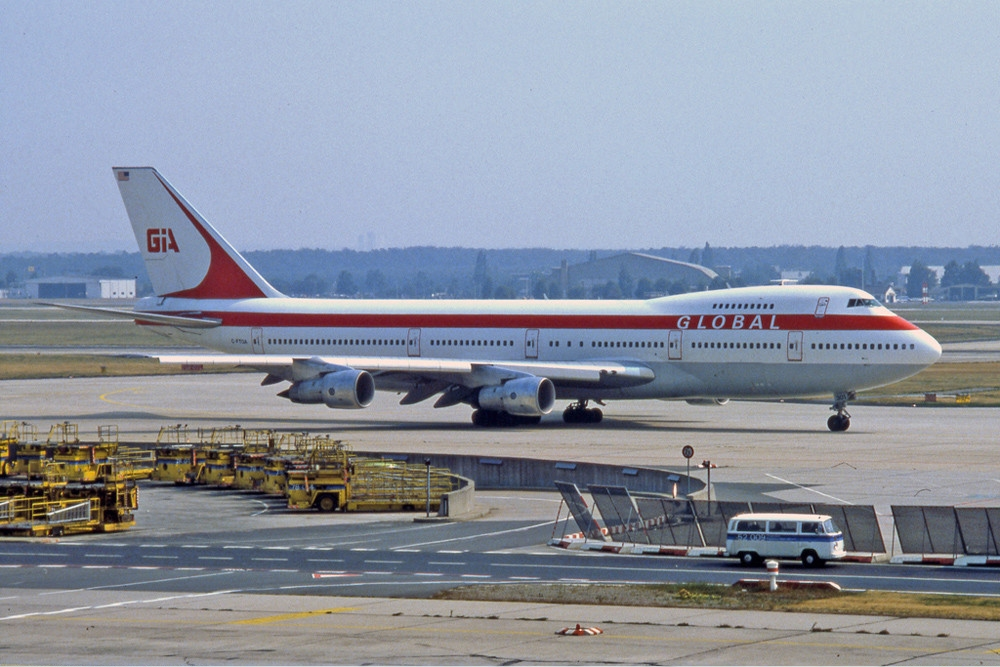
Boeing 747 Frankfurt August 1983

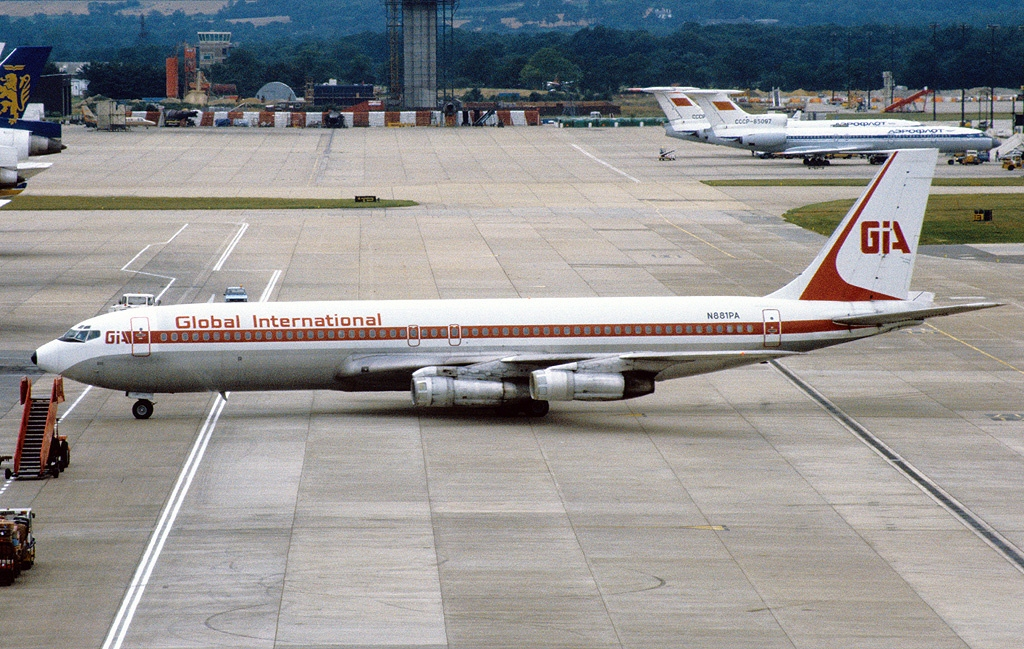
Boeing 707-320C Gatwick 1982

Global International Airways (GIA) was an American charter airline company based in Kansas City, Missouri. Its main business was originally flying cattle to the Mideast, before becoming a more general charter airline. It had a sideline flying weapons. The Central Intelligence Agency was apparently a customer.

== History ==
GIA incorporated in Missouri on 30 December 1977. The airline started flying in August 1978 as an commercial operator, an airline operating on a contract basis (not as a common carrier) without economic certification from the Civil Aeronautics Board, the now-defunct Federal agency that then governed most US commercial air transport. GIA's main business was flying cattle from the US to the Mideast, mostly Iran, which ceased due to the Iranian Revolution in late 1979. The airline received a charter certificate in 1980. The airline was over 90% owned by Farhad Azima, and had a cattle export business affiliate.

In July 1979 GIA was the focus of an international incident when a flight from Beirut to Nicaragua, nominally full of medical supplies, was diverted to an air base in Tunisia, where it was loaded with weapons. The crew became suspicious and flew the aircraft to a civilian airport, whereupon the accompanying passengers vanished and the crew was held by the Tunisian government. The weapons were said to be from the Palestinian Liberation Organization for Sandinista rebels in Nicaragua and the apparent Red Crescent organization in Lebanon that originated the "medical supplies" turned out to be a front.

Global International began seasonal flights to Amsterdam, Frankfurt, London and Paris using the Boeing 707 in 1981. Global also used Boeing 727s for charters to the Caribbean as well as a leased Boeing 747-100.

GIA's charters included munitions flights, referred to by GIA pilots as "cabbages and cabbage-launchers". Items included rockets, ammunition, rifles and landmines. Destinations for such flights included Ecuador, Egypt, Haiti, Kenya, Pakistan, Peru and Thailand. GIA also attempted to establish a base through negotiations with Samuel K. Doe in Liberia for Boeing 707s, aircraft that were becoming uneconomic in the United States due to noise regulations. The failed transaction resulted in a stranded Boeing 707 in Liberia at a reported loss of $1 million. Azima described GIA's business model as buying 707s cheaply in the US, flying them for some time, then selling them at a markup overseas where noise regulations were not a factor.

GIA filed for Chapter 11 bankruptcy in October 1983. It continued to operate in Chapter 11 until the Federal Aviation Administration (FAA) suspended its operations in December 1983, citing poor record keeping. It resumed operations in February 1984. FAA records show GIA in existence as of year-end 1984 but not year-end 1985.

GIA was financed by a number of unsecured loans totaling $600,000 from the Indian Springs State Bank, a small Kansas bank, at the instigation of Farhad Azima. Azima was a major shareholder and bank director and considered the bank's best customer because of large deposits he made. GIA's bad loans were a major factor in the closing of Indian Springs in January 1984, three months after the GIA bankruptcy.

In a 2017 Associated Press article, a former accounting executive of GIA said that the Central Intelligence Agency was a client.

== Fleet ==
Global International operated the following aircraft:

Global International Airways fleet
Aircraft	Total	Introduced	Retired	Notes
Boeing 707-320B	18	1979	1984	
Boeing 727-100	1	1982	1983	Leased from American Airlines
Boeing 727-100	1	1983	1983	Leased from American International Airways
Boeing 727-200	1	1984	1984	Leased from Hapag-Lloyd Flug
Boeing 747-100	1	1983	1983	Leased from Air Canada

== Accidents and incidents ==
- 4 December 1982 – Boeing 707-320B N8434 struck an ILS aerial during takeoff at Brasília on its way to New York City. The aircraft returned and made an emergency landing where its left landing gear collapsed. All 49 passengers and 8 crew members survived without injuries, but the aircraft was a writeoff. The aircraft was loaded with TV equipment and media people related to a visit of President Ronald Reagan to Brazil and was 13 tons overweight.

== See also ==
- List of defunct airlines of the United States
- Mark Lombardi
