= Spectrum 7 =

Oil Company

- Founders: William DeWitt; Mercer Reynolds

Spectrum 7 was an oil company started by William DeWitt and Mercer Reynolds.

In 1984, Spectrum 7 merged with George W. Bush's Arbusto Energy. After the merger, Bush became the Chairman and CEO of Spectrum 7.

According to George Soros, Bush's presence at Spectrum 7 made the failing company more attractive than it would otherwise have been.

Spectrum 7 was purchased by Harken Energy in 1986. Due to this purchase Bush became involved in the Harken Energy scandal.
