= BioGems Initiative =

The BioGems Initiative is a set of ecological activism efforts launched by the Washington, DC–based nonprofit organization Natural Resources Defense Council in 2001. The effort's objective is to mobilize concerned entities in defending exceptionally valuable ecosystems at risk of destruction. The list of BioGems includes regions and endangered species, largely in the Americas. Some Biogems include Carrizo Plain National Monument and the Peace-Athabasca Delta.
