= Guillermo Hernández-Cartaya =

Guillermo Hernández-Cartaya was a Cuban banker born sometime in 1932 (the New York Times described him in 1977 as in his "mid-fifties"); he spent 20 years as a banker in Cuba.

== Bay of Pigs fiasco ==
He first became notable when in 1961, after having previously joined the Brigade 2506/Operation 40 organization and participating in the Bay of Pigs Invasion (possibly in revenge for Fidel Castro having destroyed his livelihood; Cartaya had been on very good terms with the former rulers of Cuba), he was sentenced to three years in jail for his part in the invasion. How he got out of jail is unclear.

== World Finance Corporation ==
Back in the United States, he garnered infamy when his elaborate financial empire, centered around the World Finance Corporation which he founded in 1971, came crashing down in 1977 — the scandal was estimated to have cost depositors and taxpayers on three continents more than $50 million. He was captured using forged passports to leave Miami after escaping from the United Arab Emirates (despite the confiscation of his real passport). In 1982, he was charged in court with a number of crimes, mainly money laundering, drug and arms trafficking, and embezzlement. For some reason, all charges except income tax evasion were dropped, apparently at the insistence of the CIA (which had, incidentally, sponsored the Bay of Pigs invasion, and has long been said to covertly support the Colombian cocaine trade Cartaya facilitated). In the aftermath, Florida Attorney General Robert Shevin returned $7,600 in contributions from WFC-connected Latin businessmen. Dade County Democratic chairman Michael Abrams resigned from the board of a WFC-backed insurance company.

== Acquittal and conviction ==
Cartaya and his former aide Salvador Aldereguia-Ors were acquitted in 1978 of a 1978 indictment charging them with conspiring to use a false passport to help Hernandez Cartaya escape from Ajman in the United Arab Emirates. Cartaya's passport had been confiscated in an attempt by the Ajmani to have him repay the more than 12 million missing $USD.

He, Francisco J. Fernandez, and Vicente Carrodeguas were only ever convicted of tax evasion (Henry Heitman, Jr., who was the only defendant to testify, was acquitted); they had not reported a number of large bonuses as salary. An appeal to the Supreme Court was denied.

After serving one year in prison, Cartaya was released on 6 June 1987. Kwitny records that there were rumors that Cartaya retired to Galveston, Texas.

=== Castro connection ===
There were multiple reports linking Cartaya with Fidel Castro. His aide Aldereguia-Ors was found by the FBI on his arrest on charges of preparing Cartaya a fake passport (in Miami International Airport en route to Kingston, Jamaica) to possess in his briefcase a letter 'from a Cuban secret police agent' addressed to a spy named "Samuel". Ors admitted fighting with Castro, and to helping Rebel Army friends find jobs at WFC, but he denied being the Cuban spy Samuel, and claimed the letter & his planned meetings with Cuban officials referred to 'an effort to bring refugees out of Cuba to the United States'. FBI agents would testify in court that besides the letter, the briefcase contained 'operational instructions from a foreign country'.

Rep. Lester L. Wolff stated on 60 Minutes that Cartaya's WFC arranged for Castro a 100 million USD loan to Colombia (the Colombian officials agreeing to aid cocaine smuggling).

The Metro Public Safety Department's Organized Crime Bureau earlier reported an informant's claim that Castro was an initial investor in WFC.
