= Robert Hobbs =

American art historian

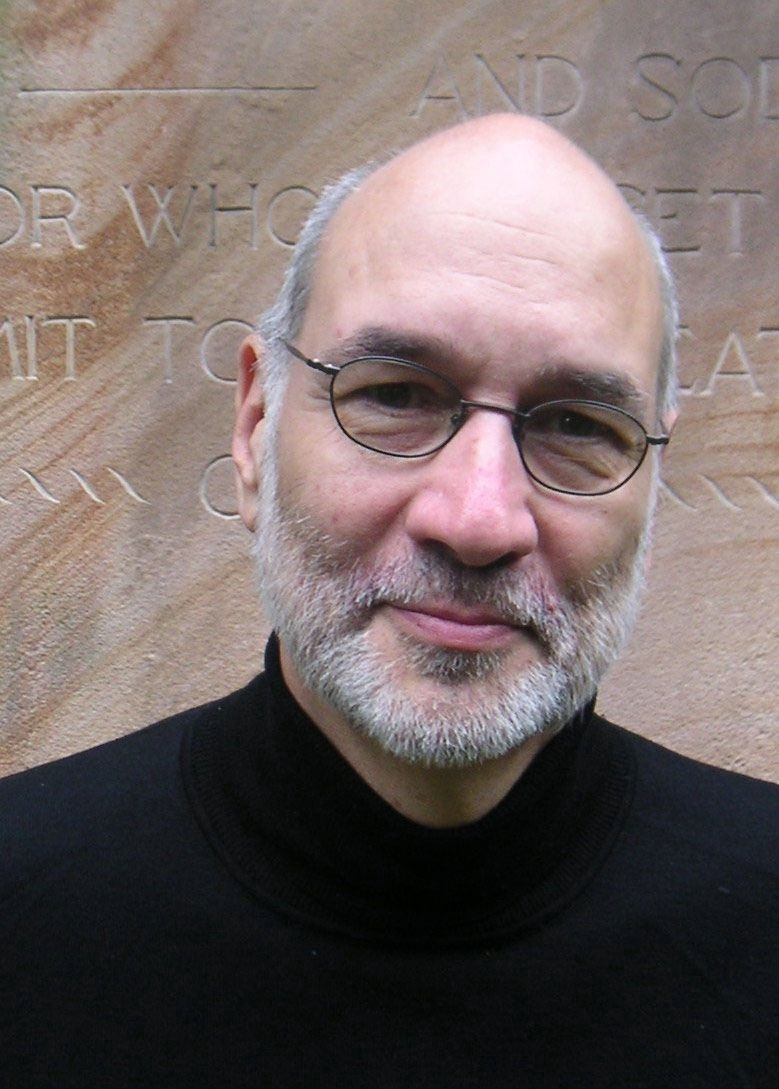
Robert Hobbs, photograph by Jean Crutchfield, 2008

Robert Carleton Hobbs is an American art historian and curator specializing in twentieth-century art. Since 1991 he has held the Rhoda Thalhimer Endowed Chair of American Art in the School of Arts, Virginia Commonwealth University, a highly ranked art department. Since 2004 he has served as a visiting professor at Yale University. He has held positions at Cornell University, University of Iowa, Florida State University, and Tehran Museum of Contemporary Art in Iran, and is known for a number of books, in-depth essays, and exhibitions.

== Early life ==
Born in 1946, Hobbs is the son of scientist Charles S. Hobbs, who is best known for conducting the primary research on fluorine and teeth as well as investigating, over a thirty-year period, the residual genetic effects of the nuclear fallout on beef cattle found within a 150-mile radius of Los Alamos. His mother, Corinne Clay, was a coloratura soprano with a repertoire in five languages.

While living in his family's scenic retreat where the Tennessee Valley Authority (T.V.A.) had been planned, Robert Hobbs enrolled in the early 1960s in Maryville High School, which in the post-Sputnik era had a greater percentage of students attending M.I.T. than any other high school in the nation. During this time he was employed summers, running routine experiments in a chemical lab and acting in local college theatrical productions.

In 1969 Hobbs received his B.A. at the University of Tennessee (Knoxville), working with Dale Cleaver, who was a student of Joshua Taylor, who in turn had studied with Heinrich Wölfflin. In 1975 he was awarded a Ph.D. degree from the University of North Carolina at Chapel Hill. His dissertation director was philosopher, art historian, and poet Donald Kuspit, who had been a student of the Frankfurt School director Theodor Adorno. Combining philosophic, social history, and formalist views, Hobbs wrote a dissertation on Robert Motherwell's Elegies to the Spanish Republic while participating in the Whitney Museum of American Art Independent Study Program. The next year, as a lecturer at Yale University, he lived in Motherwell's guesthouse in Greenwich, Connecticut, and turned sections of his dissertation into essays for the catalogue that accompanied this artist's first European retrospective.

== Academic career ==
After accepting the position of assistant professor at Cornell University, Hobbs co-curated in 1978 Abstract Expressionism: The Formative Years (with Gail Levin), which was jointly organized by Cornell's Herbert F. Johnson Museum of Art and the Whitney Museum of American Art. This exhibition provided the first retrospective view of early Abstract Expressionism and helped to redirect studies of the material away from the then predominantly formalist views of New York critic Clement Greenberg.

In 1978 Hobbs took a leave of absence from Cornell in order to assume the position of Chief Curator of the Tehran Museum of Contemporary Art and direct Farabi University's museum affiliated program. Finding himself in the throes of a full-scale revolution, he was able to leave Tehran in December 1978, the last day before the airport closed.

Several years later, as an associate professor at Cornell, he curated the first retrospective of earth artist Robert Smithson, which was shown at the Whitney in 1981. In addition to being presented in five United States' venues, this exhibition was selected as the U.S. official representation for the 1982 Venice Biennale, and it subsequently traveled to five European museums. An adjunct to this exhibition was Hobbs' Cornell University Press monograph on Smithson's sculpture, which has come to be regarded as a standard reference on this subject.

Hobbs became Director of the University of Iowa Museum of Art in 1982. For this institution, he co-curated with Gaylord Torrence the first exhibition to look chronologically at a single American Indian tribe's development. Entitled Art of the Red Earth People: The Mesquakie of Iowa, this exhibition and its co-authored catalogue surveyed 200 years of Meskwaki art history. While at the University of Iowa, Hobbs also brokered the gift of the important Stanley Collection of African Art, oversaw the publication of this collection by Christopher D. Roy, and co-curated with Fredrick Woodard Human Rights, Human Wrongs: Art and Social Change: Essays by the Faculty of the University of Iowa, which showcased a wide range of disciplinary views of individual works of art that varied from neurologist António Damásio's trenchant insights to Jorie Graham's erudite and complex poetry.

In 1988 Hobbs returned to full-time teaching at Florida State University, and in 1991 he accepted the Rhoda Thalhimer Endowed Chair at VCU. Since this time he has continued to work as both a scholar and a curator. Among his exhibitions are a retrospective of Lee Krasner's art, which opened at the Los Angeles County Museum of Art (LACMA) and traveled to the Brooklyn Museum, and also a retrospective of Mark Lombardi's drawings, which was shown at New York City's Drawing Center and Toronto's AGO. In addition, he curated the extensive group show Souls Grown Deep: African American Vernacular Art of the South and the one-person exhibition Thornton Dial: Remembering the Road, which were both organized in conjunction with the Michael C. Carlos Museum, Emory University, in conjunction with the 1996 Cultural Olympiad in Atlanta. In 2002 his Kara Walker exhibition Slavery! Slavery! became the U.S. official representation at the São Paulo Bienal. He co-curated with Jean Crutchfield in 2011 Tavares Strachan: seen/unseen that took place from September 19 through October 28, 2011, at an undisclosed location in New York City. In 2012–13, Hobbs curated the exhibitions Cellblock I and Cellblock II at Andrea Rosen Gallery in New York City. Later that year, Hobbs and Crutchfield also co-curated Strachan's exhibition Polar Eclipse which represented the Bahamas at the 55th Venice Biennale.

Former students include Duchamp specialist Craig Adcock, Robert Ryman scholar Vittorio Colaizzi, filmmaker and artist Shelly Silver, biographer and New York Times critic Deborah Solomon, and New York abstract painter James Siena.

== Publications ==
Hobbs has continued to write extensively on modern and postmodern art, including investigations of the work of the following artists (listed alphabetically): Alice Aycock, Hernan Bas, Duane Hanson, Keith Haring, Jonathan Lasker, Mark Lindquist, Malcolm Morley, Robert Motherwell, Beverly Pepper, Richard Pousette-Dart, Neo Rauch, Andres Serrano, Yinka Shonibare, James Siena, Frank Stella, Frank Thiel, Kara Walker, Kelley Walker, John Wesley, and Kehinde Wiley, among others.

His "Merleau-Ponty's Phenomenology and Installation Art" (2001) for the Mattress Factory discerns relations between this philosopher's thought and Harold Rosenberg's criticism, and it underscores the impact of both on the development of installation art in the late 1950s, thus demonstrating how this French philosopher's ideas were important to New York artists over a decade before the advent of Robert Morris's minimalism.

His "Affluence, Taste, and the Brokering of Knowledge: Notes on the Social Context of Early Conceptual Art" looks at the social history of collecting and taste as well as the tremendous respect for education in the 1950s and early 1960s that helped to prepare the way for the rapid and relatively widespread acceptance of conceptual art in the 1960s.

Hobbs has written in-depth essays for the Rubell Collection (Miami), including a historical overview, titled "Looking B(l)ack: Reflections of White Racism" (for the well-received exhibition 30 Americans) that looks at the challenges, goals, and sensibilities facing African-American artists from the 1980s to the present.

== Personal life ==
In 1994 Hobbs married Jean Crutchfield, who had established a reputation for directing cutting-edge galleries in New York, Chicago, and Paris. [Having grown up in Geneva, Switzerland where she attended the International School, she is fluent in French.] She has worked closely with such artists as Alice Aycock, Christian Boltanski, David Ireland, Alfredo Jaar, Sherrie Levine, Kay Rosen, and Lorna Simpson. Since their marriage, Crutchfield co-curated The Art of Aggression, and she has curated Presumed Innocence, as well as one-person shows of the work of Diana Cooper, Gregory Crewdson (first museum showing), Yoko Ono, and Monique Prieto (first museum showing), in addition to continuing to serve as a fine arts consultant.

== Selected bibliography ==
=== Selected Books and Catalogues by Hobbs ===
2014

- Robert Hobbs, Robert Motherwell: Theorizing Abstract Expressionism. London: 21 Publishing, 2014.
- Robert Hobbs, Kelley Walker. New York: PJC, 2014.
- Robert Hobbs, Trinie Dalton, Christopher Glazek, David Altmejd. Bologna: Damiani, 2014.
- Robert Hobbs and Franklin Sirmans, Tavares Strachan: Seen/Unseen: Hong Kong: Art Asia Pacific, 2014.

2013

- Robert Hobbs, Stamatina Gregory, Christian Viveros-Faune, I Belong Here (New York: D.A.P., 2013). This publication served as the catalogue for Tavares Strachan: Polar Eclipse, Bahamas Pavilion, 55th La Biennale di Venezia, June–November 2013, curated by Jean Crutchfield and Robert Hobbs.

2012

- Robert Hobbs. Jonathan Lasker: Early Works 1977–1985. New York: Cheim and Reid, 2012.

2009

- Robert Hobbs, Matthew Collings, Mel Gooding and Robert Motherwell. Open. London: 21 Publishing Ltd., 2009.
- Robert Hobbs, Jorg Heiser, Alessandro Rabottini and Sterling Ruby. Sterling Ruby. Bergamo: Galleria d'Arte Moderna e Contemporanea of Bergamo, 2009.

2008

- Robert Hobbs and Rachel Kent, Yinka Shonibare, MBE. Munich, London, and New York: Prestel, 2008.; revised edition, 2014.

2005

- Alice Aycock: Sculpture and Projects. Cambridge and London: M.I.T. Press, 2005.

2003

- Mark Lombardi: Global Networks. New York: Independent Curators International in conjunction with D.A.P., 2003.

2001

- Milton Avery: The Late Paintings. New York: Harry N. Abrams, Inc., Publishers, 2001.

1999

- Lee Krasner. New York: Harry N. Abrams, Inc., Publishers, 1999.

1995

- Beatrice Mandelman: Taos Modernist. Albuquerque: University of New Mexico Press, 1995.

1991

- Lee Krasner. New York: Abbeville Press, 1993.

1990

- Milton Avery. New York: Hudson Hills Press, Inc., 1990.

Robert Hobbs and Joanne Kuebler. Richard Pousette-Dart. Bloomington: Indiana University Press, 1990.

1989

- Gaylord Torrence and Robert Hobbs. Art of the Red Earth People: The Mesquakie of Iowa. Iowa City: The University of Iowa Museum of Art, 1989.

1987

- Edward Hopper. New York: Harry N. Abrams, Inc., Publishers, in association with National Museum of American Art, Smithsonian Institution, 1987.

1982

- Robert Smithson: A Retrospective View. Washington, D.C.: The United States International Communications Agency, 1982.

1981

- Robert Smithson: Sculpture. Ithaca: Cornell University Press, 1981.

Robert Hobbs and Gail Levin. Abstract Expressionism: The Formative Years. New York: Whitney Museum of American Art, 1978. [Republished by Cornell University Press, 1981.]

1976

- Robert Motherwell Retrospective. Düsseldorf: Städische Kunsthalle Düsseldorf, 1976.

=== Selected essays and articles by Hobbs ===
2014

- "Krasner, Mitchell, and Frankenthaler" in Abstract Expressionist Women Painters, ed. Joan Marter. New Haven and London: Yale University Press, Forthcoming.
- "Minimal Art" in Dwan Gallery, 1959–1971, ed. Anne Kovach and James Meyer. Cambridge and London: M.I.T. Press, Forthcoming.

2013

- Hobbs, Robert. "Renaud Regnery's Post-Future/Past-Exotic Viet Cong Series", in Renaud Regnery: Viet Cong. September 14 – October 26, 2013, Klemm's Galerie, Berlin. 2013.

2009

- "Motherwell's Open: Heidegger, Mallarmé, and Zen". Robert Hobbs, Matthew Collings, Mel Gooding and Robert Motherwell. Open. London: 21 Publishing Ltd., 2009.
- "Sterling Ruby's Post-Humanist Art". Robert Hobbs, Jorg Heiser, Alessandro Rabottini and Sterling Ruby. Sterling Ruby. Bergamo: Galleria d'Arte Moderna e Contemporanea of Bergamo, 2009.

2008

- "Form is a Verb: Pousette-Dart and Vorticism". Pousette-Dart Drawing: Form is a Verb. New York: Knoedler & Company, 2008.

2007

- "Hernan Bas' 'Fag Limbo' and the Tactics of Reframing Societal Texts". Mark Coetzee. Hernan Bas: Works from the Rubell Family Collection. Miami: Rubell Family Collection, 2007.
- "Kelley Walker's Continuum: Consuming and Recycling as Aesthetic Tactics". Suzanne Cotter, ed., Seth Price/Kelley Walker: Continuous Project. Oxford, UK: Modern Art Oxford, 2007.
- "Lee Krasner's Skepticism and Her Emergent Postmodernism". Woman's Art Journal 28, No. 2 (Fall/Winter 2007).
- "Robert Beck's Dust". Bill Horrigan, Helen Molesworth, and Robert Hobbs, Robert Beck: Dust. Columbus: Wexner Center for the Arts, 2007. Wexner Center for the Arts

2005

- "Malcolm Morley: The Art of Painting". Malcolm Morley. New York: Sperone, Westwater, 2005.
- "Robert Motherwell's Elegies to the Spanish Republic", 1976 (revised 2004). Ellen G. Landau, ed., Reading Abstract Expressionism: Context and Critique. New Haven and London: Yale University Press, 2005.
- "Surrealism and Abstract Expressionism: From Psychic to Plastic Automatism". Isabelle Dervaux, Surrealism USA. New York: National Academy Museum in conjunction with Hatje Cantz Publishers, 2005.
- "The Term 'Color Field'". The Shape of Colour. Toronto: Art Gallery of Ontario, 2005.
- "Neo Rauch's Purposive Ambiguities" in Neo Rauch. Málaga, Spain: CAC Málaga, 2005.

2004

- "Affluence, Taste, and the Brokering of Knowledge: Notes on the Social context of Early Conceptual Art". Michael Corris, ed., Conceptual Art: Theory, Myth, and Practice. Cambridge: Cambridge University Press, 2004.

2003

- "Jonathan Lasker's Dramatis Personae". Jonathan Lasker: Paintings, Drawings, Studies. Madrid: Museo Nacional Centro de Arte Reina Sofía in co-production with K20 Kunstsammlung Nordrhein-Westfalen, Düsseldorf, 2003.
- "Pierre Huyghe's Ellipses". Parkett 66 (Fall 2003).
- "Reading Black Through White: Kara Walker and the Question of Racial Stereotyping: A Discussion between Michael Corris and Robert Hobbs". Art History 26, no. 3 (June 2003); rpt. in Gill Perry, ed., Differences and Excess in Contemporary Art: The Visibility of Women's Practices. Oxford: Blackwell, 2004.

2002

- “Frank Stella, Then and Now”. Frank Stella: Recent Work. Singapore: Singapore Tyler Print Institute, 2002.

2001

- "Merleau-Ponty's Phenomenology and Installation Art". Claudia Giannini, ed., Installations Mattress Factory 1990–1999. Pittsburgh: University of Pittsburgh Press, 2001.

2000

- "Frank Stella: Matrixed and Real Space". Frank Stella. Philadelphia: Locks Gallery, 2000.

1988

- "Sally Michel: The Other Avery". Woman's Art Journal 8 (Fall 1987 – Winter 1988).

=== Selected Reviews and News Coverage ===
- Cumming, Laura. "Venice Biennale: 10 of the best artists - in pictures". The Guardian, June 1, 2013.
- Chan, Dawn. "Tavares Strachan". Artforum. May 29, 2013.
- Volk, Gregory. "Venice Biennale Journeys: Kjartansson and Strachan". Art in America. June 24, 2013.
- Cotter, Holland. "Beyond the 'Palace,' an International Tour in One City". Art Review. The New York Times. June 5, 2013.
- 55th Venice Biennale, Exclusive Interview: Robert Hobbs/Co-curator of the Bahamian Pavilion, June 7, 2013.
