= World Finance Corporation =

WFC Corp.
- Formerly: World Finance Corporation
- Founded: 1971; 55 years ago
- Founder: Guillermo Hernández-Cartaya
- Headquarters: Coral Gables, Florida, United States

A picture of Cartaya from the New York Times.

World Finance Corporation (abbreviated WFC; later renamed simply WFC Corp.) was a financial corporation founded in 1971 and headquartered in Coral Gables Florida. When WFC Corp was headed and controlled by Guillermo Hernandez-Cartaya (a former Cuban banker who was an agent of the CIA, and believed to be an agent of the Mafia, and also of various Colombian drug lords) through the WFC Group shell company, it became known for a major financial scandal in which over $50 million was lost. This scandal was the subject of a 60 Minutes segment on 26 February 1978. Cartaya controlled it through a number of shell companies, the most well known of which was the WFC Group.

== Founding ==
The corporation was founded in 1971 by the Cuban expatriate banker Guillermo Hernandez-Cartaya, after he finished serving a Cuban sentence for his participation in The Bay of Pigs Invasion. The New York Times said:

With the formation of WFC, former associates said, Mr. Hernandez-Cartaya hoped to utilize his wide-ranging contacts in the Latin American political and economic world to tap the growing market between American lenders and Latin American borrowers made possible by the 1969 Edge Act.

== WFC Group ==
The WFC Group was a shell company owned entirely by Guillermo Hernandez-Cartaya; it owned a large proportion of WFC and served to also mask Cartaya's controlling interest in it and other corporations.

== Overseas loans and banks ==
In 1975, WFC was designated an "exclusive official agent by the Colombian Government for a loan of US$100 million, the largest in the nation's history."

=== Unibank ===
Two years before, in 1973, WFC founded Unibank (Union de Bancos SA), a Panamanian bank. It received with unusual swiftness Panama's most liberal banking license, a Class One license. Most of the equity was held by WFC, but a total of 24% (8% each) was held by three American banks—a subsidiary of Mercantile Trust Company of St. Louis, First National Bank of Louisville, and Midatlantic Banks of West Orange, N. S. Stakes were also held initially by two Latin American banks.

Unibank was rather successful—by 1976 it had affiliates worldwide and about US$50 million in deposit. In 1977, the banking commissioner of Panama seized Unibank; he had little choice since Unibank was a debtor to the National Bank of Panama, and already US$10 million had been lost. Unibank would not be the only bank begun by WFC principals to collapse with great financial loss.

=== Pan American Bank ===
In 1976, the Comptroller of the Currency forced Cartaya out of his control of the Pan American Bank of Hiateah in Florida – US$2 million had gone missing due to bad overdrafts and uncollected funds. This incident was the reason for the Comptroller's later involvement in the investigation that broke open the WFA scandal.

Also in 1976, US Customs agents intercepted a private plane inbound from Panama. Aboard was thousands of dollars in cash, strapped to a woman associated with WFC's vice president. On the plane were also that Vice President, Cartaya, and Cartaya's wife.

=== Ajman Arab Bank ===
Another bank had been started in the United Arab Emirates's Sheikdom of Ajman, with the collaboration of the Ajman government. It was called the Ajman Arab Bank. It was plagued by the same problems as Unibank, and was shut down May 1977. Cartaya went to the UAE, apparently to try to explain the missing money, and the authorities confiscated his passport. Cartaya nonetheless escaped the UAE, using documents brought him by a fellow Cuban.

== Investigation and scandal ==
WFC came to national attention when an investigation in 1976 by the District Attorney of Dade County, Florida, (along with four other governmental agencies; besides the Dade County Public Safety Office, the FBI, the IRS, the DEA, and the Comptroller of the Currency all participated in the joint investigation) revealed that the WFC held the dubious distinction of being the longest running (and largest) launderer of money for Colombian cocaine smugglers; the investigation proceeded for approximately two years. Somewhat ironically, the law enforcement personnel literally stumbled onto lead, when, during an investigation of a pest-control service called King Spray Service suspected of drug smuggling, two agents of the Dade County Public Safety Office (which, under Donald Skelton, led the investigation until the Justice Department took over) were searching through the company's garbage, in which they found financial records of WFC, recording very large transfers of funds between the bank and the company, along with small amounts of marijuana. The investigation ruined WFC Corp, and it closed in 1980. Simultaneously, overdrafts at the National Bank of South Florida (controlled by WFC after a large payment of cash for equity) prompted an investigation by bank examiners.

Cartaya used the bank as the centerpiece of an elaborate corporate labyrinth, through which the funds and bad loans (to Cartaya and his associates) were filtered and "laundered". An example of the labyrinth: WFC Corp. was 100% owned by the WFC Group, which itself was owned by Cartaya to the amount of 24.7%; another 23.3% was held by "Neo-Floridian Development Company"- of NFDC, 54.4% was held by Cartaya, again.

A considerable proportion of the money was funneled through a bank in the Bahamas called the Cisalpine Bank*, and from thence to the Vatican Bank to Swiss numbered accounts; this bank was owned by Vatican Bank manager Archbishop Paul Marcinkus and notorious dirty Italian banker Roberto Calvi. The Cisalpine Bank* seems to have also been laundering heroin profits through the Nugan Hand Bank for the Grey Wolves.

The bank was involved with a number of prominent Floridians, such as Walter Sterling Surrey, a stockholder in, director of, and lawyer for, WFC Corp. Kwitny recounts,

Surrey says he came aboard mainly to help start a foreign-based mutual fund for an old client, a Cuban exile who helped found World Finance. He says he dropped out in 1976 when the mutual fund deal fell through, and that he was unaware of any criminal or intelligence activities of the company.

The investigation and its aftermath were marred and dogged by persistent rumors and allegations of corruption and cover ups by various governmental agencies. Jonathan Kwitny writes this of the Justice Department's head investigator, Jerome Sanford:

He says the main investigation was halted by Washington in 1978, after the CIA objected that 12 of the Justice Department's chief targets were "of interest" to it. Sanford says he was told that this meant the men he was investigating were CIA operatives of one sort or another. Florida lawmen who worked with Sanford backed up his story.

Two of the suspects were Richard Fincher and Hernandez-Cartaya. In the aftermath, Florida Attorney General Robert Shevin returned $7,600 in contributions from WFC-connected Latin businessmen. Dade County Democratic chairman Michael Abrams resigned from the board of a WFC-backed insurance company.

Kwitny and Sanford were not the only ones to detect things amiss; Kwitny offers this extract from a House Select Committee on Narcotics and Drug Abuse staff report:

There is no question that the parameters of the WFC can encompass a large body of criminal activity, including aspects of political corruption, gun running, as well as narcotics trafficking on an international level ... It is against this background that our investigation encountered a number of veiled or direct references to CIA or KGB complicity or involvement in narcotics trafficking in South Florida.

There were also allegations that 8 of the 12 bank directors were either current or former CIA employees, and that then-CIA director William J. Casey (coincidentally, a Roman Catholic) apparently stymied the investigation for reasons of "national security". And so the two-year investigation ended in the conviction of Cartaya in 1982 for nothing more than tax evasion.
