= House of Bush, House of Saud =

2004 non-fiction book by Craig Unger

- Author: Craig Unger
- Publication date: 2004

House of Bush, House of Saud: The Secret Relationship Between the World's Two Most Powerful Dynasties is a 2004 book by Craig Unger that explores the relationship between the Saudi Royal Family and the Bush extended political family. Unger asserts that the groundwork for today's terrorist movements and the modern wars that have sprung up about them was unintentionally laid more than 30 years ago with a series of business deals between the ruling Saudis and the powerful Bush family. The Saudis received investments and military protection in exchange for cooperation on lucrative oil deals. The author claims that the result has been a shady alliance between "the world's two most powerful dynasties." Unger writes, "Never before has an American president been so closely tied to a foreign power that harbors and supports our country's mortal enemies."

Unger reportedly traced $1.4 billion in investments by the Saudis to friends and business organizations closely associated with the Bush family. Newsweek's Michael Isikoff had harsh criticism of the $1.4 billion figure, the Saudi connection, and the flights out of the U.S. According to Isikoff: "Nearly 90 percent of that amount, $1.18 billion, comes from just one source: contracts in the early to mid-1990s that the Saudi Arabian government awarded to a U.S. defense contractor, BDM, for training the country's military and National Guard." According to Newsweek, George W. Bush could not have been involved with the Carlyle Group, which owned BDM, when the $1.18 billion deal was made, because "former president Bush didn't join the Carlyle advisory board until April, 1998—five months after Carlyle had already sold BDM to another defense firm."

On his website, Unger replied that Isikoff wrongly suggests that the Bush family and its allies had little or no relationship with the Carlyle Group until 1998. "If that were true, he might have a point."

But in fact, the Bush-Carlyle relationship began eight years earlier when the Carlyle Group put George W. Bush on the board of one of its subsidiaries, Caterair, in 1990. In 1993, after the Bush-Quayle administration left office and George H. W. Bush and James Baker were free to join the private sector, the Bush family's relationship with the Carlyle Group began to become substantive. By the end of that year, key figures at the Carlyle Group included such powerful Bush colleagues as James Baker, Frank Carlucci, and Richard Darman. Because George W. Bush's role at Carlyle had been marginal, the $1.4 billion figure includes no contracts that predated the arrival of Baker, Carlucci and Darman at Carlyle. With former Secretary of Defense Carlucci guiding the acquisition of defense companies, Carlyle finally began making real money from the Saudis, both through investments from the royal family, the bin Ladens and other members of the Saudi elite, and through lucrative defense investments.

Isikoff also argued there was nothing extraordinary about the evacuation of the Saudis because Tampa International Airport had reopened. Unger disagreed, noting, "Commercial aviation slowly resumed on September 13, but at 10:57 am that day, the Federal Aviation Administration issued a Notice to Airmen stating that private aviation was still banned. Three planes violated that order and were forced down by American military aircraft that day. Yet the Saudis were allowed to fly on the ten passenger Learjet. ... The Tampa to Lexington flight is vital because it required permission from the highest levels of our government. If it were just another normal flight, why would anyone go to a crisis-stricken White House to get permission for the Saudis to fly?"

Research conducted for this book backs up claims made in controversial documentary filmmaker Michael Moore's 2004 picture Fahrenheit 9/11.
