= Harken Energy scandal =

Corporate scandal in 1990

The Harken Energy Scandal refers to a series of transactions entered into during 1990 involving Harken Energy. These transactions are alleged to involve either issues relating to insider trading, or influence peddling. Although no wrongdoings were found by any investigating authorities, the matter generated political controversy.

== Spectrum 7 purchase ==
George W. Bush ran an energy company called Spectrum 7 during the 1980s. In the mid-1980s the oil market was in a slump, with prices dropping daily. The firm was in financial trouble until another company, a distressed oil properties specialist, Harken Energy, purchased Spectrum 7 in 1986. Part of the attraction for Harken's management to purchase Spectrum 7 was having Bush on its board — his father was then vice-president, he had extensive political connections and knowledge of the oil and gas business. Harken Energy offered Bush a seat on its board of directors along with stock worth about $500,000 at the time. Bush received a consulting contract worth between $80,000 and $120,000 annually as well.

== The Job ==
In 1987 and 1988, George W. Bush dedicated himself (and much of his efforts) to the presidential campaign of his father George H. W. Bush. Fortunes turned for Bush, and the following year he invested in the Texas Rangers baseball team. To help pay for this investment, he borrowed a sum of $600,000; to pay off the loan, he sold his stock in Harken Energy. That investment paid off handsomely for him, not only monetarily. As team owner, the popularity derived from his public persona lead to the invitation to run for governor of Texas and ultimately, two terms as president.

== Bush's stock sale and its consequences for Harken Energy ==
George W. Bush sold 212,140 shares of Harken Energy at $4 a share on June 22, 1990, for a grand total of $848,560. Two months later, on August 20, Harken announced a larger than expected loss for the previous quarter. Surprisingly, the price of the company's stock shares barely declined at first, following these two negative, or "bearish", events. In the ensuing months, Harken's stock price did drift downward to $1.25 per share by the end of the year. However, the stock price then recovered its value and more the following year, which was strange behavior for the stock. The sale of the large block of shares had become widely publicized and allegations of the use of insider information, and improper stock transactions, were leveled at Bush.

=== SEC investigation ===
The SEC's exhaustive investigation examined thousands of pages of documents. Additionally, and in an unusual move, Bush waived client-attorney privileges so the attorneys could be questioned, in order to leave no remaining doubts on the subject. Regarding whether Bush knew in advance about the losses, the SEC investigators found: "The evidence establishes that George W. Bush was not aware of the majority of the items that comprised the loss Harken announced on August 20." The SEC investigators concluded that the loss resulted from write-downs and expenses that occurred after he sold his stock. Basically an outsider, Bush did not usually receive the Executive Committee's Weekly Flash Reports on the company's financial condition. In short, concluded an SEC investigative memo, George W. Bush was not particularly informed about the company's finances.

Regarding whether the stock was sold deliberately in time to avoid losing money before bad news was made public, the SEC found that Bush did not initiate the sale, but was contacted by a stockbroker who offered to buy a large block of Harken stock. There was evidence that before selling the stock, company board member Bush checked with inside and outside company executives, fellow directors and legal experts concerning the sale of his stock. The SEC report read, "In light of the facts uncovered, it would be difficult to establish that, even assuming Bush possessed material nonpublic information, he acted with sentience or intent to defraud."

Whether the news of Harken's unexpectedly large loss hurt the company's investors unfairly was quickly discarded after the SEC examined Harken Energy's share price just before and just after news of the loss was made public. Though the price dropped about 20% that day, the move downward was not immediate, and the price rebounded to $3 the following day. If indeed the announcement had caused a loss of confidence in the company, SEC investigators reasoned, the stock would most likely have fallen immediately and stayed down. "The conclusion of the Office of Economic Analysis is that, because the price of Harken did not immediately react to the earnings announcement and there is no news that explains Harken's return to its pre-announcement price of $3 on August 21, 1990, the earnings announcement did not provide investors with new material information," the SEC wrote. Moreover, the stock rebounded the next year and hit $8 a share.

== Formal troubles ==
There are also questions about when federal regulators were informed of the sale, and whether Bush tried to hide this information. Newspapers have alleged that though the law requires prompt disclosure of insider sales, Bush neglected to inform the SEC about his transaction until 34 weeks had passed. Even though he had broken the law, no charges were filed. Many have linked this to his father's position as president.

The reality of the matter is somewhat different. Although these articles usually do not mention it, only one of the two disclosure forms Bush was required to file with the SEC was delayed in its filing. The "Notice of Proposed Sale of Securities" Form 144, was filed on the day of the sale, June 22, 1990, thereby clearing Bush of the intent to hide or not disclose. Bush filed the second form, Form 4, the following year, in 1991, due to "a mix up with the attorneys". Because the stock sale information had indeed been disclosed, and duly filed in a timely manner via Form 144, the tardy filing of Form 4 was not viewed as a serious or punishable offense. It appears that the late filing of Form 4 was not considered serious by the SEC at the time.

== Conclusion ==
Bush was cleared of any wrongdoing. The Center for Public Integrity said of this episode - "The documents from the SEC inquiry show that Harken Energy engaged in questionable accounting practices as they attempted to stave off a financial crisis in 1989 and 1990. They also show that [George W.] Bush was unaware of much of what was going on in the company. Ultimately, the SEC required the company to correct its financial reports, but concluded there was insufficient evidence to pursue an insider trading case against Bush."
