= Craig Unger =

American journalist and writer

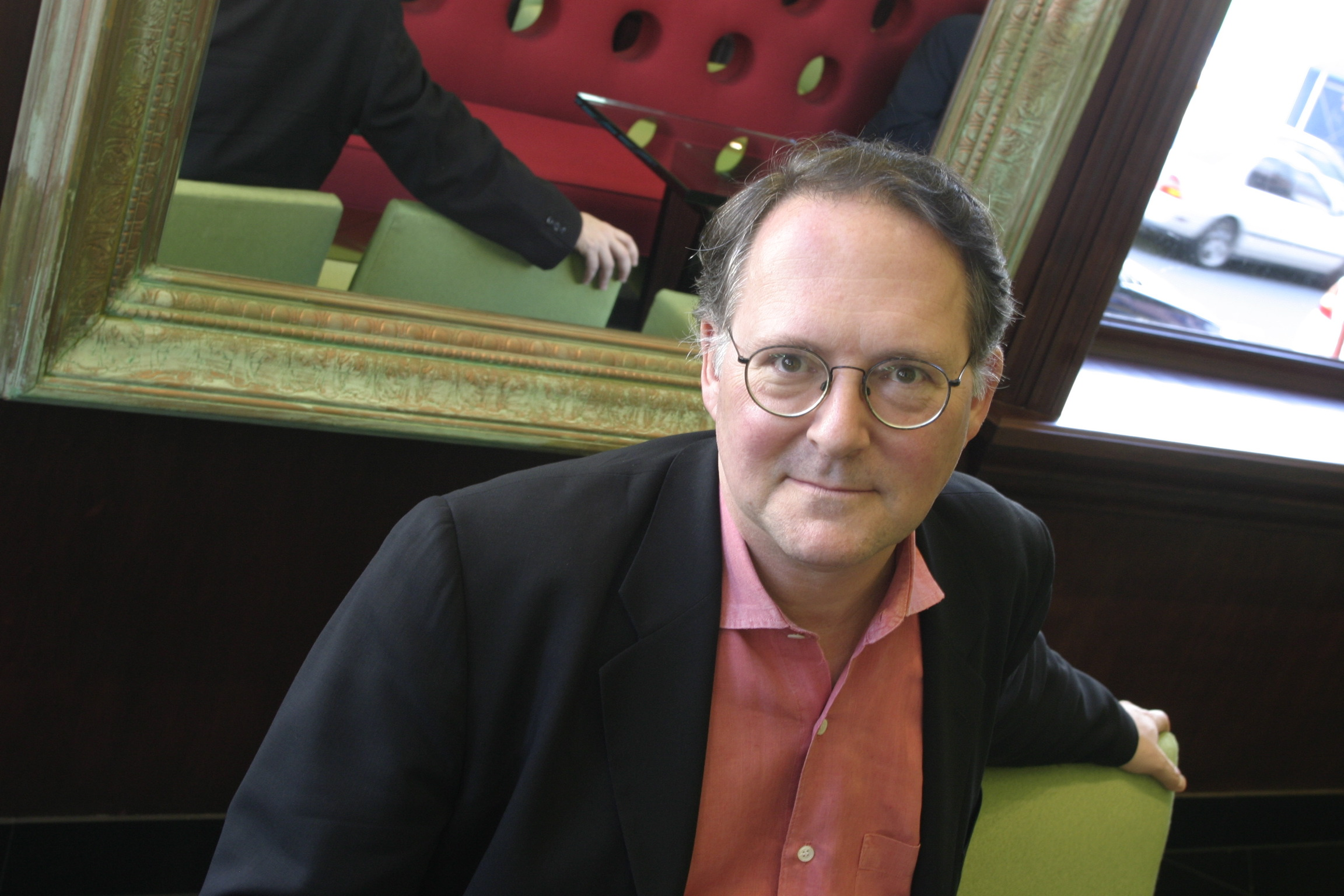
- Unger in 2008
- Born: March 25, 1949 (age 77); United States
- Education: Harvard University (B.A.,1971)
- Occupations: Journalist, writer

Craig Unger (born March 25, 1949) is an American journalist and writer. He has served as deputy editor of The New York Observer and was editor-in-chief of Boston magazine. He has written about George H. W. Bush and George W. Bush for The New Yorker, Esquire Magazine, and Vanity Fair. He has written about the Romney family and Hart InterCivic, as well as about Donald Trump's links to the Russian mafia, Vladimir Putin, and how "he is 'absolutely certain' that the U.S. president is a Russian asset".

== Early life and education ==
Unger grew up in Dallas, Texas, and graduated from Harvard University.

== Career ==
On April 11, 2004, Unger wrote an op-ed for The Boston Globe demanding answers from the 9/11 Commission on who had given permission for Saudi nationals to leave the United States. He repeated the theme in his 2004 book, House of Bush, House of Saud, that was also featured in Michael Moore's film Fahrenheit 9/11: "Is it possible that President Bush himself played a role in authorizing the evacuation of the Saudis after 9/11?" Unger reportedly traced $1.4 billion in investments by the Saudis to friends and business organizations closely associated with the Bush family.

Unger's 2007 book The Fall of the House of Bush is about the internal feud in the Bush family and the rise and collusion of the neoconservative and Christian right in Republican party politics, viewing each group's world view and efforts concerning present and potential future US policy through a distinctly negative prism. In his previous work, House of Bush, House of Saud explored the relationship between the Bush family and the House of Saud.

In his 2018 book, House of Trump, House of Putin: The Untold Story of Donald Trump and the Russian Mafia, Unger tells about links existing between the Russian mafia, Vladimir Putin, and the Trump Organization. He names 59 Russians as long-term business associates of Donald Trump In February 2025, Unger was interviewed and said that "he is 'absolutely certain' that the U.S. president is a Russian asset".

== Books ==
- Blue Blood (1989). New York: St. Martin's Press. ISBN 0-312-91777-5. OCLC 20801378.
- House of Bush, House of Saud: The Secret Relationship Between the World's Two Most Powerful Dynasties (2004). New York: Scribner. ISBN 978-0-7432-5337-6. OCLC 54662981.
- The Fall of the House of Bush: The Untold Story of How a Band of True Believers Seized the Executive Branch, Started the Iraq War, and Still Imperils America's Future (2007). New York: Scribner. ISBN 978-0-7432-8075-4. OCLC 173748598.
- American Armageddon: How the Delusions of the Neoconservatives and the Christian Right Triggered the Descent of America--and Still Imperil Our Future. (2008) New York: Scribner. ISBN 978-0-7432-8076-1. OCLC 191933848.
- Boss Rove: Inside Karl Rove's Secret Kingdom of Power (2012). New York: Scribner. ISBN 978-1-4516-9493-2. OCLC 792880648.
- When Women Win: EMILY's List and the Rise of Women in American Politics (2016), with Ellen Malcolm. Boston: Houghton Mifflin Harcourt. ISBN 978-0-544-44331-0. OCLC 913923800.
- House of Trump, House of Putin: The Untold Story of Donald Trump and the Russian Mafia (2018). New York, New York: Dutton. ISBN 978-1-5247-4350-5. OCLC 1043342267.
- American Kompromat: How the KGB Cultivated Donald Trump, and Related Tales of Sex, Greed, Power, and Treachery (2021). New York, New York: Dutton. ISBN 978-0-593-18253-6. OCLC 1198990661.
- Den of Spies: Reagan, Carter, and the Secret History of the Treason That Stole the White House (2024). Boston: Mariner Books. ISBN 978-0-0633-3060-3. OCLC 1443932071.

== See also ==
- Business projects of Donald Trump in Russia
