= HKN, Inc. =

American oil and gas company

- Company type: Public company
- Industry: Petroleum industry
- Founded: 1973; 53 years ago
- Headquarters: Southlake, Texas, United States
- Key people: Alan G. Quasha, Chairman; Mikel D. Faulkner, CEO; Kristina M. Humphries, CFO
- Products: Petroleum; Natural gas
- Revenue: ▼$385 thousand (2016)
- Net income: ▼ -$7 million (2016)
- Total assets: ▼$11 million (2016)
- Total equity: ▼$11 million (2016)
- Number of employees: 18
- Website: www.hkninc.com

HKN, Inc. is a company engaged in hydrocarbon exploration headquartered in Southlake, Texas. It is notable for the Harken Energy scandal, which involved allegations of insider trading by George W. Bush in 1990. The company was known as Harken Energy Corporation until 2007.

== History ==
In 1973, the company was founded as an unprofitable collection of Texas oil wells for investors seeking tax write-offs.

In 1986, the company acquired Spectrum 7 for 200,000 shares from George W. Bush. After the sale of his company, Bush served on the board of directors of the company and received $80,000-$100,000 per year in consulting fees. Bush remained on the board through 1993.

In 1987, Talat Othman joined the board of the company and served as the chair of the Audit Committee.

In 1987, Bush obtained a critical $25 million loan from a BCCI joint venture.

In 1989, the company's subsidiary Aloha Petroleum was sold to company insiders for $12 million, most of which was borrowed from Harken. The sale of the subsidiary for an exorbitant price helped the company show a profit that year and disguise losses, a similar technique used by Enron that led to the Enron scandal.

In September 1989, the company made an offer to acquire Tesoro Petroleum. The offer was withdrawn in February 1990.

In 2007, the company changed its name to HKN, Inc.

== Controversies ==
=== Insider trading allegations ===
Harken attracted attention because of the role played in its affairs during the 1980s by George W. Bush, later the President of the United States. On June 22, 1990, while he was a member of the company's board of directors, Bush sold stock in Harken shortly before the company announced substantial losses. This transaction resulted in a U.S. Securities and Exchange Commission investigation of probable insider trading.

A transaction associated with the financial endowment of Harvard University was also investigated.

=== Exploration offshore Costa Rica ===
In 2000, a subsidiary of the company received a 20-year concession to exploit resources offshore Costa Rica. After pressure from indigenous tribes and environmentalists, operating as Acción de Lucha Anti-Petrola, the government instituted a moratorium on exploration. In September 2003, the company filed a dispute seeking $57 billion from the government of Costa Rica for lost earnings. The lawsuit was thrown out of court and the concession was revoked.

=== Drone strikes in Iraq ===
In July 2025, the Sarang oil field in Iraq's Kurdish region, operated by HKN Energy, was targeted by drone strikes. The attacks came days after HKN signed a new investment deal with the Iraqi Government. On 1 April 2026, the Sarsang oilfield was again targeted by drone strikes amid regional tensions during the Iran conflict, causing damage to energy infrastructure and disrupting operations at the site.
